= 1938 United States Senate elections =

- November 8, 1938
- Class 3

35 of the 96 seats in the United States Senate 49 seats needed for a majority
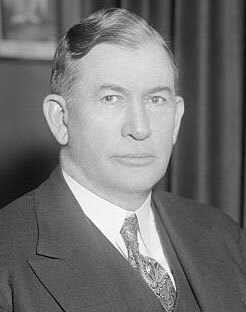

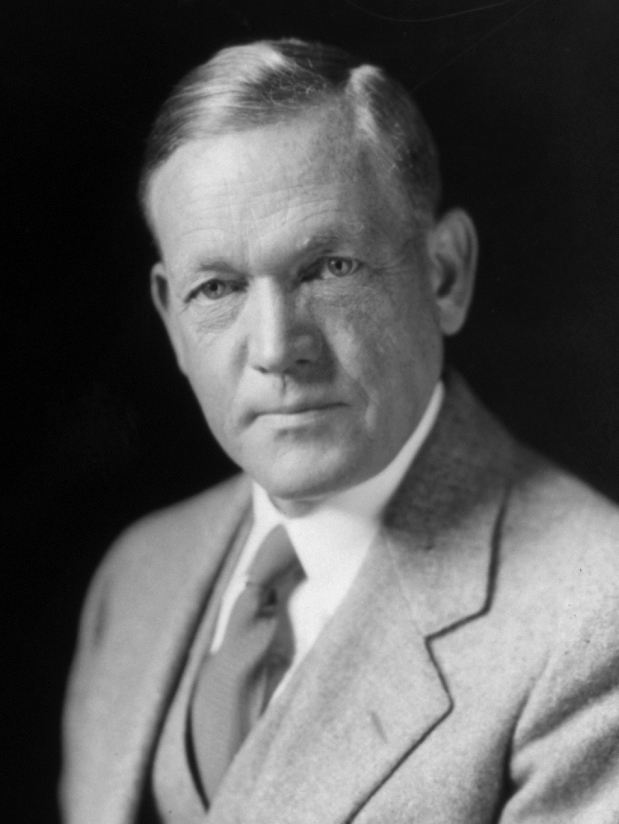
	Majority party	Minority party
Leader	Alben Barkley	Charles McNary
Party	Democratic	Republican
Leader since	July 22, 1937	March 4, 1933
Leader's seat	Kentucky	Oregon
Seats before	77	15
Seats after	69	23
Seat change	▼8	▲8
Seats up	32	3
Races won	24	11
	Third party	Fourth party
Party	Farmer–Labor	National Progressives of America
Seats before	2	1
Seats after	2	1
Seat change	Steady	Steady
Seats up	0	0
Races won	0	0
	Fifth party
Party	Independent
Seats before	1
Seats after	1
Seat change	Steady
Seats up	0
Races won	0
- Results of the elections: Democratic hold Republican gain Republican hold No election
Majority Leader before election
Alben Barkley
Democratic
Elected Majority Leader
Alben Barkley
Democratic

The 1938 United States Senate elections occurred in the middle of Franklin D. Roosevelt's second term. The 32 seats of Class 3 were contested in regular elections, and special elections were held to fill vacancies. The Republicans gained eight seats from the Democrats, though this occurred after multiple Democratic gains since the 1932 elections. As a result, despite the Republican gains, the Democrats retained a commanding lead over them with more than two-thirds of the legislative chamber. However, there were around twenty unreliable Democratic votes for President Franklin D. Roosevelt, which allowed the conservatives to block some of his policies.

== Events of the election ==
A contemporary account cited a number of reasons for the losses suffered by the Democrats. The Recession of 1937–1938 had continued into the first half of 1938 and had arguably weakened public confidence in the administration's New Deal economic policies, along with controversy over the Judicial Procedures Reform Bill of 1937, Roosevelt's "court-packing" plan. More broadly, Roosevelt had faced opposition from the conservative Democrats and the Republicans in Congress since the beginning of his presidency, with Vice President John Nance Garner making a push for Roosevelt to support more conservative policies.

There were, in addition, strains between the more liberal New Deal supporters and the conservative wing of the Democratic party centered in the Southern United States, which were exacerbated by an effort led by Roosevelt to target certain conservative senators for defeat in Democratic primaries, including Walter George of Georgia, Millard Tydings of Maryland, Robert Rice Reynolds of North Carolina, and Ellison Smith of South Carolina. While a number of New Deal supporters won primary elections, such as Alben Barkley in Kentucky, who defeated Governor Happy Chandler, James P. Pope of Idaho, a prominent New Deal supporter, lost his bid for re-nomination, as did California's William McAdoo — though McAdoo's Democratic opponent, Sheridan Downey, had campaigned as a liberal New Dealer on many issues who would also do more to improve pension plans.

The National Progressives of America emerged out of the Wisconsin Progressive Party as a national party on April 18, 1938.

== Gains, losses, and holds ==
=== Retirements ===
One Democrat retired instead of seeking re-election, one Democrat retired instead of seeking election to finish the unexpired term and one Democrat retired instead of seeking election to finish the unexpired term and election to a full term.

State	Senator	Replaced by
Illinois	William H. Dieterich	Scott W. Lucas
Oregon (special)	Alfred E. Reames	Alexander G. Barry
Oregon	Alfred E. Reames	Rufus C. Holman
South Dakota (special)	Herbert E. Hitchcock	Gladys Pyle

=== Defeats ===
Seven Democrats sought re-election but lost in the primary or general election. One Democrat sought election to a full term but lost in the primary election and one Democrat sought election to finish the unexpired term but lost in the primary election.

State	Senator	Replaced by
California	William Gibbs McAdoo	Sheridan Downey
Connecticut	Augustine Lonergan	John A. Danaher
Idaho	James P. Pope	D. Worth Clark
Kansas	George McGill	Clyde M. Reed
New Hampshire	Fred H. Brown	Charles W. Tobey
Ohio	Robert J. Bulkley	Robert A. Taft
South Dakota	Herbert E. Hitchcock	Chan Gurney
Tennessee	George L. Berry	Tom Stewart
Wisconsin	F. Ryan Duffy	Alexander Wiley

=== Death ===
One Democrat died on June 17, 1938, and his seat remained vacant until the election.

State	Senator	Replaced by
New York (special)	Royal S. Copeland	James M. Mead

=== Post-election changes ===
State	Senator	Replaced by
Idaho	William Edgar Borah	John Thomas
Illinois	James Hamilton Lewis	James M. Slattery
Kentucky	Marvel Mills Logan	Happy Chandler
Vermont	Ernest Willard Gibson	Ernest W. Gibson Jr.

== Change in composition ==
=== Before the elections ===
		D_{1}	D_{2}	D_{3}	D_{4}	D_{5}	D_{6}	D_{7}	D_{8}
D_{18}	D_{17}	D_{16}	D_{15}	D_{14}	D_{13}	D_{12}	D_{11}	D_{10}	D_{9}
D_{19}	D_{20}	D_{21}	D_{22}	D_{23}	D_{24}	D_{25}	D_{26}	D_{27}	D_{28}
D_{38}	D_{37}	D_{36}	D_{35}	D_{34}	D_{33}	D_{32}	D_{31}	D_{30}	D_{29}
D_{39}	D_{40}	D_{41}	D_{42}	D_{43}	D_{44}	D_{45}	D_{46} Ala. (reg); Ala. (sp); Ran (Note: On the day of the special election, the interim appointee, Dixie Bibb Graves had resigned and been replaced by a new interim appointee — J. Lister Hill — who then won the special election ("Hold") and was re-elected in November ("Re-elected").)	D_{47} Ariz. Ran	D_{48} Ark. Ran
Majority →									D_{49} Calif. Ran
D_{58} Kan. Ran	D_{57} Iowa; Ran	D_{56} Ind. Ran	D_{55} Ill. Retired	D_{54} Idaho; Ran	D_{53} Ga. Ran	D_{52} Fla. Ran	D_{51} Conn. Ran	D_{50} Colo. Ran	D_{49} Calif. Ran
D_{59} Ky. Ran	D_{60} La. Ran	D_{61} Md. Ran	D_{62} Mo. Ran	D_{63} Nev. Ran	D_{64} N.H. Ran	D_{65} N.J. (sp); Retired	D_{66} N.Y. (reg); Ran	D_{67} N.Y. (sp); Died	D_{68} N.C. Ran
FL_{2}	D_{77} Wisc. Ran	D_{76} Wash. Ran	D_{75} Utah; Ran	D_{74} Tenn. (sp); Ran	D_{73} S.D. (reg); Ran S.D. (sp); Retired	D_{72} S.C. Ran	D_{71} Ore. (reg); Ore. (sp); Retired	D_{70} Okla. Ran	D_{69} Ohio; Ran
FL_{1}	I_{1}	P_{1}	R_{15} Vt. Ran	R_{14} Pa. Ran	R_{13} N.D. Ran	R_{12}	R_{11}	R_{10}	R_{9}
		R_{1}	R_{2}	R_{3}	R_{4}	R_{5}	R_{6}	R_{7}	R_{8}

=== Result of the elections ===
		D_{1}	D_{2}	D_{3}	D_{4}	D_{5}	D_{6}	D_{7}	D_{8}
D_{18}	D_{17}	D_{16}	D_{15}	D_{14}	D_{13}	D_{12}	D_{11}	D_{10}	D_{9}
D_{19}	D_{20}	D_{21}	D_{22}	D_{23}	D_{24}	D_{25}	D_{26}	D_{27}	D_{28}
D_{38}	D_{37}	D_{36}	D_{35}	D_{34}	D_{33}	D_{32}	D_{31}	D_{30}	D_{29}
D_{39}	D_{40}	D_{41}	D_{42}	D_{43}	D_{44}	D_{45}	D_{46} Ala. (sp); Elected (Note: Appointee elected); Ala. (reg); Re-elected	D_{47} Ariz. Re-elected	D_{48} Ark. Re-elected
Majority →									D_{49} Calif. Hold
D_{58} La. Re-elected	D_{57} Ky. Re-elected	D_{56} Iowa; Re-elected	D_{55} Ind. Re-elected	D_{54} Ill. Hold	D_{53} Idaho; Hold	D_{52} Ga. Re-elected	D_{51} Fla. Re-elected	D_{50} Colo. Re-elected	D_{49} Calif. Hold
D_{59} Md. Re-elected	D_{60} Mo. Re-elected	D_{61} Nev. Re-elected	D_{62} N.Y. (reg); Re-elected	D_{63} N.Y. (sp); Hold	D_{64} N.C. Re-elected	D_{65} Okla. Re-elected	D_{66} S.C. Re-elected	D_{67} Tenn. (sp); Hold	D_{68} Utah; Re-elected
R_{19} N.J. (sp); Gain	R_{20} Ohio; Gain	R_{21} Ore. (reg); Ore. (sp); Gain	R_{22} S.D. (reg); S.D. (sp); Gain	R_{23} Wisc. Gain	P_{1}	I_{1}	FL_{1}	FL_{2}	D_{69} Wash. Re-elected
R_{18} N.H. Gain	R_{17} Kan. Gain	R_{16} Conn. Gain	R_{15} Vt. Re-elected	R_{14} Pa. Re-elected	R_{13} N.D. Re-elected	R_{12}	R_{11}	R_{10}	R_{9}
		R_{1}	R_{2}	R_{3}	R_{4}	R_{5}	R_{6}	R_{7}	R_{8}

Key:

D_{#}	Democratic
FL_{#}	Farmer–Labor
I_{#}	Independent
P_{#}	Progressive
R_{#}	Republican

== Race summaries ==
=== Special elections during the 75th Congress ===
In these special elections, the winner was seated during 1938 or before January 3, 1939; ordered by election date.

State	Incumbent			Results	Candidates
State	Senator	Party	Electoral history	Results	Candidates
Alabama (Class 3)	J. Lister Hill	Democratic	1938 (Appointed)	Interim appointee elected April 26, 1938.	▌ ✓ J. Lister Hill (Democratic); Unopposed
New Jersey (Class 1)	John Milton	Democratic	1938 (Appointed)	Interim appointee retired. Winner elected November 8, 1938. Republican gain.	▌ ✓ W. Warren Barbour (Republican) 53.0%; ▌William H. J. Ely (Democratic) 45.7%
New York (Class 1)	Royal S. Copeland	Democratic	1922; 1928; 1934	Incumbent died June 17, 1938. Winner elected November 8, 1938. Democratic hold.	▌ ✓ James M. Mead (Democratic) 53.6%; ▌Edward F. Corsi (Republican) 45.8%
Oregon (Class 3)	Alfred E. Reames	Democratic	1938 (Appointed)	Interim appointee retired. Winner elected November 8, 1938. Republican gain. Winner did not run for the next term, however; see below.	▌ ✓ Alexander G. Barry (Republican) 54.2%; ▌Robert A. Miller (Democratic) 45.8%
South Dakota (Class 3)	Herbert E. Hitchcock	Democratic	1936 (Appointed)	Interim appointee retired. Winner elected November 8, 1938. Republican gain. Winner did not run for the next term, however; see below.	▌ ✓ Gladys Pyle (Republican) 58.1%; ▌John T. McCullen (Democratic) 41.9%
Tennessee (Class 2)	George L. Berry	Democratic	1937 (Appointed)	Interim appointee lost nomination to finish the term. Winner elected November 8, 1938. Democratic hold. Winner delayed his term until January 16, 1939, to finish his term as district attorney.	▌ ✓ Tom Stewart (Democratic) 70.5%; ▌Harley G. Fowler (Republican) 26.2%

=== Races leading to the 76th Congress ===
In these general elections, the winners were elected for the term beginning January 3, 1939; ordered by state.

All of the elections involved the Class 3 seats.

State	Incumbent			Results	Candidates
State	Senator	Party	Electoral history	Results	Candidates
Alabama	J. Lister Hill	Democratic	1938 (Appointed); 1938 (special)	Incumbent re-elected.	▌ ✓ J. Lister Hill (Democratic) 86.4%; ▌J. M. Pennington (Republican) 13.6%
Arizona	Carl Hayden	Democratic	1926; 1932	Incumbent re-elected.	▌ ✓ Carl Hayden (Democratic) 76.5%; ▌B. H. Clingan (Republican) 23.5%
Arkansas	Hattie Caraway	Democratic	1931 (Appointed); 1932 (special)	Incumbent re-elected.	▌ ✓ Hattie Caraway (Democratic) 89.6%; ▌C. D. Atkinson (Republican) 10.4%
California	William Gibbs McAdoo	Democratic	1932	Incumbent lost renomination. New senator elected. Democratic hold. Incumbent then resigned and Thomas M. Storke (D) was appointed to finish the term.	▌ ✓ Sheridan Downey (Democratic) 54.4%; ▌Philip Bancroft (Republican) 44.7%; ▌Lillain Symes Clements (Socialist) 0.9%
Colorado	Alva B. Adams	Democratic	1923 (Appointed); 1924 (Retired); 1932	Incumbent re-elected.	▌ ✓ Alva B. Adams (Democratic) 58.2%; ▌Archibald A. Lee (Republican) 40.2%
Connecticut	Augustine Lonergan	Democratic	1932	Incumbent lost re-election. New senator elected. Republican gain.	▌ ✓ John A. Danaher (Republican) 42.9%; ▌Augustine Lonergan (Democratic) 40.0%; ▌Bellani Trombley (Socialist) 15.8%
Florida	Claude Pepper	Democratic	1936 (special)	Incumbent re-elected.	▌ ✓ Claude Pepper (Democratic) 82.5%; ▌Thomas E. Swanson (Republican) 17.6%
Georgia	Walter F. George	Democratic	1922 (special); 1926; 1932	Incumbent re-elected.	▌ ✓ Walter F. George (Democratic) 95.1%; ▌Charles A. Jiles (Independent) 4.9%
Idaho	James P. Pope	Democratic	1932	Incumbent lost renomination. New senator elected. Democratic hold.	▌ ✓ D. Worth Clark (Democratic) 54.7%; ▌Donald A. Callahan (Republican) 44.9%
Illinois	William H. Dieterich	Democratic	1932	Incumbent retired. New senator elected. Democratic hold.	▌ ✓ Scott W. Lucas (Democratic) 51.3%; ▌Richard J. Lyons (Republican) 48.3%
Indiana	Frederick Van Nuys	Democratic	1932	Incumbent re-elected.	▌ ✓ Frederick Van Nuys (Democratic) 49.8%; ▌Raymond E. Willis (Republican) 49.5%; Others: ▌Herman L. Seeger (Prohibition) 0.4%; ▌Louis E. Roebuck (Socialist) 0.1%; ▌Miles Blansett (Communist) 0.1%
Iowa	Guy Gillette	Democratic	1936 (special)	Incumbent re-elected.	▌ ✓ Guy Gillette (Democratic) 49.7%; ▌L. J. Dickinson (Republican) 49.4%
Kansas	George McGill	Democratic	1930 (special); 1932	Incumbent lost re-election. New senator elected. Republican gain.	▌ ✓ Clyde M. Reed (Republican) 56.2%; ▌George McGill (Democratic) 43.8%
Kentucky	Alben W. Barkley	Democratic	1926; 1932	Incumbent re-elected.	▌ ✓ Alben W. Barkley (Democratic) 62.0%; ▌John P. Haswell (Republican) 38.0%
Louisiana	John H. Overton	Democratic	1932	Incumbent re-elected.	▌ ✓ John H. Overton (Democratic); Unopposed
Maryland	Millard Tydings	Democratic	1926; 1932	Incumbent re-elected.	▌ ✓ Millard Tydings (Democratic) 68.3%; ▌Oscar Lesser (Republican) 29.3%
Missouri	Bennett Champ Clark	Democratic	1932; 1933 (Appointed)	Incumbent re-elected.	▌ ✓ Bennett Champ Clark (Democratic) 60.7%; ▌Henry S. Caulfield (Republican) 39.2%
Nevada	Pat McCarran	Democratic	1932	Incumbent re-elected.	▌ ✓ Pat McCarran (Democratic) 59.0%; ▌Tasker Oddie (Republican) 41.0%
New Hampshire	Fred H. Brown	Democratic	1932	Incumbent lost re-election. New senator elected. Republican gain.	▌ ✓ Charles W. Tobey (Republican) 54.2%; ▌Fred H. Brown (Democratic) 45.8%
New York	Robert F. Wagner	Democratic	1926; 1932	Incumbent re-elected.	▌ ✓ Robert F. Wagner (Democratic) 54.5%; ▌John Lord O'Brian (Republican) 45.0%
North Carolina	Robert R. Reynolds	Democratic	1932 (special); 1932	Incumbent re-elected.	▌ ✓ Robert R. Reynolds (Democratic) 63.8%; ▌Charles A. Jonas (Republican) 36.2%
North Dakota	Gerald Nye	Republican	1925 (Appointed); 1926 (special); 1932	Incumbent re-elected.	▌ ✓ Gerald Nye (Republican) 50.1%; ▌William Langer (Independent) 42.6%; ▌J. J. Nygard (Democratic) 7.3%
Ohio	Robert J. Bulkley	Democratic	1930 (special); 1932	Incumbent lost re-election. New senator elected. Republican gain.	▌ ✓ Robert A. Taft (Republican) 53.6%; ▌Robert J. Bulkley (Democratic) 46.4%
Oklahoma	Elmer Thomas	Democratic	1926; 1932	Incumbent re-elected.	▌ ✓ Elmer Thomas (Democratic) 65.4%; ▌Harry G. Glasser (Republican) 33.9%
Oregon	Alfred E. Reames	Democratic	1938 (Appointed)	Interim appointee retired. New senator elected. Republican gain.	▌ ✓ Rufus C. Holman (Republican) 54.9%; ▌Willis Mahoney (Democratic) 45.1%
Pennsylvania	James J. Davis	Republican	1930 (special); 1932	Incumbent re-elected.	▌ ✓ James J. Davis (Republican) 54.7%; ▌George Howard Earle III (Democratic) 44.4%
South Carolina	Ellison D. Smith	Democratic	1909; 1914; 1920; 1926; 1932	Incumbent re-elected.	▌ ✓ Ellison D. Smith (Democratic); Unopposed
South Dakota	Herbert E. Hitchcock	Democratic	1936 (Appointed)	Interim appointee lost nomination to next term. New senator elected. Republican gain.	▌ ✓ Chan Gurney (Republican) 52.5%; ▌Tom Berry (Democratic) 47.5%
Utah	Elbert D. Thomas	Democratic	1932	Incumbent re-elected.	▌ ✓ Elbert D. Thomas (Democratic) 55.8%; ▌Franklin S. Harris (Republican) 44.2%
Vermont	Ernest W. Gibson	Republican	1933 (Appointed); 1934 (special)	Incumbent re-elected.	▌ ✓ Ernest W. Gibson (Republican) 65.7%; ▌John McGrath (Democratic) 34.3%
Washington	Homer Bone	Democratic	1932	Incumbent re-elected.	▌ ✓ Homer Bone (Democratic) 62.6%; ▌Ewing D. Colvin (Republican) 37.1%; ▌Eugene Solie (Socialist Labor) 0.3%
Wisconsin	F. Ryan Duffy	Democratic	1932	Incumbent lost re-election. New senator elected. Republican gain.	▌ ✓ Alexander Wiley (Republican) 47.7%; ▌Herman Ekern (Progressive) 26.6%; ▌F. Ryan Duffy (Democratic) 24.7%

== Closest races ==
Thirteen races had a margin of victory under 10%:

State	Party of winner	Margin
Indiana	Democratic	0.3%
Iowa	Democratic	0.3%
Connecticut	Republican (flip)	2.9%
Illinois	Democratic	3.0%
South Dakota	Republican (flip)	5.0%
Ohio	Republican (flip)	7.2%
New Jersey	Republican (flip)	7.3%
North Dakota	Democratic	7.5%
New Hampshire	Republican (flip)	8.4%
New York	Democratic	9.5%
California	Democratic	9.7%
Idaho	Democratic	9.8%
Oregon	Republican (flip)	9.8%

There is no tipping point state.

== Alabama ==
There were 2 elections due to the August 19, 1937, resignation of two-term Democrat Hugo Black. Democrat Dixie Bibb Graves was appointed August 20, 1937 (by her husband, the governor) to finish Black's term.

=== Alabama (special) ===
1938 United States Senate Democratic primary special election in Alabama
- January 4, 1938
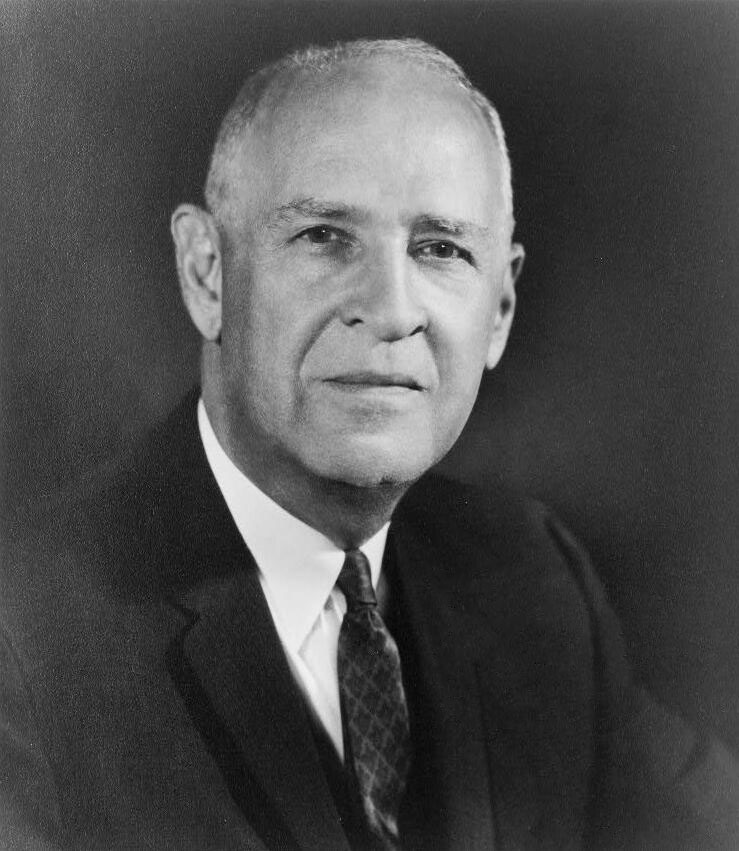

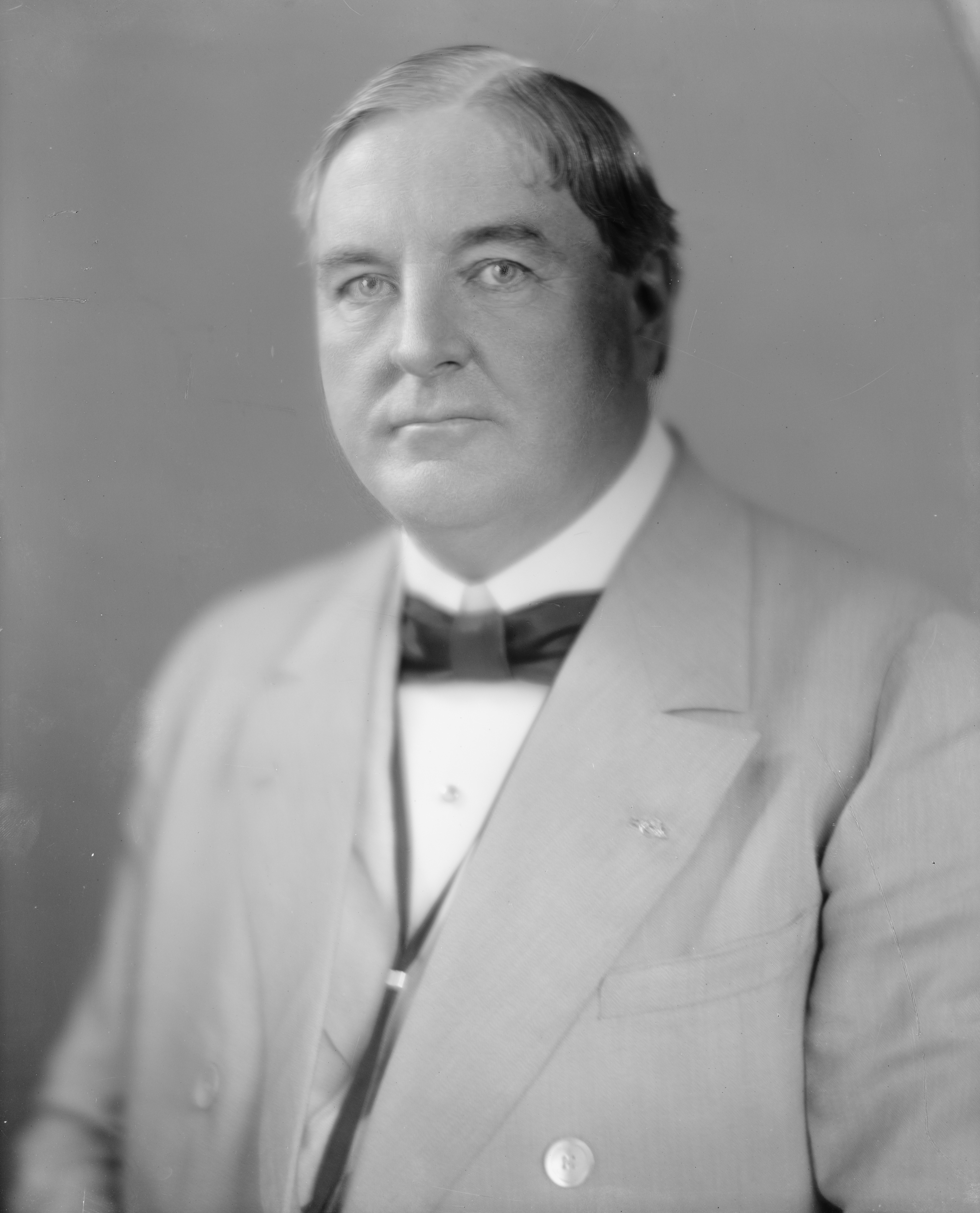
Nominee	Lister Hill	James Thomas Heflin
Party	Democratic	Democratic
Popular vote	90,601	50,189
Percentage	61.81%	34.24%
- County results Hill: 40–50% 50–60% 60–70% 70–80% 80–90% >90% Heflin: 50–60% 60–70%
U.S. senator before election
Dixie Bibb Graves
Democratic
Elected U.S. Senator
J. Lister Hill
Democratic

Alabama special Democratic primary, January 4, 1938
Party	Candidate	Votes	%
Democratic	J. Lister Hill	90,601	61.81%
Democratic	James Thomas Heflin	50,189	34.24%
Democratic	Charles W. Williams	5,783	3.95%
Turnout			1.87%
Democratic hold			
Majority		40,412	27.57%

After congressman J. Lister Hill won the January 4, 1938, Democratic primary, Graves resigned and Hill was appointed to continue the term until the April 26, 1938, special election, which he won unopposed.

Alabama special election, April 26, 1938
Party	Candidate	Votes	%
Democratic	J. Lister Hill (Incumbent)	49,429	100.00%
Turnout			1.87%
Democratic hold			

Hill was then easily re-elected in November to the next term.

=== Alabama (regular) ===
1938 United States Senate Election in Alabama
- November 8, 1938
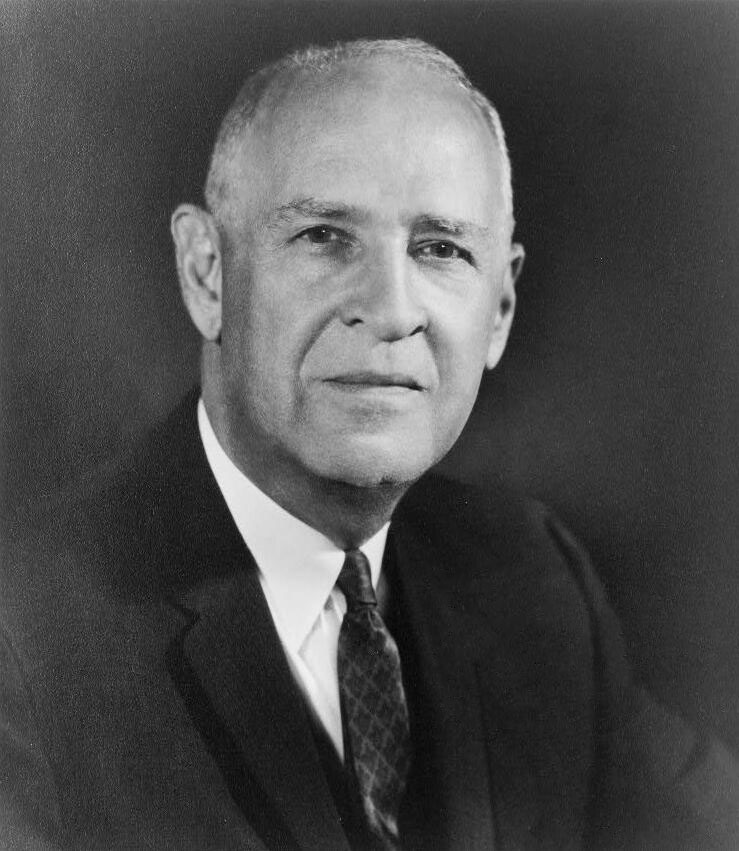
Nominee	Lister Hill	J. M. Pennington
Party	Democratic	Republican
Popular vote	113,413	17,885
Percentage	86.38%	13.62%
- County results Hill: 50–60% 60–70% 70–80% 80–90% 90–100% Heflin: 50–60%
U.S. senator before election
J. Lister Hill
Democratic
Elected U.S. Senator
J. Lister Hill
Democratic

Alabama election
Party	Candidate	Votes	%
Democratic	J. Lister Hill (Incumbent)	113,413	86.38%
Republican	J. M. Pennington	17,885	13.62%
None	Scattering	1	0.00%
Majority		95,528	72.76%
Turnout		131,299	4.96%
Democratic hold			

== Arizona ==
1938 United States Senate election in Arizona
- November 8, 1938
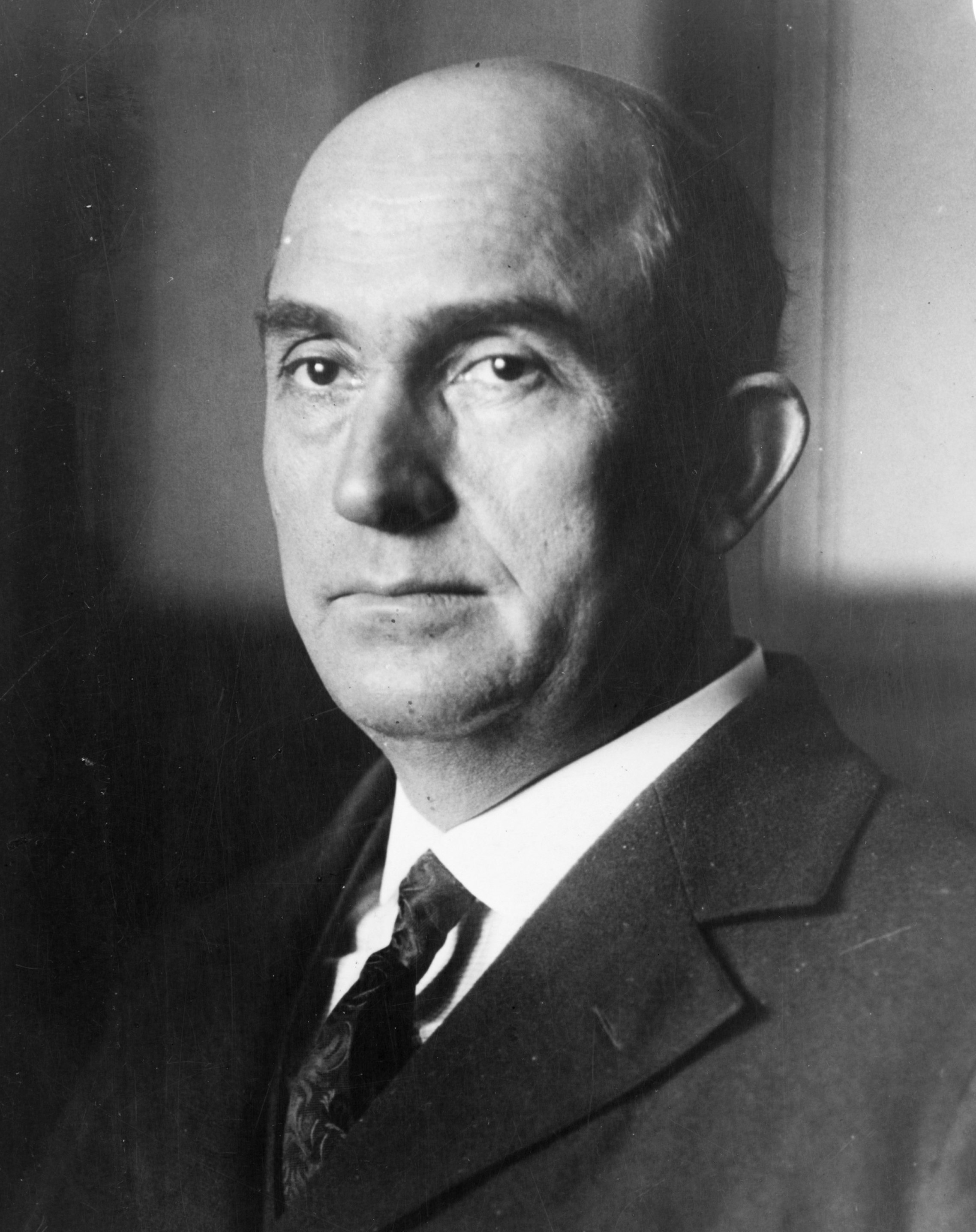

Nominee	Carl Hayden	Burt H. Clingan
Party	Democratic	Republican
Popular vote	82,714	25,378
Percentage	76.52%	23.48%
- County results Hayden: 70–80% 80–90% >90%
U.S. senator before election
Carl Hayden
Democratic
Elected U.S. Senator
Carl Hayden
Democratic

Incumbent Democrat Carl Hayden was re-elected to a third term, defeating Republican nominee Burt H. Clingan, chairman of the Arizona Industrial Commission, in the general election.

In contrast to previous elections, Hayden was easily reelected, receiving only token opposition from a relatively unknown Republican challenger.

Arizona Democratic primary
Party	Candidate	Votes	%
Democratic	Carl T. Hayden (Incumbent)	68,328	65.48%
Democratic	Robert E. Miller	22,154	21.23%
Democratic	Whit I. Hughes	13,867	13.29%
Total votes		104,349	100.00

Arizona general election
Party	Candidate	Votes	%
Democratic	Carl T. Hayden (Incumbent)	82,714	76.52%
Republican	Burt H. Clingan	25,378	23.48%
Majority		57,336	53.04%
Turnout		108,092	
Democratic hold			

== Arkansas ==
1938 United States Senate election in Arkansas
- November 8, 1938
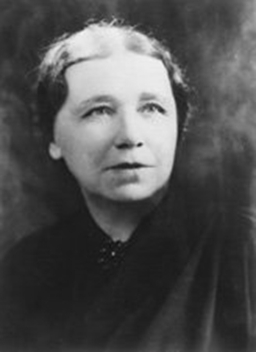

Nominee	Hattie Caraway	C. D. Atkinson
Party	Democratic	Republican
Popular vote	122,883	14,290
Percentage	89.58%	10.42%
- County results Caraway: 50–60% 60–70% 70–80% 80–90% >90%
U.S. senator before election
Hattie Caraway
Democratic
Elected U.S. Senator
Hattie Caraway
Democratic

Arkansas election
Party	Candidate	Votes	%
Democratic	Hattie Wyatt Caraway (Incumbent)	122,883	89.58%
Republican	C. T. Atkinson	14,290	10.42%
Majority		108,593	79.16%
Turnout		137,173	
Democratic hold			

== California ==
1938 United States Senate election in California
- November 8, 1938
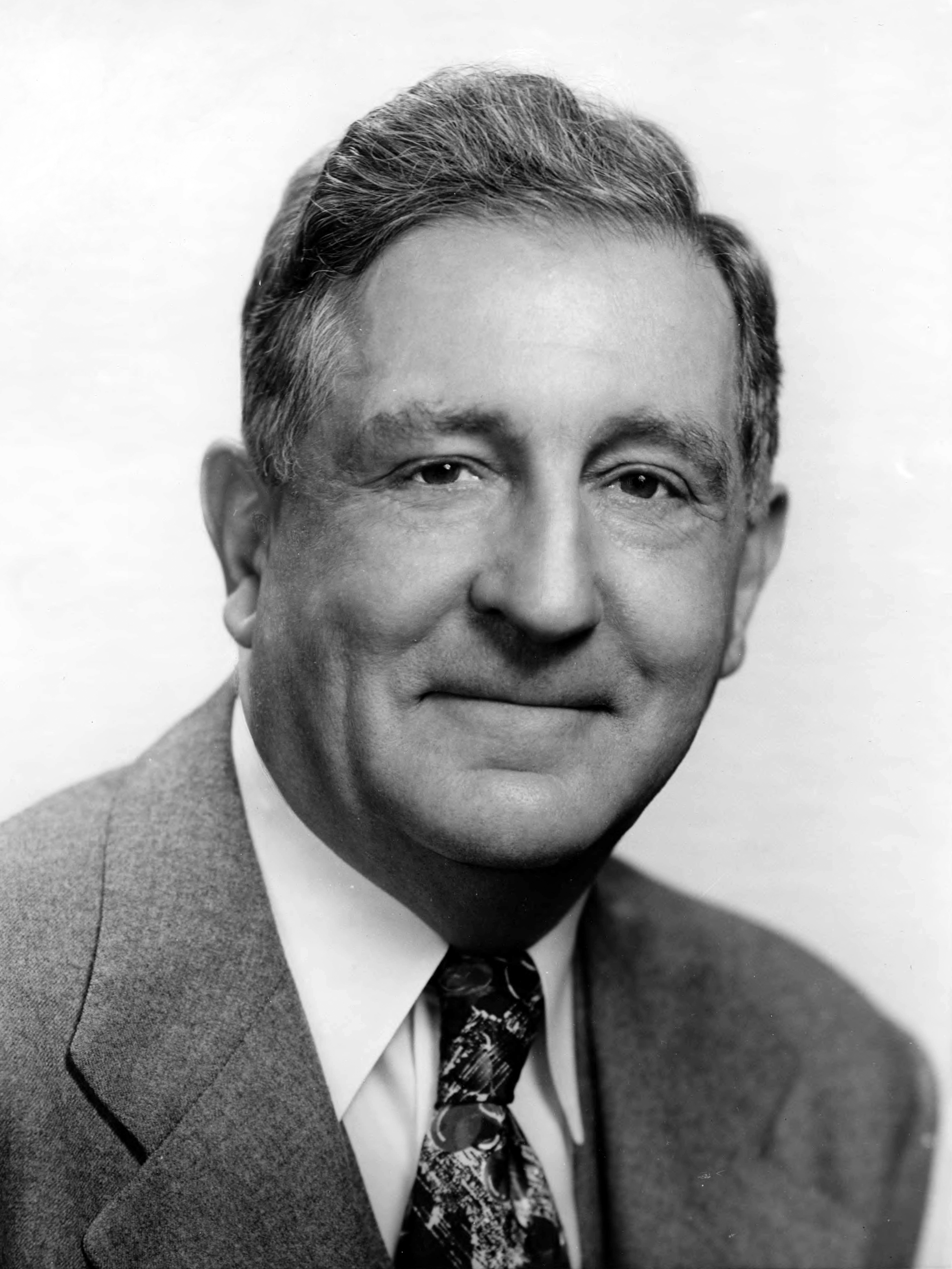

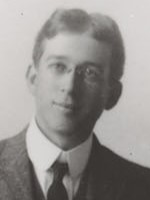
Nominee	Sheridan Downey	Philip Bancroft
Party	Democratic	Republican
Alliance	Progressive; Townsend
Popular vote	1,372,314	1,126,240
Percentage	54.43%	44.67%
- County results Downey: 40–50% 50–60% 60–70% Bancroft: 40–50% 50–60% 70–80%
U.S. senator before election
William Gibbs McAdoo
Democratic
Elected U.S. Senator
Sheridan Downey
Democratic

California election
Party	Candidate	Votes	%
Democratic	Sheridan Downey	1,372,314	54.41%
Republican	Philip Bancroft	1,126,240	44.65%
Socialist	Lillian Symes Clements	22,569	0.89%
None	Scattering	1,019	0.04%
Majority		246,074	9.76%
Turnout		2,522,142	
Democratic hold			

== Colorado ==
1938 United States Senate election in Colorado
- November 8, 1938
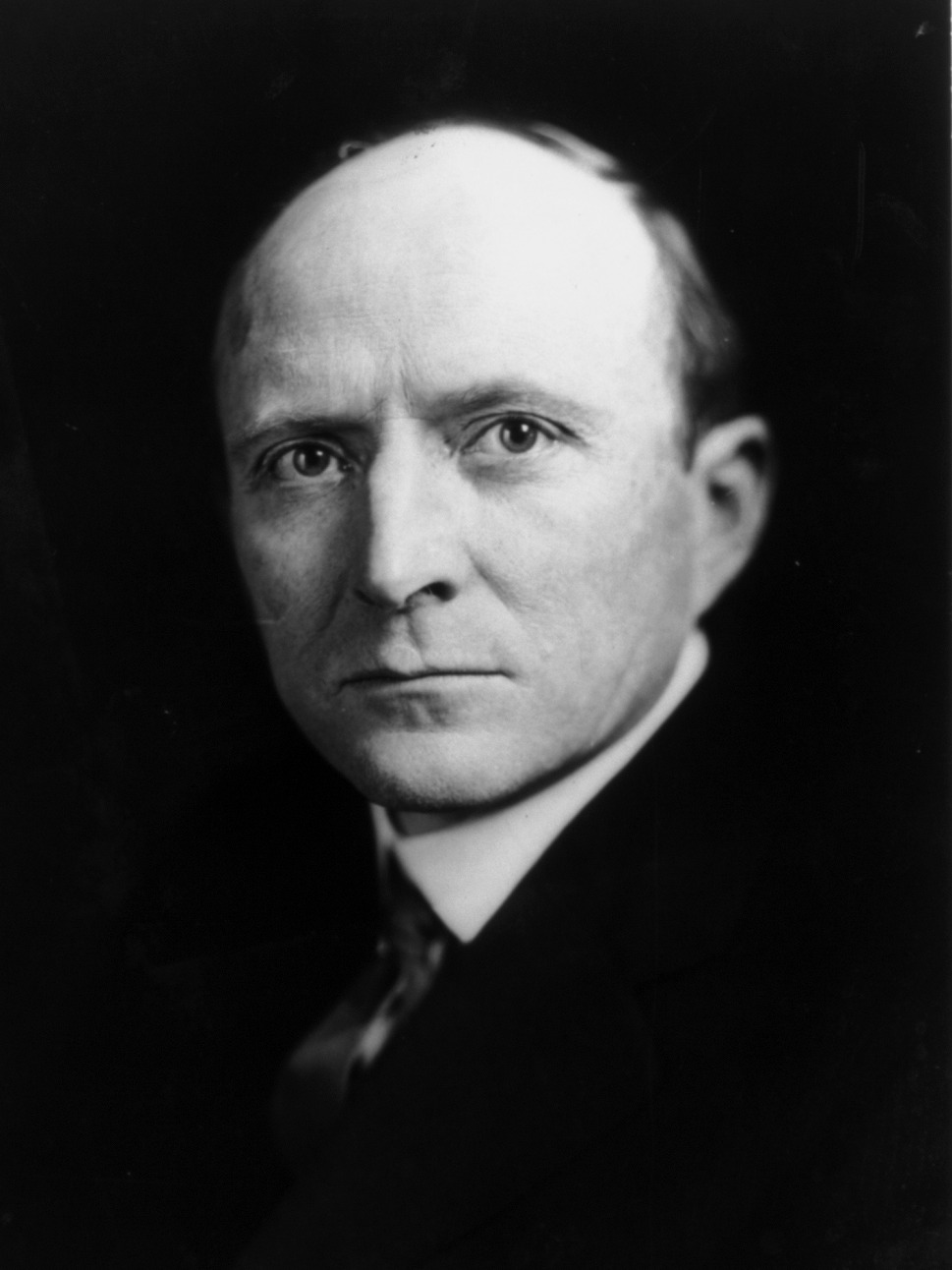
Nominee	Alva B. Adams	Archibald A. Lee
Party	Democratic	Republican
Popular vote	262,806	181,297
Percentage	58.24%	40.18%
- Results by county Adams: 50–60% 60–70% 70–80% Lee: 40–50% 50–60%
U.S. senator before election
Alva B. Adams
Democratic
Elected U.S. Senator
Alva B. Adams
Democratic

Colorado election
Party	Candidate	Votes	%
Democratic	Alva B. Adams (Incumbent)	262,786	58.24%
Republican	Archibald A. Lee	181,297	40.18%
Socialist	Carle Whitehead	3,604	0.80%
Independent Progressive	James Allander	3,522	0.78%
Majority		81,489	18.06%
Turnout		451,209	
Democratic hold			

== Connecticut ==
1938 United States Senate election in Connecticut
- November 8, 1938
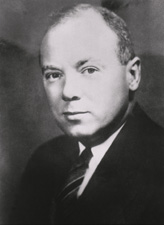

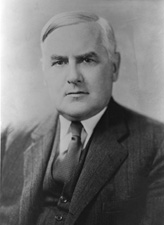

Nominee	John A. Danaher	Augustine Lonergan	Bellani Trombley
Party	Republican	Democratic	Socialist
Alliance		Union
Popular vote	270,413	252,426	99,282
Percentage	42.89%	40.04%	15.75%
- Danaher: 30–40% 40–50% 50–60% 60–70% 70–80% Lonergan: 30–40% 40–50% 50–60% 60–70% Trombley: 40–50% Tie: 30–40%
U.S. senator before election
Augustine Lonergan
Democratic
Elected U.S. Senator
John A. Danaher
Republican

Connecticut election
Party	Candidate	Votes	%
Republican	John A. Danaher	270,413	42.89%
Democratic	Augustine Lonergan (Incumbent)	252,426	40.04%
Socialist	Bellani Trombley	99,282	15.75%
Socialist Labor	Joseph Mackey	6,931	1.10%
American Labor	Philip Brainard	766	0.12%
Communist	Michael A. Russo	615	0.10%
Majority		17,987	2.85%
Turnout		630,433	
Republican gain from Democratic			

== Florida ==
1938 United States Senate election in Florida
- November 8, 1938
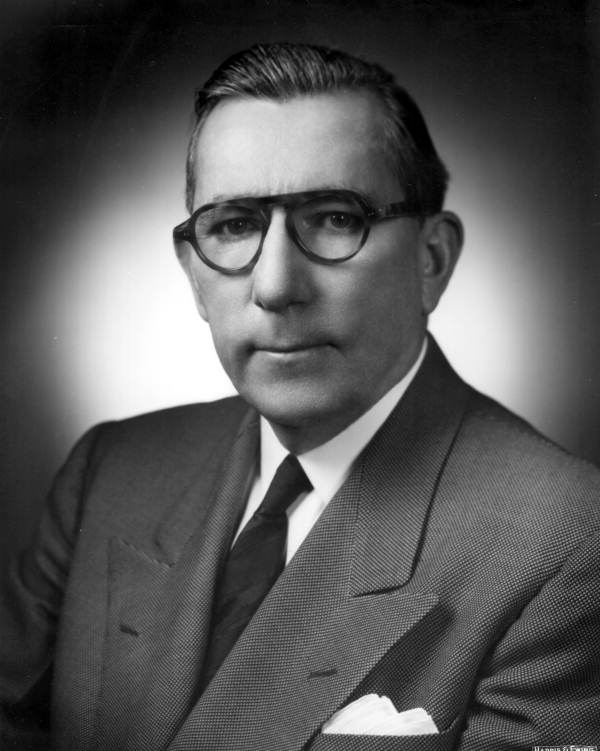

Nominee	Claude Pepper	Thomas E. Swanson
Party	Democratic	Republican
Popular vote	145,757	31,035
Percentage	82.45%	17.55%
- County results Pepper: 60–70% 70–80% 80–90% 90–100%
Senator before election
Claude Pepper
Democratic
Elected Senator
Claude Pepper
Democratic

Florida election
Party	Candidate	Votes	%
Democratic	Claude Pepper (Incumbent)	145,757	82.45%
Republican	Thomas E. Swanson	31,035	17.55%
Majority		114,722	64.90%
Turnout		176,792	
Democratic hold			

== Georgia ==
1938 U.S. Senate Democratic primary in Georgia
- September 14, 1938
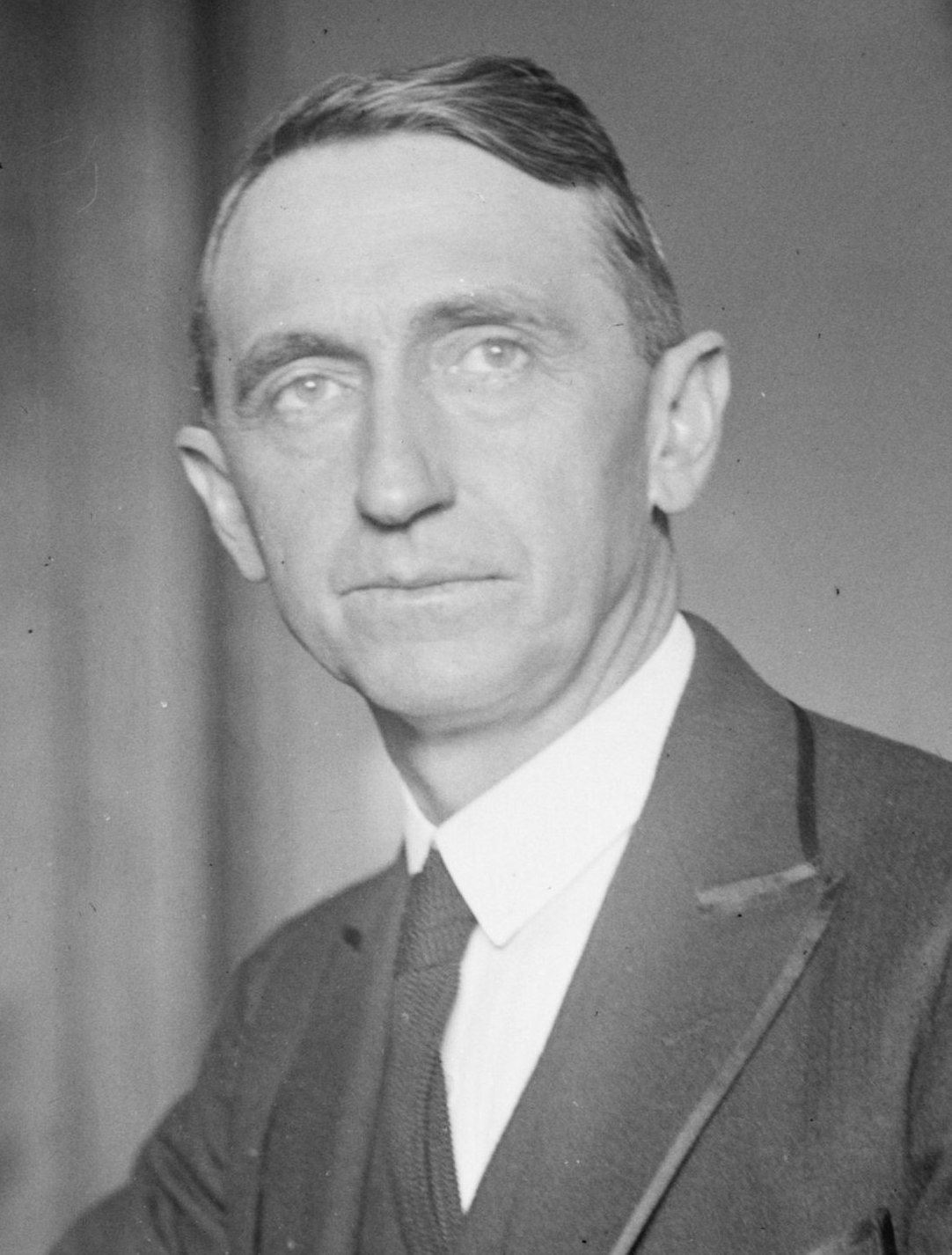

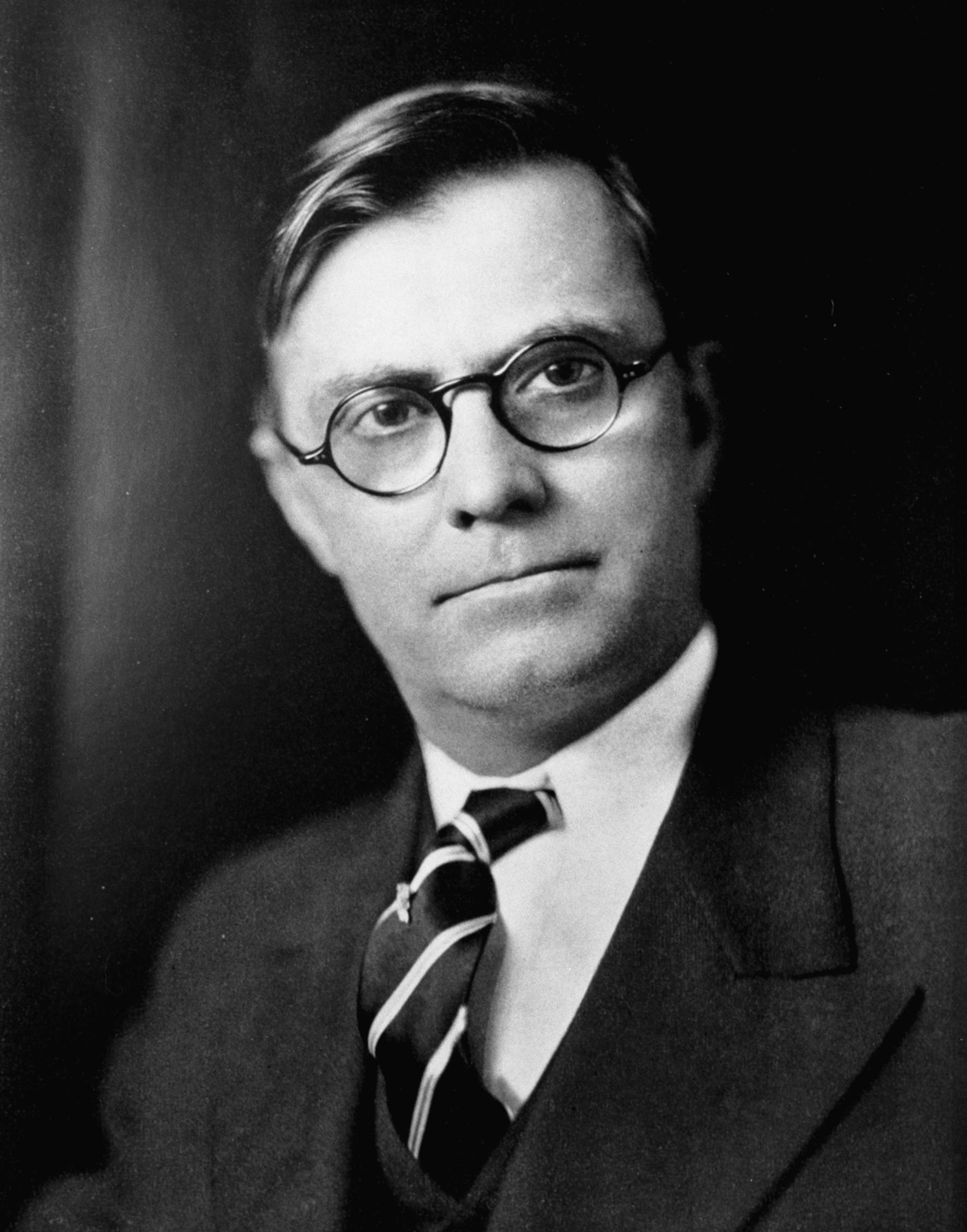

Nominee	Walter F. George	Eugene Talmadge	Lawrence Camp
Party	Democratic	Democratic	Democratic
Electoral vote	242	148	20
Popular vote	141,235	103,075	122,152
Percentage	43.96%	32.08%	19.69%
- County results George: 30–40% 40–50% 50–60% 60–70% 70–80% Talmadge: 30–40% 40–50% 50–60% 60–70% Camp: 30–40% 40–50% 50–60% 60–70%
U.S. senator before election
Walter F. George
Democratic
Elected U.S. Senator
Walter F. George
Democratic

Georgia election
Party	Candidate	Votes	%
Democratic	Walter F. George (Incumbent)	66,987	95.09%
Independent	Charles A. Jiles	3,442	4.89%
Independent	Eugene Talmadge	14	0.02%
Majority		63,545	90.20%
Turnout		70,443	
Democratic hold			

== Idaho ==
1938 United States Senate election in Idaho
- November 8, 1938
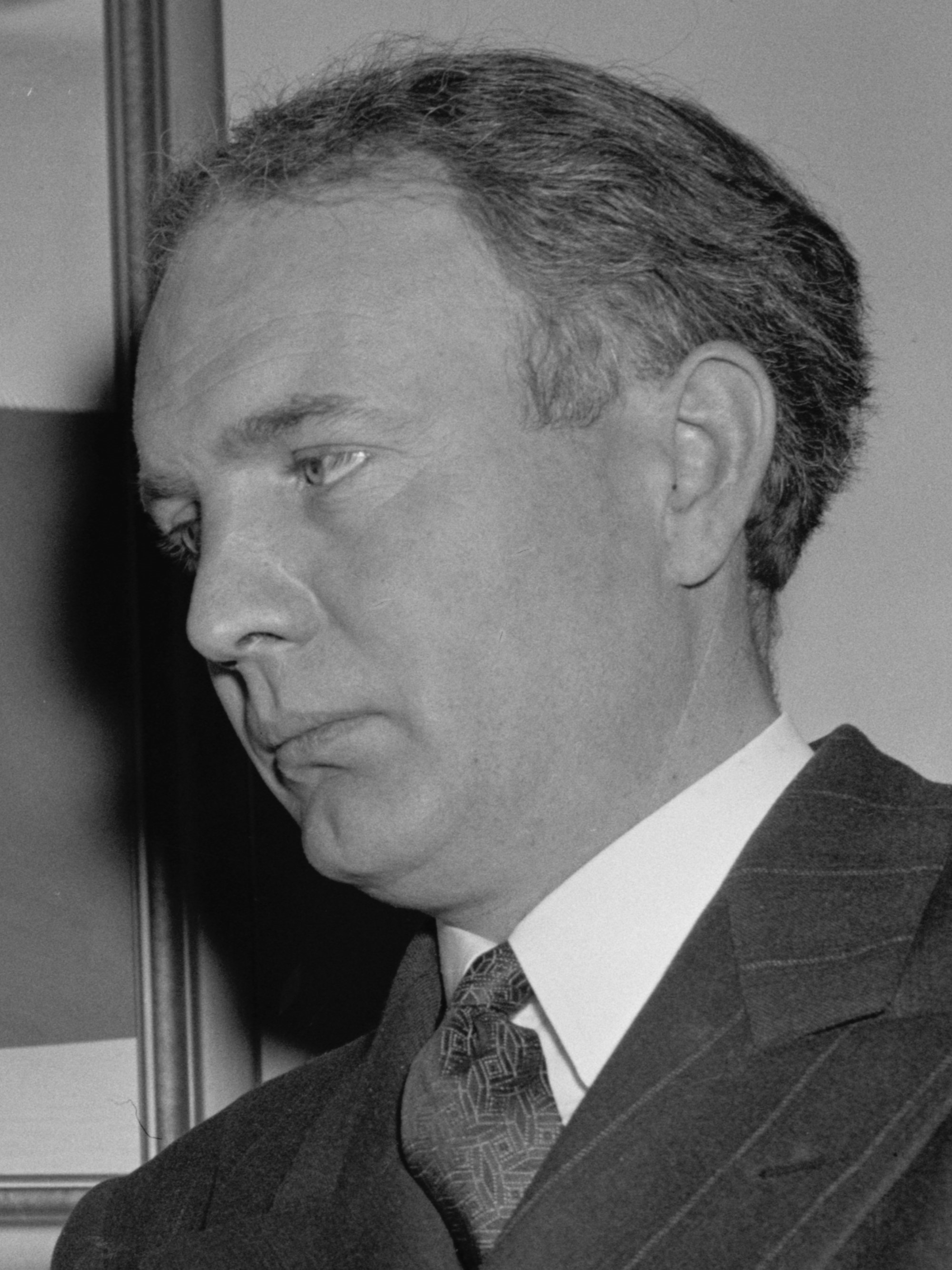
Nominee	D. Worth Clark	Donald A. Callahan
Party	Democratic	Republican
Popular vote	99,801	81,939
Percentage	54.66%	44.88%
- County results Clark: 50–60% 60–70% Callahan: 50–60% 60–70%
U.S. senator before election
James P. Pope
Democratic
Elected U.S. Senator
D. Worth Clark
Democratic

Idaho election
Party	Candidate	Votes	%
Democratic	David Worth Clark	99,801	54.66%
Republican	Donald A. Callahan	81,939	44.88%
National Progressives of America	V. A. Verhei	845	0.46%
Majority		17,862	9.78%
Turnout		182,585	
Democratic hold			

== Illinois ==
1938 United States Senate election in Illinois
- November 8, 1938
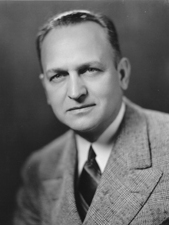

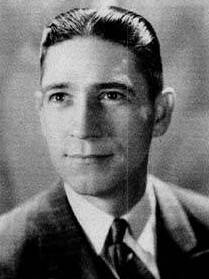
Nominee	Scott W. Lucas	Richard J. Lyons
Party	Democratic	Republican
Popular vote	1,638,162	1,542,574
Percentage	51.32%	48.33%
- County results Lucas: 50–60% 60–70% Lyons: 40–50% 50–60% 60–70% 70–80%
U.S. senator before election
William H. Dieterich
Democratic
Elected U.S. senator
Scott W. Lucas
Democratic

Incumbent Democrat William H. Dieterich retired, making this an open-seat.

Illinois election
Party	Candidate	Votes	%
Democratic	Scott W. Lucas	1,638,162	51.32%
Republican	Richard J. Lyons	1,542,574	48.33%
Prohibition	Enoch A. Holtwick	10,707	0.34%
None	Scattering	569	0.02%
Majority		95,588	2.99%
Turnout		3,192,012	
Democratic hold			

== Indiana ==
1938 United States Senate election in Indiana
- November 8, 1938
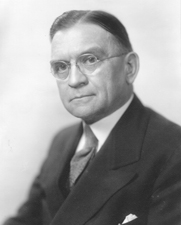

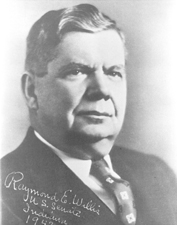
Nominee	Frederick Van Nuys	Raymond E. Willis
Party	Democratic	Republican
Popular vote	788,386	783,189
Percentage	49.85%	49.52%
- County results Van Nuys: 40–50% 50–60% 60–70% Willis: 40–50% 50–60% 60–70%
U.S. senator before election
Frederick Van Nuys
Democratic
Elected U.S. Senator
Frederick Van Nuys
Democratic

Indiana election
Party	Candidate	Votes	%
Democratic	Frederick Van Nuys (Incumbent)	788,386	49.85%
Republican	Raymond E. Willis	783,189	49.52%
Prohibition	Herman L. Seeger	6,905	0.44%
Socialist	Louis E. Roebuck	2,026	0.13%
Communist	Miles Blansett	984	0.06%
Majority		5,197	0.33%
Turnout		1,581,490	
Democratic hold			

== Iowa ==
1938 United States Senate election in Iowa
- November 8, 1938
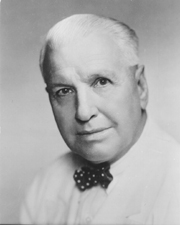

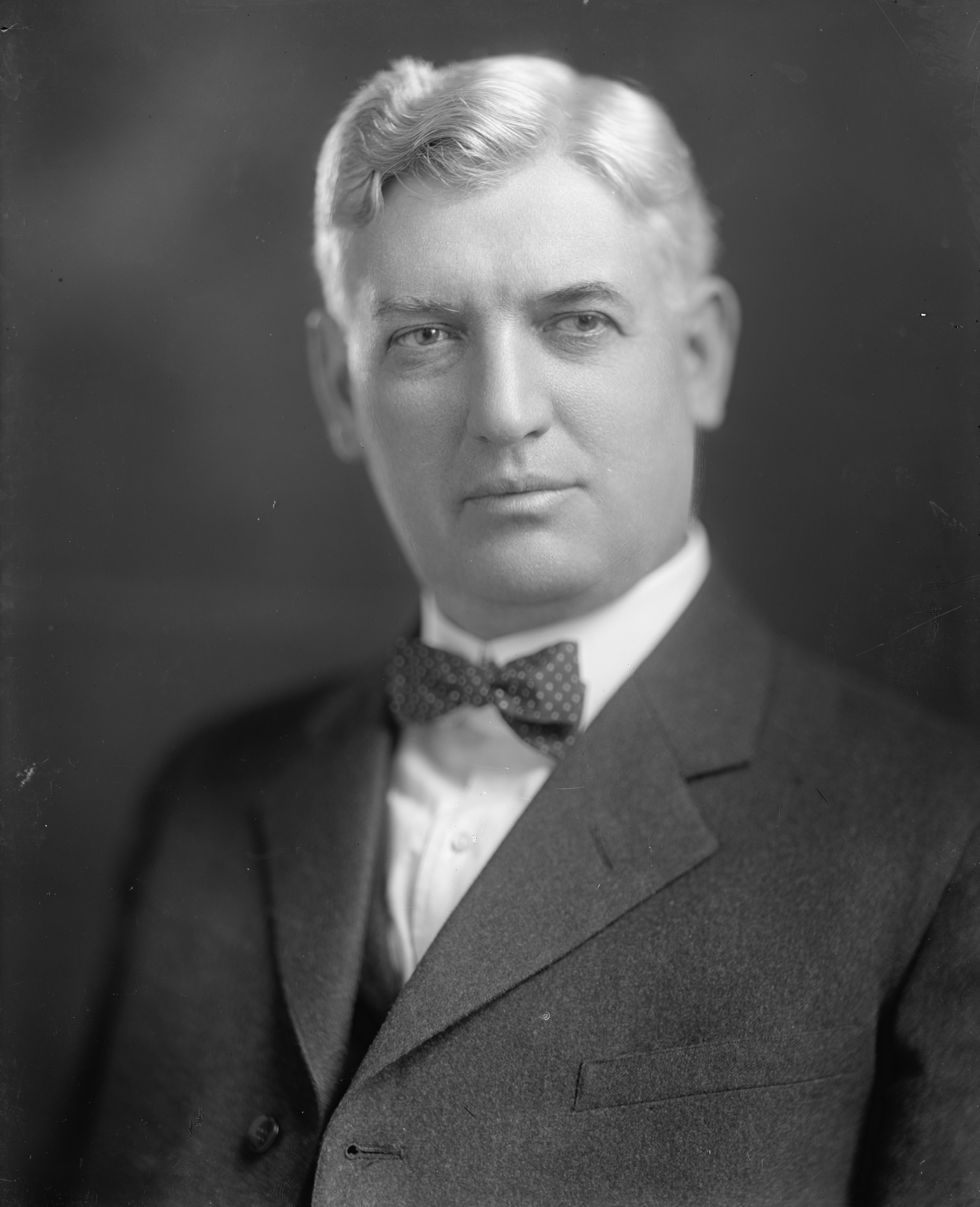
Nominee	Guy M. Gillette	Lester J. Dickinson
Party	Democratic	Republican
Popular vote	413,788	410,983
Percentage	49.74%	49.41%
- Gillette: 40–50% 50–60% 60–70% 70–80% Dickinson: 40–50% 50–60% 60–70%
U.S. senator before election
Guy M. Gillette
Democratic
Elected U.S. Senator
Guy M. Gillette
Democratic

Iowa election
Party	Candidate	Votes	%
Democratic	Guy Gillette (Incumbent)	413,788	49.74%
Republican	Lester J. Dickinson	410,983	49.41%
Farmer–Labor	George F. Buresch	4,723	0.57%
National Progressives of America	Raymond E. Hanke	1,525	0.18%
Prohibition	G. W. Bauseman	820	0.10%
Majority		2,805	0.33%
Turnout		831,839	
Democratic hold			

== Kansas ==
1938 United States Senate election in Kansas
- November 8, 1938
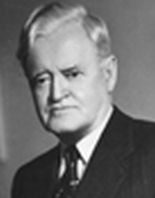

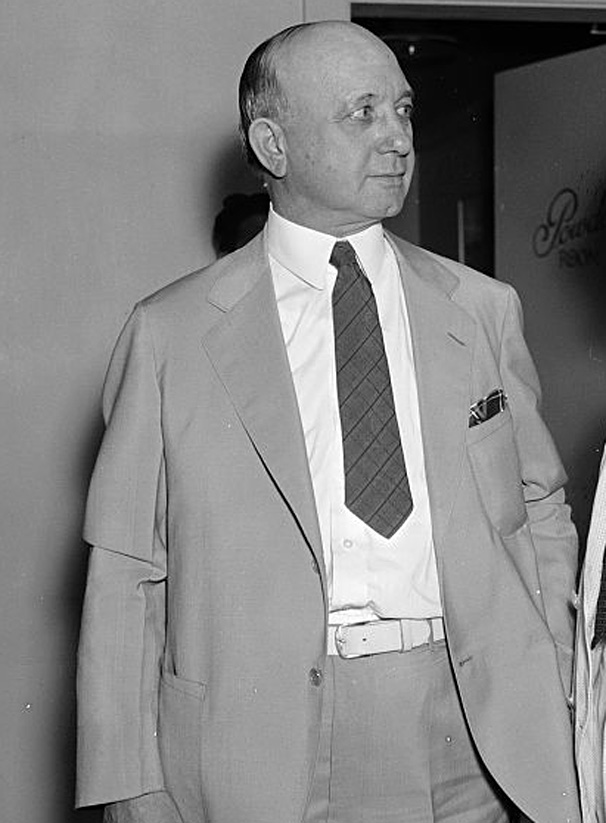
Nominee	Clyde M. Reed	George McGill
Party	Republican	Democratic
Popular vote	419,532	326,774
Percentage	56.21%	43.78%
- County results Reed: 50–60% 60–70% McGill: 50–60%
U.S. senator before election
George McGill
Democratic
Elected U.S. Senator
Clyde M. Reed
Republican

This is the last time that a Senator from Kansas lost re-election. Republicans have not lost a Senate election in the state since.

Kansas election
Party	Candidate	Votes	%
Republican	Clyde M. Reed	419,532	56.21%
Democratic	George McGill (Incumbent)	326,774	43.78%
Independent	Joe Corpstein	99	0.01%
Majority		92,758	12.43%
Turnout		746,405	
Republican gain from Democratic			

== Kentucky ==
1938 United States Senate election in Kentucky
- November 8, 1938
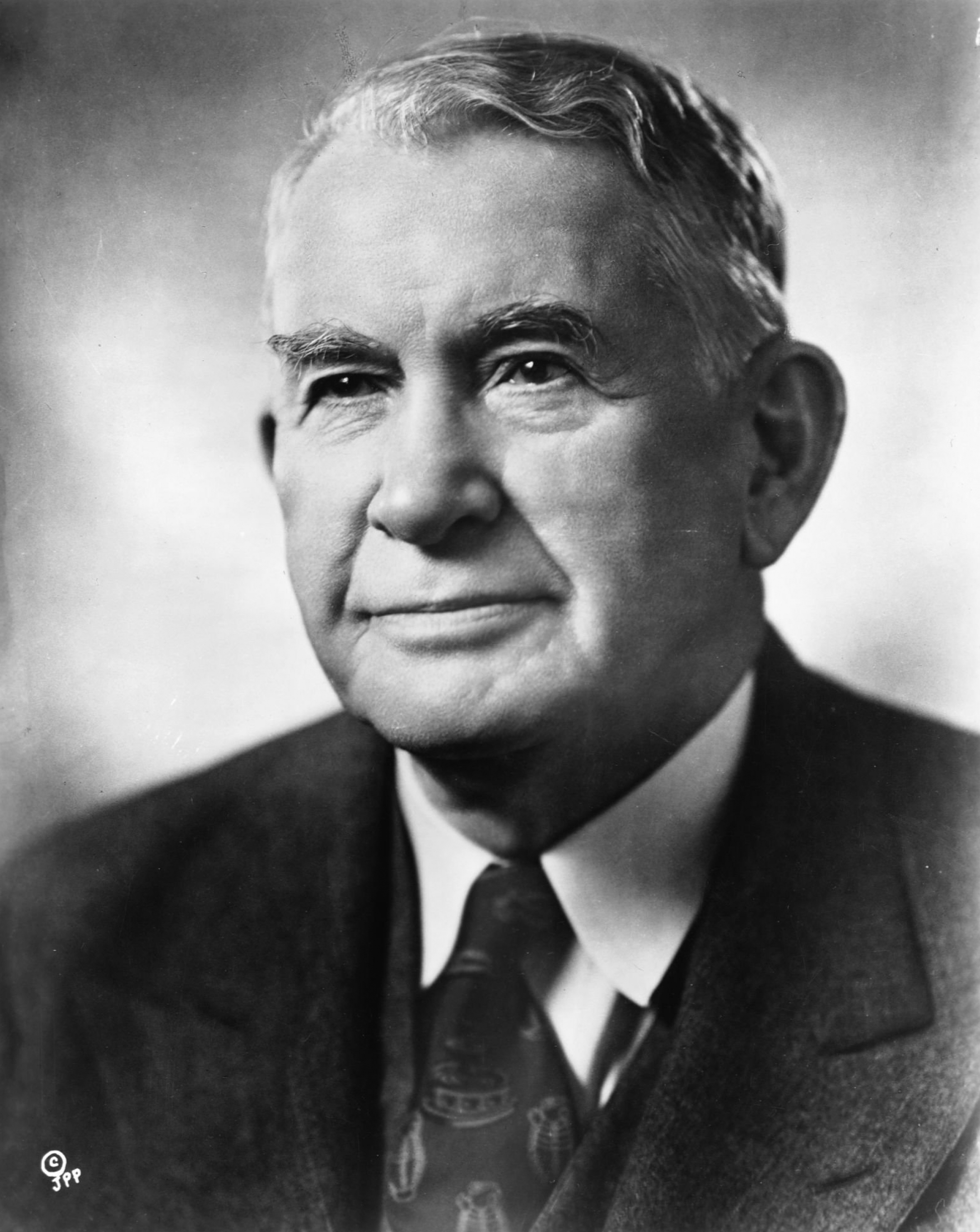

Nominee	Alben W. Barkley	John P. Haswell
Party	Democratic	Republican
Popular vote	346,735	212,266
Percentage	62.03%	37.97%
- County results Barkley: 50–60% 60–70% 70–80% 80–90% >90% Haswell: 50–60% 60–70% 70–80% 80–90%
U.S. senator before election
Alben W. Barkley
Democratic
Elected U.S. senator
Alben W. Barkley
Democratic

Kentucky election
Party	Candidate	Votes	%
Democratic	Alben W. Barkley (Incumbent)	346,735	62.03%
Republican	John P. Haswell	212,266	37.97%
Democratic	Happy Chandler (write-in)	20	0.00%
Majority		134,469	22.06%
Turnout		559,021	
Democratic hold			

== Louisiana ==
Louisiana election
Party	Candidate	Votes	%
Democratic	John H. Overton (Incumbent)	151,582	99.84%
Independent	Maurice E. Clark	250	0.16%
Majority		151,332	99.68%
Turnout		151,832	
Democratic hold			

== Maryland ==
1938 United States Senate election in Maryland
- November 8, 1938
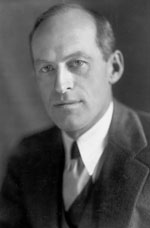

Nominee	Millard Tydings	Oscar Leser
Party	Democratic	Republican
Popular vote	357,245	153,253
Percentage	68.28%	29.29%
- County results Tydings: 50–60% 60–70% 70–80%
U.S. senator before election
Millard Tydings
Democratic
Elected U.S. Senator
Millard Tydings
Democratic

Maryland election
Party	Candidate	Votes	%
Democratic	Millard Tydings (Incumbent)	357,245	68.28%
Republican	Oscar Lesser	153,253	29.29%
Union	George W. Hunt	5,784	1.11%
Socialist	Elisabeth Gilman	3,311	0.63%
American Labor	Frank N. H. Lang	2,330	0.45%
Communist	Harry Straw	1,301	0.25%
Majority		203,992	38.99%
Turnout		523,238	
Democratic hold			

== Missouri ==
1938 United States Senate election in Missouri
- November 8, 1938
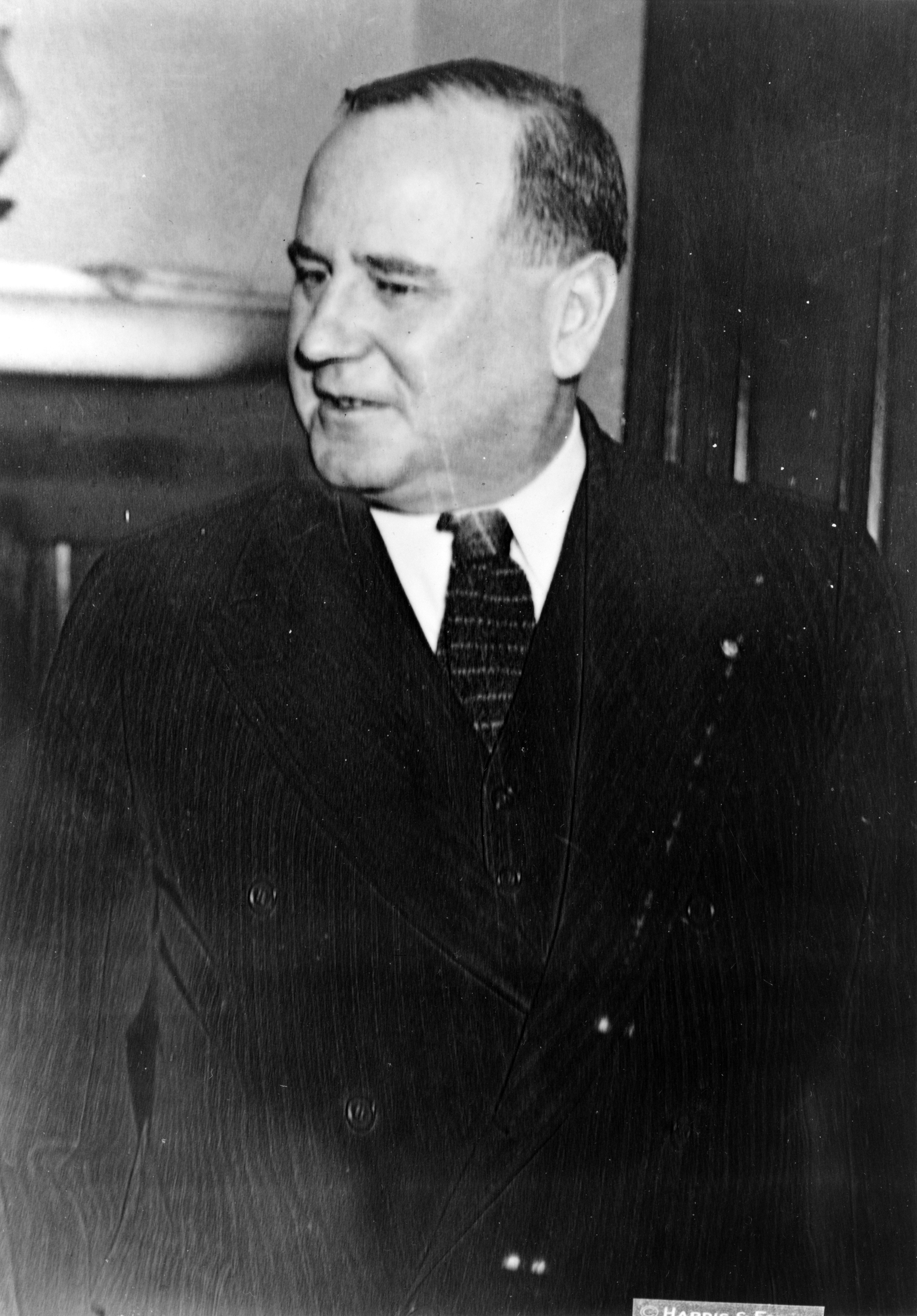

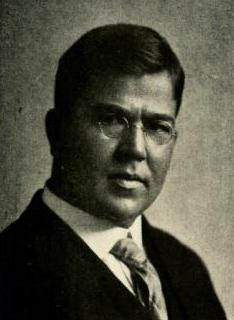
Nominee	Bennett Champ Clark	Henry S. Caulfield
Party	Democratic	Republican
Popular vote	757,587	488,687
Percentage	60.69%	39.15%
- County results Clark: 50–60% 60–70% 70–80% 80–90% Caulfield: 50–60% 60–70% 70–80%
U.S. senator before election
Bennett Champ Clark
Democratic
Elected U.S. senator
Bennett Champ Clark
Democratic

Missouri election
Party	Candidate	Votes	%
Democratic	Bennett Champ Clark (Incumbent)	757,587	60.69%
Republican	Henry S. Caulfield	488,687	39.15%
Socialist	J. G. Hodges	1,712	0.14%
Socialist Labor	Karl L. Oberhue	292	0.02%
Majority		268,900	21.54%
Turnout		1,248,278	
Democratic hold			

== Nevada ==
1938 United States Senate election in Nevada
- November 8, 1938
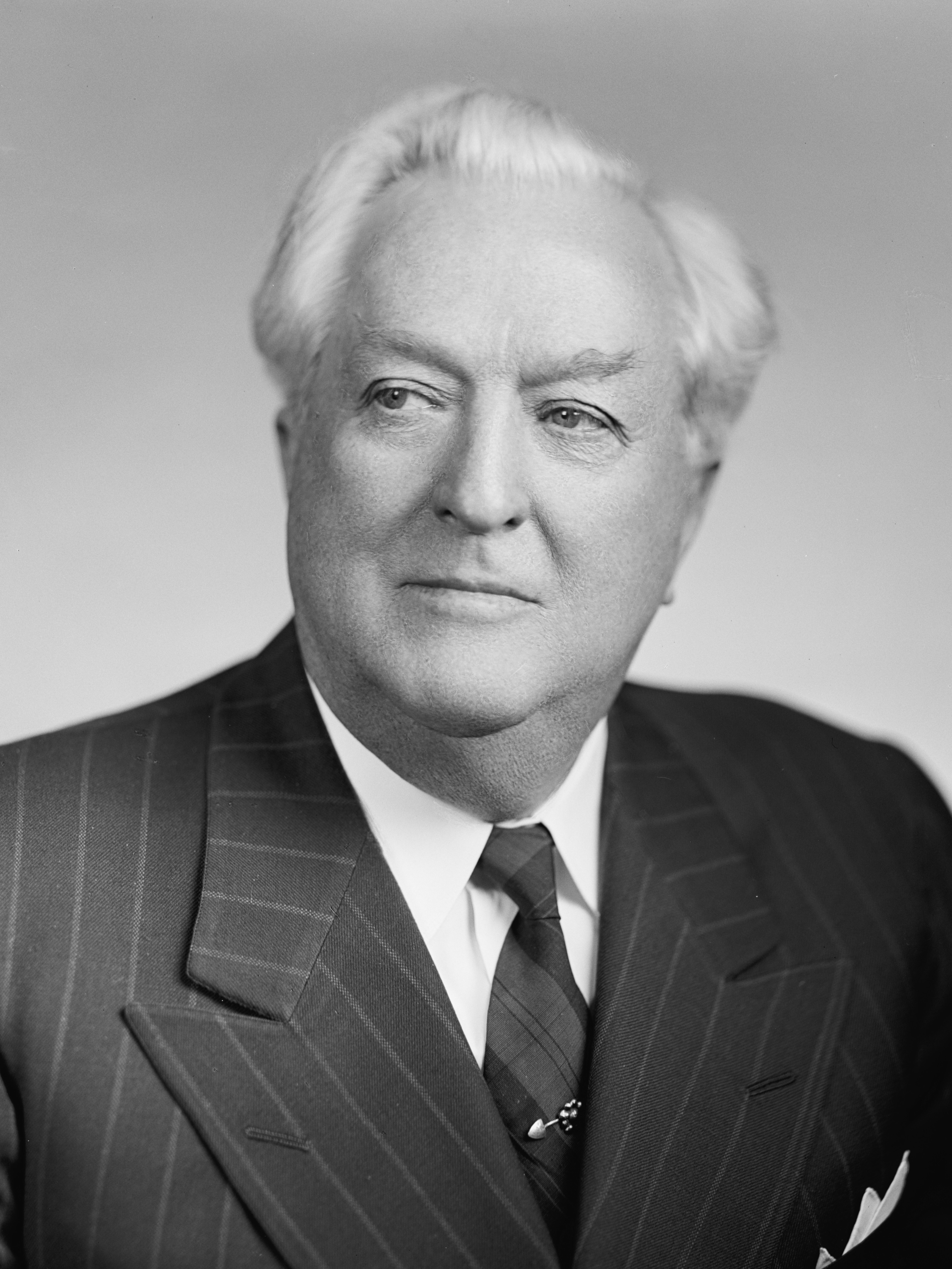

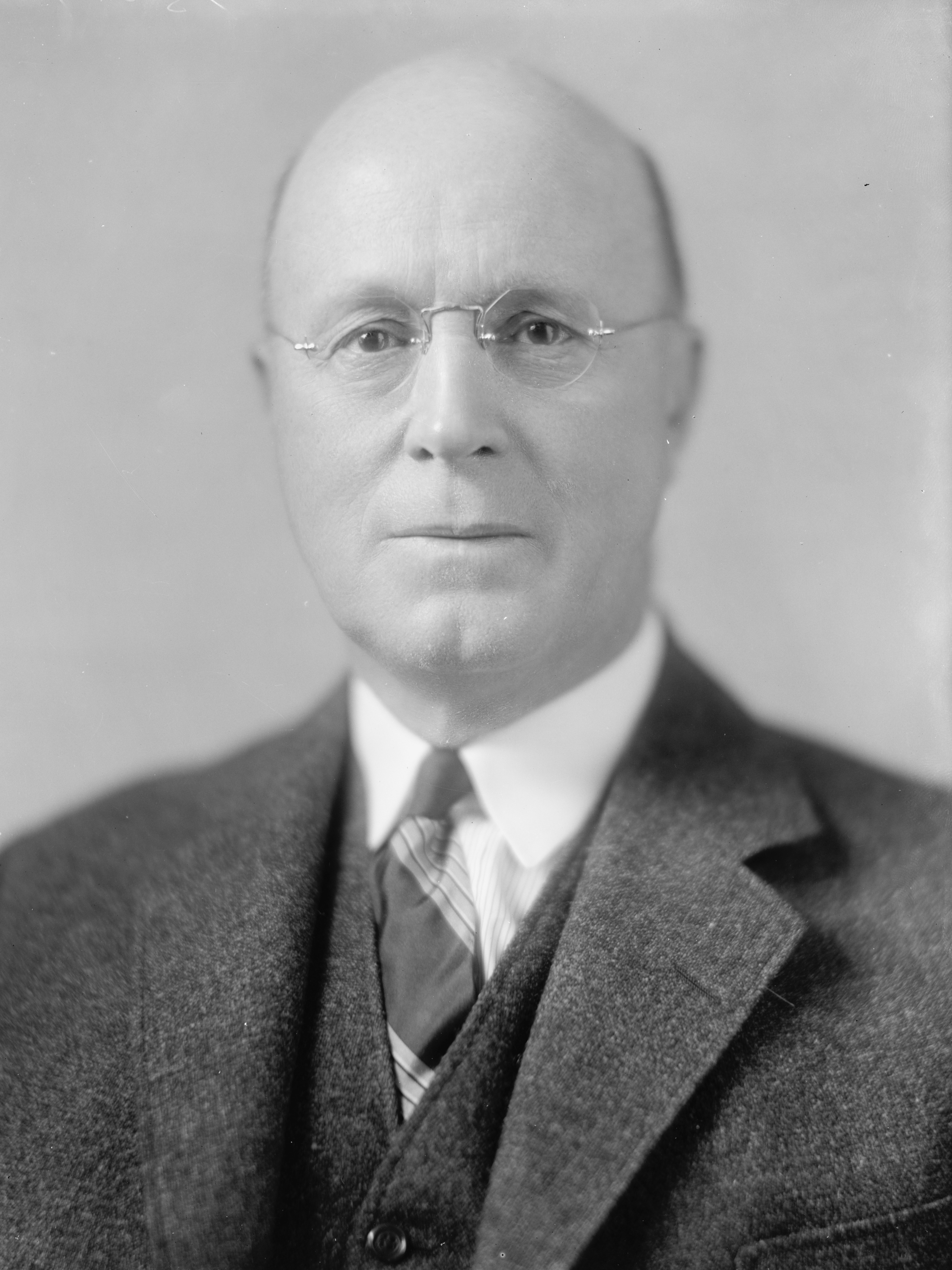
Nominee	Pat McCarran	Tasker Oddie
Party	Democratic	Republican
Popular vote	27,406	19,078
Percentage	58.96%	41.04%
- County results McCarran: 50–60% 60–70% 70–80% 80–90% Oddie: 50–60%
U.S. senator before election
Pat McCarran
Democratic
Elected U.S. Senator
Pat McCarran
Democratic

Nevada election
Party	Candidate	Votes	%
Democratic	Pat McCarran (Incumbent)	27,406	58.96%
Republican	Tasker Oddie	19,078	41.04%
Majority		8,328	17.92%
Turnout		46,484	
Democratic hold			

== New Hampshire ==
1938 United States Senate election in New Hampshire
- November 8, 1938
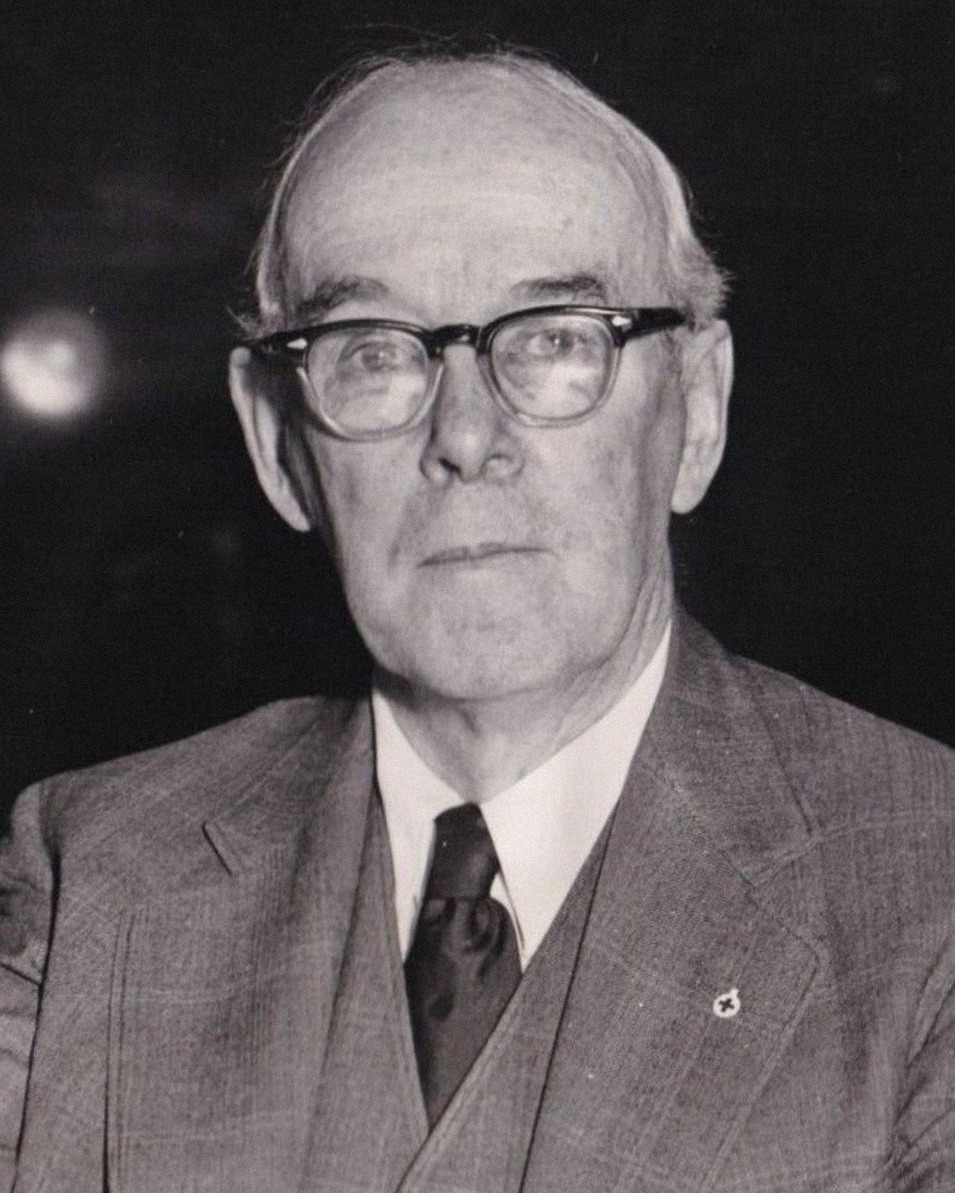

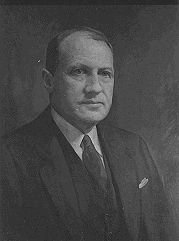
Nominee	Charles W. Tobey	Fred H. Brown
Party	Republican	Democratic
Popular vote	100,633	84,920
Percentage	54.23%	45.77%
- Tobey: 50–60% 60–70% 70–80% 80–90% 90-100% Brown: 50–60% 60–70% 80–90%
Senator before election
Fred H. Brown
Democratic
Elected Senator
Charles W. Tobey
Republican

New Hampshire election
Party	Candidate	Votes	%
Republican	Charles W. Tobey	100,633	54.23%
Democratic	Fred H. Brown (Incumbent)	84,920	45.77%
Majority		15,713	8.46%
Turnout		185,553	
Republican gain from Democratic			

== New Jersey (special) ==
1938 United States Senate election in New Jersey
- November 8, 1938
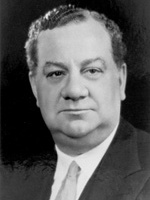

Nominee	William Warren Barbour	William H. J. Ely
Party	Republican	Democratic
Popular vote	816,667	704,159
Percentage	52.98%	45.68%
- County results Barbour: 50–60% 60–70% 70–80% Ely: 50–60% 70–80%
U.S. senator before election
John Gerald Milton
Democratic
Elected U.S. senator
W. Warren Barbour
Republican

New Jersey special election
Party	Candidate	Votes	%
Republican	William Warren Barbour	816,667	52.98%
Democratic	William H. J. Ely	704,159	45.68%
Prohibition	Louis H. Kelley	8,201	0.53%
Socialist	John Palangio	3,671	0.24%
Townsend	Fred Turner	3,521	0.23%
Communist	William Norman	3,515	0.23%
Socialist Labor	John C. Butterworth	1,873	0.12%
Majority		112,508	7.30%
Turnout		1,541,607	
Republican gain from Democratic			

== New York ==
There were 2 elections due to the June 17, 1938, death of three-term Democrat Royal S. Copeland.

=== New York (regular) ===
1938 United States Senate election in New York
- November 8, 1938
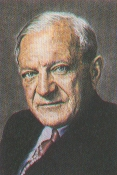

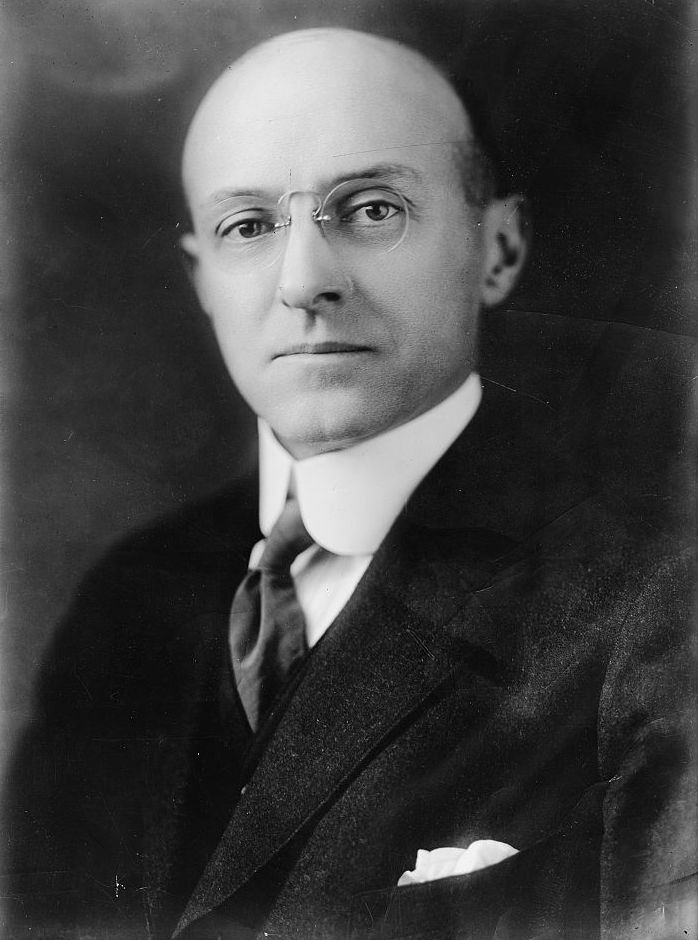
Nominee	Robert F. Wagner	John Lord O'Brian
Party	Democratic	Republican
Alliance	American Labor	Independent Progressive
Popular vote	2,497,029	2,058,615
Percentage	54.48%	44.92%
- County Results; Wagner: 50–60% 60–70% 70–80% O'Brian: 50–60% 60–70% 70–80%
Senator before election
Robert F. Wagner
Democratic
Elected Senator
Robert F. Wagner
Democratic

New York Republicans nominated John Lord O'Brian for the U.S. Senate. Democrats re-nominated the incumbent Wagner. The American Labor Party endorsed Wagner.

1938 United States Senate election in New York
Party	Candidate	Votes	%
Democratic	Robert F. Wagner (Incumbent)	2,098,919	45.80%
American Labor	Robert F. Wagner (Incumbent)	398,410	8.69%
Total	Robert F. Wagner (Incumbent)	2,497,029	54.48%
Republican	John Lord O'Brian	2,046,794	44.66%
Independent Progressive	John Lord O'Brian	11,821	0.26%
'Total'	John Lord O'Brian	2,058,615	44.92%
Socialist	Herman J. Hahn (Note: Rev. Herman J. Hahn, of Buffalo, ran also for Lieutenant Governor in 1928 and 1936.)	23,553	0.51%
Socialist Labor	O. Martin Olson (Note: O. Martin Olson, of Jamestown, ran also for Comptroller in 1934)	3,851	0.08%
Total votes		4,583,048	100.00%

=== New York (special) ===
1938 United States Senate special election in New York
- November 8, 1938
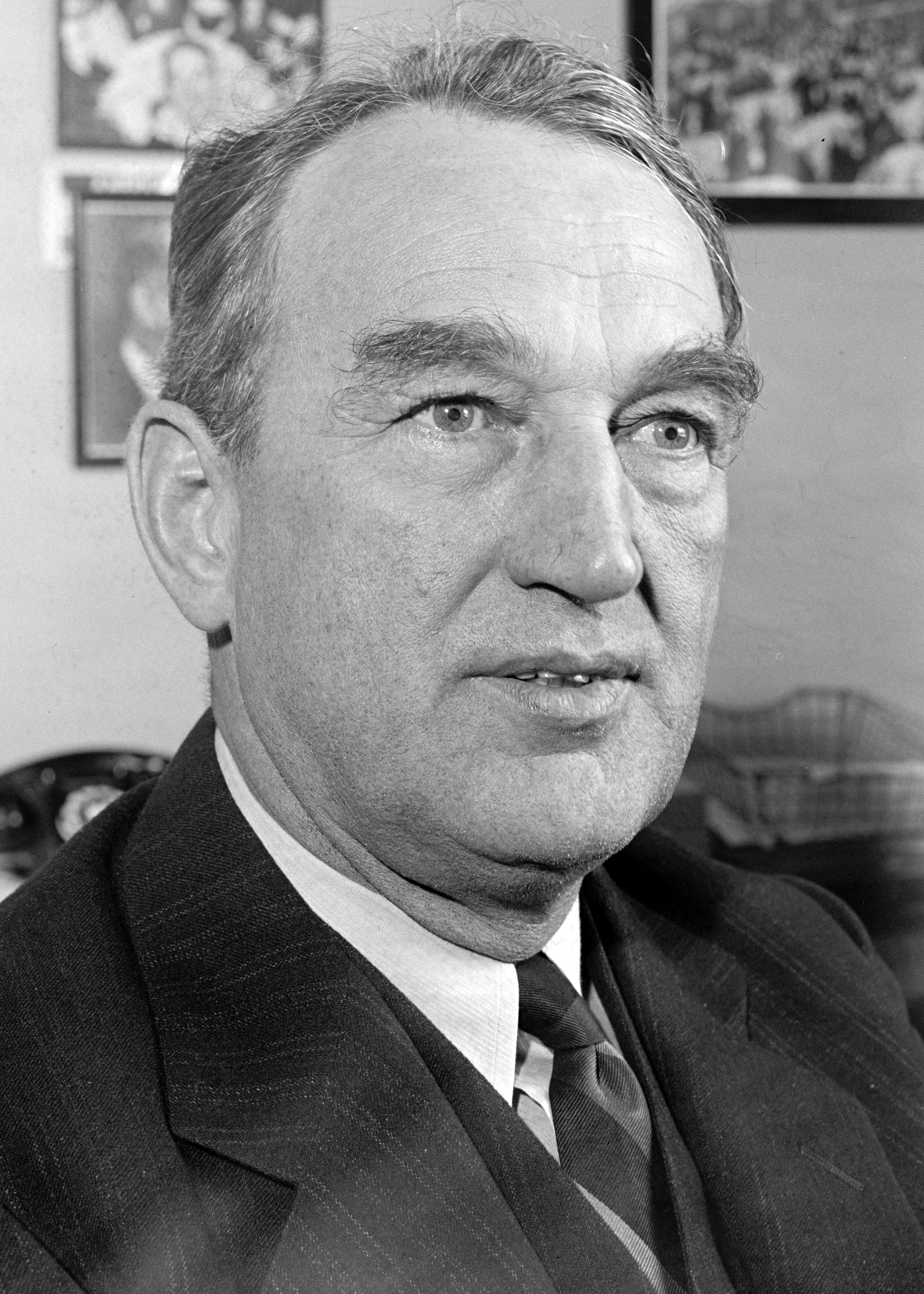
Nominee	James M. Mead	Edward F. Corsi
Party	Democratic	Republican
Alliance	American Labor Party	Ind. Progressive
Popular vote	2,438,904	2,083,666
Percentage	53.93%	46.08%
- Mead: 50–60% 60–70% 70–80% Corsi: 50–60% 60–70% 70–80%
U.S. senator before election
Vacant
Elected U.S. Senator
James M. Mead
Democratic

New York Republicans nominated Edward Corsi for the short term to fill the vacancy caused by the death of Royal S. Copeland. Democrats nominated James M. Mead. The American Labor party endorsed Mead.

Democratic ticket		Republican ticket		American Labor ticket		Socialist ticket	
James M. Mead	2,060,876	Edward F. Corsi	2,083,666	James M. Mead	378,028	Harry W. Laidler	27,161

== North Carolina ==
1938 United States Senate election in North Carolina
- November 7, 1938
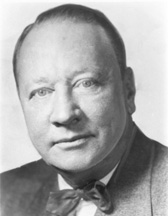

Nominee	Robert R. Reynolds	Charles A. Jonas
Party	Democratic	Republican
Popular vote	316,685	179,461
Percentage	63.83%	36.17%
- Results by county Reynolds: 50–60% 60–70% 70–80% 80–90% >90% Jonas: 50–60% 60–70%
Senator before election
Robert Rice Reynolds
Democratic
Elected Senator
Robert Rice Reynolds
Democratic

North Carolina election
Party	Candidate	Votes	%
Democratic	Robert Rice Reynolds (Incumbent)	316,685	63.80%
Republican	Charles A. Jonas	179,650	36.20%
Majority		137,035	27.60%
Turnout		496,335	
Democratic hold			

== North Dakota ==
1938 United States Senate election in North Dakota
- November 8, 1938
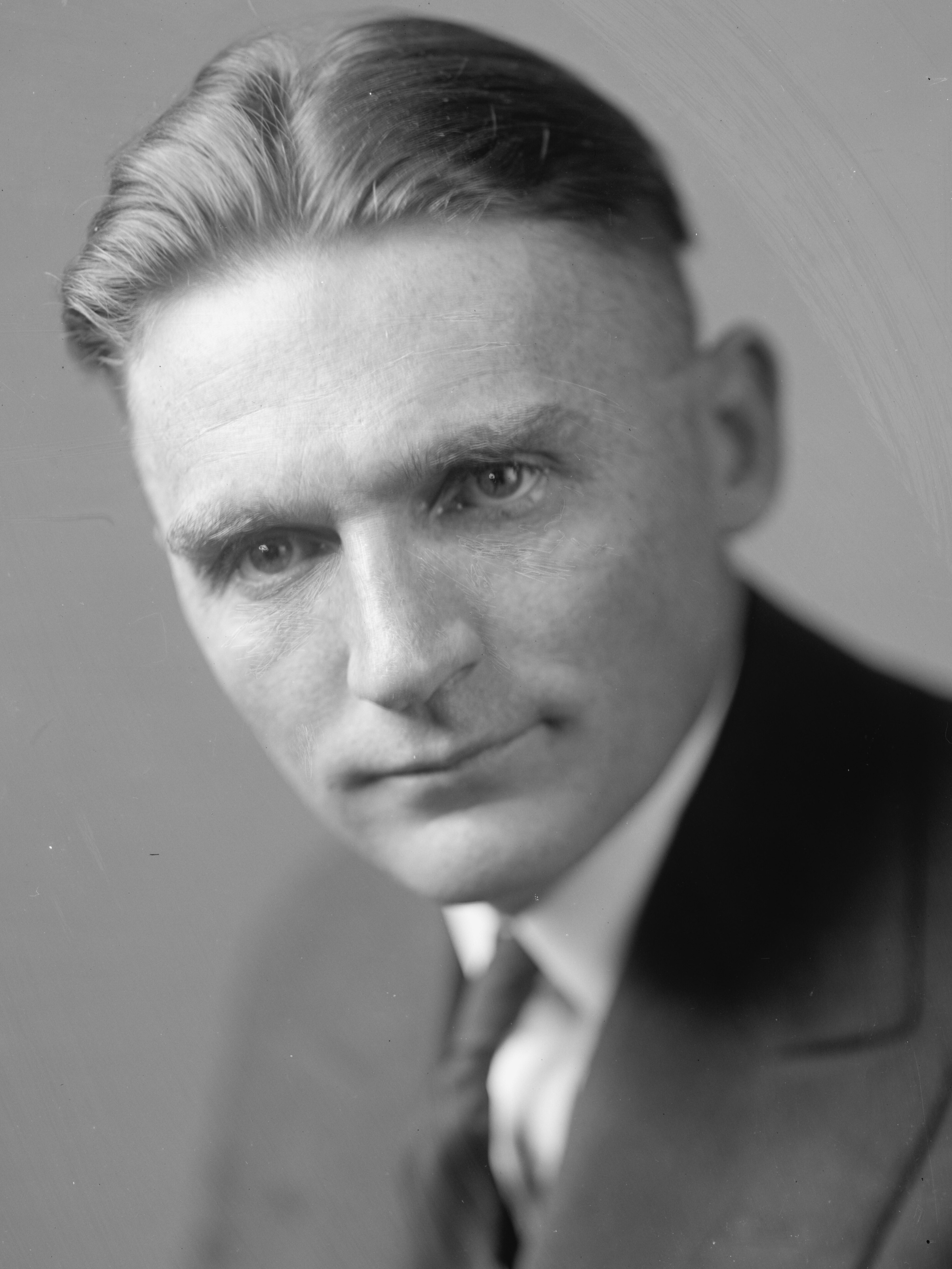

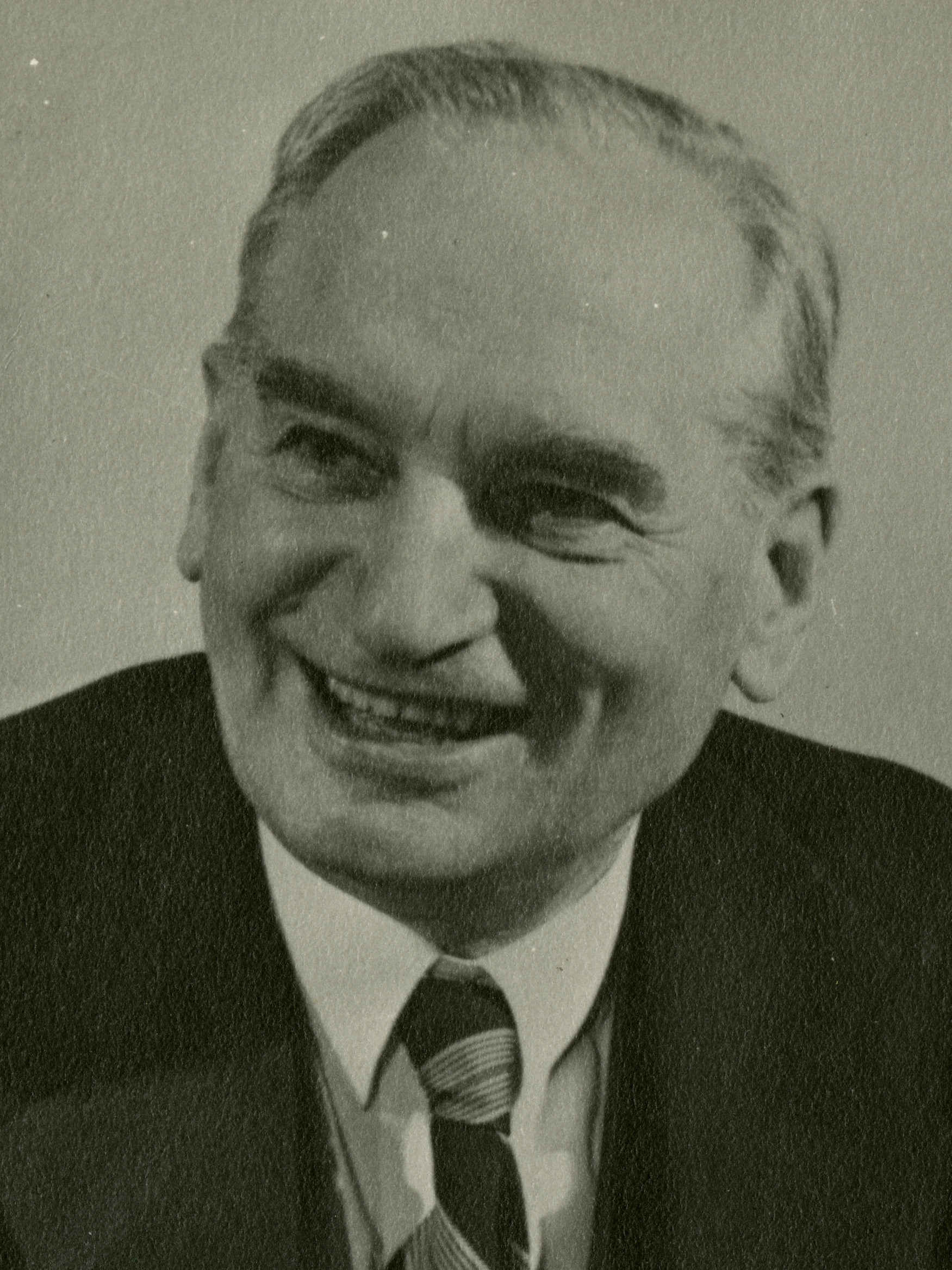

Nominee	Gerald Nye	William Langer	J. J. Nygaard
Party	Republican	Independent	Democratic
Popular vote	131,907	65,612	19,244
Percentage	50.12%	42.56%	7.31%
- County results Nye: 40–50% 50–60% 60–70% Langer: 40–50% 50–60% 60–70%
U.S. senator before election
Gerald Nye
Republican
Elected U.S. Senator
Gerald Nye
Republican

North Dakota election
Party	Candidate	Votes	%
Republican	Gerald Nye (Incumbent)	131,907	50.12%
Independent	William Langer	112,007	42.56%
Democratic	J. J. Nygard	19,244	7.31%
Majority		19,900	7.56%
Turnout		263,158	
Republican hold			

== Ohio ==
1938 United States Senate election in Ohio
- November 8, 1938
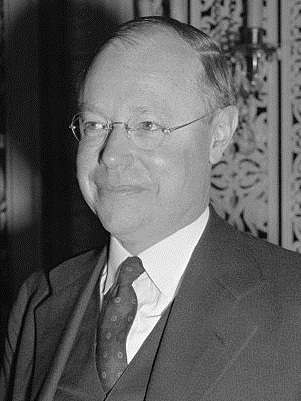

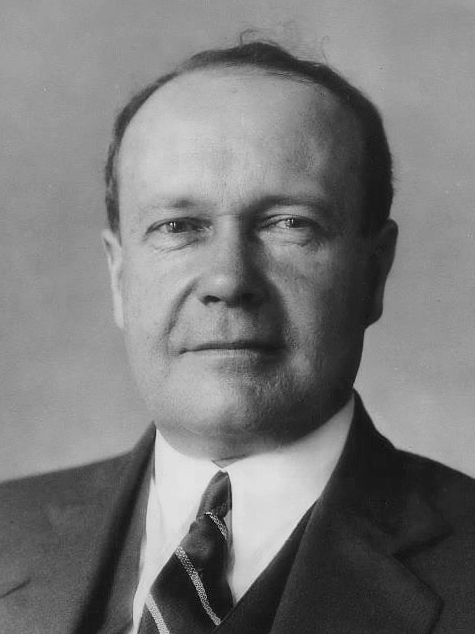
Nominee	Robert A. Taft	Robert J. Bulkley
Party	Republican	Democratic
Popular vote	1,255,414	1,085,792
Percentage	53.62%	46.38%
- County results Taft: 50–60% 60–70% 70–80% Bulkley: 50–60% 60–70%
U.S. senator before election
Robert J. Bulkley
Democratic
Elected U.S. Senator
Robert A. Taft
Republican

Ohio election
Party	Candidate	Votes	%
Republican	Robert A. Taft	1,255,414	53.62%
Democratic	Robert J. Bulkley (Incumbent)	1,085,792	46.38%
Majority		169,622	7.24%
Turnout		2,341,206	
Republican gain from Democratic			

== Oklahoma ==
1938 United States Senate election in Oklahoma
- November 8, 1938
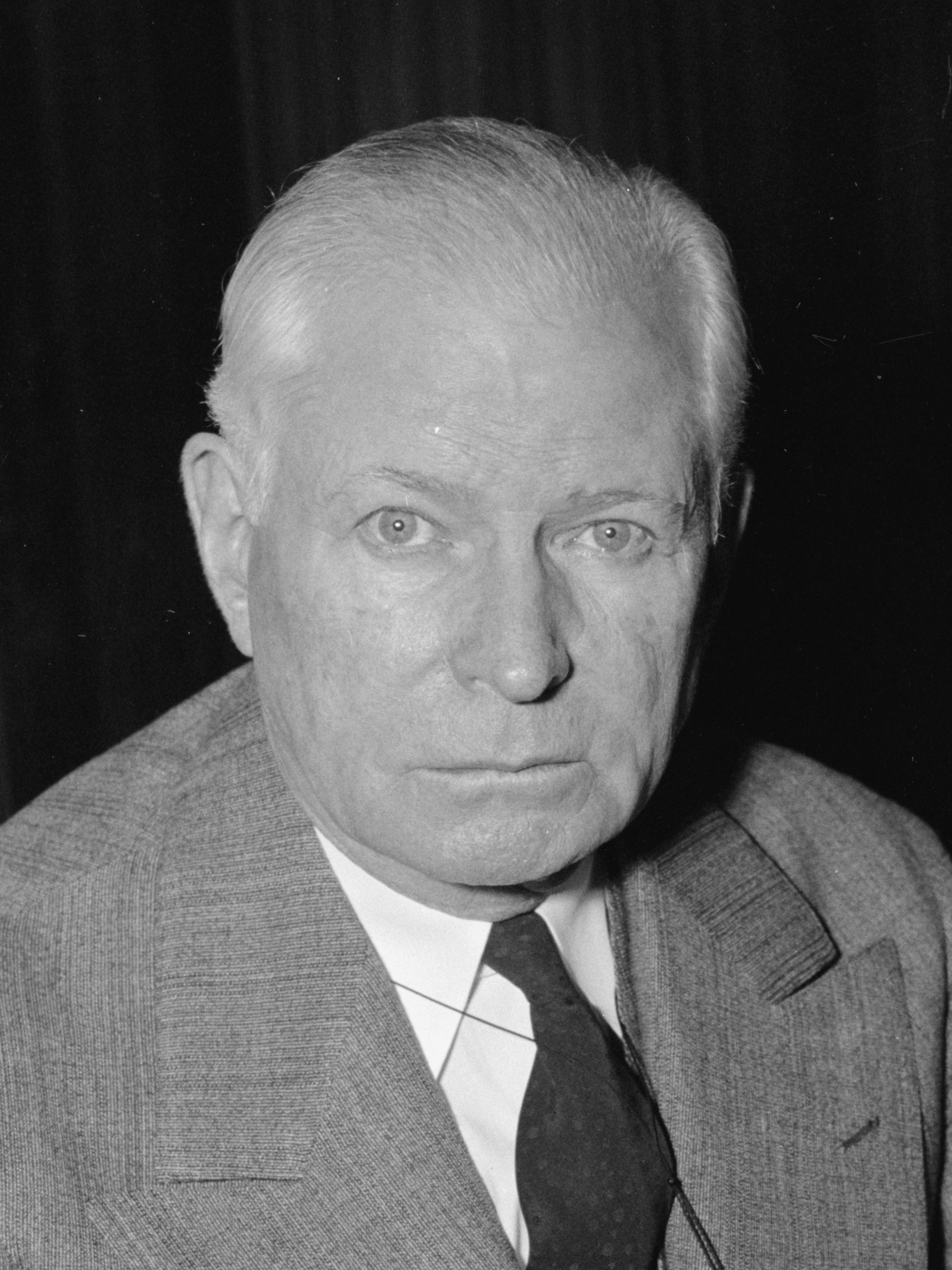

Nominee	Elmer Thomas	Harry O. Glasser
Party	Democratic	Republican
Popular vote	307,936	159,734
Percentage	65.37%	33.91%
- County results Thomas: 40–50% 50–60% 60–70% 70–80% 80–90% Glasser: 40–50% 50–60%
U.S. senator before election
Elmer Thomas
Democratic
Elected U.S. Senator
Elmer Thomas
Democratic

Oklahoma election
Party	Candidate	Votes	%
Democratic	Elmer Thomas (Incumbent)	307,936	65.37%
Republican	Harry G. Glasser	159,734	33.91%
Prohibition	P. C. Nelson	2,220	0.47%
Independent	Raymond B. Clark	603	0.13%
Independent	Herndon J. Thompson	573	0.12%
Majority		148,202	31.46%
Turnout		471,066	
Democratic hold			

== Oregon ==
There were 2 elections for the same seat, due to the January 31, 1938, resignation of two-term Republican Frederick Steiwer. Democratic businessman Alfred E. Reames was appointed February 1, 1938, to continue the term, pending a special election, but he did not run in either the special or the general elections.

=== Oregon (special) ===
1938 United States Senate special election in Oregon
- November 8, 1938
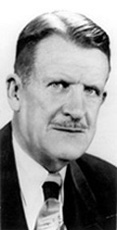

Nominee	Alexander G. Barry	Robert A. Miller
Party	Republican	Democratic
Popular vote	180,815	152,773
Percentage	54.20%	45.80%
- County results Barry: 50–60% 60–70% Miller: 50–60%
U.S. senator before election
Alfred E. Reames
Democratic
Elected U.S. Senator
Alexander G. Barry
Republican

Republican Alexander G. Barry was elected to finish the term, but was not a candidate for the next term.

Oregon special election
Party	Candidate	Votes	%
Republican	Alexander G. Barry	180,815	54.20%
Democratic	Robert A. Miller	152,773	45.80%
None	Scattering	3	0.00%
Majority		28,042	8.40%
Turnout		333,591	
Republican gain from Democratic			

=== Oregon (regular) ===
1938 United States Senate election in Oregon
- November 8, 1938
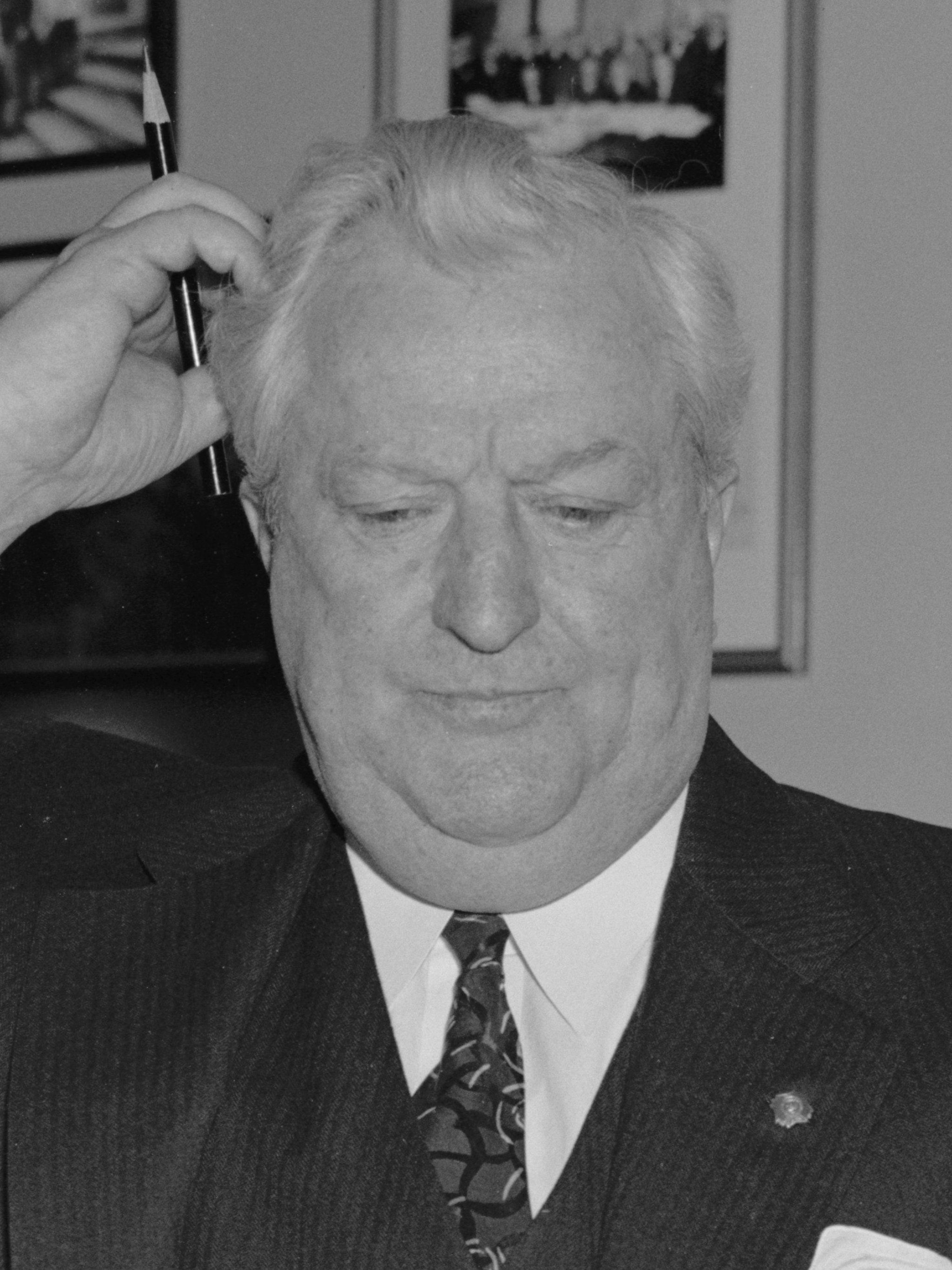

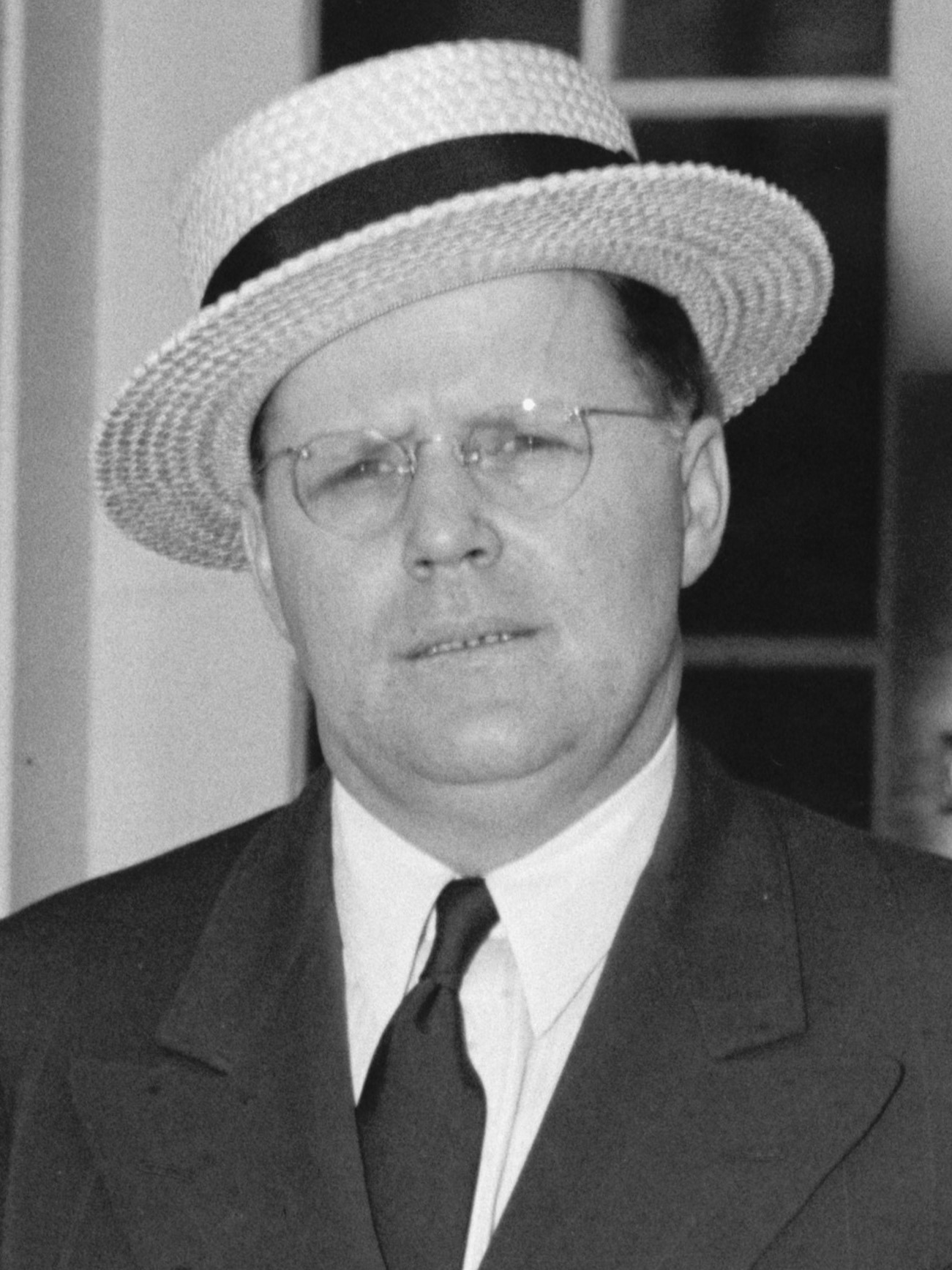
Nominee	Rufus C. Holman	Willis Mahoney
Party	Republican	Democratic
Popular vote	203,120	167,135
Percentage	54.86%	45.14%
- County results Holman: 50–60% 60–70% 70–80% Mahoney: 50–60%
U.S. senator before election
Alfred Reames
Democratic
Elected U.S. Senator
Rufus C. Holman
Republican

Oregon general election
Party	Candidate	Votes	%
Republican	Rufus C. Holman	203,120	54.86%
Democratic	Willis Mahoney	167,135	45.14%
None	Scattering	6	0.00%
Majority		35,985	9.72%
Turnout		370,261	
Republican gain from Democratic			

== Pennsylvania ==
1938 United States Senate election in Pennsylvania
- November 8, 1938
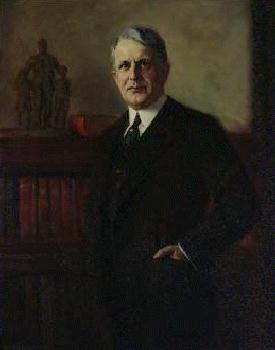

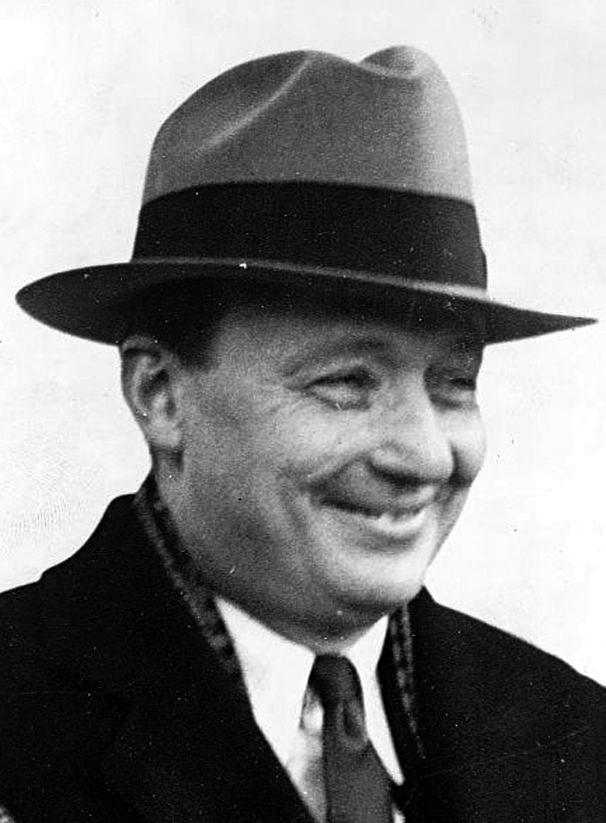
Nominee	James J. Davis	George Howard Earle III
Party	Republican	Democratic
Popular vote	2,086,931	1,694,367
Percentage	54.70%	44.41%
- County Results: Davis: 40–50% 50–60% 60–70% 70–80% Earle: 50–60%
U.S. senator before election
James J. Davis
Republican
Elected U.S. Senator
James J. Davis
Republican

General election results
Party	Candidate	Votes	%
Republican	James J. Davis (incumbent)	2,086,931	54.70%
Democratic	George H. Earle	1,694,367	44.41%
Socialist	David H. H. Felix	20,155	0.53%
Prohibition	Forest S. Van Valin	9,327	0.24%
Pathfinders	Reginald B. Naugle	2,508	0.07%
Communist	Pat Toohey	1,530	0.04%
None	Scattering	104	0.00%
Majority		392,564	10.29%
Turnout		3,814,922	
Republican hold			

== South Carolina ==
1938 Democratic Senate primary election in South Carolina
- August 30, 1938
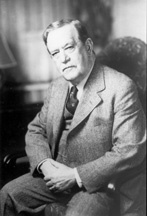

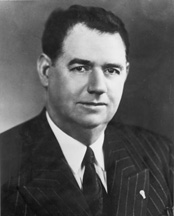
Nominee	Ellison D. Smith	Olin D. Johnston
Party	Democratic	Democratic
Popular vote	186,579	150,437
Percentage	55.36%	44.64%
- County results Smith: 50–60% 60–70% 70–80% Johnston: 50–60% 60–70%
U.S. senator before election
Ellison D. Smith
Democratic
Elected U.S. Senator
Ellison D. Smith
Democratic

South Carolina election
Party	Candidate	Votes	%
Democratic	Ellison D. Smith (Incumbent)	45,351	98.89%
Republican	J. D. E. Meyer	508	1.11%
None	Scattering	2	0.00%
Majority		44,843	97.78%
Turnout		45,861	
Democratic hold			

== South Dakota ==
There were 2 elections for the same seat due to the December 20, 1936, death of three-term Republican Peter Norbeck. Democrat Herbert Hitchcock was appointed December 29, 1936, to continue the term, pending a special election.

=== South Dakota (special) ===
1938 United States Senate special election in South Dakota
- November 8, 1938
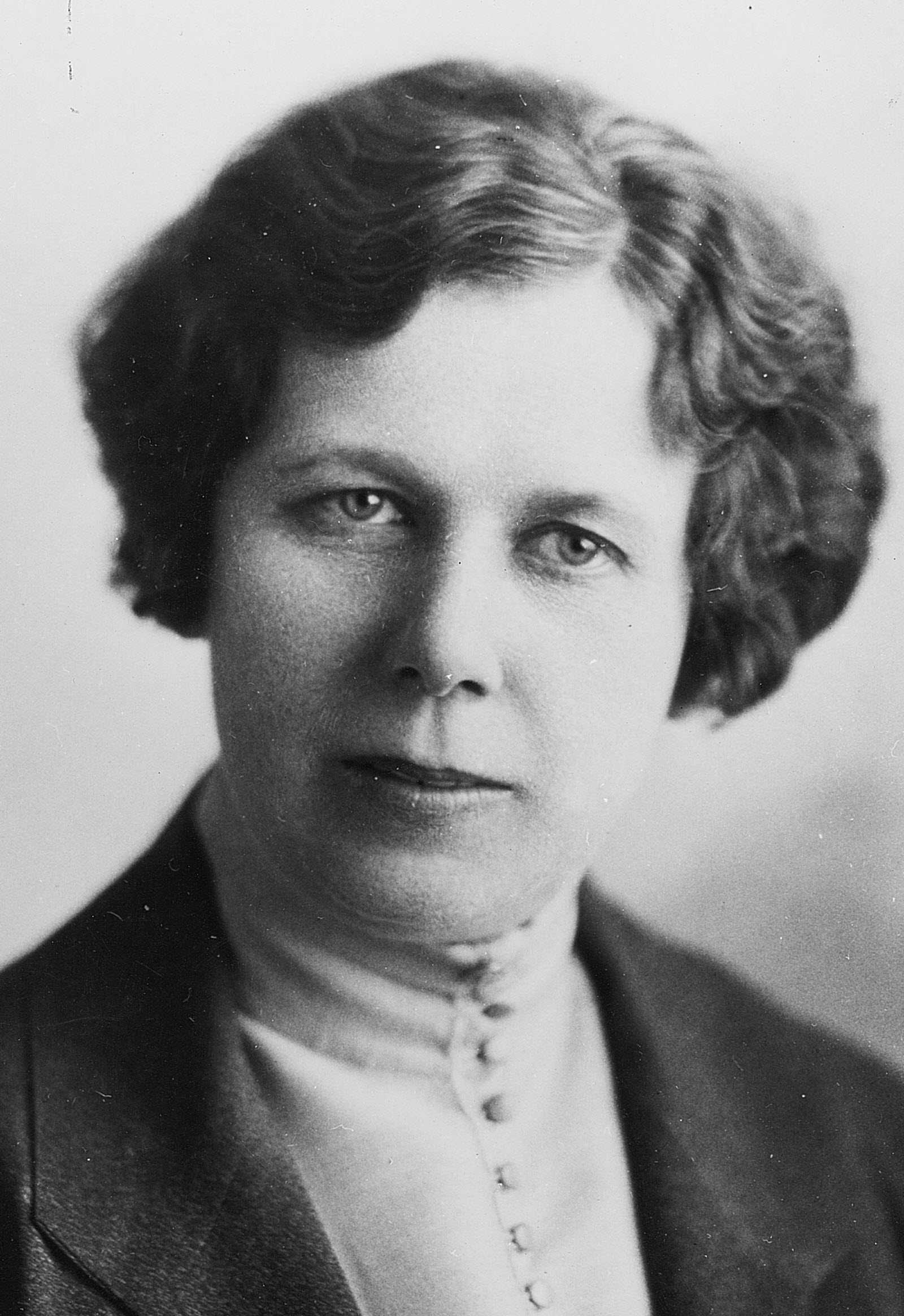
Nominee	Gladys Pyle	John T. McCullen
Party	Republican	Democratic
Popular vote	155,292	112,177
Percentage	58.06%	41.94%
- County results Pyle: 50–60% 60–70% 70–80% 80–90% McCullen: 50–60% Tie: 50% No Vote
U.S. senator before election
Herbert E. Hitchcock
Democratic
Elected U.S. Senator
Gladys Pyle
Republican

South Dakota election
Party	Candidate	Votes	%
Republican	Gladys Pyle	155,292	58.06%
Democratic	John T. McCullen	112,177	41.94%
Majority		43,115	16.12%
Turnout		267,469	
Republican gain from Democratic			

=== South Dakota (regular) ===
1938 United States Senate election in South Dakota
- November 8, 1938
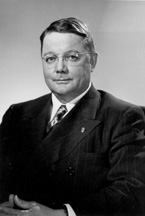

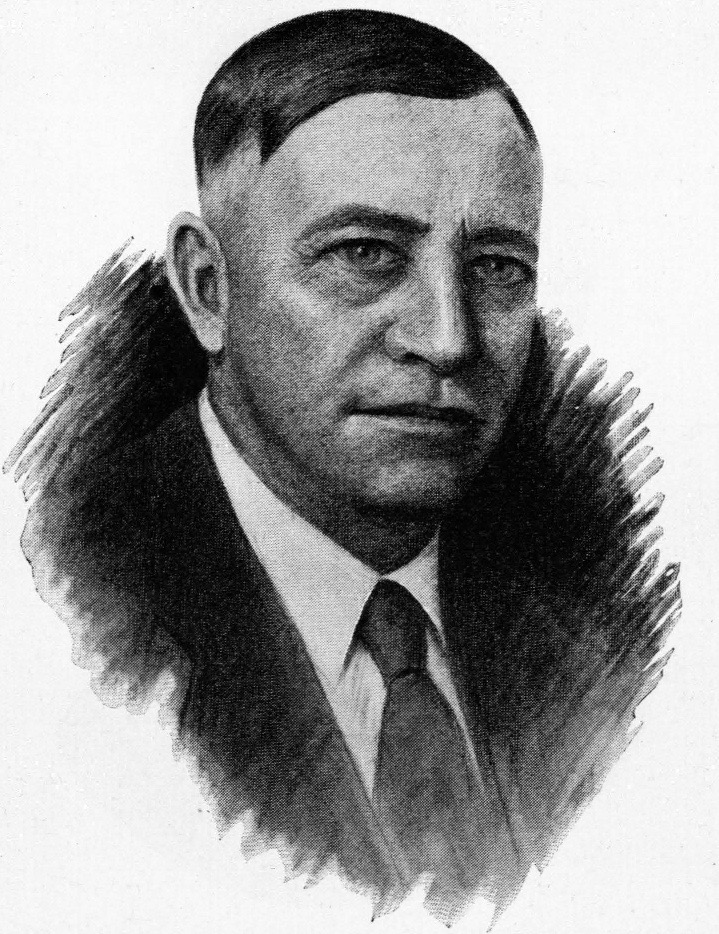
Nominee	Chan Gurney	Tom Berry
Party	Republican	Democratic
Popular vote	146,813	133,064
Percentage	52.46%	47.54%
- County results Gurney: 50–60% 60–70% 70–80% Berry: 50–60% 60–70% No Vote
U.S. senator before election
Herbert E. Hitchcock
Democratic
Elected U.S. Senator
Chan Gurney
Republican

Hitchcock lost the Democratic May 3, 1938, primary for the next term to Governor of South Dakota Tom Berry.

South Dakota general election
Party	Candidate	Votes	%
Republican	John Chandler Gurney	146,813	52.46%
Democratic	Tom Berry	133,064	47.54%
Majority		13,749	4.92%
Turnout		279,877	
Republican gain from Democratic			

== Tennessee (special) ==
1938 United States Senate special election in Tennessee
- November 8, 1938
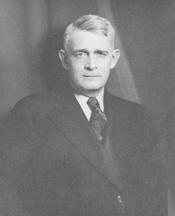
Nominee	Tom Stewart	Harvey G. Fowler
Party	Democratic	Republican
Popular vote	194,028	72,098
Percentage	70.50%	26.20%
Senator before election
George L. Berry
Democratic
Elected Senator
Tom Stewart
Democratic

Tennessee special election
Party	Candidate	Votes	%
Democratic	Tom Stewart	194,028	70.50%
Republican	Harley G. Fowler	72,098	26.20%
Independent	John Randolph Neal Jr.	9,106	3.31%
Majority		21,930	44.30%
Turnout		275,232	
Democratic hold			

== Utah ==
1938 United States Senate election in Utah
- November 8, 1938
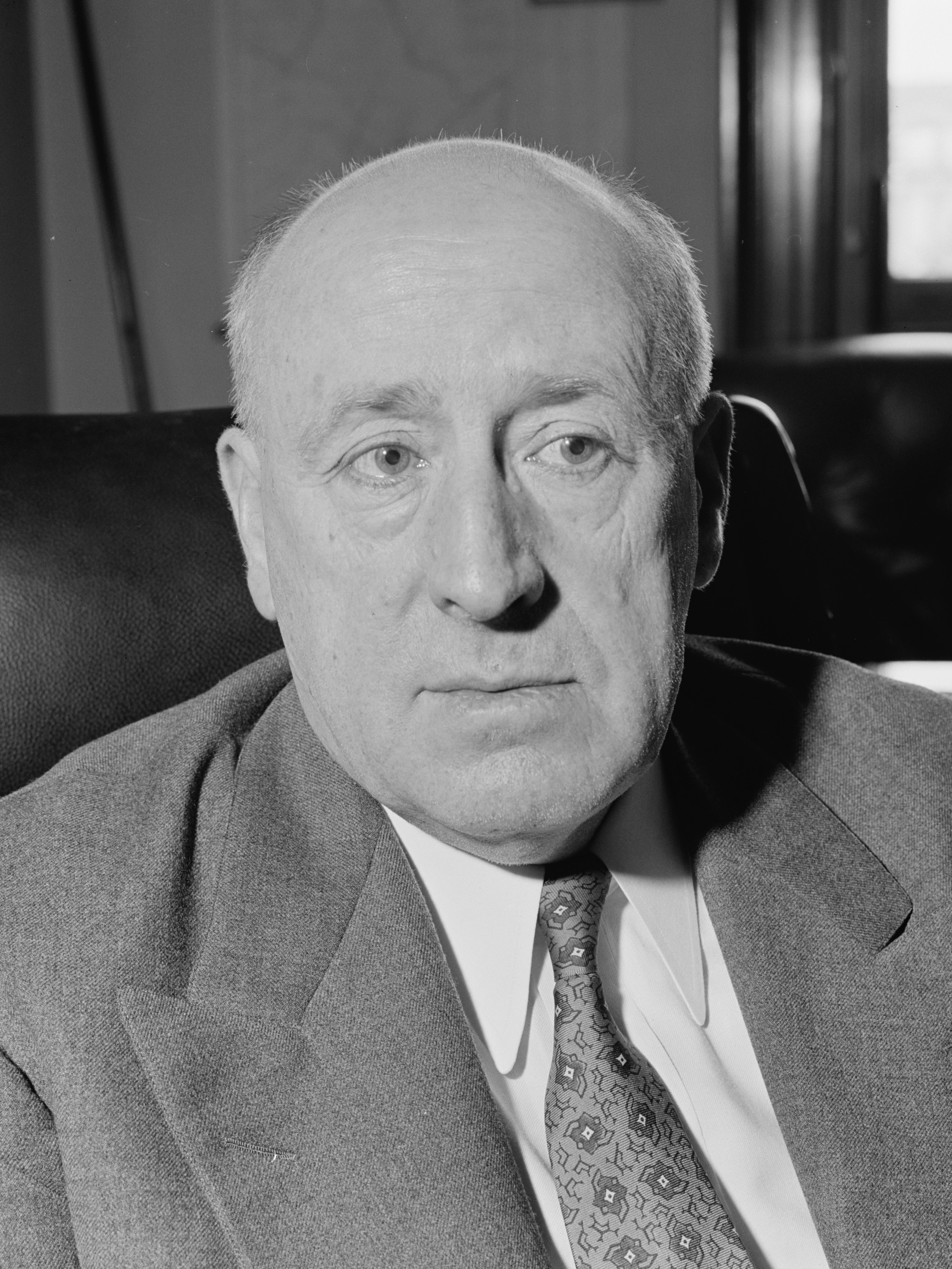

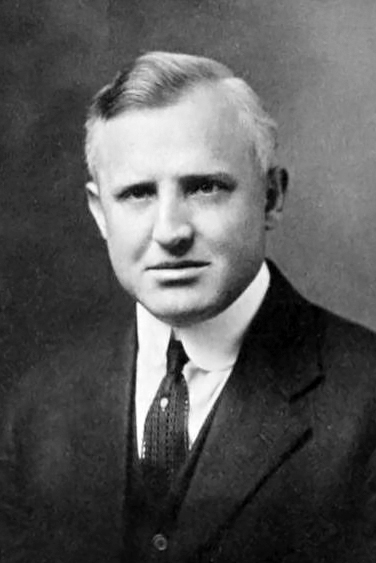
Nominee	Elbert D. Thomas	Franklin S. Harris
Party	Democratic	Republican
Popular vote	102,353	81,071
Percentage	55.80%	44.20%
- County results Thomas: 50–60% 60–70% Harris: 50–60% 60–70%
U.S. senator before election
Elbert D. Thomas
Democratic
Elected U.S. Senator
Elbert D. Thomas
Democratic

Utah election
Party	Candidate	Votes	%
Democratic	Elbert D. Thomas (Incumbent)	102,353	55.80%
Republican	Franklin S. Harris	81,071	44.20%
Majority		21,282	11.60%
Turnout		183,424	
Democratic hold			

== Vermont ==
1938 United States Senate election in Vermont
- November 8, 1938
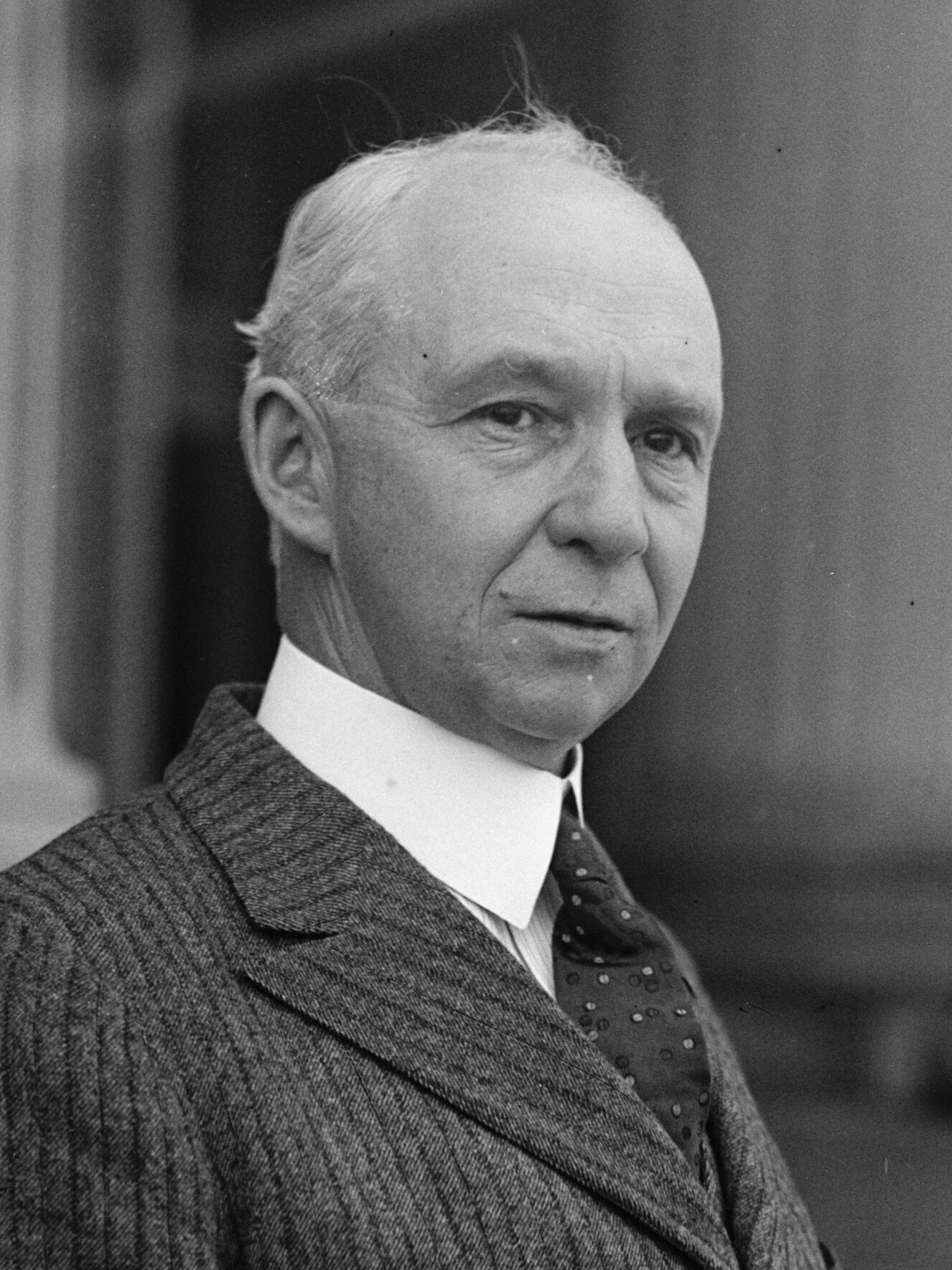

Nominee	Ernest W. Gibson Sr.	John McGrath
Party	Republican	Democratic
Popular vote	73,990	38,673
Percentage	65.7%	34.3%
U.S. senator before election
Ernest W. Gibson Sr.
Republican
Elected U.S. Senator
Ernest W. Gibson Sr.
Republican

Vermont election
Party	Candidate	Votes	%
Republican	Ernest Willard Gibson (Incumbent)	73,990	65.58%
Democratic	John McGrath	38,673	34.28%
None	Scattering	161	0.14%
Majority		35,317	31.30%
Turnout		112,824	
Republican hold			

== Washington ==
1938 United States Senate election in Washington
- November 8, 1938
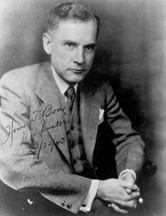

Nominee	Homer Bone	Ewing D. Colvin
Party	Democratic	Republican
Popular vote	371,535	220,204
Percentage	62.62%	37.12%
- Results by county Bone: 50–60% 60–70% 70–80% Colvin: 50–60%
U.S. senator before election
Homer Bone
Democratic
Elected U.S. Senator
Homer Bone
Democratic

Washington election
Party	Candidate	Votes	%
Democratic	Homer Bone (Incumbent)	371,535	62.62%
Republican	Ewing D. Colvin	220,204	37.12%
Socialist Labor	Eugene Solie	1,553	0.26%
Majority		151,331	25.50%
Turnout		593,292	
Democratic hold			

== Wisconsin ==
1938 United States Senate election in Wisconsin
- November 8, 1938
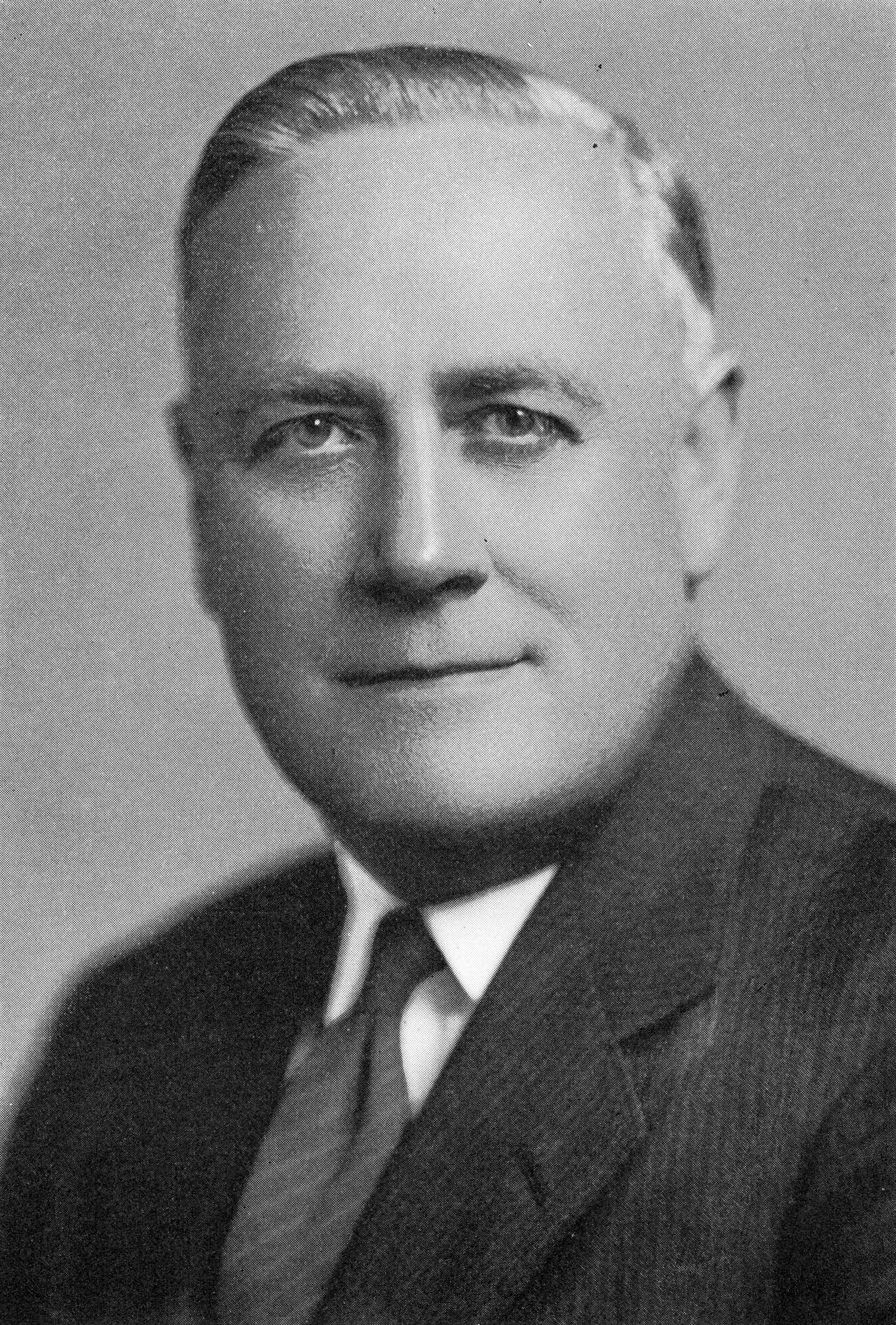

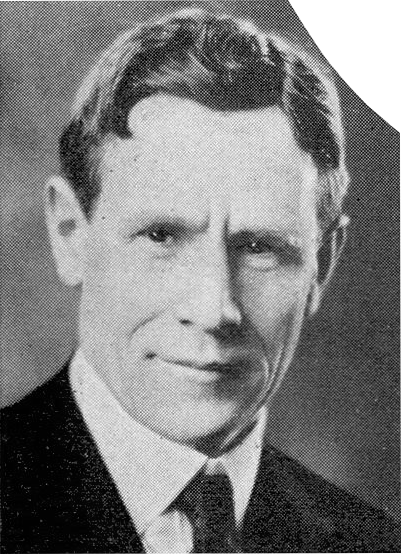

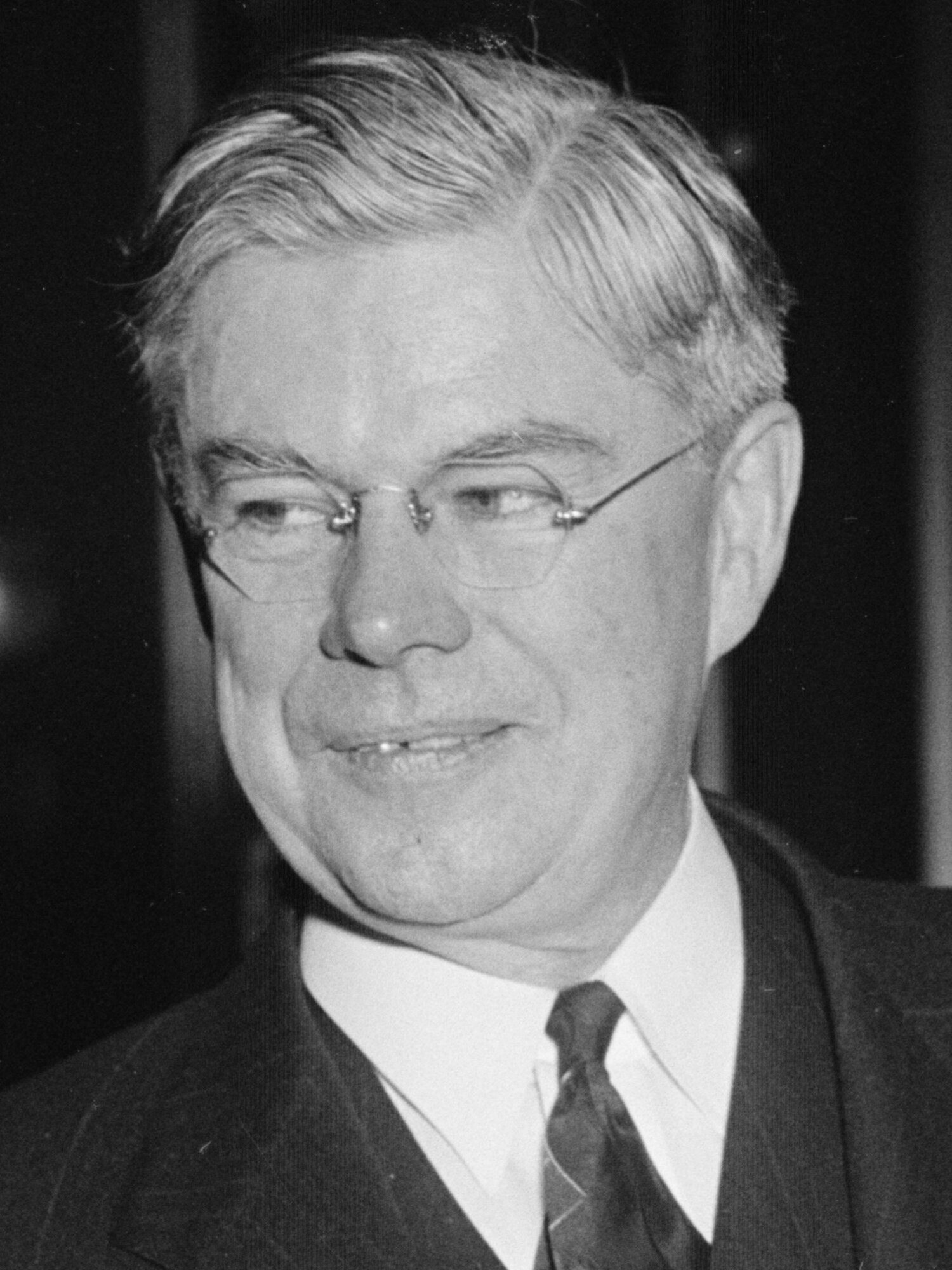
Nominee	Alexander Wiley	Herman L. Ekern	F. Ryan Duffy
Party	Republican	National Progressives of America	Democratic
Popular vote	446,770	249,209	231,976
Percentage	47.66%	26.58%	24.74%
- County results Wiley: 30–40% 40–50% 50–60% 60–70% 70–80% Ekern: 40–50% Duffy: 30–40% 40–50%
U.S. senator before election
F. Ryan Duffy
Democratic
Elected U.S. Senator
Alexander Wiley
Republican

Wisconsin election
Party	Candidate	Votes	%
Republican	Alexander Wiley	416,770	45.92%
National Progressives of America	Herman Ekern	249,209	27.46%
Democratic	F. Ryan Duffy (Incumbent)	231,976	25.56%
Townsend	John B. Chapple	7,251	0.80%
Independent Communist	Fred Basset Blair	1,283	0.14%
Independent Socialist Labor Party (United States)	Joseph Erhardt	1,014	0.11%
None	Scattering	31	0.00%
Majority		167,561	18.46%
Turnout		907,534	
Republican gain from Democratic			

== See also ==
- 1938 United States elections
  - 1938 United States gubernatorial elections
  - 1938 United States House of Representatives elections
- 75th United States Congress
- 76th United States Congress
