= 1906–07 United States Senate elections =

- January 9, 1906 – August 6, 1907
- Class 2

30 of the 90 seats in the United States Senate (as well as special elections) 46 seats needed for a majority
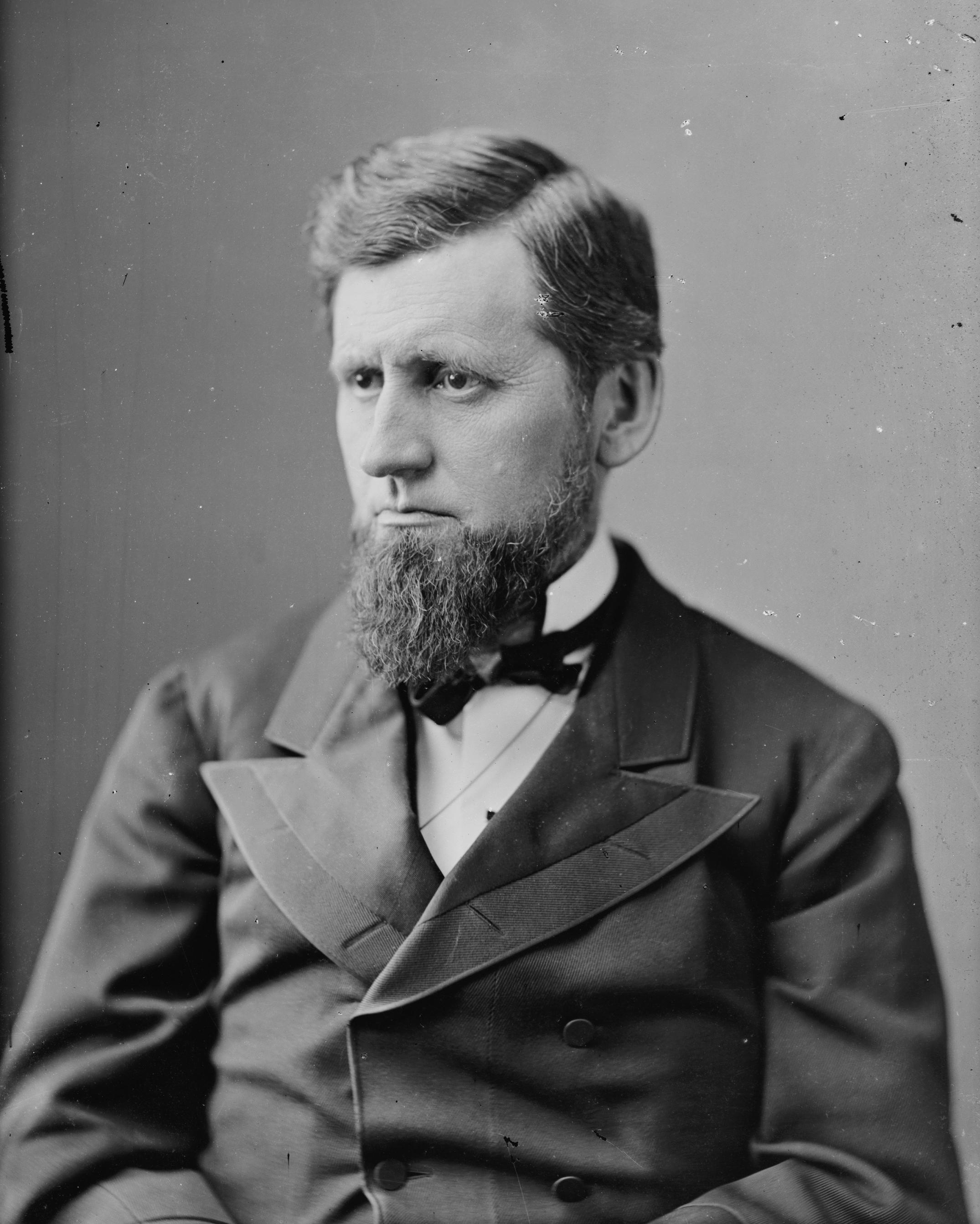

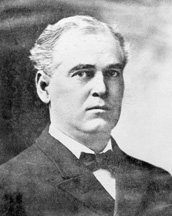
	Majority party	Minority party
Leader	William B. Allison (retired)	Charles Culberson
Party	Republican	Democratic
Leader since	March 4, 1897	March 4, 1905
Leader's seat	Iowa	Texas
Seats before	57	33
Seats won	18	11
Seats after	60	29
Seat change	▲3	▼4
Seats up	15	15
- Results of the elections: Democratic hold Republican gain Republican hold Legislature failed to elect
Majority Party before election
Republican
Elected Majority Party
Republican

The 1906–07 United States Senate elections were held on various dates in various states. As these U.S. Senate elections were prior to the ratification of the Seventeenth Amendment in 1913, senators were chosen by state legislatures. Senators were elected over a wide range of time throughout 1906 and 1907, and a seat may have been filled months late or remained vacant due to legislative deadlock. In these elections, terms were up for the senators in Class 2.

The Republican Party gained three seats in the United States Senate, expanding their majority to more than twice that of the opposing Democratic Party. The elections were held alongside the 1906 House of Representatives elections, which saw a significant Democratic gain in contrast to the Senate elections.

In Georgia, the legislature failed to elect until shortly after the beginning of the 60th Congress on March 4. In Rhode Island, the legislature deadlocked and did not elect a Senator until well into 1908.

== Results summary ==
Senate party division, 60th Congress (1907–1909)

- Majority party: Republican (60)
- Minority party: Democratic (28)
- Other prties: 0
- Vacancies: 2
- Total seats: 90

== Change in composition ==
=== Before the elections ===
At the beginning of 1906.

					D_{1}	D_{2}	D_{3}	D_{4}	D_{5}
D_{15}	D_{14}	D_{13}	D_{12}	D_{11}	D_{10}	D_{9}	D_{8}	D_{7}	D_{6}
D_{16}	D_{17}	D_{18}	D_{19} Al. Ran	D_{20} Ar. Ran	D_{21} Co. Retired	D_{22} Ga. Ran	D_{23} Id. Ran	D_{24} Ky. Ran	D_{25} La. Ran
R_{56} W.V. Ran	R_{57} Wyo. Ran	D_{33} Va. Ran	D_{32} Tex. Ran	D_{31} Tenn. Ran	D_{30} S.C. Ran	D_{29} Or. Retired	D_{28} N.C. Ran	D_{27} Mont. Retired	D_{26} Miss. Ran
R_{55} S.D. Ran	R_{54} R.I. Ran	R_{53} N.J. Ran	R_{52} N.H. Ran	R_{51} Neb. Retired	R_{50} Minn. Ran	R_{49} Mich. Retired	R_{48} Mass. Ran	R_{47} Me. Ran	R_{46} Kan. Ran
Majority →									R_{46} Kan. Ran
R_{36}	R_{37}	R_{38}	R_{39}	R_{40}	R_{41}	R_{42}	R_{43} Del. Retired	R_{44} Ill. Ran	R_{45} Ia. Ran
R_{35}	R_{34}	R_{33}	R_{32}	R_{31}	R_{30}	R_{29}	R_{28}	R_{27}	R_{26}
R_{16}	R_{17}	R_{18}	R_{19}	R_{20}	R_{21}	R_{22}	R_{23}	R_{24}	R_{25}
R_{15}	R_{14}	R_{13}	R_{12}	R_{11}	R_{10}	R_{9}	R_{8}	R_{7}	R_{6}
					R_{1}	R_{2}	R_{3}	R_{4}	R_{5}

=== Result of the general elections ===
					D_{1}	D_{2}	D_{3}	D_{4}	D_{5}
D_{15}	D_{14}	D_{13}	D_{12}	D_{11}	D_{10}	D_{9}	D_{8}	D_{7}	D_{6}
D_{16}	D_{17}	D_{18}	D_{19} Re-elected	D_{20} Re-elected	D_{21} Re-elected	D_{22} Re-elected	D_{23} Re-elected	D_{24} Re-elected	D_{25} Re-elected
R_{56} Hold	R_{57} Gain	R_{58} Gain	R_{59} Gain	R_{60} Gain	V_{1} R.I. R Loss	V_{2} Ga. D Loss	D_{28} Hold	D_{27} Hold	D_{26} Hold
R_{55} Hold	R_{54} Hold	R_{53} Hold	R_{52} Hold	R_{51} Re-elected	R_{50} Re-elected	R_{49} Re-elected	R_{48} Re-elected	R_{47} Re-elected	R_{46} Re-elected
Majority→									R_{45} Re-elected
R_{36}	R_{37}	R_{38}	R_{39}	R_{40}	R_{41}	R_{42}	R_{43} Re-elected	R_{44} Re-elected	R_{45} Re-elected
R_{35}	R_{34}	R_{33}	R_{32}	R_{31}	R_{30}	R_{29}	R_{28}	R_{27}	R_{26}
R_{16}	R_{17}	R_{18}	R_{19}	R_{20}	R_{21}	R_{22}	R_{23}	R_{24}	R_{25}
R_{15}	R_{14}	R_{13}	R_{12}	R_{11}	R_{10}	R_{9}	R_{8}	R_{7}	R_{6}
					R_{1}	R_{2}	R_{3}	R_{4}	R_{5}

=== Beginning of the next Congress ===
					D_{1}	D_{2}	D_{3}	D_{4}	D_{5}
D_{15}	D_{14}	D_{13}	D_{12}	D_{11}	D_{10}	D_{9}	D_{8}	D_{7}	D_{6}
D_{16}	D_{17}	D_{18}	D_{19}	D_{20}	D_{21}	D_{22}	D_{23}	D_{24}	D_{25}
R_{56}	R_{57}	R_{58}	R_{59}	R_{60}	V_{1} R.I.	D_{29} Ga. Appointed	D_{28}	D_{27}	D_{26}
R_{55}	R_{54}	R_{53}	R_{52}	R_{51}	R_{50}	R_{49}	R_{48}	R_{47}	R_{46}
Majority→									R_{45}
R_{36}	R_{37}	R_{38}	R_{39}	R_{40}	R_{41}	R_{42}	R_{43}	R_{44}	R_{45}
R_{35}	R_{34}	R_{33}	R_{32}	R_{31}	R_{30}	R_{29}	R_{28}	R_{27}	R_{26}
R_{16}	R_{17}	R_{18}	R_{19}	R_{20}	R_{21}	R_{22}	R_{23}	R_{24}	R_{25}
R_{15}	R_{14}	R_{13}	R_{12}	R_{11}	R_{10}	R_{9}	R_{8}	R_{7}	R_{6}
					R_{1}	R_{2}	R_{3}	R_{4}	R_{5}

Key

D_{#}	Democratic
R_{#}	Republican
V_{#}	Vacant

== Race summaries ==
=== Elections during the 59th Congress ===
In these elections, the winners were seated during 1906 or in 1907 before March 4; ordered by election date.

State	Incumbent			Results	Candidates
State	Senator	Party	Electoral history	Results	Candidates
Delaware (Class 1)	Vacant			Legislature had previously failed to elect. New senator elected June 12, 1906. Republican gain.	▌ ✓ Henry A. du Pont (Republican) 36; ▌J. Edward Addicks (Republican) 2
Kansas (Class 2)	Alfred W. Benson	Republican	1906 (appointed)	Interim appointee lost election. New senator elected January 22, 1907. Republican hold. Winner was also elected to the next term; see below.	▌ ✓ Charles Curtis (Republican) 120; ▌Alfred W. Benson (Republican) 19; ▌W. A. Harris (Democratic) 11; ▌Walter R. Stubbs (Republican) 1
Oregon (Class 2)	John M. Gearin	Democratic	1905 (appointed)	Interim appointee retired January 22, 1907, when successor elected. New senator elected January 22, 1907, ratifying popular selection made in 1906 state elections. Republican gain. Winner was not elected to the next term; see below.	▌ ✓ Frederick W. Mulkey (Republican); Unopposed In state election: ▌Frederick W. Mulkey (Republican) 74.85%; ▌J. D. Stevens (Socialist) 15.17%; ▌Hiram Gould (Prohibition) 9.99%
Michigan (Class 2)	Russell A. Alger	Republican	1902 (appointed); 1903 (special)	Incumbent died January 24, 1907. New senator elected February 5, 1907. Republican hold. Winner had already been elected to the next term; see below.	▌ ✓ William A. Smith (Republican); [data missing]

In this election, the winner was seated March 4, 1909, in the 61st Congress.

State	Incumbent			Results	Candidates
State	Senator	Party	Electoral history	Results	Candidates
Alabama (Class 3)	Edmund Pettus	Democratic	1903	Incumbent re-elected early January 22, 1907, for the term beginning March 4, 1909. Winner died July 27, 1907, and a new senator was elected early August 6, 1907.	July 27, 1907: ▌ ✓ Edmund Pettus (Democratic); Unopposed; August 6, 1907: ▌ ✓ Joseph F. Johnston (Democratic); Unopposed

=== Elections leading to the 60th Congress ===
In these regular elections, the winners were elected for the term beginning March 4, 1907; ordered by state.

All of the elections involved the Class 2 seats.

State	Incumbent			Results	Candidates
State	Senator	Party	Electoral history	Results	Candidates
Alabama	John T. Morgan	Democratic	1876; 1882; 1888; 1894; 1900	Incumbent re-elected January 22, 1907. Winner died June 11, 1907, and a new senator was appointed June 17. Interim appointee elected July 16, 1907.	January 22, 1907: ▌ ✓ John T. Morgan (Democratic); Unopposed; July 16, 1907: ▌ ✓ John H. Bankhead (Democratic); Unopposed
Arkansas	James H. Berry	Democratic	1885 (special); 1889; 1895; 1901	Incumbent lost re-election. Winner elected January 29, 1907. Democratic hold.	▌ ✓ Jeff Davis (Democratic); ▌John L. Worthington (Republican) 5
Colorado	Thomas Patterson	Democratic	1901	Incumbent retired. New senator elected January 16, 1907. Republican gain.	▌ ✓ Simon Guggenheim (Republican) 68; ▌Charles Thomas (Democratic) 27; ▌Frank C. Goudy (Republican) 4
Delaware	J. Frank Allee	Republican	1903 (special)	Incumbent retired. New senator elected January 16, 1907. Republican hold.	▌ ✓ Harry A. Richardson (Republican) 36; ▌Willard Saulsbury Jr. (Democratic) 15
Georgia	Augustus O. Bacon	Democratic	1894; 1900	Incumbent ran, but legislature failed to elect. Democratic loss. Incumbent was appointed to start the term and was later elected to finish the term; see below.	▌Augustus O. Bacon (Democratic) [data missing]
Idaho	Fred Dubois	Democratic	1890; 1897 (lost); 1901	Incumbent lost re-election. New senator elected January 15, 1907. Republican gain.	▌ ✓ William Borah (Republican) 50; ▌Fred Dubois (Democratic) 18
Illinois	Shelby M. Cullom	Republican	1882; 1888; 1894; 1901	Incumbent re-elected January 22, 1907.	▌ ✓ Shelby M. Cullom (Republican) 132; ▌Carroll C. Boggs (Democratic) 68; ▌Daniel R. Sheen (Prohibition) 3
Iowa	Jonathan Dolliver	Republican	1900 (appointed); 1901 (appointed); 1902 (special)	Incumbent re-elected January 23, 1907.	▌ ✓ Jonathan Dolliver (Republican) 110; ▌Claude Porter (Democratic) 45
Kansas	Alfred W. Benson	Republican	1906 (appointed)	Interim appointee lost election. New senator elected January 22, 1907. Republican hold. Winner was also elected to finish the term; see above.	▌ ✓ Charles Curtis (Republican) 122; ▌William A. Harris (Democratic) 32; ▌Joseph L. Bristow (Republican) 1
Kentucky	J. C. S. Blackburn	Democratic	1884; 1890; 1897 (lost); 1900	Incumbent lost renomination. New senator elected January 16, 1906, after an election on January 9, 1906. Democratic hold.	▌ ✓ Thomas Paynter (Democratic) 79; ▌William Cox (Republican) 27; ▌Curtis F. Burnam (Republican) 1
Louisiana	Murphy J. Foster	Democratic	1900	Incumbent re-elected early May 18, 1904.	▌ ✓ Murphy J. Foster (Democratic) 148; Unopposed
Maine	William P. Frye	Republican	1881 (special); 1883; 1889; 1895; 1901	Incumbent re-elected January 15, 1907.	▌ ✓ William P. Frye (Republican) 109; ▌William H. Pennell (Democratic) 66
Massachusetts	Winthrop Crane	Republican	1904 (appointed); 1905 (special)	Incumbent re-elected January 15, 1907.	▌ ✓ Winthrop M. Crane (Republican) 207; ▌James B. Carroll (Democratic) 48; ▌George Williams (Democratic) 3; ▌Joseph H. O'Neil (Democratic) 1; ▌John A. Sullivan (Democratic) 1
Michigan	Russell A. Alger	Republican	1902 (appointed); 1903 (special)	Incumbent retired. New senator elected January 15, 1907. Republican hold. Winner was subsequently elected to finish the current term; see above.	▌ ✓ William A. Smith (Republican) 123; ▌Charles E. Townsend (Republican) 2; ▌T. E. Barkworth (Democratic) 2
Minnesota	Knute Nelson	Republican	1895; 1901	Incumbent re-elected January 22, 1907.	▌ ✓ Knute Nelson (Republican) 143; ▌Albert Schaller (Democratic) 27; ▌W. J. Dean (Progressive) 3; ▌John O. Johnson (Democratic) 1; ▌Frank A. Day (Democratic) 1
Mississippi	Anselm J. McLaurin	Democratic	1894 (special); 1900	Incumbent re-elected early January 19, 1904.	▌ ✓ Anselm J. McLaurin (Democratic); [data missing]
Montana	William Clark	Democratic	1899; 1900 (resigned); 1901	Incumbent retired. New senator elected January 16, 1907. Republican gain.	▌ ✓ Joseph M. Dixon (Republican) 70; ▌Joseph Toole (Democratic) 17; ▌H. L. Frank (Democratic) 6; ▌W. C. Conrad (Unknown) 2; ▌[FNU] Norris (Democratic) 1
Nebraska	Joseph Millard	Republican	1901 (special)	Incumbent retired. New senator elected January 15, 1907. Republican hold.	▌ ✓ Norris Brown (Republican) 95; ▌William H. Thompson (Democratic) 36
New Hampshire	Henry E. Burnham	Republican	1901	Incumbent re-elected January 15, 1907.	▌ ✓ Henry E. Burnham (Republican) 254; ▌Nathan C. Jameson (Democratic) 123; ▌George B. Leighton (Unknown) 1
New Jersey	John F. Dryden	Republican	1902 (special)	Incumbent withdrew from renomination. New senator elected February 5, 1907. Republican hold.	▌ ✓ Frank O. Briggs (Republican) 41; ▌James E. Martine (Democratic) 35; ▌John W. Griggs (Republican) 1; ▌Mahlon Pitney (Republican) 1
North Carolina	F. M. Simmons	Democratic	1901	Incumbent re-elected January 22, 1907.	▌ ✓ F. M. Simmons (Democratic) 116; ▌Spencer B. Adams (Republican) 3; ▌James J. Britt (Republican) 2
Oregon	John M. Gearin	Democratic	1905 (appointed)	Interim appointee retired. New senator elected January 2, 1907, ratifying popular selection made in 1906 state elections. Republican gain.	▌ ✓ Jonathan Bourne Jr. (Republican) 80; ▌Robert S. Bean (Democratic) 4; ▌Frank A. Moore (Democratic) 2; ▌Frederick W. Mulkey (Republican) 1 In state election: ▌Jonathan Bourne Jr. (Republican) 46.25%; ▌Robert S. Bean (Democratic) 42.86%; ▌A. G. Simola (Socialist) 6.10%; ▌B. Lee Paget (Prohibition) 4.80%
Rhode Island	George P. Wetmore	Republican	1894; 1900	Legislature failed to elect. Republican loss.	▌George P. Wetmore (Republican); ▌Samuel P. Colt (Republican); ▌Robert H. I. Goddard (Democratic)
South Carolina	Benjamin Tillman	Democratic	1894; 1901	Incumbent re-elected January 22, 1907.	▌ ✓ Benjamin Tillman (Democratic); Unopposed
South Dakota	Robert J. Gamble	Republican	1901	Incumbent re-elected January 22, 1907.	▌ ✓ Robert J. Gamble (Republican) 100; ▌Andrew E. Lee (Democratic) 17; ▌Thomas Sterling (Independent) 15
Tennessee	Edward W. Carmack	Democratic	1901	Incumbent lost renomination. New senator elected January 15, 1907. Democratic hold.	▌ ✓ Robert L. Taylor (Democratic) 108; ▌Nathan W. Hale (Republican) 26; ▌Asbury Wright (Republican) 1
Texas	Joseph W. Bailey	Democratic	1901	Incumbent re-elected January 22, 1907.	▌ ✓ Joseph W. Bailey (Democratic) 108; ▌William L. Cabell (Democratic) 2; ▌Alexander W. Terrell (Democratic) 1; ▌Horace Chilton (Democratic) 1; ▌Thomas M. Campbell (Democratic) 3; ▌John W. Logan (Democratic) 2; ▌James E. Yantis (Democratic) 2; ▌Cecil A. Lyon (Republican) 2; ▌Other Democrats 25
Virginia	Thomas S. Martin	Democratic	1893 (early); 1899 (early)	Incumbent re-elected January 24, 1906.	▌ ✓ Thomas S. Martin (Democratic) 116; ▌Campbell Slemp (Republican) 17
West Virginia	Stephen B. Elkins	Republican	1895; 1901	Incumbent re-elected January 22, 1907.	▌ ✓ Stephen B. Elkins (Republican) 101; ▌John J. Cornwell (Democratic) 30
Wyoming	Francis E. Warren	Republican	1890; 1893 (lost); 1895; 1901	Incumbent re-elected January 22, 1907.	▌ ✓ Francis E. Warren (Republican) 64; ▌Colin Hunter (Democratic) 6

=== Elections during the 60th Congress ===
In these elections, the winners were elected in 1907 after March 4; sorted by election date.

State	Incumbent			Results	Candidates
State	Senator	Party	Electoral history	Results	Candidates
Wisconsin (Class 3)	John C. Spooner	Republican	1897; 1903	Incumbent resigned April 30, 1907. New senator elected May 17, 1907. Republican hold.	▌ ✓ Isaac Stephenson (Republican) 81.31%; ▌George W. Bird (Democratic) 14.95%; ▌Jacob Rummel (Social Democratic) 3.74%
Georgia (Class 2)	Augustus O. Bacon	Democratic	1894; 1900; 1907 (appointed)	Interim appointee elected July 9, 1907.	▌ ✓ Augustus O. Bacon (Democratic); Unopposed
Alabama (Class 2)	John H. Bankhead	Democratic	1907 (appointed)	John T. Morgan (D), having just been re-elected (see above), died June 11, 1907. Interim appointee elected July 16, 1907.	▌ ✓ John H. Bankhead (Democratic); Unopposed
Alabama (Class 3)	Edmund Pettus	Democratic	1903; 1907	Incumbent, having just been re-elected, died July 27, 1907. New senator elected August 6, 1907. Democratic hold.	▌ ✓ Joseph F. Johnston (Democratic); Unopposed
Alabama (Class 3)	Edmund Pettus	Democratic	1903; 1907	New senator was also elected early August 6, 1907, to the term beginning March 4, 1909.	▌ ✓ Joseph F. Johnston (Democratic); Unopposed
Oklahoma (Class 2)	None (new state)			First senators elected December 10, 1907. Democratic gain.	▌ ✓ Robert L. Owen (Democratic) 128 votes; ▌Clarence B. Douglas (Republican) 22 votes; ▌C. B. Jones (Republican) 22 votes
Oklahoma (Class 3)	None (new state)			First senators elected December 10, 1907. Democratic gain.	▌ ✓ Thomas Gore (Democratic) 128 votes; ▌Clarence B. Douglas (Republican) 22 votes; ▌C. B. Jones (Republican) 22 votes

== Alabama ==
The two new senators, John H. Bankhead and Joseph F. Johnston, were named "alternate" senators at the state Democratic primary in 1906. The men who would beat them both died so Bankhead and Johnston were elected in their places.

=== Class 2 ===
Alabama's class 2 senators

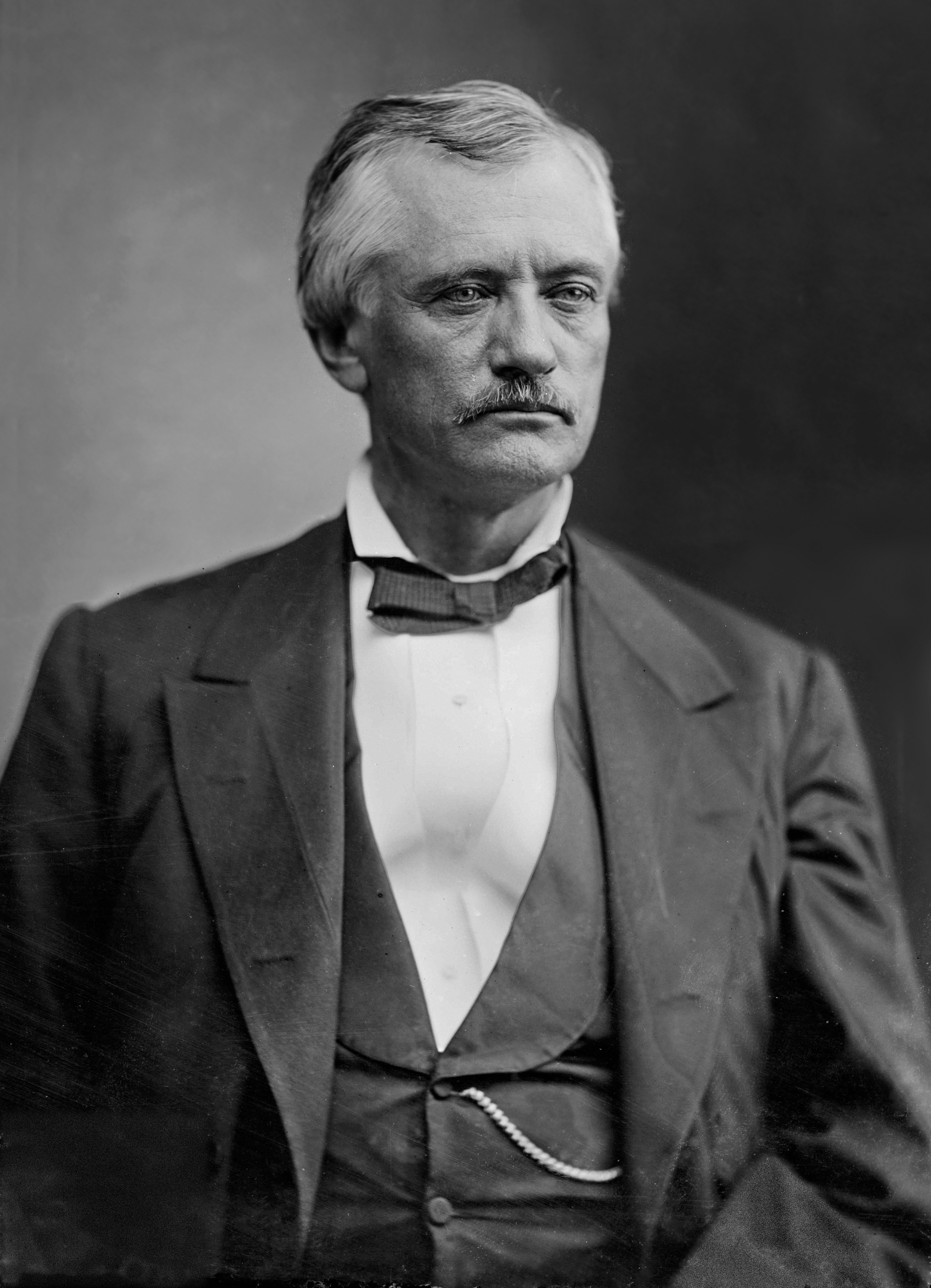
John Tyler Morgan,
until June 11, 1907

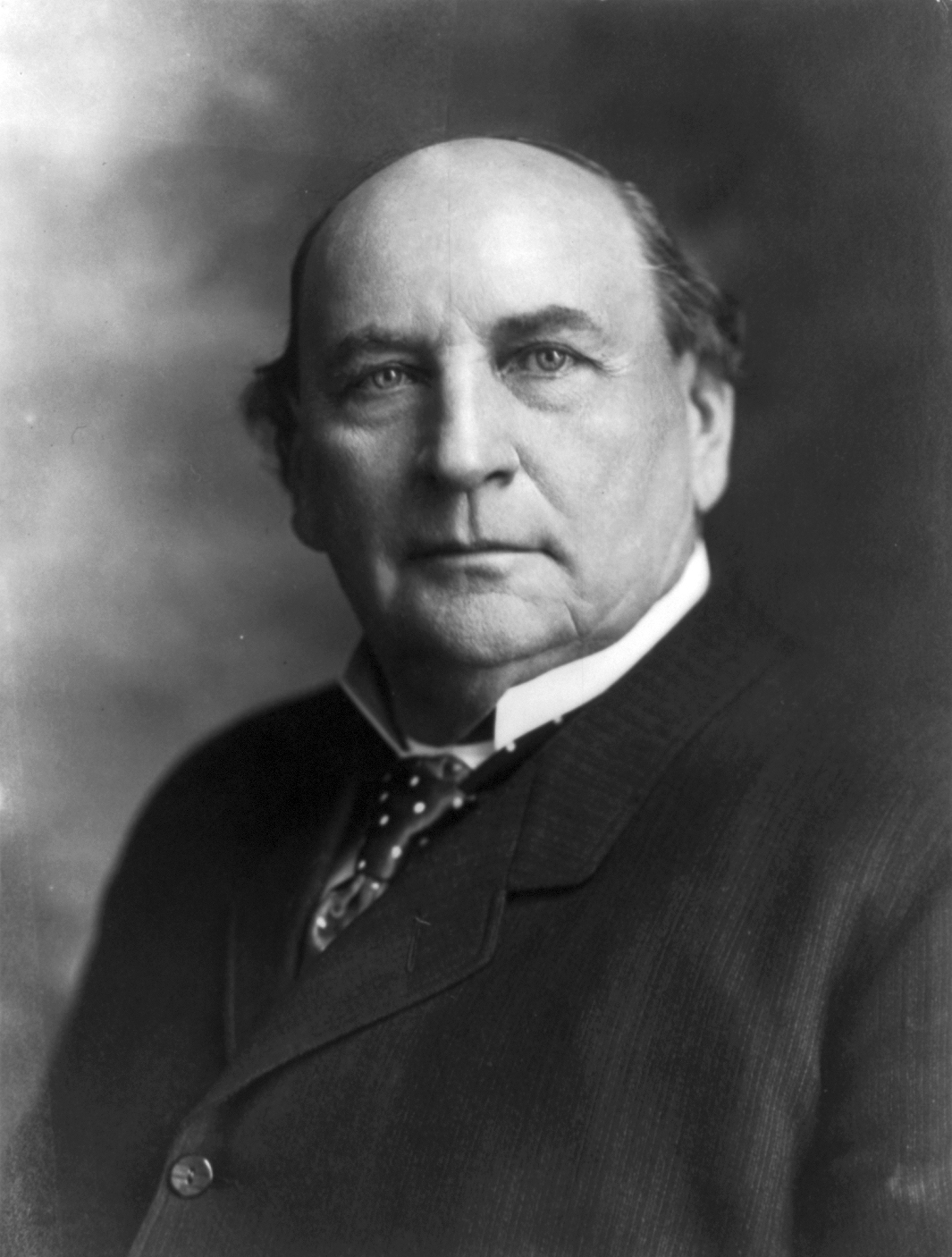
John H. Bankhead, from June 18, 1907

==== Alabama (regular, class 2) ====
Five-term Democrat John Tyler Morgan was re-elected January 22, 1907.

==== Alabama (special, class 2) ====
Morgan died June 11, 1907, just three months into his sixth term. Democrat John H. Bankhead was appointed June 18, 1907, to continue the term, pending a July 16, 1907, special election, which he won.

=== Class 3 ===
Alabama's class 3 senators

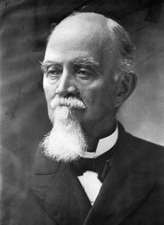
Edmund Pettus,
until July 27, 1907

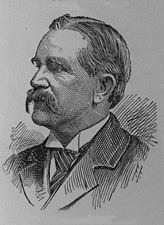
Joseph F. Johnston, from August 6, 1907

==== Alabama (regular, class 3) ====
Two-term Democrat Edmund Pettus was re-elected early on January 22, 1907, for the term that would begin in 1909.

==== Alabama (special, class 3) ====
Pettus died July 27, 1907, even before his new term was supposed to begin. Democrat Joseph F. Johnston was elected August 6, 1907, both to finish the term and to the next term.

== Oregon ==
=== Oregon (special) ===
1906 United States Senate special election in Oregon
- January 22, 1907
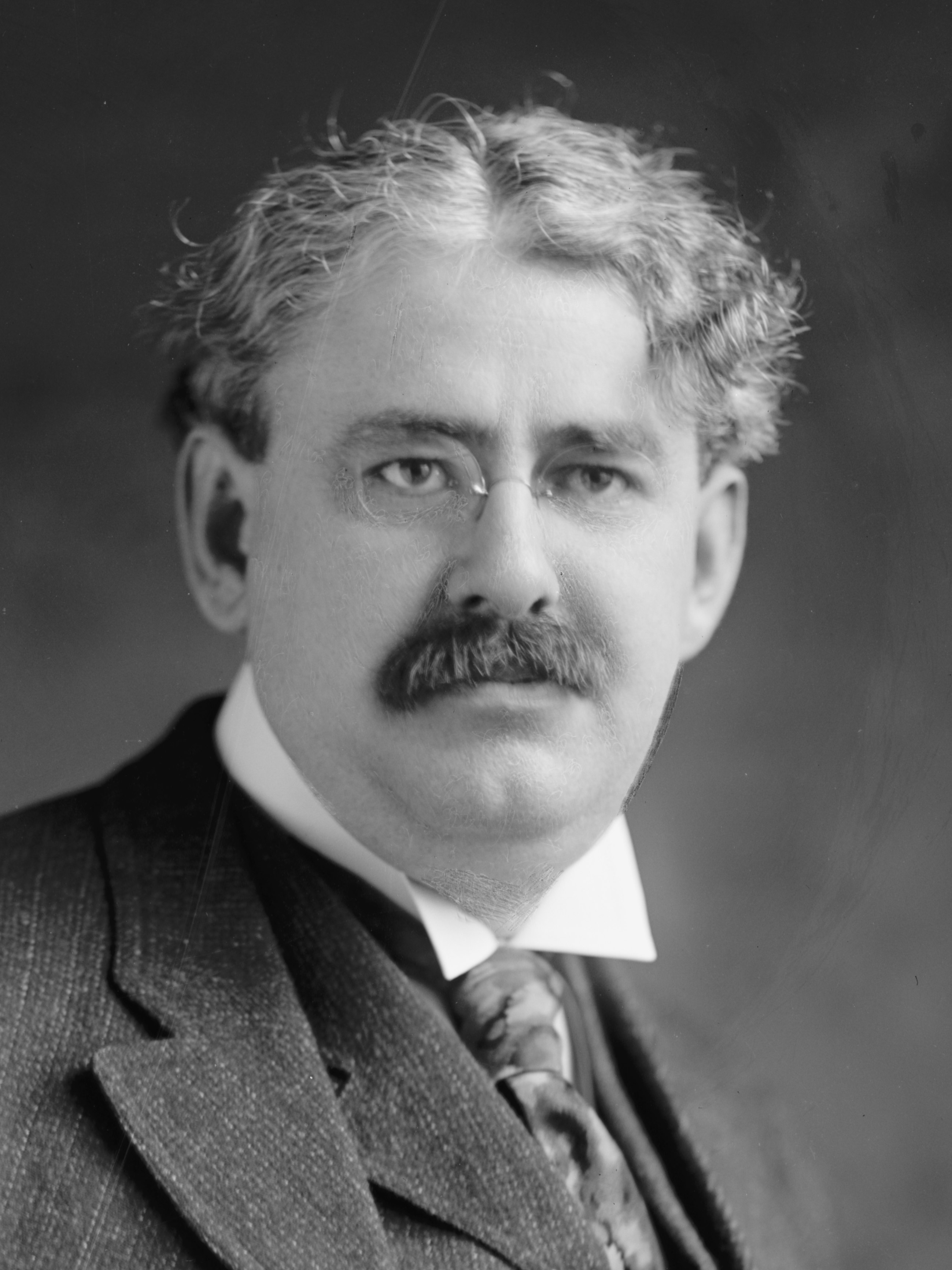

Nominee	Frederick W. Mulkey	J. D. Stevens	Hiram Gould
Party	Republican	Socialist	Prohibition
Popular vote	61,615	12,485	8,224
Percentage	74.85%	15.17%	9.99%
- County results Mulkey: 60–70% 70–80% 80–90%
U.S. senator before election
John M. Gearin
Democratic
Elected U.S. Senator
Frederick W. Mulkey
Republican

John M. Gearin was appointed by Governor George E. Chamberlain to fill Oregon's class 2 seat following the death of John H. Mitchell in 1905. This special election determined who would complete this term which expired March 4, 1907. Under the 1904 direct primary law, this and the regular senate election were the first to be determined by popular vote.

Gearin ran and lost in Oregon's regular senate election held at the same time. Without Democratic opposition, Mulkey won the popular vote on November 6, 1906, in a landslide. The Oregon Legislative Assembly unanimously elected Mulkey on January 22, 1907, and he took office the next day. He was succeeded by Jonathan Bourne Jr. who won the regular election.

== See also ==
- 1906 United States elections
  - 1906 United States House of Representatives elections
- 59th United States Congress
- 60th United States Congress
