= Joseph Simon (politician) =

American politician (1851–1935)

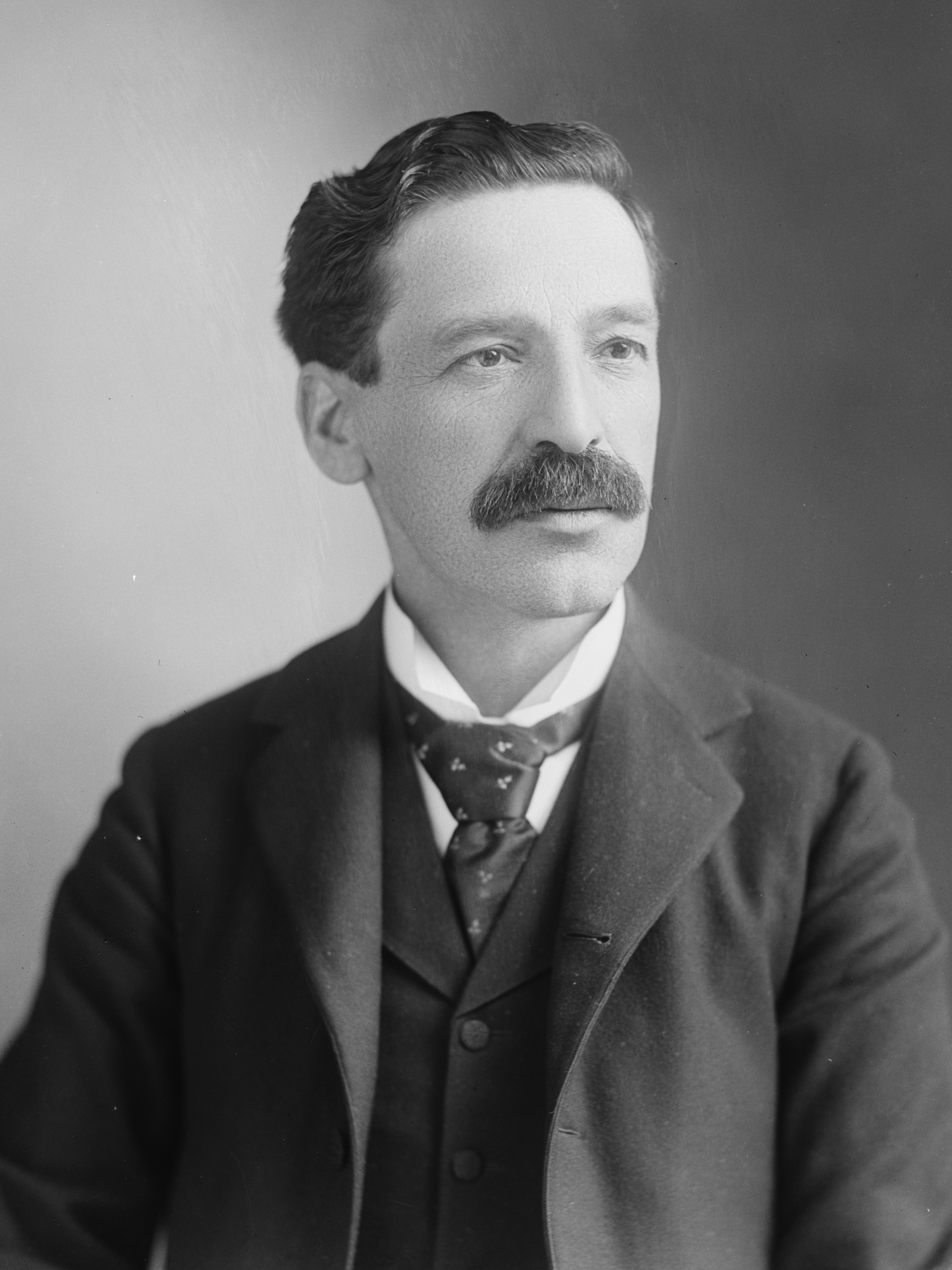
- Simon c. 1894–1901

United States Senator from Oregon
- In office October 8, 1898 – March 3, 1903
- Preceded by: John H. Mitchell
- Succeeded by: Charles William Fulton

President of the Oregon State Senate
- In office 1889–1892; 1895–1898
- Preceded by: John C. Carson; Charles W. Fulton
- Succeeded by: Charles W. Fulton; T. C. Taylor

Member of the Oregon State Senate
- In office 1880–1898
- Constituency: Multnomah County

36th Mayor of Portland, Oregon
- In office 1909–1911
- Preceded by: Harry Lane
- Succeeded by: Allen G. Rushlight

Personal details
- Born: February 7, 1851 Bechtheim, Grand Duchy of Hesse, German Confederation
- Died: February 14, 1935 (aged 84) Portland, Oregon, U.S.
- Party: Republican
- Profession: Attorney

Joseph Simon (February 7, 1851 – February 14, 1935) was a German-born politician and attorney in the U.S. state of Oregon. He was born in Bechtheim, Hesse, and his family immigrated to the United States when he was one year old, settling in Portland, Oregon. A Republican, Simon served on the city council before election to the Oregon State Senate. He was later elected to the United States Senate for one partial term, 1898 to 1903. He later served as mayor of Portland for one term, 1909 to 1911. He was also the first Jewish Republican senator.

== Early life ==
Joseph Simon was born in Bechtheim, today a part of Germany, on February 7, 1851, to David Simon (1819–1901) and Elise née Leopold (1829–1890). He immigrated to the United States in 1852 with his parents, and in 1857 the family settled in Portland, Oregon. In Portland, Simon attended the local Portland Public Schools before studying law. He read law at the Portland law firm owned by Joseph N. Dolph and John H. Mitchell, and passed the bar in 1872. After passing the bar he entered private legal practice at Mitchell and Dolph’s firm. In 1873, he formed a partnership with Dolph and Dolph's brother Cyrus.

== Political career ==
He entered politics as a member of the Portland City Council serving from 1877 to 1880. In 1880, he was elected to and served in the Oregon State Senate as a Republican. Simon represented Multnomah County in several districts during his tenure due to reapportionment, and served through the 1891 legislative session. During both the 1889 and 1891 sessions he served as the President of the Senate. Simon did not serve in the 1893 session, but returned to the state senate in 1895 and was again the President.

During this time he was a member of the Republican National Committee from 1892 to 1896. In 1897, Simon was again President of the Senate; the 19th Oregon Legislative Assembly, however, did not organize for its 1897 regular session (due to a dispute over leadership in the House), and no legislation was passed. Due to this inability, a special legislative session was held in 1898 where Simon served as President, and where he served for the final time in the Oregon Senate.

As the Oregon Legislative Assembly failed to fully organize in 1897, they did not elect a United States senator, and Simon was then elected during the 1898 session, replacing incumbent and former employer John H. Mitchell. Simon served from October 8, 1898, until the term expired on March 3, 1903, and did not seek re-election. While in the Senate, he was chairman of the Committee on Irrigation and Reclamation of Arid Lands during the Fifty-sixth and Fifty-seventh Congresses.

== Later years ==
After serving in Congress, Simon returned to Portland and the practice of law at the firm of Dolph, Mallory, Simon & Gearin. He held political office one final time, serving as Portland Mayor from 1909 to 1911. He was never married. Joseph Simon died on February 14, 1935, at the age of 84 in Portland, and was buried at Beth Israel Cemetery in that city.

== See also ==
- List of Jewish members of the United States Congress
- List of United States senators born outside the United States

U.S. Senate
Preceded by John H. Mitchell	U.S. senator (Class 3) from Oregon; 1898–1903; Served alongside: George W. McBride, John H. Mitchell	Succeeded by Charles W. Fulton
Preceded by Harry Lane	Mayor of Portland, Oregon; 1909–1911	Succeeded by Allen G. Rushlight
