= Cyrus A. Dolph =

American lawyer

Cyrus Abda Dolph
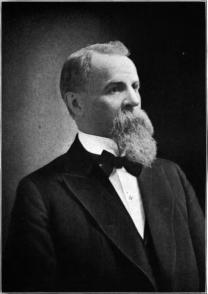
- Born: September 27, 1840
- Died: June 22, 1914 (aged 73)
- Occupation: Businessman

Cyrus Abda (C. A.) Dolph (September 27, 1840 – June 22, 1914) was a businessman in Portland, Oregon, United States. He was a promoter and counselor of various financial and railway enterprises of the Pacific Northwest of the United States.

He was born September 27, 1840, on a farm near Havana, Chemung, now Schuyler County, New York. He was called Abda in honor of one of his forefathers, Abda Dolph, who was born in Bolton, Massachusetts, in 1740, and served with distinction in the Revolutionary war, as did his brother Charles.

== Ancestry ==
The ancestry of the family can be traced back to the 17th century. Family history records that Balthazar De Wolf, who was born about 1620, resided for some years in Wethersfield, Connecticut, and in 1664 became a resident of Lyme, that state. He was married in 1645 and unto him and his wife, Alice, there were born six children, the eldest of whom was Edward De Wolf, who was born in 1646 and died in 1712, after having been a lifelong resident of Lyme. Unto Edward De Wolf and his wife, Rebecca, there were born four sons: Simon, in 1671; Charles, in 1673; Benjamin, in 1675; and Edward, Jr.

The line of descent is traced through the second son, Charles, who for many years resided in Middletown, Connecticut, where he died in 1731, his wife, Prudence, surviving him for ten years. Their son Joseph De Wolf, born in 1717, lost his life in the battle of Louisberg in 1757 while serving with the colonial army in the French and Indian war. Joseph De Wolf wedded Tabitha Johnson and their son Abda was also a soldier of the French and Indian war and, as previously stated, was numbered among the Revolutionary heroes, serving with Colonel Whiting's regiment of New York troops from Albany county. During the French and Indian war, he changed the orthography of the name from the French to the English form, adopting the present spelling of Dolph. He wedded Mary Coleman, a daughter of Nathaniel and Ruth Coleman, of New Haven, Connecticut. Their son Joseph was born in Fairfield, Connecticut, June 6, 1767, followed teaching and surveying and died December 21, 1827. His wife, who bore the maiden name of Elizabeth Norton, was born in 1772 and died in 1839. Her parents were Joseph and Martha Norton, the latter a daughter of Jabez and Elizabeth (Allen) Norton. Both Joseph and Martha Norton were descended from Nicholas Norton, of Weymouth, Massachusetts, (1636–60).

During much of his life he made his home at Edgartown, on Martha's Vineyard. It is said that of the thirteen hundred and fifty-six inhabitants of that place in 1790 one hundred and seventy-four of these were Nortons. The progenitor of the family, Nicholas Norton, had a son Benjamin, whose son Nicholas married Martha Daggett, and their son, Jabez Norton, was the father of Mrs. Elizabeth (Norton) Dolph. Little is known concerning the first Nicholas, except that he was born in 1610 and died in 1690, after having for years made his home at Weymouth and then at Edgartown.

Mention has been made of one of the Norton descendants, who married a member of the Daggett family. This family traced its lineage to John Daggett, of Weymouth, who died in 1642. By the marriage of John Daggett to Bathsheba Pratt, there was a son Thomas, who married Hannah Mayhew, and their son Joshua, married Hannah Norton, a daughter of Isaac and Ruth Norton. Joshua and Hannah Daggett had a daughter Martha, previously mentioned as the wife of Nicholas Norton.

Through the wife of Thomas Daggett the family is brought into relationship with the Mayhew family of colonial fame. The founder of this family in America, Thomas Mayhew, was born in England in March 1592. In 1641 he obtained a grant of Martha's Vineyard and the neighboring island and the next year settled at Edgartown, whose inhabitants were then Indians. With him came a few Englishmen and they in turn were joined by others from their native land. However, the population still consisted almost wholly of Indians.

During King Philip's War, when the natives became hostile and killed the foreign settlers all over New England, such was the influence of Thomas Mayhew over the red men of his island that they remained quiet and peaceful, though they might easily have killed the few white men had they so desired. After a long and honorable service as governor of the island, Thomas Mayhew died in March 1682. His son Thomas was a missionary to the Indians and so greatly beloved by them that even many years after he perished at sea in a shipwreck he was seldom named by them without tears. Other members of the family also became prominent, especially Experience (born 1637, died 1758), Zachariah (1717–1806) and Jonathan (1720–1766), the last named distinguished as a theologian and patriot.

The genealogy is traced from Joseph and Elizabeth (Norton) Dolph to their son, Chester V. Dolph, who was born at Whitehall, New York, on Lake Champlain, February 14, 1812, and died November 3, 1869. His wife was Elizabeth V. Steele (born 1813, died 1884), whose parents were William Steele (1785–1868) and Rachel Vanderbilt (1795–1883). William Steele was a son of John B. and Grace Seville (Brown) Steele. Rachel Vanderbilt was a daughter of Cornelius and Elizabeth (Rodman) Vanderbilt, her father being a member of one of the most noted pioneer families of Staten island, New York.

The four sons in the family of Chester V. Dolph were: Joseph N. Dolph, who later represented Oregon in the United States Senate; Cyrus A.; William V., who lived on the old homestead in New York; and John Mather, an educator at Port Jervis, New York.

== Early life ==
Dolph and his brothers were reared on the old home farm in what is now Schuyler County and there, like other members of the household, Cyrus assisted in the farm work and pursued his education in the village school. Three years, from 1859 to 1862, were devoted to teaching and in the latter year he and his brother Joseph enlisted in a company known as the Oregon Escort, which was formed in order to provide military protection to emigrants crossing the plains to Oregon, for in that year the Indians on the western plains took advantage of the disturbed condition of the country and constantly menaced the life and property of those who were journeying from the east to the Pacific coast. The brothers continued on military duty until they reached Walla Walla, Washington, where they were honorably discharged.

== Career ==
They then proceeded to Portland, and Cyrus in 1866 was admitted to the Oregon Bar, after which he engaged in the practice of law. Almost immediately he came to the front as a representative of the legal profession in Portland, a position which he maintained, being numbered among those who have conferred honor and dignity upon the legal profession and have brought to the Oregon bar a reputation which places it on a par with the bar in the older states of the east. In 1873, he co-founded the law firm of Dolph, Bronaugh, Dolph & Simon with his brother and with E. C. Bronaugh and Joseph Simon. In 1883, when Joseph Dolph left to take office as a newly elected U.S. Senator and Bronaugh retired, Cyrus Dolph became the senior member of the firm of Dolph, Bellinger, Mallory & Simon. Ten years later a change in the partnership led to the adoption of the firm style of Dolph, Mallory, Simon & Gearin, his associates being Rufus Mallory, Joseph Simon and John M. Gearin, all distinguished lawyers so that the partnership was one of marked legal talent and ability. Dolph was regarded as one of the foremost law counselors on the coast and specialized to a large extent in corporation and railroad law.

He was also an active factor in organizing and promoting business projects and enterprises which have been of far-reaching importance and benefit. He was active in the organization of the Portland Savings Bank and the Commercial National Bank, and for a number of years has occupied the presidency of the Northern Pacific Terminal Company of Oregon. He was financially interested in the Oregon Improvement Company and was general attorney for the Oregon and California Railroad Company in 1883 and 1884, while for a considerable period he served as one of its directors. He was also a director of the Oregon Railroad and Navigation Company from 1883 until 1889 and in the former year was chosen general attorney for that company and consulting attorney in Oregon for the Northern Pacific Railroad Company, being selected for the two positions by Henry Villard, who was president of the two companies. He was one of the organizers of the Security Savings & Trust Company and his name has long been inscribed high on the roll of the state's distinguished lawyers and financiers.

== Marriage and family ==
Dolph was married on June 24, 1874, to Miss Elise Cardinell, a native of Canada and a daughter of Charles Cardinell, who was of French Huguenot lineage. Mr. and Mrs. Dolph became parents of three sons and a daughter: Joseph N., Hazel Mills, William Vanderbilt and John Mather.

In the social circles of the city the family occupied a prominent position, and Dolph was active in many movements that have been of material benefit to Portland. The important lines of public progress and improvement receive not only his endorsement but also his cooperation. For many years he was a member of the water-works committee and president of the board of trustees of the Portland Library Association. Thomas Lamb Eliot was vice-president during some of that time. He was also a regent of the University of Oregon. He was allied with the Oregon Republican Party since age conferred upon him the right of franchise and undoubtedly could have attained to high political honors had not his ambitions and desires been centered and directed in other channels.

In June 1869 he was accorded the Republican nomination for city attorney and was elected by a large majority, serving for the regular term of two years. When he was absent from the city in 1874 the Republican convention nominated him for the state legislature, but at that time he declined to become a candidate as he did later when tendered the appointment of circuit judge of the Ninth Judicial Circuit, preferring to concentrate his time and energies upon his law practice and the cooperative interests with which he had become identified.

Dolph died June 22, 1914.
