= Frederick W. Mulkey =

American politician (1874–1924)

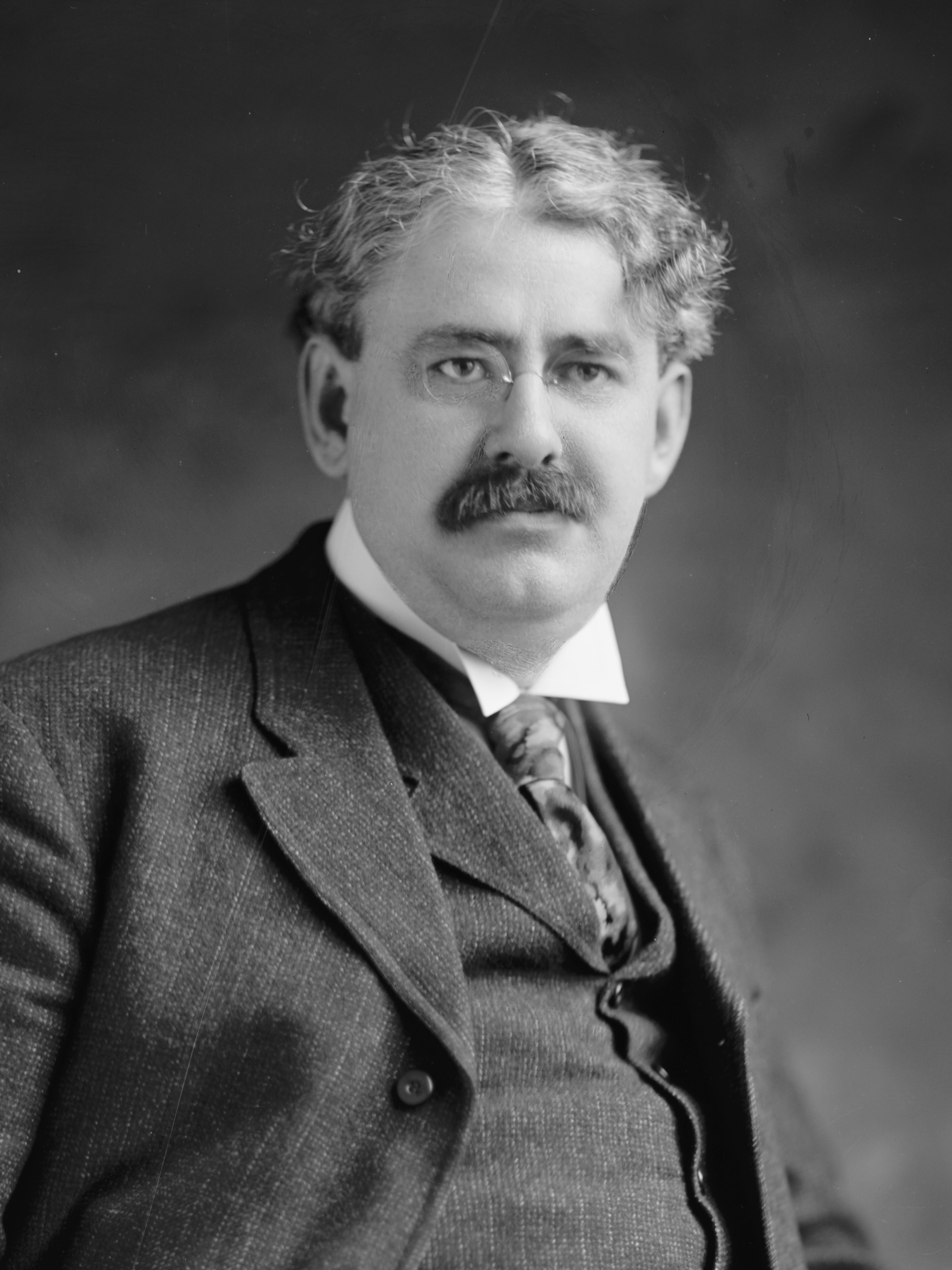

United States Senator from Oregon
- In office November 6, 1918 – December 17, 1918
- Preceded by: Charles L. McNary
- Succeeded by: Charles L. McNary
- In office January 23, 1907 – March 3, 1907
- Preceded by: John M. Gearin
- Succeeded by: Jonathan Bourne Jr.

Personal details
- Born: January 6, 1874 Portland, Oregon, U.S.
- Died: May 5, 1924 (aged 50) Portland, Oregon, U.S.
- Party: Republican
- Profession: Attorney

Frederick William Mulkey (January 6, 1874 – May 5, 1924) was an American attorney and politician from the state of Oregon. A native of Portland, he began his political career on the Portland City Council, serving one year as its president. A Republican, he twice served as a United States senator from Oregon, filling terms vacated by the deaths of the sitting senator. He served a total of 81 days in the office.

== Early life ==
On January 6, 1874, Frederick Mulkey was born in Portland, Oregon, to Mary E. (née Porter) and Marion Francis Mulkey. He was raised there and attended the Portland Public Schools before enrolling in the University of Oregon in Eugene in 1892. Mulkey graduated with a bachelor of laws degree from the school in 1896. He passed the Oregon bar in 1898 and entered private legal practice in Portland. In 1899, he received another law degree, this time from the New York Law School in New York City.

== Political career ==
In 1900, Mulkey joined the Portland City Council, serving until 1902, and was the president of the group in 1901. He was chairman of the Oregon State Tax Commission in 1905–1906. On November 6, 1906, Mulkey was elected as a Republican to the U.S. Senate to fill the vacancy caused by the death of John H. Mitchell, replacing appointee John M. Gearin. Mulkey was one of the first two senators to be elected under Oregon's direct primary law, in which senators were selected by popular vote, and then were officially elected to the position by the Oregon Legislative Assembly to comply with Article One of the U.S. Constitution. (In 1914, the 17th Amendment established direct election of senators.) He served from January 23, 1907, until March 4, 1907, and was not a candidate for re-election in 1907.

Mulkey left Congress and returned to Portland where he resumed the practice of law. From 1911 to 1916 he served as the chairman of the city's Public Docks.

On November 5, 1918, he was again elected to the U.S. Senate, this time to fill the unexpired term of Harry Lane, who had died on May 23, 1917. Mulkey replaced Charles L. McNary who had been appointed temporarily to the position, and who had won the election for a full-term in office starting in January 1919. Mulkey served the second time from November 6, 1918, until his resignation, effective December 17, 1918. Mulkey resigned early to allow McNary to take office early and gain a slight seniority edge over incoming freshman senators.

== Later life ==
Upon leaving the Senate for a second time, he resumed the practice of law at Portland. From 1921 to 1924 he was chairman of the Multnomah County Tax Supervising and Conservation Commission. Frederick William Mulkey died in Portland on May 5, 1924, and the age of 50. His interment was in River View Cemetery in that city. Joseph Norton Dolph, also a U.S. Senator from Oregon, was Frederick Mulkey's uncle.

== Legacy ==
The Portland Police named a 60 feet (18 m) harbor patrol craft after Mulkey.

Party political offices
Preceded by Ben Selling	Republican nominee for U.S. Senator from Oregon (Class 2); 1918	Succeeded by Charles L. McNary
U.S. Senate
Preceded by John M. Gearin	U.S. senator (Class 2) from Oregon; 1907; Served alongside: Charles W. Fulton	Succeeded by Jonathan Bourne, Jr.
Preceded by Charles L. McNary	U.S. Senator (Class 2) from Oregon; 1918	Succeeded by Charles L. McNary
