= Charles W. Fulton =

American politician (1853–1918)

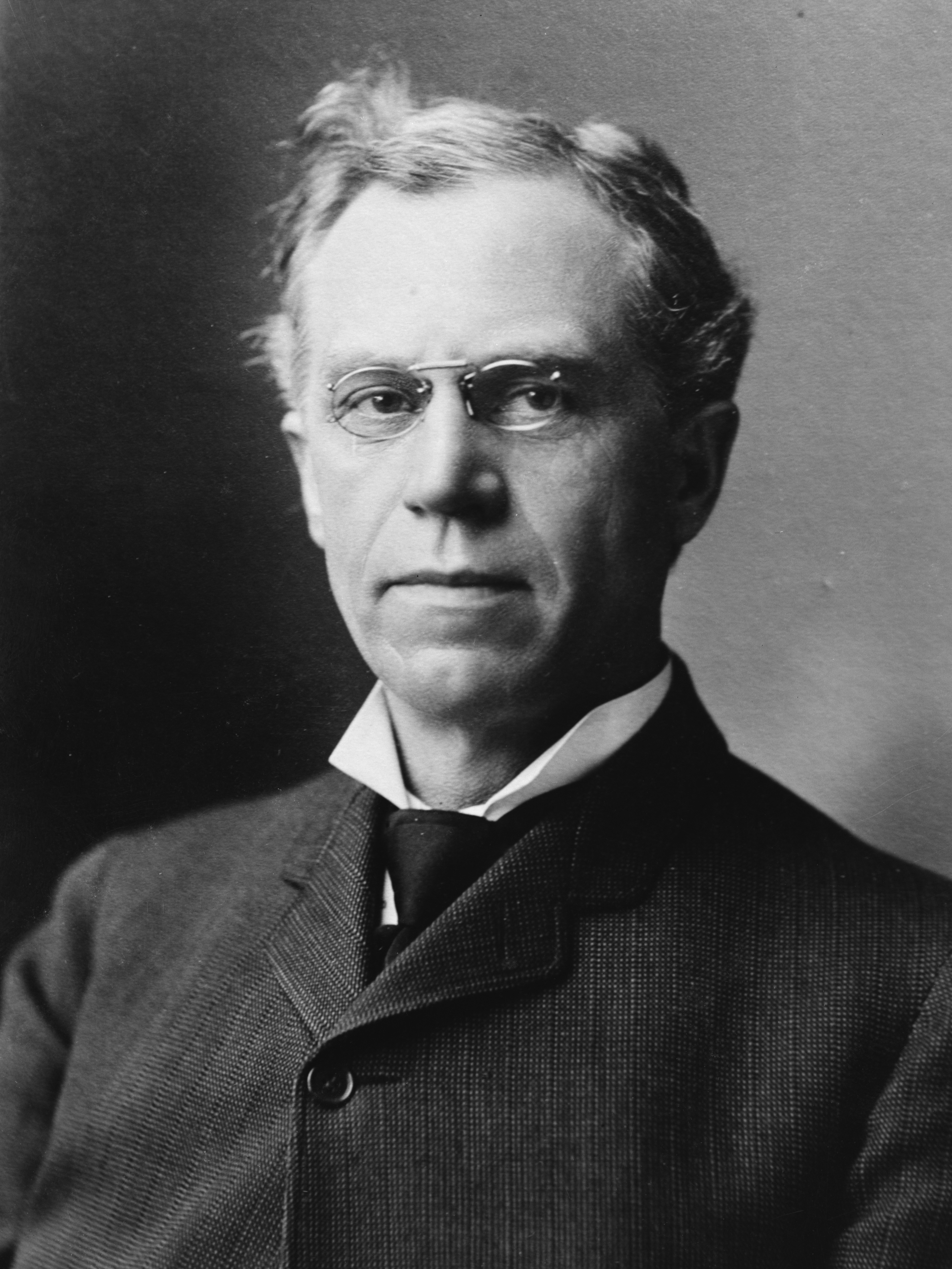
- Fulton c. 1901–1903

United States Senator from Oregon
- In office March 4, 1903 – March 3, 1909
- Preceded by: Joseph Simon
- Succeeded by: George Earle Chamberlain

President of the Oregon State Senate
- In office 1893–1894; 1901–1902
- Preceded by: Joseph Simon; T. C. Taylor
- Succeeded by: Joseph Simon; George C. Brownell

Oregon State Senator
- In office 1878–1881; 1891–1895; 1898–1903
- Constituency: Clatsop, Columbia, and Tillamook counties

Personal details
- Born: August 24, 1853 Lima, Ohio, U.S.
- Died: January 27, 1918 (aged 64) Portland, Oregon, U.S.
- Party: Republican
- Spouse: Ada M. Hobson
- Profession: Attorney

Charles William Fulton (August 24, 1853 – January 27, 1918) was an American lawyer and politician in the state of Oregon. A native of Ohio, he grew up in Iowa and Nebraska before settling in Astoria, Oregon. A Republican, he served in the Oregon State Senate, including time as President of the Senate, before he was elected as United States Senator from Oregon.

== Early life ==
Charles William Fulton was born in Lima, Ohio, on August 24, 1853, to Jacob and Eliza A. Fulton. The family moved to Iowa in 1855 and settled in Magnolia, Harrison County. Fulton attended the common schools there, and then moved to Pawnee City, Nebraska, in 1870 where he was educated at the Pawnee City Academy. He taught school while he studied law in Nebraska, and passed the bar in April 1875 in that state. Three days after passing the bar he departed for Oregon, arriving in Portland on April 20. Fulton then taught school for a few months to the south in Linn County at Waterloo. In July 1875, he relocated to Astoria at the mouth of the Columbia River where he entered private legal practice.

== Political career ==
In 1878, Fulton was elected to the Oregon State Senate to represent Clatsop, Columbia, and Tillamook counties as a Republican. He served his four-year term, remaining through the 1880 legislative session. In 1880, he began working as Astoria's city attorney, keeping the job until 1882. In 1890, he was elected to his old seat in the senate for a four-year term. During the 1893 session he served as President of the Senate.

In 1894, he was in contention for the Republican nomination for Oregon Governor, but William Paine Lord was selected as the candidate at the Republican convention. Fulton did not return to the senate during the next two legislatures, but was back during the 1898 special session. In 1900, he won another four-year term, and served as Senate President during the 1901 legislature.

He also served in the 1903 session before the Oregon Legislative Assembly elected him to the U.S. Senate. Fulton served in that office from March 4, 1903, to March 3, 1909. While in the Senate he was chairman, Committee on Canadian Relations (Fifty-eighth and Fifty-ninth Congresses) and a member of the Committee on Claims (Fifty-ninth and Sixtieth Congresses). He failed to win re-election in 1908, and served only a single term in the U.S. Senate.

In 1909 President Taft sought to appoint Fulton as U. S. ambassador to China, but following opposition from Chinese-Americans in Portland and San Francisco, Fulton declined the nomination.

== Later years and family ==
Following Congress, he resumed the practice of law in Portland. Fulton married in 1886 to Ada M. Hobson, and they had one child, a son. Elmer Lincoln Fulton, Charles' brother, was a United States representative from Oklahoma. Charles William Fulton died on January 27, 1918, at the age of 64 and was buried in Astoria at Ocean View Cemetery.

U.S. Senate
Preceded by Joseph Simon	U.S. senator (Class 3) from Oregon; 1903–1909; Served alongside: John H. Mitchell, John M. Gearin, Frederick W. Mulkey, Jonathan Bourne, Jr.	Succeeded by George E. Chamberlain
