= H. Russell Albee =

Oregon politician

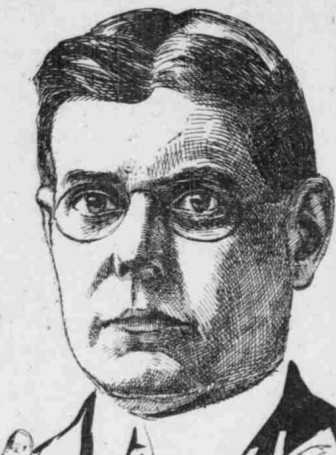
- Albee in 1905

38th Mayor of Portland, Oregon
- In office 1913–1917
- Preceded by: Allen G. Rushlight
- Succeeded by: George Luis Baker

Personal details
- Born: September 8, 1867 Rockford, Illinois, U.S.
- Died: December 31, 1950 (aged 83) Portland, Oregon, U.S.
- Party: Progressive
- Profession: businessman

Harry Russell Albee (September 8, 1867 – December 31, 1950) was mayor of Portland, Oregon, from 1913–1917.

== Early life ==
Albee was born in Rockford, Illinois.

== Career ==
Elected mayor on June 2, 1913, Albee was the first mayor to preside over Portland's commission form of government, which had been approved by only a very small fraction more than a majority of city voters on May 3. A recall effort against him and two commissioners in 1914 was unsuccessful. His administration gave attention to controversial matters including riverfront improvement, water meters, municipal garbage collection, vice, public transit rates, and slum housing conditions, but little was accomplished of long-range significance. By the end of his administration, the city had significantly cut back expenditures from the general fund, reducing it by 20 percent from $3.22 million to $2.5 million, even though the population of the city had grown by 5 percent since 1915. Paradoxically, the commission form of government came under fire for alleged waste and inefficiency. Portland remained the only large city in the United States to have a city commission form of government until 2025.

== See also ==
- Government of Portland, Oregon
- H. Russell Albee House
