= United States Senate Committee on Coast Defenses =

Defunct committee of U.S. Congress

The United States Senate Committee on Coast Defenses was created in 1885 to deal with the country's coastal defenses. It was abolished in 1921 during a reorganization of the U.S. Senate.

== Chairmen of the Committee on Coast Defenses, 1885-1921 ==
- Joseph Dolph (R-OR) 1885-1891
- Watson Squire (R-WA) 1891-1893
- John Gordon (D-GA) 1893-1895
- Watson Squire (R-WA) 1895-1897
- Joseph R. Hawley (R-CT) 1897
- George W. McBride (R-OR) 1898-1901
- John H. Mitchell (R-OR) 1901-1905
- Philander C. Knox (R-PA) 1905-1908
- George S. Nixon (R-NV) 1908-1911
- Charles Curtis (R-KS) 1911-1913
- James E. Martine (D-NJ) 1913-1914
- Blair Lee I (D-MD) 1914-1917
- Charles S. Thomas (D-CO) 1917-1919
- Joseph S. Frelinghuysen (R-NJ) 1919-1921
