= Oregon Irish Famine Memorial =

Memorial in Portland, Oregon, U.S.

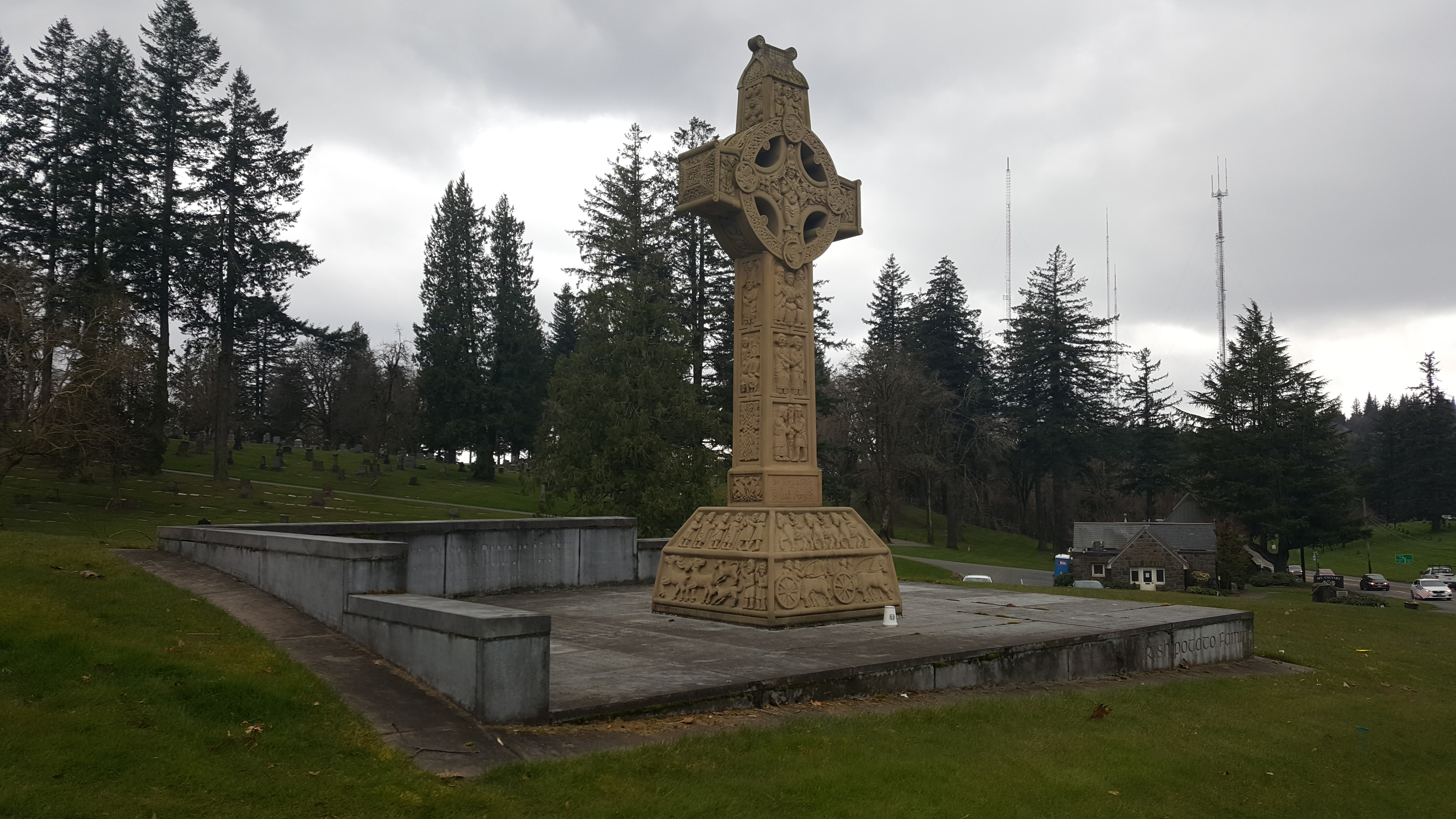
- The memorial in 2021
- Interactive map of Oregon Irish Famine Memorial
- Coordinates: 45°31′8.1″N 122°44′2.3″W

The Oregon Irish Famine Memorial is a memorial in Portland, Oregon's Mount Calvary Cemetery, in the United States. The 7-ton, 14-foot sculpture was designed by Brendan McGloin and dedicated in 2008. It features a sandstone cross with an Irish limestone base on a concrete foundation.

== See also ==
- List of memorials to the Great Famine
