= United States Senate Committee on Claims =

Standing committee in the U.S. Senate

The United States Senate Committee on Claims was among the first standing committees established in the Senate. It dealt generally with issues related to private bills and petitions. After reforms in the 1880s that created judicial and administrative remedies for petitioners, it declined in importance, and were abolished in 1946. The United States House of Representatives also had a Committee on Claims until 1946, when both the Senate and House duties were absorbed by the United States House Committee on the Judiciary.

== Chairmen of the Committee on Claims, 1816–1947 ==
- Jonathan Roberts (R-PA) 1816–1818
- Robert Henry Goldsborough (F-MD) 1818–1819
- Jonathan Roberts (R-PA) 1819–1820
- James J. Wilson (R-NJ) 1820–1821
- Benjamin Ruggles (R/NR-OH) 1821–1833
- Samuel Bell (W-NH) 1833–1835
- Arnold Naudain (W-DE) 1835–1836
- Henry Hubbard (D-NH) 1836–1841
- William A. Graham (W-NC) 1841–1843
- Ephraim Foster (W-TN) 1843–1845
- Isaac S. Pennybacker (D-VA) 1845–1847
- James Mason (D-VA) 1847–1849
- Moses Norris, Jr. (D-NH) 1849–1851
- Richard Brodhead (D-PA) 1851–1857
- Alfred Iverson, Sr. (D-GA) 1857–1861
- Daniel Clark (R-NH) 1861–1866
- Timothy Howe (R-WI) 1866–1873
- George Wright (R-IA) 1873–1877
- Samuel J. R. McMillan (R-MN) 1877–1879
- Francis Cockrell (D-MO) 1879–1881
- Angus Cameron (R-WI) 1881–1885
- Austin F. Pike (R-NH) 1885–1886
- John C. Spooner (R-WI) 1886–1891
- John H. Mitchell (R-OR) 1891–1893
- Samuel Pasco (D-FL) 1893–1895
- Henry M. Teller (R-CO) 1895–1899
- Francis E. Warren (R-WY) 1899–1905
- Charles W. Fulton (R-OR) 1905–1909
- Henry E. Burnham (R-NH) 1909–1911
- Coe I. Crawford (R-SD) 1911–1913
- Nathan P. Bryan (D-FL) 1913–1917
- Joseph T. Robinson (D-AR) 1917–1919
- Selden P. Spencer (R-MO) 1919–1922
- Arthur Capper (R-KS) 1922–1925
- Rice W. Means (R-CO) 1925–1927
- Robert B. Howell (R-NE) 1927–1933
- Josiah W. Bailey (D-NC) 1933–1940
- none 1940–1942
- Prentiss M. Brown (D-MI) 1942–1943
- Josiah W. Bailey (D-NC) 1943–1944
- Allen J. Ellender (D-LA) 1944–1947

== See also ==
- List of defunct United States congressional committees
