= Mount Calvary Cemetery (Portland, Oregon) =

Cemetery in Portland, Oregon

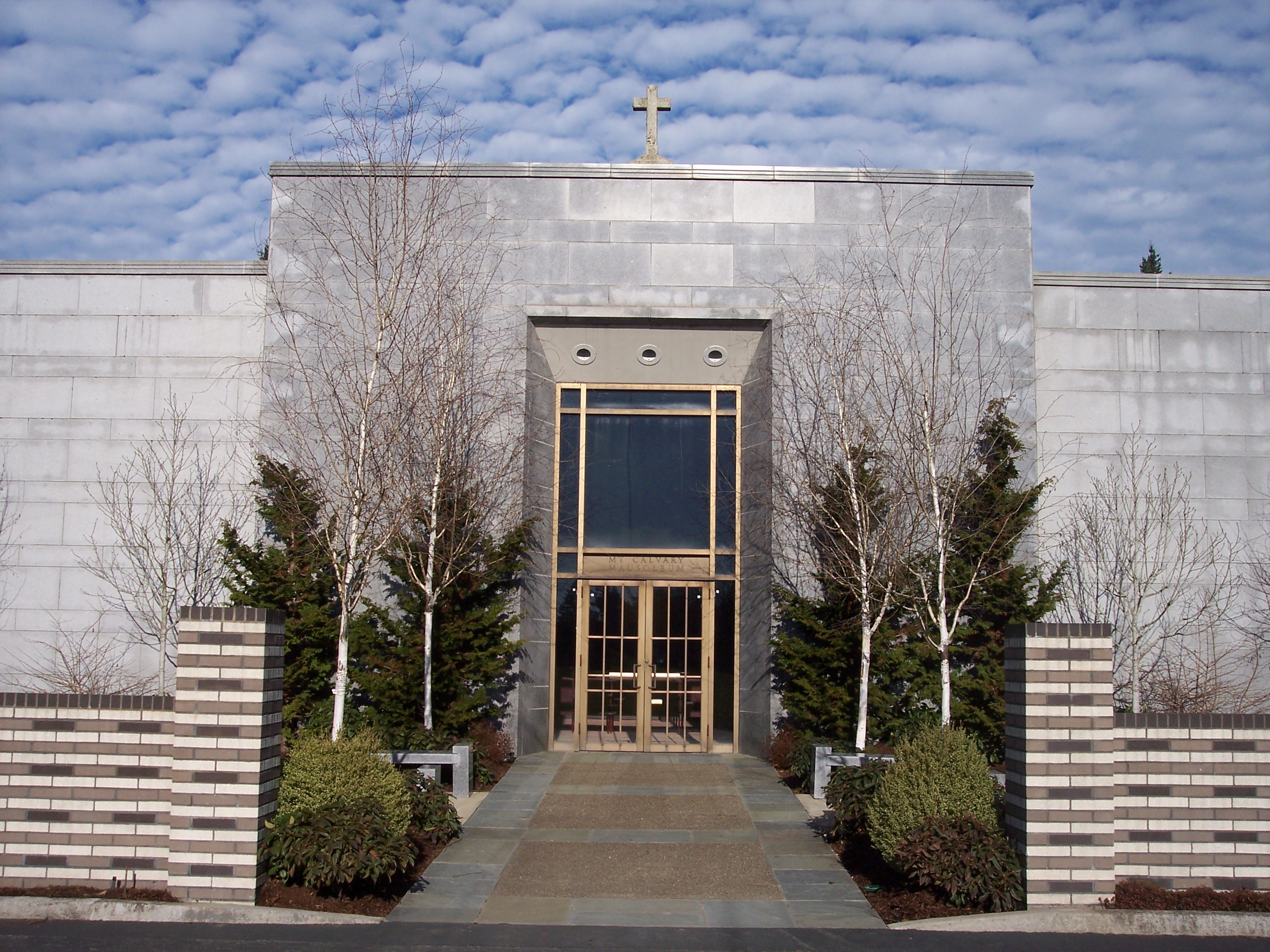
- Mount Calvary Mausoleum in Mount Calvary Cemetery
- Interactive map of Mount Calvary Cemetery

Details
- Established: 1888
- Location: 333 SW Skyline Boulevard, Portland, Oregon 97221
- Country: United States
- Coordinates: 45.5186°N 122.7370°W
- Type: Private; Catholic
- Owned by: Roman Catholic Archdiocese of Portland in Oregon
- Size: 100 acres (400,000 m^{2})
- No. of graves: 20,000+
- Website: Official website
- Find a Grave: Mount Calvary Cemetery

Mount Calvary Cemetery in the West Hills of Portland, Oregon, United States, is a private cemetery owned and maintained by the Roman Catholic Archdiocese of Portland in Oregon. It is the second-oldest Catholic cemetery in Multnomah County, and was the third cemetery built in the West Hills.

== History ==
In 1858, the Portland Archdiocese established its first cemetery, St. Mary's Cemetery, in Southeast Portland adjacent to Lone Fir Cemetery. By the late 1800s, that site was becoming full and a new site was needed. In 1888, the Archdiocese purchased 100 acres (400,000 m^{2}) in the West Hills and established Mount Calvary Cemetery.

In 1930, St. Mary's was closed and the interments were relocated, mostly to Mount Calvary, and Central Catholic High School was built on the site of the old cemetery. In 1961, the Archdiocese opened a second cemetery in the Portland area, Gethsemani Catholic Cemetery, located in Happy Valley.

== Facilities ==
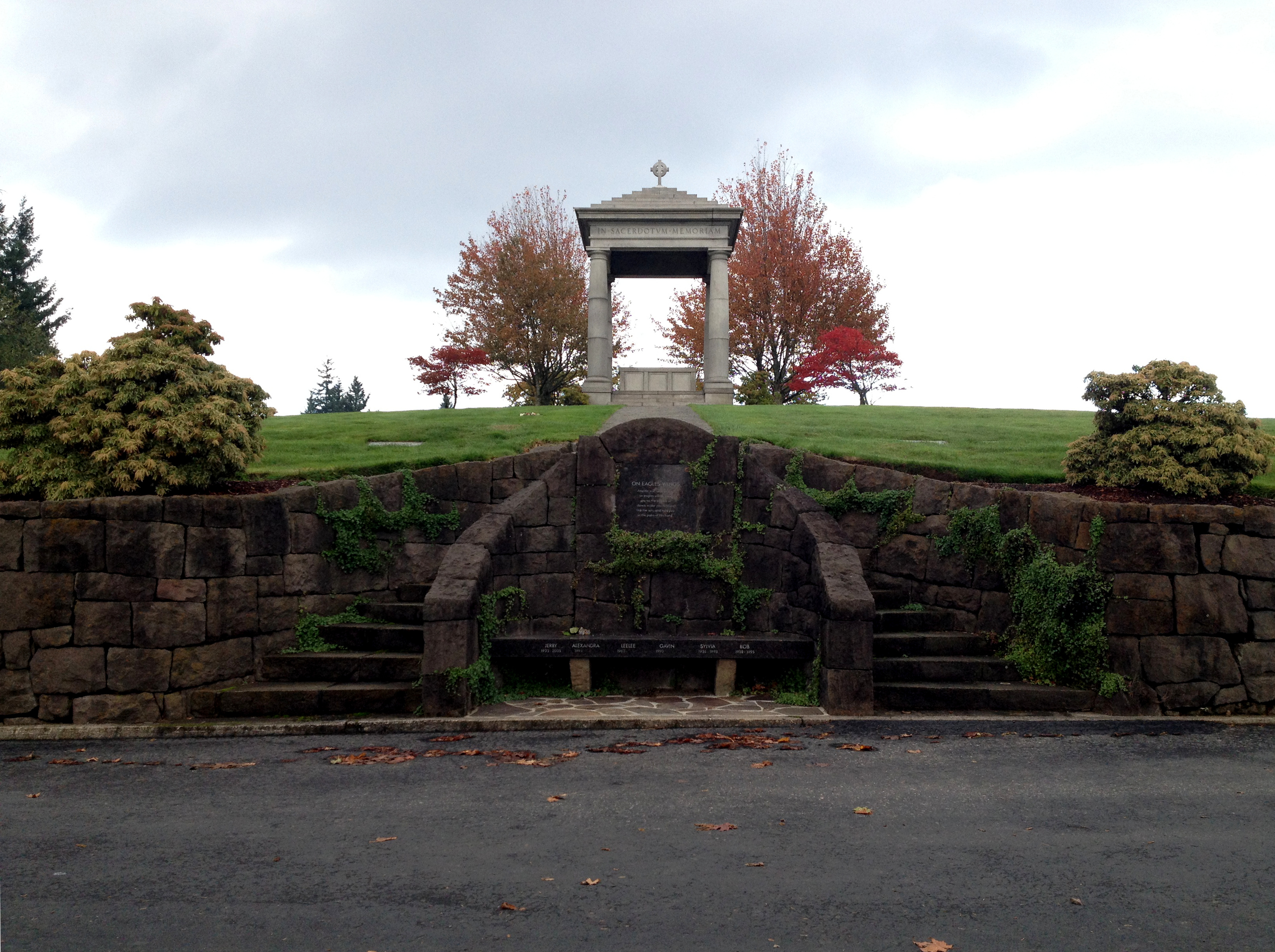
The hilltop altar is located on the north side of the Cemetery and bears the Latin inscription "In Sacerdotum Memoriam"

From its location in the West Hills, Mount Calvary has views of Portland and the surrounding mountains in the Cascade Range, as well as the Columbia River. In addition to more than 20,000 graves, the site contains a mausoleum, columbarium, and a hilltop altar for the celebration of Mass.

== Notable burials ==
The cemetery is the final resting place for several archbishops of Portland as well as politicians, businessmen, actors, and sports figures.

- James M. Burns (1924–2001), federal judge
- Nonpareil Dempsey (1862–1895), boxing champion
- Christopher Evans (1847–1917), outlaw
- John M. Gearin (1851–1930), U.S. Representative from Oregon
- Ben Holladay (1819–1887), 19th century transportation businessman known as the "Stagecoach King"
- Edward Howard (1877–1983) archbishop of Portland and centenarian
- Larry Keating (1896–1963), actor
- Frank Leahy (1908–1973), college football coach at Notre Dame
- Richard Hedlund (1928–2019), “Portland’s mortician”
- Hall S. Lusk (1883–1983), Chief Justice of the Oregon Supreme Court and U.S. Senator from Oregon
- Cornelius Michael Power (1913–1997) archbishop of Portland
- George Shaw (1933–1998), American football player
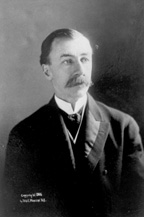
John M. Gearin

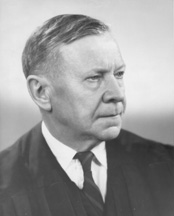
Hall S. Lusk

== See also ==
- Oregon Irish Famine Memorial
