= H. Russell Albee House =

Historic house in Portland, Oregon, U.S.

- U.S. National Register of Historic Places
- U.S. Historic district – Contributing property
- Portland Historic Landmark
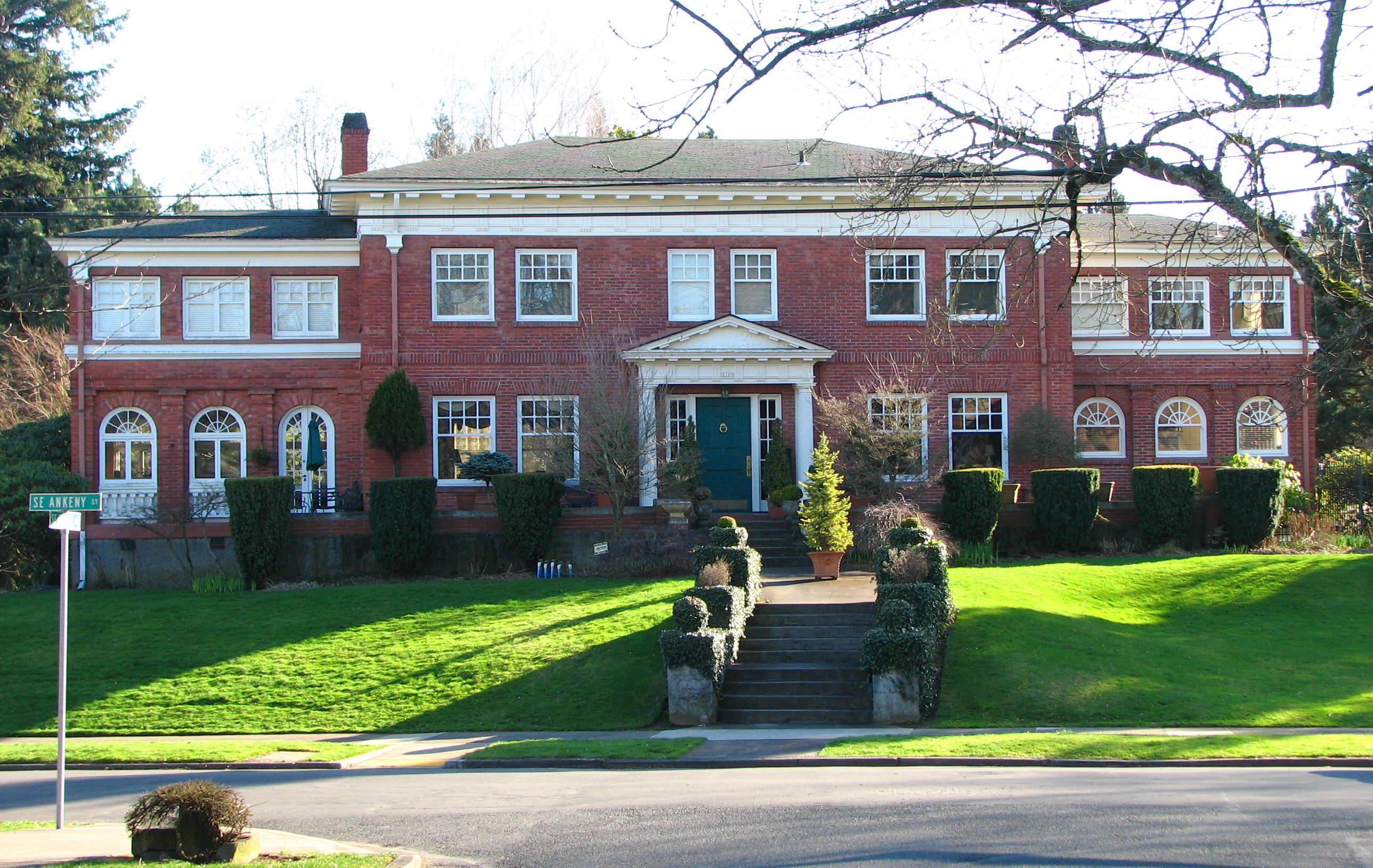
- The house's front exterior in 2010
- Location: 3360 SE Ankeny Street; Portland, Oregon
- Coordinates: 45°31′19″N 122°37′43″W
- Area: 0.7 acres (0.28 ha)
- Built: 1912
- Architect: Albert Ernest Doyle
- Architectural style: Colonial Revival
- Part of: Laurelhurst Historic District (ID100003462)
- NRHP reference No.: 92001332

Significant dates
- Added to NRHP: October 22, 1992
- Designated CP: March 18, 2019

The H. Russell Albee House is a dwelling in the southeast Portland part of the Laurelhurst neighborhood, in the U.S. state of Oregon. The house is listed on the National Register of Historic Places.

A Colonial Revival structure built in 1912 for future Portland mayor H. Russell Albee, it was added to the register in 1992.

== See also ==
- National Register of Historic Places listings in Southeast Portland, Oregon
