= Joseph N. Dolph =

American politician (1835–1897)

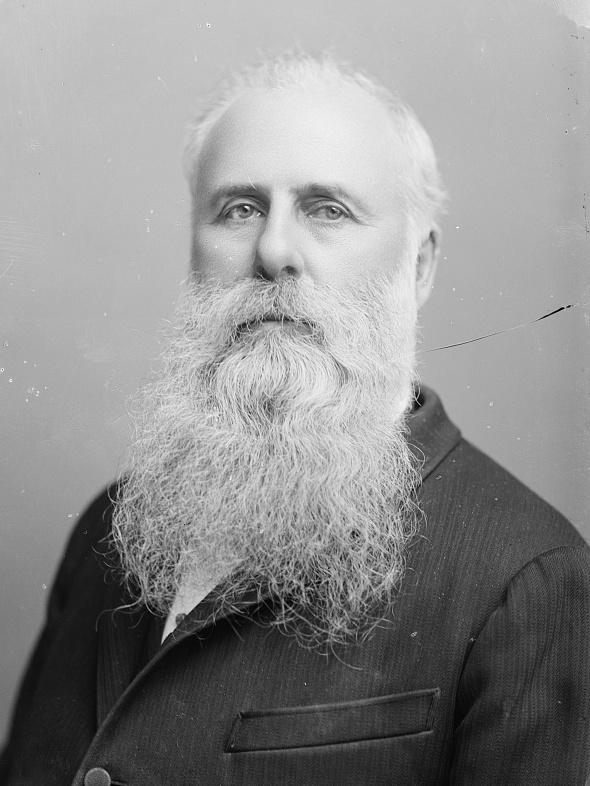
- Dolph c. 1891–1894

United States Senator from Oregon
- In office March 4, 1883 – March 3, 1895
- Preceded by: La Fayette Grover
- Succeeded by: George W. McBride

Member of the Oregon Senate
- In office 1866; 1872; 1874

Personal details
- Born: October 19, 1835 Dolphsburg, Schuyler County, New York, U.S.
- Died: March 10, 1897 (aged 61) Portland, Oregon, U.S.
- Party: Republican
- Profession: Attorney

Joseph Norton Dolph (October 19, 1835 – March 10, 1897) was an American politician and attorney in the state of Oregon. A native of the state of New York, he immigrated to Oregon over the Oregon Trail and settled in Portland where he became the state's federal district attorney. A Republican, he spent nine years in the Oregon State Senate before serving in the United States Senate from 1883 to 1895.

== Early life ==
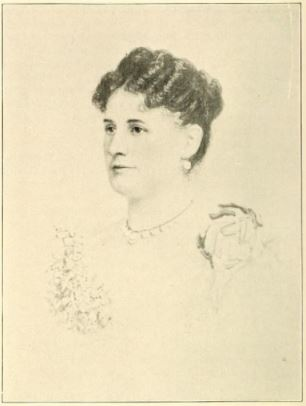
Augusta E. Mulkey

Joseph Dolph was born in Dolphsburg, Schuyler County, New York, on October 19, 1835. The son of Elizabeth W. and Chester V. Dolph, his brother was Cyrus A. Dolph and his nephew was Frederick W. Mulkey. Dolph earned his education at local public and private schools and then attended the Genesee Wesleyan Seminary in Lima. He studied law and was admitted to practice law after passing the bar in 1861.

== Law career ==
Dolph set up practice in Schuyler County, New York, and also taught school. He read about the Western United States and decided to move west. In 1862, he and his brother Cyrus enlisted in the Oregon Escort, which protected settlers traveling to Oregon from Native Americans.

After being honorably discharged at Fort Walla Walla in Washington Territory, Dolph settled in Portland and resumed the practice of law. He became the city's attorney, serving from 1864 to 1865, and then Oregon's United States district attorney from 1865 to 1868. In 1864, he married Augusta E. Mulkey, and the couple had six children.

He served on the Portland Public Schools board from 1870 to 1873.

In 1873, Dolph co-founded the law firm of Dolph, Bronaugh, Dolph & Simon with his brother and with E. C. Bronaugh and Joseph Simon. He continued practicing with the firm until his election to the U.S. Senate almost a decade later.

== Political career ==
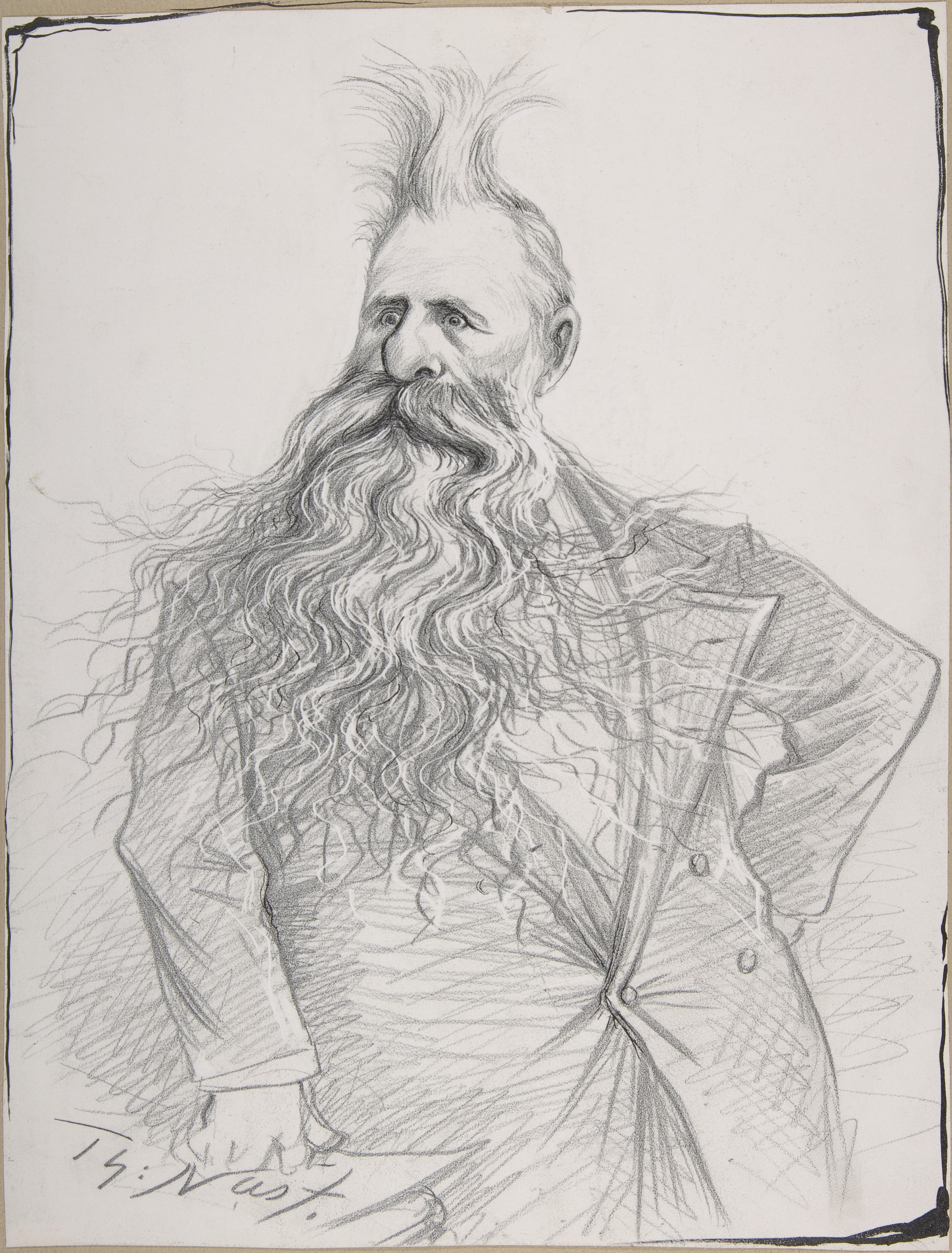
Caricature of Dolph by Thomas Nast, circa 1894

In 1866, Dolph was elected to the Oregon State Senate as a Republican representing Multnomah County. He returned to the legislature in 1872, and also served during the 1874 session, both times in the state senate. He gave a speech in McMinnville, Oregon, at McMinnville College (now Linfield College) on May 31, 1882, at the laying of the cornerstone for the first building on campus, which is known today as Pioneer Hall. He continued practicing law with Dolph, Bronaugh, Dolph & Simon when the legislature was not in session.

In 1882, he was elected to the United States Senate by the Oregon Legislative Assembly in a contest that drew national attention. Dolph was not even considered a candidate when deliberations began at the state capital, but state Republican leaders elected him to the six-year term. He became the chairman of the United States Senate Committee on Coast Defenses in the Forty-ninth through Fifty-second Congresses and the United States Senate Committee on Public Lands in the Fifty-second Congress. Dolph was re-elected in 1888 to a second six-year term, but did not win re-election in 1894 and in total he served in the Senate from March 4, 1883, to March 3, 1895.

== Later years ==
Upon leaving the Senate, he moved back to Portland where he returned to the practice of law, and over the years had been partners with many high-profile Portland lawyers including Joseph Simon, John H. Mitchell, Rufus Mallory, Charles B. Bellinger, and even his brother Cyrus. He and his firms represented a variety of clients that included transportation magnates Ben Holladay and Henry Villard, the Oregon Steam Navigation Company, and the Oregon and California Railroad among others. Joseph Norton Dolph died on March 10, 1897, at the age of 61 in Portland. Dolph was interred there in River View Cemetery. The former town of Dolph, in Tillamook County in the Northern Oregon Coast Range was named after the Senator.

U.S. Senate
Preceded by La Fayette Grover	U.S. senator (Class 2) from Oregon; 1883–1895; Served alongside: James H. Slater, John H. Mitchell	Succeeded by George W. McBride
