= Allen G. Rushlight =

American politician

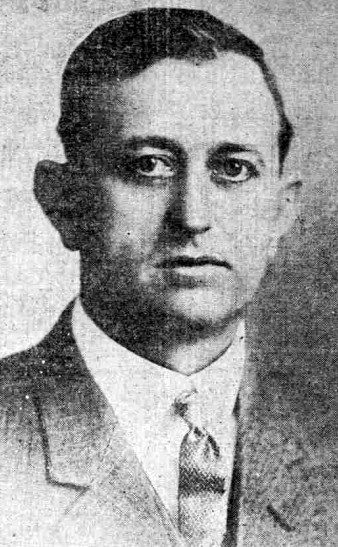

37th Mayor of Portland, Oregon
- In office 1911–1913
- Preceded by: Joseph Simon
- Succeeded by: H. Russell Albee

Member of the Oregon House of Representatives from the 18th district
- In office 1910; 1925–1930

Personal details
- Born: February 26, 1874 Golden, Colorado, US
- Died: January 6, 1930 (aged 55) Portland, Oregon, US
- Party: Republican
- Profession: Plumber/Businessman

Allen Golden Rushlight (February 26, 1874 – January 6, 1930) was an American politician and businessman, in the U.S. state of Oregon. A Republican, Rushlight served one term as mayor of Portland, Oregon, and was later elected to three terms in the Oregon House of Representatives.

== Early life ==
Rushlight was born in Golden City, Colorado to Samuel and Mary Elizabeth Miller Rushlight and moved with his family to Portland, Oregon at the age of 3. At the age of 14, Rushlight apprenticed as a plumber and eventually started a successful Portland plumbing business. In 1901, he married Emma Webber, with whom he had two children. After his wife's death in 1910, Rushlight married Agnes O'Connor, with whom he had one more child.

== Mayoral career ==
In 1905, Rushlight was elected to the Portland City Council. In 1909, he ran for mayor of Portland, but was defeated by Joseph Simon. Later that year, he was elected to the Oregon House of Representatives, but declined to serve, instead remaining on the city council. In 1911, Rushlight ran again for mayor against Simon, and this time, was elected.

As mayor, Rushlight was pragmatic as the young city built its infrastructure and worked to keep costs low. He sometimes used his plumbing background to personally inspect engineering projects and once climbed into the city crematory to diagnose a problem, which, when repaired for a few dollars, doubled its capacity. Rushlight spent much of his term unsuccessfully trying to get the city to build on Ross Island, an undeveloped island in the Willamette River, with plans for an industrial center, parks, a prison, and a contagious hospital.

Rushlight was faced with several vice-related scandals during his term: concerns about long-standing issues with gambling and prostitution led Rushlight to create the Portland Vice Commission to investigate. Members of the commission went block by block and uncovered widespread prostitution at hotels and rooming houses throughout the city, often with the knowledge and tacit approval of the city's business and political leaders. Oregon governor Oswald West pressured Rushlight to clean up the city, and some reforms were made. The Portland vice scandal, which revealed the presence of a gay male subculture in Portland, broke in 1912, and Rushlight pledged reforms to ensure the "safety of the boys."

In May 1913, the various scandals and widespread municipal corruption (much of which predated Rushlight's administration) led Portland voters, over Rushlight's objections, to adopt a new form of municipal government: the city commission government, which made each city council member accountable for a specific city department. Portland was the last major U.S. city to still use this style of city government until it was replaced by the mayor–council government system in a 2022 ballot measure. He sought another two-year term in June 1913, but was defeated by Progressive H. Russell Albee.

== Later career and death ==
After leaving office, Rushlight continued to build his plumbing business, which grew to handle some of the largest contracts in the Northwest. In 1925, Rushlight returned to politics, and was again elected to the Oregon House of Representatives; he was re-elected in 1927 and 1929. He died of complications of pneumonia in 1930. He is buried in Portland's River View Cemetery.
