= Harry Lane =

American politician (1855–1917)

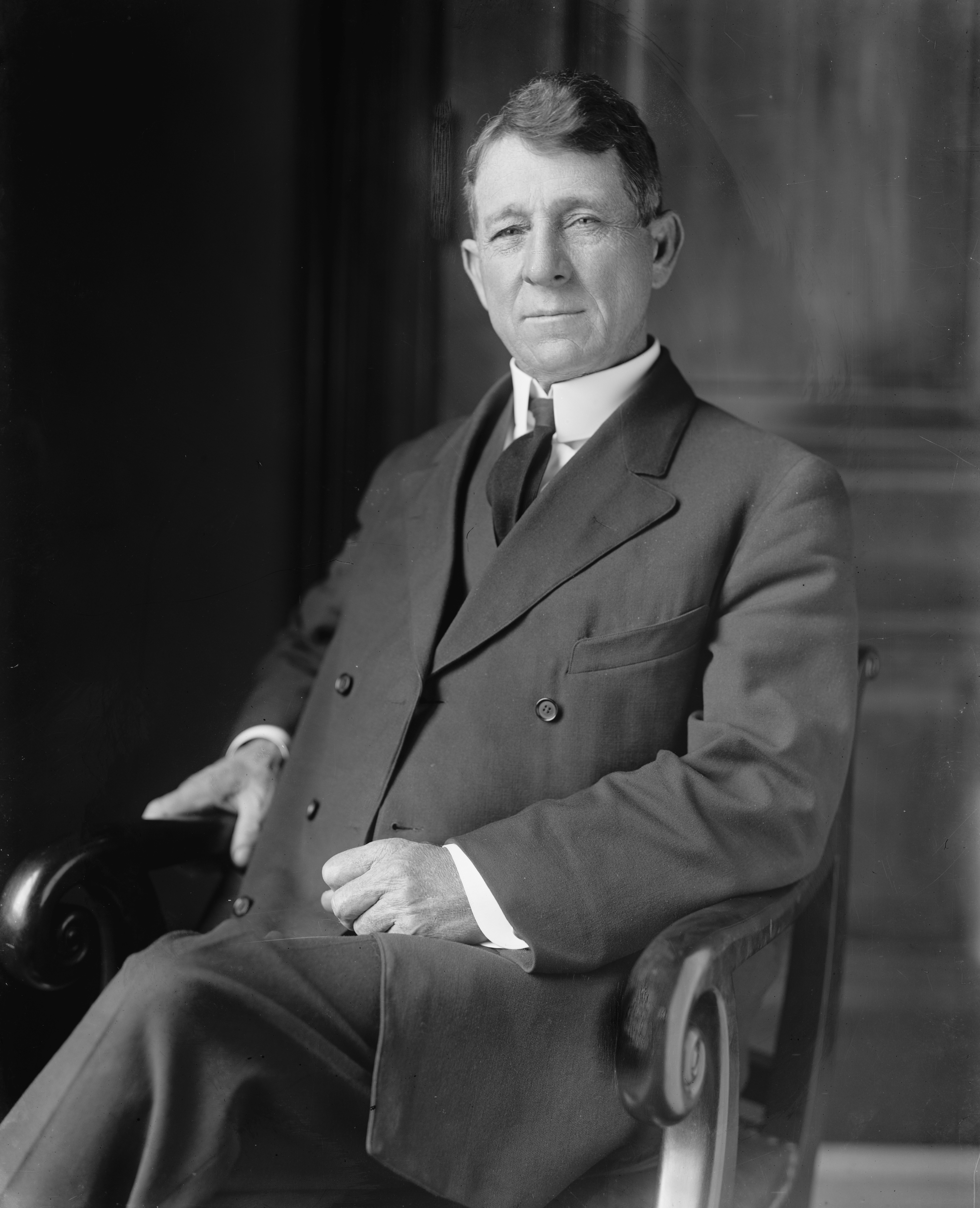
- Lane, 1905–1917

United States Senator from Oregon
- In office March 4, 1913 – May 23, 1917
- Preceded by: Jonathan Bourne Jr.
- Succeeded by: Charles L. McNary

35th Mayor of Portland, Oregon
- In office 1905–1909
- Preceded by: George Henry Williams
- Succeeded by: Joseph Simon

Personal details
- Born: August 28, 1855 Corvallis, Oregon, U.S.
- Died: May 23, 1917 (aged 61) San Francisco, California, U.S.
- Party: Independent (1905–1912); Democratic (1912–1917)
- Relatives: Joseph Lane (grandfather)
- Profession: Doctor

Harry Lane (August 28, 1855 – May 23, 1917) was an American politician in the state of Oregon. A physician by training, Lane served as the head of the Oregon State Insane Asylum before being forced out by political enemies. After a decade practicing medicine, the progressive Democrat won election as the mayor of Portland in 1905, gaining re-election in 1907. Lane's tenure in office was largely uneventful, although he did gain lasting recognition for having appointed the first female police officer in America in 1908 as well as for his vision that the city should host an annual Rose Festival.

In November 1912, Lane was elected to the United States Senate where he was a leading advocate for women's suffrage and a more benevolent relationship between the American government and the nation's Native American population. He voted against American participation in World War I in April 1917, an action which made him the prospective subject of a recall effort. This campaign was rendered moot when Lane died in office on May 23, 1917.

== Biography ==
=== Early years ===
Harry Lane was born in Corvallis, Oregon, a small town on the banks of the Willamette River, on August 28, 1855. He was the son of Eliza Jane and Nathaniel Lane. The elder Lane was a successful participant in the California Gold Rush of the late 1840s who had returned to Oregon to invest his mining proceeds in construction of a lumber mill.

The Lanes were part of a prominent Oregon political family. Nathaniel Lane's father Joseph Lane had been the first territorial Governor of Oregon and was immortalized as the namesake of Lane County, Oregon. In the election of 1860 Joseph Lane had achieved national prominence as the Vice Presidential running mate of John C. Breckinridge on the pro-slavery Southern Democratic Party ticket — with the pair carrying 11 states in a losing effort to Abraham Lincoln. Nathaniel's brother, Lafayette Lane, was elected a member of the Oregon Legislature and United States Congress. Harry would eventually continue the family tradition, albeit as a Democrat of an altogether different stripe than had been his uncle and grandfather.

The Lane family's mill was destroyed in a fire and his parents opened a general store following the catastrophe. It was there that Harry began his employment career at the age of 13, working part-time as a clerk. Harry continued to attend the public schools of Corvallis, graduating from Corvallis High School. Upon graduation Lane enrolled at Willamette University, located in the capital city of Salem, from which he graduated in 1876.

In 1878, Lane earned a medical degree from Willamette's medical school and then continued his medical education with postgraduate work at the College of Physicians and Surgeons in New York City.

=== Medical career ===
Lane returned to Oregon after completing his post-graduate education, which included time spent in New York, Europe, and San Francisco. Lane put down roots and opened a medical practice in the state's largest city, Portland, where he would eventually serve as the president of city, county, and state medical societies.

In 1887, Lane was tapped by Governor Sylvester Pennoyer to become the superintendent of the Oregon State Insane Asylum (known today as the Oregon State Hospital). Lane aggressively investigated charges of corruption in conjunction with the hospital — activity which made him no few enemies. In 1891 Governor Pennoyer responded to political pressure critical of Lane and forced him to resign his post at the hospital. The experience left Lane disgusted and distrustful of the political process.

Lane returned to medical practice in Portland, working for the next decade as a "poor people's doctor," frequently on a pro bono basis. Harry Lane was "better at making friends than making money," his widow later recalled.

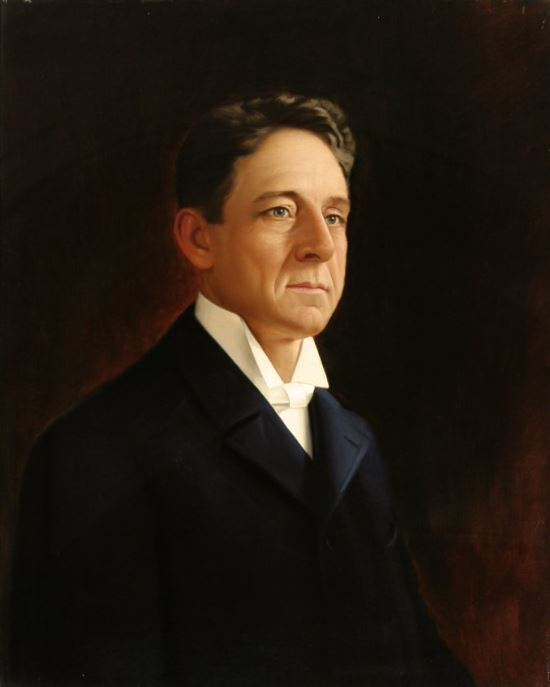
Lane's official mayoral portrait

=== Mayor of Portland ===
Lane was won over to the ideas of direct democracy and political reform that were part and parcel of the Progressive Era in the United States. In 1902 he ran his first political campaign, standing for Oregon State Senate on an independent reform ticket. The campaign was unsuccessful but Lane was bitten by the "political bug" and other electoral efforts were soon to follow.

In 1905, Lane ran for the non-partisan position of Mayor of Portland. This time Lane emerged victorious and he served two 2-year terms. Lane attempted to govern the city as a social reformer but he frequently found himself the holder of an ineffective veto pen, as saloon and corporate interests continued to control the agenda of the Portland City Council. Although he was popular among voters, as mayor he accomplished little of lasting value because, not being a "party man", he had no leverage with the leaders of either party. His independent spirit was seen as a symbol around which the "common people" could rally in defiance of the established business-political leadership. He also helped the mayors of other cities in California and Oregon to create jobs for the homeless, instead of sending them from city to city as was a common practice at the time.

As mayor, Lane was an enthusiastic host for a national convention in support of women's suffrage in 1905, and he was thereafter recognized as a friend of the movement for equality between the sexes. He took a further step for the advance of women's rights when he swore in Lola Baldwin to the Portland Police Bureau as one of the first female police officers in the United States on April 1, 1908.

While mayor, at the end of the Lewis and Clark Centennial Exposition, he advocated for a "permanent rose carnival", leading him to be called the "Father of the Portland Rose Festival", which continues today.

Lane was an advocate of direct democracy and led an unsuccessful voter referendum to establish municipal ownership of the Portland electric system. A flurry of measures were taken before the voters — 32 proposals in 1909 alone. Among his successes at the polls in these direct votes, Lane was instrumental in winning approval of a new mandate that future utility franchises granted by the city should be subject to popular vote rather than back-room dealmaking between interested parties and elected politicians.

Throughout his life Lane was committed to exposing and correcting the wrongs suffered by Native Americans at the hands of European immigrants to America. At a 1905 unveiling of a statue of Sacajawea Mayor Lane declared that violence between native and white populations had always been the result of "white people ill-treating the Indians who had befriended them."

Harry Lane as he appeared in a news photo during his Senatorial term.

=== Member of the U.S. Senate ===
The 1912 Oregon ballot for the United States Senate was cluttered. In addition to the Democrat Harry Lane and Ben Selling, a candidate of the conservative wing of the Republican Party, progressive Republicans had other electoral alternatives, including the Progressive Party candidate and the incumbent senator Jonathan Bourne Jr., who had failed to win the renomination of the Republican party and ran as the "Popular Government" nominee as a result. Meanwhile, Benjamin Ramp stood for the Socialists and yet another candidate was the nominee of the Prohibition Party. Astoundingly, each of these six candidates took more than 5% of the vote — which enabled Democrat Lane to win election with a plurality of the vote in solidly Republican Oregon. Intent on proving himself a man of the people, Harry Lane set what might be a record for campaign frugality in his victorious effort, with his entire race run for the princely sum of $75 plus travel expenses.

He was also known for frugality as a congressman, and did not conform to the modern stereotype of the free-spending liberal. He was reported as being "the most inquisitive man in Congress" when it came to federal appropriations, and was known as "the human question mark" by his colleagues in the Senate. He was opposed to deficits and the "pure waste of public funds."

Lane's daughter herself was a member of the Socialist Party of America, as was her husband, the journalist Isaac McBride. Upon his election the increasingly radical Harry Lane wasted no time in hiring his son-in-law as his personal secretary and administrative assistant. McBride remained active in the anti-militarism activities of the Socialist Party even while working for Lane and was the intermediary between "Big Bill" Haywood of the Industrial Workers of the World and Lane, gaining the Senator's help in an unsuccessful effort to spare the life of IWW cause célèbre Joe Hill.

While in Congress he served on the Committee on Forest Reservations and Game Protection, the Committee on Fisheries, and the Committee on Indian Affairs. Lane regarded the last of these as his most important work, criticizing longstanding government policy aimed at "civilizing" the Native American population.

Lane pulled no punches:

I think the whole scheme of our management of the affairs of the Indian is a mistake. It is wrong; it is expensive to the Government; it is fatal to the Indians.

Senator Lane posing for a press photo.

The poverty of the Indian population was through no fault of their own, Lane declared, with the Native American people prostrate while "the white man is astride them and is at work taking everything they have."

In addition to his distinctly radical views on Indian Affairs, Lane championed a number of other controversial views as a member of the Senate. He was a leading advocate for the woman suffrage movement, introducing resolutions in its behalf. Lane also supported government ownership of the national telephone and telegraph networks, the merchant marine, and certain mining corporations. He was critical of the Clayton Antitrust Act for its toothless inability to restrain the avarice of "big business and crooks."

Lane challenged white supremacist Senator Hoke Smith of Georgia on the floor of the Senate to acknowledge the successes of black farmers in the American South and protested instances of racial discrimination inserted into appropriations legislation. He was skeptical about American claims of violation of property rights by the government and insurgent movements in Mexico and was an outspoken opponent of imperialism and for the national independence of the Philippines.

It was with respect to American involvement in World War I that Lane was his most outspoken. Late in 1915 Lane joined Socialist U.S. Representative Meyer London of New York in co-sponsoring a resolution criticizing the deepening sense of war-related fear and calling upon President Woodrow Wilson to convene a conference of neutral nations with a view to ending the European conflict. Even after the resumption of unlimited German submarine warfare in their effort to blockade their enemies, Lane refused to support an end to diplomatic relations with the German Empire. Lane was an outspoken opponent of Wilson's plan to arm merchant ships, arguing that the conservative Democratic President was thereby attempting to usurp the Congressional prerogative to declare war and to replace it with Executive authority.

This filibuster to block Wilson's effort to expand war powers through his Armed Neutrality Bill proved successful. Lane and his co-thinkers, including Wisconsin Senator Robert M. La Follette, became the targets of intense political hostility in the aftermath, however, with President Wilson demeaning them as "a little group of willful men, representing no opinion but their own" who nevertheless "rendered the great Government of the United States helpless and contemptible." Many Oregonians were similarly incensed, and an outcry erupted for Lane's recall from office. An editorial in The Oregonian stated "Next to being ashamed of Harry Lane for what he has done ... the people of Oregon are ashamed of themselves for having sent Harry Lane to the United States Senate." Although the press lambasted him, a friend wrote in a letter that the majority of people "insist that you did exactly right ... It is the newspapers that are doing most of the kicking."

=== Death and legacy ===
Lane was a chronically ill person in 1917, suffering from Bright's disease or advanced arteriosclerosis. His precarious condition was further undermined by the intense barrage of public criticism to which he was subjected. Nevertheless, on April 4, 1917, against the advice of doctors, Lane made his way to the Senate floor to vote against the Declaration of War against Germany which had been the product of an April 2 speech by the President. Joining Lane in opposition were just five other Senators: Robert La Follette, William J. Stone, James Vardaman, Asle Gronna, and George W. Norris.

Shortly after the vote Lane's health gave way and he collapsed. He died in San Francisco en route to Portland on May 23, 1917.

Harry Lane was buried at Lone Fir Cemetery in Portland and Charles L. McNary was appointed to finish Lane's term.

A small collection of Harry Lane papers are held by the research library of the Oregon Historical Society in Portland. The material includes a small number of letters to and from Lane, as well as a draft for an uncompleted biography prepared during the 1940s.

== Works ==
- Panama Canal Tolls: Speech. Washington, DC: US Government Printing Office, 1914.
- Child Labor and the Constitution: Speech in the Senate of the United States, August 8, 1916. Washington, DC: US Government Printing Office, 1916.
- One Way to Keep Out of European War: Remarks of Hon. Harry Lane of Oregon, in the Senate of the United States, February 7 and 8, 1917. Washington, DC: US Government Printing Office, 1917.

== See also ==
- List of members of the United States Congress who died in office (1900–1949)

Party political offices
First	Democratic nominee for U.S. Senator from Oregon (Class 2); 1913	Succeeded by Oswald West
U.S. Senate
Preceded by Jonathan Bourne Jr.	U.S. Senator (Class 2) from Oregon; 1913–1917	Succeeded by Charles L. McNary
Political offices
Preceded by George Henry Williams	Mayor of Portland, Oregon; 1905–1909	Succeeded by Joseph Simon
