= John H. Mitchell =

American lawyer and politician (1835–1905)

John Mitchell
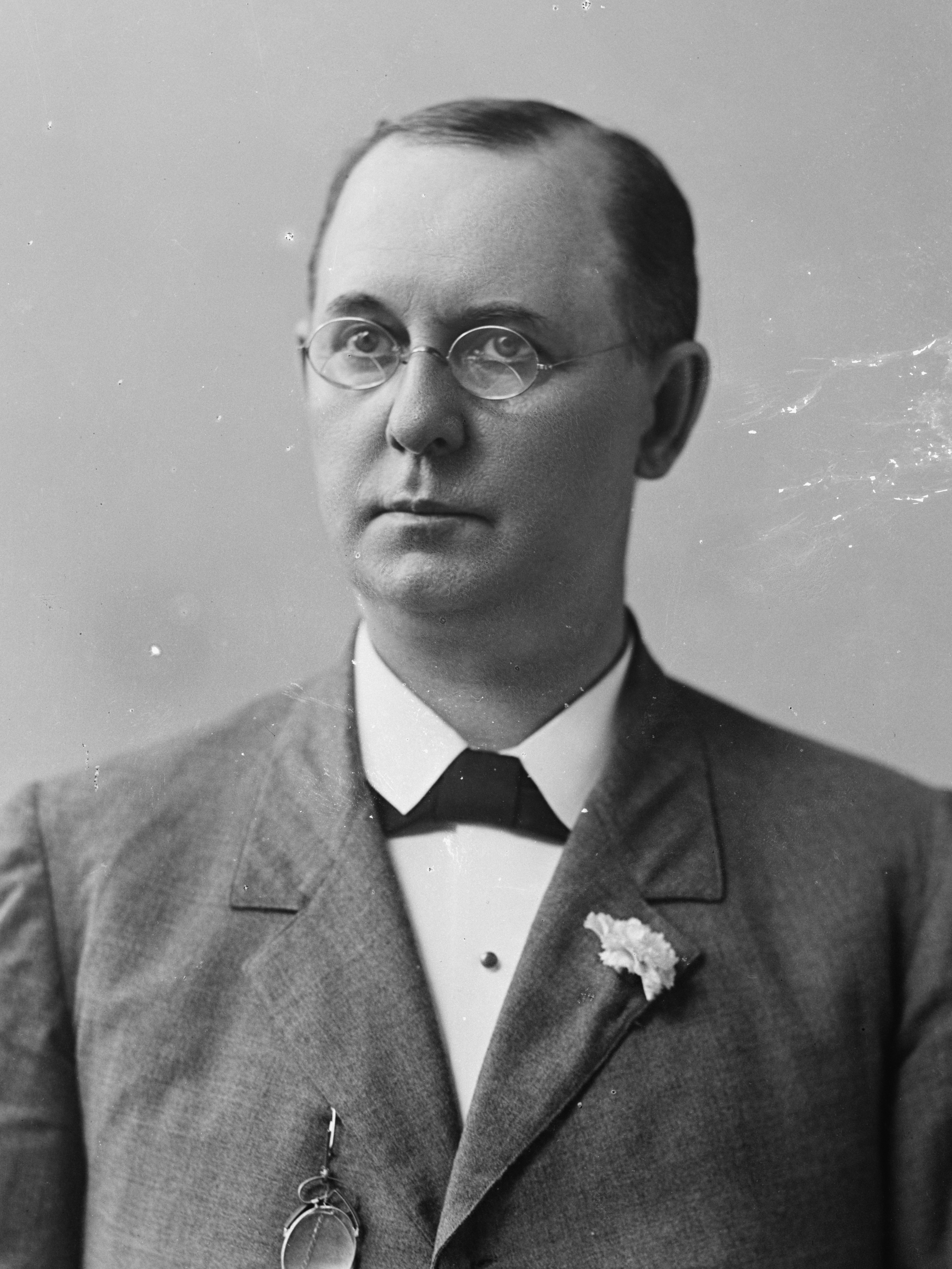
- Mitchell c. 1891–1894

United States Senator from Oregon
- In office March 4, 1901 – December 8, 1905
- Preceded by: George W. McBride
- Succeeded by: John M. Gearin
- In office November 18, 1885 – March 3, 1897
- Preceded by: James H. Slater
- Succeeded by: Joseph Simon
- In office March 4, 1873 – March 3, 1879
- Preceded by: Henry W. Corbett
- Succeeded by: James H. Slater

3rd President of the Oregon Senate
- In office 1864–1866
- Preceded by: Wilson Bowlby
- Succeeded by: Thomas R. Cornelius

Member of the Oregon Senate from the Multnomah County district
- In office 1862–1866

Personal details
- Born: John Mitchell Hipple; June 22, 1835 Washington County, Pennsylvania, U.S.
- Died: December 8, 1905 (aged 70) Portland, Oregon, U.S.
- Party: Republican

John Hipple Mitchell (born John Mitchell Hipple; June 23, 1835 – December 8, 1905) was an American lawyer and politician. He served as a Republican United States senator from Oregon on three occasions between 1873 and 1905. He also served as president of the state senate, did the initial legal work involved in the dispute that led to the Supreme Court case of Pennoyer v. Neff, and later was involved with the Oregon land fraud scandal, for which he was indicted and convicted. He is one of twelve U.S. Senators indicted while in office, and one of six convicted.

== Early life ==
John Mitchell Hipple was born in Washington County, Pennsylvania. He moved with his parents to Butler County, Pennsylvania, at the age of two. He attended public schools during much of his childhood, but also attended some private schools including the Witherspoon Institute. As a young man he was a schoolteacher. He seduced a 15-year-old female student named Sadie Hoon, and, due to the resulting scandal, was forced to marry her.

== Legal career ==
In 1859, Mitchell stopped teaching and became a lawyer. He built a law practice in Pennsylvania. However, in 1860, he left his community and family, and moved to California with a local schoolteacher with whom he was having an affair. After arriving in California, he abandoned her and moved to Portland, Oregon. It was then that he decided to change his name to John Hipple Mitchell, using his middle name as his last name, and attempted to start a completely new life in Oregon. He became a successful lawyer and build political connections. Mitchell was not an intellectual man, but he was very ambitious and knew how to develop business and political friendships with important people. In 1867, he was hired as a professor at Willamette University School of Medicine to teach medical jurisprudence. Mitchell remained as professor for almost four years.

Wendy Collins Purdue, Dean of Richmond Law, provides a description for Mitchell as an unethical and unskilled lawyer who used his significant charisma to find success, both in lawyering and later in his political career. Mitchell was more than willing to defraud his own clients. In one case, he acted as a guardian on behalf of a widow, wherein he moved to sell some of her land to supposedly pay for the expenses of the guardianship, turned around and bought the land himself at a cheap price and then resold it at market value for a sizeable profit. In another action, a client came to Mitchell looking for help with debt. Mitchell instead informed the creditors of the client's location, and was appointed as the debt collector. Mitchell then extorted the money out of his client.

=== Pennoyer v. Neff ===
During his law practice in Oregon, Mitchell did some legal work for Marcus Neff. A dispute between the men over an allegedly unpaid legal bill and the subsequent seizure of Neff's land ultimately led to the United States Supreme Court case Pennoyer v. Neff. The case defined in personam jurisdiction over citizens of different states for decades to come.

There is speculation that Mitchell may have falsified the original lawsuit (which may have itself emerged from an illegal deal between Mitchell and Neff), but nevertheless, Mitchell avoided notifying Neff of the lawsuit against him and successfully obtained a judgment by default. He took title to Neff's homestead, and when Neff discovered this, Mitchell assigned the land to wealthy lumber industrialist Sylvester Pennoyer. After the Supreme Court ruling in Neff's favor, Pennoyer was left without recourse. Pennoyer would later become the eighth governor of Oregon during Mitchell's second term in the United States Senate.

== Political career ==
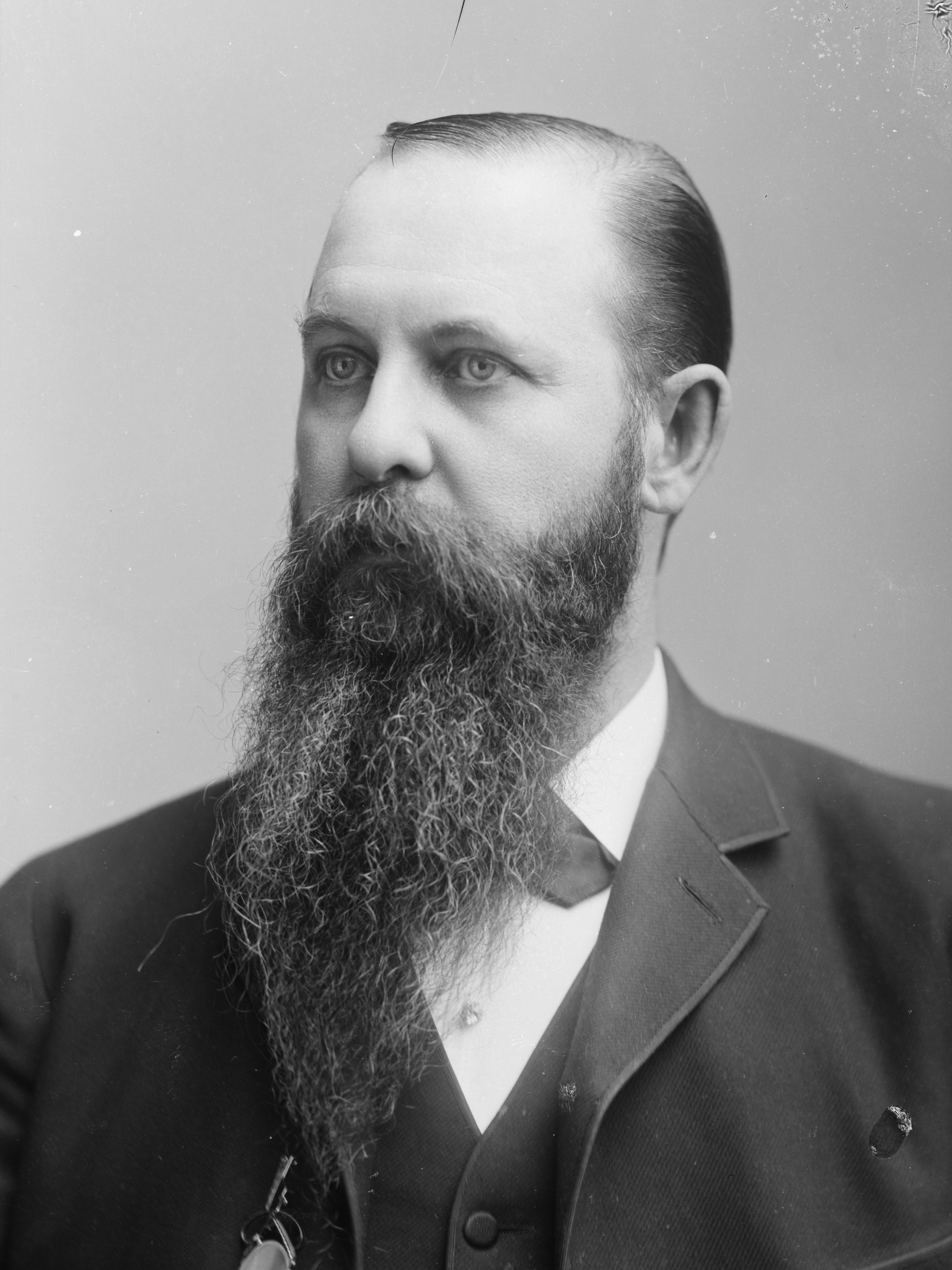
Mitchell circa 1873 to 1890.

Two years after arriving in Oregon, in 1862, he was elected to the Oregon State Senate. In 1864 he became the State Senate's President and served in that position until 1866. Because United States Senators were elected by the state legislatures during his lifetime, and that was the only office that Mitchell was to seek, this early position in the state Senate was the only popularly elected office for which he would ever run.

Mitchell was an unsuccessful candidate for the United States Senate from Oregon in 1866, losing to Henry W. Corbett. He tried again in 1872 and this time won, taking office in 1873. He petitioned to officially change his name after he was elected. A corruption inquiry resulted from his Senate election campaign. Mitchell escaped further investigation by bribing the Attorney General at the time, George Henry Williams.

By this time, he had married again, but had not divorced the adolescent student he had married when he was a schoolteacher in Pennsylvania. His opponents tried to block him from the Senate by asking a Senate committee to expel him for bigamy, desertion, and living under an assumed name. Though these charges were certainly true, the Senate Committee decided they were not relevant. Mitchell served in the Senate from 1873 to 1879, and was defeated for reelection. He ran for reelection to the Senate in 1882 but lost. In 1885, however, he was elected again to the Senate, and reelected in 1890.

During Mitchell's second period of Senate service, he was one of three United States Senators named "John Mitchell." From November 18, 1885, to March 3, 1887, Mitchell served alongside Sen. John I. Mitchell from Pennsylvania; and from March 4, 1893, to March 3, 1897, Mitchell served alongside Sen. John L. Mitchell from Wisconsin.

Mitchell sought reelection by the Oregon Legislature yet again in 1897, but his candidacy proved to be highly divisive; the resulting scandal prevented the 19th Oregon Legislative Assembly from organizing and, consequently, left Oregon with a vacant U.S. Senate seat for nearly two years. Joseph Simon was ultimately chosen for the seat.

Mitchell was devoted to business interests and was against the Populists and their political reforms. In the Senate, he was interested in transportation issues. He was chairman of the committee on railroads from 1877 to 1879 and from 1889 to 1893, and chairman of several committees related to coastlines and the ocean, specifically the Committee on Coast Defenses (from 1901 to 1903) and the Committee on Interoceanic Canals (from 1904 to 1905), and also the Committee on Transportation Routes to the Seaboard (from 1876 to 1877) when it was still a Select Committee (prior to becoming a Standing Committee), during his terms in the Senate. He was also chairman of the committee on claims from 1891 to 1893 and chairman of the committee of elections and privileges from 1895 to 1897.

Between Senate terms, Mitchell practiced law. Mitchell's last term in the Senate began in 1901 and was to last until 1907, but he died before it expired.

In 1905, Mitchell was indicted in the Oregon land fraud scandal, involving his use of political influence in the federal government to help clients with their land claims. He was convicted. An appeal of the conviction was under way and the Senate was beginning proceedings to expel him when Mitchell died of an illness in Portland, Oregon.

He was buried at River View Cemetery in Portland.

== Legacy and family ==
The town of Mitchell, Oregon was named after him.

His role in Pennoyer v. Neff, is typically taught to first-year law students in federal civil procedure courses.

Mitchell had two daughters with his first wife, Sadie Hoon: Jessie B. Mitchell (later Chapman) and Jennie M. Mitchell (later Fawcett).

He had six more children with his second wife, Mattie Price: Mattie Elizabeth Mitchell (later De La Rochefoucauld), Margaret "Maggie" Mitchell (later Griffin), Martha Mitchell, John H. Mitchell Jr., Hiram Everett Mitchell, and two other children who died in childhood.

Jennie married Jacob P. Fawcett, judge and mayor of Mount Union, Ohio (later Alliance). Mattie Elizabeth married François XVI Alfred Gaston, 5th Duc de La Rochefoucauld, Duc de Liancourt, Prince de Marcillac, Duc d'Anville, in 1892, making her a French duchess. Maggie Griffin died at age 41 from shock following a surgical procedure in New York City.

== See also ==
- List of American federal politicians convicted of crimes
- List of federal political scandals in the United States
- List of members of the United States Congress who died in office (1900–1949)
- List of United States senators expelled or censured

U.S. Senate
Preceded by Henry W. Corbett	U.S. Senator (Class 3) from Oregon; 1873–1879; Served alongside: James K. Kelly, La Fayette Grover	Succeeded by James H. Slater
Preceded by Joseph R. West	Chair of the Senate Railroads Committee; 1877–1879	Succeeded by Matt Ransom
Preceded by James H. Slater	U.S. Senator (Class 3) from Oregon; 1885–1897; Served alongside: Joseph N. Dolph, George W. McBride	Succeeded by Joseph Simon
Preceded by Nelson W. Aldrich	Chair of the Senate Railroads Committee; 1887–1889	Succeeded by Matthew Quay
Preceded by Dwight M. Sabin	Chair of the Senate Railroads Committee; 1889–1891	Succeeded by Lyman R. Casey
Preceded by John Spooner	Chair of the Senate Claims Committee; 1889–1891	Succeeded by Samuel Pasco
Preceded by George Gray	Chair of the Senate Claims Committee; 1895–1897	Succeeded by George Hoar
Preceded by George W. McBride	U.S. Senator (Class 2) from Oregon; 1901–1905; Served alongside: Joseph Simon, Charles Fulton	Succeeded by John M. Gearin
Preceded by George W. McBride	Chair of the Senate Coast Defenses Committee; 1901–1905	Succeeded by Philander C. Knox
Preceded by John Morgan	Chair of the Senate Interoceanic Canals Committee; 1905	Succeeded by Joseph Millard
