= Jonathan Bourne Jr. =

American politician (1855–1940)

Jonathan Bourne
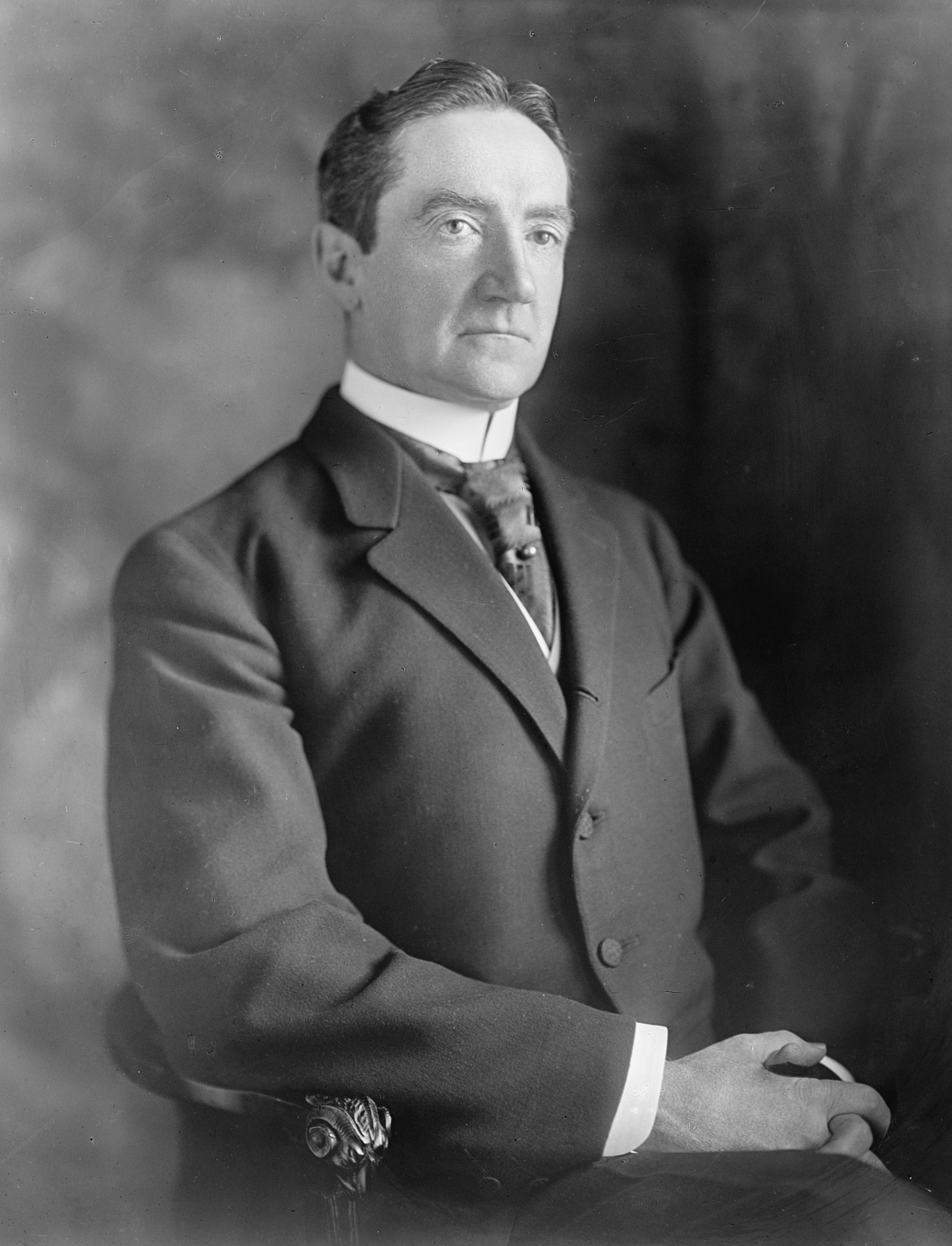

United States Senator from Oregon
- In office March 4, 1907 – March 3, 1913
- Preceded by: Frederick W. Mulkey
- Succeeded by: Harry Lane

Member of the Oregon House of Representatives
- In office 1885–1886; 1897
- Constituency: Multnomah County

Personal details
- Born: February 23, 1855 New Bedford, Massachusetts
- Died: September 1, 1940 (aged 85) Washington, D.C.
- Party: Republican
- Profession: attorney

Jonathan Bourne Jr. (February 23, 1855 – September 1, 1940) was an American politician, attorney, and businessman. A native of Massachusetts, he moved to Portland, Oregon, where he became a lawyer and an industrialist with holdings in mining, mills, and agriculture. As a Republican he served two terms in the Oregon House of Representatives and was elected the United States senator from Oregon.

== Early life ==
Jonathan Bourne was born on February 23, 1855, in New Bedford, Massachusetts. He was educated at private schools before enrolling at Harvard University where he attended from 1875 to 1877. Bourne then sailed for Asia where his ship wrecked off of the island of what was then called Formosa in 1877. After rescue, he arrived in Portland, Oregon, in 1878. He studied law there and was admitted to the bar in 1881, and then practiced in Portland from 1881 to 1886. An industrialist, he had interests in mining, farming, cotton mills, and commercial enterprises. Bourne was married three times.

== Political career ==
Bourne was a member of the Oregon House of Representatives from 1885 to 1886, representing Multnomah County. He returned to the House in 1897, representing District 37 and Multnomah County as a Republican, and only served during the regular session that failed to organize that year.

In 1906, he was elected as a Republican to the U.S. Senate, becoming one of the first two senators to be elected under Oregon's direct primary law, in which senators were selected by popular vote, and then were officially elected to the position by the Oregon Legislative Assembly to comply with Article One of the U.S. Constitution. (In 1914, the 17th Amendment established direct election of senators.) He served from March 4, 1907, to March 3, 1913.

While in the Senate he was chairman of the Committee on Fisheries (Sixtieth and Sixty-first Congresses) and chairman of the Committee on Post Offices and Post Roads (Sixty-second Congress). He was the author of the Parcel Post Act while there and advocated for the adoption of the initiative and referendum system. He was also a leading advocate for the direct primary system for elected offices.

In 1908, he was a leader in the group that attempted to have Theodore Roosevelt run for a third term as president; Roosevelt refused. In 1911-1912 Bourne served as president of the National Republican Progressive League. He organized the Republican Publicity Association in 1912. Bourne was not renominated to his Senate seat in 1912 by the Republican Party, but ran instead under the "Popular Government" banner, coming in third.

== Later life and legacy ==
After leaving Congress resumed his former pursuits in Oregon and Massachusetts. He then worked in the newspaper business in Washington, D.C. until his death. Jonathan Bourne died in the District of Columbia on September 1, 1940, at the age of 85. He was buried at Cedar Hill Cemetery in Maryland. Earlier in his life he owned large mining interests in the northeast part of Oregon, where the town of Bourne bore his name.

U.S. Senate
Preceded by Frederick W. Mulkey	U.S. Senator (Class 2) from Oregon; 1907–1913	Succeeded by Harry Lane
