= John M. Gearin =

American politician (1851–1930)

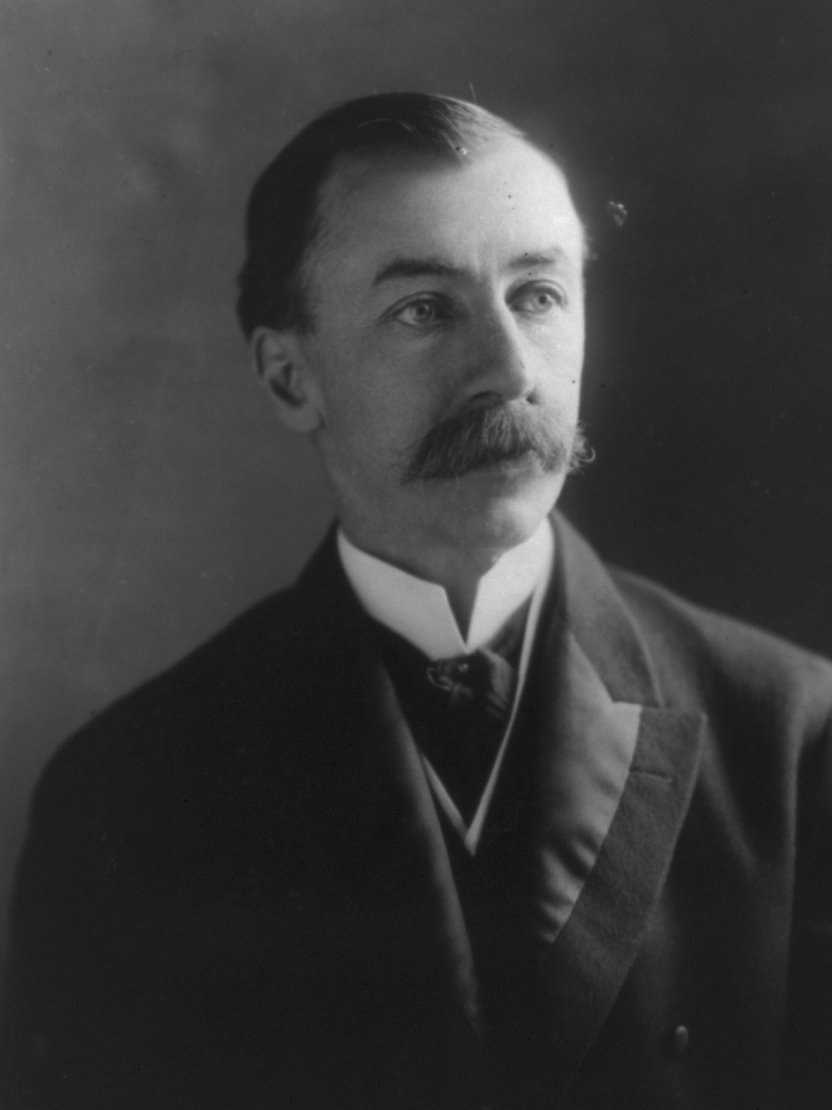
- Gearin in 1906

United States Senator from Oregon
- In office December 13, 1905 – January 23, 1907
- Appointed by: George Earle Chamberlain
- Preceded by: John H. Mitchell
- Succeeded by: Frederick W. Mulkey

Personal details
- Born: August 15, 1851 Pendleton, Oregon
- Died: November 12, 1930 (aged 79) Portland, Oregon, U.S.
- Party: Democratic
- Spouse: Matilda Raleigh
- Profession: attorney

John McDermeid Gearin (August 15, 1851 – November 12, 1930) was an American politician and attorney from the state of Oregon. A native of the eastern portion of the state, he represented Portland on the western side of the state in the Oregon House of Representatives. Originally an independent politician, he later became a Democrat and lost an election to serve in the United States Congress before winning appointment to the Senate in 1905. He also was Portland's city attorney and a district attorney.

== Early life ==
John Gearin was born on August 15, 1851, near Pendleton in Eastern Oregon. His parents, John and Ellen Burns Gearin, were from Ireland. After attending the local public schools, Gearin enrolled at St. Mary's College in San Francisco from 1863 to 1867. In 1871, he graduated with a bachelor of laws degree from the University of Notre Dame Law School. In 1873, he was admitted to the Oregon bar after studying law, and then entered private legal practice in Portland at what is now Miller Nash Graham & Dunn LLP. On June 28, 1878, Gearin married Matilda Raleigh. They had three children together.

== Political career ==
In 1874, he was elected to the Oregon House of Representatives and served in the 1874 legislative session. Gearin was elected as an independent to represent District 43 in Multnomah County. The next year he was city attorney of Portland. He was an unsuccessful Democratic candidate for election in 1878 to the Forty-sixth Congress, and was district attorney for Multnomah County from 1884 to 1886.

Gearin was appointed by U.S. President Grover Cleveland in 1893 as special prosecutor for the government concerning cases of opium fraud. He was then appointed to the United States Senate by Oregon Governor George Earle Chamberlain to fill the vacancy caused by the death of sitting Senator John H. Mitchell in 1905. Gearin served from December 13, 1905, until January 23, 1907, and was not a candidate for election in 1907 to fill the vacancy.

== Later years ==
After leaving the Senate he returned to his law practice in Portland. John Gearin died on November 12, 1930, at the age of 79 in Portland. He was buried in that city at the Mount Calvary Cemetery. He had been a member of the Knights of Columbus.

U.S. Senate
Preceded by John H. Mitchell	U.S. senator (Class 2) from Oregon; 1905–1907; Served alongside: Charles W. Fulton	Succeeded by Frederick W. Mulkey
