= Berry Botanic Garden =

Former botanical garden in Portland, Oregon, United States

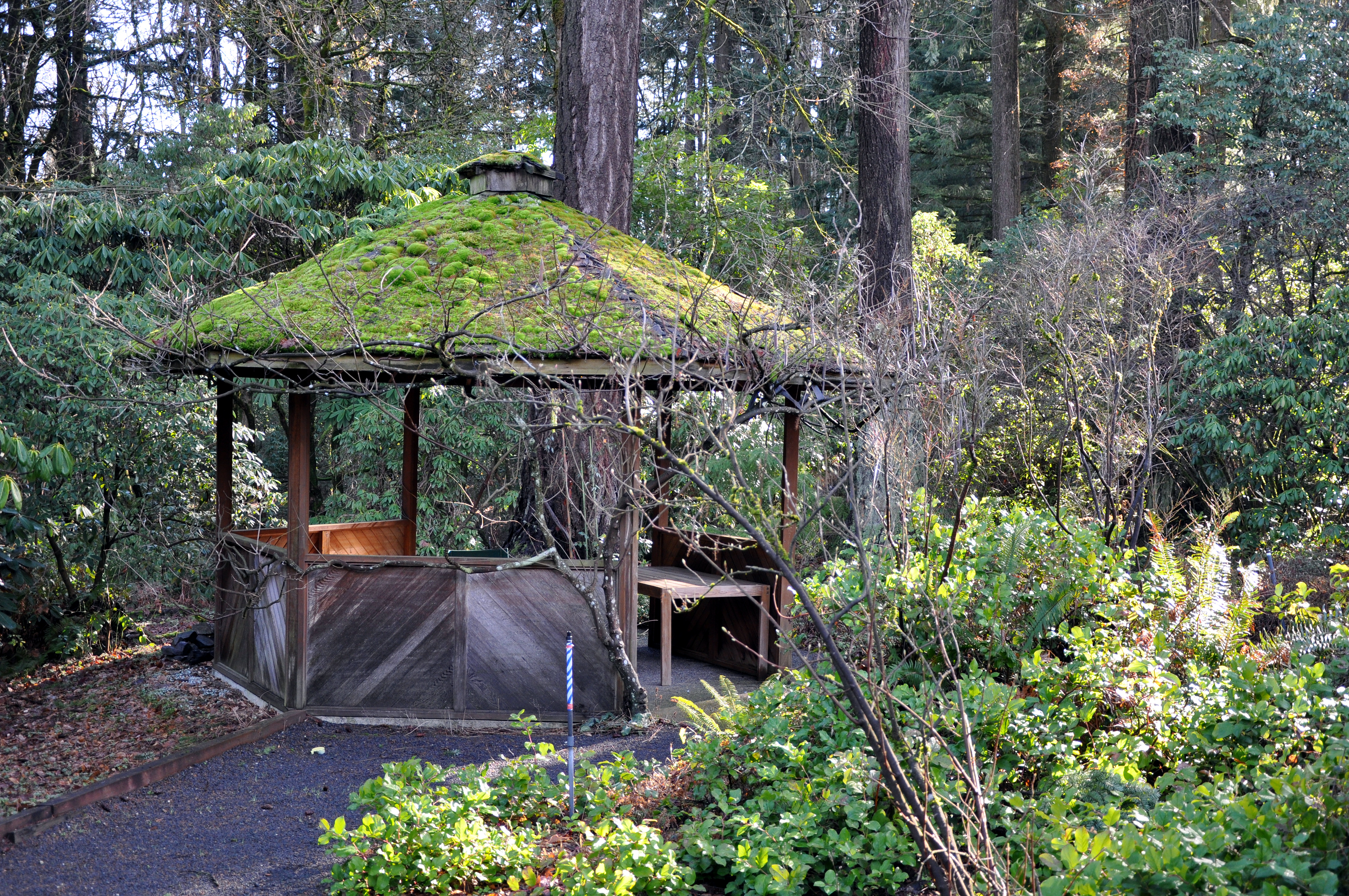
- Gazebo in the woods
- Interactive map of Berry Botanic Garden
- Type: Botanical
- Location: Portland, Oregon, United States
- Coordinates: 45.442380°N 122.661900°W
- Area: 6.5 acres (26,000 m^{2})
- Opened: 1930s
- Operator: The Friends of Berry Botanic Garden
- Status: Closed
- Collections: Primroses; Alpine & subalpine Rhododendrons; Pacific Northwest
- Website: berrybot.org
- Rae Selling Berry Garden and House
- U.S. National Register of Historic Places
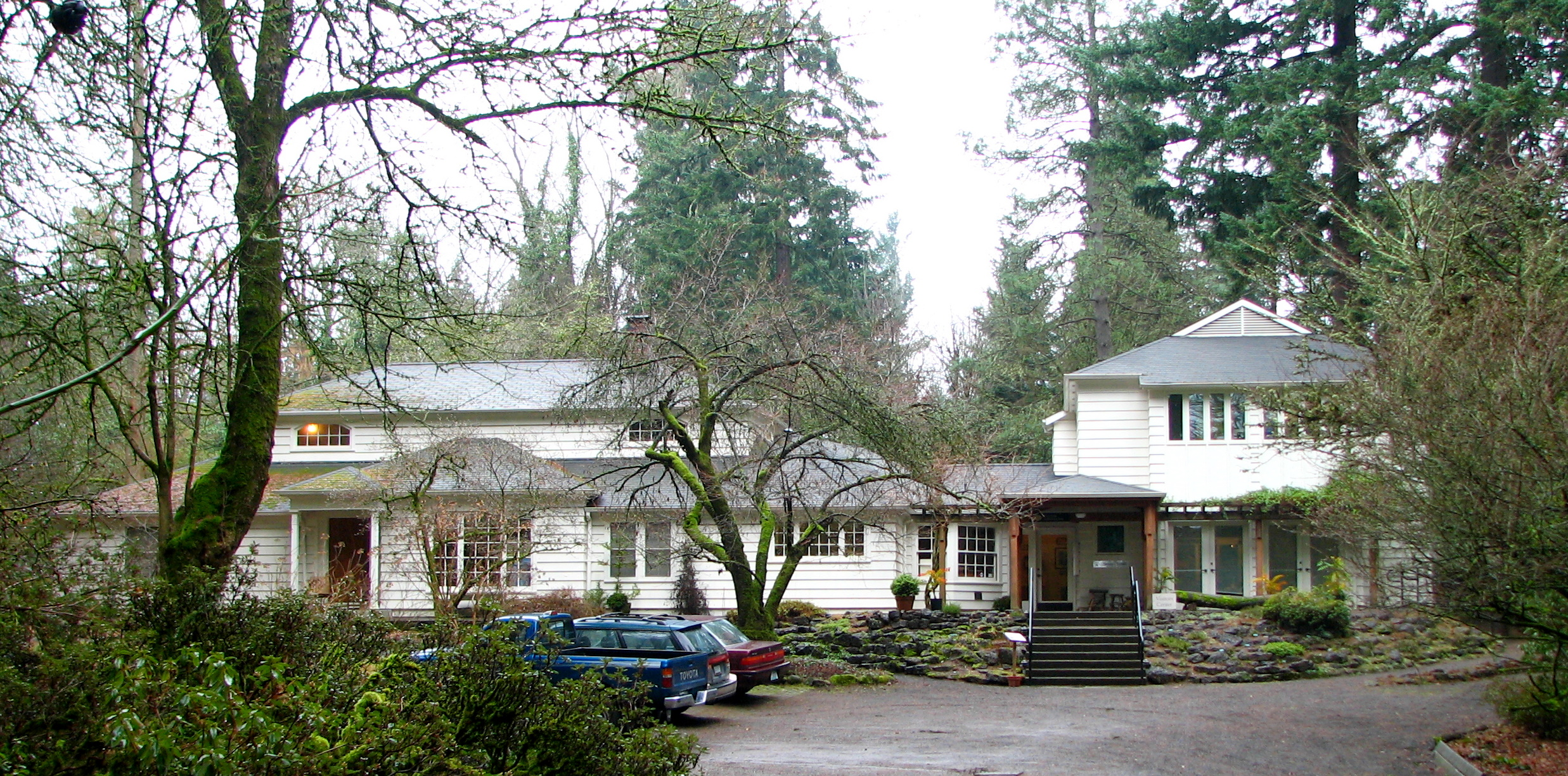
- Built: 1939
- Architect: Reuben T. Sinex (house) and John Grant (landscape near house)
- NRHP reference No.: 02001637
- Added to NRHP: December 31, 2002

Berry Botanic Garden was a botanical garden in southwest Portland, Oregon, in the United States. In addition to large collections of alpine plants, rhododendrons, primulas, and lilies, it was known for its plant-conservation program and its large seed bank that protects rare or endangered plants of the Pacific Northwest. The seed bank, formally established in 1983, was thought to be the first in the U.S. that was devoted entirely to preserving rare native plants.

The garden, created in the 1930s by Portland resident Rae Selling Berry, was bought after her death in 1976 by The Friends of Berry Botanic Garden, a nonprofit corporation. Managed by a board of directors, the Berry estate had an area of 6.5 acres (26,000 m^{2}), and contained the largest public rock garden on the West Coast.

In January 2010, The Berry Botanic Garden Board of Directors announced plans to sell the property and close the garden because of funding problems. The property was sold in February 2011, and in November 2011 the BBG conservation program and seed bank, now known as the Rae Selling Berry Seed Bank & Plant Conservation Program, completed the transfer to the Environmental Science and Management Program at Portland State University.

== History ==
The garden began in the 1930s as the personal collection of Rae Selling Berry (1881–1976), who obtained seeds from plant explorers including Frank Kingdon-Ward, Francis Ludlow and George Sherriff, and Joseph Rock. She also collected alpine plants herself from the mountains of the Western United States, British Columbia, and Alaska. In 1938 she established the garden's current site, and the garden became a public, nonprofit organization in 1978. She had a two-story Bungalow style home built at the location in 1939, which was designed by Reuben T. Sinex.

Berry, the daughter of Ben Selling and Mathilda Hess, grew up in Portland and married Alfred Berry, a contractor who became the superintendent of Portland International Airport. For more than 30 years, the couple and their three children lived in northeast Portland's Irvington neighborhood, where Berry developed an interest in plants. Reading about plant expeditions to Europe and Asia, she began to provide financial support for the expeditions and through them to obtain seeds. By the mid-1930s, Berry had run out of room for her plants in Irvington, and the couple moved to "a bowl-shaped site nestled near the top of a hill". The property, just north of Lake Oswego, included springs and creeks, a ravine, a meadow, and a cattail marsh, and was partly covered with second-growth Douglas-fir.

In developing the garden, Berry focused on "exceptional plants", particularly rhododendrons, primulas, and alpines. In 1964, the Garden Club of America awarded her the Florens de Bevoise Medal for her knowledge of plants. In 1965, she won the American Rhododendron Society's first Award of Excellence given to a woman, and she was honored for her work by the American Rock Garden Society. Berry continued to expand her collection past the age of 80, taking field trips in search of Oregon's only primrose, Primula cusickiana (Cusick's Primrose). At age 90, she was still planting seeds in the gardens, and died at home at age 96.

In 1978, two years after Berry's death, The Friends of The Berry Botanic Garden, a nonprofit corporation, bought the estate. Donations to a $300,000 fund drive to make the purchase possible included $10,000 from the Stanley Smith Horticultural Trust in Scotland as well as support from plant societies, the American Rhododendron Society, and the Oregon branch of The Nature Conservancy. The Friends stated mission was "to preserve, maintain, disseminate, study and add appropriate plant material to the collections."

By 1983, the discovery that 39 native species in the garden were rare or endangered species led to the creation of the Seed Bank for Rare and Endangered Species of the Pacific Northwest. This was thought to be the first seed bank in the U.S. devoted entirely to preserving rare native plants. The seed bank consists of more than 14,000 accessions (packages of seed) from more than 300 rare or endangered plants of the Pacific Northwest.

The garden and home at the garden were added to the National Register of Historic Places in December 2002 as the Rae Selling Berry Garden and House. In January 2010, The Friends, citing financial problems, decided to sell the garden but to preserve the conservation program with help from Portland State University (PSU).

== Collections ==
External videos
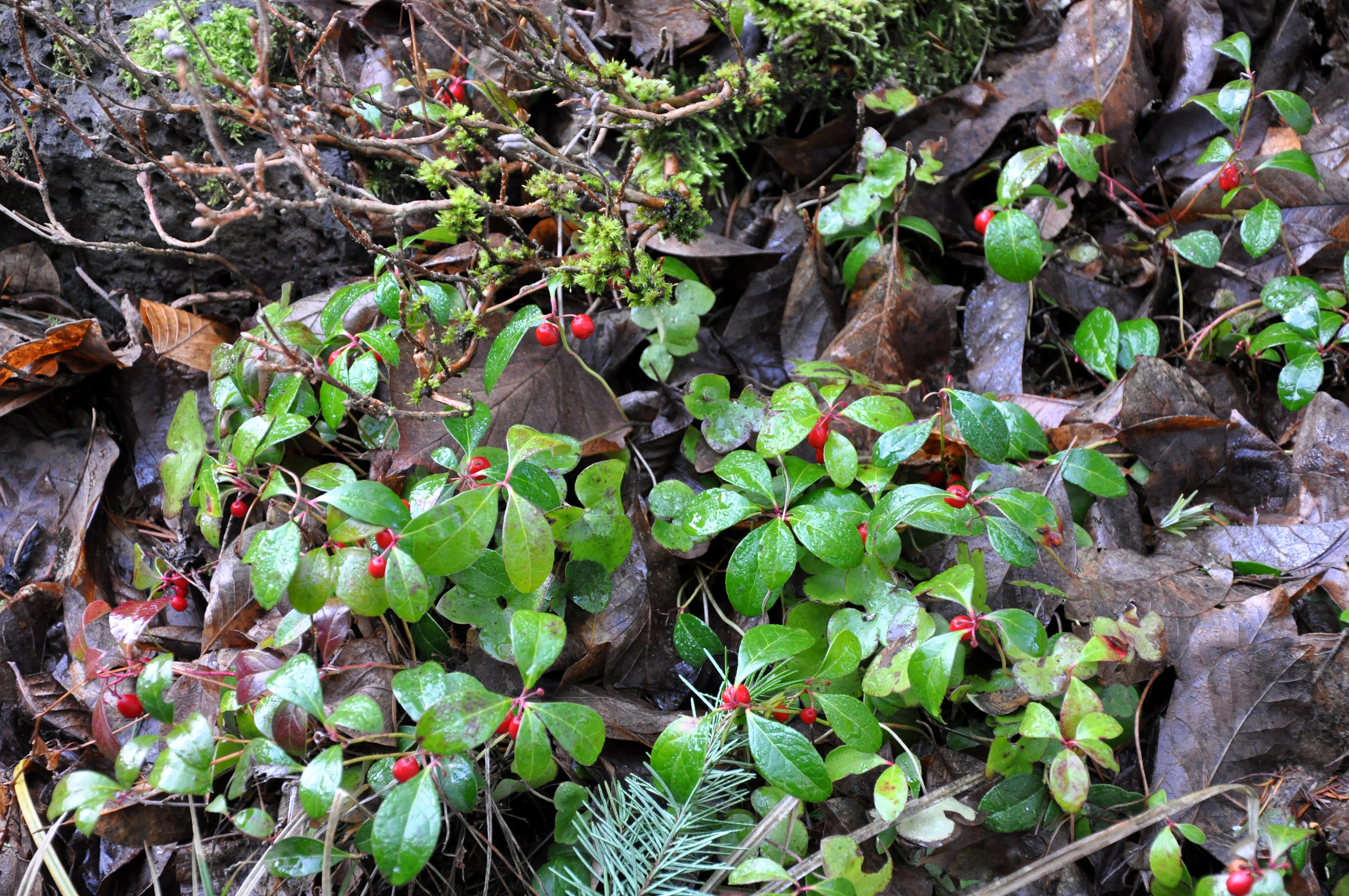
- "Berry Botanic Garden" (Video), Brief overview of the garden, collections, and seed bank.

The garden continued to develop after it became a nonprofit organization. Its major collections included primulas (commonly called primroses), many of which started from seeds from Asian plant expeditions augmented by international seed exchanges. Primroses are found mainly in mountainous parts of the Northern Hemisphere. Berry produced several varieties of her own including "Snow Lady" and "Purple Spark".

Another major collection consisted of high-mountain alpine and subalpine plants. Keeping the most delicate specimens in cold frames or in log beds behind the house, Berry expanded her collection through exchanges with other gardeners, her own expeditions, and from plant explorers in Asia. The log-bed section of the garden gave way after 1980 to a rock garden with an alpine bog. Insiders' Guide to Portland calls it "the largest public rock garden on the West Coast".

Rhododendrons made up a third major collection. Many of the seeds, acquired from plant explorers in Asia, began their lives on the Berry family's prior home in Irvington and were transplanted to the garden. Berry's collection grew to include more than 2,000 specimens representing 160 species. Dwarf species grew in the rock garden, and two species, R. decorum and R. calophytum, formed a forest of more than 150 mature plants.

Native plants from the Pacific Northwest comprised a fourth major collection, which included about 200 of the roughly 5,000 native plants in the region. These plants were found in all parts of the garden, especially along a native-plant trail, in the rock garden, and in the water garden.

Lilies made up a fifth major collection started in 1979 when the garden's board of directors decided to provide sanctuary for many species of the genus Lilium found in the wild in the Northwest and along the West Coast. The lilies were stored as seed or planted in suitable locations throughout the garden.

== See also ==
- List of botanical gardens in the United States
