= Ascreavie =

Country house and estate in Scotland

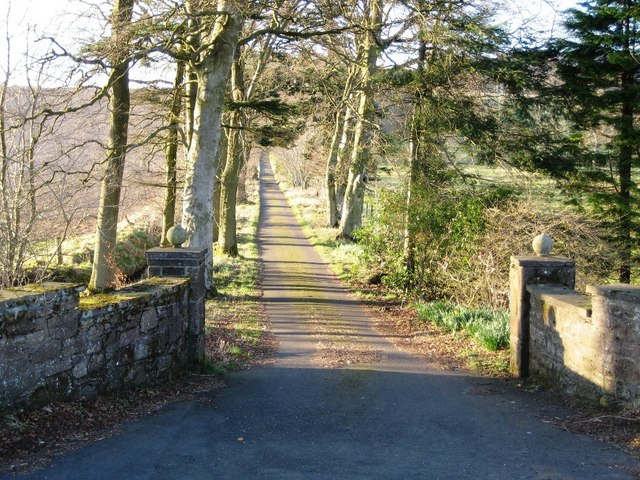
- Entrance to Ascreavie

- Location within Angus
- 56.702627°N 3.090914°W
- Location: Kirkton of Kingoldrum, Angus, Scotland
- OS grid reference: NO333573

Site notes
- Architect: William Scott

Ascreavie is a country house in Angus, Scotland. It is located 2 kilometres (1.2 mi) north of Kirkton of Kingoldrum, and 6 kilometres (3.7 mi) north-west of Kirriemuir. The farms of Over Ascreavie and Nether Ascreavie lie close by. In 1987 the gardens at Ascreavie were added on the Inventory of Gardens and Designed Landscapes in Scotland for its important horticultural collection, gathered by the plant-hunter George Sherriff. They were removed from the inventory in 2017.

== History ==
In 1540 the lands of Ascreavie were sold, along with Balfour and Kirkton of Kingoldrum, by Arbroath Abbey to James Ogilvy of Cookston and his wife Marjory Durie. In 1699 John Ogilvy of Balfour sold the Ascreavies to James Ogilvy, third son of Donald Ogilvy who formerly had been the tenant farmer of Nether Ascreavie. The Ogilvy of Ascreavie family continued until the death of James Catherine Ogilvy in 1871. Her son William Baird Young then inherited the title of Ascreavie. Author J. M. Barrie’s grandfather, Alexander Ogilvy, was born at Over Ascreavie in 1788.

A new house was built on the estate in the 1850s, to designs by the Dundee architect William Scott. The Youngs lived there until the 1940s when it was purchased by the circus-owning family of Bertram Mills. The house was then sold on in 1949 to Major George Sherriff (1898–1967). Major Sherriff had undertaken a number of plant collecting expeditions with Frank Ludlow in the Himalayas in the 1930s. At Ascreavie he and his wife began to develop the gardens using plants which he had gathered on these expeditions, including many rare rhododendrons. Since Sherriff's death, the plant collection has been maintained, and a number of specimens have been donated to botanic gardens in Dundee and Edinburgh.
