= British Mission in Lhasa =

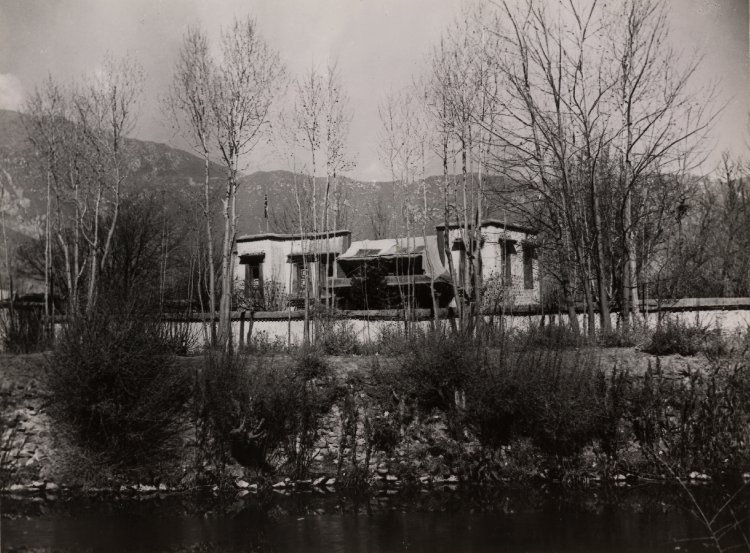
- The embassy building
- Address: Dekyi Lingka, Tibet
- Coordinates: 29°39′N 91°06′E
- Opened: August 1936
- Closed: September 1952

British Mission in Lhasa was the British Indian Office in Tibet, located at Dekyi Lingka, Lhasa. It was established in August 1936, with the first Officer in Charge being Hugh Richardson. After the Indian Independence in October 1947, the mission was restructured as the Indian Mission in Lhasa, with Richardson continue serving as the Officer in Charge, until August 1950 (just before the Chinese People's Liberation Army entered Tibet).

== History ==
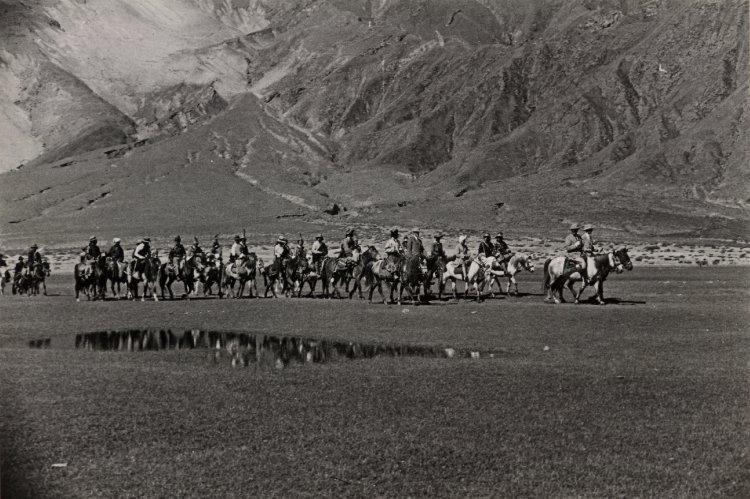
The British Mission arriving in Lhasa escorted by an official reception party, August 1936

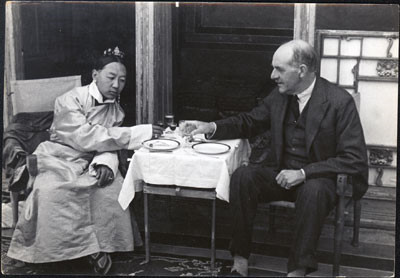
Kashag official Serling Langton Gunga Wangchuk and Basil Gould had lunch together at Dekyi Lingka, 1936

In 1934, The Nationalist Government of China ordered Huang Musong as the head of a delegation to Tibet to pay tribute to the deceased 13th Dalai Lama, leaving two officers and a radio, highly regarded by the Tibetan government. To counter the influence of Huang's delegation, in August 1936, Basil Gould led a British mission to Lhasa, the delegation included his private secretary, Spencer Chapman, British Army Brigadier General Philip Neame, two British Royal Signals telegraphists, a military doctor and the then Gyantse Trade delegation Hugh Richardson.

The mission negotiated with the Tibetan government about the possibility of the 9th Panchen Lama returning to Tibet. Gould also discussed British military assistance to Lhasa. On September 7, 1936, Gould and Brigadier Philip Neame inspected a military drill conducted by the Tibetan troops stationed at Lhasa's Drapchi Prison.

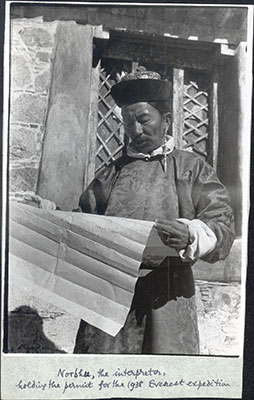
Norbu Tenzin read out the passports(Lamyig) for the Everest Expedition team,1937

On January 1, 1937, the British mission hosted a banquet for the Tibetan Regent, Reting Rinpoche, and the four Kalons of the Kashag. As New Year's gifts, they presented the mission with passports for the 1938 British Everest Expedition.

On February 17, 1937, Gould led the mission in leaving Lhasa but left behind Hugh Richardson, Norbu Tenzin, and a radio station. Hugh became the officer in charge of the British Mission in Lhasa and maintained communication with the UK through the radio station. The mission was under the jurisdiction of British Political Officer in Sikkim, and its legal status was deliberately kept ambiguous and its establishment did not lead to Britain officially recognizing Tibetan independence.

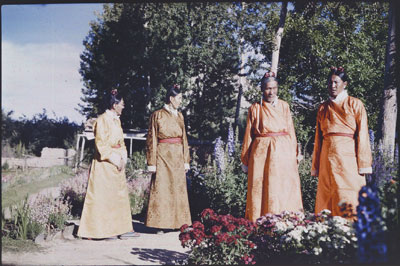
Four officials of the Kashag in the garden of the mission

After its establishment, the British mission became the center of relations between the UK and Tibet. The members of the mission, experienced in Tibetan affairs, built strong relationships with various groups in Lhasa through their expertise and interests. Meanwhile, the originally important Gyantse Trade Agency was reduced to a supply station for the Lhasa mission.

On November 30, 1943, a C-87 transport aircraft, flying over the Hump, became lost and ran out of fuel. The five American crew members parachuted and landed near Tsetang in Tibet. After reaching Lhasa, they stayed at the British mission for several days before leaving on December 20 for India.

In 1943, Hugh and the Assistant Governor of Sikkim, Megassino, suggested to the Kashag that Tibetan teenagers should learn English to enable Tibet to act independently in political, military, and industrial matters. The Kashag, recognizing the need for English-educated officials, accepted their proposal. In January 1944, the Kashag asked the British mission to find a headmaster for an English school. When the headmaster arrived in Lhasa, he and Richardson designed the school's campus. The Kashag approved the plan and allocated 25,000 Tibetan silver and 700 Tibetan grams of Tibetan barley for construction. The site was chosen in the Lubu area of Lhasa.

Richardson also handed over a list of teaching materials and supplies that the headmaster had brought for purchase. The school's opening ceremony was held on July 31 in a temporary building at the Chongdrelinka Villa. Zhiben Gaxue Qugjinima and Tsepon Shakabpa represented the Kashag at the ceremony. However, the school faced strong opposition from the monasteries, and in January 1945, the Foreign Affairs Bureau informed the British mission that the school had been closed.

In April 1946, officer in charge of the mission, Hugh, provided the Tibetan government with intelligence about the Tibetan Improvement Party plotting to overthrow the Tibetan government. He also provided evidence implicating Banda Raga as the mastermind. As a result, the Tibetan government took action against the party. At the request of the Tibetan government, India extradited Banda Raga and Tuden Gongpo to China.

After India gained independence in August 1947, the members of the Lhasa mission were replaced by Indians. However, since no Indian official could replace Richardson, he continued in his role until August 1950. Sumul Sinha from the Indian Ministry of External Affairs took over as head of the mission until September 1952, when the mission was downgraded.

In 1952, Zhou Enlai, Premier of the State Council of the People's Republic of China, suggested to India that the Indian mission in Lhasa be normalized and downgraded to a consulate, in exchange for India establishing a consulate in Mumbai. On September 16, 1952, the Indian Ministry of External Affairs announced that the Indian mission in Lhasa would be downgraded to a consulate, subordinate to the Indian Embassy in Beijing, thereby officially recognizing Tibet as part of China.

== List of Heads of the British Mission in Lhasa ==
- Hugh Richardson: August 1936–October 1939
- Norbu Tenzin: October 1939–April 21, 1942
- Frank Ludlow: April 21, 1942–April 1943
- George Sherif: 1943–1945
- Pemba Tsering: 1945–1946
- Hugh Richardson: 1946–August 1950 (After India's independence in 1947, hugh became head of the Indian mission in Lhasa)
- Sumul Sinha: October 1950–September 1952

== The Mission Building ==
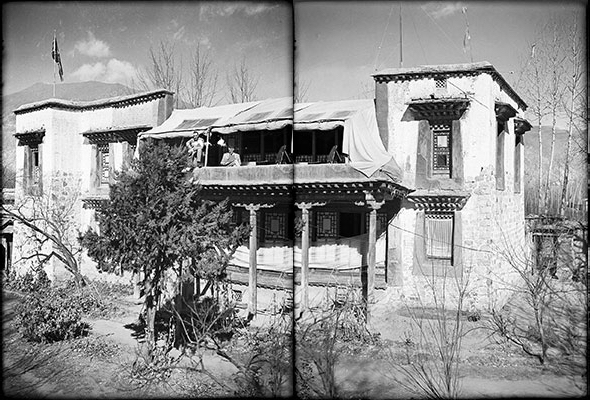
The building in 1936

Starting with Charles Alfred Bell, British officials in Lhasa resided in Dekyi Lingka. The main building was a two-story, typical Tibetan-style flat-roofed structure, built around a central courtyard. Outbuildings included a stable, kitchen, and servants' quarters.

In February 1939, Basil Gould, the then British Political Officer in Sikkim, conveyed to the British Indian government the necessity of expanding the mission's quarters, making the British mission in Lhasa a permanent establishment. In November of the same year, he again requested approval for this, and the Indian government eventually granted it. Around June 1940, a Western-style hospital was designed by the British and funded by Tibet for the mission. In 1942, a living room was added to the facility. In 1943, Tibet officially allowed the mission to build a hospital and a school.

== Bibliography ==
- Arpi, Claude (2004). Born in Sin: The Panchsheel Agreement : the Sacrifice of Tibet. Mittal Publications. ISBN 978-81-7099-974-4.
- Goldstein, Melvyn (1991). A History of Modern Tibet, 1913-1951: The Demise of the Lamaist State. University of California Press. ISBN 978-0-520-91176-5. Archived from the original on 2019-02-03.
- Harrer, Heinrich (2009). Seven Years in Tibet. Penguin Publishing Group. ISBN 978-1-101-13556-3.
- Lamb, Alastair (1989). Tibet, China & India, 1914-1950: a history of imperial diplomacy. Roxford Books. ISBN 978-0-907129-03-5.
- Marshall, Julie (2004-11-23). Britain and Tibet 1765-1947: A Select Annotated Bibliography of British Relations with Tibet and the Himalayan States including Nepal, Sikkim and Bhutan Revised and Updated to 2003. Routledge. ISBN 978-1-134-32785-0.
- McKay, Alex (1997). Tibet and the British Raj: The Frontier Cadre, 1904-1947. Psychology Press. ISBN 978-0-7007-0627-3.
- Bill Peters (2001). "Hugh Richardson, CIE, OBE". Asian Affairs. 32 (2): 252–253. doi:10.1080/714041444.
- Williamson, Margaret; Snelling, John (1987). Memoirs of a Political Officer's Wife in Tibet, Sikkim and Bhutan. Wisdom Publications. ISBN 978-0861710560. Archived from the original (PDF) on 2019-06-06.
- Wang, Jiawei (1997). 中国西藏的历史地位. 五洲传播出版社. ISBN 978-7-80113-303-8. Archived from the original on 2018-08-23.
- Zhu, Lishuang (2016). 民國政府的西藏專使(1912–1949). 香港中文大學出版社. ISBN 978-962-996-711-6.
- Lhalu, Tsewang Dorje (2000). "拉萨英语学校破产记". 《中国西藏》 (2期). Archived from the original on 2018-06-28.
- Hu, Yan (2001). "《柳升祺先生谈所谓的英国"驻藏办事机构"──从黎吉生的去世说起》". 《中国西藏》 (3期). Archived from the original on 2018-06-26.
- Xu, Baiyong (2006). "民国时期英国驻拉萨代表团的设置及其活动". 《中国藏学》 (4期). Archived from the original on 2019-08-24.
- Sun, Zihe (1989). 《西藏硏究論集》. 臺灣商務印書館. ISBN 978-957-05-0007-3.
- 张永攀 (2002). "中印日玛线、印藏驮运线与英国的干涉活动". 《西藏民族学院学报》 (第1期). Archived from the original on 2013-06-18.
- Richard, Starks (2013). Lost in Tibet: The Untold Story of Five American Airmen, a Downed Plane, and the Will to Survive.
- 劉學銚 (2013-10-10). 《從歷史看清西藏問題－揭開達賴的真實面貌》. 思行文化. ISBN 978-986-89955-7-4.
