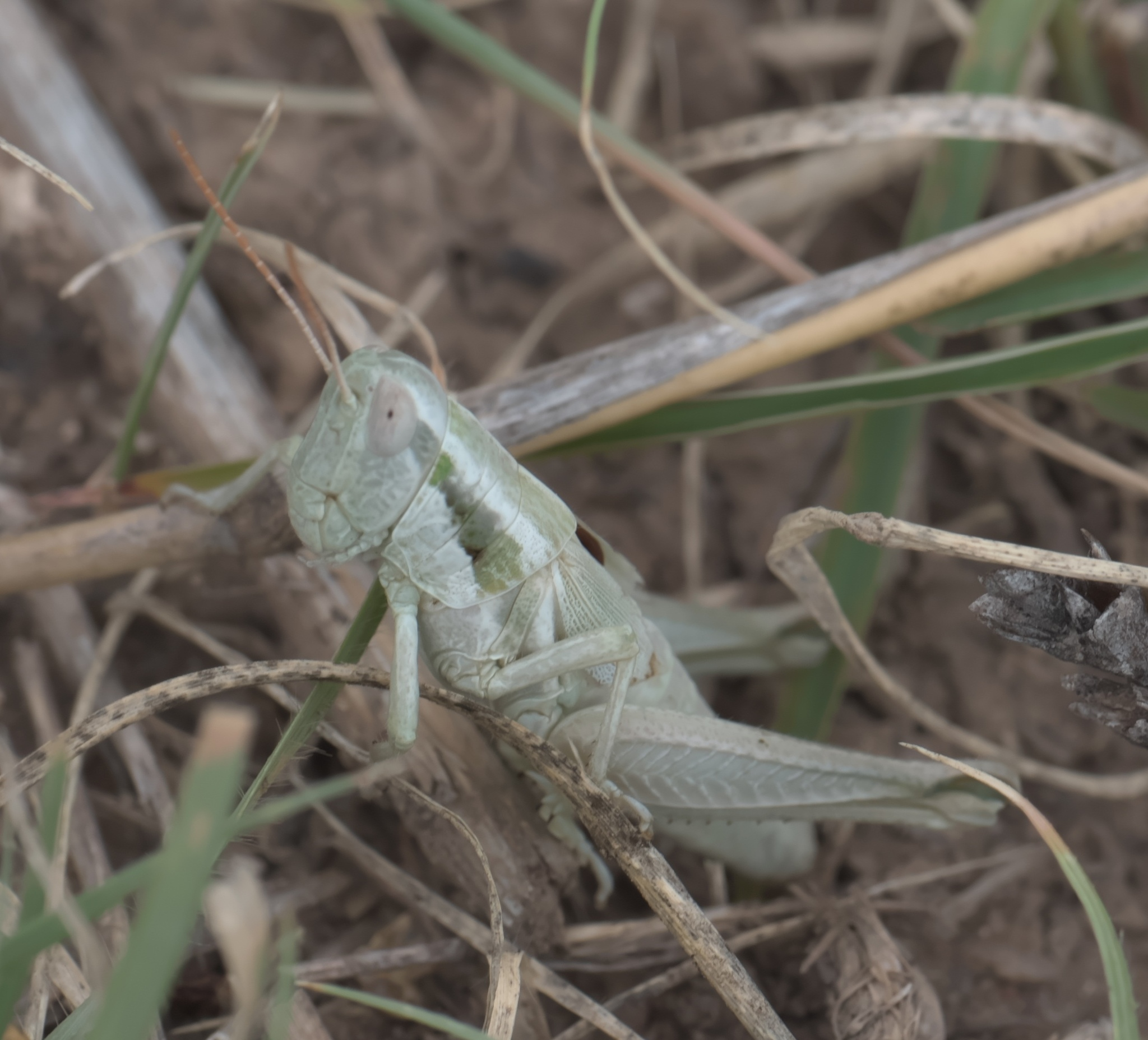
- Hypochlora alba, mugwort grasshopper, Kansas, USA

Scientific classification
- Kingdom: Animalia
- Phylum: Arthropoda
- Class: Insecta
- Order: Orthoptera
- Suborder: Caelifera
- Family: Acrididae
- Subfamily: Melanoplinae
- Tribe: Melanoplini
- Genus: Hypochlora
- Species: H. alba

Binomial name
- Hypochlora alba (Dodge, 1876)

= Hypochlora alba =

Species of spur-throated grasshopper

Hypochlora alba, known generally as mugwort grasshopper, is a species of spur-throated grasshopper in the family Acrididae. Other common names include the sage grasshopper and cudweed grasshopper. It is found in North America. It feeds exclusively on Artemisia ludoviciana.
