= Dorothy Renton =

Scottish gardener (1898–1966)

- Born: Dorothy Graham Robertson; 7 April 1898; Perth, Scotland
- Died: 28 January 1966 (aged 67); Perth, Scotland
- Occupations: garden creator and plant collector
- Known for: creating Branklyn Garden in Perth
- Spouse: John Renton

Dorothy Graham Renton (7 April 1898 – 28 January 1966) was a Scottish gardener noted for creating Branklyn Garden in Perth with her husband John. She took the Veitch Memorial Medal for her work in 1954 from the Royal Horticultural Society. Branklyn was described as "the finest two acres of private garden in the country". It is owned by the National Trust for Scotland.

== Birth and gardening life ==
Renton was born in Perth in 1898. Her parents were Robina (born Conacher) and William Robertson, a medical practitioner. On 11 September 1922 she married John Taylor Renton (1891–1967), a chartered land agent, in Edinburgh, where she grew up.

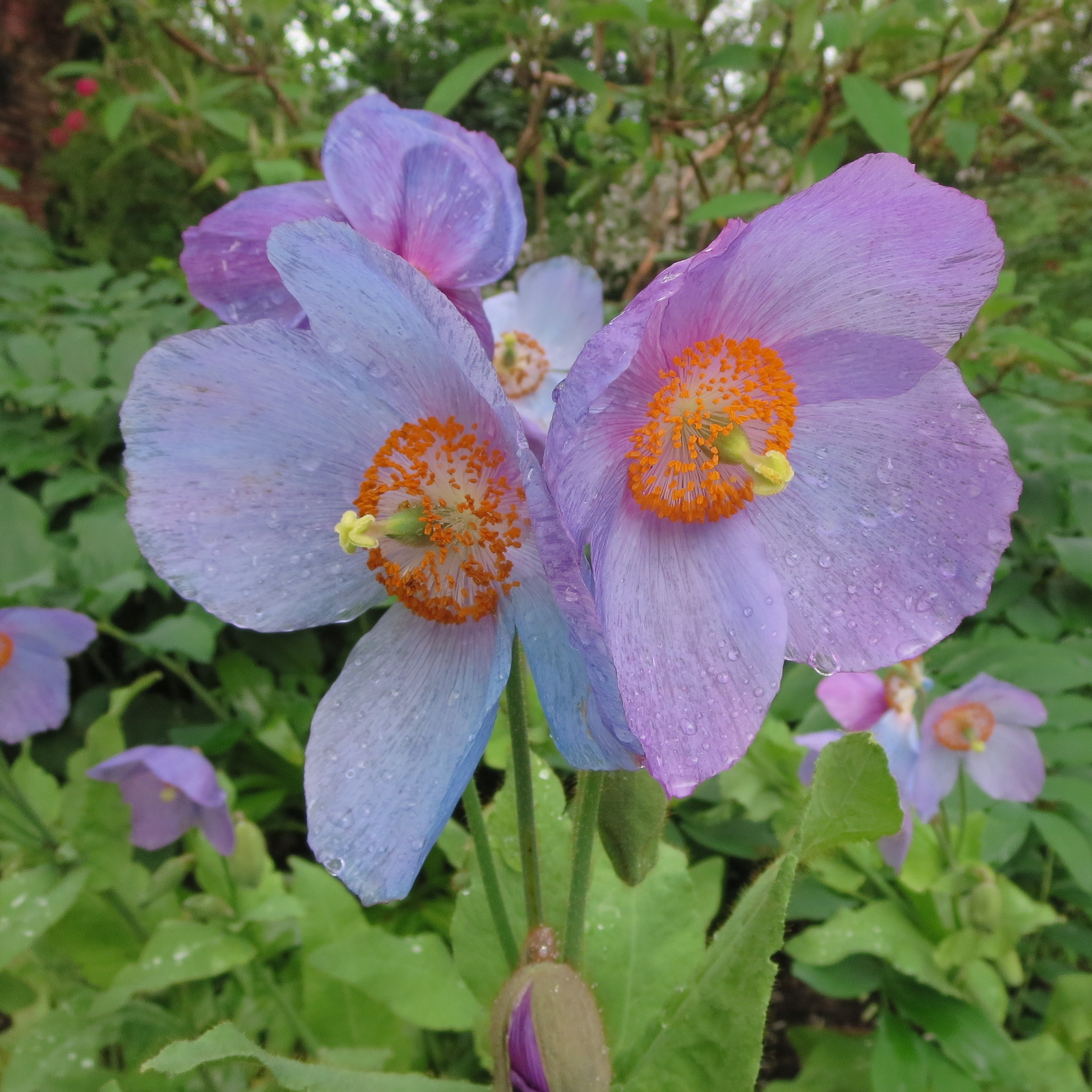
Meconopsis 'Dorothy Renton'

They bought two acres of land known as Barnhill Orchard, which was the land for their new house. The land was in walking distance of the centre of Perth on the lower banks of Kinnoull Hill. The new arts and crafts house was called Branklyn and in the former orchard they laid out their gardens. The gardens were remarkable because they used unusual Asian seeds which were native to Tibet, Bhutan and China. The seeds were sourced from Lhasa-based naturalist Frank Ludlow, the Scottish botanist George Forrest, English explorer Frank Kingdon-Ward, and other plant collectors. Her husband took the lead on the design and layout, but it was Dorothy who was the skilled botanist and horticulturist.

In 1925 they first created their three rock gardens. Rock was quarried from nearby and transported to their garden by traction engine before being moved to the new rock gardens by crowbars. In 1934 the couple were awarded the Forrest medal by the Scottish Rock Garden Club for the first time. In 1936 the garden won again and Dorothy received 112 packets of new seeds from one expedition. They won the medal again in the following year and in 1950. In 1954 the Royal Horticultural Society awarded their Veitch memorial medal to her in recognition of her work introducing new plants. The Regius Keeper of the Royal Botanic Garden Edinburgh described their creation as "the finest two acres of private garden in the country".

The Rentons were founding members of the Alpine Garden Society and the Scottish Rock Garden Club.

== Death and legacy ==
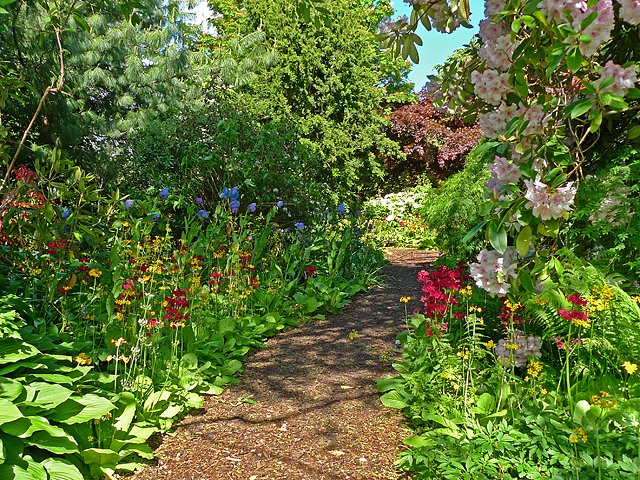
Branklyn Garden in bloom

Renton died on 28 January 1966, aged 67, and her husband died in 1967, after which the house went into national ownership. Besides the gardens the couple left their detailed notebooks which they had made during their management of Branklyn. The gardens are made available to visitors by the National Trust for Scotland, but the house is still private. The garden is known for its dog's tooth violets, magnolias, Japanese maples and a katsura tree. There are estimated to be 3,500 different types of plant, which includes the national collections of Himalayan blue poppies, at Branklyn.
