= Scottish Rock Garden Club =

The Scottish Rock Garden Club (SRGC) was founded in Edinburgh in 1933 to promote the cultivation of alpine and rock garden plants by Dorothy Renton, Roland Edgar Cooper and others. The SRGC has meetings, conferences and talks, it publishes a journal and it organises seed exchanges.

The registered charity has members in 38 countries. The SRGC is the largest Scottish horticultural society.

== Founding members ==
- Roland Edgar Cooper was an Edinburgh-based botanist and curator of the Royal Botanic Garden Edinburgh.
- William Gregor MacKenzie went on to become curator of the Chelsea Physic Garden and was made honorary life president of the SRGC in 1994.
- Dorothy Renton and John Taylor Renton, horticulturalists responsible for the Branklyn Garden in Perth.
