= Artemisia microcephala =

Artemisia microcephala may refer to two different species of plants:

- Artemisia microcephala Hillebr., a taxonomic synonym for Oʻahu wormwood (Artemisia australis)
- Artemisia microcephala Wooton, a taxonomic synonym for silver wormwood (Artemisia ludoviciana)
