= Artemisia revoluta =

Artemisia revoluta may refer to two different species of plants:

- Artemisia revoluta Edgew., a taxonomic synonym for Artemisia roxburghiana
- Artemisia revoluta Rydb., a taxonomic synonym for silver wormwood (Artemisia ludoviciana)
