= Basil Gould =

British diplomat (1883–1956)

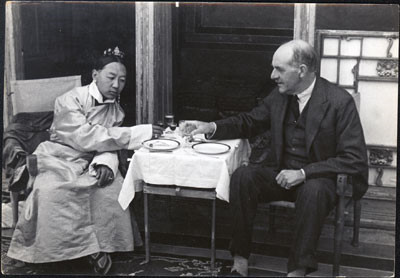
Basil Gould and the Tibetan Prime Minister–Lonchen Langdun–sitting in the British Political Officer's residence called Dekyi Lingka

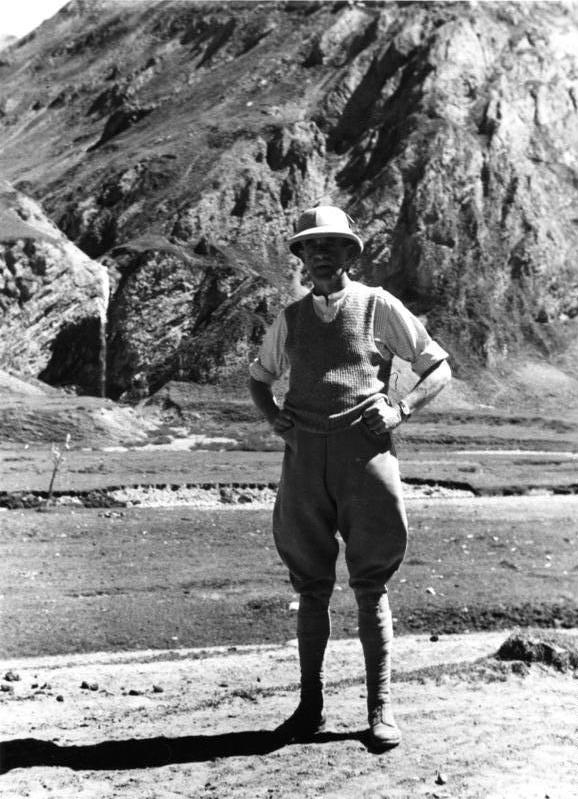
Basil Gould as photographed by Ernst Schäfer in 1938.

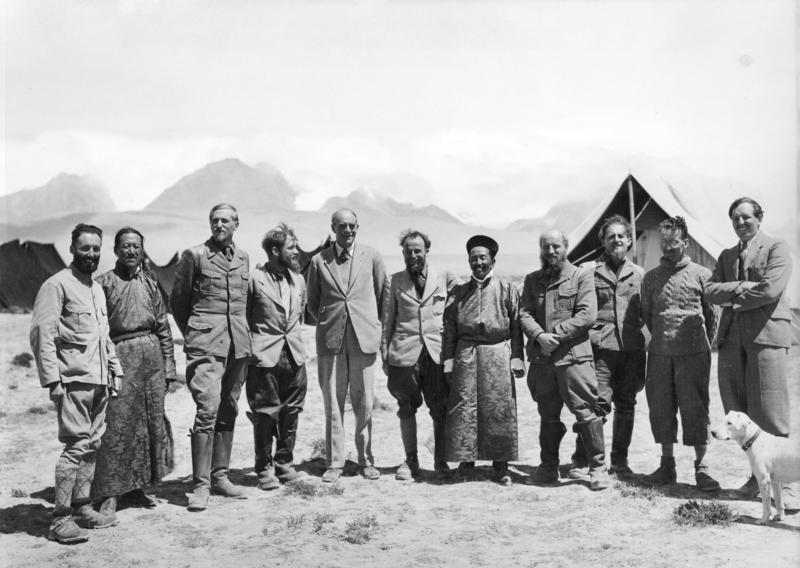
Basil Gould with Ernst Schäfer-German expedition to Tibet in 1938.

Sir Basil John Gould, CMG, CIE (29 December 1883 – 27 December 1956) was a British Political Officer in Sikkim, Bhutan and Tibet from 1935 to 1945.

== Biography ==
Known as "B.J.", Gould was born in Worcester Park, Surrey, to Charles and Mary Ellen Gould. He was educated at Winchester College and Oxford University. He joined the Indian Civil Service in 1907.

Gould was a British Trade Agent in Gyantse, Tibet from 1912 to 1913. In 1912, the 13th Dalai Lama asked that some "energetic and clever sons of respectable families" should be given "world-class educations at Oxford College, London". The Indian government decided that Gould, who was about to go on leave back to England, should guide the four young boys (known as the "Four Rugby Boys") on their journey to the United Kingdom and assist them during their first few weeks in England in April 1913.

Gould married Lorraine Macdonald Kebbell (1898–1935) when back in England on leave from India on 14 September 1921. They had two sons.

In 1926 Gould was posted to the British Legation in Kabul, Afghanistan. He was subsequently assigned to Kurrum, Malakand and Waziristan and finally in 1933 to Baluchistan. His wife Lorraine died in Baluchistan in 1935.

In August 1936, Gould led a delegation to Lhasa to negotiate with the Tibetan government on the possibility of the 9th Panchen Lama's return to Tibet. Gould also discussed British military aid to Lhasa. Gould inquired about the creation of a British office in Lhasa, but the Tibetan government rejected this. Gould eventually departed Lhasa, but left behind his commercial representative, Hugh Richardson, who had been previously stationed in Gyantse. Richardson was equipped with a radio so Richardson could maintain contact with the British.

Gould married his second wife Cecily, the daughter of Colonel C. H. Brent-Good, of Yarmouth on the Isle of Wight. Gould had one son with Cecily. Gould made some amateur films in Tibet in 1936–41 which are preserved by the British Film Institute.

In 1940, Gould attended the installation ceremonies of the 14th Dalai Lama in Lhasa, Tibet. Gould brought a gift of a Meccano set for the young Tenzin Gyatso. In 1941, Gould was knighted by King George VI. In 1945, the British Mission under Gould helped to start a school in Lhasa, but it was soon closed under pressure from Tibetan religious authorities.

He died in Yarmouth in 1956, two days before his 76th birthday.

== Publications ==
- The jewel in the lotus: Recollections of an Indian political, Basil John Gould, Chatto & Windus, 1957.
- Tibetan language records, Basil Gould, Tharchin, 1949.
- Tibetan Word Book, Sir Basil Gould, C.M.G., C.I.E., and Hugh Edward Richardson, Oxford University Press, 1943.
- Report on the Discovery, Recognition and Installation of the Fourteenth Dalai Lama, B. J. Gould, New Delhi, 1941.
- The Discovery of the Fourteenth Dalai Lama, B. J. Gould, The Geographical Magazine, volume 19, October 1946, p. 246–258.
