= Hypochlora =

Scientific classification
- Domain: Eukaryota
- Kingdom: Animalia
- Phylum: Arthropoda
- Class: Insecta
- Order: Orthoptera
- Suborder: Caelifera
- Family: Acrididae
- Subfamily: Melanoplinae
- Tribe: Melanoplini
- Genus: Hypochlora; Brunner, 1863
- Species: H. alba

Binomial name
- Hypochlora alba (Dodge, 1876)

Genus of grasshoppers

Hypochlora is a genus of spur-throated grasshoppers in the family Acrididae. There is one described species in Hypochlora, Hypochlora alba.
