= Brian Mathew =

British botanist

Brian Frederick Mathew
- Born: 1936 (age 89–90); Limpsfield, Surrey, England
- Known for: Contributions to horticulture and taxonomy, particularly in regard to bulbs (geophytes)
- Scientific career
- Fields: Botany, Horticulture
- Author abbrev. (botany): B.Mathew

Brian Frederick Mathew MBE, VMH is a British botanist, born in the village of Limpsfield, Surrey, England. His particular area of expertise is bulbous plants, particularly ornamental bulbous plants, although he has contributed to other fields of taxonomy and horticulture. He has authored or co-authored many books on bulbs and bulbous genera which appeal to both botanists and gardeners, as well as specialist monographs on other genera, including Daphne (with Chris Brickell), Lewisia, and Helleborus. His work has been recognized by the British Royal Horticultural Society and the International Bulb Society.

== Biography ==
Brian Mathew was born in Limpsfield, a village in Surrey, England. His parents encouraged both Brian and his sister to look after small garden plots allocated to them. He records that as his father was a very successful vegetable gardener, his own interests were more in ornamental plants. An early encounter with Helleborus orientalis may have laid the foundations for a later monograph on hellebores.

He was educated at the local grammar school. After leaving school he spent his compulsory military service in the Royal Air Force, engaged in a then secret project involving Britain's atomic bomb. When his service was finished, a family friend and enthusiastic gardener suggested he should attend the horticultural school run by the Royal Horticultural Society at Wisley. Entry required three years prior work experience. Through the offices of the family friend he was taken on at the nearby Birch Farm Hardy Plant Nursery, run by the Ingwersen family.

Having acquired the necessary work experience, he moved on to the RHS horticultural school. At the time the rock garden was cared for by Ken Aslet, well known to alpine garden enthusiasts, and botany was taught by Chris Brickell, with whom Mathew later collaborated. He met his wife, Margaret Briggs, at this time; she was Brickell's secretary.

In 1963, using a Bowles Scholarship travel grant, he organized a five-month plant hunting expedition to Iran. Many bulbs were collected, the areas visited being particularly notable for Crocus, Fritillaria and Iris. Subsequent trips to Turkey and the Balkans also focussed on bulbs, but also hellebores. These expeditions convinced Mathew that his interests lay more in botany than horticulture, and he found employment in the herbarium at the Royal Botanic Gardens, Kew. Initially, he worked in the tropical African section, but soon moved to the newly formed petaloid monocot section. His subsequent career at Kew was largely based on this group of plants, particularly the families Iridaceae, Liliaceae sensu lato and Amaryllidaceae.

In 1973, he published the first of his many books on bulbs or bulbous genera, Dwarf Bulbs. He has written that "[w]ith my combined interest in horticulture and taxonomy, I have tried to pitch my publications at a level which will to some extent appeal to a wide audience in both fields." Dwarf Bulbs was followed in 1978 by The Larger Bulbs, and a revision of the former work was published as The Smaller Bulbs in 1987. Between 1973 and 1992, he was the author or co-author of nine books on bulbs generally. In addition, he produced monographs of the genera Daphne (with Chris Brickell), Iris, Crocus, Lewisia, and Helleborus in addition to contributing accounts of various families or genera to at least nine different floras, and producing over 200 papers in botanical and horticultural journals.

In 1982, Mathew was awarded by The British Iris Society, the Foster Memorial Plaque (named after Sir Michael Foster).

He received two awards at the beginning of the 1990s for his scholarly and popular publications. In 1991, he was awarded the Victoria Medal of Honour, by the Royal Horticultural Society. In 1992, he was awarded the Herbert Medal by the International Bulb Society – only one recipient is honoured worldwide each year.

He continued to write, with some 13 authored or co-authored books published between 1993 and 2005, many on bulbs or bulbous genera, such as Lilies : a romantic history with a guide to cultivation (1993) or The Cyclamen of Turkey (2001, with Neriman Özhatay). More recently he contributed to a book on Epimedium (2002) and other herbaceous Berberidaceae and to one on the genus Sorbus (2005).

He was awarded an MBE in the 2005 New Year Honours.

== Awards and honours ==
- Victoria Medal of Honour (VMH), awarded by the Royal Horticultural Society, 1991
- Herbert Medal, awarded by the International Bulb Society, 1992
- MBE (Member of the Order of the British Empire), New Year Honours 2005

== Publications ==
=== Books ===
- Mathew, Brian (1973), Dwarf Bulbs, New York: Arco Pub. Co., ISBN 978-0-668-02964-3
- Marchant, Angela & Mathew, Brian (1974), An alphabetical table and cultivation guide to the species of the genus Iris, Kew, Surrey: British Iris Society, ISBN 978-0-901483-13-3
- Wendelbo, Per & Mathew, Brian (1975), Iridaceae, Graz: Akademische Druck- und Verlagsanstalt, ISBN 978-3-201-00728-3
- Mathew, Brian (1976), A gardener's guide to Hellebores, Alpine Garden Society, OCLC 255412599
- Brickell, Christopher & Mathew, Brian (1976), Daphne : the genus in the wild and in cultivation, Woking, England: Alpine Garden Society, ISBN 978-0-900048-23-4
- Mathew, Brian (1978), The Larger Bulbs, London: Batsford in association with the Royal Horticultural Society, ISBN 978-0-7134-1246-8
- Rix, Martyn; Phillips, Roger & Mathew, Brian (1981), The Bulb Book : a photographic guide to over 800 hardy bulbs, London: Pan, ISBN 978-0-330-26481-5
- Mathew, Brian (1981), The iris, New York: Universe Books, ISBN 978-0-87663-372-4
- Grey-Wilson, C.; Mathew, Brian & Blamey, Marjorie (1981), Bulbs : the bulbous plants of Europe and their allies, London: Collins, ISBN 978-0-00-219211-8
- Mathew, Brian (1982), The crocus : a revision of the genus Crocus (Iridaceae), London: B.T. Batsford, ISBN 978-0-7134-3390-6
- Redouté, Pierre & Mathew, Brian (1982), Lilies, and related flowers, Woodstock N.Y.: Overlook Press, ISBN 978-0-87951-135-7
- Baytop, Turhan & Mathew, Brian (1984), The bulbous plants of Turkey : an illustrated guide to the bulbous petaloid monocotyledons of Turkey : Amaryllidaceae, Iridaceae, Liliaceae, London: Batsford in association with the Alpine Garden Society, ISBN 978-0-7134-4517-6
- Mathew, Brian (1986), The year-round bulb garden, London: Souvenir Press, ISBN 978-0-285-62787-1
- Mathew, Brian (1987), The Smaller Bulbs, London: B.T. Batsford, ISBN 978-0-7134-4922-8
- Mathew, Brian (1987), Flowering bulbs for the garden, Kew, England: Royal Botanic Gardens Kew in association with Collingridge, ISBN 978-0-600-35175-7
- Phillips, Roger; Rix, Martyn & Mathew, Brian (1989), Bulbs, London: Pan Books, ISBN 978-0-330-30253-1 (revision of Rix, Phillips & Mathew 1981; also published in the US by Random House)
- Mathew, Brian (1989), The genus Lewisia, Royal Botanic Gardens, Kew in association with Christopher Helm and Timber Press, ISBN 978-0-88192-158-8
- Mathew, Brian (1989), Hellebores, Woking, England: Alpine Garden Society, ISBN 978-0-900048-50-0
- Mathew, Brian (1993), Lilies : a romantic history with a guide to cultivation, Philadelphia, Pa.: Running Press, ISBN 978-1-56138-304-7
- Burton, John; Knees, Sabina G; Read, Mike & Mathew, Brian (1994), CITES guide to plants in trade, Ruislip: Dept. of the Environment, OCLC 32015909
- Mathew, Brian & Swindells, Philip (1994), Gardener's guide to bulbs, London: Mitchell Beazley, ISBN 978-1-85732-178-4
- Mathew, Brian (1996), A review of Allium sect. Allium, Kew: Royal Botanic Gardens, Kew, ISBN 978-0-947643-93-5
- Mathew, Brian (1997), Growing bulbs : the complete practical guide, Portland, Or.: Timber Press, ISBN 978-0-88192-384-1
- Mathew, Brian (1998), Bulbs : the four seasons : a guide to selecting and growing bulbs all year round, London: Pavilion Books, ISBN 978-1-85793-504-2
- Davis, Aaron; McGough, Noel H.; Mathew, Brian & Grey-Wilson, Christopher (1999), CITES bulb checklist for the genera Cyclamen, Galanthus and Sternbergia, Kew: Royal Botanical Gardens, ISBN 978-1-900347-39-6
- Ali, S.I. & Mathew, Brian (2000), Flora of Pakistan : No. 202, Iridaceae, Karachi: Dept of Botany, Univ. of Karachi, OCLC 223631207
- Mathew, Brian & Özhatay, Neriman (2001), The cyclamen of Turkey : a guide to the species of cyclamen growing in Turkey, London: Cyclamen Society, ISBN 978-0-9537526-1-4
- Stearn, William T.; Green, P.S.; Mathew, Brian & Shaw, Julian M.H. (2002), The genus Epimedium and other herbaceous Berberidaceae, Portland, Or.: Timber Press, ISBN 978-0-88192-543-2
- Ward, Bobby & Mathew, Brian (2004), The plant hunter's garden : the new explorers and their discoveries, Portland, Or.: Timber Press, ISBN 978-0-88192-696-5
- Fielding, John; Turland, Nicholas J. & Mathew, Brian (2005), Flowers of Crete, Kew: Royal botanic gardens, ISBN 978-1-84246-079-5
- McAllister, Hugh; Hague, Josephine & Mathew, Brian (2005), The Genus Sorbus : Mountain Ash and other Rowans, Kew: Royal Botanic Gardens, ISBN 978-1-84246-088-7

=== Others ===
(Incomplete)

- Wang, Yinzheng; Gilbert, Michael G.; Mathew, Brian F.; Brickell, Christopher & Nevling, Lorin I., Daphne in Wu, Raven & Hong 1994
- Zhao, Yu-tang; Noltie, Henry J.; Mathew, Brian F.; Brickell, Christopher & Nevling, Lorin I., Iridaceae in Wu, Raven & Hong 1994
- Wang, Yinzheng; Gilbert, Michael G.; Mathew, Brian F.; Brickell, Christopher & Nevling, Lorin I., Thymeleaceae in Wu, Raven & Hong 1994

== References and bibliography ==
- Wu, Zhengyi; Raven, Peter H.; Hong, Deyuan (1994). Flora of China. Beijing [China], St. Louis: Science Press; Missouri Botanical Garden. OCLC 1091062033.
