= William Gregor MacKenzie =

Gardener and horticultural curator in the United Kingdom

- Born: 14 June 1904; Ballimore, Argyllshire, Scotland
- Died: 16 October 1995

William Gregor MacKenzie ALS VMH (1904–1995) was a gardener and horticultural curator born in Scotland, where his father was head gardener at Ballimore, near Loch Fyne in Argyllshire.

== Royal Botanic Garden Edinburgh ==
Aged 24, MacKenzie became a student at the Royal Botanic Garden Edinburgh. At the Botanic Garden, he was promoted to the position of Assistant Curator in charge of the Alpine and Herbaceous Department.

== Scottish Rock Garden Club ==
In 1933, he co-founded the Scottish Rock Garden Club and in 1994 he was made their honorary life president.

== Chelsea Physic Garden ==
MacKenzie accepted the prestigious post of curator at the Chelsea Physic Garden in 1946, where he remained until his retirement in 1973. Edward Augustus Bowles chaired the panel that selected MacKenzie as curator, where he initially restored the garden from wartime neglect and then reinvigorated it as a centre for horticulture

== Awards ==
In 1961, Bill MacKenzie was awarded the Victoria Medal of Honour by the Royal Horticultural Society.

== Plants ==
=== Gentiana ===
The Gentiana ‘Inverleith’ was bred by MacKenzie. It is an herbaceous perennial with trailing stems and has narrow, light green leaves and solitary, terminal, rich blue, funnel-shaped flowers with darker stripes on the outside.

=== Clematis ===
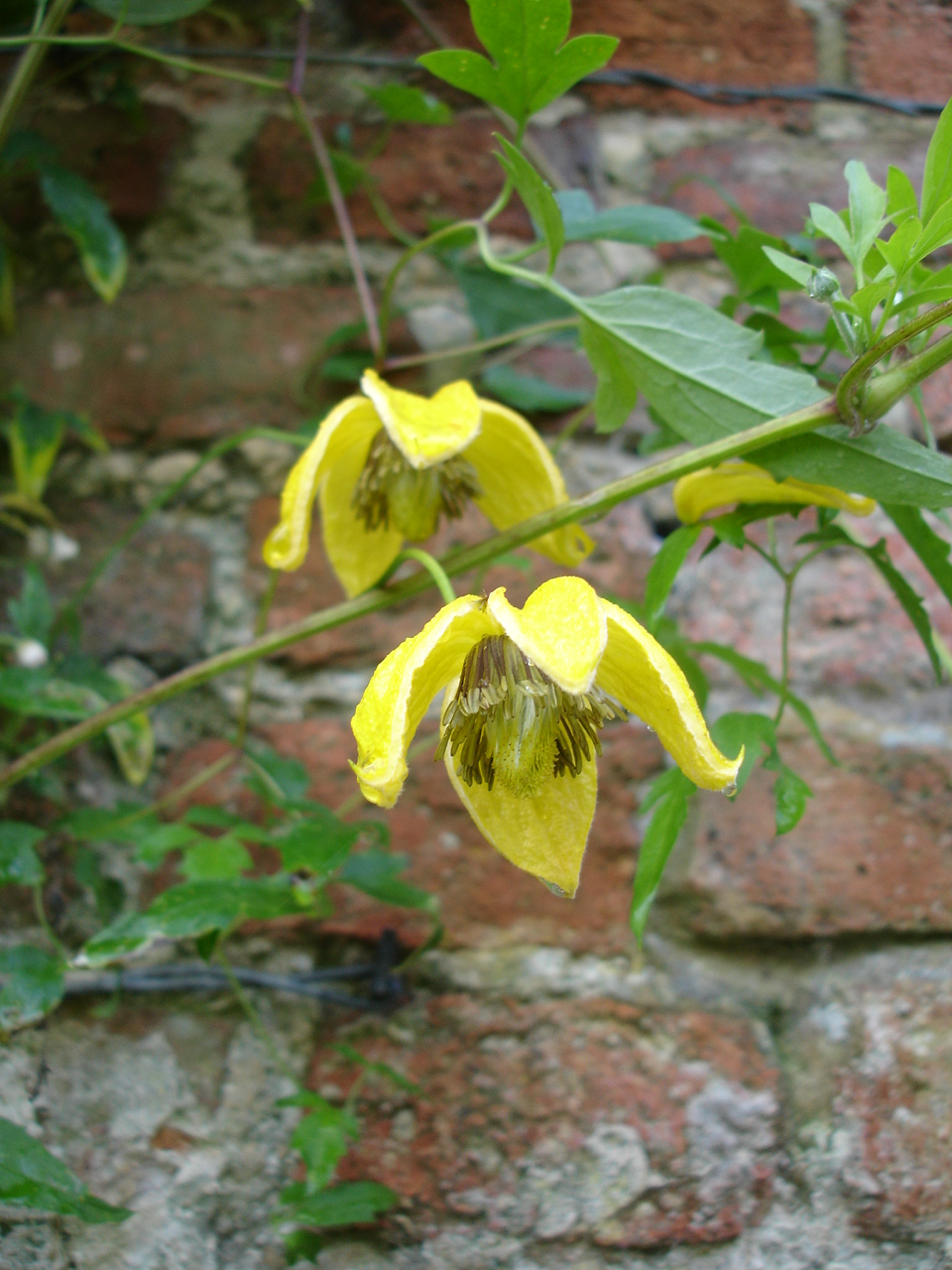
'Bill MacKenzie' clematis

The author and gardener Valerie Finnis, in her work as a plant breeder, developed a cross between an "orange-peel" clematis (C. orientalis and C. tangutica) at the Waterperry School of Horticulture in 1968 which she named for Bill MacKenzie. Finnis described him as her "great friend and mentor". On 7 September 1976, she showed the clematis at a Royal Horticultural Society Show where it won an Award of Merit.

Clematis ‘Bill MacKenzie' is a large, vigorous deciduous climber with finely-cut leaves. Its flowers are 6-7cm in width with four thick, spreading bright yellow sepals surrounding dark stamens from early to late summer. It has good silky seed-heads. Clematis ‘Bill MacKenzie’ has been awarded the RHS Award of Garden Merit.
