= Hugh Edward Richardson =

British diplomat and Tibetologist

Hugh Richardson CIE OBE FBA
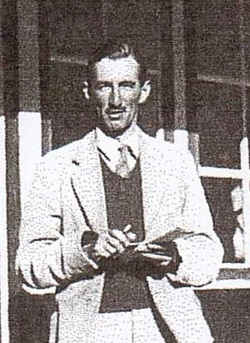
- Hugh Richardson, 1936, Tibet
- Born: 22 December 1905; St. Andrews
- Died: 3 December 2000 (aged 94)
- Occupations: Diplomat, tibetologist
- Spouse(s): Huldah Rennie, m. 1951
- Parent: Colonel Hugh Richardson
- Awards: Companion of the Order of the Indian Empire (CIE); Officer of the Order of the British Empire (OBE); Light of Truth Award; Honorary Fellow of the British Academy (FBA)

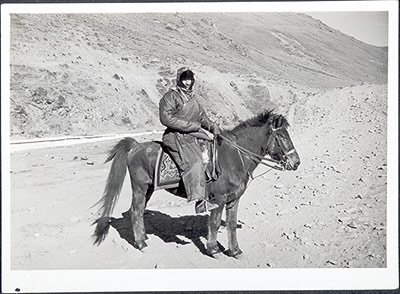
Hugh Richardson in Tibet 1940/ 1941 said, '"Maru the pony. A good one, my dear pony"

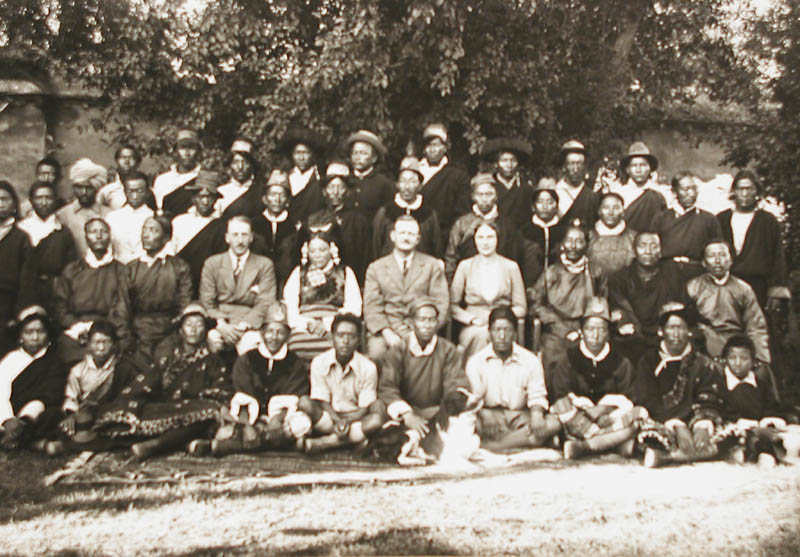
Tibetan friends gather at the British Residency in Lhasa called Dekyi Lingka, 9 September 1933

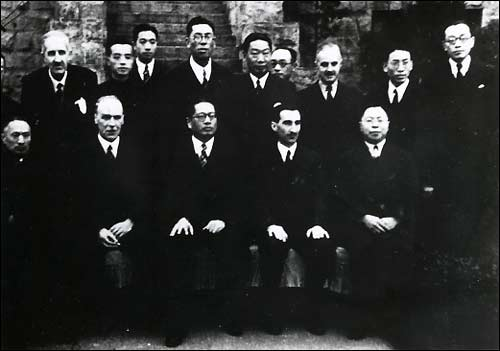
11 January 1943 signing of the Treaty Between His Majesty in Respect of the United Kingdom and India and His Excellency the President of the National Government of the Republic of China for the Relinquishment of Extra-Territorial Rights in China and the Regulation of Related Matters, became effective 20 May 1943. Front row (left to right): Wellington Koo, Horace James Seymour, T. V. Soong, Hugh Edward Richardson, Wu Guozhen

Hugh Edward Richardson CIE OBE FBA (22 December 1905 – 3 December 2000) was an Indian Civil Service officer, British diplomat and Tibetologist. His academic work focused on the history of the Tibetan empire, and in particular on epigraphy. He was among the last Europeans to have known Tibet and its society before the Chinese invasions which began in 1950.

== Biography and career ==
Born in St. Andrews, Fife, the son of a British Army medical officer, Richardson studied classics at Keble College, Oxford. He entered the Indian Civil Service on 9 October 1930. Transferring to the Foreign and Political Service of the Government of India, Richardson was posted to Baluchistan as an Assistant Political Agent. In July 1936, he was appointed as the British Trade Agent at Gyantse. He served as the Officer in Charge of the British Mission in Lhasa, capital of Tibet, from 1936 to 1940 and again from 1946 to 1950, in the final years having become the diplomatic representative of the recently independent India.

During this tenure, Richardson lobbied the Tibetan government (Kashag) to expel from Lhasa all ethnic Han Chinese. The expulsion order was carried out by the Tibetan Army on 8 July 1949, which prompted Chinese accusations of a plot to turn Tibet into a British colony, and a consequent vow to "liberate" it.

Of the Tibetan government during his time in Lhasa, Richardson said:

"My counterparts were... experienced negotiators... and masters of procrastination and evasion, and might assume the cloak of simple people with no experience of the outside world... There could be no doubt I was dealing with ministers of a government that was completely independent in both its internal and external affairs."

Like many ICS officers, Richardson was an accomplished linguist who spoke Bengali fluently, a skill he put to use when conversing with Rabindranath Tagore, and his fluent Tibetan was described by the Tibetan politician Tsepon W.D. Shakabpa as "impeccable Lhasa Tibetan with a slight Oxford accent." As Secretary to the Agent-General for India at Chungking, he was appointed an Officer of the Order of the British Empire (OBE) in the 1944 New Year Honours list, and was further appointed a Companion of the Order of the Indian Empire (CIE) on 14 August 1947, in the last imperial honours list. After Indian independence, Richardson remained in the renamed Indian Administrative Service, serving in Lhasa until his retirement in September 1950. After his retirement from public service he taught in Seattle and Bonn. He subsequently returned to St. Andrews and spent the remainder of his life as an independent scholar.

He was an advocate of the right of Tibetans to a separate political existence, a case he made in two books, Tibet and Its History (1962) and A Cultural History of Tibet (1968), and at the United Nations when the issue of Chinese oppression of Tibet was raised by the Irish Republic, represented by Frank Aiken, during the 1959 UN General Assembly debate on Tibet. There, in the words of one commentator, "he acted valiantly as a man of honour in a cause which has been largely lost because of the notions of political expediency, where sides are taken without regard to principle and in order not to risk aligning oneself with a potential loser, however deserving he may be" – a position which reportedly earned him the displeasure of both the British and Indian delegations to the UN Assembly. He remained a close personal friend of the 14th Dalai Lama and of the Tibetan government-in-exile until his death, with the latter describing Richardson as "very precious to us."

He later wrote: "The British government, the only government among Western countries to have had treaty relations with Tibet, sold the Tibetans down the river and since then have constantly cold-shouldered the Tibetans so that in 1959 they could not even support a resolution in the UN condemning the violation of human rights in Tibet by the Chinese."

Richardson also said that he was "profoundly ashamed", not only at the British government's refusal to recognise that Tibet had a right to self-determination, but also at the government's treatment of the 14th Dalai Lama.

== Personal interests ==
"His hobbies were ornithology, botany and gardening and he was also an enthusiastic photographer. Another of Richardson's passions was golf, which he introduced to Tibet, although he noted that the ball tended to travel 'rather too far in the thin air'."

== Works ==
- 1943 with Basil Gould. Tibetan Word Book. Oxford University Press.
- 1949 “Three ancient inscriptions from Tibet” Journal of the Royal Asiatic Society of Bengal 15, (1949): 45–64.
- 1952. Ancient historical edicts at Lhasa and the Mu Tsung / Khri Gtsung Lde Brtsan treaty of A.D. 821–822 from the inscription at Lhasa. London: Royal Asiatic Society Prize Publication Fund 19, 1952.
- 1952–3 “Tibetan inscriptions at Zva-hi Lha Khang” London: Journal of the Royal Asiatic Society, (1952): 133–54 (1953): 1–12.
- 1954 “A ninth-century inscription from Rkong-po.” Journal of the Royal Asiatic Society. London, (1954): 157–73.
- 1957 “A Tibetan Inscription from Rgyal Lha-khang” Journal of the Royal Asiatic Society London, (1957): 57–78.
- 1962 "Tibet and its History". Oxford University Press.
- 1964 “A new inscription of Khri Srong Lde Brtans.” Journal of the Royal Asiatic Society London. (1964): 1–13.
- 1965a "How old was Srong-brtsan Sgam-po?", Bulletin of Tibetology, vol. 2, no. 1, 6–8. Repr. in Richardson 1998: 3–6.
- 1965b "A fragment from Tun-huang", Bulletin of Tibetology, vol. 2, no. 3, 33–38. Repr. in Richardson 1998: 7–11.
- 1968 with David Snellgrove. A Cultural History of Tibet. 1995 2nd Edition with changes. Shambhala. Boston & London. ISBN 1-57062-102-0.
- 1969 "The inscription at the Tomb of Khri Lde Srong Btsan", Journal of the Royal Asiatic Society (1969): 29–38
- 1969b "Tibetan chis and tschis." Asia Major 14 (1969): 154–6.
- 1972 "The rKong-po Inscription." Journal of the Royal Asiatic Society London. (1972): 30–39.
- 1973 "The Skar-cung inscription." Journal of the Royal Asiatic Society. (1973): 12–20.
- 1974 Ch'ing Dynasty Inscriptions at Lhasa. (Serie Orientale Roma v. 47). Rome: Instituto italiano per l'africa e l'oriente. 1974.
- 1978 “The Sino-Tibetan treaty inscription of A.D. 821/823 at Lhasa.” Journal of the Royal Asiatic Society: (1978): 137–62.
- 1982 "Memories of Tshurphu", Bulletin of Tibetology, Vol. 18, No.1, 1982: Karmapa Commemoration Volume, Repr. in Richardson 1998, pp: 730–733.
- 1983 “Bal-po and Lho-bal” Bulletin of the School of Oriental and African Studies 46 (1983): 136–8.
- 1985. A Corpus of Early Tibetan Inscriptions. (James G. Forlong Series no. 29). Hertford: Royal Asiatic Society, 1985. ISBN 0-947593-00-4.
- 1987 "Early Tibetan Inscriptions: Some Recent Discoveries” The Tibet Journal 12.2.Dharamsala: Library of Tibetan works and archives, (1987): 3–15. (reprinted with 2 short notes added) Bulletin of Tibetology n.s. 3. Gangtok Sikkim Research Institute of Tibetology, (1987): 5–18. High Peaks, Pure Earth. London: Serindia, 1998: 261–275.
- 1988 “More Early Inscriptions from Tibet” Bulletin of Tibetology. New Series 2. Gangtok Sikkim Research Institute of Tibetology. (1988): 5–8. High Peaks, Pure Earth. London: Serindia, 1998: 276–278.
- 1989 "Early Tibetan law concerning dog-bite", Bulletin of Tibetology, new ser. 3, 5–10. Repr. in Richardson 1998: 135–139.
- 1990 "Hunting accidents in early Tibet", Tibet Journal, 15-4, 5–27. Repr. in Richardson 1998: 149–166.
- 1993 "Ceremonies of the Lhasa Year", Serindia Publications ISBN 0-906026-29-6
- 1995a “The Tibetan Inscription attributed to Ye shes ‘od” Journal of the Royal Asiatic Society. 3rd Series 5.3. (1995): 403–404.
- 1995b “The inscription at Ra-tshag Dgon-pa” Bulletin of the School of Oriental and African Studies 58 (1995): 534–9; High Peaks, Pure Earth. London: Serindia, 1998: 286–291.
- 1997 Adventures of Tibetan Fighting Monk with Khedrup Tashi, White Orchid Books; ISBN 974-87368-7-3, Orchid Press, 2006, ISBN 974-8299-17-1
- 1998 High peaks, pure earth: collected writings on Tibetan history and culture, Serindia publications, London.
