= Rae Selling Berry =

American gardener

- Born: January 21, 1881; Portland, Oregon
- Died: October 9, 1976 (aged 95)
- Occupations: Gardener and Horticulturist

Rae Selling Berry (January 21, 1881 – October 9, 1976) was an American gardener and horticulturist.

== Early life ==
Berry, the daughter of Ben Selling and Mathilda Hess, grew up in Portland, Oregon. Her father was a philanthropist, politician, and well-known civic leader in Portland's Jewish community. She began to lose her hearing at a young age, and learned to lip read in order to understand the people around her. In 1899, she went on a world tour. She married Alfred C. Urmston Berry on December 17, 1901. He was a contractor who became the superintendent of the Portland International Airport.

== Career ==
For more than thirty years, the couple and their three children lived in northeast Portland's Irvington neighborhood, where Berry developed an interest in plants. Reading about plant expeditions to Europe and Asia, she began to provide financial support for the expeditions and through them to obtain seeds. The Oregonian profiled her garden in 1922 and noted her extensive collection of at least nine primrose species. Many of Berry's primroses were grown from seeds imported from England.

By the mid-1930s, Berry had run out of room for her plants in Irvington, and the couple moved to "a bowl-shaped site nestled near the top of a hill". The property, Berry Botanic Garden, just north of Lake Oswego, included a variety of habitats and terrain, and was partly covered with second-growth Douglas fir.

In developing the garden, Berry focused on "exceptional plants", particularly rhododendrons, primulas, and alpines. In 1964, the Garden Club of America awarded her the Florens DeBevoise Medal for her knowledge of plants. In 1965, she won the American Rhododendron Society's first Award of Excellence given to a woman, and she was honored for her work by the American Rock Garden Society.

Berry continued to expand her collection past the age of 80, taking field trips in search of Oregon's only primrose, Primula cusickiana (Cusick's primrose). At age 90, she was still planting seeds in the gardens, and died at home at age 96.

== See also ==
- List of people from Portland, Oregon
