= Alpine Garden Society =

Gardening Society based in the United Kingdom

- Abbreviation: AGS
- Formation: 10 December 1929; 96 years ago
- Type: Registered charity
- Purpose: To promote the cultivation, conservation and exploration of alpine and rock garden plants, small hardy herbaceous plants, hardy and half-hardy bulbs, hardy ferns and small shrubs
- Headquarters: Pershore, Worcestershire
- Region served: United Kingdom; significant numbers of international members
- Website: http://www.alpinegardensociety.net

The Alpine Garden Society headquarters are at Pershore, Worcestershire. It is an "International Society for the cultivation, conservation and exploration of alpine and rock garden plants, small hardy herbaceous plants, hardy and half-hardy bulbs, hardy ferns and small shrubs".

It publishes a quarterly journal, now titled The Alpine Gardener for those with less experience or time and enthusiasts.

== What is an alpine plant? ==
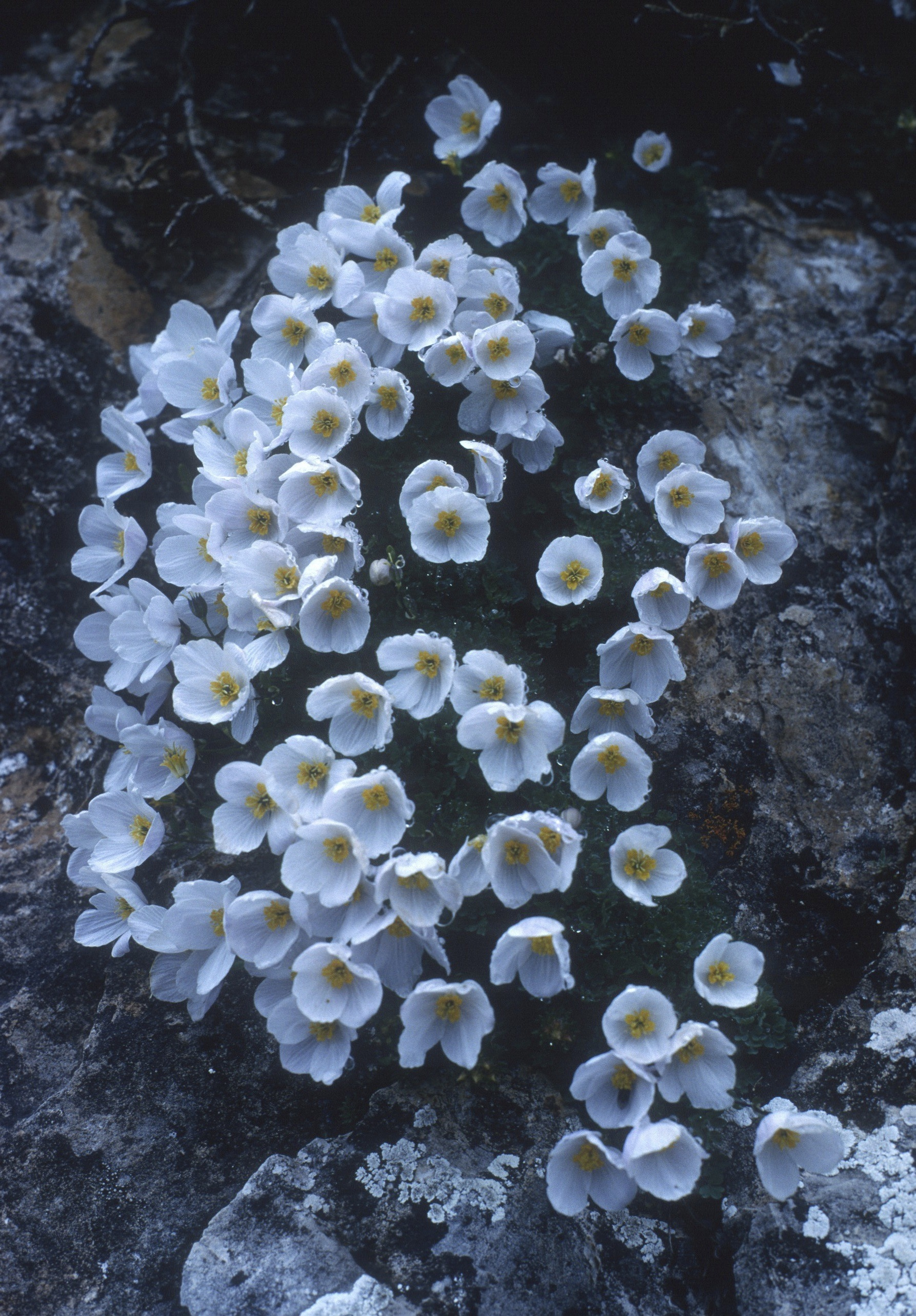
Paraquilegia microphylla photographed in scree at about 4,300m in Sichuan, China.

An Alpine is a plant that occurs in the region above the tree line and below permanent snow in mountainous regions. Within temperate and boreal regions, the alpine zone can be subdivided into three zones, each with characteristic vegetation types: Lower alpine, with bush and tall herb communities; Middle alpine, in which sedges, grasses and heath species dominate; and, Upper alpine, with dwarf herbaceous, prostrate woody plants, lichens and mosses. The zonation in tropical and sub-tropical mountains differs significantly and the plants of these zones tend to fall without the domain of interest of AGS members.

As a result of this quite natural expansion of enthusiasm, the AGS has steadily expanded its domain of interest to include "small hardy herbaceous plants, hardy and half-hardy bulbs (more strictly geophytes), hardy ferns and small shrubs". This in turn has led to a long-term debate about whether or not the AGS should change its name to reflect its evolution into a society with very catholic interests. Nevertheless, alpine plants sensu stricto remain a core and common interest to the members of the society, and so are central to its identity.

== The AGS Encyclopaedia of Alpines and Other Hardy Plants ==
The AGS first published its Encyclopaedia of Alpines in 1993. This two-volume work became a standard reference, defining the domain of interest for AGS members. This work was later available online as The AGS Encyclopaedia of Alpines and Other Hardy Plants. This online work is freely available. The Society maintains editorial control of the Encyclopaedia.

== Plant shows ==
The AGS organises shows for Alpine and Rock Garden plants at a range of venues in England, Wales and Ireland. These take place throughout the year, particularly during February to May. The shows include plant fairs where plants are for sale.

Exhibiting at these shows is a specialised activity because the plants need to be grown in pots or other containers, which can be a more time-consuming activity than growing plants in the open garden. The AGS has been running an online plant show since 2006. This enables those with less time to display images of their plants and receive feedback from expert judges and from the community of members. Images of plants growing in the open garden, and of gardens themselves, may be submitted.

The AGS frequently has acted as an exhibitor at the UK's Chelsea Flower Show. An example of an AGS display winning an award includes the 2008 AGS exhibit winning the President's Award for best display in the Marquee.

== History ==
=== 1929 to 1989 ===
The society was founded in 1929. Sir William Lawrence, who was at the time the treasurer of the Royal Horticultural Society, first suggested creating a "rock garden society" in June 1929. The first general meeting was held on 10 December 1929, when the name was changed to its present one, as its principal purpose was to encourage the cultivation of alpine plants. Its founding members included Dorothy Renton and her husband. Lawrence became the society's first president.

Within five months, on 5 April 1930, the society held its first show, a tradition which has continued since. Exhibitors compete for awards, including the Sewell Medal and the Farrer Memorial Medal, introduced in 1931. Non-competitive displays have been included from 1931 onwards.

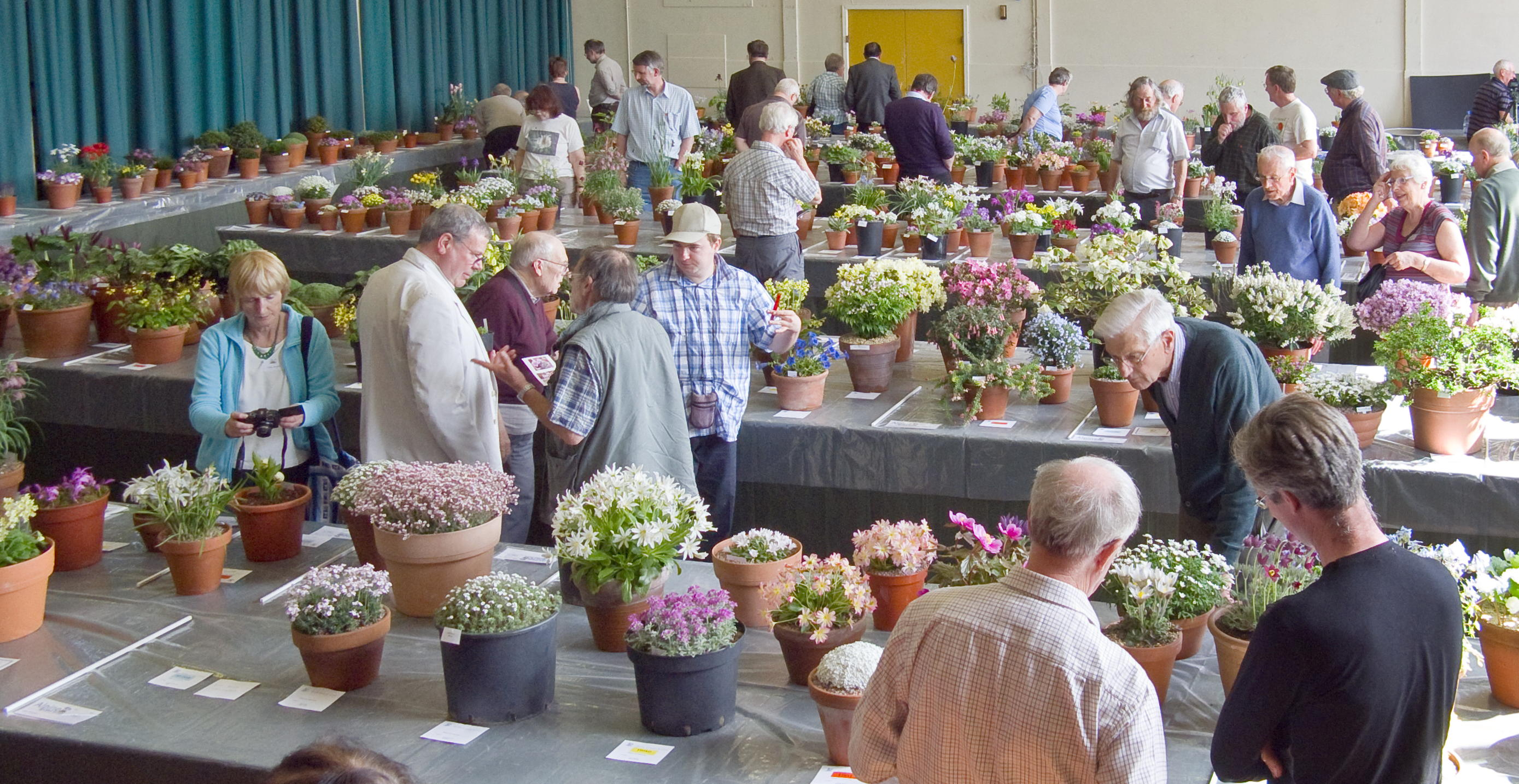
AGS Midland Show 2011

From the beginning the society supported expeditions which involved collecting plants from the wild for introduction into cultivation. The support sometimes took the form of individual members taking shares in an expedition by providing finance in return for a proportion of the material which was collected. The society also organized its own tours, beginning in 1933 with a tour to Snowdonia. Tours continue today, although with changed attitudes to conservation, the society does not allow collecting on its tours.

The first "bulletin" was produced in 1930, containing only 13 pages. The size rapidly increased. From 1930 to 1944 (Volumes 1 to 12 – not one per year) it was called the Bulletin of the Alpine Garden Society; from 1945 (Volume 13), "Quarterly" was added to the title and it became the Quarterly Bulletin of the Alpine Garden Society. The Bulletin contained (and continues to contain) articles of various kinds, including reports of the Society's shows, information on cultivating plants which fall within the society's remit, and accounts of such plants in the wild. Photography was an important aspect of the Bulletin, initially confined to black-and-white, such as the picture of Ramonda myconi (then called R. pyrenaica) in the second Bulletin. Although there were earlier experiments with colour printing, colour was not used in earnest until 1984.

The society produced other publications from the earliest days. Initially these were obtained by reprinting material from the Bulletin as a separate work. The first was The Scree Garden in 1933. In later years, the Society supported the publication of more overtly scientific works, such as the monograph on the genus Daphne by Christopher Brickell and Brian Mathew. A subsidiary of the society, AGS Publications, was set up and had a turnover of more than £70,000 by 1989.

One of the society's early scientific activities was evaluating plants which fell within its scope for their suitability for cultivation and their merits when cultivated. The society alone first issued the award of Certificate of Merit and Botanical Certificate in 1933. The Royal Horticultural Society regarded itself as the legitimate UK body to make such awards, and in 1936, a joint committee was set up, affectionately known as the "Joint Rock" (officially the Joint Rock Garden Plant Committee), which makes awards such as the Award of Garden Merit (AGM). Another activity with a scientific flavour introduced in 1936 was the three-day international conference.

Local secretaries were first introduced in 1936, which later resulted in local groups, affiliated to the main AGS, but allowing a limited number of people to join the local group but not the main AGS.

In 1954, founder member, Dorothy Renton, took the Royal Horticultural Society's Veitch Memorial Medal for her work in developing a garden in Scotland.

== Presidents of the society ==
The founding president was in 1929 was Sir William Lawrence. Since then presidents have included:

- 1945 Paul Giuseppi
- - 2017 David Haselgrove
- 2017 - 2021 Christopher Bailes
- - 2024 David Morris
- 2024 Rob Amos
