= Valerie Finnis =

Valerie Finnis (1924–2006) was a well-known British photographer, lecturer, teacher and gardener.

== Life ==
Finnis was born in Crowborough, Sussex, daughter of a naval officer, Steriker Finnis, and gardener Constance Finnis. She attended Hayes Court school in Kent and Downe House school in Berkshire. In 1968 she met retired diplomat and plantsman David Scott whom she married in 1970 and with whom she lived, gardening together until his death in 1986. In 1990 she set up the Merlin Trust, named after David Scott's only son Merlin who was killed in the second world war, aged 22. The Merlin Trust assists young horticulturists to travel and gain experience. After her death in 2006, the Finnis Scott Foundation was established to provide supportive funding to artistic, art historical, horticultural or botanical projects.

Finnis contributed many articles to the Journal of the Royal Horticultural Society (renamed in 1975 The Garden). She was not only an avid professional photographer, but also a collector of photographs. By the time of her death, she had amassed a collection of more than 50,000 photographic images. She mainly collected plant portraits but also some photographs of famous people, including Cedric Morris, Margery Fish, and Vita Sackville-West.

== Waterperry ==
For 28 years Valerie Finnis was associated with Waterperry Horticultural School for Women, at Waterperry House, situated just outside Oxford. She first went to Waterperry in 1942, aged 18, at which time it was run by Beatrix Havergal, and helped make it a famous horticultural institution. While teaching at Waterperry, she became noted for her expertise in alpine plants, propagating 50,000 plants a year in the school's greenhouses.

Among her work as a plant breeder, she developed a cross between an "orange-peel" clematis (C. orientalis and C. tangutica) she named for Bill MacKenzie.

== Influences ==
BBC personality Carol Klein reports Finnis encouraging her work.

The plant Artemisia ludoviciana 'Valerie Finnis' is named after Finnis. It was given to her by Wilhelm Schacht of Munich Botanic Garden in 1949 (wrongly as A. borealis). Another artemisia, Artemisia stelleriana 'Boughton Silver' is named after her garden at Boughton House Northamptonshire. This plant originally known as 'Mori's form' was given to her on her honeymoon in Japan in 1970 by Mr Mori. It has been renamed 'Silver Brocade' in Canada. (Ref to John Twibell, Plant Heritage National Collection of Artemisia - personal Communication)

== Awards ==
She was awarded the Victoria Medal of Honour in 1975 by the Royal Horticultural Society.

== Bibliography ==
Books written or illustrated by Valerie Finnis

- Collins Guide to Alpines (1964) by Anna Nellie Griffith (author); photographs by Valerie Finnis. London: Collins
- Wild Flowers of Greece (1965) by Kaity Argyropoulo; illustrated by Valerie Finnis. Athens Society of the Friends of the Trees.
- The Oxford Book of Garden Flowers (1968) by E. B. Anderson, Margery Fish, A. P. Balfour, Michael Wallis and Valerie Finnis, illustrated by B. E. Nicholson. Oxford University Press.
- Garden People: The Photographs of Valerie Finnis (2007) by Ursula Buchan (author); photographs by Valerie Finnis. London: Thames and Hudson
