= Branklyn Garden =

Gardens in Perth, Scotland

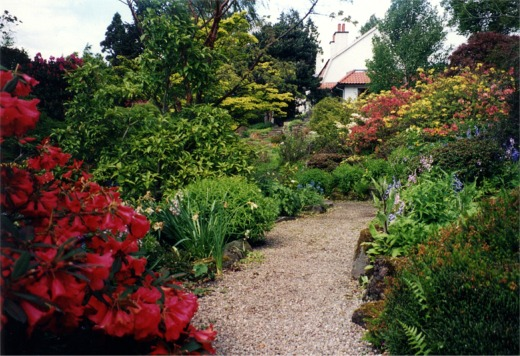
- Part of the gardens and the Rentons' former home, pictured in 2011

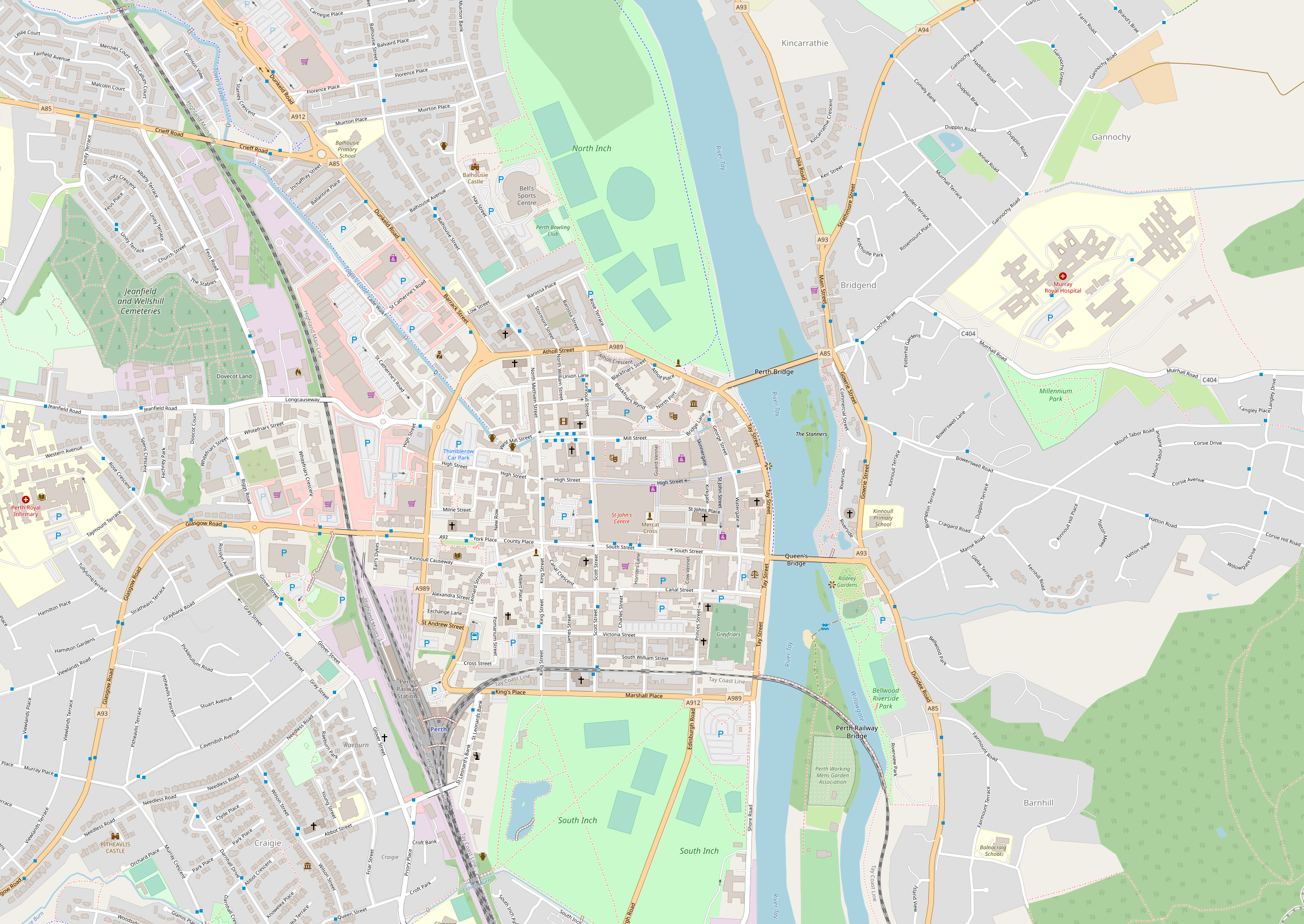
- Location within Perth
- Interactive map of Branklyn Garden
- Type: Garden
- Location: 116 Dundee Road, Perth, Scotland
- Coordinates: 56.3883892°N 3.4185777°W
- Area: 2 acres (0.81 ha)
- Established: 1922 (104 years ago)
- Founder: John and Dorothy Renton
- Owner: National Trust for Scotland
- Operator: National Trust for Scotland

Designations

Inventory of Gardens and Designed Landscapes in Scotland
- Official name: Branklyn
- Designated: 30 June 1987
- Reference no.: GDL00069

Branklyn Garden is a hillside public garden in the Kinnoull area of the Scottish city of Perth. The garden is set in 2 acres (0.81 ha) in the western foothills of Kinnoull Hill.

A National Trust for Scotland site, the garden was established in 1922 by John and Dorothy Renton, who built a house on the property. The couple's desire was to have a garden that featured rare and unusual plants, along with flowers from all over the world. Several people, including George Forrest and Frank Ludlow, collected seeds for the garden, which now has over 3,500 species of plants. Today, the garden is also home to several national collections of plants, including Meconopsis and Cassiope.
