= Kirkton of Kingoldrum =

Coordinates: 56.681996°N 3.087053°W

Kirkton of Kingoldrum: Scottish Gaelic: Ceann Coilldruim
- Location within Angus
- OS grid reference: NO335550
- Council area: Angus
- Lieutenancy area: Angus
- Country: Scotland
- Sovereign state: United Kingdom
- Post town: KIRRIEMUIR
- Postcode district: DD8
- Dialling code: 01575
- Police: Scotland
- Fire: Scottish
- Ambulance: Scottish
- UK Parliament: Angus
- Scottish Parliament: Angus South

Kirkton of Kingoldrum (Scottish Gaelic: Ceann Coilldruim) is a village in Angus, Scotland. It lies in approximately four miles (6 km) west of Kirriemuir on the B951 road.

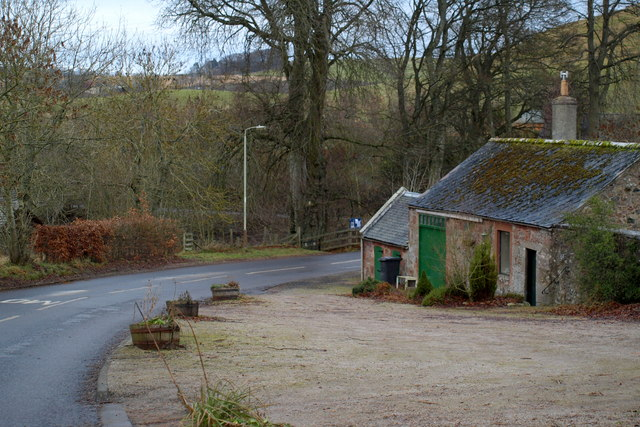
Kirkton of Kingoldrum
