= George Sherriff =

Explorer and plant collector (1898–1967)

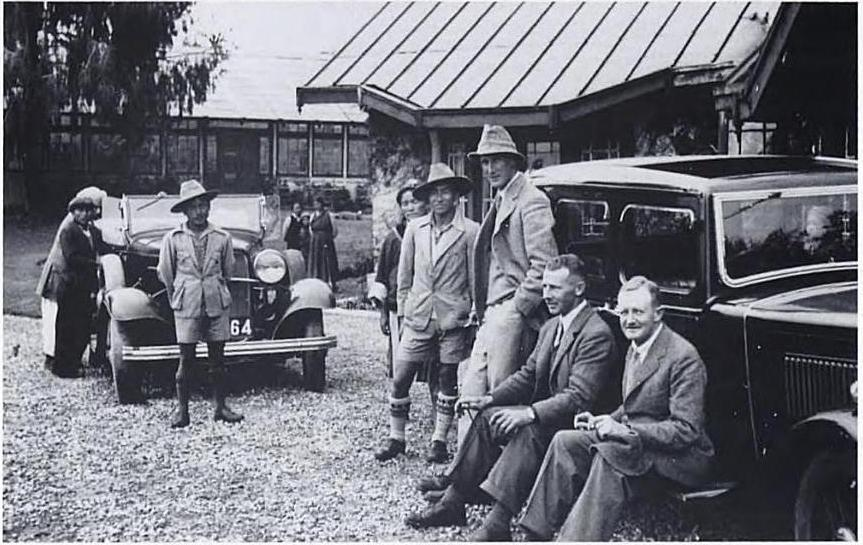
Frank Ludlow, George Sherriff and Frederick Williamson, 1933 in Gangtok, Sikkim

Major George Sherriff OBE (1898–1967) was a Scottish explorer and plant collector.

== Biography ==
Born in Larbert, he was educated at Sedbergh School and attended the Royal Military Academy, Woolwich. In 1918 he took a commission in the Royal Garrison Artillery, fighting in France. After the close of the First World War, in which he was injured, he was posted to Nowshera, then in British India, during the Waziristan campaign of 1919–1920. From 1927 to 1931 he served as the British vice-consul in Kashgar, Chinese Turkestan, under the consul general Frederick Williamson.

In Kashgar he met the naturalist Frank Ludlow, and between 1933 and 1938 the two made several expeditions into the Himalayan regions of Tibet and Bhutan, collecting thousands of specimens, many of which were new to science. He joined the Indian Army on the outbreak of the Second World War, serving in Assam. In 1943 he was appointed to lead the British Mission in Lhasa, taking over from Ludlow. The two men undertook further plant hunting expeditions in remote parts of Tibet, with their last expedition to Bhutan in 1949. Many of the specimens collected by Sherriff are held in the Natural History Museum in London.

In 1947 Sherriff was appointed OBE, and in 1948 was awarded the Royal Horticultural Society's Victoria Medal of Honour. On returning to Britain in 1950, he bought the estate of Ascreavie in Angus, where he cultivated a collection of Himalayan plants, described as having "outstanding horticultural value". He served on Angus County Council from 1952 to 1966.

Sherriff's papers are held by the Royal Botanic Garden of Edinburgh.
