= Tibetan silver =

Non-precious metal alloys in China

Tibetan silver (Chinese Zangyin) in modern usage refers to a variety of white non-precious metal alloys used primarily in jewelry components, with an appearance similar to aged silver.

== Description ==
=== Silver in Tibet ===
In ancient times silver was imported from regions near modern Iran (Bactria, Khorasan), and an association of silverwork with Iran appears to have developed. Silver was imported from China (as ingots), India (tankas), and from Mongolia and Siberia. Some silver was mined in Tibet, but imports were required to satisfy the country's requirements for minting.

In addition to coinage silver was used in Tibet for repousse work, and as an inlay in brass and copper statues.

Historically 'Tibetan Silver' did contain silver, and some old items may be predominantly silver.

=== Modern usage ===
'Tibetan Silver' includes copper-tin, and copper-nickel alloys; zinc alloys; and other alloy compositions, as well as base metals such as iron plated with a silver alloy. An X-ray fluorescence analysis showed that six of seven items acquired online and described as 'Tibetan silver' were alloys containing primarily copper, nickel, zinc.

There are potential health hazards associated with Tibetan Silver due to the undefined or uncertain definition of the alloy - these include allergies due to Nickel, but also could include other serious hazards including the presence of lead or arsenic in the alloy.

=== Zangyin ===
Zangyin is a Chinese term for 'Tibetan silver' - it seems to originate from a scholar's term for the inferior silver adulterated with high proportion of copper used for Tibetan coinage in the late Qing dynasty period.
