= Ben Selling =

Community leader in Portland, Oregon (1852/53 – 1931)

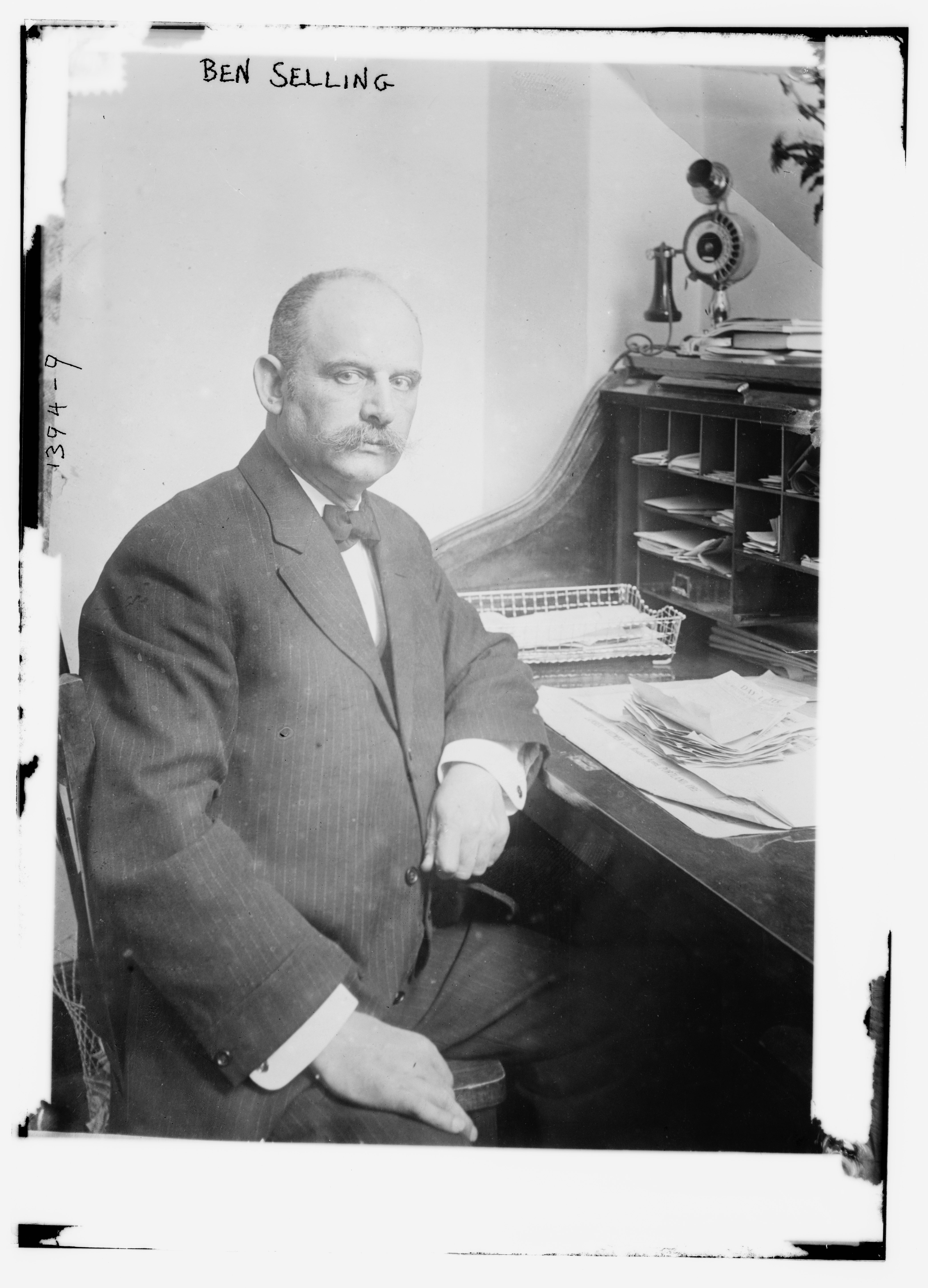

27th Speaker of the Oregon House of Representatives
- In office 1915–1917
- Preceded by: Clifton N. McArthur
- Succeeded by: Robert N. Stanfield
- Majority: Republican Party

Member of the Oregon House of Representatives from the 18^{th} District
- In office 1915–1917
- Preceded by: Robert W. Hagood
- Succeeded by: A. C. Callen
- Constituency: Clackamas and Multnomah counties

President of the Oregon Senate
- In office 1911–1913
- Preceded by: Jay Bowerman
- Succeeded by: Donald Malarkey
- Majority: Republican Party

Member of the Oregon State Senate from the 1^{st} District
- In office 1911–1913 Serving with John A. Carson, Hal D. Patton

Member of the Oregon State Senate from the 13^{th} District
- In office 1909–1911 Serving with C. W. Nottingham, John B. Coffey

Personal details
- Born: 1852
- Died: 1931 (aged 78–79) Oregon, U.S.
- Party: Republican Party

Ben Selling (1852 or April 29, 1853 – 1931) was a businessman, philanthropist, civil rights advocate, and politician in Portland, Oregon, United States. He was a noted leader in the Jewish community, and he owned a clothing store in downtown Portland.

== Early life ==
Selling was born in San Francisco, California. His parents, Caroline Auerbach and Philip Selling, were both German immigrants. He arrived in Portland with his family circa 1862. There, his father ran a general merchandise store. Selling attended the Beth Israel Religious School and Portland Academy. Because his father needed his help in the store, Selling was unable to finish his education at Portland Academy.

== Marriage and family ==
Selling married Matilda Hess on March 14, 1880 in San Francisco. Like her husband, Matilda Hess Selling was deeply involved in Portland's Jewish community. She was a member of the National Council of Jewish Women (NCJW), serving as the president of its Portland chapter from 1906 to 1908. From 1900 to 1930, she was also president of the sewing school at Neighborhood House, a community organization founded by the NCJW. The Sellings had two children; Rae Selling Berry, born in 1881, and Laurence Selling, born in 1882.

== Businesses ==
In 1881, Selling opened a boot and shoe business called Akin, Selling & Company. By 1903, he was running a clothing store called Ben Selling, Clothier. He was regarded as "the outstanding Jewish leader in Portland", receiving the first First Citizen Award from the Portland Realty Board in 1928. Portland historian E. Kimbark MacColl remarked the choice of Selling was ironic because he "possessed none of the acquisitive instincts ... associated with the realty trade."

== Philanthropy ==
Selling was known for his philanthropy. He organized kitchens for the unemployed during the Panic of 1893 and Panic of 1907, serving over 450,000 meals. In 1914, he founded the Working Men's Club, which sold meals for five cents apiece to homeless and unemployed men. The club also provided some meals at no cost. The Working Men's Club included an employment bureau, which, according to the Oregon Daily Journal, helped 600 to 700 men find work within a year of opening. Selling closed the club in 1916 due to the improved economy. The Oregonian stated that it had served nearly 400,000 meals.

In January 1916, Selling became treasurer of a committee to raise funds for Jews in Eastern Europe displaced by World War I. He asked Portlanders of all religions to donate to the cause, saying that "for the first time in 50 years I am asking non-Jews to help my people." The committee raised more than $14,000 within two months.

Selling heavily supported the Armenian Relief Society, bought $400,000 in Liberty Bonds during World War I, and supported the Waverly Baby Home and Jewish Neighborhood House, both in Portland. MacColl also stated "Suffice it to say, Ben Selling probably gave away more money in proportion to his income than any Oregon citizen since the state was founded."

== Political career ==
He served on the Port of Portland Commission, then on the Portland Dock Commission. After being elected to the Oregon State Senate in 1910, he served as President of the Senate for one session in 1911. He was also Speaker of the Oregon House of Representatives for one session, 1915. He ran for the United States Senate in 1912, losing by a few hundred votes to Harry Lane.

== Death and legacy ==
Selling died on January 15, 1931 of bronchial pneumonia. In his will, he left a $100,000 trust fund to provide scholarships for college students. After his death, four of his 40 employees sued his estate, saying he had promised the business to them. Their claims were rejected, as Selling was known for being honest and writing everything down.

== See also ==
- Selling Building

Party political offices
First	Republican nominee for U.S. Senator from Oregon (Class 2); 1913	Succeeded by Frederick W. Mulkey
