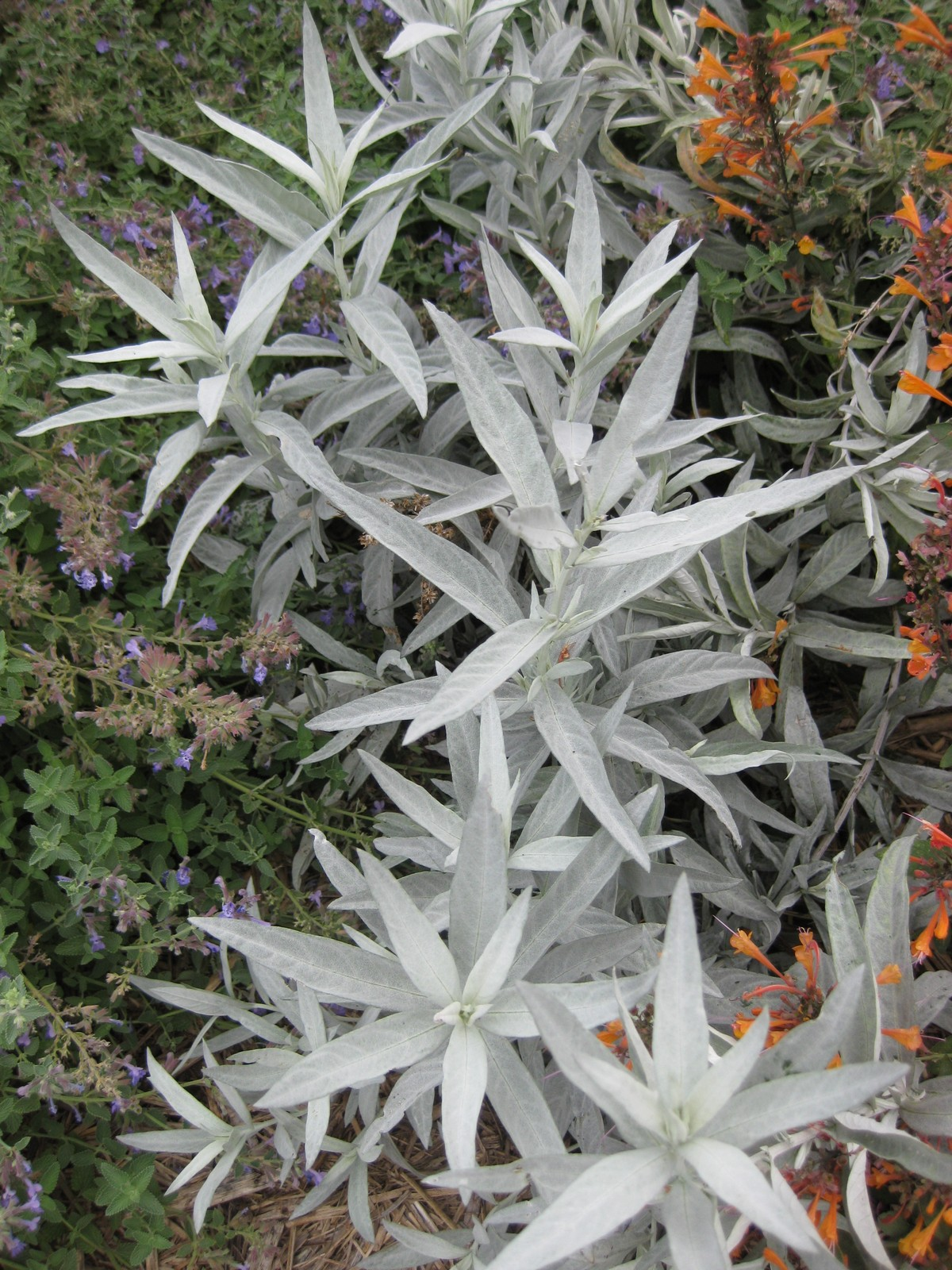

Conservation status
- Secure (NatureServe)

Scientific classification
- Kingdom: Plantae
- Clade: Tracheophytes
- Clade: Angiosperms
- Clade: Eudicots
- Clade: Asterids
- Order: Asterales
- Family: Asteraceae
- Genus: Artemisia
- Species: A. ludoviciana

Binomial name
- Artemisia ludoviciana Nutt.

Synonyms
- Synonymy: Artemisia albula Wooton; Artemisia arachnoidea E.Sheld.; Artemisia atomifera Piper; Artemisia brittonii Rydb.; Artemisia candicans Rydb.; Artemisia cuneata Rydb.; Artemisia cuneifolia Scheele; Artemisia discolor Douglas ex DC.; Artemisia discolor var. incompta (Nutt.) A.Gray; Artemisia diversifolia Rydb.; Artemisia ghiesbreghtii Rydb.; Artemisia gnaphalodes Nutt.; Artemisia gnaphalodes var. diversifolia A.Nelson; Artemisia gracilenta A.Nelson; Artemisia herriotii Rydb.; Artemisia incompta Nutt.; Artemisia indica var. mexicana A.Gray; Artemisia integrifolia Richardson; Artemisia latiloba Rydb.; Artemisia lindheimeriana Scheele; Artemisia lindleyana Besser; Artemisia lindleyana var. brevifolia Besser; Artemisia lindleyana var. coronopus Besser; Artemisia lindleyana var. legitima Besser; Artemisia lindleyana var. subdentata Besser; Artemisia ludoviciana var. albula (Wooton) Shinners; Artemisia ludoviciana var. americana (Besser) Fernald; Artemisia ludoviciana var. atomifera M.E.Jones; Artemisia ludoviciana var. brittonii (Rydb.) Fernald; Artemisia ludoviciana var. candicans (Rydb.) H.St.John; Artemisia ludoviciana var. cuneata (Rydb.) Fernald; Artemisia ludoviciana subsp. gnaphalodes (Nutt.) Á.Löve & D.Löve; Artemisia ludoviciana var. gnaphalodes (Nutt.) Torr. & A.Gray; Artemisia ludoviciana var. incompta (Nutt.) Cronquist; Artemisia ludoviciana var. latiloba Nutt.; Artemisia ludoviciana var. latifolia (Besser) Torr. & A.Gray; Artemisia ludoviciana var. lindheimeriana (Scheele) Bush; Artemisia ludoviciana var. mexicana (Willd. ex Spreng.) Fernald; Artemisia ludoviciana var. mexicana (Spreng.) A.Gray; Artemisia ludoviciana var. pabularis (A.Nelson) Fernald; Artemisia ludoviciana var. redolens (A.Gray) Shinners; Artemisia ludoviciana subsp. sulcata (Rydb.) D.D.Keck; Artemisia ludoviciana f. tenuifolia A.Gray; Artemisia ludoviciana subsp. typica D.D.Keck; Artemisia mexicana Willd. ex Spreng.; Artemisia mexicana var. angustifolia Sch.Bip.; Artemisia mexicana var. latifolia Sch.Bip.; Artemisia mexicana var. silvicola (Osterh.) A.Nelson; Artemisia microcephala Wooton; Artemisia muelleri Rydb.; Artemisia neomexicana Greene ex Rydb.; Artemisia pabularis Rydb.; Artemisia paucicephala A.Nelson; Artemisia platyphylla Rydb.; Artemisia prescottiana Besser; Artemisia pudica Rydb.; Artemisia pumila Nutt.; Artemisia purshiana var. angustifolia Besser; Artemisia purshiana var. latifolia Besser; Artemisia redolens A.Gray; Artemisia revoluta Rydb. 1916 not Edgew. 1846; Artemisia rhizomata A.Nelson; Artemisia rhizomata var. pabularis A.Nelson; Artemisia silvicola Osterh.; Artemisia sulcata Rydb.; Artemisia vulgaris var. americana Besser; Artemisia vulgaris subsp. candicans H.M.Hall & Clem.; Artemisia vulgaris var. candicans (Rydb.) M.Peck; Artemisia vulgaris subsp. discolor (Douglas) H.M.Hall & Clem.; Artemisia vulgaris var. discolor (Douglas) Jeps.; Artemisia vulgaris subsp. gnaphalodes (Nutt.) H.M.Hall & Clem.; Artemisia vulgaris var. gnaphalodes (Nutt.) Kuntze; Artemisia vulgaris var. incompta H.St.John; Artemisia vulgaris subsp. lindleyana (Besser) H.M.Hall & Clem.; Artemisia vulgaris var. lindleyana (Besser) Jeps.; Artemisia vulgaris subsp. ludoviciana (Nutt.) H.M.Hall & Clem.; Artemisia vulgaris var. ludoviciana (Nutt.) Kuntze; Artemisia vulgaris subsp. mexicana (Willd. ex Spreng.) H.M.Hall & Clem.; Artemisia vulgaris var. mexicana (Willd. ex Spreng.) Torr. & A.Gray; Artemisia vulgaris subsp. redolens H.M.Hall & Clem.; Oligosporus mexicanus (Willd. ex Spreng.) Less.

= Artemisia ludoviciana =

Species of plant

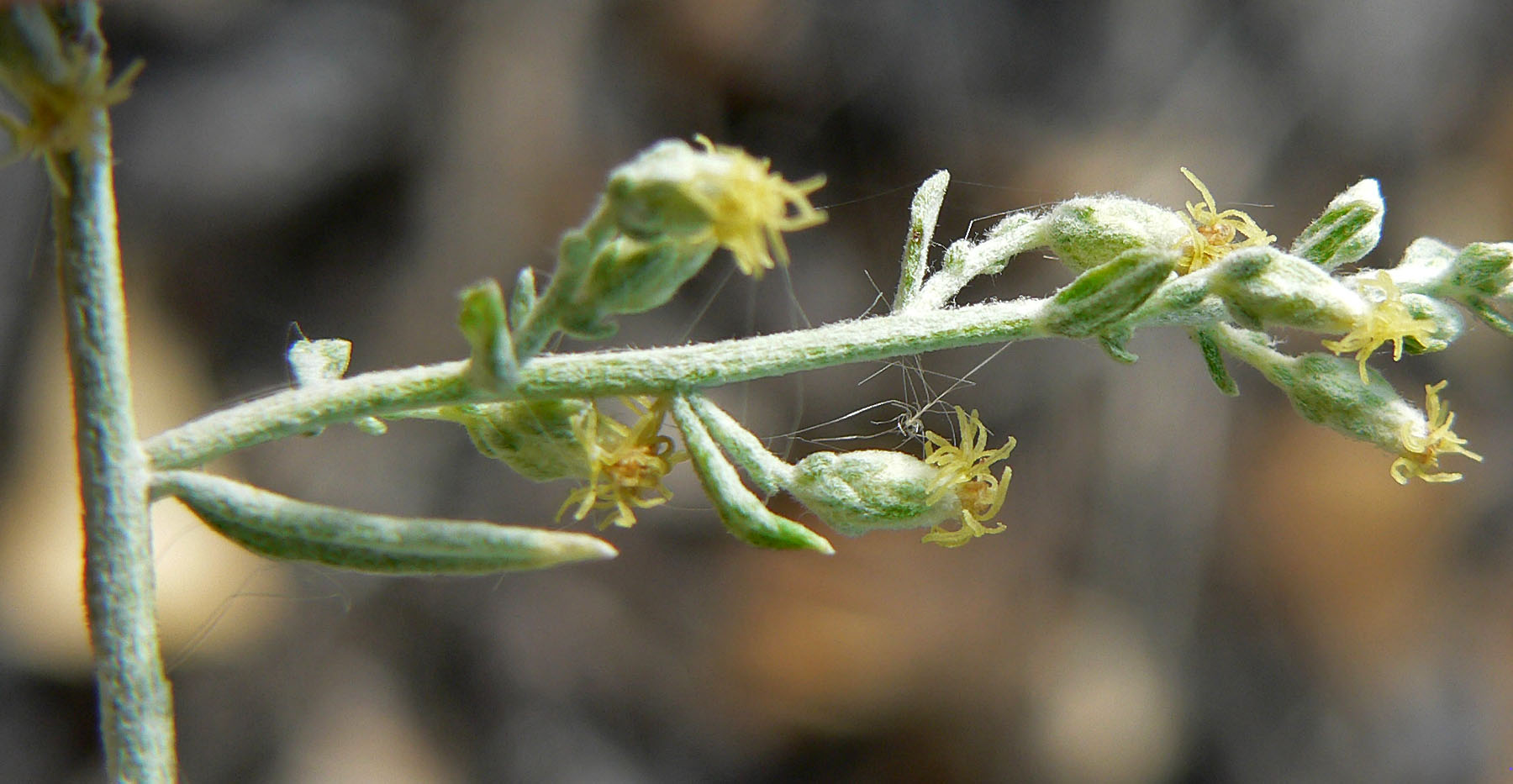
A. l. subsp. albula, Spring Mountains, southern Nevada, elevation around 1,050 m

Artemisia ludoviciana is a North American species of flowering plant in the daisy family Asteraceae, known by several common names, including silver wormwood, western mugwort, Louisiana wormwood, white sagebrush, lobed cud-weed, prairie sage, and gray sagewort.

Ludoviciana is the Latinized version of the word Louisiana.

The plant is of great cultural significance in many Indigenous North American traditions.

== Description ==
Artemisia ludoviciana is a rhizomatous perennial growing to heights of 0.3–1.0 m (0.98–3.28 ft). The stems bear linear leaves up to 11 cm long. The stems and foliage are covered in woolly gray or white hairs. The top of the stem is occupied by a narrow inflorescence of many nodding (hanging) flower heads. Each small head is a cup of hairy phyllaries surrounding a center of yellowish disc florets and is about 0.5 cm wide. The fruit is a minute achene. Flowers bloom July to October.

== Distribution and habitat ==
The plant is native to North America where it is widespread across most of the United States, Canada, and Mexico. Some botanists suggest that eastern United States populations have been introduced from the western and central part of the continent. Its habitats include dry slopes, canyons, open pine woods, and dry prairies.

== Subspecies ==
The following subspecies are recognised:

- A. l. subsp. albula (Wooton) D.D.Keck—deserts from California and Colorado to Chihuahua, Sonora, Baja California
- A. l. subsp. candicans (Rydb.) D.D.Keck—Rocky Mountains and Cascade Range from Alberta, British Columbia to California, Colorado
- A. l. subsp. incompta (Nutt.) D.D.Keck—mountains from Alberta, British Columbia, to Mexico
- A. l. subsp. lindleyana (Besser) Lesica—Chihuahua, Sonora, Arizona
- A. l. subsp. ludoviciana—western and central United States and western Canada
- A. l. subsp. mexicana (Willd. ex Spreng.) D.D.Keck— Mexico as far south as Puebla; United States as far north as Colorado and Missouri
- A. l. subsp. redolens (A.Gray) D.D.Keck—Durango, Chihuahua, Arizona, New Mexico, Texas

== Uses ==
=== Indigenous usage ===
Indigenous tribes across the continent use the species as a medicinal plant, a source of fiber for crafting household items, and for ceremonial purposes; it is characterised by the University of Saskatchewan's "Traditional Garden" website as "one of the four sacred medicines, along with tobacco, cedar, and sweetgrass". The Dakota people use this plant in smudging rituals to protect against maleficent spirits. The Apache, Chiricahua and Mescalero use it for spices, while Blackfoot tribe use it as a drug for dermatological use. The Cree and Blackfoot tribes use it in sweat lodges and the sun dance. Gros Ventre also use it for skin curing and as medicine against cold, because it is also antipyretic. The Meskwaki and Potawatomi use a tea made from this species as a treatment for sore throat and tonsillitis.

=== Cultivation ===
A. ludoviciana is cultivated as an ornamental plant. Being rhizomatous, it can spread aggressively in some climates and gardens. It grows in dry to medium moisture and well-drained soil. It requires full sun.

Popular cultivars include 'Valerie Finnis' and 'Silver Queen'. Both are hardy to USDA zone 4. 'Valerie Finnis' has held the Royal Horticultural Society's Award of Garden Merit since 1993.
