= Frank Ludlow =

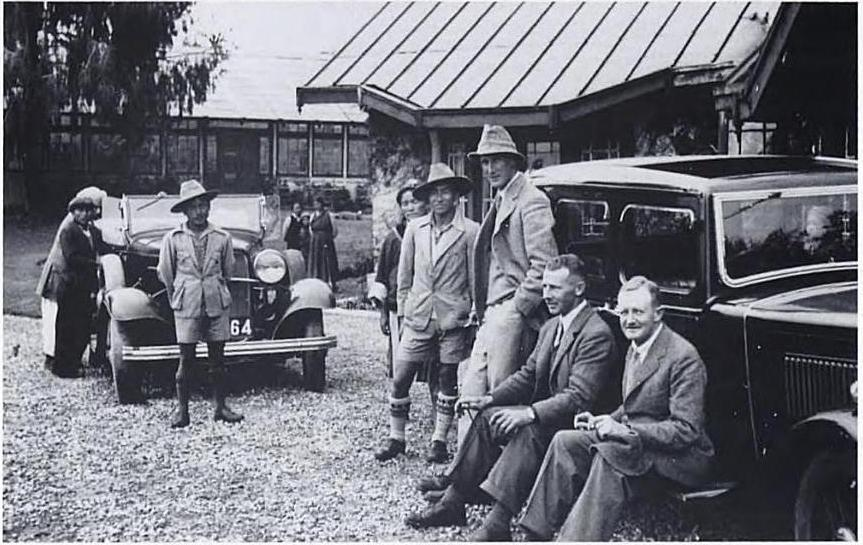
Frank Ludlow, George Sherriff and Frederick Williamson, 1933 in Gangtok, Sikkim

Frank Ludlow OBE (10 August 1885 – 25 March 1972) was an English officer stationed in the British Mission at Lhasa and a naturalist.

== Life ==
He was born in Chelsea, London and studied at West Somerset County School and Sidney Sussex College, Cambridge. Ludlow received a Bachelor of Arts from Cambridge in natural sciences in 1908. During this time he studied botany under Professor Marshal Ward, father of Frank Kingdon-Ward. He taught at Sind College Karachi (where he became vice principal and professor of biology and lecturer in English).

During World War I he was commissioned into the Indian Army Reserve of Officers as a Second Lieutenant 22 July 1916 and was attached to the 1st battalion, 97th Deccan Infantry 31 January 1917. He was promoted Lieutenant 22 July 1917.

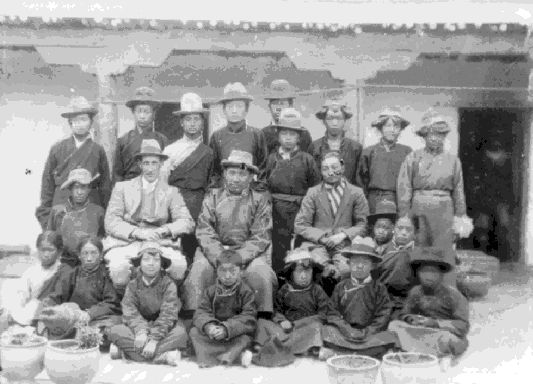
Frank Ludlow with Tibetan students between 1923 and 1926

After the war he went into the Indian Education Service.

In the 1927 Birthday Honours he was appointed an Officer of the Order of the British Empire. In 1927 he retired to Srinagar, Kashmir and travelled extensively in the Himalayas including Tibet and Kashmir. In 1929 he met George Sherriff while staying in Kashgar with the consul general Frederick Williamson. He later took charge of the British Mission in Lhasa from 1942 to 1943. During his time in India he studied natural history and collected birds and botanical specimens. He made expeditions to parts of the Himalayas and Tibet along with George Sherriff (1898-1967).

He collected nearly 7000 bird specimens which are now in the Natural History Museum. The species Alcippe ludlowi, Bhutanitis ludlowi and several other taxa including a subspecies of hedgehog (originally described as Paraechinus ludlowi Thomas) Paraechinus aethiopicus ludlowi Thomas from Hit, Iraq are named after him.

== See also ==
- Branklyn Garden

== Publications ==
- Ludlow, F. (1920) Notes on the nidification of certain birds in Ladak. J. Bombay Nat. Hist. Soc. 27: 141–146.
- Ludlow, F (1940) The Long-tailed Duck (Clangula hyemalis) in Kashmir. J. Bombay Nat. Hist. Soc. 41(3):666.
- Ludlow, F (1915) Mallard breeding in the Karachi Zoo. J. Bombay Nat. Hist. Soc. 23(3):584.
- Ludlow, F (1945) The Persian Ground Chough (Podoces pleskei). J. Bombay Nat. Hist. Soc. 45(2):233-234.
- Ludlow, F (1945) The Whooper Swan (Cygnus cygnus). J. Bombay Nat. Hist. Soc. 45(3):421.
- Ludlow, F (1934) Catching of Chikor [Alectoris graeca chukar (Gray)] in Kashmir. J. Bombay Nat. Hist. Soc. 37(1):222
- Ludlow, F (1928) Dongtse, or stray bird notes from Tibet. J. Bombay Nat. Hist. Soc. 33(1):78-83.
- Ludlow, F (1916) Breeding of the Marbled Teal Marmaronetta angustirostris and other birds at Sonmeani, Baluchistan. J. Bombay Nat. Hist. Soc. 24(2):368-369.
- Ludlow, F; Kinnear, NB (1937) The birds of Bhutan and adjacent territories of Sikkim and Tibet. Ibis 14 1(1):1-46.
- Ludlow, F; Kinnear, NB (1937) The birds of Bhutan and adjacent territories of Sikkim and Tibet. Part II. Ibis 14
- Ludlow, F; Kinnear, NB (1937) The birds of Bhutan and adjacent territories of Sikkim and Tibet. Ibis 14 1(1), 1-46.1(2):249-293.
- Ludlow, F; Kinnear, NB (1937) The birds of Bhutan and adjacent territories of Sikkim and Tibet. Part III. Ibis 14 1(3):467-504.
- Ludlow, F; Kinnear, NB (1933) A contribution to the ornithology of Chinese Turkestan. Part I. Ibis 13 3(2):240-259.
- Ludlow, F; Kinnear, NB (1933) A contribution to the ornithology of Chinese Turkestan. Part II. Ibis 13 3(3):440-473.
- Ludlow, F (1928) Birds of the Gyantse neighbourhood, southern Tibet. Ibis 12 4(2):211-232.
- Ludlow, F; Kinnear, NB (1934) A contribution to the ornithology of Chinese Turkestan. Part IV. Ibis 13 4(1), 95-125.
- Ludlow, F; Kinnear, NB (1940) Systematic notes on Indian birds - V. Ibis, 14 4(1):147-150.
- Ludlow, F; Kinnear, NB (1944) The birds of South-Eastern Tibet. Ibis 86(1):43-86.
- Ludlow, F; Kinnear, NB (1944) The birds of South-Eastern Tibet. Ibis 86(2):176-208.
- Ludlow, F; Kinnear, NB (1944) The birds of South-Eastern Tibet. Ibis 86(3):348-389.
- Ludlow, F (1950) The birds of Lhasa. Ibis 92(1):34-45.
- Ludlow, F (1951) The birds of Kongbo and Pome, South-East Tibet. Ibis 93(4):547-578.
- Ludlow, F; Kinnear, NB (1933) A contribution to the ornithology of Chinese Turkestan. Part III. Ibis, 13(3):658-694.
