= Frederick Williamson =

Frederick Williamson CIE
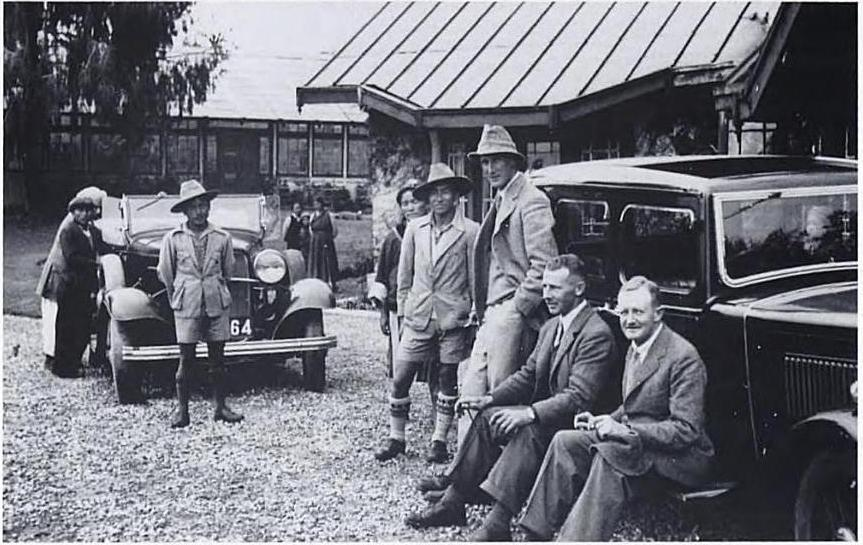
- Frederick Williamson (closest to right)
- Born: 31 January 1891
- Died: 1935
- Known for: Founding member of the Himalayan Club

Frederick Williamson CIE (31 January 1891 – November 1935) was a British Political Officer stationed in Sikkim, Bhutan, and Tibet in the 1930s. He was also an explorer and a founding member of the Himalayan Club. It was 'largely owing to his influence and the esteem in which he was held in Lhasa' that Tibet permitted the 1935 and 1936 Mount Everest Expeditions. His life was cut short by a chronic illness which occurred in Lhasa during November 1935 on a mission to negotiate a settlement between Tibet and Thubten Choekyi Nyima, 9th Panchen Lama. On the announcement of his death, the Government of India stated that 'it robbed the Government of a most valuable officer'.

== Life ==
Williamson was born on 31 January 1891 and educated at Bedford Modern School and Emmanuel College, Cambridge. He entered the Indian Civil Service in 1914, serving in Bihar and Orissa. At the outbreak of World War I, he saw military duty with the Gurkha Rifles in India (1915–16) and Mesopotamia (1916–18) where he was wounded. He saw service in Palestine and Egypt (1918–19) where he was mentioned in despatches.

After World War I he held appointments in Bihar (1919–22), was Secretary to the British Resident of Mysore (1922), and was Secretary to the British Resident of Hyderabad (1923). He later became the British Trade Agent at Gyantse (1924) and Assistant to the Political Officer in Sikkim. His obituary in The Times states that he 'quickly felt the attraction of the romance and mystery' of those lands, and 'in his close study of the customs, folklore, and languages of the people followed in the footsteps of Sir Charles Bell'.

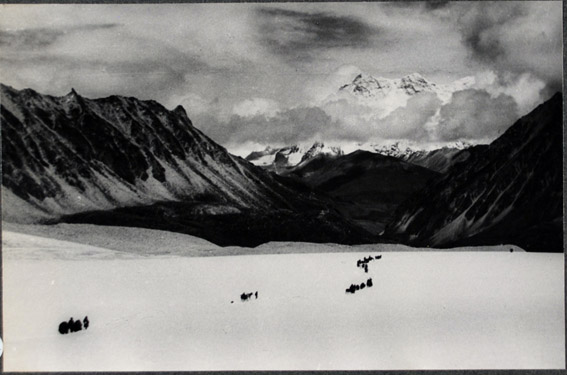
Kula Kangri from Moenla Karchung 1933

In 1926, Williamson was made Officiating Political Officer in Sikkim and, in 1927, Consul-General to Kashgar, a position he held until 1930. In 1931, Williamson returned to Gangtok as Political Officer in Sikkim. His brief life was cut short by a chronic illness which occurred in Lhasa during November 1935 on a mission to negotiate a settlement between Tibet and Thubten Choekyi Nyima, 9th Panchen Lama. On the announcement of his death, the Government of India stated that 'it robbed the Government of a most valuable officer'. His obituary in The Times states that he may well 'have wished nothing better than to end his days where his heart was—amid the eternal snows of Tibet'.

In 1933, Williamson married Margaret Dobie Marshall who had accompanied him on his travels. Margaret Williamson wrote a memoir of their life in Tibet, Sikkim, and Bhutan.

== Explorer ==
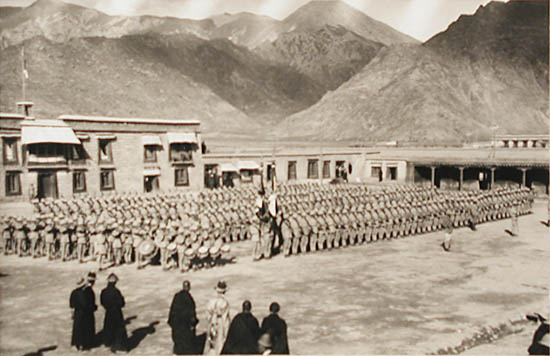
The Trapchi Regiment

A keen explorer, Williamson was a founder member of the Himalayan Club. In Kashgar and Gangtok he explored unknown routes and in 1928 established a new route from Yarkand to the Kara-Tash Valley by way of Kichik Karaul. In 1933 he travelled in Bhutan with his wife, crossing the Great Himalayan range into Tibet via Mon-La-Kar-Chung La, the difficult glacier pass.

It was 'largely owing to his influence and the esteem in which he was held in Lhasa' that Tibet permitted the 1935 and 1936 Mount Everest Expeditions.

On his travels, Williamson and his partner and future wife were prolific photographers. Between December 1930 and August 1935, they took approximately 1700 photographs throughout the Himalayan region. The photographs they took are at the University of Cambridge and are described as 'providing an unusually well-preserved and well-catalogued insight into social life in Sikkim, Bhutan, and Tibet during the 1930s'.
