= 75th United States Congress =

1937–1939 U.S. Congress

←	74th	76th	→
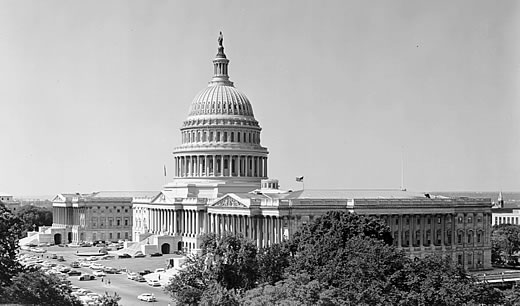
- United States Capitol (1956)

Overview
- Legislative body: United States Congress
- Jurisdiction: United States
- Term: January 3, 1937 – January 3, 1939

Senate
- Members: 96
- President: John N. Garner (D)
- President pro tempore: Key Pittman (D)
- Party control: Democratic

House of Representatives
- Members: 435 representatives 5 non-voting delegates
- Speaker: William B. Bankhead (D)
- Party control: Democratic

Sessions
- 1st: January 5, 1937 – August 21, 1937
- 2nd: November 15, 1937 – December 21, 1937
- 3rd: January 3, 1938 – June 16, 1938

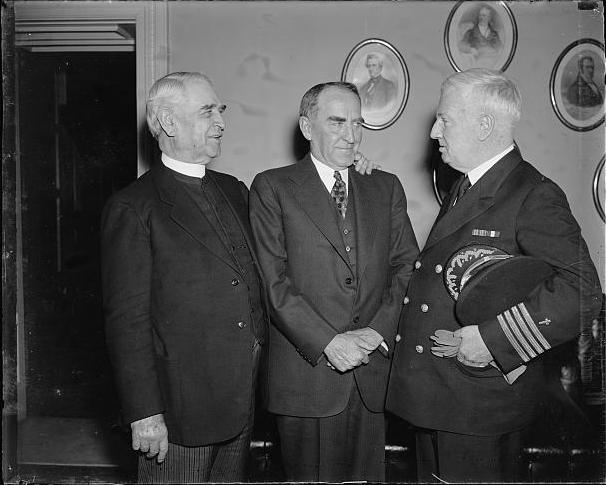
Washington, D.C., March 25, 1937: Navy Chaplain Edward Duff opens the House of Representatives with a prayer for the first time since 1820. It was the first time in 117 years that the Navy was again honored in giving the invocation. Left to right: James S. Montgomery, Chaplain of the House; Speaker William Bankhead; and Capt. Edward A. Duff, Chief of Chaplains U.S. Navy

The 75th United States Congress was a meeting of the legislative branch of the United States federal government, composed of the United States Senate and the United States House of Representatives. It met in Washington, D.C., from January 3, 1937, to January 3, 1939, during the fifth and sixth years of Franklin D. Roosevelt's presidency. (Note: Starting in 1937, the 20th Amendment required new presidential terms to begin 17 days after the new Congress convened.)

The apportionment of seats in the House of Representatives was based on the 1930 United States census.

Both chambers had a Democratic supermajority, with the party increasing their majority in both the House and Senate, and with the reelection of President Roosevelt, maintained an overall federal government trifecta.

This is the most recent Congress to feature a 3/4th majority in the House or Senate by either party.

== Major events ==
- January 20, 1937: President Franklin D. Roosevelt begins his second term.
- February 5, 1937: Roosevelt's court-packing plan proposed
- March 26, 1937: William Henry Hastie becomes the first African-American appointed to a federal judgeship.
- April 12, 1937: National Labor Relations Board v. Jones & Laughlin Steel Corporation: The Supreme Court of the United States ruled the National Labor Relations Act constitutional.
- July 22, 1937: Senate rejects the court-packing plan
- October 5, 1937: Roosevelt delivers the Quarantine Speech

== Major legislation ==
- May 1, 1937: Neutrality Acts of 1937
- June 3, 1937: Agricultural Marketing Agreement Act, ch. 296, 50 Stat. 246
- August 2, 1937: Marihuana Tax Act of 1937 50 Stat. 553
- August 5, 1937: National Cancer Institute Act, Pub. L. 75–244, ch. 565, 50 Stat. 559
- March 21, 1938: Wheeler–Lea Act, ch. 49, 52 Stat. 111
- May 11, 1938: Indian Mineral Leasing Act, ch. 198 52 Stat. 347
- May 24, 1938: La Follette–Bulwinkle Act, ch. 267, 52 Stat. 439
- June 8, 1938: Foreign Agents Registration Act, ch. 327, 52 Stat. 631
- June 21, 1938: Natural Gas Act, ch. 556, 52 Stat. 821
- June 25, 1938: Civil Aeronautics Act, ch. 601, 52 Stat. 973
- June 25, 1938: Fair Labor Standards Act, ch. 676, 52 Stat. 1060
- June 25, 1938: Federal Food, Drug, and Cosmetic Act, ch. 675, 52 Stat. 1040
- June 25, 1938: Wagner-O'Day Act, ch. 697, 52 Stat. 1196

== Party summary ==
=== Senate ===
	Party (shading shows control)					Total	Vacant
	Democratic (D)	Farmer– Labor (F)	Wisconsin Progressive (P)	Republican (R)	Independent (I)	Total	Vacant
End of previous congress	72	1	1	22	0	96	0
Begin	76	2	1	16	1	96	0
End	74	2	1	18	1	96	0
Final voting share	77.1%	2.1%	1.0%	18.8%	1.0%		
Beginning of next congress	69	2	1	23	1	96	0

=== House of Representatives ===
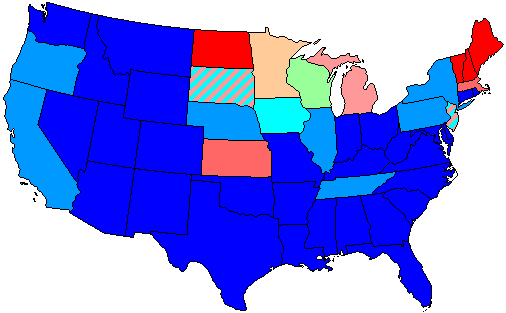
House seats by party holding plurality in state: 80+% to 100% Democratic / 80+% to 100% Republican; 60+% to 80% Democratic / 60+% to 80% Republican; Up to 60% Democratic / Up to 60% Republican

	Party (shading shows control)					Total	Vacant
	Democratic (D)	Farmer– Labor (FL)	Wisconsin Progressive (P)	Republican (R)	Other	Total	Vacant
End of previous congress	308	3	7	100	0	418	17
Begin	333	5	7	89	1	435	0
End	323	5	7	90	1	426	9
Final voting share	75.8%	1.2%	1.6%	21.1%	0.2%		
Beginning of next congress	260	1	2	169	2	434	1

== Leadership ==
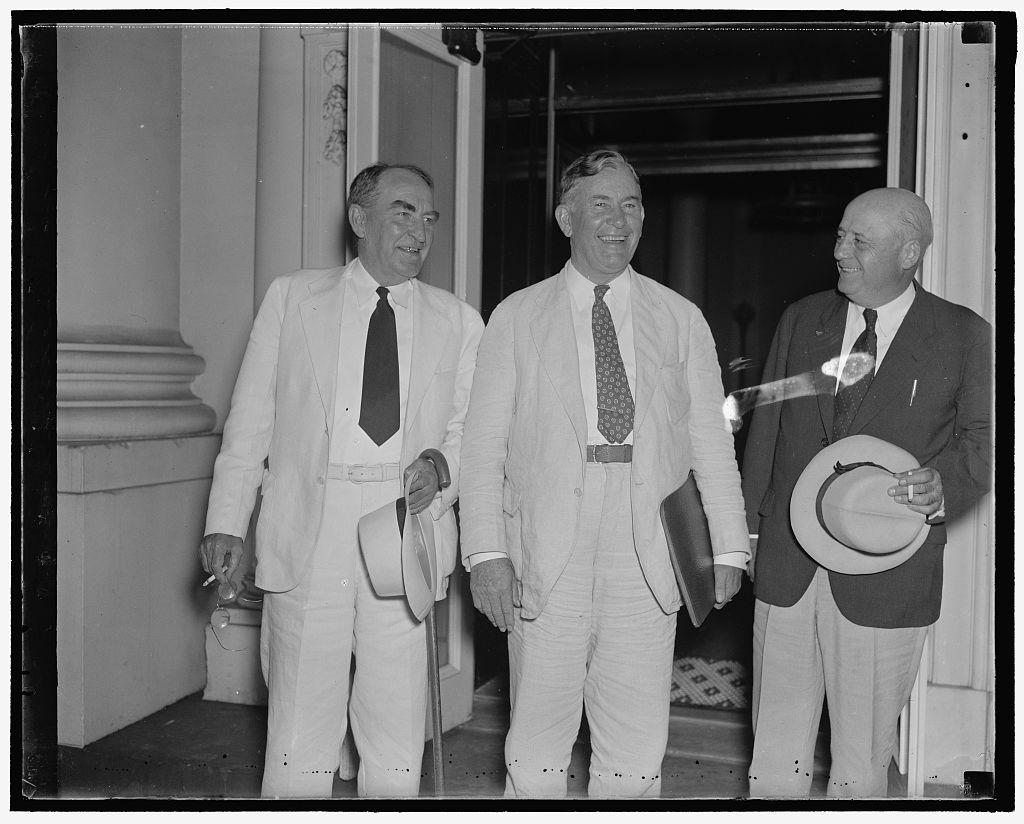
(L-R): House Speaker William Bankhead, Senate Majority Leader Alben Barkley, and House Majority Leader Sam Rayburn

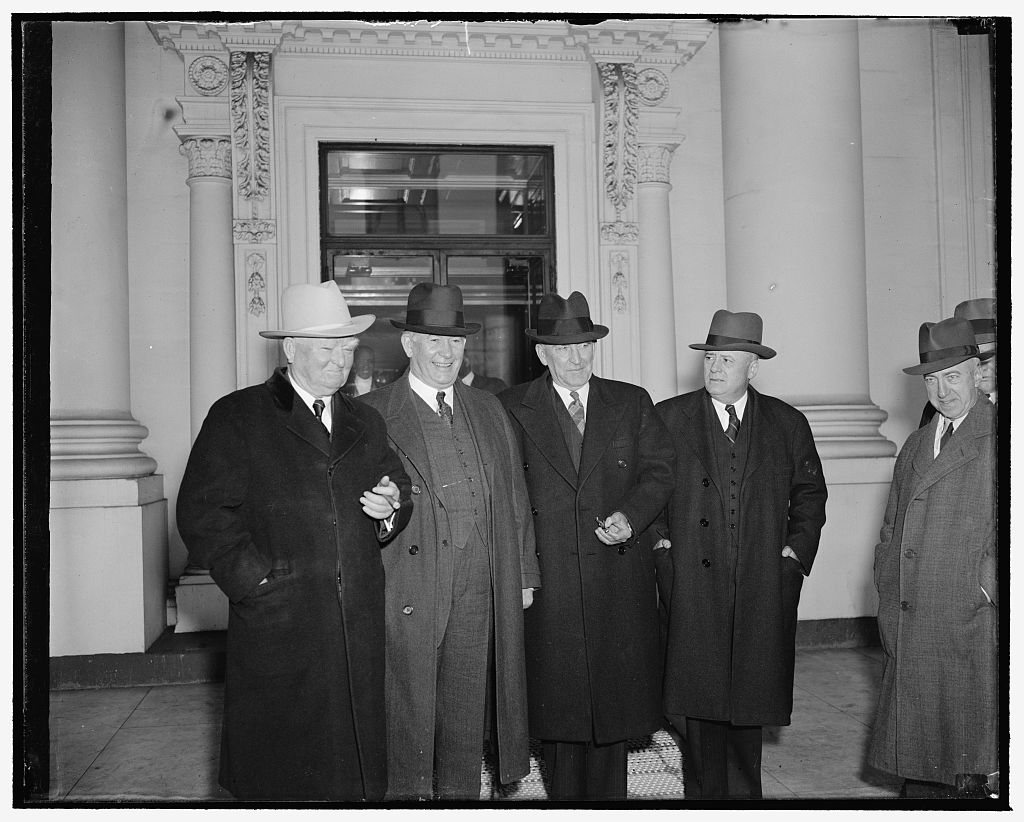
(L-R): Vice President John Nance Garner, Senate Majority Leader Alben Barkley, Speaker of the House William Bankhead, and House Majority Leader Sam Rayburn, January 9, 1939

=== Senate ===
- President: John N. Garner (D)
- President pro tempore: Key Pittman (D)
- Majority Leader: Joseph Taylor Robinson (D), until July 14, 1937
  - Alben W. Barkley (D), from July 14, 1937
- Majority Whip: J. Hamilton Lewis (D)
- Minority Leader: Charles McNary (R)
- Democratic Caucus Secretary: Joshua B. Lee
- Republican Conference Secretary: Frederick Hale
- National Senatorial Committee Chairman: John G. Townsend Jr.

=== House of Representatives ===
- Speaker: William B. Bankhead (D)
- Majority Leader: Sam Rayburn (D)
- Minority Leader: Bertrand Snell (R)
- Democratic Whip: Patrick J. Boland
- Republican Whip: Harry Lane Englebright
- Democratic Caucus Chairman: Robert L. Doughton
- Republican Conference Chairman: Roy O. Woodruff
- Democratic Campaign Committee Chairman: Patrick H. Drewry
- Republican Campaign Committee Chairman: Joseph W. Martin Jr.

== Members ==
=== Senate ===
Senators are popularly elected statewide every two years, with one-third beginning new six-year terms with each Congress. Preceding the names in the list below are Senate class numbers, which indicate the cycle of their election, In this Congress, Class 3 meant their term ended with this Congress, requiring reelection in 1938; Class 1 meant their term began in the last Congress, requiring reelection in 1940; and Class 2 meant their term began in this Congress, requiring reelection in 1942.

==== Alabama ====
▌2. John H. Bankhead II (D)
▌3. Hugo Black (D), until August 19, 1937

▌Dixie Bibb Graves (D), August 20, 1937 - January 10, 1938
▌J. Lister Hill (D), from January 11, 1938

==== Arizona ====
▌1. Henry F. Ashurst (D)
▌3. Carl Hayden (D)

==== Arkansas ====
▌2. Joseph Taylor Robinson (D), until July 14, 1937

▌John E. Miller (D), from November 15, 1937

▌3. Hattie Caraway (D)

==== California ====
▌1. Hiram W. Johnson (R)
▌3. William G. McAdoo (D), until November 8, 1938

▌Thomas M. Storke (D), from November 9, 1938

==== Colorado ====
▌2. Edwin C. Johnson (D)
▌3. Alva B. Adams (D)

==== Connecticut ====
▌1. Francis T. Maloney (D)
▌3. Augustine Lonergan (D)

==== Delaware ====
▌1. John G. Townsend Jr. (R)
▌2. James H. Hughes (D)

==== Florida ====
▌1. Charles O. Andrews (D)
▌3. Claude Pepper (D)

==== Georgia ====
▌2. Richard Russell Jr. (D)
▌3. Walter F. George (D)

==== Idaho ====
▌2. William Borah (R)
▌3. James P. Pope (D)

==== Illinois ====
▌2. J. Hamilton Lewis (D)
▌3. William H. Dieterich (D)

==== Indiana ====
▌1. Sherman Minton (D)
▌3. Frederick Van Nuys (D)

==== Iowa ====
▌2. Clyde L. Herring (D)
▌3. Guy Gillette (D)

==== Kansas ====
▌2. Arthur Capper (R)
▌3. George McGill (D)

==== Kentucky ====
▌2. Marvel M. Logan (D)
▌3. Alben W. Barkley (D)

==== Louisiana ====
▌2. Allen J. Ellender (D)
▌3. John H. Overton (D)

==== Maine ====
▌1. Frederick Hale (R)
▌2. Wallace H. White Jr. (R)

==== Maryland ====
▌1. George L. P. Radcliffe (D)
▌3. Millard Tydings (D)

==== Massachusetts ====
▌1. David I. Walsh (D)
▌2. Henry Cabot Lodge Jr. (R)

==== Michigan ====
▌1. Arthur H. Vandenberg (R)
▌2. Prentiss M. Brown (D)

==== Minnesota ====
▌1. Henrik Shipstead (FL)
▌2. Ernest Lundeen (FL)

==== Mississippi ====
▌1. Theodore G. Bilbo (D)
▌2. Pat Harrison (D)

==== Missouri ====
▌1. Harry S. Truman (D)
▌3. Bennett Champ Clark (D)

==== Montana ====
▌1. Burton K. Wheeler (D)
▌2. James E. Murray (D)

==== Nebraska ====
▌1. Edward R. Burke (D)
▌2. George W. Norris (I)

==== Nevada ====
▌1. Key Pittman (D)
▌3. Pat McCarran (D)

==== New Hampshire ====
▌2. Styles Bridges (R)
▌3. Fred H. Brown (D)

==== New Jersey ====
▌1. A. Harry Moore (D), until January 17, 1938

▌John Gerald Milton (D), January 18, 1938 - November 8, 1938
▌William Warren Barbour (R), from November 8, 1938

▌2. William H. Smathers (D)

==== New Mexico ====
▌1. Dennis Chávez (D)
▌2. Carl Hatch (D)

==== New York ====
▌1. Royal S. Copeland (D), until June 17, 1938

▌James M. Mead (D), from December 3, 1938

▌3. Robert F. Wagner (D)

==== North Carolina ====
▌2. Josiah William Bailey (D)
▌3. Robert R. Reynolds (D)

==== North Dakota ====
▌1. Lynn Frazier (R-NPL)
▌3. Gerald Nye (R)

==== Ohio ====
▌1. A. Victor Donahey (D)
▌3. Robert J. Bulkley (D)

==== Oklahoma ====
▌2. Joshua B. Lee (D)
▌3. Elmer Thomas (D)

==== Oregon ====
▌2. Charles L. McNary (R)
▌3. Frederick Steiwer (R), until January 31, 1938

▌Alfred E. Reames (D), February 1, 1938 – November 8, 1938
▌Alexander G. Barry (R), from November 9, 1938

==== Pennsylvania ====
▌1. Joseph F. Guffey (D)
▌3. James J. Davis (R)

==== Rhode Island ====
▌1. Peter G. Gerry (D)
▌2. Theodore F. Green (D)

==== South Carolina ====
▌2. James F. Byrnes (D)
▌3. Ellison D. Smith (D)

==== South Dakota ====
▌2. William J. Bulow (D)
▌3. Herbert E. Hitchcock (D), until November 8, 1938

▌Gladys Pyle (R), from November 9, 1938

==== Tennessee ====
▌1. Kenneth McKellar (D)
▌2. Nathan L. Bachman (D), until April 23, 1937

▌George L. Berry (D), May 6, 1937 - November 8, 1938
▌Tom Stewart (D), from November 8, 1938

==== Texas ====
▌1. Tom T. Connally (D)
▌2. Morris Sheppard (D)

==== Utah ====
▌1. William H. King (D)
▌3. Elbert D. Thomas (D)

==== Vermont ====
▌1. Warren Austin (R)
▌3. Ernest Willard Gibson (R)

==== Virginia ====
▌1. Harry F. Byrd (D)
▌2. Carter Glass (D)

==== Washington ====
▌1. Lewis B. Schwellenbach (D)
▌3. Homer Bone (D)

==== West Virginia ====
▌1. Rush D. Holt Sr. (D)
▌2. Matthew M. Neely (D)

==== Wisconsin ====
▌1. Robert M. La Follette Jr. (P)
▌3. F. Ryan Duffy (D)

==== Wyoming ====
▌1. Joseph C. O'Mahoney (D)
▌2. Henry H. Schwartz (D)

Senators' party membership by state at the opening of the 75th Congress in January 1937. The green stripes denote Senator Robert M. La Follette Jr. of the Progressive Party, and the yellow stripes denote independent Senator George W. Norris. 2 Democrats 1 Democrat and 1 Republican 2 Republicans 2 Farmer-Laborers

=== House of Representatives ===
The names of representatives are preceded by their district numbers.

==== Alabama ====
▌1. Frank W. Boykin (D)
▌2. J. Lister Hill (D), until January 11, 1938

▌George M. Grant (D), from June 14, 1938

▌3. Henry B. Steagall (D)
▌4. Sam Hobbs (D)
▌5. Joe Starnes (D)
▌6. Pete Jarman (D)
▌7. William B. Bankhead (D)
▌8. John J. Sparkman (D)
▌9. Luther Patrick (D)

==== Arizona ====
▌At-large John R. Murdock (D)

==== Arkansas ====
▌1. William J. Driver (D)
▌2. John E. Miller (D), until November 14, 1937
▌3. Claude A. Fuller (D)
▌4. William B. Cravens (D)
▌5. David D. Terry (D)
▌6. John L. McClellan (D)
▌7. Wade H. Kitchens (D)

==== California ====
▌1. Clarence F. Lea (D)
▌2. Harry L. Englebright (R)
▌3. Frank H. Buck (D)
▌4. Franck R. Havenner (P)
▌5. Richard J. Welch (R)
▌6. Albert E. Carter (R)
▌7. John H. Tolan (D)
▌8. John J. McGrath (D)
▌9. Bertrand W. Gearhart (R)
▌10. Henry E. Stubbs (D), until February 28, 1937

▌Alfred J. Elliott (D), from May 4, 1937

▌11. John S. McGroarty (D)
▌12. Jerry Voorhis (D)
▌13. Charles Kramer (D)
▌14. Thomas F. Ford (D)
▌15. John M. Costello (D)
▌16. John F. Dockweiler (D)
▌17. Charles J. Colden (D), until April 15, 1938
▌18. Byron N. Scott (D)
▌19. Harry R. Sheppard (D)
▌20. Edouard V. M. Izac (D)

==== Colorado ====
▌1. Lawrence Lewis (D)
▌2. Fred N. Cummings (D)
▌3. John A. Martin (D)
▌4. Edward T. Taylor (D)

==== Connecticut ====
▌1. Herman P. Kopplemann (D)
▌2. William J. Fitzgerald (D)
▌3. James A. Shanley (D)
▌4. Alfred N. Phillips (D)
▌5. J. Joseph Smith (D)
▌At-large. William M. Citron (D)

==== Delaware ====
▌At-large. William F. Allen (D)

==== Florida ====
▌1. J. Hardin Peterson (D)
▌2. Robert A. Green (D)
▌3. Millard F. Caldwell (D)
▌4. J. Mark Wilcox (D)
▌5. Joe Hendricks (D)

==== Georgia ====
▌1. Hugh Peterson (D)
▌2. Edward E. Cox (D)
▌3. Stephen Pace (D)
▌4. Emmett M. Owen (D)
▌5. Robert Ramspeck (D)
▌6. Carl Vinson (D)
▌7. Malcolm C. Tarver (D)
▌8. Braswell Deen (D)
▌9. B. Frank Whelchel (D)
▌10. Paul Brown (D)

==== Idaho ====
▌1. Compton I. White (D)
▌2. D. Worth Clark (D)

==== Illinois ====
▌1. Arthur W. Mitchell (D)
▌2. Raymond S. McKeough (D)
▌3. Edward A. Kelly (D)
▌4. Harry P. Beam (D)
▌5. Adolph J. Sabath (D)
▌6. Thomas J. O’Brien (D)
▌7. Leonard W. Schuetz (D)
▌8. Leo Kocialkowski (D)
▌9. James McAndrews (D)
▌10. Ralph E. Church (R)
▌11. Chauncey W. Reed (R)
▌12. Noah M. Mason (R)
▌13. Leo E. Allen (R)
▌14. Chester C. Thompson (D)
▌15. Lewis L. Boyer (D)
▌16. Everett M. Dirksen (R)
▌17. Leslie C. Arends (R)
▌18. James A. Meeks (D)
▌19. Hugh M. Rigney (D)
▌20. Scott W. Lucas (D)
▌21. Frank W. Fries (D)
▌22. Edwin M. Schaefer (D)
▌23. Laurence F. Arnold (D)
▌24. Claude V. Parsons (D)
▌25. Kent E. Keller (D)
▌At-large. Edwin V. Champion (D)
▌At-large. Lewis M. Long (D)

==== Indiana ====
▌1. William T. Schulte (D)
▌2. Charles A. Halleck (R)
▌3. Samuel B. Pettengill (D)
▌4. James I. Farley (D)
▌5. Glenn Griswold (D)
▌6. Virginia E. Jenckes (D)
▌7. Arthur H. Greenwood (D)
▌8. John W. Boehne Jr. (D)
▌9. Eugene B. Crowe (D)
▌10. Finly H. Gray (D)
▌11. William H. Larrabee (D)
▌12. Louis Ludlow (D)

==== Iowa ====
▌1. Edward C. Eicher (D), until December 2, 1938
▌2. William S. Jacobsen (D)
▌3. John W. Gwynne (R)
▌4. Fred Biermann (D)
▌5. Lloyd Thurston (R)
▌6. Cassius C. Dowell (R)
▌7. Otha D. Wearin (D)
▌8. Fred C. Gilchrist (R)
▌9. Vincent F. Harrington (D)

==== Kansas ====
▌1. William P. Lambertson (R)
▌2. Ulysses S. Guyer (R)
▌3. Edward White Patterson (D)
▌4. Edward Herbert Rees (R)
▌5. John Mills Houston (D)
▌6. Frank Carlson (R)
▌7. Clifford R. Hope (R)

==== Kentucky ====
▌1. Noble J. Gregory (D)
▌2. Beverly M. Vincent (D)
▌3. Emmet O'Neal (D)
▌4. Edward W. Creal (D)
▌5. Brent Spence (D)
▌6. Virgil Chapman (D)
▌7. Andrew J. May (D)
▌8. Fred M. Vinson (D), until May 12, 1938

▌Joe B. Bates (D), from June 4, 1938

▌9. John M. Robsion (R)

==== Louisiana ====
▌1. Joachim O. Fernández (D)
▌2. Paul H. Maloney (D)
▌3. Robert L. Mouton (D)
▌4. Overton Brooks (D)
▌5. Newt V. Mills (D)
▌6. John K. Griffith (D)
▌7. René L. DeRouen (D)
▌8. A. Leonard Allen (D)

==== Maine ====
▌1. James C. Oliver (R)
▌2. Clyde H. Smith (R)
▌3. Ralph Owen Brewster (R)

==== Maryland ====
▌1. T. Alan Goldsborough (D)
▌2. William P. Cole Jr. (D)
▌3. Vincent L. Palmisano (D)
▌4. Ambrose J. Kennedy (D)
▌5. Stephen W. Gambrill (D), until December 19, 1938
▌6. David J. Lewis (D)

==== Massachusetts ====
▌1. Allen T. Treadway (R)
▌2. Charles Clason (R)
▌3. Joseph E. Casey (D)
▌4. Pehr G. Holmes (R)
▌5. Edith Nourse Rogers (R)
▌6. George J. Bates (R)
▌7. William P. Connery Jr. (D), until June 15, 1937

▌Lawrence J. Connery (D), from September 28, 1937

▌8. Arthur D. Healey (D)
▌9. Robert Luce (R)
▌10. George H. Tinkham (R)
▌11. John P. Higgins (D), until September 30, 1937

▌Thomas A. Flaherty (D), from December 14, 1937

▌12. John W. McCormack (D)
▌13. Richard B. Wigglesworth (R)
▌14. Joseph W. Martin Jr. (R)
▌15. Charles L. Gifford (R)

==== Michigan ====
▌1. George G. Sadowski (D)
▌2. Earl C. Michener (R)
▌3. Paul W. Shafer (R)
▌4. Clare E. Hoffman (R)
▌5. Carl Mapes (R)
▌6. Andrew J. Transue (D)
▌7. Jesse P. Wolcott (R)
▌8. Fred L. Crawford (R)
▌9. Albert J. Engel (R)
▌10. Roy O. Woodruff (R)
▌11. John F. Luecke (D)
▌12. Frank Hook (D)
▌13. George D. O'Brien (D)
▌14. Louis C. Rabaut (D)
▌15. John D. Dingell Sr. (D)
▌16. John Lesinski Sr. (D)
▌17. George A. Dondero (R)

==== Minnesota ====
▌1. August H. Andresen (R)
▌2. Elmer Ryan (D)
▌3. Henry Teigan (FL)
▌4. Melvin Maas (R)
▌5. Dewey Johnson (FL)
▌6. Harold Knutson (R)
▌7. Paul J. Kvale (FL)
▌8. John Bernard (FL)
▌9. Rich T. Buckler (FL)

==== Mississippi ====
▌1. John E. Rankin (D)
▌2. Wall Doxey (D)
▌3. William M. Whittington (D)
▌4. Aaron L. Ford (D)
▌5. Ross A. Collins (D)
▌6. William M. Colmer (D)
▌7. Dan R. McGehee (D)

==== Missouri ====
▌1. Milton A. Romjue (D)
▌2. William L. Nelson (D)
▌3. Richard M. Duncan (D)
▌4. C. Jasper Bell (D)
▌5. Joseph B. Shannon (D)
▌6. Reuben T. Wood (D)
▌7. Dewey Short (R)
▌8. Clyde Williams (D)
▌9. Clarence Cannon (D)
▌10. Orville Zimmerman (D)
▌11. Thomas C. Hennings Jr. (D)
▌12. Charles Arthur Anderson (D)
▌13. John J. Cochran (D)

==== Montana ====
▌1. Jerry J. O'Connell (D)
▌2. James F. O'Connor (D)

==== Nebraska ====
▌1. Henry Carl Luckey (D)
▌2. Charles F. McLaughlin (D)
▌3. Karl Stefan (R)
▌4. Charles Gustav Binderup (D)
▌5. Harry B. Coffee (D)

==== Nevada ====
▌At-large. James G. Scrugham (D)

==== New Hampshire ====
▌1. Arthur B. Jenks (R), until June 9, 1938

▌Alphonse Roy (D), from June 9, 1938

▌2. Charles W. Tobey (R)

==== New Jersey ====
▌1. Charles A. Wolverton (R)
▌2. Elmer H. Wene (D)
▌3. William H. Sutphin (D)
▌4. D. Lane Powers (R)
▌5. Charles A. Eaton (R)
▌6. Donald H. McLean (R)
▌7. J. Parnell Thomas (R)
▌8. George N. Seger (R)
▌9. Edward A. Kenney (D), until January 27, 1938
▌10. Fred A. Hartley Jr. (R)
▌11. Edward L. O'Neill (D)
▌12. Frank William Towey Jr. (D)
▌13. Mary T. Norton (D)
▌14. Edward J. Hart (D)

==== New Mexico ====
▌At-large. John J. Dempsey (D)

==== New York ====
▌1. Robert L. Bacon (R), until September 12, 1938
▌2. William B. Barry (D)
▌3. Joseph L. Pfeifer (D)
▌4. Thomas H. Cullen (D)
▌5. Marcellus H. Evans (D)
▌6. Andrew L. Somers (D)
▌7. John J. Delaney (D)
▌8. Donald L. O'Toole (D)
▌9. Eugene J. Keogh (D)
▌10. Emanuel Celler (D)
▌11. James A. O'Leary (D)
▌12. Samuel Dickstein (D)
▌13. Christopher D. Sullivan (D)
▌14. William I. Sirovich (D)
▌15. John J. Boylan (D), until October 5, 1938
▌▌16. John J. O'Connor (D), switched to (R) October 24, 1938
▌17. Theodore A. Peyser (D), until August 8, 1937

▌Bruce F. Barton (R), from November 2, 1937

▌18. Martin J. Kennedy (D)
▌19. Sol Bloom (D)
▌20. James J. Lanzetta (D)
▌21. Joseph A. Gavagan (D)
▌22. Edward W. Curley (D)
▌23. Charles A. Buckley (D)
▌24. James M. Fitzpatrick (D)
▌25. Charles D. Millard (R), until September 29, 1937

▌Ralph A. Gamble (R), from November 2, 1937

▌26. Hamilton Fish III (R)
▌27. Philip A. Goodwin (R), until June 6, 1937

▌Lewis K. Rockefeller (R), from November 2, 1937

▌28. William T. Byrne (D)
▌29. E. Harold Cluett (R)
▌30. Frank Crowther (R)
▌31. Bertrand H. Snell (R)
▌32. Francis D. Culkin (R)
▌33. Fred J. Douglas (R)
▌34. Bert Lord (R)
▌35. Clarence E. Hancock (R)
▌36. John Taber (R)
▌37. W. Sterling Cole (R)
▌38. George B. Kelly (D)
▌39. James W. Wadsworth Jr. (R)
▌40. Walter G. Andrews (R)
▌41. Alfred F. Beiter (D)
▌42. James M. Mead (D), until December 2, 1938
▌43. Daniel A. Reed (R)
▌At-large. Matthew J. Merritt (D)
▌At-large. Caroline O'Day (D)

==== North Carolina ====
▌1. Lindsay C. Warren (D)
▌2. John H. Kerr (D)
▌3. Graham A. Barden (D)
▌4. Harold D. Cooley (D)
▌5. Franklin W. Hancock Jr. (D)
▌6. William B. Umstead (D)
▌7. J. Bayard Clark (D)
▌8. J. Walter Lambeth (D)
▌9. Robert L. Doughton (D)
▌10. Alfred L. Bulwinkle (D)
▌11. Zebulon Weaver (D)

==== North Dakota ====
▌At-large. William Lemke (R-NPL)
▌At-large. Usher L. Burdick (R-NPL)

==== Ohio ====
▌1. Joseph A. Dixon (D)
▌2. Herbert S. Bigelow (D)
▌3. Byron B. Harlan (D)
▌4. Frank Le Blond Kloeb (D), until August 19, 1937

▌Walter H. Albaugh (R), from November 8, 1938

▌5. Frank C. Kniffin (D)
▌6. James G. Polk (D)
▌7. Arthur W. Aleshire (D)
▌8. Thomas B. Fletcher (D)
▌9. John F. Hunter (D)
▌10. Thomas A. Jenkins (R)
▌11. Harold K. Claypool (D)
▌12. Arthur P. Lamneck (D)
▌13. Dudley A. White (R)
▌14. Dow W. Harter (D)
▌15. Robert T. Secrest (D)
▌16. William R. Thom (D)
▌17. William A. Ashbrook (D)
▌18. Lawrence E. Imhoff (D)
▌19. Michael J. Kirwan (D)
▌20. Martin L. Sweeney (D)
▌21. Robert Crosser (D)
▌22. Anthony A. Fleger (D)
▌At-large. John McSweeney (D)
▌At-large. Harold G. Mosier (D)

==== Oklahoma ====
▌1. Wesley E. Disney (D)
▌2. John Conover Nichols (D)
▌3. Wilburn Cartwright (D)
▌4. Lyle Boren (D)
▌5. Robert P. Hill (D), until October 29, 1937

▌Gomer Griffith Smith (D), from December 10, 1937

▌6. Jed J. Johnson (D)
▌7. Sam C. Massingale (D)
▌8. Phil Ferguson (D)
▌At-large. Will Rogers (D)

==== Oregon ====
▌1. James W. Mott (R)
▌2. Walter M. Pierce (D)
▌3. Nan Wood Honeyman (D)

==== Pennsylvania ====
▌1. Leon Sacks (D)
▌2. James P. McGranery (D)
▌3. Michael J. Bradley (D)
▌4. J. Burrwood Daly (D)
▌5. Frank J. G. Dorsey (D)
▌6. Michael J. Stack (D)
▌7. Ira W. Drew (D)
▌8. James Wolfenden (R)
▌9. Oliver Walter Frey (D)
▌10. J. Roland Kinzer (R)
▌11. Patrick J. Boland (D)
▌12. J. Harold Flannery (D)
▌13. James H. Gildea (D)
▌14. Guy L. Moser (D)
▌15. Albert G. Rutherford (R)
▌16. Robert F. Rich (R)
▌17. J. William Ditter (R)
▌18. Benjamin Kurtz Focht (R), until March 27, 1937

▌Richard M. Simpson (R), from May 11, 1937

▌19. Guy J. Swope (D)
▌20. Benjamin Jarrett (R)
▌21. Francis E. Walter (D)
▌22. Harry L. Haines (D)
▌23. Don Gingery (D)
▌24. J. Buell Snyder (D)
▌25. Charles I. Faddis (D)
▌26. Charles R. Eckert (D)
▌27. Joseph Gray (D)
▌28. Robert G. Allen (D)
▌29. Charles N. Crosby (D)
▌30. Peter J. De Muth (D)
▌31. James L. Quinn (D)
▌32. Herman P. Eberharter (D)
▌33. Henry Ellenbogen (D), until January 3, 1938
▌34. Matthew A. Dunn (D)

==== Rhode Island ====
▌1. Aime Forand (D)
▌2. John M. O'Connell (D)

==== South Carolina ====
▌1. Thomas S. McMillan (D)
▌2. Hampton P. Fulmer (D)
▌3. John C. Taylor (D)
▌4. Gabriel H. Mahon Jr. (D)
▌5. James P. Richards (D)
▌6. Allard H. Gasque (D), until June 17, 1938

▌Elizabeth Hawley Gasque (D), from September 13, 1938

==== South Dakota ====
▌1. Fred H. Hildebrandt (D)
▌2. Francis Case (R)

==== Tennessee ====
▌1. B. Carroll Reece (R)
▌2. J. Will Taylor (R)
▌3. Samuel D. McReynolds (D)
▌4. John Ridley Mitchell (D)
▌5. Richard Merrill Atkinson (D)
▌6. Clarence W. Turner (D)
▌7. Herron C. Pearson (D)
▌8. Jere Cooper (D)
▌9. Walter Chandler (D)

==== Texas ====
▌1. Wright Patman (D)
▌2. Martin Dies Jr. (D)
▌3. Morgan G. Sanders (D)
▌4. Sam Rayburn (D)
▌5. Hatton W. Sumners (D)
▌6. Luther A. Johnson (D)
▌7. Nat Patton (D)
▌8. Albert Thomas (D)
▌9. Joseph J. Mansfield (D)
▌10. James P. Buchanan (D), until February 22, 1937

▌Lyndon B. Johnson (D), from April 10, 1937

▌11. William R. Poage (D)
▌12. Fritz G. Lanham (D)
▌13. William D. McFarlane (D)
▌14. Richard M. Kleberg (D)
▌15. Milton H. West (D)
▌16. R. Ewing Thomason (D)
▌17. Clyde L. Garrett (D)
▌18. John Marvin Jones (D)
▌19. George H. Mahon (D)
▌20. Maury Maverick (D)
▌21. Charles L. South (D)

==== Utah ====
▌1. Abe Murdock (D)
▌2. J. W. Robinson (D)

==== Vermont ====
▌At-large. Charles A. Plumley (R)

==== Virginia ====
▌1. S. Otis Bland (D)
▌2. Norman R. Hamilton (D)
▌3. Andrew Jackson Montague (D), until January 24, 1937

▌Dave E. Satterfield Jr. (D), from November 2, 1937

▌4. Patrick H. Drewry (D)
▌5. Thomas G. Burch (D)
▌6. Clifton A. Woodrum (D)
▌7. A. Willis Robertson (D)
▌8. Howard W. Smith (D)
▌9. John W. Flannagan Jr. (D)

==== Washington ====
▌1. Warren G. Magnuson (D)
▌2. Monrad C. Wallgren (D)
▌3. Martin F. Smith (D)
▌4. Knute Hill (D)
▌5. Charles H. Leavy (D)
▌6. John M. Coffee (D)

==== West Virginia ====
▌1. Robert L. Ramsay (D)
▌2. Jennings Randolph (D)
▌3. Andrew Edmiston Jr. (D)
▌4. George William Johnson (D)
▌5. John Kee (D)
▌6. Joe L. Smith (D)

==== Wisconsin ====
▌1. Thomas Ryum Amlie (P)
▌2. Harry Sauthoff (P)
▌3. Gardner R. Withrow (P)
▌4. Raymond Joseph Cannon (D)
▌5. Thomas David Patrick O'Malley (D)
▌6. Michael K. Reilly (D)
▌7. Gerald J. Boileau (P)
▌8. George J. Schneider (P)
▌9. Merlin Hull (P)
▌10. Bernard J. Gehrmann (P)

==== Wyoming ====
▌At-large. Paul Ranous Greever (D)

==== Non-voting members ====
▌Alaska Territory. Anthony J. Dimond (D)
▌Hawaii Territory. Samuel Wilder King (R)
▌Philippines. Quintín Paredes (Resident Commissioner) (Nac.), until September 29, 1938

▌Joaquín Miguel Elizalde (Resident Commissioner) (Nac.), from September 29, 1938

▌Puerto Rico. Santiago Iglesias (Resident Commissioner) (Coalitionist)

== Changes in membership ==
The count below reflects changes from the beginning of this Congress.

=== Senate ===
Senate changes
State (class)	Vacated by	Reason for change	Successor	Date of successor's formal installation (Note: When seated or oath administered, not necessarily when service began.)
Tennessee (2)	Nathan L. Bachman (D)	Died April 23, 1937. Successor appointed to continue the term.	George L. Berry (D)	May 6, 1937
Arkansas (2)	Joseph T. Robinson (D)	Died July 14, 1937. Successor elected October 19, 1937.	John E. Miller (D)	November 15, 1937
Alabama (3)	Hugo Black (D)	Resigned August 19, 1937, after being appointed Associate Justice of the Supreme Court of the United States. Successor appointed to continue the term.	Dixie Bibb Graves (D)	August 20, 1937
Alabama (3)	Dixie Bibb Graves (D)	Resigned January 10, 1938, after successor elected.	J. Lister Hill (D)	January 11, 1938
New Jersey (1)	A. Harry Moore (D)	Resigned January 17, 1938, after being elected Governor of New Jersey. Successor appointed to continue the term.	John G. Milton (D)	January 18, 1938
Oregon (3)	Frederick Steiwer (R)	Resigned January 31, 1938, due to poor health. Successor appointed to continue the term.	Alfred E. Reames (D)	February 1, 1938
New York (1)	Royal S. Copeland (D)	Died June 17, 1938. Successor elected November 8, 1938.	James M. Mead (D)	December 3, 1938
California (3)	William G. McAdoo (D)	Resigned November 8, 1938, after losing nomination for upcoming term. Successor appointed to continue the term.	Thomas M. Storke (D)	November 9, 1938
New Jersey (1)	John G. Milton (D)	Interim appointee retired when successor elected. Successor elected November 8, 1938.	William W. Barbour (R)	November 9, 1938
Oregon (3)	Alfred E. Reames (D)	Interim appointee retired when successor elected. Successor elected November 8, 1938.	Alexander G. Barry (R)	November 9, 1938
South Dakota (3)	Herbert E. Hitchcock (D)	Interim appointee lost nomination to finish the term. Successor elected November 8, 1938.	Gladys Pyle (R)	November 9, 1938
Tennessee (2)	George L. Berry (D)	Interim appointee lost nomination to finish the term. Successor elected November 8, 1938.	Tom Stewart (D)	November 9, 1938.

=== House of Representatives ===
House changes
District	Vacated by	Reason for change	Successor	Date of successor's formal installation
Virginia 3	Andrew Jackson Montague (D)	Died January 24, 1937.	Dave E. Satterfield Jr. (D)	November 2, 1937
Texas 10	James P. Buchanan (D)	Died February 22, 1937.	Lyndon B. Johnson (D)	April 10, 1937
California 10	Henry E. Stubbs (D)	Died February 28, 1937.	Alfred J. Elliott (D)	May 4, 1937
Pennsylvania 18	Benjamin K. Focht (R)	Died March 27, 1937.	Richard M. Simpson (R)	May 11, 1937
New York 27	Philip A. Goodwin (R)	Died June 6, 1937.	Lewis K. Rockefeller (R)	November 2, 1937
Massachusetts 7	William P. Connery Jr. (D)	Died June 15, 1937.	Lawrence J. Connery (D)	September 28, 1937
New York 17	Theodore A. Peyser (D)	Died August 8, 1937.	Bruce F. Barton (R)	November 2, 1937
Ohio 4	Frank Le Blond Kloeb (D)	Resigned August 19, 1937, to become justice of United States District Court for the Northern District of Ohio.	Walter H. Albaugh (R)	November 8, 1938
New York 25	Charles D. Millard (R)	Resigned September 29, 1937, to become surrogate of Westchester County, New York.	Ralph A. Gamble (R)	November 2, 1937
Massachusetts 11	John P. Higgins (D)	Resigned September 30, 1937, to become chief justice of the Massachusetts Superior Court.	Thomas A. Flaherty (D)	December 14, 1937
Oklahoma 5	Robert P. Hill (D)	Died October 29, 1937.	Gomer Griffith Smith (D)	December 10, 1937
Arkansas 2	John E. Miller (D)	Resigned November 14, 1937, to become U.S. senator.	Vacant until the next Congress	
Pennsylvania 33	Henry Ellenbogen (D)	Resigned January 3, 1938, to become judge of Common Pleas of Allegheny County, Pennsylvania.	Vacant until the next Congress	
Alabama 2	J. Lister Hill (D)	Resigned January 11, 1938, to become U.S. senator.	George M. Grant (D)	June 14, 1938
New Jersey 9	Edward A. Kenney (D)	Died January 27, 1938.	Vacant until the next Congress	
California 17	Charles J. Colden (D)	Died April 15, 1938.	Vacant until the next Congress	
Kentucky 8	Fred M. Vinson (D)	Resigned May 27, 1938, to become associate justice of the United States Court of Appeals for the District of Columbia Circuit.	Joe B. Bates (D)	June 4, 1938
New Hampshire 1	Arthur B. Jenks (R)	Lost contested election June 9, 1938	Alphonse Roy (D)	June 9, 1938
South Carolina 6	Allard H. Gasque (D)	Died June 17, 1938.	Elizabeth Hawley Gasque (D)	September 13, 1937
New York 1	Robert L. Bacon (R)	Died September 12, 1938.	Vacant until the next Congress	
Resident Commissioner of the Philippines	Quintin Paredes (NAC)	Resigned September 29, 1938.	Joaquín Miguel Elizalde (NAC)	September 29, 1938
New York 15	John J. Boylan (D)	Died October 5, 1938.	Vacant until the next Congress	
New York 16	John J. O'Connor (D)	Changed party affiliation October 24, 1938.	John J. O'Connor (R)	October 24, 1938
Iowa 1	Edward C. Eicher (D)	Resigned December 2, 1938, to become commissioner to the Securities and Exchange Commission.	Vacant until the next Congress	
New York 42	James M. Mead (D)	Resigned December 2, 1938, after being elected to the U.S. Senate.	Vacant until the next Congress	
Maryland 5	Stephen W. Gambrill (D)	Died December 19, 1938.	Vacant until the next Congress	

== Committees ==
Lists of committees and their party leaders for members of the House and Senate committees can be found through the Official Congressional Directory at the bottom of this article. The directory after the pages of terms of service lists committees of the Senate, House (Standing with Subcommittees, Select and Special) and Joint and, after that, House/Senate committee assignments. On the committees section of the House and Senate in the Official Congressional Directory, the committee's members on the first row on the left side shows the chairman of the committee and on the right side shows the ranking member of the committee.

=== Senate ===
- Agriculture and Forestry (Chairman: Ellison D. Smith; Ranking Member: George W. Norris)
- Aquatic Life (Special)
- Appropriations (Chairman: Carter Glass; Ranking Member: Frederick Hale)
- Audit and Control the Contingent Expenses of the Senate (Chairman: James F. Byrnes; Ranking Member: John G. Townsend Jr.)
- Banking and Currency (Chairman: Robert F. Wagner; Ranking Member: John G. Townsend Jr.)
- Campaign Expenditures Investigation (Special) (Chairman: Augustine Lonergan)
- Civil Service (Chairman: William J. Bulow; Ranking Member: Wallace H. White Jr.)
- Civil Service Laws (Special)
- Civil Service System (Special)
- Claims (Chairman: Josiah W. Bailey; Ranking Member: Arthur Capper)
- Commerce (Chairman: Royal S. Copeland; Ranking Member: Charles L. McNary)
- Court Reorganization and Judicial Procedure (Special)
- District of Columbia (Chairman: William H. King; Ranking Member: Arthur Capper)
- Education and Labor (Chairman: Elbert D. Thomas; Ranking Member: William E. Borah)
  - Investigation Violations of Free Speech and the Rights of Labor
- Enrolled Bills (Chairman: Hattie W. Caraway; Ranking Member: Arthur H. Vandenberg)
- Executive Agencies of the Government (Select)
- Expenditures in Executive Departments (Chairman: J. Hamilton Lewis; Ranking Member: James J. Davis)
- Finance (Chairman: Pat Harrison; Ranking Member: Robert M. La Follette Jr.)
- Foreign Relations (Chairman: Key Pittman; Ranking Member: William E. Borah)
- Government Organization (Select)
- Immigration (Chairman: Richard B. Russell; Ranking Member: Hiram W. Johnson)
- Indian Affairs (Chairman: Elmer Thomas; Ranking Member: Lynn J. Frazier)
- Insular Affairs (Chairman: Leo Kocialkowski; Ranking Member: N/A)
- Interoceanic Canals (Chairman: N/A; Ranking Member: N/A)
- Interstate Commerce (Chairman: Burton K. Wheeler; Ranking Member: Wallace H. White Jr.)
- Irrigation and Reclamation (Chairman: John H. Bankhead II; Ranking Member: Charles L. McNary)
- Judiciary (Chairman: Henry F. Ashurst; Ranking Member: William E. Borah)
- Library (Chairman: Alben W. Barkley; Ranking Member: Ernest W. Gibson)
- Lobbying Activities (Select)
- Manufactures (Chairman: Robert J. Bulkley; Ranking Member: Robert M. La Follette Jr.)
- Military Affairs (Chairman: Morris Sheppard; Ranking Member: Warren R. Austin)
- Mines and Mining (Chairman: M.M. Logan; Ranking Member: Lynn J. Frazier)
- Mississippi Flood Control Project (Select) (Chairman: Robert F. Wagner)
- Merchant Marine (Special)
- Naval Affairs (Chairman: David I. Walsh; Ranking Member: Frederick Hale)
- Patents (Chairman: William Gibbs McAdoo; Ranking Member: George W. Norris)
- Pensions (Chairman: George McGill; Ranking Member: Lynn J. Frazier)
- Post Office and Post Roads (Chairman: Kenneth McKellar; Ranking Member: Lynn J. Frazier)
- Printing (Chairman: J. Walter Lambeth; Ranking Member: Arthur H. Vandenberg)
- Privileges and Elections (Chairman: Walter F. George; Ranking Member: Warren R. Austin)
- Public Buildings and Grounds (Chairman: Tom Connally; Ranking Member: Warren R. Austin)
- Public Lands and Surveys (Chairman: Alva B. Adams; Ranking Member: Gerald P. Nye)
- Rules (Chairman: Matthew M. Neely; Ranking Member: Frederick Hale)
- Senatorial Campaign Expenditures (Special)
- Taxation of Government Securities and Salaries (Special)
- Territories and Insular Affairs (Chairman: Millard E. Tydings; Ranking Member: Gerald P. Nye)
- Unemployment and Relief (Select)
- Whole
- Wildlife Resources (Special) (Chairman: Vacant; Ranking Member: Key Pittman)
- Wool Production (Special) (Chairman: Alva B. Adams)

=== House of Representatives ===
- Accounts (Chairman: Lindsay C. Warren; Ranking Member: James Wolfenden)
- Agriculture (Chairman: J. Marvin Jones; Ranking Member: Clifford R. Hope)
- Appropriations (Chairman: Edward T. Taylor; Ranking Member: John Taber)
- Banking and Currency (Chairman: Henry B. Steagall; Ranking Member: Jesse P. Wolcott)
- Census (Chairman: William H. Larrabee; Ranking Member: J. Roland Kinzer)
- Civil Service (Chairman: Robert Ramspeck; Ranking Member: Edith Nourse Rogers)
- Claims (Chairman: Ambrose J. Kennedy; Ranking Member: Ulysses S. Guyer)
- Coinage, Weights and Measures (Chairman: Andrew Somers; Ranking Member: Lloyd Thurston)
- Conservation of Wildlife Resources (Select) (Chairman: A. Willis Robertson)
- Disposition of Executive Papers (Chairman: Charles J. Colden; Ranking Member: Bertrand W. Gearhart)
- District of Columbia (Chairman: Vincent L. Palmisano; Ranking Member: Everett M. Dirksen)
- Education (Chairman: William H. Larrabee; Ranking Member: Albert E. Carter)
- Election of the President, Vice President and Representatives in Congress (Chairman: Caroline O'Day; Ranking Member: George H. Tinkham)
- Elections No.#1 (Chairman: N/A; Ranking Member: Clarence E. Hancock)
- Elections No.#2 (Chairman: Joseph H. Gavagan; Ranking Member: Ulysses S. Guyer)
- Elections No.#3 (Chairman: John H. Kerr; Ranking Member: Charles L. Gifford)
- Enrolled Bills (Chairman: Claude V. Parsons; Ranking Member: Charles Aubrey Eaton)
- Expenditures in the Executive Departments (Chairman: John J. Cochran; Ranking Member: Charles L. Gifford)
- Flood Control (Chairman: William M. Whittington; Ranking Member: Robert F. Rich)
- Foreign Affairs (Chairman: Sam D. McReynolds; Ranking Member: Hamilton Fish III)
- Government Organization (Select) (Chairman: N/A)
- Immigration and Naturalization (Chairman: Samuel Dickstein; Ranking Member: J. Will Taylor)
- Indian Affairs (Chairman: Will Rogers; Ranking Member: Fred C. Gilchrist)
- Insular Affairs (Chairman: Leo Kocialkowski; Ranking Member: Lloyd Thurston)
- Interstate and Foreign Commerce (Chairman: Clarence F. Lea; Ranking Member: Carl E. Mapes)
- Invalid Pensions (Chairman: John Lesinski; Ranking Member: Charles D. Millard)
- Investigate Real Estate Beholder's Reorganizations (Select) (Chairman: N/A)
- Irrigation and Reclamation (Chairman: Compton I. White; Ranking Member: Fred A. Hartley Jr.)
- Judiciary (Chairman: Hatton W. Sumners; Ranking Member: Ulysses S. Guyer)
- Labor (Chairman: Mary Teresa Norton; Ranking Member: Richard J. Welch)
- Library (Chairman: Kent E. Keller; Ranking Member: Allen T. Treadway)
- Memorials (Chairman: Pete Jarman; Ranking Member: Frank Crowther)
- Merchant Marine and Fisheries (Chairman: S. Otis Bland; Ranking Member: Richard J. Welch)
- Military Affairs (Chairman: Andrew J. May; Ranking Member: Walter G. Andrews)
- Mines and Mining (Chairman: Joe L. Smith; Ranking Member: Harry Lane Englebright)
- Naval Affairs (Chairman: Carl Vinson; Ranking Member: Charles D. Millard)
- Patents (Chairman: William I. Sirovich; Ranking Member: Fred A. Hartley Jr.)
- Pensions (Chairman: Allard H. Gasque; Ranking Member: Walter G. Andrews)
- Post Office and Post Roads (Chairman: James M. Mead; Ranking Member: Fred A. Hartley Jr.)
- Printing (Chairman: J. Walter Lambeth; Ranking Member: Robert F. Rich)
- Public Buildings and Grounds (Chairman: Fritz G. Lanham; Ranking Member: J. Will Taylor)
- Public Lands (Chairman: René L. De Rouen; Ranking Member: Harry Lane Englebright)
- Revision of Laws (Chairman: Raymond J. Cannon; Ranking Member: Jesse P. Wolcott)
- Rivers and Harbors (Chairman: Joseph J. Mansfield; Ranking Member: George N. Seger)
- Roads (Chairman: Wilburn Cartwright; Ranking Member: Jesse P. Wolcott)
- Rules (Chairman: John J. O'Connor; Ranking Member: Joseph W. Martin Jr.)
- Standards of Official Conduct
- Territories (Chairman: Robert A. Green; Ranking Member: Harry Lane Englebright)
- War Claims (Chairman: Alfred Beiter; Ranking Member: Benjamin K. Focht)
- Ways and Means (Chairman: Robert L. Doughton; Ranking Member: Allen T. Treadway)
- World War Veterans' Legislation (Chairman: John E. Rankin; Ranking Member: Edith Nourse Rogers)
- Whole

=== Joint committees ===
- Conditions of Indian Tribes (Special)
- Disposition of (Useless) Executive Papers
- Forestry (Chairman: Sen. John H. Bankhead II)
- Government Organization
- Hawaii
- The Library (Chairman: Sen. Alben W. Barkley)
- To Investigate Phosphate Resource of the United States
- Printing (Chairman: Sen. Carl Hayden; Vice Chairman: Rep. J. Walter Lambeth)
- Taxation (Chairman: Sen. Pat Harrison; Vice Chairman: Rep. Robert L. Doughton)
- Tax Evasion and Avoidance
- Tennessee Valley Authority

== Caucuses ==
- Democratic (House)
- Democratic (Senate)

== Employees ==
=== Legislative branch agency directors ===
- Architect of the Capitol: David Lynn
- Attending Physician of the United States Congress: George Calver
- Librarian of Congress: Herbert Putnam
- Public Printer of the United States: Augustus E. Giegengack

=== Senate ===
- Chaplain: Reverend ZeBarney Thorne Phillips (Episcopalian)
- Parliamentarian: Charles L. Watkins
- Secretary: Edwin Alexander Halsey
- Librarian: Ruskin McArdle
- Sergeant at Arms: Chesley W. Jurney
- Democratic Party Secretary: Leslie Biffle
- Republican Party Secretary: Carl A. Loeffler

=== House of Representatives ===
- Chaplain: James Shera Montgomery (Methodist)
- Clerk: South Trimble
- Doorkeeper: Joseph J. Sinnott
- Parliamentarian: Lewis Deschler
- Postmaster: Finis E. Scott
- Reading Clerks: Roger M. Calloway (D) and Alney E. Chaffee (R)
- Sergeant at Arms: Kenneth Romney

== See also ==
- 1936 United States elections (elections leading to this Congress)
  - 1936 United States presidential election
  - 1936 United States Senate elections
  - 1936 United States House of Representatives elections
- 1938 United States elections (elections during this Congress, leading to the next Congress)
  - 1938 United States Senate elections
  - 1938 United States House of Representatives elections
