= List of United States senators from Oregon =

Current delegation

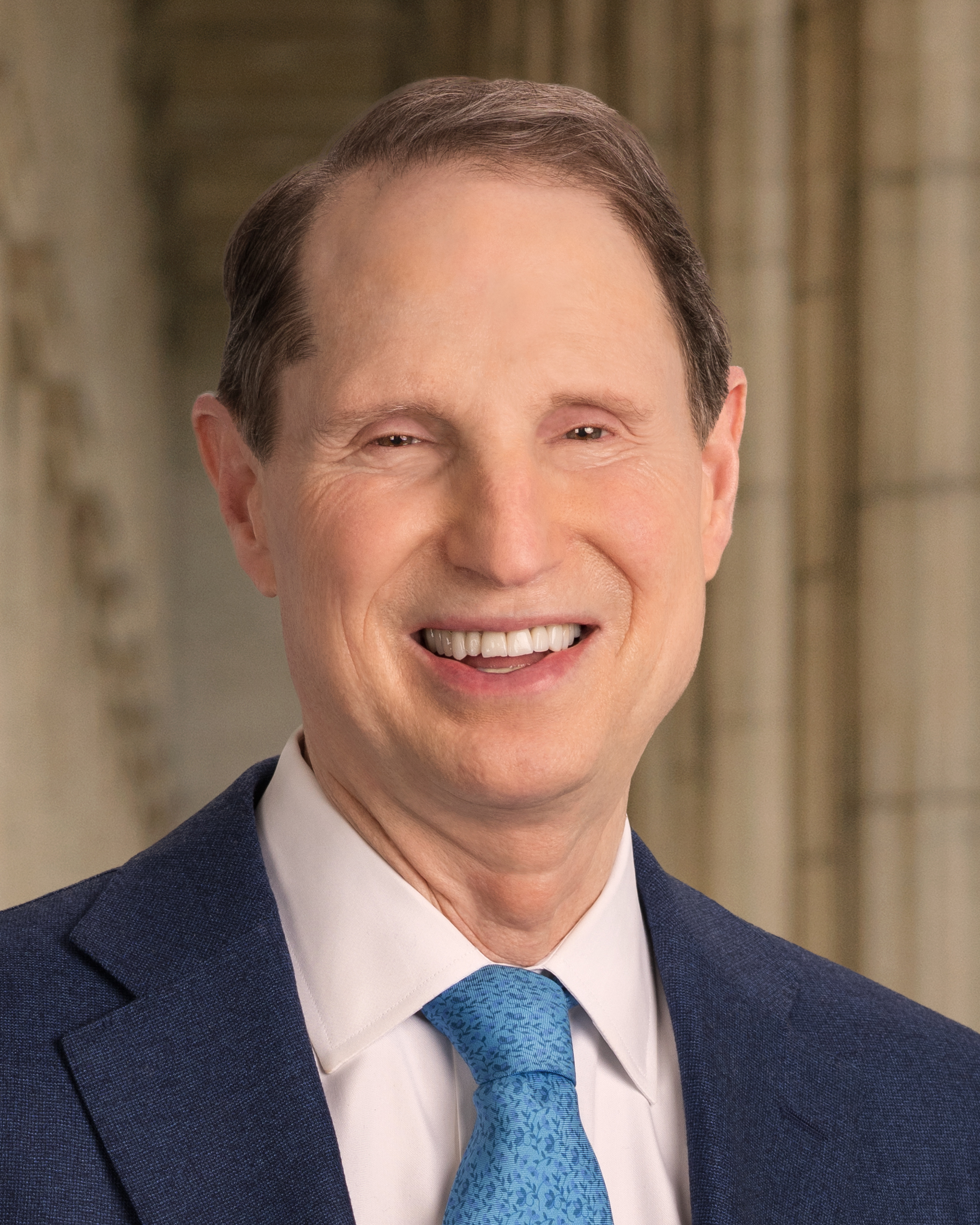
Ron Wyden (D)

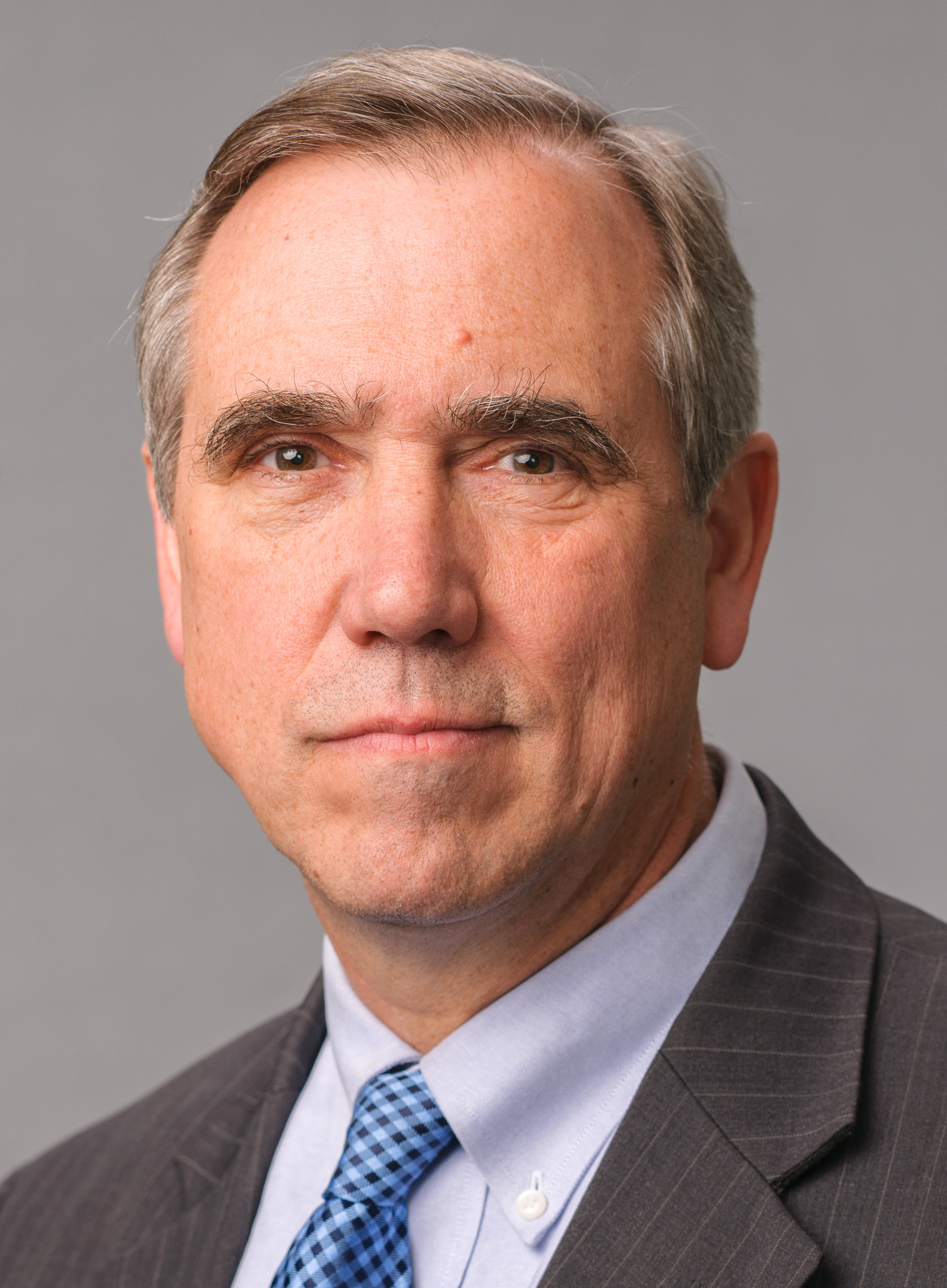
Jeff Merkley (D)

(ordered by seniority)

Oregon was admitted to the Union on February 14, 1859. Its current U.S. senators are Democrats Ron Wyden (serving since 1996) and Jeff Merkley (serving since 2009). Currently on his fifth full term, Wyden is Oregon's longest-serving senator.

Before 1906, U.S. senators were elected by the Oregon Legislative Assembly. In 1904, Oregon voters passed a ballot measure that required U.S. senators to be selected by a popular vote and then endorsed by the state legislature. Beginning in 1914, U.S. senators were directly elected by popular vote based on the 17th Amendment to the United States Constitution.

== List of senators ==
Class 2 Class 2 senators belong to the electoral cycle that most recently had regular elections in 2008, 2014, 2020, and 2026. The next election will be in 2032.						C	Class 3 Class 3 senators belong to the electoral cycle that most recently had regular elections in 2004, 2010, 2016, and 2022. The next election will be in 2028.					
#	Senator	Party	Dates in office	Electoral history	T	C	T	Electoral history	Dates in office	Party	Senator	#
1	Delazon Smith (Portland)	Democratic	Feb 14, 1859 – Mar 3, 1859	Elected in 1859. Lost re-election.	1	35th	1	Elected in 1859. Retired.	Feb 14, 1859 – Mar 3, 1861	Democratic	Joseph Lane (Winchester)	1
Vacant			Mar 3, 1859 – Oct 1, 1860	Legislature failed to elect.	2	36th	1	Elected in 1859. Retired.	Feb 14, 1859 – Mar 3, 1861	Democratic	Joseph Lane (Winchester)	1
2	Edward D. Baker (Oregon City)	Republican	Oct 1, 1860 – Oct 21, 1861	Elected late in 1860. Died.	2	36th	1	Elected in 1859. Retired.	Feb 14, 1859 – Mar 3, 1861	Democratic	Joseph Lane (Winchester)	1
2	Edward D. Baker (Oregon City)	Republican	Oct 1, 1860 – Oct 21, 1861	Elected late in 1860. Died.	2	37th	2	Election year unknown. Lost re-election.	Mar 4, 1861 – Mar 3, 1867	Democratic	James Nesmith (Salem)	2
Vacant			Oct 21, 1861 – Feb 27, 1862		2	37th	2	Election year unknown. Lost re-election.	Mar 4, 1861 – Mar 3, 1867	Democratic	James Nesmith (Salem)	2
3	Benjamin Stark (Portland)	Democratic	Feb 27, 1862 – Sep 12, 1862	Appointed to continue Baker's term. Retired when successor elected.	2	37th	2	Election year unknown. Lost re-election.	Mar 4, 1861 – Mar 3, 1867	Democratic	James Nesmith (Salem)	2
4	Benjamin F. Harding (Salem)	Union (Note: Harding, a War Democrat, helped to organize the Union Party in Oregon and was elected to the Senate by that party in 1862.)	Sep 12, 1862 – Mar 3, 1865	Elected to finish Baker's term. Retired.	2	37th	2	Election year unknown. Lost re-election.	Mar 4, 1861 – Mar 3, 1867	Democratic	James Nesmith (Salem)	2
4	Benjamin F. Harding (Salem)	Union	Sep 12, 1862 – Mar 3, 1865	Elected to finish Baker's term. Retired.	2	38th	2	Election year unknown. Lost re-election.	Mar 4, 1861 – Mar 3, 1867	Democratic	James Nesmith (Salem)	2
5	George H. Williams (Portland)	Republican	Mar 4, 1865 – Mar 3, 1871	Elected in 1864. Lost re-election.	3	39th	2	Election year unknown. Lost re-election.	Mar 4, 1861 – Mar 3, 1867	Democratic	James Nesmith (Salem)	2
5	George H. Williams (Portland)	Republican	Mar 4, 1865 – Mar 3, 1871	Elected in 1864. Lost re-election.	3	40th	3	Election year unknown. Retired.	Mar 4, 1867 – Mar 3, 1873	Republican	Henry W. Corbett (Portland)	3
5	George H. Williams (Portland)	Republican	Mar 4, 1865 – Mar 3, 1871	Elected in 1864. Lost re-election.	3	41st	3	Election year unknown. Retired.	Mar 4, 1867 – Mar 3, 1873	Republican	Henry W. Corbett (Portland)	3
6	James K. Kelly (Portland)	Democratic	Mar 4, 1871 – Mar 3, 1877	Elected in 1870. Retired.	4	42nd	3	Election year unknown. Retired.	Mar 4, 1867 – Mar 3, 1873	Republican	Henry W. Corbett (Portland)	3
6	James K. Kelly (Portland)	Democratic	Mar 4, 1871 – Mar 3, 1877	Elected in 1870. Retired.	4	43rd	4	Elected in 1872. Lost re-election.	Mar 4, 1873 – Mar 3, 1879	Republican	John H. Mitchell (Portland)	4
6	James K. Kelly (Portland)	Democratic	Mar 4, 1871 – Mar 3, 1877	Elected in 1870. Retired.	4	44th	4	Elected in 1872. Lost re-election.	Mar 4, 1873 – Mar 3, 1879	Republican	John H. Mitchell (Portland)	4
7	La Fayette Grover (Salem)	Democratic	Mar 4, 1877 – Mar 3, 1883	Election year unknown. Retired.	5	45th	4	Elected in 1872. Lost re-election.	Mar 4, 1873 – Mar 3, 1879	Republican	John H. Mitchell (Portland)	4
7	La Fayette Grover (Salem)	Democratic	Mar 4, 1877 – Mar 3, 1883	Election year unknown. Retired.	5	46th	5	Election year unknown. Retired.	Mar 4, 1879 – Mar 3, 1885	Democratic	James H. Slater (La Grande)	5
7	La Fayette Grover (Salem)	Democratic	Mar 4, 1877 – Mar 3, 1883	Election year unknown. Retired.	5	47th	5	Election year unknown. Retired.	Mar 4, 1879 – Mar 3, 1885	Democratic	James H. Slater (La Grande)	5
8	Joseph N. Dolph (Portland)	Republican	Mar 4, 1883 – Mar 3, 1895	Elected in 1882.	6	48th	5	Election year unknown. Retired.	Mar 4, 1879 – Mar 3, 1885	Democratic	James H. Slater (La Grande)	5
8	Joseph N. Dolph (Portland)	Republican	Mar 4, 1883 – Mar 3, 1895	Elected in 1882.	6	49th	6		Mar 3, 1885 – Nov 18, 1885	Vacant		
8	Joseph N. Dolph (Portland)	Republican	Mar 4, 1883 – Mar 3, 1895	Elected in 1882.	6	49th	6	Elected late in 1885.	Nov 18, 1885 – Mar 3, 1897	Republican	John H. Mitchell (Portland)	6
8	Joseph N. Dolph (Portland)	Republican	Mar 4, 1883 – Mar 3, 1895	Elected in 1882.	6	50th	6	Elected late in 1885.	Nov 18, 1885 – Mar 3, 1897	Republican	John H. Mitchell (Portland)	6
8	Joseph N. Dolph (Portland)	Republican	Mar 4, 1883 – Mar 3, 1895	Re-elected in 1888. Lost re-election.	7	51st	6	Elected late in 1885.	Nov 18, 1885 – Mar 3, 1897	Republican	John H. Mitchell (Portland)	6
8	Joseph N. Dolph (Portland)	Republican	Mar 4, 1883 – Mar 3, 1895	Re-elected in 1888. Lost re-election.	7	52nd	7	Re-elected in 1890. Lost re-election.	Nov 18, 1885 – Mar 3, 1897	Republican	John H. Mitchell (Portland)	6
8	Joseph N. Dolph (Portland)	Republican	Mar 4, 1883 – Mar 3, 1895	Re-elected in 1888. Lost re-election.	7	53rd	7	Re-elected in 1890. Lost re-election.	Nov 18, 1885 – Mar 3, 1897	Republican	John H. Mitchell (Portland)	6
9	George W. McBride (St. Helens)	Republican	Mar 4, 1895 – Mar 3, 1901	Elected in 1895. Lost renomination.	8	54th	7	Re-elected in 1890. Lost re-election.	Nov 18, 1885 – Mar 3, 1897	Republican	John H. Mitchell (Portland)	6
9	George W. McBride (St. Helens)	Republican	Mar 4, 1895 – Mar 3, 1901	Elected in 1895. Lost renomination.	8	55th	8		Mar 3, 1897 – Oct 7, 1898	Vacant		
9	George W. McBride (St. Helens)	Republican	Mar 4, 1895 – Mar 3, 1901	Elected in 1895. Lost renomination.	8	55th	8	Elected late in 1898. Retired.	Oct 7, 1898 – Mar 3, 1903	Republican	Joseph Simon (Portland)	7
9	George W. McBride (St. Helens)	Republican	Mar 4, 1895 – Mar 3, 1901	Elected in 1895. Lost renomination.	8	56th	8	Elected late in 1898. Retired.	Oct 7, 1898 – Mar 3, 1903	Republican	Joseph Simon (Portland)	7
10	John H. Mitchell (Portland)	Republican	Mar 4, 1901 – Dec 8, 1905	Elected in 1901. Died.	9	57th	8	Elected late in 1898. Retired.	Oct 7, 1898 – Mar 3, 1903	Republican	Joseph Simon (Portland)	7
10	John H. Mitchell (Portland)	Republican	Mar 4, 1901 – Dec 8, 1905	Elected in 1901. Died.	9	58th	9	Elected in 1903. Lost re-election.	Mar 4, 1903 – Mar 3, 1909	Republican	Charles W. Fulton (Astoria)	8
10	John H. Mitchell (Portland)	Republican	Mar 4, 1901 – Dec 8, 1905	Elected in 1901. Died.	9	59th	9	Elected in 1903. Lost re-election.	Mar 4, 1903 – Mar 3, 1909	Republican	Charles W. Fulton (Astoria)	8
Vacant			Dec 8, 1905 – Dec 21, 1905		9	59th	9	Elected in 1903. Lost re-election.	Mar 4, 1903 – Mar 3, 1909	Republican	Charles W. Fulton (Astoria)	8
11	John M. Gearin (Portland)	Democratic	Dec 21, 1905 – Jan 23, 1907	Appointed to continue Mitchell's term. Retired when successor elected.	9	59th	9	Elected in 1903. Lost re-election.	Mar 4, 1903 – Mar 3, 1909	Republican	Charles W. Fulton (Astoria)	8
12	Frederick W. Mulkey (Portland)	Republican	Jan 23, 1907 – Mar 3, 1907	Elected to finish Mitchell's term. Retired.	9	59th	9	Elected in 1903. Lost re-election.	Mar 4, 1903 – Mar 3, 1909	Republican	Charles W. Fulton (Astoria)	8
13	Jonathan Bourne Jr. (Portland)	Republican	Mar 4, 1907 – Mar 3, 1913	Elected in 1907. Lost renomination.	10	60th	9	Elected in 1903. Lost re-election.	Mar 4, 1903 – Mar 3, 1909	Republican	Charles W. Fulton (Astoria)	8
13	Jonathan Bourne Jr. (Portland)	Republican	Mar 4, 1907 – Mar 3, 1913	Elected in 1907. Lost renomination.	10	61st	10	Elected in 1909.	Mar 4, 1909 – Mar 3, 1921	Democratic	George E. Chamberlain (Portland)	9
13	Jonathan Bourne Jr. (Portland)	Republican	Mar 4, 1907 – Mar 3, 1913	Elected in 1907. Lost renomination.	10	62nd	10	Elected in 1909.	Mar 4, 1909 – Mar 3, 1921	Democratic	George E. Chamberlain (Portland)	9
14	Harry Lane (Portland)	Democratic	Mar 4, 1913 – May 23, 1917	Elected in 1913. Died.	11	63rd	10	Elected in 1909.	Mar 4, 1909 – Mar 3, 1921	Democratic	George E. Chamberlain (Portland)	9
14	Harry Lane (Portland)	Democratic	Mar 4, 1913 – May 23, 1917	Elected in 1913. Died.	11	64th	11	Re-elected in 1914. Lost re-election.	Mar 4, 1909 – Mar 3, 1921	Democratic	George E. Chamberlain (Portland)	9
14	Harry Lane (Portland)	Democratic	Mar 4, 1913 – May 23, 1917	Elected in 1913. Died.	11	65th	11	Re-elected in 1914. Lost re-election.	Mar 4, 1909 – Mar 3, 1921	Democratic	George E. Chamberlain (Portland)	9
Vacant			May 23, 1917 – May 29, 1917		11	65th	11	Re-elected in 1914. Lost re-election.	Mar 4, 1909 – Mar 3, 1921	Democratic	George E. Chamberlain (Portland)	9
15	Charles L. McNary (Salem)	Republican	May 29, 1917 – Nov 5, 1918	Appointed to continue Lane's term. Not elected to finish Lane's term.	11	65th	11	Re-elected in 1914. Lost re-election.	Mar 4, 1909 – Mar 3, 1921	Democratic	George E. Chamberlain (Portland)	9
16	Frederick W. Mulkey (Portland)	Republican	Nov 6, 1918 – Dec 17, 1918	Elected to finish Lane's term. Resigned early to give successor preferential seniority.	11	65th	11	Re-elected in 1914. Lost re-election.	Mar 4, 1909 – Mar 3, 1921	Democratic	George E. Chamberlain (Portland)	9
17	Charles L. McNary (Salem)	Republican	Dec 18, 1918 – Feb 25, 1944	Appointed to finish Lane's term, having already been elected to the next term.	11	65th	11	Re-elected in 1914. Lost re-election.	Mar 4, 1909 – Mar 3, 1921	Democratic	George E. Chamberlain (Portland)	9
17	Charles L. McNary (Salem)	Republican	Dec 18, 1918 – Feb 25, 1944	Elected in 1918.	12	66th	11	Re-elected in 1914. Lost re-election.	Mar 4, 1909 – Mar 3, 1921	Democratic	George E. Chamberlain (Portland)	9
17	Charles L. McNary (Salem)	Republican	Dec 18, 1918 – Feb 25, 1944	Elected in 1918.	12	67th	12	Elected in 1920. Lost re-nomination.	Mar 4, 1921 – Mar 3, 1927	Republican	Robert N. Stanfield (Portland)	10
17	Charles L. McNary (Salem)	Republican	Dec 18, 1918 – Feb 25, 1944	Elected in 1918.	12	68th	12	Elected in 1920. Lost re-nomination.	Mar 4, 1921 – Mar 3, 1927	Republican	Robert N. Stanfield (Portland)	10
17	Charles L. McNary (Salem)	Republican	Dec 18, 1918 – Feb 25, 1944	Re-elected in 1924.	13	69th	12	Elected in 1920. Lost re-nomination.	Mar 4, 1921 – Mar 3, 1927	Republican	Robert N. Stanfield (Portland)	10
17	Charles L. McNary (Salem)	Republican	Dec 18, 1918 – Feb 25, 1944	Re-elected in 1924.	13	70th	13	Elected in 1926.	Mar 4, 1927 – Jan 31, 1938	Republican	Frederick Steiwer (Portland)	11
17	Charles L. McNary (Salem)	Republican	Dec 18, 1918 – Feb 25, 1944	Re-elected in 1924.	13	71st	13	Elected in 1926.	Mar 4, 1927 – Jan 31, 1938	Republican	Frederick Steiwer (Portland)	11
17	Charles L. McNary (Salem)	Republican	Dec 18, 1918 – Feb 25, 1944	Re-elected in 1930.	14	72nd	13	Elected in 1926.	Mar 4, 1927 – Jan 31, 1938	Republican	Frederick Steiwer (Portland)	11
17	Charles L. McNary (Salem)	Republican	Dec 18, 1918 – Feb 25, 1944	Re-elected in 1930.	14	73rd	14	Re-elected in 1932. Resigned.	Mar 4, 1927 – Jan 31, 1938	Republican	Frederick Steiwer (Portland)	11
17	Charles L. McNary (Salem)	Republican	Dec 18, 1918 – Feb 25, 1944	Re-elected in 1930.	14	74th	14	Re-elected in 1932. Resigned.	Mar 4, 1927 – Jan 31, 1938	Republican	Frederick Steiwer (Portland)	11
17	Charles L. McNary (Salem)	Republican	Dec 18, 1918 – Feb 25, 1944	Re-elected in 1936.	15	75th	14	Re-elected in 1932. Resigned.	Mar 4, 1927 – Jan 31, 1938	Republican	Frederick Steiwer (Portland)	11
17	Charles L. McNary (Salem)	Republican	Dec 18, 1918 – Feb 25, 1944	Re-elected in 1936.	15	75th	14		Jan 31, 1938 – Feb 1, 1938	Vacant		
17	Charles L. McNary (Salem)	Republican	Dec 18, 1918 – Feb 25, 1944	Re-elected in 1936.	15	75th	14	Appointed to continue Steiwer's term. Retired when successor elected.	Feb 1, 1938 – Nov 8, 1938	Democratic	Alfred Reames (Medford)	12
17	Charles L. McNary (Salem)	Republican	Dec 18, 1918 – Feb 25, 1944	Re-elected in 1936.	15	75th	14	Elected to finish Steiwer's term. Retired.	Nov 9, 1938 – Jan 3, 1939	Republican	Alexander Barry (Portland)	13
17	Charles L. McNary (Salem)	Republican	Dec 18, 1918 – Feb 25, 1944	Re-elected in 1936.	15	76th	15	Elected in 1938. Lost renomination.	Jan 3, 1939 – Jan 3, 1945	Republican	Rufus C. Holman (Portland)	14
17	Charles L. McNary (Salem)	Republican	Dec 18, 1918 – Feb 25, 1944	Re-elected in 1936.	15	77th	15	Elected in 1938. Lost renomination.	Jan 3, 1939 – Jan 3, 1945	Republican	Rufus C. Holman (Portland)	14
17	Charles L. McNary (Salem)	Republican	Dec 18, 1918 – Feb 25, 1944	Re-elected in 1942. Died.	16	78th	15	Elected in 1938. Lost renomination.	Jan 3, 1939 – Jan 3, 1945	Republican	Rufus C. Holman (Portland)	14
Vacant			Feb 25, 1944 – Mar 13, 1944		16	78th	15	Elected in 1938. Lost renomination.	Jan 3, 1939 – Jan 3, 1945	Republican	Rufus C. Holman (Portland)	14
18	Guy Cordon (Roseburg)	Republican	Mar 13, 1944 – Jan 3, 1955	Appointed to continue McNary's term. Elected in 1944 to finish McNary's term.	16	78th	15	Elected in 1938. Lost renomination.	Jan 3, 1939 – Jan 3, 1945	Republican	Rufus C. Holman (Portland)	14
18	Guy Cordon (Roseburg)	Republican	Mar 13, 1944 – Jan 3, 1955	Appointed to continue McNary's term. Elected in 1944 to finish McNary's term.	16	79th	16	Elected in 1944.	Jan 3, 1945 – Jan 3, 1969	Republican	Wayne Morse (Eugene)	15
18	Guy Cordon (Roseburg)	Republican	Mar 13, 1944 – Jan 3, 1955	Appointed to continue McNary's term. Elected in 1944 to finish McNary's term.	16	80th	16	Elected in 1944.	Jan 3, 1945 – Jan 3, 1969	Republican	Wayne Morse (Eugene)	15
18	Guy Cordon (Roseburg)	Republican	Mar 13, 1944 – Jan 3, 1955	Re-elected in 1948. Lost re-election.	17	81st	16	Elected in 1944.	Jan 3, 1945 – Jan 3, 1969	Republican	Wayne Morse (Eugene)	15
18	Guy Cordon (Roseburg)	Republican	Mar 13, 1944 – Jan 3, 1955	Re-elected in 1948. Lost re-election.	17	82nd	17	Re-elected in 1950.	Jan 3, 1945 – Jan 3, 1969	Republican	Wayne Morse (Eugene)	15
18	Guy Cordon (Roseburg)	Republican	Mar 13, 1944 – Jan 3, 1955	Re-elected in 1948. Lost re-election.	17	82nd	17	Re-elected in 1950.	Jan 3, 1945 – Jan 3, 1969	Independent	Wayne Morse (Eugene)	15
18	Guy Cordon (Roseburg)	Republican	Mar 13, 1944 – Jan 3, 1955	Re-elected in 1948. Lost re-election.	17	83rd	17	Re-elected in 1950.	Jan 3, 1945 – Jan 3, 1969	Independent	Wayne Morse (Eugene)	15
19	Richard L. Neuberger (Portland)	Democratic	Jan 3, 1955 – Mar 9, 1960	Elected in 1954. Died.	18	84th	17	Re-elected in 1950.	Jan 3, 1945 – Jan 3, 1969	Democratic	Wayne Morse (Eugene)	15
19	Richard L. Neuberger (Portland)	Democratic	Jan 3, 1955 – Mar 9, 1960	Elected in 1954. Died.	18	85th	18	Re-elected in 1956.	Jan 3, 1945 – Jan 3, 1969	Democratic	Wayne Morse (Eugene)	15
19	Richard L. Neuberger (Portland)	Democratic	Jan 3, 1955 – Mar 9, 1960	Elected in 1954. Died.	18	86th	18	Re-elected in 1956.	Jan 3, 1945 – Jan 3, 1969	Democratic	Wayne Morse (Eugene)	15
Vacant			Mar 9, 1960 – Mar 23, 1960		18	86th	18	Re-elected in 1956.	Jan 3, 1945 – Jan 3, 1969	Democratic	Wayne Morse (Eugene)	15
20	Hall S. Lusk (Portland)	Democratic	Mar 23, 1960 – Nov 9, 1960	Appointed to continue Neuberger's term. Retired when successor elected.	18	86th	18	Re-elected in 1956.	Jan 3, 1945 – Jan 3, 1969	Democratic	Wayne Morse (Eugene)	15
21	Maurine Neuberger (Portland)	Democratic	Nov 9, 1960 – Jan 3, 1967	Elected to finish her husband's term.	18	86th	18	Re-elected in 1956.	Jan 3, 1945 – Jan 3, 1969	Democratic	Wayne Morse (Eugene)	15
21	Maurine Neuberger (Portland)	Democratic	Nov 9, 1960 – Jan 3, 1967	Elected to full term in 1960. Retired.	19	87th	18	Re-elected in 1956.	Jan 3, 1945 – Jan 3, 1969	Democratic	Wayne Morse (Eugene)	15
21	Maurine Neuberger (Portland)	Democratic	Nov 9, 1960 – Jan 3, 1967	Elected to full term in 1960. Retired.	19	88th	19	Re-elected in 1962. Lost re-election.	Jan 3, 1945 – Jan 3, 1969	Democratic	Wayne Morse (Eugene)	15
21	Maurine Neuberger (Portland)	Democratic	Nov 9, 1960 – Jan 3, 1967	Elected to full term in 1960. Retired.	19	89th	19	Re-elected in 1962. Lost re-election.	Jan 3, 1945 – Jan 3, 1969	Democratic	Wayne Morse (Eugene)	15
Vacant			Jan 3, 1967 – Jan 10, 1967		20	90th	19	Re-elected in 1962. Lost re-election.	Jan 3, 1945 – Jan 3, 1969	Democratic	Wayne Morse (Eugene)	15
22	Mark Hatfield (Salem)	Republican	Jan 10, 1967 – Jan 3, 1997	Elected in 1966. Seated late in order to finish his term as Governor of Oregon.	20	90th	19	Re-elected in 1962. Lost re-election.	Jan 3, 1945 – Jan 3, 1969	Democratic	Wayne Morse (Eugene)	15
22	Mark Hatfield (Salem)	Republican	Jan 10, 1967 – Jan 3, 1997	Elected in 1966. Seated late in order to finish his term as Governor of Oregon.	20	91st	20	Elected in 1968.	Jan 3, 1969 – Oct 1, 1995	Republican	Bob Packwood (Portland)	16
22	Mark Hatfield (Salem)	Republican	Jan 10, 1967 – Jan 3, 1997	Elected in 1966. Seated late in order to finish his term as Governor of Oregon.	20	92nd	20	Elected in 1968.	Jan 3, 1969 – Oct 1, 1995	Republican	Bob Packwood (Portland)	16
22	Mark Hatfield (Salem)	Republican	Jan 10, 1967 – Jan 3, 1997	Re-elected in 1972.	21	93rd	20	Elected in 1968.	Jan 3, 1969 – Oct 1, 1995	Republican	Bob Packwood (Portland)	16
22	Mark Hatfield (Salem)	Republican	Jan 10, 1967 – Jan 3, 1997	Re-elected in 1972.	21	94th	21	Re-elected in 1974.	Jan 3, 1969 – Oct 1, 1995	Republican	Bob Packwood (Portland)	16
22	Mark Hatfield (Salem)	Republican	Jan 10, 1967 – Jan 3, 1997	Re-elected in 1972.	21	95th	21	Re-elected in 1974.	Jan 3, 1969 – Oct 1, 1995	Republican	Bob Packwood (Portland)	16
22	Mark Hatfield (Salem)	Republican	Jan 10, 1967 – Jan 3, 1997	Re-elected in 1978.	22	96th	21	Re-elected in 1974.	Jan 3, 1969 – Oct 1, 1995	Republican	Bob Packwood (Portland)	16
22	Mark Hatfield (Salem)	Republican	Jan 10, 1967 – Jan 3, 1997	Re-elected in 1978.	22	97th	22	Re-elected in 1980.	Jan 3, 1969 – Oct 1, 1995	Republican	Bob Packwood (Portland)	16
22	Mark Hatfield (Salem)	Republican	Jan 10, 1967 – Jan 3, 1997	Re-elected in 1978.	22	98th	22	Re-elected in 1980.	Jan 3, 1969 – Oct 1, 1995	Republican	Bob Packwood (Portland)	16
22	Mark Hatfield (Salem)	Republican	Jan 10, 1967 – Jan 3, 1997	Re-elected in 1984.	23	99th	22	Re-elected in 1980.	Jan 3, 1969 – Oct 1, 1995	Republican	Bob Packwood (Portland)	16
22	Mark Hatfield (Salem)	Republican	Jan 10, 1967 – Jan 3, 1997	Re-elected in 1984.	23	100th	23	Re-elected in 1986.	Jan 3, 1969 – Oct 1, 1995	Republican	Bob Packwood (Portland)	16
22	Mark Hatfield (Salem)	Republican	Jan 10, 1967 – Jan 3, 1997	Re-elected in 1984.	23	101st	23	Re-elected in 1986.	Jan 3, 1969 – Oct 1, 1995	Republican	Bob Packwood (Portland)	16
22	Mark Hatfield (Salem)	Republican	Jan 10, 1967 – Jan 3, 1997	Re-elected in 1990. Retired.	24	102nd	23	Re-elected in 1986.	Jan 3, 1969 – Oct 1, 1995	Republican	Bob Packwood (Portland)	16
22	Mark Hatfield (Salem)	Republican	Jan 10, 1967 – Jan 3, 1997	Re-elected in 1990. Retired.	24	103rd	24	Re-elected in 1992. Resigned.	Jan 3, 1969 – Oct 1, 1995	Republican	Bob Packwood (Portland)	16
22	Mark Hatfield (Salem)	Republican	Jan 10, 1967 – Jan 3, 1997	Re-elected in 1990. Retired.	24	104th	24	Re-elected in 1992. Resigned.	Jan 3, 1969 – Oct 1, 1995	Republican	Bob Packwood (Portland)	16
22	Mark Hatfield (Salem)	Republican	Jan 10, 1967 – Jan 3, 1997	Re-elected in 1990. Retired.	24	104th	24		Oct 1, 1995 – Feb 6, 1996	Vacant		
22	Mark Hatfield (Salem)	Republican	Jan 10, 1967 – Jan 3, 1997	Re-elected in 1990. Retired.	24	104th	24	Elected in 1996 to finish Packwood's term.	Feb 6, 1996 – present	Democratic	Ron Wyden (Portland)	17
23	Gordon Smith (Pendleton)	Republican	Jan 3, 1997 – Jan 3, 2009	Elected in 1996.	25	105th	24	Elected in 1996 to finish Packwood's term.	Feb 6, 1996 – present	Democratic	Ron Wyden (Portland)	17
23	Gordon Smith (Pendleton)	Republican	Jan 3, 1997 – Jan 3, 2009	Elected in 1996.	25	106th	25	Re-elected in 1998.	Feb 6, 1996 – present	Democratic	Ron Wyden (Portland)	17
23	Gordon Smith (Pendleton)	Republican	Jan 3, 1997 – Jan 3, 2009	Elected in 1996.	25	107th	25	Re-elected in 1998.	Feb 6, 1996 – present	Democratic	Ron Wyden (Portland)	17
23	Gordon Smith (Pendleton)	Republican	Jan 3, 1997 – Jan 3, 2009	Re-elected in 2002. Lost re-election.	26	108th	25	Re-elected in 1998.	Feb 6, 1996 – present	Democratic	Ron Wyden (Portland)	17
23	Gordon Smith (Pendleton)	Republican	Jan 3, 1997 – Jan 3, 2009	Re-elected in 2002. Lost re-election.	26	109th	26	Re-elected in 2004.	Feb 6, 1996 – present	Democratic	Ron Wyden (Portland)	17
23	Gordon Smith (Pendleton)	Republican	Jan 3, 1997 – Jan 3, 2009	Re-elected in 2002. Lost re-election.	26	110th	26	Re-elected in 2004.	Feb 6, 1996 – present	Democratic	Ron Wyden (Portland)	17
24	Jeff Merkley (Portland)	Democratic	Jan 3, 2009 – present	Elected in 2008.	27	111th	26	Re-elected in 2004.	Feb 6, 1996 – present	Democratic	Ron Wyden (Portland)	17
24	Jeff Merkley (Portland)	Democratic	Jan 3, 2009 – present	Elected in 2008.	27	112th	27	Re-elected in 2010.	Feb 6, 1996 – present	Democratic	Ron Wyden (Portland)	17
24	Jeff Merkley (Portland)	Democratic	Jan 3, 2009 – present	Elected in 2008.	27	113th	27	Re-elected in 2010.	Feb 6, 1996 – present	Democratic	Ron Wyden (Portland)	17
24	Jeff Merkley (Portland)	Democratic	Jan 3, 2009 – present	Re-elected in 2014.	28	114th	27	Re-elected in 2010.	Feb 6, 1996 – present	Democratic	Ron Wyden (Portland)	17
24	Jeff Merkley (Portland)	Democratic	Jan 3, 2009 – present	Re-elected in 2014.	28	115th	28	Re-elected in 2016.	Feb 6, 1996 – present	Democratic	Ron Wyden (Portland)	17
24	Jeff Merkley (Portland)	Democratic	Jan 3, 2009 – present	Re-elected in 2014.	28	116th	28	Re-elected in 2016.	Feb 6, 1996 – present	Democratic	Ron Wyden (Portland)	17
24	Jeff Merkley (Portland)	Democratic	Jan 3, 2009 – present	Re-elected in 2020.	29	117th	28	Re-elected in 2016.	Feb 6, 1996 – present	Democratic	Ron Wyden (Portland)	17
24	Jeff Merkley (Portland)	Democratic	Jan 3, 2009 – present	Re-elected in 2020.	29	118th	29	Re-elected in 2022.	Feb 6, 1996 – present	Democratic	Ron Wyden (Portland)	17
24	Jeff Merkley (Portland)	Democratic	Jan 3, 2009 – present	Re-elected in 2020.	29	119th	29	Re-elected in 2022.	Feb 6, 1996 – present	Democratic	Ron Wyden (Portland)	17
24	Jeff Merkley (Portland)	Democratic	Jan 3, 2009 – present	Re-elected in 2026.	30	120th	29	Re-elected in 2022.	Feb 6, 1996 – present	Democratic	Ron Wyden (Portland)	17
24	Jeff Merkley (Portland)	Democratic	Jan 3, 2009 – present	Re-elected in 2026.	30	121st	30	To be determined in the 2028 election.				
24	Jeff Merkley (Portland)	Democratic	Jan 3, 2009 – present	Re-elected in 2026.	30	122nd	30	To be determined in the 2028 election.				
To be determined in the 2032 election.					31	123rd	30	To be determined in the 2028 election.				

== See also ==
- Elections in Oregon
- List of United States representatives from Oregon
- Oregon's congressional delegations
