= Rufus C. Holman =

American politician

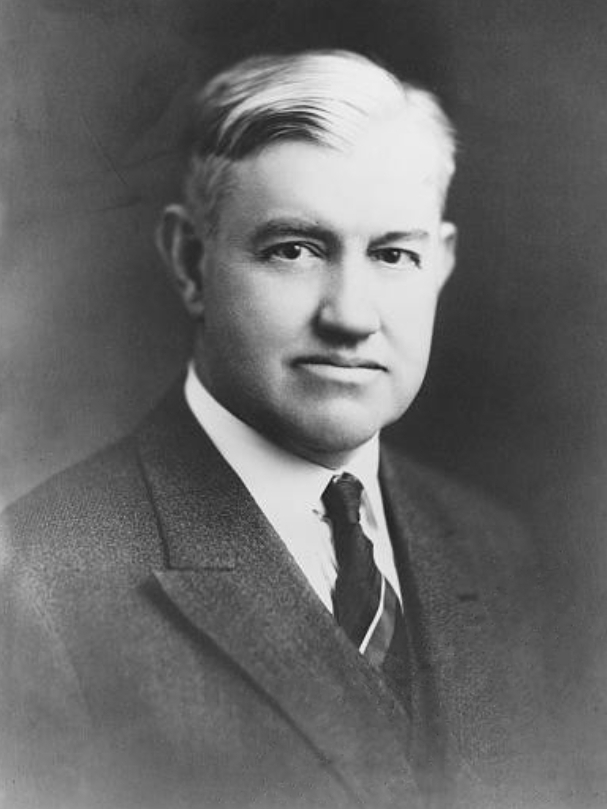
- Holman in 1943

United States Senator from Oregon
- In office January 3, 1939 – January 3, 1945
- Preceded by: Alexander G. Barry
- Succeeded by: Wayne Morse

14th Treasurer of Oregon
- In office May 1, 1931 – December 27, 1938
- Governor: Julius L. Meier; Charles H. Martin; Charles A. Sprague
- Preceded by: Thomas B. Kay
- Succeeded by: Walter E. Pearson

Personal details
- Born: Rufus Cecil Holman; October 14, 1877 Portland, Oregon, U.S.
- Died: November 27, 1959 (aged 82) Portland, Oregon, U.S.
- Party: Republican

Rufus Cecil Holman (October 14, 1877 – November 27, 1959) was an American politician and businessman who served as a United States senator for a single term during World War II. He was an officer in the Ku Klux Klan during the 1920s, then served as Oregon State Treasurer. He was a member of the Multnomah County Board of Commissioners.

Running for re-election in May 1944, Holman was defeated in the Republican primary by Wayne Morse.

== Early life ==
Holman was born in Portland, Oregon, on October 14, 1877. He was educated in public schools and became a teacher in 1896.

== Career ==
After leaving teaching in 1898, he worked in various fields from farming and operating a steamboat, to pursuits related to the accounting field until 1910. That year, Holman began making record keeping books and paper boxes in Portland. He then worked in the cold storage business and was active in civic affairs.

=== Politics ===
Holman won his first election to political office in 1914, when he was elected to the Multnomah County Board of Commissioners, where he served two four-year terms (1914–1922)

During the mid-1920s, Holman was an active member of the Ku Klux Klan in Oregon, serving as an officer.

In 1931, Oregon Governor Julius L. Meier appointed him as state treasurer after Thomas B. Kay died in office. He began in office on May 1, 1931, winning election to a full four-year term in 1932, and winning re-election in 1936. He resigned from the office in 1938, leaving on December 27, 1938.

Holman was strongly concerned about the environment. In 1937, he garnered publicity when he demonstrated the polluted state of the Willamette River by briefly holding a cage of salmon in the water, then quickly pulling them out dying to a shocked audience.

In 1938, he was elected to the United States Senate. As Senator, Holman was critical of the foreign policy of President Franklin D. Roosevelt, taking a strongly isolationist position which placed him on the right wing of Oregon politics. As a Senator Holman was a staunch opponent of liberalizing immigration laws to allow easier immigration by Jews and other persecuted Europeans, a position which was deeply resented by Oregon's small but politically potent Jewish population, who quickly came to view the former KKK member Holman as antisemitic and who sought his electoral defeat.

I have always deplored Hitler’s ambitions as a conqueror. But he broke the control of these internationalists over the common people of Germany. It would be a good idea if the control of the international bankers over the common people of England was broken, and good if it was broken over the wages and savings of the common people of the United States.

— Holman, speech on Senate floor, March 1941

While attenuating his isolationism after the December 1941 attack on Pearl Harbor, coming to support the war effort, Holman's name remained indissolubly tied with the now politically unpopular isolationist position and he faced a high-profile challenge in the May 1944 Republican primary from progressive Wayne Morse. Holman was an outspoken supporter of the internment of Japanese Americans and lobbied against their return.

During his 1944 re-election bid, Holman publicly charged that Morse was a stalking horse for the Democrats, who, facing a severe deficit in party registrations in Oregon, needed a fissure in the Republican camp to capture the Senate seat in November. When this conspiratorial theory did not gain traction, Holman proffered a new theory detailing an alleged plot involving the Portland shipyards of Henry J. Kaiser were being systematically used to stack the Republican primary against him. Newspaper editors around Oregon made hay over the conspiratorially-minded Senator, with one declaring that "like the ants, he has misplaced the center of the universe."

While the incumbent Holman won a majority of Oregon's counties, taking 20 to Morse's 16, it was Morse who dominated in populous Multnomah and Lane counties, winning the primary by a plurality of 10,000 votes out of more than 143,000 votes cast in a three-cornered race.

After his 1944 defeat, Holman returned to private life and never sought public office again. Holman returned to managing the Portland Paper Box Company in Portland, before retiring to his farm near Molalla, Oregon.

== Personal life ==
Holman died on November 27, 1959, in his home town of Portland. He was buried at River View Cemetery in Portland.

Holman's great-nephew, Ralph M. Holman, was a justice of the Oregon Supreme Court.

== Electoral history ==
Republican Primary – May 15, 1938
Candidate name	Votes	
Rufus C. Holman	90,215	62.4%
W.E. Burke	54,246	37.6%
Write-in	103	0.0%

General - May 15, 1938
Candidate name	Votes	
Rufus C. Holman (R)	206,233	54.7%
U.S. Burt (D)	161,073	42.7%
Don Swetland (I)	9,964	2.6%

Republican Primary – May 19, 1944
Candidate name	Votes	
Wayne Morse	70,716	49.3%
Rufus C. Holman	60,436	42.1%
Earl E. Fisher	12,241	8.5%

== Footnotes ==
Party political offices
Preceded by Alexander G. Barry	Republican nominee for U.S. Senator from Oregon (Class 3); 1938	Succeeded by Wayne Morse
U.S. Senate
Preceded by Alexander G. Barry	U.S. senator (Class 2) from Oregon; 1939–1945; Served alongside: Charles L. McNary, Guy Cordon	Succeeded by Wayne Morse
