= 1978 United States Senate election in Oregon =

- November 7, 1978
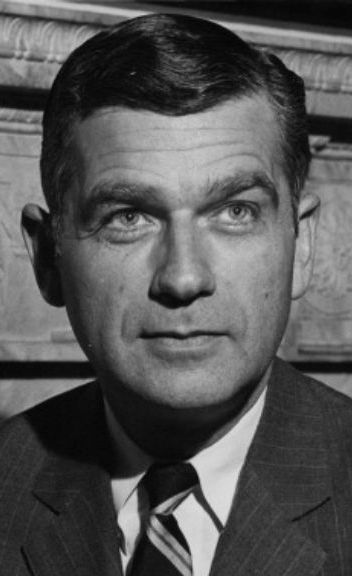

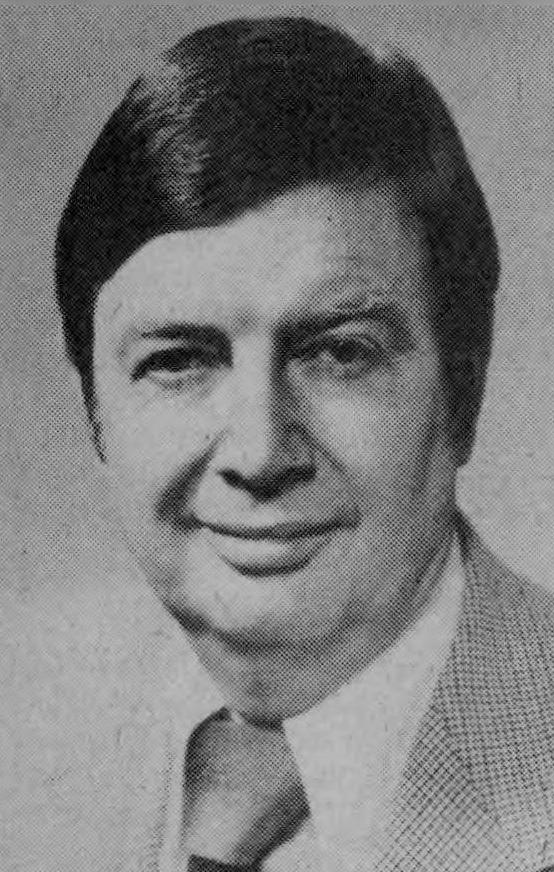
Nominee	Mark Hatfield	Vernon Cook
Party	Republican	Democratic
Popular vote	550,615	341,616
Percentage	61.66%	38.26%
- County results Hatfield: 50–60% 60–70% 70–80% Cook: 50–60%
U.S. senator before election
Mark Hatfield
Republican
Elected U.S. Senator
Mark Hatfield
Republican

The 1978 United States Senate election in Oregon took place on November 7, 1978. Incumbent Republican Senator Mark Hatfield was re-elected to a third term in office, defeating Democrat Vernon Cook.

== Republican primary ==
=== Candidates ===
- Mark Hatfield, incumbent Senator
- Bert W. Hawkins
- Robert D. Maxwell
- Richard L. Schnepel

=== Results ===
1978 Republican Senate primary
Party	Candidate	Votes	%
Republican	Mark Hatfield (incumbent)	159,617	65.66%
Republican	Bert W. Hawkins	43,350	17.83%
Republican	Robert D. Maxwell	24,294	9.99%
Republican	Richard L. Schnepel	15,628	6.43%
Write-in	All others	197	0.07%
Total votes		243,086	100.00%

== Democratic primary ==
=== Candidates ===
- Steve Anderson, attorney from Salem and candidate for U.S. Representative in 1960 and 1974
- Jack A. Brown
- Vernon Cook, state legislator from Gresham and candidate for U.S. Representative in 1970 and 1974
- John Sweeney, candidate for Mayor of Portland in 1968

=== Results ===
1978 Democratic Senate primary
Party	Candidate	Votes	%
Democratic	Vernon Cook	151,754	58.32%
Democratic	John Sweeney	41,599	15.99%
Democratic	Jack A. Brown	35,211	13.53%
Democratic	Steve Anderson	30,066	11.56%
Republican	Mark Hatfield (incumbent, write-in)	1,106	0.39%
Write-in	All others	552	0.21%
Total votes		260,197	100.00%

== General election ==
=== Results ===
General election results
Party	Candidate	Votes	%	±%
Republican	Mark Hatfield (incumbent)	550,615	61.66%	▲7.94
Democratic	Vernon Cook	341,616	38.26%	▼7.90
Write-in	All others	737	0.08%	
Total votes		892,968	100.00%	
Republican hold		Swing		

== See also ==
- 1978 United States Senate elections
