= Alphonse Roy =

American politician

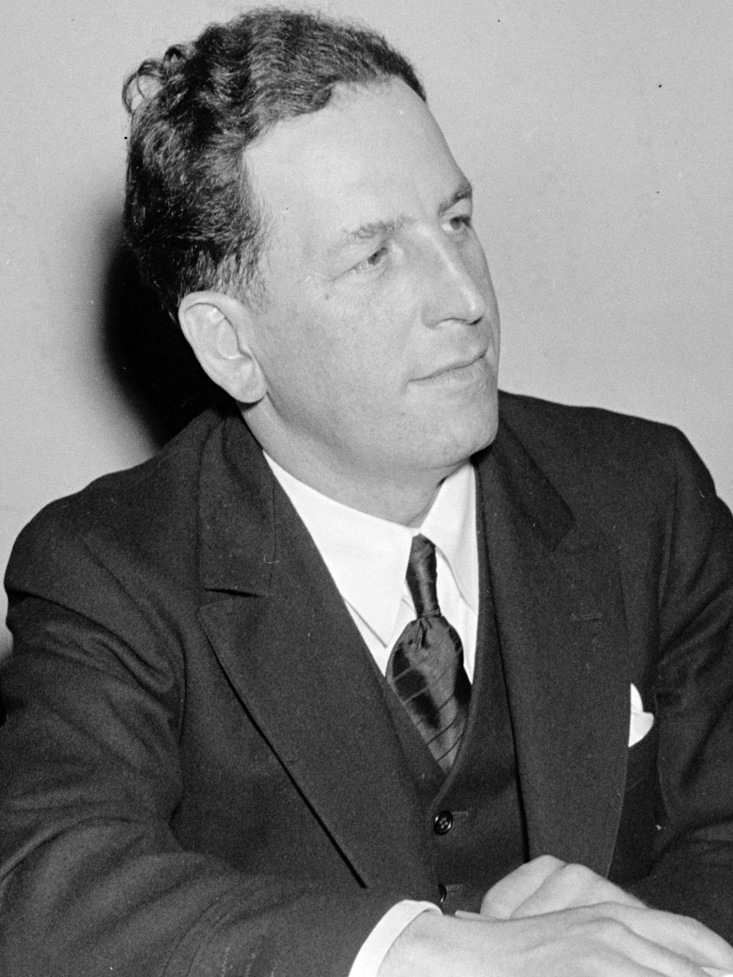

Member of the U.S. House of Representatives from New Hampshire's 1st district
- In office June 9, 1938 – January 3, 1939
- Preceded by: Arthur B. Jenks
- Succeeded by: Arthur B. Jenks

Member of the New Hampshire House of Representatives
- In office 1925-1931

Personal details
- Born: October 26, 1897 Saint-Simon, Quebec, Canada
- Died: October 5, 1967 (aged 69) Manchester, New Hampshire, U.S.
- Party: Democratic

Alphonse Roy (October 26, 1897 – October 5, 1967) was a U.S. representative from New Hampshire.

Born in Saint-Simon, Quebec, Canada, Roy moved to Manchester, New Hampshire, in 1901. He attended the parochial schools, then engaged in the real estate business.

Roy served as alderman for the city of Manchester, 1925–1931, and served as member of the New Hampshire House of Representatives, 1925–1931. He served on the Executive Council of New Hampshire, 1933–1937.

He successfully contested as a Democrat the election of Arthur B. Jenks to the Seventy-fifth Congress and served from June 9, 1938, to January 3, 1939. Roy was an unsuccessful candidate for reelection in 1938 to the Seventy-sixth Congress and for election in 1940 to the Seventy-seventh Congress.

Roy was appointed sealer of weights and measures of Manchester in 1943 and served until his resignation in 1945. He ran unsuccessfully in the 1953 Manchester mayoral election. He was United States marshal for the district of New Hampshire, 1945–1953. He was an unsuccessful candidate for election in 1958 to the Eighty-sixth Congress and an unsuccessful candidate for nomination for the United States Senate in 1960.

He engaged in the real estate business until his death in Manchester, October 5, 1967. He was interred in Mount Calvary Cemetery.

U.S. House of Representatives
Preceded by Arthur B. Jenks	U.S. Representative for the 1st district of New Hampshire; June 9, 1938 – January 3, 1939	Succeeded by Arthur B. Jenks
