= 1984 United States Senate election in Oregon =

- November 6, 1984
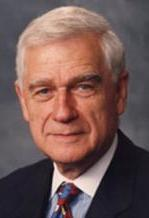

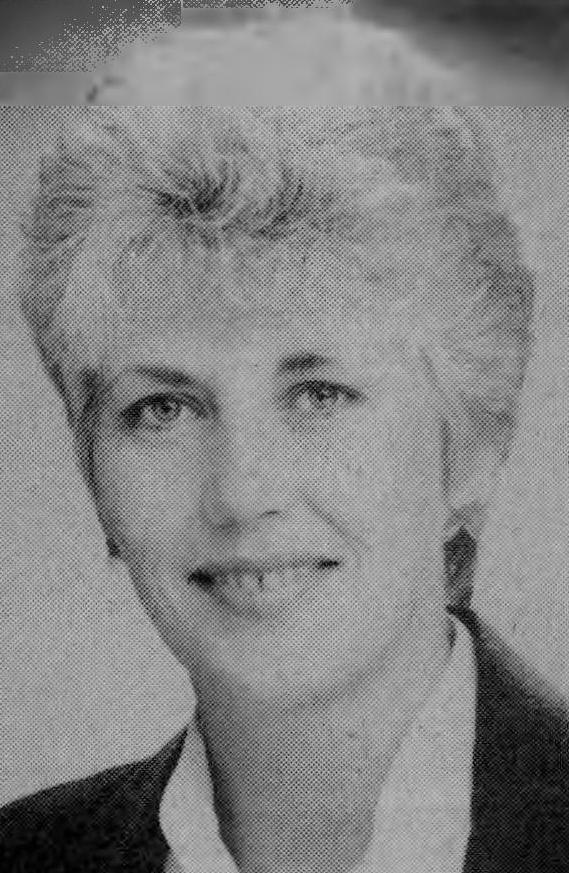
Nominee	Mark Hatfield	Margie Hendriksen
Party	Republican	Democratic
Popular vote	808,152	406,122
Percentage	66.53%	33.43%
- County results Hatfield: 60–70% 70–80%
U.S. senator before election
Mark Hatfield
Republican
Elected U.S. Senator
Mark Hatfield
Republican

The 1984 United States Senate election in Oregon took place on November 6, 1984. Incumbent Republican U.S. Senator Mark Hatfield was re-elected to a fourth term in office, defeating Democratic State Senator Margie Hendriksen. As of 2022, this is the last U.S. Senate race in Oregon where every county voted for the same candidate.

== Republican primary ==
=== Candidates ===
- Mark Hatfield, incumbent Senator
- Ralph H. Preston
- Sherry Reynolds
- John T. Schiess

=== Results ===
Democratic primary results
Party	Candidate	Votes	%
Republican	Mark Hatfield (incumbent)	214,114	78.53%
Republican	John T. Schiess	26,848	9.85%
Republican	Sherry Reynolds	18,590	6.82%
Republican	Ralph H. Preston	12,662	4.64%
Write-in	All others	423	0.16%
Total votes		272,637	100.00%

== Democratic primary ==
=== Candidates ===
- Margie Hendriksen, State Senator from Portland
- Sam Kahl

=== Results ===
Democratic primary results
Party	Candidate	Votes	%
Democratic	Margie Hendriksen	249,152	75.47%
Democratic	Sam Kahl	79,317	24.02%
Write-in	All others	1,688	0.51%
Total votes		330,157	100.00%

== General election ==
=== Campaign ===
During the campaign, Hendriksen primarily attacked Hatfield by stressing what she perceived to be flawed priorities. Hatfield was often criticized for the scandal involving Basil Tsakos, but the controversy of the scandal declined over the course of the campaign. He was also criticized by those who stressed environmental protection for his support of President Reagan's appointment of James G. Watt to the position of Secretary of the Interior. However, Hatfield's in-person campaign strategy proved successful, as he beat Hendricksen by 402,040 votes, and gained nearly double her percentage.

=== Results ===
1984 United States Senate election in Oregon
Republican	Mark Hatfield (incumbent)	808,152	66.53%	▲4.88
Democratic	Margie Hendriksen	406,122	33.43%	▼4.83
Party	Candidate	Votes	%	±%
Independent Republican	Ralph H. Preston	461	0.04%	N/A
Total votes		1,214,735	100.00%	
Republican hold		Swing		

== See also ==
- 1984 United States Senate elections
