= Robert N. Stanfield =

American politician from Oregon (1877–1945)

Robert N. Stanfield Jr.
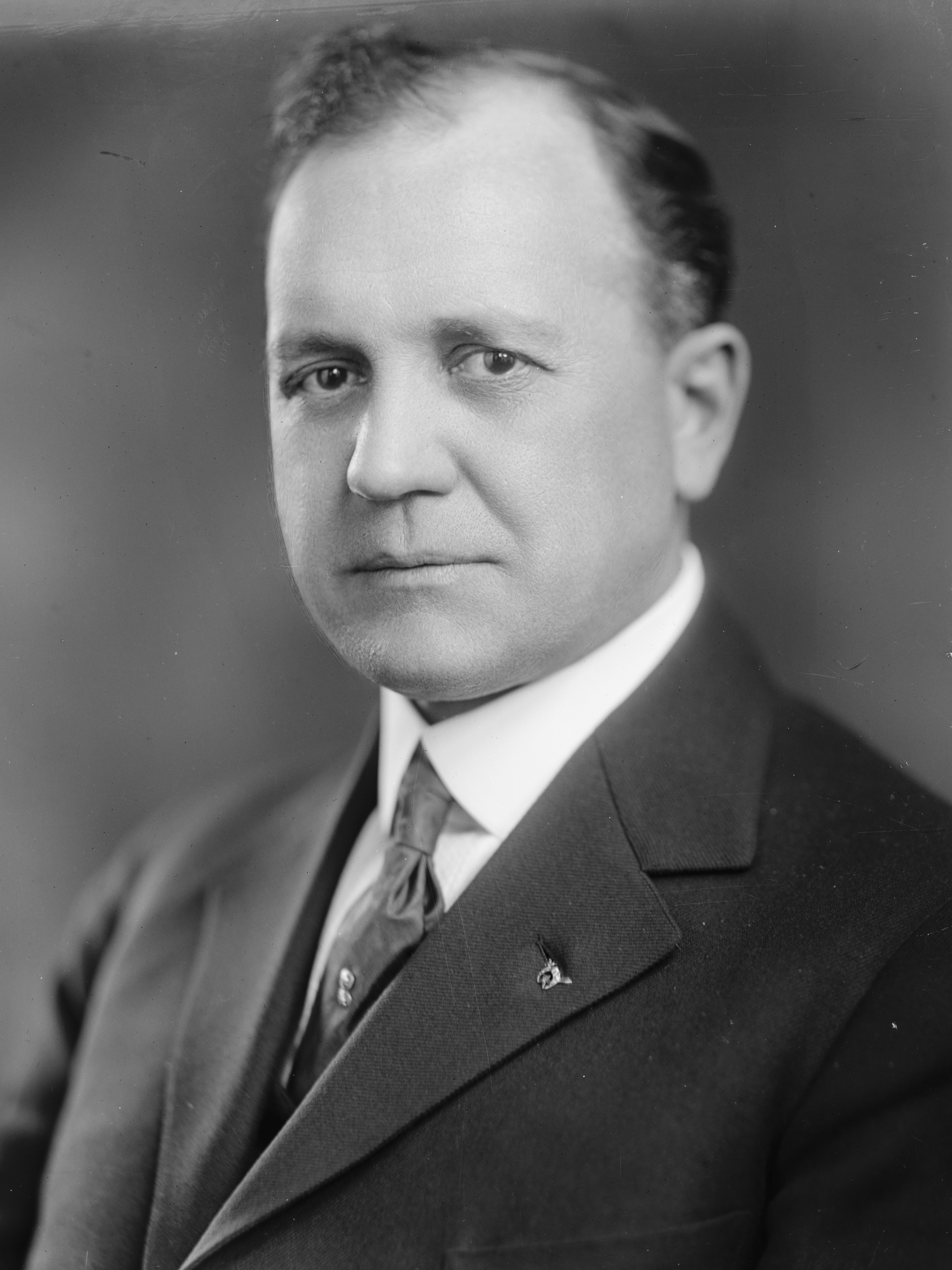

United States Senator from Oregon
- In office March 4, 1921 – March 3, 1927
- Preceded by: George E. Chamberlain
- Succeeded by: Frederick Steiwer

27th Speaker of the Oregon House of Representatives
- In office 1917–1918
- Preceded by: Ben Selling
- Succeeded by: Seymour Jones
- Constituency: Umatilla County

Member of the Oregon House of Representatives
- In office 1912-1918

Personal details
- Born: July 9, 1877 near Umatilla, Oregon, U.S.
- Died: April 13, 1945 (aged 67) Weiser, Idaho, U.S.
- Party: Republican
- Spouse: Inez Hill
- Children: Barbara Stanfield
- Profession: Sheep and Cattle Rancher

Robert Nelson Stanfield Jr. (July 9, 1877 – April 13, 1945) was an American Republican politician and rancher from the state of Oregon who served in the Oregon House of Representatives (1912–1918) including as Speaker (1917–1918) and was later elected United States Senator from Oregon (1921–1927).

== Early life ==
Robert Nelson Stanfield Jr. was born near the city of Umatilla, in Eastern Oregon on July 9, 1877, the first son of Harriet Thankful Townsend and Robert N. Stanfield Sr, the owner of a livery stable and freighting company. He lived in Umatilla until 1882 when his family moved to Pendleton, where his father ran a freight forwarding business. In 1885, the family moved to the former Buel Atwood place on Butter Creek, near Echo, Oregon. After the family moved to Butter Creek, he attended school at the Thomson School and then at the Butter Creek School built on land his father donated to the school district.

In the fall of 1895, he enrolled in the state normal school at neighboring Weston. His education was interrupted by the death of his father, Robert N. Stanfield Sr, on April 15, 1896. He left school in 1897, after completing two years, and took over management of the Stanfield ranch on Butter Creek from his mother. From the original ranch on Butter Creek, he and his brothers built up a large livestock operation with multiple ranches. He was also involved in banking in Echo and Baker. He started with cattle and then switched mainly to sheep. During World War I his flocks were estimated to include 350,000 head of sheep, making him the world's largest sheep rancher.

== Political career ==
In 1912, Stanfield was elected to the Oregon House of Representatives as a Republican representing District 22 which included Morrow and Umatilla counties. He continued in the state house through 1917, serving as Speaker during the 1917 session. The next year, he ran against Charles L. McNary for the Republican nomination to the U.S. Senate, losing in the May primary.

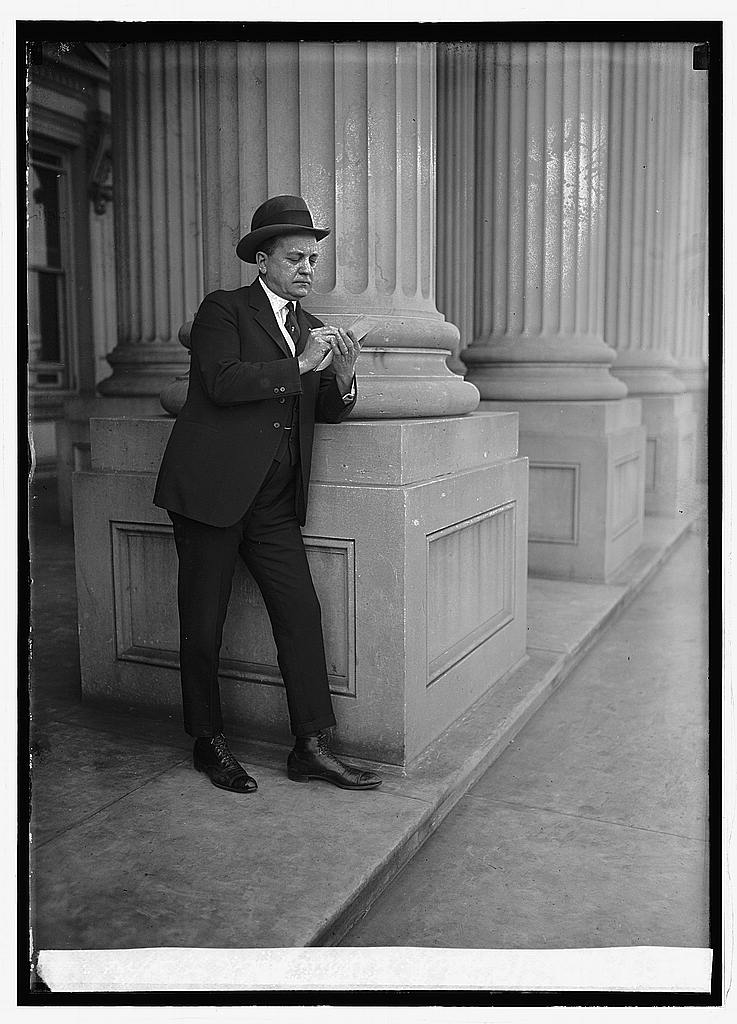
Stanfield in 1924

In 1920, Stanfield was elected as a Republican to the U.S. Senate and served from March 4, 1921, to March 3, 1927. While in the Senate he was chairman of the Committee to Examine Branches of the Civil Service (Sixty-eighth Congress) and a member of the Committee on Public Lands and Surveys (Sixty-ninth Congress). During his time in Congress, he took hearings about public land use to the western states for the first time. He considered his greatest success the construction of the Owyhee Dam and irrigation projects in Malheur County, one of the first desert land reclamation projects. His reputation was rough and ready. In the midst of prohibition, he was arrested following a drunken bar fight in Baker, Oregon. When he ran for re-election, his major opponents were the WCTU and the KKK. His admiring cowboy constituency could not elect him.

== Later years ==
He ran for the Republican nomination in 1926. He lost in the May primary election to Frederick Steiwer. He then earned a position on the general election ballot as an independent candidate. He lost to Steiwer a second time. He ran in the 1928 primary to be a candidate for Representative and was defeated again.

After Congress he returned to Oregon and resumed his former business pursuits, and in 1945 died in Weiser, Idaho. Robert Stanfield was buried at Hillcrest Cemetery in Weiser. He was survived by his wife, Inez Hill and one daughter, Barbara.

== See also ==
- Stanfield, Oregon

Party political offices
Preceded by R. A. Booth	Republican nominee for U.S. Senator from Oregon (Class 3); 1920	Succeeded by Frederick Steiwer
U.S. Senate
Preceded by George E. Chamberlain	U.S. Senator (Class 3) from Oregon; 1921–1927	Succeeded by Frederick Steiwer
