= Arthur B. Jenks =

American politician (1866–1947)

Arthur Byron Jenks
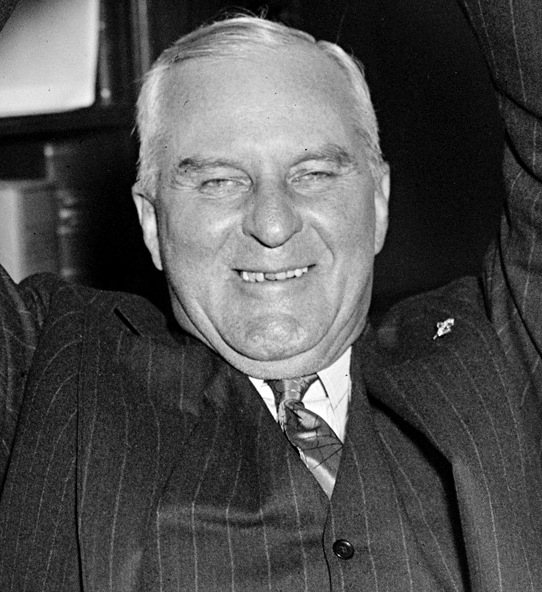

Member of the U.S. House of Representatives from New Hampshire's 1st district
- In office January 3, 1939 – January 3, 1943
- Preceded by: Alphonse Roy
- Succeeded by: Chester Earl Merrow
- In office January 3, 1937 – June 9, 1938
- Preceded by: William Nathaniel Rogers
- Succeeded by: Alphonse Roy

Personal details
- Born: October 15, 1866 West Dennis, Massachusetts
- Died: December 14, 1947 (aged 81) Manchester, New Hampshire
- Party: Republican

Arthur Byron Jenks (October 15, 1866 – December 14, 1947) was a U.S. representative from New Hampshire.

Born in West Dennis, Massachusetts, Jenks attended public schools. He was employed as a shoe worker in 1881. He engaged in the shoe manufacturing business at Manchester, New Hampshire from 1902 to 1930. He also became engaged in the banking business in 1917 in Manchester.

He was an unsuccessful candidate for election in 1934 to the Seventy-fourth Congress and in 1936 to the next Congress. In the 1936 election, Jenks first received a plurality of 550 votes, seemingly winning the contest, but after a recount the race was tied. Both Jenks and his opponent Democrat Alphonse Roy appealed to the state ballot-law commission which considered more than 100 disputed ballots before declaring Roy the winner by 17 votes. Jenks brought forward 34 more ballots, which the commission included, making Jenks the winner. Jenks was certified the winner, but Roy contested the election at the United States House of Representatives. When the new House was sworn in, Jenks was told to "stand aside", but then he was sworn in immediately afterward, after the House passed a resolution allowing for it. Following two investigations by the House Committee on Elections it was decided that Roy had won the race by 20 votes. On June 9, 1938, more than a year after the election, the House voted that Jenks was not entitled to the seat and that Roy was.

He served as delegate to the Republican National Conventions in 1936 and 1940. He was served as a Republican in the Seventy-fifth Congress from January 3, 1937, until June 9, 1938, when he was succeeded by Alphonse Roy, who contested his election.

Jenks was elected as a Republican to the Seventy-sixth and Seventy-seventh Congresses (January 3, 1939 – January 3, 1943). He was an unsuccessful candidate for renomination in 1942.

He resumed the banking business in Manchester until his death there on December 14, 1947. He was interred in Pine Grove Cemetery.

U.S. House of Representatives
Preceded by William Nathaniel Rogers	U.S. Representative for the 1st district of New Hampshire; January 3, 1937–June 9, 1938	Succeeded by Alphonse Roy
Preceded by Alphonse Roy	U.S. Representative for the 1st district of New Hampshire; January 3, 1939–January 3, 1943	Succeeded by Chester Earl Merrow
