= Frederick Steiwer =

American politician

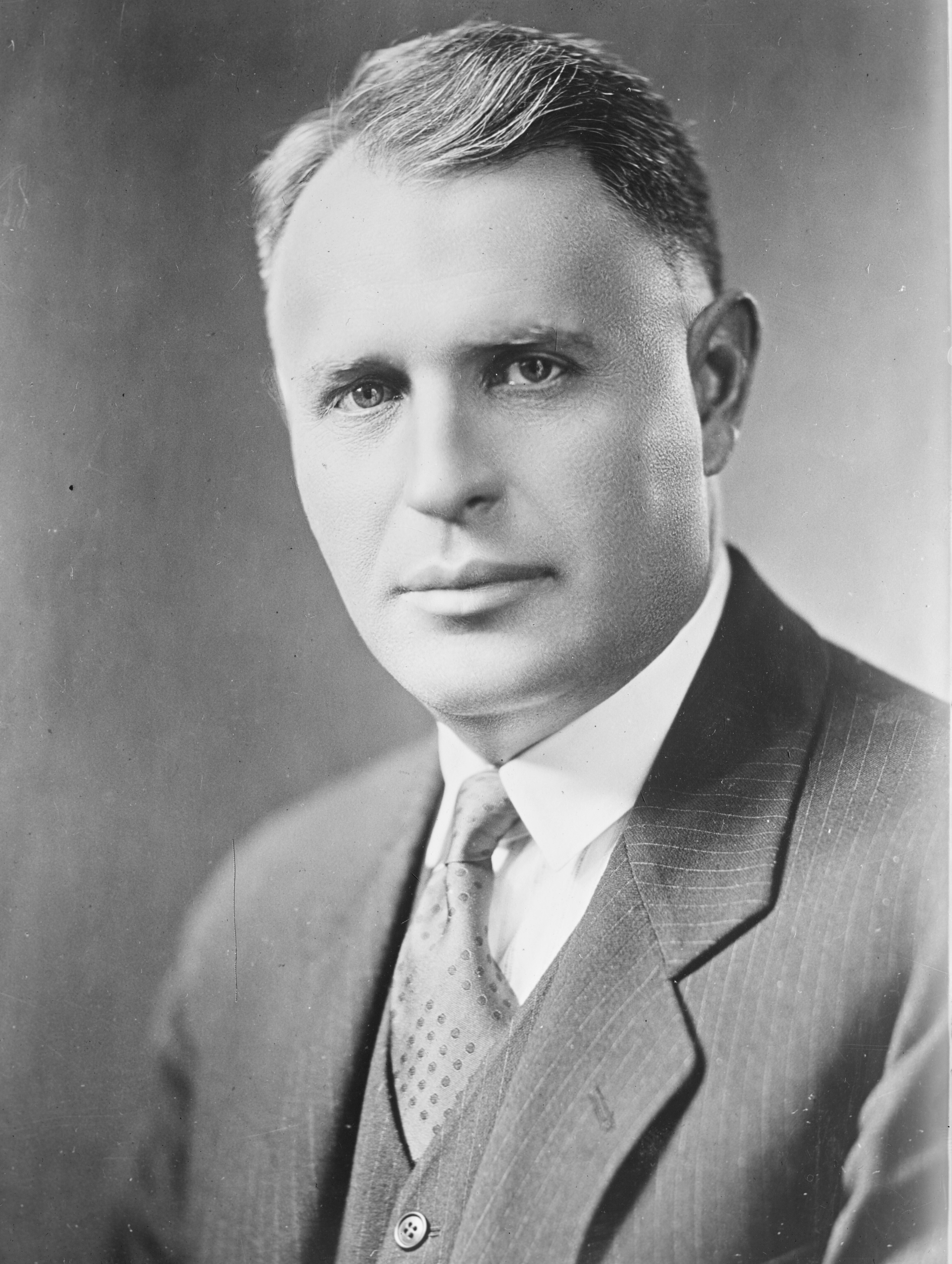

United States Senator from Oregon
- In office March 4, 1927 – January 31, 1938
- Preceded by: Robert Stanfield
- Succeeded by: Alfred Reames

Personal details
- Born: October 13, 1883 Jefferson, Oregon, U.S.
- Died: February 3, 1939 (aged 55) Washington, D.C., U.S.
- Resting place: Arlington National Cemetery
- Party: Republican
- Spouse: Freida Roesch (1911–1939)
- Children: 2
- Education: Oregon State University (BS); University of Oregon (BA)

Military service
- Allegiance: United States
- Branch/service: United States Army
- Years of service: 1917–1919
- Rank: First Lieutenant
- Unit: 65th Field Artillery Regiment
- Battles/wars: World War I

Frederick Steiwer (October 13, 1883 – February 3, 1939) was an American lawyer and Republican Party politician from the state of Oregon. He represented the state in the United States Senate from 1927 until 1938, following his resignation for health problems. He was a candidate for the Republican nomination for President of the United States in 1928 and 1936 and delivered the keynote address to the 1936 Republican National Convention.

A native of the state, he was county district attorney and member of the Oregon State Senate from eastern Oregon and a veteran of World War I. A Republican, he was elected to the United States Senate and served from 1927 to 1938. Twice a candidate for the Republican nomination to the presidency, he delivered the keynote address during the 1936 Republican National Convention.

== Early life ==
Frederick Steiwer was born on October 13, 1883 on a farm near in Marion County, Oregon near the city of Jefferson. Steiwer's parents were John F. and Ada (née May) Steiwer. He received his education in the local public schools, and entered Oregon State Agricultural College (now Oregon State University) at Corvallis at age 15 in 1898 and graduated four years later with a Bachelor of Science degree in mechanical engineering. Steiwer then attended the University of Oregon in Eugene where he earned a Bachelor of Arts degree in 1906 before attending the school's law school, then located in Portland.

In 1908, he was admitted to the Oregon State Bar and began practicing law for the Portland firm Snow & McCamant, where he had already been employed. In March 1909, he left the firm and moved to eastern Oregon where he formed a partnership with G. W. Phelps in Pendleton. A member of the Masons and a farmer, he also joined the Phi Delta Phi legal fraternity.

== Political career ==
Steiwer started his career in public office in 1909 as the deputy district attorney for Umatilla County, serving until 1910. In 1912, he was elected as the district attorney for the county and served until 1916. That year he was elected to the state senate as a Republican representing Umatilla County and District 20. Steiwer only served during the 1917 legislative session, resigning to enlist in the U.S. Army during the First World War. He served from 1917 to 1919 in the Sixty-fifth Field Artillery with rank of first lieutenant.

In 1926, Steiwer was elected as a Republican to the U.S. Senate, defeating incumbent Robert Stanfield in the primary. He won with only 39% of the vote, running against Democrat and later judge Bert Haney and Stanfield, then running for re-election as an independent. In 1928, he was one of many candidates for the Republican presidential nomination at the National Convention, with Herbert Hoover winning the nomination and then the fall election. At the 1936 Republican National Convention he was the keynote speaker and temporary chairman, as well as an unsuccessful candidate for the nomination. Steiwer was re-elected in 1932 and served from March 4, 1927, until January 31, 1938, when he resigned to return to the practice of law after suffering health problems. He had undergone gall bladder surgery in November 1936.

While in the Senate he was chairman of the Committee on Expenditures in Executive Departments (Seventy-second Congress). He also served on the Senate Judiciary Committee and helped oppose President Roosevelt's plan to pack the Supreme Court. Steiwer was an opponent of Roosevelt and The New Deal. In April 1937, he proposed an amendment to the U.S. Constitution to create a nationwide primary for selection of the candidates for the U.S. presidency and vice-presidency. No amendment was ever passed.

== Later years and family ==
On December 12, 1911, he married Frieda Roesch in Pendleton, and they had two children. One daughter, named Elizabeth, had a son who married Jeannette Watson, the daughter of Thomas J. Watson Jr. of IBM fame. His uncle was Winlock W. Steiwer, a state senator. Upon leaving the Senate, he returned to the full-time practice of law in Washington, D.C., Steiwer died in the District of Columbia at the age of 55 on February 3, 1939, and was buried at Arlington National Cemetery in neighboring Arlington, Virginia.

== See also ==
- Knight Library

Party political offices
Preceded by Robert N. Stanfield	Republican nominee for U.S. Senator from Oregon (Class 3); 1926, 1932	Succeeded by Alexander G. Barry
Preceded by Lester J. Dickinson	Keynote Speaker of the Republican National Convention; 1936	Succeeded by Harold Stassen
U.S. Senate
Preceded by Robert Stanfield	U.S. Senator (Class 3) from Oregon; 1927–1938; Served alongside: Charles L. McNary	Succeeded by Alfred Reames
Preceded by Guy D. Goff	Chair of the Senate Executive Expenditures Committee; 1931–1933	Succeeded by J. Hamilton Lewis
