= Alexander G. Barry =

American politician

Alexander Barry
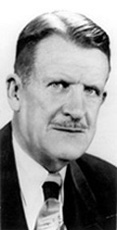

United States Senator from Oregon
- In office November 9, 1938 – January 3, 1939
- Preceded by: Alfred E. Reames
- Succeeded by: Rufus C. Holman

Member of the Oregon House of Representatives
- In office 1945–1950
- Constituency: Multnomah County

Personal details
- Born: August 23, 1892 Astoria, Oregon, U.S.
- Died: December 28, 1952 (aged 60) Portland, Oregon, U.S.
- Party: Republican

Alexander Grant Barry (August 23, 1892 – December 28, 1952) was an American attorney and politician in the state of Oregon. A native of Astoria, he was a World War I veteran and briefly a United States senator from late 1938 to early 1939. A Republican, he later served in the Oregon House of Representatives.

== Early life ==
Alexander Barry was born on August 23, 1892, in Astoria, Oregon, at the mouth of the Columbia River. After receiving his primary education in the public schools of that city and in Portland, he then attended the University of Washington in Seattle. Barry graduated and then enrolled at the University of Oregon Law School that was located in Portland at that time. He then attended the Northwest College of Law that was created after the University of Oregon's law school moved to Eugene in 1915.

Barry graduated and was admitted to the bar in 1917, entering private legal practice in Portland. The next year during World War I, he joined the Army and was commissioned a second lieutenant in the artillery. He served in the American Expeditionary Force in France and remained in the Army until February 1919. He was married and had two children by his first wife.

== Public service ==
In 1932, Barry became a member of the Oregon Relief Committee and served until in 1933. He served on the Oregon Liquor Control Commission from 1933 to 1935 and was chairman of School District No. 1 Civil Service Board in 1937 and 1938. In January 1938, Frederick Steiwer resigned from the United States Senate and was replaced by Alfred E. Reames, who was appointed by the Governor of Oregon. On November 8, 1938, the Republican Barry was elected to fill the remaining portion of Steiwer's term. Barry served in congress from November 9, 1938, until January 3, 1939. Barry was not a candidate for election to the full Senate term which was won by Rufus C. Holman.

== Later life ==
After leaving Congress Barry resumed the practice of law. In 1940, he married a second time, to Helen M. Bealey. In 1944, Barry was elected to the Oregon House of Representatives to represent Portland and Multnomah County. He served during the 1945 to 1949 sessions as the representative from District 5. On December 28, 1952, Alexander Grant Barry died in Portland and was interred at Willamette National Cemetery near Portland.

Party political offices
Preceded by Frederick Steiwer	Republican nominee for U.S. Senator from Oregon (Class 3); 1938	Succeeded by Rufus C. Holman
U.S. Senate
Preceded by Alfred E. Reames	U.S. Senator (Class 3) from Oregon; 1938–1939	Succeeded by Rufus C. Holman
