= Alfred E. Reames =

American politician

Alfred Evan Reames
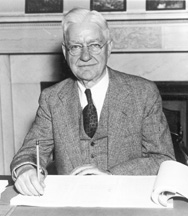

United States Senator from Oregon
- In office February 1, 1938 – November 8, 1938
- Appointed by: Charles H. Martin
- Preceded by: Frederick Steiwer
- Succeeded by: Alexander G. Barry

Personal details
- Born: February 5, 1870 Jacksonville, Oregon, U.S.
- Died: March 4, 1943 (aged 73) Medford, Oregon, U.S.
- Party: Democratic
- Spouse(s): Edith L. Tongue (m. 1891, d. 1895); Lillian L. Lanning (m. 1923)
- Profession: Attorney

Alfred Evan Reames (February 5, 1870 – March 4, 1943) was an American attorney and politician from the state of Oregon. A native Oregonian, he served as a United States senator for nine months in 1938. A Democrat, he practiced law in Portland, Eugene, and Jacksonville.

== Early life ==
Alfred Reames was born in Jacksonville, Oregon, as the son of Thomas G. Reames and Lucinda Williams on February 5, 1870. He received his primary education in the public schools of Jacksonville. For college Reames first attended University of the Pacific in California and then returned to Oregon to attend the University of Oregon in Eugene. In 1891, he married Edith L. Tongue of Hillsboro, Oregon, the daughter of former representative Thomas H. Tongue. Then in 1893 Alfred Reames earned his law degree from Washington and Lee University in Virginia. That same year he returned to Oregon and began law practice in Eugene after passing the bar.

== Legal career ==
After practicing in Eugene until 1894 he moved to Portland, Oregon, to continue practicing law. In 1895 his wife Edith died, and he returned to Jacksonville where he practiced law until 1902. From 1900 to 1908 he served as the district attorney for Josephine Jackson, Klamath, and Lake counties in southwestern Oregon. In 1911 he resumed private law practice in Medford, Oregon. There Reames became a part owner of the Deep Gravel Mining Company and president of Three Pines Timber Company. Then on February 1, 1938 Oregon Governor Charles H. Martin appointed Alfred Reames to the United States Senate to fill the vacancy created when Senator Frederick Steiwer resigned from Congress. The Democrat served until November 8, 1938, when Alexander G. Barry was elected. Reames did not run in the fall election.

== Later life ==
In 1923, Reames remarried and had one son with Lillian L. Lanning, who was from Albany, Oregon. After Congress, he returned to private practice. He was an incorporator of the Jacksonville Electric Company, responsible for the construction of the Jacksonville substation. On March 4, 1943, Alfred Evan Reames died in Medford and was buried at Siskiyou Memorial Park, also in Medford.

U.S. Senate
Preceded by Frederick Steiwer	U.S. Senator (Class 3) from Oregon; 1938	Succeeded by Alexander G. Barry
