= Edward Davis =

Edward, Ed, Eddie or Teddy Davis may refer to:

== In sports ==
- Mickey Davis (Edward J. Davis, born 1950), American basketball player
- Eddie Davis (boxer) (born 1951), light heavyweight boxer
- Eddie Davis (Canadian football) (born 1973), football player
- Ed Davis (basketball) (born 1989), American player
- Eddie Davis (cricketer) (1922–2011), English cricketer
- Peanuts Davis (Edward A. Davis, 1917–1974), American baseball player
- Teddy Davis (1923–1966), boxer
- T. Edward Davis (1898–1970), American football, basketball, and baseball coach

== In politics and government ==
- Edward Davis (Irish politician), member of the Parliament of Ireland for Clogher, 1692–1693
- Edward S. Davis (1808–1887), Massachusetts politician
- Edward M. Davis (1916–2006), California state senator and LAPD police chief
- Edward B. Davis (1933–2010), American judge
- Ed Davis (police officer) (born 1956), commissioner of the Boston Police Department
- Ed Davis (politician) (1890–1956), Washington politician
- Edward Davis (car dealer) (1911–1999), American car dealer
- Edward H. M. Davis (1846–1929), Royal Navy admiral
- Ned Davis (politician) (Edward William Davis, 1886–1961), politician in Queensland, Australia

== In entertainment ==
- Eddie "Lockjaw" Davis (1922–1986), jazz tenor saxophonist
- Eddie Davis (producer) (1926–1994), record producer and record label owner
- Eddie Davis (director) (1903–?), American director and screenwriter
- Eddy Davis (1940–2020), American jazz musician
- Teddy Davis, singer and songwriter on Labour of Love II
- Edward Thomson Davis (1833–1867), English genre painter
- Edward Le Davis, Welsh engraver and art dealer

== Other ==
- Edward Davis (buccaneer) (fl. c. 1680–1688), English buccaneer
- Edward Davis (sculptor) (1813–1878) English sculptor
- Edward Davis (bushranger) (1816–1841), Australian convict turned bushranger
- Edward H. Davis (1862–1951), field collector for the Museum of the American Indian in New York
- Edward Wilson Davis (1888–1973), American engineer and inventor
- Edward F. C. Davis (1847–1895), American mechanical engineer
- Ed Davis (criminal) (1900–1938), American burglar, bank robber and outlaw
- Ed Davis (Royal Marines officer) (born 1963), governor of Gibraltar

== See also ==
- Edwards Davis (1867–1936), American actor and former clergyman
- Ted Davis (disambiguation)
- Edward Davies (disambiguation)
