= Theodore Davis =

Theodore Davis may refer to:

- Theodore Davis (Canadian politician) (c. 1778 – 1841)
- Theodore M. Davis (1838–1915), American lawyer and archaeologist
- Theodore R. Davis (1840–1894), American artist
- T. Edward Davis (1898–1970), American football, basketball, and baseball coach

== See also ==
- Ted Davis (disambiguation)
