= Harry Hartman =

American football player and coach (born 1937)

Biographical details
- Born: March 7, 1937 (age 89)

Playing career
- 1960–1961: Salem

Coaching career (HC unless noted)
- 1965: Salem
- 1966–1976: Salem (OC)

Head coaching record
- Overall: 1–5–2

Harry Hartman (born March 7, 1937) is an American former college football player and coach. He served as the head football coach at Salem College—now known as Salem University—in Salem, West Virginia in 1965 and was an assistant at the school from 1966 to 1976.

== Head coaching record ==
Year	Team	Overall	Conference	Standing	Bowl/playoffs
Salem Tigers (West Virginia Intercollegiate Athletic Conference) (1966)
1966	Salem	1–5–2	1–4–2	8th	
Salem:		1–5–2	1–4–2		
Total:		1–5–2			
