= Stephen Monteage =

English merchant and accountant

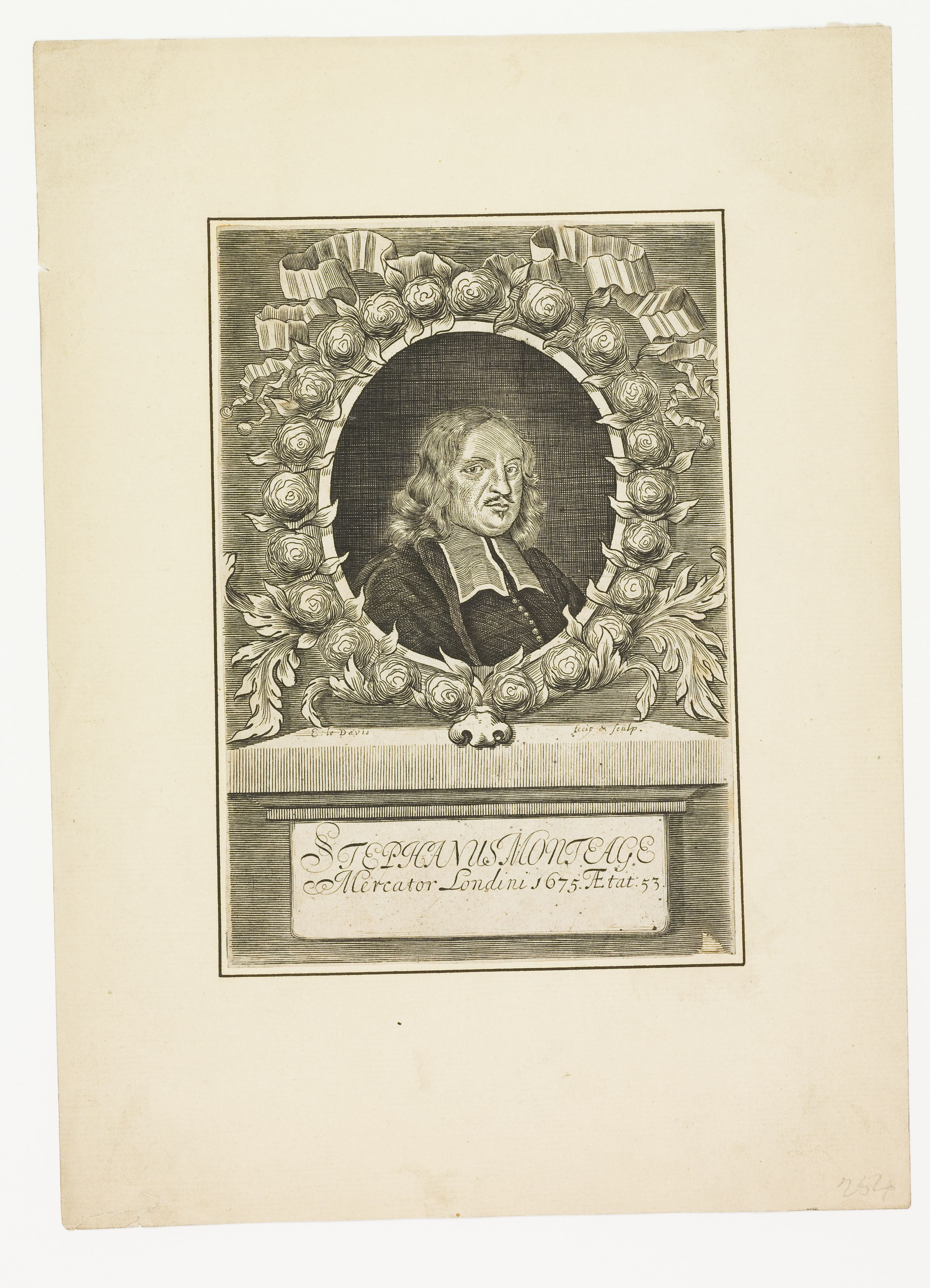
- Born: c. 1622
- Died: 21 October 1687
- Occupations: Merchant and accountant

Stephen Monteage (c. 1622 – 21 October 1687) was an English merchant and accountant.

== Biography ==
Stephen Monteage when baptised on 3 February 1621/22, was listed as Estienne Monteage at the Threadneedle Street French Protestant Church (L'Église de Threadneedle Street) in London, mother church of the expatriate French Huguenot community. He, his father and godparents are also recorded in the February 1621 monthly list of baptisms at the sister French Protestant Church (Walloon) in Spitalfields, Middlesex, England. He was the son of Estienne "Stephen" Monteage of Buckingham. Monteage was apprenticed to James Houblon, merchant, of London (Addit. MS. 29559, f. 175), with whose family he remained on terms of friendship all his life.

Monteage was the second husband of Jane Deane (died 1670), who was a daughter of Edward Deane of Pinnock in Gloucestershire (he also had holdings nearby at Temple Guiting), and sister of Richard Deane, General-at-Sea. Jane's first husband had served as Secretary to Jane's brother Richard Deane and Robert Blake, Generals-at-Sea / Admirals. Dru Sparrow was killed in action at Blake’s feet aboard the flagship Triumph on 18 February 1652 (Old Style) / 1653 (New Style) during the pivotal three-day Battle of Portland.

Monteage did much towards bringing into general use the method of keeping accounts by double entry. In 1670 he was residing in Broad Street, London (ib. 29552, f. 406), and in 1677 in Winchester Street. He was agent to Christopher Hatton, 1st Viscount Hatton (1632–1706), and his letters in that capacity are now in the British Museum. Monteage was as zealous in small matters as large; his letters are as precise in detail whether they refer to the extra yard or two of velvet which he saved by personally superintending the cutting-out of Lord Hatton's robe for the coronation of James II (ib. 29561, ff. 91–132), or to the large sums required for the payment of the troops in Guernsey.

Monteage died on 21 October 1687, and was buried in the church of All Hallows-on-the-Wall (parish register). He left several children. His eldest son, Dean Monteage, succeeded him as agent to Lord Hatton, and was accomptant-general to the commissioners of excise. Another son, John, who had been "very chargeable in his education and travels abroad," was in business as a merchant in January 1687, and was residing in Bond's Court, Walbrook, in 1694. Monteage also left two daughters. His grandson, Stephen Monteage (born 5 July 1681, son of Dean Monteage), was in 1735 stock accountant to the York Buildings Company of which company he was also a "proprietor." He was in 1738 employed on the accounts of the South Sea Company, and later on in the customs.

Monteage published:

- "Debtor and Creditor," London, 1675, to which his portrait, engraved by Edward Le Davis, is prefixed.
- "Instructions for Rent-gatherers" Accompts, &c., made easie,' London, 1683.
