= Flinderation, West Virginia =

Unincorporated community in West Virginia, United States

- Unincorporated community
- Location within West Virginia Location within the United States
- Coordinates: 39°17′52″N 80°30′44″W
- Country: United States
- State: West Virginia
- County: Harrison
- Elevation: 1,014 ft (309 m)
- Time zone: UTC-5 (Eastern (EST))
  - Summer (DST): UTC-4 (EDT)
- Area codes: 304 & 681
- GNIS feature ID: 1554475

Flinderation is an unincorporated community in Harrison County, West Virginia, United States. Flinderation is located on County Route 50/7, 2.7 miles (4.3 km) east-northeast of Salem.
