= Theodore R. Davis =

American artist

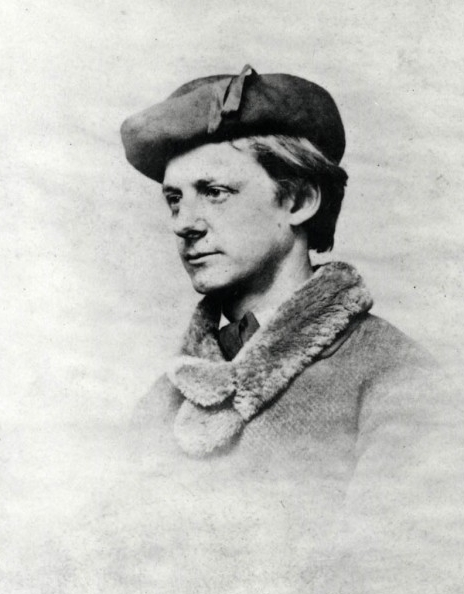
- Born: Theodore Russel Davis; 1840; Boston, Massachusetts, United States
- Died: 1894 (aged 53–54); Asbury Park, New Jersey, United States

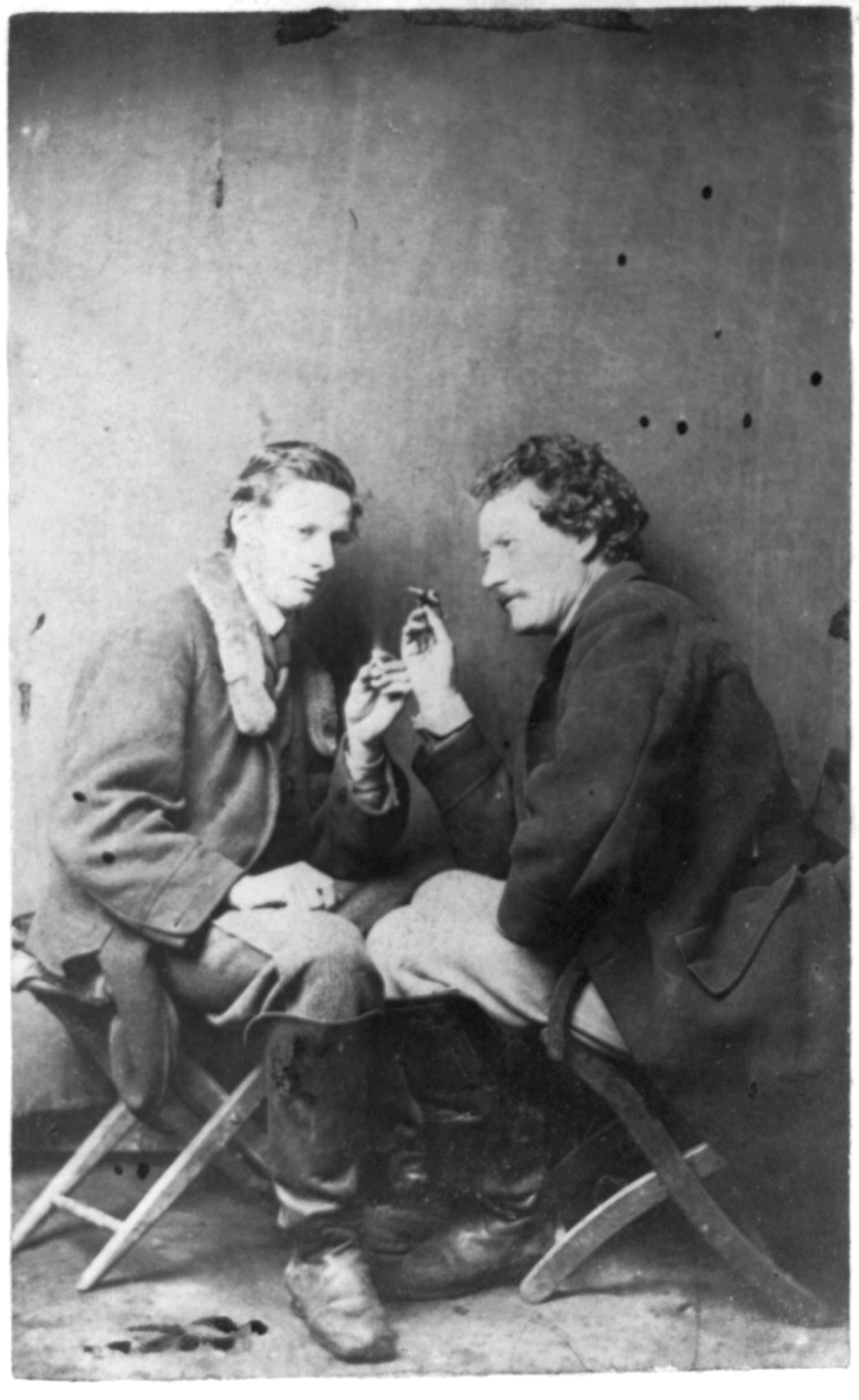
Theodore Davis and James Walker, seated on camp stools

Theodore Russel Davis (1840–1894) was a 19th-century American artist, who made numerous eye-witness drawings of significant military and political events during the American Civil War and its aftermath.

== Early years ==
As a child, Theodore R. Davis was taken to Washington, D.C., where he graduated from Rittenhouse Academy. At age fifteen, he moved to Brooklyn, New York. In New York City he studied illustration art with Henry Walker Herrick (1824–1906) and received informal training from James Walker (1819–1889), who acquired prominence as a military painter after the Mexican–American War.

== War ==
After the beginning of the American Civil War, Davis was hired by Harpers Weekly in 1861 as a special artist to sketch the war events.

Before the actual fighting erupted, he managed to visit the South pretending working for The Illustrated London News, with William Howard Russell, a British correspondent, and made sketches of life in Charleston, Savannah, Montgomery, Pensacola, and New Orleans. Throughout the war, he traveled extensively the eastern and western theaters documenting the Battle of Port Royal, the fight between the Monitor and the Merrimac, the Siege of Corinth and the Siege of Vicksburg, among others. He was with the Union forces during the battles of Antietam and Chickamauga and took part in Sherman's March to the Sea.

His first war illustration was published in Harper's Weekly in May 1861; altogether he submitted 252 drawings. Some of these drawings include the Battle of Champion Hill, and the most significant sketch of General Joseph E. Johnston and General William T. Sherman meeting at the Bennett Farm near Durham Station to discuss the surrender terms of the remaining Confederate armies in the Southeast.

During the war, Theodore Davis was injured several times, and once a bullet ripped his sketchbook out of his hands. He wrote in How A Battle Is Sketched,

To really see a battle, however, one must accept the most dangerous situations, for in most cases this can not possibly be avoided. ... My most peculiar experience of this sort was having a sketch-book shot out of my hand and sent whirling over my shoulder. At another time, one chilly night after the day of a hard battle, as I lay shivering on the ground with a single blanket over me, a forlorn soldier begged and received a share of the blanket. I awoke at daybreak to find the soldier dead, and from the wound it was plain that but for the intervention of his head the bullet would have gone through my own.

Gen. John A. Logan said, "Unquestionably Mr. Davis saw more of the war than any other single person."

== Post-war ==
After the Civil War, Theodore Davis spent a short time illustrating Reconstruction activities in the South and traveled with Generals George Armstrong Custer, and Winfield Scott Hancock during their campaigns against the Indians in the West.

When the Atlanta Cyclorama in Atlanta, Georgia was being painted, Davis was asked for ideas stemming from his travels with Sherman's army; he was added to the painting. He worked with panoramic painters such as Friedrich Wilhelm Heine and August Lohr on larger projects.

Davis was an early tourist to the Adirondack Mountains, where he took an interest in mountaineering. He made the earliest recorded ascent of Santanoni Peak along with guide Dave Hunter in 1866.

Davis was chosen to create china dinnerware for First Lady Lucy Hayes, wife of president Rutherford B. Hayes. Davis suggested using American flora and fauna and produced 130 designs of animals, plants, and scenic views. At the time the cost for the order came out to $3,150. A guest named Clover Adams, a Washington, D.C. socialite, famously observed that when she dined at the White House, she could hardly eat her soup peacefully from a Davis-designed plate as she had to watch a coyote leaping from behind the tree.

Theodore R. Davis death resulted from Bright's disease; he died at Asbury Park, New Jersey, aged fifty-four.

== Selection of wood engravings from Harper's Weekly ==
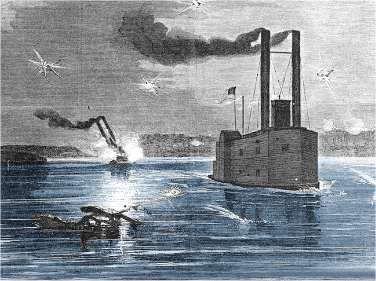
USS Lancaster follows her sister ship Switzerland past the Vicksburg batteries, 25 March 1863

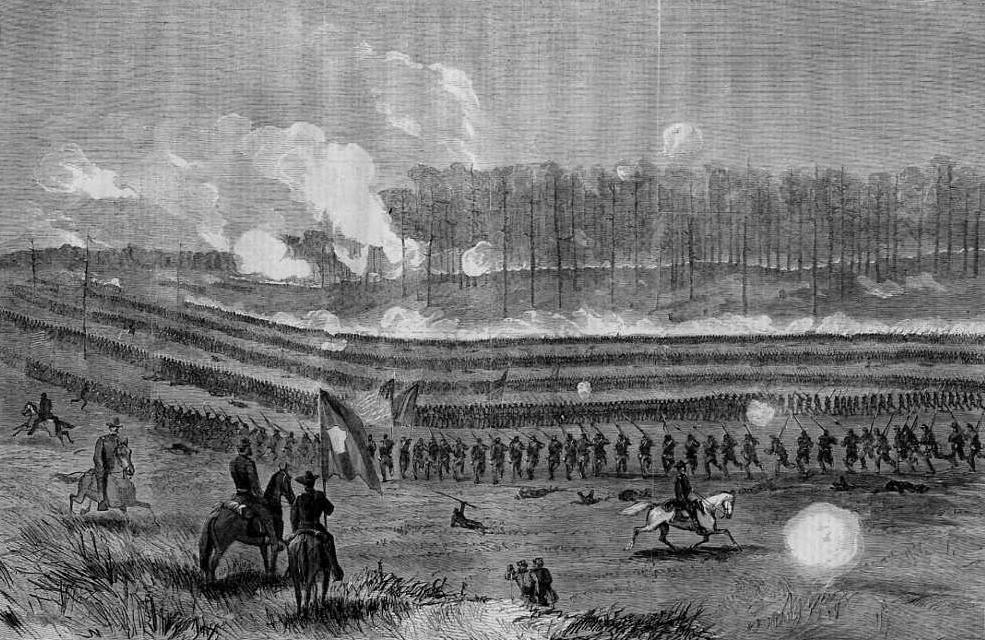
Attack on the Enemy's Centre, Near Marietta, Georgia, 1864

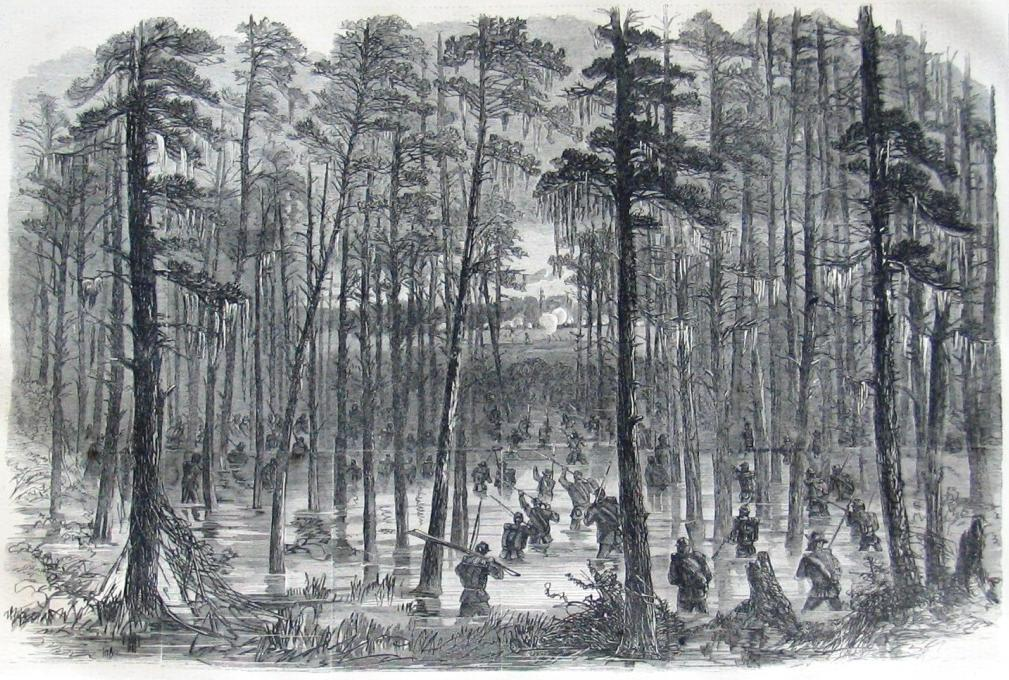
Charge of Weaver's Brigade Across the Salkehatchie, 1865

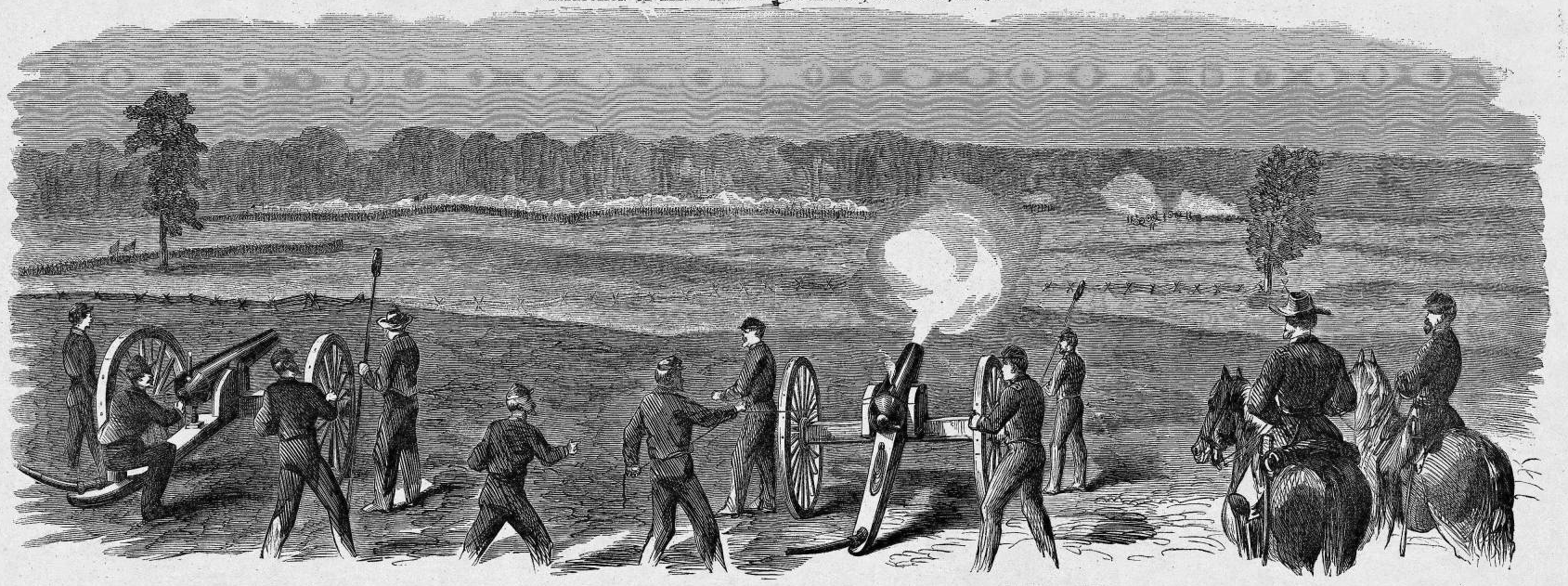
Davis' drawing of the Battle of Champion Hill.

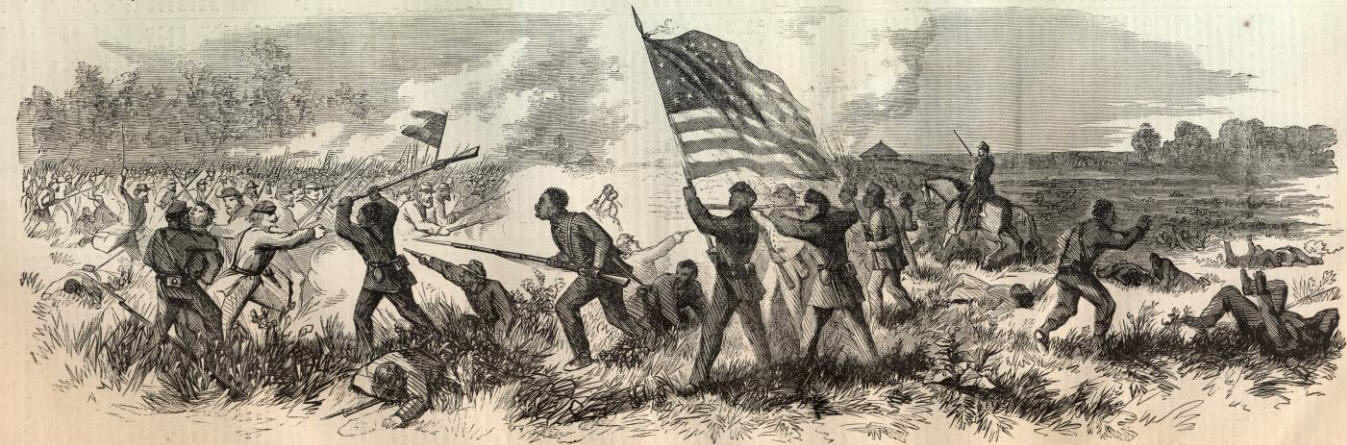
Battle of Milliken's Bend

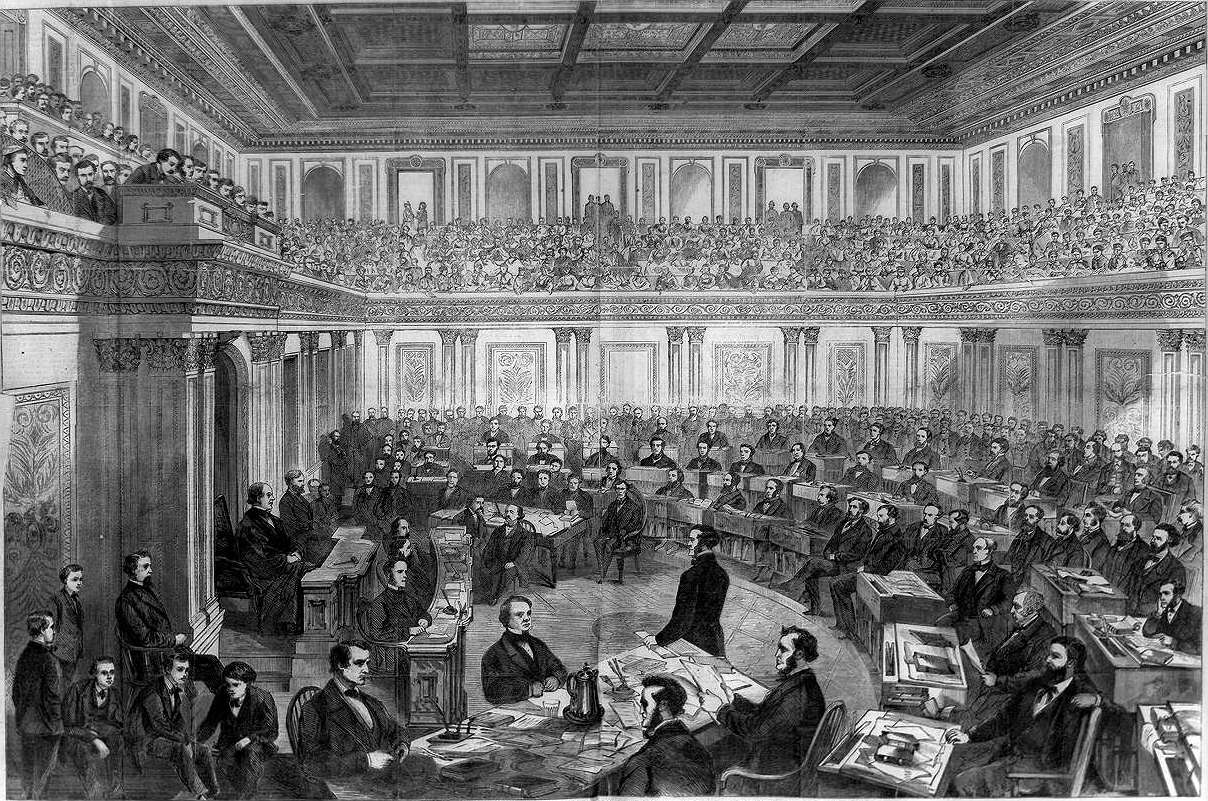
Andrew Johnson's Impeachment Trial in the Senate, 1868

== China design ==
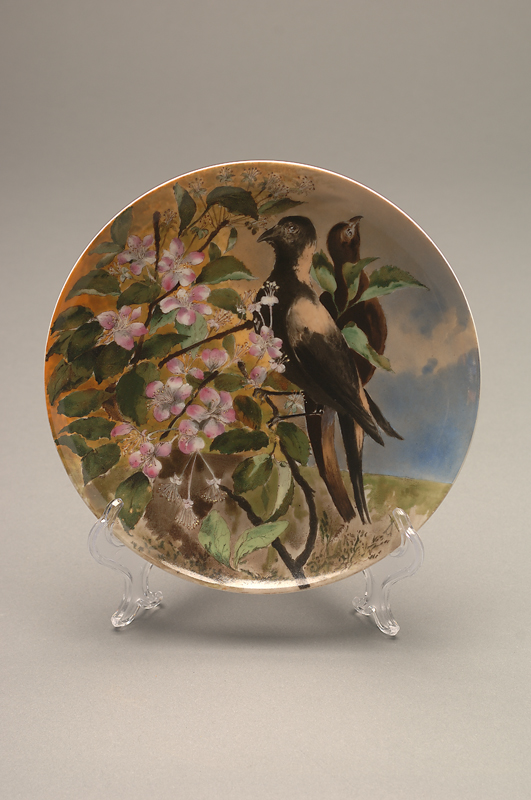
Dinner plate designed for Lucy Hayes

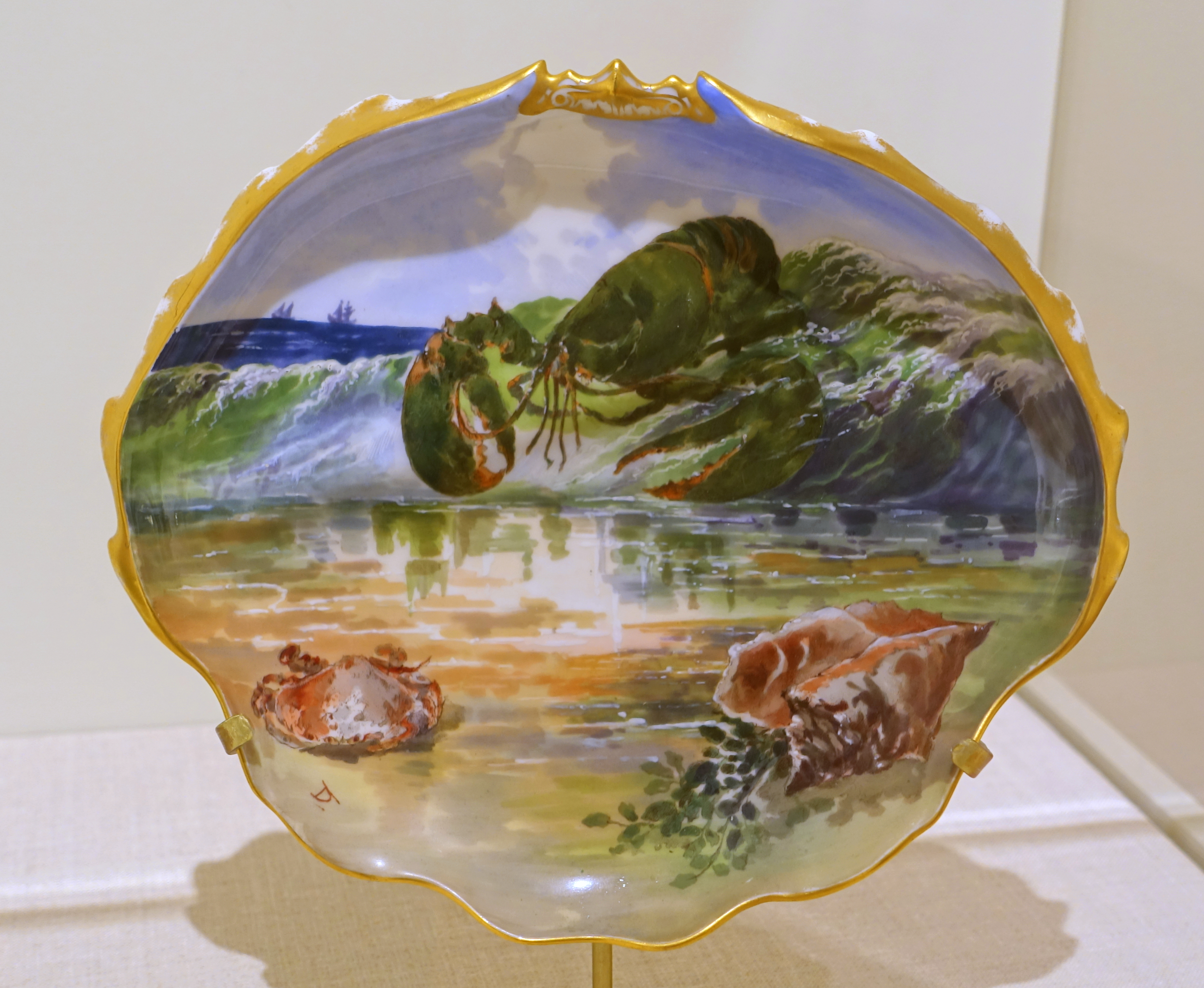
Seafood salad plate
