= Salem Historic District (Salem, West Virginia) =

Historic district in West Virginia, United States

- U.S. National Register of Historic Places
- U.S. Historic district
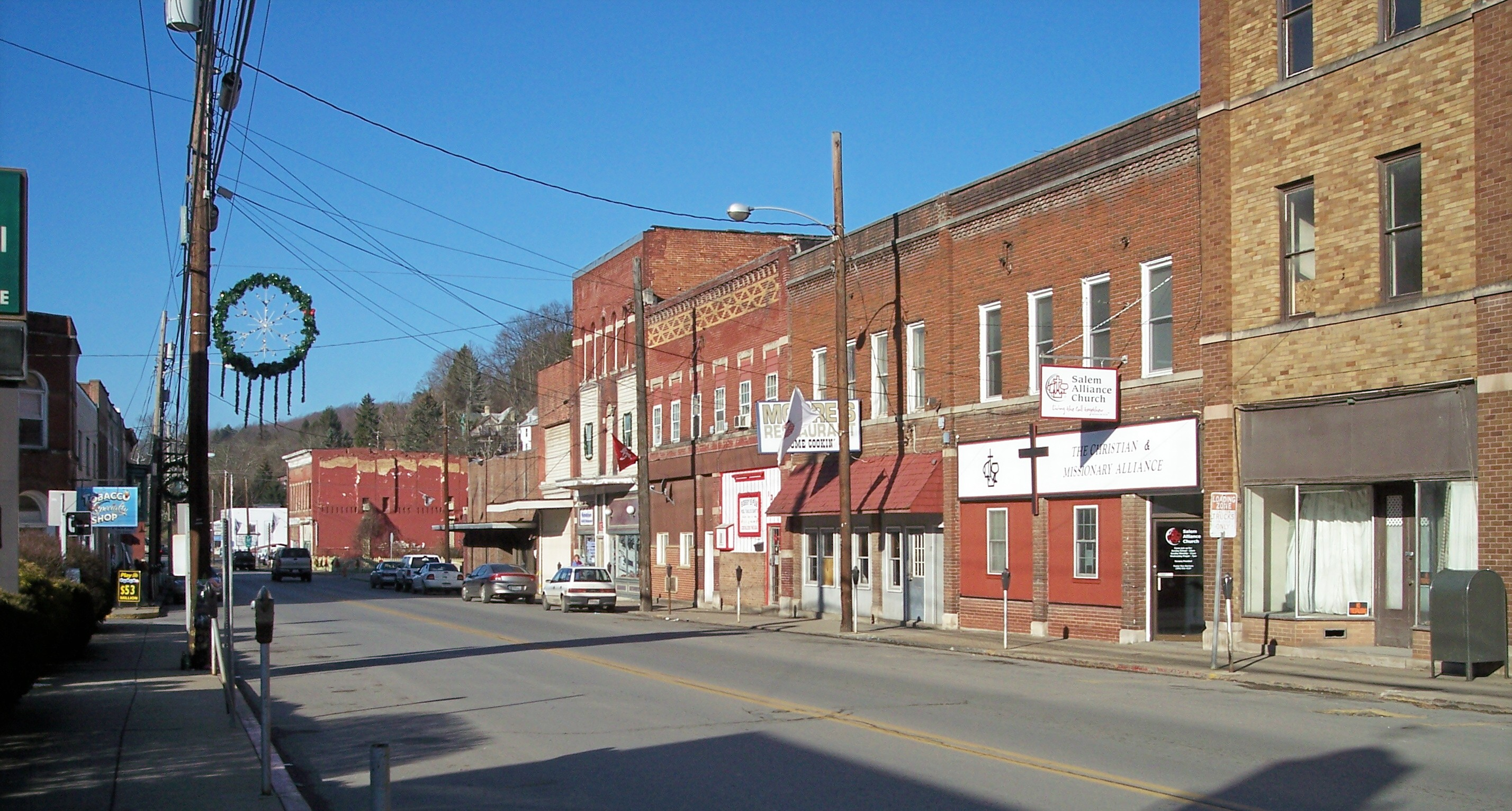
- Salem, West Virginia, December 2006

- Location within West Virginia Location within the United States
- Location: WV 23, Salem, West Virginia
- Coordinates: 39°16′58″N 80°33′32″W
- Area: 14.8 acres (6.0 ha)
- Built: 1902
- Architect: Multiple
- Architectural style: Queen Anne, Romanesque
- NRHP reference No.: 80004022
- Added to NRHP: December 2, 1980

Salem Historic District is a national historic district located at Salem, Harrison County, West Virginia. The district encompasses 28 contributing buildings in the central business district developed after a devastating fire in 1902. The district is almost exclusively commercial, with the exception of a few residences. Notable buildings include the B & O Railroad Station (1912), Cozy Corner (c. 1902), Salem Baptist Church (c. 1913), First National Bank (c. 1902), U.S. Post Office (c. 1941), Brissey Insurance Building (c. 1902), Wilson Building (c. 1902), and the Queen Anne style Pearcy-Randolph House (c. 1900), former home of Senator Jennings Randolph.

It was listed on the National Register of Historic Places in 1980.
