= Fort New Salem =

- Location within West Virginia
- 39°17′22″N 80°33′56″W
- Location: Salem, West Virginia, U.S.

History
- Built: 1792

Site notes
- Governing body: Salem University

Fort New Salem is a frontier settlement of nineteenth century log structures located in Salem, Harrison County, West Virginia, United States, adjacent to Salem International University.

Work on the village of over 18 relocated log structures began in 1971. The Fort opened to the public in 1974, as a part of Salem College (now known as Salem International University). The site is approximately eight acres, now owned by the Fort New Salem Foundation, Inc. It is now a history museum.
