= 1978 United States Senate election in West Virginia =

- November 7, 1978
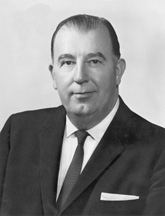

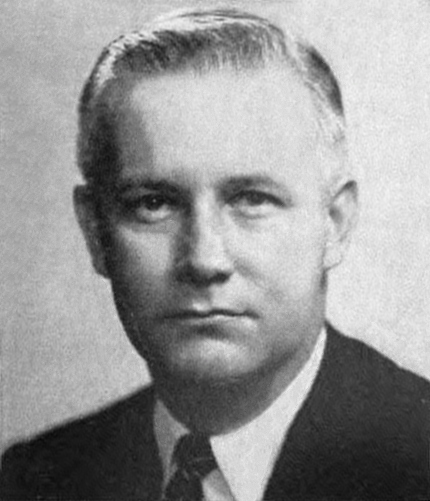
Nominee	Jennings Randolph	Arch Moore
Party	Democratic	Republican
Popular vote	249,034	244,317
Percentage	50.48%	49.52%
- County results Randolph: 50–60% 60–70% Moore: 50–60% 60–70% 70–80%
U.S. senator before election
Jennings Randolph
Democratic
Elected U.S. Senator
Jennings Randolph
Democratic

The 1978 United States Senate election in West Virginia took place on November 7, 1978. Incumbent Democratic U.S. Senator Jennings Randolph was re-elected to a fifth term and a fourth full term in office, narrowly defeating Republican former Governor Arch Moore. Despite his defeat, Moore's daughter, Shelley Moore Capito, would later win election to this seat in 2014, becoming the first female Senator from the state. This was the closest of the five contests Randolph faced for a full term.

== Democratic primary ==
=== Candidates ===
- Jennings Randolph, incumbent U.S. Senator
- Sharon Rogers

=== Results ===
1978 Democratic Senate primary
Party	Candidate	Votes	%
Democratic	Jennings Randolph (incumbent)	181,480	80.49%
Democratic	Sharon Rogers	43,991	19.51%
Total votes		225,471	100.00%

== Republican primary ==
=== Candidates ===
- Donald G. Michels
- Arch Moore, former Governor of West Virginia

=== Results ===
1978 Democratic Senate primary
Party	Candidate	Votes	%
Republican	Arch Moore	90,406	90.57%
Republican	Donald G. Michels	9,414	9.43%
Total votes		99,820	100.00%

== General election ==
=== Results ===
General election results
Party	Candidate	Votes	%	±%
Democratic	Jennings Randolph (incumbent)	249,034	50.48%	▼15.97
Republican	Arch Moore	244,317	49.52%	▲15.97
Total votes		493,351	100.00%	
Democratic hold				

== See also ==
- 1978 United States Senate elections
