= 1972 United States Senate election in West Virginia =

- November 7, 1972
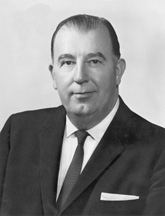

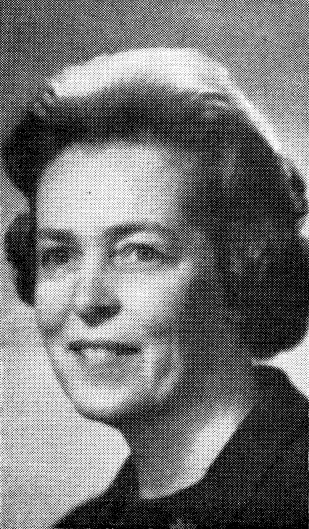
Nominee	Jennings Randolph	Louise Leonard
Party	Democratic	Republican
Popular vote	486,310	245,531
Percentage	66.45%	33.55%
- County results Randolph: 50–60% 60–70% 70–80% Leonard: 50–60% 60–70%
U.S. senator before election
Jennings Randolph
Democratic
Elected U.S. Senator
Jennings Randolph
Democratic

The 1972 United States Senate election in West Virginia took place on November 7, 1972. West Virginia was one of fifteen states, alongside Alabama, Arkansas, Colorado, Delaware, Georgia, Iowa, Louisiana, Maine, Minnesota, Mississippi, Montana, New Hampshire, Rhode Island and South Dakota, that were won by Republican President Richard Nixon in 1972 that elected a Democrat to the United States Senate. Incumbent Democratic U.S. Senator Jennings Randolph was re-elected to a fourth term and a third full term, defeating Louise Leonard in a landslide. This was the only United States Senate election in West Virginia that Randolph won by more than 60% of the vote.

== Primary elections ==
=== Democratic primary ===
==== Candidate ====
- Jennings Randolph, incumbent U.S. senator

==== Results ====
Democratic Party primary results
Party	Candidate	Votes	%
Democratic	Jennings Randolph (incumbent)	295,017	100.00%

=== Republican primary ===
==== Candidate ====
- Louise Leonard, incumbent state senator

==== Results ====
Republican Party primary results
Party	Candidate	Votes	%
Republican	Louise Leonard	112,814	100.00%

== General election ==
=== Results ===
General election results
Party	Candidate	Votes	%	±%
Democratic	Jennings Randolph (incumbent)	486,310	66.45	▲5.94
Republican	Louise Leonard	245,531	33.55	▼6.95
Total votes		731,841	100.00%	
Democratic hold				

== See also ==
- 1972 United States Senate elections
