= Hiram N. Breed =

American politician (1809–1893)

Hiram Nichols Breed
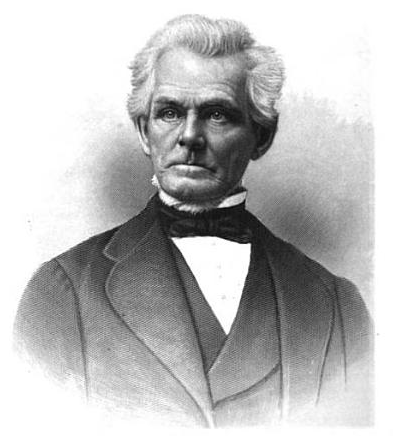

9th Mayor of Lynn, Massachusetts
- In office January 7, 1861 – January 6, 1862
- Preceded by: Edward S. Davis
- Succeeded by: Peter M. Neal

Member of the Lynn, Massachusetts Board of Aldermen
- In office May 14, 1850 – June 16, 1852

Member of the Lynn, Massachusetts Board of Selectmen

Personal details
- Born: September 2, 1809 Lynn, Massachusetts
- Died: March 31, 1893 (aged 83)
- Party: Workingmen's Party
- Spouse: Nancy Stone
- Occupation: Cordwainer

Hiram Nichols Breed (2 September 1809 – 31 March 1893) was a Massachusetts cordwainer and politician who served as the ninth Mayor of Lynn, Massachusetts. He also served as a member of the Massachusetts House of Representatives and the Massachusetts Constitutional Convention of 1853.

== Notes ==
Political offices
Preceded by Edward S. Davis	9th Mayor of Lynn, Massachusetts; January 7, 1861 to January 6, 1862	Succeeded by Peter M. Neal
