= Ted Davis =

Ted or Teddy Davis may refer to:

- Ted Davis (American football) (1942–2019), American college and National Football League player
- Ted Davis (footballer) (1892–?), British goalkeeper
- Ted Davis (sportscaster), American radio announcer
- Ted Davis Jr. (born 1950), American politician in the North Carolina House of Representatives
- Teddy Davis (1923–1966), American featherweight boxer
- H. Ted Davis (1937–2009), American professor and engineer

== See also ==
- Edward Davis (disambiguation)
- Theodore Davis (disambiguation)
