= Santanoni Peak =

Mountain in New York, US

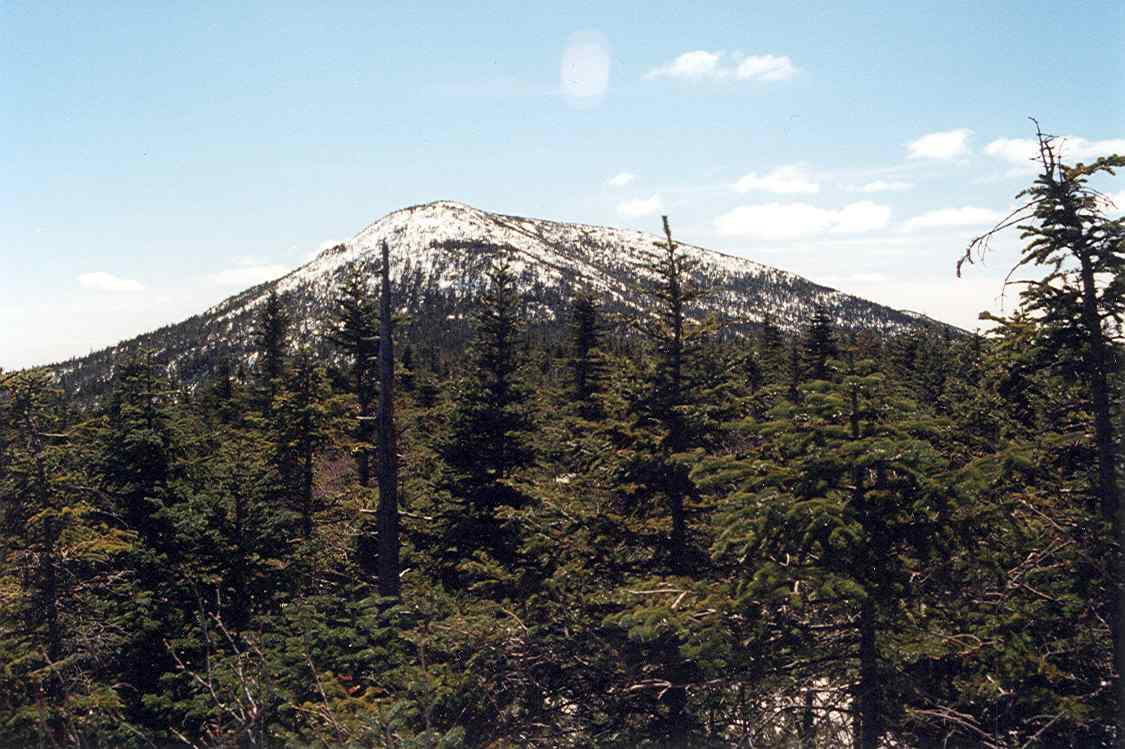
- Santanoni seen from the ridge between Santanoni and Times Square

Highest point
- Elevation: 4,607 ft (1,404 m) NGVD 29
- Listing: Adirondack High Peaks 14th
- Coordinates: 44°4.95′N 74°7.87′W

Geography
- Location within New York Adirondack Park Location within the United States
- Location: Newcomb, Essex County, New York
- Parent range: Santanoni Range
- Topo map: USGS Santanoni Peak

Climbing
- First ascent: 1866, by Dave Hunter and Theodore R. Davis

Santanoni is also the name of the Santanoni Preserve, the 13,000-acre (53 km^{2}) once-private preserve that contained Santanoni Peak.

Santanoni Peak is a mountain located in the Santanoni Range of the Adirondacks in the U.S. state of New York. It is the fourteenth-highest peak in New York, with an elevation of 4,607 ft (1,404 m), and one of the 46 High Peaks in Adirondack Park. It is located in the town of Newcomb in Essex County. Santanoni Peak is flanked to the north by Panther Peak and to the northwest by Couchsachraga Peak, the other two mountains of the Santanoni Range. The mountain's name is believed to be an Abenaki derivative of "Saint Anthony"; the first French fur traders and missionaries having named the area for Saint Anthony of Padua. The name first appeared in print in 1838, but may have been used much earlier. The earliest recorded ascent of the mountain was made in 1866 by artist and writer Theodore R. Davis and mountain guide Dave Hunter.

Two hiking approaches exist to the summit, which allow the mountain to be climbed in a loop with the other peaks of the range. Beginning at a parking lot near the Upper Works trailhead, the Duck Hole via Bradley Pond Trail approaches the mountains. Both approaches to Santanoni Peak branch off from this trail.

== Climate ==
Climate data for Santanoni Peak 44.0854 N, 74.1311 W, Elevation: 4,222 ft (1,287 m) (1991–2020 normals)
| Month | Jan | Feb | Mar | Apr | May | Jun | Jul | Aug | Sep | Oct | Nov | Dec | Year |
|---|---|---|---|---|---|---|---|---|---|---|---|---|---|
| Mean daily maximum °F (°C) | 19.4 (−7.0) | 21.0 (−6.1) | 28.8 (−1.8) | 43.9 (6.6) | 56.5 (13.6) | 64.6 (18.1) | 68.6 (20.3) | 67.2 (19.6) | 61.7 (16.5) | 49.2 (9.6) | 34.1 (1.2) | 24.8 (−4.0) | 45.0 (7.2) |
| Daily mean °F (°C) | 11.0 (−11.7) | 12.5 (−10.8) | 20.4 (−6.4) | 33.8 (1.0) | 46.5 (8.1) | 55.5 (13.1) | 60.0 (15.6) | 58.6 (14.8) | 52.5 (11.4) | 40.5 (4.7) | 27.3 (−2.6) | 17.6 (−8.0) | 36.4 (2.4) |
| Mean daily minimum °F (°C) | 2.6 (−16.3) | 4.0 (−15.6) | 11.9 (−11.2) | 23.8 (−4.6) | 36.6 (2.6) | 46.4 (8.0) | 51.3 (10.7) | 50.0 (10.0) | 43.4 (6.3) | 31.8 (−0.1) | 20.5 (−6.4) | 10.3 (−12.1) | 27.7 (−2.4) |
| Average precipitation inches (mm) | 4.87 (124) | 3.80 (97) | 4.34 (110) | 5.03 (128) | 5.62 (143) | 6.49 (165) | 5.74 (146) | 5.60 (142) | 5.27 (134) | 6.14 (156) | 5.13 (130) | 5.34 (136) | 63.37 (1,611) |
Source: PRISM Climate Group

== Gallery ==
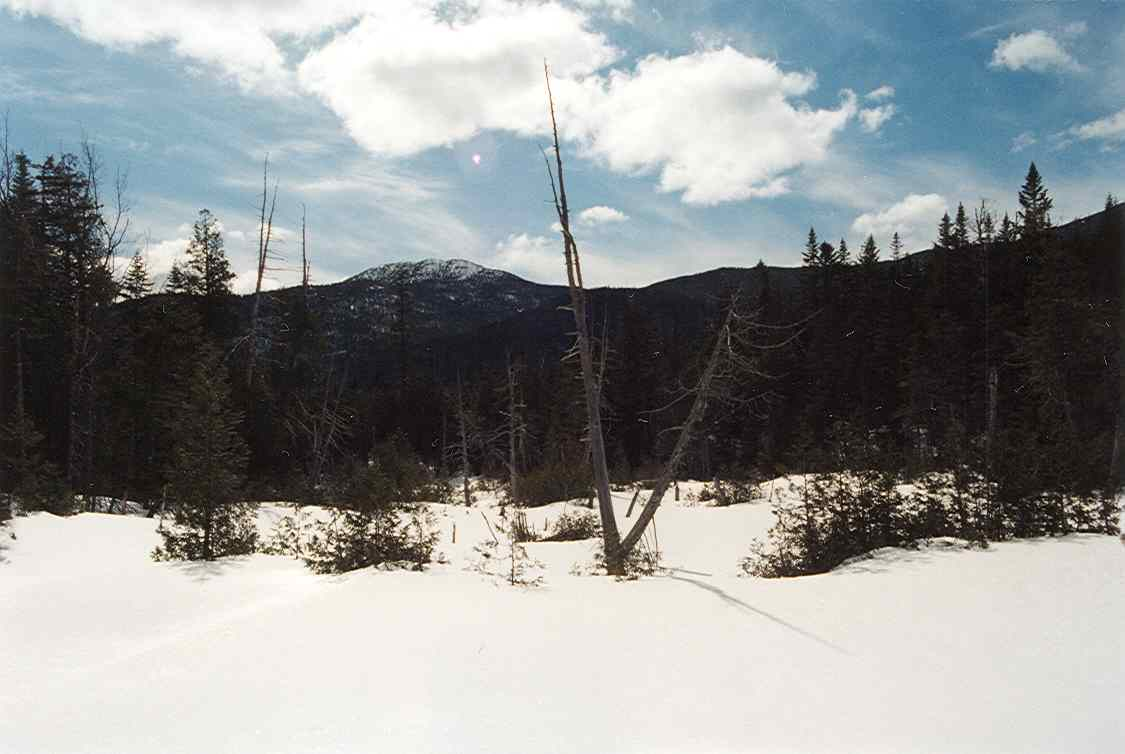
Santanoni Peak seen from Bradley Pond

== See also ==
- List of mountains in New York
- Northeast 111 4,000-footers
- Adirondack High Peaks
- Adirondack Forty-Sixers
