= Moses Pitt =

English bookseller

Moses Pitt (c. 1639–1697) was a bookseller and printer known for the production of his Atlas of the world, a project supported by the Royal Society, and in particular by Christopher Wren. He is also known as the author of The Cry of the Oppressed (1691), an account of the conditions in which imprisoned debtors lived in debtors' jails in England.

== Early life ==
Pitt originated from St Teath, Cornwall, and began publishing in 1667 from his base in Little Britain, London.

== Publications ==
His work was characterised by its learned content and included authors such as Robert Boyle and Gilbert Burnet. His Atlas was initially intended to be 12 volumes and he continued to undertake other work for the Royal Society. However rising costs, estimated by Pitt at £1000 per volume, contributed to his eventual bankruptcy and only four volumes were ever produced. The second volume had as frontispiece a noted engraved portrait of Queen Catherine of Braganza, by Edward Le Davis.

In Ireland William Molyneux collaborated with Roderic O'Flaherty to collect material for the Atlas. While Pitt's financial crisis lead to cancellation of the project, much valuable work on early Irish history was collected and are now freely available on the Virtual Record Treasury of Ireland. O'Flaherty insisted that a crocodile lived in Lough Mask but his work is more remembered for his topographical account of Connaught. Molyneux and O'Flaherty struck a friendship and Molyneux assisted when the latter's treatise Ogygia was published in London in 1685.

As a result of the Atlas project, Pitt was declared bankrupt. He was taken to the Fleet Prison, and remained there, or in the King's Bench Prison, for seven years. In 1691, he published The Cry of the Oppressed: Being a True and Tragical Account of the Unparallel'd Sufferings of Multitudes of Poor Imprison'd Debtors In Most of the Gaols in England, a moving appeal on behalf of prisoners for debt across the country.

== See also ==
- Marshalsea
