= Edward Davies =

Edward or Eddie Davies may refer to:

== Authors ==
- Edward Davies (Celtic) (1756–1831), Welsh writer and druidic poet
- Edward J. Davies (born 1947), American historian
- E. Tegla Davies (1880–1967), Welsh writer

== Sports people ==
- Eddie Davies (boxer) (born 1937), Ghanaian Olympic boxer
- Eddie Davies (footballer) (1923–1995), English footballer
- Edward Davies (footballer), Welsh-born footballer who played for Halifax Town in the 1930s

== Politicians ==
- Edward Davies (MP) (died 1590), MP for Cardigan
- Edward Davies (Pennsylvania politician) (1779–1853), United States representative
- Edward William Davies (1855–1904), mayor of Fremantle, Western Australia, 1901
- Edward R. Davies (mayor) (?-?), mayor of Santa Fe, New Mexico, 1918–1920
- Edward Roderick Davies (1915–1992), American industrialist and mayor of Bloomfield Hills, Michigan from the 1940s to the 1960s

== Others ==
- E. Brian Davies (born 1944), British mathematician
- Edward Davies (RAF officer) (1899–1974), RAF commander
- Edward Davies (architect) (1852–1927), South Australian architect
- E. Harold Davies (1867–1947), professor of music
- Edward Davies (minister) (1827–1905), American minister, author and publisher
- Edward Hurst Davies (1855–1927), Welsh quarry manager and owner

== See also ==
- Edward Davis (disambiguation)
- Edwin Davies (1946–2018), British businessman and philanthropist
