= Panther Peak =

Mountain in United States

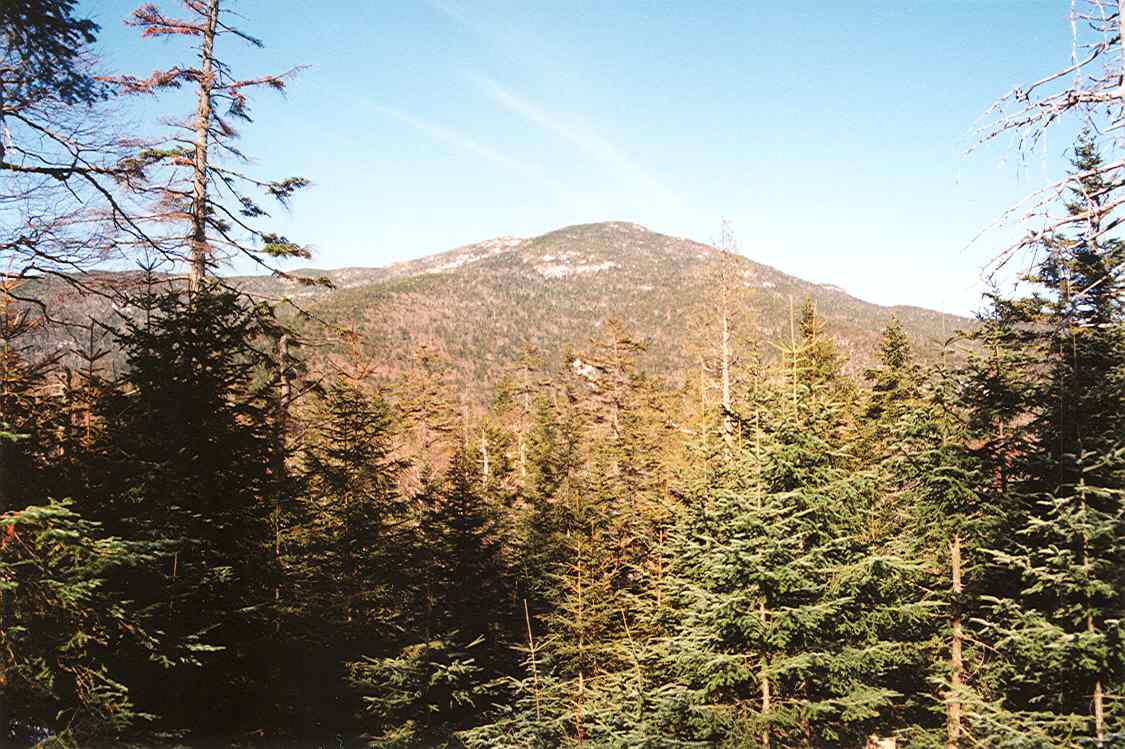
- Panther Peak seen from Bradley Pond leanto

Highest point
- Elevation: 4,442 ft (1,354 m) NGVD 29
- Listing: Adirondack High Peaks 18th
- Coordinates: 44°05′54″N 74°07′56″W

Geography
- Location within New York Adirondack Park Location within the United States
- Location: Newcomb, Essex County, New York
- Parent range: Santanoni Range
- Topo map: USGS Santanoni Peak

Climbing
- First ascent: 1904, by Daniel Lynch
- Easiest route: Hike

Panther Peak is a mountain in the Santanoni Range of the Adirondacks in the U.S. state of New York. It is the 18th-highest of the Adirondack High Peaks, with an elevation of 4,714 feet (1,437 m). It is located in the town of Keene in Essex County, inside Adirondack Park. The mountain is named after the panthers which were once native to the region. The name "Panther Peak" was in use by 1840, but originally referred to a different mountain now known as Mount Henderson. By 1904, the name had been transferred to the present Panther Peak. The earliest recorded ascent was also made in 1904 by surveyor Daniel Lynch. The mountain is flanked by two other High Peaks in the Santanoni Range, Couchsachraga Peak and Santanoni Peak.

== Hiking trails ==
The summit can be reach by hikers on unmarked trails. The Duck Hole via Bradley Pond Trail, which begins at a parking lot in the Upper Works area, passes by the mountains. The unmarked trail to Panther branches off 4.3 miles (6.9 km) north of the trailhead and 0.2 miles (0.32 km) south of the Santanoni lean-to. The trail continues 0.3 miles (0.48 km) west to Panther Brook and follows the brook for 0.5 miles (0.80 km), then proceeds another 0.5 miles (0.80 km) up the side of Panther Peak to an intersection of trails.

The path to the left proceeds to the summits of Santanoni Peak and Couchsachraga. The path to the right goes the final 0.5 miles (0.80 km) to the summit of Panther Peak. Another unmarked trail goes from the Duck Hole via Bradley Pond Trail to the summit of Santanoni, making it possible to hike the entire range in a loop and approach Panther from Santanoni instead.

== See also ==
- List of mountains in New York
- Northeast 111 4,000-footers
- Adirondack High Peaks
- Adirondack Forty-Sixers
