= Edward F. C. Davis =

American engineer (1847–1895)

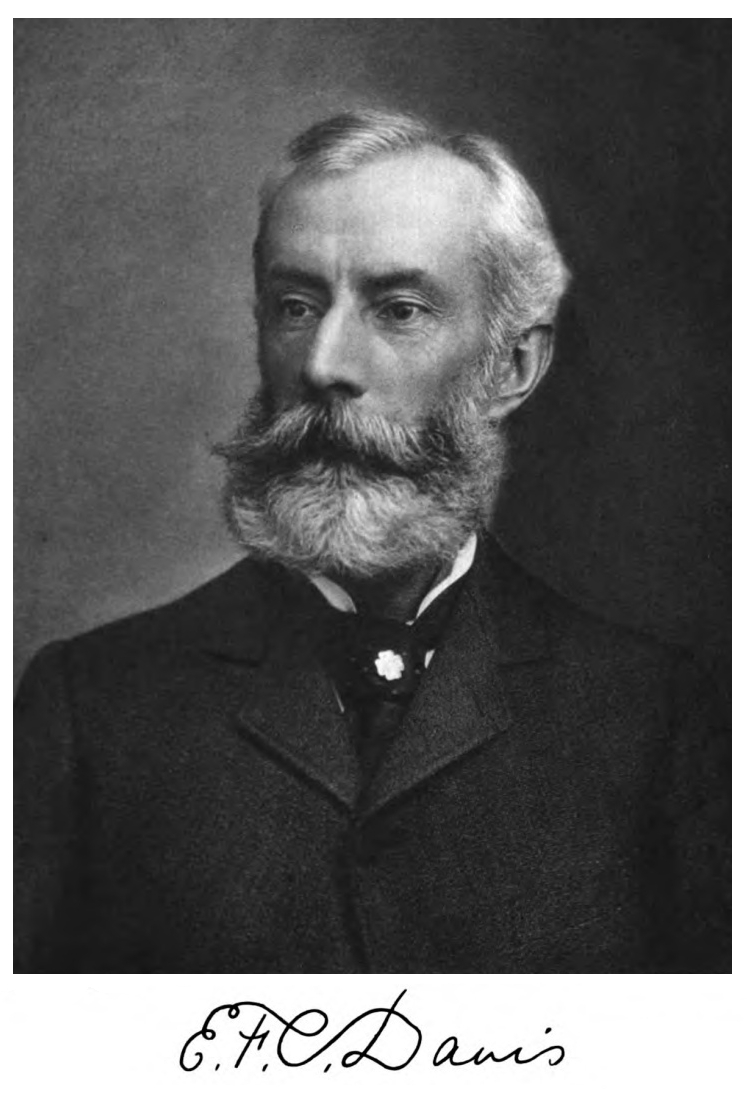
- Born: Edward Forman Chambers Davis; August 13, 1847; Chestertown, Maryland, U.S.
- Died: August 6, 1895 (aged 47); Manhattan, New York City, U.S.
- Resting place: Pottsville, Pennsylvania, U.S.
- Other name: Ezekiel Forman Chambers Davis
- Occupation: Engineer
- Known for: president of the American Society of Mechanical Engineers
- Spouse: Joanna Holland Hobart (m. 1873)
- Children: 6

Edward Forman Chambers Davis (August 13, 1847 – August 6, 1895) was an American mechanical engineer, and superintendent, known as president of the American Society of Mechanical Engineers in the year 1894–95. Davis died while still presiding officer from an accident while riding his horse in the Central Park of New York City.

== Biography ==
=== Youth and education ===
Edward (or Ezekiel) Forman Chambers Davis was born in Chestertown, Maryland, on August 13, 1847, to Laura (née Chambers) and George Linn Lachlin Davis. He received his education and graduated in 1866 at Washington College in his native state. His family connection had been mainly practitioners of law, and he had been expected to follow their example.

But a decided mechanical instinct, evinced in the construction, while a schoolboy, of a small working engine and other appliances, induced a reluctance to the law, and a strong desire to try his fortunes in the shop. After graduating from college, he joined the United States Marines and served on sea for several years. Without much encouragement – from his family, he applied to several establishments, and finally was taken as apprentice in the shops and drawing-room of the Philadelphia Hydraulic Works of Brinton & Henderson.

=== Career ===
Davis then worked for New Castle Machine Works in New Castle, Delaware. He then worked for the Atlantic Dock Iron Works in Brooklyn. Attached with this company, he drew drawings for the Mutual Gas Works of New York City. He moved to Pottsville, Pennsylvania, and worked as a draftsman at Athens Brothers' Rolling Mill (later Pottsville Iron and Steel Company). He was then associated with the Snyder Foundry on Coal Street in Pottsville and then as draftsman and assistant to superintendent S. B. Whiting of the Colliery Iron Works of Pottsville.

In March, 1878, Mr. Davis made an engagement with the Philadelphia & Reading Coal & Iron Company as principal draftsman, and became superintendent around 1880, and had charge of the shops where all the machinery of their extensive collieries was built and repaired. In 1883, his superintendent role extended to the Colliery Iron Works, which joined the company. In 1887, he succeeded Whiting as mechanical engineer. In 1890, Davis moved to Richmond, Virginia, and became general manager of the Richmond Locomotive and Machine Works. He designed a special locomotive with the company. In April 1895, Davis became president of C.W. Hunt Company, an industrial railway builder in Staten Island. He was also connected with the Brighton Iron Works in Staten Island. He was a member of the American Railway Master Mechanics' Association.

== Personal life ==
Davis married Joanna Holland Hobart, daughter of John Potts Hobart, of Pottsville on September 11, 1873. He lived there for a time. They had six children, John Hobart, Mary Clare, George Linn Lachlin, Mary Clare, Cecil Hobart, Joanna Hobart and Meredith "Tim".

In 1895 the American Society of Mechanical Engineers wrote that for "the first time in the fifteen years of the existence of the American Society of Mechanical Engineers that body has been called to deplore the loss of its presiding officer while in active fulfilment of his duties. Mr. E. F. C. Davis, elected president at the annual meeting in December, 1894, was killed suddenly by an accident while riding his horse in the Central Park of New York City on the evening of Tuesday, August 6, 1895."

And furthermore, that the "exact nature of the disaster is not known, as he was riding alone; but the supposition advanced is that the horse became unmanageable from some reason and fell upon his rider. Mr. Davis had long been an expert in all out-door sports, and particularly in horsemanship, which has made his untimely death from this cause so much the more a shock because a surprise and unexplainable. He was found by guardians of the park still living, but passed away without regaining consciousness." He was buried in Pottsville.
