= Richmond Locomotive and Machine Works =

- U.S. National Register of Historic Places
- Virginia Landmarks Register
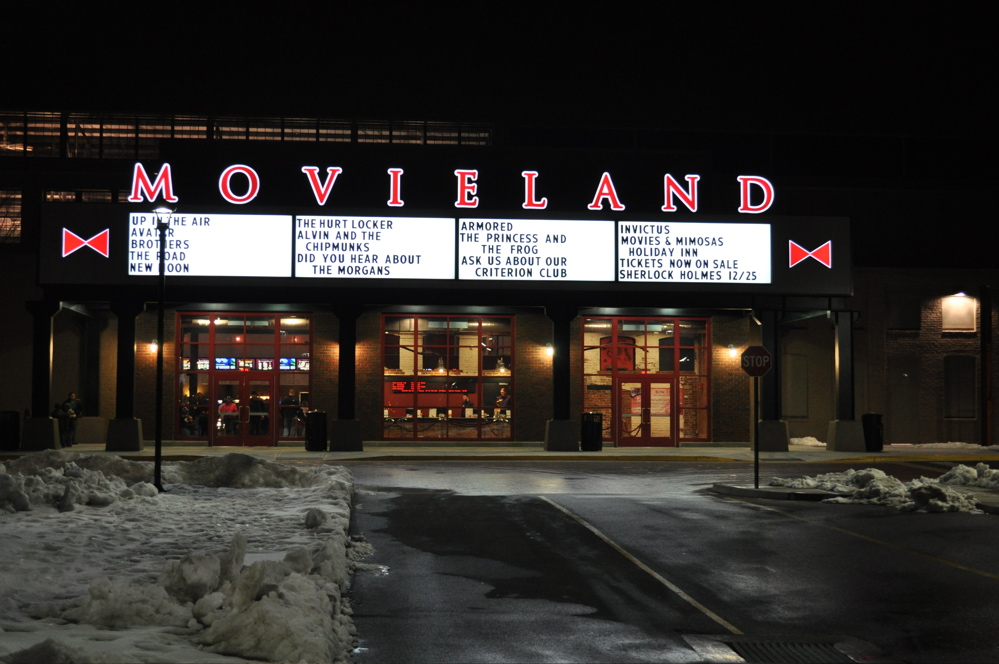
- The former Richmond Locomotive and Machine Works, December 2009

- Location within Virginia Location within the United States
- Location: 1331 North Blvd., Richmond, Virginia
- Coordinates: 37°34′03″N 77°28′03″W
- Area: 4.1 acres (1.7 ha)
- Built: 1887, 1917, 1922
- Architectural style: Classical Revival
- NRHP reference No.: 07000363
- VLR No.: 127-6188

Significant dates
- Added to NRHP: April 27, 2007
- Designated VLR: March 7, 2007

Richmond Locomotive and Machine Works, also known as the American Locomotive Company, Richmond Works, consists of two historic buildings located in Richmond, Virginia. They are an Iron Foundry, in use by 1887 and expanded in 1917, and a Brass Foundry, constructed in 1922. Both structures are steel framed, and clad in brick. The Iron Foundry building is approximately 100 feet wide by 480 feet long. The Brass Foundry building measures approximately 160 feet by 50 feet. The Richmond Locomotive & Machine Works grew out of Tredegar Iron Works to become a nationally known manufacturer of steam locomotive engines and an integral part of the industrial landscape of the Three Corners District in Richmond.

The company stopped producing locomotives in Richmond in 1927. The site remained in use until late 2006, most recently as a specialty steel fabrication plant. It was subsequently rehabilitated and occupied by Bow Tie Cinemas for their Movieland at Boulevard Square development.

It was added to the National Register of Historic Places in 2007.
