= Edward Thomson Davis =

English painter

- Born: 1833; Northwick, Worcestershire, England
- Died: 12 June 1867; Rome
- Occupation: Painter

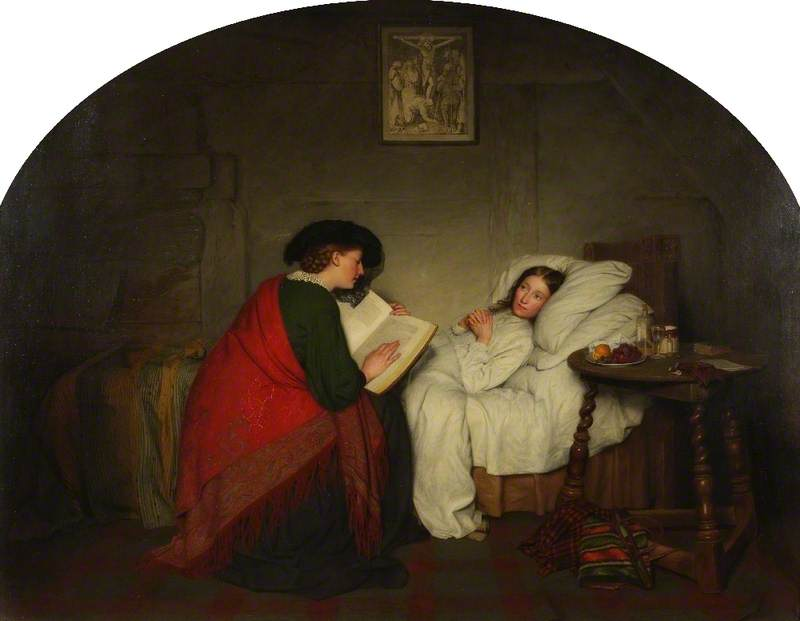
Words of Comfort

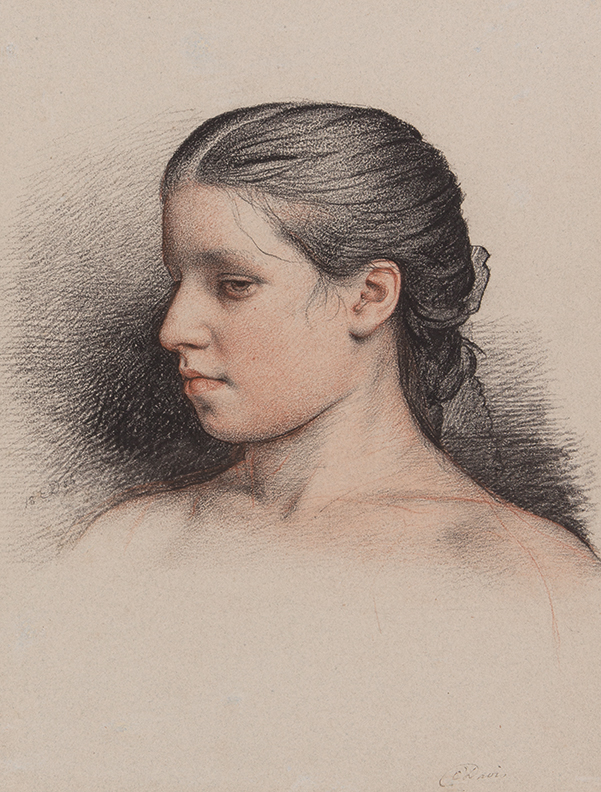
‘Miss Pugh’ of Wheathill (1856)

Edward Thomson Davis (1833 – 12 June 1867) was a British genre painter, active in Worcester, England.

== Biography ==
Davis was born at Northwick, near Worcester, and studied at Birmingham School of Design and then at Worcester School of Design, and worked collaboratively with his fellow student at the latter, Benjamin Williams Leader, on at least one painting, A View of Frog Lane (1854).

He exhibited twenty works at the Royal Academy, starting in 1854. His drawing, Studies of a Child and Two Women, is in the collection of The Tate Gallery. Other works are in Wolverhampton Art Gallery, Shipley Art Gallery, Worcester City Museum and the Ashmolean Museum. In 1951 an album of his drawings was sold by Christie's.

In 1854, his address was 22 Foregate Street, Worcester; during a "short stay" in London in 1856 he gave his address as 16 Russell Place, Fitzroy Square. In or after 1859, he was again living in Northwick.

Davis visited the Netherlands, and travelled to Rome in 1866. He died there on 12 June 1867, during a cholera outbreak, at the age of just 34.
