= T. Edward Davis =

American sports coach (1898–1970)

Biographical details
- Born: October 29, 1898; Lost Creek, West Virginia, U.S.
- Died: June 1970 (aged 71); Massachusetts, U.S.

Playing career

Football
- 1919–1922: Salem

Coaching career (HC unless noted)

Football
- 1928–1940: Salem

Basketball
- 1926–1941: Salem

Baseball
- 1930–1941: Salem

Administrative career (AD unless noted)
- 1930–1941: Salem

Head coaching record
- Overall: 31–54–7 (football)

Theodore Edward Davis (October 29, 1898 – June 1970) was an American football, basketball, and baseball coach. He served as the head football coach at Salem University in Salem, West Virginia from 1930 to 1940, where he was also instrumental in founding the West Virginia Intercollegiate Athletic Conference. The gymnasium at Salem is named in his honor.

Davis died in Massachusetts in June 1970, at the age of 71.

== Head coaching record ==
=== Football ===
Year	Team	Overall	Conference	Standing	Bowl/playoffs
Salem Tigers (West Virginia Athletic Conference / West Virginia Intercollegiate Athletic Conference) (1930–1940)
1930	Salem	2–6–1	1–5–1	9th	
1931	Salem	2–6	2–3	4th	
1932	Salem	2–5	1–5	6th	
1933	Salem	7–1	7–1	2nd	
1934	Salem	4–5	4–3	4th	
1935	Salem	6–2	6–1	2nd	
1936	Salem	3–4–1	3–3–1	5th	
1937	Salem	0–6–2	0–5–2	7th	
1938	Salem	2–5–1	2–4–1	5th	
1939	Salem	1–6–2	1–5–2	8th	
1940	Salem	2–8	1–6	10th	
Salem:		31–54–7	28–41–7		
Total:		31–54–7			
