= Edward S. Davis =

American politician

Edward Swain Davis
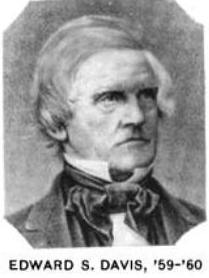

8th Mayor of Lynn, Massachusetts
- In office January 3, 1859 – January 7, 1861
- Preceded by: William F. Johnson
- Succeeded by: Hiram N. Breed

Personal details
- Born: June 22, 1808 Lynn, Massachusetts
- Died: August 7, 1887 (aged 79) Lynn, Massachusetts
- Spouse: Elvira Newhall
- Parent(s): Hugh Davis and Elizabeth (Bachelder) Davis
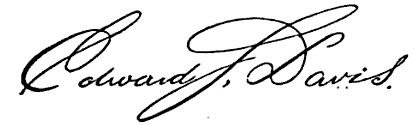
- Signature

Edward Swain Davis (June 22, 1808 – August 7, 1887) was a Massachusetts politician who served as the eighth Mayor of Lynn, Massachusetts.

== Notes ==
Political offices
Preceded by William F. Johnson	Mayor of Lynn, Massachusetts; January 3, 1859 to January 7, 1861	Succeeded by Hiram N. Breed
