= Friedrich Wilhelm Heine =

German painter (1845–1921)

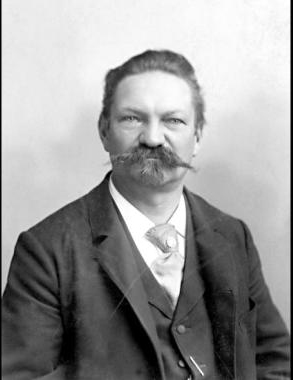
- Born: March 25, 1845; Leipzig, Germany
- Died: August 27, 1921 (aged 76); Milwaukee, Wisconsin
- Occupation: Artist
- Style: Watercolor, etching

Friedrich Wilhelm Heine (March 25, 1845 – August 27, 1921) was a German-born painter known for his genre works and paintings depicting Norse mythology. He was born in Leipzig, Germany, and died in Milwaukee, Wisconsin.

== Life ==
Friedrich Wilhelm Heine spent the first forty years of his life in Germany. At the age of fourteen, he apprenticed in copper and steel engraving. Later in life, he attended the Leipzig and Weimar Academies in Germany, working as a book illustrator and designer from 1861 to 1866.

He was a war correspondent and sketch artist with the Prussian Army in Austria and a field artist in the Franco-Prussian War of 1871. Because of his reputation as a war artist in Germany, Heine was invited to Milwaukee in 1885 to supervise the compositions of the paintings of the American Panorama Company at 628 Wells Street. He was one of about twenty German artists commissioned to paint Storming of Missionary Ridge / Battle of Chattanooga and Battle of Atlanta.

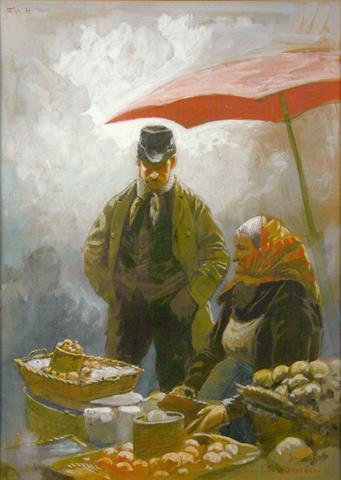
"Altmarkt Dresden" in the Museum of Wisconsin Art Collection

In 1887, Heine and August Lohr purchased the Wells Street studio from the American Panorama Company and formed the Lohr and Heine panorama company. Subsequently, they created the panorama Jerusalem on the Day of the Crucifixion. In 1888 Lohr, Heine, Imre Boos and Paul Zabel formed the Milwaukee Panorama Co and produced Christ’s Triumphal Entry into Jerusalem. At least eight panorama paintings were produced at the Wells Street studio.

In 1888, he opened the Heine School of Art, a watercolor and etching studio that featured costumed models for the students. The school was located in Milwaukee's Iron Block Building, a favorite spot of local artists. After the Spanish–American War (1895–1898), Heine, Lohr, Peter, Rohrbeck and Biberstein went to San Francisco in 1898 to paint the panorama Battle of Manila Bay.

In 1900, he and another artist, George Peter, went to Jerusalem to sketch church interiors for a series of murals to be shown at the 1904 World’s Fair, St. Louis Exposition.

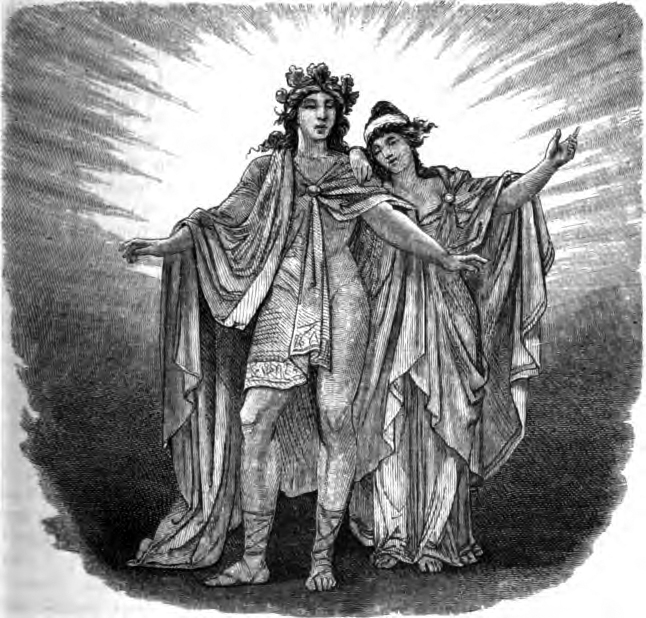
Balder und Nanna by F. W. Heine

Throughout 1908 Heine traveled to Door County, Wisconsin and Muir Woods California, and many watercolor paintings were the result of these trips. Heine was one of the founding members of the Society of Milwaukee Artists, now known as Wisconsin Painters and Sculptors. His early works demonstrated a well-defined brush stroke and a meticulous concern for detail. His later works involved a broader and less defined form and tonalist qualities.
