= Salem University =

For-profit university in Salem, West Virginia, US

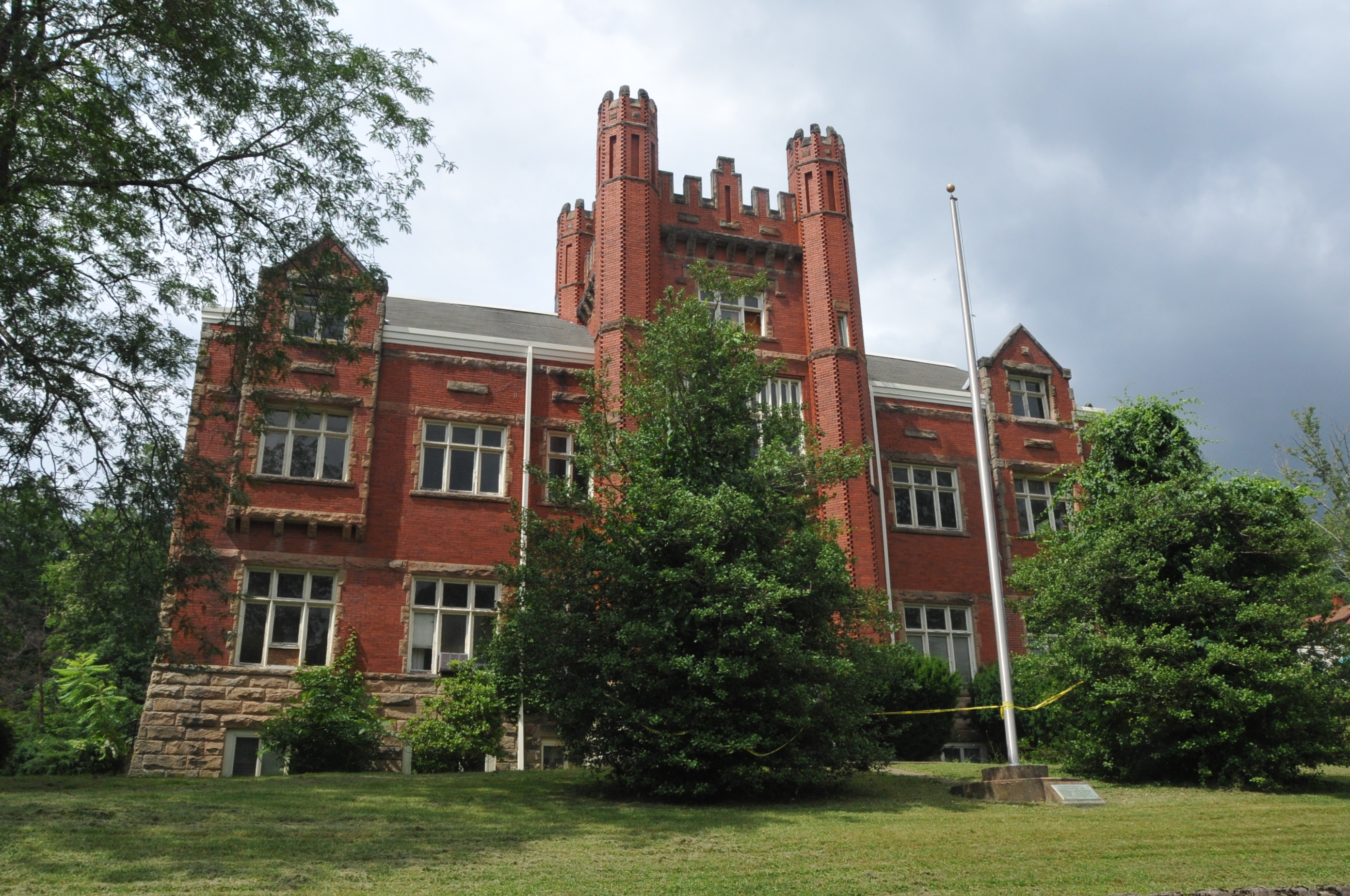
- The Administration Building in 2007
- Former names: Salem College (1888–1989); Salem-Teikyo University (1989–2000); Salem International University (2000–2017)
- Motto: Dirigo
- Type: Private for-profit university
- Established: 1888; 138 years ago
- President: Paul Weber
- Provost: Dr. Jennifer Erpelding
- Students: 835
- Location: Salem, West Virginia, United States; 39°16′58″N 80°33′29″W
- Campus: Town, 100 acres (0.4 km^{2})
- Colors: Green and white
- Sporting affiliations: NCAA Division II - (independent); CWPA
- Mascot: Tiger
- Website: salemu.edu

Salem University is a private for-profit university in Salem, West Virginia, United States. It has about 250 students on campus and about 600 online students enrolled in undergraduate and graduate programs. The university was founded by the Seventh Day Baptist Church in 1888.

== History ==
The school was founded after the Eastern Seventh Day Baptist Association decided to build an academy in Salem. The state granted a permit in December 1888 to build what was called the Academy of Salem, specifying that the institution was subject to the regulations and decisions of the Society of Seventh Day Baptist Education. The charter required the institution to make a college as soon as possible, which occurred in 1890.

Through most of the 20th century, the school continued as a liberal arts, teacher education, and nursing college; Salem maintained affiliation with the Seventh Day Baptists, although remaining non-sectarian in teaching and administration Salem experienced a large expansion during the 1960s coinciding with the Baby Boom generation entering college age. Salem established a short-lived campus in Clarksburg, West Virginia, centered in the former Waldo Hotel, and began construction of new dormitories and academic buildings in Salem, including the "Valley of Learning."

In 1989, Salem formed an alliance with Teikyo University in Tokyo, Japan, which changed the focus of the school to one of education of international students. "Salem College" was renamed "Salem-Teikyo University". Nearly 200 freshmen from Japan enrolled in the college as part of an experiment by Japanese educators to teach the 145 boys and 45 girls how to speak fluent English, experience American culture firsthand and to acquire a valuable American college degree. The alliance with Teikyo ended in 2000, when the school was purchased by investors from Singapore. At that time, the school changed its name to "Salem International University". Salem International University was acquired by Salem Education LLC in June 2005. The school was renamed "Salem University" in September 2017.

The Salem College Administration Building was listed on the National Register of Historic Places in 1989. However, due to ongoing safety concerns, the building was demolished in 2023. Historical documents and the original bell from the building were found in that demolition and are now housed in Salem's Benedum Library.

== Campus ==
=== Current ===
- Erickson Alumni Center
- Jennings Randolph House
- Hoffheimer Hall
- Montgomery Hall

==== Valley of Learning ====
- Benedum Learning Resource Center
- Brewster All-Faiths Chapel
- Carlson Hall of Science
- Randolph Campus Center
- T. Edward Davis Building & Gymnasium

==== Athletic facilities ====
- Catalano Stadium (West Main Street, Salem)
- Hope Softball Field (East Salem)
- Mutschelknaus Community Tennis Courts
- Frank Loria Baseball Field and Indoor Center (Nutter Fort)
- The Bridge Athletic Complex (Bridgeport)
- Aquatics Center at Mylan Park (Morgantown)

=== Former ===
- Barker Equestrian Center (Greenbrier Road)
- Equestrian Barn
- Clarksburg Center - Waldo Hotel
- Fort New Salem
- Original Salem College Building (West Main Street)
- Randolph Hall (Chicago Avenue)
- Salem College Administration Building
- Woodland Terrace
  - Birch/Maple/Oak aka "The Cubes" (Chestnut Street & New York Avenue)
- World Citizen Center (West High Street & West Virginia Avenue)

== Academics ==
Salem is accredited by the Higher Learning Commission. The university offers undergraduate degrees including the Associate of Arts, Associate of Science, Bachelor of Arts, and Bachelor of Science. The School of Nursing offers a Bachelor of Science in Nursing (a degree-completion program for registered nurses) and an Associate of Science in Nursing that prepares students to become Registered Nurses.

At the graduate level, Salem offers a Master of Business Administration, a Master of Education, and a Master of Science in Nursing. Teachers may take courses in the School of Education as non-degree students to renew their licenses. A post-master's certificate in educational leadership is offered which leads to advanced licensure and a certificate in Special Education Leadership is also offered.

All programs, including distance education programs, are delivered in a monthly format, allowing students to complete their degrees more quickly than their counterparts at other traditional or online universities. This attracts non-traditional students conscious of time and accessibility.

Since classes are four weeks long, the MBA or M.Ed. can be completed in 12 months or fewer, a bachelor's in 40 months, or an associate's in only 20 months, if a student were to start college studies without any prior college credits.

== Athletics ==
Salem athletics logo

The Salem athletic teams are called the Tigers. The university is a member of the Division II level of the National Collegiate Athletic Association (NCAA), primarily competing as an NCAA D-II Independent for most of its sports since the 2016–17 academic year (which they were a member on a previous stint from 2010–11 to 2012–13); while being an associate member of the Eastern College Athletic Conference (ECAC) for some of its sports. The Tigers previously competed as a member of the Great Midwest Athletic Conference (G-MAC) from 2013–14 to 2015–16; as well as a charter member of the defunct West Virginia Intercollegiate Athletic Conference (WVIAC) from 1924–25 to 2009–10. They have also competed as a dual affiliate with the United States Collegiate Athletic Association (USCAA) since the 2022–23 school year, thus winning national championships in men's basketball (2023), women's basketball (2024), baseball (2025), men's soccer (2025), softball (2026) and women's volleyball (2026)

Salem competes in 14 intercollegiate varsity sports: Men's sports include baseball, basketball, soccer, swimming, tennis, wrestling, water polo; while women's sports basketball, soccer, softball, swimming, volleyball, tennis, and water polo. They also are set to launch a 15th sport, women's rugby in 2026-2027.

=== Conference membership ===
Salem competed as original members of the WVIAC beginning in 1924–25, and remained a member through 2009–10 (including through that conference's transition from NAIA to NCAA Division II in 1995-1996). The WVIAC folded shortly thereafter in 2013. The majority of the former WVIAC joined the Mountain East Conference, which had its first season of competition in 2013.

Salem is one of four West Virginia schools that joined the G-MAC in July 2013. The other three schools were former WVIAC colleagues of Salem that had been cast adrift in the breakup of the WVIAC. Salem left the G-MAC at the end of the 2015–16 season. According to an official statement issued by the G-MAC: “Salem International will be conducting a final year of (G-MAC) affiliation in 2015-2016.

The institution has been exploring alternate Division II conference membership options beginning with the 2016–17 season.” As of the 2023–24 school year, Salem remains an independent NCAA Division II institution with no conference affiliation in most sports, with the exception being men's and women's water polo that compete in the Western Water Polo Association.

In March 2026, Salem was announced as an associate member of the Mountain East conference for men's soccer.

Additionally, Salem University and the Mountain East Conference had maintained various non-conference scheduling agreements for men's and women's basketball, men's and women's soccer, volleyball, baseball, and softball beginning in August 2023 in the wake of the sudden closure of then Mountain East member Alderson Broaddus University. Agreements were renewed in the wake of another MEC member closure, Notre Dame College in the spring of 2024. The scheduling agreement ended with the 2025-2026 school year, but the associate membership status in the MEC for men's soccer, men's wrestling, and both the men's and women's swimming programs is still active going into 2026-2027. The Peach Belt Conference also includes Salem as an associate member for women's volleyball.

In September 2026, Salem announced its athletics programs will return to NAIA competition beginning in the Fall 2027 season, and will request to join the River States Conference, despite opposition of the move from athletes and supporters.

== Notable alumni ==
- John Abramovic, professional basketball player
- Terry Bowden, college football coach
- Mike Carey, college basketball coach
- Adam Curry, television personality, podcast inventor and entrepreneur
- T. Edward Davis, coach of multiple sports and athletic director
- Jack Deloplaine, professional football player
- Larry J. Edgell, member of the West Virginia Senate
- Dave Ewart, professional football coach
- Jimbo Fisher, college football coach
- Scott Hilton, professional football player
- Rush Holt Sr., United States Senator from West Virginia
- Monty Hunter, professional football player
- Dennis Knight, professional wrestler
- Orson Mobley, professional football player
- Matthew M. Neely, politician who served in both houses of the United States Congress and as Governor of West Virginia
- Jennings Randolph, United States Representative (1933–1947) and United States Senator (1958–1985)
- Jess Rodriguez, professional football player
- Rich Rodriguez, college football coach
- Joseph Rosier, United States Senator from West Virginia
- Michael B. Surbaugh, Chief Scout Executive of the Boy Scouts of America
- Archie Talley, professional basketball player
- Cecil Underwood, Governor of West Virginia
