= John Baptist Jaspers =

Flemish painter (d. 1691)

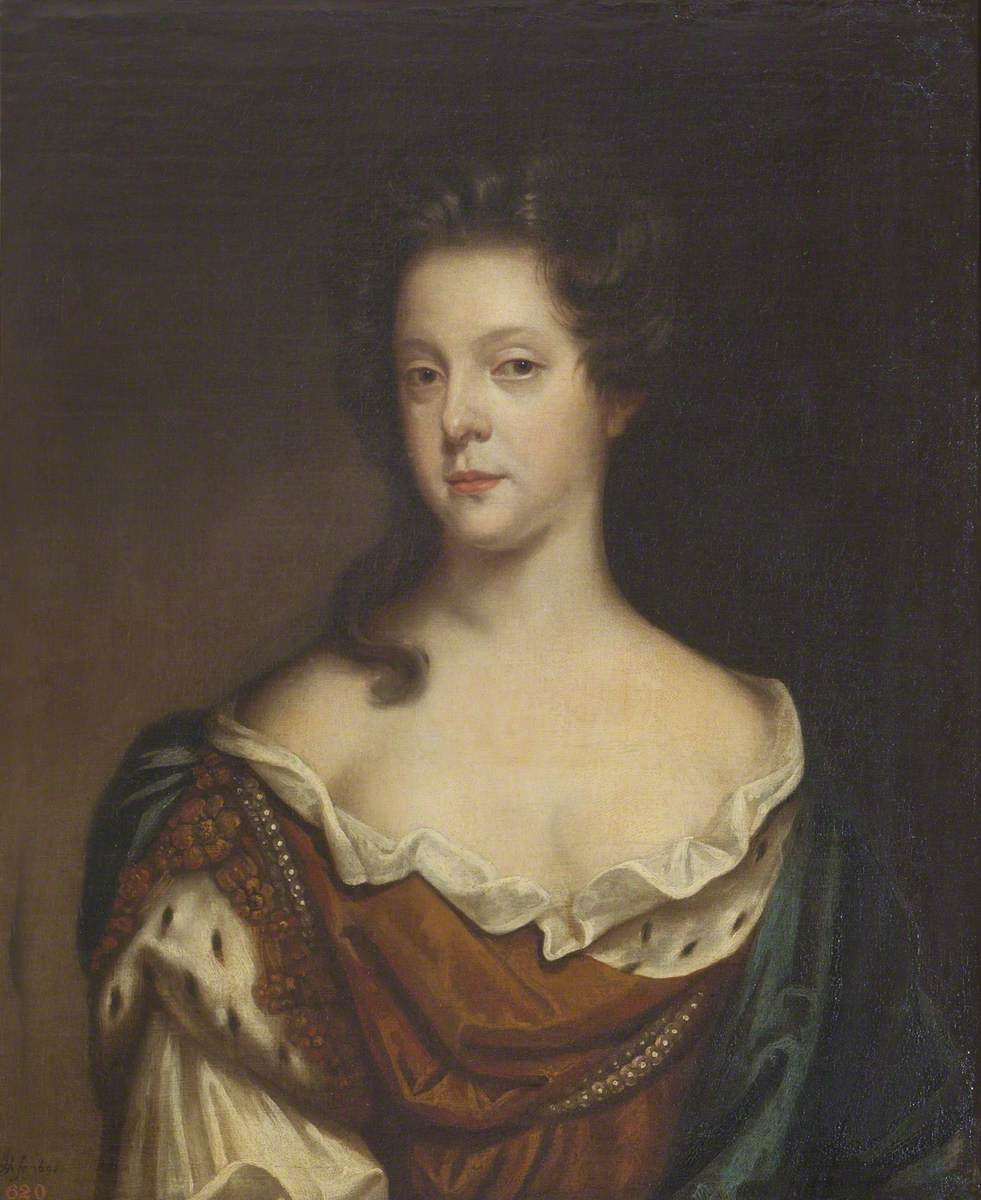
Portrait of an Unknown Young Peeress (inscribed as 'Sarah Jennings, 1660–1744, Duchess of Marlborough')

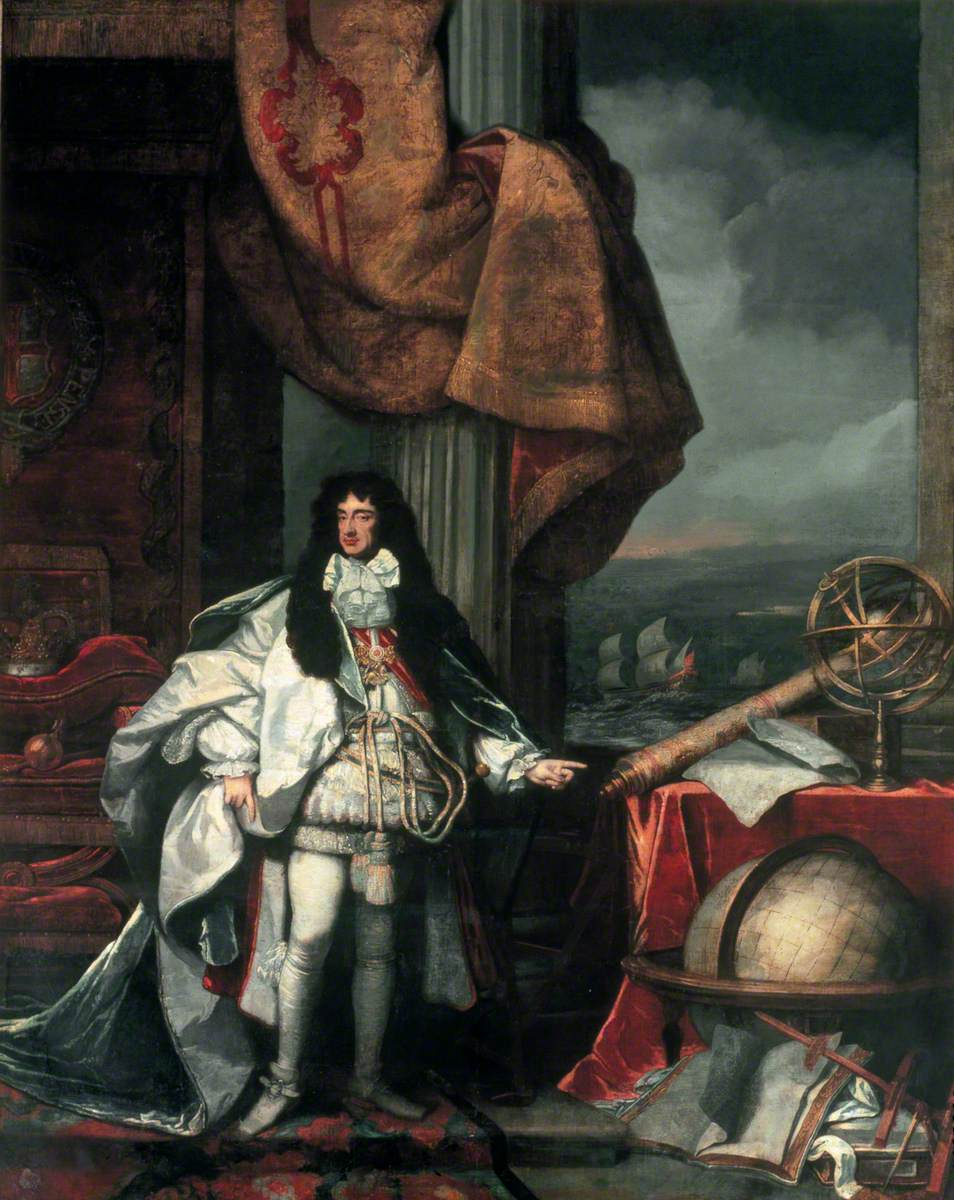
Charles II as President of the Royal Society

Jan Baptist Jaspers, also John Baptist Gaspars (died 1691), a native of Antwerp, was a scholar of Thomas Willeborts. He visited England during the civil war, and was much employed by General Lambert. After the Restoration he became an assistant to Sir Peter Lely, and afterwards to Sir Godfrey Kneller. He drew well, and excelled in making designs for tapestry. The portrait of Charles II in the hall of the Painter-Stainers' Company, and that of the same king in the hall of St. Bartholomew's Hospital, were painted by him. He died in London in 1691.
