= Jennings Randolph =

American politician (1902–1998)

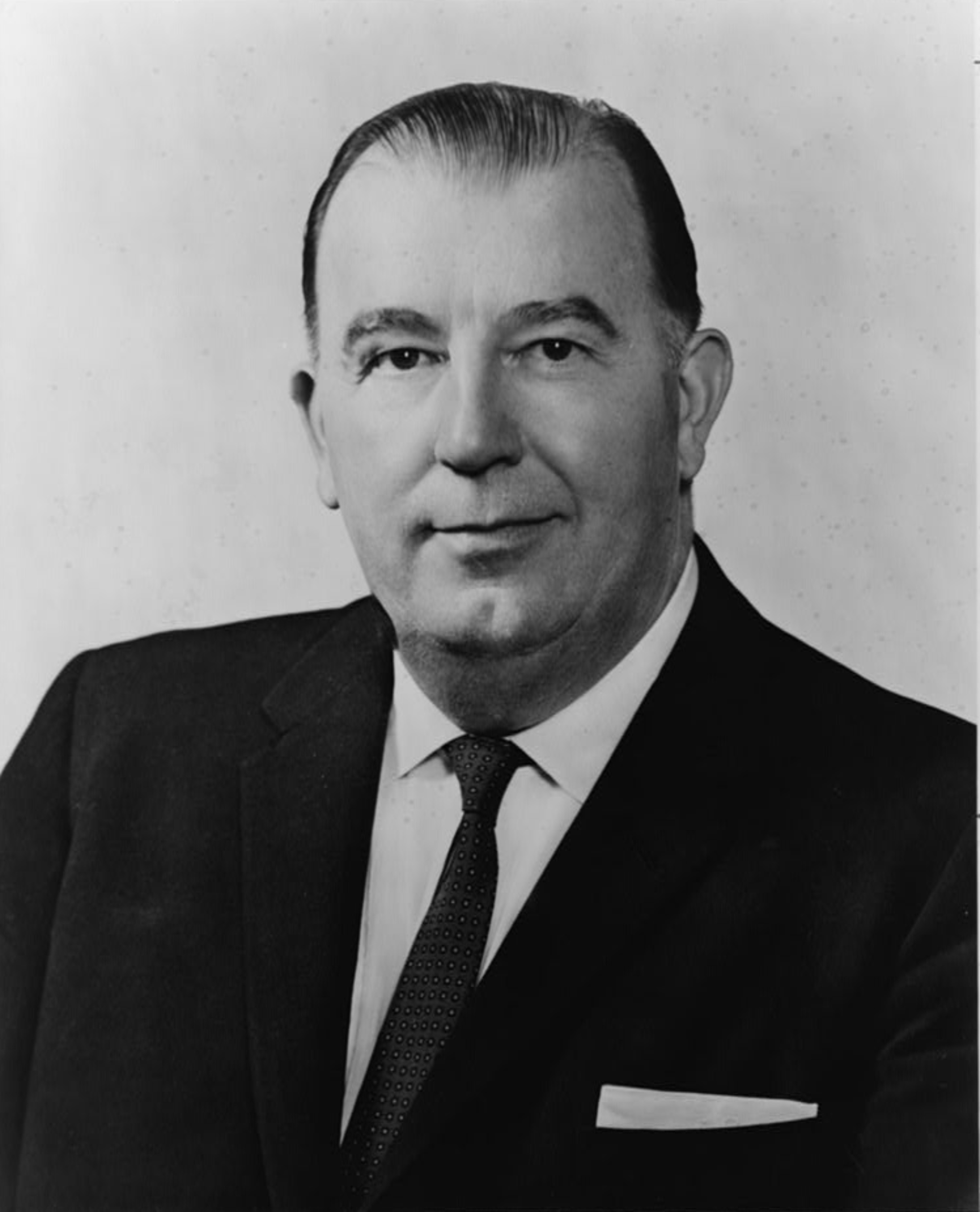
- Official portrait, 1958

United States Senator from West Virginia
- In office November 5, 1958 – January 3, 1985
- Preceded by: John D. Hoblitzell Jr.
- Succeeded by: Jay Rockefeller

Member of the U.S. House of Representatives from West Virginia's 2nd district
- In office March 4, 1933 – January 3, 1947
- Preceded by: Frank L. Bowman
- Succeeded by: Melvin C. Snyder

Personal details
- Born: March 8, 1902 Salem, West Virginia, U.S.
- Died: May 8, 1998 (aged 96) St. Louis, Missouri, U.S.
- Party: Democratic
- Spouse: Mary Katherine Babb (m. 1933; died 1981)
- Education: Salem College

Jennings Randolph (March 8, 1902 – May 8, 1998) was an American politician from West Virginia. A Democrat, he was most notable for his service in the United States House of Representatives from 1933 to 1947 and the United States Senate from 1958 to 1985. He was the last living member of the United States Congress to have served during the first 100 days of Franklin D. Roosevelt's administration. Randolph retired in 1985, and was succeeded by Jay Rockefeller.

== Early life and career ==
Randolph was born in Salem, West Virginia, the son of Idell (Bingham) and Ernest Fitz Randolph. He was named after William Jennings Bryan. Both his grandfather and father had been mayors of Salem.

He attended the public schools and graduated from the Salem Academy in 1920 and Salem College in 1922. In 1924 he engaged in newspaper work in Clarksburg, West Virginia. He was the associate editor of the West Virginia Review at Charleston, West Virginia in 1925; head of the department of public speaking and journalism at Davis and Elkins College at Elkins, West Virginia, 1926–1932; and a trustee of Salem College and Davis and Elkins College.

In 1930, Randolph lost a bid for election to the U.S. House of Representatives, but he won the seat in 1932 and was re-elected six times, serving from March 4, 1933, to January 3, 1947. While a congressman, he was chairman of the U.S. House Committee on the District of Columbia (Seventy-sixth through Seventy-ninth Congresses) and the U.S. House Committee on Civil Service (Seventy-ninth Congress).

Randolph was defeated for re-election in the Republican landslide of 1946. He had a longtime association with Southeastern University in Washington, D.C., serving as a professor of public speaking there from 1935–1953, and dean of the School of Business Administration from 1952 to 1958. In February 1947 he became assistant to the president and director of public relations at Capital Airlines (later purchased by United Airlines) in Washington, giving up those positions in April 1958 to focus on his campaign for the U.S. Senate.

== U.S. Senate ==
Randolph was elected in a special election on November 4, 1958 to the U.S. Senate to fill the vacancy caused by the death of Matthew M. Neely. He was re-elected to a full term in 1960, re-elected in 1966, 1972 and 1978, and served from November 5, 1958 to January 3, 1985. Randolph was chairman of the Committee on Public Works (89th through 95th Congresses) and its successor, the Committee on Environment and Public Works (95th and 96th Congresses). He was not a candidate for reelection in 1984.

== Legislation ==
Randolph voted in favor of the Civil Rights Acts of 1960, 1964, and 1968, as well as the 24th Amendment to the U.S. Constitution, the Voting Rights Act of 1965, and the confirmation of Thurgood Marshall to the U.S. Supreme Court. On November 4, 1977, President Jimmy Carter signed environmental bills H.R. 2817 and H.R. 4297, singling Randolph out as the sole senator he wanted to thank for their passage.

=== Twenty-Sixth Amendment to the United States Constitution ===
Randolph was best known for sponsoring eleven times an amendment to the Constitution that would grant citizens aged between 18 and 21 the right to vote. He first introduced the amendment in 1942, arguing that young soldiers fighting in World War II should be able to vote. In 1970 amendments to the Voting Rights Act lowered the voting age to 18 in both local and national elections. After the Supreme Court found in Oregon v. Mitchell that Congress only had the power to lower the voting age to 18 for national elections, and no power to lower it for state elections, Randolph was among the senators who re-introduced the amendment. It was ratified by three-fourths of the states in 1971 as the Twenty-sixth Amendment, 107 days after it was approved by Congress.

Following a request from President Richard Nixon, on February 11, 1972 Jennings personally escorted Ella Mae Thompson Haddix to Randolph County Courthouse in Elkins, West Virginia to register to vote, becoming the first 18-year-old registered voter in the United States.

=== Equal Rights Amendment ===
On August 26, 1970, the fiftieth anniversary of the ratification of the Nineteenth Amendment to the United States Constitution giving women the right to vote, Randolph attracted widespread media coverage for negative comments he made concerning the Women's Liberation Movement. Feminists had organized a nationwide Women's Strike for Equality that day, and presented the sympathetic Senate leadership with a petition for the Equal Rights Amendment. Randolph derided the protesters as "braless bubbleheads" and claimed that the equal rights activists did not speak for women, citing those more radical feminists that supported, as he put it, the "right to unabridged abortions". Randolph would later admit that his "bubbleheads" comment was "perhaps ill-chosen" and went on to support the Equal Rights Amendment. In 1972, when the amendment passed the Senate, Randolph was a co-sponsor.

=== Randolph–Sheppard Act ===
While a member of the House of Representatives, Randolph was the main sponsor of the Randolph–Sheppard Act, which was passed by Congress in 1936. This act, which is still in force, gives blind people preference in federal contracts for food service stands on federal properties such as military bases, as well as some other jobs. Organizations for blind people such as the National Federation of the Blind cite this act as one of the first and most successful programs to give blind people secure jobs with less supervision and more independence than other previous programs such as sheltered workshops. This act became one of the first instances of affirmative action legislation.

=== Aeronautics legislation ===
An aviation enthusiast, he often flew more than once a day to visit constituents in West Virginia and to commute to Washington. He was the founder and first president of the Congressional Flying Club. He was a strong advocate for programs to advance air travel and airport development. In 1938 he sponsored the Civil Aeronautics Act, which transferred the federal civil aviation responsibilities from the Department of Commerce to a new independent agency, the Civil Aeronautics Authority (CAA). The legislation gave the CAA the power to regulate airline fares and to determine the routes that air carriers would serve. In subsequent years, Randolph co-authored the Federal Airport Act as well as legislation that created the Civil Air Patrol, the National Air and Space Museum, and National Aviation Day. During his tenure in the Senate, he sponsored the Airport-Airways Development Act that created the Airport Trust Fund. As a co-author of the Appalachian Regional Development Act, he included provisions for the development of rural airports.

=== Synthetic Liquid Fuels Act ===
In 1942 Randolph proposed a Synthetic Liquid Fuels Act, which would fund the transformation of coal and its products into other useful forms of energy. To promote the viability of synthetic fuels, in November 1943 Randolph and a professional pilot flew in an aircraft powered by gasoline derived from coal. The small, single-engine airplane flew from Morgantown, West Virginia to National Airport in Washington, D.C. Aided by Interior Secretary Harold Ickes and Senator Joseph C. O'Mahoney, the Synthetic Liquid Fuels Act was approved on April 5, 1944. The Act authorized $30 million for the construction and operation of demonstration plants to produce synthetic liquid fuels.

=== Department of Peace ===
He introduced legislation to establish a Department of Peace in 1946 with the goal of strengthening America's capacity to resolve and manage international conflicts by both military and nonmilitary means. In the 1970s and 1980s he joined senators Mark Hatfield and Spark Matsunaga and Congressman Dan Glickman in efforts to create a national institution dedicated to peace. After he had announced his retirement from Congress in 1984, Randolph played a key role in the passage and enactment of the United States Institute of Peace Act. To guarantee its passage and funding, the legislation was attached to the Department of Defense Authorization Act of 1985. Approval of the legislation was in part a tribute to Randolph's long career in public service. The Jennings Randolph Program, which awards fellowships to enable outstanding scholars, policymakers, journalists, and other professionals from around the world to conduct research at the U.S. Institute of Peace, has been named in his honor.

== Life outside Congress ==
Randolph married Mary Katherine Babb on February 18, 1933. She died of cancer on March 10, 1981, and the Mary Babb Randolph Cancer Center at West Virginia University is named for her. They had two sons, Jennings "Jay" Randolph Jr. born in 1934 and Frank Babb Randolph born in 1938.

Their oldest son, Jay Randolph, was a longtime television sportscaster for NBC, and KSDK for Cardinals games in St. Louis. Jay's son and Jennings's grandson, Jay Randolph Jr., followed in his father's footsteps as a sportscaster and was the lead anchor of the PGA Tour Network on XM Satellite Radio, and hosted a sports talk show on St. Louis radio station KFNS before passing in 2022.

Their youngest son, Frank Babb Randolph, is a renowned interior designer in Washington, D.C. Some of his defining work includes redecorating the Vice President's residence for the Cheneys, the Italian Embassy and the D.C. home of Senior CBS News correspondent Norah O'Donnell.

Randolph's early career is recounted in Napoleon Hill's self-help book, Think and Grow Rich. Hill gave the commencement address at Randolph's graduation from Salem College; Randolph was deeply moved and inspired by the address. Later, when Randolph was elected to Congress, he wrote to Hill, urging him to turn the speech into a printed book. The text of this letter appears in the book. Two years after it was published, Randolph himself wrote a book along with James A. Bell called "Mr. Chairman, Ladies and Gentlemen... : A Practical Guide to Public Speaking.

In 1971, Randolph won the Transportation Research Board's George S. Bartlett Award for his "outstanding contribution to highway progress." Randolph was also the de facto chairman of Agri-Energy Roundtable (AER), a nongovernmental organization (NGO) accredited by the United Nations, and led U.S. delegations to seven AER annual conferences in Geneva, Switzerland (1981–1987).

Jennings Randolph Lake, in Mineral County, West Virginia and Garrett County, Maryland, is named in his honor. The Jennings Randolph Bridge that carries U.S. Route 30 across the Ohio River between Chester, West Virginia, and East Liverpool, Ohio, also is named for him. In West Virginia, Interstate 79 is known as the Jennings Randolph Expressway.

== Death ==
Randolph died in St. Louis, Missouri in 1998. He was interred at Seventh Day Baptist Cemetery in Salem, West Virginia.

Party political offices
Preceded by Matthew M. Neely	Democratic nominee for U.S. Senator from West Virginia (Class 2); 1958, 1960, 1966, 1972, 1978	Succeeded by Jay Rockefeller
U.S. House of Representatives
Preceded by Frank L. Bowman	Member of the U.S. House of Representatives from West Virginia's 2nd congressional district March 4, 1933 – January 3, 1947	Succeeded by Melvin C. Snyder
U.S. Senate
Preceded by John D. Hoblitzell, Jr.	U.S. senator (Class 2) from West Virginia; November 5, 1958 – January 3, 1985; Served alongside: W. Chapman Revercomb, Robert C. Byrd	Succeeded by Jay Rockefeller
Political offices
Preceded by Patrick V. McNamara	Chairman of Senate Public Works Committee; 1966–1977	Committee replaced by Environment and Public Works Committee
New title Committee created to replace Public Works Committee	Chairman of Senate Environment and Public Works Committee; 1977–1981	Succeeded by Robert Stafford
Honorary titles
Preceded by Victor Christgau	Most senior living U.S. representative (Sitting or former); October 10, 1991 – May 8, 1998; Served alongside: Robert T. Secrest (until May 15, 1994)	Succeeded by Carl Curtis
Preceded by Margaret Chase Smith	Oldest living United States senator (Sitting or former); May 29, 1995 – May 8, 1998	Succeeded by Strom Thurmond
Preceded by Harry P. Jeffrey	Oldest living United States representative (Sitting or former); January 4, 1997 – May 8, 1998	Succeeded by Ellis Yarnal Berry
