= Edward Le Davis =

Welsh engraver and art dealer

Edward Le Davis (fl. 1671–1691) was a Welsh engraver and art dealer. Born Edward Davis, he spent some time working in France, and later prefixed "Le" to his surname.

== Life ==
Davis was apprenticed to David Loggan, but got on badly with Loggan's wife. He broke his articles of apprenticeship and went to Paris. There he worked as an engraver and was given business by François Chauveau.

In the early 1670s Davis returned to London, where he engaged in picture-dealing, and painted portraits. He is known to have held an auction in 1691, with paintings collected by Antonio Barberini and Sir James Palmer. As a London engraver of the time he has been considered outranked by Loggan, Peter Vanderbank and Robert White. His work was featured, however, in a 2001 exhibition on the female courtiers of Charles II, at the National Portrait Gallery, London

== Works ==
From his Paris period, Davis's prints put out by Chaveau included St. Cecilia after Van Dyck, Ecce Homo after Annibale Carracci, and The Infant Christ holding a cross (1671).

His London engravings included portraits of: Charles II (later altered to William III); Catherine of Braganza after John Baptist Gaspers, the frontispiece to vol. ii. of Moses Pitt's English Atlas, 1681; James, Duke of York; the Prince and Princess of Orange, after Peter Lely; the Duchess of Portsmouth, after Lely; and Charles, Duke of Richmond, after Willem Wissing; also George Monck, Duke of Albemarle, and Bertram Ashburnham, both engraved for the 1679 edition of John Guillim's Heraldry.

== Notes ==
Attribution

This article incorporates text from a publication now in the public domain: Lee, Sidney, ed. (1892). "Le Davis, Edward". Dictionary of National Biography. Vol. 32. London: Smith, Elder & Co.
