= August Lohr =

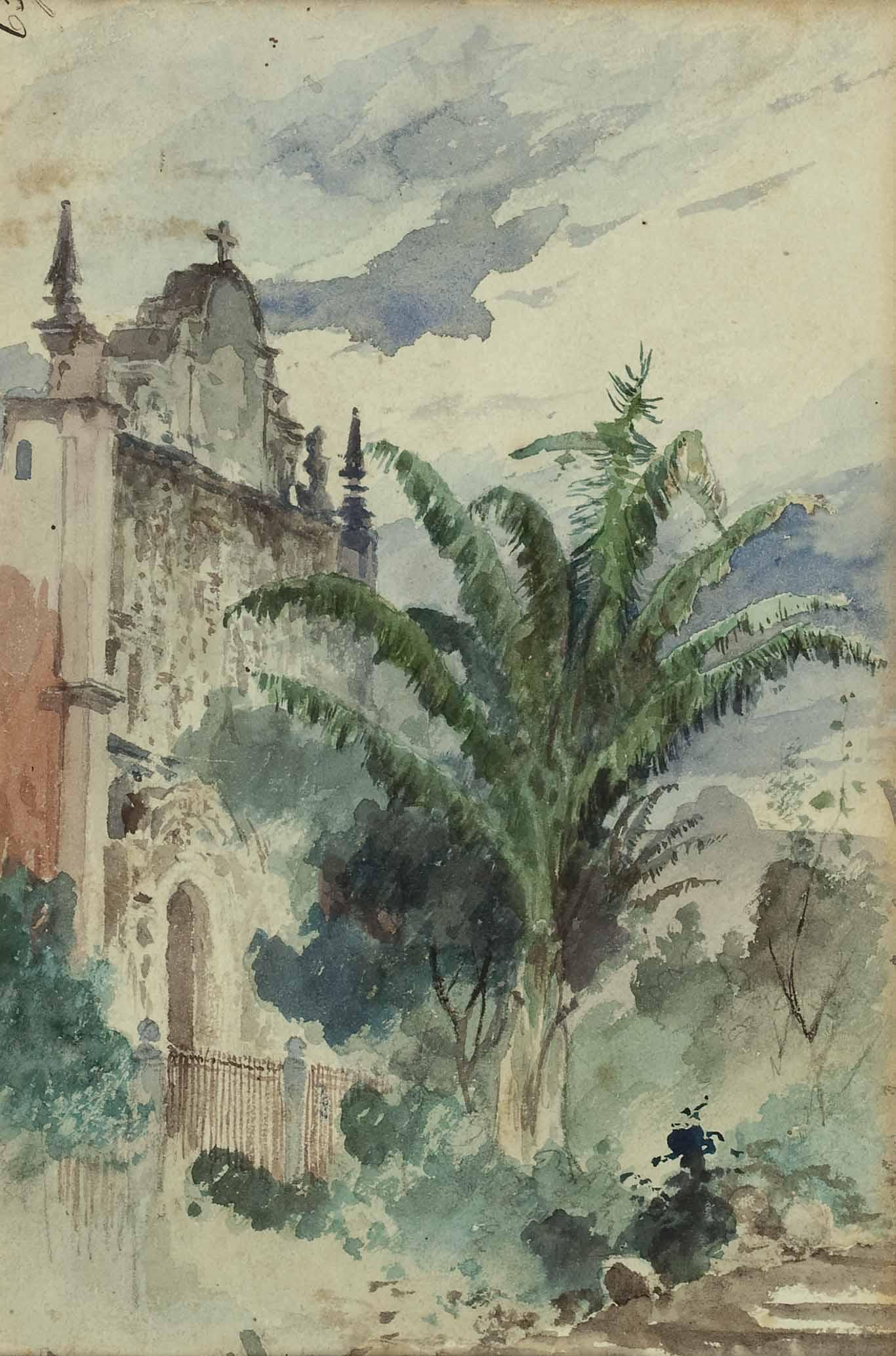

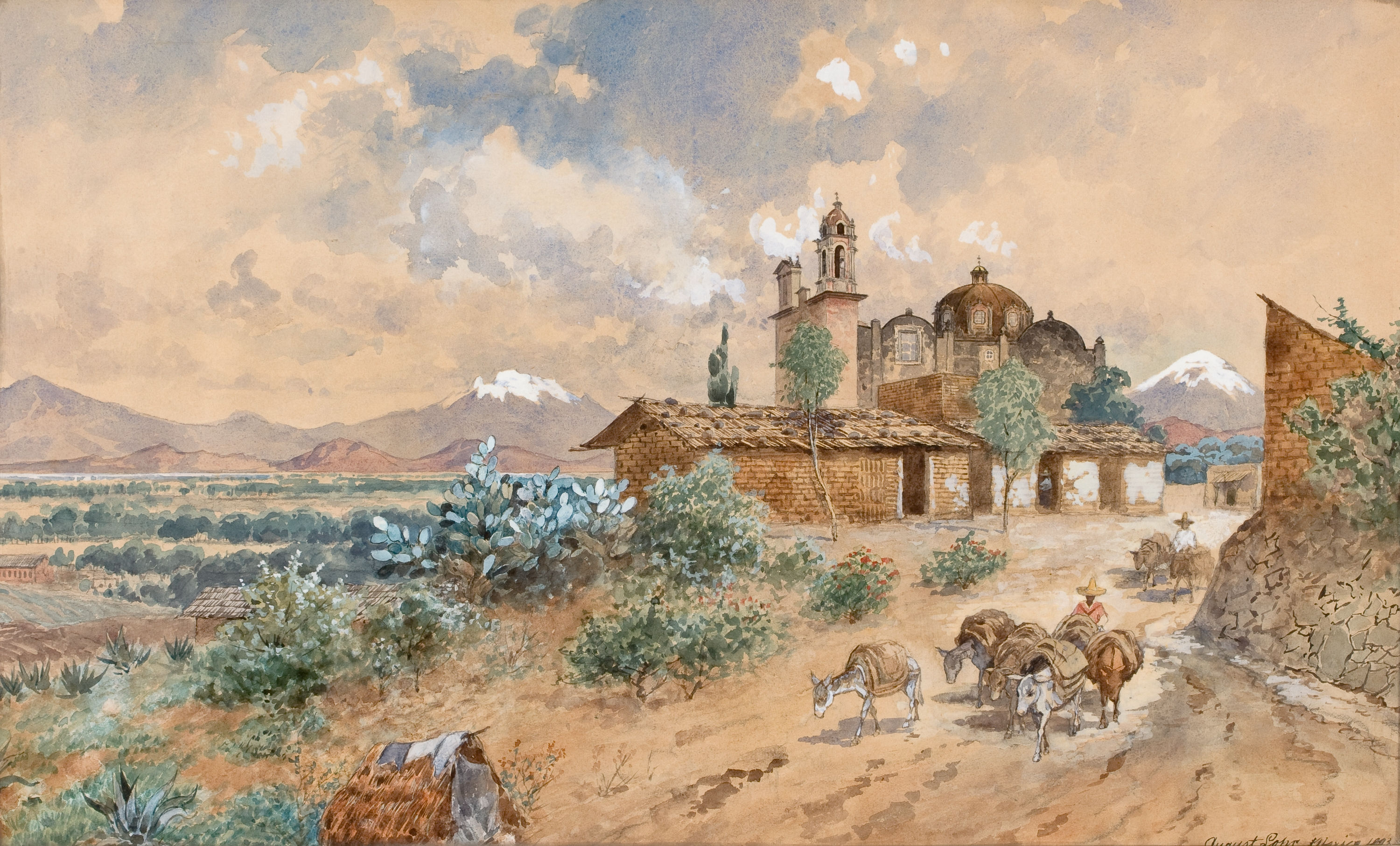

August Lohr (1842–1920) was an artist known for his panorama paintings. Lohr began studying painting on 30 October 1862 at the Academy of Fine Arts, Munich with Carl Theodor von Piloty.

In Munich he worked as a freelance landscape painter. From 1879 to 1881 Lohr helped the Munich art professor Louis Braun in the creation of the panoramic image of the Battle of Sedan and two other battle panoramas.

In April 1885, August Lohr moved to America. He traveled from Germany aboard the steamboat "Fulda" with Hermann Michalowski and Franz Rohrbeck from Berlin as well as Friedrich Wilhelm Heine and Bernhard Schneider from Dresden. In America, Lohr founded together with William Wehner the American Panorama Company with headquarters in Milwaukee. In addition, Lohr oversaw the installation of a German panorama in New Orleans.

From 1887 to 1890 Lohr ran the company Lohr & Heine with Friedrich Wilhelm Heine, which took over the Wells Street Studio from the American Panorama Company.
