= Salem, West Virginia =

City in West Virginia, US

- City
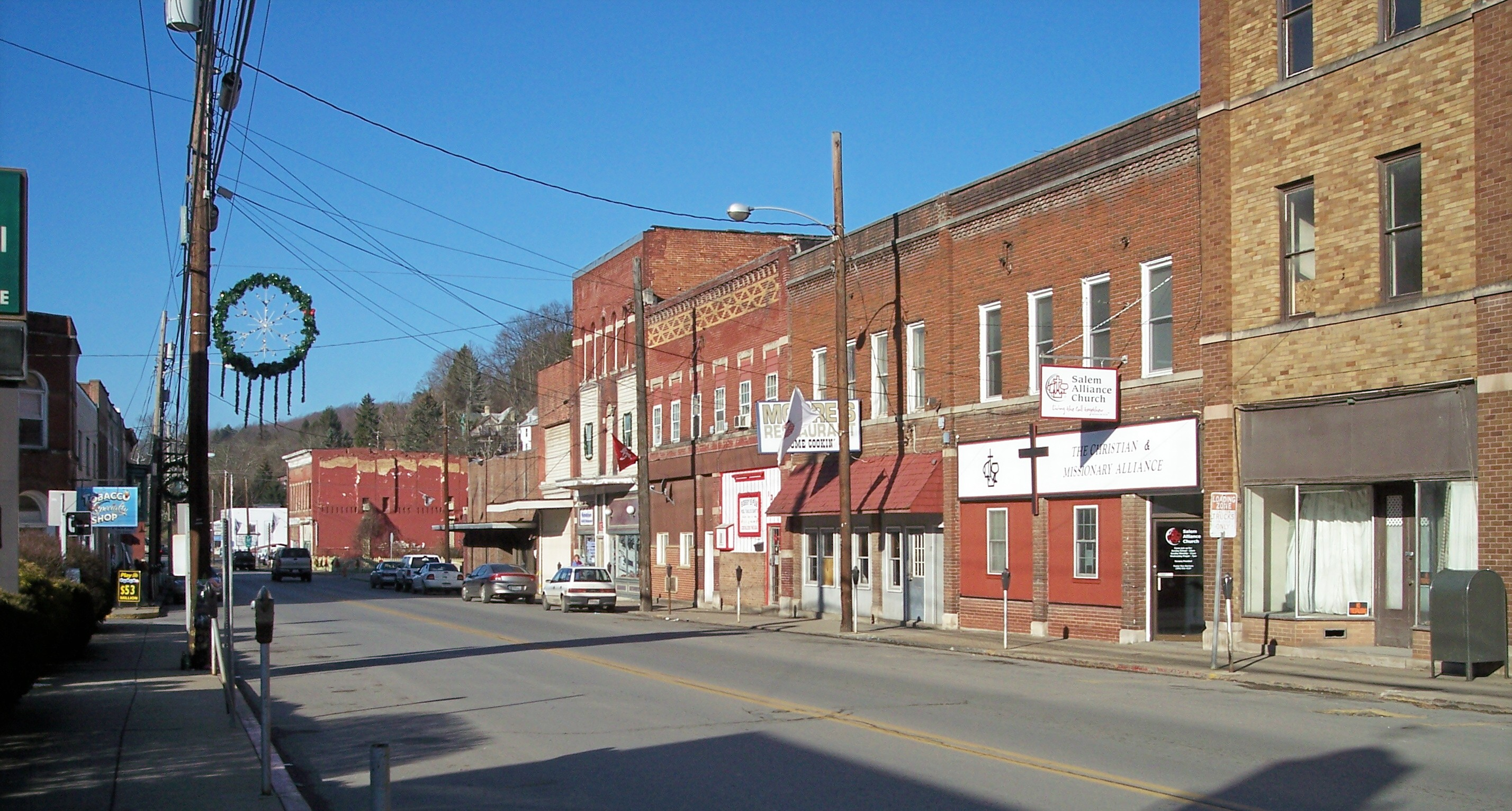
- Main Street in Salem in 2006

- Seal

- Location of Salem in Harrison County, West Virginia (left) and of Harrison County in West Virginia (right)
- Coordinates: 39°17′0″N 80°33′46″W
- Country: United States
- State: West Virginia
- County: Harrison

Area
  - Total: 1.34 sq mi (3.47 km^{2})
  - Land: 1.34 sq mi (3.47 km^{2})
  - Water: 0 sq mi (0.00 km^{2})
- Elevation: 1,050 ft (320 m)

Population (2020)
  - Total: 1,529
  - Estimate (2021): 1,470
  - Density: 1,138/sq mi (439.2/km^{2})
- Time zone: UTC-5 (Eastern (EST))
  - Summer (DST): UTC-4 (EDT)
- ZIP Code: 26426
- Area code: 304
- FIPS code: 54-71380
- GNIS feature ID: 1546280
- Website: salemwestvirginia.com

Salem is a city in Harrison County, West Virginia, United States. The population was 1,485 at the 2020 census. It is located at the junction of U.S. Route 50 and West Virginia Route 23; the North Bend Rail Trail passes through the city. Salem University is located in Salem.

== Geography ==
Salem is located at 39°17′0″N 80°33′46″W (39.283411, -80.562731), along Salem Fork, a tributary of Tenmile Creek, in western Harrison County. According to the U.S. Census Bureau, the city has a total area of 1.34 square miles (3.47 km^{2}), all land.

Salem experienced devastating flooding in 1950, after which the United States Department of Agriculture was authorized by Congress in 1953 to carry out a program of flood prevention and erosion control for Salem Fork.

The project was seven (7) earth dams along with land treatment measures to control flooding and soil erosion.

In 1959, the project was recognized as the most outstanding in the nation and received the “Watershed Project of the Year” award.

== History ==
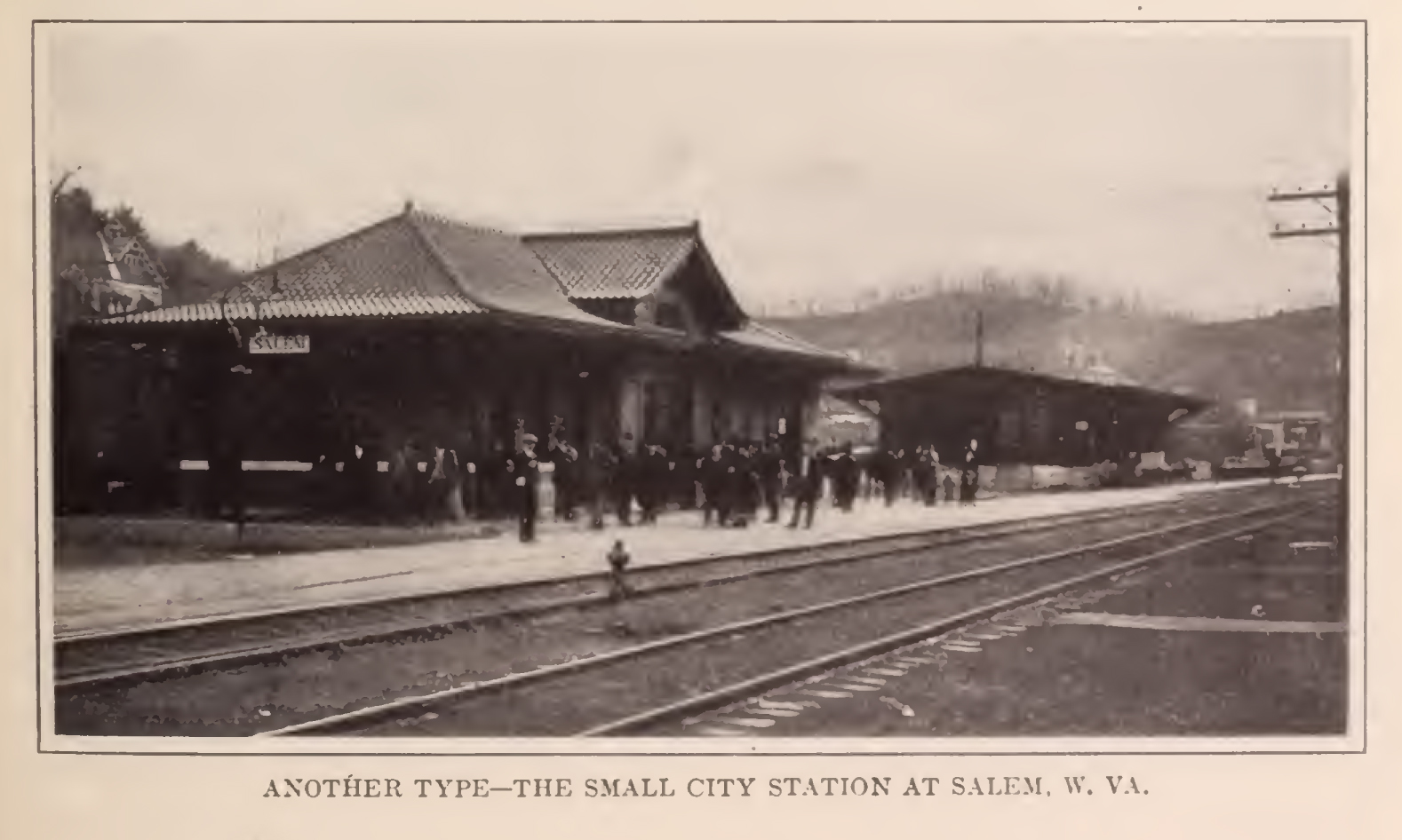
Railroad Station in Salem, c. 1914

Salem was settled in the summer of 1790 — as "New Salem" — by forty Seventh Day Baptist families from Shrewsbury, New Jersey. Notable settler family names included Lippincott, Maxson, Babcock, Plumer, Davis, and Fitz-Randolph. New Salem was formally chartered and made a town by legislative enactment of the Virginia Assembly on December 19, 1794, on land owned by Samuel Fitz Randolph. John Patterson, John Davis, Samuel Lippincott, James Davis, Zebulon Maxon, Benjamin Thorp, Thomas Clayton, William Davis, Jacob Davis, George Jackson and John Haymond were appointed its first trustees.

By the 1870s, the town was more frequently being called "Salem" than "New Salem", as the separation of West Virginia from Virginia in 1863 had diminished the need to distinguish it from the town named Salem near Roanoke. The United States Postal Service made the change official in March 1884. Salem was incorporated by the state of West Virginia on 25 February 1905.

As late as 1870, Charles A. Burdick came to town as a Seventh Day Baptist missionary, feeling the need for an educational institution in the area, opened a school, though it operated for only two semesters. In 1888, the Eastern Seventh Day Baptist Association provided for the construction of the Salem Academy, which later became a college in 1890, existing to this day as Salem University.

Fort New Salem maintains an living history outdoor museum with an 8-acre campus featuring 17 Appalachian 19th Century log structures.

The early 20th century brought discovery of oil and gas deposits in Salem, leading to an industrial boom and the introduction of a glass industry that brought skilled craftsmen immigration from Belgium and other European countries. Industry peaked in the 1920's, however Judel Glass operated the last glass factory in Salem until 2005.

Salem has a rich history of large fires. The same full city block has burned down twice in the city's history. The north side of Main Street downtown burned once in 1901 and again on March 2, 2006. The more recent fire burned the old city bank building, several store fronts, and several residences; five structures in all were damaged. The fire was determined to have been started by a hot water tank in an apartment. The fire departments' ability to put out the blaze was hampered by a limited city water supply; they were forced to draw water from the nearby creek.

The Salem College Administration Building and Salem Historic District are listed on the National Register of Historic Places.

Medium-security Salem Correctional Center, (formerly known as West Virginia Industrial Home for Youth), first opened in 1899, is located on a 61-acre site just west of city limits.

== Demographics ==
Historical population
Census	Pop.	Note	%±
1880	248		—
1890	310		25.0%
1900	746		140.6%
1910	2,169		190.8%
1920	2,920		34.6%
1930	2,943		0.8%
1940	2,571		−12.6%
1950	2,578		0.3%
1960	2,366		−8.2%
1970	2,597		9.8%
1980	2,706		4.2%
1990	2,063		−23.8%
2000	2,006		−2.8%
2010	1,586		−20.9%
2020	1,529		−3.6%
2021 (est.)	1,470		−3.9%
U.S. Decennial Census

=== 2020 census ===
As of the 2020 census, Salem had a population of 1,529. The median age was 34.7 years. 19.6% of residents were under the age of 18 and 15.3% of residents were 65 years of age or older. For every 100 females there were 105.8 males, and for every 100 females age 18 and over there were 104.3 males age 18 and over.

0.0% of residents lived in urban areas, while 100.0% lived in rural areas.

There were 561 households in Salem, of which 29.4% had children under the age of 18 living in them. Of all households, 36.2% were married-couple households, 22.1% were households with a male householder and no spouse or partner present, and 31.9% were households with a female householder and no spouse or partner present. About 32.8% of all households were made up of individuals and 14.6% had someone living alone who was 65 years of age or older.

There were 725 housing units, of which 22.6% were vacant. The homeowner vacancy rate was 6.5% and the rental vacancy rate was 18.1%.

Racial composition as of the 2020 census
Race	Number	Percent
White	1,354	88.6%
Black or African American	71	4.6%
American Indian and Alaska Native	4	0.3%
Asian	8	0.5%
Native Hawaiian and Other Pacific Islander	0	0.0%
Some other race	33	2.2%
Two or more races	59	3.9%
Hispanic or Latino (of any race)	52	3.4%

=== 2010 census ===
As of the census of 2010, there were 1,586 people, 662 households, and 384 families living in the city. The population density was 1,183.6 inhabitants per square mile (457.0/km^{2}). There were 834 housing units at an average density of 622.4 per square mile (240.3/km^{2}). The racial makeup of the city was 93.5% White, 4.1% African American, 0.2% Native American, 0.1% Asian, 0.1% from other races, and 2.0% from two or more races. Hispanic or Latino of any race were 1.1% of the population.

There were 662 households, of which 27.2% had children under the age of 18 living with them, 36.4% were married couples living together, 15.3% had a female householder with no husband present, 6.3% had a male householder with no wife present, and 42.0% were non-families. 35.3% of all households were made up of individuals, and 13.6% had someone living alone who was 65 years of age or older. The average household size was 2.23 and the average family size was 2.88.

The median age in the city was 36.1 years. 20.5% of residents were under the age of 18; 15.8% were between the ages of 18 and 24; 23.1% were from 25 to 44; 26.3% were from 45 to 64; and 14.4% were 65 years of age or older. The gender makeup of the city was 49.1% male and 50.9% female.

== Education ==
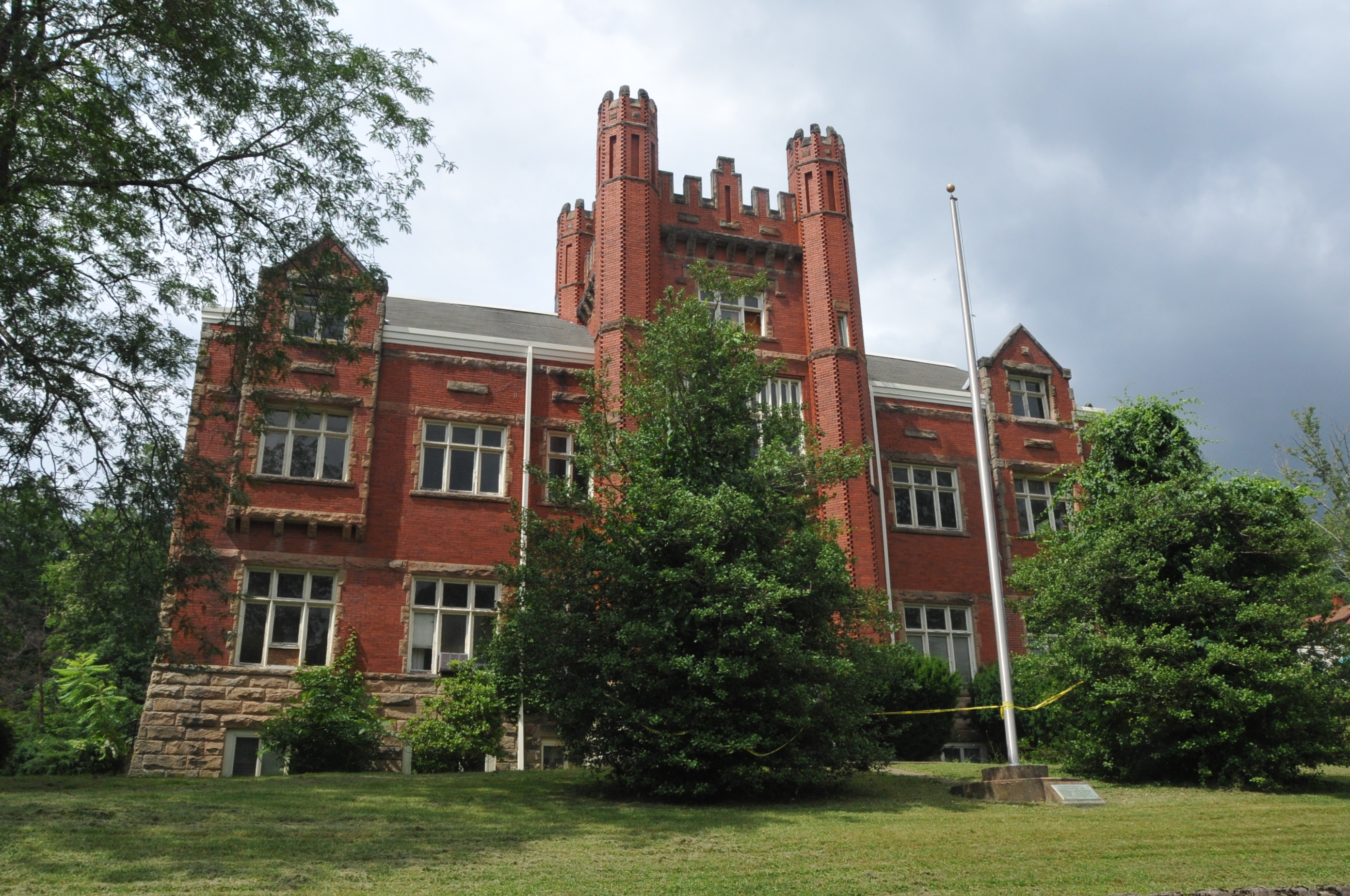
The Salem College Administration Building in 2007

Salem University is a private university in the city, founded in 1888 by Seventh Day Baptists, under the name of Salem College. Since then, it has undergone numerous name changes including Salem-Teikyo University, Salem International University, and now Salem University. The Salem College Administration Building was completed in 1910 and listed on the National Register of Historic Places in 1989.

The Salem College Administration building was later torn down in early 2024 due to it being condemned for many years.

Salem PK-5 students attend Salem Elementary School in the Harrison County Schools district. Grades 6-8 attend Liberty Middle School in Clarksburg and grades 9-12 attend Robert C. Byrd High School, also in Clarksburg.

Former public schools:

- Harden Elementary School, East Main Street, closed in 2007.
- Van Horn Elementary School, West Main Street, closed in 2007.
- Salem High School, East High Street, closed in 1973.
  - Consolidated into Liberty High School

== Notable people ==
- Jennings Randolph: US Senator for West Virginia (1958–1985)
- Melvin Mayfield: US Army soldier and a recipient of the US military's highest decoration — the Medal of Honor — for his actions in World War II
