= 1984 United States Senate elections =

- November 6, 1984
- Class 2

33 of the 100 seats in the United States Senate 51 seats needed for a majority
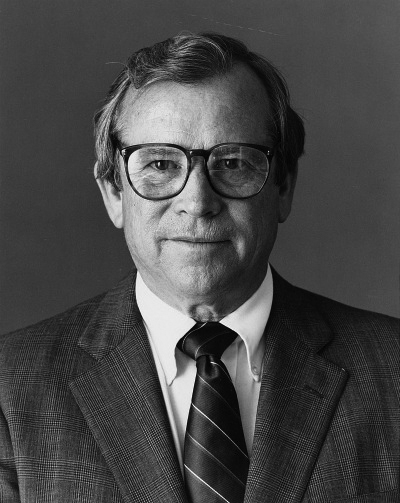

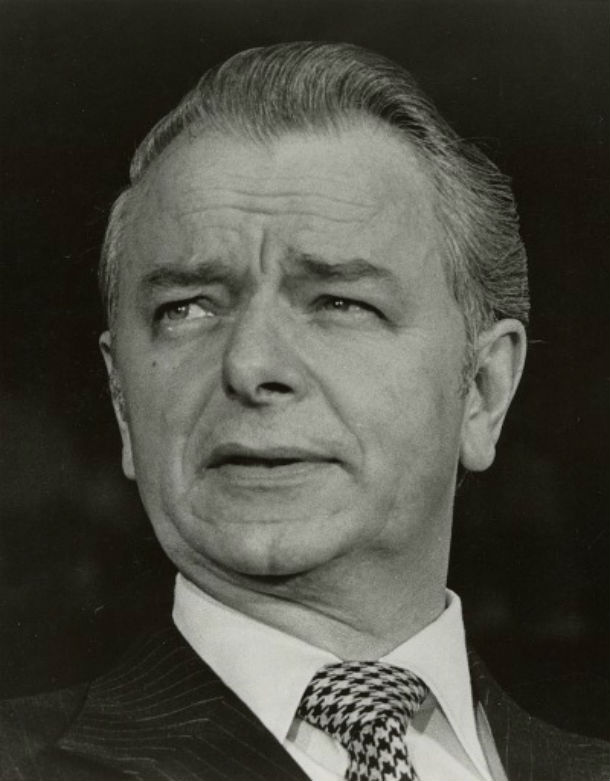
	Majority party	Minority party
Leader	Howard Baker (retired)	Robert Byrd
Party	Republican	Democratic
Leader since	March 5, 1980	January 3, 1977
Leader's seat	Tennessee	West Virginia
Seats before	55	45
Seats won	53	47
Seat change	▼2	▲2
Popular vote	22,850,493	23,079,278
Percentage	49.3%	49.8%
Seats up	19	14
Races won	17	16
- Results of the elections: Democratic gain Republican gain Democratic hold Republican hold No election
Majority Leader before election
Howard Baker
Republican
Elected Majority Leader
Bob Dole
Republican

The 1984 United States Senate elections were held on November 6, with the 33 seats of Class 2 contested in regular elections. They coincided with the landslide re-election of President Ronald Reagan in the presidential election. In spite of the lopsided presidential race, Reagan's Republican Party suffered a net loss of two Senate seats to the Democrats, although it retained control of the Senate with a reduced 53–47 majority.

Democrats defeated incumbents in Illinois and Iowa, and won an open seat in Tennessee, while Republicans defeated an incumbent in Kentucky. This was the first time since 1972 that Democrats gained Class 2 Senate seats.

== Results summary ==
↓
47	53
Democratic	Republican

Parties					Total
Parties	Democratic	Republican	Libertarian	Other	Total
Last elections (1982)	46	54	0	0	100
Before these elections	45	55	0	0	100
Not up	31	36	—	—	67
Up Class 2 (1978→1984)	14	19	—	—	33
Incumbent retired	2	2	—	—	4
Held by same party	2	1	—	—	3
Replaced by other party	▼1 Republican replaced by ▲1 Democrat		—	—	1
Result	3	1	—	—	4
Incumbent ran	12	17	—	—	29
Won re-election	11	15	—	—	26
Lost re-election	▼2 Republicans replaced by ▲2 Democrats ▼1 Democrat replaced by ▲1 Republican		—	—	3
Lost renomination, but held by same party	0	0	—	—	0
Result	13	16	—	—	29
Total elected	16	17	0	0	33
Net gain/loss	▲2	▼2	Steady	Steady	2
Nationwide vote	23,079,278	22,850,493	160,798	232,231	46,322,800
Share	49.82%	49.33%	0.35%	0.50%	100%
Result	47	53	0	0	100

Source: Office of the Clerk

== Gains, losses, and holds ==
=== Retirements ===
Map of retirements: Republican incumbent Democratic incumbent Democratic incumbent retired Republican incumbent retired

Two Republicans and two Democrats retired instead of seeking re-election.

State	Senator	Age at end of term	Assumed office	Replaced by
Massachusetts	Paul Tsongas	43	1979	John Kerry
Tennessee	Howard Baker	59	1967	Al Gore
Texas	John Tower	59	1961 (Note: Elected in the special election to finish Lyndon B. Johnson's term.)	Phil Gramm
West Virginia	Jennings Randolph	82	1958 (Note: Elected in the special election to finish Matthew M. Neely's term.)	Jay Rockefeller

=== Defeats ===
Two Republicans and one Democrat sought re-election but lost in the general election.

State	Senator	Assumed office	Replaced by
Illinois	Charles H. Percy	1967	Paul Simon
Iowa	Roger Jepsen	1979	Tom Harkin
Kentucky	Walter Dee Huddleston	1973	Mitch McConnell

=== Post-election changes ===
State	Senator	Replaced by
North Carolina	John Porter East	Jim Broyhill

== Change in composition ==
=== Before the elections ===
D_{1}	D_{2}	D_{3}	D_{4}	D_{5}	D_{6}	D_{7}	D_{8}	D_{9}	D_{10}
D_{20}	D_{19}	D_{18}	D_{17}	D_{16}	D_{15}	D_{14}	D_{13}	D_{12}	D_{11}
D_{21}	D_{22}	D_{23}	D_{24}	D_{25}	D_{26}	D_{27}	D_{28}	D_{29}	D_{30}
D_{40} Mont. Ran	D_{39} Mich. Ran	D_{38} Mass. Retired	D_{37} La. Ran	D_{36} Ky. Ran	D_{35} Ga. Ran	D_{34} Del. Ran	D_{33} Ark. Ran	D_{32} Ala. Ran	D_{31}
D_{41} Neb. Ran	D_{42} N.J. Ran	D_{43} Okla. Ran	D_{44} R.I. Ran	D_{45} W.Va. Retired	R_{55} Wyo. Ran	R_{54} Va. Ran	R_{53} Texas; Retired	R_{52} Tenn. Retired	R_{51} S.Dak. Ran
Majority →									R_{51} S.Dak. Ran
R_{41} Iowa; Ran	R_{42} Kan. Ran	R_{43} Me. Ran	R_{44} Minn. Ran	R_{45} Miss. Ran	R_{46} N.H. Ran	R_{47} N.M. Ran	R_{48} N.C. Ran	R_{49} Ore. Ran	R_{50} S.C. Ran
R_{40} Ill. Ran	R_{39} Idaho; Ran	R_{38} Colo. Ran	R_{37} Alaska; Ran	R_{36}	R_{35}	R_{34}	R_{33}	R_{32}	R_{31}
R_{21}	R_{22}	R_{23}	R_{24}	R_{25}	R_{26}	R_{27}	R_{28}	R_{29}	R_{30}
R_{20}	R_{19}	R_{18}	R_{17}	R_{16}	R_{15}	R_{14}	R_{13}	R_{12}	R_{11}
R_{1}	R_{2}	R_{3}	R_{4}	R_{5}	R_{6}	R_{7}	R_{8}	R_{9}	R_{10}

=== After the elections ===
D_{1}	D_{2}	D_{3}	D_{4}	D_{5}	D_{6}	D_{7}	D_{8}	D_{9}	D_{10}
D_{20}	D_{19}	D_{18}	D_{17}	D_{16}	D_{15}	D_{14}	D_{13}	D_{12}	D_{11}
D_{21}	D_{22}	D_{23}	D_{24}	D_{25}	D_{26}	D_{27}	D_{28}	D_{29}	D_{30}
D_{40} Neb. Re-elected	D_{39} Mont. Re-elected	D_{38} Mich. Re-elected	D_{37} Mass. Hold	D_{36} La. Re-elected	D_{35} Ga. Re-elected	D_{34} Del. Re-elected	D_{33} Ark. Re-elected	D_{32} Ala. Re-elected	D_{31}
D_{41} N.J. Re-elected	D_{42} Okla. Re-elected	D_{43} R.I. Re-elected	D_{44} W.Va. Hold	D_{45} Ill. Gain	D_{46} Iowa; Gain	D_{47} Tenn. Gain	R_{53} Ky. Gain	R_{52} Wyo. Re-elected	R_{51} Va. Re-elected
Majority →									R_{51} Va. Re-elected
R_{41} Me. Re-elected	R_{42} Minn. Re-elected	R_{43} Miss. Re-elected	R_{44} N.H. Re-elected	R_{45} N.M. Re-elected	R_{46} N.C. Re-elected	R_{47} Ore. Re-elected	R_{48} S.C. Re-elected	R_{49} S.Dak. Re-elected	R_{50} Texas; Hold
R_{40} Kan. Re-elected	R_{39} Idaho; Re-elected	R_{38} Colo. Re-elected	R_{37} Alaska; Re-elected	R_{36}	R_{35}	R_{34}	R_{33}	R_{32}	R_{31}
R_{21}	R_{22}	R_{23}	R_{24}	R_{25}	R_{26}	R_{27}	R_{28}	R_{29}	R_{30}
R_{20}	R_{19}	R_{18}	R_{17}	R_{16}	R_{15}	R_{14}	R_{13}	R_{12}	R_{11}
R_{1}	R_{2}	R_{3}	R_{4}	R_{5}	R_{6}	R_{7}	R_{8}	R_{9}	R_{10}

Key	D_{#} / Democratic; R_{#} / Republican

== Race summary ==
=== Special elections ===
There were no special elections to the U.S. Senate in 1984.

=== Elections leading to the next Congress ===
In these general elections, the winners were elected for the term beginning January 3, 1985; ordered by state.

All of the elections involved the Class 2 seats.

State	Incumbent			Result	Candidates
State	Senator	Party	Electoral history	Result	Candidates
Alabama	Howell Heflin	Democratic	1978	Incumbent re-elected.	▌ ✓ Howell Heflin (Democratic) 62.7%; ▌Albert L. Smith Jr. (Republican) 36.4%; ▌Yana Davis (Libertarian) 0.9%
Alaska	Ted Stevens	Republican	1968 (appointed); 1970; 1972; 1978	Incumbent re-elected.	▌ ✓ Ted Stevens (Republican) 71.2%; ▌John E. Havelock (Democratic) 28.5%
Arkansas	David Pryor	Democratic	1978	Incumbent re-elected.	▌ ✓ David Pryor (Democratic) 57.3%; ▌Ed Bethune (Republican) 42.7%
Colorado	William L. Armstrong	Republican	1978	Incumbent re-elected.	▌ ✓ William L. Armstrong (Republican) 64.2%; ▌Nancy Dick (Democratic) 34.6%; Others: ▌Craig Green (Libertarian) 0.9%; ▌David Martin (Socialist Workers) 0.2%; ▌Earl Higgerson (Prohibition) 0.1%
Delaware	Joe Biden	Democratic	1972; 1978	Incumbent re-elected.	▌ ✓ Joe Biden (Democratic) 60.1%; ▌John M. Burris (Republican) 39.1%
Georgia	Sam Nunn	Democratic	1972 (special); 1972; 1978	Incumbent re-elected.	▌ ✓ Sam Nunn (Democratic) 79.9%; ▌Jon M. Hicks (Republican) 20.1%
Idaho	Jim McClure	Republican	1972; 1978	Incumbent re-elected.	▌ ✓ Jim McClure (Republican) 72.2%; ▌Peter M. Busch (Democratic) 26.0%; ▌Donald Billings (Libertarian) 1.8%
Illinois	Charles H. Percy	Republican	1966; 1972; 1978	Incumbent lost re-election. Democratic gain.	▌ ✓ Paul Simon (Democratic) 50.1%; ▌Charles H. Percy (Republican) 48.2%; Others: ▌Steven Givot (Libertarian) 1.2%; ▌Marjorie Pries (Citizens) 0.2%; ▌Nelson Gonzalez (Socialist Workers) 0.1%; ▌Ishmael Flory (Communist) 0.1%
Iowa	Roger Jepsen	Republican	1978	Incumbent lost re-election. Democratic gain.	▌ ✓ Tom Harkin (Democratic) 55.5%; ▌Roger Jepsen (Republican) 43.7%; ▌Garry De Young (Independent) 0.8%
Kansas	Nancy Kassebaum	Republican	1978; 1978 (appointed)	Incumbent re-elected.	▌ ✓ Nancy Kassebaum (Republican) 76.0%; ▌James R. Maher (Democratic) 21.2%; Others: ▌Lucille Bieger (Conservative) 0.9%; ▌Marian Jackson (American) 0.7%; ▌Douglas Merritt (Libertarian) 0.7%; ▌Freda Steele (Prohibition) 0.5%
Kentucky	Walter Dee Huddleston	Democratic	1972; 1978	Incumbent lost re-election. Republican gain.	▌ ✓ Mitch McConnell (Republican) 49.9%; ▌Walter Dee Huddleston (Democratic) 49.5%; ▌Dave Welters (Socialist Workers) 0.6%
Louisiana	J. Bennett Johnston	Democratic	1972 (appointed); 1972; 1978	Incumbent re-elected.	▌ ✓ J. Bennett Johnston (Democratic) 85.7%; ▌Robert Max Ross (Republican) 8.9%
Maine	William Cohen	Republican	1978	Incumbent re-elected.	▌ ✓ William Cohen (Republican) 73.3%; ▌Libby Mitchell (Democratic) 25.9%; ▌Ann Stoddard (Constitutionalist) 0.8%
Massachusetts	Paul Tsongas	Democratic	1978	Incumbent retired for health reasons. Democratic hold. Incumbent resigned January 2, 1985 to give successor preferential seniority. Winner appointed the same day.	▌ ✓ John Kerry (Democratic) 55.1%; ▌Ray Shamie (Republican) 44.9%
Michigan	Carl Levin	Democratic	1978	Incumbent re-elected.	▌ ✓ Carl Levin (Democratic) 51.8%; ▌Jack R. Lousma (Republican) 47.2%
Minnesota	Rudy Boschwitz	Republican	1978; 1978 (appointed)	Incumbent re-elected.	▌ ✓ Rudy Boschwitz (Republican) 58.1%; ▌Joan Growe (DFL) 41.3%
Mississippi	Thad Cochran	Republican	1978; 1978 (appointed)	Incumbent re-elected.	▌ ✓ Thad Cochran (Republican) 60.9%; ▌William F. Winter (Democratic) 39.1%
Montana	Max Baucus	Democratic	1978; 1978 (appointed)	Incumbent re-elected.	▌ ✓ Max Baucus (Democratic) 56.9%; ▌Chuck Cozzens (Republican) 40.7%; ▌Neil Halprin (Libertarian) 2.4%
Nebraska	J. James Exon	Democratic	1978	Incumbent re-elected.	▌ ✓ J. James Exon (Democratic) 51.9%; ▌Nancy Hoch (Republican) 48.0%
New Hampshire	Gordon J. Humphrey	Republican	1978	Incumbent re-elected.	▌ ✓ Gordon J. Humphrey (Republican) 58.7%; ▌Norman D'Amours (Democratic) 41.0%; ▌Saunder Primack (Libertarian) 0.3%
New Jersey	Bill Bradley	Democratic	1978	Incumbent re-elected.	▌ ✓ Bill Bradley (Democratic) 64.2%; ▌Mary V. Mochary (Republican) 35.2%
New Mexico	Pete Domenici	Republican	1972; 1978	Incumbent re-elected.	▌ ✓ Pete Domenici (Republican) 71.9%; ▌Judith A. Pratt (Democratic) 28.1%
North Carolina	Jesse Helms	Republican	1972; 1978	Incumbent re-elected.	▌ ✓ Jesse Helms (Republican) 51.7%; ▌Jim Hunt (Democratic) 47.8%
Oklahoma	David Boren	Democratic	1978	Incumbent re-elected.	▌ ✓ David Boren (Democratic) 75.6%; ▌Will E. Crozier (Republican) 23.4%; ▌Robert Murphy (Libertarian) 0.9%
Oregon	Mark Hatfield	Republican	1966; 1972; 1978	Incumbent re-elected.	▌ ✓ Mark Hatfield (Republican) 66.5%; ▌Margie Hendriksen (Democratic) 33.4%
Rhode Island	Claiborne Pell	Democratic	1960; 1966; 1972; 1978	Incumbent re-elected.	▌ ✓ Claiborne Pell (Democratic) 72.6%; ▌Barbara Leonard (Republican) 27.4%
South Carolina	Strom Thurmond	Republican	1954 (write-in) (Note: Senator Strom Thurmond was originally elected as a Democrat in 1954, but as a write-in candidate, a special election in 1956 and 1960 before switching to a Republican in 1964. Thurmond won re-election as a Republican in 1966, 1972 and 1978.); 1954 (appointed); 1956 (Resigned); 1956 (special); 1960; 1966; 1972; 1978	Incumbent re-elected.	▌ ✓ Strom Thurmond (Republican) 66.8%; ▌Melvin Purvis Jr. (Democratic) 31.8%
South Dakota	Larry Pressler	Republican	1978	Incumbent re-elected.	▌ ✓ Larry Pressler (Republican) 74.5%; ▌George V. Cunningham (Democratic) 25.5%
Tennessee	Howard Baker	Republican	1966; 1972; 1978	Incumbent retired. Democratic gain.	▌ ✓ Al Gore (Democratic) 60.7%; ▌Victor Ashe (Republican) 33.8%; ▌Ed McAteer (Independent) 5.3%
Texas	John Tower	Republican	1961 (special); 1966; 1972; 1978	Incumbent retired. Republican hold.	▌ ✓ Phil Gramm (Republican) 58.5%; ▌Lloyd Doggett (Democratic) 41.4%
Virginia	John Warner	Republican	1978; 1979 (appointed)	Incumbent re-elected.	▌ ✓ John Warner (Republican) 70.0%; ▌Edythe Harrison (Democratic) 29.9%
West Virginia	Jennings Randolph	Democratic	1958 (special); 1960; 1966; 1972; 1978	Incumbent retired. Democratic hold. Winner seated January 15, 1985 to finish term as Governor of West Virginia.	▌ ✓ Jay Rockefeller (Democratic) 51.8%; ▌John Raese (Republican) 47.7%; ▌Mary Radin (Socialist Workers) 0.5%
Wyoming	Alan Simpson	Republican	1978; 1979 (appointed)	Incumbent re-elected.	▌ ✓ Alan Simpson (Republican) 78.3%; ▌Victor A. Ryan (Democratic) 21.7%

== Closest races ==
In six races the margin of victory was under 10%.

State	Party of winner	Margin
Kentucky	Republican (flip)	0.41%
Illinois	Democratic (flip)	1.86%
West Virginia	Democratic	3.09%
North Carolina	Republican	3.85%
Nebraska	Democratic	3.92%
Michigan	Democratic	4.61%

Minnesota was the tipping point state with a margin of victory of 16.8%.

== Alabama ==
1984 United States Senate election in Alabama
- November 6, 1984
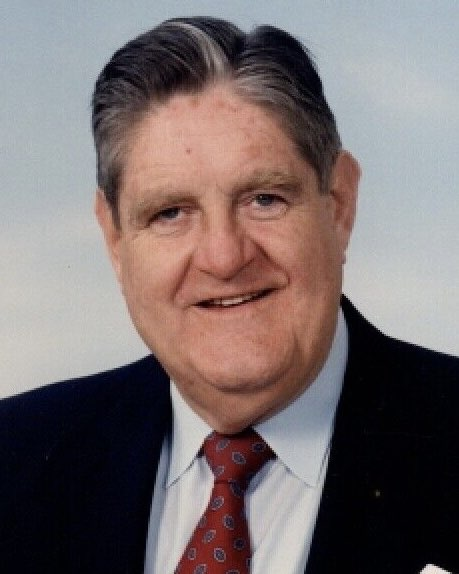

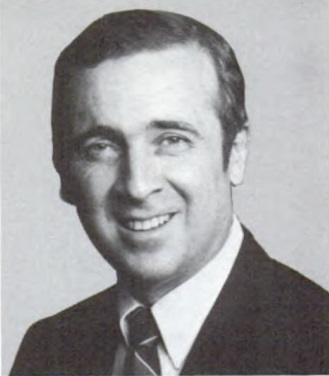
Nominee	Howell Heflin	Albert L. Smith Jr.
Party	Democratic	Republican
Popular vote	857,535	498,508
Percentage	62.7%	36.4%
- County results Heflin: 50–60% 60–70% 70–80% 80–90% Smith: 40–50% 50–60% 60–70%
U.S. senator before election
Howell Heflin
Democratic
Elected U.S. Senator
Howell Heflin
Democratic

Republican primary results by county Smith: 80–90%; 70–80%; 60–70%; 50–60%; 40–50%; 30–40%; Carter: 50–60%; 40–50%; 30–40%; Tie: 30–40%; No Vote

The 1984 United States Senate election in Alabama was held on November 6, 1984. Incumbent Democratic Senator Howell Heflin was easily re-elected to a second term. Heflin received 94% of the black vote.

== Alaska ==
Alaska election
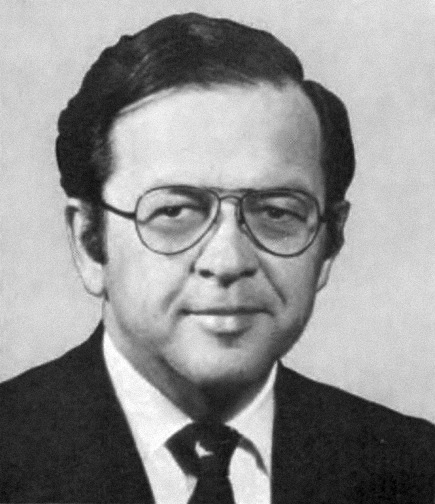

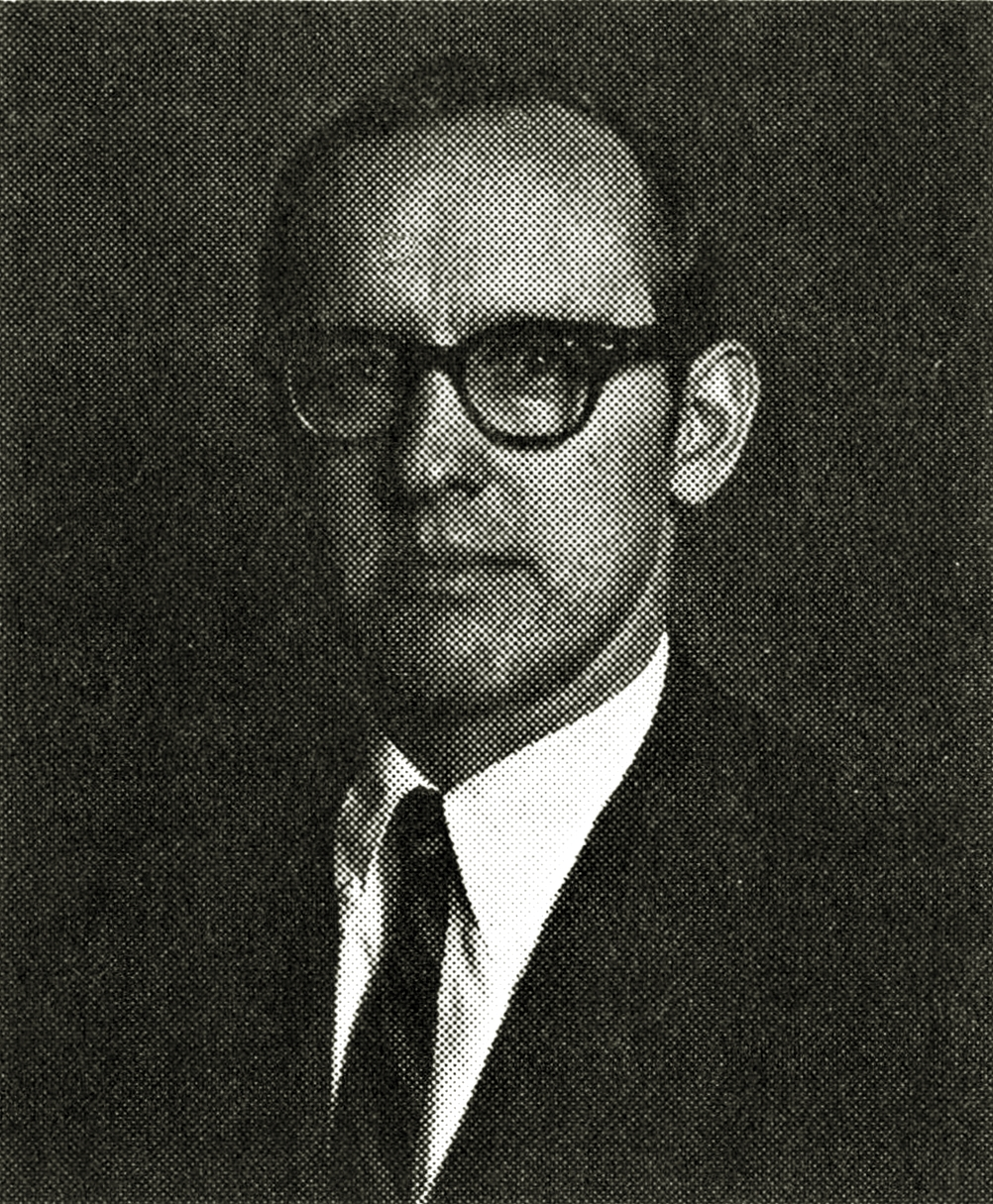
Nominee	Ted Stevens	John Havelock
Party	Republican	Democratic
Popular vote	146,919	58,804
Percentage	71.17%	28.49%
- Results by state house district Stevens: 60–70% 70–80% 80–90%
U.S. senator before election
Ted Stevens
Republican
Elected U.S. Senator
Ted Stevens
Republican

Incumbent Republican Ted Stevens sought re-election to a fourth term. Owing to his popularity and the conservative bent of Alaska, Stevens did not face major opposition, and easily defeated former Alaska Attorney General John Havelock in the general election.

Open primary results
Party	Candidate	Votes	%
Republican	Ted Stevens (incumbent)	65,522	69.22%
Democratic	John Havelock	19,074	20.15%
Democratic	Dave Carlson	4,620	4.88%
Republican	Michael Beasley	2,443	2.58%
Democratic	Joe Tracanna	1,661	1.75%
Democratic	Phil Stoddard	1,331	1.41%
Total votes		94,651	100.00%

Alaska general election
Party	Candidate	Votes	%	±%
Republican	Ted Stevens (Incumbent)	146,919	71.17%	−4.42%
Democratic	John E. Havelock	58,804	28.49%	+4.39%
Write-ins		715	0.35%	
Majority		88,115	42.68%	−8.81%
Turnout		206,438		
Republican hold		Swing		

== Arkansas ==
Arkansas election

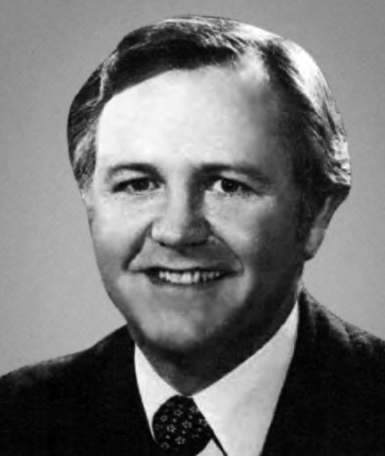
Nominee	David Pryor	Ed Bethune
Party	Democratic	Republican
Popular vote	502,341	373,615
Percentage	57.35%	42.65%
- County results Pryor: 50–60% 60–70% 70–80% Bethune: 50–60% 60–70%
U.S. senator before election
David Pryor
Democratic
Elected U.S. Senator
David Pryor
Democratic

Incumbent Democrat David Pryor won re-election to a second term over Republican U.S. Representative Ed Bethune.

General election results
Party	Candidate	Votes	%
Democratic	David Pryor (Incumbent)	502,341	57.35%
Republican	Ed Bethune	373,615	42.65%
Majority		128,726	14.70%
Turnout		875,956	
Democratic hold			

== Colorado ==
Colorado election
- November 6, 1984
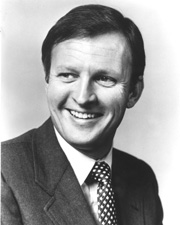

Nominee	William L. Armstrong	Nancy Dick
Party	Republican	Democratic
Popular vote	833,821	449,327
Percentage	64.25%	34.62%
- County results Armstrong: 40-50% 50–60% 60–70% 70–80% Dick: 50–60% 60–70%
U.S. senator before election
William L. Armstrong
Republican
Elected U.S. Senator
William L. Armstrong
Republican

Incumbent Republican William L. Armstrong won re-election to a second term over Democratic Lieutenant Governor of Colorado Nancy Dick.

1984 United States Senate election in Colorado
Party	Candidate	Votes	%
Republican	William L. Armstrong (Incumbent)	833,821	64.25%
Democratic	Nancy Dick	449,327	34.62%
Libertarian	Craig Green	11,077	0.85%
Socialist Workers	David Martin	2,208	0.17%
Prohibition	Earl Higgerson	1,376	0.11%
Majority		384,494	29.63%
Total votes		1,297,809	100.00%
Republican hold			

== Delaware ==
Delaware election
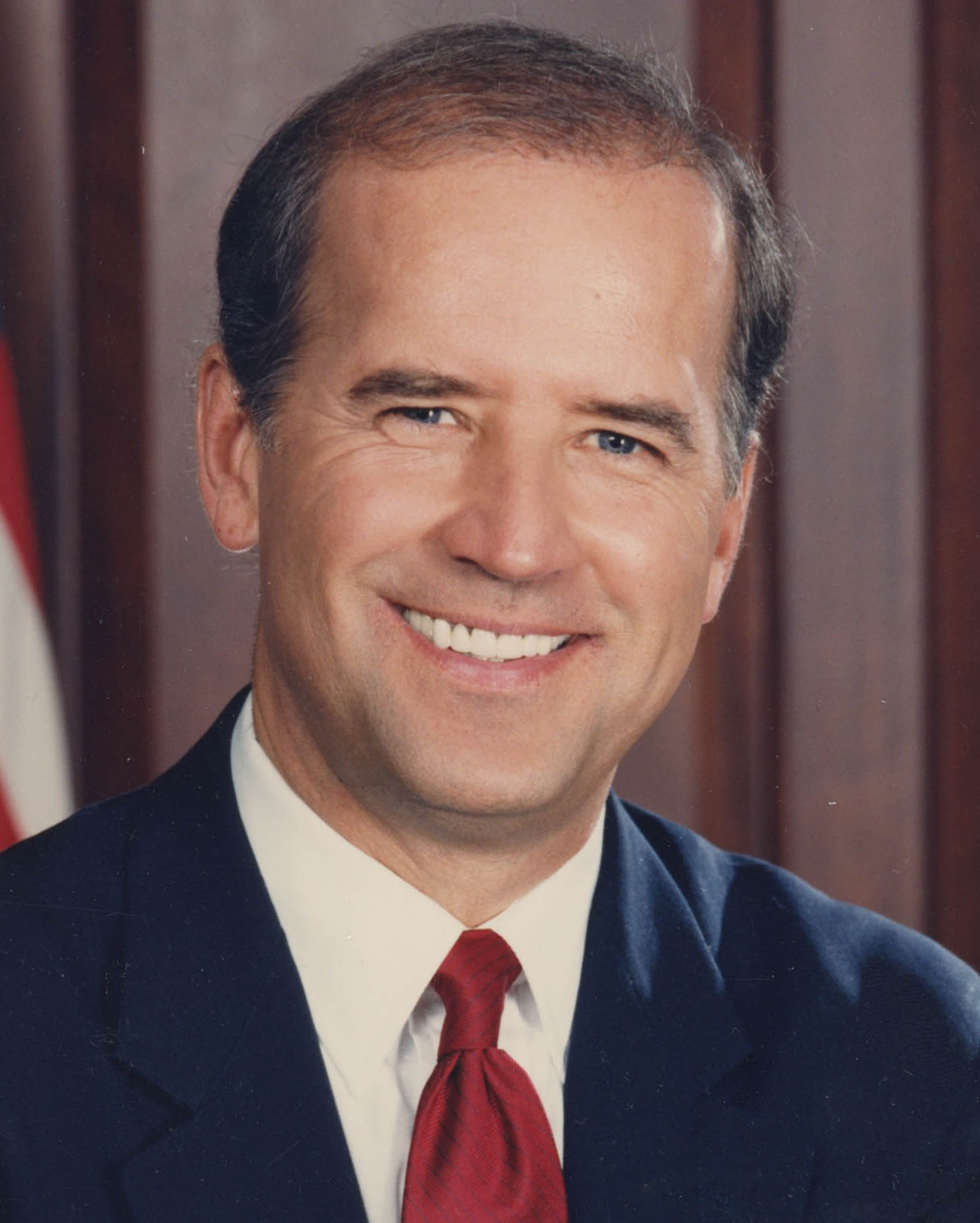

Nominee	Joe Biden	John M. Burris
Party	Democratic	Republican
Popular vote	147,831	98,101
Percentage	60.11%	39.89%
- County results Biden: 50–60% 60–70%
U.S. senator before election
Joe Biden
Democratic
Elected U.S. Senator
Joe Biden
Democratic

Incumbent Democrat and future President of the United States Joe Biden won re-election to a third term, defeating Republican challenger John M. Burris, former Majority Leader of the Delaware House of Representatives.

General election results
Party	Candidate	Votes	%	±%
Democratic	Joe Biden (Incumbent)	147,831	60.11%	+2.15%
Republican	John M. Burris	98,101	39.89%	−1.13%
Majority		49,730	20.22%	+3.28%
Turnout		245,932		
Democratic hold		Swing		

== Georgia ==
Georgia election
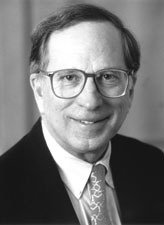

Nominee	Sam Nunn	Mike Hicks
Party	Democratic	Republican
Popular vote	1,344,104	337,196
Percentage	79.9%	20.1%
- County results Nunn: 60–70% 70–80% 80–90% >90%
U.S. senator before election
Sam Nunn
Democratic
Elected U.S. Senator
Sam Nunn
Democratic

Incumbent Democrat Sam Nunn won re-election to a third term over Republican educator, Mike Hicks

General election results
Party	Candidate	Votes	%	±%
Democratic	Sam Nunn (Incumbent)	1,344,104	79.94%	−3.19%
Republican	Mike Hicks	337,196	20.06%	+3.19%
Majority		1,006,908	59.88%	−6.39%
Turnout		1,681,300		
Democratic hold		Swing		

== Idaho ==
Idaho election
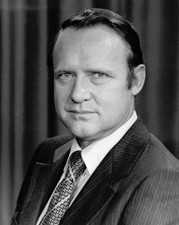

Nominee	James A. McClure	Peter M. Busch
Party	Republican	Democratic
Popular vote	293,193	105,591
Percentage	72.19%	26.00%
- County Results; McClure: 50–60% 60–70% 70–80% 80–90% 90–100%
U.S. senator before election
James A. McClure
Republican
Elected U.S. Senator
James A. McClure
Republican

Incumbent Republican James A. McClure won re-election to a third term over Democratic Vietnam War veteran, Peter M. Busch.

1984 United States Senate election in Idaho
Party	Candidate	Votes	%
Republican	James A. McClure (Incumbent)	293,193	72.19%
Democratic	Peter M. Busch	105,591	26.00%
Libertarian	Donald B. Billings	7,384	1.82%
Majority		187,602	46.19%
Total votes		406,168	100.00%
Republican hold			

== Illinois ==
Illinois election
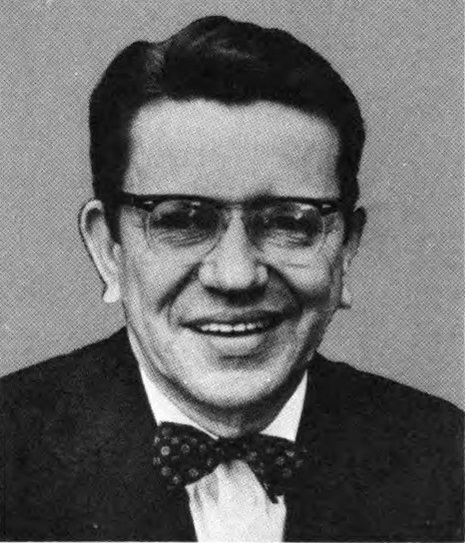

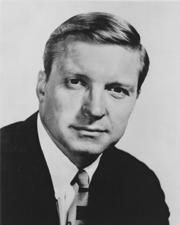
Nominee	Paul Simon	Charles Percy
Party	Democratic	Republican
Popular vote	2,397,165	2,308,039
Percentage	50.07%	48.21%
- County results Simon: 40–50% 50–60% 60–70% Percy: 40–50% 50–60% 60–70%
U.S. senator before election
Charles H. Percy
Republican
Elected U.S. Senator
Paul Simon
Democratic

Incumbent Republican Charles H. Percy ran for re-election to a fourth term in the United States Senate. Senator Percy was opposed by Democratic nominee Paul Simon, who was a United States Congressman from Illinois's 22nd congressional district. The campaign between Percy and Simon was brutal and toughly-fought, and ended up with Simon ousting Percy by fewer than 90,000 votes, which was, at the time, considered an upset.

The election was very close. Simon prevailed by only 89,126 votes, or 1.86%. Incumbent Percy did well all throughout the state, including the Chicago collar counties. However, Simon received huge numbers out of the heavily populated and Democratic Cook County, which encompasses most of the Chicago Metropolitan Area. Percy led early on and well into the night, but as Cook County began to count all of its votes, Simon pulled ahead. Simon won despite then-president Reagan winning the state easily. Percy called Simon at around 5 A.M. the next day and conceded. Percy also congratulated Simon on his hard-earned victory. Simon was sworn in on January 3, 1985, and served in the senate until January 3, 1997, when he retired. Simon was later succeeded by Dick Durbin, a close friend and fellow Democrat.

Illinois general election
Party	Candidate	Votes	%	±%
Democratic	Paul Simon	2,397,165	50.07%	+4.60%
Republican	Charles H. Percy (Incumbent)	2,308,039	48.21%	−5.13%
Libertarian	Steve I. Givot	59,777	1.25%	+0.74%
Independent	Marjorie H. Pries	12,366	0.26%	
Socialist Workers	Nelson Gonzalez	4,913	0.10%	−0.40%
Communist	Ishmael Flory	4,802	0.10%	
Write-ins		273	0.01%	
Majority		89,126	1.86%	−6.00%
Turnout		4,787,335		
Democratic gain from Republican		Swing		

== Iowa ==
Iowa election
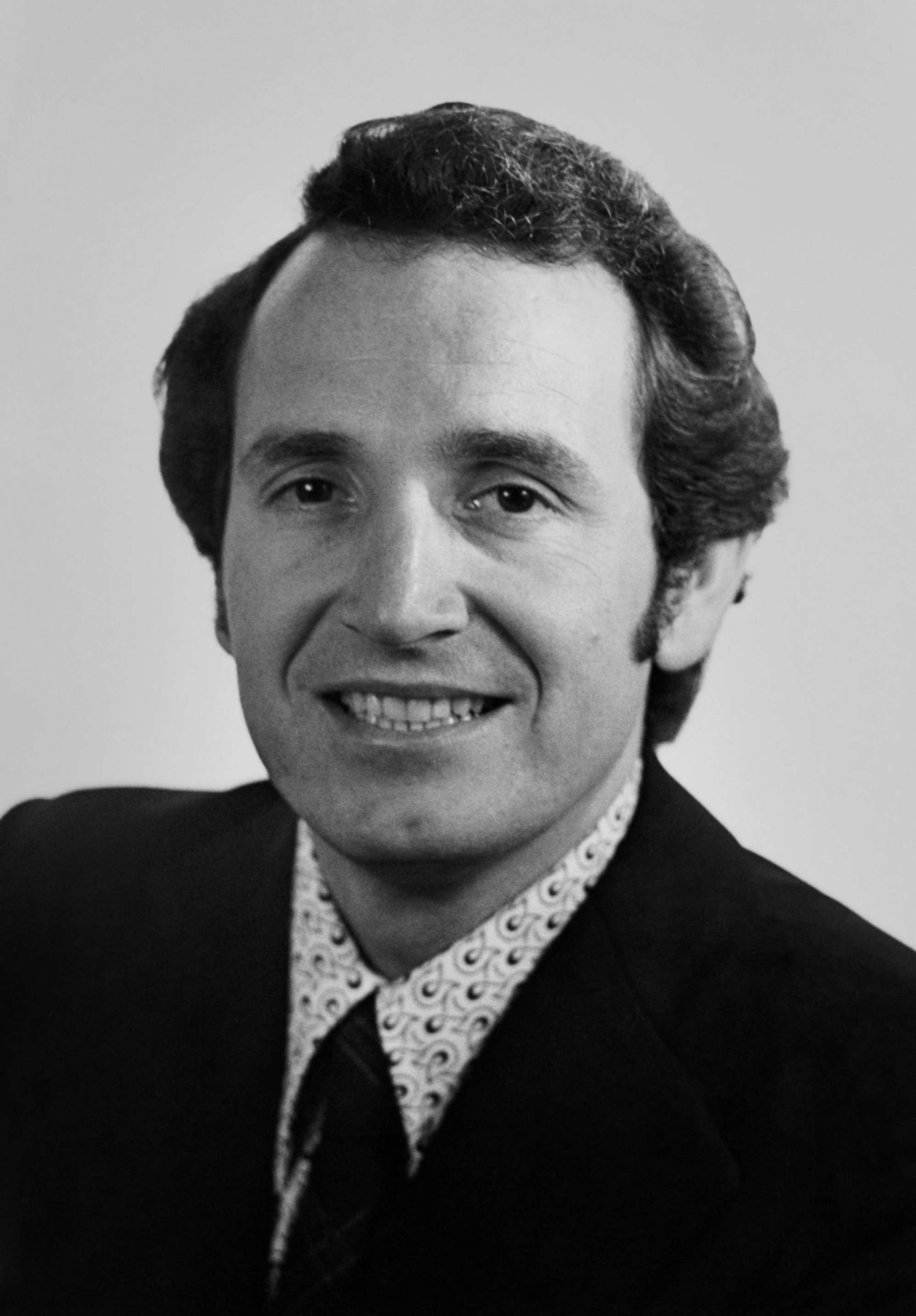

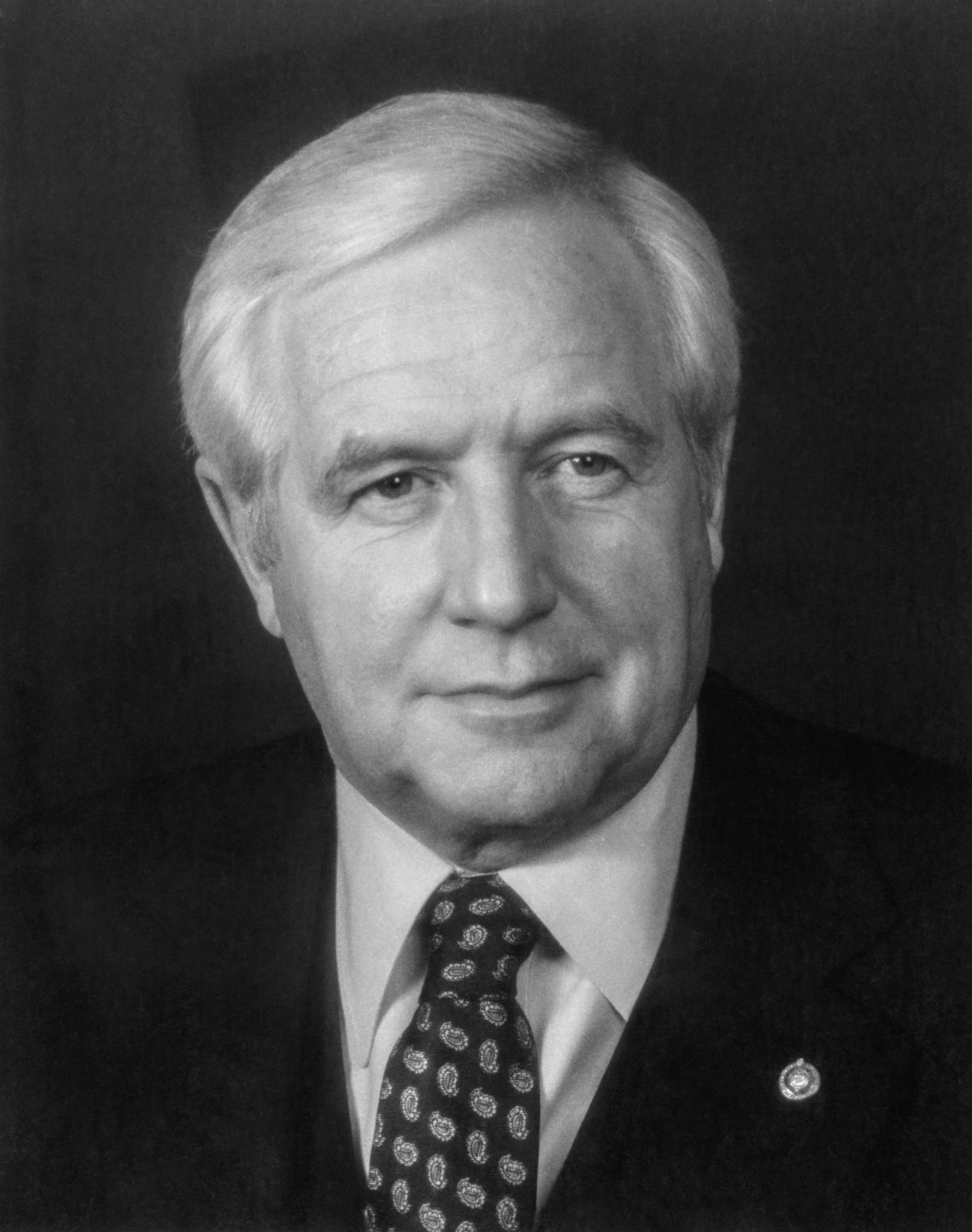
Nominee	Tom Harkin	Roger Jepsen
Party	Democratic	Republican
Popular vote	716,883	564,381
Percentage	55.46%	43.66%
- County results Harkin: 40–50% 50–60% 60–70% Jepsen: 40–50% 50–60% 60–70% 70–80%
U.S. senator before election
Roger Jepsen
Republican
Elected U.S. Senator
Tom Harkin
Democratic

Incumbent Republican Roger Jepsen ran for re-election to a second term in the United States Senate. Jepsen was opposed by United States Congressman Tom Harkin, from Iowa's 5th congressional district, who won the Democratic primary uncontested. The general election was full of mudslinging and personal attacks, including the embellishment by both candidates of their military records; Harkin attacked Jepsen for failing to keep his promise to not sell AWACS aircraft to Saudi Arabia. Ultimately, Harkin defeated Jepsen by a wide margin, winning the first of five terms in the Senate.

Democratic primary results
Party	Candidate	Votes	%
Democratic	Tom Harkin	106,005	99.93%
Democratic	Write-ins	70	0.07%
Total votes		106,075	100.00%

Republican primary results
Party	Candidate	Votes	%
Republican	Roger Jepsen (Incumbent)	113,996	99.87%
Republican	Write-ins	147	0.13%
Total votes		114,143	100.00%

Iowa general election
Party	Candidate	Votes	%	±%
Democratic	Tom Harkin	716,883	55.46%	+7.54%
Republican	Roger Jepsen (Incumbent)	564,381	43.66%	−7.47%
Independent	Garry De Young	11,014	0.85%	
Write-ins		422	0.03%	
Majority		152,502	11.80%	+8.58%
Turnout		1,292,700		
Democratic gain from Republican		Swing		

== Kansas ==
Kansas election
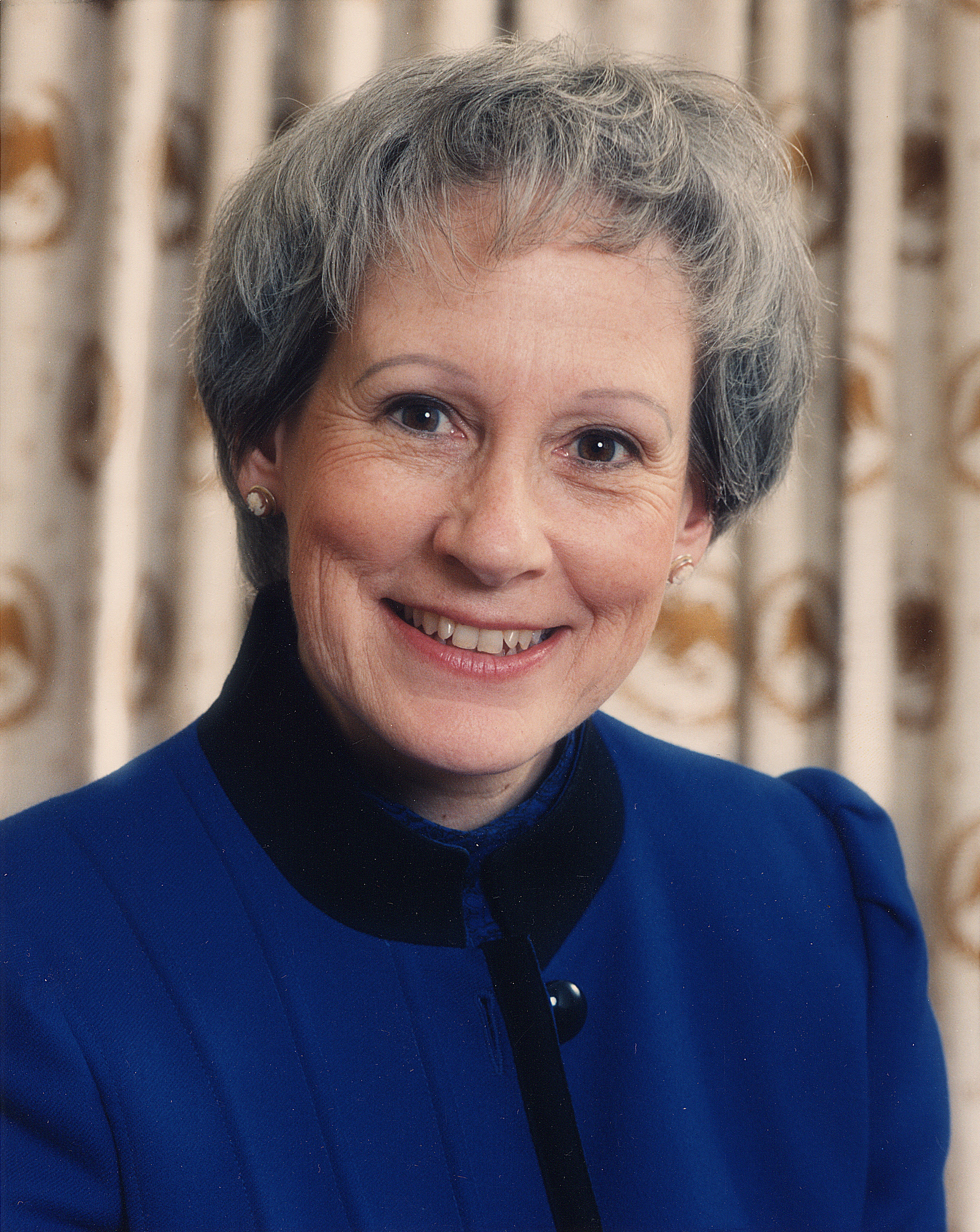

Nominee	Nancy Kassebaum	James R. Maher
Party	Republican	Democratic
Popular vote	757,402	211,664
Percentage	75.99%	21.24%
- County Results; Kassebaum: 50-60% 60-70% 70-80% 80-90%
U.S. senator before election
Nancy Kassebaum
Republican
Elected U.S. Senator
Nancy Kassebaum
Republican

Incumbent Republican Nancy Kassebaum won re-election to a second term over Democrat James R. Maher, a financial consultant.

1984 United States Senate election in Kansas
Party	Candidate	Votes	%
Republican	Nancy Kassebaum (incumbent)	757,402	75.99%
Democratic	James R. Maher	211,664	21.24%
Conservative	Lucille Bieger	9,380	0.94%
American	Marian Ruck Jackson	6,918	0.69%
Libertarian	Douglas N. Merritt	6,755	0.68%
Prohibition	Freda H. Steele	4,610	0.46%
Majority		545,738	54.75%
Total votes		996,729	100.00%
Republican hold			

== Kentucky ==
Kentucky election
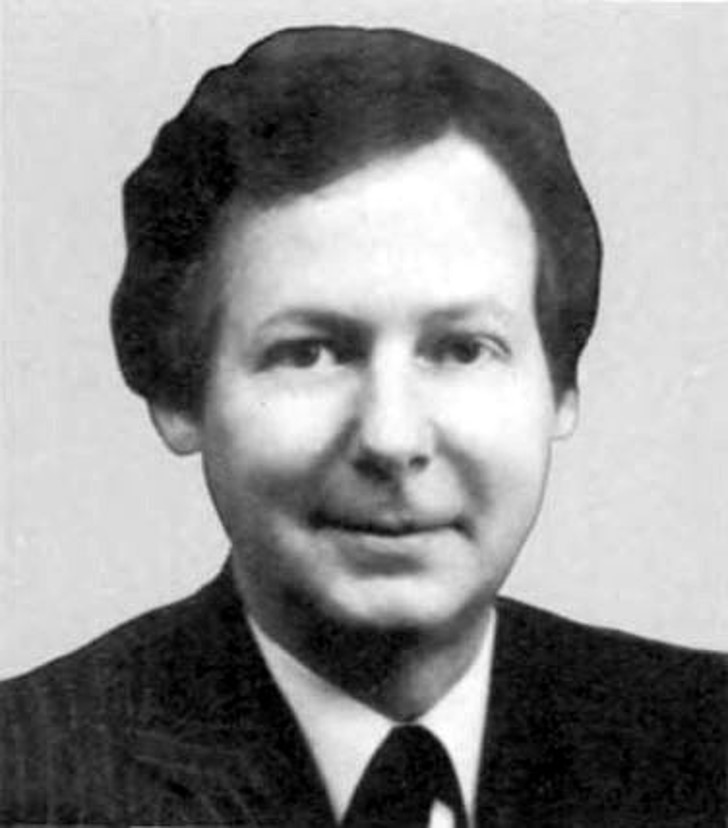

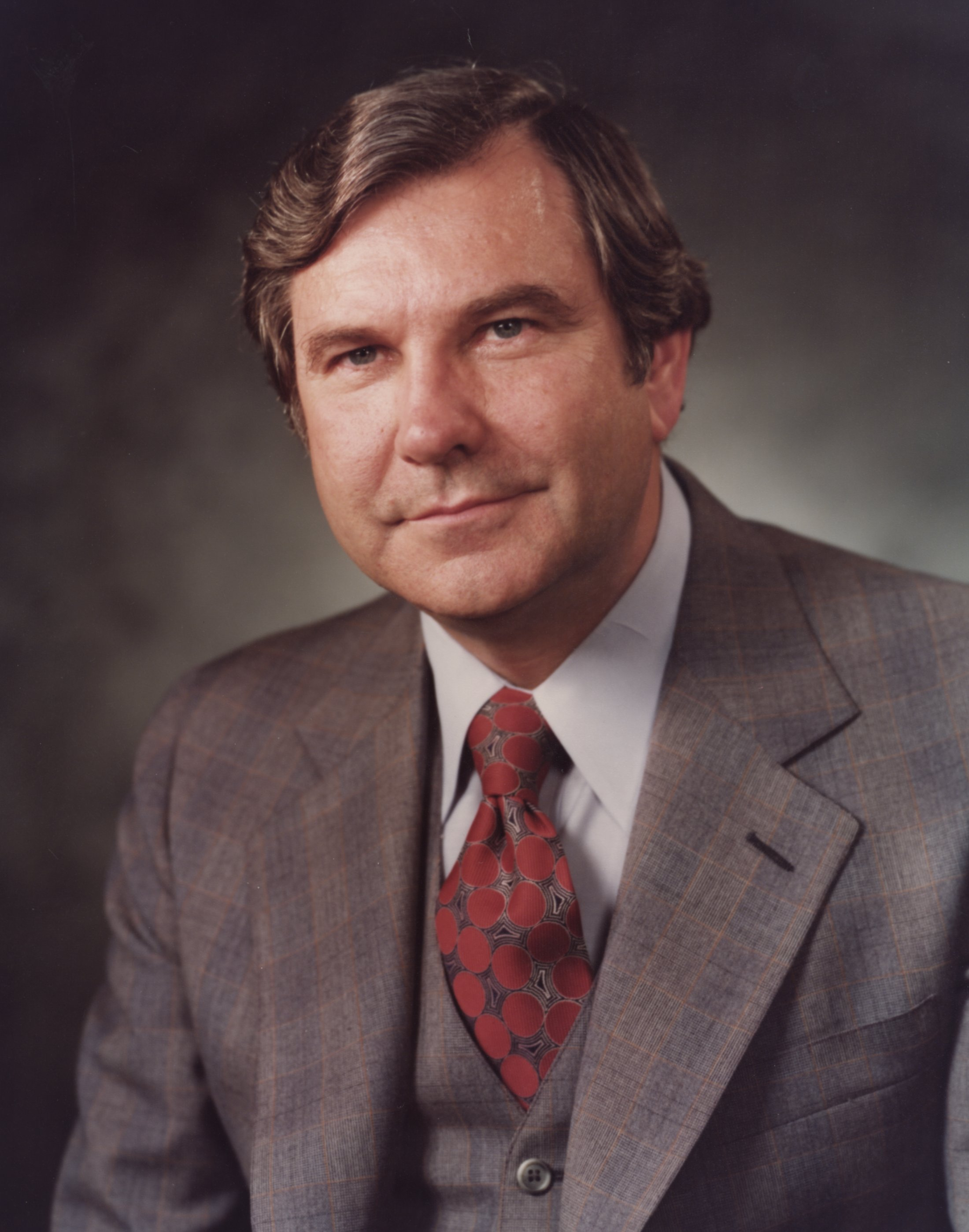
Nominee	Mitch McConnell	Walter Huddleston
Party	Republican	Democratic
Popular vote	644,990	639,721
Percentage	49.9%	49.5%
- County results McConnell: 50–60% 60–70% 70–80% 80–90% Huddleston: 50–60% 60–70% 70–80% 80–90%
U.S. senator before election
Walter Huddleston
Democratic
Elected U.S. Senator
Mitch McConnell
Republican

Incumbent Democrat Walter Huddleston ran for re-election to a third term, but lost by less than 0.5% to Jefferson County Executive Mitch McConnell.

Huddleston was unopposed in the Democratic Party's primary.

Republican primary results
Party	Candidate	Votes	%
Republican	Mitch McConnell	39,465	79.22%
Republican	C. Roger Harker	3,798	7.62%
Republican	Tommy Klein	3,352	6.73%
Republican	Thurman Jerome Hamlin	3,202	6.43%
Total votes		49,817	100.00%

General election results
Party	Candidate	Votes	%	±%
Republican	Mitch McConnell	644,990	49.90%	+13.03%
Democratic	Walter Huddleston (Incumbent)	639,721	49.50%	−11.48%
Socialist Workers	Dave Welters	7,696	0.60%	
Majority		5,269	0.41%	−23.70%
Turnout		1,292,407		
Republican gain from Democratic		Swing		

== Louisiana ==
1984 United States Senate election in Louisiana
- September 29, 1984
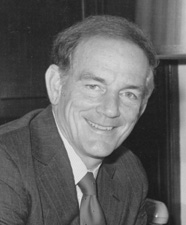

Nominee	J. Bennett Johnston	Robert M. Ross	Larry Napoleon Cooper
Party	Democratic	Republican	Republican
Popular vote	838,181	86,546	52,746
Percentage	85.75%	8.85%	5.4%
- Parish results Johnston: 70–80% 80–90% >90%
U.S. senator before election
J. Bennett Johnston
Democratic
Elected U.S. Senator
J. Bennett Johnston
Democratic

Incumbent Democratic J. Bennett Johnston won unopposed to a third term.

1984 United States Senate election in Louisiana
Party	Candidate	Votes	%
Democratic	J. Bennett Johnston (Incumbent)	Unopposed	
Democratic hold			

== Maine ==
Maine election
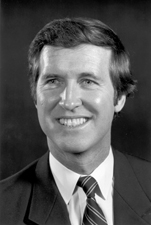
Nominee	William Cohen	Libby Mitchell
Party	Republican	Democratic
Popular vote	404,414	142,626
Percentage	73.3%	25.9%
- County results Cohen: 60–70% 70–80%
U.S. senator before election
William Cohen
Republican
Elected U.S. Senator
William Cohen
Republican

Incumbent Republican William Cohen won re-election to a second term over Democrat Libby Mitchell, State Representative.

General election results
Party	Candidate	Votes	%
Republican	William Cohen (Incumbent)	404,414	73.34%
Democratic	Libby Mitchell	142,626	25.87%
Constitutionalist	P. Ann Stoddard	4,338	0.79%
Majority		261,788	47.47%
Turnout		551,378	
Republican hold			

== Massachusetts ==
Massachusetts election
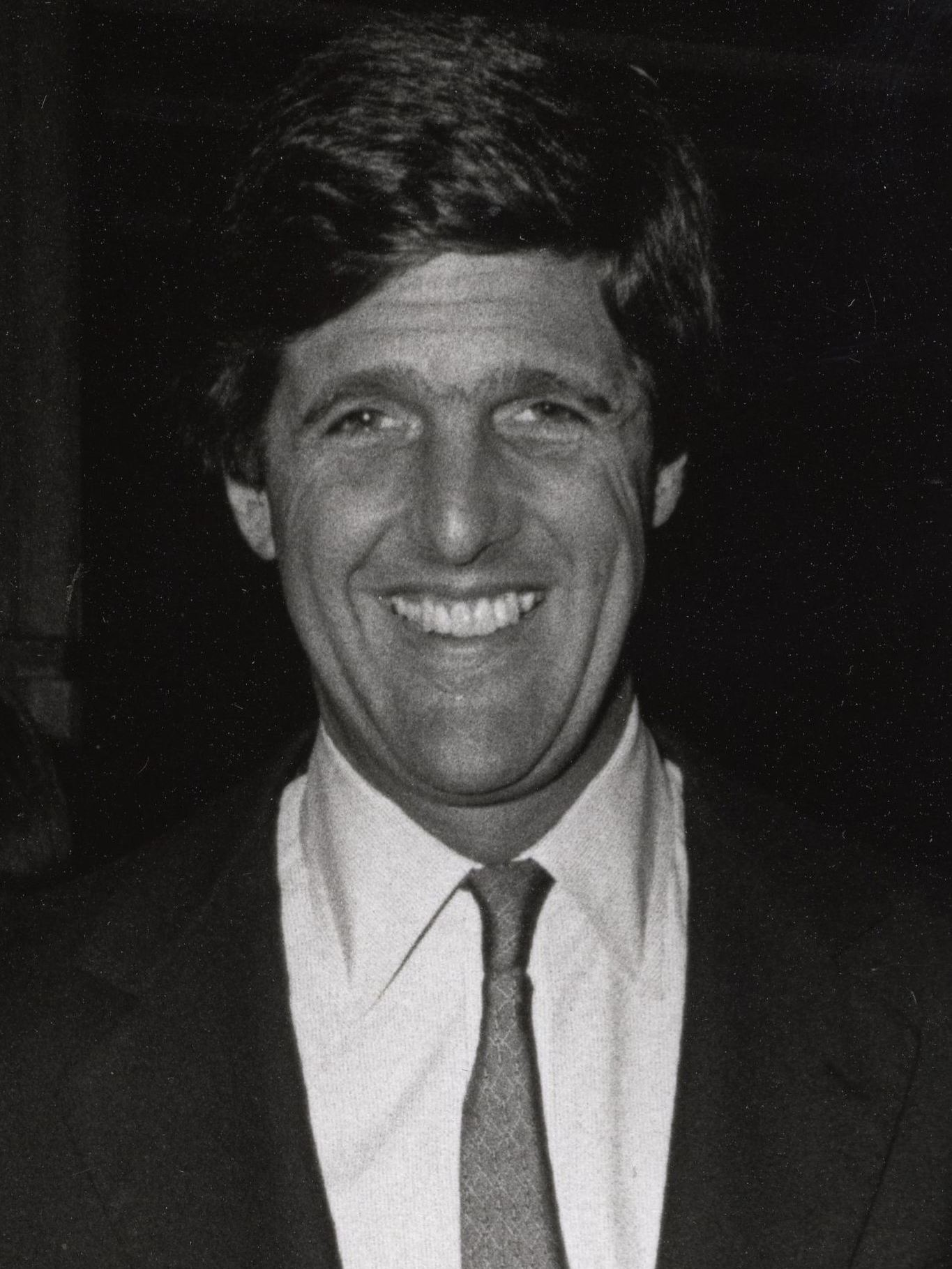

Nominee	John Kerry	Ray Shamie
Party	Democratic	Republican
Popular vote	1,393,150	1,136,913
Percentage	55.06%	44.94%

Kerry
50–60%
60–70%
70–80%
80–90%
Shamie
50–60%
60–70%
70–80%
U.S. senator before election
Paul Tsongas
Democratic
Elected U.S. Senator
John Kerry
Democratic

The election was won by Democrat John Kerry, the Lieutenant Governor of Massachusetts who remained Senator until 2013 when he resigned to become U.S. Secretary of State. One-term incumbent Paul Tsongas declined to seek re-election and retired from the Senate following a battle with cancer.

Democratic Primary
Party	Candidate	Votes	%
Democratic	John Kerry	322,470	40.83%
Democratic	James Shannon	297,941	37.72%
Democratic	David M. Bartley	85,910	10.88%
Democratic	Michael Connolly	82,999	10.51%
	All others	502	0.06%

Republican Primary
Party	Candidate	Votes	%
Republican	Ray Shamie	173,851	62.38%
Republican	Elliot Richardson	104,761	37.59%
	All others	70	0.03%

General election
Party	Candidate	Votes	%
Democratic	John Kerry	1,393,150	55.06%
Republican	Ray Shamie	1,136,913	44.94%
	All others	408	0.02%
Turnout		2,530,063	
Majority		256,237	10.12%
Democratic hold			

== Michigan ==
Michigan election
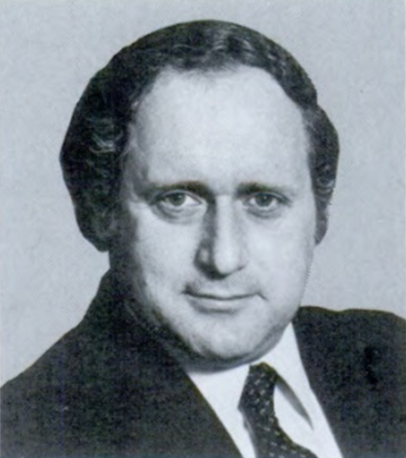

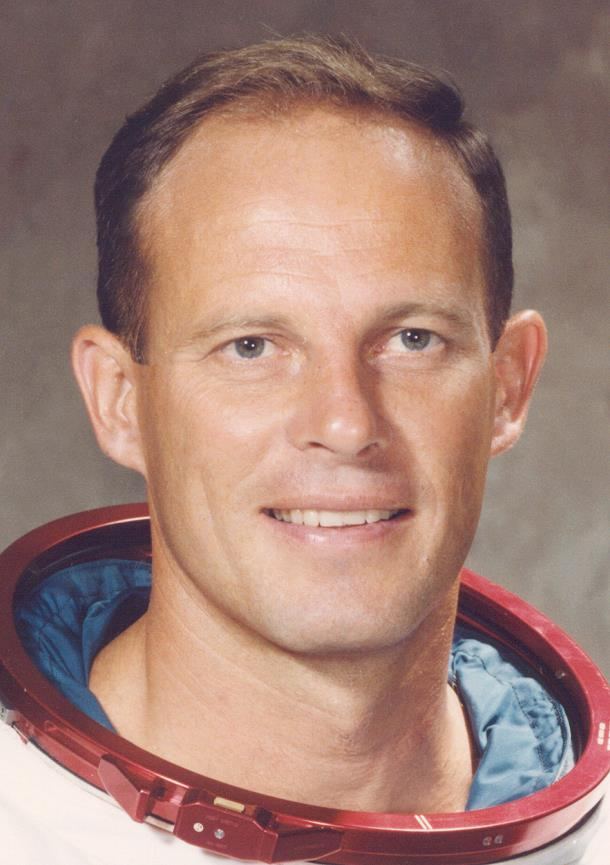
Nominee	Carl Levin	Jack Lousma
Party	Democratic	Republican
Popular vote	1,915,831	1,745,302
Percentage	51.8%	47.2%
- County results Levin: 40–50% 50–60% 60–70% Lousma: 50–60% 60–70% 70–80%
U.S. senator before election
Carl Levin
Democratic
Elected U.S. Senator
Carl Levin
Democratic

Incumbent Democrat Carl Levin won re-election to a second term.

General election results
Party	Candidate	Votes	%
Democratic	Carl Levin (Incumbent)	1,915,831	51.8%
Republican	Jack Lousma	1,745,302	47.2%
Tisch Citizens	Arthur Richard Tisch	22,882	0.6%
Libertarian	Lynn Johnston	7,786	0.2%
Socialist	Helen Meyers	2,686	0.1%
Workers World	William Roundtree	2,279	0.1%
Independent	Max Dean	2,135	0.1%
Communist	Samuel L. Webb	1,196	0.0%
Workers League	Fred Mazelis	818	0.0%
Turnout		3,700,915	
Majority		170,529	4.6%
Democratic hold			

== Minnesota ==
Minnesota election

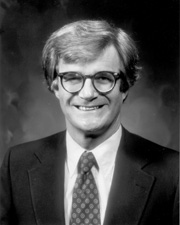

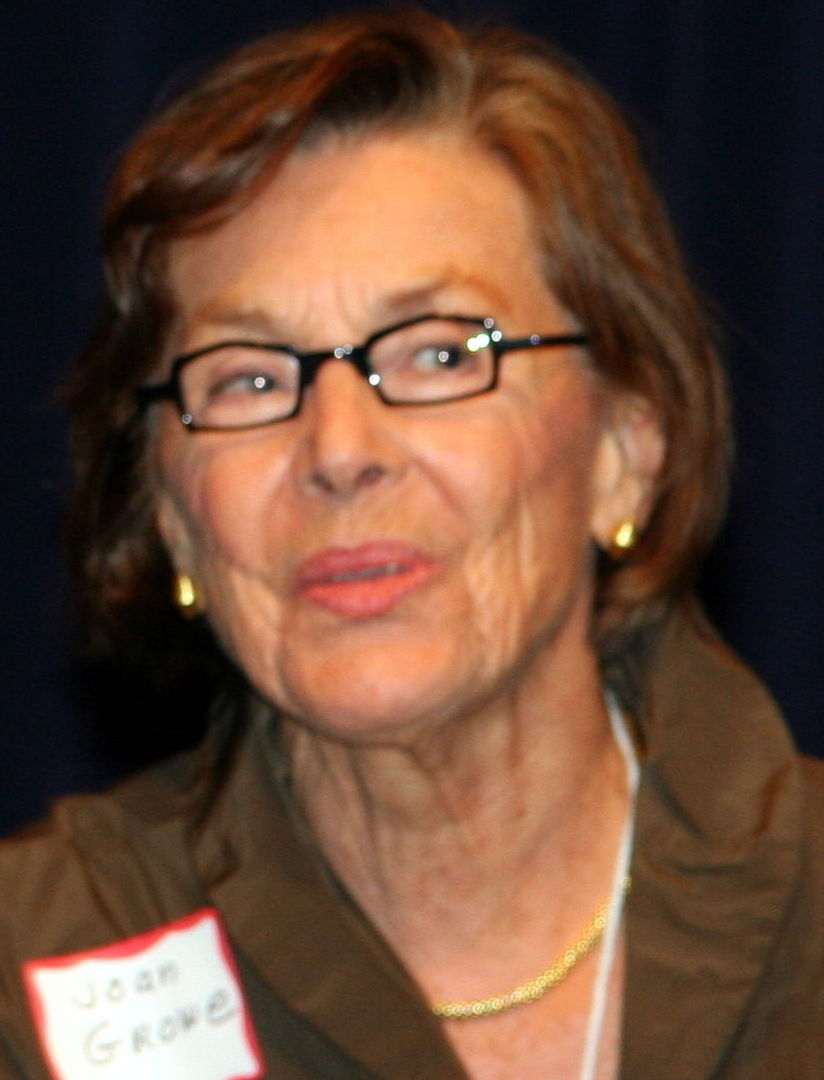
Nominee	Rudy Boschwitz	Joan Growe
Party	Republican	Democratic (DFL)
Popular vote	1,199,926	852,844
Percentage	58.08%	41.28%
- County results Boschwitz: 50–60% 60–70% 70–80% Growe: 40–50% 50–60%
U.S. senator before election
Rudy Boschwitz
Republican
Elected U.S. Senator
Rudy Boschwitz
Republican

Incumbent Republican Rudy Boschwitz defeated Democratic challenger Joan Growe, Minnesota Secretary of State.

General election results
Party	Candidate	Votes	%
Republican	Rudy Boschwitz (Incumbent)	1,199,926	58.08%
Democratic	Joan Growe	852,844	41.28%
Socialist Workers	Eleanor Garcia	5,351	0.26%
New Union Party	Jeffrey M. Miller	4,653	0.23%
Libertarian	Richard Putman	3,129	0.15%
Turnout		2,065,903	
Majority		347,082	16.8%
Republican hold			

== Mississippi ==
Mississippi election
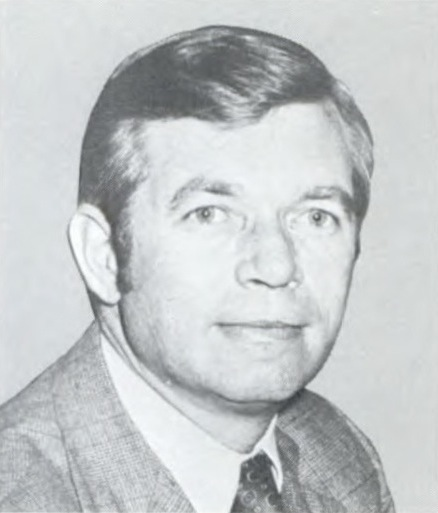

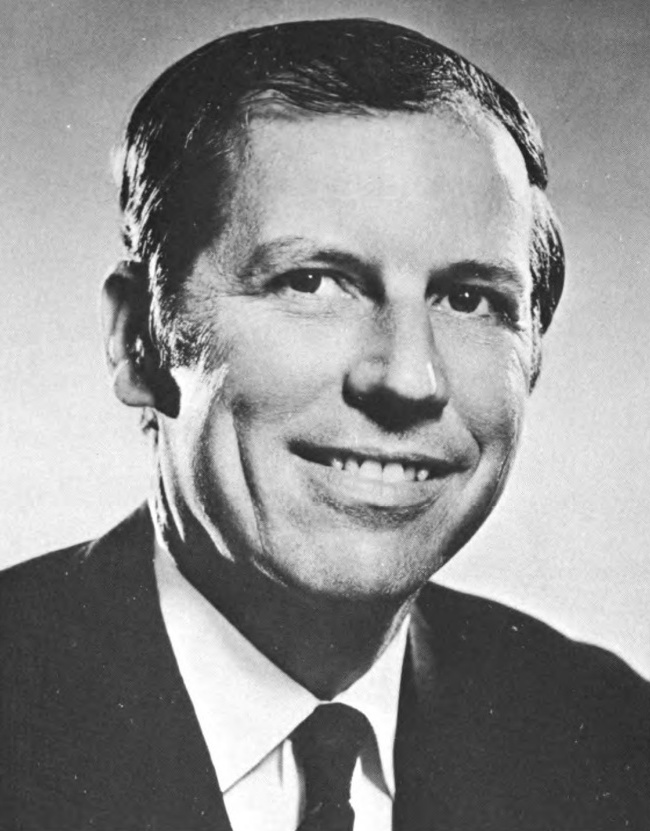
Nominee	Thad Cochran	William Winter
Party	Republican	Democratic
Popular vote	580,314	371,926
Percentage	60.9%	39.1%
- Cochran: 50–60% 60–70% 70–80% Winter: 50–60% 60–70% 70–80%
U.S. senator before election
Thad Cochran
Republican
Elected U.S. Senator
Thad Cochran
Republican

Incumbent Republican Thad Cochran won re-election to a second term over former Democratic Governor William Winter.

Mississippi U.S. Senate Election, 1984
Party	Candidate	Votes	%
Republican	Thad Cochran (Incumbent)	580,314	60.9%
Democratic	William Winter	371,926	39.1%
Turnout		952,240	
Majority		298,388	21.8%
Republican hold			

== Montana ==
Montana election
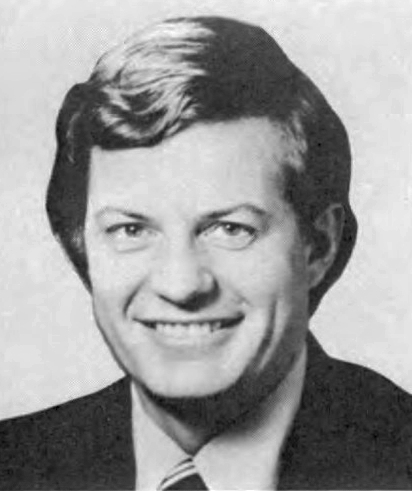

Nominee	Max Baucus	Chuck Cozzens
Party	Democratic	Republican
Popular vote	215,704	154,308
Percentage	56.89%	40.70%
- County results Baucus: 40–50% 50–60% 60–70% 70–80% Cozzens: 40–50% 50–60%
U.S. senator before election
Max Baucus
Democratic
Elected U.S. Senator
Max Baucus
Democratic

Incumbent Max Baucus ran for re-election. He easily won renomination in the Democratic primary, and advanced to the general election, where he faced Chuck Cozzens, a former State Representative and the Republican nominee. Despite President Ronald Reagan's strong performance in the state that year, Baucus was able to easily win a second term over Cozzens.

Democratic Party primary results
Party	Candidate	Votes	%
Democratic	Max Baucus (Incumbent)	80,726	79.37%
Democratic	Bob Ripley	20,979	20.63%
Total votes		101,705	100.00%

Republican Primary results
Party	Candidate	Votes	%
Republican	Chuck Cozzens	33,661	50.78%
Republican	Ralph Bouma	17,900	27.00%
Republican	Aubyn Curtiss	14,729	22.22%
Total votes		66,290	100.00%

Montana general election
Party	Candidate	Votes	%	±%
Democratic	Max Baucus (Incumbent)	215,704	56.89%	+1.20%
Republican	Chuck Cozzens	154,308	40.70%	−3.61%
Libertarian	Neil Haprin	9,143	2.41%	
Majority		61,396	16.19%	+4.81%
Turnout		379,155		
Democratic hold		Swing		

== Nebraska ==
Nebraska election
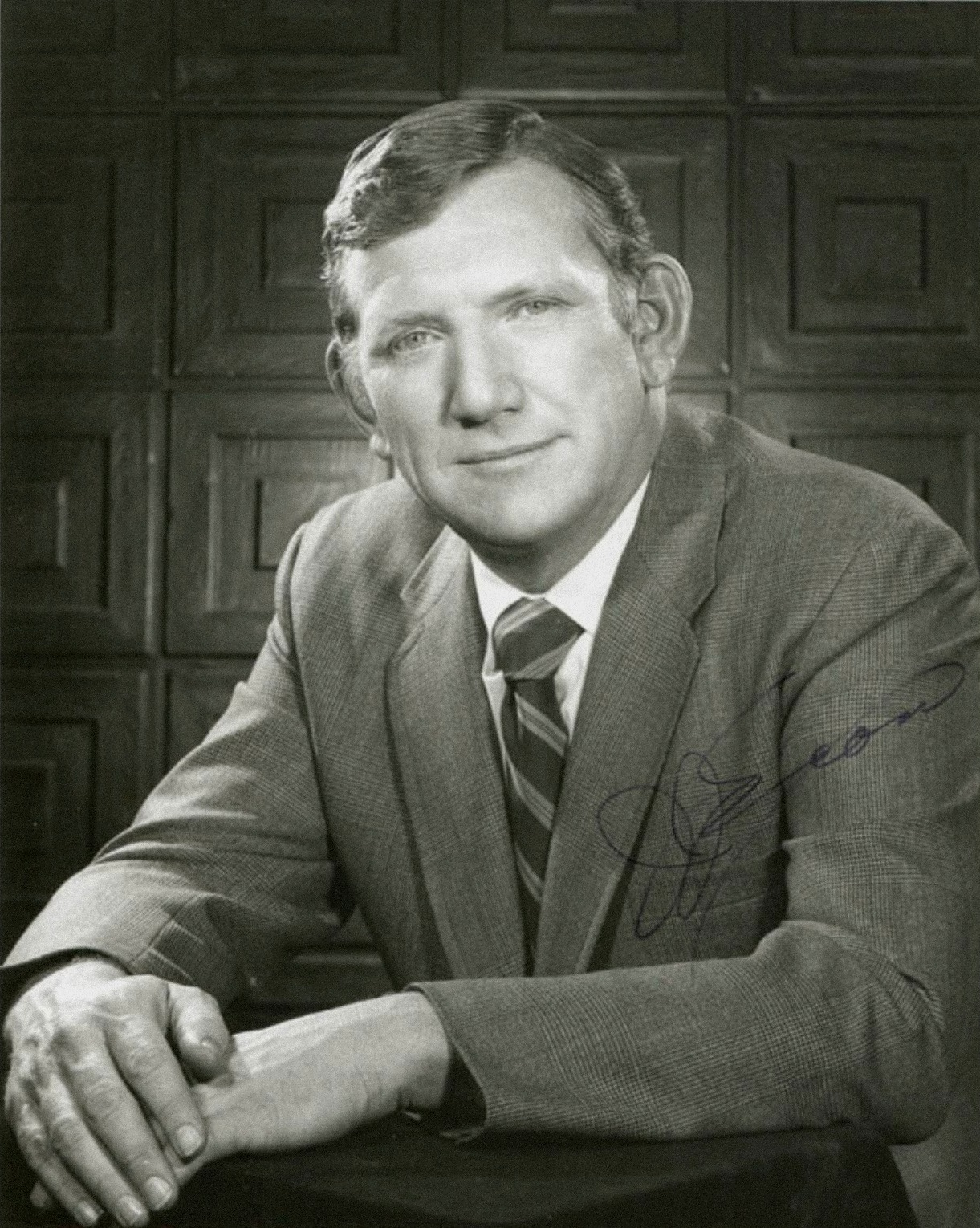

Nominee	J. James Exon	Nancy Hoch
Party	Democratic	Republican
Popular vote	332,117	307,147
Percentage	51.9%	48.0%
- County results Exon: 50–60% 60–70% Hoch: 50–60% 60–70% 70–80%
U.S. senator before election
J. James Exon
Democratic
Elected U.S. Senator
J. James Exon
Democratic

Incumbent Democrat J. James Exon won re-election to a second term over Republican businesswoman Nancy Hoch.

General election results
Party	Candidate	Votes	%	±%
Democratic	J. James Exon (Incumbent)	332,217	51.94%	−15.72%
Republican	Nancy Hoch	307,147	48.02%	+15.67%
Write-ins		304	0.05%	
Majority		25,070	3.92%	−31.40%
Turnout		639,668		
Democratic hold		Swing		

== New Hampshire ==
New Hampshire election
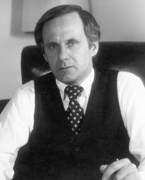

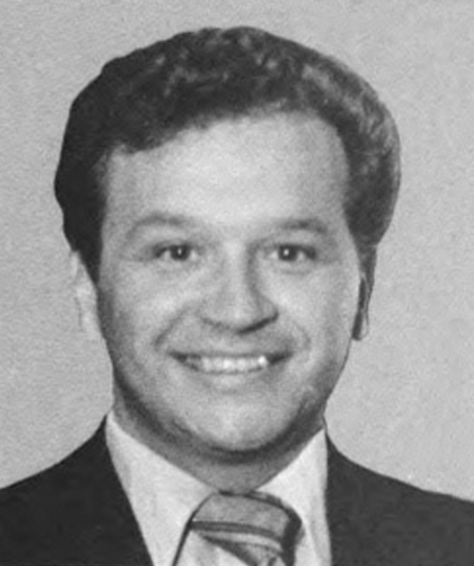
Nominee	Gordon J. Humphrey	Norman D'Amours
Party	Republican	Democratic
Popular vote	225,828	157,447
Percentage	58.75%	40.96%
- Humphrey: 50–60% 60–70% 70–80% 80–90% >90% D'Amours: 50–60% 60–70% 80–90% >90%
U.S. senator before election
Gordon J. Humphrey
Republican
Elected U.S. Senator
Gordon J. Humphrey
Republican

Incumbent Republican Gordon J. Humphrey won re-election to a second term over Democratic U.S. Representative Norman D'Amours.

1984 United States Senate election in New Hampshire
Party	Candidate	Votes	%
Republican	Gordon J. Humphrey (Incumbent)	225,828	58.75%
Democratic	Norman D'Amours	157,447	40.96%
Libertarian	Saunder H. Primack	1,094	0.28%
Majority		67,381	17.79%
Total votes		384,369	100.00%
Republican hold			

== New Jersey ==
New Jersey election
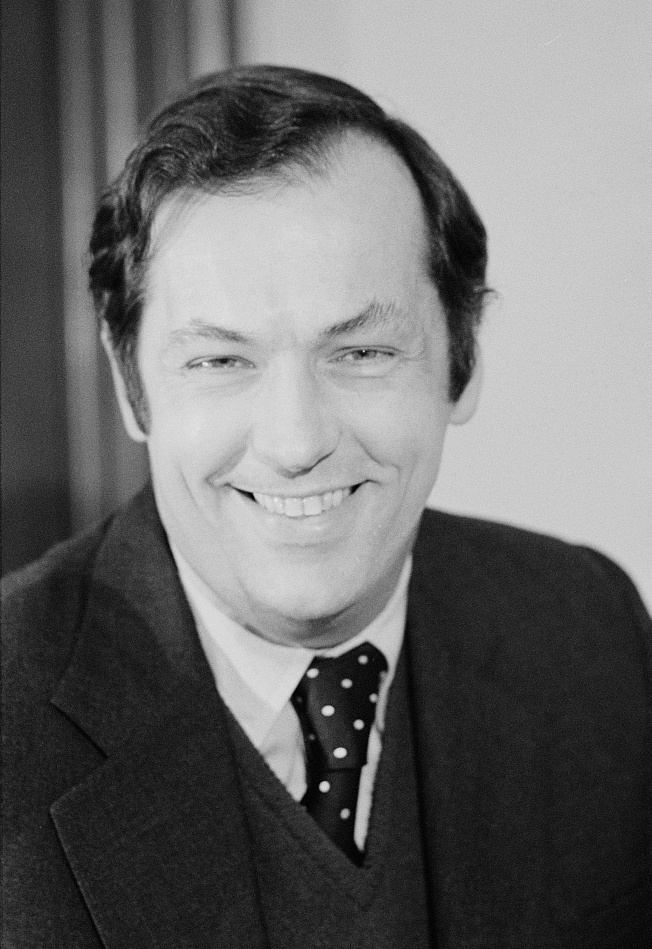

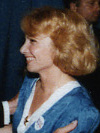
Nominee	Bill Bradley	Mary V. Mochary
Party	Democratic	Republican
Popular vote	1,986,644	1,080,100
Percentage	64.16%	34.88%
- County results Bradley: 50–60% 60–70% 70–80%
U.S. senator before election
Bill Bradley
Democratic
Elected U.S. Senator
Bill Bradley
Democratic

Incumbent Democrat Bill Bradley ran for re-election to a second term, defeating Republican Mayor of Montclair Mary V. Mochary.

1984 United States Senate election in New Jersey
Party	Candidate	Votes	%
Democratic	Bill Bradley (Incumbent)	1,986,644	64.16%
Republican	Mary V. Mochary	1,080,100	34.88%
Independent	James T. Hagen	10,409	0.34%
Libertarian	Harold F. Leiendecker	7,135	0.23%
Socialist Labor	Jules Levin	6,053	0.20%
Socialist Workers	Priscilla Schenk	3,224	0.10%
Independent	Jasper C. Gould	2,891	0.09%
Majority		906,544	29.28%
Total votes		3,096,456	100.00%
Democratic hold			

== New Mexico ==
New Mexico election
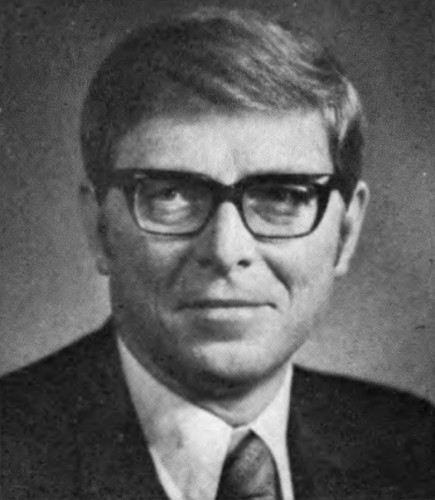

Nominee	Pete Domenici	Judith Pratt
Party	Republican	Democratic
Popular vote	361,371	141,253
Percentage	71.9%	28.1%
- County results Domenici: 50–60% 60–70% 70–80% 80–90%
U.S. senator before election
Pete Domenici
Republican
Elected U.S. Senator
Pete Domenici
Republican

Incumbent Republican Pete Domenici ran for re-election to a third term, defeating Democrat Judith Pratt.

Democratic primary results
Party	Candidate	Votes	%
Democratic	Judith Pratt	67,722	45.50%
Democratic	Nick Franklin	56,434	37.91%
Democratic	Anselmo A. Chavez	24,694	16.59%
Majority		11,288	7.58%
Total votes		148,850	100.00%

General election results
Party	Candidate	Votes	%
Republican	Pete Domenici (Incumbent)	361,371	71.90%
Democratic	Judith Pratt	141,253	28.10%
N/A	Others	10	0.00%
Majority		220,118	43.79%
Total votes		502,634	100.00%
Republican hold			

== North Carolina ==
North Carolina election
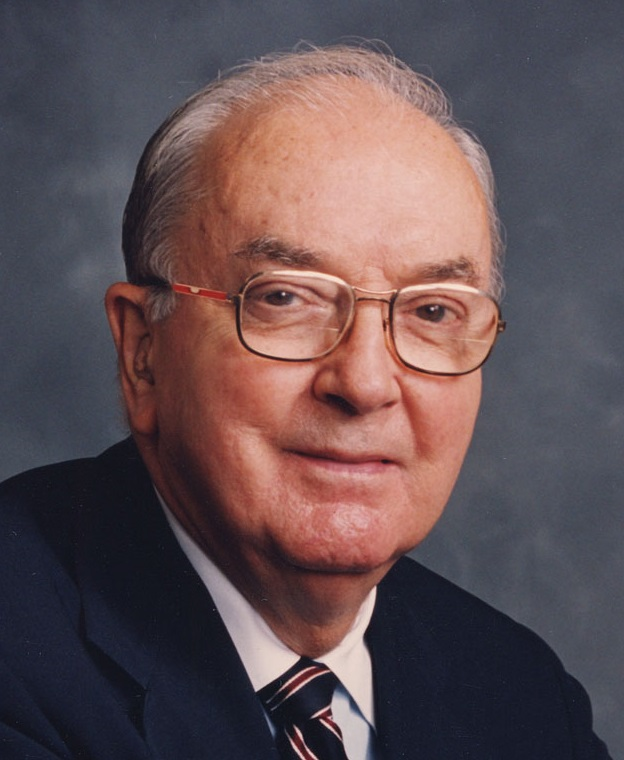

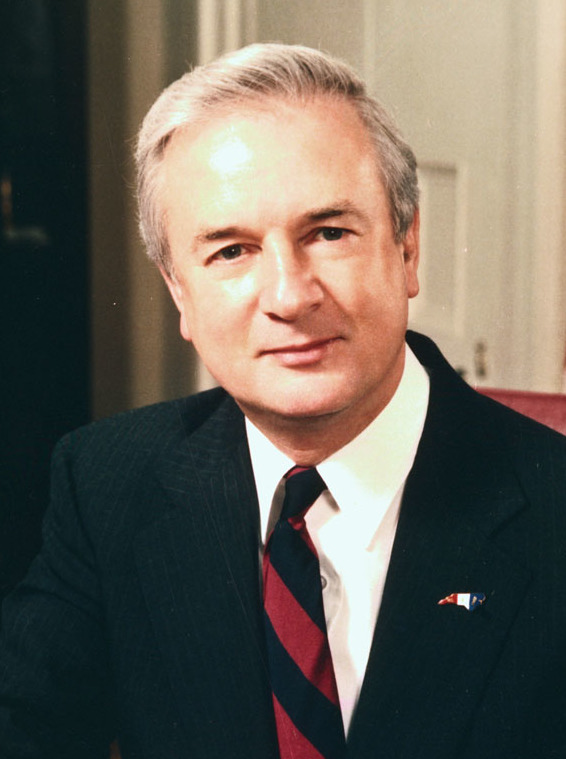
Nominee	Jesse Helms	Jim Hunt
Party	Republican	Democratic
Popular vote	1,156,768	1,070,488
Percentage	51.7%	47.8%
- County results Helms: 50– 60% 60–70% 70–80% Hunt: 40–50% 50–60% 60–70%
U.S. senator before election
Jesse Helms
Republican
Elected U.S. Senator
Jesse Helms
Republican

The election was fought between the Republican incumbent Jesse Helms and Democratic Governor Jim Hunt. Helms won the election, the most expensive non-presidential election in United States history up to that point, by a margin significantly reduced from that that Helms achieved in 1978.

1984 North Carolina U.S. Senate Republican primary election
Party	Candidate	Votes	%
Republican	Jesse Helms	134,675	90.65%
Republican	George Wimbish	13,799	9.35%
Turnout		148,574	

1984 North Carolina U.S. Senate Democratic primary election
Party	Candidate	Votes	%
Democratic	Jim Hunt	655,429	77.48%
Democratic	Thomas Allred	126,841	14.99%
Democratic	Harrill Jones	63,676	7.53%
Turnout		845,946	

Hunt had a commanding lead in opinion polls for much of the campaign, with one poll in 1983 putting him nineteen points clear of Helms. However, that was changed by the most bitterly contested election in the country that year. Hunt ran a campaign ad connecting Helms to death squads in El Salvador through his association with the Nationalist Republican Alliance, for whom Roberto d'Aubuisson had recently run for the President of El Salvador. In the short time before election day, however, the highly popular incumbent US President Ronald Reagan gave Helms a significant boost by campaigning for him and running a local TV ad praising Helms and asking registered voters in North Carolina to re-elect him.

The election cost a total of $26,379,483 in total reported spending (over twelve times as much as the 1980 race), of which, 64% ($16.9m) was spent by Helms.

1984 North Carolina U.S. Senate election
Party	Candidate	Votes	%
Republican	Jesse Helms (Incumbent)	1,156,768	51.7%
Democratic	Jim Hunt	1,070,488	47.8%
Libertarian	Bobby Emory	9,302	0.4%
Socialist Workers	Kate Daher	2,493	0.1%
Turnout		2,239,051	
Majority		86,280	3.9%
Republican hold			

Voters Education Project (VEP) in Atlanta study showed that Helms received 63 percent of the white vote and was particularly successful in small towns and rural areas, while receiving less than 1 percent of the black vote in 35 almost-all-black precincts. "Hunt got 37 percent of the white and 98.8 percent of the black vote, according to VEP. But only 61 percent of registered blacks voted, down from 63 percent in 1980." While, It had among the lowest industrial wages in the United States and was third in terms of mobile homes.

== Oklahoma ==
Incumbent Democrat David Boren won re-election to a second term.

Oklahoma election
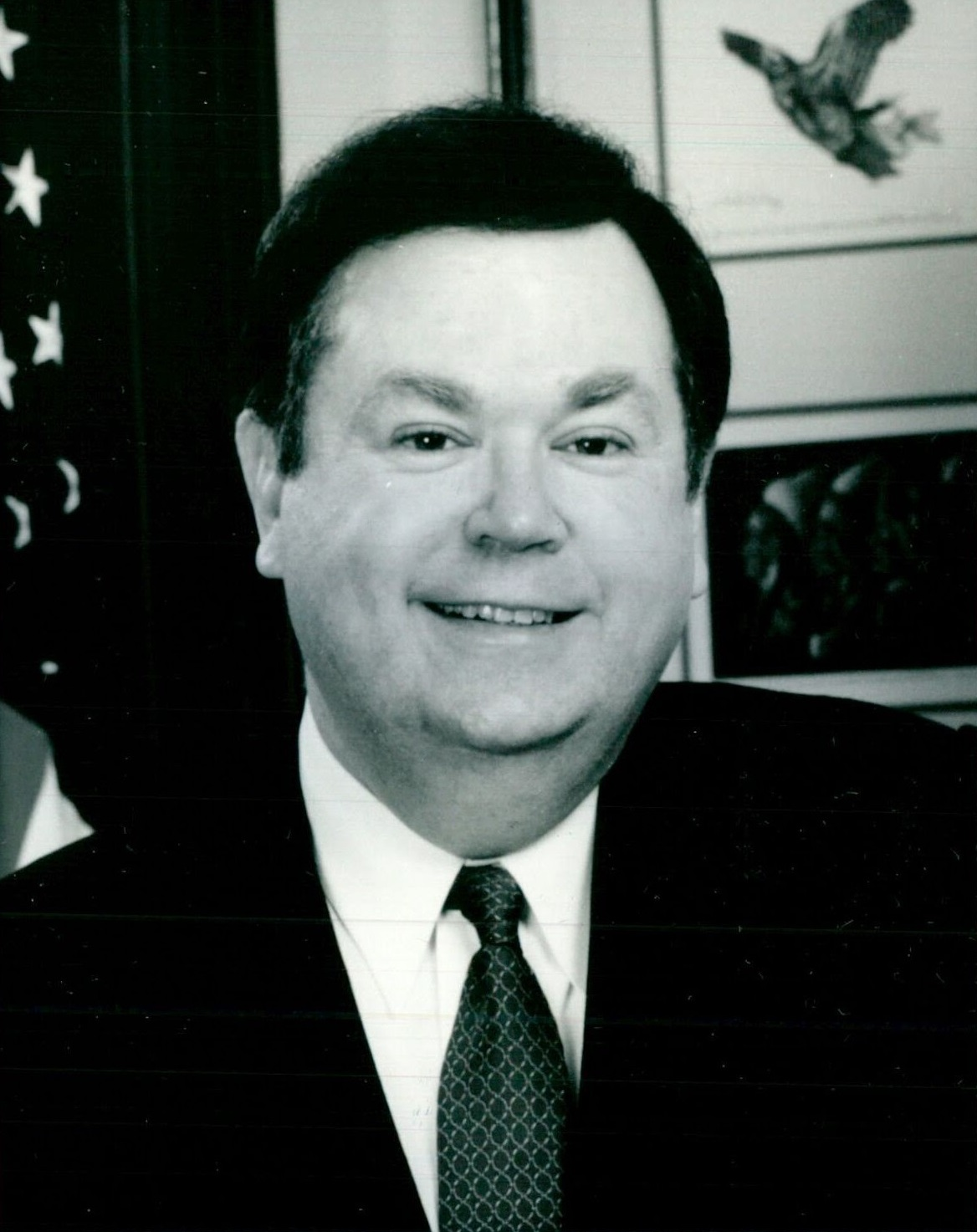

Nominee	David Boren	Will E. Bill Crozier
Party	Democratic	Republican
Popular vote	906,131	280,638
Percentage	75.6%	23.4%
- County results Boren: 60–70% 70–80% 80–90% >90%
U.S. senator before election
David Boren
Democratic
Elected U.S. Senator
David Boren
Democratic

Oklahoma general election
Party	Candidate	Votes	%
Democratic	David Boren (Incumbent)	906,131	75.6%
Republican	Will E. Bill Crozier	280,638	23.4%
Libertarian	Robert T. Murphy	11,168	0.9%
Majority		625,493	52.2%
Total votes		1,197,937	100.00%
Democratic hold			

== Oregon ==
Oregon election
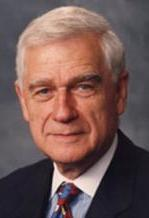

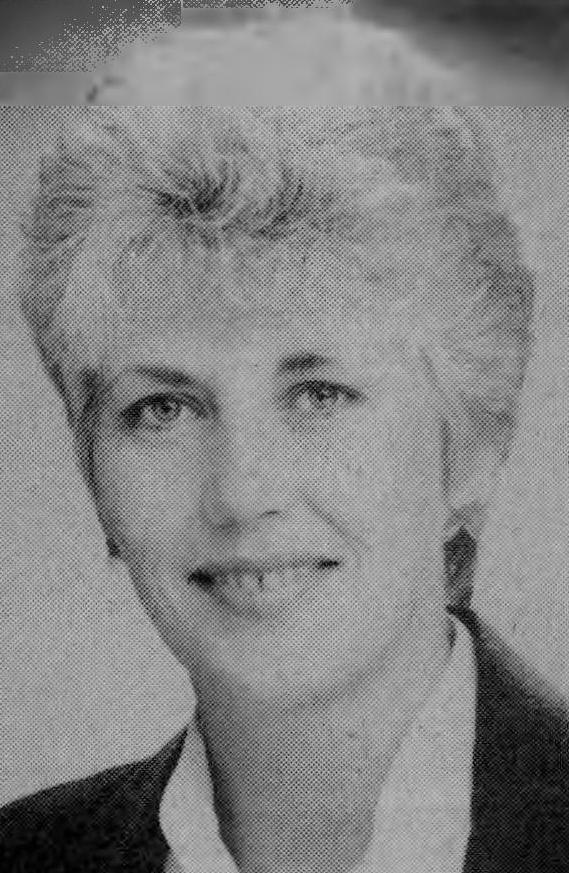
Nominee	Mark Hatfield	Margie Hendriksen
Party	Republican	Democratic
Popular vote	808,152	406,112
Percentage	66.56%	33.45%
- County results Hatfield: 60–70% 70–80%
U.S. senator before election
Mark Hatfield
Republican
Elected U.S. Senator
Mark Hatfield
Republican

Incumbent Republican Mark Hatfield sought re-election, defeating Democratic State Senator Margie Hendricksen.

1984 United States Senate election in Oregon
Party	Candidate	Votes	%
Republican	Mark Hatfield (Incumbent)	808,152	66.53%
Democratic	Margie Hendricksen	406,122	33.43%
Independent Republican	Ralph H. Preston	461	0.04%
Majority		402,030	33.10%
Total votes		1,214,735	100.00%
Republican hold			

== Rhode Island ==
Rhode Island election
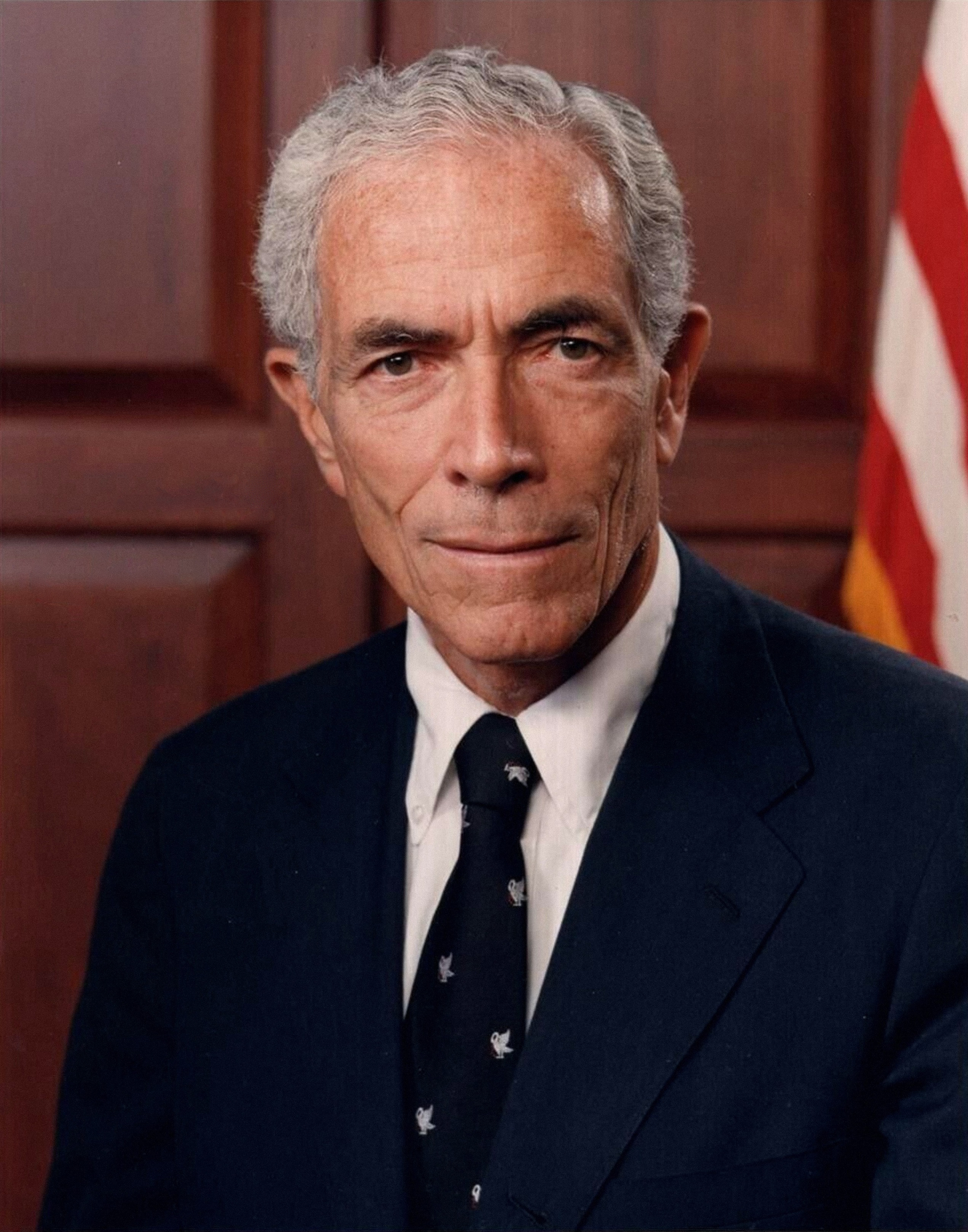

Nominee	Claiborne Pell	Barbara Leonard
Party	Democratic	Republican
Popular vote	285,811	107,545
Percentage	72.7%	27.3%
- Pell: 50–60% 60–70% 70–80% 80–90%
U.S. senator before election
Claiborne Pell
Democratic
Elected U.S. Senator
Claiborne Pell
Democratic

Incumbent Democrat Claiborne Pell sought re-election, defeating Republican Barbara M. Leonard.

General election results
Party	Candidate	Votes	%
Democratic	Claiborne Pell (Incumbent)	285,811	72.66%
Republican	Barbara Leonard	107,545	27.34%
Majority		178,266	45.32%
Total votes		393,356	100.00%
Democratic hold			

== South Carolina ==
South Carolina election
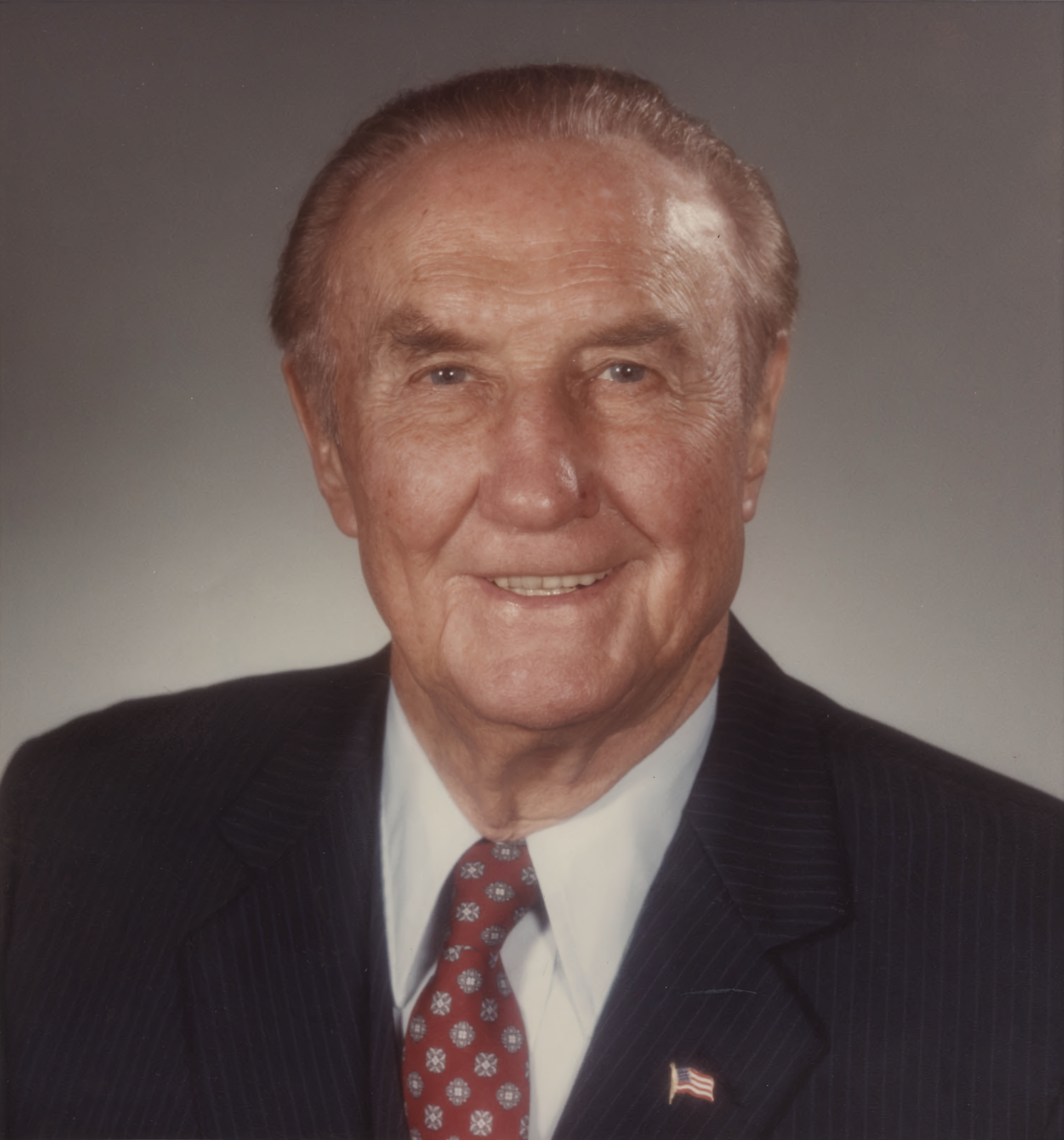

Nominee	Strom Thurmond	Melvin Purvis
Party	Republican	Democratic
Popular vote	644,814	306,982
Percentage	66.8%	31.8%
- County results Thurmond: 40–50% 50–60% 60–70% 70–80% 80–90% Purvis: 40–50%
U.S. senator before election
Strom Thurmond
Republican
Elected U.S. Senator
Strom Thurmond
Republican

Popular incumbent Republican Strom Thurmond cruised to re-election against Democratic challenger Melvin Purvis. Melvin Purvis, a white minister and the son of famous FBI agent Melvin Purvis, won a close race against black photographer Cecil J. Williams. The closeness of the race and the fact that the black candidate did not win propelled Jesse Jackson to request a Justice Department investigation into the primary and he also considered an independent bid for the seat. Governor Richard Riley and 3rd district Representative Butler Derrick flirted with running, but backed down when Thurmond received endorsements from prominent Democrats in South Carolina.

Democratic Primary
Candidate	Votes	%
Melvin Purvis	149,730	50.2%
Cecil J. Williams	148,586	49.8%

Senator Strom Thurmond easily defeated Robert Cunningham to advance to the general election.

Republican Primary
Candidate	Votes	%
Strom Thurmond	44,662	94.3%
Robert H. Cunningham	2,693	5.7%

Thurmond received endorsements from former Democratic governor Robert Evander McNair, Charleston mayor Joseph P. Riley Jr., and an assortment of black mayors in the state. He did not face a serious challenge and spent almost $1.5 million on the race whereas Purvis spent less than $10,000. An ironic footnote to the election is the fact that Purvis used Thurmond's age as an issue in the campaign. He claimed Thurmond was too old, yet Purvis died less than two years after the election of a heart attack at age 46.

South Carolina U.S. Senate Election, 1984
Party	Candidate	Votes	%	±%
Republican	Strom Thurmond (Incumbent)	644,814	66.8%	+11.2%
Democratic	Melvin Purvis	306,982	31.8%	−12.6%
Libertarian	Stephen Davis	13,323	1.4%	+1.4%
No party	Write-Ins	335	0.0%	0.0%
Majority		337,832	35.0%	+23.8%
Turnout		965,454	68.7%	+11.0%
Republican hold				

== South Dakota ==
South Dakota election
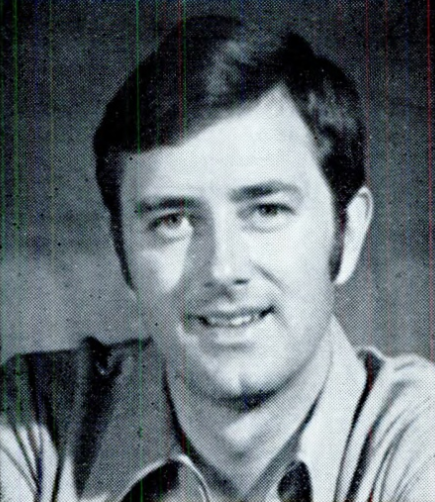

Nominee	Larry Pressler	George V. Cunningham
Party	Republican	Democratic
Popular vote	235,176	80,537
Percentage	74.49%	25.51%
- County Results; Pressler: 50-60% 60-70% 70-80% 80–90% >90% Cunningham: 50–60%
U.S. senator before election
Larry Pressler
Republican
Elected U.S. Senator
Larry Pressler
Republican

Incumbent Republican Larry Pressler won re-election for a second term, defeating Democrat George V. Cunningham.

1984 United States Senate election in South Dakota
Party	Candidate	Votes	%
Republican	Larry Pressler (Incumbent)	235,176	74.49%
Democratic	George V. Cunningham	80,537	25.51%
Majority		154,639	43.79%
Total votes		315,713	100.00%
Republican hold			

== Tennessee ==
Tennessee election
- November 6, 1984
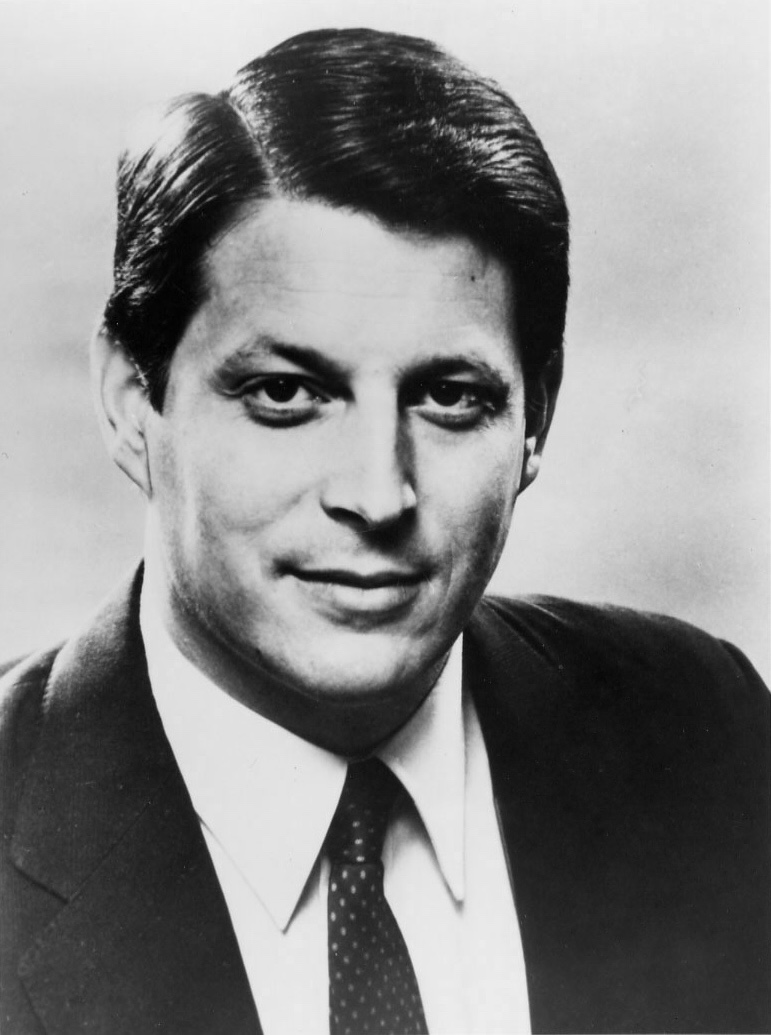

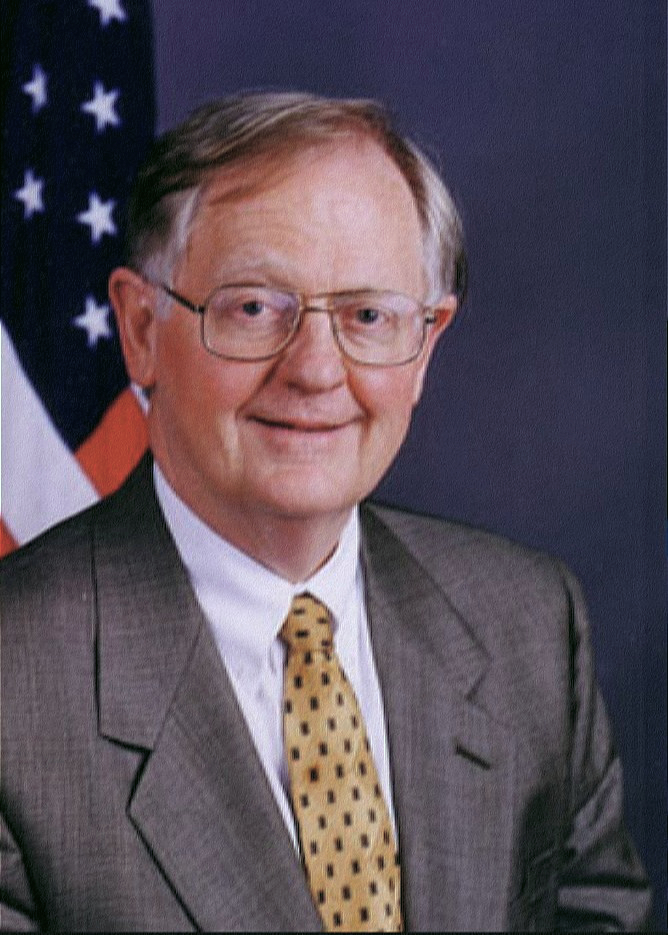

Nominee	Al Gore	Victor Ashe	Ed McAteer
Party	Democratic	Republican	Independent
Popular vote	1,000,607	557,016	87,234
Percentage	60.72%	33.80%	5.29%
- County results Gore: 50–60% 60–70% 70–80% 80–90% Ashe: 50–60% 60–70% 70–80%
U.S. senator before election
Howard Baker
Republican
Elected U.S. Senator
Al Gore
Democratic

Three-term popular incumbent Howard Baker, who had served as United States Senate Majority Leader since 1981 (Minority Leader from 1977 to 1981) decided not to seek re-election in order to concentrate on a planned bid for the 1988 Republican presidential nomination (which did not happen, as he later accepted a White House Chief of Staff position under President Ronald Reagan). This made a seat open.

Democrats nominated Representative and future Vice President of the United States Al Gore, whose father Albert Gore, Sr. once held the other Tennessee Senate seat.

Democratic primary results
Party	Candidate	Votes	%
Democratic	Al Gore	476,582	100.00%
Total votes		476,582	100.00%

In the Republican primary, held on August 2, state Senator Victor Ashe easily emerged as a winner.

Republican primary results
Party	Candidate	Votes	%
Republican	Victor Ashe	145,744	86.47%
Republican	Jack McNeil	17,970	10.66%
Republican	Herbert David Patty	4,777	2.83%
Republican	Write-in	49	0.03%
Total votes		168,540	100%

Although the Senate election coincided with the landslide re-election of President Reagan, who carried Tennessee by a wide margin, this time his victory did not have any coattails, as it did in 1980, and Democrats picked up three Republican seats. One of the Democratic gains was in Tennessee, where moderate democrat Gore won in a landslide:

General election results
Party	Candidate	Votes	%
Democratic	Al Gore	1,000,607	60.72%
Republican	Victor Ashe	557,016	33.80%
Independent	Ed McAteer	87,234	5.29%
Independent	Khalil-Ullah Al-Muhaymin	3,179	0.19%
Turnout		1,640,836	
Majority		443,591	26.92%
Democratic gain from Republican			

== Texas ==
Texas election
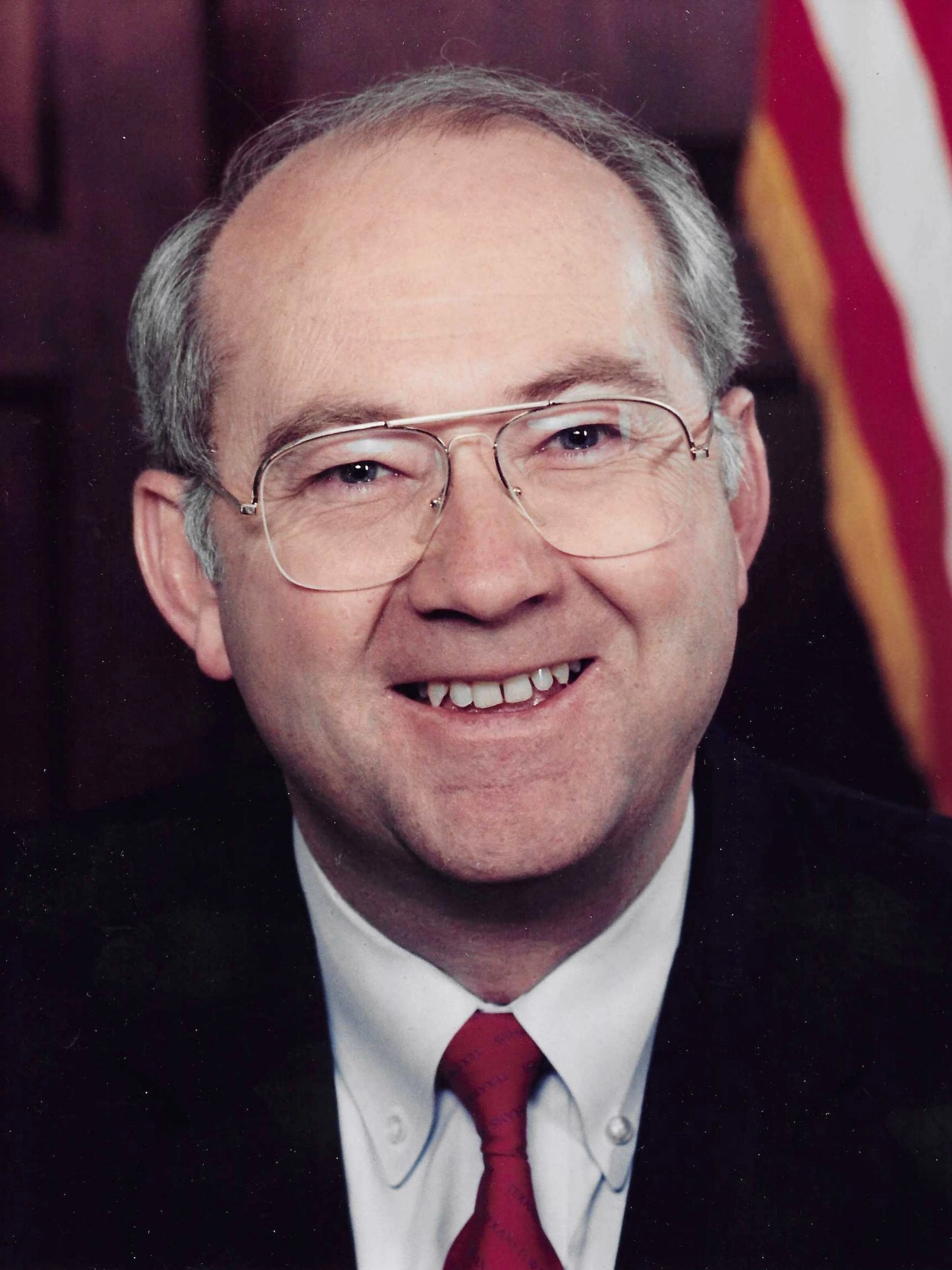

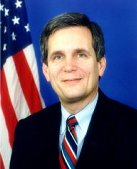
Nominee	Phil Gramm	Lloyd Doggett
Party	Republican	Democratic
Popular vote	3,111,348	2,202,557
Percentage	58.6%	41.4%
- County results Gramm: 50–60% 60–70% 70–80% 80–90% Doggett: 50–60% 60–70% 70–80% 80–90%
U.S. senator before election
John G. Tower
Republican
Elected U.S. Senator
Phil Gramm
Republican

Incumbent Republican John G. Tower decided to retire, instead of seeking a fifth term. Republican Phil Gramm won the open seat over Democratic State Senator Lloyd Doggett.

The Democratic primary was 45% Hispanic, but included many moderate to conservative voters. Hance positioned himself as the most moderate to conservative candidate, who co-sponsored President Ronald Reagan's tax package. Doggett was the more liberal candidate, attacking Reaganomics and getting endorsements from the Texas teachers' union and Agriculture Commissioner Jim Hightower. Krueger was seen as the front runner and was a moderate who supported the state's oil and gas industry, but had close ties with the Hispanic community because he was Spanish-speaking. Hance attacked both Kroeger and Doggett for supporting amnesty for illegal aliens and supporting gay rights. The initial primary was extremely close between the top three candidates. Each candidate got 31% of the electorate. Hance ranked first, only 273 votes ahead of Doggett and 1,560 votes ahead of Krueger.

Since no candidate passed the 50% threshold, Hance and Doggett qualified for the run-off election. Hance fired his pollster despite ranking first. Krueger endorsed fellow U.S. Congressman Hance, saying "Ultimately, the quality of one's public service depends upon the character that one displays in filling an office." In the June election, Doggett very narrowly defeated Hance by just 1,345 votes.

Initial election on May 5, 1984

May Democratic primary
Party	Candidate	Votes	%
Democratic	Kent Hance	456,446	31.2%
Democratic	Lloyd Doggett	456,173	31.2%
Democratic	Bob Krueger	454,886	31.1%
Democratic	David Young	47,062	3.2%
Democratic	Robert S. Sullivan	34,733	2.4%
Democratic	Harley Schlanger	14,149	1.0%

Run-off election on June 2, 1984

June Democratic primary
Party	Candidate	Votes	%
Democratic	Lloyd Doggett	491,251	50.1%
Democratic	Kent Hance	489,906	49.9%

The Republican primary was a highly competitive, multimillion-dollar contest. Gramm recently switched parties in 1983, but he was a conservative who supported Reaganomics. Gramm spent $4 million.

May Republican primary
Party	Candidate	Votes	%
Republican	Phil Gramm	247,280	73.3%
Republican	Ron Paul	55,771	16.5%
Republican	Robert Mosbacher Jr.	26,250	7.8%
Republican	Hank Grover	8,055	2.5%

General election results
Party	Candidate	Votes	%
Republican	Phil Gramm	3,111,348	58.6%
Democratic	Lloyd Doggett	2,202,557	41.4%
Turnout		5,313,905	
Majority		908,791	17.2%
Republican hold			

== Virginia ==
Virginia election
- Turnout: 52.4% (voting eligible)
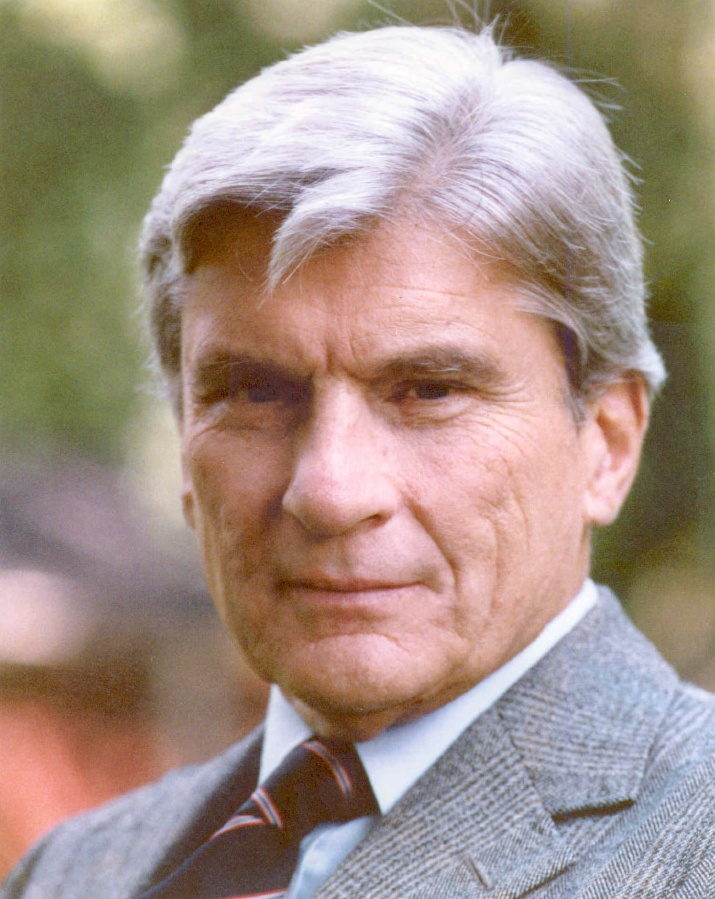

Nominee	John Warner	Edythe Harrison
Party	Republican	Democratic
Popular vote	1,406,194	601,142
Percentage	70.0%	29.9%
- County and independent city results Warner: 50–60% 60–70% 70–80% 80–90% Harrison: 50–60%
U.S. senator before election
John Warner
Republican
Elected U.S. Senator
John Warner
Republican

Incumbent Republican John W. Warner won re-election to a second term. He handily defeated Edythe C. Harrison, member of the Virginia House of Delegates the "first woman in Virginia nominated by the Democratic Party for statewide office."

Virginia general election
Party	Candidate	Votes	%	±%
Republican	John Warner (Incumbent)	1,406,194	70.05%	+19.88%
Democratic	Edythe C. Harrison	601,142	29.95%	−19.84%
Write-ins		151	0.01%	−0.03%
Majority		805,052	40.10%	+39.71%
Turnout		2,007,487		
Republican hold				

== West Virginia ==
West Virginia election
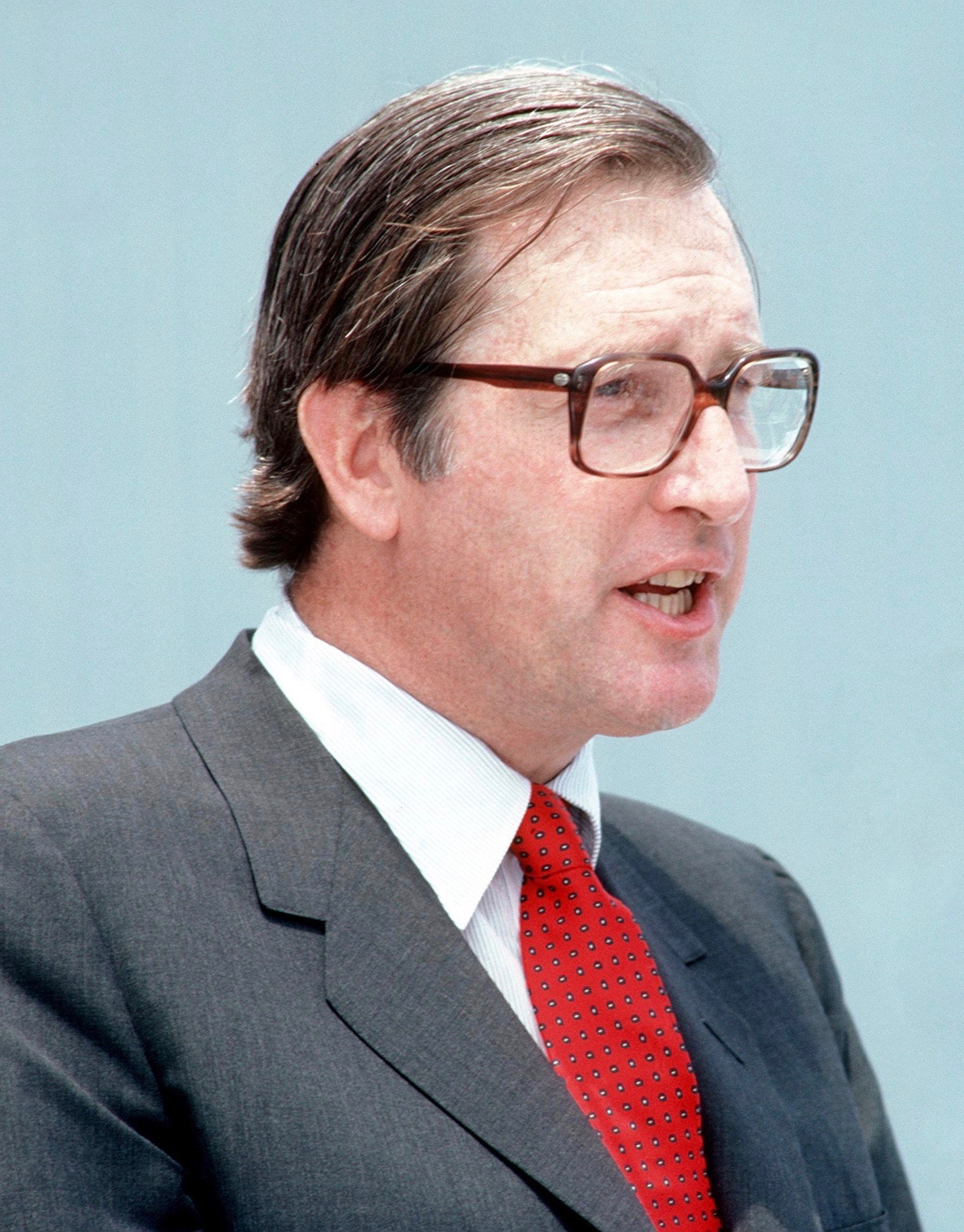

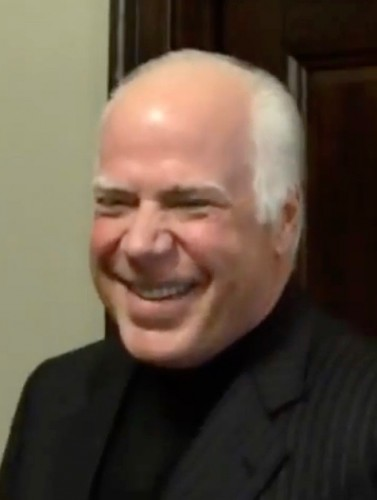
Nominee	Jay Rockefeller	John Raese
Party	Democratic	Republican
Popular vote	374,233	344,680
Percentage	51.82%	47.73%
- County results Rockefeller: 40–50% 50–60% 60–70% 70–80% Raese: 50–60% 60–70% 70-80%
U.S. senator before election
Jennings Randolph
Democratic
Elected U.S. Senator
Jay Rockefeller
Democratic

Incumbent Democratic Jennings Randolph decided to retire, instead of seeking a fifth term. Democrat Jay Rockefeller won the open seat over Republican John Raese.

1984 United States Senate election in West Virginia
Party	Candidate	Votes	%
Democratic	Jay Rockefeller	374,233	51.82%
Republican	John Raese	344,680	47.73%
Socialist Workers	Mary E. 'Joan' Radin	3,299	0.46%
Majority		29,553	3.09%
Total votes		722,212	100.00%
Democratic hold			

== Wyoming ==
Wyoming election
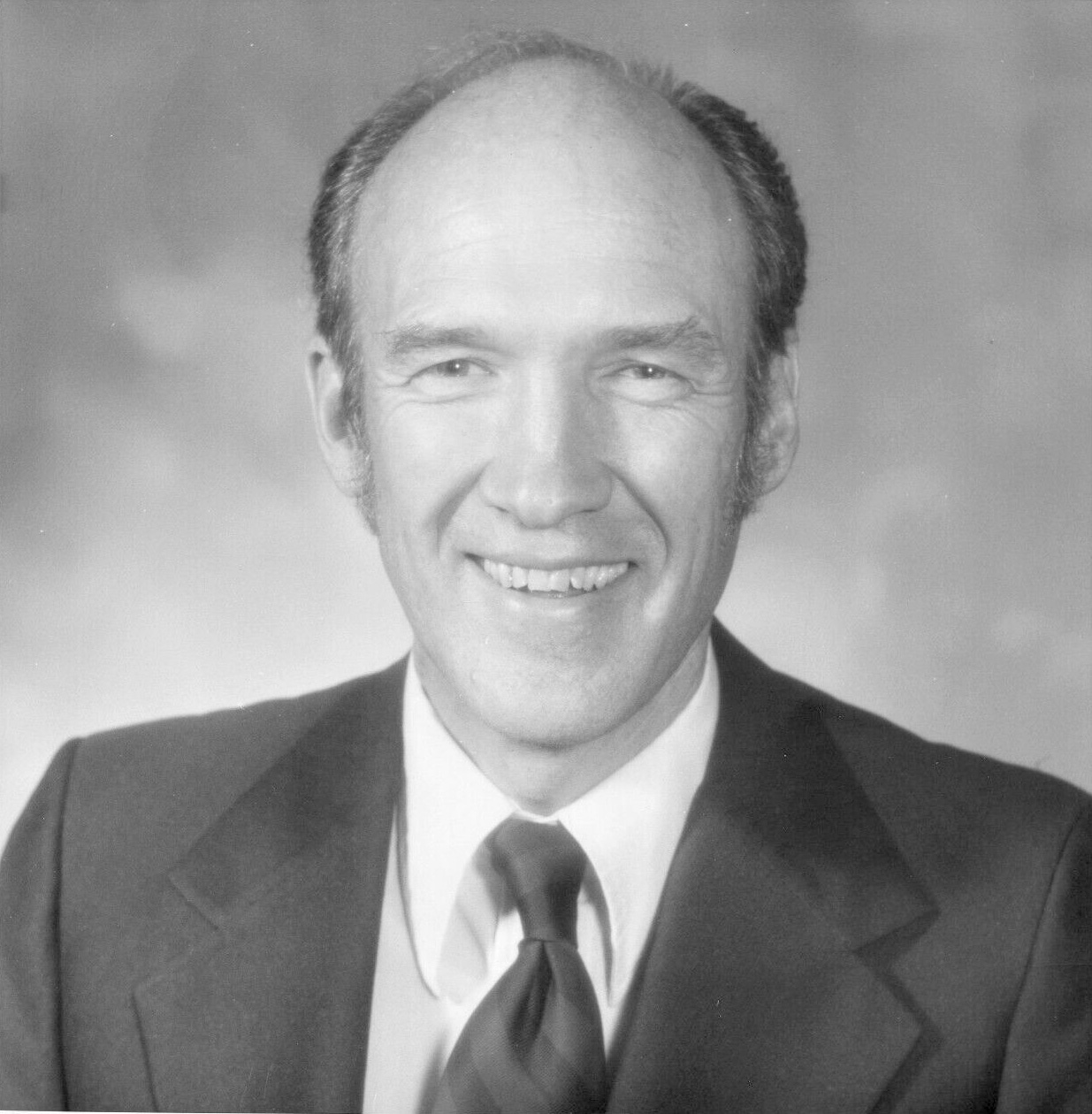

Nominee	Alan Simpson	Victor Ryan
Party	Republican	Democratic
Popular vote	146,373	40,525
Percentage	78.32%	21.68%
- County Results; Simpson: 60-70% 70-80% 80–90%
U.S. senator before election
Alan Simpson
Republican
Elected U.S. Senator
Alan Simpson
Republican

Incumbent Republican Alan K. Simpson won re-election for a second term, defeating Democrat Victor A. Ryan.

1984 United States Senate election in Wyoming
Party	Candidate	Votes	%
Republican	Alan K. Simpson (Incumbent)	146,373	78.32%
Democratic	Victor A. Ryan	40,525	21.68%
Majority		105,848	43.79%
Total votes		186,898	100.00%
Republican hold			

== See also ==
- 1984 United States elections
  - 1984 United States gubernatorial elections
  - 1984 United States presidential election
  - 1984 United States House of Representatives elections
- 98th United States Congress
- 99th United States Congress

== Sources ==
- Barone, Michael; Ujifusa, Grant (1985). The Almanac of American Politics 1986: The Senators, the Representatives and the Governors: Their Records and Election Results, Their States and Districts.
- Snider, William D. (1985). Helms and Hunt: The North Carolina Senate Race, 1984. University of North Carolina Press.
- State Election Commission (1985). Report of the South Carolina State Election Commission 1984-1985. Columbia, SC: State Election Commission. p. 62.
- Bass, Jack; Marilyn W. Thompson (1998). Ol' Strom: An Unauthorized Biography of Strom Thurmond. Longstreet. p. 302.
