= 1984 United States Senate election in Idaho =

- November 6, 1984
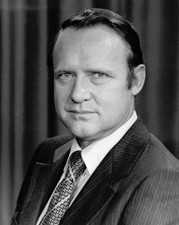

Nominee	Jim McClure	Pete Busch
Party	Republican	Democratic
Popular vote	293,193	105,591
Percentage	72.19%	26.00%
- County results McClure: 50–60% 60–70% 70–80% 80–90% >90%
U.S. senator before election
Jim McClure
Republican
Elected U.S. Senator
Jim McClure
Republican

The 1984 United States Senate election in Idaho was held on November 6. Incumbent Senator Jim McClure was re-elected to a third term in office.

== Republican primary ==
=== Candidates ===
- Jim McClure, incumbent Senator

=== Results ===
Senator McClure was unopposed for re-nomination by the Republican Party.

== Democratic primary ==
=== Candidates ===
- Pete Busch, retired military officer, Vietnam War veteran
- Louis Hatheway, heavy equipment operator and real estate broker

=== Results ===
1984 Democratic U.S. Senate primary
Party	Candidate	Votes	%
Democratic	Pete Busch	27,871	62.02%
Democratic	Louis Hatheway	17,065	37.98%
Total votes		44,936	100.00%

- Primary held on May 22

== Independents and third parties ==
=== Libertarian ===
- Donald Billings

== General election ==
=== Campaign ===
The campaign was largely uneventful given McClure's large lead in polls and the Republican tendency of Idaho.

During the campaign, Pete Busch was involved in a minor plane crash. Two years later in April 1986, Busch and his wife died in a similar crash while running for Congress.

=== Results ===
General election results
Party	Candidate	Votes	%	±%
Republican	Jim McClure (incumbent)	293,193	72.19%	▲3.75
Democratic	Pete Busch	105,591	26.00%	▼5.56
Libertarian	Donald Billings	7,384	1.82%	▲1.82
Total votes		406,168	100.00%	
Republican hold		Swing		

== See also ==
- 1984 United States Senate elections
