= Jim McClure (politician) =

American politician and lawyer

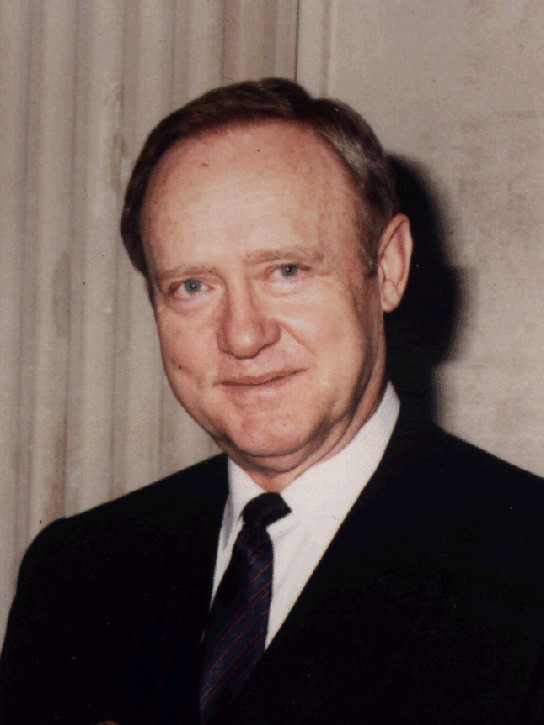

Chair of the Senate Energy Committee
- In office January 3, 1981 – January 3, 1987
- Preceded by: Scoop Jackson
- Succeeded by: Bennett Johnston

United States Senator from Idaho
- In office January 3, 1973 – January 3, 1991
- Preceded by: Len Jordan
- Succeeded by: Larry Craig

Member of the U.S. House of Representatives from Idaho's 1st district
- In office January 3, 1967 – January 3, 1973
- Preceded by: Compton I. White Jr.
- Succeeded by: Steve Symms

Personal details
- Born: James Albertus McClure; December 27, 1924 Payette, Idaho, U.S.
- Died: February 26, 2011 (aged 86) Garden City, Idaho, U.S.
- Party: Republican
- Spouse: Louise Miller (1950–2011)
- Children: 3
- Education: Idaho State University (BA); University of Idaho (JD)

Military service
- Allegiance: United States
- Branch/service: United States Navy
- Years of service: 1942–1946
- Battles/wars: World War II
- McClure's voice McClure's opening statement on the first day of the Iran–Contra hearings Recorded May 5, 1987

James Albertus McClure (December 27, 1924 – February 26, 2011) was an American lawyer and politician from the state of Idaho, most notably serving as a Republican in the U.S. Senate for three terms from 1973 to 1991. He also served three terms in the U.S. House of Representatives from 1967 to 1973.

== Early life and education ==
McClure attended public schools in Payette and joined the U.S. Navy at age 18 during World War II, serving from 1942 to 1946. McClure graduated from the Navy Program at the University of Idaho–Southern Branch (now Idaho State University) in Pocatello in 1943. After his discharge from the Navy, he entered the College of Law at the University of Idaho and graduated in 1950.

== Career ==
From 1950 to 1956, he served as prosecuting attorney for Payette County; he also served as city attorney for Payette from 1953 to 1966. During this span, he was also a member of the Idaho State Senate, serving from 1961 to 1966.

In the 1966 election, McClure ran for the U.S. House from Idaho's first congressional district, which had been held by Democrats since 1953. He defeated two-term incumbent Compton I. White, Jr. and was re-elected in 1968 and 1970.

=== U.S. Senate ===
McClure ran for the open U.S. Senate seat (Class II) in 1972, vacated by the retirement of Len Jordan. In the general election, he defeated Democrat William E. "Bud" Davis, the president of Idaho State University. McClure was reelected by wide margins in 1978 and 1984. The seat was occupied by William Borah for over three decades (1907–1940), and has been continuously held by Republicans since 1949.

During his 18 years in the Senate, McClure served as the chairman of the Committee on Energy and Natural Resources from 1981 to 1987. In this capacity McClure emerged as an early proponent of electric cars and energy independence. He also chaired the Senate Republican Conference from 1981 to 1985.

=== Retirement ===
At age 65, McClure declined to run for a fourth term in 1990. Republican congressman Larry Craig of Midvale easily won McClure's Senate seat in November 1990, served three terms, and was succeeded by Jim Risch.

After leaving the Senate, McClure became a mining consultant and lobbyist in Washington, D.C., founding the firm of McClure, Gerard, & Neuenschwander. Up until his death, McClure maintained a residence in McCall.

In October 1995, the new home of the College of Mines and Earth Resources at the University of Idaho was dedicated as James A. McClure Hall. On December 12, 2001, the Federal Building and U.S. Courthouse in Boise was renamed for McClure.

== Personal life ==
He was married to Louise Miller. In December 2008, 83-year-old McClure suffered a stroke and was sent to the intensive care unit at Saint Alphonsus Regional Medical Center in Boise. Although initially expected to recover, his health declined after additional strokes and he died from complications at his home in Garden City on February 26, 2011.

== Election results ==
U.S. House elections (Idaho's 1st district): Results 1966–1970
Year	Democrat	Votes	Pct	Republican	Votes	Pct
1966	Compton White, Jr. (inc.)	65,446	48.2%	Jim McClure	70,410	51.8%
1968	Compton White, Jr.	62,002	40.6%	Jim McClure (inc.)	90,870	59.4%
1970	William Brauner	55,743	41.8%	Jim McClure (inc.)	77,513	58.2%

U.S. Senate elections in Idaho (Class II): Results 1972–1984
Year	Democrat	Votes	Pct	Republican	Votes	Pct	3rd Party	Party	Votes	Pct
1972	William "Bud" Davis	140,913	45.5%	Jim McClure	161,804	52.3%	Jean L. Stafford	American	6,885	2.2%
1978	Dwight Jensen	89,635	31.6%	Jim McClure (inc.)	194,412	68.4%				
1984	Pete Busch	105,591	26.0%	Jim McClure (inc.)	293,193	72.2%	David B. Billings	Libertarian	7,384	1.8%

U.S. House of Representatives
Preceded by Compton I. White Jr.	Member of the U.S. House of Representatives from Idaho's 1st congressional district 1967–1973	Succeeded by Steve Symms
U.S. Senate
Preceded by Len Jordan	U.S. Senator (Class 2) from Idaho; 1973–1991; Served alongside: Frank Church, Steve Symms	Succeeded by Larry Craig
Preceded by Henry M. Jackson	Chair of the Senate Energy Committee; 1981–1987	Succeeded by J. Bennett Johnston
Party political offices
Preceded by Len Jordan	Republican nominee for U.S. Senator from Idaho (Class 2); 1972, 1978, 1984	Succeeded by Larry Craig
Preceded by Carl Curtis	Chair of the Senate Republican Steering Committee; 1975–1981	Succeeded by Jesse Helms
Preceded by Bob Packwood	Chair of the Senate Republican Conference; 1981–1985	Succeeded by John Chafee
Preceded by Jesse Helms	Chair of the Senate Republican Steering Committee; 1985–1989	Succeeded by Malcolm Wallop
