= Peter M. Busch =

American politician

- Nickname: Pete
- Born: November 19, 1934; San Francisco, California, U.S.
- Died: April 10, 1986 (aged 51) Clark County, Idaho, U.S.
- Cause of death: Private plane crash
- Buried: Saint Gall Cemetery; Colton, Washington
- Allegiance: United States
- Branch: U.S. Marine Corps
- Service years: 195x–1976
- Rank: Lieutenant colonel
- Wars: Vietnam War
- Spouse: Charlene Ann Dupre Busch (1944–1986)
- Other work: Senatorial candidate

Peter Martin Busch (November 19, 1934 – April 10, 1986) was a U. S. Marine Corps officer and the 1984 Democratic nominee for United States Senate in Idaho.

== Biography ==
Born in 1934, Busch was a U. S. Marine Corps fighter pilot during the Vietnam War. He flew in about 400 missions during the war and was shot down once. Busch retired from the Marine Corps as a lieutenant colonel in 1976, and moved to Lewiston, Idaho.

He ran for the U.S. Senate as a Democrat in 1984 and won the May primary, but was soundly defeated by two-term Republican incumbent Jim McClure in the November election, receiving just 26% of the vote. He moved from Lewiston to Caldwell in 1985 to run for Congress in the first district against incumbent Larry Craig.

== Death ==
On April 10, 1986, Busch was piloting his private airplane, a single-engine Piper Arrow, from Coeur d'Alene to a political event in eastern Idaho at Idaho Falls. Also aboard were his wife Charlene (42) and former state senator and Democratic lieutenant governor candidate Terry Reilly (39). The weather was rainy with heavy fog patches; shortly after 8 p.m. MST, the plane crashed into a hillside in Clark County near Dubois and all three were killed instantly. After their funeral in Lewiston on April 15, Busch and his wife were buried in Colton, Washington.

Party political offices
Preceded by Dwight Jensen	Democratic Party nominee, U.S. Senator (Class 2) from Idaho; 1984 (lost)	Succeeded by Ron J. Twilegar
