= 1978 United States Senate elections =

- November 7, 1978
- Class 2

35 (Note: 33 Class 2 seats, as well as 2 each in Class 1 and Class 3 in special election) of the 100 seats in the United States Senate 51 seats needed for a majority
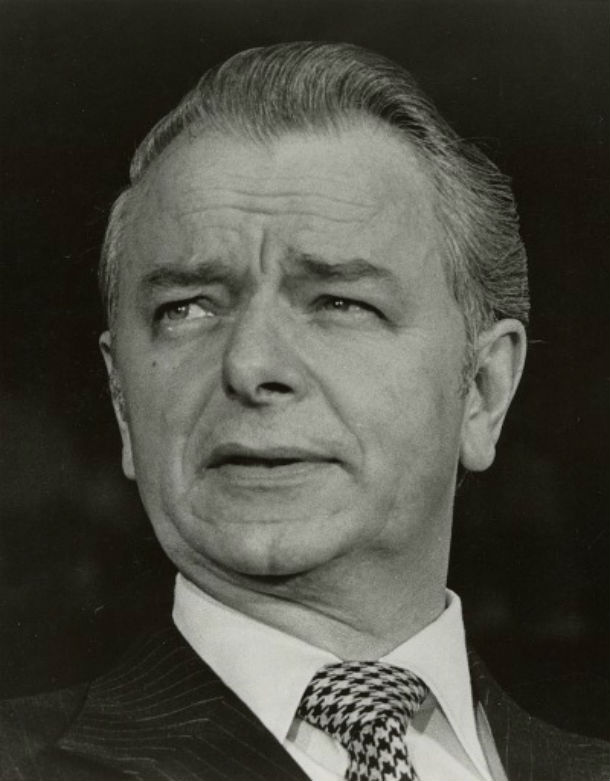

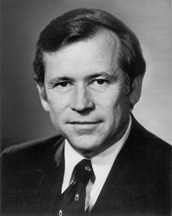
	Majority party	Minority party
Leader	Robert Byrd	Howard Baker
Party	Democratic	Republican
Leader since	January 3, 1977	January 3, 1977
Leader's seat	West Virginia	Tennessee
Seats before	61	38
Seats after	58	41
Seat change	▼3	▲3
Popular vote	15,302,929	14,794,225
Percentage	49.9%	48.2%
Seats up	18	17
Races won	15	20
	Third party
Party	Independent
Seats before	1
Seats after	1 (Note: Harry F. Byrd Jr. (VA) was an independent who caucused with the Democrats. In some circles he is called an "Independent Democrat," but his actual registration was listed as "Independent." See, e.g., United States Congress. "Harry Flood Byrd Jr. (id: B001209)". Biographical Directory of the United States Congress.)
Seat change	Steady
Seats up	0
Races won	0
- Results of the elections: Democratic gain Republican gain Democratic hold Republican hold No election Rectangular inset (Ala. & Minn.): both seats up for election
Majority Leader before election
Robert Byrd
Democratic
Elected Majority Leader
Robert Byrd
Democratic

The 1978 United States Senate elections were held on November 7, in the middle of Democratic President Jimmy Carter's term. The 33 seats of Class 2 were contested in regular elections. Special elections were also held to fill vacancies.

Thirteen seats changed hands between parties, resulting in a net gain of three seats for the Republicans allowing them to break the Democrats' filibuster-proof majority. Democrats nevertheless retained a 58–41 majority.

== Results summary ==
↓
58	1	41
Democratic	I	Republican

Parties					Total
Parties	Democratic	Republican	Independent	Other	Total
Last elections (1976) Before these elections	61	38	1	0	100
Not up	43	21	1	0	65
Up	18	17	0	—	35
Class 2 (1972→1978)	16	17	—	—	33
Special: Class 1	1	—	—	—	1
Special: Class 3	1	—	—	—	1
Incumbent retired	5 (Note: Interim appointee Muriel Humphrey of Minnesota did not seek election to finish the unexpired term and interim appointee Kaneaster Hodges Jr. of Arkansas did not seek election to a full term.)	5	—	—	10
Held by same party	2	3	—	—	5
Replaced by other party	▼2 Republicans replaced by ▲2 Democrats ▼3 Democrats replaced by ▲3 Republicans		—	—	5
Result	4	6	—	—	10
Incumbent ran	13 (Note: Allen and Hatfield lost nomination to represent Alabama and Montana, respectively.) (Note: Includes the interim appointee who ran for election.)	12 (Note: Clifford P. Case lost renomination to represent New Jersey. Jeffrey Bell became the party's new nominee.)	—	—	25
Won re-election	6	9	—	—	15
Lost re-election	▼2 Republicans replaced by ▲2 Democrats ▼5 Democrats replaced by ▲5 Republicans		—	—	7
Lost renomination, but held by same party	2	0	—	—	2
Lost renomination, and party lost	▼1 Republican replaced by ▲1 Democrat		—	—	1
Result	11	14	0	0	25
Total elected	15	20	0	0	35
Net gain/loss	▼3	▲3	Steady	Steady	3
Nationwide vote	15,302,929	14,794,225	299,624	278,078	30,674,856
Share	49.89%	48.23%	0.98%	0.91%	100%
Result	58	41	1	0	100

Source: Clerk of the United States House of Representatives

== Gains, losses, and holds ==
=== Retirements ===
Five Republicans and three Democrats retired instead of seeking re-election. One Democrat retired instead of seeking election to finish the unexpired term and one Democrat retired instead of seeking election to a full term.

State	Senator	Replaced by
Alabama (regular)	John Sparkman	Howell Heflin
Arkansas	Kaneaster Hodges Jr.	David Pryor
Kansas	James B. Pearson	Nancy Kassebaum
Minnesota (special)	Muriel Humphrey	David Durenberger
Mississippi	James Eastland	Thad Cochran
Nebraska	Carl Curtis	J. James Exon
Oklahoma	Dewey F. Bartlett	David Boren
South Dakota	James Abourezk	Larry Pressler
Virginia	William L. Scott	John Warner
Wyoming	Clifford Hansen	Alan Simpson

=== Defeats ===
Three Republicans and four Democrats sought re-election but lost in the primary or general election. One Democrat sought election to a full term but lost in the general election, one Democrat sought election to a full term but lost in the primary and one Democrat sought election to finish the unexpired term but lost in the primary.

State	Senator	Replaced by
Alabama (special)	Maryon Pittman Allen	Donald Stewart
Colorado	Floyd Haskell	William L. Armstrong
Iowa	Dick Clark	Roger Jepsen
Maine	William Hathaway	William Cohen
Massachusetts	Edward Brooke	Paul Tsongas
Michigan	Robert P. Griffin	Carl Levin
Minnesota (regular)	Wendell R. Anderson	Rudy Boschwitz
Montana	Paul G. Hatfield	Max Baucus
New Hampshire	Thomas J. McIntyre	Gordon J. Humphrey
New Jersey	Clifford P. Case	Bill Bradley

=== Post-election changes ===
One Democrat resigned on May 7, 1980, and was later replaced by Democratic appointee.

State	Senator	Replaced by
Maine (Class 1)	Edmund Muskie	George J. Mitchell

== Change in composition ==
=== Before the elections ===
D_{1}	D_{2}	D_{3}	D_{4}	D_{5}	D_{6}	D_{7}	D_{8}	D_{9}	D_{10}
D_{20}	D_{19}	D_{18}	D_{17}	D_{16}	D_{15}	D_{14}	D_{13}	D_{12}	D_{11}
D_{21}	D_{22}	D_{23}	D_{24}	D_{25}	D_{26}	D_{27}	D_{28}	D_{29}	D_{30}
D_{40}	D_{39}	D_{38}	D_{37}	D_{36}	D_{35}	D_{34}	D_{33}	D_{32}	D_{31}
D_{41}	D_{42}	D_{43}	D_{44} Ala. (reg); Ran	D_{45} Ala. (sp); Ran	D_{46} Ark. Retired	D_{47} Colo. Ran	D_{48} Del. Ran	D_{49} Ga. Ran	D_{50} Iowa; Ran
Majority →									D_{51} Ky. Ran
D_{60} S.D. Retired	D_{59} R.I. Ran	D_{58} N.H. Ran	D_{57} Mont. Ran	D_{56} Miss. Retired	D_{55} Minn. (sp); Retired	D_{54} Minn. (reg); Ran	D_{53} Maine; Ran	D_{52} La. Ran	D_{51} Ky. Ran
D_{61} W.Va. Ran	I_{1}	R_{38} Wyo. Retired	R_{37} Va. Retired	R_{36} Texas; Ran	R_{35} Tenn. Ran	R_{34} S.C. Ran	R_{33} Ore. Ran	R_{32} Okla. Retired	R_{31} N.C. Ran
R_{21}	R_{22} Alaska; Ran	R_{23} Idaho; Ran	R_{24} Ill. Ran	R_{25} Kan. Retired	R_{26} Mass. Ran	R_{27} Mich. Ran	R_{28} Neb. Retired	R_{29} N.J. Ran	R_{30} N.M. Ran
R_{20}	R_{19}	R_{18}	R_{17}	R_{16}	R_{15}	R_{14}	R_{13}	R_{12}	R_{11}
R_{1}	R_{2}	R_{3}	R_{4}	R_{5}	R_{6}	R_{7}	R_{8}	R_{9}	R_{10}

=== After the elections ===
D_{1}	D_{2}	D_{3}	D_{4}	D_{5}	D_{6}	D_{7}	D_{8}	D_{9}	D_{10}
D_{20}	D_{19}	D_{18}	D_{17}	D_{16}	D_{15}	D_{14}	D_{13}	D_{12}	D_{11}
D_{21}	D_{22}	D_{23}	D_{24}	D_{25}	D_{26}	D_{27}	D_{28}	D_{29}	D_{30}
D_{40}	D_{39}	D_{38}	D_{37}	D_{36}	D_{35}	D_{34}	D_{33}	D_{32}	D_{31}
D_{41}	D_{42}	D_{43}	D_{44} Ala. (reg); Re-elected	D_{45} Ala. (sp); Hold	D_{46} Ark. Hold	D_{47} Del. Re-elected	D_{48} Ga. Re-elected	D_{49} Ky. Re-elected	D_{50} La. Re-elected
Majority →									D_{51} Mont. Hold
R_{41} S.D. Gain	I_{1}	D_{58} Okla. Gain	D_{57} N.J. Gain	D_{56} Neb. Gain	D_{55} Mich. Gain	D_{54} Mass. Gain	D_{53} W.Va. Re-elected	D_{52} R.I. Re-elected	D_{51} Mont. Hold
R_{40} N.H. Gain	R_{39} Miss. Gain	R_{38} Minn. (sp); Gain	R_{37} Minn. (reg); Gain (Note: Appointee defeated)	R_{36} Maine; Gain	R_{35} Iowa; Gain	R_{34} Colo. Gain	R_{33} Wyo. Hold	R_{32} Va. Hold	R_{31} Texas; Re-elected
R_{21}	R_{22} Alaska; Re-elected	R_{23} Idaho; Re-elected	R_{24} Ill. Re-elected	R_{25} Kan. Hold	R_{26} N.M. Re-elected	R_{27} N.C. Re-elected	R_{28} Ore. Re-elected	R_{29} S.C. Re-elected	R_{30} Tenn. Re-elected
R_{20}	R_{19}	R_{18}	R_{17}	R_{16}	R_{15}	R_{14}	R_{13}	R_{12}	R_{11}
R_{1}	R_{2}	R_{3}	R_{4}	R_{5}	R_{6}	R_{7}	R_{8}	R_{9}	R_{10}

Key

D_{#}	Democratic
R_{#}	Republican
I_{#}	Independent

== Race summary ==
=== Special elections during the 95th Congress ===
In these special elections, the winner was seated during 1978 or before January 3, 1979; ordered by election date, then state.

State	Incumbent			Result	Candidates
State	Senator	Party	Electoral history	Result	Candidates
Alabama (Class 3)	Maryon Pittman Allen	Democratic	1978 (appointed)	Interim appointee lost nomination. Democratic hold.	▌ ✓ Donald Stewart (Democratic) 55.1%; ▌James D. Martin (Republican) 43.3%; Others: ▌Michael R. A. Erdey (Libertarian) 0.8%; ▌A. J. Killingsworth (Prohibition) 0.8%
Minnesota (Class 1)	Muriel Humphrey	DFL	1978 (appointed)	Interim appointee ineligible to run. Republican gain.	▌ ✓ David Durenberger (Republican) 61.4%; ▌Bob Short (DFL) 34.6%; ▌Paul Helm (American) 2.9%; Others: ▌Christine Frank (Socialist) 0.7%; ▌Frederick Hewitt (Libertarian) 0.3%

=== Elections leading to the next Congress ===
In these general elections, the winners were elected for the term beginning January 3, 1979; ordered by state.

All of the elections involved the Class 2 seats.

State	Incumbent			Result	Candidates
State	Senator	Party	Electoral history	Result	Candidates
Alabama	John Sparkman	Democratic	1946 (special); 1948; 1954; 1960; 1966; 1972	Incumbent retired. Democratic hold.	▌ ✓ Howell Heflin (Democratic) 94.0%; ▌Jerome B. Couch (Prohibition) 6.0%
Alaska	Ted Stevens	Republican	1968 (appointed); 1970; 1972	Incumbent re-elected.	▌ ✓ Ted Stevens (Republican) 75.6%; ▌Donald W. Hobbs (Democratic) 24.1%
Arkansas	Kaneaster Hodges Jr.	Democratic	1977 (appointed)	Interim appointee retired. Democratic hold.	▌ ✓ David Pryor (Democratic) 76.5%; ▌Tom Kelly (Republican) 16.3%; ▌John J. Black (Independent) 7.2%
Colorado	Floyd Haskell	Democratic	1972	Incumbent lost re-election. Republican gain.	▌ ✓ William L. Armstrong (Republican) 58.7%; ▌Floyd Haskell (Democratic) 40.3%; Others: ▌Vedder V. Dorn (United States Party) 0.7%; ▌John Shue (National Statesman) 0.3%
Delaware	Joe Biden	Democratic	1972	Incumbent re-elected.	▌ ✓ Joe Biden (Democratic) 58.0%; ▌James H. Baxter (Republican) 41.0%; ▌Donald G. Gies (American) 1.0%
Georgia	Sam Nunn	Democratic	1972 (special); 1972	Incumbent re-elected.	▌ ✓ Sam Nunn (Democratic) 83.1%; ▌John W. Stokes (Republican) 16.9%
Idaho	James A. McClure	Republican	1972	Incumbent re-elected.	▌ ✓ James A. McClure (Republican) 68.4%; ▌Dwight Jensen (Democratic) 31.6%
Illinois	Charles H. Percy	Republican	1966; 1972	Incumbent re-elected.	▌ ✓ Charles H. Percy (Republican) 53.3%; ▌Alex Seith (Democratic) 45.5%; Others: ▌William R. Roy (Libertarian) 0.5%; ▌Patricia Grogan (Socialist Workers) 0.5%; ▌Gerald Rose (Socialist Labor) 0.2%
Iowa	Dick Clark	Democratic	1972	Incumbent lost re-election. Republican gain.	▌ ✓ Roger Jepsen (Republican) 51.1%; ▌Dick Clark (Democratic) 47.9%; Others: ▌Gerald Leo Baker (Independent) 0.5%; ▌Ben L. Olson (Libertarian) 0.4%
Kansas	James B. Pearson	Republican	1962 (appointed); 1962 (special); 1966; 1972	Incumbent retired. Republican hold. Incumbent resigned December 23, 1978 to give successor preferential seniority. Successor appointed December 23, 1978.	▌ ✓ Nancy Kassebaum (Republican) 53.9%; ▌William R. Roy (Democratic) 42.4%; ▌James R. Maher (Conservative) 3.0%; ▌Russell Mikels (Prohibition) 0.7%
Kentucky	Walter Dee Huddleston	Democratic	1972	Incumbent re-elected.	▌ ✓ Walter Dee Huddleston (Democratic) 61.0%; ▌Louie R. Guenthner Jr. (Republican) 36.9%; ▌Anthony A. McCord (American) 2.1%
Louisiana	J. Bennett Johnston	Democratic	1972 (appointed); 1972	Incumbent re-elected.	▌ ✓ J. Bennett Johnston (Democratic) 59.4%; ▌Woody Jenkins (Democratic) 40.6%
Maine	William Hathaway	Democratic	1972	Incumbent lost re-election. Republican gain.	▌ ✓ William Cohen (Republican) 56.6%; ▌William Hathaway (Democratic) 33.9%; ▌Hayes E. Gahagan (Independent) 7.4%; Others: ▌John J. Jannace (Independent) 1.5%; ▌Plato Truman (Independent) 0.6%
Massachusetts	Edward Brooke	Republican	1966; 1972	Incumbent lost re-election. Democratic gain.	▌ ✓ Paul Tsongas (Democratic) 55.1%; ▌Edward Brooke (Republican) 44.9%
Michigan	Robert P. Griffin	Republican	1966 (appointed); 1966; 1972	Incumbent lost re-election. Democratic gain.	▌ ✓ Carl Levin (Democratic) 52.1%; ▌Robert P. Griffin (Republican) 47.9%
Minnesota	Wendell R. Anderson	DFL	1976 (appointed)	Interim appointee lost election. Republican gain. Incumbent resigned December 29, 1978 to give successor preferential seniority. Successor appointed December 30, 1978.	▌ ✓ Rudy Boschwitz (Republican) 56.6%; ▌Wendell R. Anderson (DFL) 40.4%; Others: ▌Sal Carlone (American) 1.5%; ▌William Peterson (Socialist Workers) 0.6%; ▌Brian Coyle (Public Interest Independent) 0.5%; ▌Jean T. Brust (Workers) 0.2%; ▌Leonard Richards (Libertarian) 0.2%
Mississippi	James Eastland	Democratic	1942; 1948; 1954; 1960; 1966; 1972	Incumbent retired. Republican gain. Incumbent resigned December 27, 1978 to give successor preferential seniority. Successor appointed December 27, 1978.	▌ ✓ Thad Cochran (Republican) 45.3%; ▌Maurice Dantin (Democratic) 31.8%; ▌Charles Evers (Independent) 22.6%; ▌Henry Kirksey (Independent) 0.3%
Montana	Paul G. Hatfield	Democratic	1978 (appointed)	Interim appointee lost nomination. Democratic hold. Incumbent resigned December 12, 1978 to give successor preferential seniority. Successor appointed December 15, 1978.	▌ ✓ Max Baucus (Democratic) 55.7%; ▌Larry Williams (Republican) 44.3%
Nebraska	Carl Curtis	Republican	1954; 1960; 1966; 1972	Incumbent retired. Democratic gain.	▌ ✓ J. James Exon (Democratic) 67.6%; ▌Donald Shasteen (Republican) 32.3%
New Hampshire	Thomas J. McIntyre	Democratic	1962 (special); 1966; 1972	Incumbent lost re-election. Republican gain.	▌ ✓ Gordon J. Humphrey (Republican) 50.7%; ▌Thomas J. McIntyre (Democratic) 48.5%; ▌Craig Franklin (Libertarian) 0.8%
New Jersey	Clifford P. Case	Republican	1954; 1960; 1966; 1972	Incumbent lost renomination. Democratic gain.	▌ ✓ Bill Bradley (Democratic) 55.3%; ▌Jeffrey Bell (Republican) 43.1%; Others: ▌Herbert Harry Shaw (Independent) 0.2%; ▌Bill Gahres (Independent) 0.2%; ▌Jack Moyers (Independent) 0.2%; ▌Robert Bowen (Labor) 0.2%; ▌J.M. Carter Jr. (Independent) 0.2%; ▌Jasper C. Gould (Independent) 0.2%; ▌William R. Thorn (Independent) 0.1%; ▌Paul Ferguson (Independent) 0.1%; ▌Alice Conner (Independent) 0.1%
New Mexico	Pete Domenici	Republican	1972	Incumbent re-elected.	▌ ✓ Pete Domenici (Republican) 53.4%; ▌Toney Anaya (Democratic) 46.6%
North Carolina	Jesse Helms	Republican	1972	Incumbent re-elected.	▌ ✓ Jesse Helms (Republican) 54.5%; ▌John Ingram (Democratic) 45.5%
Oklahoma	Dewey F. Bartlett	Republican	1972	Incumbent retired. Democratic gain.	▌ ✓ David Boren (Democratic) 65.5%; ▌Robert B. Kamm (Republican) 32.9%; Others: ▌Glenn E. Hager (Independent) 0.5%; ▌Riley Donica (Independent) 0.4%; ▌Paul Edward Trent (Independent) 0.4%; ▌Richard King Carter (Independent) 0.3%
Oregon	Mark Hatfield	Republican	1966; 1972	Incumbent re-elected.	▌ ✓ Mark Hatfield (Republican) 61.6%; ▌Vernon Cook (Democratic) 38.3%
Rhode Island	Claiborne Pell	Democratic	1960; 1966; 1972	Incumbent re-elected.	▌ ✓ Claiborne Pell (Democratic) 75.1%; ▌James G. Reynolds (Republican) 24.9%
South Carolina	Strom Thurmond	Republican	1954 (write-in) (Note: Senator Strom Thurmond was originally elected as a Democrat in 1954, but as a write-in candidate, a special election in 1956 and 1960 before switching to a Republican in 1964. Thurmond won re-election as a Republican in 1966 and 1972.); 1954 (appointed); 1956 (resigned); 1956 (special); 1960; 1966; 1972	Incumbent re-elected.	▌ ✓ Strom Thurmond (Republican) 55.6%; ▌Charles D. Ravenel (Democratic) 44.4%
South Dakota	James Abourezk	Democratic	1972	Incumbent retired. New senator elected. Republican gain.	▌ ✓ Larry Pressler (Republican) 66.8%; ▌Don Barnett (Democratic) 33.2%
Tennessee	Howard Baker	Republican	1966; 1972	Incumbent re-elected.	▌ ✓ Howard Baker (Republican) 55.5%; ▌Jane Eskind (Democratic) 40.3%; ▌Thomas Anderson (Independent) 4.0%; ▌Fern Lucius Keasler (Independent) 0.2%
Texas	John Tower	Republican	1961 (special); 1966; 1972	Incumbent re-elected.	▌ ✓ John Tower (Republican) 49.8%; ▌Bob Krueger (Democratic) 49.3%; Others: ▌Luis A. Diaz de Leon (Raza Unida) 0.8%; ▌Miguel Pendas (Socialist Workers) 0.2%
Virginia	William L. Scott	Republican	1972	Incumbent retired. Republican hold. Incumbent resigned January 1, 1979 to give successor preferential seniority. Successor appointed January 2, 1979.	▌ ✓ John Warner (Republican) 50.2%; ▌Andrew P. Miller (Democratic) 49.8%
West Virginia	Jennings Randolph	Democratic	1958 (special); 1960; 1966; 1972	Incumbent re-elected.	▌ ✓ Jennings Randolph (Democratic) 50.5%; ▌Arch A. Moore Jr. (Republican) 49.5%
Wyoming	Clifford Hansen	Republican	1966; 1972	Incumbent retired. Republican hold. Incumbent resigned December 31, 1978 to give successor preferential seniority. Successor appointed January 1, 1979.	▌ ✓ Alan Simpson (Republican) 62.2%; ▌Raymond B. Whitaker (Democratic) 37.8%

== Closest races ==
Nine races had a margin of victory under 10%:

State	Party of winner	Margin
Virginia	Republican	0.38%
Texas	Republican	0.53%
West Virginia	Democratic	0.96%
New Hampshire	Republican (flip)	2.20%
Iowa	Republican (flip)	3.21%
Michigan	Democratic (flip)	4.29%
New Mexico	Republican	6.82%
Illinois	Republican	7.87%
North Carolina	Republican	9.02%

Oklahoma was the tipping point state with a margin of 32.6%.

== Alabama ==
There were two elections in Alabama, due to the death of senator Jim Allen.

=== Alabama (regular) ===
Alabama general election
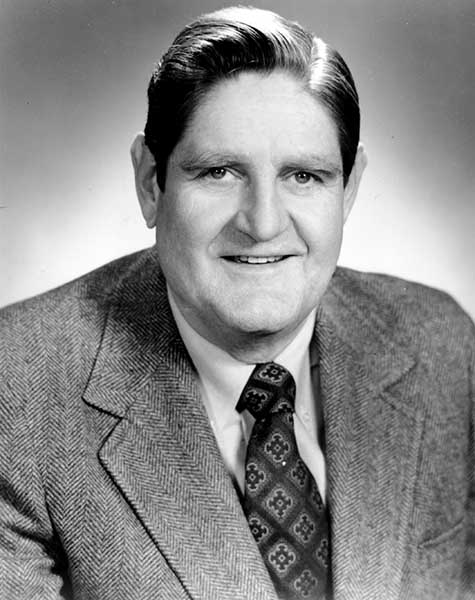
Nominee	Howell Heflin	Jerome B. Couch
Party	Democratic	Prohibition
Popular vote	547,054	34,951
Percentage	94%	6%
- County results Heflin: 80–90% >90%
U.S. senator before election
John Sparkman
Democratic
Elected U.S. Senator
Howell Heflin
Democratic

Democrat John Sparkman retired and was succeeded by Howell Heflin, the former chief justice of the Supreme Court of Alabama. Heflin, the Democratic candidate, faced no Republican opponent in the general election, defeating Prohibition Party nominee Jerome B. Couch.

General election
Party	Candidate	Votes	%
Democratic	Howell Heflin	547,054	93.99%
Prohibition	Jerome B. Couch	34,951	6.01%
Majority		512,103	87.98%
Turnout		582,005	
Democratic hold			

=== Alabama (special) ===
Alabama special election
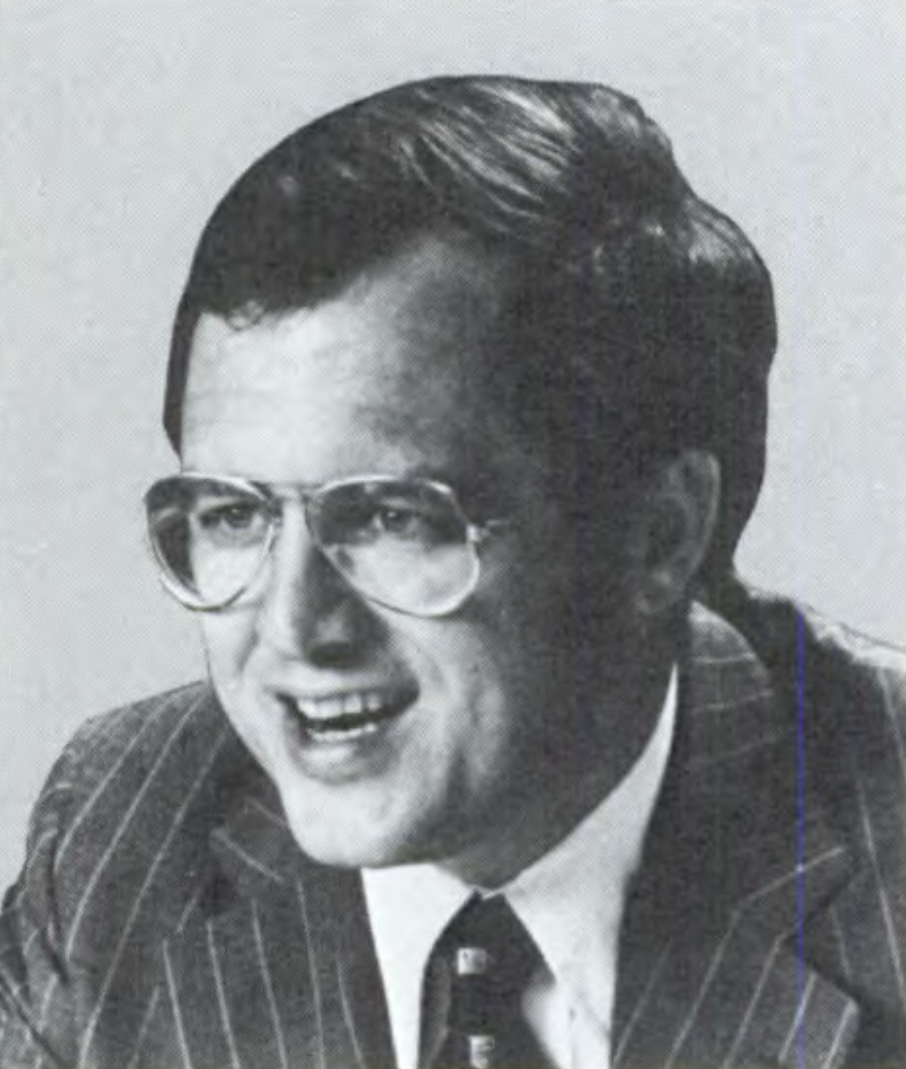

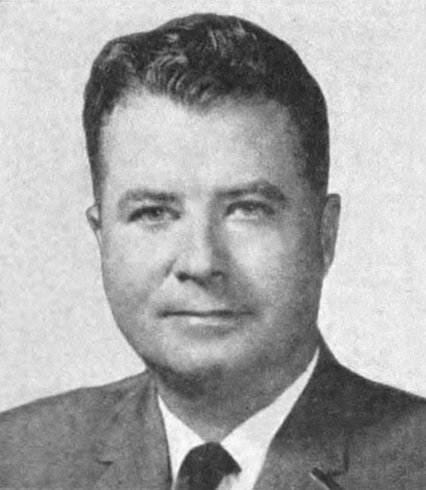
Nominee	Donald W. Stewart	James D. Martin
Party	Democratic	Republican
Popular vote	401,852	316,170
Percentage	55.1%	43.3%
- County results Stewart: 50–60% 60–70% 70–80% 80–90% Martin: 50–60% 60–70%
U.S. senator before election
Maryon Pittman Allen
Democratic
Elected U.S. Senator
Donald W. Stewart
Democratic

Following the death of senator Jim Allen, his widow Maryon was appointed by governor George Wallace to fill the vacancy until a special election could be held. In this election, Democratic state senator Donald W. Stewart defeated former Republican congressman James D. Martin to serve the remaining two years of the term.

General election
Party	Candidate	Votes	%
Democratic	Donald W. Stewart	401,852	54.93%
Republican	James D. Martin	316,170	43.22%
Libertarian	Michael R. A. Erdey	6,006	0.82%
Prohibition	A. J. Killingsworth	5,814	0.80%
Peace and Freedom	Joseph T. Robino	1,768	0.24%
Majority		85,682	11.74%
Turnout		731,610	
Democratic hold			

== Alaska ==
Alaska election
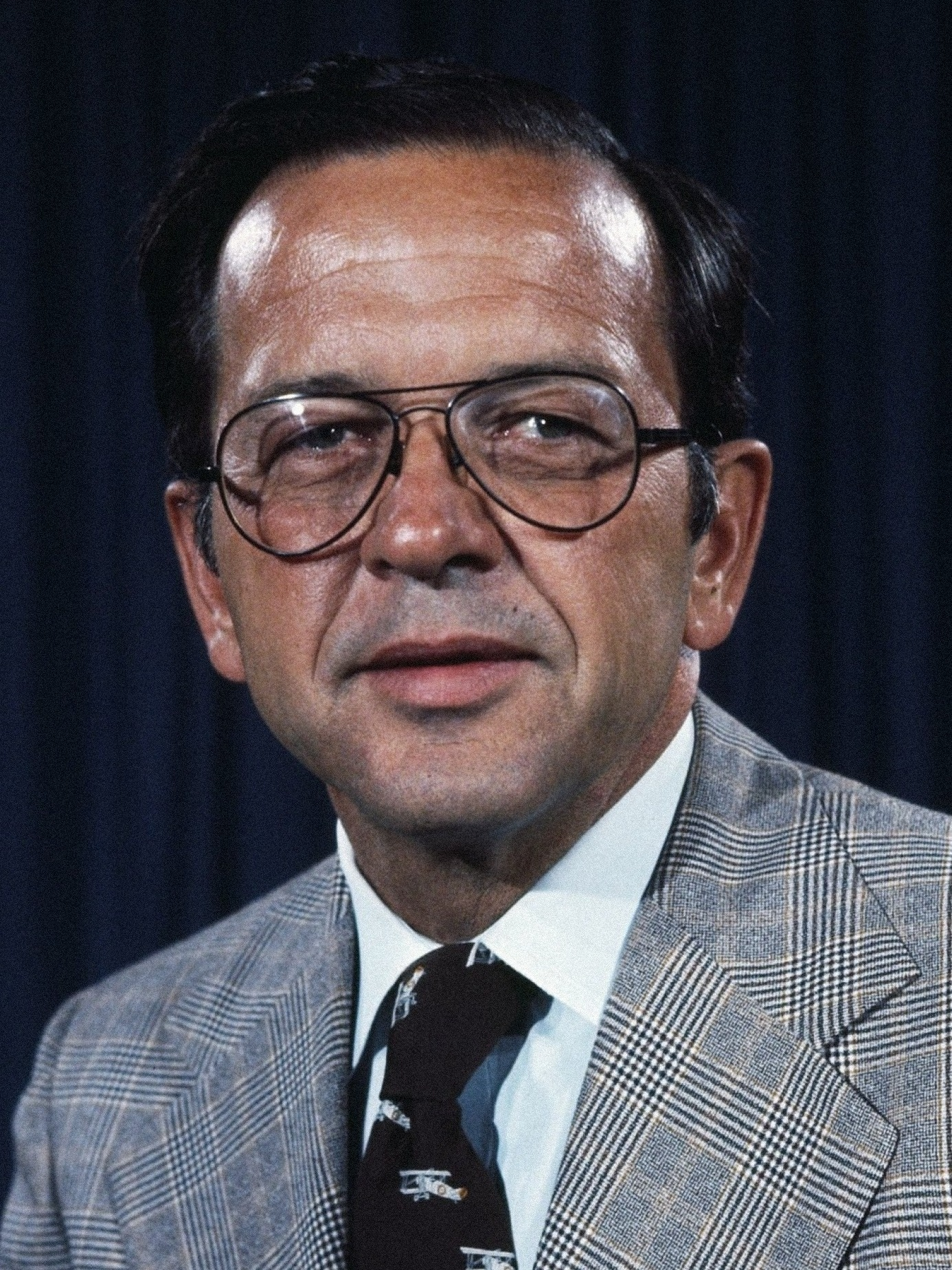

Nominee	Ted Stevens	Donald Hobbs
Party	Republican	Democratic
Popular vote	92,783	29,574
Percentage	75.59%	24.10%
- Results by state house district Stevens: 60–70% 70–80% 80–90%
U.S. senator before election
Ted Stevens
Republican
Elected U.S. Senator
Ted Stevens
Republican

Republican Ted Stevens won reelection to a second full (his third total) term, defeating Democrat Donald Hobbs.

1978 United States Senate election in Alaska
Party	Candidate	Votes	%	±%
Republican	Ted Stevens (Incumbent)	92,783	75.59%	
Democratic	Donald Hobbs	29,574	24.09%	
Write-ins	Write-ins	384	0.31%	
Majority		63,209	51.50%	
Turnout		122,741		
Republican hold		Swing		

== Arkansas ==
Arkansas election
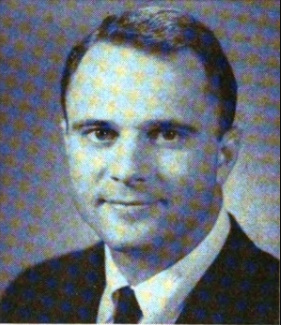

Nominee	David Pryor	Thomas Kelly Jr.	John G. Black
Party	Democratic	Republican	Independent
Popular vote	399,916	84,722	37,488
Percentage	76.58%	16.22%	7.18%
- County results Pryor: 50–60% 60–70% 70–80% 80–90%
U.S. senator before election
Kaneaster Hodges Jr.
Democratic
Elected U.S. Senator
David H. Pryor
Democratic

Following the death of senator John L. McClellan, then Kaneaster Hodges Jr. was appointed by governor David Pryor to fill the vacancy until a special election could be held. In this election, Democratic state governor David Pryor defeated former Republican challenger Thomas Kelly Jr. to serve the six-year term.

1978 United States Senate election in Arkansas
Party	Candidate	Votes	%
Democratic	David Pryor	395,506	76.48%
Republican	Tom Kelly	84,308	16.30%
Independent	John G. Black	37,211	7.20%
None	Write-ins	113	0.02%
Majority		311,198	60.18%
Turnout		517,138	
Democratic hold			

== Colorado ==
Colorado election
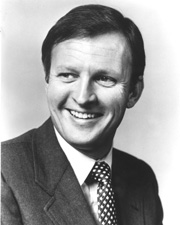

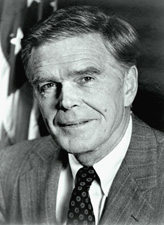
Nominee	William L. Armstrong	Floyd Haskell
Party	Republican	Democratic
Popular vote	480,801	330,148
Percentage	58.69%	40.30%
- County results Armstrong: 50–60% 60–70% 70–80% Haskell: 50–60% 60–70% 70–80%
U.S. senator before election
Floyd Haskell
Democratic
Elected U.S. Senator
William L. Armstrong
Republican

Democrat Floyd Haskell decided to run for re-election to a second term, but was defeated by William L. Armstrong, the Republican nominee and the U.S. Representative.

1978 United States Senate election in Colorado
Party	Candidate	Votes	%
Republican	William L. Armstrong	480,801	58.69%
Democratic	Floyd Haskell (Incumbent)	330,148	40.30%
United States Party	Vedder V. Dorn	5,789	0.71%
National Statesman	John Shue	2,518	0.31%
Majority		150,653	18.39%
Turnout		819,256	
Republican gain from Democratic			

== Delaware ==
Delaware election
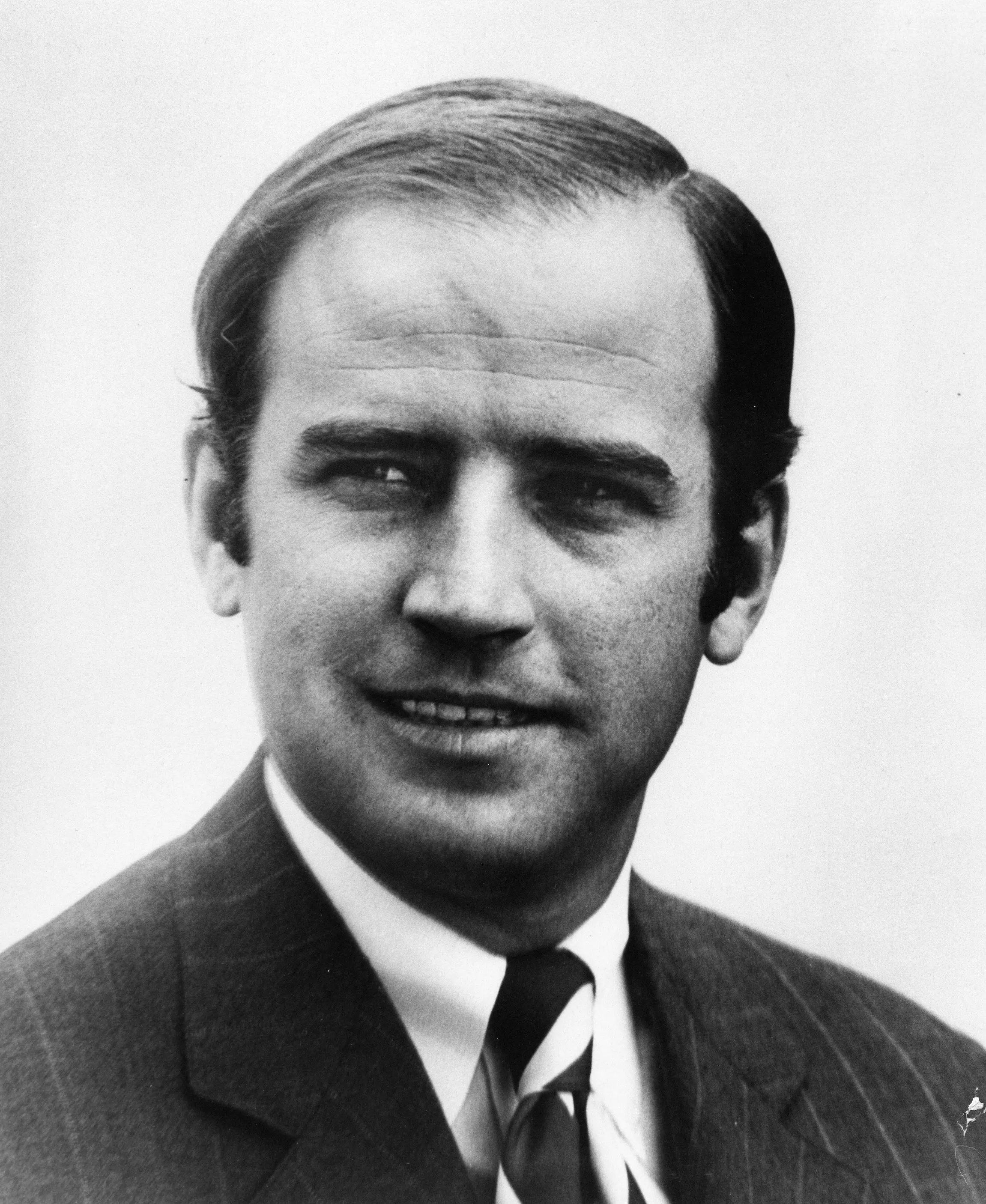

Nominee	Joe Biden	James H. Baxter Jr.
Party	Democratic	Republican
Popular vote	93,930	66,479
Percentage	57.96%	41.02%
- County results Biden: 50–60%
U.S. senator before election
Joe Biden
Democratic
Elected U.S. Senator
Joe Biden
Democratic

Democratic United States senator Joe Biden won re-election to a second term, defeating Republican challenger James H. Baxter Jr., the Delaware Secretary of Agriculture.

General election
Party	Candidate	Votes	%	±%
Democratic	Joe Biden (Incumbent)	93,930	57.96%	+7.48%
Republican	James H. Baxter Jr.	66,479	41.02%	−8.08%
American	Donald G. Gies	1,663	1.02%	+0.68%
Majority		27,451	16.94%	+15.56%
Turnout		162,072		
Democratic hold		Swing		

== Georgia ==
Georgia election
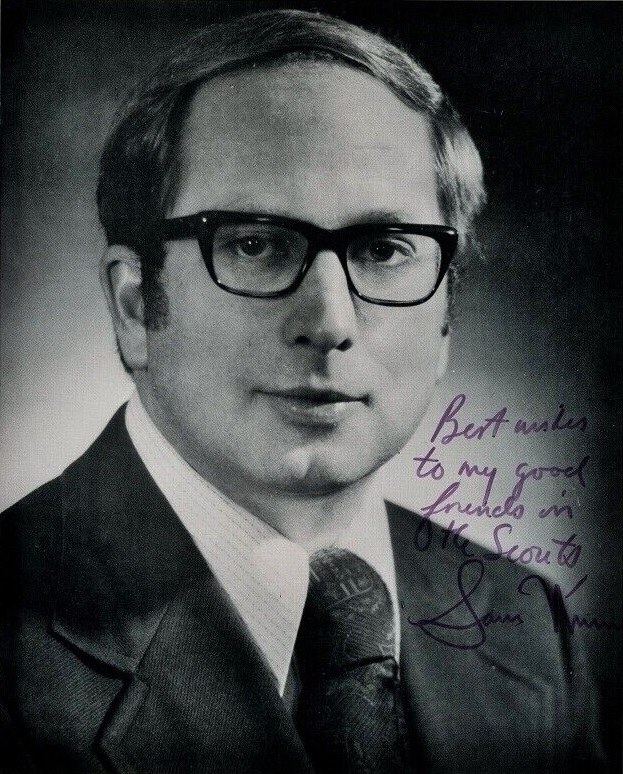

Nominee	Sam Nunn	John W. Stokes
Party	Democratic	Republican
Popular vote	536,320	108,808
Percentage	83.1%	16.9%
- County results Nunn: 50–60% 70–80% 80–90% >90%
U.S. senator before election
Sam Nunn
Democratic
Elected U.S. Senator
Sam Nunn
Democratic

Democrat Sam Nunn won re-election to a second term.

General election
Party	Candidate	Votes	%	±%
Democratic	Sam Nunn (incumbent)	536,320	83.13%	+29.17%
Republican	John W. Stokes	108,808	16.87%	−29.14%
Majority		427,512	66.27%	+58.32%
Turnout		645,128		
Democratic hold		Swing		

== Idaho ==
Idaho election
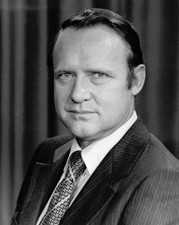

Nominee	James A. McClure	Dwight Jensen
Party	Republican	Democratic
Popular vote	194,412	89,635
Percentage	68.44%	31.56%
- County results McClure: 50–60% 60–70% 70–80% 80–90%
U.S. senator before election
James A. McClure
Republican
Elected U.S. Senator
James A. McClure
Republican

Republican James A. McClure was elected to a second term in office.

1978 United States Senate election in Idaho
Party	Candidate	Votes	%	±%
Republican	James A. McClure (Incumbent)	194,412	68.44%	
Democratic	Dwight Jensen	89,635	31.56%	
Majority		104,777	36.88%	
Turnout		284,047		
Republican hold		Swing		

== Illinois ==
Illinois election
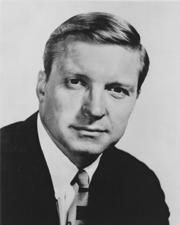

Nominee	Charles Percy	Alex Seith
Party	Republican	Democratic
Popular vote	1,698,711	1,448,187
Percentage	53.34%	45.47%
- County results Percy: 40–50% 50–60% 60–70% Seith: 50–60% 60–70%
U.S. senator before election
Charles H. Percy
Republican
Elected U.S. Senator
Charles H. Percy
Republican

Republican Charles H. Percy ran for re-election to a third term in the United States Senate. Percy was opposed by Democratic nominee Alex Seith (D), attorney and former member of the Cook County Zoning Board of Appeals. Though Percy had been expected to coast to re-election over Seith, a first-time candidate, the election quickly became competitive. In the last few days of the campaign, a desperate Percy ran a television advertisement that featured him apologizing and acknowledging that, "I got your message and you're right." Percy's last-ditch effort appeared to have paid off, as he was able to edge out Seith to win what would end up being his third and final term in the Senate.

1978 United States Senate election in Illinois
Party	Candidate	Votes	%	±%
Republican	Charles H. Percy (Incumbent)	1,698,711	53.34%	−8.88%
Democratic	Alex Seith	1,448,187	45.47%	+8.13%
Libertarian	Bruce Lee Green	16,320	0.51%	
Socialist Workers	Patricia Grogan	15,922	0.50%	
Socialist Labor	Gerald Rose	5,465	0.18%	
Write-ins		159	0.00%	
Majority		250,524	7.87%	−17.00%
Turnout		3,184,764		
Republican hold		Swing		

== Iowa ==
Iowa election

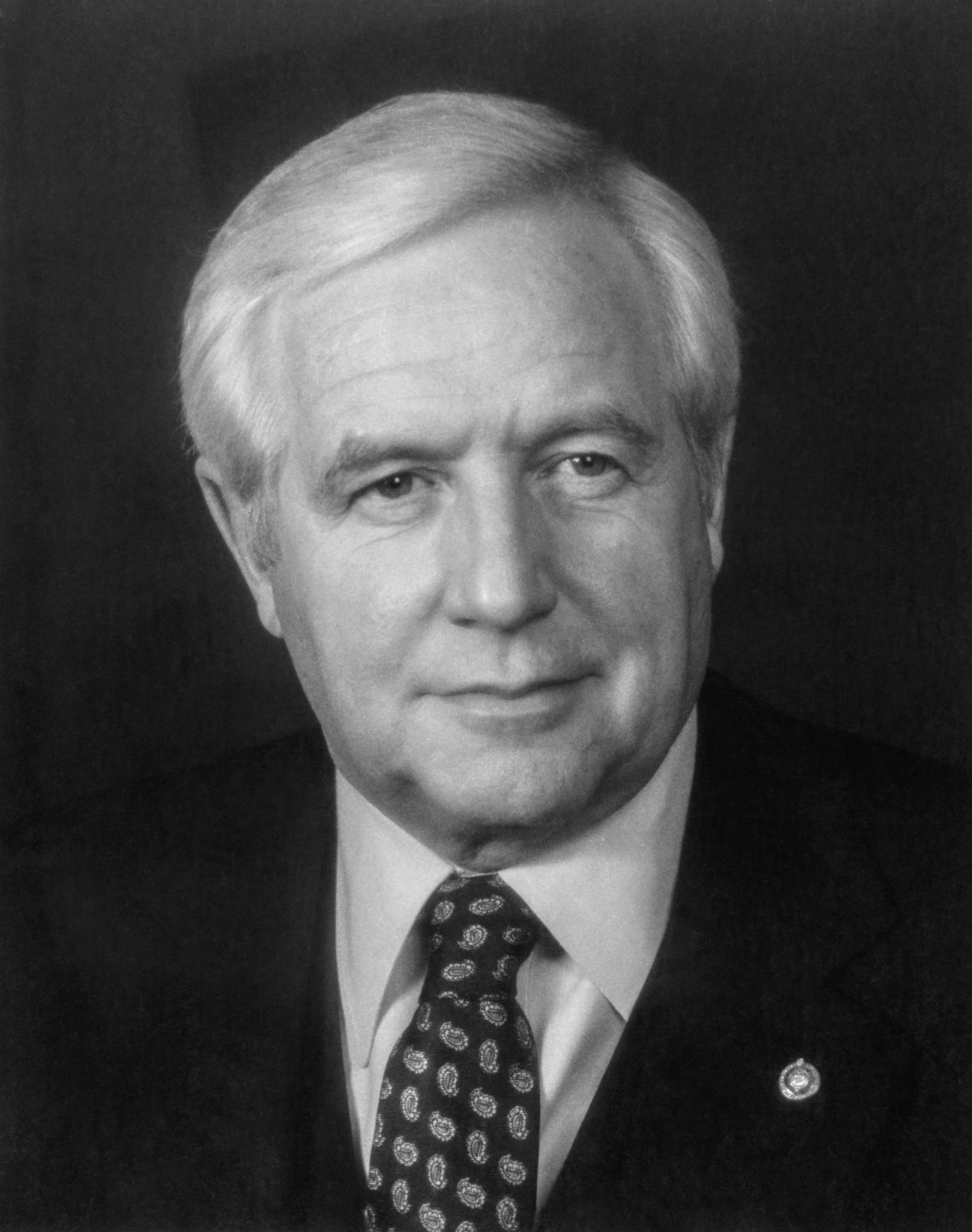

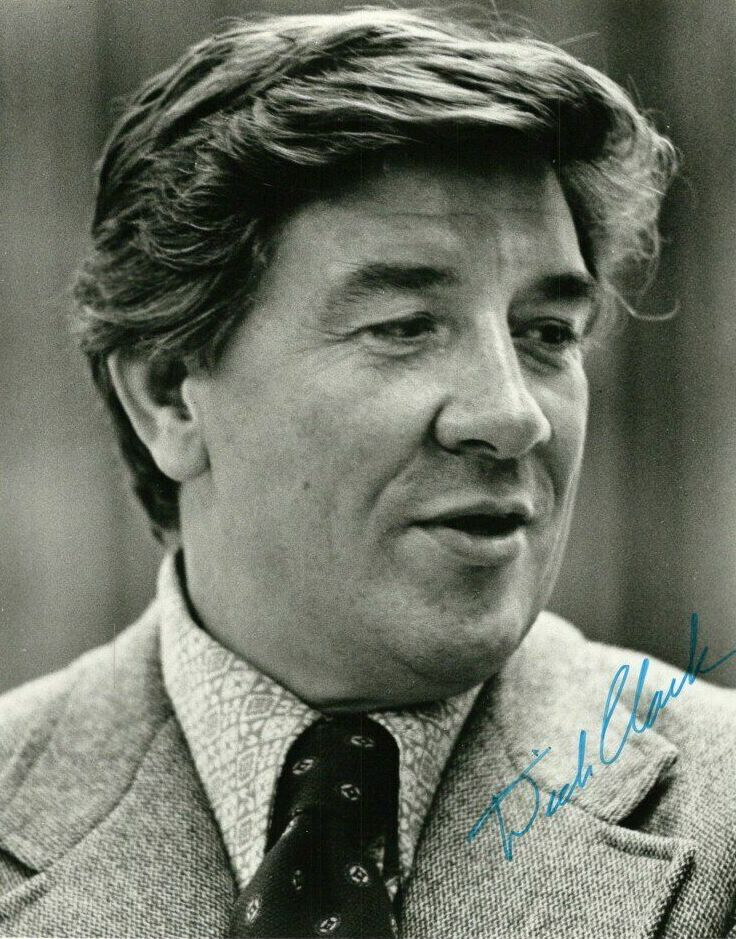
Nominee	Roger Jepsen	Dick Clark
Party	Republican	Democratic
Popular vote	421,598	395,066
Percentage	51.12%	47.91%
- County results Jepsen: 40–50% 50-60% 60-70% 70-80% Clark: 40–50% 50–60% 60–70%
U.S. senator before election
Dick Clark
Democratic
Elected U.S. Senator
Roger Jepsen
Republican

Democrat Dick Clark decided to run for re-election to a second term, but was defeated by Roger Jepsen, the Republican nominee and former Lieutenant Governor of Iowa.

1978 United States Senate election in Iowa
Party	Candidate	Votes	%
Republican	Roger Jepsen	421,598	51.13%
Democratic	Dick Clark (Incumbent)	395,066	47.91%
Independent	Gerald Leo Baker	4,223	0.51%
Libertarian	Ben L. Olson	3,689	0.45%
Majority		26,532	3.22%
Turnout		824,576	
Republican gain from Democratic			

== Kansas ==
Kansas election
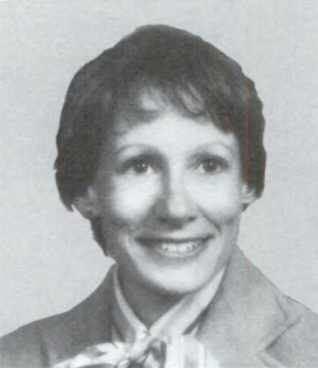

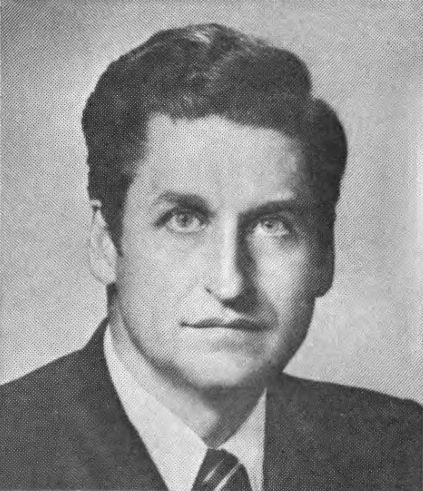
Nominee	Nancy Kassebaum	Bill Roy
Party	Republican	Democratic
Popular vote	403,354	317,602
Percentage	53.86%	42.41%
- County results Kassebaum: 40-50% 50-60% 60-70% 70-80% Roy: 40–50% 50–60%
U.S. senator before election
James B. Pearson
Republican
Elected U.S. Senator
Nancy Kassebaum
Republican

Republican James B. Pearson retired and was succeeded by Nancy Kassebaum, the daughter of Alf Landon, defeating Democratic nominee William R. Roy, the former U.S. Representative. Roy also lost to Bob Dole in the 1974 election for Kansas' other Senate seat.

1978 United States Senate election in Kansas
Party	Candidate	Votes	%
Republican	Nancy Kassebaum	403,354	53.86%
Democratic	William R. Roy	317,602	42.41%
Conservative	James R. Maher	22,497	3.00%
Prohibition	Russell Mikels	5,386	0.72%
Majority		85,752	11.45%
Turnout		748,839	
Republican hold			

== Kentucky ==
Kentucky election
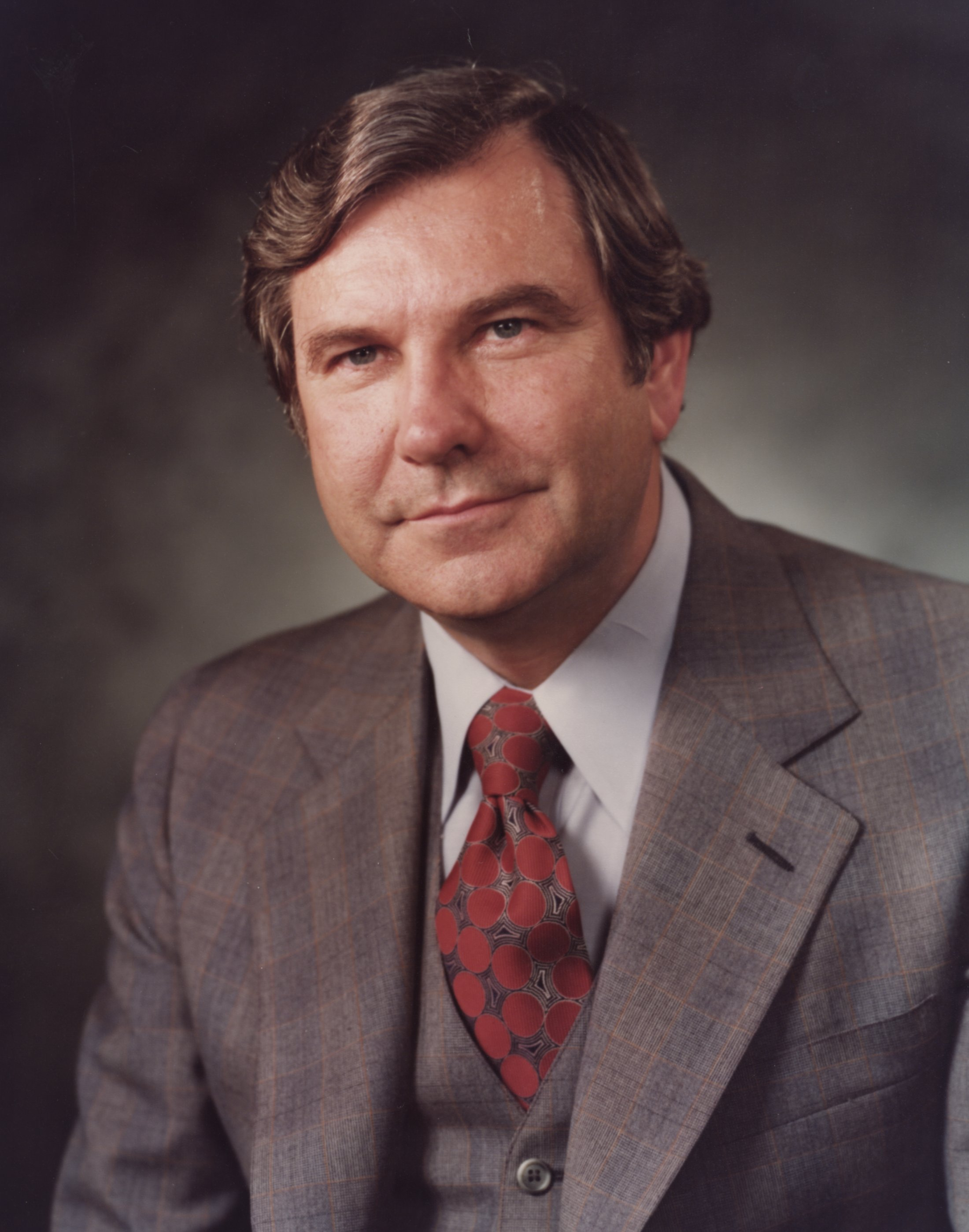
Nominee	Walter Huddleston	Louie R. Guenthner Jr.
Party	Democratic	Republican
Popular vote	290,730	175,766
Percentage	60.98%	36.87%
- County results Huddleston: 40–50% 50–60% 60–70% 70–80% 80–90% Guenthner: 40-50% 50-60% 60-70%
U.S. senator before election
Walter Huddleston
Democratic
Elected U.S. Senator
Walter Huddleston
Democratic

Democrat Walter Huddleston was re-elected to a second term.

General election
Party	Candidate	Votes	%
Democratic	Walter Huddleston (Incumbent)	290,730	60.98%
Republican	Louie R. Guenthner Jr.	175,766	36.86%
American	Anthony Albert McCord	10,244	2.15%
None	Write-Ins	32	0.01%
Majority		114,964	24.12
Turnout		476,783	
Democratic hold			

== Louisiana ==
1978 Democratic Senate primary election in Louisiana
- September 16, 1978
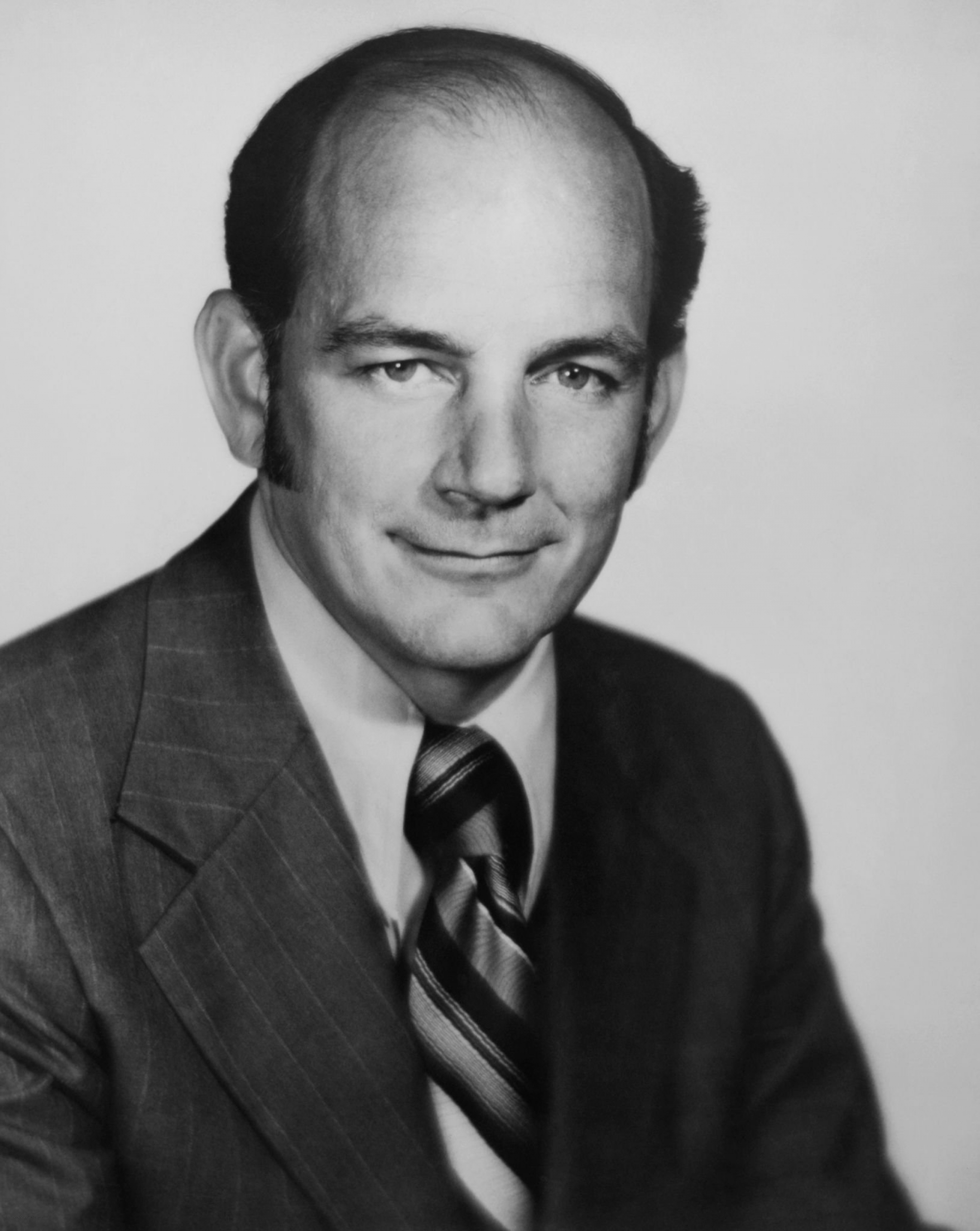

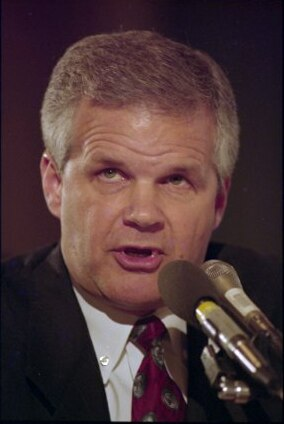
Nominee	J. Bennett Johnston	Woody Jenkins
Party	Democratic	Democratic
Popular vote	498,773	340,896
Percentage	59.40%	40.60%
- Parish results Johnston: 50–60% 60–70% 70–80% 80–90% Jenkins: 50-60%
U.S. senator before election
J. Bennett Johnston
Democratic
Elected U.S. Senator
J. Bennett Johnston
Democratic

Democrat J. Bennett Johnston won re-election to unopposed and his second term.

1978 United States Senate election in Louisiana
Party	Candidate	Votes	%
Democratic	J. Bennett Johnston (Incumbent)	Unopposed	
Democratic hold			

== Maine ==
Maine election
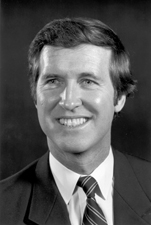

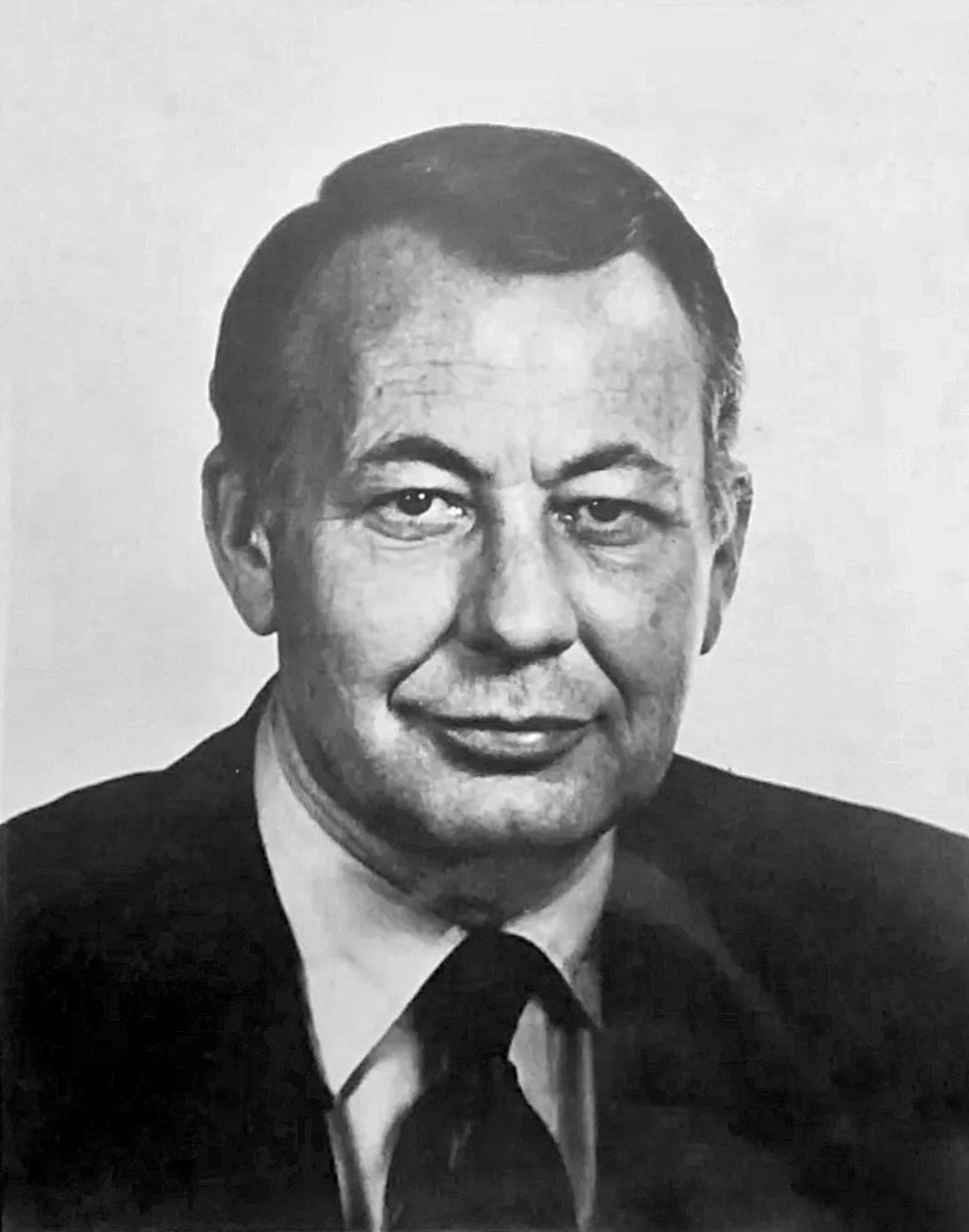

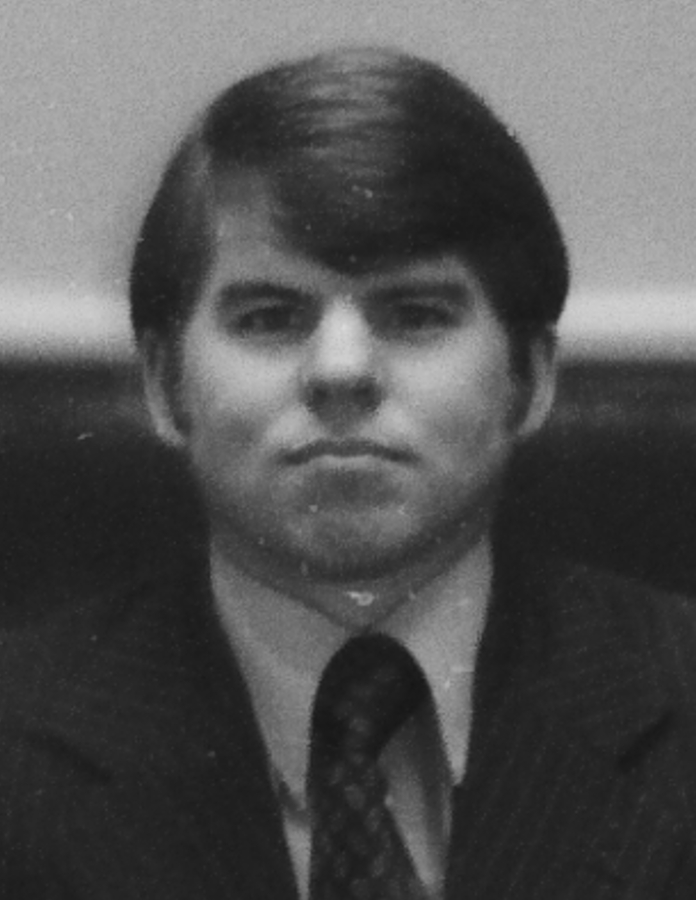
Nominee	William Cohen	William Hathaway
Party	Republican	Democratic
Popular vote	212,294	127,327
Percentage	56.59%	33.94%
Nominee	Hayes Gahagan
Party	Independent
Popular vote	27,824
Percentage	7.42%
- County results Cohen: 50–60% 60–70% 70–80%
U.S. senator before election
William Hathaway
Democratic
Elected U.S. Senator
William Cohen
Republican

Democrat William Hathaway decided to run for re-election to a second term, but was defeated by William Cohen, the Republican nominee and the United States Congressman from Maine's 2nd congressional district and Hayes Gahagan, former Maine State Senator

1978 United States Senate election in Maine
Party	Candidate	Votes	%	±%
Republican	William Cohen	212,294	56.59%	+9.83%
Democratic	William Hathaway (Incumbent)	127,327	33.94%	−19.29%
Independent	Hayes E. Gahagan	27,824	7.42%	
Independent	John J. Jannace	5,553	1.48%	
Independent	Plato Truman	2,116	0.56%	
Majority		84,967	22.65%	+16.19%
Turnout		375,114		
Republican gain from Democratic		Swing		

== Massachusetts ==
Massachusetts election
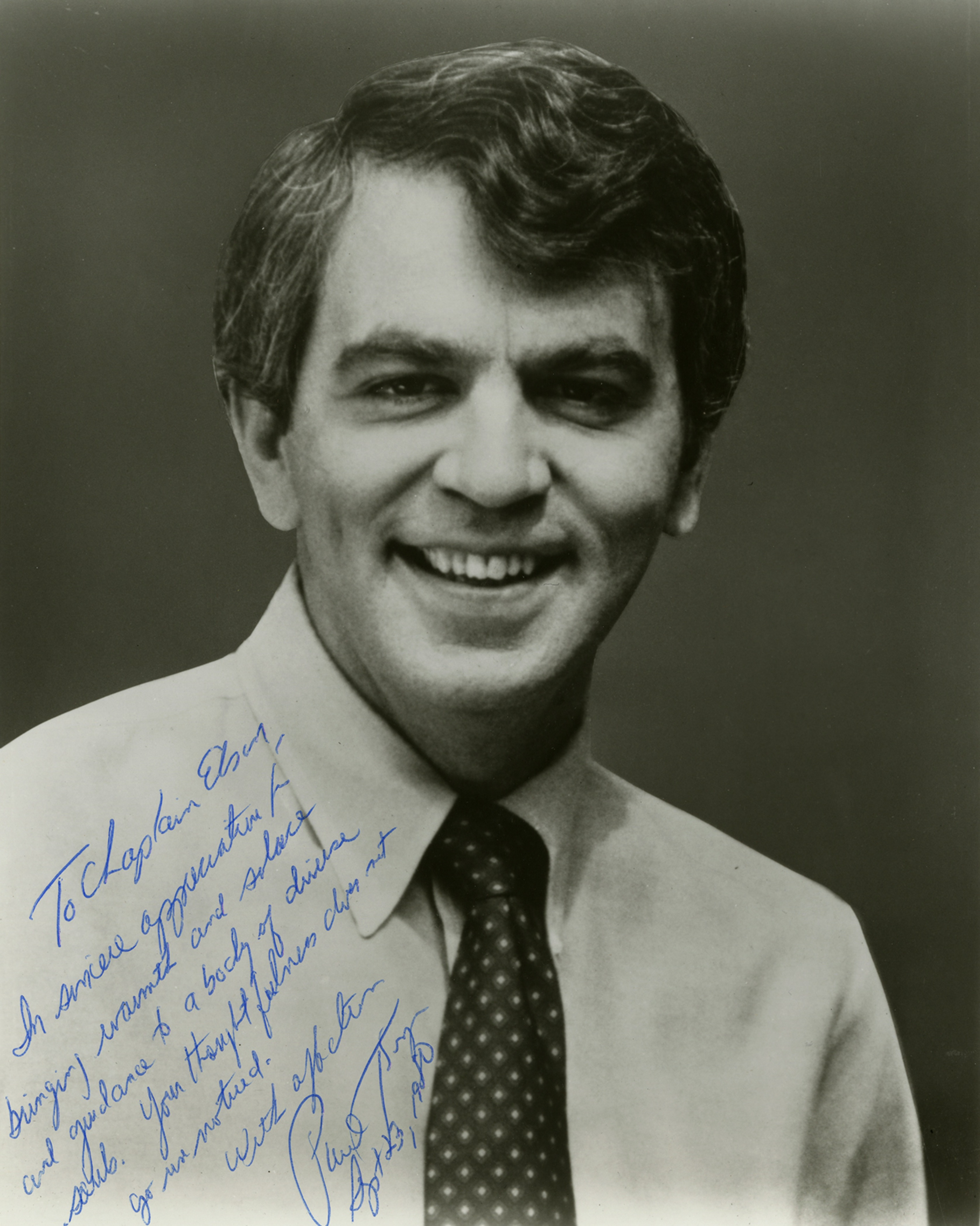

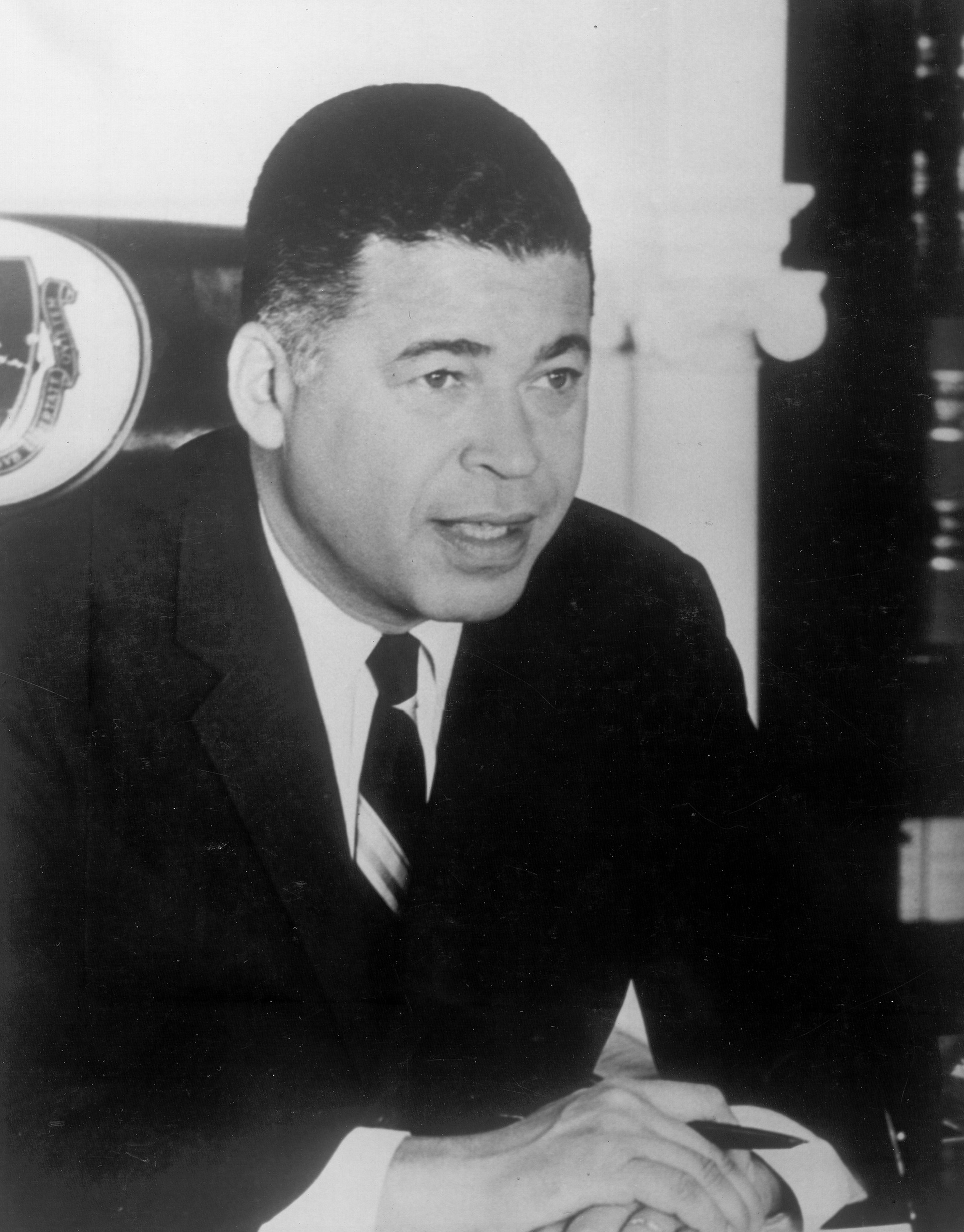
Nominee	Paul Tsongas	Edward Brooke
Party	Democratic	Republican
Popular vote	1,093,283	890,584
Percentage	55.06%	44.85%

Tsongas
40–50%
50–60%
60–70%
70–80%
Brooke
40–50%
50–60%
60–70%
70–80%
U.S. senator before election
Edward Brooke
Republican
Elected U.S. Senator
Paul Tsongas
Democratic

Republican Edward Brooke was defeated by Democratic congressman Paul E. Tsongas.

Republican primary
Party	Candidate	Votes	%
Republican	Edward Brooke (Incumbent)	146,351	53.25%
Republican	Avi Nelson	128,388	46.72%
	All others	78	0.03%

Democratic primary
Party	Candidate	Votes	%
Democratic	Paul Tsongas	296,915	35.55%
Democratic	Paul Guzzi	258,960	31.01%
Democratic	Kathleen Sullivan Alioto	161,036	19.28%
Democratic	Howard Phillips	65,397	7.83%
Democratic	Elaine Noble	52,464	6.28%
	All others	379	0.05%

General election
Party	Candidate	Votes	%
Democratic	Paul E. Tsongas	1,093,283	55.06%
Republican	Edward Brooke (Incumbent)	890,584	44.85%
	All others	1,833	0.09%
Total votes		1,985,700	68.01%
Majority		202,699	10.21%
Democratic gain from Republican			

== Michigan ==
Michigan election
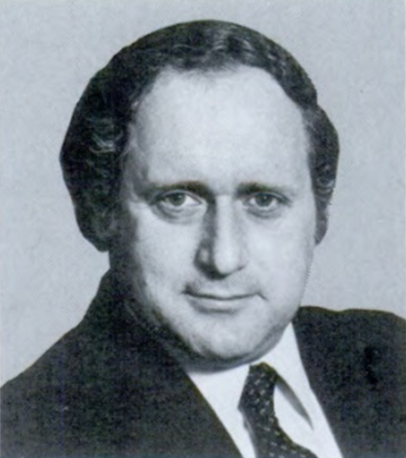

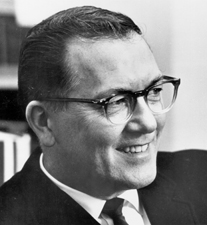
Nominee	Carl Levin	Robert P. Griffin
Party	Democratic	Republican
Popular vote	1,484,193	1,362,165
Percentage	52.1%	47.9%
- County results Levin: 50–60% 60–70% Griffin: 50–60% 60–70%
U.S. senator before election
Robert P. Griffin
Republican
Elected U.S. Senator
Carl Levin
Democratic

Republican Robert P. Griffin ran for re-election to a third term, but was defeated by the Democratic candidate, and former Detroit City Council President Carl Levin.

General election
Party	Candidate	Votes	%	±%
Democratic	Carl Levin	1,484,193	52.1%	N/A
Republican	Robert P. Griffin (Incumbent)	1,362,165	47.9%	−4.29%
Independent	Others	272	0.01%	−52.13%
Majority		122,028	4.29%	
Turnout		2,846,630		
Democratic gain from Republican		Swing		

== Minnesota ==
There were two elections in Minnesota, due to the death of Hubert Humphrey.

=== Minnesota (regular) ===
Minnesota general election
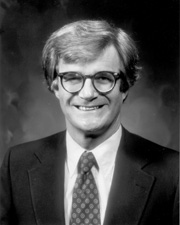

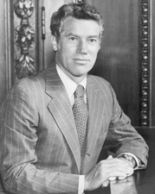
Nominee	Rudy Boschwitz	Wendell Anderson
Party	Ind.-Republican	Democratic (DFL)
Popular vote	894,092	638,375
Percentage	56.57%	40.39%
- County results Boschwitz: 40–50% 50–60% 60–70% 70–80% Anderson: 40–50%
U.S. senator before election
Wendell Anderson
Democratic (DFL)
Elected U.S. Senator
Rudy Boschwitz
Ind.-Republican

Democrat Wendell Anderson was defeated by Republican challenger businessman Rudy Boschwitz.

In 1978, all three key statewide races in Minnesota were up for election—the Governorship, and both Senate Seats (the other Senate seat belonged to Hubert Humphrey, who died in 1978). But, there was a particular oddity to the three races—all three had incumbents who were never elected to the office in the first place. This became a well played issue by the Republicans—a billboard put up across the state read, "The DFL is going to face something scary -- an election".

When Walter Mondale resigned after being elected to the Vice Presidency in 1976, sitting Governor Wendell Anderson resigned in order to be appointed by his successor Rudy Perpich to the open seat. This act did not sit well with the electorate. Plywood magnate Rudy Boschwitz campaigned as a liberal Republican and spent freely of his own money, but all that seemed to really matter was that he was neither a DFLer or Wendell Anderson in an election cycle where both were rejected by the voters. The result was not even close—the challenger Boschwitz won in a 16-point landslide as all three statewide offices switched into Republican hands.

Democratic primary election
Party	Candidate	Votes	%
Democratic (DFL)	Wendell Anderson (Incumbent)	286,209	56.9%
Democratic (DFL)	John S. Connolly	159,974	31.8%
Democratic (DFL)	Daryl W. Anderson	23,159	4.6%
Democratic (DFL)	Lloyd M. Roberts	12,709	2.5%
Democratic (DFL)	Dick Bullock	11,485	2.3%
Democratic (DFL)	Emil L. Moses	9,580	1.9%

Republican primary election
Party	Candidate	Votes	%
Ind.-Republican	Rudy Boschwitz	185,393	86.8%
Ind.-Republican	Harold Stassen	28,170	13.2%

General election
Party	Candidate	Votes	%
Ind.-Republican	Rudy Boschwitz	894,092	56.57%
Democratic (DFL)	Wendell Anderson (Incumbent)	638,375	40.39%
American	Sal Carlone	23,261	1.47%
Socialist Workers	William Peterson	9,856	0.62%
Independent	Brian J. Coyle	8,083	0.51%
Workers League	Jean T. Brust	3,891	0.25%
Libertarian	Leonard J. Richards	2,992	0.19%
Others	Write-ins	72	0.01%
Majority		255,717	16.18%
Turnout		1,580,622	
Ind.-Republican gain from Democratic (DFL)			

=== Minnesota (special) ===
Minnesota special election
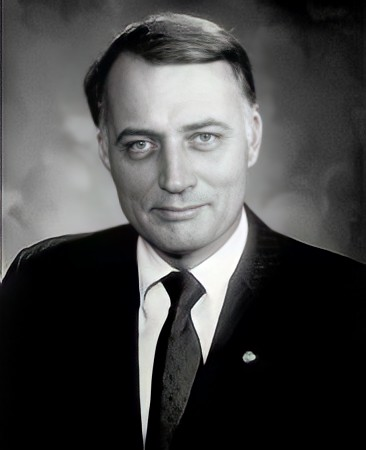

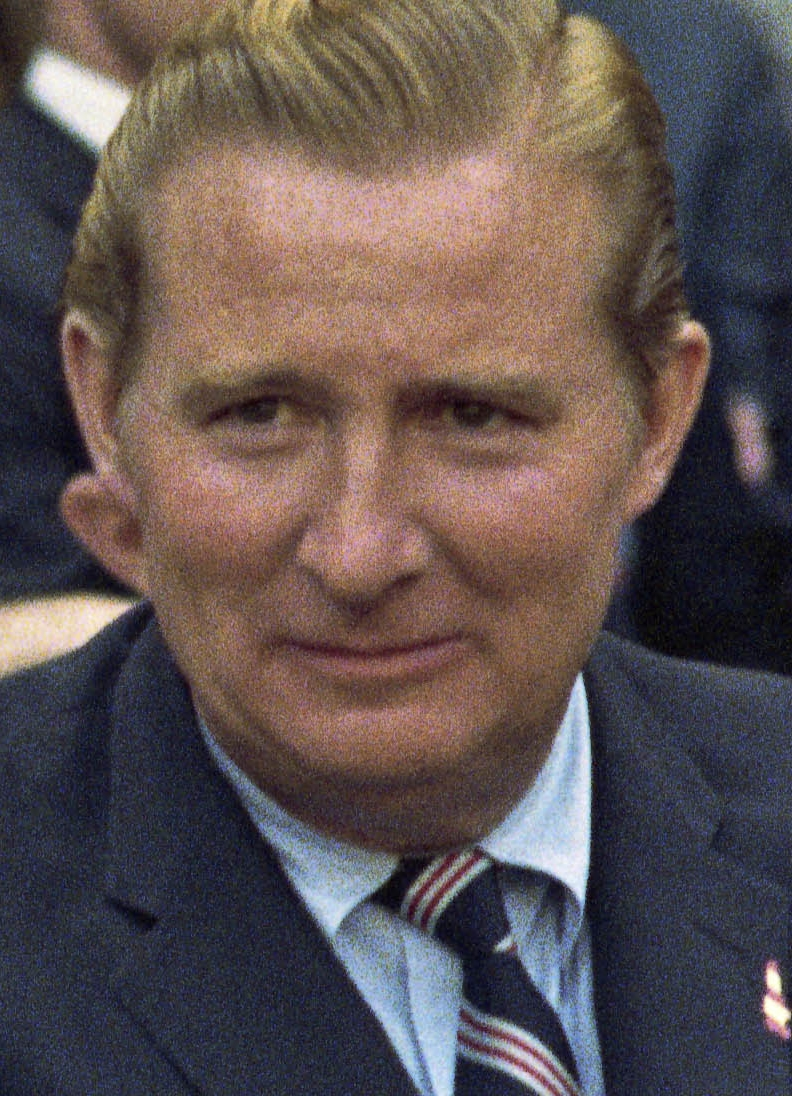
Nominee	David Durenberger	Bob Short
Party	Ind.-Republican	Democratic (DFL)
Popular vote	957,908	538,675
Percentage	61.47%	34.57%
- County results Durenberger: 40–50% 50–60% 60–70% 70–80% Short: 40–50% 50–60% 60–70%
U.S. senator before election
Muriel Humphrey
Democratic (DFL)
Elected U.S. senator
David Durenberger
Ind.-Republican

Incumbent Muriel Humphrey retired. Democratic candidate Bob Short was defeated by Republican candidate David Durenberger.

In 1978, all three key statewide races in Minnesota were up for election—the Governorship, and both Senate Seats (the other Senate seat belonged to Wendell Anderson, who, as Governor of Minnesota, appointed himself to fill the seat vacated by Walter Mondale, when Mondale ascended to the Vice Presidency in 1976). But, there was a particular oddity to the three races—all three had incumbents who were never elected to the office in the first place. This became a well played issue by the Republicans: a billboard put up across the state read, "The DFL is going to face something scary — an election".

When Hubert H. Humphrey died in office in January 1978, sitting Governor Rudy Perpich appointed Humphrey's widow, Muriel to sit until a special election could be held later that year. However, Muriel Humphrey opted not to seek election to the seat in her own right, and the DFL nominated former Texas Rangers owner Bob Short to run in the subsequent special election. The Independent-Republicans, on their part, nominated the liberal Republican David Durenberger, creating an unusual race in which the DFL candidate was positioned to the right of the Independent-Republican candidate. In addition to the general sense of dissatisfaction voters felt for the DFL, the DFL also had to contend with a large number of liberal members of the DFL, who were dissatisfied with Short's positions on hot button issues such as abortion, motorboat usage in the Boundary Waters Canoe area, and government spending, crossing party lines to vote for Durenberger. As a result, Durenberger won in a 26.9-percent landslide as the governorship and both U.S. Senate seats switched into Republican hands in what would be known as the "Minnesota Massacre".

Democratic special primary election
Party	Candidate	Votes	%
Democratic (DFL)	Bob Short	257,289	48.0%
Democratic (DFL)	Donald M. Fraser	253,818	47.4%
Democratic (DFL)	Sharon Anderson	16,094	3.0%
Democratic (DFL)	Richard A. Palmer	8,425	1.6%

Republican special primary election
Party	Candidate	Votes	%
Ind.-Republican	David Durenberger	139,187	67.3%
Ind.-Republican	Malcolm Moos	32,314	15.6%
Ind.-Republican	Ken Nordstrom	14,635	7.1%
Ind.-Republican	Will Lundquist	12,261	5.9%
Ind.-Republican	Adell H. Campbell	8,523	4.1%

Special election
Party	Candidate	Votes	%
Ind.-Republican	David Durenberger	957,908	61.47%
Democratic (DFL)	Bob Short	538,675	34.57%
American	Paul Helm	45,402	2.91%
Socialist Workers	Christine Frank	11,397	0.73%
Libertarian	Frederick Hewitt	4,116	0.26%
Others	Write-ins	878	0.06%
Majority		419,233	26.90%
Turnout		1,558,376	
Ind.-Republican gain from Democratic (DFL)			

== Mississippi ==
Mississippi election
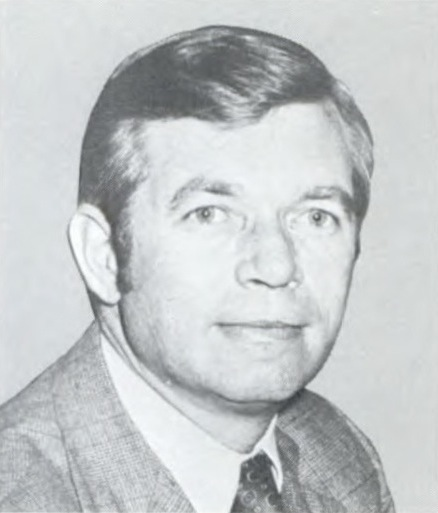

Nominee	Thad Cochran	Maurice Dantin
Party	Republican	Democratic
Popular vote	267,302	187,541
Percentage	45.3%	31.8%
Nominee	Charles Evers
Party	Independent
Popular vote	133,646
Percentage	22.6%
- County results Cochran: 30–40% 40–50% 50–60% 60–70% Dantin: 30–40% 40–50% 50–60% 60–70% 70–80% Evers: 30–40% 40–50% 50–60% 60–70% 70–80%
U.S. senator before election
James Eastland
Democratic
Elected U.S. Senator
Thad Cochran
Republican

Democrat James Eastland retired. Republican Thad Cochran won the open seat over Democrat Maurice Dantin, former District Attorney and Independent Charles Evers, Mayor of Fayette.

Evers was the first African American elected since the Reconstruction era to be mayor in any Mississippi city in 1969. He ran as an independent, and as a result his campaign divided the Democrats and allowed Cochran to win the senate seat with a 45 percent plurality. This made him the first Republican in a century to win a statewide election in Mississippi for any office except US President. Eastland resigned on December 27, 1978, to give Cochran a seniority advantage over new incoming senators.

Mississippi U.S. Senate Election, 1978
Party	Candidate	Votes	%
Republican	Thad Cochran	267,302	45.3%
Democratic	Maurice Dantin	187,541	31.8%
Independent	Charles Evers	133,646	22.6%
Independent	Henry Jay Kirksey	1,747	0.3%
Majority		79,761	13.52%
Turnout		590,236	
Republican gain from Democratic			

== Montana ==
Montana election
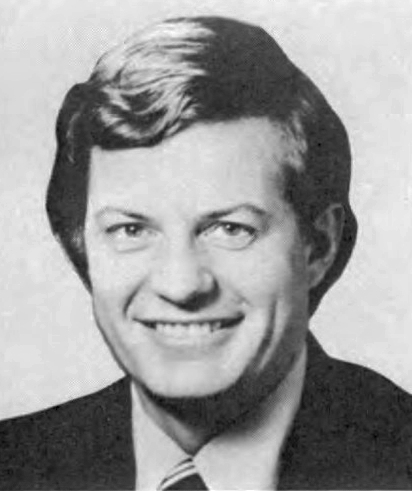

Nominee	Max Baucus	Larry R. Williams
Party	Democratic	Republican
Popular vote	160,353	127,589
Percentage	55.69%	44.31%
- County results Baucus: 50–60% 60–70% 70–80% Williams: 50–60% 60–70%
U.S. senator before election
Paul G. Hatfield
Democratic
Elected U.S. Senator
Max Baucus
Democratic

Following the death of senator Lee Metcalf on January 12, 1978, Montana Supreme Court Chief Justice Paul G. Hatfield was appointed to serve for the remainder of Metcalf's term. Hatfield opted to run for a full term in office, but was overwhelmingly defeated in the Democratic primary by Congressman Max Baucus of the 1st congressional district. Baucus advanced to the general election, where he was opposed by Larry R. Williams, an author and the Republican nominee. Baucus ended up defeating Williams by a solid margin to win his first term in the Senate, and, following Hatfield's resignation on December 12, 1978, he began serving his first term in the Senate.

Democratic Party primary
Party	Candidate	Votes	%
Democratic	Max Baucus	87,085	65.25%
Democratic	Paul G. Hatfield (Incumbent)	25,789	19.32%
Democratic	John Driscoll	18,184	13.62%
Democratic	Steve Shugrue	2,404	1.80%
Total votes		133,462	100.00%

Republican Primary
Party	Candidate	Votes	%
Republican	Larry R. Williams	35,479	61.66%
Republican	Bill Osborne	16,436	28.57%
Republican	Clancy Rich	5,622	9.77%
Total votes		57,537	100.00%

1978 United States Senate election in Montana
Party	Candidate	Votes	%	±%
Democratic	Max Baucus	160,353	55.69%	+3.74%
Republican	Larry R. Williams	127,589	44.31%	−3.74%
Majority		32,764	11.38%	+7.48%
Turnout		287,942		
Democratic hold		Swing		

== Nebraska ==
Nebraska election
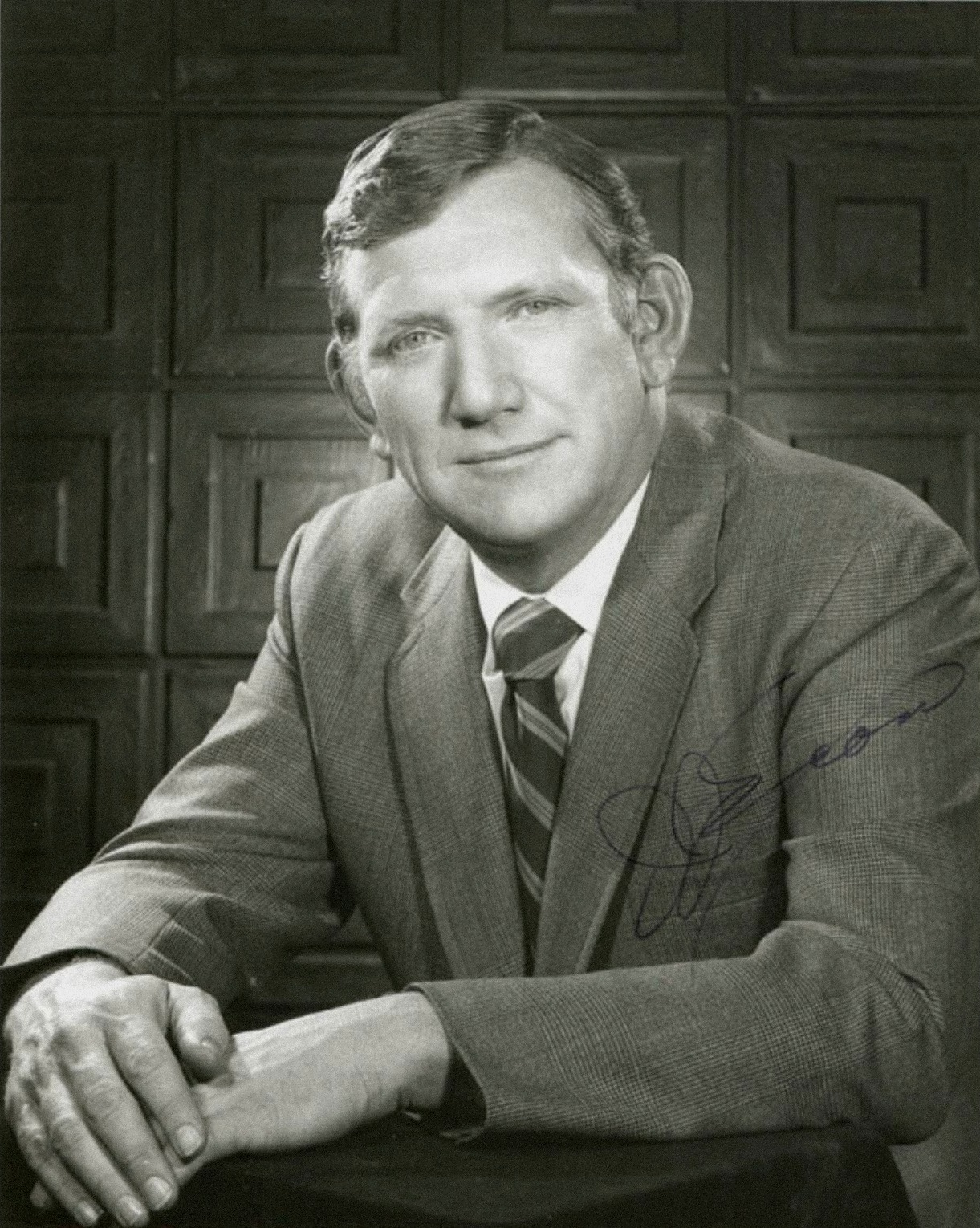

Nominee	J. James Exon	Donald Eugene Shasteen
Party	Democratic	Republican
Popular vote	334,096	159,708
Percentage	67.7%	32.3%
- County results Exon: 50–60% 60–70% 70–80% Shasteen: 50–60%
U.S. senator before election
Carl Curtis
Republican
Elected U.S. Senator
J. James Exon
Democratic

Republican Carl Curtis retired instead of seeking a fifth term. In the elections, Democratic nominee J. James Exon won the open seat over Republican Donald Eugene Shasteen.

General election
Party	Candidate	Votes	%	±%
Democratic	J. James Exon	334,096	67.66%	+20.82%
Republican	Donald Eugene Shasteen	159,708	32.34%	−20.82%
Majority		174,390	35.32%	+28.99%
Turnout		493,802		
Democratic gain from Republican		Swing		

== New Hampshire ==
New Hampshire election
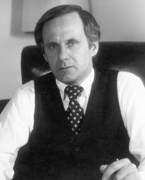

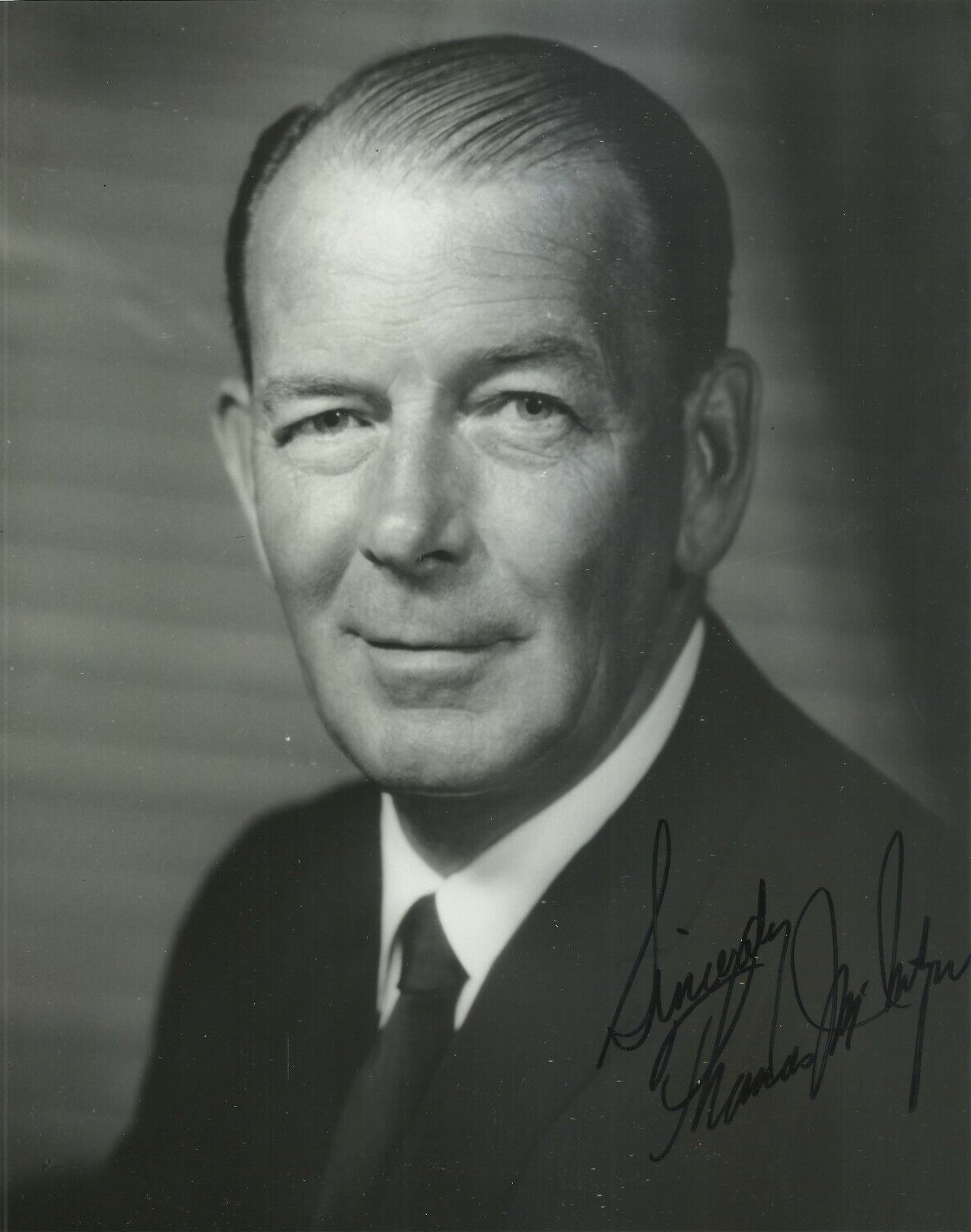
Nominee	Gordon J. Humphrey	Thomas J. McIntyre
Party	Republican	Democratic
Popular vote	133,745	127,945
Percentage	50.71%	48.51%
- County results Humphrey: 50–60% 60–70% McIntyre: 40–50% 50–60% 60–70%
U.S. senator before election
Thomas J. McIntyre
Democratic
Elected U.S. Senator
Gordon J. Humphrey
Republican

Incumbent Democrat Thomas J. McIntyre decided to run for re-election to a fourth term, but was defeated by Gordon J. Humphrey, the Republican nominee also a professional pilot and conservative activist.

1978 United States Senate election in New Hampshire
Party	Candidate	Votes	%
Republican	Gordon J. Humphrey	133,745	50.71%
Democratic	Thomas J. McIntyre (Incumbent)	127,945	48.51%
Libertarian	Craig Franklin	2,070	0.78%
Majority		5,800	2.20%
Turnout		263,760	
Republican gain from Democratic			

== New Jersey ==
New Jersey election
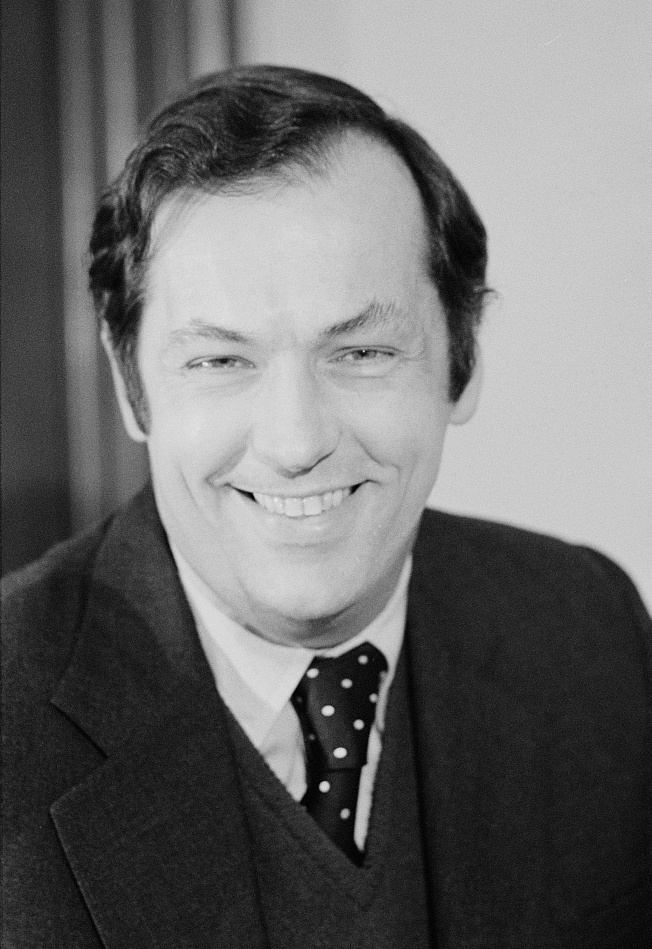

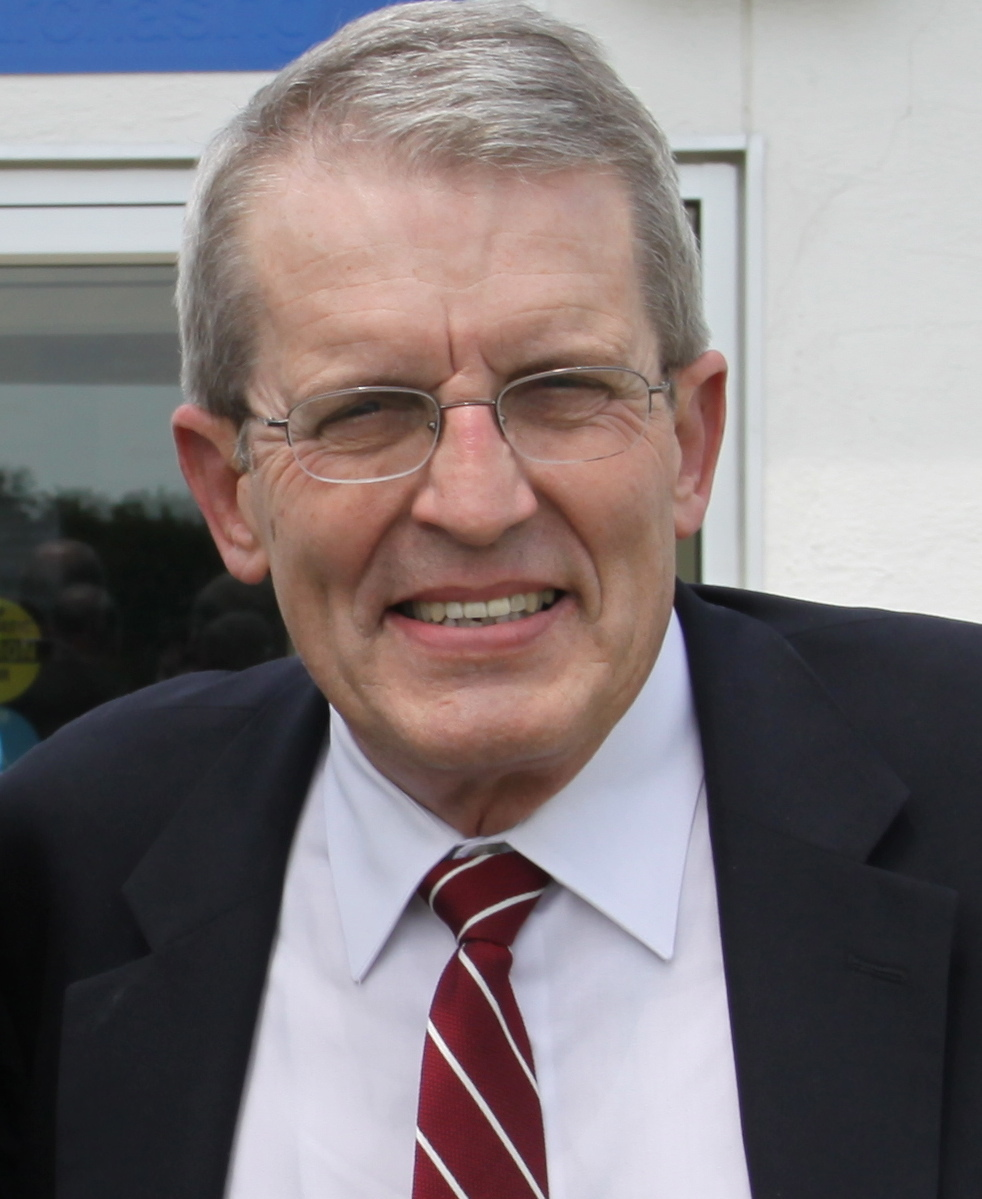
Nominee	Bill Bradley	Jeff Bell
Party	Democratic	Republican
Popular vote	1,082,960	844,200
Percentage	55.32%	43.13%
- County results Bradley: 50–60% 60–70% 70–80% Bell: 40–50% 50–60%
U.S. senator before election
Clifford P. Case
Republican
Elected U.S. Senator
Bill Bradley
Democratic

Republican Clifford P. Case narrowly lost renomination to anti-tax conservative Jeff Bell, but the Democratic nominee, former professional basketball player Bill Bradley, easily won the general election.

New Jersey Democratic primary
Party	Candidate	Votes	%
Democratic	Bill Bradley	217,502	58.90%
Democratic	Richard Leone	97,667	26.45%
Democratic	Alexander J. Menza	32,386	8.77%
Democratic	Kenneth C. McCarthy	9,524	2.58%
Democratic	Wesley K. Bell	8,800	2.38%
Democratic	Ray Rollinson	3,374	0.91%
Total votes		369,253	100.00%

Republican primary results
Party	Candidate	Votes	%
Republican	Jeff Bell	118,555	50.74%
Republican	Clifford P. Case (incumbent)	115,082	49.26%
Total votes		233,637	100.00%

New Jersey general election
Party	Candidate	Votes	%
Democratic	Bill Bradley	1,082,960	55.32%
Republican	Jeff Bell	844,200	43.13%
Independent	Herbert H. Shaw	4,736	0.24%
Independent	Bill Gahres	3,817	0.19%
Independent	Jack Moyers	3,809	0.19%
U.S. Labor	Robert Bowen	3,656	0.19%
Independent	J. M. Carter Jr.	3,618	0.18%
Independent	Jasper C. Gould	2,955	0.15%
Independent	William R. Thorn	2,776	0.14%
Independent	Paul Ferguson	2,604	0.13%
Independent	Alice Conner	2,384	0.12%
Majority		238,760	12.19%
Turnout		1,957,515	
Democratic gain from Republican			

== New Mexico ==
New Mexico election
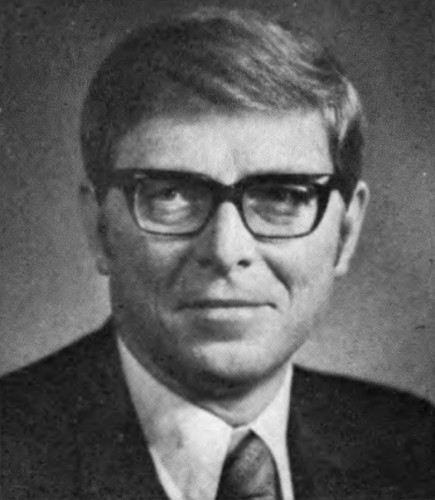

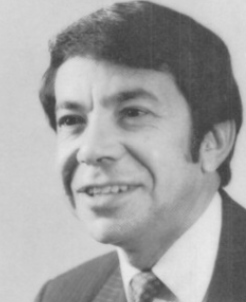
Nominee	Pete Domenici	Toney Anaya
Party	Republican	Democratic
Popular vote	183,442	160,045
Percentage	53.4%	46.6%
- County results Domenici: 50–60% 60–70% 70–80% Anaya: 50–60% 60–70%
U.S. senator before election
Pete Domenici
Republican
Elected U.S. Senator
Pete Domenici
Republican

Republican senator Pete Domenici successfully ran for re-election to a second term, defeating Democrat Toney Anaya, Attorney General of New Mexico.

General election
Party	Candidate	Votes	%
Republican	Pete Domenici (Incumbent)	183,442	53.41%
Democratic	Toney Anaya	160,045	46.59%
Majority		23,397	6.81%
Total votes		343,487	100.00%
Republican hold			

== North Carolina ==
North Carolina election
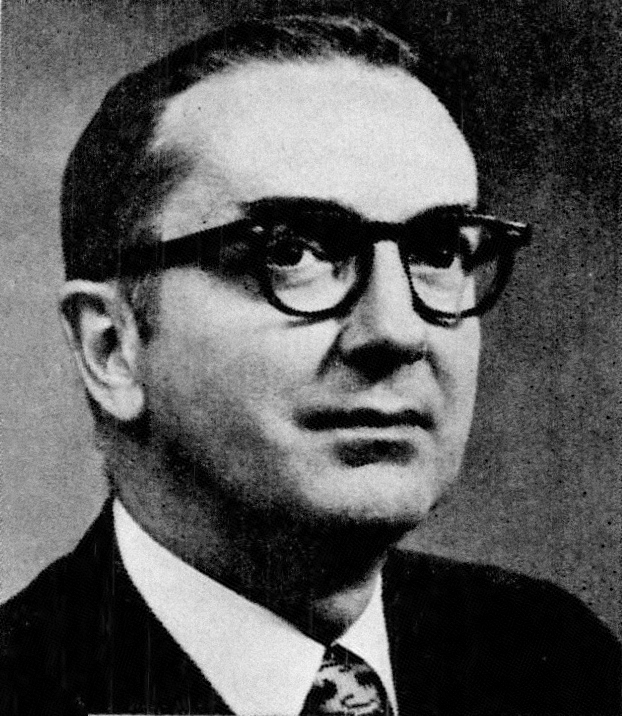

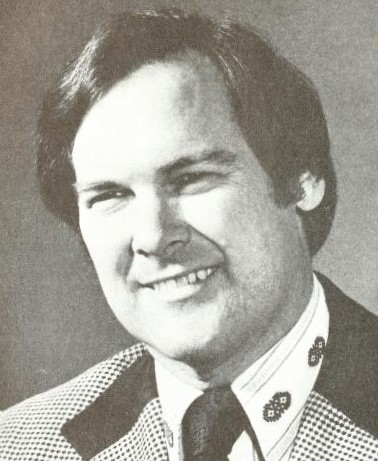
Nominee	Jesse Helms	John Ingram
Party	Republican	Democratic
Popular vote	619,151	516,663
Percentage	54.5%	45.5%
- County results Helms: 50– 60% 60–70% 70–80% Ingram: 50–60% 60–70%
U.S. senator before election
Jesse Helms
Republican
Elected U.S. Senator
Jesse Helms
Republican

The general election was fought between the Republican Incumbent Jesse Helms and Democrat John Ingram. Helms won re-election, by a slightly wider margin than in 1972.

1978 North Carolina U.S. Senate Democratic primary election – First round
Party	Candidate	Votes	%
Democratic	Luther H. Hodges Jr.	260,868	40.08%
Democratic	John Ingram	170,715	26.23%
Democratic	Lawrence Davis	105,381	16.19%
Democratic	McNeill Smith	82,703	12.71%
Democratic	Dave McKnight	9,422	1.45%
Democratic	William Griffin	8,907	1.37%
Democratic	Tom Sawyer	8,482	1.30%
Turnout		650,942	

1978 North Carolina U.S. Senate Democratic primary election – Second round
Party	Candidate	Votes	%	±%
Democratic	John Ingram	244,469	54.24%	+28.01%
Democratic	Luther H. Hodges Jr.	206,223	45.76%	+5.68%
Turnout		450,692		

Jesse Helms won the Republican Party's nomination unopposed.

1978 North Carolina U.S. Senate election
Party	Candidate	Votes	%	±%
Republican	Jesse Helms (Incumbent)	619,151	54.51%	+0.50%
Democratic	John Ingram	516,663	45.49%	−0.50%
Turnout		1,135,814		

== Oklahoma ==
Oklahoma election
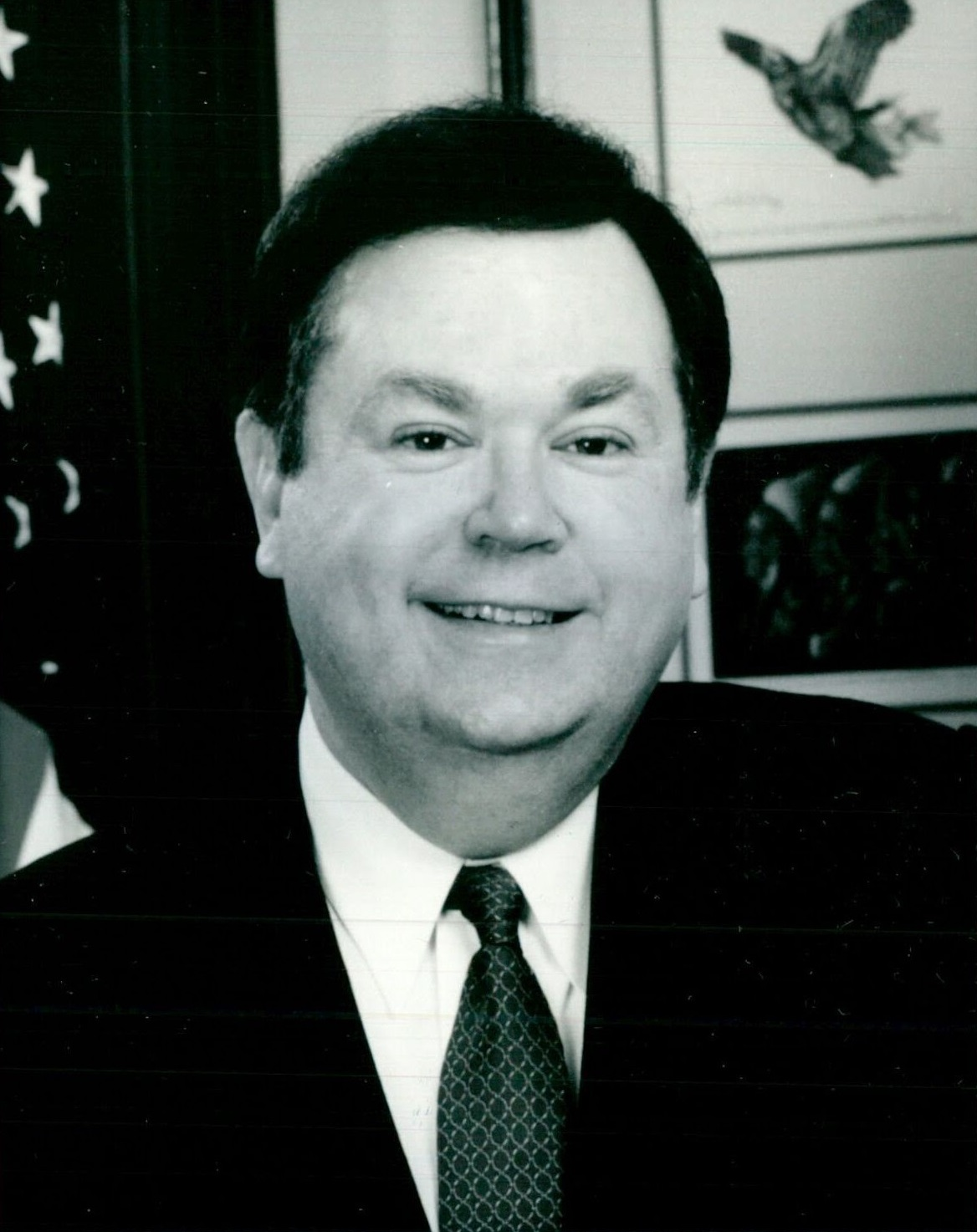

Nominee	David Boren	Robert B. Kamm
Party	Democratic	Republican
Popular vote	493,953	247,857
Percentage	65.49%	32.86%
- County results Boren: 50–60% 60–70% 70–80% 80–90% Kamm: 40–50% 50–60%
U.S. senator before election
Dewey F. Bartlett
Republican
Elected U.S. Senator
David Boren
Democratic

Republican Dewey F. Bartlett retired instead of seeking a second term due to his declining health. In the elections, Democratic nominee David Boren won the open seat over Republican Robert B. Kamm.

1978 United States Senate election in Oklahoma
Party	Candidate	Votes	%
Democratic	David Boren	493,953	65.49%
Republican	Robert B. Kamm	247,857	32.86%
Independent	Glenn E. Hager	3,875	0.51%
Independent	Riley Donica	3,355	0.44%
Independent	Paul Edward Trent	3,015	0.40%
Independent	Richard King Carter	2,209	0.29%
Majority		246,096	32.63%
Turnout		754,264	
Democratic gain from Republican			

Bartlett died 2 months after leaving the U.S. Senate

== Oregon ==
Oregon election
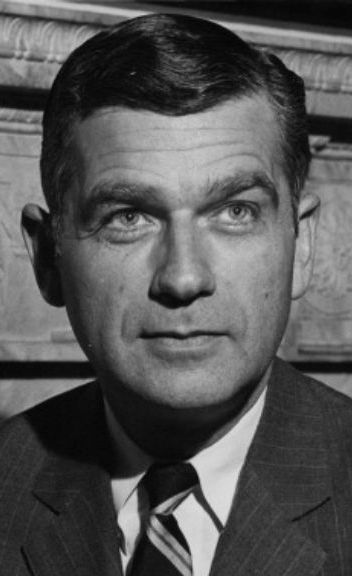

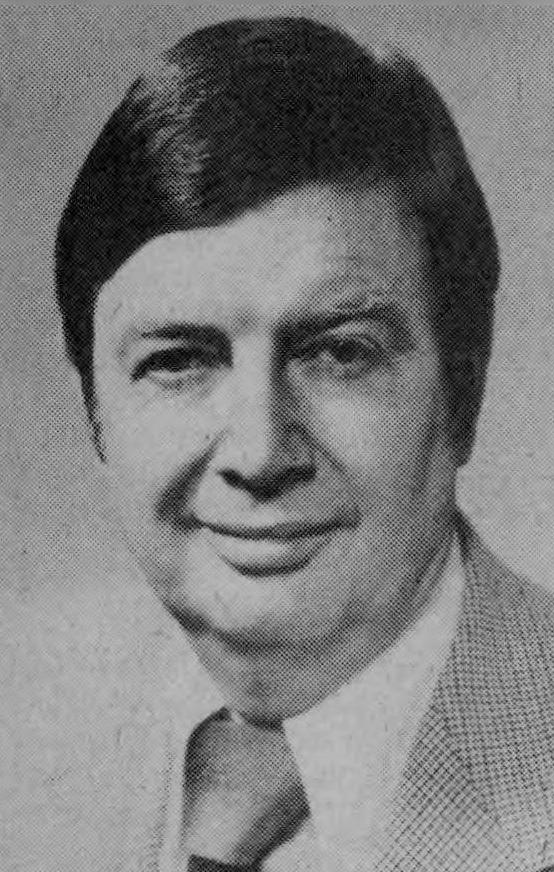
Nominee	Mark Hatfield	Vernon Cook
Party	Republican	Democratic
Popular vote	550,615	341,616
Percentage	61.66%	38.26%
- County results Hatfield: 50–60% 60–70% 70–80% Cook: 50–60%
U.S. senator before election
Mark Hatfield
Republican
Elected U.S. Senator
Mark Hatfield
Republican

Republican senator Mark Hatfield successfully ran for re-election to a third term, defeating Democrat Vernon Cook, State Legislator and candidate for U.S. Representative in 1970 and 1974.

1978 United States Senate election in Oregon
Party	Candidate	Votes	%
Republican	Mark Hatfield (Incumbent)	550,165	61.64%
Democratic	Vernon Cook	341,616	38.28%
Independent	Write-Ins	737	0.08%
Majority		208,549	23.36%
Turnout		892,518	
Republican hold			

== Rhode Island ==
Rhode Island election
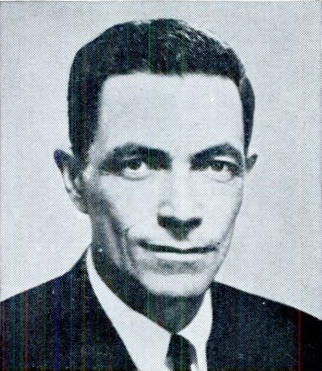

Nominee	Claiborne Pell	James G. Reynolds
Party	Democratic	Republican
Popular vote	229,557	76,061
Percentage	75.1%	24.9%
- Pell: 50–60% 60–70% 70–80% 80–90%
U.S. senator before election
Claiborne Pell
Democratic
Elected U.S. Senator
Claiborne Pell
Democratic

Democrat Claiborne Pell successfully sought re-election, defeating Republican James G. Reynolds.

Democratic primary
Party	Candidate	Votes	%
Democratic	Claiborne Pell (Incumbent)	69,729	87.01%
Democratic	Raymond J. Greiner	6,076	7.58%
Democratic	Francis P. Kelley	4,330	5.41%
Majority		63,653	79.43%
Total votes		80,135	100.00%

General election
Party	Candidate	Votes	%
Democratic	Claiborne Pell (Incumbent)	229,557	75.11%
Republican	James G. Reynolds	76,061	24.89%
Majority		153,496	50.22%
Total votes		305,618	100.00%
Democratic hold			

== South Carolina ==
South Carolina election
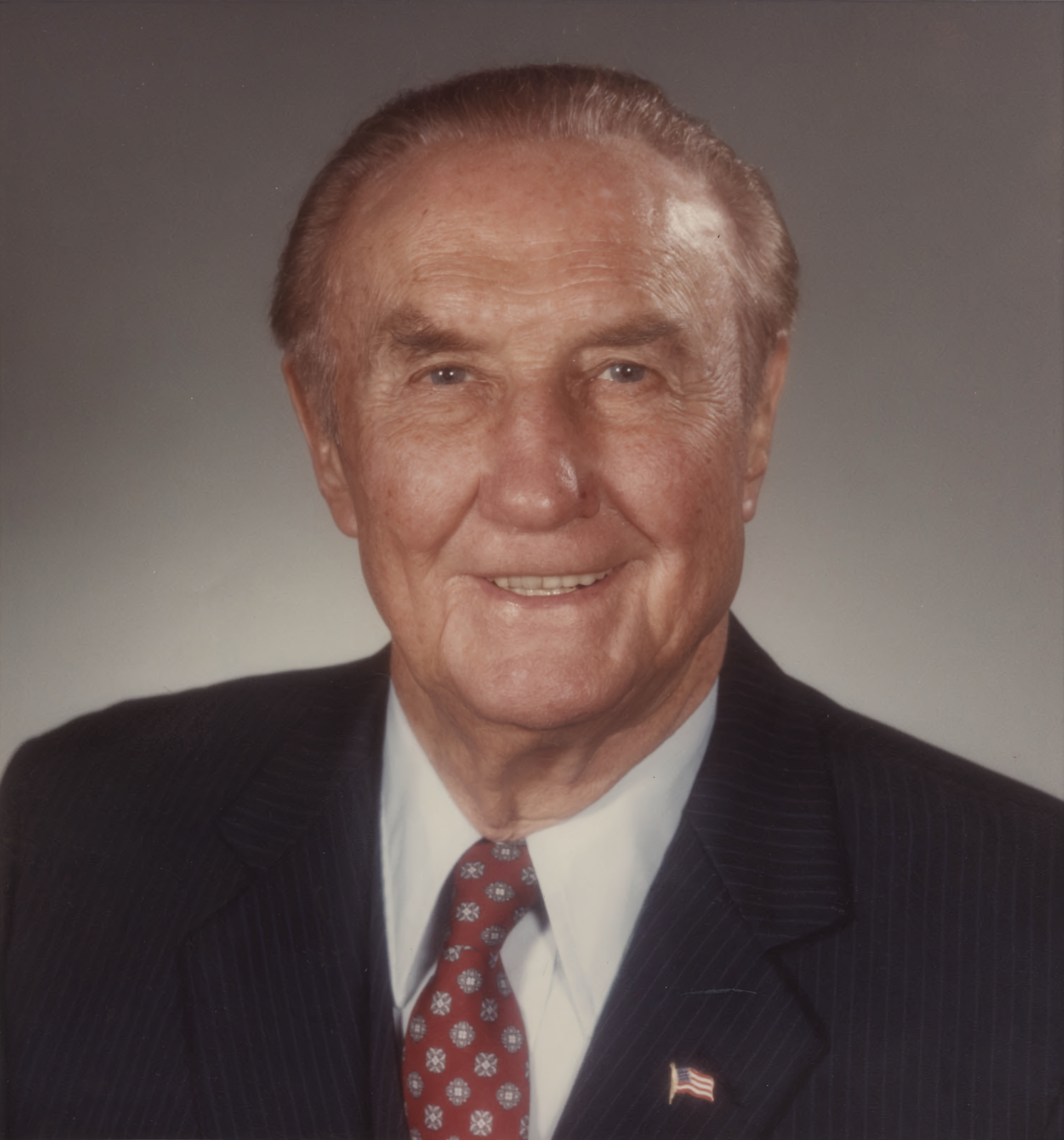

Nominee	Strom Thurmond	Charles D. Ravenel
Party	Republican	Democratic
Popular vote	351,733	281,119
Percentage	55.6%	44.4%
- County results Thurmond: 50–60% 60–70% 70–80% Ravenel: 50–60%
U.S. senator before election
Strom Thurmond
Republican
Elected U.S. Senator
Strom Thurmond
Republican

Popular incumbent Republican Strom Thurmond defeated Democratic challenger Charles D. Ravenel.

The South Carolina Democratic Party held their primary for governor on June 13, 1978. Charles D. Ravenel, an unsuccessful candidate in the 1974 gubernatorial contest, originally planned to run for governor again in 1978, but was convinced by Vice President Walter Mondale in 1977 to run for senator. He garnered over 50% of the vote in the primary and avoided a runoff election.

South Carolina Democratic primary
Party	Candidate	Votes	%	±%
Democratic	Charles D. Ravenel	205,348	55.9%	
Democratic	John Bolt Culbertson	69,184	18.9%	
Democratic	Tom Triplett	50,957	13.9%	
Democratic	Tom McElveen	41,550	11.3%	

Senator Strom Thurmond faced no opposition from South Carolina Republicans and avoided a primary election.

Thurmond generally ignored Ravenel on the campaign and refused to debate him. When they did cross paths, Thurmond criticized Ravenel for never having held a political office. Ravenel did not help his cause by his actions in the 1974 gubernatorial race when he refused to endorse the Democratic nominee after he had been disqualified. This irritated many Democrats and they also accused him of being nothing more than a liberal New Yorker. Age was beginning to become an issue with Thurmond, so to combat perceptions of old age, Thurmond often appeared with his children on the campaign trail. While 1978 was generally a Democratic year, Thurmond was able to pull off a commanding victory over Ravenel.

South Carolina general election
Party	Candidate	Votes	%	±%
Republican	Strom Thurmond (Incumbent)	351,733	55.6%	−7.9%
Democratic	Charles D. Ravenel	281,119	44.4%	+7.9%
No party	Write-Ins	257	0.0%	0.0%
Majority		70,614	11.2%	−15.8%
Turnout		633,109	57.7%	−7.5%
Republican hold		Swing		

== South Dakota ==
South Dakota election
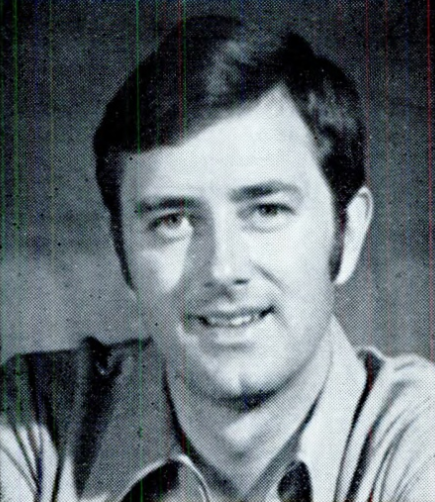

Nominee	Larry Pressler	Don Barnett
Party	Republican	Democratic
Popular vote	170,832	84,767
Percentage	66.84%	33.16%
- County results Pressler: 50-60% 60-70% 70-80% 80–90% Barnett: 50–60% 60–70% 70–80%
U.S. senator before election
James Abourezk
Democratic
Elected U.S. Senator
Larry Pressler
Republican

Incumbent Democrat James Abourezk retired instead of seeking a second term. In the elections, Republican congressman Larry Pressler won the open seat over Democratic former mayor of Rapid City Don Barnett, thus becoming the first Vietnam veteran to serve in the Senate

1978 United States Senate election in South Dakota
Party	Candidate	Votes	%
Republican	Larry Pressler	170,832	66.84%
Democratic	Don Barnett	84,767	33.16%
Majority		86,065	33.68%
Turnout		255,599	
Republican gain from Democratic			

== Tennessee ==
Tennessee election
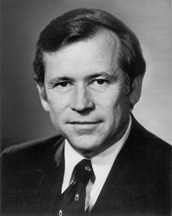

Nominee	Howard Baker	Jane Eskind
Party	Republican	Democratic
Popular vote	642,644	466,228
Percentage	55.54%	40.30%
- County results Baker: 50–60% 60–70% 70–80% Eskind: 50–60% 60–70%
U.S. senator before election
Howard Baker
Republican
Elected U.S. Senator
Howard Baker
Republican

Two-term popular incumbent Howard Baker, who had served as United States Senate Minority Leader since 1977, ran for reelection against first-time candidate and Democratic Party activist Jane Eskind.

In the August 3 Democratic primary Eskind won in an open primary against eight other candidates:

- Eskind - 196,156 (34.52%)
- Bruce - 170,795 (30.06%)
- Lee - 89,939 (15.83%)
- Boyd - 48,458 (8.53%)
- Bradley - 22,130 (3.90%)
- Heinsohn - 17,787 (3.13%)
- Foster - 10,671 (1.88%)
- Nyabongo - 7,682 (1.35%)
- Vick - 4,414 (0.78%)
- Write-in - 147 (0.03%)

In the Republican primary, also held August 3, Baker easily emerged as the winner:

- Baker - 205,680 (83.44%)
- Howard - 21,154 (8.58%)
- Boles - 8,899 (3.61%)
- Patty - 3,941 (1.60%)
- Seiler - 3,831 (1.55%)
- Trapp - 2,994 (1.22%)

Baker won with a 15-point margin in the general election, held on November 7:

General election
Party	Candidate	Votes	%
Republican	Howard Baker (Incumbent)	642,644	55.54%
Democratic	Jane Eskind	466,228	40.29%
Independent	Thomas J. Anderson	45,908	3.97%
Independent	Fern L. Keasler	2,243	0.19%
None	Write-Ins	71	0.01%
Majority		176,416	15.25%
Turnout		1,157,094	
Republican hold			

== Texas ==
Texas election
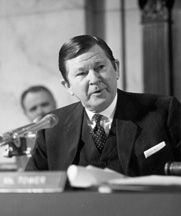

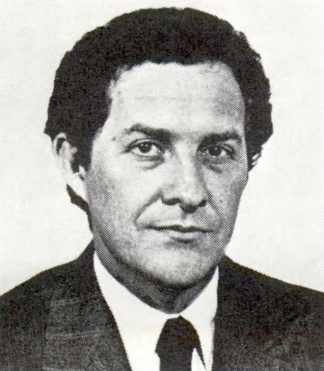
Nominee	John Tower	Bob Krueger
Party	Republican	Democratic
Popular vote	1,151,376	1,139,149
Percentage	49.8%	49.3%
- County results Tower: 50–60% 60–70% 70–80% Krueger: 50–60% 60–70% 70–80% 80–90% Tie: 50–60%
U.S. senator before election
John Tower
Republican
Elected U.S. Senator
John Tower
Republican

Republican incumbent John Tower won re-election to a fourth term over Democrat Bob Krueger, U.S. Congressman of Texas's 21st congressional district.

General election
Party	Candidate	Votes	%
Republican	John Tower (Incumbent)	1,151,376	49.8%
Democratic	Bob Krueger	1,139,149	49.3%
Raza Unida	Luis A. Diaz de Leon	17,869	0.8%
Socialist Workers	Miguel Pendas	4,018	0.2%
None	Others	128	0.0%
Majority		12,227	0.5%
Turnout		2,312,540	
Republican hold			

== Virginia ==
Virginia election
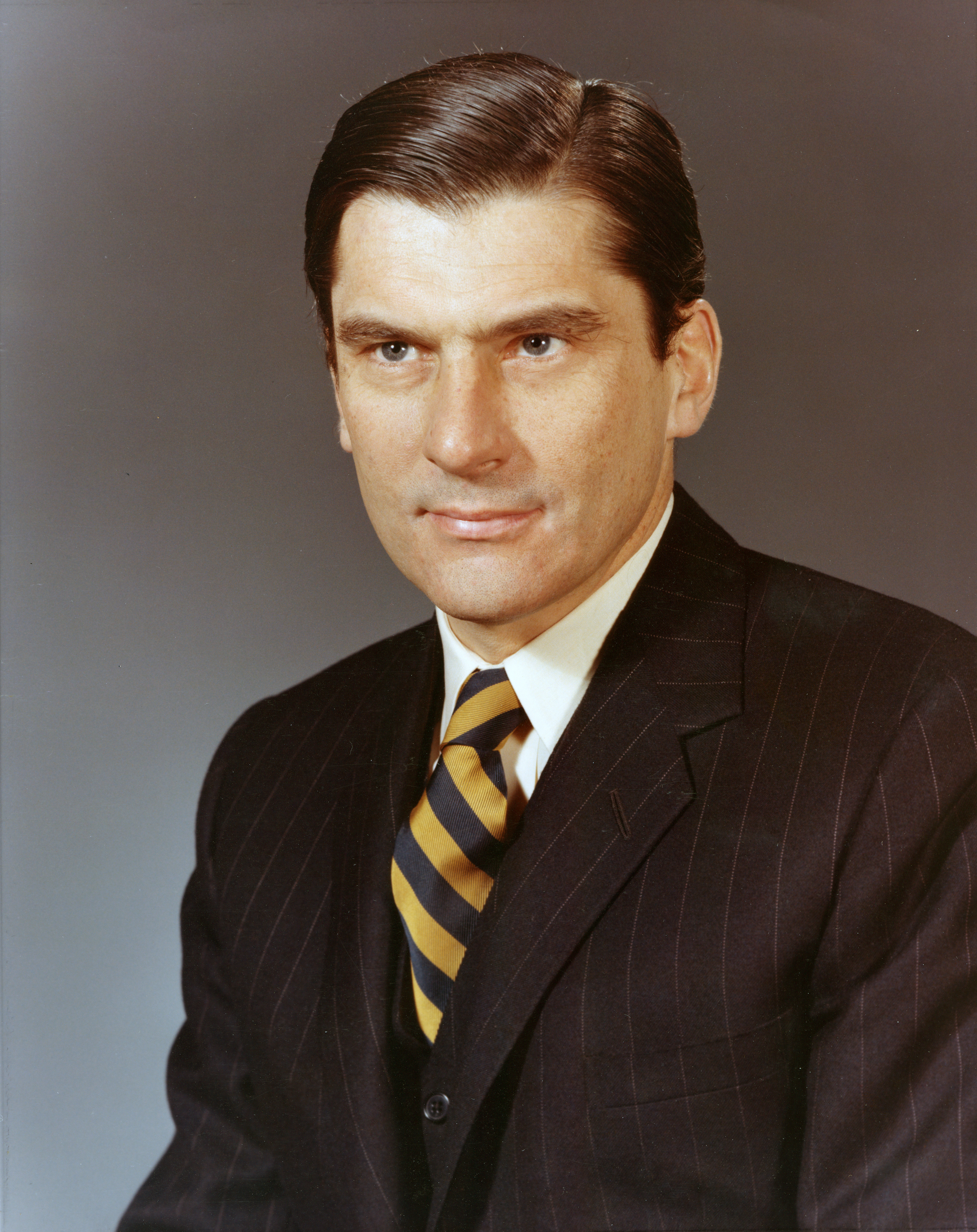

Nominee	John Warner	Andrew P. Miller
Party	Republican	Democratic
Popular vote	613,232	608,511
Percentage	50.2%	49.8%
- County and independent city results Warner: 50–60% 60–70% Miller: 50–60% 60–70% 70–80%
U.S. senator before election
William L. Scott
Republican
Elected U.S. Senator
John Warner
Republican

Incumbent William L. Scott retired. Former Secretary of the Navy Republican John Warner beat Attorney General of Virginia Andrew P. Miller. Scott then resigned January 1, 1979 and Warner was appointed January 2, 1979 for early seniority purposes.

1978 United States Senate election in Virginia
Party	Candidate	Votes	%	±%
Republican	John Warner	613,232	50.17%	−1.28%
Democratic	Andrew P. Miller	608,511	49.79%	+3.67%
Write-ins		513	0.04%	+0.04%
Majority		4,721	0.39%	+0.39%
Turnout		1,222,256		
Republican hold				

== West Virginia ==
West Virginia election
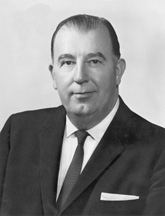

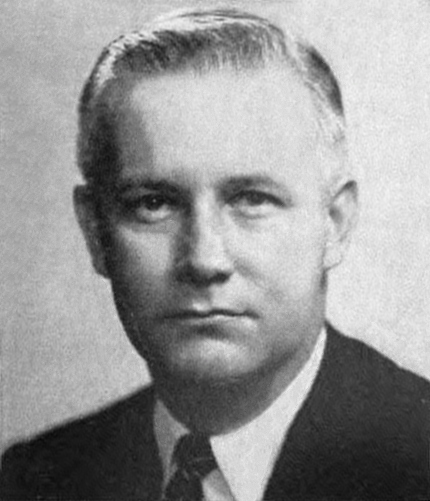
Nominee	Jennings Randolph	Arch Moore
Party	Democratic	Republican
Popular vote	249,034	244,317
Percentage	50.48%	49.52%
- County results Randolph: 50–60% 60–70% Moore: 50–60% 60–70% 70-80%
U.S. senator before election
Jennings Randolph
Democratic
Elected U.S. Senator
Jennings Randolph
Democratic

Democratic incumbent Jennings Randolph won re-election to a fifth term over Republican Arch Moore, former governor of West Virginia.

1978 United States Senate election in West Virginia
Party	Candidate	Votes	%
Democratic	Jennings Randolph (Incumbent)	249,034	50.48%
Republican	Arch A. Moore Jr.	244,317	49.52%
Majority		4,717	0.92%
Turnout		493,351	
Democratic hold			

== Wyoming ==
Wyoming election
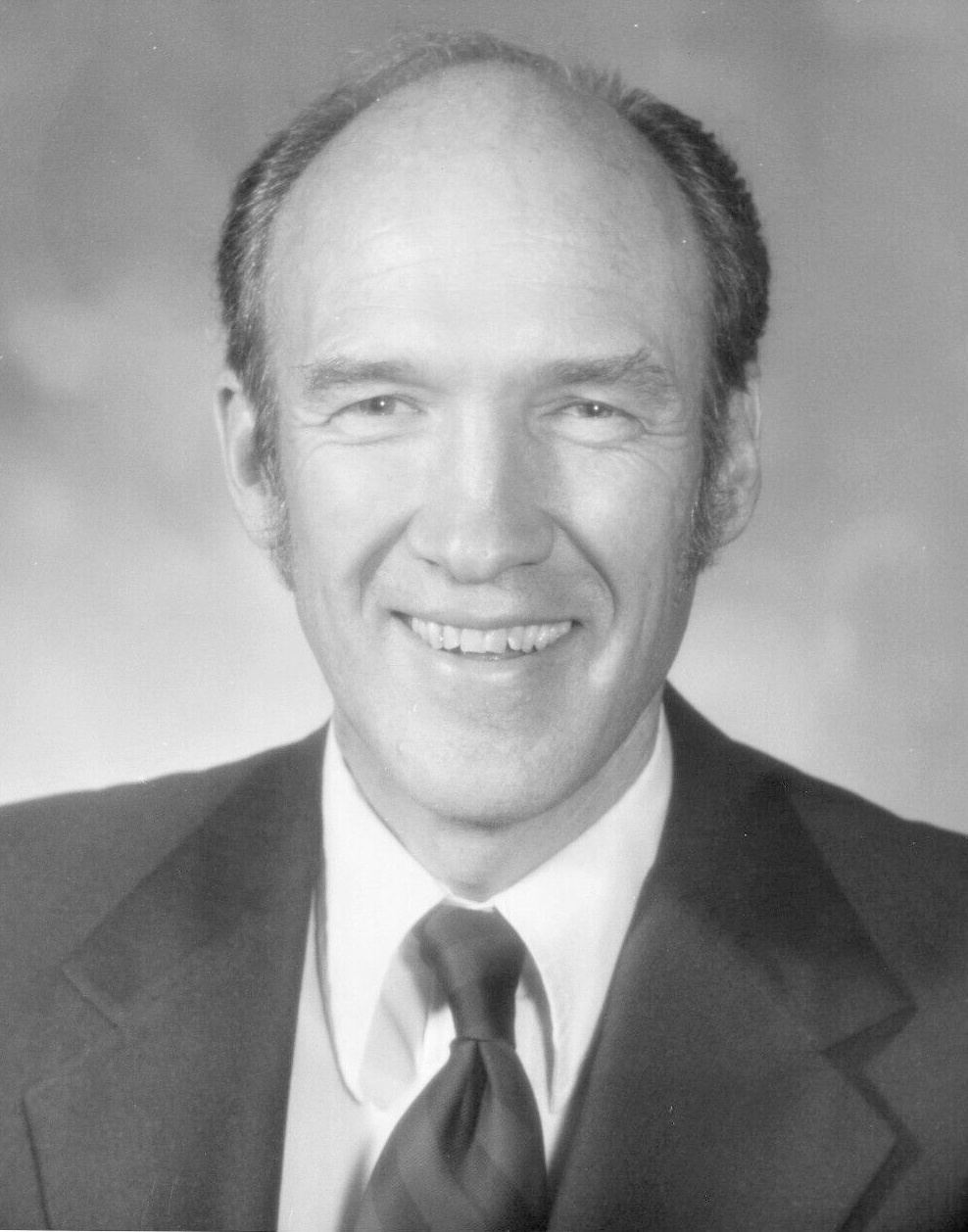

Nominee	Alan K. Simpson	Raymond B. Whitaker
Party	Republican	Democratic
Popular vote	82,908	50,456
Percentage	62.17%	37.83%
- County results Simpson: 50–60% 60–70% 70–80% Whitaker: 50–60%
U.S. senator before election
Clifford Hansen
Republican
Elected U.S. Senator
Alan K. Simpson
Republican

Incumbent Republican Clifford Hansen retired instead of seeking a third term. In the elections, Republican nominee Alan K. Simpson won the open seat over Democrat Raymond B. Whitaker, an attorney from Casper and nominee for U.S. Senate in 1960.

1978 United States Senate election in Wyoming
Party	Candidate	Votes	%
Republican	Alan Simpson	82,908	62.17%
Democratic	Raymond B. Whitaker	50,456	37.83%
Majority		32,452	24.34%
Turnout		133,364	
Republican hold			

== See also ==
- 1978 United States elections
  - 1978 United States gubernatorial elections
  - 1978 United States House of Representatives elections
- 95th United States Congress
- 96th United States Congress
