= 1978 United States Senate election in Idaho =

- November 7, 1978
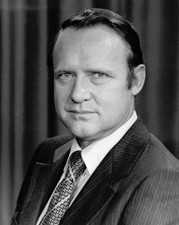

| Nominee | Jim McClure | Dwight Jensen |
| Party | Republican | Democratic |
| Popular vote | 194,412 | 89,635 |
| Percentage | 68.44% | 31.56% |
- County results McClure: 50–60% 60–70% 70–80% 80–90%
U.S. senator before election
James McClure
Republican
Elected U.S. Senator
James McClure
Republican

The 1978 United States Senate election in Idaho took place on November 7. Incumbent Republican Senator Jim McClure was re-elected to a second term in office, defeating little-known Democrat Dwight Jensen, a journalist and television news anchor in Boise.

== General election ==
=== Results ===
General election results
| Party | Candidate | Votes | % | ±% |
|---|---|---|---|---|
| Republican | Jim McClure (incumbent) | 194,412 | 68.4% | ▲16.2 |
| Democratic | Dwight Jensen | 89,635 | 31.6% | ▼14.0 |
| Total votes | | 284,047 | 100.0% | |
| Republican hold | | Swing | | |

== See also ==
- 1978 United States Senate elections
