= Dwight Jensen =

American politician in Idaho (1934–2006)

Dwight William Jensen (September 4, 1934 – February 26, 2006) was the 1978 Democratic nominee for United States Senate in Idaho. He was defeated by the Republican incumbent, Jim McClure. He died in 2006 after a long battle with supranuclear palsy and multiple system atrophy.

Party political offices
Preceded by William E. Davis	Democratic Party nominee, U.S. Senator (Class 2) from Idaho; 1978 (lost)	Succeeded by Peter M. Busch
