= Eagle Battalion ROTC =

The Army ROTC Eagle Battalion is a Military Science program at Georgia Southern University. The Eagle Battalion is a part of the 6th Brigade, U.S. Army Cadet Command. Georgia Southern University serves as the host school for East Georgia State College, Savannah State University, Armstrong State University, and Savannah College of Art and Design.

During the 2009–2010 academic year at Georgia Southern University, the ROTC program graduated and commissioned seven nursing major cadets. Seeing as there is a high demand for nurses in the Army, this accomplishment was deeply recognized. The ROTC Program at Georgia Southern is notably ranked to be "the largest producer of nurse officers [out of] the 39 ROTC programs in the 6th Brigade." The Brigade Region stretches from Louisiana to Florida, and includes Puerto Rico and the US Virgin Islands. The Eagle Battalion ROTC program is also one of the few Army ROTC programs to offer the Simultaneous Membership Program (SMP) with the Georgia Army National Guard and the US Army Reserves, giving the Cadets a chance to embark on an even greater journey while still attending college.

Eagle Battalion ROTC
6th Brigade
Georgia Southern University: host school
East Georgia State College
Savannah State University
Armstrong State University
Savannah College of Art and Design

The Eagle Battalion Army ROTC (Reserve Officer Training Corps) was established in 1980 at the former Georgia Southern College. The program was started following a petition by the student body at the time, and an approval from the college president, Dr. Lick. Shortly after the approval, the program became part of the Military Science Department at Mercer University. In the fall of 1980, the first Army ROTC classes were held at Georgia Southern College. By October 1981, the program had received a "host status", and was no longer a part of Mercer University. LTC James C. Hare, Jr. became the first Professor of Military Science at Georgia Southern.

The Eagle Battalion ROTC program takes in first-year college freshmen, whether they be on scholarship or not, and prepares them to be 2LT Officers in the Army throughout the four years they attend Georgia Southern. Freshman Cadets start off by taking MS I classes and end with MS IV. While in the program, Cadets will be taught the significant difference in being a soldier and a civilian. Cadets will learn the Cadet creed and the Soldier's Creed, as well as earn a minor in Military Science that counts towards his or her bachelor's degree.

To date, The Eagle Battalion, with the help of Georgia Southern University, has commissioned over 570 Officers into the United States Army since the program was started. The current Scholarship and Enrollment Officer for the Eagle Battalion is Keenan Gamble.

The current Professor of Military Science is LTC Nancy Tucker. MSG Chris Decker serves as the Senior Military Instructor.
