= Luck Flanders Gambrell =

American philanthropist

- Born: Luck Coleman Flanders; January 17, 1930; Swainsboro, Georgia
- Died: June 29, 2015 (aged 85)
- Education: Duke University (1950)
- Spouse: David H. Gambrell (m. 1953; died 2015)
- Children: Luck Jr.; Henry; Alice; Mary

Luck Flanders Gambrell (January 17, 1930 – June 29, 2015) was an American philanthropist.

Luck Coleman Flanders was born in Swainsboro on January 17, 1930 to Mattie Moring Mitchell Flanders and William Henry Flanders.

Gambrell attended Duke University and graduated in 1950. She also studied briefly at the University of Tours and the University of Fribourg.

On October 16, 1953, she married attorney David H. Gambrell, who briefly served as a US senator in the early 1970s. The couple moved to Atlanta, where she taught French at The Westminster Schools. Gambrell also was part of the Atlanta Legal Aid Society and campaigned for her husband in his unsuccessful runs for reelection in 1972 and governor in 1974.

Gambrell donated 190 acres (77 ha) of land in 1971 to be used for East Georgia College. The college named the Luck Flanders Gambrell Center after her in 2001.

Gambrell was the first woman appointed to the Georgia Board of Public Safety by Georgia governor George Busbee; she served from 1981 to 1990.

Gambrell died on June 29, 2015.

Gambrell was inducted into the Georgia Women of Achievement in 2023.
