= Fletcher Thompson =

American politician from Georgia (1925–2022)

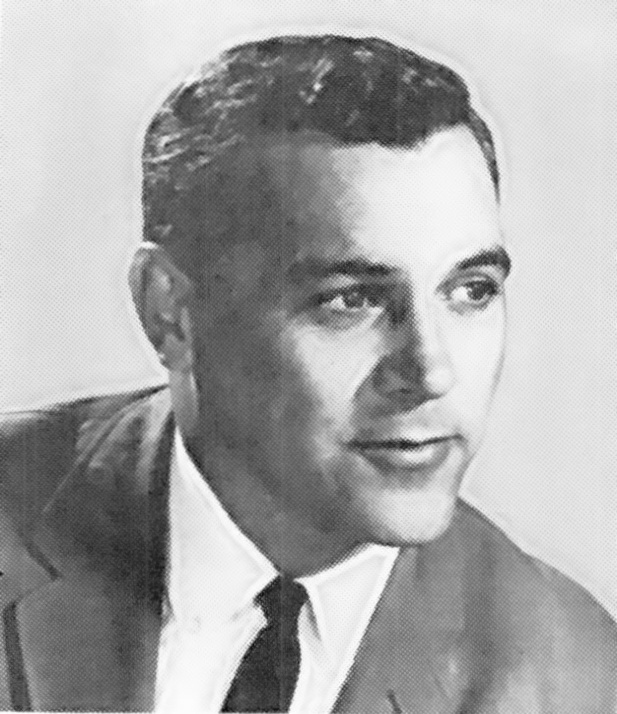

Member of the U.S. House of Representatives from Georgia's 5th district
- In office January 3, 1967 – January 3, 1973
- Preceded by: Charles Weltner
- Succeeded by: Andrew Young

Member of the Georgia Senate from the 34th district
- In office January 11, 1965 – January 9, 1967
- Preceded by: Charlie Brown
- Succeeded by: W. Armstrong Smith

Personal details
- Born: Standish Fletcher Thompson; February 5, 1925 College Park, Georgia, U.S.
- Died: September 13, 2022 (aged 97) Marietta, Georgia, U.S.
- Party: Republican
- Spouse: Kathryn Cochran (m. 1946; died 2022)
- Children: 2
- Education: Emory University (AB); Woodrow Wilson College of Law (LLB)
- Occupation: Lawyer, politician

Military service
- Allegiance: United States
- Branch/service: United States Army; United States Air Force
- Years of service: 1943–1953
- Unit: U.S. Army Air Corps
- Battles/wars: World War II; Korean War

Standish Fletcher Thompson (February 5, 1925 – September 13, 2022) was an American lawyer, World War II veteran and Republican politician who served as a member of the United States House of Representatives from 1967 to 1973 from the 5th congressional district of Georgia.

== Early life ==
Thompson was born near Atlanta in College Park in Fulton County, Georgia. He graduated from Russell High School in East Point, Georgia. While at Russell High School, Thompson was the president of the Model Airplane Club.

== Military service ==
Thompson completed Basic Training with the 90th Infantry Division before he was transferred to the Aviation Cadet Training Program in Wichita Falls, Texas. Thompson qualified as both a pilot and as a navigator. A growing need for Army Air Corps navigators resulted in his assignment as a navigator within the 6th Emergency Air-sea Rescue Squadron. Over the next several years, Thompson would earn seven service stars along with an Asiatic–Pacific Campaign Medal. On demobilization, he attended the Methodist-affiliated Emory University in Atlanta, from which he graduated in 1949. During the Korean War, Thompson re-enlisted in the United States Air Force as a pilot.

== Professional career ==
On returning from South Korea, Thompson graduated in 1957 from the now-closed Woodrow Wilson College of Law in Atlanta. The following year he was admitted to the Georgia bar and established a law firm in East Point. He was also president of an aviation insurance firm.

== Politics ==
=== Georgia State Senate ===
In the November 3, 1964 general election, in which Barry M. Goldwater of Arizona became the first Republican presidential nominee to win Georgia's electoral votes, Thompson defeated then senior Democratic State Senator Charlie Brown in District 34. Thompson was one of only four Republican members of the upper chamber of the legislature at the time. He was selected by the Democratic majority to represent Fulton County in the drafting and sponsorship of the Metropolitan Rapid Transit Authority Act.

=== U.S. House of Representatives ===
Two years later, Thompson ran for Congress, becoming the first Republican since the Reconstruction era to represent Atlanta and the 5th Congressional District in the United States House. The Democratic Executive Committee chose Archie Lindsey, then the chairman of the Fulton County Commission. Lindsey had three weeks to mount a campaign. Thompson prevailed, 55,423 (60.1 percent) to Lindsey's 36,751 (39.9 percent). Thompson netted some 30% of the Black vote. Thompson voted for the initial House Resolution of the Civil Rights Act of 1968 but voted against the final Senate amendments to the Act. Thompson was re-elected in 1968 and 1970, when he defeated Andrew Young, who after the next election in 1972 in a revised district succeeded Thompson in the Fifth District. In 1968, Thompson was the only Southern congressman to attend Martin Luther King's funeral, and he faced backlash from his constituents as a result.

=== U.S. Senate campaign ===
In 1972, Thompson ran for the U.S. Senate. Sam Nunn defeated David H. Gambrell in the Democratic primary; Gambrell had been appointed by then Governor Jimmy Carter to succeed the late Richard B. Russell Jr. Thompson lost to Nunn, 362,501 votes (46.5 percent) to 404,890 (52 percent).

== Post-political career and death ==
After leaving the U.S. House, Thompson returned to his law firm in Atlanta. In 1985, he was made a member of the Atlanta Regional Commission. From 2009 until 2011, Thompson served as the Commander of the Atlanta World War II Roundtable, an organization that was created in 1986 "to hear and record the war experiences of World War II and to pass on to posterity the knowledge of World War II and the price – human and material – that was paid by our nation for the preservation of freedom in the United States and the world".

Thompson died on September 13, 2022, aged 97. His wife, Kathryn Cochran, whom he married in 1946, predeceased him by seven months. They had two children: Charles and Deborah.

== Electoral history ==
Georgia's 5th congressional district:

Year	Republican	Votes	%	Democratic	Votes	%
1966	√ Fletcher Thompson	55,249	60.1%	Archie L. Lindsey	36,751	39.9%
1968	√ Fletcher Thompson	79,258	55.6%	Charles L. Weltner	63,183	44.4%
1970	√ Fletcher Thompson	78,540	57.4%	Andrew Young	58,394	42.6%

1972 United States Senate special election in Georgia
Party	Candidate	Votes	%
Democratic	Sam Nunn	404,890	51.98%
Republican	Fletcher Thompson	362,501	46.54%
Independent	Alice Conner	7,587	0.97%
Independent	George E. Schmidt	3,932	0.51%
Total votes		778,910	100.00%
Democratic hold			

1972 United States Senate election in Georgia
Party	Candidate	Votes	%
Democratic	Sam Nunn	636,060	53.96%
Republican	Fletcher Thompson	542,291	46.01%
Write-in		391	0.03%
Total votes		1,178,742	100.00%
Democratic hold			

== See also ==
- List of members of the House Un-American Activities Committee

Party political offices
Vacant Title last held by G. H. Williams	Republican nominee for U.S. Senator from Georgia (Class 2); 1972	Succeeded by John Stokes
U.S. House of Representatives
Preceded by Charles Weltner	Member of the U.S. House of Representatives from Georgia's 5th congressional district January 3, 1967 – January 3, 1973	Succeeded by Andrew Young
