= 1990 United States Senate election in Georgia =

- November 6, 1990
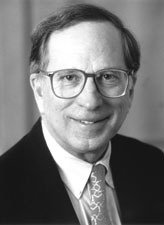
Nominee	Sam Nunn
Party	Democratic
Popular vote	1,033,439
Percentage	100.00%
- County results Nunn: 100%
U.S. Senator before election
Sam Nunn
Democratic
Elected U.S. Senator
Sam Nunn
Democratic

The 1990 United States Senate election in Georgia was held on November 6, 1990. Incumbent Democratic U.S. Senator Sam Nunn won re-election to a fourth term uncontested. This is the last time a Democrat was re-elected to the Senate from the state until 2022 and the last time a Democrat was reelected to the Senate in this seat until 2026. This was also the last United States Senate election in Georgia where a candidate ran unopposed.

== Candidates ==
=== Democratic ===
- Sam Nunn, incumbent U.S. Senator

== Results ==
General election results, 1990
Party	Candidate	Votes	%	±%
Democratic	Sam Nunn (incumbent)	1,033,439	100.00%	+20.06%
Majority		1,033,439	100.00%	+40.12%
Turnout		1,033,439		
Democratic hold				

== See also ==
- 1990 United States Senate elections
