= 1984 United States Senate election in Georgia =

- November 6, 1984
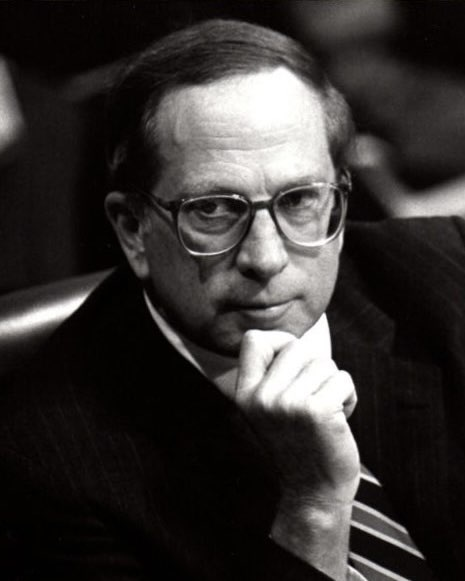

Nominee	Sam Nunn	Mike Hicks
Party	Democratic	Republican
Popular vote	1,344,104	337,196
Percentage	79.94%	20.06%
- Nunn: 60–70% 70–80% 80–90% >90%
U.S. senator before election
Sam Nunn
Democratic
Elected U.S. Senator
Sam Nunn
Democratic

The 1984 United States Senate election in Georgia was held on November 6, 1984. Incumbent Democratic U.S. Senator Sam Nunn won re-election to a third term. This is the last time a Democrat was re-elected to the Senate from the state without a runoff until 2026.

== Major candidates ==
=== Democratic ===
- Sam Nunn, incumbent Senator

=== Republican ===
- Mike Hicks, educator

== Results ==
General election results
Party	Candidate	Votes	%	±%
Democratic	Sam Nunn (incumbent)	1,344,104	79.94%	−3.19%
Republican	Mike Hicks	337,196	20.06%	+3.19%
Majority		1,006,908	59.88%	−6.39%
Turnout		1,681,300		
Democratic hold		Swing		

== See also ==
- 1984 United States Senate elections
