= Georgia Southern University =

Public university in Statesboro, Georgia, US

Coordinates: 32°25′10″N 81°46′36″W

- Former name: List: First District Agricultural & Mechanical School (1908–1924) Georgia Normal School (1924–1929) South Georgia Teachers College (1929–1939) Georgia Teachers College (1939–1959) Georgia Southern College (1959–1990)
- Type: Public research university
- Established: December 1, 1906; 119 years ago
- Parent institution: University System of Georgia
- Accreditation: SACS
- Academic affiliations: Space-grant
- Endowment: $117.4 million (2025)
- President: Kyle Marrero
- Provost: Avinandan Mukherjee
- Faculty: 1,103 (fall 2023)
- Students: 34,541 (fall 2026)
- Location: Statesboro, Georgia, United States
- Campus: 900 acres (3.6 km^{2}); Distant town
- Other campuses: Savannah; Swainsboro; Hinesville; Wexford (Ireland)
- Newspaper: The George-Anne
- Colors: Blue and white
- Nickname: Eagles
- Sporting affiliations: NCAA Division I FBS – Sun Belt; CCSA; SoCon
- Mascots: Gus the Eagle; Freedom (live bald eagle)
- Website: georgiasouthern.edu

Georgia Southern University (informally known as Southern or Georgia Southern) is a public research university in the U.S. state of Georgia. The flagship campus is in Statesboro, with additional campuses in Savannah (Armstrong Campus), Swainsboro (East Georgia Campus), and Hinesville (Liberty Campus). Founded in 1906, Georgia Southern is the fifth-largest institution in the University System of Georgia.

The university offers over 150 different academic majors at the bachelor's, master's, and doctoral levels. The university had an enrollment of approximately 30,000 students in 2026. Georgia Southern is classified among "R2: Doctoral Universities – High research activity" and a "comprehensive" university by the University System of Georgia.

Georgia Southern University's intercollegiate sports teams, known as the "Eagles", compete in the Sun Belt Conference.

== History ==
Presidents:
J. Walter Hendricks	1908–1909*
E.C.J. Dickens	1909–1914*
F.M. Rowan	1915–1920*
Ernest V. Hollis	1920–1926*
Guy H. Wells	1926–1934
Marvin S. Pittman	1934–1941
Albert M. Gates	1941–1943
Marvin S. Pittman	1943–1947
Judson (Jake) C. Ward Jr.	1947–1948
Zach S. Henderson	1948–1968
John O. Edison	1968–1971
Pope A. Duncan	1971–1976
Nicholas W. Quick (acting)	1977–1978
Dale W. Lick	1978–1986
Harrison (Harry) S. Carter (acting)	1986–1987
Nicholas L. Henry	1987–1998
Bruce F. Grube	1999–2009
Brooks A. Keel	2010–2015
Jean E. Bartels (acting)	2015–2016
Jaimie L. Hebert	2016–2018
Shelley C. Nickel (acting)	2018–2019
Kyle Marrero	2019–
*as "Principal"

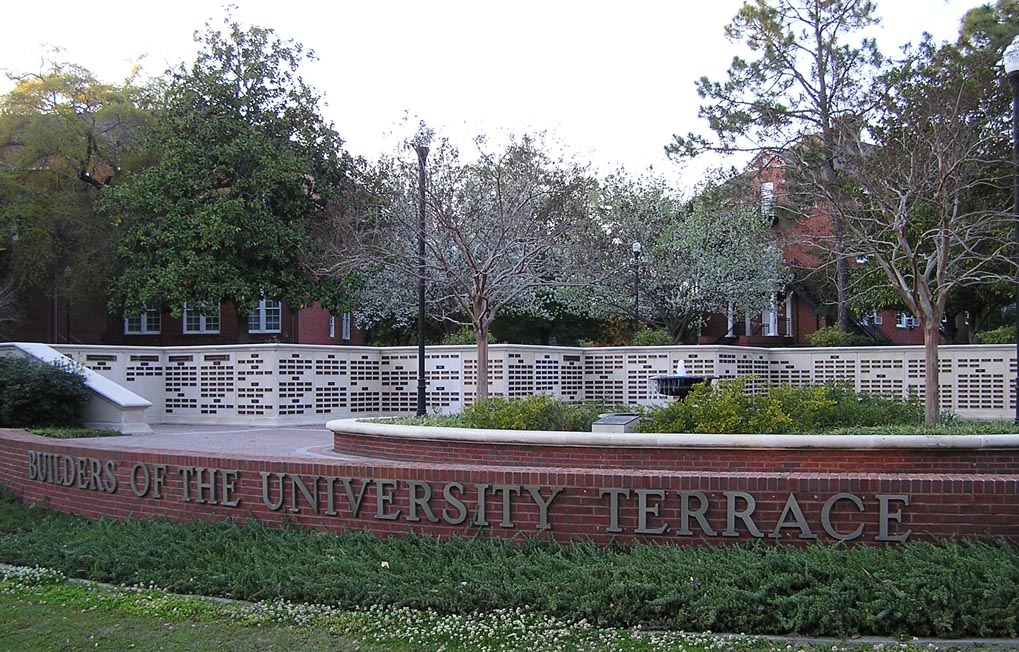
The Builders of the University Terrace

Georgia Southern University began as First District Agricultural & Mechanical School, a land grant college under federal legislation and support. It opened in 1908 with four faculty members and 15 students.

Founded as a school for teaching modern agricultural production techniques and homemaking skills to rural school children, First District A&M within two decades shifted its emphasis to meet the growing need for teachers within the state. Its name and mission were changed in 1924 to Georgia Normal School, as a training ground for teachers. Five years later in 1929, after development of a four-year curriculum, it was granted full-fledged senior college status by the state, and the school was renamed as South Georgia Teachers College.

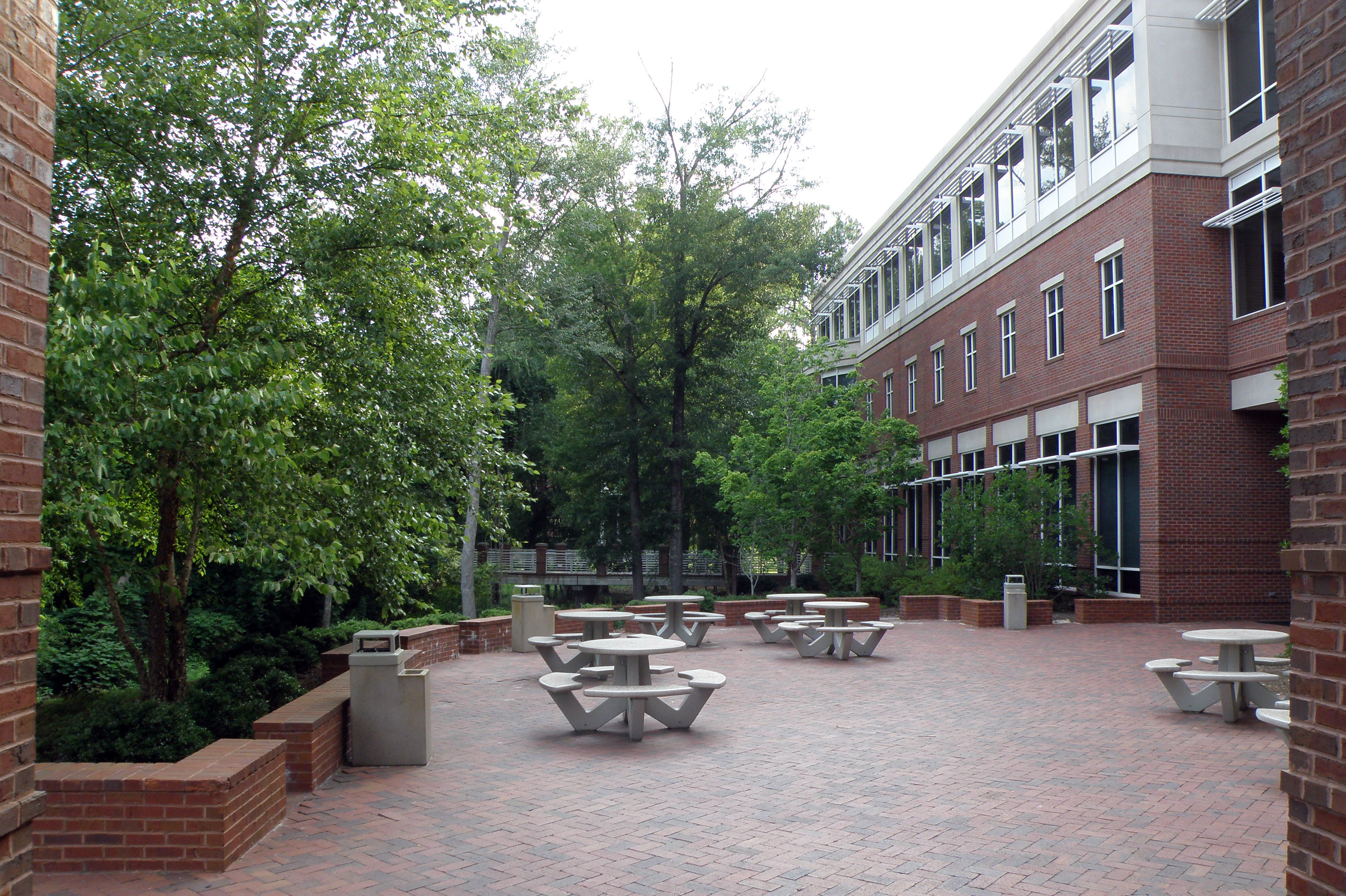
Coca-Cola Plaza behind the College of Business Administration at Georgia Southern

Ensuing decades found more name and mission changes: to Georgia Teachers College in 1939 and Georgia Southern College in 1959.

The university finally integrated its student body in 1965, eleven years after the United States Supreme Court's ruling in Brown v. Board of Education (1954). College President Marvin Pittman had been fired in 1941 by Georgia governor Eugene Talmadge for supporting racial integration; he was eventually rehired.

Georgia Southern has continued its program and physical expansion. With the development of graduate programs in numerous fields and associated research, the institution was granted university status in 1990 as Georgia Southern University.

Since then, the university has embarked on a massive upgrade of facilities, adding more than $300 million in new construction. Georgia Southern was named a Doctoral/Research University by Carnegie Foundation for the Advancement of Teaching in 2006. The university is recognized in publications including U.S. News & World Report's "America's Best Colleges" and "Best Graduate Schools", Forbes' "America's Best Colleges" and, most recently, by Kiplinger for being one of the "Top 100 Best Values among Public Colleges and Universities." Additionally, Georgia Southern's MBA program was named one of the "Best 301" in the country by The Princeton Review.

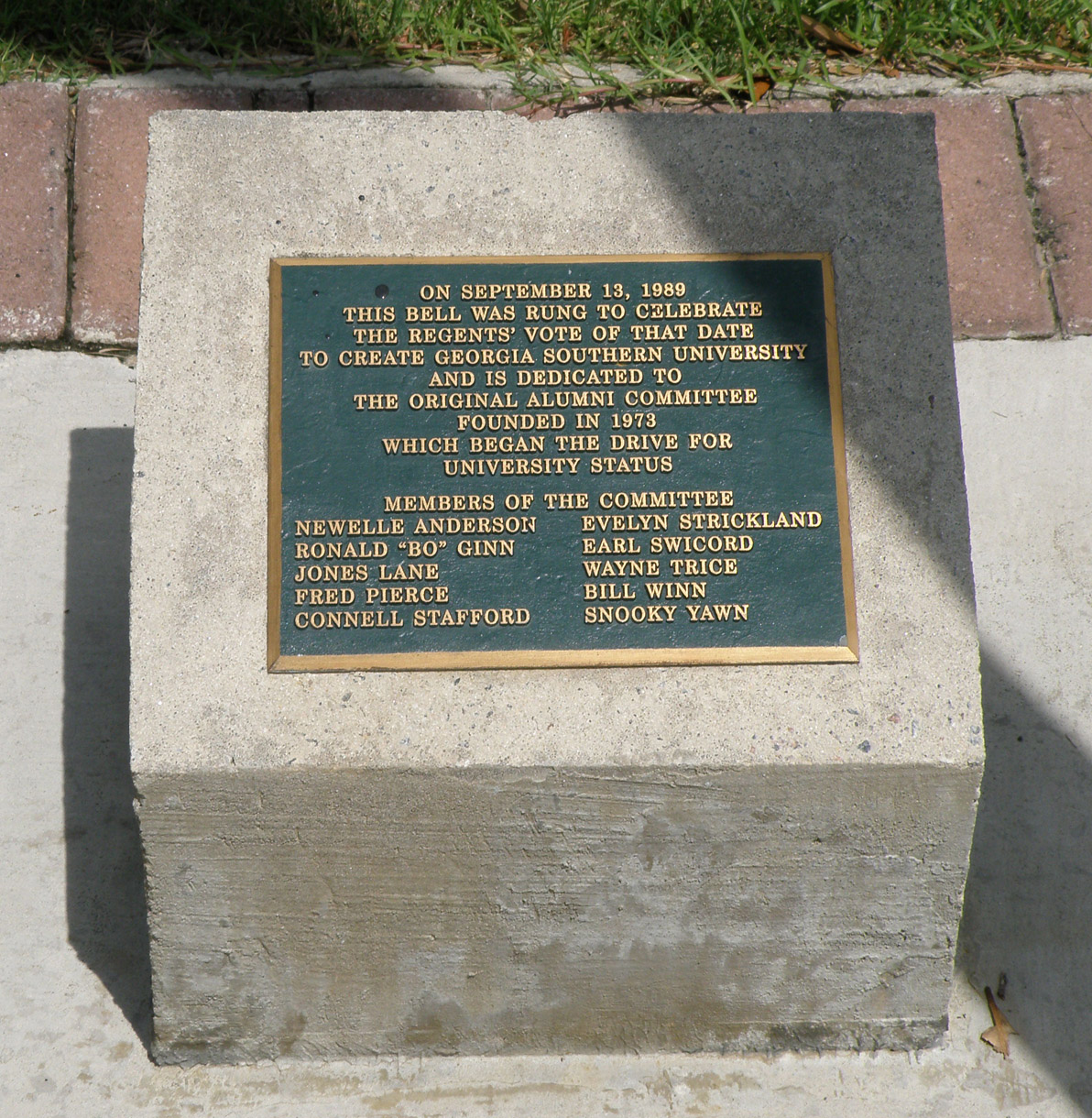
The founding marker at Georgia Southern University

Since 1999, two new colleges have been established: the College of Information Technology in 2001, and the Jiann-Ping Hsu College of Public Health in 2004. Additional undergraduate and graduate programs were formed, including doctorate degrees in psychology, public health and nursing. In 2011, the university established the Allen E. Paulson College of Engineering and Computing, formerly known as College of Engineering and Information Technology, which combines the previous College of IT with its engineering programs. In addition, at the same time it created the College of Science and Mathematics, previously known as the Allen E. Paulson College of Science and Technology.

Online bachelor's degrees are available in nursing, general studies, and information technology. Master's programs are offered in kinesiology, instructional technology, accomplished teaching, instructional improvement, higher education administration, reading education, middle grades education, secondary education, special education, and educational leadership. Additionally, the university offers master's degrees in business administration, applied economics, accounting, computer science and sport management. Georgia Southern also offers online endorsements in online teaching and learning, K-5 math, and reading.

Since 1999, the university has had its most significant growth in its more than 100-year history. It has grown in enrollment and physical facilities. Under a Campus Master Plan, the university added the new 1,001-bed residence hall Centennial Place. It has completely renovated and significantly expanded the Zach S. Henderson Library. Completed in 2009, the Eugene M. Bishop Alumni Center is a gathering place for alumni and friends of the university. The Center for Wildlife Education and the Botanical Garden have also been expanded. Currently, the university is concluding construction on a new Engineering and Research Building. The building's primary focus is aimed at manufacturing engineering.

In October 2019, some students of Georgia Southern University publicly burned books of Cuban-American novelist Jennine Capó Crucet after she gave a talk on campus. The university declared that "book burning does not align with Georgia Southern's values" but declined to discipline the students. Campus events were scheduled October 15 and 16 to discuss censorship and free speech in response to the book burning.

Journalist Abby Martin was scheduled to be the keynote speaker at Georgia Southern University's eighth annual International Critical Media Literacy Conference at Georgia Coastal Center in Savannah on February 28, 2020. When she received the contract for this engagement from GSU, she noted a paragraph included pursuant to Georgia's law prohibiting participation in boycotts of Israel on the part of parties doing business with the State of Georgia passed in 2016. The university cancelled the engagement after Martin refused to agree with the stipulation. Thereupon, Martin filed suit against GSU and a number of its officials in the Federal District Court for Northern Georgia seeking the voiding of the Georgia statute on grounds of unconstitutional violation of her rights. The event was cancelled.

=== Consolidations with Armstrong State University and East Georgia State College ===
On January 11, 2017, the Regents of the University System of Georgia announced that the university would merge with Armstrong State University in Savannah as part of the ongoing campus consolidations recommended by the University System of Georgia (USG). Since 2011, in an attempt to improve efficiency and lower costs, the USG has consolidated several colleges and universities within its system, merging some and closing others while altering or transforming curriculums. In January 2018, both Armstrong State and its smaller Liberty Campus, located in Hinesville, formally merged with Georgia Southern.

On April 8, 2025, University System Chancellor Sonny Perdue made a recommendation to the Board of Regents to consolidate Georgia Southern with East Georgia State College (EGSC) in Swainsboro, effective January 1, 2026. On April 15, 2025, the Regents held their monthly board meeting on the main campus of Georgia Southern, formally approving the consolidation of Georgia Southern and EGSC. The following day, the Regents and Georgia Southern leaders held a town hall on the EGSC campus in Swainsboro to address concerns among EGSC students, faculty, staff, alumni, and the Swainsboro community at-large regarding the forthcoming consolidation. In early June 2025, the Board of Regents, Georgia Southern leadership, and EGSC leadership revealed that the name for the Swainsboro campus would called Georgia Southern University–East Georgia Campus; additionally, Georgia Southern president Kyle Marrero concurrently served as the interim president of EGSC during the consolidation process effective July 1, 2025, after then-incumbent EGSC president David Schecter retired.

== Campuses ==
=== Statesboro Campus ===
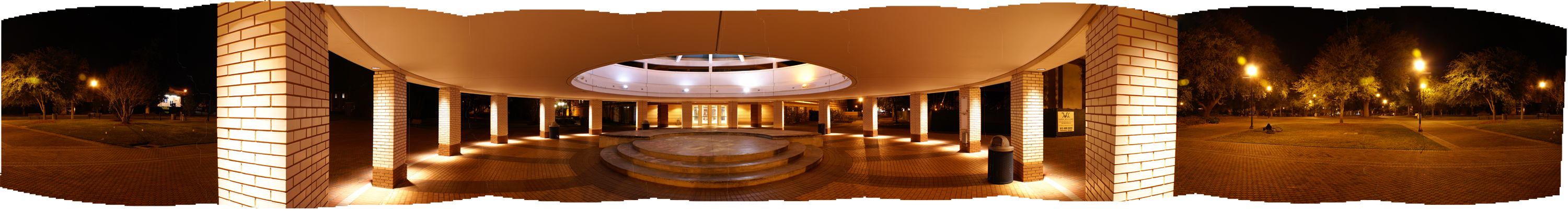
A panorama of Georgia Southern's rotunda

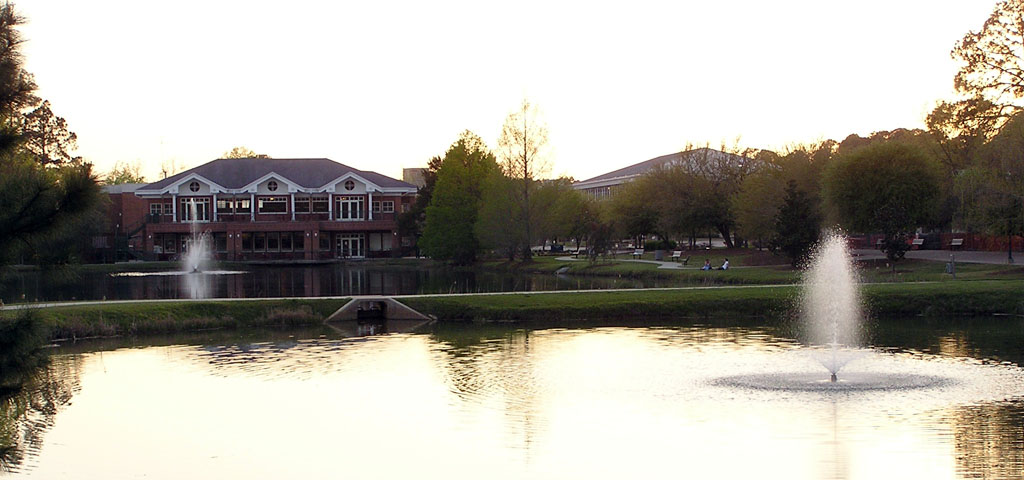
Sunset at Lake Wells and Ruby (left hand side) and the College of Information Technology (rooftop visible behind the trees)

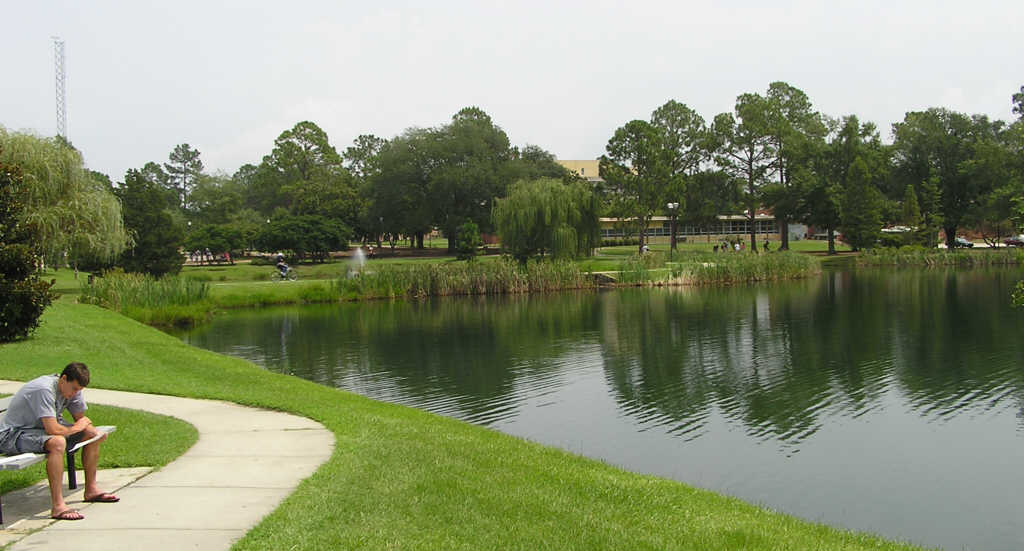
Lake Wells and Ruby

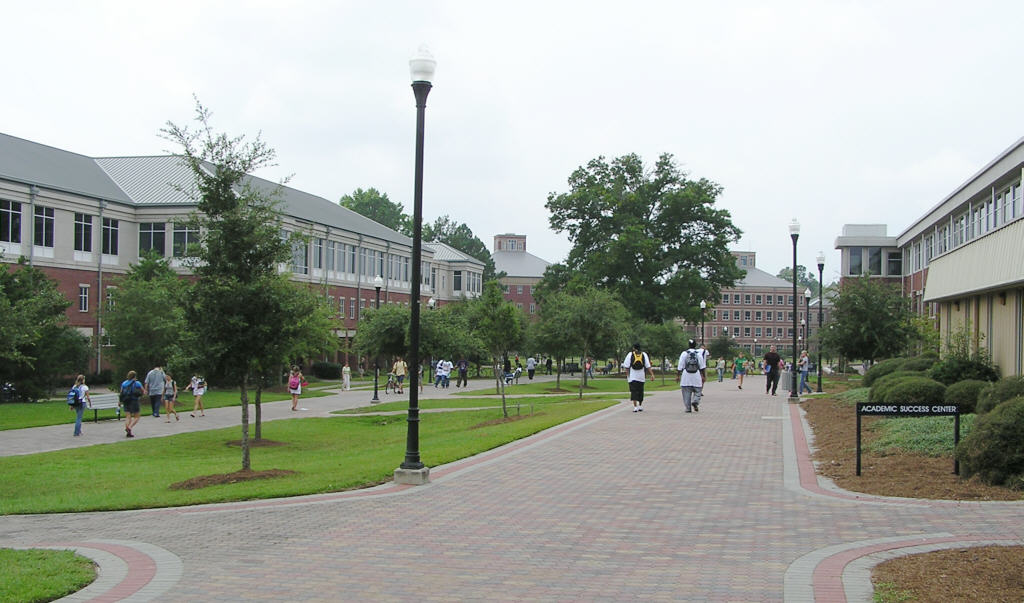
Pedestrium looking towards College of Business Administration and the College of Education

Georgia Southern's flagship campus is located in the city of Statesboro, Georgia and is accessible by Interstate 16 from the cities of Macon and Savannah. By car, Statesboro is approximately one hour from Savannah, two hours from Macon, and three hours from Atlanta.

==== Center for Wildlife Education and Lamar Q Ball Jr. Raptor Center ====
The Center for Wildlife Education and the Lamar Q Ball Jr. Raptor Center is an educational and research facility located on 18 acres (73,000 m^{2}). In addition to undergraduate and graduate research, the center hosts over 165,500 annual visitors through general admission and off-site outreach programs. The center is home to "Freedom", Georgia Southern's American bald eagle mascot, as well as 85 other birds, 67 reptiles, 70 amphibians, and eight mammals. Species of birds of prey include hawks, owls, falcons, kestrels, vultures. The center also contains an amphitheater and an indoor classroom. Inside the center, exhibitions of reptiles and amphibians such as alligators, painted turtles, box turtles, and gopher tortoises, rattlesnakes, corn snakes, king snakes, boa constrictors, pythons, are held. The staff perform demonstrations of raptors in flight. In 2009, the center added a 12-acre (49,000 m^{2}) expansion known as the Wetland Preserve, featuring various species of water fowl in their native habitats. The center is the only one of its kind to be located within the campus of a major university.

==== Recreation Activity Center (RAC) ====
The Recreation Activity Center (the RAC) is a 220,000-square-foot (20,000 m^{2}) complex that includes areas for weight lifting, cardio, and basketball. It includes an indoor track, two dance studios, a studio for yoga and pilates, five racquetball courts, and a 45-foot (14 m) indoor climbing wall.

In 2006, the RAC was expanded, adding additional basketball and multi-purpose courts, weight and fitness rooms, an Olympic-size swimming pool, a rehabilitation pool, and more space for CRI (Campus Recreation and Intramural) personnel. The expansion also brought a bandshell area that has hosted several national touring artists.

==== Botanical Garden ====
The Georgia Southern Botanical Garden is centered on an early 20th-century farmstead and offers visitors a view of the cultural and natural heritage of the southeastern coastal plain, an area rich in endangered plants. The garden's nearly 11-acre (45,000 m^{2}) site includes woodland trails, the Bland Cottage Visitor Center and Gift Shop, Heritage Garden, Rose Arbor, Children's Vegetable Garden, Camellia Garden, Native Plant Landscape Garden, Native Azalea Collection and Bog Garden.

==== Student housing ====
Georgia Southern currently has seven housing facilities, Centennial Place, Kennedy Hall, Watson Hall, Eagle Village, Freedom's Landing, Southern Courtyard, and Southern Pines offering mostly suite and apartment configurations. In the fall of 2008, Centennial Place, a residential complex with four buildings, was constructed. It contains 1,001 beds and retail space. Eagle Village is a housing facility reserved for freshmen only and houses roughly 775 freshman residents each year. First-year Georgia Southern students, with some exceptions, are required to live on campus.

Georgia Southern University purchased Campus Club during May 2012 and began offering campus housing under the name of Freedom's Landing for the fall 2012 semester. Located near the stadium, Freedom's Landing contains 978 beds and is dedicated housing for upperclassmen.

==== Eagle Dining Services ====
Eagle Dining Services (part of Auxiliary Services at Georgia Southern University) manages all dining locations on campus. Eagle Dining completed two new dining commons (named Landrum and Lakeside, after the former facilities) that opened in the fall of 2013.

Retail dining locations by Eagle Dining Services include an on-campus Starbucks and Chick-fil-A, that are managed by EDS staff. They also have their own concepts of Zach's Brews (located in the Zach Henderson Library), Market Street Deli (located in the IT Building), Sushi with Gusto (located in the Nursing/Chemistry Building), and Oasis Smoothie & Juice Bar (located in the Recreation and Activities Center). Eagle Dining Services also manages concessions for many Georgia Southern Athletics events, vending all across campus, Catering Services and two convenience stores known as Gus Marts (located in the Russell Union and IT Building).

Georgia Southern University is one of the first to implement a biometric iris recognition system to gain entry to the dining halls in lieu of a swipe card. This system was added to the RAC in the fall of 2015.

==== Georgia Southern Museum ====
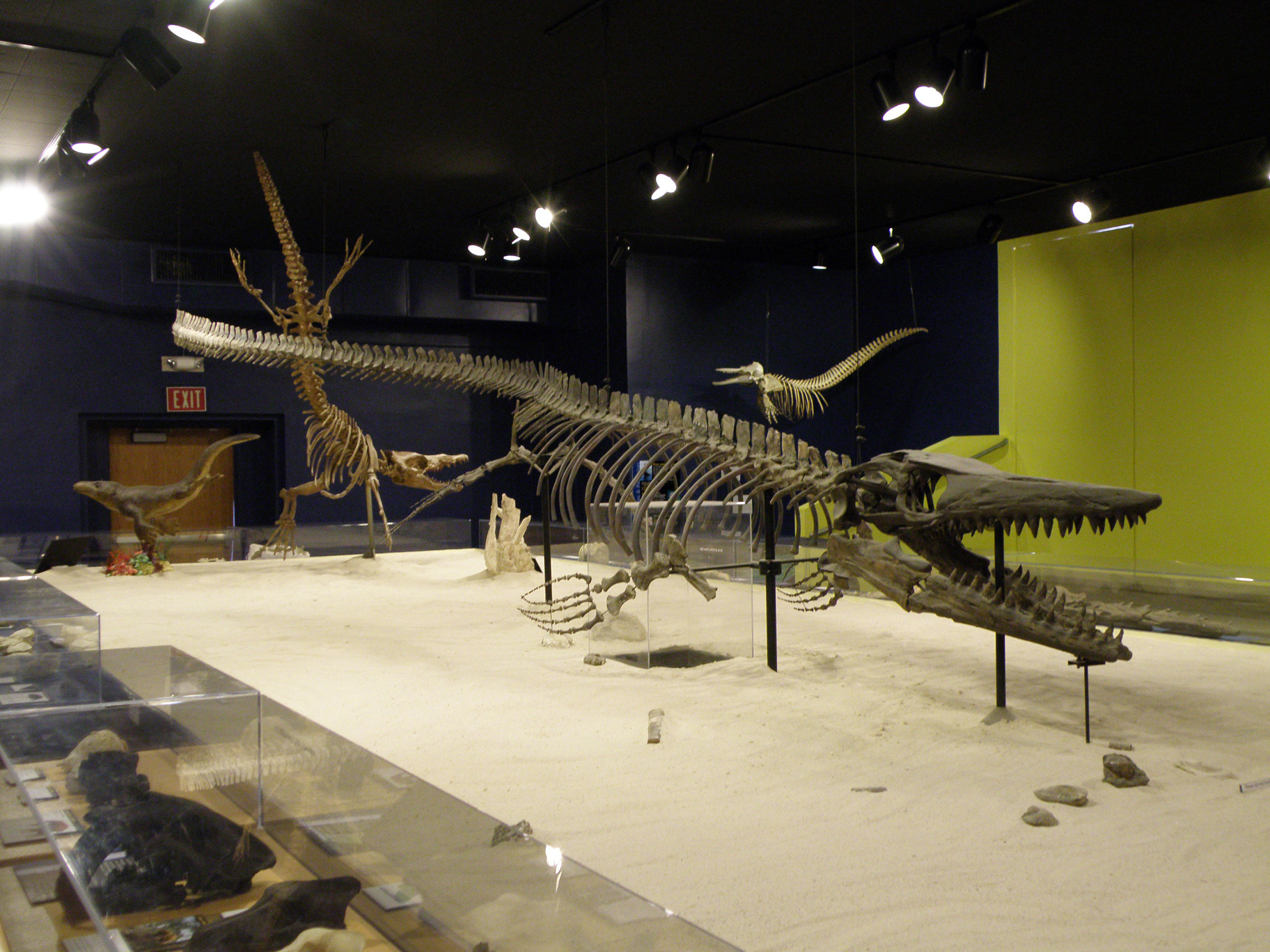
A permanent exhibit concerning ancient sea life at the Georgia Southern Museum

For more than two decades, the University Museum has showcased artifacts of the natural and cultural history of the region, as well as offered visiting exhibits from U.S. and international museums. It holds both permanent and traveling educational programs which include interactive and hands-on programs. Permanent collections and exhibits focus on preserving the natural and cultural history of the Coastal Plain.

==== Center for Art & Theatre ====
The Center for Art & Theatre opened on February 29, 2008. One of its three galleries is the permanent home of the Georgia Artists Collection, a continuously expanding gift of pieces established and curated by Betty Foy Sanders, Bulloch County native and wife of former Georgia Governor Carl Sanders. Other galleries feature scheduled exhibitions of private, student, and faculty works. The center also hosts a 150-seat Black Box Theatre for student performances.

==== Performing Arts Center ====
The Performing Arts Center is home to touring shows, lecturers, and programs for cultural outreach. The 825-seat theatre features an orchestra pit and shell, a full-sized stage, and technology for lighting, sound, and production.

==== Southern Express ====
Southern Express is Georgia Southern's bus transportation system. In the fall of 2010, adjustments were made and two new routes with a total of eight buses were introduced. The Gold Route runs from the University Store and makes two stops on Forest Drive before proceeding to the RAC and the park-ride lot at Paulson Stadium. The Gold Route Buses then return to the store making the same stops as before. The Blue Route makes one large circle. The Blue route starts at the University Store and makes two stops on Forest Drive and two stops on Lanier Drive before returning to the University Store. The buses change their routes on days of football games to accommodate fans. During the 2009–2010 school year the buses carried almost 1.6 million passengers.

=== Armstrong Campus ===
Georgia Southern's Armstrong Campus is located in Savannah, accessible by Interstate 16 and Interstate 95. Prior to consolidation with Georgia Southern, the Armstrong Campus was founded as Armstrong Junior College in 1935 by Mayor Thomas Gamble to help Savannah's youth and the community at large in stimulating the local economy during the height of the Great Depression. Originally housed in the historic Armstrong House downtown, Armstrong moved to its current location in January 1966.

The Armstrong campus is located in a suburban setting near the Savannah Mall, with direct access to downtown Savannah via Abercorn Expressway. The landscaped campus includes subtropical ferns and flowers, southern magnolias, oak trees draped with Spanish moss, and a wide variety of native plants scattered throughout the 268-acre (1.08 km^{2}) arboretum-style grounds.

The campus is home to the Georgia Southern's Colleges of Education, Health Professions, and Public Health.

Lane Library is the main academic and research library on the Armstrong campus. Its collection comprises more than 200,000 books and printed materials as well as 18,000 audiovisual works. The university recently invested $5 million in a renovation and expansion of the facility.

The Science Center complex is a two-building complex connected by an enclosed glass walkway. It is home to the Biology, Chemistry, Computer Science, Physics, and Psychology departments. It includes classroom and lecture space, faculty offices, and labs. The 126,056-square-foot (11,711.0 m^{2}) facility opened in 2001 as the largest single increase in instructional space on campus since the campus opened.

A 61,000-square-foot (5,700 m^{2}), $24 million student union opened in 2010. It was the Armstrong State University's first green building, built with rapidly renewable and recycled materials and featuring a high-efficiency chilled water cooling system. The union houses a 300-seat food court, 200-seat movie theatre, ballroom, bookstore, coffeehouse, convenience store, and expansive porches and lounges. Next to the Student Union is the Memorial College Center. Commonly known as the MCC, it houses the Student Affairs and Student Activities offices for the campus.

Armstrong's athletic facilities are located in the southeast area of campus. The Student Recreation and Aquatic Center is a 38,000-square-foot (3,500 m^{2}) athletic facility that includes a 5,200-square-foot (480 m^{2}) fitness center, and two basketball courts. The Alumni Arena is located adjacent to the Rec Center and includes an indoor running track, weight room, coaches offices, classroom space, and a 4,000-seat arena home to the men's and women's basketball teams.

Since consolidation with Georgia Southern, the Armstrong Campus has not maintained a separate athletics program, with the future of these athletic facilities uncertain. Near the end of the 2017–2018 academic year, there were talks of renovating the campus' current athletic facilities to allow for the university's tennis and soccer teams to practice and play at the Armstrong Campus, in addition to creating new recreational and general purpose fields. Such a proposal, if approved, could take up to a decade to complete, with the entire project having a low-end cost of forty million dollars to upgrade the campus's current athletic facilities, including infrastructure needs as mandated by division standards.

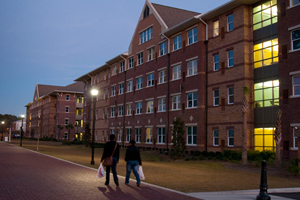
Windward Commons suite-style residential community opened in 2010.

More than 1,400 students live on campus in the four residential communities located in the southwest portion of the campus. Windward Commons, which opened in 2010, is Armstrong's suite-style freshmen residential community and is home to nearly 600 students. It features private and semi-private suites, music practice rooms, multipurpose classrooms, lounge/social areas, laundry facilities, courtyards with outdoor sitting space and barbecue areas, and two classrooms. Compass Point, University Terrace, and University Crossings are apartment-style residence halls for upperclassmen and graduate students.

On April 24, 2013, Armstrong completed renovations to the Memorial College Center, opening the Learning Commons. The 14,000-square-foot (1,300 m^{2}) space was developed as an extension to the campus's Lane Library. Features include Mac and PC labs, three multi-touch tables, and group study rooms.

=== East Georgia Campus ===
The East Georgia Campus is located in Swainsboro, approximately 37 miles (60 km) west of Statesboro, 72 miles (116 km) south of Augusta, and approximately halfway between Macon and Savannah. Prior to consolidation, the East Georgia Campus was established in 1973 as Emanuel County Junior College, renamed as East Georgia College in 1988, and East Georgia State College in 2012.

Prior to consolidation, EGSC and Georgia Southern began a collaboration in 1997 to serve Statesboro-area students as well as those who did not meet Georgia Southern's first-year admissions requirements, with participating students enrolled as EGSC students, attending classes on the Georgia Southern campus and able to access most services available to Georgia Southern students; EGSC students were not allowed to participate in Georgia Southern's NCAA intercollegiate athletics or the Greek system. EGSC would later begin a similar collaboration with Augusta University in 2013; however, the Augusta Center was phased out with the consolidation following the 2026 spring semester.

The East Georgia Campus maintains its own tuition rate and admissions criteria, keeping in line with the former EGSC's mission of open access. First-year admission at the East Georgia Campus requires a high school diploma or GED as well as a required high school curriculum minimum GPA of 2.0; standardized test scores are not required.

Unlike the Armstrong Campus, the East Georgia Campus maintains a separate athletics program as the Georgia Southern Golden Eagles, competing in the National Association of Intercollegiate Athletics (NAIA). The Golden Eagles' sports offerings include men's and women's basketball, baseball, softball, and men's and women's cross country. The Golden Eagles are competing as an independent in its first year of NAIA competition with intentions to join the Southern States Athletic Conference (SSAC) in the 2027–28 academic year.

=== Liberty Campus ===
The Liberty Campus in Hinesville first began operations as a satellite campus of Armstrong State University in 1997, moving to its current facilities in January 2016. It offers select programs to residents of Liberty County and surrounding areas. The Liberty Campus provides special services to Fort Stewart military personnel and their families. A variety of programs are offered or supported, including associate’s degrees in arts and applied sciences, and bachelor's degrees in criminal justice, nursing, early childhood education, middle grades education, and liberal studies, with plans to develop consortium programs with Savannah State University in the years post-consolidation.

== Academics ==
Academic rankings

National
- Forbes: 562
- U.S. News & World Report: 342 (tie)
- Washington Monthly: 190

Global
- U.S. News & World Report: 1551 (tie)

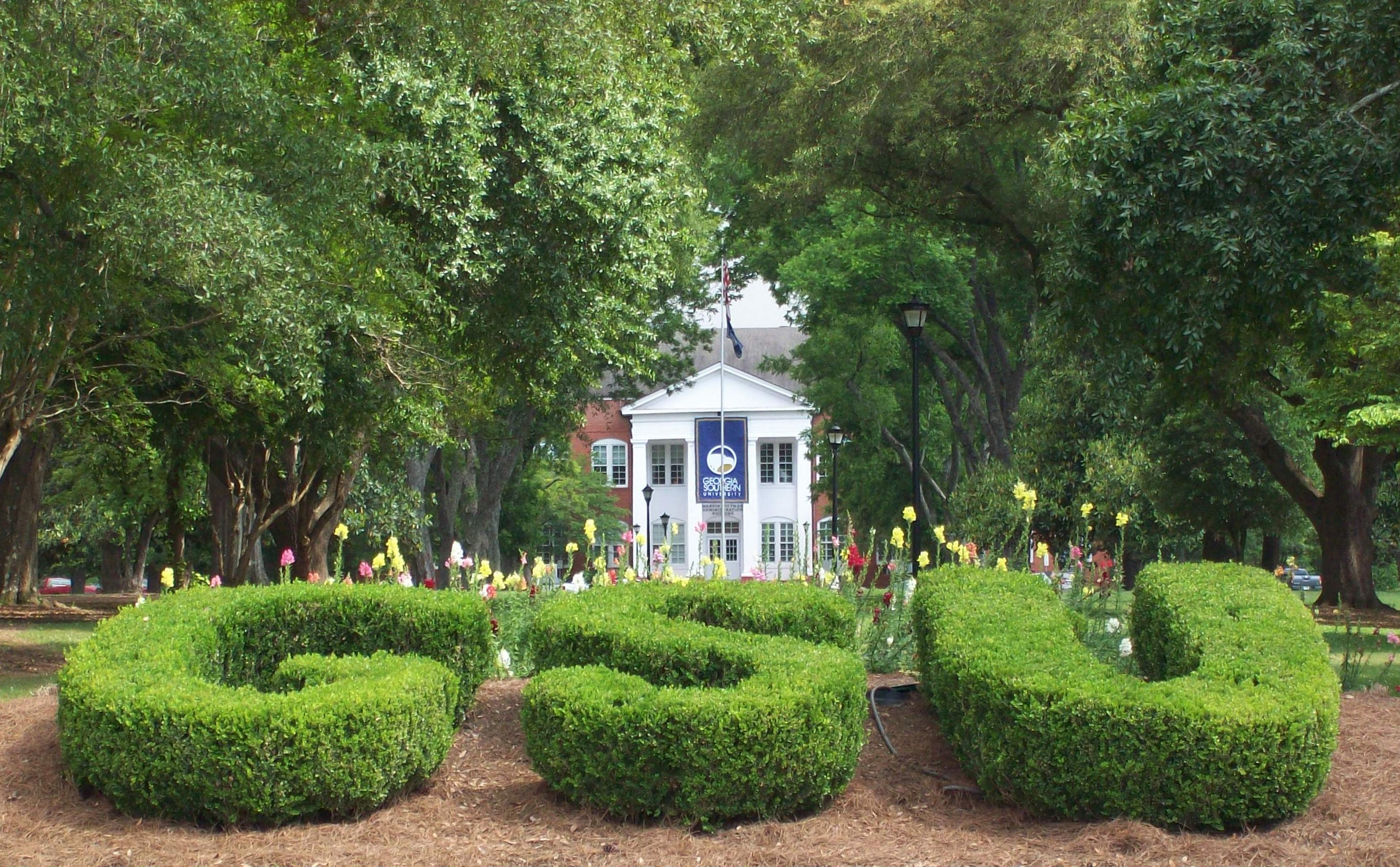
GSU shrub lettering as viewed from Sweetheart Circle

Georgia Southern is classified as a comprehensive university by the University System of Georgia. Georgia Southern University is accredited by Southern Association of Colleges and Schools and is overseen by the Georgia Board of Regents.

=== Colleges ===
- Allen E. Paulson College of Engineering & Computing
- College of Arts & Humanities
- College of Behavioral & Social Sciences
- College of Education
- College of Science & Mathematics
- Honors College
- Jack N. Averitt College of Graduate Studies
- Jiann-Ping Hsu College of Public Health
- Parker College of Business
- Waters College of Health Professions
- University College

Georgia Southern University’s Honors College provides a selective academic program open to high-achieving undergraduate students from all fields of study. The honors college provides special learning opportunities and privileges to admitted students.

University College was established in 2026, following the consolidation of East Georgia State College and Georgia Southern. University College serves as the academic home for students in associate degree programs, interdisciplinary bachelor's degree programs, dual enrollment, ROTC, and Continuing and Professional Education.

=== Degree programs ===
The university offers more than 150 associate degree, bachelor's degree, master's degree, and doctorate programs in twelve colleges.

In 2010, Georgia Southern received approval to offer three new engineering degrees: Bachelor of Science in Civil Engineering, Bachelor of Science in Electrical Engineering, and the Bachelor of Science in Mechanical Engineering. Classes for the engineering school began in the fall of 2011.

The Parker College of Business houses the only School of Economic Development in the southeastern United States. The School of Accountancy in the Parker College of Business is the only AACSB certified school in the United States to offer forensic accounting courses to both undergraduate and graduate students.

Georgia Southern's Department of Writing and Linguistics is the only freestanding writing department in the State of Georgia.

The Ph.D. in Logistics/Supply Chain Management is the first of its kind to be offered in the state of Georgia through the university's Parker College of Business. Classes began in the fall of 2010.

=== Undergraduate admissions ===
In 2025, Georgia Southern accepted 89.6% of undergraduate applicants with those enrolled having an average 3.36 high school GPA. The university does not require submission of standardized test scores, but they will be considered as part of an application if submitted. Those enrolled who submitted test scores had an average 1170 SAT score (49% submitting scores) or an average 20 ACT score (24% submitting scores).

=== Enrollment statistics ===
In the fall of 2014 the university enrolled 18,004 students in undergraduate programs and 2,513 students in graduate programs. The student population was 52% female and 48% male. With the consolidation with Armstrong State University, the university's overall student population was 27,459 for the 2017–2018 school year.

== Research ==
=== Facilities and classification ===
Georgia Southern is involved in energy-related issues in a move toward energy independence and self-sufficiency, with a focus on renewable energy and environmental science research. The State of Georgia established and funded an Endowed Chair of Renewable Energy at Georgia Southern, and biofuel facilities in the state are converting Georgia-grown agricultural products into marketable fuel. The research team is identifying renewable sources of energy in south Georgia and design and evaluate products to capture the energy in a usable form for commercial or residential use in the region. The research team is also assisting regional industries in energy consumption analysis, appropriate strategies for conservation of energy, and preservation of our environments. In addition to creating a regional repository of technology that showcases renewable energy application, these activities will help advance the State of Georgia and the region through the benefits of higher education.

Georgia Southern is home to the Institute of Arthropodology and Parasitology. In honor of the founder of the institute, the name was changed in 2013 to the James H. Oliver Jr., Institute for Coastal Plain Science. An integral part of this program is the U.S. National Tick Collection, the largest collection of ticks in the world, with more than one million specimens representing most of the world's 850 species.

Georgia Southern is classified as a "R2" research university by the Carnegie Foundation for the Advancement of Teaching.

=== Herty Advanced Material Development Center ===
Georgia Southern University welcomed Georgia Governor Nathan Deal to campus in April 2012 to sign Georgia Senate Bill 396 into law transferring management of the Herty Advanced Materials Development Center to the university. The new legislation, which aligned the university and Herty to create the Georgia Southern University Herty Advanced Materials Development Center, is designed to enhance economic and business development in the state of Georgia. The alignment became effective July 1, 2012. Herty's clients are currently focused in the transportation, forest and paper related products, building materials, energy and the environment and bio-products industries.

The Herty Advanced Material Development Center, which is located near the Port of Savannah, is named for the chemist, businessman and academic Charles Herty (1837–1938), who revolutionized the nation's naval stores industry through innovations in turpentine and paper making in the early 1900s. Herty devised the first system for manufacturing newsprint from southern pines, giving the South a tremendously successful cash crop. His first experiments on southern pines were conducted in a forest located on the university's campus. The university erected a plaque in 1935 noting the site.

== Student life ==
Undergraduate demographics as of Fall 2023
Race and ethnicity	Total
White	58%
Black	25%
Hispanic	8%
Two or more races	5%
Asian	2%
International student	1%
Unknown	1%
Economic diversity
Low-income (Note: The percentage of students who received an income-based federal Pell grant intended for low-income students.)	38%
Affluent (Note: The percentage of students who are a part of the American middle class at the bare minimum.)	62%

There are many types of organizations on campus, including professional, Greek letter, cultural, service and religious. The Armed Forces ROTC would be considered as a professional student organization while the Hispanic Student Association would be considered a cultural student organization. Other professional organizations include AITP.

Political organizations include the Young Democrats and Young Americans for Liberty. The Young Democrats of Georgia Southern has established significant efforts in getting students to vote. These efforts include working with city and county officials to get a voting precinct on campus, and the Voter Action Program, which has a voter hotline and an email system to coordinate with students.

=== Eagle Battalion ROTC ===
Although Georgia Southern is not a military college, it has an Eagle Battalion ROTC. It also produces a large number of military nurses. In 2010 and 2011, it was presented with the prestigious MacArthur Award, recognizing the unit as one of the eight best in the country.

=== Student Media ===
The Department of Student Media houses six divisions: the George-Anne, Business, Marketing, Magazines, and two Production divisions, one digital, one print. Each of these divisions is led by one student Executive Officer who reports to the director and the Student Media Advisory Board. The board is composed of students and staff. The organization has around 70 student members.

- The George-Anne, Student Media's flagship publication for the Statesboro campus, is published on the Statesboro Campus every Tuesday and Thursday during the fall and spring semesters. During the summer terms, it is published biweekly on Thursdays. It also publishes online daily at thegeorgeanne.com. It does not print during the week of finals.
  - The George-Anne, Inkwell Edition publishes weekly on Thursdays for the Armstrong Campus. It publishes its articles online at theinkwellonline.com.
- The Magazines Division produces The Reflector, The Miscellany, Our House, Lantern Walk and Our Neighborhood. The Reflector is the student interest news magazine of Georgia Southern. The Miscellany is a literary arts magazine made up of submissions from the student body and university community. Our House is a publication geared toward helping upperclassmen find housing once they leave the on-campus options. Our Neighborhood contains information about the surrounding community, like restaurants and places to shop in town. The Lantern Walk is a publication distributed at Georgia Southern's graduation ceremony that includes information about graduation as well as the names of every graduate.
- The Business Division earns 40 percent of Student Media's operating budget through advertising sales.
- The Marketing Division organizes all of the publication's events, including release parties, fundraisers and Student Media's award-winning First Amendment Free Food Festival. The division is also in charge of distributing all of Student Media's publications.
- The Digital Division is home to Student Media's videographers and web designers. They maintain thegeorgeanne.com, produce video coverage and monitor multiple social media accounts for Student Media.
- The Creative Division oversees the production of all of Student Media's print publications and assists with thegeorgeanne.com. Designers and photographers produce visual content for Student Media's publications.

=== Student Government Association ===
The Georgia Southern University Student Government Association (SGA) is a devolved system in which the individual campuses are self-governing. The Liberty Campus operates under the jurisdiction of the Armstrong Campus. It is led by a single president who oversees the entire organization and the executive branch. The legislative branch is led by a speaker and executive vice president who presides over meetings of the whole of the legislative branch. The SGA president chairs the President's Cabinet Committee. Executive and legislative elections are held concurrently across all three campuses in March.

=== Fraternities and sororities ===
The first fraternities and sororities were chartered on the campus in 1953 and 1968, many have followed. Approximately 12% of undergraduate students are active in social fraternities and sororities on campus.

== Athletics ==
Georgia Southern Athletics wordmark

Georgia Southern's athletic teams are known as the Eagles. The Eagles compete in baseball, basketball, rifle, football, golf, tennis, volleyball, soccer, softball, swimming and diving, cross country and track and field. The university's baseball team has participated in the College World Series twice (1973 and 1990). The university has two cheerleading squads, an all-female squad of 22 members and a co-ed squad of seven. The university offers, intramural teams for all varsity level sports, equestrian events, fencing, and judo.

=== Football ===
Georgia Southern's football team currently competes in NCAA Division I FBS as a member of the Sun Belt Conference. The football team won six NCAA Division I-AA national championships (1985, 1986, 1989, 1990, 1999 and 2000) prior to moving to Division I FBS. Georgia Southern announced on March 27, 2013, that it would move to the Sun Belt Conference in 2014, becoming bowl eligible in 2015. During Georgia Southern's last year in Division I FCS (2013), the football schedule remained the same, but they were ineligible for the FCS playoffs.
