= Georgia Southern University–East Georgia Campus =

Public college in Swainsboro, Georgia, US

Coordinates: 32°35′43″N 82°18′30″W

Georgia Southern University East Georgia Campus
- Logo of EGSC prior to its consolidation with Georgia Southern University.
- Former names: Emanuel County Junior College (1973–1988); East Georgia College (1988–2012); East Georgia State College (2012–2026)
- Type: Public college
- Established: 1973 (as Emanuel County Junior College)
- Parent institution: Georgia Southern University
- President: Kyle Marrero
- Students: 2,023 (Fall 2021)
- Location: Swainsboro, Georgia, U.S.
- Campus: Rural, 386 acres (156 ha)
- Colors: Blue and gold
- Nickname: Golden Eagles
- Sporting affiliations: NAIA – Continental
- Website: georgiasouthern.edu/east-georgia-campus
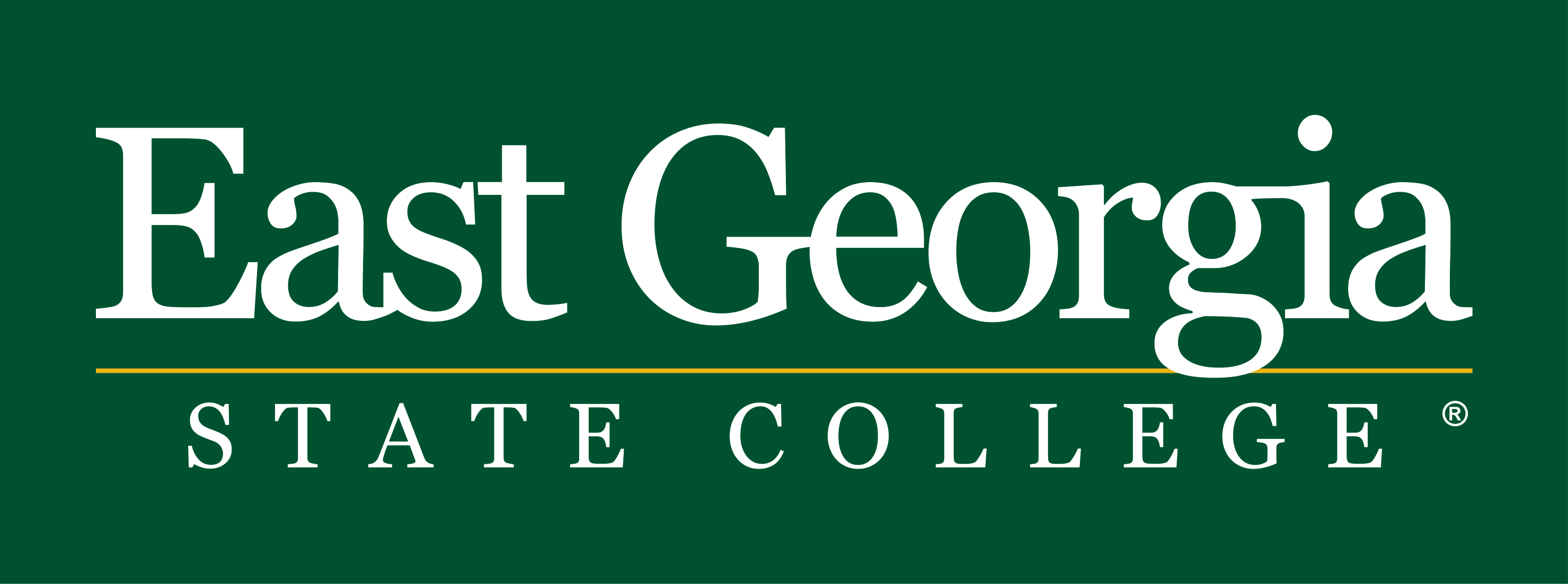

Georgia Southern University–East Georgia Campus, formerly East Georgia State College (EGSC), is one of four campuses of Georgia Southern University, a public university in the U.S. state of Georgia. The campus is located in Swainsboro, 37 miles (60 km) west of Georgia Southern's main campus in Statesboro. Established in 1973, EGSC was consolidated into Georgia Southern effective January 1, 2026.

== History ==
In 1956 and 1965, community leaders in Swainsboro and Emanuel County petitioned the state legislature to establish a two-year college in the area. In 1969, the University System of Georgia Board of Regents underwent a study to determine the need for additional two-year colleges in the state. A year later, the Swainsboro–Emanuel County area was approved as a prospective site with the stipulation that the city and county provide land and funding to build the campus.

In September 1971, the citizens of Emanuel County approved a $2.1 million bond issue and provided 207 acres (84 ha) of land within the city limits of Swainsboro for a new college. 190 acres (77 ha) of the site was donated by Luck Flanders Gambrell, the wife of then-U.S. Senator David Gambrell. In December of the same year, the Board of Regents granted final approval for Emanuel County Junior College. Then-Speaker of the Georgia House of Representatives and Emanuel County native George L. Smith II was instrumental in the college's establishment. In June 1972, temporary offices were set up in downtown Swainsboro and the college's faculty was hired while construction of the college campus began in December of the same year.

The college hosted its charter class of 167 students in the fall quarter of 1973 at a temporary site, as the campus would not be ready for another year. The college changed its name to East Georgia College in 1988 when the University System mandated that the term "Junior" be removed from the names of its two-year institutions and to give the college its regional identity. In the Board of Regents' June 2011 meeting, East Georgia College was granted approval to move to four-year status, allowing the college to offer limited bachelor's degree programs. With the change in its mission, the college was officially renamed East Georgia State College. The college admitted its first students into the Bachelor's program in Biology in fall 2012.

In April 2025, University System of Georgia Chancellor Sonny Perdue made a recommendation to the Board of Regents to consolidate EGSC with Georgia Southern University; the Board of Regents had previously consolidated Armstrong State University in Savannah with Georgia Southern in 2018. On April 15, 2025, the Regents held their monthly board meeting on the main campus of Georgia Southern, formally approving the consolidation of Georgia Southern and EGSC. The following day, the Regents and Georgia Southern leaders held a town hall in Swainsboro to address concerns among EGSC students, faculty, staff, alumni, and the Swainsboro community at-large regarding the forthcoming consolidation. In early June 2025, the Board of Regents, Georgia Southern leadership, and EGSC leadership revealed that the name for the Swainsboro campus would called Georgia Southern University–East Georgia Campus; additionally, Georgia Southern president Kyle Marrero served as the interim president of EGSC during the consolidation process effective July 1, 2025, after then-incumbent EGSC president David Schecter retired.

== Campus ==
Undergraduate demographics as of Fall 2023
Race and ethnicity	Total
Black	46%
White	38%
Hispanic	8%
Two or more races	5%
Unknown	2%
Asian	1%
Economic diversity
Low-income (Note: The percentage of students who received an income-based federal Pell grant intended for low-income students.)	62%
Affluent (Note: The percentage of students who are a part of the American middle class at the bare minimum.)	38%

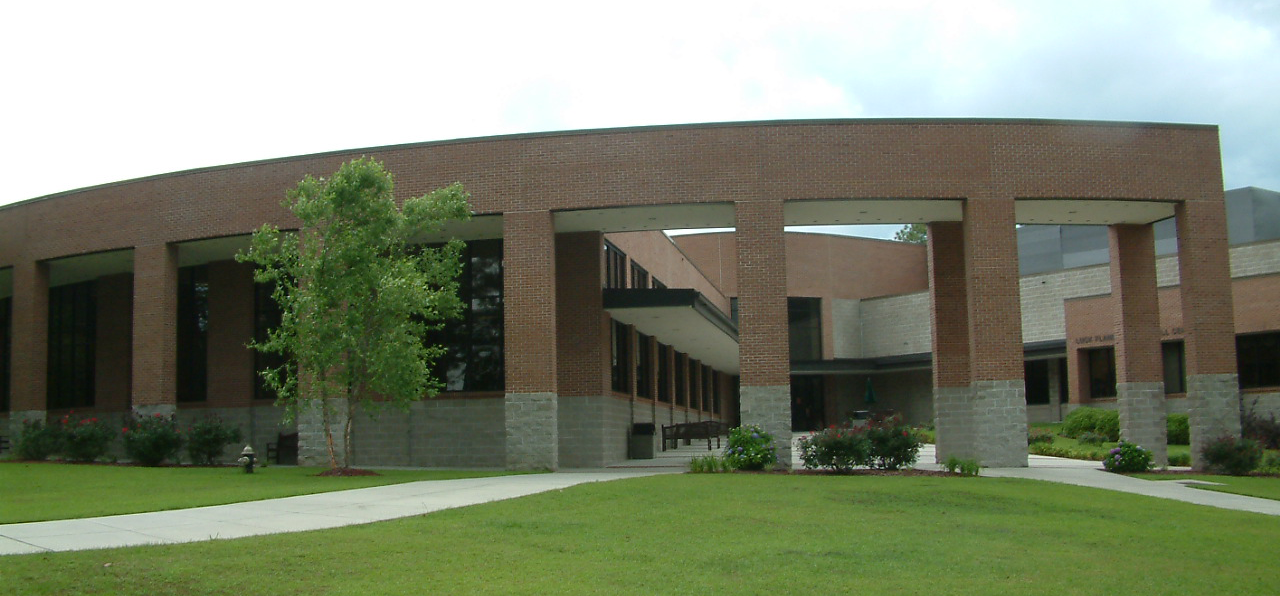
The Luck Flanders Gambrell Center

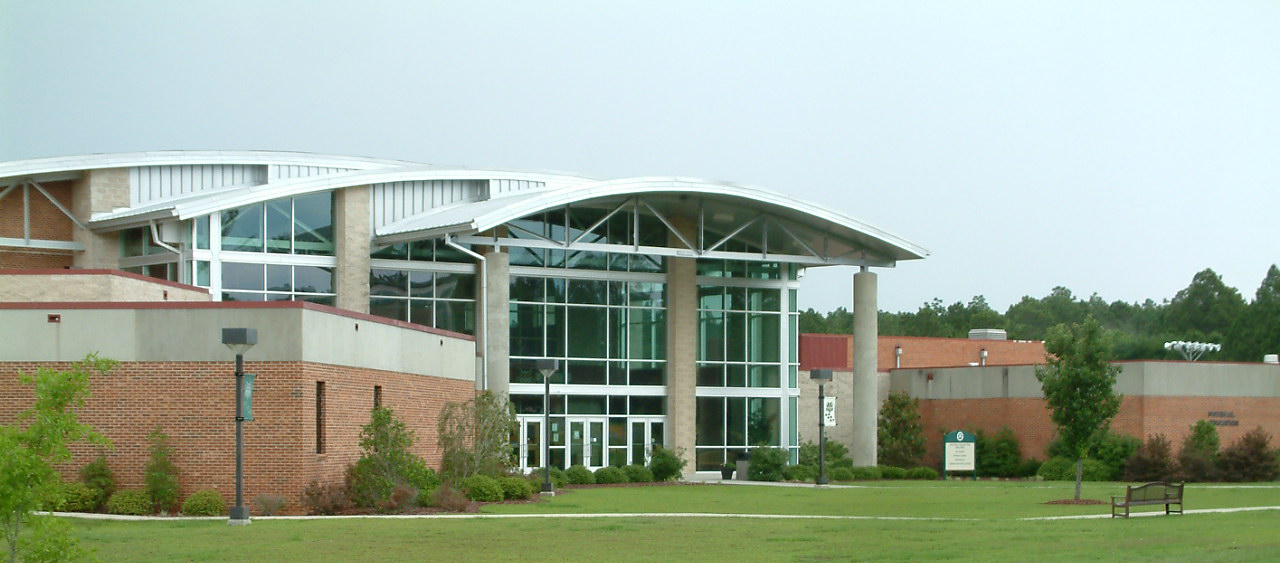
Physical Education Center

The college campus opened in 1974 with six buildings and has been expanded significantly since the turn of the 21st century. Opened in 2001, the Luck Flanders Gambrell Center houses the Learning Commons (college library, Academic Center for Excellence, and Common Grounds Coffee shop), main auditorium, classrooms, and administrative offices. In 2003, the Physical Education building was expanded with a new indoor gymnasium, fitness center, an art studio, additional classrooms, and offices for athletics. The Jean A. Morgan (JAM) Student Center was expanded and renovated in 2007, adding student meeting space and offices for admissions, financial aid, student records, business affairs and counseling and disabilities services. The JAM Center was expanded for a second time in 2020, adding student recreation space and a larger bookstore. In 2012, the college library was substantially renovated to accommodate the college's transition from two-year status to four-year status. The main campus also has an 18-hole disc golf course, 10k cross country course, outdoor tennis and basketball courts, a nature trail, Ezra Pond and Pa's Pond. In 2016, the campus was designated as a Bee Campus, and has applied for status as a Tree Campus. In 2017, the lower level of the Academic Building was expanded, adding additional biology laboratories and an 84-seat lecture hall.

The college opened a new southern entrance road, Madison Dixon Drive, named for one of the community leaders who pushed for the college's creation, at the intersection of Lambs Bridge Road and Meadowlake Parkway in early 2008, and the Sudie A. Fulford Community Learning Center was built near the new entrance in 2010. Named for a well known grade school teacher in the Swainsboro community, the center features an educational resource center for area K-12 students and teachers, meeting space for small conferences, educational outreach programs and summer camps, as well as a great room with a vaulted ceiling and fireplace and a full-dome planetarium. The center's construction was funded by a donation from Ada Lee Correll, Fulford's daughter and the wife of Georgia-Pacific CEO-emeritus A.D. "Pete" Correll.

In November 2009, the EGSC Foundation voted unanimously to appropriate 10 acres (4 ha) of land near the northern part of campus to construct the college's first on-campus residence hall. Eagle Pines, formerly Bobcat Villas, opened at the start of the 2011 fall semester and was expanded in the fall of 2016 through a USG P-3 initiative. The college's on-campus housing capacity is 412 students.

== Athletics ==
In fall 2005, the student body selected a mascot, the bobcat, to represent the college in club sports and non-athletic functions. In fall 2008, students in a college-wide referendum approved a $75 increase in student fees to support a formal intercollegiate athletics program, with the Board of Regents approving the athletics fee in their April 2009 meeting.

The college was a member of the Georgia Collegiate Athletic Association (Region XVII of the National Junior College Athletic Association) and played an abbreviated schedule in all sports in the 2009–10 academic year with full varsity-level play starting the following year. The college's sport offerings include men's and women's basketball, women's softball, and men's baseball. In summer 2010, the college constructed an athletics complex behind the gymnasium, adding a baseball field, softball field, new tennis courts, and related support facilities.

In only its fourth season of competition, the East Georgia Bocats men's basketball team clinched the college's first ever GCAA Championship and earned a bid into the 2013 NJCAA Men's Division I Basketball Tournament in Hutchinson, Kansas. In 2024, the women's basketball team clinched their first GCAA championship, earning a bid to the 2024 NJCAA Women's Division I Basketball Tournament in Casper, Wyoming.

Starting in 2026, after the consolidation with Georgia Southern University, the athletic program adopted a new athletics name, mascot, colors and logo. The new name of the athletic program is the Golden Eagles, adopting Georgia Southern's colors of blue and gold. In July 2026, the East Georgia Campus joined the National Association of Intercollegiate Athletics (NAIA) and left the NJCAA and the GCAA. The Golden Eagles are competing as an independent in its first year of NAIA competition with intentions to join the Southern States Athletic Conference (SSAC) in the 2027–28 academic year.

== Vision Series ==
The EGSC Vision Series was a community outreach initiative that brings programs of cultural and intellectual enrichment to East Georgia State College and the Swainsboro-Emanuel County area. Noteworthy speakers who have visited East Georgia State College include President and Mrs. Jimmy Carter, poet Maya Angelou, former Atlanta mayor and U.N. Ambassador Andrew Young, broadcast journalist Cokie Roberts, author and television commentator Bruce Feiler, former Chief Justice of the Georgia Supreme Court Leah Ward Sears, and former Georgia Governor, United States Secretary of Agriculture and incumbent Chancellor of the University System of Georgia Sonny Perdue. Vision Series lectures and concerts hosted at the college are free and open to the public.

The Vision Series also sponsored field trips to historical sites and locations of cultural interest, such as the Fox Theatre and the Georgia Aquarium.

== Satellite campuses ==
Prior to consolidation, East Georgia State College operated two satellite campuses in Statesboro and Augusta as collaborations with Georgia Southern University and Augusta University (AU), respectively. The purpose of EGSC Statesboro and EGSC Augusta was to serve students living within the local area as well as those who did not meet the freshmen admission requirements of the hosting institutions; those who are not eligible to attend EGSC were referred to either Ogeechee Technical College or Augusta Technical College where appropriate. Students enrolled at either satellite campus paid EGSC's tuition rate and fees, which also included the host institution's student services fees, allowing EGSC students to access most of the student services provided to Georgia Southern and Augusta University students, such as library, dining, health, transportation, and recreation services. EGSC students were not permitted to seek membership at fraternities and sororities or participate in varsity intercollegiate athletic programs at their hosting institution. After completing a minimum of 30 credit hours of college level coursework, as well as attaining a minimum GPA of 2.0, students could choose to transfer to their hosting institution or another university-level institution, or remain at EGSC to satisfy requirements for the Associate of Arts degree.

=== Statesboro ===
EGSC Statesboro (EGSC-S) was established in 1997. From its inception until July 2011, EGSC-S used leased office space to house its administrative functions and Georgia Southern classroom space for academic functions. In March 2010, the college broke ground on a new satellite center on U.S. Highway 301 South, near the main campus of Ogeechee Tech. This campus is in an unincorporated area, outside the city limits of Statesboro. The new campus opened just before the start of the 2011 fall semester and housed classroom space, a student computer lab, and a commons area in addition to its administrative functions. However, many student services and some classes are still hosted on the Georgia Southern campus.

In November 2018, The George-Anne, Georgia Southern's student newspaper, reported that EGSC officials plan to relocate the Statesboro Center to the Georgia Southern campus, citing student concerns with attending classes, accessing services, and participating in extracurricular activities at two discrete locations nearly four miles (6 km) apart. EGSC officials plan to use the Nessmith-Lane Center to house the Statesboro Center while Georgia Southern's Continuing and Professional Education (CPE) department would relocate to the EGSC Statesboro Center facility. EGSC Statesboro's relocation to the Nessmith-Lane Center took place over the 2021 winter break, and opened for students in the 2022 spring semester. Georgia Southern's renovation of the former EGSC Statesboro facility was completed in the spring of 2023; CPE director Dr. Diana Badakhsh stated that moving the CPE off the congested university campus has greatly improved patron access and program registrations.

In 2026, after the consolidation with Georgia Southern University, EGSC Statesboro campus was renamed to Georgia Southern University – East Georgia Center Statesboro.

=== Augusta ===
EGSC Augusta (EGSC-A) was established in 2013 in partnership with Augusta University to replace the "University College" program of the former Augusta State University following its consolidation with Georgia Health Sciences University to form Augusta University. ESGC-A was located on AU's Summerville campus. The second floor of Galloway Hall housed administrative and faculty offices, while classes were held throughout the Summerville Campus. Students residing in Aiken County and Edgefield County, South Carolina are eligible for an out-of-state tuition waiver.

In 2026, after the consolidation with Georgia Southern University, EGSC Augusta campus was renamed to Georgia Southern University – East Georgia Center Augusta; however, the Augusta Center was phased out following the conclusion of the 2026 spring semester.

== Location ==
The East Georgia Campus is on 386 acres (156 ha) of land in the city limits of Swainsboro, with the main entrance at the intersection of Lambs Bridge Road and Meadowlake Parkway, adjacent to the Pathway Technology Industrial Park. The campus's official street address is listed as 131 College Circle.

The city of Swainsboro is 15 miles (24 km) north of Exit 90 (U.S. Highway 1/Georgia State Route 4) on Interstate 16, almost halfway between Macon and Savannah. By automobile, Swainsboro is approximately a 45-minute drive from Statesboro, an hour-and-a-half drive from either Macon, Savannah, or Augusta, and three hours from Atlanta.
