= Georgia Southern Equestrian Team =

- Abbreviation: GSUET
- Formation: 1993
- Type: Intercollegiate Horse Association
- Headquarters: Evermore Farm
- Location: Brooklet, Georgia
- Region served: Region 3, Zone 5
- Leader: Elanor Ellis

The Georgia Southern Equestrian Team (GSUET) is a club sport available to students at Georgia Southern University. The club develops an understanding in equestrian activities and horsemanship and unites collegiate horse owners, riders, and anyone interested in horses. It introduces members to equine activities in the community. Team members who join the Intercollegiate Horse Show Association (IHSA) compete with other IHSA team in horse shows hosted by different barns in the southeast. Individuals and the team compete in Zone 5, Region 3 of the IHSA. Each member takes two lessons a week. The Georgia Southern Equestrian Team students are taught grooming, feeding, and health care skills. All riding disciplines are presented and the facility provides well-trained horses for the riders. The GSUET is funded mostly by its members' team fees. However, each year the team is also allotted a budget from Georgia Southern's CRI (Campus Recreation and Intramurals). Many of the saddles and other tack used by the team are purchased through CRI. Team members pay for their own riding lessons, riding attire, show clothes, and entry fees for shows.

== Location ==
The Georgia Southern Equestrian Team rides at Evermore Farm. . Evermore Farm is located in Bulloch County, Georgia, near Brooklet, Georgia and is about half an hour from the Georgia Southern University. Evermore Farm is a full service equestrian center.

== Accomplishments ==
Evermore Farm students have competed successfully since 1990 at local and national shows in several disciplines, including United States Equestrian Federation (USEF), American Quarter Horse Association (AQHA), Palomino Horse Breeders Association, (PHBA) Intercollegiate Horse Show Association (IHSA), Coastal Hunter Circuit (CHC), Progressive Show Jumping (PSJ) and 4-H. Their horses and riders have won top ribbons at many shows and events, including a World Champion, and Reserve National Champion.

At the IEA National Championship held in Conyers, Ga., the Georgia Southern Equestrian Team placed third out of 19 teams that qualified out of more than 200 teams nationwide. They also placed second at the Leefield finals.

== History ==
The Georgia Southern Equestrian Team was founded in 1993 by four members: Celest Youmans, Betsey Fagin, Wendy Wheeler, and Fran Becket. The first coach employed by the GSUET was a student coach, team member Fran Becket. The team used Wolfpen Farm facilities as their home base for shows and lessons. The team was not having good luck with finding horses that could participate with the team. They used mostly their own horses and borrowed some horses from the community for shows.

In 1998, the GSUET moved to Evermore Farm in Brooklet, about a 30-minute drive from the GSU campus. They also hired Elanor Ellis as their new coach, who is still the coach today. In 1999, a certified American Quarter Horse Association judge, Ms. Jones, left UGA and worked with Georgia Southern for a year to help improve the equestrian program.

== Showing ==
The team at Georgia Southern is part of a large network of equestrian teams in the southeast. The United States is divided into zones and each zone is divided into regions. Currently the GSUET is located in Zone 5, Region 3. The team competes against several colleges in the southeast including; Georgia Tech, Georgia State, Emory, Wesleyan, College of Charleston, Florida State, University of Florida, and University of Miami. Each year members of the GSUET compete to earn points in order to move up in their show classes, which range from beginner's walk/trot to the more experienced open levels. Once a rider earns enough points to move up a class, they qualify to compete at regionals. From regionals, first through third-place winners then advance to zones where the first and second-place winners move on to nationals, where many GSUET members have competed before. The GSUET made its presence well known at the 2006 nationals as its entire western team competed after winning first place in the region, and second in the zone. Along with the western team an English rider took tenth in Advanced Walk/ Trot/Canter.

== Fundraisers ==
On February 26, 2011, Georgia Southern University Equestrian Team hosted their third annual Spring Fling at Mill Creek Regional Park in Statesboro, Georgia. Proceeds from entertainment were donated to the Bulloch County Humane Society Fun activities included carnival rides, games, contests, and a petting zoo The Swinging Medallions, a local cover band, provided entertainment throughout the day, and a dance off competition was also held.
