= USS Sam Nunn =

Guided missile destroyer

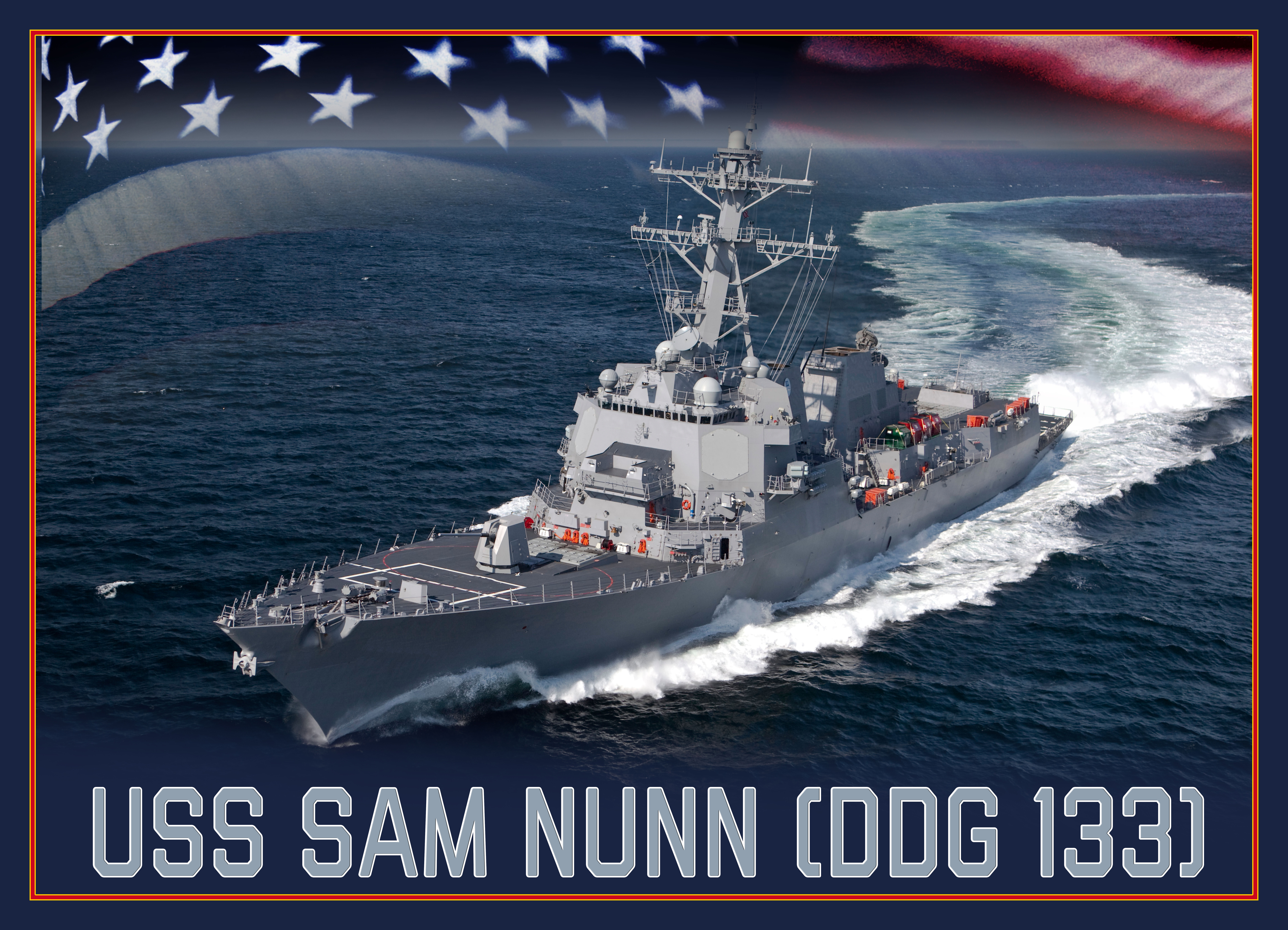
- Graphical depiction of USS Sam Nunn (DDG-133)

History

United States
- Name: Sam Nunn
- Namesake: Sam Nunn
- Awarded: 27 September 2018
- Builder: Ingalls Shipbuilding
- Laid down: 22 November 2024
- Sponsored by: Michelle Nunn
- Identification: Hull number: DDG-133
- Status: Under construction

General characteristics
- Class & type: Arleigh Burke-class destroyer
- Displacement: 9,217 tons (full load)
- Length: 510 ft (160 m)
- Beam: 66 ft (20 m)
- Propulsion: 4 × General Electric LM2500 gas turbines 100,000 shp (75,000 kW)
- Speed: 31 knots (57 km/h; 36 mph)
- Complement: 380 officers and enlisted
- Armament: Guns: 1 × 5-inch (127 mm)/62 Mk 45 Mod 4 (lightweight gun); 1 × 20 mm (0.8 in) Phalanx CIWS; 2 × 25 mm (0.98 in) Mk 38 machine gun system; 4 × 0.50 in (12.7 mm) caliber guns; Missiles: 1 × 32-cell, 1 × 64-cell (96 total cells) Mk 41 vertical launching system (VLS): RIM-66M surface-to-air missile; RIM-156 surface-to-air missile; RIM-174A Standard ERAM; RIM-161 anti-ballistic missile; RIM-162 ESSM (quad-packed); BGM-109 Tomahawk cruise missile; RUM-139 vertical launch ASROC; Torpedoes: 2 × Mark 32 triple torpedo tubes: Mark 46 lightweight torpedo; Mark 50 lightweight torpedo; Mark 54 lightweight torpedo
- Armor: Kevlar-type armor with steel hull. Numerous passive survivability measures.
- Aircraft carried: 2 × MH-60R Seahawk helicopters
- Aviation facilities: Double hangar and helipad

USS Sam Nunn (DDG-133) is a planned Arleigh Burke-class (Flight III) Aegis guided missile destroyer of the United States Navy. She was named on 6 May 2019 by Navy Secretary Richard V. Spencer in honor of Samuel Augustus Nunn, Jr. Nunn was a U.S. Senator representing Georgia, who served in Congress from 1972 to 1997, and was chairman of the Senate Armed Services Committee and the Permanent Subcommittee on Investigations. The ship's sponsor is Michelle Nunn, daughter of former Senator Nunn. Fabrication of the ship began on 12 December 2022.
