= Sam Nunn =

American lawyer and politician (born 1938)

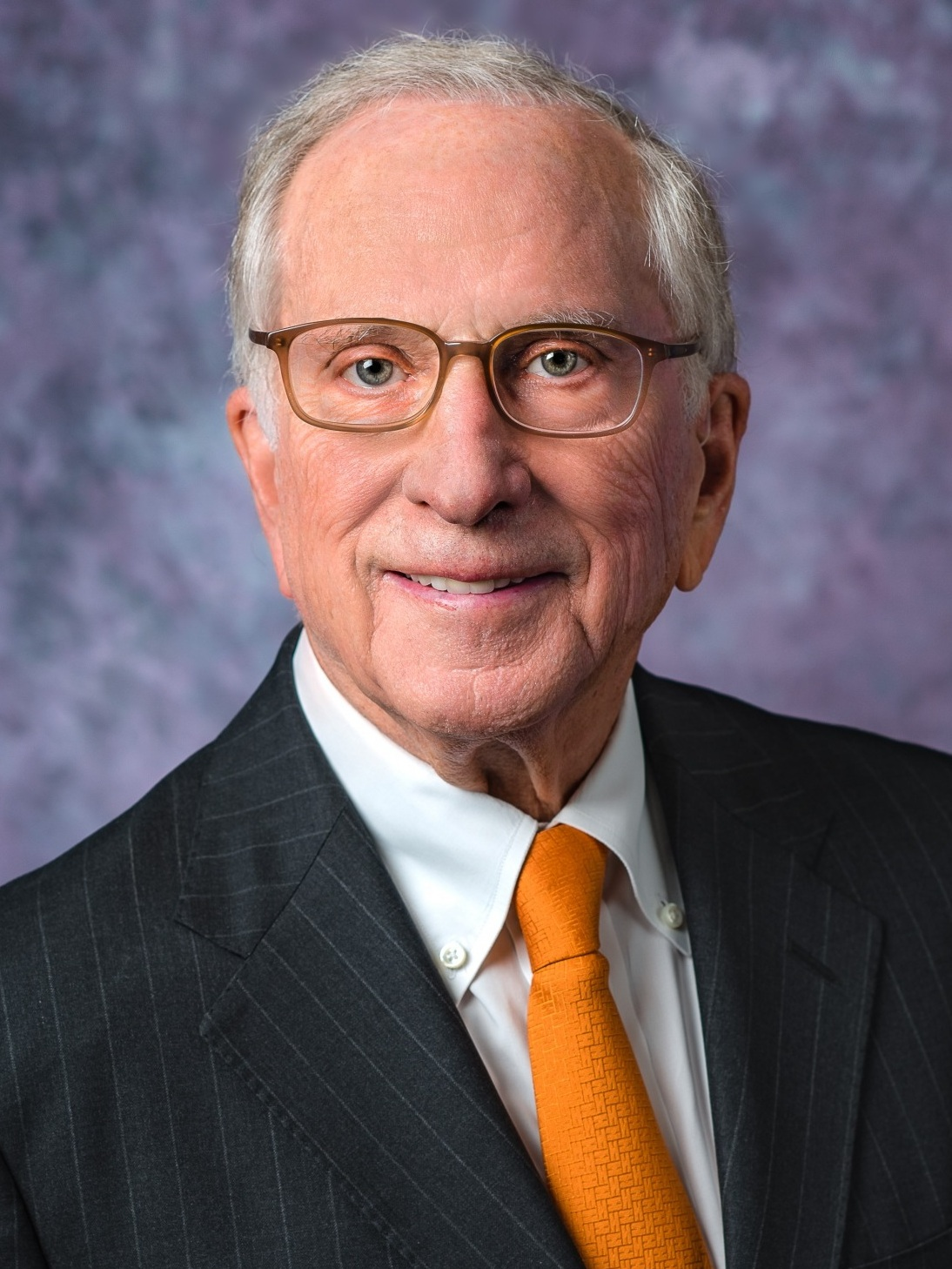
- Nunn, c. 2020

United States Senator from Georgia
- In office November 8, 1972 – January 3, 1997
- Preceded by: David Gambrell
- Succeeded by: Max Cleland
Senate positions
Chair of the Senate Armed Services Committee
In office January 3, 1987 – January 3, 1995
Preceded by	Barry Goldwater
Succeeded by	Strom Thurmond
Ranking Member of the Senate Armed Services Committee
In office January 3, 1995 – January 3, 1997
Preceded by	Strom Thurmond
Succeeded by	Carl Levin
In office September 1, 1983 – January 3, 1987
Preceded by	Scoop Jackson
Succeeded by	John Warner

Member of the Georgia House of Representatives from the 41st district Post 1
- In office January 13, 1969 – November 8, 1972
- Preceded by: Glenn Phillips
- Succeeded by: Guy Hill

Personal details
- Born: Samuel Augustus Nunn Jr. September 8, 1938 (age 88) Macon, Georgia, U.S.
- Party: Democratic
- Spouse: Colleen O'Brien (m. 1965)
- Children: 2, including Michelle
- Relatives: Carl Vinson (grand-uncle)
- Education: Georgia Institute of Technology (attended); Emory University (BA, LLB)

Military service
- Allegiance: United States
- Branch/service: United States Coast Guard
- Years of service: 1959–1968
- Unit: United States Coast Guard Reserve
- Nunn's voice Nunn on Frank Kelso's accountability for the Tailhook scandal. Recorded April 19, 1994

Samuel Augustus Nunn Jr. (born September 8, 1938) is an American politician who served as a United States senator from Georgia (1972–1997) as a member of the Democratic Party. While in the Senate, Nunn was involved in the Nunn–Lugar Cooperative Threat Reduction program, which aims to dismantle weapons of mass destruction, originally in the former Soviet Union. Nunn was also involved in the Goldwater–Nichols Act, which reformed the Department of Defense.

After leaving Congress, Nunn co-founded the Nuclear Threat Initiative (NTI), a nonprofit, nonpartisan global security organization focused on reducing nuclear, biological, and emerging technology threats imperiling humanity, for which he is the co-chair. His political experience and credentials on national defense reportedly earned him consideration as a potential running mate for presidential candidates John Kerry and Barack Obama after they became their party's nominees.

== Early life ==
Nunn was born in Macon, Georgia, the son of Mary Elizabeth (née Cannon) and Samuel Augustus Nunn, who was an attorney and mayor of Perry, Georgia. Nunn was raised in Perry. He is a grandnephew of Congressman Carl Vinson.

Nunn is an Eagle Scout and recipient of the Distinguished Eagle Scout Award from the Boy Scouts of America. In high school, Nunn was a standout athlete, captaining the school's basketball team to the state championship.

Nunn attended Georgia Tech in 1956, where he was initiated as a brother of Phi Delta Theta. He transferred to Emory University in 1959 and received his undergraduate degree in 1961. He then received a degree from the Emory University School of Law in 1962.

== Early career ==
After active-duty service in the United States Coast Guard, he served six years in the U.S. Coast Guard Reserve and attained the rank of petty officer. He was also a Congressional staff member.

Nunn returned to Perry, Georgia, where he practiced law and managed his family's farm. He later was president of the Perry Chamber of Commerce.

== Political career ==
Nunn first entered politics as a member of the Georgia House of Representatives in 1968. He was elected to the United States Senate in 1972, defeating appointed U.S. senator David H. Gambrell in the Democratic primary and U.S. Rep. Fletcher Thompson in the general election. Nunn was reelected in 1978, 1984, and 1990. After announcing that he would not run for a fifth term in 1996, Nunn retired from the U.S. Senate in 1997, offering a lack of "zest and enthusiasm" as justification.

During his tenure in the U.S. Senate, Nunn served as the chairman of the Senate Armed Services Committee and the Permanent Subcommittee on Investigations. He also served on the Intelligence and Small Business Committees. His legislative achievements include the landmark Department of Defense Reorganization Act, drafted with the late senator Barry Goldwater, and the Nunn–Lugar Cooperative Threat Reduction Program, which provided assistance to Russia and the former Soviet republics for securing and destroying their excess nuclear, biological and chemical weapons.

The Nunn–Lugar Cooperative Threat Reduction program deactivated more than 7,600 nuclear warheads. He was supposedly the "top choice" to be Secretary of Defense or State in 1992 and 1996 and in a prospective Gore cabinet in 2000.

Overall, Nunn was a moderate-to-conservative Democrat who often broke with his party on a host of social and economic issues. He opposed the budget bill of 1993, which included provisions to raise taxes to reduce the budget deficit. He neither supported nor opposed Hillary Clinton's attempt to establish universal health care, though he spoke out very strongly against the proposed insurance mandate.

Nunn actively worked to block President Bill Clinton's proposal to allow homosexuals to serve openly in the military. LGBT activist David Mixner openly referred to Nunn as an "old fashioned bigot" for opposing Clinton's plan to lift the military, though this was also reported to have angered the White House.

In 2008, Nunn endorsed a new Pentagon study to examine the issue of homosexuals serving openly in the military: "I think [when] 15 years go by on any personnel policy, it's appropriate to take another look at it—see how it's working, ask the hard questions, hear from the military. Start with a Pentagon study."

According to opensecrets.org, Sam Nunn received about $2.4 million during his 1989–1994 political career. His main contributors were the finance/insurance/real estate sector (totaling $411,665; $46,660 was received from Goldman, Sachs & Co.), the defense industry, lawyers and lobbyists, the alcohol and non-alcoholic beverages industry (including Coca-Cola), and the agriculture sector.

He voted in favor of school prayer, capping punitive damage awards, amending the U.S. Constitution to require a balanced budget, and limiting death penalty appeals. On certain issues like abortion, the environment, gun control, and affirmative action, Nunn took a more liberal line. He consistently voted in favor of increased immigration. One of his most controversial votes was his vote against the Gulf War.

In September 1994, Nunn, former president Jimmy Carter and former chairman of the Joint Chiefs of Staff Colin Powell were asked by President Bill Clinton to go to Haiti to force the departure of the military dictator Lieutenant General Raoul Cédras. In 1994, President Clinton publicly demanded that the Haitian government step aside and restore democratic rule. President Clinton deployed a large military force to surround the country in September 1994. Just before the troops reached Haiti, President Clinton sent a delegation led by Carter, the delegation wanted Nunn and Powell to urge Cédras to step down and leave the country. Cédras agreed and surrendered the government, and he and his top lieutenants left the country in October. Just days later, American forces escorted the country's elected president, Jean-Bertrand Aristide, into the capital. Afterwards, President Clinton lavished praise on Nunn's delegation for averting a military strike on the nation. "As all of you know, at my request, President Carter, Gen. Colin Powell, and Sen. Sam Nunn went to Haiti to facilitate the dictators' departure. I have been in constant contact with them for the last two days. They have worked tirelessly, almost around the clock, and I want to thank them for undertaking this crucial mission on behalf of all Americans", Clinton said.

Upon his exit from the Senate in late 1996, Nunn was the recipient of bipartisan praise from his colleagues. Republican Senator John Warner of Virginia concluded, "Senator Nunn quickly established himself as one of the leading experts in the Congress and, indeed, all of the United States on national security and foreign policy. He gained a reputation in our country and, indeed, worldwide as a global thinker, and that is where I think he will make his greatest contribution in the years to come, wherever he may be, in terms of being a global thinker. His approach to national security issues has been guided by one fundamental criteria: What Sam Nunn believes is in the best interest of the United States of America."

== Post-Congressional life ==
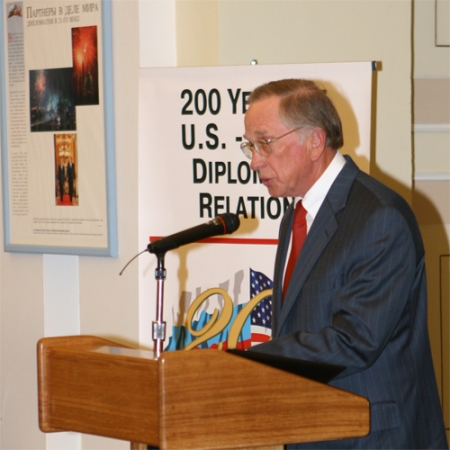
Nunn in 2007

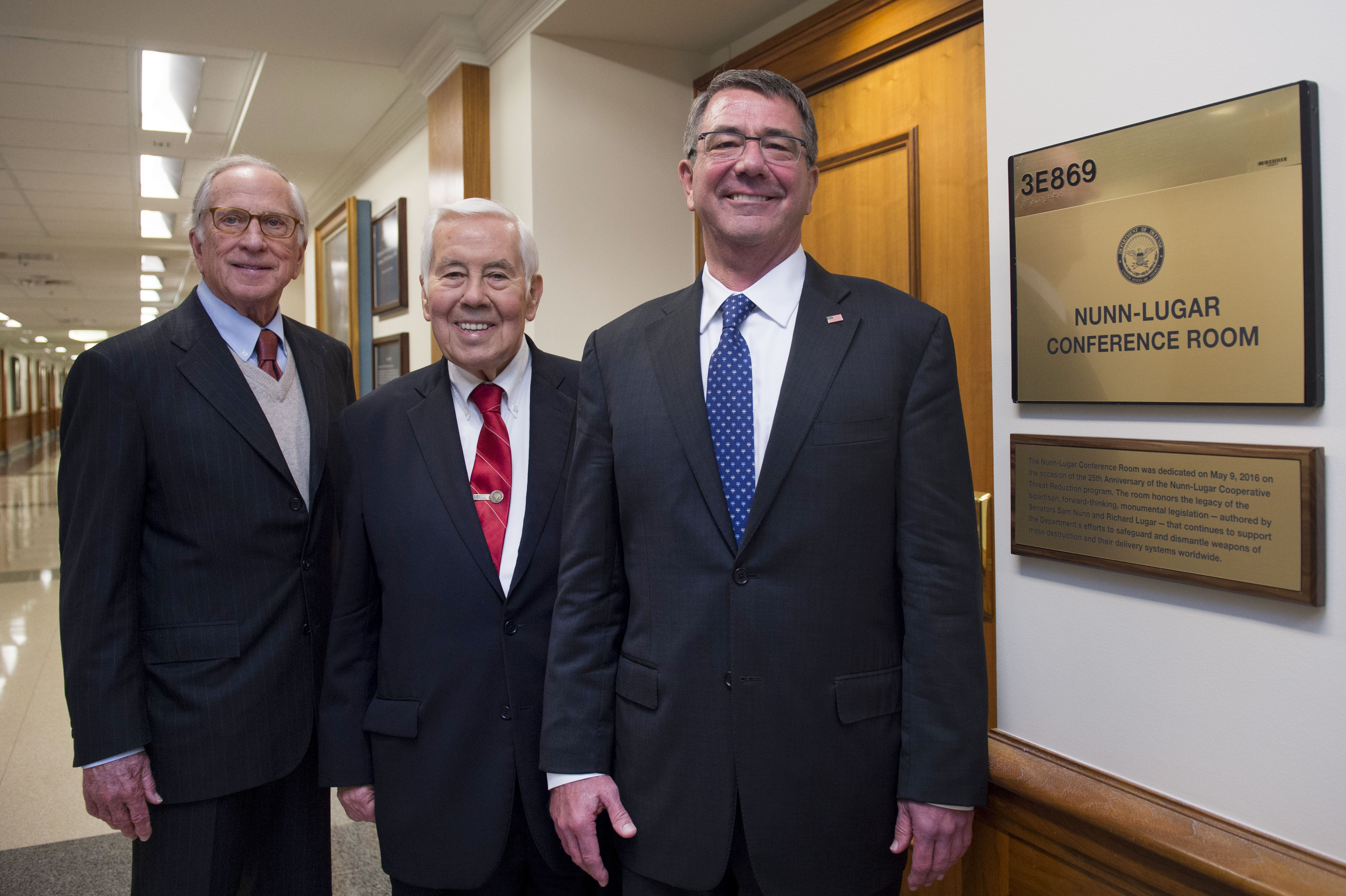
Nunn with Richard Lugar and Ash Carter in 2016

Nunn founded the Nuclear Threat Initiative in 2001 and he served as its co-chair and CEO until June 2017, when he became co-chair with Ted Turner and Ernest J. Moniz.

In addition to his work with the Nuclear Threat Initiative, Nunn continues his service in the public policy arena as a distinguished professor in the Sam Nunn School of International Affairs at Georgia Tech. There, he hosted the biennial Sam Nunn Policy Forum, a policy meeting that brings together noted academic, government, and private-sector experts on technology, public policy, and international affairs to address issues of immediate importance to the nation.

Nunn was an active advisory board member for the Partnership for a Secure America, a not-for-profit organization dedicated to recreating the bipartisan center in American national security and foreign policy. He signed a number of the organization's bipartisan policy statements on important issues ranging from climate change to enhanced interrogation practices and nonproliferation.

Additionally, Nunn is Chairman Emeritus of the board of trustees for the Center for Strategic and International Studies in Washington, D.C. At CSIS, Nunn and former senator and United States Secretary of Defense William Cohen joined for a series of public roundtable discussions designed to focus Americans on the seminal issues that the United States must face. The Cohen-Nunn Dialogues featured top thought leaders, public policy experts, prominent journalists, and leading scholars.

Nunn is a retired partner in the law firm of King & Spalding. He also was a board member of The Coca-Cola Company. In 2005, Nunn teamed up with former senator Fred Thompson to promote a new film, Last Best Chance, on the dangers of excess nuclear weapons and materials. The film was produced by the Nuclear Threat Initiative and aired on HBO in October 2005. He gave a full presentation outlining his goals at the Commonwealth Club of California.

Nunn—along with William Perry, Henry Kissinger, and George Shultz—called upon governments to embrace the vision of a world free of nuclear weapons, and in five Wall Street Journal op-eds proposed an ambitious program of urgent steps to the vision. The four created the Nuclear Security Project to advance this agenda. Nunn reinforced that agenda during a speech at the Harvard Kennedy School on October 21, 2008, saying, "I'm much more concerned about a terrorist without a return address that cannot be deterred than I am about deliberate war between nuclear powers. You can't deter a group who is willing to commit suicide. We are in a different era. You have to understand the world has changed."

In 2010, the four were featured in a documentary film entitled Nuclear Tipping Point, also produced by the Nuclear Threat Initiative. The film is a visual and historical depiction of the ideas laid forth in the Wall Street Journal op-eds and reinforces their commitment to a world without nuclear weapons and the steps that can be taken to reach that goal.

Nunn was a member of the supervisory council of the International Luxembourg Forum on Preventing Nuclear Catastrophe, a not-for-profit organization uniting leading experts on non-proliferation of nuclear weapons, materials and delivery vehicles. He also was on the Board of Advisors for the National Bureau of Asian Research, a non-profit, nonpartisan research institution.

In June 2013, Nunn added his voice to public support for an updated nuclear-arms limitation agreement with Russia. The 1992 Nunn-Lugar agreement had just expired at a time of increasing political tension between the two nations. Nunn applauded the determination of presidents Obama and Putin to renew its core provisions, while urging further work to agree on chemical and biological weapons limits also.

Nunn also was a member the Board of Curators for the Georgia Historical Society. He also was an advisory board member of Theranos, a fraudulent biotech company.

Several books have been written about the life and career of Sam Nunn. "The Best President the Nation Never Had: A Memoir of Working with Sam Nunn" was written in 2017 by his former Chief of Staff, Roland McElroy, and details Nunn's early years as a candidate for Senate. "Sam Nunn: Statesman of the Nuclear Age", by Frank Leith Jones, takes a more comprehensive look at Nunn's four-term Senate career, focusing on his accomplishments in nuclear and national security policy.

In 2019, the US Navy announced that an Arleigh Burke-class Missile Destroyer will be named the USS Sam Nunn.

== Speculation of 2008 presidential or vice-presidential candidacy ==
On August 19, 2007, Nunn said he would not decide on a presidential bid until after the 2008 primary season, when presumptive nominees by both parties would emerge. However, speculation over a Nunn White House bid ended on April 18, 2008, when he endorsed Democratic presidential contender Barack Obama.

Despite having publicly declared his lack of interest in being a candidate for vice president, Nunn continued to be mentioned by some political pundits and politicians as a potential running mate for Obama.

In an interview published on June 4, 2008, by The Guardian, former president Jimmy Carter said that he favored Nunn (a fellow Georgian) as Obama's possible choice for vice president. Peggy Noonan, a columnist and former Ronald Reagan and George H. W. Bush speechwriter also expressed her support for Nunn. In an interview with CNBC on August 22, 2008, billionaire investor Warren Buffett said that he favored Nunn as Obama's choice for vice president.

== Personal life ==
Nunn is married to the former Colleen O'Brien. Nunn met his future wife at the U.S. Embassy in Paris while she was working for the Central Intelligence Agency. They have two children, Mary Michelle Nunn and Samuel Brian Nunn. Michelle Nunn is the CEO of Points of Light and the CEO of CARE, and she ran unsuccessfully for the Senate in 2014.

According to the Lee Iacocca book, Talking Straight (1988), Chrysler Corporation came under scrutiny for selling new vehicles which were driven by company executives before the odometers were connected. Iacocca, Chrysler's CEO, was not concerned about the scandal at first but, within days of a meeting with Nunn in 1987 in which Nunn spoke of his own recently purchased Chrysler Fifth Avenue, Iacocca launched a detailed investigation into the claims, and extended warranties – and public apologies – to numerous current Chrysler owners.

In 1989, it was reported that Nunn had had a drunk driving crash in 1964. This report emerged during the United States Secretary of Defense confirmation hearings of ex-Senator John Tower. Nunn was opposing Tower due to Tower's alleged drinking problems.

Senator Nunn's membership in Augusta National Golf Club became the focus of a campaign by women seeking membership in the exclusive all-male club in 2002. The club had admitted its first African-American member in 1990 but was still closed to women. The Club chose to air the masters' without commercials rather than succumb to the pressure to open admissions to women.

Nunn is a Freemason.

== Awards and honors ==
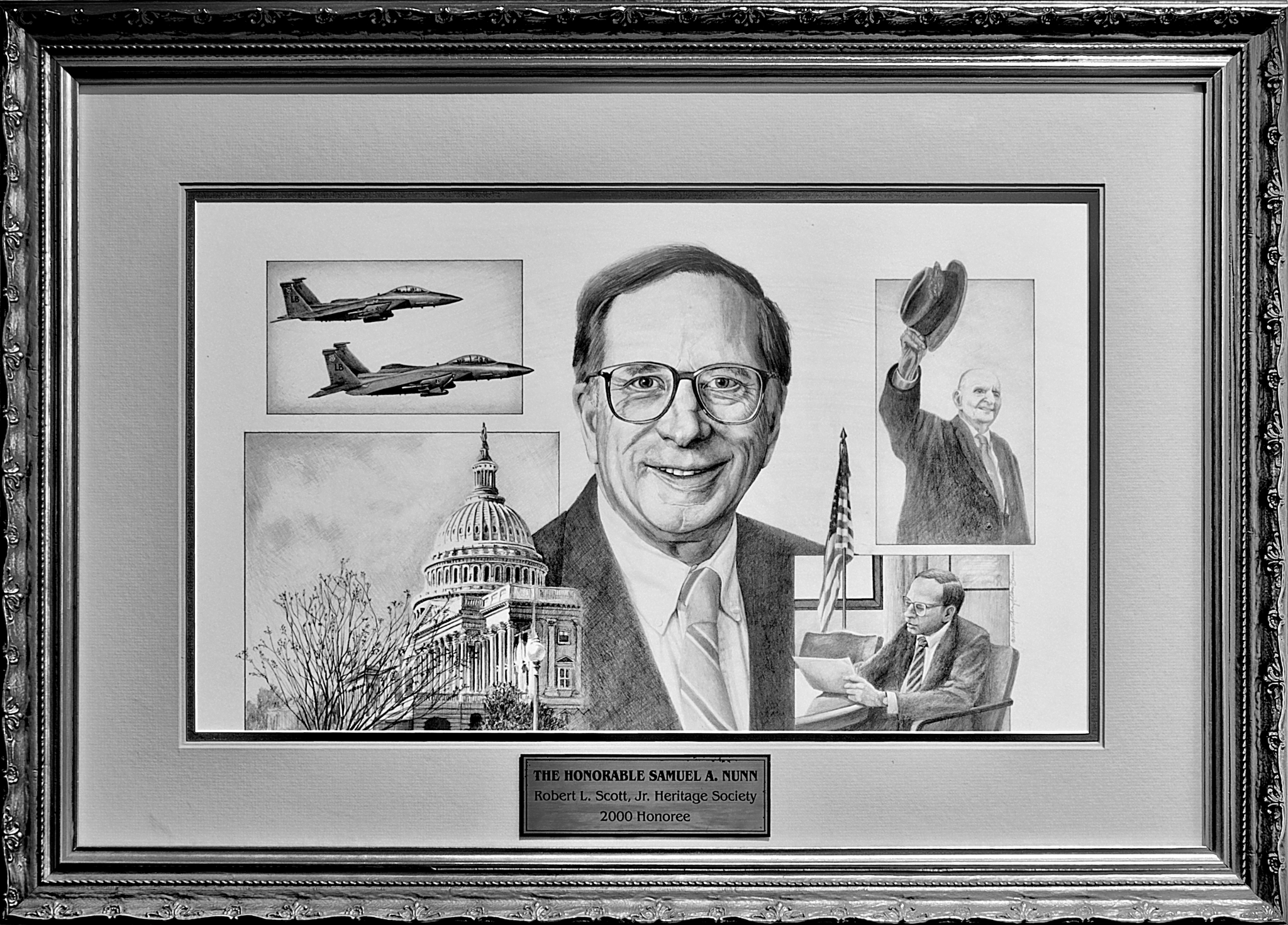
Painting of Nunn at the Museum of Aviation

- In 1990, the Georgia Institute of Technology renamed its international affairs department into the Sam Nunn School of International Affairs.
- In 1996, Nunn received the U.S. Senator John Heinz Award for Greatest Public Service by an Elected or Appointed Official, an award given out annually by the Jefferson Awards.
- In 2004, Nunn and Lugar were jointly awarded the Heinz Awards Chairman's Medal for their efforts.
- He got an honorary Doctor of Humane Letters degree from Oglethorpe University in 2006
- He was awarded the Hessian Peace Prize in 2008 for his commitment on nuclear disarmament and for combating nuclear terrorism.
- In 2009, Sam Nunn was presented the Lifetime Contributions to American Diplomacy Award by the American Foreign Service Association.
- 2011 Georgia Trustee. Given by the Georgia Historical Society, in conjunction with the governor of Georgia, to individuals whose accomplishments and community service reflect the ideals of the founding body of Trustees, which governed the Georgia colony from 1732 to 1752.
- 2011 Inaugural recipient of the annual Ivan Allen Jr. Prize for Social Courage, awarded by the Georgia Institute of Technology and Georgia Tech's Ivan Allen College of Liberal Arts
- 2013 Knight Commander of the Order of Merit of the Federal Republic of Germany
- Lone Sailor Award by the U.S. Navy Veterans Memorial in September 2014

== See also ==
- Anti-nuclear movement
- International Conference on Nuclear Disarmament

Party political offices
Preceded by Richard Russell	Democratic nominee for U.S. Senator from Georgia (Class 2); 1972, 1978, 1984, 1990	Succeeded by Max Cleland
Preceded by Chuck Robb	Chair of the Democratic Leadership Council; 1988–1990	Succeeded by Bill Clinton
U.S. Senate
Preceded by David Gambrell	United States Senator (Class 2) from Georgia; 1972–1997; Served alongside: Herman Talmadge, Mack Mattingly, Wyche Fowler, Paul Coverdell	Succeeded by Max Cleland
Preceded by Lowell Weicker	Ranking Member of the Senate Small Business Committee; 1981–1983	Succeeded by Dale Bumpers
Preceded by Scoop Jackson	Ranking Member of the Senate Armed Services Committee; 1983–1987	Succeeded by John Warner
Preceded by Barry Goldwater	Chair of the Senate Armed Services Committee; 1987–1995	Succeeded by Strom Thurmond
Preceded by Strom Thurmond	Ranking Member of the Senate Armed Services Committee; 1995–1997	Succeeded by Carl Levin
U.S. order of precedence (ceremonial)
Preceded by Tom Carper as Former U.S. Senator	Order of precedence of the United States as Former U.S. Senator	Succeeded by Debbie Stabenow as Former U.S. Senator
Preceded by Bob Packwood	Most senior living U.S. senator Sitting or Former; 2026–present	Current holder
