= 1978 United States Senate election in Georgia =

- November 7, 1978
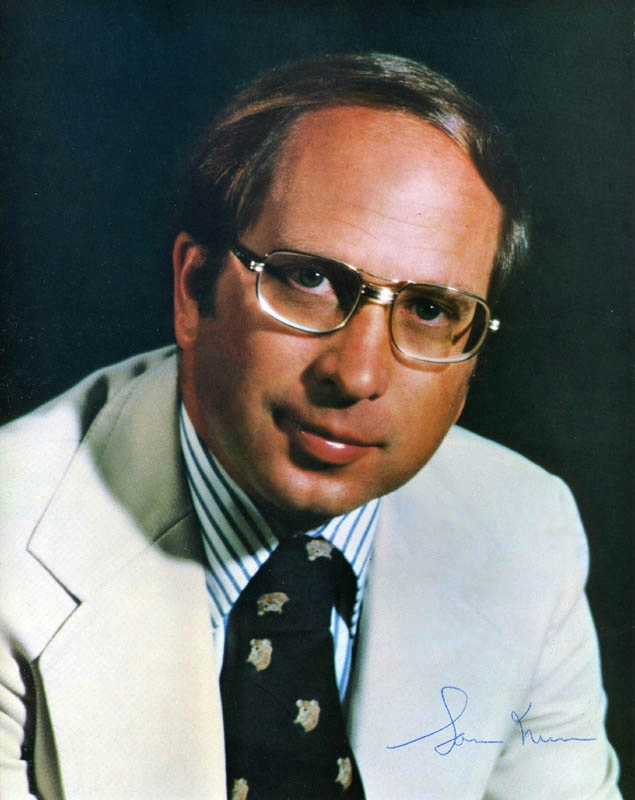

Nominee	Sam Nunn	John W. Stokes
Party	Democratic	Republican
Popular vote	536,320	108,808
Percentage	83.13%	16.87%
- County results Nunn: 50–60% 70–80% 80–90% >90%
U.S. senator before election
Sam Nunn
Democratic
Elected U.S. Senator
Sam Nunn
Democratic

The 1978 United States Senate election in Georgia was held on November 7, 1978. Incumbent Democratic U.S. Senator Sam Nunn won re-election to a second term.

== Major candidates ==
=== Democratic ===
- Sam Nunn, incumbent U.S. Senator

=== Republican ===
- John W. Stokes

== Results ==
General election results
Party	Candidate	Votes	%	±%
Democratic	Sam Nunn (incumbent)	536,320	83.13%	+29.17%
Republican	John W. Stokes	108,808	16.87%	−29.14%
Majority		427,512	66.27%	+58.32%
Turnout		645,128		
Democratic hold		Swing		

== See also ==
- 1978 United States Senate elections
