= U.S. National Tick Collection =

Tick specimen collection at Georgia Southern University

United States National Tick Collection
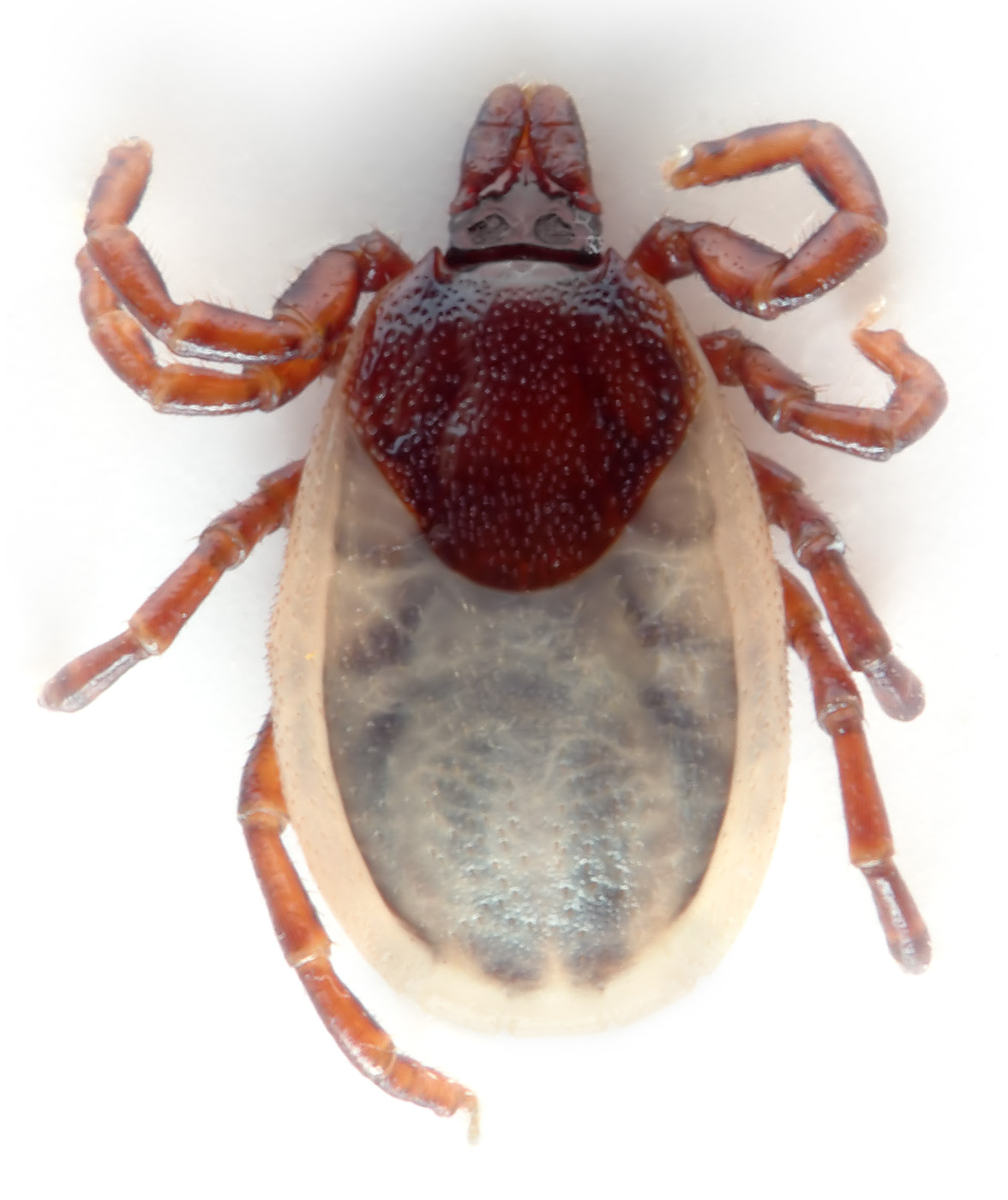
- Ixodes hexagonus (aka)
- Established: 1996
- Location: Georgia Southern University, Statesboro, Georgia
- Type: Ticks
- Curator: Lorenza Beati
- Website: Tick Collection

The U.S. National Tick Collection (USNTC) is the largest collection of ticks in the world. The vital function of the collection is to separate ticks that are medically and financially important from those that are common.

The collection is owned and curated by the Smithsonian Institution, but housed on the campus of Georgia Southern University in Statesboro, Georgia where it is under the auspices of the university's Institute of Arthropodology and Parasitology. The current curator of the collection is Lorenza Beati who was appointed late in 2011 and who is also an associate professor of Biology at Georgia Southern University. Beati holds an M.D. and Ph.D. The tick collection contains 850 separate species of tick. Evidence suggests that the collection is "larger than all other world tick collections combined" containing almost one million specimens. The tick collection aids parasitic research which is of interest to health and agriculture because some species of tick carry Lyme disease and Rocky Mountain spotted fever. The collection's specimens are freeze dried, bottled and coated so as to appear more vividly under a microscope.
