= The George-Anne =

Student newspaper at Georgia Southern University

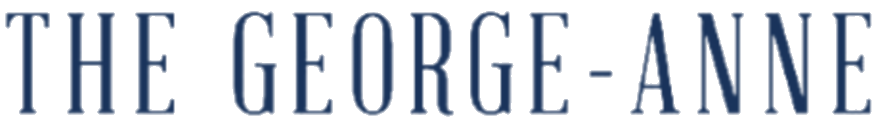
- Type: Student newspaper
- Owner: Georgia Southern University Office of Student Media
- Publisher: Georgia Southern University Office of Student Media
- Editor-in-chief: Vanessa Acala
- Founded: April 12, 1927
- Language: English (five times a week)
- Headquarters: 2023 Williams Center; 74 Georgia Avenue; Statesboro, Georgia, 30460 United States
- Website: thegeorgeanne.com

The George-Anne is the official student newspaper of Georgia Southern University in Statesboro, Georgia and was first published by the freshman class of the Georgia Normal School on April 12, 1927. As of the Spring Semester of 2009, The George-Anne has a twice-weekly circulation of 5,000, distributed in over 40 locations on campus and in various businesses throughout Statesboro. The newspaper has continuously published since then, making it the longest-running newspaper in Bulloch County. For a three-year period from 2005 to 2008, the newspaper was a daily newspaper called The George-Anne Daily. The paper places a large focus on campus news and sports, but as Georgia Southern has grown, a continued emphasis has been placed on issues and events in and around the town of Statesboro.

== History ==
The George-Anne was first published on April 12, 1927 and its name originates from a combination of the most popular male and female names of the time: George and Anne.
