= 1972 United States Senate elections in Georgia =

- November 7, 1972
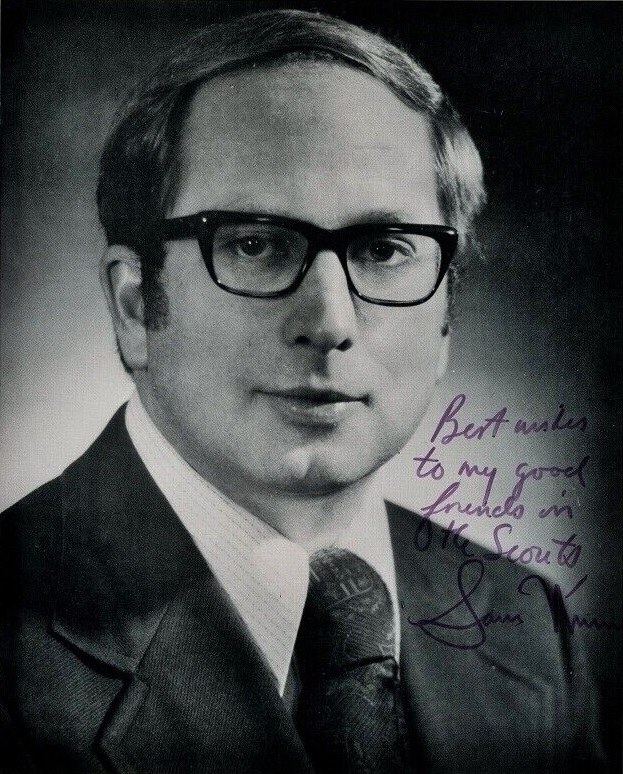

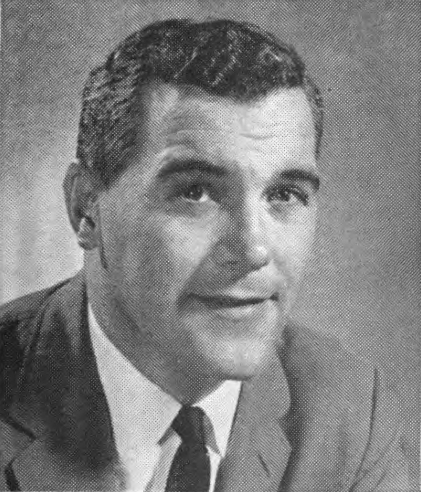
Nominee	Sam Nunn	Fletcher Thompson
Party	Democratic	Republican
Regular election	636,060; 53.96%	542,291; 46.01%
Special election	404,890; 51.98%	362,501; 46.54%
- Nunn: 40–50% 50–60% 60–70% 70–80% 80–90% >90% Thompson: 40–50% 50–60% 60–70% 70–80% No votes
U.S. senator before election
David H. Gambrell
Democratic
Elected U.S. Senator
Sam Nunn
Democratic

The 1972 United States Senate election in Georgia took place on November 7, 1972, alongside a special election to complete the unexpired term of Richard Russell Jr. Both races were won by Democratic state representative Sam Nunn over Republican congressman Fletcher Thompson.

Russell, who had been one of the leading figures in the racial segregationist movement for many years, died on January 21, 1971. Georgia governor Jimmy Carter appointed David H. Gambrell to succeed him. Gambrell was considered a moderate, and the open race attracted as many as nineteen candidates, including Thompson, who sought to become the first Republican elected to represent Georgia in the Senate since the Reconstruction era.

Primary elections were held on August 8. Thompson easily won the Republican nomination over nominal opposition, while Gambrell finished first in the Democratic primary with 31 percent of the vote. Because he did not win an outright majority, he advanced to an August 29 runoff election against Nunn. Nunn defeated Gambrell in the runoff with 54 percent of the vote.

Georgia was one of fifteen states (alongside Alabama, Arkansas, Colorado, Delaware, Iowa, Louisiana, Maine, Minnesota, Mississippi, Montana, New Hampshire, Rhode Island, South Dakota and West Virginia) won by Richard Nixon in 1972 that elected simultaneously Democrats to the United States Senate.

== Background ==
Richard Russell Jr. died on January 21, 1971, after 38 years in the United States Senate. On February 1, Georgia governor Jimmy Carter appointed state party chairman David H. Gambrell to fill the vacant seat until a successor could be duly elected.

== Democratic primary ==
=== Candidates ===
- William Aynes, Decatur attorney
- Bill Burson, Georgia state treasurer
- Gerry Dokka, Atlanta disc jockey and businessman
- Jack Dorsey, Mount Zion teacher
- David Gambrell, incumbent U.S. senator since 1971 and former chair of the Democratic Party of Georgia
- Austin D. Graham, Marietta union organizer
- D. J. Huges
- Thomas J. Irwin, Atlanta attorney
- Wyman C. Lowe, Atlanta attorney
- Sam Nunn, state representative from Perry and great-nephew of Carl Vinson
- Lloyd Russell, Atlanta newsman
- Darrell Runyon (also ran as Republican)
- J. B. Stoner, white supremacist, terrorist, and perennial candidate
- W. M. Wheeler
- Hosea Williams, civil rights activist, minister, and 1970 Republican nominee for secretary of state
- Ernest Vandiver, former governor of Georgia

Nunn announced his candidacy on March 15 at a rally in Perry, Georgia. Nunn's great-uncle, Carl Vinson, was among the approximately 1,500 in attendance, and he went on to give $500 to Nunn's campaign.

A total of fifteen candidates ran for the Democratic nomination, including incumbent Gambrell, Nunn, former governor Ernest Vandiver, segregationist J. B. Stoner, and civil rights activist Hosea Williams.

=== Results ===
In the initial round of voting on August 8, 1972, Gambrell finished first with 31.4% of the vote, followed by Nunn with 23.1%. Because no candidate received an outright majority, a runoff was held on August 29, which Nunn won with 54 percent of the vote. The New York Times referred to Nunn's victory as an "upset".

== Republican primary ==
=== Candidates ===
- Clarence I. Porter
- Darrell Runyan (also ran as Democratic)
- Fletcher Thompson, U.S. representative from East Point
- Howard Tucker

Thompson announced his candidacy at a gas station in Albany on March 17.

=== Results ===
Thompson decisively won the August 8 primary, receiving over 92 percent of the vote.

== General election ==
=== Campaign ===
The 1972 race focused more on candidates than on issues. Both Nunn and Thompson tried to align themselves with politicians who were viewed favorably in Georgia, and to dissociate themselves from those who were viewed unfavorably. Nunn, for example, harshly criticized his own party's nominee for President, George McGovern, pledging not to vote for him in that year's presidential election. Nunn suggested he might cast a write-in vote for George Wallace instead. Thompson, by contrast, tried to associate himself with President Richard Nixon, who was polling far ahead of McGovern in Georgia; he also distributed posters across the state linking Nunn to McGovern. As Jon Nordheimer noted in the New York Times several weeks before the election, "This maneuvering has become so frenzied, in fact, that the relative popularity of the President, Senator McGovern and Governor Wallace might seem to be the only real issues of the campaign."

Among the issues that the candidates focused on during the campaign was Jane Fonda's controversial visit to Vietnam. Thompson, then a member of the House Internal Security Committee, tried unsuccessfully to persuade his colleagues on the Committee to issue a subpoena against Fonda to answer his accusation that she had committed treason. Fonda did not testify, but A. William Olson did, to the effect that the United States Department of Justice had found no reason to prosecute Fonda for either treason or for violating the Logan Act.

Nunn's campaign was much more organized than was Thompson's. Nunn had support from numerous prominent Democrats from his state, including Gambrell, Carter, and Vandiver. By contrast, Thompson's campaign was "almost literally a one-man effort", and he started the race with virtually no footprint outside of his own district.

=== Endorsements ===
Nunn was endorsed by almost every establishment Democrat in Georgia, with the notable exception of Lieutenant Governor Lester Maddox, who did not endorse a candidate in the general election. Maddox did, however, support Nunn in his primary challenge to Gambrell.

Thompson tried to tie himself to Nixon, in the hopes of benefiting from Nixon's expected strong performance in Georgia. Nevertheless, Nixon declined to endorse Thompson when he visited Atlanta several weeks before the election. Some speculated that this may have been because the Nixon campaign was pessimistic about Thompson's chances. Instead of Nixon, both Arizona Senator Barry Goldwater, a former Republican presidential nominee, and Vice President Spiro Agnew threw their support behind Thompson.

Sam Nunn

Individuals

- Jimmy Carter, governor of Georgia
- David H. Gambrell, United States senator from Georgia
- Marvin Griffin, former governor of Georgia
- Lester Maddox, lieutenant governor of Georgia (primary only)
- Herman E. Talmadge, United States senator from Georgia
- Ernest Vandiver, former governor of Georgia
- George Wallace, former governor of Alabama and two-time presidential candidate

Newspapers

- The Atlanta Constitution
Fletcher Thompson

Individuals

- Spiro Agnew, vice president of the United States
- James L. Buckley, United States senator from New York
- Barry Goldwater, United States senator from Arizona and former Republican presidential nominee
- Richard Nixon, president of the United States

=== Results ===
Despite President Richard Nixon defeating George McGovern in Georgia in a landslide in the presidential election held on the same day, Nunn defeated Thompson in both the special election 52% to 47% and general election 54% to 46%, both of which appeared on the same ballot.

1972 United States Senate special election in Georgia
Party	Candidate	Votes	%
Democratic	Sam Nunn	404,890	51.98%
Republican	Fletcher Thompson	362,501	46.54%
Independent	Alice Conner	7,587	0.97%
Independent	George E. Schmidt	3,932	0.51%
Total votes		778,910	100.00%
Democratic hold			

1972 United States Senate election in Georgia
Party	Candidate	Votes	%
Democratic	Sam Nunn	636,060	53.96%
Republican	Fletcher Thompson	542,291	46.01%
Write-in		391	0.03%
Total votes		1,178,742	100.00%
Democratic hold			

== Aftermath ==
By defeating Thompson in the general election, Nunn became the first Democrat to win a Senate race in Georgia despite losing the white vote. Nunn's narrow victory over Thompson reflected a continuing decline in the Democratic Party's influence in Georgia, despite Nixon's landslide victory over McGovern there in the same year. The Watergate scandal further reduced the party's popularity in the state in 1974, and in that year's gubernatorial election, Republican gubernatorial candidate Ronnie Thompson lost with only 30% of the vote. When Newt Gingrich first ran unsuccessfully for Congress in 1974, he tried to model his campaign on Nunn's successful one in 1972.
