= David H. Gambrell =

American politician (1929–2021)

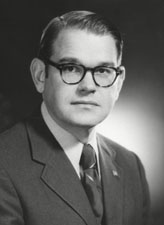
- Gambrell in 1972, while serving.

United States Senator from Georgia
- In office February 1, 1971 – November 7, 1972
- Appointed by: Jimmy Carter
- Preceded by: Richard Russell Jr.
- Succeeded by: Sam Nunn

Chair of the Georgia Democratic Party
- In office 1970–1971
- Preceded by: James H. Gray Sr.
- Succeeded by: Charles Kirbo

Personal details
- Born: David Henry Gambrell; December 20, 1929 Atlanta, Georgia, U.S.
- Died: May 6, 2021 (aged 91) Atlanta, Georgia, U.S.
- Party: Democratic
- Spouses: Luck Flanders (m. 1953; died 2015) Jeanne Martin (m. 2016)
- Children: 4
- Education: Davidson College; Harvard Law School

Military service
- Allegiance: United States
- Branch/service: United States Army
- Unit: Reserves

David Henry Gambrell (December 20, 1929 – May 6, 2021) was an American attorney and politician from the U.S. state of Georgia who served as the chairman of the Georgia Democratic Party in the early 1970s and served in the United States Senate from 1971 to 1972.

== Education and legal career ==
Gambrell was born in Atlanta, Georgia, on December 20, 1929, the son of Kathleen (Hagood) and Smythe Gambrell. He graduated from Davidson College in 1949, and received his JD, with honors, from Harvard Law School in 1952. He served in the reserves of the United States Army. After serving as a Teaching Fellow at Harvard and then as an associate and partner at the King & Spalding law firm in Atlanta, Gambrell founded Gambrell & Stolz, LLP in 1963. He served as president of the Atlanta Bar Association from 1965 to 1966, and as president of the State Bar of Georgia from 1967 to 1968. He also served in the American Bar Association House of Delegates, on the Board of Editors of the ABA Journal, and as Director of the National Legal Aid and Defender Association. In 2002, he received the State Bar of Georgia's Distinguished Service Award, and the Atlanta Bar Association, in 2007, honored him with their Leadership Award.

== Political career ==
Gambrell went on to take part in state politics, serving as chairman of the Georgia Democratic Party from 1970 to 1971. In 1971, upon the death of U.S. Senate member Richard Russell Jr., Governor of Georgia Jimmy Carter appointed Gambrell to the United States Senate to finish Russell's term, where he served during the years 1971 and 1972. While in the U.S. Senate he served as a member of the Banking Committee, Aeronautics and Space Committee, and Senate Select Committee on Small Business. Gambrell, a moderate, was defeated in the Democratic primary runoff in 1972 by the more conservative Sam Nunn, who went on to serve in the Senate for the next twenty-four years. Gambrell sought the Democratic nomination for Governor of Georgia in 1974, but fared badly, finishing behind Lester Maddox, George Busbee (the eventual winner), and Bert Lance.

== Other activities ==
Gambrell served in a number of public, business and civic roles, including the Directorships of three publicly held corporations, the Visiting Committees of Davidson College, Harvard Law School, Emory University and the Board of Directors of the Georgia Chamber of Commerce. He also served as Chairman of the Governor's Committee on Post-Secondary Education, as chairman of the Drafting Committee for the Education Article of the Constitution of Georgia, as a member on the Board of Curators of the Georgia Historical Society and as a trustee of the Lawyers Foundation of Georgia. He retired as a director of American Software, Inc. and was a trustee of the Georgia Legal History Foundation.

== Personal life ==
Gambrell was married to Luck Flanders Gambrell. They had four children. She was a philanthropist in her hometown of Swainsboro, Georgia, having donated 190 acres (77 ha) of land to establish East Georgia State College in 1971; the building housing the college's library bears her name to honor this gift. Luck died on June 29, 2015. Gambrell died in Atlanta on May 6, 2021, after a period of declining health, age 91.

U.S. Senate
| Preceded by Richard Russell Jr. | U.S. senator (Class 2) from Georgia; 1971–1972; Served alongside: Herman Talmadge | Succeeded by Sam Nunn |
