= 1920 United States Senate elections =

- November 2, 1920
- Class 3

34 of the 96 seats in the United States Senate 49 seats needed for a majority
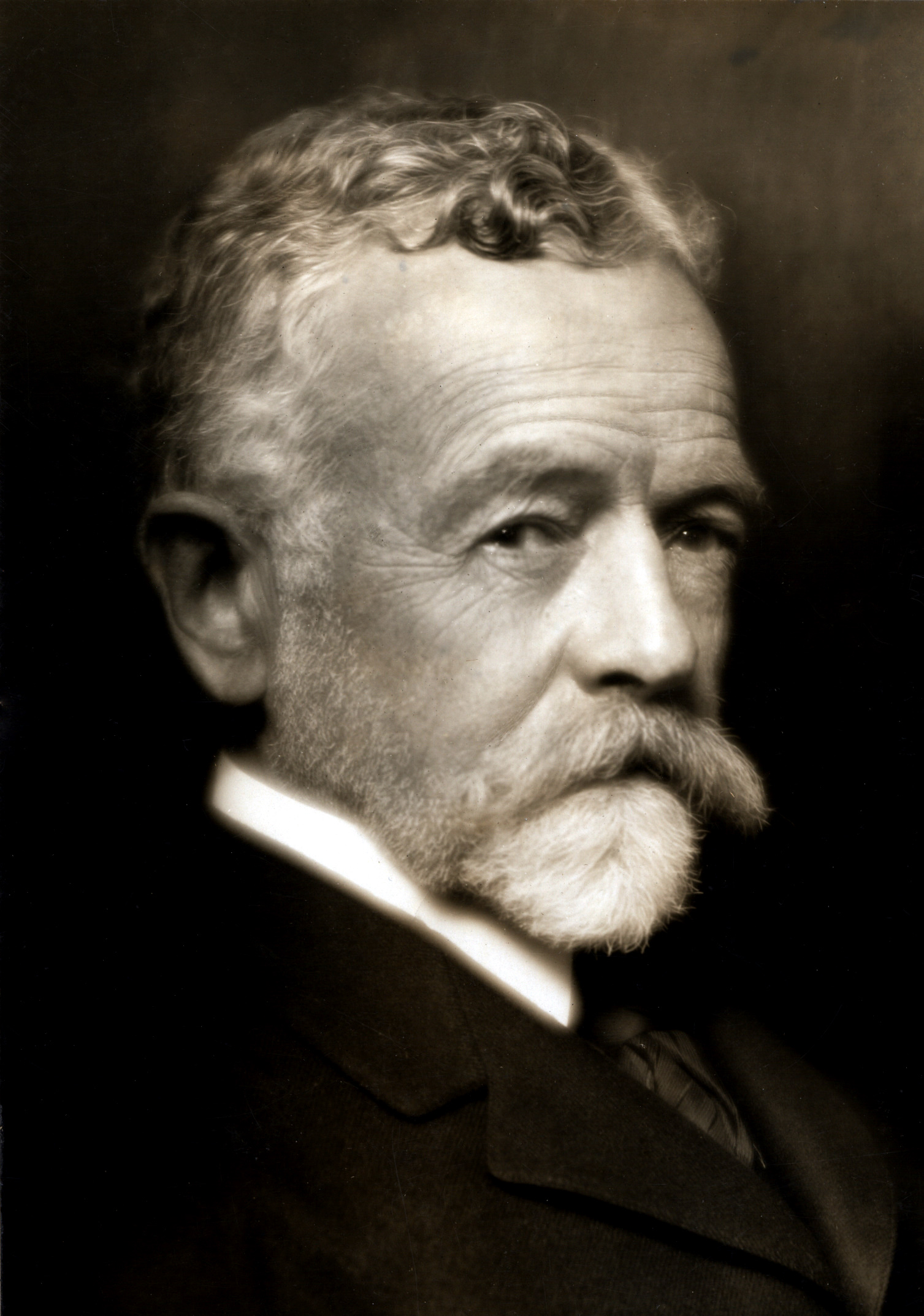

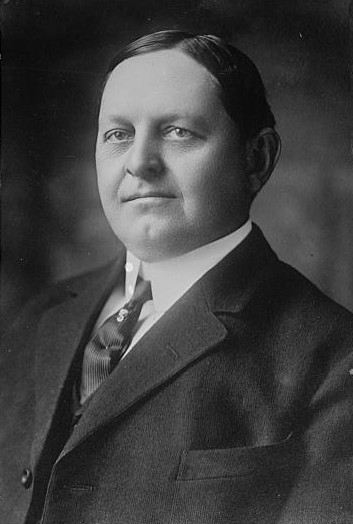
	Majority party	Minority party
Leader	Henry Cabot Lodge (Note: as Republican Conference Chairman and unofficial majority leader)	Oscar Underwood
Party	Republican	Democratic
Leader since	March 4, 1919	April 27, 1920
Leader's seat	Massachusetts	Alabama
Seats before	49	47
Seats after	59	37
Seat change	▲10	▼10
Seats up	15	19
Races won	25	9
- Results of the elections: Democratic hold Republican gain Republican hold No election
Majority Leader before election
Henry Cabot Lodge
Republican
Elected Majority Leader
Henry Cabot Lodge
Republican

The 1920 United States Senate elections were elections for the United States Senate that coincided with the presidential election of Warren G. Harding. The 32 seats of Class 3 were contested in regular elections, and special elections were held to fill vacancies. Democrat Woodrow Wilson's unpopularity allowed Republicans to win races across the country, winning ten seats from the Democrats and providing them with an overwhelming 59-to-37 majority. The Republican landslide was so vast that Democrats lost over half of their own seats this year and failed to win a single race outside the Southern United States. In fact, this is the most recent occasion where every race decided by under 10 points voted for the same party. This showcased the sheer strength of the Republicans' performance in this election.

Held seven years after the ratification of the Seventeenth Amendment to the United States Constitution in 1913, these were the first Senate elections held in which every incumbent Senator had previously been elected by popular vote, with no remaining Senators leftover from the old system of appointment by state legislature.

== Events of the election ==
Since the passage of the Seventeenth Amendment in 1913, these elections were the closest in which the winning party in almost every Senate election mirrored the winning party for their state in the presidential election, with Kentucky being the only Senate race not to mirror their presidential result. No other Senate election cycle in a presidential year would come close to repeating this feat until 2016, in which the result of every Senate race mirrored the corresponding state's result in the presidential election. Coincidentally, that election cycle involved the same class of Senate seats, Class 3. This is also one of only five occasions where 10 or more Senate seats changed party in an election, with the other occasions being in 1932, 1946, 1958, and 1980.

As of 2025, the 59 seats held after this election cycle remains the highest number of seats that the Republican Party has held as the result of an election cycle. This number rose to 60, the highest number of seats the Republicans have ever held, after Democratic senator Josiah O. Wolcott of Delaware accepted an offer from Republican governor William D. Denney to become Chancellor of the Delaware Court of Chancery, allowing Denney to name Republican T. Coleman du Pont to replace Wolcott, a seat du Pont held until the next election, in which both a special election was held for the remainder of the term and a regular election was held as the seat was normally up then, both of which du Pont lost narrowly to Democrat Thomas F. Bayard Jr. In addition, the 22-seat majority is the largest majority that the Republicans have achieved in any election since. Furthermore, this was the last time the Democrats won less than 10 Senate seats in a single election cycle.

== Gains, losses, and holds ==
=== Retirements ===
Two Republicans and three Democrats retired instead of seeking re-election. One Democrat retired instead of seeking election to finish the unexpired term.

State	Senator	Replaced by
Alabama (special)	B. B. Comer	J. Thomas Heflin
Colorado	Charles S. Thomas	Samuel D. Nicholson
Illinois	Lawrence Y. Sherman	William B. McKinley
Louisiana	Edward J. Gay	Edwin S. Broussard
Ohio	Warren G. Harding	Frank B. Willis
South Dakota	Edwin S. Johnson	Peter Norbeck

=== Defeats ===
Ten Democrats and one Republican sought re-election but lost in the primary or general election.

State	Senator	Replaced by
Arizona	Marcus A. Smith	Ralph H. Cameron
Arkansas	William F. Kirby	Thaddeus H. Caraway
California	James D. Phelan	Samuel M. Shortridge
Georgia	Hoke Smith	Thomas E. Watson
Idaho	John F. Nugent	Frank R. Gooding
Kentucky	J. C. W. Beckham	Richard P. Ernst
Maryland	John W. Smith	Ovington Weller
Nevada	Charles Henderson	Tasker Oddie
North Dakota	Asle Gronna	Edwin F. Ladd
Oklahoma	Thomas Gore	John W. Harreld
Oregon	George E. Chamberlain	Robert N. Stanfield

=== Post-election changes ===
State	Senator	Replaced by
Delaware	Josiah O. Wolcott	T. Coleman du Pont
New Mexico	Albert B. Fall	Holm O. Bursum
Georgia	Thomas E. Watson	Rebecca L. Felton
Pennsylvania (class 1)	Philander C. Knox	William E. Crow
Pennsylvania (class 1)	William E. Crow	David A. Reed
Pennsylvania (class 3)	Boies Penrose	George Wharton Pepper
Iowa	William S. Kenyon	Charles A. Rawson
Michigan	Truman H. Newberry	James J. Couzens

== Change in composition ==
=== Before the elections ===
		D_{1}	D_{2}	D_{3}	D_{4}	D_{5}	D_{6}	D_{7}	D_{8}
D_{18}	D_{17}	D_{16}	D_{15}	D_{14}	D_{13}	D_{12}	D_{11}	D_{10}	D_{9}
D_{19}	D_{20}	D_{21}	D_{22}	D_{23}	D_{24}	D_{25}	D_{26}	D_{27}	D_{28}
D_{38} Ky. Ran	D_{37} Idaho; Ran	D_{36} Ga. Ran	D_{35} Fla. Ran	D_{34} Colo. Retired	D_{33} Calif. Ran	D_{32} Ark. Ran	D_{31} Ariz. Ran	D_{30} Ala. (sp); Retired	D_{29} Ala. (reg); Ran
D_{39} La. Retired	D_{40} Md. Ran	D_{41} Nev. Ran	D_{42} N.C. Ran	D_{43} Okla. Ran	D_{44} Ore. Ran	D_{45} S.C. Ran	D_{46} S.D. Ran	D_{47} Va. (sp); Ran	R_{49} Wisc. Ran
Majority →									R_{49} Wisc. Ran
R_{39} Kan. Ran	R_{40} Mo. Ran	R_{41} N.H. Ran	R_{42} N.Y. Ran	R_{43} N.D. Ran	R_{44} Ohio; Retired	R_{45} Pa. Ran	R_{46} Utah; Ran	R_{47} Vt. Ran	R_{8} Wash. Ran
R_{38} Iowa; Ran	R_{37} Ind. Retired	R_{36} Ill. Ran	R_{35} Conn. Ran	R_{34}	R_{33}	R_{32}	R_{31}	R_{30}	R_{29}
R_{19}	R_{20}	R_{21}	R_{22}	R_{23}	R_{24}	R_{25}	R_{26}	R_{27}	R_{28}
R_{18}	R_{17}	R_{16}	R_{15}	R_{14}	R_{13}	R_{12}	R_{11}	R_{10}	R_{9}
		R_{1}	R_{2}	R_{3}	R_{4}	R_{5}	R_{6}	R_{7}	R_{8}

=== Election results ===
		D_{1}	D_{2}	D_{3}	D_{4}	D_{5}	D_{6}	D_{7}	D_{8}
D_{18}	D_{17}	D_{16}	D_{15}	D_{14}	D_{13}	D_{12}	D_{11}	D_{10}	D_{9}
D_{19}	D_{20}	D_{21}	D_{22}	D_{23}	D_{24}	D_{25}	D_{26}	D_{27}	D_{28}
R_{59} S.D. Gain	D_{37} Va. (sp); Elected (Note: Appointee elected)	D_{36} S.C. Re-elected	D_{35} N.C. Re-elected	D_{34} La. Hold	D_{33} Ga. Hold	D_{32} Fla. Re-elected	D_{31} Ark. Hold	D_{30} Ala. (sp); Hold	D_{29} Ala. (reg); Re-elected
R_{58} Ore. Gain	R_{57} Okla. Gain	R_{56} Nev. Gain	R_{55} Md. Gain	R_{54} Ky. Gain	R_{53} Idaho; Gain	R_{52} Colo. Gain	R_{51} Calif. Gain	R_{50} Ariz. Gain	R_{49} Wisc. Re-elected
Majority →									R_{49} Wisc. Re-elected
R_{39} Kan. Re-elected	R_{40} Mo. Re-elected	R_{41} N.H. Re-elected	R_{42} N.Y. Re-elected	R_{43} N.D. Hold	R_{44} Ohio; Hold	R_{45} Pa. Re-elected	R_{46} Utah; Re-elected	R_{47} Vt. Re-elected	R_{48} Wash. Re-elected
R_{38} Iowa; Re-elected	R_{37} Ind. Re-elected	R_{36} Ill. Hold	R_{35} Conn. Re-elected	R_{34}	R_{33}	R_{32}	R_{31}	R_{30}	R_{29}
R_{19}	R_{20}	R_{21}	R_{22}	R_{23}	R_{24}	R_{25}	R_{26}	R_{27}	R_{28}
R_{18}	R_{17}	R_{16}	R_{15}	R_{14}	R_{13}	R_{12}	R_{11}	R_{10}	R_{9}
		R_{1}	R_{2}	R_{3}	R_{4}	R_{5}	R_{6}	R_{7}	R_{8}

Key	D_{#} / Democratic; R_{#} / Republican

== Race summary ==
=== Special elections during the 66th Congress ===
In these special elections, the winner was seated during 1920 or before March 4, 1921; ordered by election date.

State	Incumbent			Results	Candidates
State	Senator	Party	Electoral history	Results	Candidates
Alabama (Class 2)	B. B. Comer	Democratic	1920 (appointed)	Interim appointee retired. New senator elected November 2, 1920. Democratic hold.	▌ ✓ J. Thomas Heflin (Democratic) 69.3%; ▌C. P. Lunsford (Republican) 29.5%; ▌W. H. Chichester (Socialist) 1.2%
Virginia (Class 2)	Carter Glass	Democratic	1920 (appointed)	Interim appointee elected November 2, 1920.	▌ ✓ Carter Glass (Democratic) 91.3%; ▌J. R. Pollard (Republican) 8.7%

=== Elections leading to the 67th Congress ===
In these general elections, the winners were elected for the term beginning March 4, 1921; ordered by state.

All of the elections involved the Class 3 seats.

State	Incumbent			Results	Candidates
State	Senator	Party	Electoral history	Results	Candidates
Alabama	Oscar Underwood	Democratic	1914	Incumbent re-elected.	▌ ✓ Oscar Underwood (Democratic) 66.1%; ▌L. H. Reynolds (Republican) 33.1%; ▌A. M. Forsman (Socialist) 0.8%
Arizona	Marcus A. Smith	Democratic	1912 (new state); 1914	Incumbent lost re-election. Republican gain.	▌ ✓ Ralph H. Cameron (Republican) 55.2%; ▌Marcus A. Smith (Democratic) 44.8%
Arkansas	William F. Kirby	Democratic	1916 (special)	Incumbent lost renomination. Democratic hold.	▌ ✓ Thaddeus H. Caraway (Democratic) 65.9%; ▌Charles F. Cole (Republican) 34.1%
California	James D. Phelan	Democratic	1914	Incumbent lost re-election. Republican gain.	▌ ✓ Samuel M. Shortridge (Republican) 49.0%; ▌James D. Phelan (Democratic) 40.7%; ▌James S. Edwards (Prohibition) 6.3%; ▌Elvina S. Beals (Socialist) 4.0%
Colorado	Charles S. Thomas	Democratic	1913 (special); 1914	Incumbent lost re-election as a Nationalist. Republican gain.	▌ ✓ Samuel D. Nicholson (Republican) 54.5%; ▌Tully Scott (Democratic) 39.3%; ▌G. F. Stevens (Farmer–Labor) 3.1%; ▌Charles S. Thomas (National) 3.0%
Connecticut	Frank B. Brandegee	Republican	1905 (special); 1909; 1914	Incumbent re-elected.	▌ ✓ Frank B. Brandegee (Republican) 59.3%; ▌Augustine Lonergan (Democratic) 36.1%; ▌Martin F. Plunkett (Socialist) 2.8%; Others: ▌Emil L. G. Hohenthal (Prohibition) 0.8%; ▌Josephine B. Bennett (Farmer–Labor) 0.6%; ▌Charles J. Backofen (Socialist Labor) 0.4%
Florida	Duncan U. Fletcher	Democratic	1909 (appointed); 1909 (special); 1914	Incumbent re-elected.	▌ ✓ Duncan U. Fletcher (Democratic) 69.5%; ▌John Moses Cheney (Republican) 26.0%; ▌M. J. Martin (Socialist) 2.5%; ▌G. A. Klock (White Republican) 2.0%
Georgia	Hoke Smith	Democratic	1911 (special); 1914	Incumbent lost renomination. Democratic hold.	▌ ✓ Thomas E. Watson (Democratic) 94.9%; ▌Harvey S. Edwards (Independent) 5.1%
Idaho	John F. Nugent	Democratic	1918 (appointed); 1918 (special)	Incumbent lost re-election. Republican gain. Incumbent resigned January 14, 1921 to give successor preferential seniority. Winner appointed January 15, 1921.	▌ ✓ Frank R. Gooding (Republican) 54.1%; ▌John F. Nugent (Democratic) 45.9%
Illinois	Lawrence Y. Sherman	Republican	1913 (special); 1914	Incumbent retired. Republican hold.	▌ ✓ William B. McKinley (Republican) 66.8%; ▌Peter A. Waller (Democratic) 26.8%; ▌Gustave T. Fraenckel (Socialist) 3.2%; Others: ▌John Fitzpatrick (Farmer–Labor) 2.4%; ▌Frank B. Vennum (Prohibition) 0.5%; ▌Joseph B. Moody (Socialist Labor) 0.15%
Indiana	James E. Watson	Republican	1916 (special)	Incumbent re-elected.	▌ ✓ James E. Watson (Republican) 54.6%; ▌Thomas Taggart (Democratic) 41.1%; Others: ▌Francis M. Wampler (Socialist) 1.9%; ▌Francis J. Dillon (Farmer–Labor) 1.3%; ▌Oulla Bayhinger (Prohibition) 1.1%
Iowa	Albert B. Cummins	Republican	1908 (special); 1914	Incumbent re-elected.	▌ ✓ Albert B. Cummins (Republican) 61.4%; ▌Claude R. Porter (Democratic) 37.4%; Others: ▌H. W. Cowles (Farmer–Labor) 1.0%; ▌Arthur S. Dowler (Socialist Labor) 0.1%
Kansas	Charles Curtis	Republican	1907 (special); 1907; 1913 (lost); 1914	Incumbent re-elected.	▌ ✓ Charles Curtis (Republican) 64.0%; ▌George H. Hodges (Democratic) 33.4%; ▌Dan Beedy (Socialist) 2.6%
Kentucky	J. C. W. Beckham	Democratic	1914	Incumbent lost re-election. Republican gain.	▌ ✓ Richard P. Ernst (Republican) 50.3%; ▌J. C. W. Beckham (Democratic) 49.7%
Louisiana	Edward J. Gay	Democratic	1918 (special)	Incumbent retired. Democratic hold.	▌ ✓ Edwin S. Broussard (Democratic); Unopposed
Maryland	John W. Smith	Democratic	1908 (special); 1908; 1914	Incumbent lost re-election. Republican gain.	▌ ✓ Ovington Weller (Republican) 47.3%; ▌John W. Smith (Democratic) 43.3%; ▌G. D. Iverson Jr. (Independent) 5.4%; Others: ▌William A. Toole (Socialist) 1.7%; ▌William A. Hawkins (Independent) 1.7%; ▌Frank N. H. Lang (Labor) 0.6%
Missouri	Selden P. Spencer	Republican	1918 (special)	Incumbent re-elected.	▌ ✓ Selden P. Spencer (Republican) 53.7%; ▌Breckinridge Long (Democratic) 44.5%
Nevada	Charles Henderson	Democratic	1918 (appointed); 1918 (special)	Incumbent lost re-election. Republican gain.	▌ ✓ Tasker Oddie (Republican) 42.1%; ▌Charles Henderson (Democratic) 37.9%; ▌Anne Martin (Independent) 18.2%
New Hampshire	George H. Moses	Republican	1918 (special)	Incumbent re-elected.	▌ ✓ George H. Moses (Republican) 57.7%; ▌Raymond B. Stevens (Democratic) 41.6%; ▌William H. Wilkins (Socialist) 0.6%
New York	James W. Wadsworth Jr.	Republican	1914	Incumbent re-elected.	▌ ✓ James W. Wadsworth Jr. (Republican) 52.4%; ▌Harry C. Walker (Democratic) 32.9%; ▌Jacob Panken (Socialist) 7.8%; ▌Ella A. Boole (Prohibition) 5.8%
North Carolina	Lee S. Overman	Democratic	1903; 1909; 1914	Incumbent re-elected.	▌ ✓ Lee S. Overman (Democratic) 57.5%; ▌A. E. Holton (Republican) 42.5%
North Dakota	Asle Gronna	Republican	1911 (special); 1914	Incumbent lost renomination. Republican hold.	▌ ✓ Edwin F. Ladd (Republican) 59.8%; ▌Hector H. Perry (Democratic) 40.2%
Ohio	Warren G. Harding	Republican	1914	Incumbent retired to run for U.S. President. Republican hold. Incumbent resigned January 13, 1921, having won the Presidency. Winner appointed January 14, 1921.	▌ ✓ Frank B. Willis (Republican) 59.1%; ▌William Alexander Julian (Democratic) 40.8%
Oklahoma	Thomas Gore	Democratic	1907 (new state); 1909; 1914	Incumbent lost renomination. Republican gain.	▌ ✓ John W. Harreld (Republican) 50.6%; ▌Scott Ferris (Democratic) 44.5%; ▌A. A. Bagwell (Socialist) 4.8%
Oregon	George E. Chamberlain	Democratic	1909; 1914	Incumbent lost re-election. Republican gain.	▌ ✓ Robert N. Stanfield (Republican) 50.7%; ▌George E. Chamberlain (Democratic) 43.5%
Pennsylvania	Boies Penrose	Republican	1897; 1903; 1909; 1914	Incumbent re-elected.	▌ ✓ Boies Penrose (Republican) 59.9%; ▌John A. Farrell (Democratic) 27.2%; ▌Leah C. Marion (Prohibition) 7.4%
South Carolina	Ellison D. Smith	Democratic	1909; 1914	Incumbent re-elected.	▌ ✓ Ellison D. Smith (Democratic); Unopposed
South Dakota	Edwin S. Johnson	Democratic	1914	Incumbent retired. Republican gain.	▌ ✓ Peter Norbeck (Republican) 50.1%; ▌Tom Ayres (Independent) 24.1%; ▌U. S. G. Cherry (Democratic) 20.0%; ▌Richard Olsen Richards (Independent) 5.5%
Utah	Reed Smoot	Republican	1903; 1909; 1914	Incumbent re-elected.	▌ ✓ Reed Smoot (Republican) 56.6%; ▌Milton H. Welling (Democratic) 38.5%; ▌J. Alex Beven (Socialist Farmer Labor) 4.9%
Vermont	William P. Dillingham	Republican	1900 (special); 1902; 1908; 1914	Incumbent re-elected.	▌ ✓ William P. Dillingham (Republican) 78.0%; ▌Howard E. Shaw (Democratic) 21.9%
Washington	Wesley L. Jones	Republican	1909; 1914	Incumbent re-elected.	▌ ✓ Wesley L. Jones (Republican) 56.4%; ▌C. L. France (Farmer–Labor) 25.4%; ▌George F. Cotterill (Democratic) 17.8%
Wisconsin	Irvine Lenroot	Republican	1918 (special)	Incumbent re-elected.	▌ ✓ Irvine Lenroot (Republican) 41.6%; ▌James Thompson (Independent) 34.7%; ▌Paul S. Reinsch (Democratic) 13.2%; ▌Frank J. Weber (Socialist) 9.8%; ▌Clyde D. Mead (Prohibition) 0.8%

== Closest races ==
Nine races had a margin of victory under 10%:

State	Party of winner	Margin
Kentucky	Republican (flip)	0.6%
Maryland	Republican (flip)	4.0%
Nevada	Republican (flip)	4.2%
Oklahoma	Republican (flip)	6.1%
Wisconsin	Republican	6.9%
Oregon	Republican (flip)	7.2%
Idaho	Republican (flip)	8.2%
California	Republican (flip)	8.3%
Missouri	Republican	9.2%

The tipping point state was Colorado, with a margin of 15.2%.

== Alabama ==
=== Alabama (regular) ===
1920 United States Senate election in Alabama
- November 2, 1920
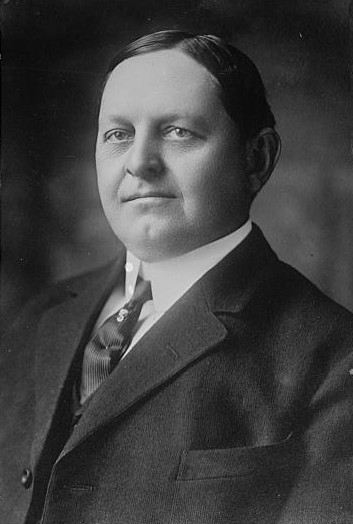

Nominee	Oscar Underwood	L. H. Reynolds
Party	Democratic	Republican
Popular vote	154,664	77,337
Percentage	66.10%	33.05%
- County results Underwood: 50–60% 60–70% 70–80% 80–90% >90% Reynolds: 50–60% 60–70%
U.S. senator before election
Oscar Underwood
Democratic
Elected U.S. senator
Oscar Underwood
Democratic

Alabama election
Party	Candidate	Votes	%
Democratic	Oscar Underwood (incumbent)	154,664	66.10%
Republican	L. H. Reynolds	77,337	33.05%
Socialist	A. M. Forsman	1,984	0.85%
Majority		77,327	33.05%
Turnout		233,985	
Democratic hold			

=== Alabama (special) ===
1920 United States Senate special election in Alabama
- November 2, 1920
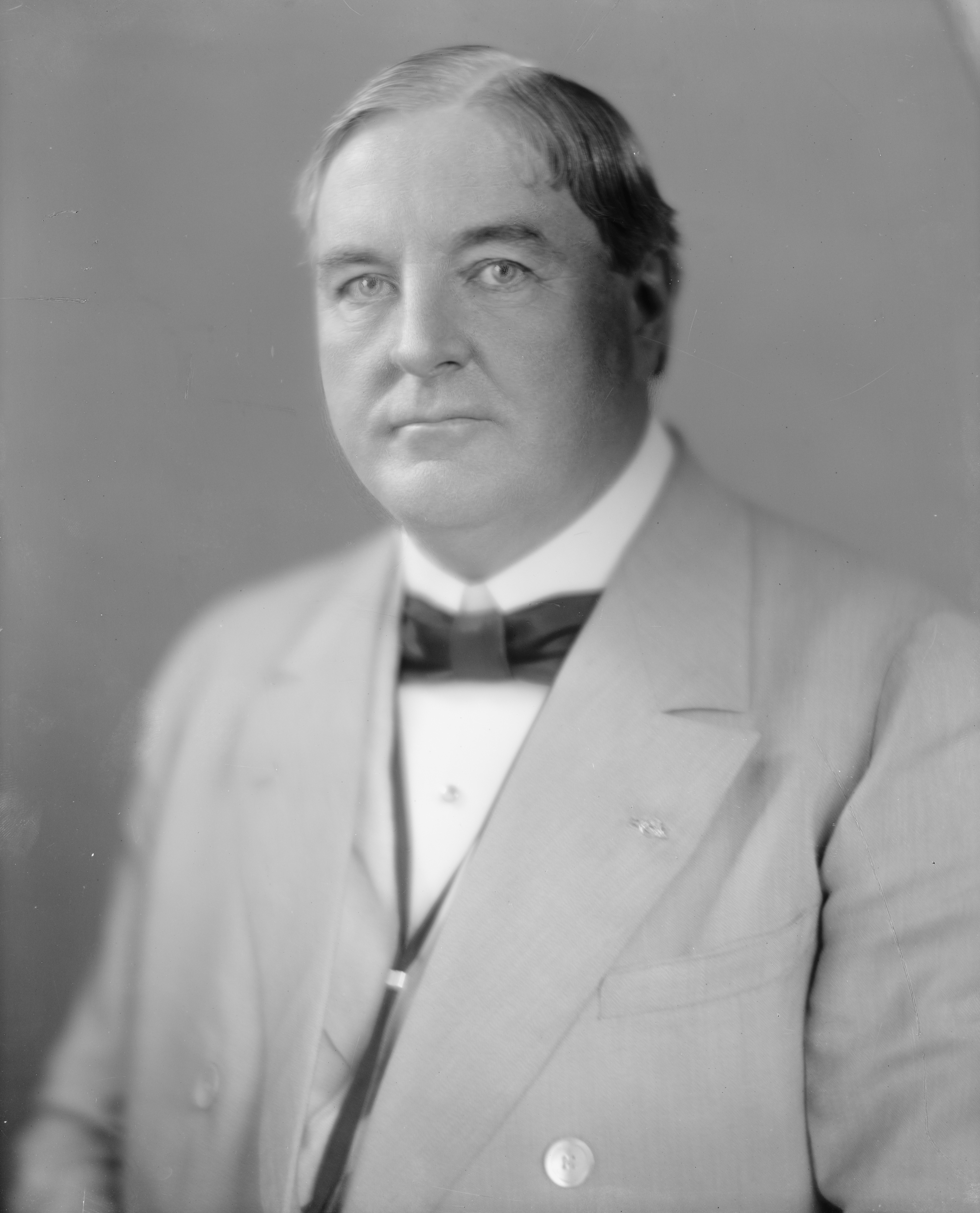

Nominee	J. Thomas Heflin	C. P. Lunsford
Party	Democratic	Republican
Popular vote	160,680	68,460
Percentage	69.27%	29.51%
- County results Heflin: 50–60% 60–70% 70–80% 80–90% >90% Lunsford: 50–60% 60–70%
U.S. senator before election
B. B. Comer
Democratic
Elected U.S. senator
J. Thomas Heflin
Democratic

Alabama special election
Party	Candidate	Votes	%
Democratic	J. Thomas Heflin	160,680	69.27%
Republican	C. P. Lunsford	68,460	29.51%
Socialist	W. H. Chichester	2,820	1.22%
Majority		92,220	39.76%
Turnout		231,960	
Democratic hold			

== Arizona ==
1920 United States Senate election in Arizona
- November 2, 1920
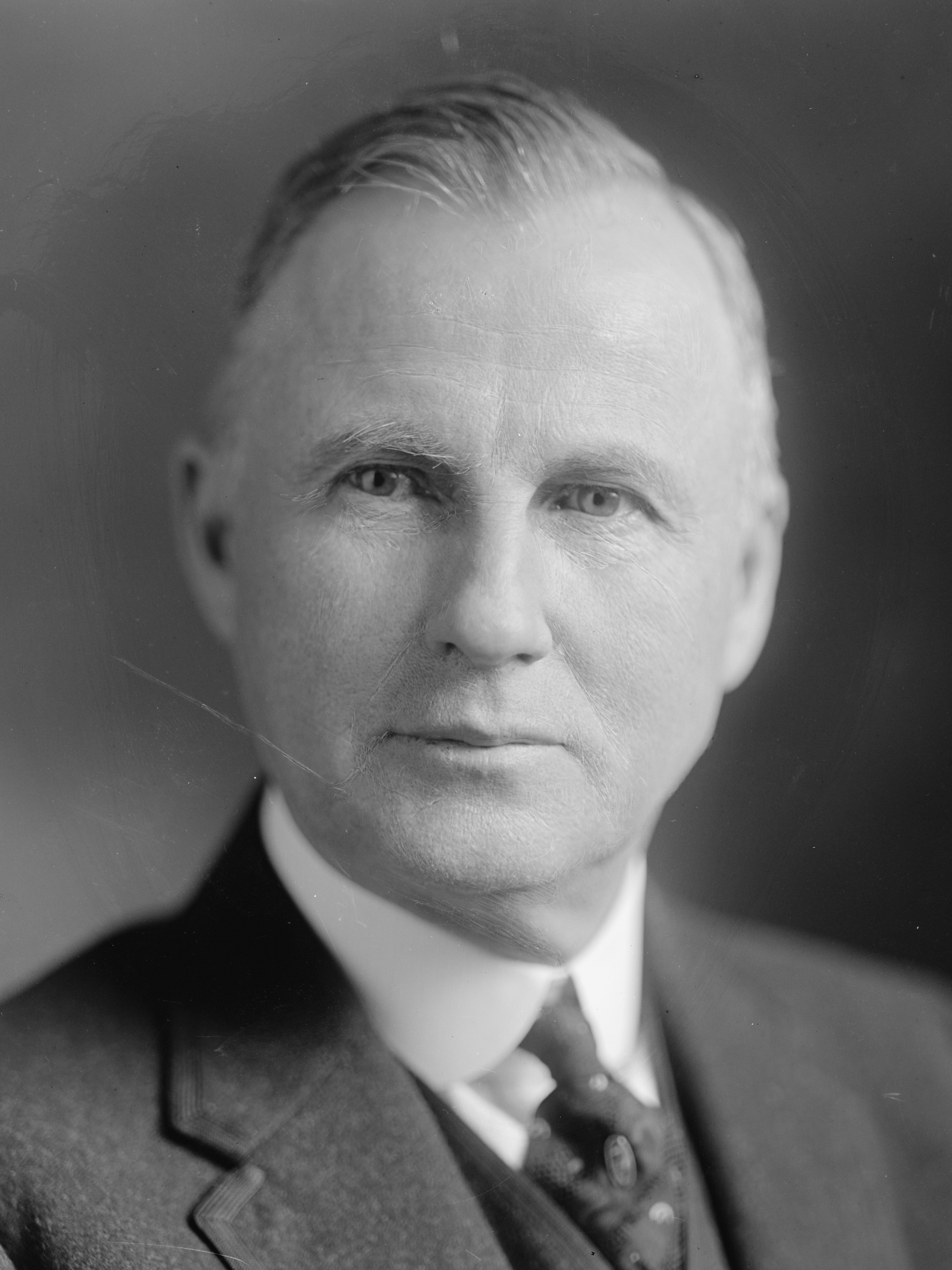

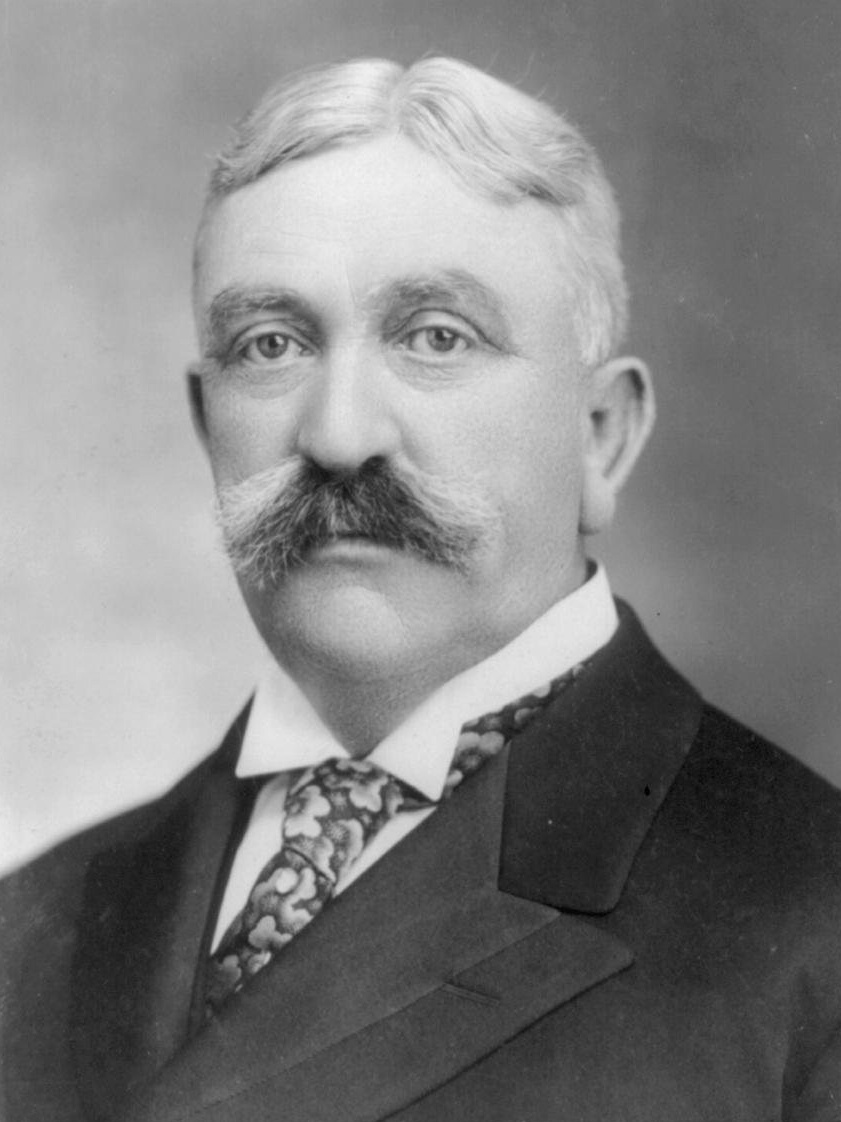
Nominee	Ralph H. Cameron	Marcus A. Smith
Party	Republican	Democratic
Popular vote	35,893	29,169
Percentage	55.17%	44.83%
- County results Cameron: 50–60% 60–70% Smith: 50–60% 60–70%
U.S. senator before election
Marcus A. Smith
Democratic
Elected U.S. Senator
Ralph H. Cameron
Republican

Arizona election
Party	Candidate	Votes	%
Republican	Ralph H. Cameron	35,893	55.17%
Democratic	Marcus A. Smith (incumbent)	29,169	44.83%
Majority		6,724	10.34%
Turnout		65,062	
Republican gain from Democratic			

== Arkansas ==
1920 United States Senate election in Arkansas
- November 2, 1920
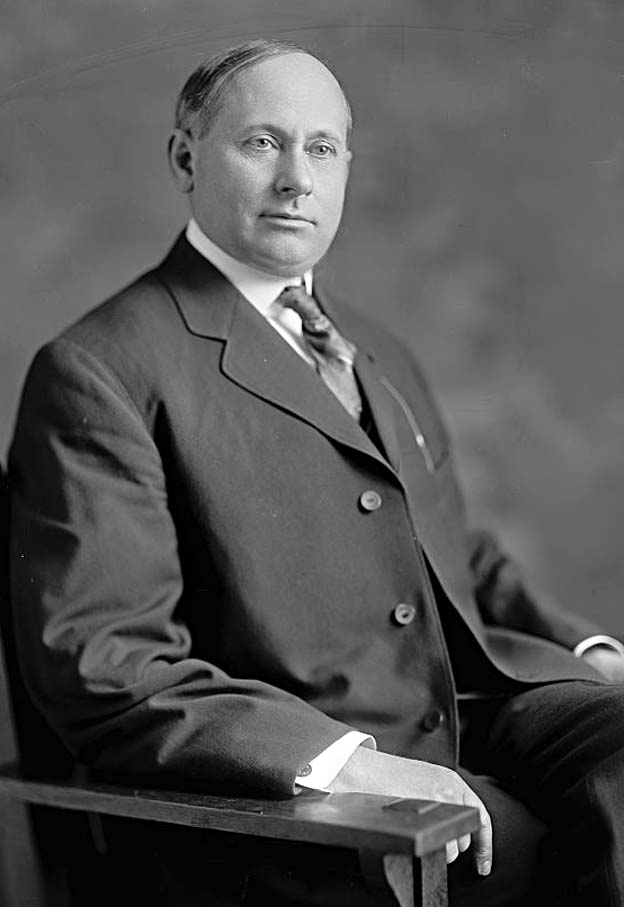

Nominee	Thaddeus H. Caraway	Charles F. Cole
Party	Democratic	Republican
Popular vote	126,477	65,381
Percentage	65.92%	34.08%
- County results Caraway: 50–60% 60–70% 70–80% 80–90% Cole: 50–60% 60–70%
U.S. senator before election
William F. Kirby
Democratic
Elected U.S. Senator
Thaddeus H. Caraway
Democratic

Arkansas election
Party	Candidate	Votes	%
Democratic	Thaddeus H. Caraway	126,477	65.92%
Republican	Charles F. Cole	65,381	34.08%
Majority		61,096	31.84%
Turnout		191,858	
Democratic hold			

== California ==
1920 United States Senate election in California
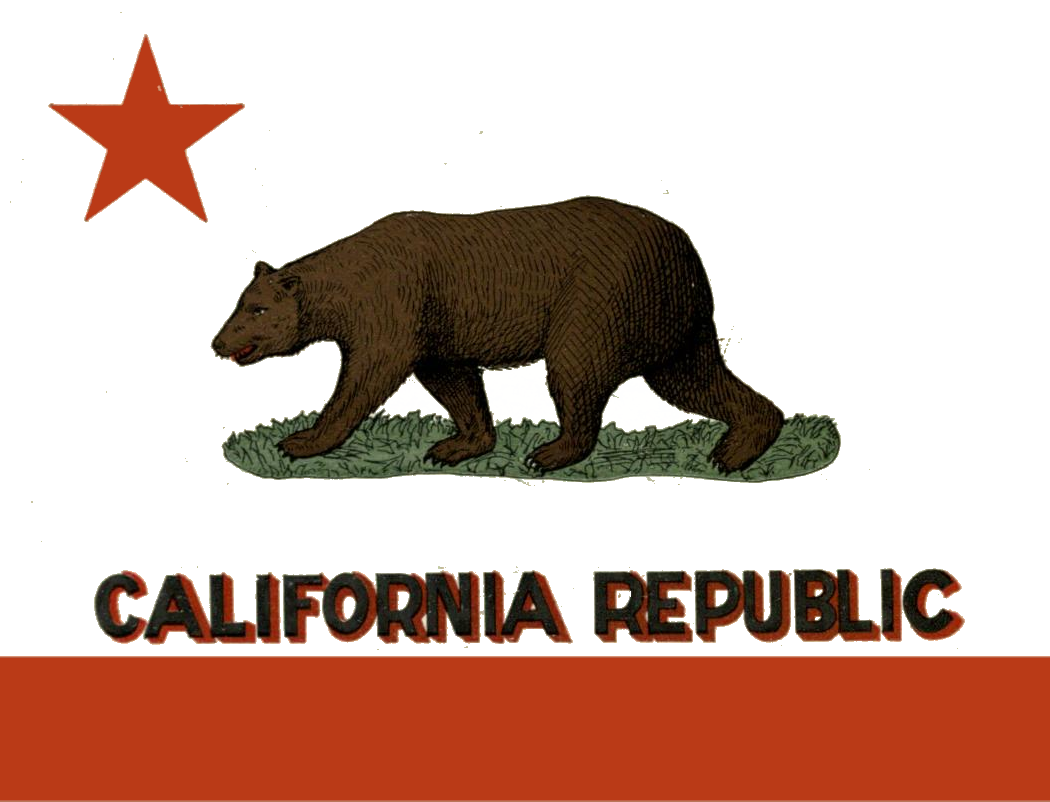
- November 2, 1920
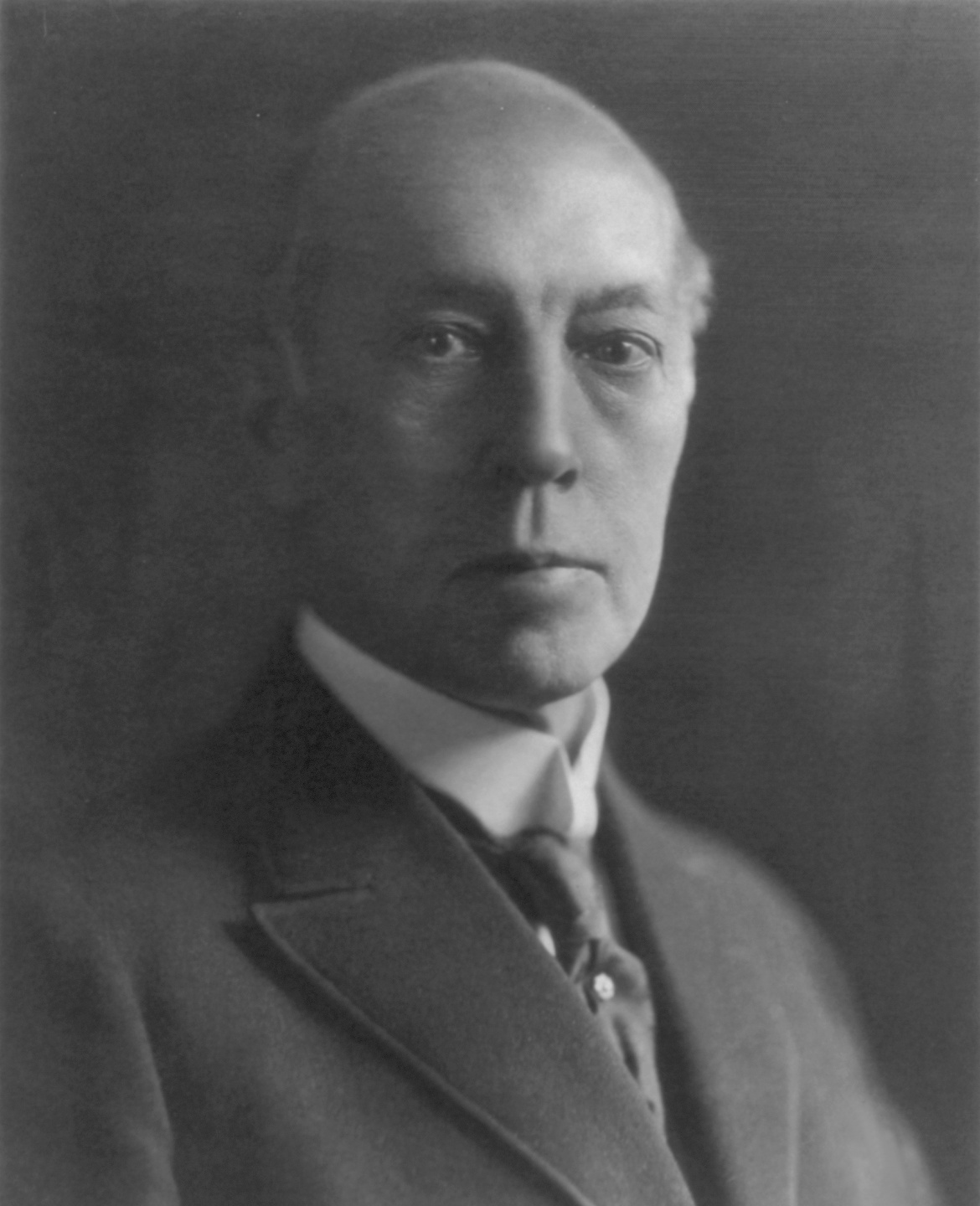

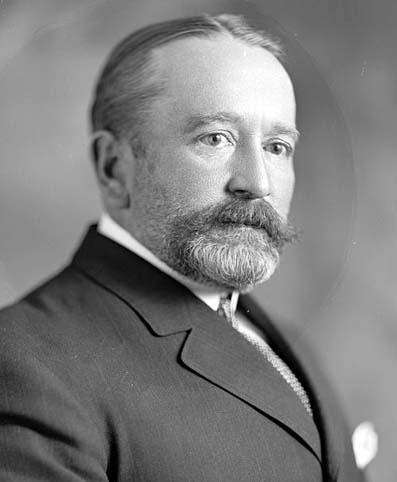

Nominee	Samuel M. Shortridge	James Duval Phelan	James S. Edwards
Party	Republican	Democratic	Prohibition
Popular vote	447,835	371,580	57,768
Percentage	49.01%	40.67%	6.32%
- County results Shortridge: 40–50% 50–60% 60–70% 80–90% Phelan: 40–50% 50–60% 60–70%
U.S. senator before election
James Duval Phelan
Democratic
Elected U.S. Senator
Samuel Morgan Shortridge
Republican

California election
Party	Candidate	Votes	%
Republican	Samuel M. Shortridge	447,835	49.01%
Democratic	James D. Phelan (incumbent)	371,580	40.67%
Prohibition	James S. Edwards	57,768	6.32%
Socialist	Elvina S. Beals	36,545	4.00%
Majority		76,255	8.34%
Turnout		913,728	
Republican gain from Democratic			

== Colorado ==
1920 United States Senate election in Colorado
- November 2, 1920
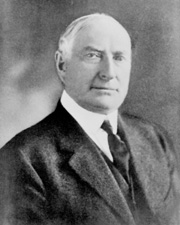
Nominee	Samuel D. Nicholson	Tully Scott
Party	Republican	Democratic
Popular vote	157,577	112,890
Percentage	54.52%	39.31%
- Results by county Nicholson: 40–50% 50–60% 60–70% 70–80% Scott: 40–50%
U.S. senator before election
Charles S. Thomas
Democratic
Elected U.S. Senator
Samuel D. Nicholson
Republican

Colorado election
Party	Candidate	Votes	%
Republican	Samuel D. Nicholson	156,577	54.52%
Democratic	Tully Scott	112,890	39.31%
Farmer–Labor	G. F. Stevens	9,041	3.15%
Independent	Charles S. Thomas (incumbent)	8,665	3.02%
Majority		43,687	15.21%
Turnout		287,173	
Republican hold			

== Connecticut ==
1920 United States Senate election in Connecticut
- November 2, 1920
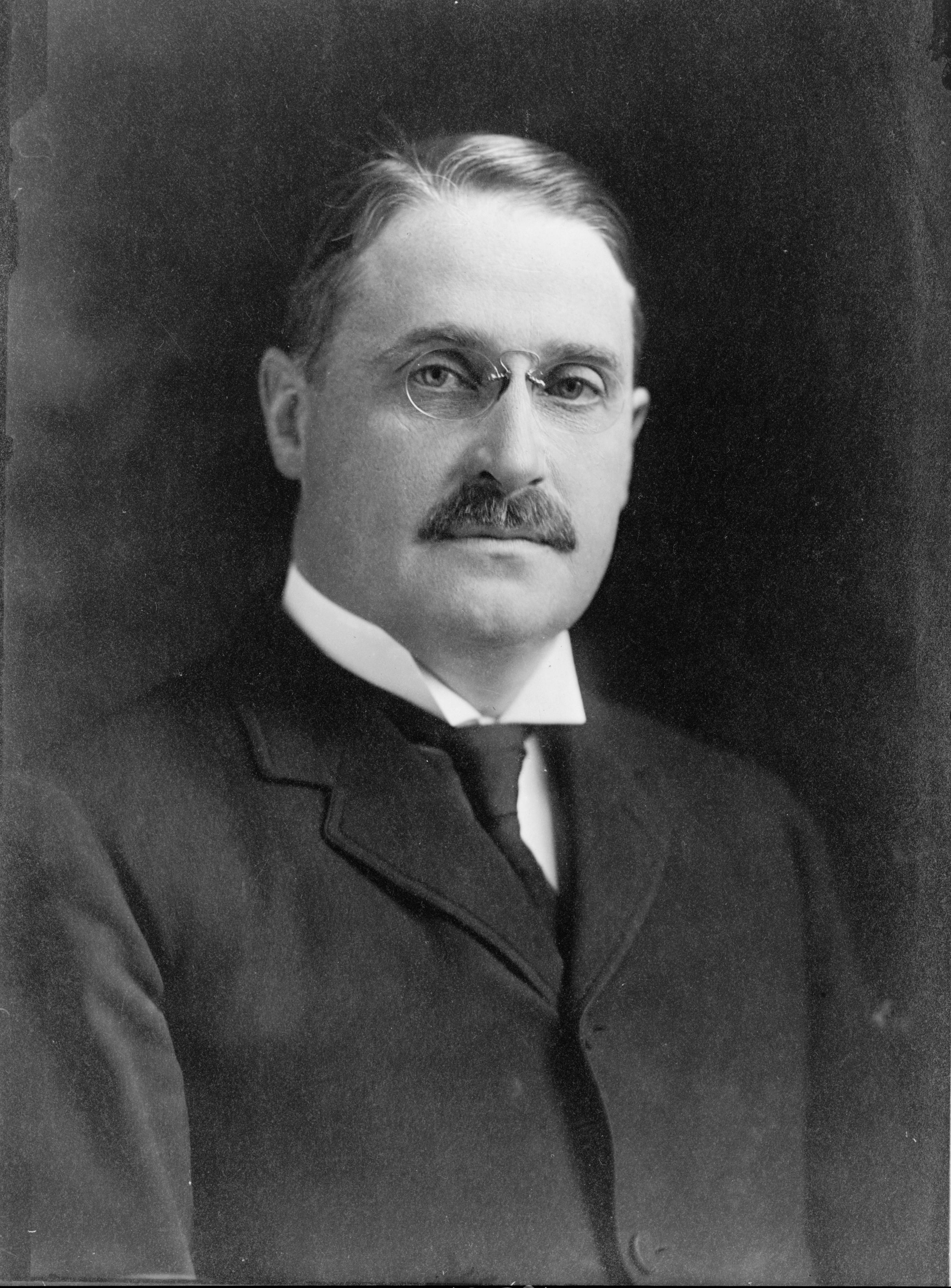

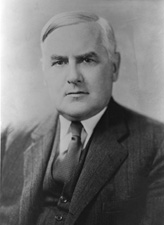
Nominee	Frank B. Brandegee	Augustine Lonergan
Party	Republican	Democratic
Popular vote	216,792	131,824
Percentage	59.36%	36.10%
- Brandegee: 40–50% 50–60% 60–70% 70–80% 80–90% 90–100% Lonergan: 40–50% 50–60% 60–70%
U.S. senator before election
Frank B. Brandegee
Republican
Elected U.S. Senator
Frank B. Brandegee
Republican

Connecticut election
Party	Candidate	Votes	%
Republican	Frank B. Brandegee (incumbent)	216,792	59.36%
Democratic	Augustine Lonergan	131,824	36.10%
Socialist	Martin F. Plunkett	10,118	2.77%
Prohibition	Emil L. G. Hohenthal	2,892	0.79%
Farmer–Labor	Josephine B. Bennett	2,076	0.57%
Socialist Labor	Charles J. Backofen	1,486	0.41%
Majority		84,968	23.26%
Turnout		365,188	
Republican hold			

== Florida ==
1920 United States Senate election in Florida
- November 2, 1920
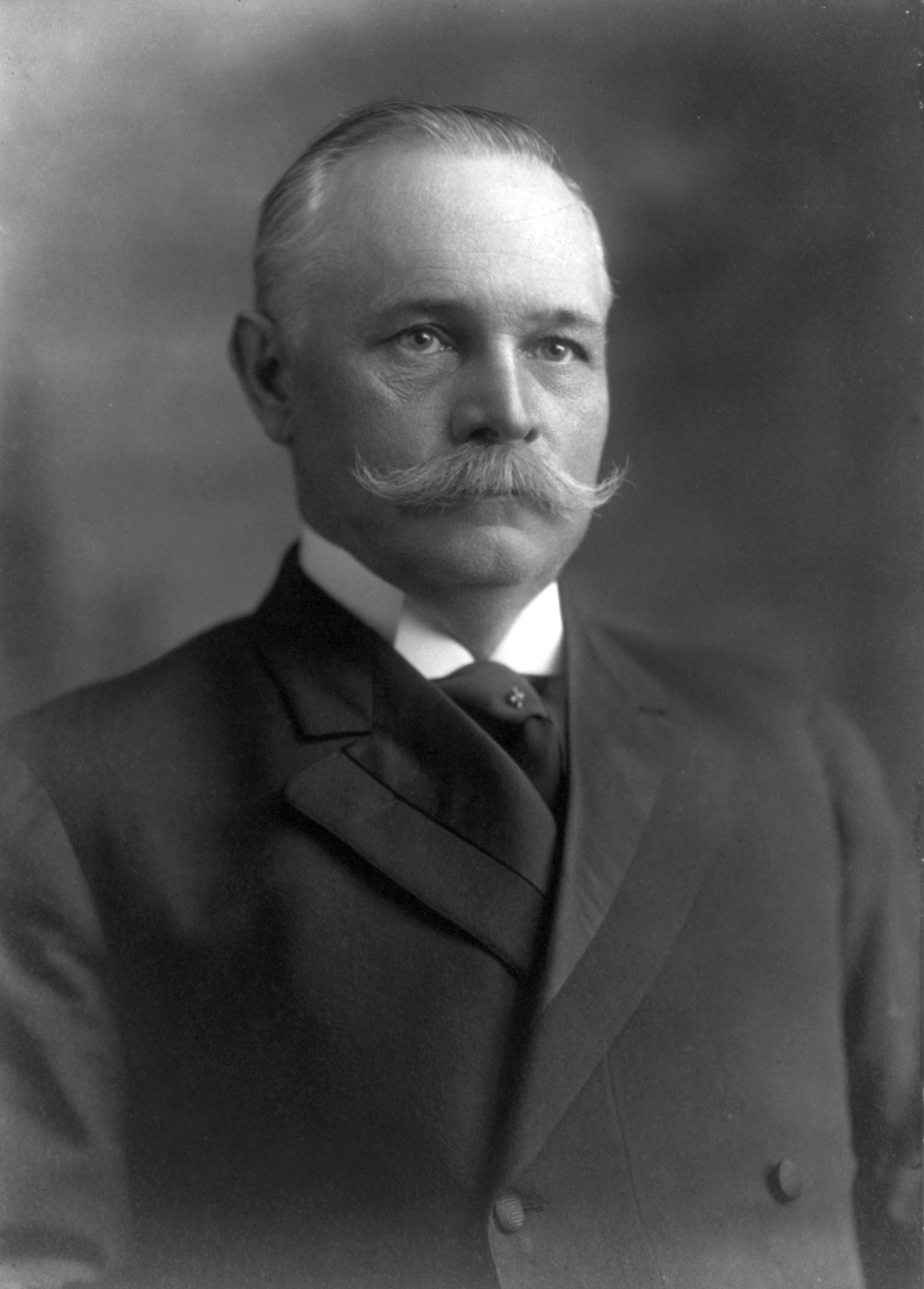

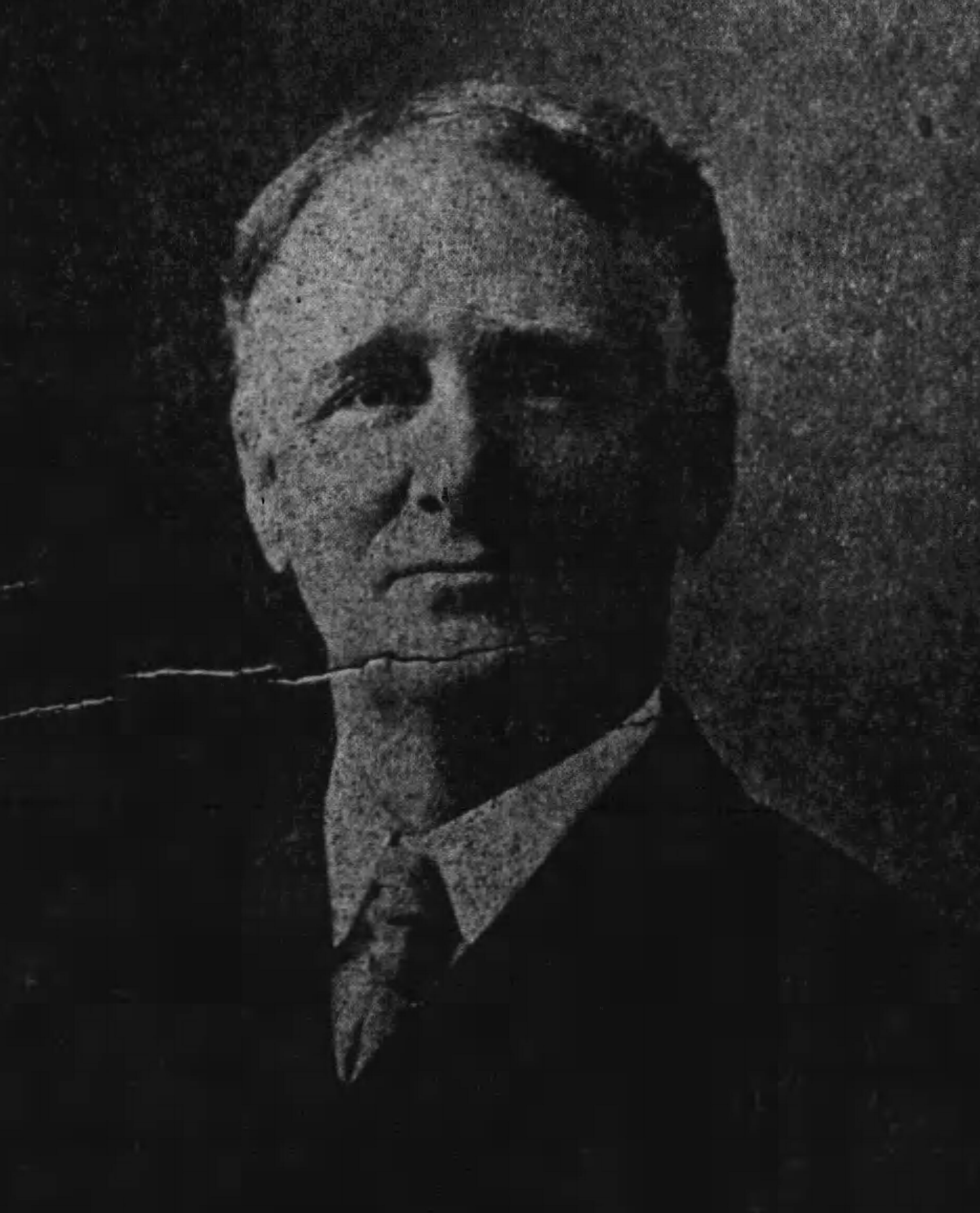
Nominee	Duncan U. Fletcher	John Moses Cheney
Party	Democratic	Republican
Popular vote	98,957	37,065
Percentage	69.50%	26.03%
- County results Fletcher: 50–60% 60–70% 70–80% 80–90% 90–100%
U.S. senator before election
Duncan U. Fletcher
Democratic
Elected U.S. Senator
Duncan U. Fletcher
Democratic

Florida election
Party	Candidate	Votes	%
Democratic	Duncan U. Fletcher (incumbent)	98,957	69.50%
Republican	John Moses Cheney	37,065	26.03%
Socialist	M. J. Martin	3,525	2.48%
White Republican	G. A. Klock	2,847	2.00%
Majority		61,892	43.47%
Turnout		142,394	
Democratic hold			

== Georgia ==
1920 United States Senate election in Georgia
- November 2, 1920
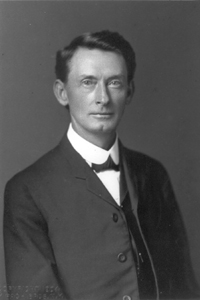

Nominee	Thomas E. Watson	Harry S. Edwards
Party	Democratic	Independent
Popular vote	124,630	6,700
Percentage	94.50%	5.10%
U.S. senator before election
M. Hoke Smith
Democratic
Elected U.S. Senator
Thomas E. Watson
Democratic

Georgia election
Party	Candidate	Votes	%
Democratic	Thomas E. Watson	124,630	94.90%
Pro-League Independent	Harry S. Edwards	6,700	5.10%
Majority		117930	89.80%
Turnout		131330	
Democratic hold			

== Idaho ==
1920 United States Senate election in Idaho
- November 2, 1920
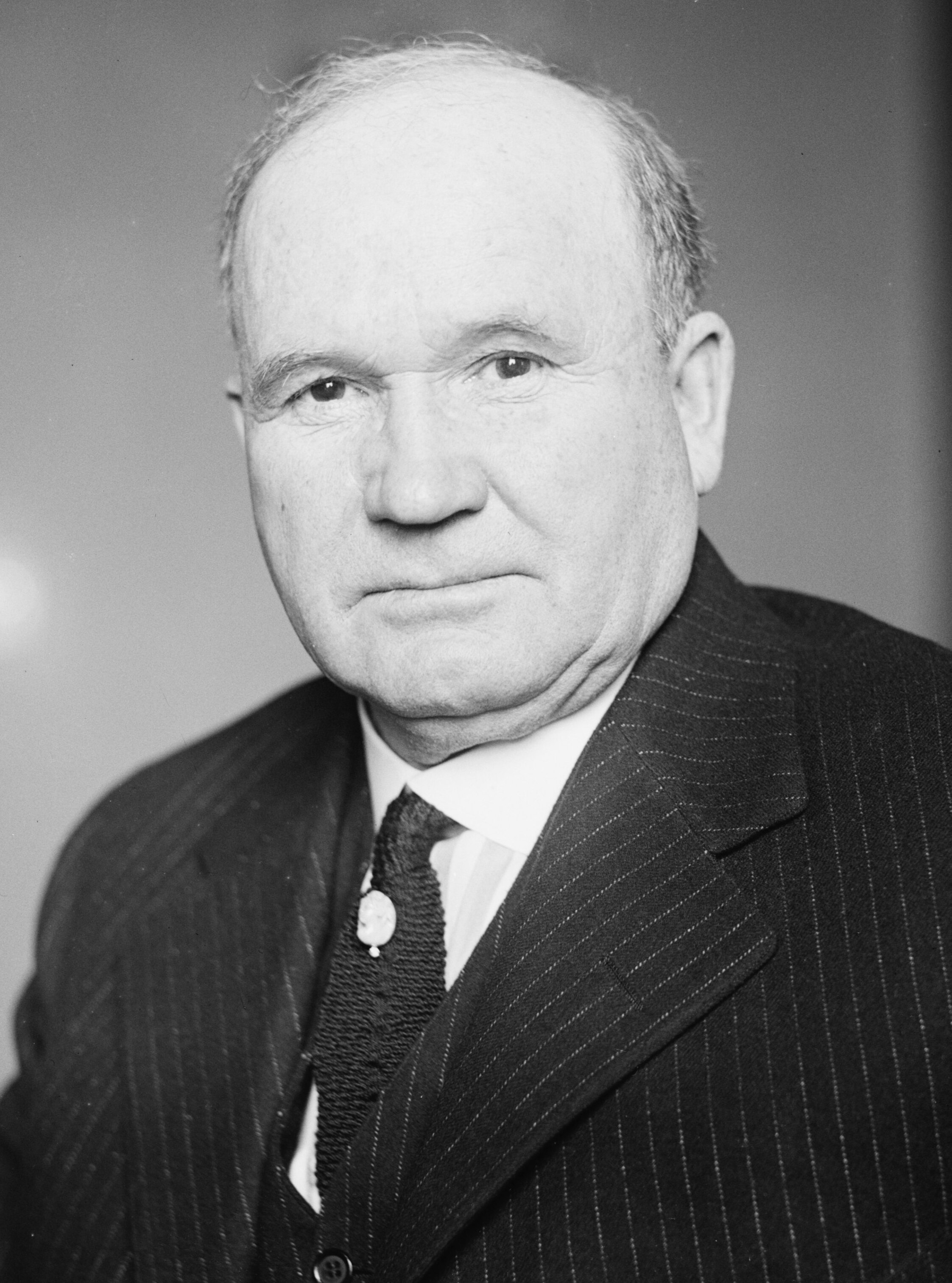

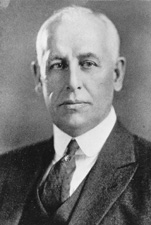
Nominee	Frank R. Gooding	John F. Nugent
Party	Republican	Democratic
Popular vote	75,985	64,513
Percentage	54.08%	45.92%
- County results Gooding: 50–60% 60–70% Nugent: 50–60% 60–70%
U.S. senator before election
John F. Nugent
Democratic
Elected U.S. Senator
Frank R. Gooding
Republican

Idaho election
Party	Candidate	Votes	%
Republican	Frank R. Gooding	75,985	54.08%
Democratic	John F. Nugent (incumbent)	64,513	45.92%
Majority		11,472	8.16%
Turnout		140,498	
Republican gain from Democratic			

== Illinois ==
1920 United States Senate election in Illinois
- November 2, 1920
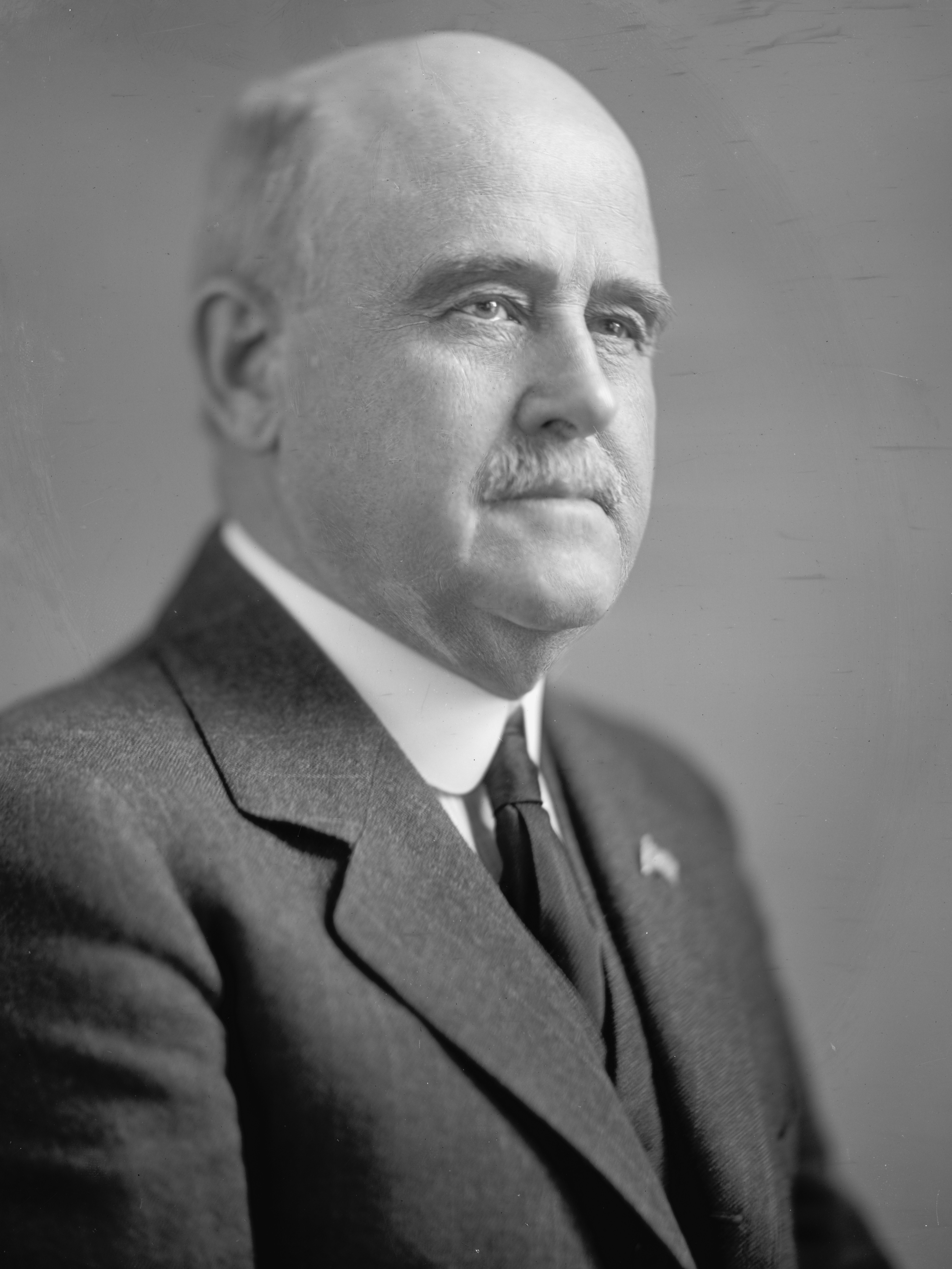

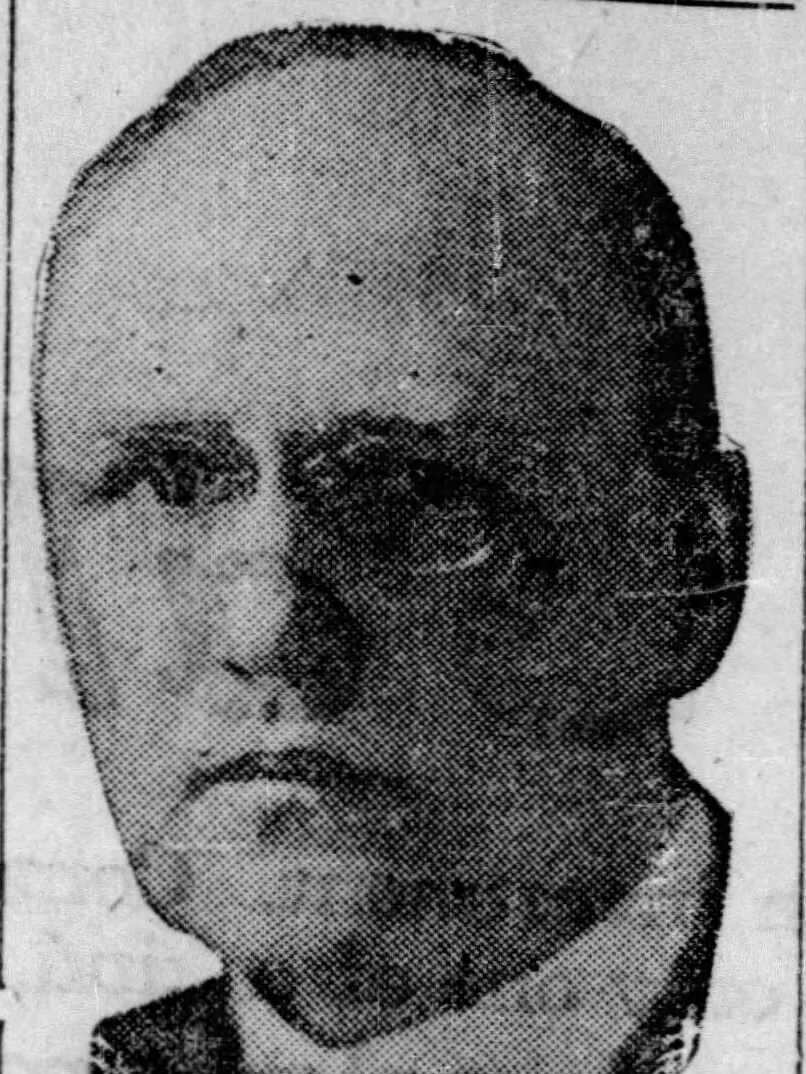
Nominee	William B. McKinley	Peter A. Waller
Party	Republican	Democratic
Popular vote	1,381,384	554,372
Percentage	66.83%	26.82%
- Results by county McKinley: 40–50% 50–60% 60–70% 70–80% 80–90% Waller: 40–50% 50–60%
U.S. senator before election
Lawrence Yates Sherman
Republican
Elected U.S. senator
William B. McKinley
Republican

Illinois election
Party	Candidate	Votes	%
Republican	William B. McKinley	1,381,384	66.83%
Democratic	Peter A. Waller	554,372	26.82%
Socialist	Gustave T. Fraenckel	66,463	3.22%
Farmer–Labor	John Fitzpatrick	50,749	2.46%
Prohibition	Frank B. Vennum	10,186	0.49%
Socialist Labor	Joseph B. Moody	3,107	0.15%
Single Tax	George Dodd Carrington Jr.	784	0.04%
Majority		827,012	40.01%
Turnout		2,067,045	
Republican hold			

== Indiana ==
1920 United States Senate election in Indiana
- November 2, 1920
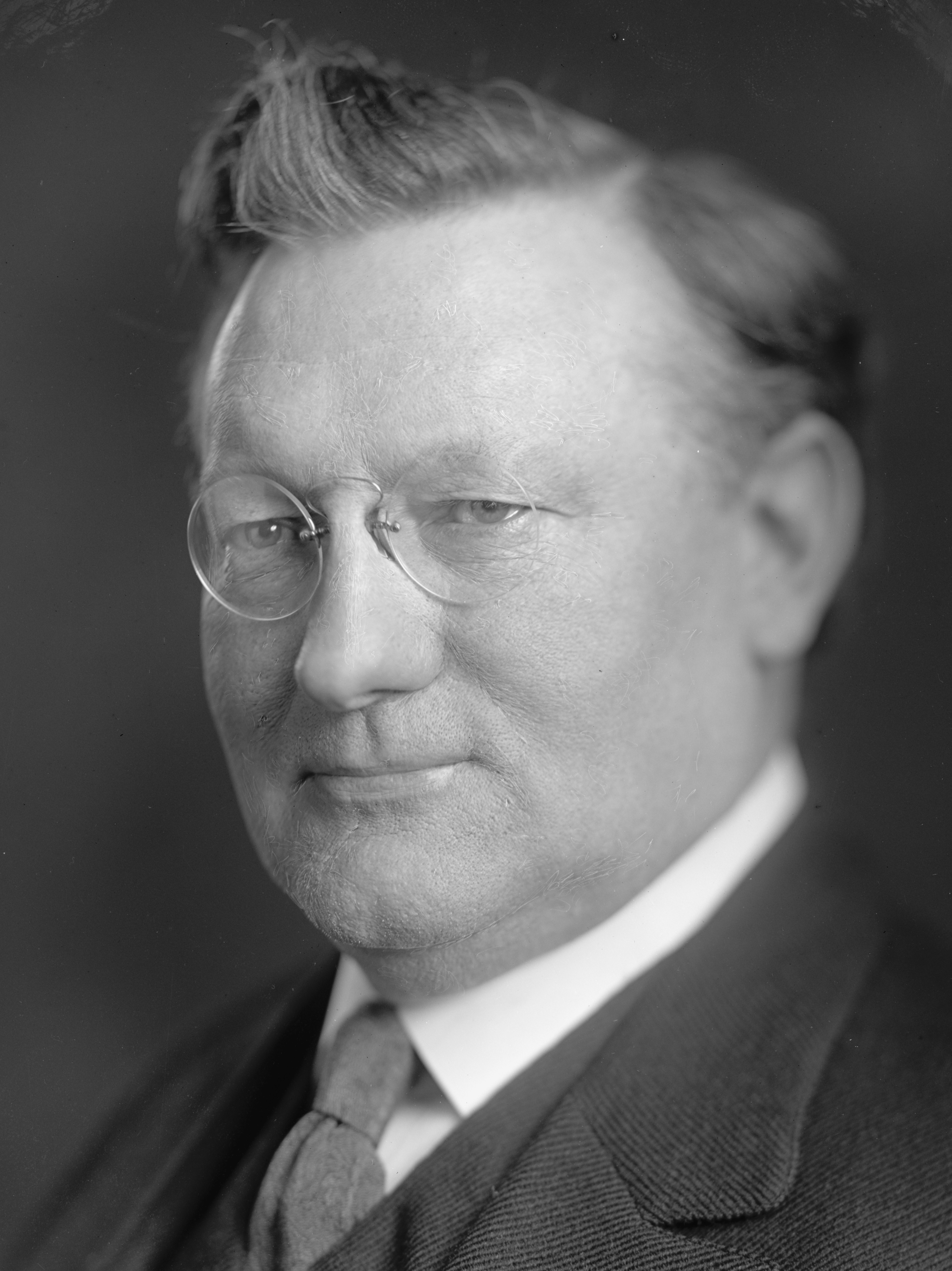

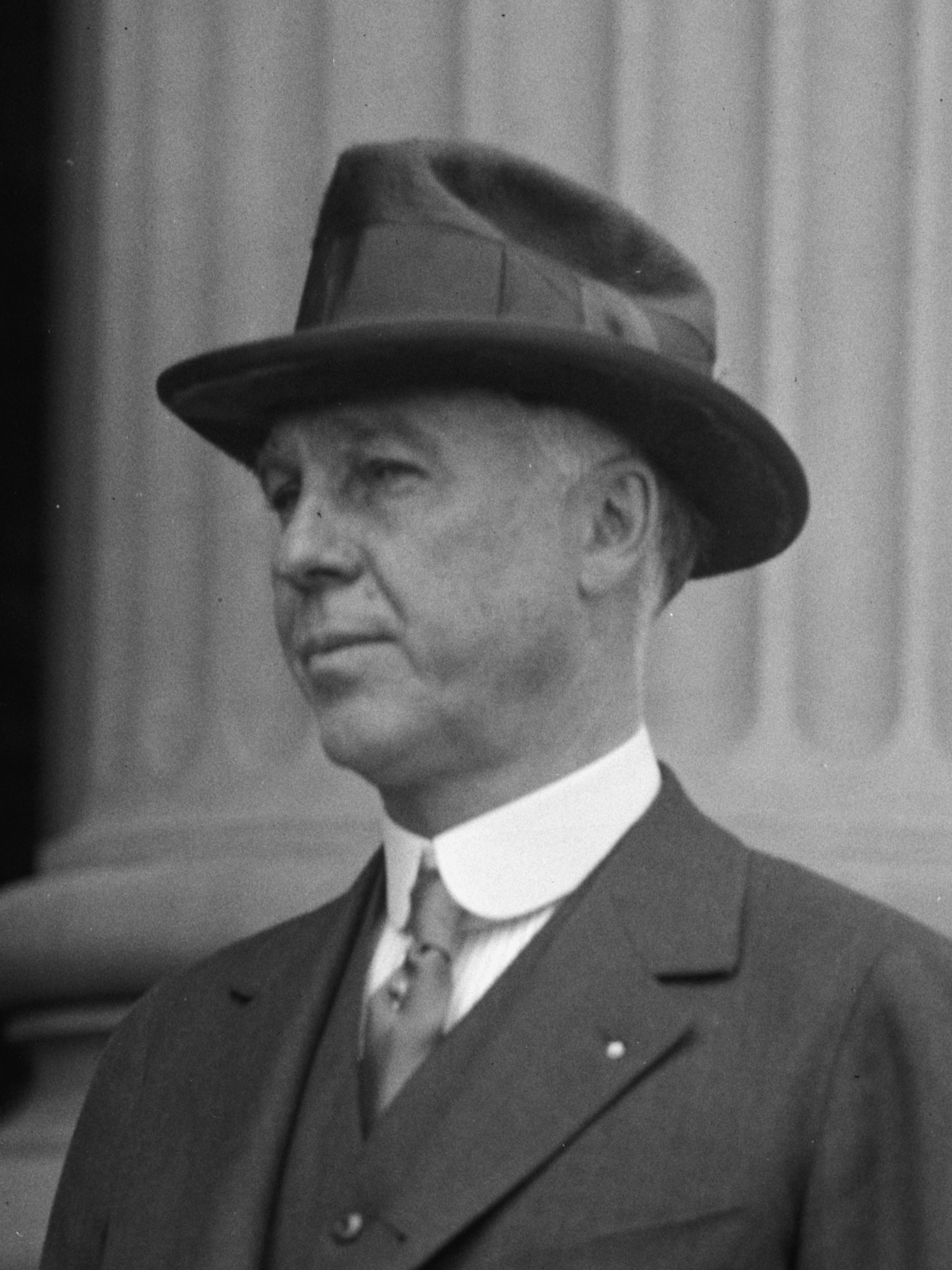
Nominee	James E. Watson	Thomas Taggart
Party	Republican	Democratic
Popular vote	681,851	514,191
Percentage	54.57%	41.15%
- County results Watson: 40–50% 50–60% 60–70% 70–80% Taggart: 40–50% 50–60% 60–70%
U.S. senator before election
James E. Watson
Republican
Elected U.S. Senator
James E. Watson
Republican

Indiana election
Party	Candidate	Votes	%
Republican	James Eli Watson (incumbent)	681,851	54.57%
Democratic	Thomas Taggart	514,191	41.15%
Socialist	Francis M. Wampler	23,395	1.87%
Farmer–Labor	Francis J. Dillon	16,804	1.34%
Prohibition	Culla Bayhinger	13,323	1.07%
Majority		167,660	13.42%
Turnout		1,249,564	
Republican hold			

== Iowa ==
1920 United States Senate election in Iowa
- November 2, 1920
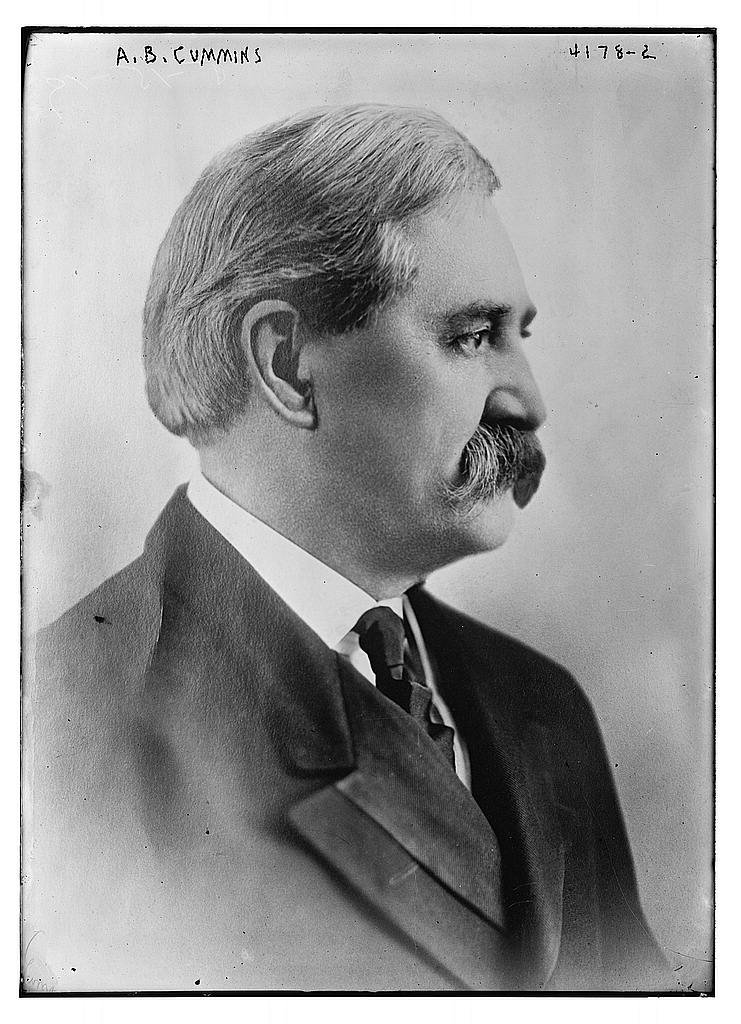

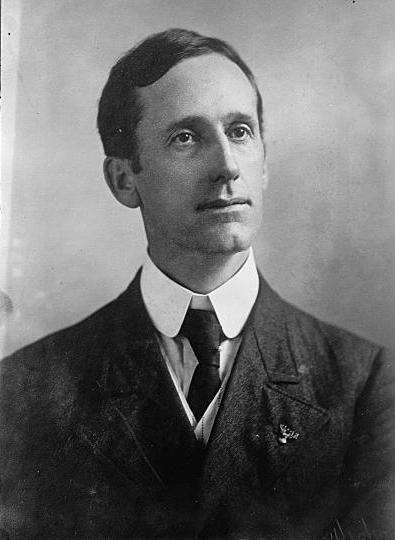
Nominee	Albert B. Cummins	Claude R. Porter
Party	Republican	Democratic
Popular vote	528,499	322,015
Percentage	61.42%	37.42%
- County results Cummins: 50–60% 60–70% 70–80% Porter: 50–60%
U.S. senator before election
Albert B. Cummins
Republican
Elected U.S. Senator
Albert B. Cummins
Republican

Iowa election
Party	Candidate	Votes	%
Republican	Albert B. Cummins (incumbent)	528,499	61.42%
Democratic	Claude R. Porter	322,015	37.42%
Farmer–Labor	H. W. Cowles	9,020	1.05%
Socialist Labor	Arthur S. Dowler	933	0.11%
Majority		206,484	24.00%
Turnout		860,467	
Republican hold			

== Kansas ==
1920 United States Senate election in Kansas
- November 2, 1920
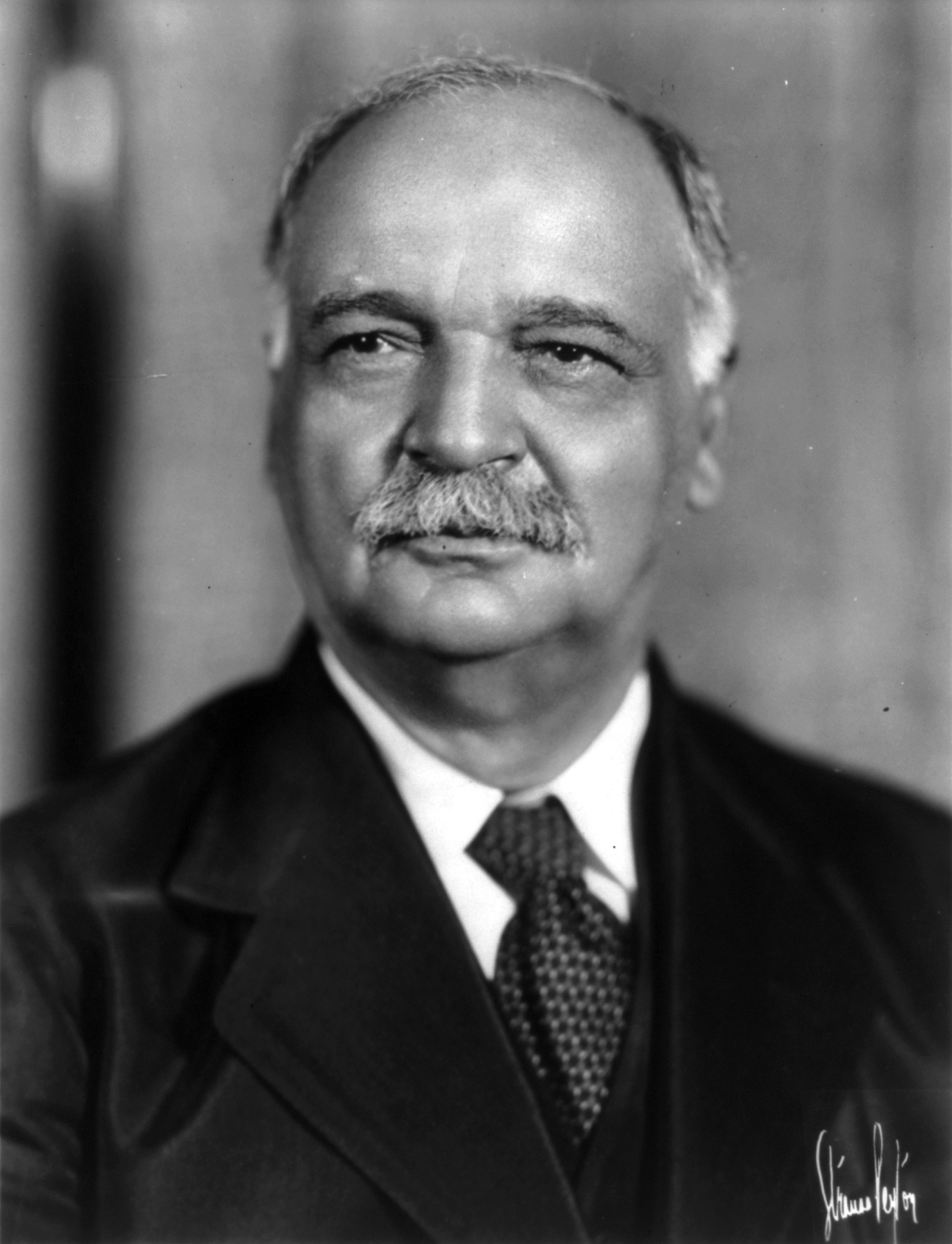

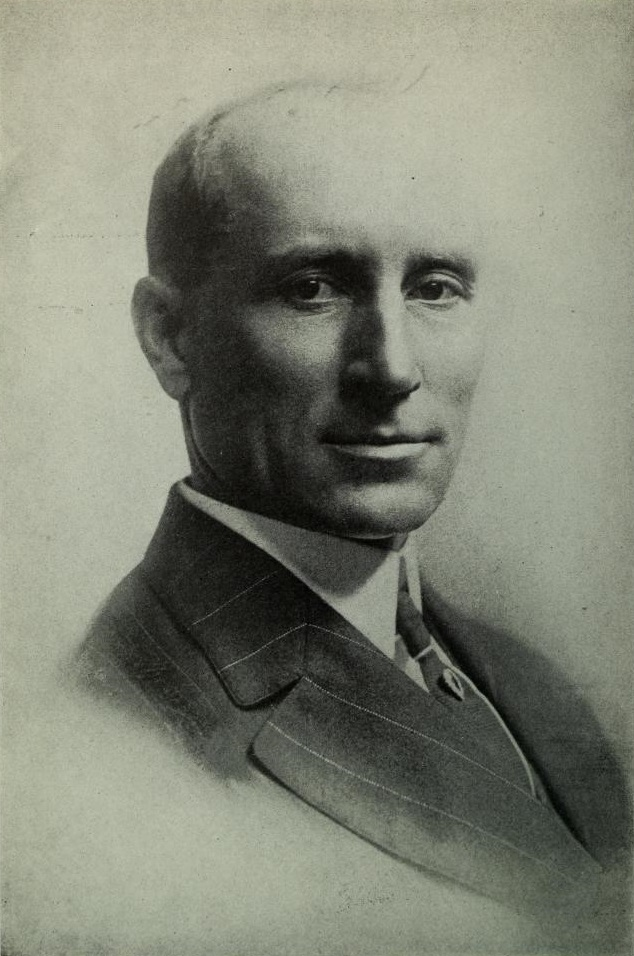
Nominee	Charles Curtis	George H. Hodges
Party	Republican	Democratic
Popular vote	327,072	170,443
Percentage	64.01%	33.36%
- County results Curtis: 40–50% 50–60% 60–70% 70–80%
[[List of United States senators from {{{country}}}|U.S. senator]] before election
Charles Curtis
Republican
Elected U.S. Senator
Charles Curtis
Republican

Kansas election
Party	Candidate	Votes	%
Republican	Charles Curtis (incumbent)	327,072	64.01%
Democratic	George H. Hodges	170,443	33.36%
Socialist	Dan Beedy	13,417	2.63%
Majority		156,629	30.65%
Turnout		510,932	
Republican hold			

== Kentucky ==
1920 United States Senate election in Kentucky
- November 2, 1920
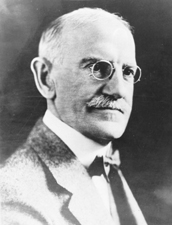

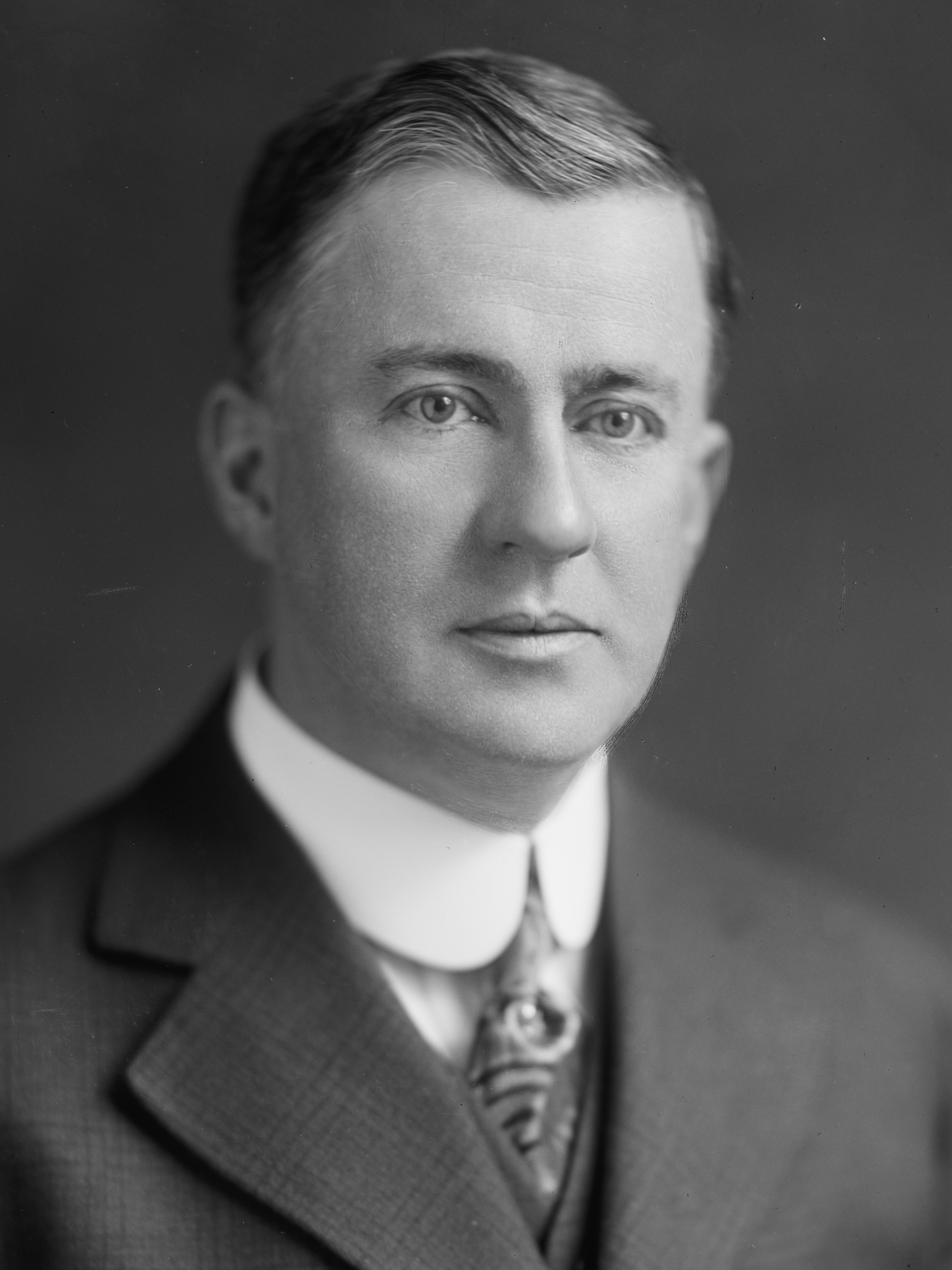
Nominee	Richard P. Ernst	J. C. W. Beckham
Party	Republican	Democratic
Popular vote	454,226	449,244
Percentage	50.28%	49.72%
- County results Ernst: 50–60% 60–70% 70–80% 80–90% >90% Beckham: 50–60% 60–70% 70–80% 80–90%
U.S. senator before election
J. C. W. Beckham
Democratic
Elected U.S. Senator
Richard P. Ernst
Republican

Kentucky election
Party	Candidate	Votes	%
Republican	Richard P. Ernst	454,226	50.28%
Democratic	J. C. W. Beckham (incumbent)	449,244	49.72%
Majority		4,982	0.56%
Turnout		903,470	
Republican gain from Democratic			

== Louisiana ==
1920 United States Senate Election in Louisiana Democratic primary
- September 14, 1920
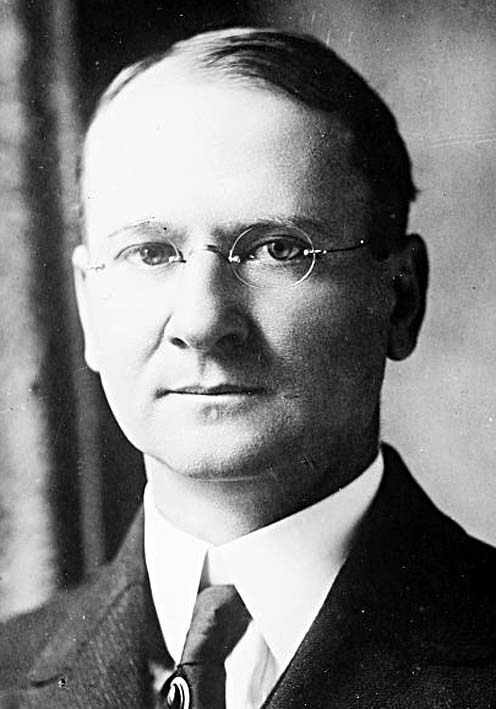

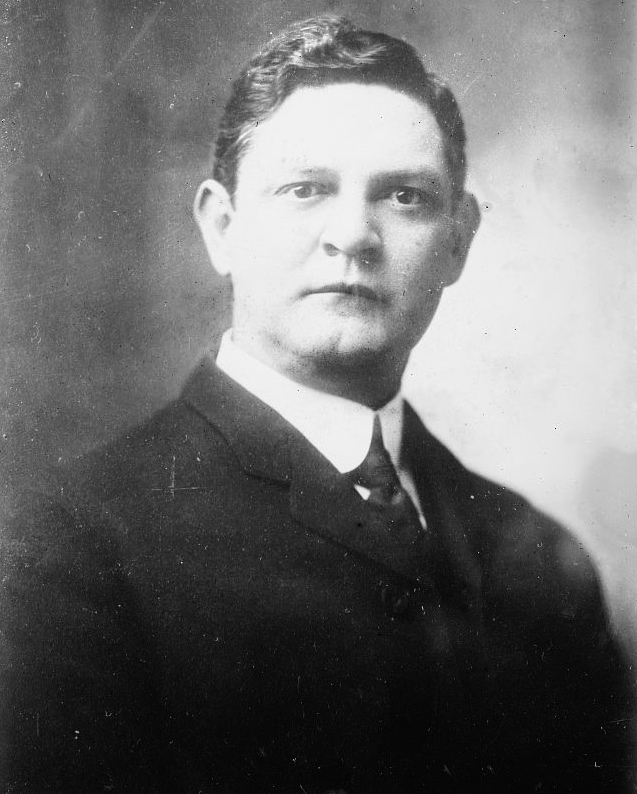

Nominee	Edwin Broussard	Jared Sanders	Donelson Caffery III
Party	Democratic	Democratic	Democratic
Popular vote	49,718	43,425	15,563
Percentage	45.74%	39.95%	14.32%
U.S. senator before election
Edward J. Gay
Democratic
Elected U.S. Senator
Edwin S. Broussard
Democratic

1920 United States Senate Democratic primary
Party	Candidate	Votes	%
Democratic	Edwin S. Broussard	49,718	45.74%
Democratic	Jared Y. Sanders Sr.	43,425	39.95%
Democratic	Donelson Caffery III	15,563	14.32%
Total votes		108,706	100.00%

Louisiana election
Party	Candidate	Votes	%
Democratic	Edwin S. Broussard	94,944	100.00%
Democratic hold			

== Maryland ==
1920 United States Senate election in Maryland
- November 2, 1920
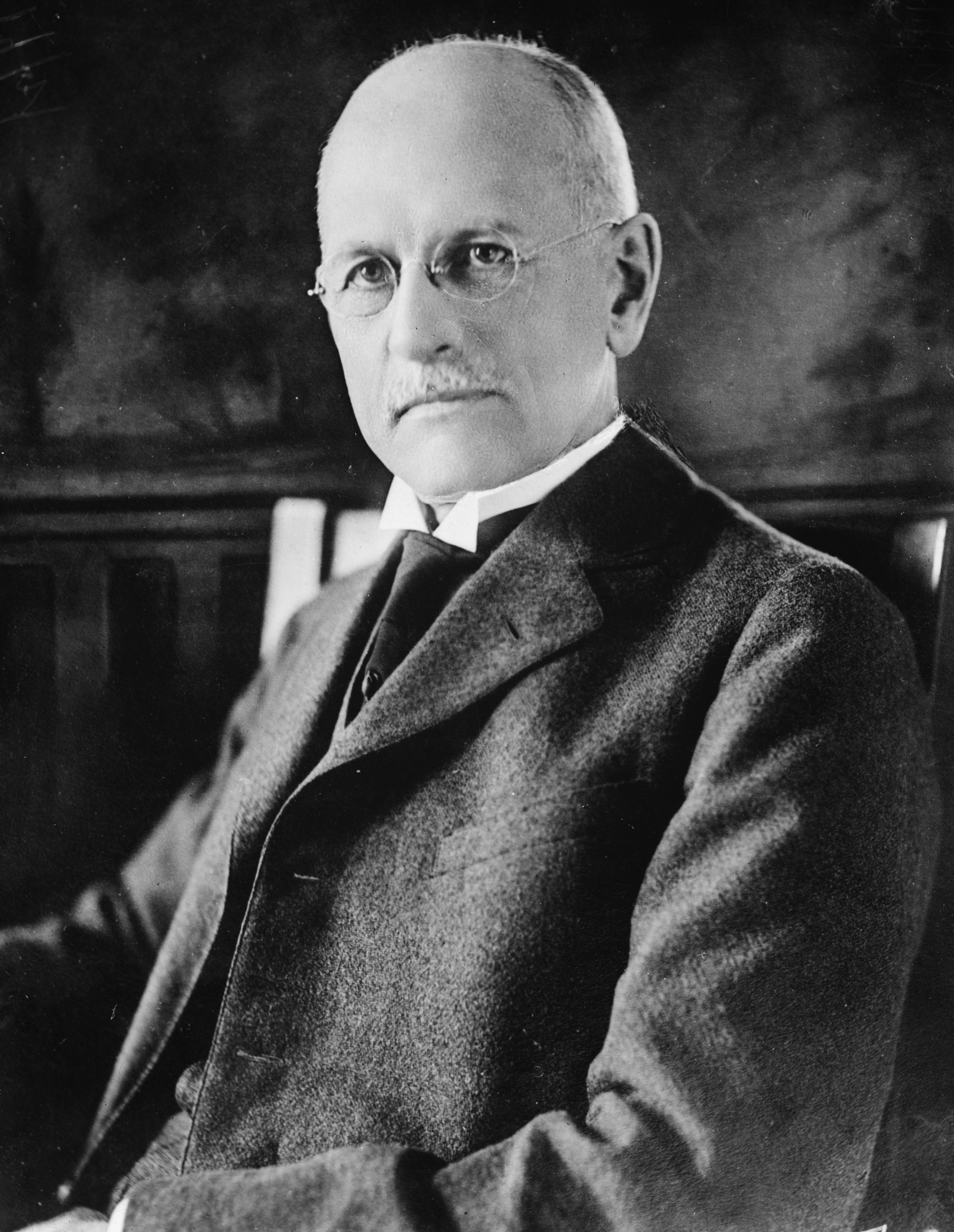

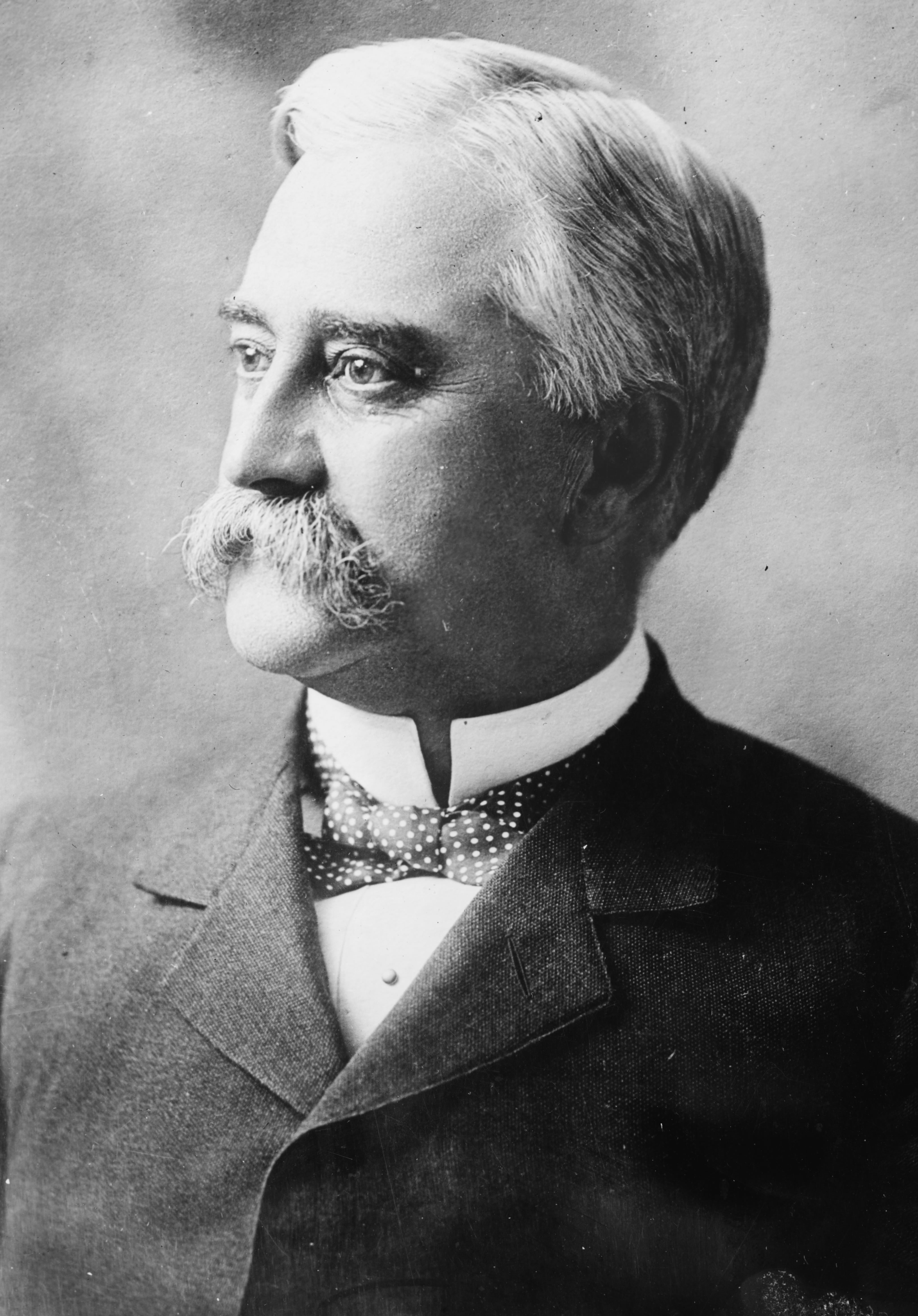

Nominee	Ovington Weller	John Walter Smith	George Iverson Jr.
Party	Republican	Democratic	Independent
Popular vote	184,999	169,200	21,345
Percentage	47.29%	43.25%	5.46%
- County results Weller: 40–50% 50–60% 60–70% Smith: 40–50% 50–60% 60–70%
U.S. senator before election
John Walter Smith
Democratic
Elected U.S. Senator
Ovington Weller
Republican

Maryland election
Party	Candidate	Votes	%
Republican	Ovington Weller	184,999	47.29%
Democratic	John Walter Smith (incumbent)	169,200	43.25%
Independent	G. D. Iverson Jr.	21,345	5.46%
Socialist	William A. Toole	6,559	1.68%
Independent	William A. Hawkins	6,538	1.67%
Labor	Frank N. H. Lang	2,569	0.66%
Majority		15,799	4.04%
Turnout		391,210	
Republican gain from Democratic			

== Missouri ==
1920 United States Senate election in Missouri
- November 2, 1920
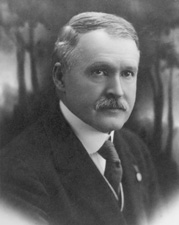

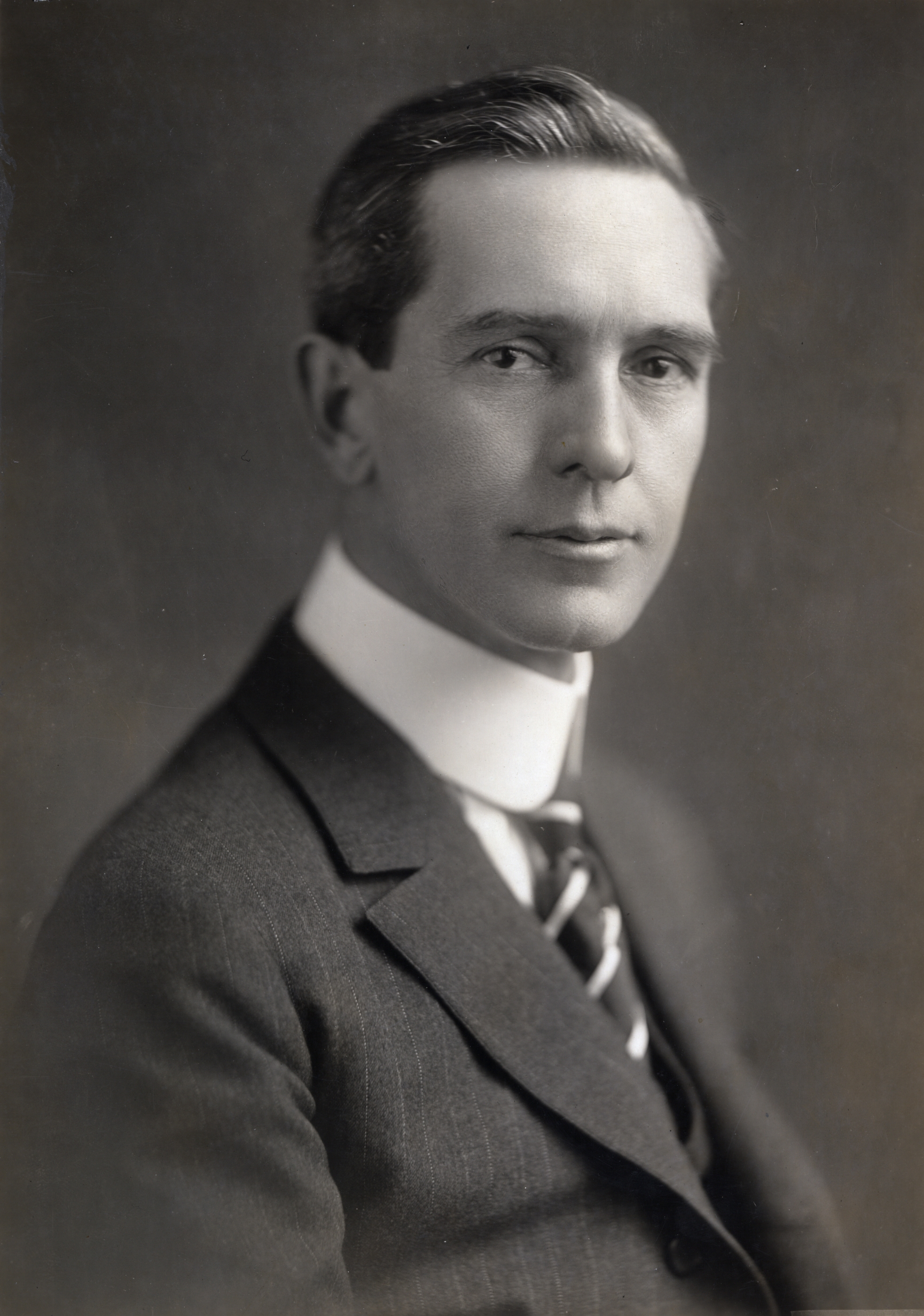
Nominee	Selden P. Spencer	Breckinridge Long
Party	Republican	Democratic
Popular vote	711,161	589,498
Percentage	53.65%	44.47%
- County results Spencer: 40–50% 50–60% 60–70% 70–80% 80–90% Long: 40–50% 50–60% 60–70% 70–80% 80–90%
U.S. senator before election
Selden P. Spencer
Republican
Elected U.S. senator
Selden P. Spencer
Republican

Missouri election
Party	Candidate	Votes	%
Republican	Selden P. Spencer (incumbent)	711,161	53.65%
Democratic	Breckinridge Long	589,498	44.47%
Socialist	Elias F. Hodges	20,002	1.51%
Farmer–Worker	W. J. Mallett	3,158	0.24%
Socialist Labor	Andrew Trudell	1,675	0.13%
Majority		121,663	9.18%
Turnout		1,325,494	
Republican hold			

== Nevada ==
1920 United States Senate election in Nevada
- November 2, 1920
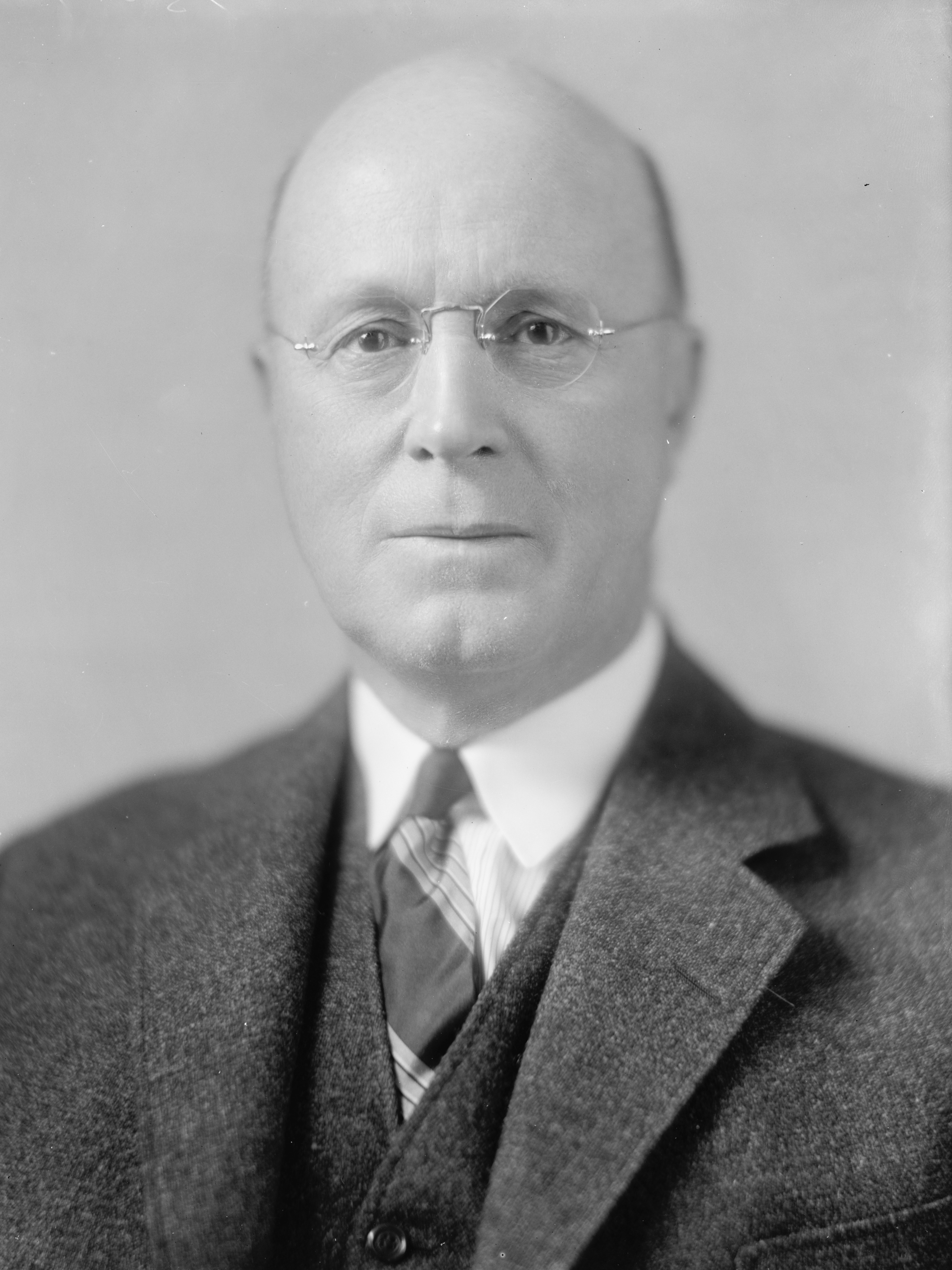

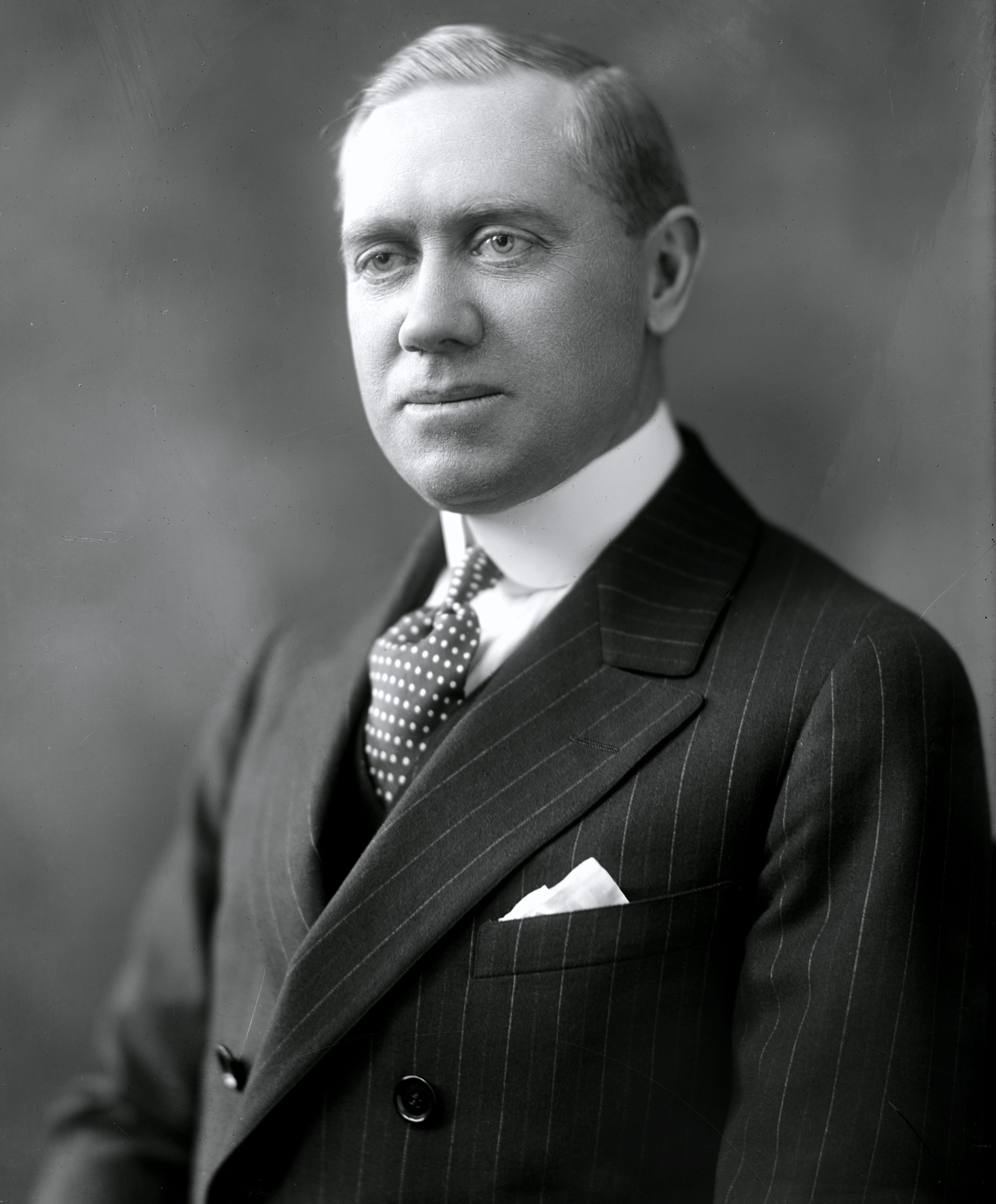

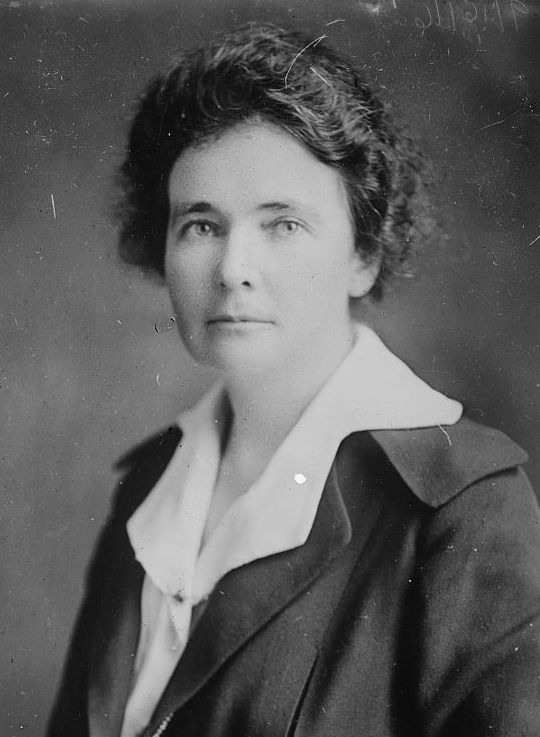
Nominee	Tasker Oddie	Charles Henderson	Anne Henrietta Martin
Party	Republican	Democratic	Independent
Popular vote	11,550	10,402	4,981
Percentage	42.11%	37.93%	18.16%
- County results Oddie: 30–40% 40–50% 50–60% 60–70% Henderson: 30–40% 40–50% 50–60%
U.S. senator before election
Charles Henderson
Democratic
Elected U.S. Senator
Tasker Oddie
Republican

Nevada election
Party	Candidate	Votes	%
Republican	Tasker Oddie	11,550	42.11%
Democratic	Charles B. Henderson (incumbent)	10,402	37.93%
Independent	Anne Henrietta Martin	4,981	18.16%
Socialist	James Jepson	494	1.80%
Majority		1148	5.18%
Turnout		27,427	
Republican gain from Democratic			

== New Hampshire ==
1920 United States Senate election in New Hampshire
- November 2, 1920
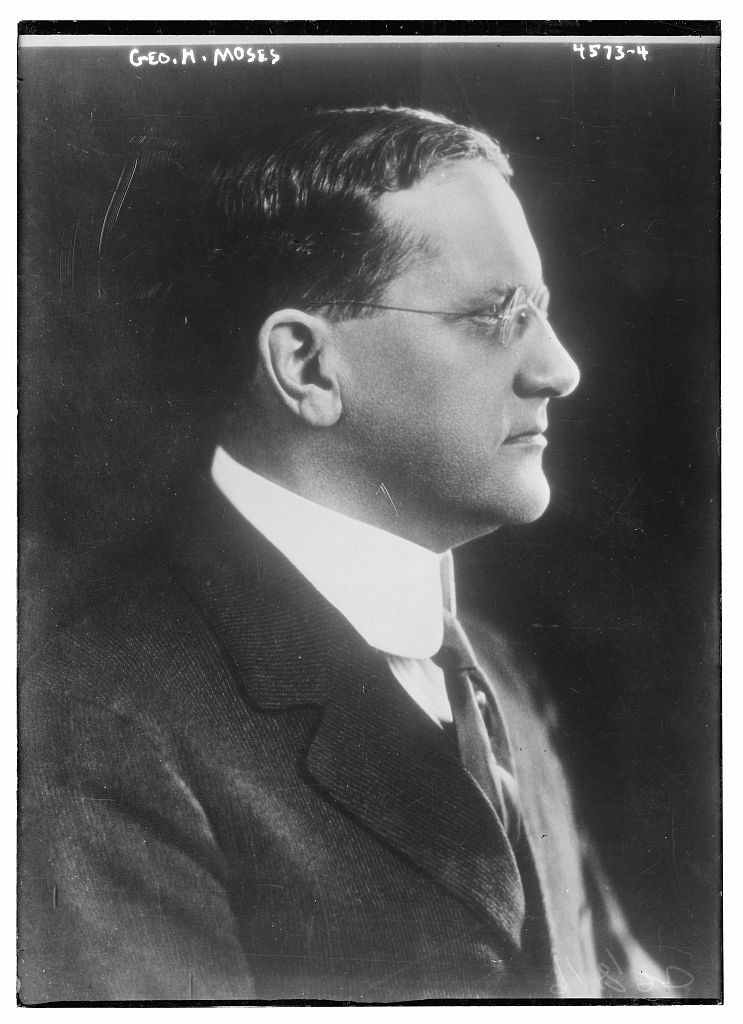

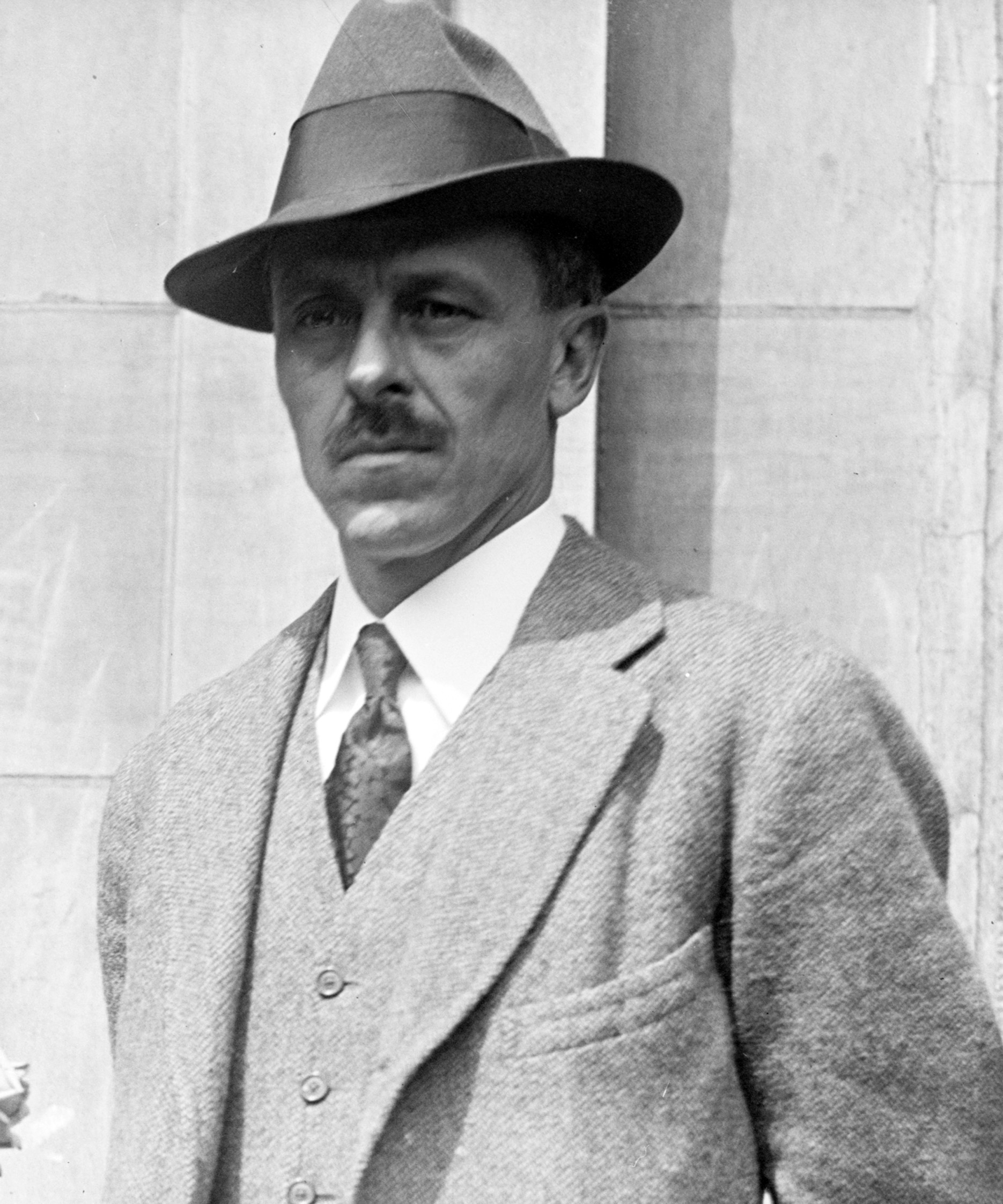
Nominee	George H. Moses	Raymond Bartlett Stevens
Party	Republican	Democratic
Popular vote	90,173	65,038
Percentage	57.72%	41.63%
- Moses: 50–60% 60–70% 70–80% 80–90% 90-100% Stevens: 50–60% 60–70% Tie: 40–50% 50%
U.S. senator before election
George H. Moses
Republican
Elected U.S. Senator
George H. Moses
Republican

New Hampshire election
Party	Candidate	Votes	%
Republican	George H. Moses (incumbent)	90,173	57.72%
Democratic	Raymond Bartlett Stevens	65,038	41.63%
Socialist	William H. Wilkins	1,004	0.64%
Majority		25135	16.09%
Turnout		156,215	
Republican hold			

== New York ==
1920 United States Senate election in New York
- November 2, 1920
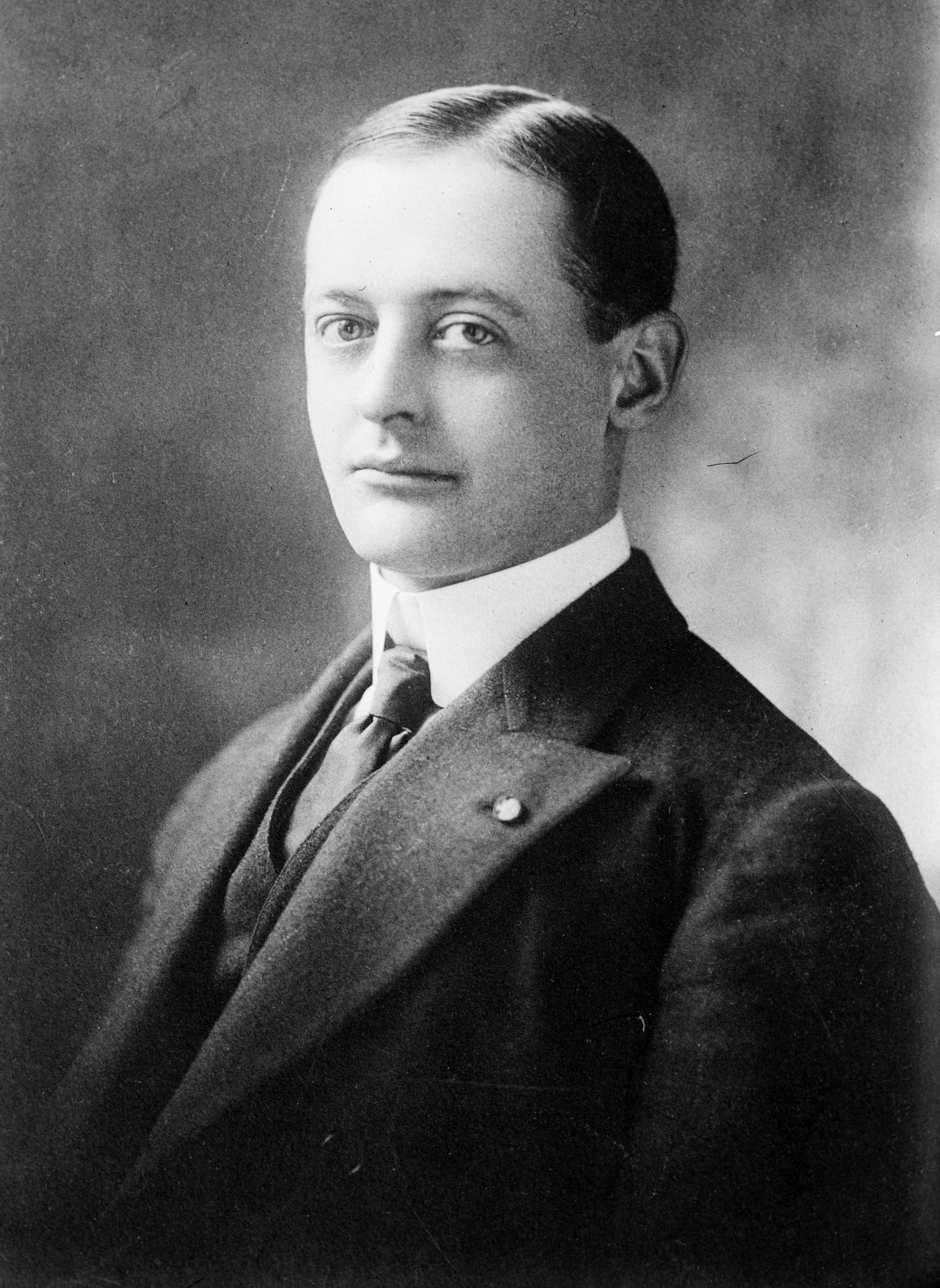

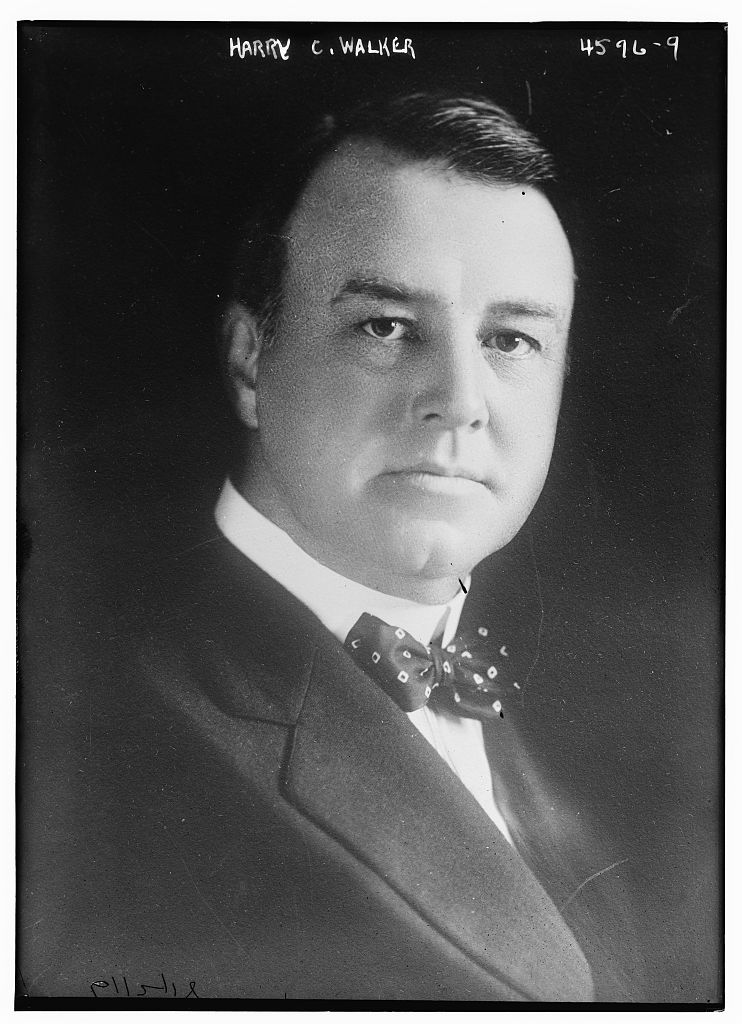

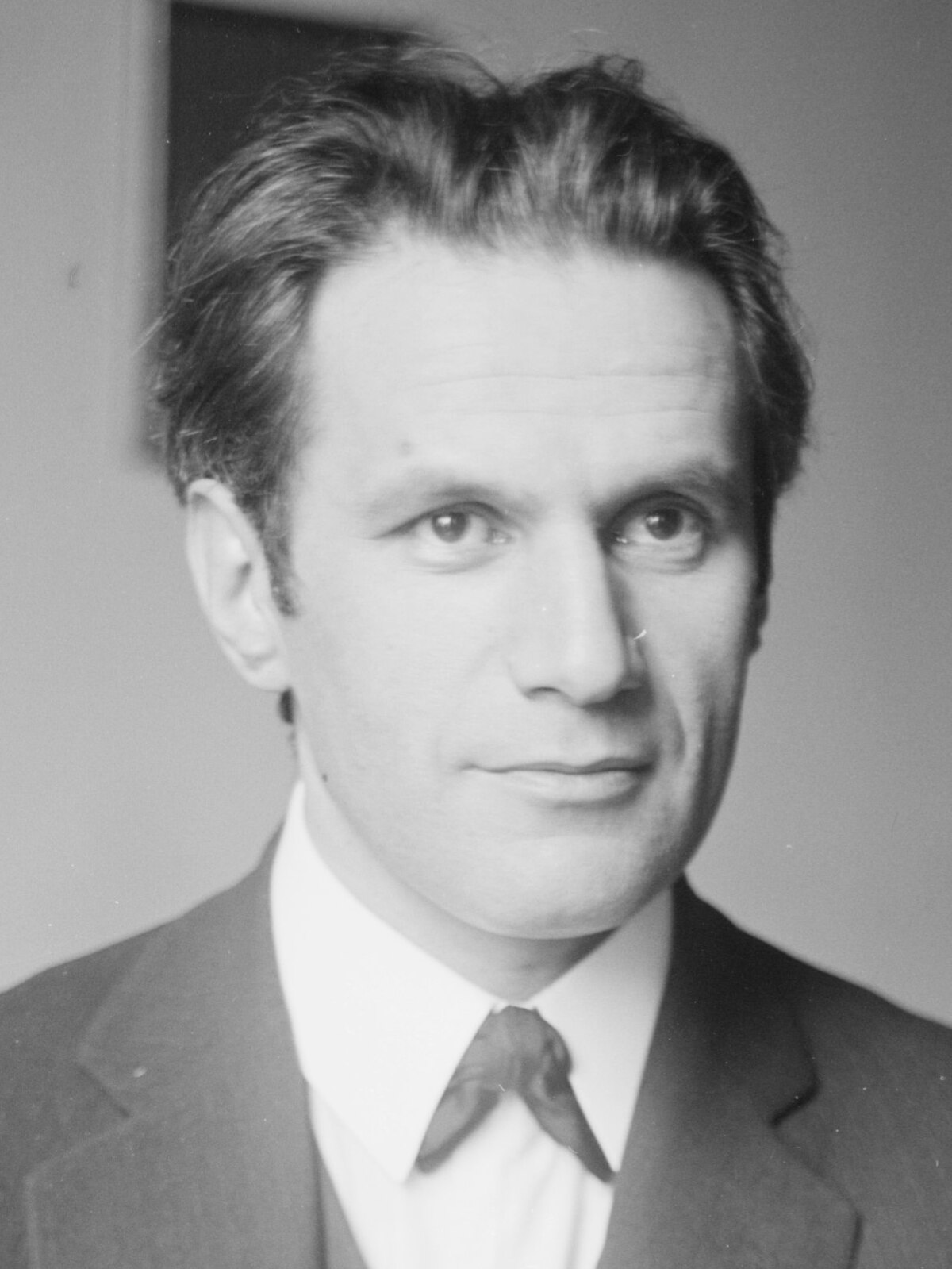

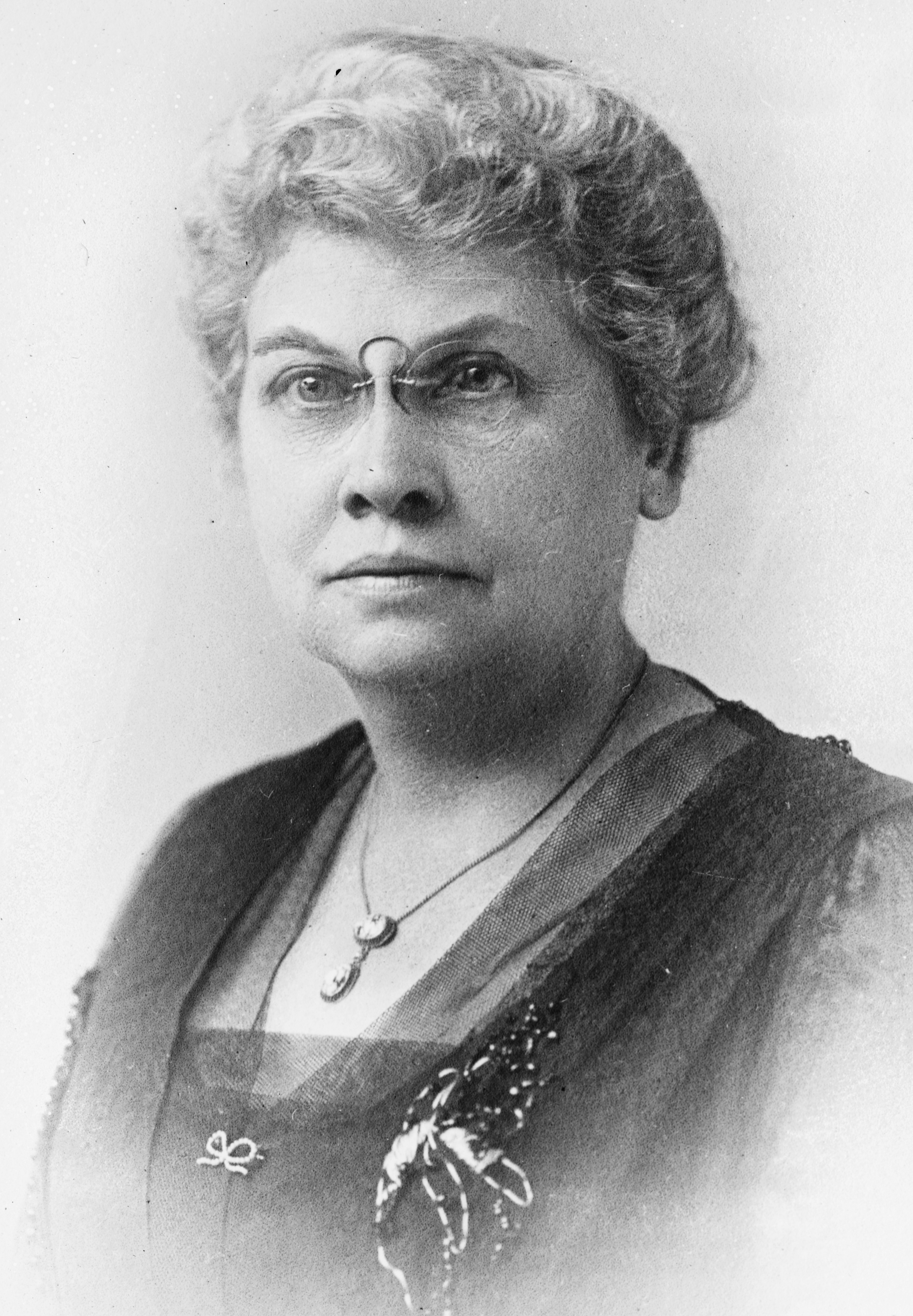
Nominee	James W. Wadsworth	Harry C. Walker
Party	Republican	Democratic
Popular vote	1,434,393	901,310
Percentage	52.37%	32.90%
Nominee	Jacob Panken	Ella A. Boole
Party	Socialist	Prohibition
Popular vote	208,155	159,623
Percentage	7.60%	5.83%
- County results Wadsworth: 30–40% 40–50% 50–60% 60–70%
Senator before election
James W. Wadsworth
Republican
Elected Senator
James W. Wadsworth
Republican

New York election
Party	Candidate	Votes	%
Republican	James Wolcott Wadsworth Jr. (incumbent)	1,434,393	52.36%
Democratic	Harry C. Walker	901,310	32.90%
Socialist	Jacob Panken	208,155	7.60%
Prohibition	Ella A. Boole	159,623	5.83%
Farmer–Labor	Rose Schneiderman	27,934	1.02%
Socialist Labor	Harry Carlson	7,822	0.29%
Majority		533,083	19.46%
Turnout		2,739,237	
Republican hold			

== North Carolina ==
1920 United States Senate election in North Carolina
- November 2, 1920
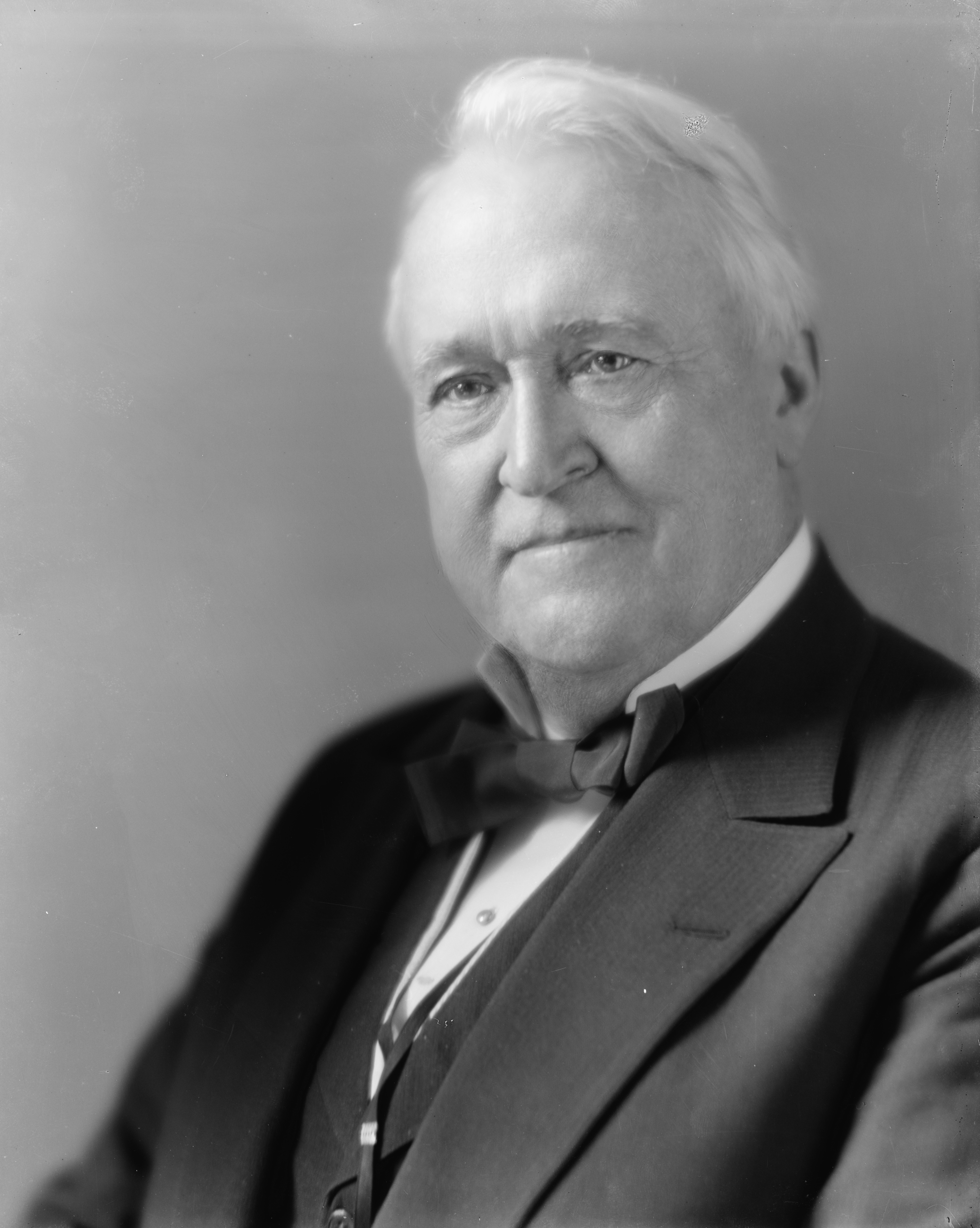

Nominee	Lee Slater Overman	A. E. Holton
Party	Democratic	Republican
Popular vote	310,504	229,343
Percentage	57.52%	42.48%
- County results Overman: 50–60% 60–70% 70–80% 80–90% 90–100% Holton: 50–60% 60–70% 70–80% 80–90%
U.S. senator before election
Lee Slater Overman
Democratic
Elected U.S. Senator
Lee Slater Overman
Democratic

North Carolina election
Party	Candidate	Votes	%
Democratic	Lee Slater Overman (incumbent)	310,504	57.52%
Republican	A. E. Holton	229,343	42.48%
Majority		81,161	15.04%
Turnout		539,847	
Democratic hold			

== North Dakota ==
1920 United States Senate election in North Dakota
- November 2, 1920
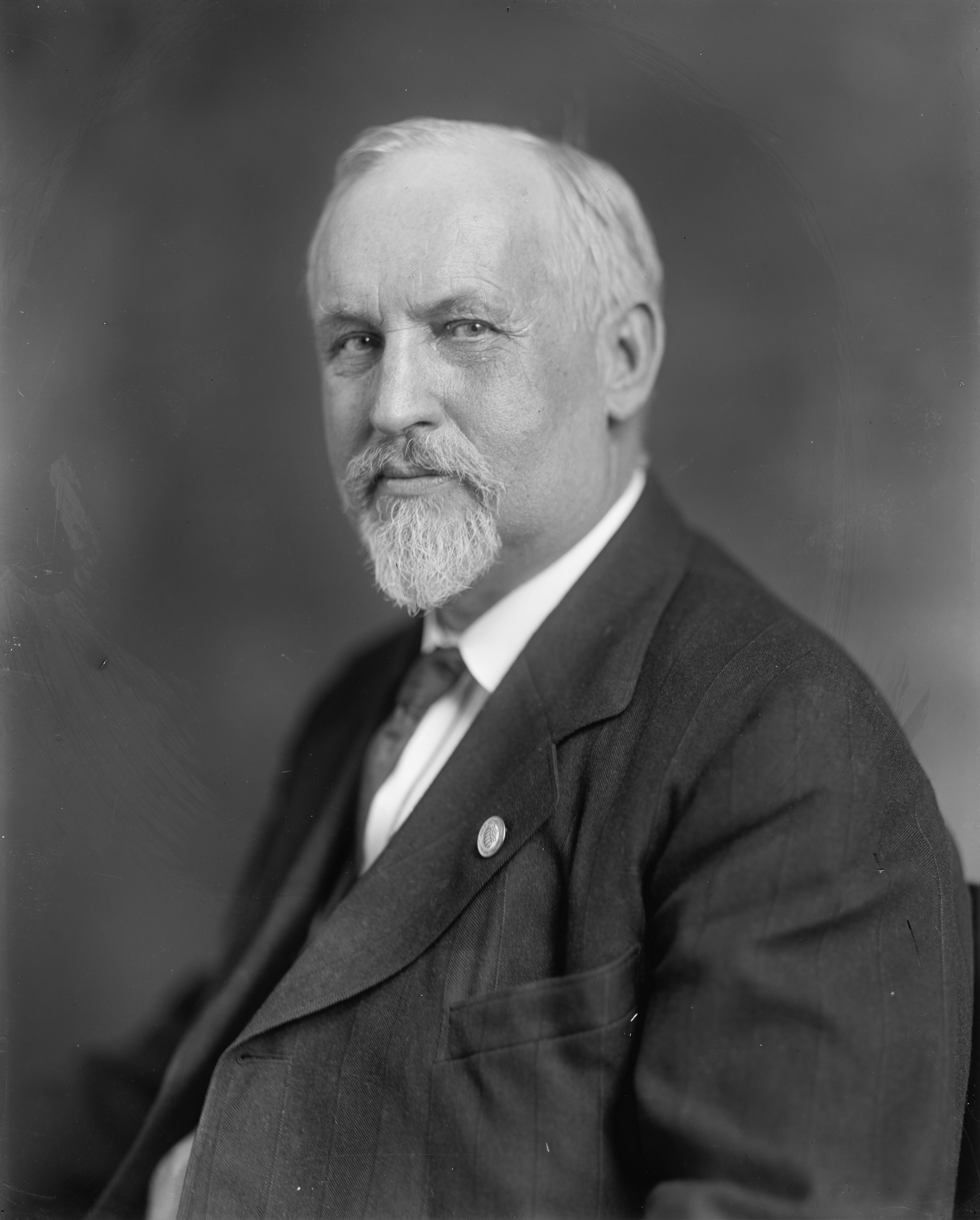

Nominee	Edwin F. Ladd	H. H. Perry
Party	Republican	Democratic
Popular vote	130,614	88,495
Percentage	59.61%	40.39%
- County results Ladd: 50–60% 60–70% 70–80% 80–90% Perry: 50–60%
U.S. senator before election
Gerald Nye
Republican
Elected U.S. Senator
Edwin F. Ladd
Republican

North Dakota election
Party	Candidate	Votes	%
Republican	Edwin F. Ladd	130,614	59.61%
Democratic	H. H. Perry	88,495	40.39%
Majority		42,109	19.22%
Turnout		219,109	
Republican hold			

== Ohio ==
1920 United States Senate election in Ohio
- November 2, 1920
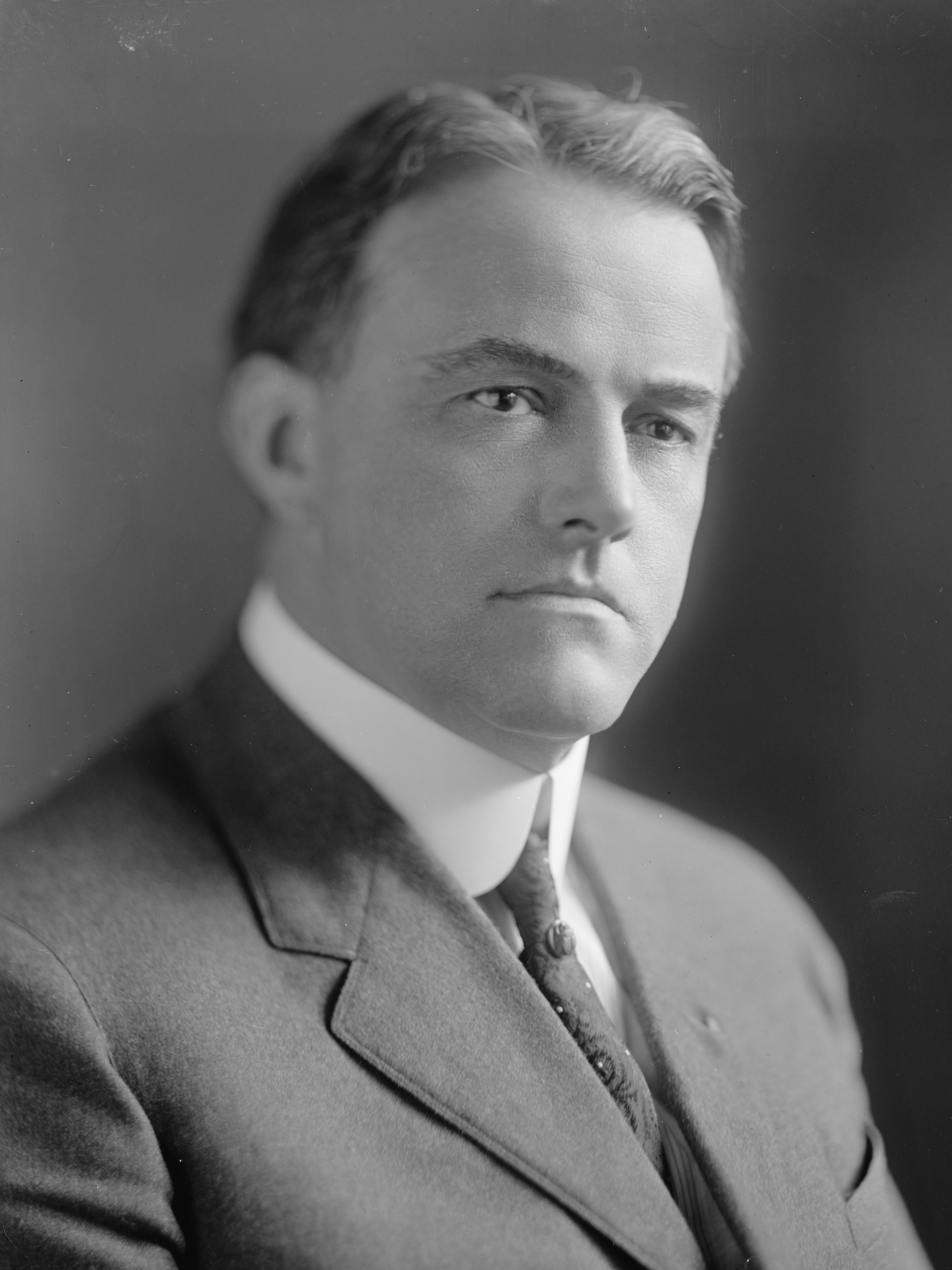

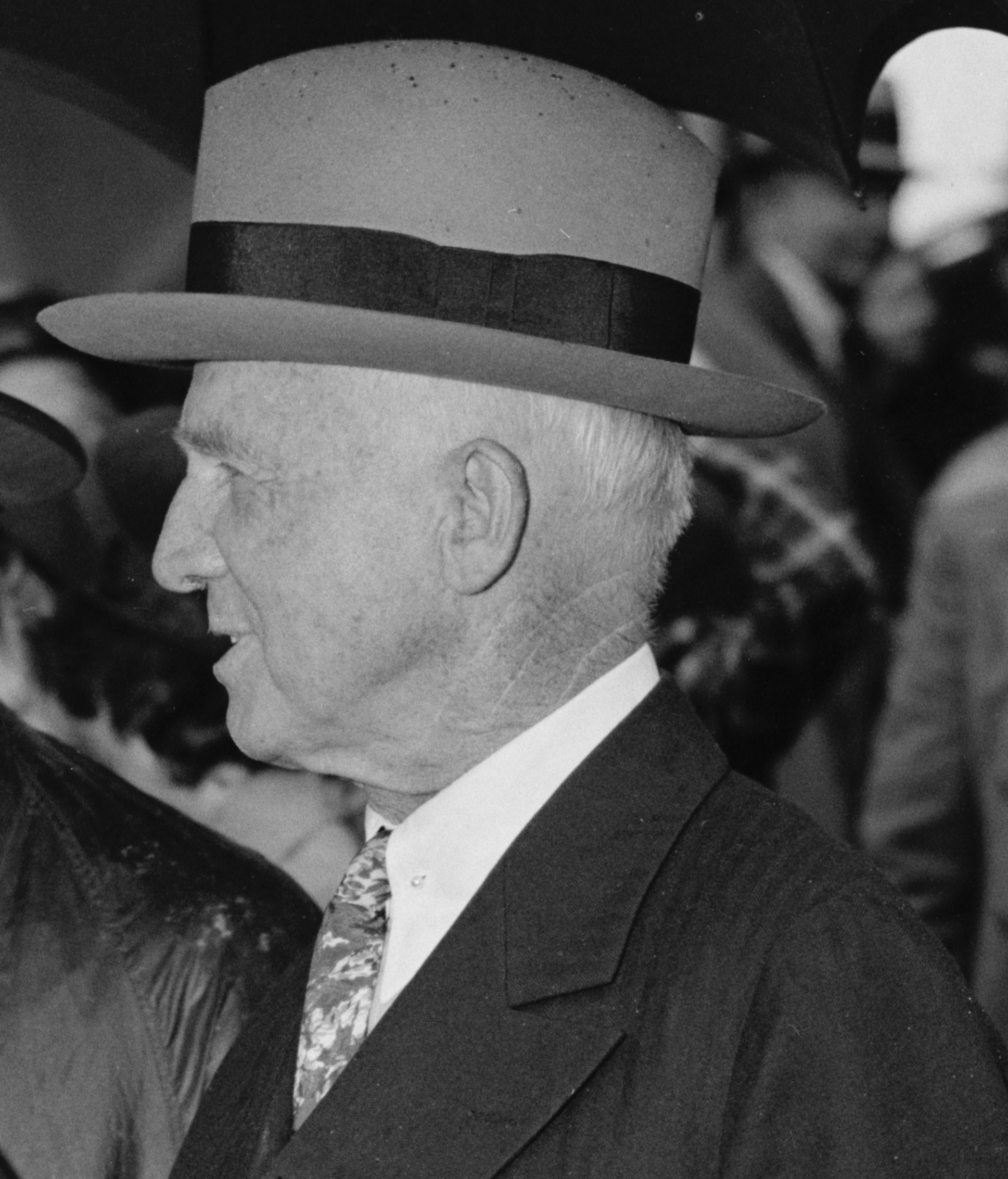
Nominee	Frank B. Willis	William Alexander Julian
Party	Republican	Democratic
Popular vote	1,134,953	782,650
Percentage	59.10%	40.76%
- County results Willis: 50–60% 60–70% 70–80% Julian: 50–60% 60–70%
U.S. senator before election
Warren G. Harding
Republican
Elected U.S. Senator
Frank B. Willis
Republican

Ohio election
Party	Candidate	Votes	%
Republican	Frank B. Willis	1,134,953	59.10%
Democratic	William Alexander Julian	782,650	40.76%
Independent	Henry B. Strong	2,647	0.14%
Majority		352,303	18.34%
Turnout		1,920,250	
Republican hold			

== Oklahoma ==
1920 United States Senate election in Oklahoma
- November 2, 1920
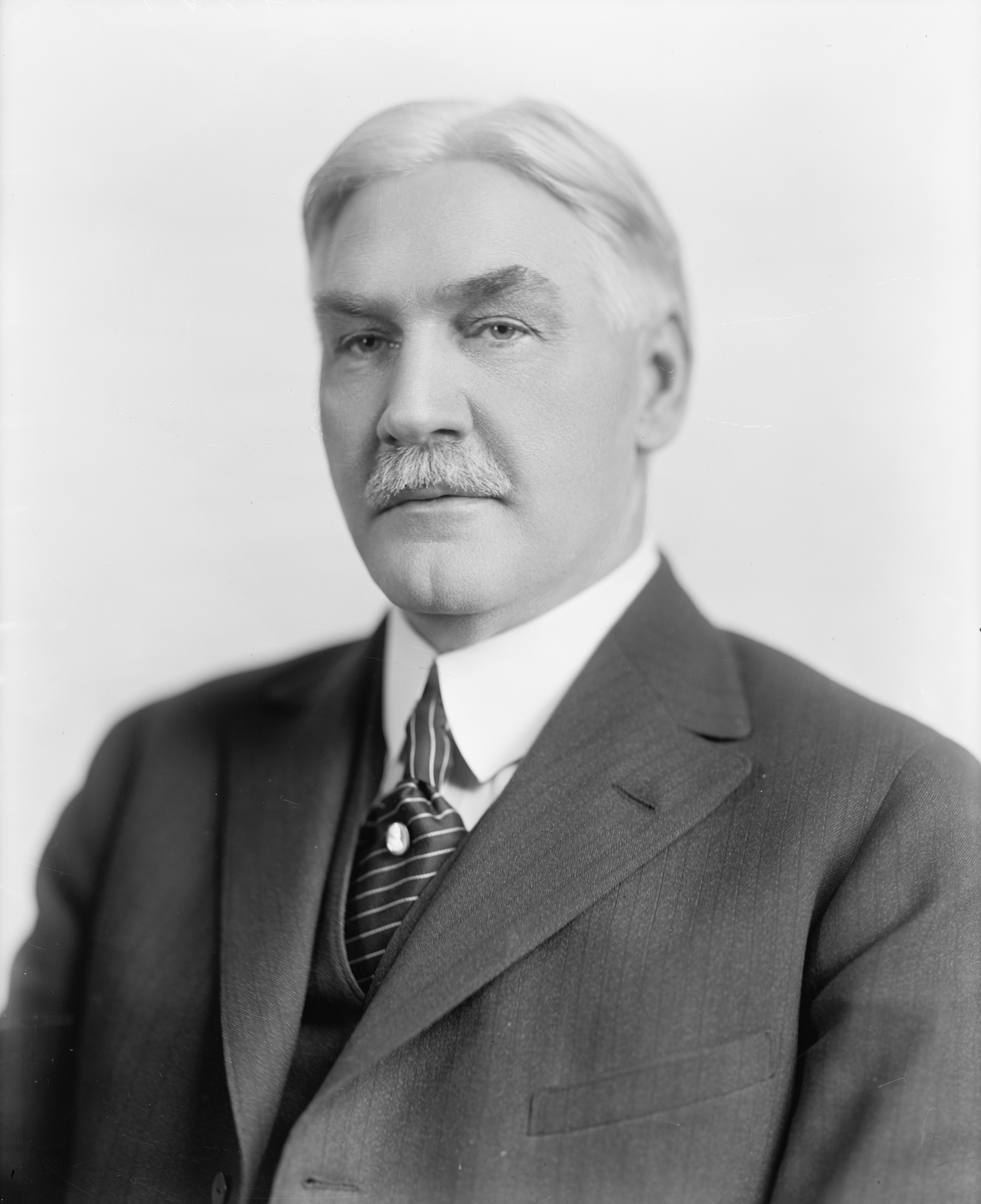

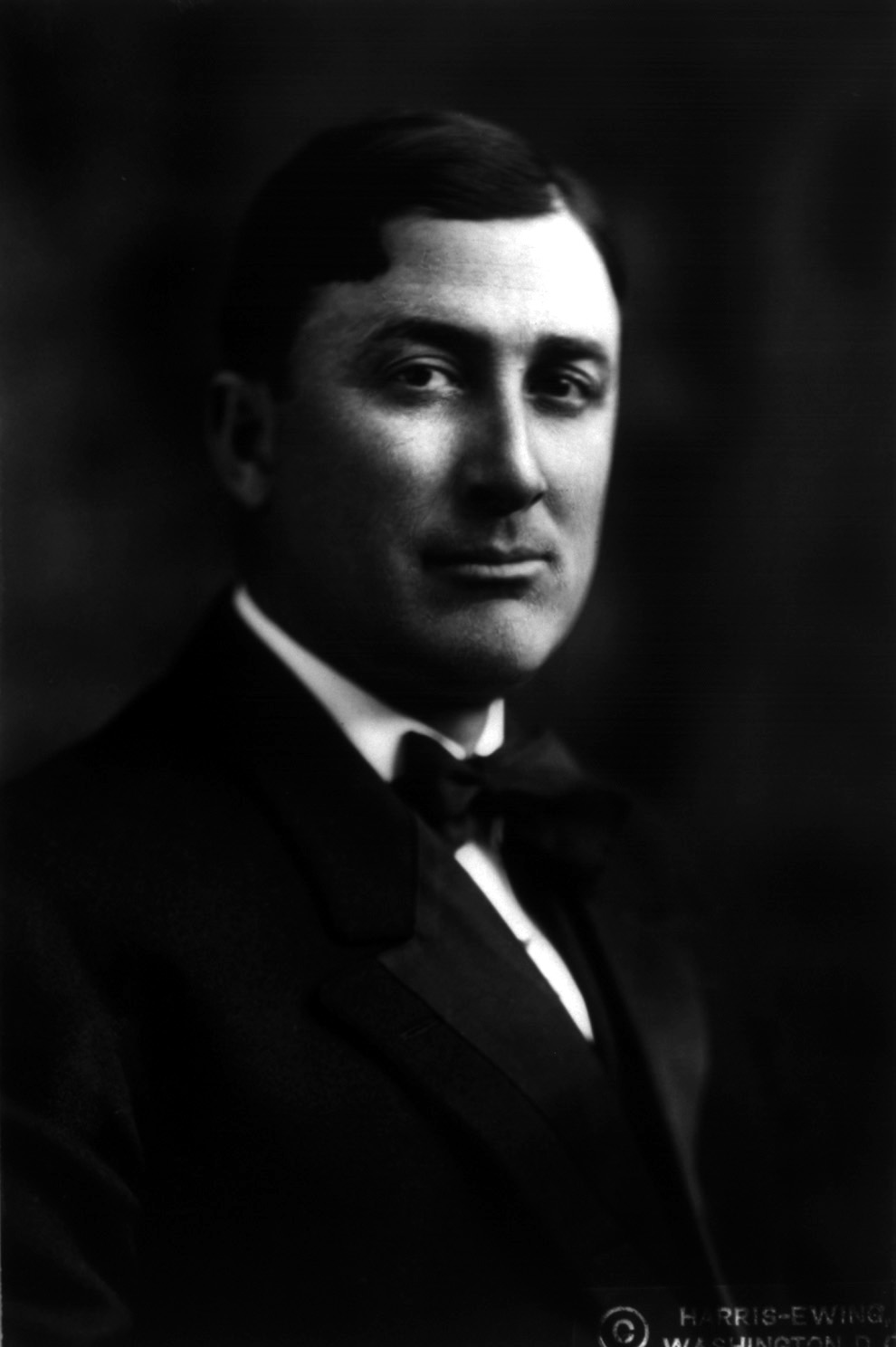
Nominee	John W. Harreld	Scott Ferris
Party	Republican	Democratic
Popular vote	247,719	217,783
Percentage	50.64%	44.52%
- County results Harreld: 40–50% 50–60% 60–70% Ferris: 50–60% 60–70% 70–80% 80–90%
U.S. senator before election
Thomas Gore
Democratic
Elected U.S. Senator
John W. Harreld
Republican

Oklahoma election
Party	Candidate	Votes	%
Republican	John W. Harreld	247,719	50.64%
Democratic	Scott Ferris	217,783	44.52%
Socialist	A. A. Bagwell	23,664	4.84%
Majority		29,936	6.12%
Turnout		489,166	
Republican gain from Democratic			

== Oregon ==
1920 United States Senate election in Oregon
- November 2, 1920
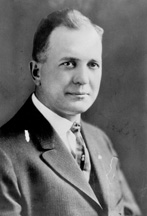

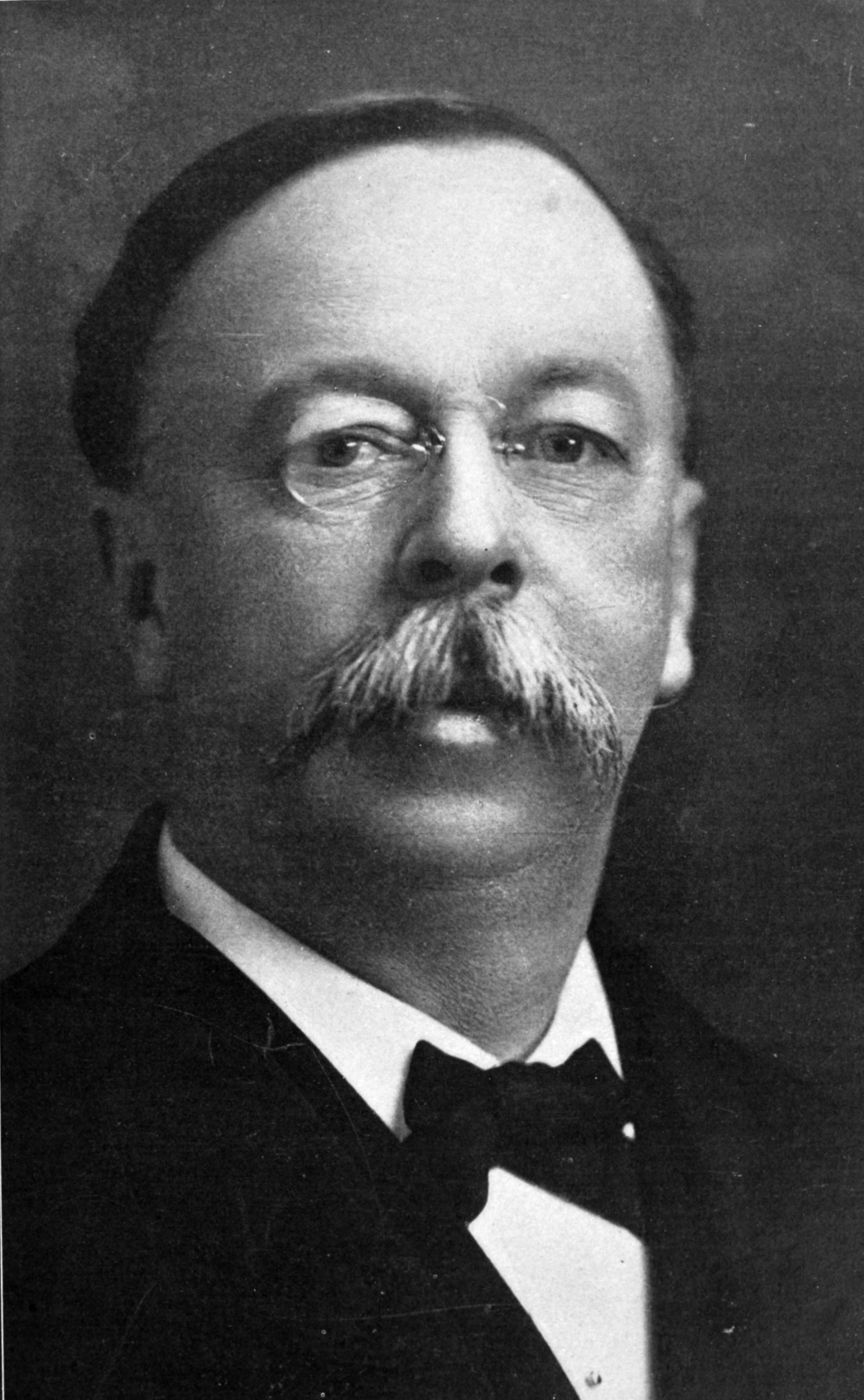
Nominee	Robert N. Stanfield	George Earle Chamberlain
Party	Republican	Democratic
Popular vote	116,696	100,133
Percentage	50.73%	43.53%
- County results Stanfield: 40–50% 50–60% 60–70% Chamberlain: 40–50% 50–60%
U.S. senator before election
George Earle Chamberlain
Democratic
Elected U.S. Senator
Robert N. Stanfield
Republican

Oregon election
Party	Candidate	Votes	%
Republican	Robert N. Stanfield	116,696	50.73%
Democratic	George Earle Chamberlain (incumbent)	100,133	43.53%
Socialist	Albert Slaughter	6,949	3.02%
Independent	Thomas A. Hayes	4,456	1.94%
Industrial Labor	C. H. Svenson	1,782	0.77%
Majority		16,563	7.20%
Turnout		230,016	
Republican gain from Democratic			

== Pennsylvania ==
1920 United States Senate election in Pennsylvania
- November 2, 1920
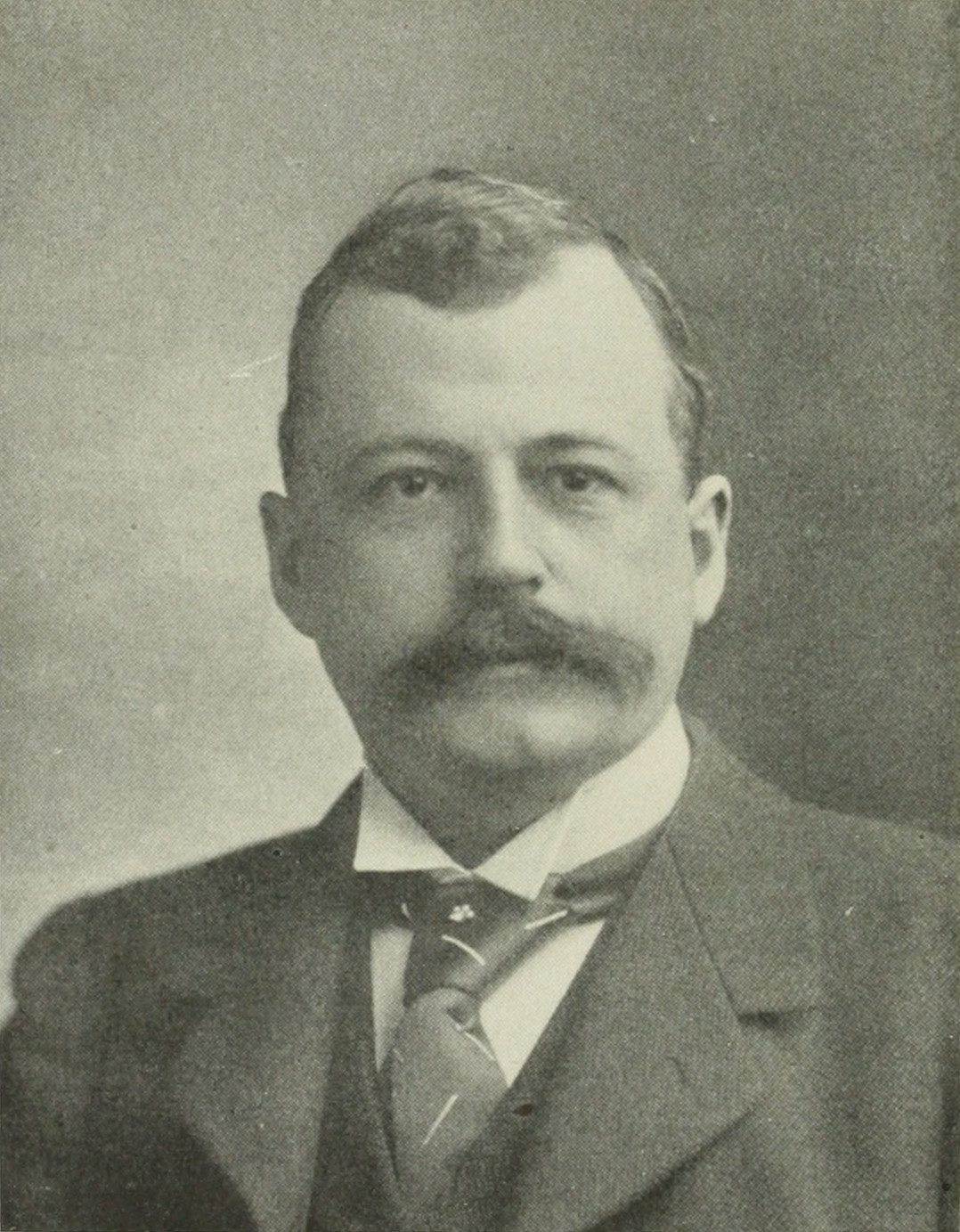

Nominee	Boies Penrose	John A. Farrell	Leah C. Marion
Party	Republican	Democratic	Prohibition
Popular vote	1,067,989	484,362	132,610
Percentage	59.94%	27.18%	7.44%
- County results Penrose: 40–50% 50–60% 60–70% 70–80% Farrell: 40–50% 50–60%
U.S. senator before election
Boies Penrose
Republican
Elected U.S. Senator
Boies Penrose
Republican

General election results
Party	Candidate	Votes	%
Republican	Boies Penrose (incumbent)	1,067,989	59.94%
Democratic	John A. Farrell	484,362	27.18%
Prohibition	Leah Cobb Marion	132,610	7.44%
Socialist	Birch Wilson	67,316	3.78%
Labor	Robert J. Wheeler	27,401	1.54%
Single Tax	Joseph E. Jennings	2,110	0.12%
None	Scattering	55	0.00%
Majority		583,627	32.76%
Turnout		1,781,843	
Republican hold			

== South Carolina ==
1920 South Carolina Democratic Senate primary runoff
- September 14, 1920
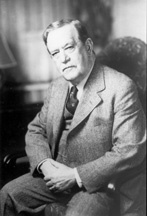

Nominee	Ellison D. Smith	George Warren
Party	Democratic	Democratic
Popular vote	65,880	42,735
Percentage	60.7%	39.3%
- Smith: 30–40% 40–50% 50–60% 60–70% 70–80% 80–90% Warren: 30–40% 40–50% 50–60% 60–70% 70–80% 80–90%
U.S. senator before election
Ellison D. Smith
Democratic
Elected U.S. Senator
Ellison D. Smith
Democratic

Democratic Primary Runoff
Candidate	Votes	%	±%
Ellison D. Smith	65,880	60.7	+12.0
George Warren	42,735	39.3	+8.5

South Carolina U.S. Senate Election, 1920
Party	Candidate	Votes	%
Democratic	Ellison D. Smith (incumbent)	64,388	100.00%
Independent	George Warren	1	0.00%
Majority		64387	100.00%
Turnout		64389	
Democratic hold			

== South Dakota ==
1920 United States Senate election in South Dakota
- November 2, 1920
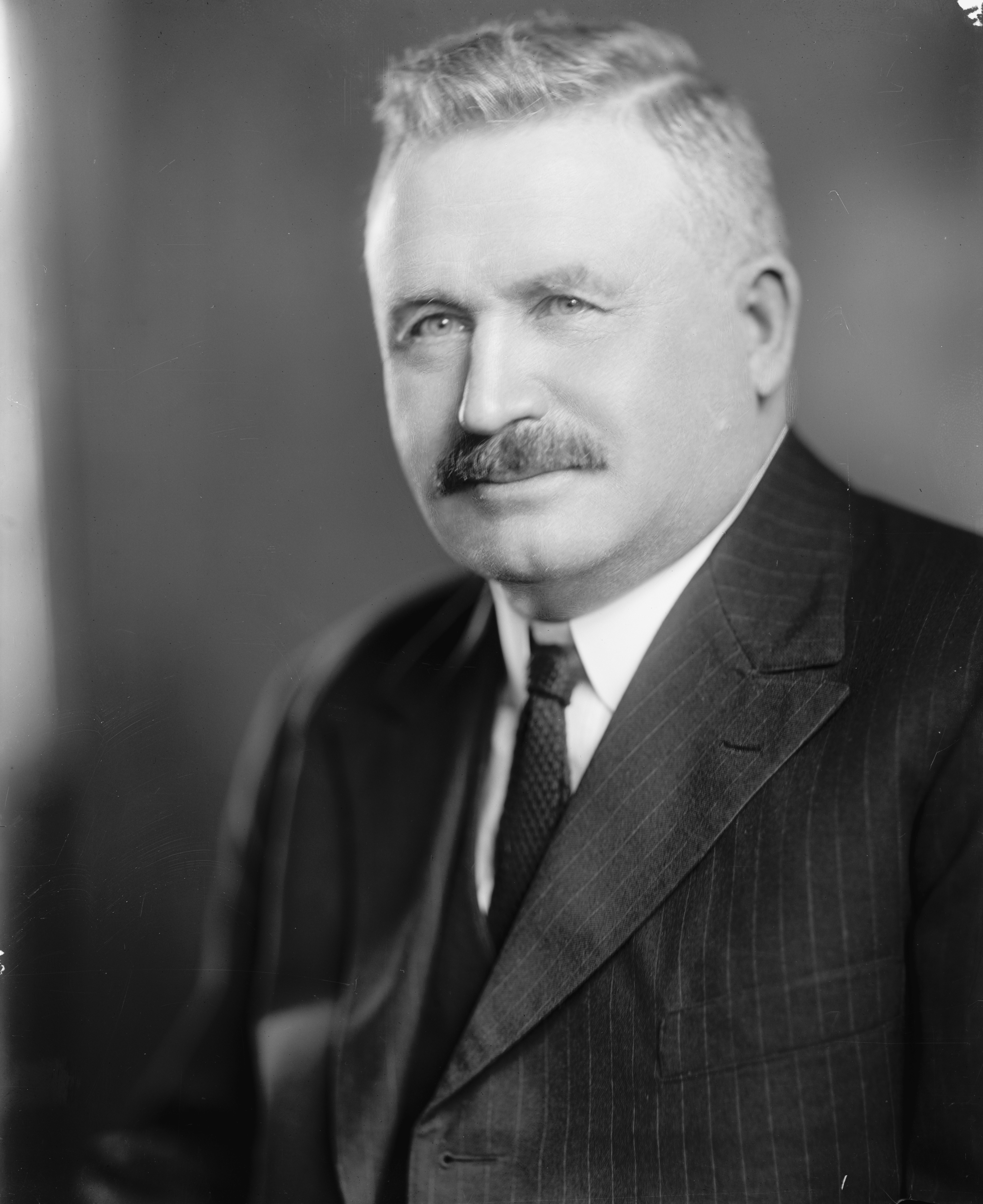

Nominee	Peter Norbeck	Tom Ayres
Party	Republican	Nonpartisan League
Popular vote	92,267	44,309
Percentage	50.10%	24.06%
Nominee	U. S. G. Cherry	R. O. Richards
Party	Democratic	Independent
Popular vote	36,833	10,032
Percentage	20.00%	5.45%
- County results Norbeck: 30–40% 40–50% 50–60% 60–70% Ayres: 30–40% 40–50% 50–60% Richards: 30–40% No Vote
U.S. senator before election
Edwin S. Johnson
Democratic
Elected U.S. Senator
Peter Norbeck
Republican

South Dakota election
Party	Candidate	Votes	%
Republican	Peter Norbeck	92,267	50.10%
Independent	Tom Ayres	44,309	24.06%
Democratic	U. S. G. Cherry	36,833	20.00%
Independent	Richard Olsen Richards	10,032	5.45%
Independent	L. J. Manbeck	738	0.40%
Majority		47,958	26.04%
Turnout		184,179	
Republican hold			

== Utah ==
1920 United States Senate election in Utah
- November 2, 1920
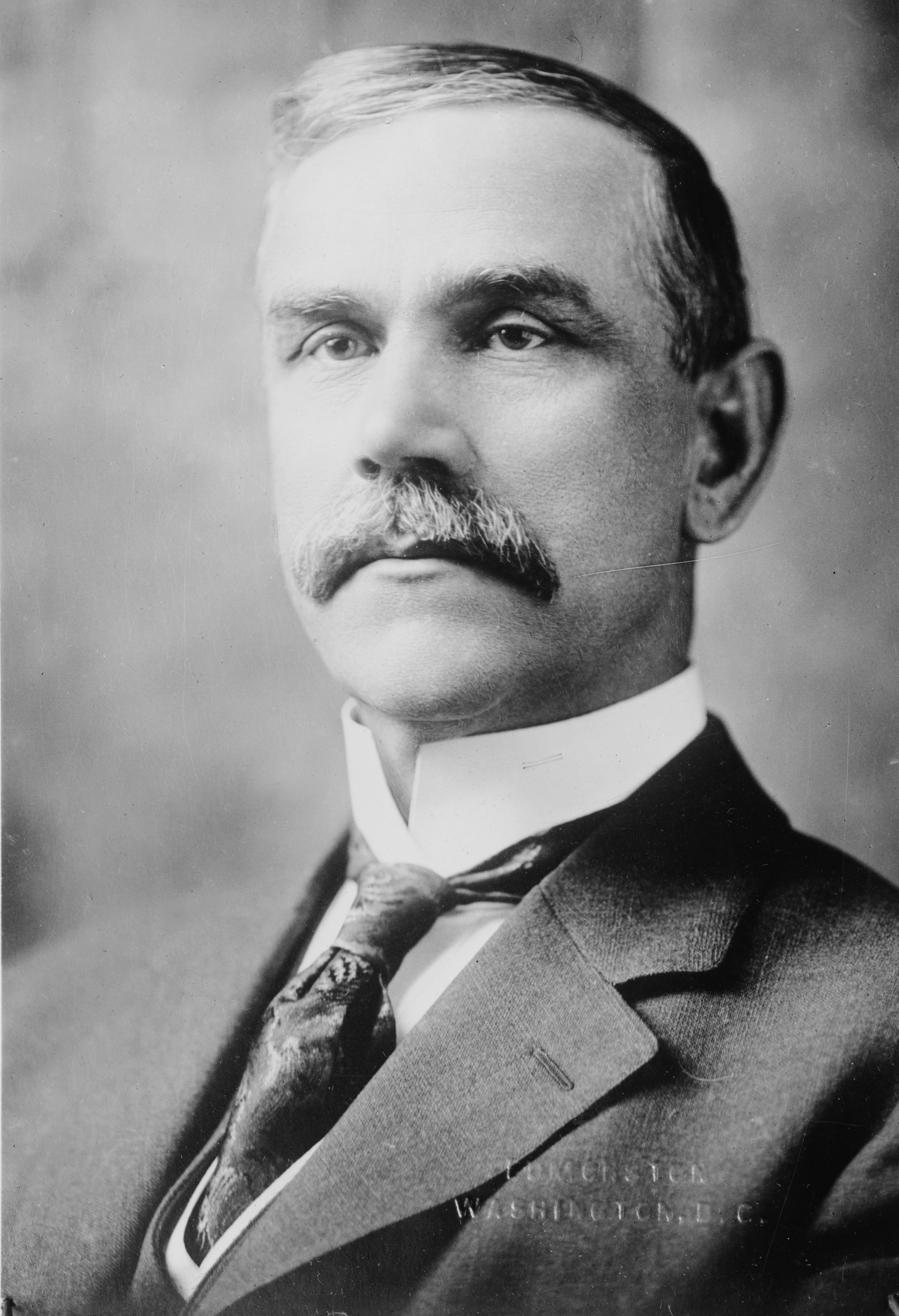

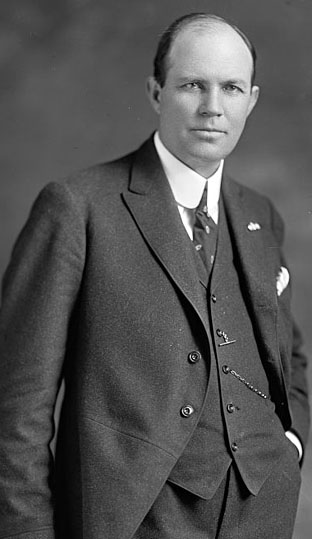
Nominee	Reed Smoot	Milton H. Welling
Party	Republican	Democratic
Popular vote	82,566	56,280
Percentage	56.57%	38.56%
- County results Smoot: 40–50% 50–60% 60–70% 70–80%
U.S. senator before election
Reed Smoot
Republican
Elected U.S. Senator
Reed Smoot
Republican

Utah election
Party	Candidate	Votes	%
Republican	Reed Smoot (incumbent)	82,566	56.57%
Democratic	Milton H. Welling	56,280	38.56%
Socialist	J. Alex Beven	7,112	4.87%
Majority		26,286	18.01%
Turnout		145,958	
Republican hold			

== Vermont ==
1920 United States Senate election in Vermont
- November 2, 1920
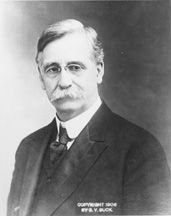

Nominee	William P. Dillingham	Howard Shaw
Party	Republican	Democratic
Popular vote	69,650	19,580
Percentage	78.1%	21.9%
U.S. senator before election
William P. Dillingham
Republican
Elected U.S. Senator
William P. Dillingham
Republican

1920 United States Senate election in Vermont
Party	Candidate	Votes	%
Republican	William P. Dillingham (incumbent)	69,650	78.02%
Democratic	Howard E. Shaw	19,580	21.93%
None	Scattering	41	0.05%
Majority		50,070	56.09%
Total votes		89,271	
Republican hold			

== Virginia (special) ==
1920 United States Senate special election in Virginia
- November 2, 1920
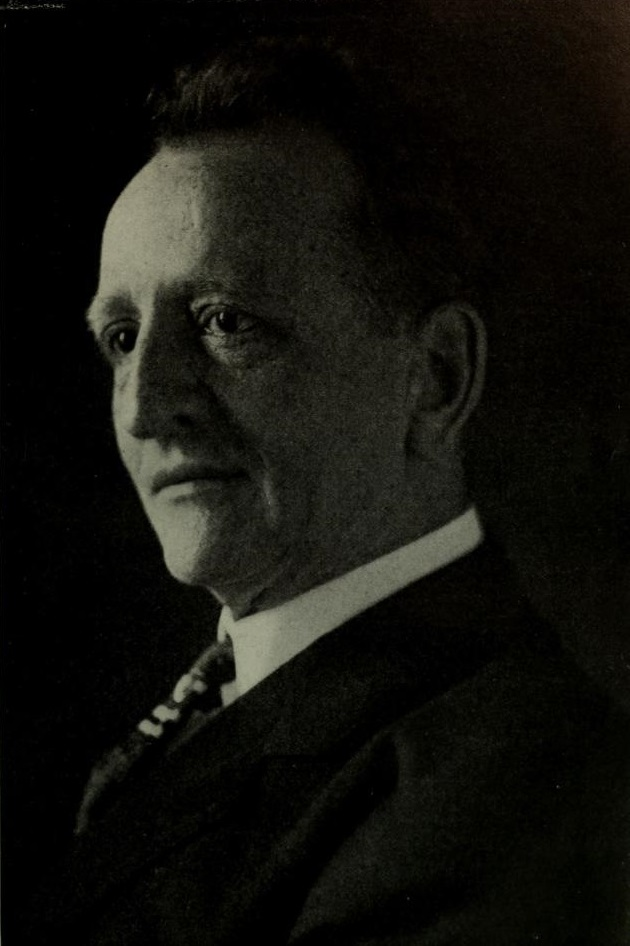

Nominee	Carter Glass	J. R. Pollard
Party	Democratic	Republican
Popular vote	184,646	17,576
Percentage	91.3%	8.7%
U.S. senator before election
Carter Glass
Democratic
Elected U.S. Senator
Carter Glass
Democratic

Virginia special election
Party	Candidate	Votes	%
Democratic	Carter Glass (incumbent)	184,646	91.31%
Republican	J. R. Pollard	17,576	8.69%
Majority		167070	82.62%
Total votes		202,222	
Democratic hold			

== Washington ==
1920 United States Senate election in Washington
- November 2, 1920
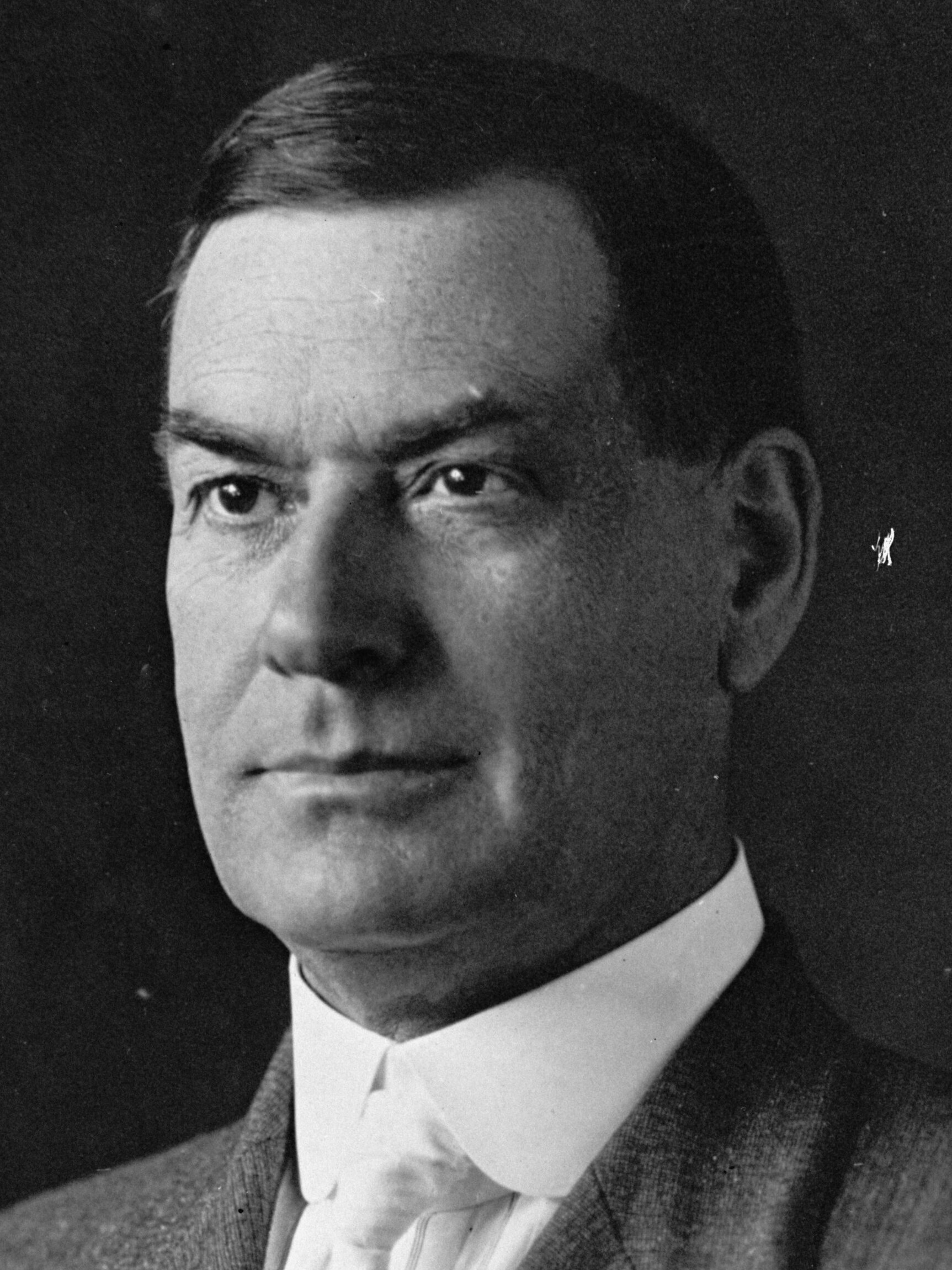

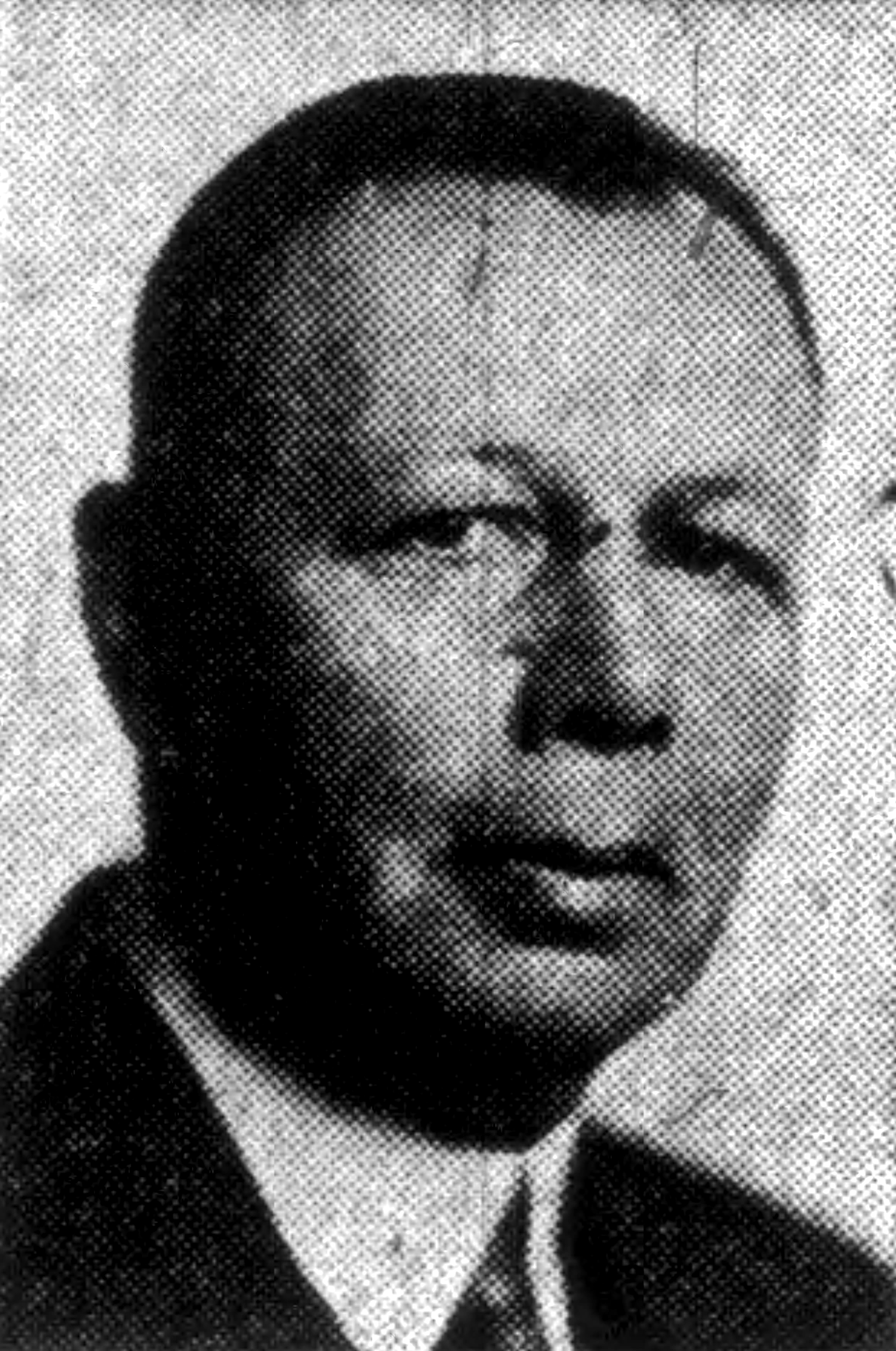

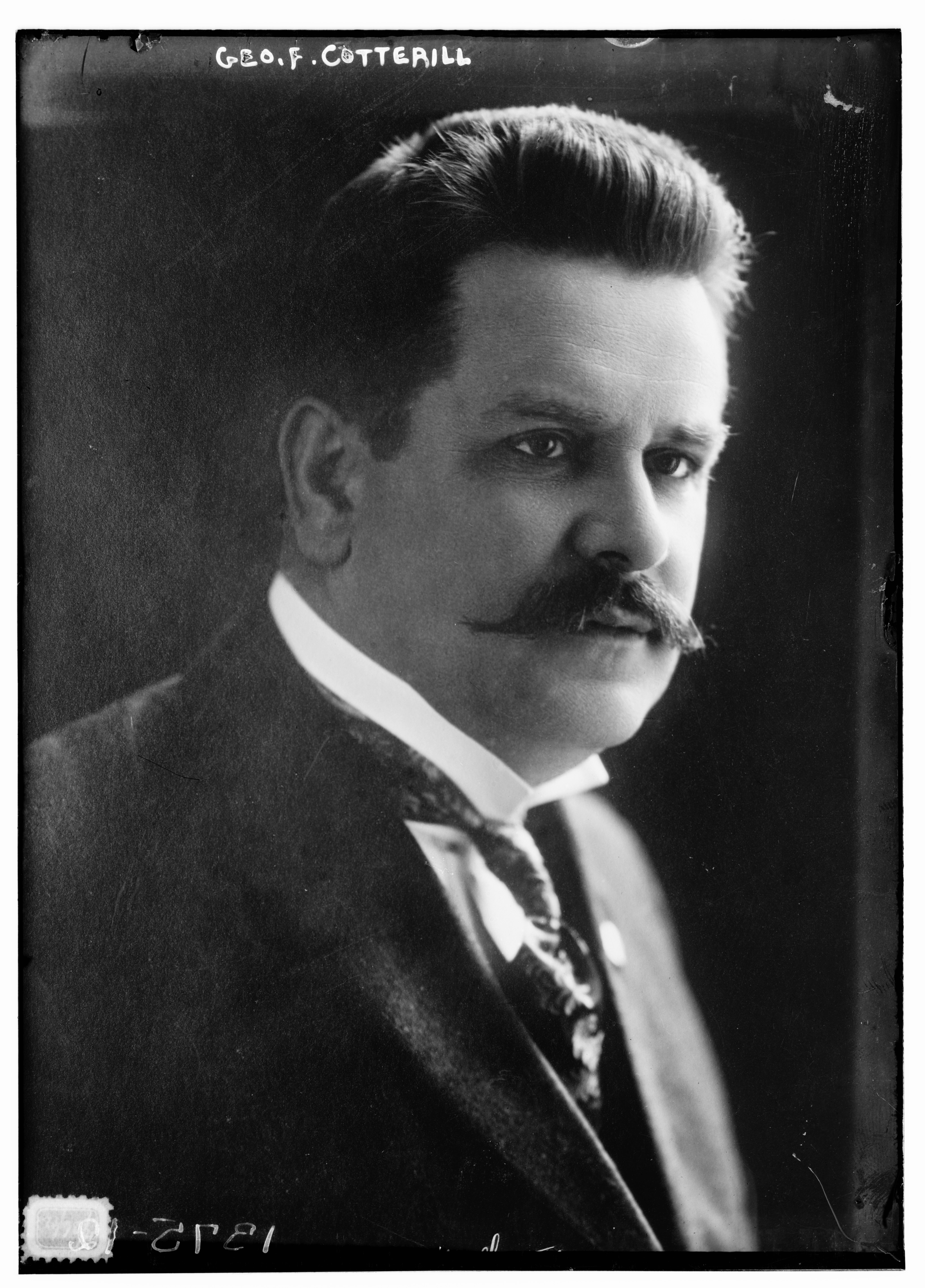
Nominee	Wesley L. Jones	Clemens J. France	George F. Cotterill
Party	Republican	Farmer–Labor	Democratic
Popular vote	164,130	99,309	68,488
Percentage	56.40%	25.80%	17.80%
- Results by county Jones: 30–40% 40–50% 50–60% 60–70%
[[List of United States senators from {{{country}}}|U.S. senator]] before election
Wesley Livsey Jones
Republican
Elected U.S. Senator
Wesley Livsey Jones
Republican

Washington election
Party	Candidate	Votes	%
Republican	Wesley Livsey Jones (incumbent)	217,069	56.40%
Farmer–Labor	Clemens J. France	99,309	25.80%
Democratic	George F. Cotterill	68,488	17.80%
Majority		117,760	30.60%
Turnout		384,866	
Republican hold			

== Wisconsin ==
1920 United States Senate election in Wisconsin
- November 2, 1920
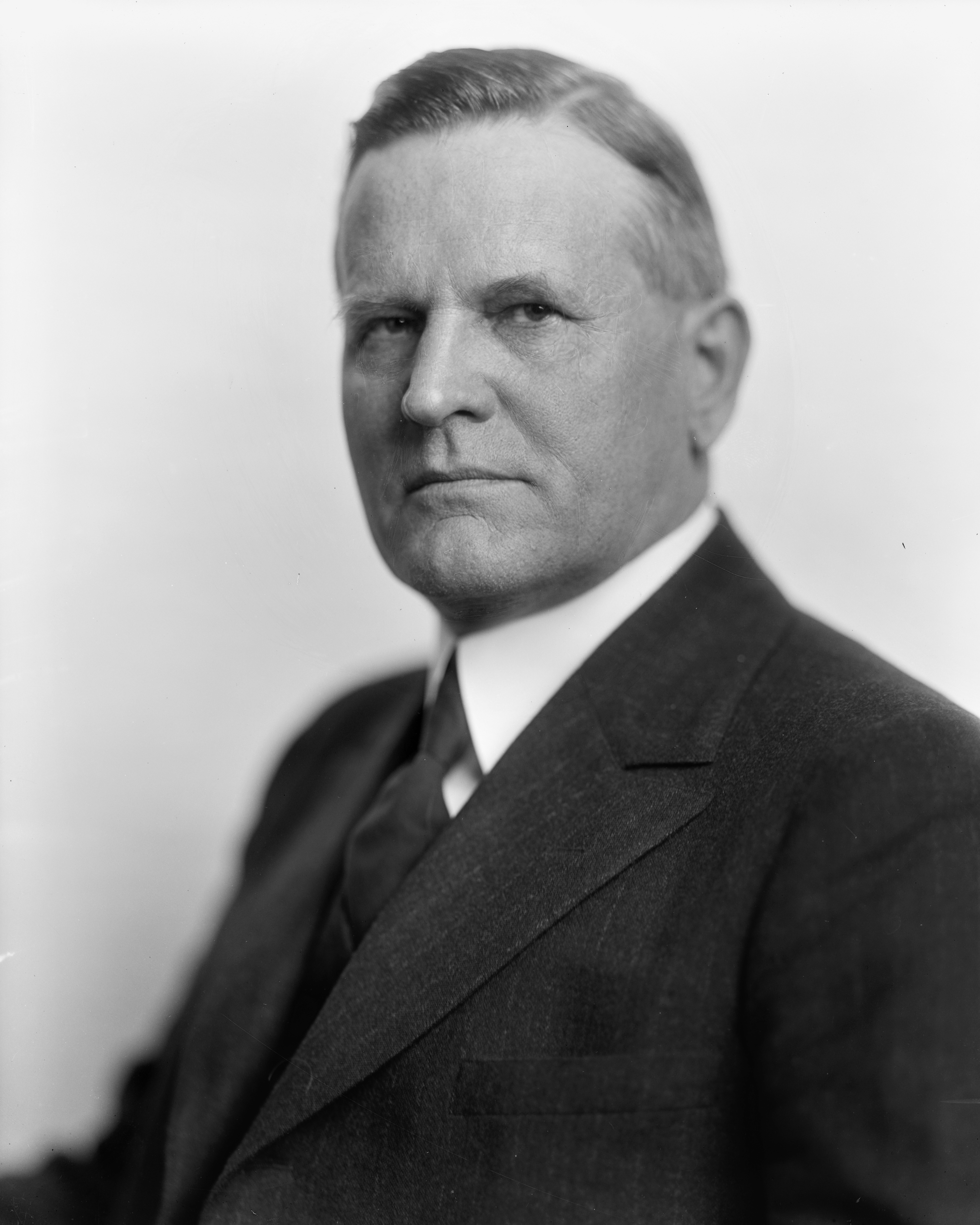

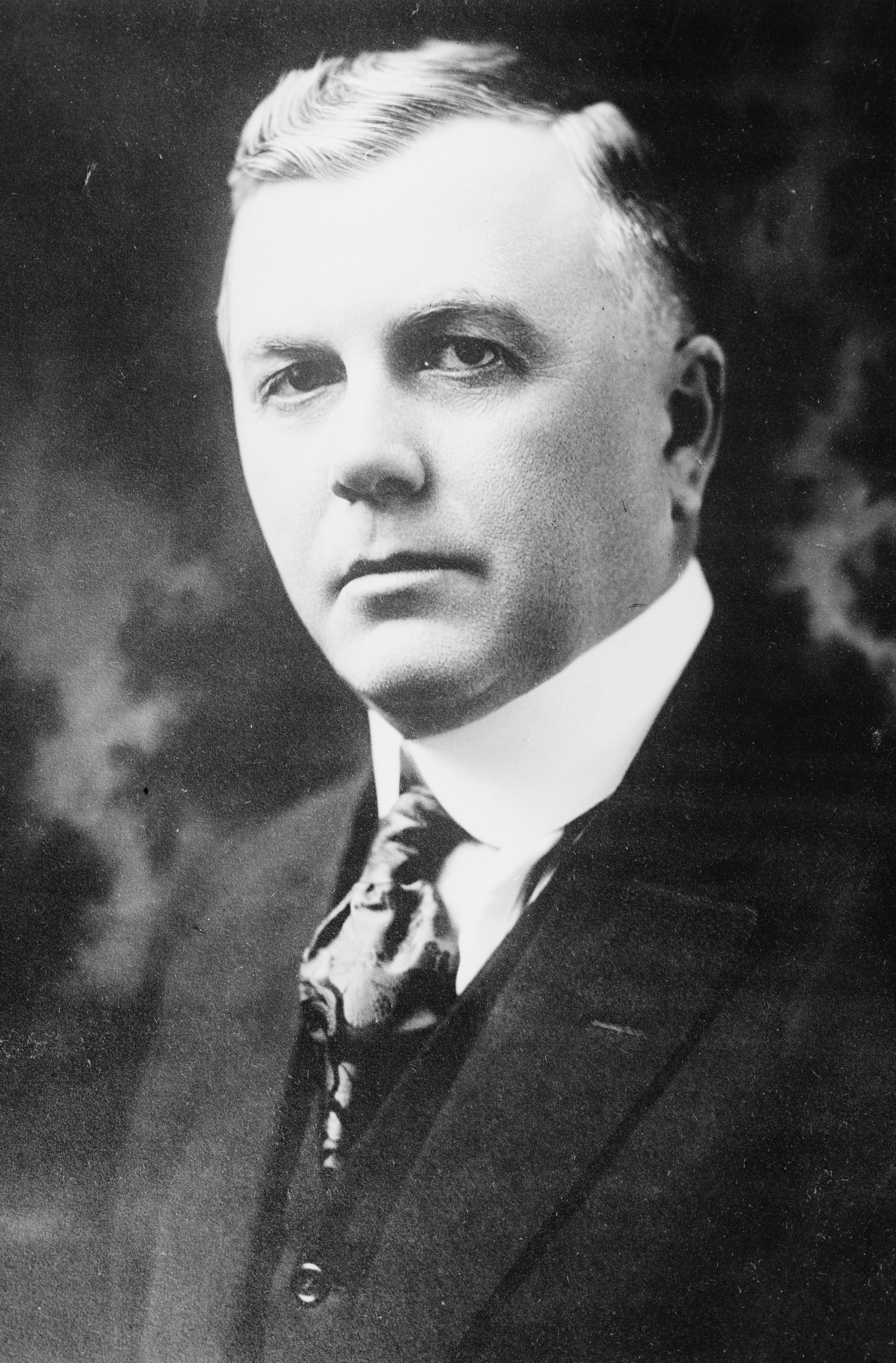

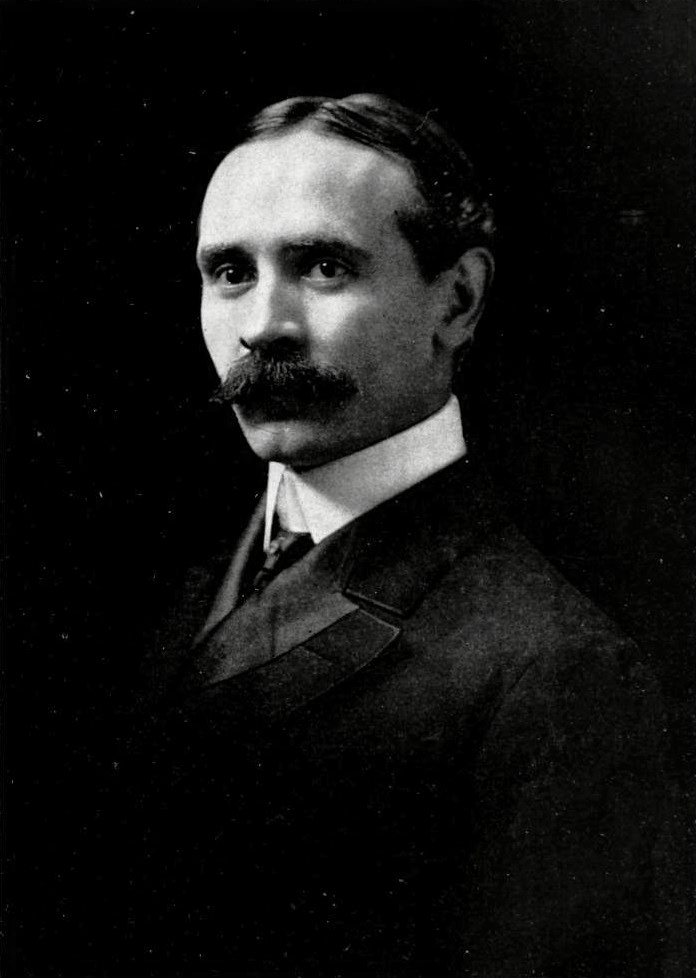

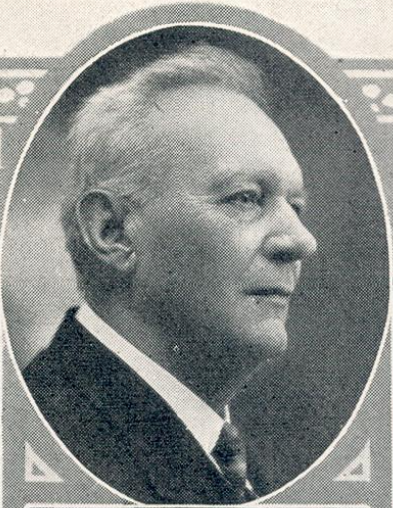
Nominee	Irvine Lenroot	James Thompson
Party	Republican	Independent Republican
Popular vote	281,576	235,029
Percentage	41.58%	34.71%
Nominee	Paul S. Reinsch	Frank J. Weber
Party	Democratic	Socialist
Popular vote	89,265	66,172
Percentage	13.18%	9.77%
- County results Lenroot: 30–40% 40–50% 50–60% 60–70% 70–80% Thompson: 30–40% 40–50% 50–60% 60–70% Weber: 20–30%
U.S. senator before election
Irvine Lenroot
Republican
Elected U.S. Senator
Irvine Lenroot
Republican

Wisconsin election
Party	Candidate	Votes	%
Republican	Irvine Lenroot (incumbent)	281,576	41.58%
Independent	James Thompson	235,029	34.71%
Democratic	Paul Samuel Reinsch	89,265	13.18%
Socialist	Frank J. Weber	66,172	9.77%
Prohibition	Clyde D. Mead	5,107	0.75%
None	Scattering	3	0.00%
Majority		46,547	6.87%
Turnout		677,152	
Republican hold			

== See also ==
- 1920 United States elections
  - 1920 United States presidential election
  - 1920 United States gubernatorial elections
  - 1920 United States House of Representatives elections
- 66th United States Congress
- 67th United States Congress
