= 1920 Farmer–Labor National Convention =

1920 Farmer-Labor National Convention
- 1920 presidential election
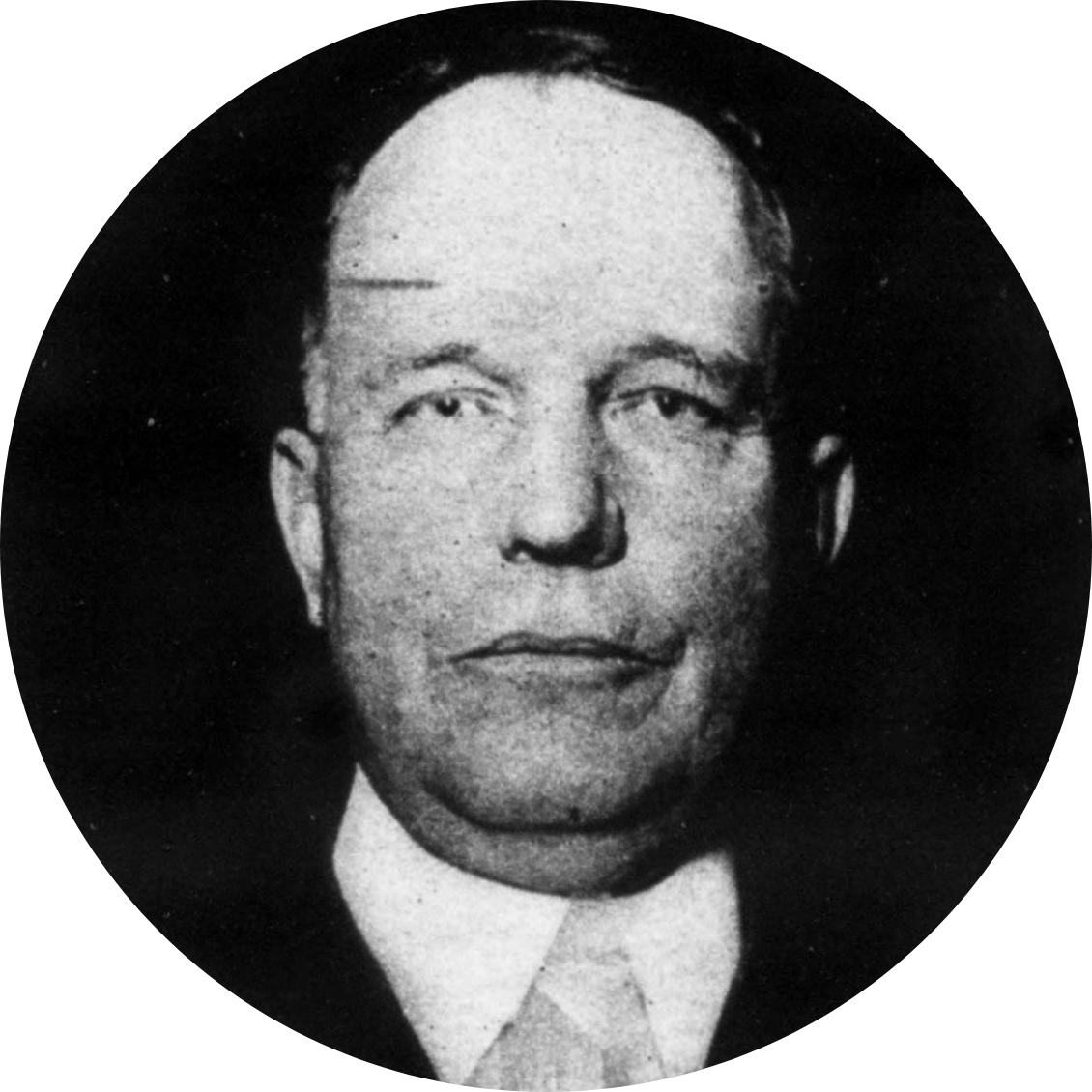
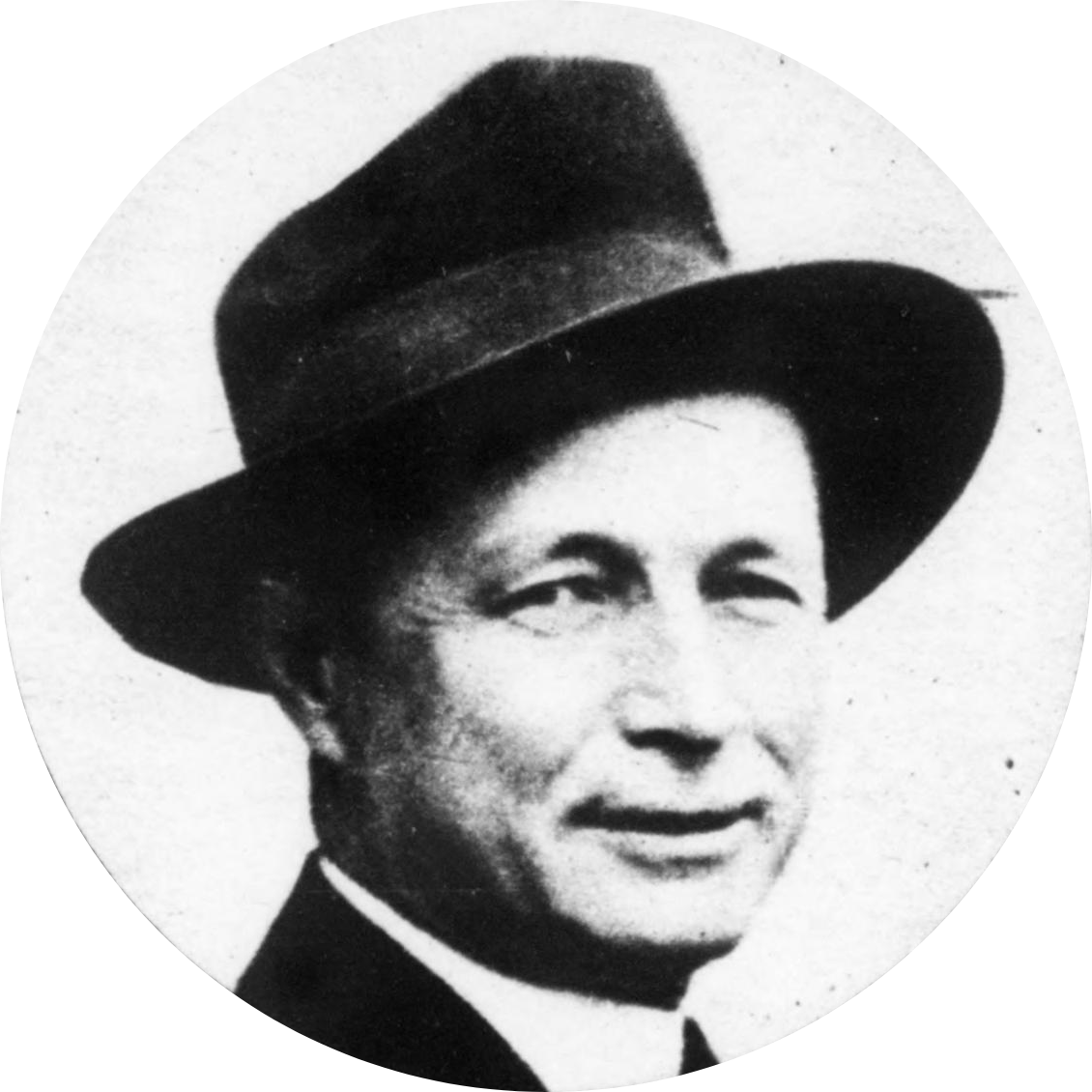
- Nominees (Christensen and Hayes)

Convention
- Date(s): July 11–15, 1920
- City: Chicago, Illinois
- Venue: Street Car Men's Hall

Candidates
- Presidential nominee: Parley P. Christensen of Utah
- Vice-presidential nominee: Max S. Hayes of Ohio
- Ballots: 2 (for president); 1 (for vice president)

The Labor Party of the United States convened a national presidential nominating convention in Chicago, Illinois, on July 11, 1920. On July 13, the convention voted to merge with the Committee of 48 to form a new party, which the convention voted the following day to name the Farmer–Labor Party.

The convention nominated Parley P. Christensen (Utah state representative) for president and Max S. Hayes (party chairman and newspaper editor from Cleveland, Ohio) for vice president.

== Background ==
The Labor Party had held its founding convention in November 1919 at the same venue it held its 1920 national convention. The party as established as a merger of several political groups.

=== Committee of 48 ===
The Committee of 48 opted to also hold their own 1920 convention in Chicago at the same time that the Labor Party held their national convention. The Committee of 48 was hopeful of merging with the Labor Party, while the Labor Party largely desired to remain independent. No working agreement had been reached by the two party's on a possible merger framework prior to the start of their conventions.

The national chairman of the Committee of 48 was J. A. H. Hopkins. The chairman of their convention was Parley P. Christensen. Other leading figures of the Committee of 48 included Dudley Field Malone and Allen McCurdy. Amos Pinchot was a major leader of its more right-wing grouping. It convened at the Morrison Hotel.

Merger discussions during the convention were prolonged.

== Convention logistics ==
The convention was called by the Labor Party for the purposes of nominating a presidential ticket for the 1920 United States presidential election. It was held at Street Car Men's Hall in Chicago. Its sessions convened July 11–14. The venue was described to be poorly-ventilated.

Beyond the Committee of 48, various other groups held coinciding gatherings in Chicago during the convention. This included a group of more radical labor activists (who opposed the American Federation of Labor), Single Tax Party, and the National Grange.

=== Convention officers ===
When the convention first convened, Max S. Hayes presided as temporary chairman. At the first session, a vote was held to elect the permanent chairman. Nominated as candidate for the role were Francis J. Dillon (of the Indiana Labor Party), James Duncan (president of the Central Labor Council of Seattle, and a past candidate for mayor of Seattle), and John H. Walker (president of the Illinois Federation of Labor). Three rounds of balloting were held, with Dillon being eliminated on the second ballot. Walker prevailed over Duncan on third ballot, by a vote of 237–158. After this, Duncan was unanimously voted the convention's vice chairman.

During the evening session on July 13, after the members of the Committee of 48 formally joined the convention, J.A.H. Hopkins was voted to serve as joint-chairman, alongside Walker. Mary Tudor Garland was thereafter elected joint vice chairman.

=== Deliberations leading to merger with the Committee of 48 ===
On the first day of the convention, conference committees of the Labor Party and Committee of 48 held hours of discussion and adopted three resolutions which recommended merging the two organizations. Discussions were launched about a name for a merged organization. Deliberations for a merger with the Committee of 48 were ongoing during the early days of the convention, with agreement being struck by July 13 to such a point that the conventions merged and the delegates of theLabor Party and Group of 48 agreed to form a political party under a single name.

=== Trade unions and organizations represented at convention ===
Sixty trade unions and organizations were represented at the convention. These included:

- American Union Against Militarism
- Chicago University Liberal Club
- Farmers' Education and Co-operative Alliance
- Farmers' Organization
- Friends of Freedom for India
- Kansas City Yardsmen's Association
- Loyal Star LEague
- National People's League
- Nonpartisan League
- Nurses' Association of Chicago
- Organization for World War Veterans
- Plumb Plan League
- Single Tax Party withdrew from convention after July 13 evening session
- Welfare Association of Washington
- Women's Trade Union League
- Young Democracy

=== Convention schedule ===
==== July 11 ====
- call to order at 11:15 AM local time
- welcoming address by John Fitzpatrick, president of the Chicago Federation of Labor
- address by Max S. Hayes
- presentation of report by Frank J. Esper, secretary of the national party
- introduction of resolution by Committee of 48 to develop a common agreement for a merger, presented by Clemens J. France of Washington on behalf of the Committee of 48
- debate, and vote on resolution from the Committee of 48
- election of Robert M. Buck as permanent chairman of Resolutions Committee
- election of John H. Walker as permanent chairman of the convention
- election of James Duncan as convention vice chair
- vote passed thanking Max S. Hayes for his work on behalf of the party
- address by Tarak Nath Das, revolutionary activist of India (representing Friends of Freedom for India)

==== July 12 ====
- address by Lester Barlow, national organizer of World War Veterans
- principal afternoon address by Frank P. Walsh
- presentation of report by Frank J. Esper, secretary of the national party
- address by F.A. Moeller, on behalf of the Non-Partisan League
- address by Carl Thomas (former national secretary of the Public Ownership League), on behalf of the Public Ownership League
- address by Robert W. Bagnall, representing the NAACP
- address by Maude McCreery (former Milwaukee Leader journalist), on behalf of the Federated Press
- address by Winnie Bransetter, on behalf of the Prison Comfort club
- address by Rafeale Mallen, on behalf of Cooperative Wholesale
- address by Katherine McCullough, on behalf of the National League of Women Voters
- address by H. Austin Simmons, secretary of the Freedom Foundation
- debate and deliberation on concessions demanded by the Committee of 48

==== July 13 (morning session) ====
- several resolutions adopted

==== July 13 (afternoon session) ====
- Committee of 48 members join convention
- election of J. A. H. Hopkins (of the National Executive Committee of the Committee of 48) as the convention's joint-chairman (Note: to act alongside previously-elected chairman, John H. Walker)
- Mary Tudor Garland elected joint vice chairman
- addresses by officers of the Committee of 48:
  - address by J. A. H. Hopkins (chairman of the national Executive Committee of the Committee of 48; joint-chair of the convention)
  - address by Allen McCurdy (secretary of the National Executive Committee of the Committee of 48)
  - address by Amos Pinchot (member of the National Executive Committee of the Committee of 48)
- address by O.M. Thomasson (of the Non-Partisan League)
- motion unanimously ratified to merge the Labor Party and Committee of 48 into a single political party
- report of the Education and Organization Committee presented by Lillian Herstein (committee chair)
- resolutions endorsing the co-operative movement introduced by Robert M. Buck (chairman of the Resolutions Committee); are objected to by Melinda Alexander (acting secretary of the Committee of 48) on the grounds that they were authored by the Resolutions Committee before the party merger, and motioned for the Platform Committee to newly reconvene along with members from the Committee of 48. The convention thereafter allowed for the Platform committee to reconvene in this manner.
- address by Dudley Field Malone
- Parley P. Christensen reads convention a message from Robert M. La Follette (U.S. senator from Wisconsin), in which La Follette declines to be party's nominee
- session adjourned after it became clear that the Platform Committee would not be prepared to issue its report that evening

==== July 14 (morning session) ====
- resolution adopted that convention vote allocation to state delegations be made in proportion to their number of electoral votes, and not the unit system previously to be used
- announcement made that the Platform Committee would be prepared to make its report later in the day (at 2:00pm local time)
- Bastille Day recognized with a singing of La Marseillaise
- John H. Walker (convention co-chair) announces to convention that LaFollette had more definitively declared he would not make himself available as a candidate for the party's presidential nomination; Lester Barlow (organizer of the World War Veterans) reacted by alleging underhanded intrigue seeking to prevent LaFollette's nomination. Several delegates demanded for LaFollette's own platform be read before the reading of the convention's own proposed platform, while other delegates unfurled banners calling on the convention to draft La Follette. It took Walker approximately 30 minutes to calm the convention before business could be resumed
- motions to present LaFollette's own platform (or any other platform) before that of the Platform Committee ruled out-of-order
- presentation by Robert M. Buck (chairman of the platform committee) of the Platform Committee's report
- presentation by George L. Record (member of the platform committee) of a minority report authored by dissenting Platform Committee members
- deliberation on platform
- adoption of the platform that had been endorsed by the majority of Platform Committee members
- remarks by Gilbert E. Roe (New York attorney, former law partner of Senator La Follette)
- plank on education introduced as an amendment to the platform, adopted after debate

==== July 14 (afternoon session) ====
- discussion and vote on name of the new party; debate on whether or not the Committee of 48 should remain a separate organization
  - walk-out by approximately 100 Forty-Eighters
- balloting for presidential nomination
- balloting for vice presidential nomination
- Convention adjourned at 4:00 AM local time on July 15

== Presidential nomination ==
While Robert M. La Follette was a popularly supported name for the nomination. However, he declined to accept it if nominated by the party, viewing the platform of the party as being too radical. On July 13, while the general session of the convention was largely passing time as the Platform Committee privately reconvened, Parley P. Christiansen read a message from La Follette. In the message, La Follette stated that he would like to lead their new party, but would ultimately decline their nomination because he felt he could better serve the United States in a different way. La Follette's son, Robert M. La Follette Jr., spoke on July 14 to deliver a more clear message to the convention that La Follette would not accept their nomination.

Eugene V. Debs was initially put forward as a candidate, but his name was withdrawn per the request of the Socialist Party of America (which had already made Debs their nominee at their own convention). Otto Branstetter took to the floor of the Farmer–Labor convention to make the request that Debs' name be withdrawn. Despite his name being withdrawn, he still received 68 votes in the first round of balloting. Lynn J. Frazier had not wanted the nomination, but was put forward as a candidate against his own wishes.

Dudley Field Malone's candidacy for the nomination received backing from many labor leaders.

Notably for the era, a woman (Jane Addams) had her name placed for the convention's balloting. However, her name was withdrawn after the convention was informed that Addams had declared she would not accept the party's nomination.

=== Candidates for presidential nomination ===
Names placed for nomination

- Herbert Bigelow, minister from Cincinnati, Ohio
- Parley P. Christensen of Utah,
- John Fitzpatrick of Illinois, president of the Chicago Federation of Labor and 1919 Chicago mayoral candidate
- Lynn Frazier, governor of North Dakota
- Dudley Field Malone of New York
- Henry Ford industrialist from Detroit, Michigan
- Louis F. Post, United States assistant secretary of labor

Withdrawn

- Jane Addams of Illinois,
- Eugene V. Debs, presidential nominee of the Socialist Party
- Robert M. La Follette, U.S. senator from Wisconsin and former governor of Wisconsin

=== Balloting for presidential nomination ===
After the first ballot, a motion (aimed at hastening the nomination) was successfully adopted to eliminate all candidates except Malone and Christensen. After being nominated, Christensen addressed the convention.

First ballot

- Christensen: 166 votes
- Malone: 121.1 votes
- Debs withdrawn: 68 votes
- Ford: 12.3
- Frazier: 9
- Bigelow: 7
- Post: 1.6

Second ballot

- Christensen: 192.5
- Malone: 174.7

== Vice presidential nomination ==
The nomination of Hayes for vice president was largely an olive branch labor leaders that initially felt dejected after Dudley Field Malone failed to secure the presidential nomination. Hayes, however, had declared before balloting that he would not want to be nominated.

=== Candidates for vice presidential nomination ===
More than twenty names were formally put forward for the vice presidential nomination. Moist of which were withdrawn, with only three names remaining by the balloting.

- Lester Barlow, organizer for World War Veterans from Minnesota
- Carrie Chapman Catt of New York
- Max S. Hayes, newspaper editor and party organizer from Ohio

Withdrawn

- Robert M. Buck, labor leader from Chicago
- James Duncan, labor leader from Seattle, Washington
- Duncan McDonald, labor leader from Chicago

=== Balloting for vice presidential nomination ===
Only a single round of balloting was necessary for vice president. A vast majority of votes went to Hayes, with Barlow receiving only 10 votes and Catt receiving only 2.

== Party platform, resolutions, and committee reports ==
=== Writing and adoption of platform ===
A platform of the convention was drafted before the merger with the Committee of 48. After the merger, the platform committee was reconvened so that the committee could rewrite the platform with added input from new members coming from the Committee of 48.

An effort was made to (prior to the platform committee's report) submit an alternative report of a platform reputed to be acceptable to Senator La Folettee. The convention chair ruled that motions to present LaFollette's own platform (or any other platform) before that of the Platform Committee were out-of-order. During subsequent commotion, La Follette allies then alleged that the convention was "boss ridden and clique controlled"

When the platform committee issued its report subsequent to the post-merger revisions, a minority group consisting of several members from the Committee of 48 presented a minority report as its preferred alternative to the platform. However, the convention ultimately adopted the platform of the majority report.

==== Committee of 48 schism ====
A faction of the Committee of 48 that was dissatisfied with the platform ultimately bolted from the convention, and resumed the separate Committee of 48 convention as a rump faction. This group (numbering approximately 100 members of the committee) indicated that they would consider nominating their own ticket for president, hoping to nominate Follette. The bolting faction of 48ers had considered the Farmer-Labor platform to be too radical. The rump faction of the Committee of 48 adopted rules of how they could reconvene to choose a nominee at a later date, before adjourning their meeting in Chicago.

=== Platform planks ===
==== Americanization plank ====
The platform's plank on "Americanization" demanded:

- Protections of the right of free speech.
- Amnesty for political prisoners.
- Repeal of espionage, sedition, and "criminal syndicalist" statutes.
- Retention elections and recall elections for all federal judges
- Equal suffrage (voting rights) for all

==== Foreign policy plank ====
The platform's foreign policy plank demanded:

- Withdrawal from participation in aspects of the Treaty of Versailles which the plank argued had reducing the losers of World War I to economic or political subjugation
- Recognition of the independence of the Republic of Ireland
- Regonition of the "new Russian government" (the Soviet government)
- Abolition of secret treaties
- An end to United States "dictatorship" over The Philippines, Cuba, Guam, Hawaii, and Puerto Rico
- Support for a "league of free peoples"

==== Democratic control of industries plank ====
- Democratic control of industries
- "right of labor for an increasing share in the responsibilities and management of industry"

==== Public ownership of utilities and resources plank ====
The platform included a plank urging the public ownership of all utilities and natural resources. The plank also demanded the immediate repeal of the Esch–Cummins Act (a law relating to railroads).

==== Favorable laws for farmers plank ====
A plank in the platform called for favorable laws for farmers. This plank demanded:

- establishment of public markets
- extension of the federal farm loan system
- organization of state and national services to better direct those navigating farm programs
- creation of new farmers' benefit organizations that "actually will help"

==== Government economy plank ====
A plank of the platform demanded the creation of a government economy, replacing "extravagance that has run riot under the present administration". The plank criticized the existing system in the country as having "created one war millionaire for every three American soldiers killed in France [in World War I]"

The plank also demanded that war-created wealth be taxed, in order to shift the nation's tax burden off of the country's poor. The platform also opposed consumption taxes, and proposed a steeply graduated scheme be applied to income taxes collected for federal revenue. It also called for steep graduated schemes to be applied to property taxes and inheritance taxes collected by state and local governments.

==== Cost of living reduction plank ====
A plank called for the cost of living to be reduced through the stabilization of American currency. The platform also urged for the federal government to take control over the meat packing industry. It also called for the federal government to enforce existing laws against profiteering, urging it to "especially" go after "the big ones".

==== Justice for soldiers of World War I plank ====
The platform included a plank supporting "justice to soldiers of the world war as a matter of right and not just of charity. It made a recommendation for the government to imbrues them an amount of money "sufficient to make their war pay not less than their peace-time earnings."

==== Labor bill of rights plank ====
The platform included a plank calling for a labor bill of rights. The plank advocated for:

- unqualified right of all workers (including government workers) to take strike actions
- freedom against compulsory arbitration
- a maximum standard 8-hour workday and 44-hour workweek
- old age unemployment payments (retirement payments)
- workmen's compensation to insure workers against instances of injury and disease
- abolition of child labor (for those under 16 years of age)
- proection of women in industry with equal pay for equal work
- abolition of private detective agencies used by employers to suppress strikes
- banning the interstate commerce of products produced by penal labor

==== Education plank ====
An education plank was proposed by E.D. MacDougal of Kansas, and the convention voted to add it as an amendment to the platform.

=== Resolutions adopted ===
Among the resolutions adopted was a resolution regarding the standard of wages of post office employees. Another was adopted urging voting rights for migrant workers. Resolutions were also adopted recognizing the jailed Eugene V. Debs and Jim Larkin as martyrs to the cause of democracy, calling for their early release.

== Selection of party name ==
After the adoption of the party platform, the evening session on July focused on three important matters: choosing an official name for the party, the nomination for president, the nomination for vice president. Many party names were suggested including "American Party", "People's Party", "Columbia" party, "United Party of Labor", "Farmers and Liberals", and "Labor Party". However, Farmer–Labor Party ultimately received near-unanimous support.

== Notable speeches ==
=== John Fitzpatrick's welcoming speech ===
John Fitzpatrick delivered a welcoming speech to the convention that was one of the more notable speeches of the convention. The welcoming speech has often been characterized as having been the convention's keynote address.

Fitzpatrick declared that, "the day would come when working people of the United States would get together and do a job such as the workers of Russia have done." In response to this a delegate in the crowd chanted "Three cheers for Soviet Russia, a request which others in the convention crowd accordingly honored.

Fitzpatrick hailed the Labor Party's purpose and its existing platform adopted at its November organizating convention. He remarked,

For years and years labor has followed the old routine of appealing to existing political parties. We have hone to them with our programs, making no difference whether the Democratic or Republican Party was in power, and have come away with our promises; only to see those promises broken and shattered.
So now we are through. We have gotten our own people together. We have tried to say, if words have meaning, that this program of ours was big and broad enough for every man and woman who does useful work with hand or brain to stand upon –though big business has pervered our statement in an attempt to show it is wholly a proposition for organized labor. There are other groups here in Chicago now, and I can tell you we are all agreed; we have all got the same program. There isn't anything sufficient to prevent the hand and brain workers of the United States from taking the government out of the hands of –not Americans but international pirates–and do it now.

Fitzpatrick's speech also lambasted the platform of the 1920 Republican National Convention, held earlier that year in Chicago.

=== Frank J. Esper ===
In remarks to the opening session of the convention, Frank J. Esper (secretary of the national party) remarked,

We must in the future send farmers, railroad men, miners, mechanists, molders, etc. to Congress. Then and only then will we have a government of the people, for the people, and by the people.

Esper characterized the party as being composed of, "Political organi-brain and hand who have been scattered as helpless hinories in the old parties under the leadership of confidence in big business," and argued it was,

Necessary for workers to continue the building of this great political organization so as to wrest the industrial power from the Wall Street pirates and return the political and industrial government to its rightful owners–the American people.

=== James Walker's acceptance speech as chairman ===
In his acceptance speech after being elected permanent chairman of the convention, James Walker delivered a speech in which he assailed that year's Democratic and Republican conventions, characterizing the two major parties as representing the "steel trust and profiteering merchants".

=== James Duncan's vice chair acceptance speech ===
In his vice chair acceptance speech, James Duncan called for all radical and liberal groups to join as one party. He urged for all to stand for good causes even when faced with the threat of being imprisoned, remarking,

If Abe Lincoln were here today, he would be in jail. A good American will take all the chances that Abe Lincoln would if he were here. Let all the good people go to jail, not just a few of them.

=== Tarak Nath Das ===
Tarak Nath Das delivered the final address of the first general session of the convention. The address touched on the subject of Colonial India's status under the imperial policies of Great Britain. He urged for the convention to support Indian independence movement. His proposal was then referred to the resolutions committee without any recommendation.

=== Katherine McCullough ===
In her speech, Katherine McCullough urged the party to write a platform adopting what she highlighted to be women's causes:

- Adequate appropriations for the Children's Bureau
- Ban on child labor
- Federal aid for maternity care and infant care
- Federal aid for education
- Federal spending for the elimination of social diseases
- Federal regulation of advertising and food to prevent excess profiteering
- Citizen rights of married women on an equal basis with men

=== Robert M. Buck's speech endorsing the majority report ===
Robert M. Buck led the platform committee's effort to secure the passage of its majority report. In his remarks defending and endorsing the majority report of the platform committee, Robert M. Buck declared,

There is no such thing as absolutism in expediency, but the question is where to stop compromising merely to get votes. The 3 members of the Committee of Forty-Eight who presented the minority report represented themselves, not the Committee of Forty-Eight.

The job of this platform is not to elect a President in 1920. It is to build the foundation of a party which will grow and free the people of the United States. We have no use for a liberal party now. The workers, both of hand and brain, are tired of wishy-washy pronouncements on political subjects. What we need is a radical party.

We compromised with the minority members of the committee to the extent of taking out of the platform the control of the railroads under the Plumb Plan. We substituted for nationalization of mines a term which the workers understood, government ownership with democratic control. We gave up the capital levy and a plank denouncing capitalist sabotage of production. Finally, we came to a point where we had to stop compromising. Then the compromising stopped.
