= George W. Dilling =

American politician

George Dilling
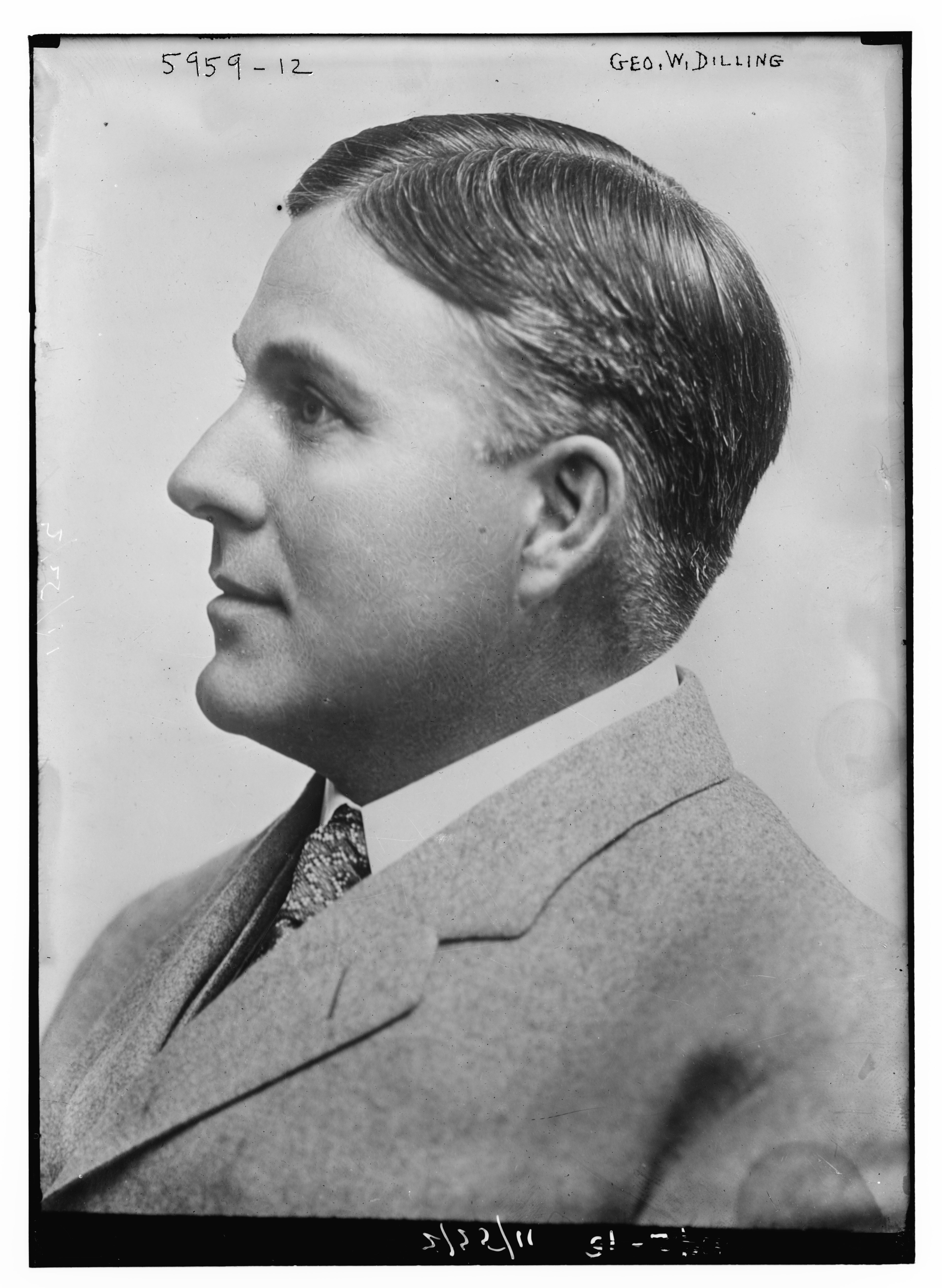

28th Mayor of Seattle
- In office February 11, 1911 – March 18, 1912
- Preceded by: Hiram C. Gill
- Succeeded by: George F. Cotterill

Member of the Washington House of Representatives
- In office 1903–1905

Personal details
- Born: 1869 Urbana, Illinois
- Died: September 14, 1951 (aged 81–82) Seattle, Washington
- Party: Republican
- Relations: John H. Nagle (uncle)
- Children: 2 daughters
- Occupation: Real estate investor

George W. Dilling (1869 – September 14, 1951) was an American businessman and politician. He served as mayor of Seattle, Washington, from 1911 to 1912, and was also elected to the Washington State Legislature.

Dilling was born on his parents' farm near Urbana, Illinois in 1869, leaving at the age of 14 to manage his own 100-acre (40 ha) farm. He moved on to selling shoes at a retail store and arrived in Seattle in 1898 to handle the estate of his uncle, John H. Nagle. Dilling's real estate investments in Seattle prospered during the Klondike Gold Rush, making him among the wealthiest men in the city.

Dilling entered politics in 1902, being elected to the Washington House of Representatives as a member of the Republican Party. He ran for mayor in 1910, as a Progressive reformer, but was defeated in the primary by Hiram C. Gill and William Hickman Moore. Gill went on to be elected mayor, but was recalled in a special election on February 7, 1911. Dilling was elected by a large margin, carried by the first female electorate in the city's history and the support of the Public Welfare League, and began sweeping reforms to undo many of Gill's controversial decisions.

Dilling served out the rest of Gill's term and declined to run for re-election in March 1912, endorsing George F. Cotterill. After his tenure as mayor, Dilling moved to California to continue his real estate business. He returned to Seattle in 1928 as head of the Economic Investing Corporation. He died on September 14, 1951, at the age of 82, a year after suffering from a stroke.

Dilling Way, a one-block street near City Hall Park and the King County Courthouse in Pioneer Square, is named in the mayor's honor.
