= 1920 United States Senate election in Washington =

- November 2, 1920
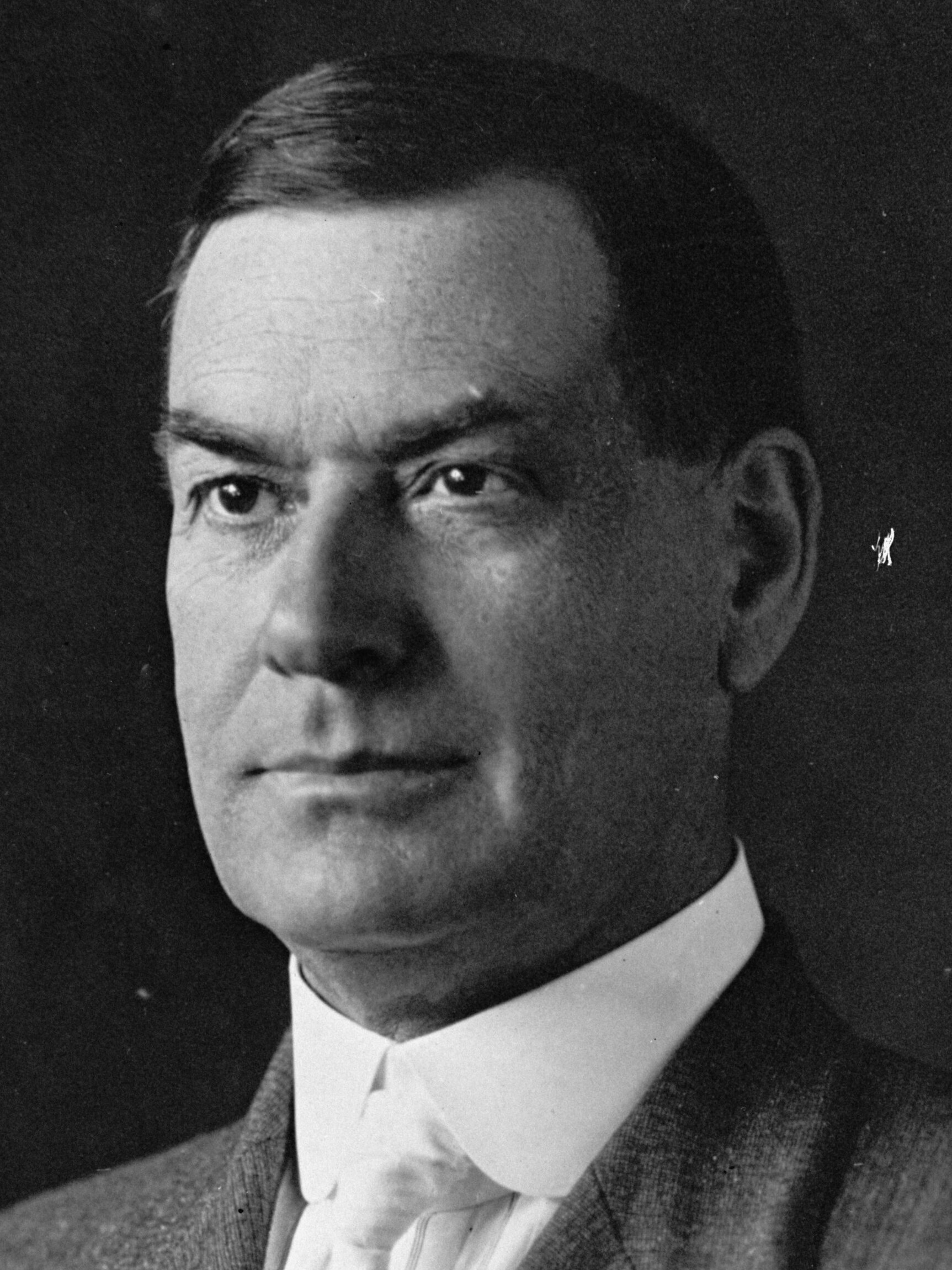

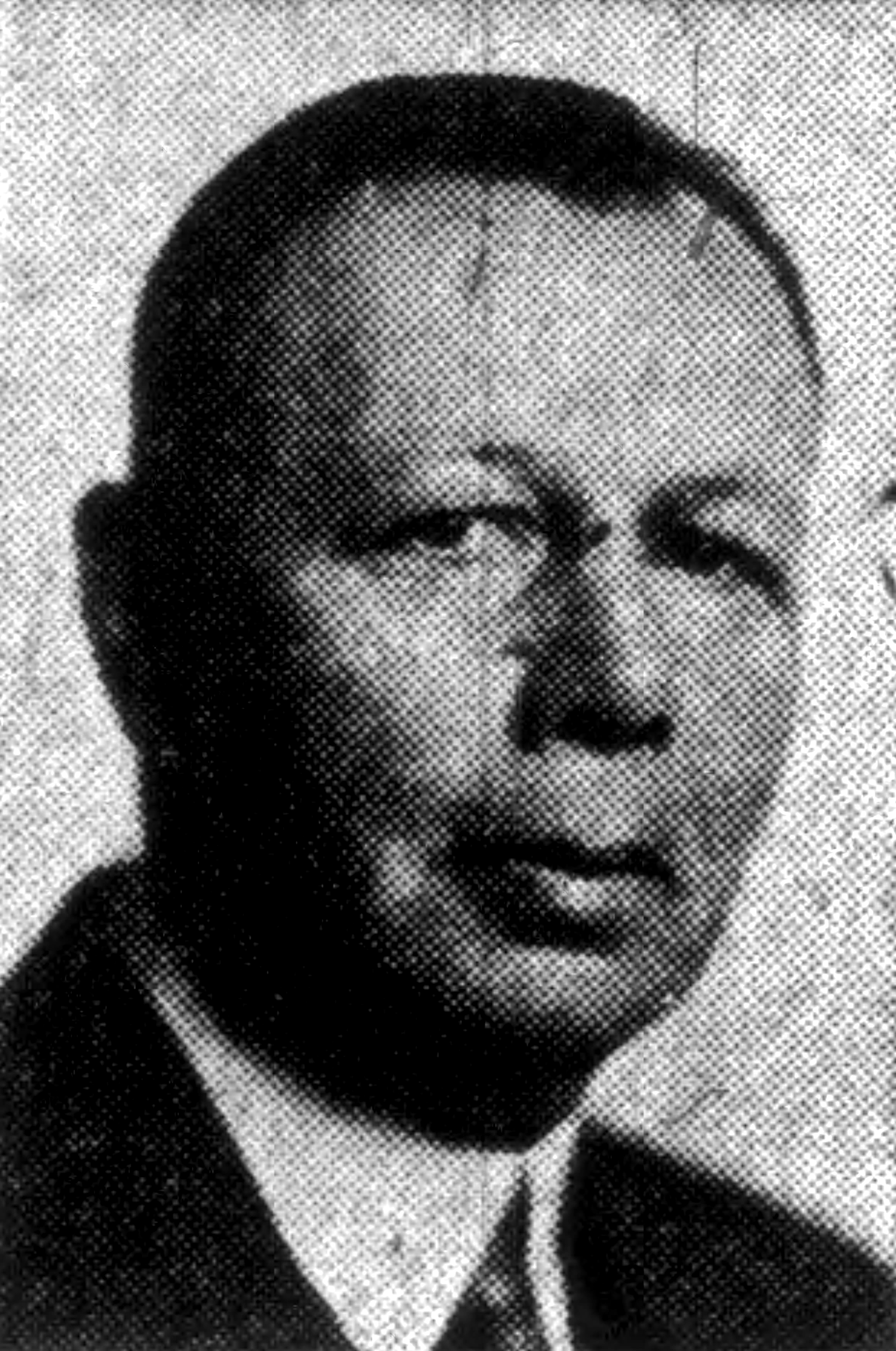

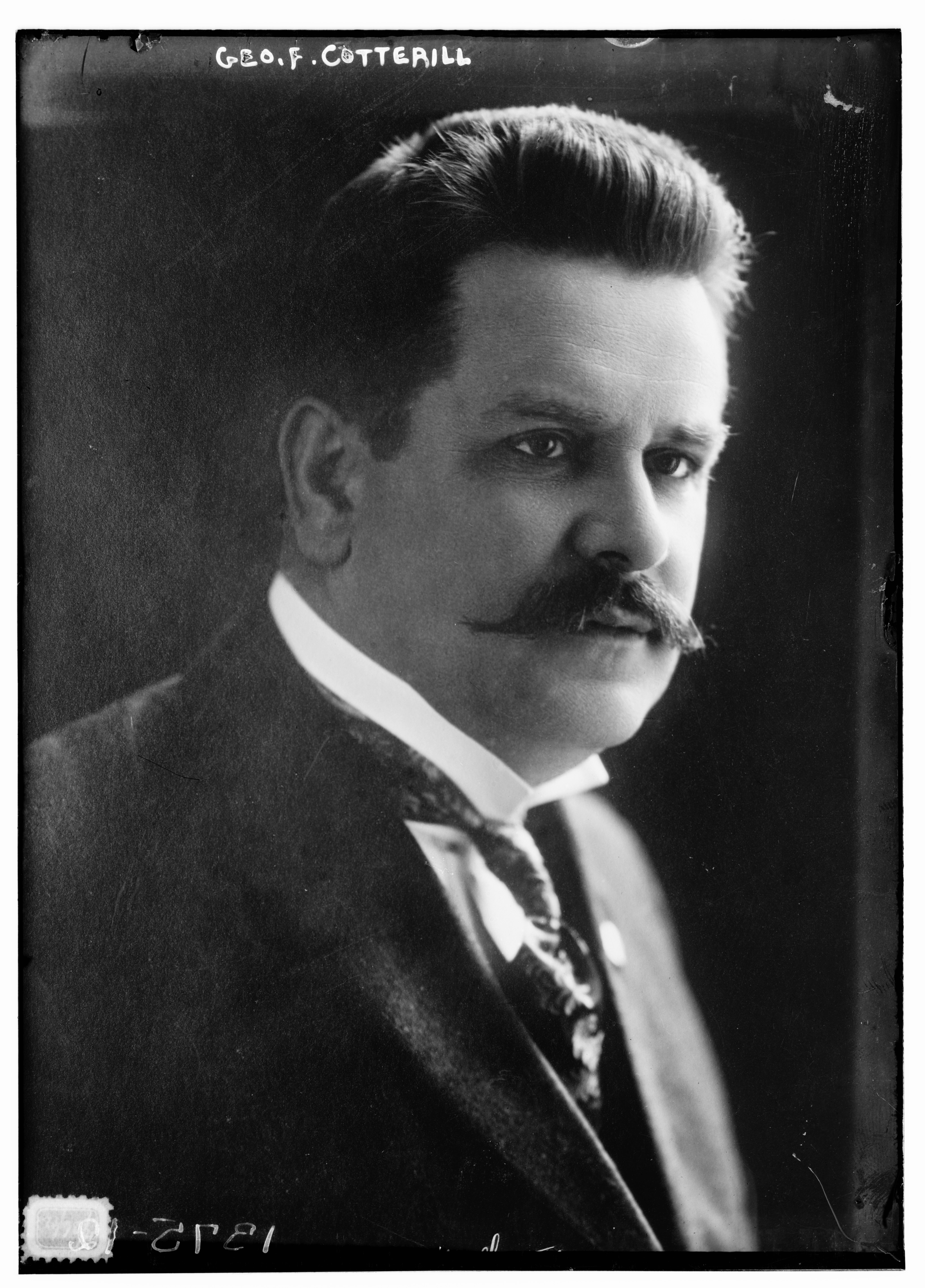
Nominee	Wesley L. Jones	Clemens J. France	George F. Cotterill
Party	Republican	Farmer–Labor	Democratic
Popular vote	164,130	99,309	68,488
Percentage	56.40%	25.80%	17.80%
- County results Jones: 30–40% 40–50% 50–60% 60–70%
U.S. senator before election
Wesley Livsey Jones
Republican
Elected U.S. Senator
Wesley Livsey Jones
Republican

The 1920 United States Senate election in Washington was held on November 2, 1920. Incumbent Republican U.S. Senator Wesley Livsey Jones was re-elected to a third term in office over Farmer-Labor nominee Clemens J. France and former Seattle mayor George F. Cotterill.

== Blanket primary ==
=== Candidates ===
==== Democratic ====
- George F. Cotterill, former Mayor of Seattle

==== Republican ====
- Frank Erickson
- Forest L. Hudson
- W.M. Inglis
- Wesley Livsey Jones, incumbent Senator since 1909

=== Results ===
1920 U.S. Senate blanket primary
Party	Candidate	Votes	%
Republican	Wesley Livsey Jones (incumbent)	102,852	49.87%
Republican	W.M. Inglis	41,765	20.25%
Republican	Forest L. Hudson	28,436	13.79%
Democratic	George F. Cotterill	20,004	9.70%
Republican	Frank Erickson	13,197	6.40%
Total votes		206,254	100.00%

== General election ==
=== Candidates ===
- George F. Cotterill, former Mayor of Seattle (Democratic)
- Clemens J. France, former president of the Municipal League of Seattle and brother of U.S. Senator from Maryland Joseph I. France (Farmer-Labor)
- Wesley Livsey Jones, incumbent U.S. Senator since 1908 (Republican)

=== Results ===
1920 United States Senate election in Washington
Party	Candidate	Votes	%	±%
Republican	Wesley Livsey Jones (incumbent)	217,069	56.40%	▲18.61
Farmer–Labor	Clemens J. France	99,309	25.80%	N/A
Democratic	George F. Cotterill	68,488	17.80%	▼8.77
Total votes		384,866	100.00%	
Republican hold		Swing		

== See also ==
- 1920 United States Senate elections
