= Nockels =

Nockels is a surname. Notable people with the surname include:

- Christy Nockels (born 1973), American singer-songwriter of contemporary Christian music, wife of Nathan
- Edward Nockels (1869-1937), American electrician and trade unionist
- Nathan Nockels (born 1973), American Christian musician and worship leader, husband of Christy
