= Adella M. Parker =

American politician, suffragist, lawyer, journalist, botanist and botanical collector

Member of the Washington House of Representatives from the District 37 district
- In office 1935–1937

Personal details
- Born: February 1, 1870 Whitehall, Michigan
- Died: April 8, 1956 (aged 86) Seattle, Washington
- Party: Democratic
- Spouse: Charles Enoch Allen Bennett (m. 1921; died 1929)
- Education: University of Washington School of Law

Adella M. Parker (variously spelled as Adele Parker, Adele Parker-Bennett, or Adela Parker) (1870 – April 8, 1956) was an American suffragist, politician, lawyer, journalist, and teacher who lived in Seattle, Washington. She was a state representative for District 37 in Washington from 1935 to 1937. In 1909, she was the president of the Washington College League.

== Early life and education ==
Parker was born in Whitehall, Michigan in 1870. She moved with her parents to Seattle. Parker went to law school at the University of Washington, from which she graduated in 1903 as the only woman in the class. She completed graduate work at the West Virginia University and the University of Wisconsin.

== Career ==
In addition to practicing law, Parker taught political economics and government at Broadway High School. She was the executive secretary of the Seattle High School Teachers' League from 1931 to 1934. She fought for years trying to find a legislation that wouldn't affect women. She always fought hard for women with multiple speeches and conventions.

Parker was an advocate for municipal good government and for women's suffrage. She was a member of the Women's Good Government League in Seattle and president of the Women's Suffrage League. She drafted a recall law and led a campaign for it to be adopted by Seattle city council as a charter amendment, eventually leading to the recall of Mayor Hiram Gill, who was accused of condoning gambling. It was noted by the media that Parker drafted the law and had it adopted before women acquired the right to vote.

Parker married Charles Enoch Allen Bennett in 1921; the couple honeymooned in Siberia. From 1922 to 1923, Parker served as a Moscow correspondent for the International News Service. Bennett died in 1929.

From 1935 to 1937, Parker represented District 37, comprising King County, in the Washington State House of Representatives. She was a member of the Democratic Party.

== Death ==
Parker died on April 8, 1956, after a short illness.
