= Ralph Horr =

American politician

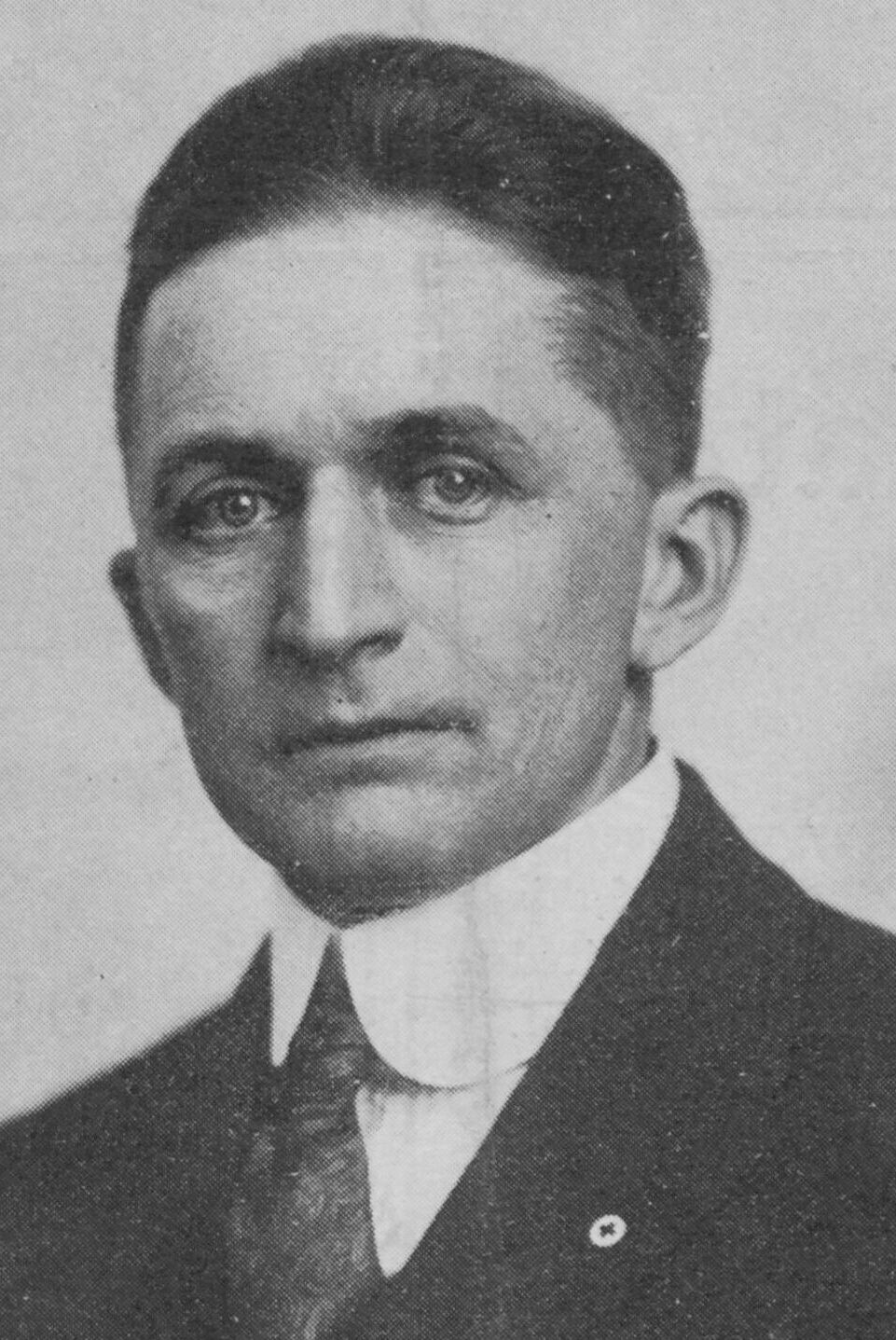

Member of the U.S. House of Representatives from Washington's 1st district
- In office March 4, 1931 – March 3, 1933
- Preceded by: John Franklin Miller
- Succeeded by: Marion Zioncheck

Personal details
- Born: Ralph Ashley Horr; August 12, 1884 Saybrook, Illinois, U.S.
- Died: January 26, 1960 (aged 75) Seattle, Washington, U.S.
- Party: Republican
- Education: University of Illinois; University of Washington

Ralph Ashley Horr (August 12, 1884 – January 26, 1960) was an American politician who served as a member of the United States House of Representatives from 1931 to 1933. He represented Washington's 1st congressional district as a Republican.

A graduate of the University of Illinois and of University of Washington School of Law, Horr ran unsuccessfully for mayor of Seattle, Washington in 1918 as a member of the Republican Party.

Horr won the Republican party's nomination for the congressional seat then held by long-serving Republican John Franklin Miller in 1930. He was defeated two years later for renomination by Miller, who went on to lose the general election to Democrat Marion Zioncheck. Horr later lost races for United States Senate in 1934, for governor of Washington in 1936, and for mayor of Seattle in 1948.

U.S. House of Representatives
Preceded by John Franklin Miller	Member of the U.S. House of Representatives from Washington's 1st congressional district 1931-1933	Succeeded by Marion Zioncheck
