= Jeremiah A. O'Leary =

Irish-American lawyer, journalist and politician

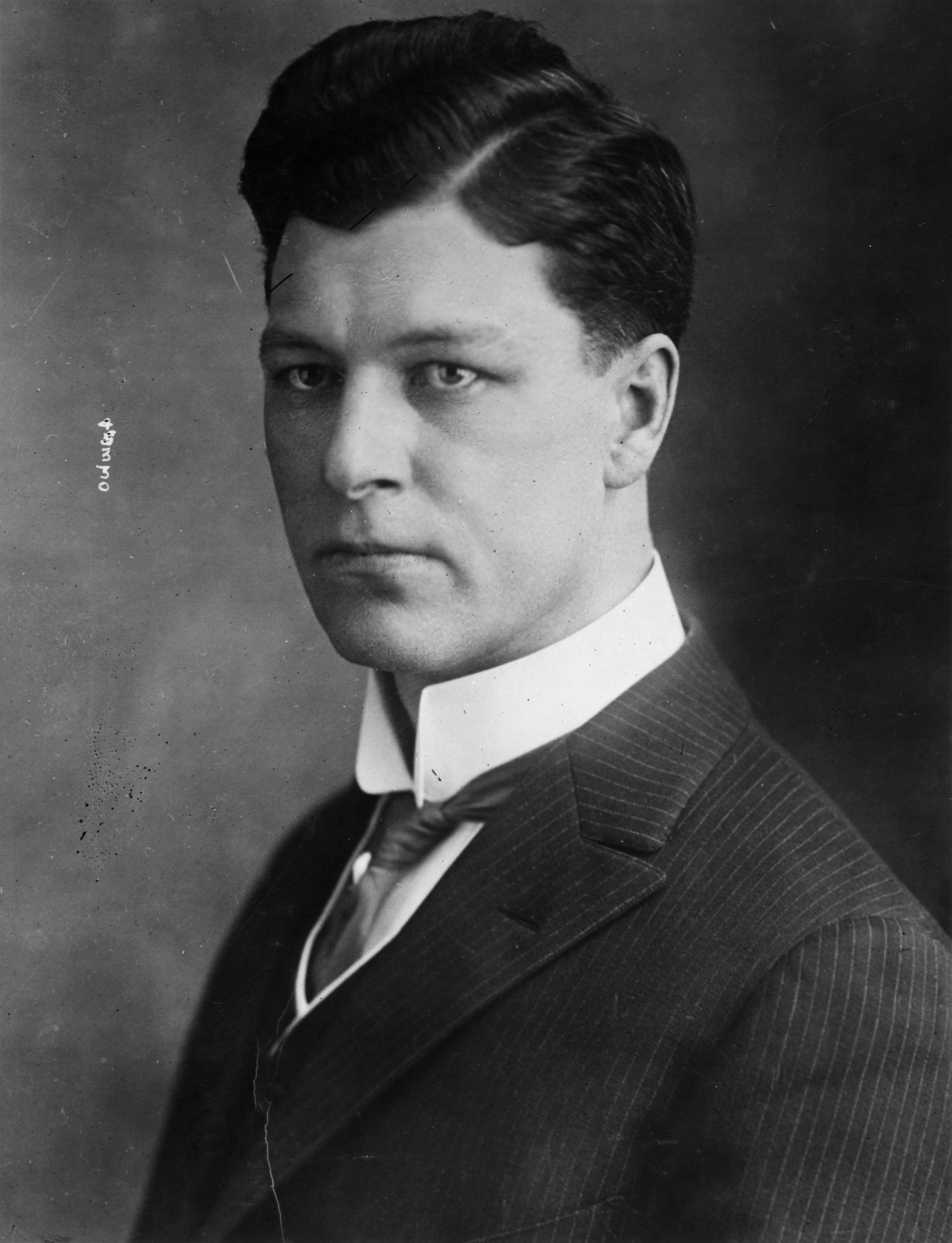
- O'Leary in 1918
- Born: July 24, 1881; Glens Falls, New York, U.S.
- Died: March 13, 1972 (aged 90); New York City, New York, U.S.
- Occupations: Lawyer, journalist, politician
- Political party: Farmer–Labor
- Other political affiliations: Sinn Féin
- Spouse: Gertrude E. Whalen (m. 1909, died)
- Children: 5

Jeremiah Aloysius O'Leary (July 24, 1881 – March 13, 1972) was an Irish-American lawyer, journalist and politician who was arrested and charged with treason under the Espionage Act during World War I.

Long active in Irish nationalist politics, O'Leary was indicted by a grand jury in 1917 and charged with inciting mutiny in the United States Armed Forces. He fled the state and spent several months as a fugitive, but was captured and returned to New York. After a nine-month trial, O'Leary was acquitted on all but one of the charges (the last of which hung the jury) and was released. Later indictments against him were dismissed.

== Career ==
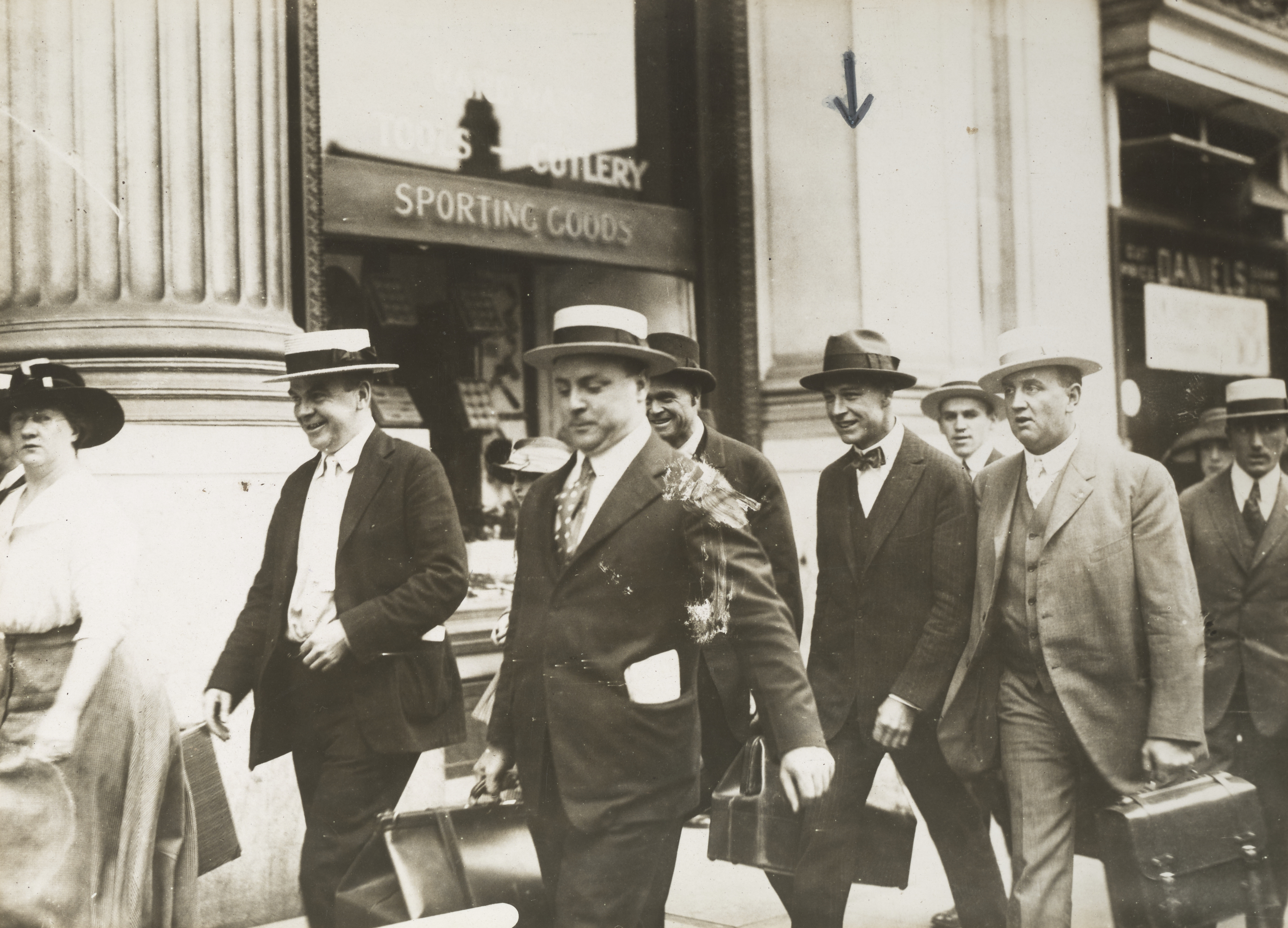
O'Leary is arrested in New York, June 1, 1918

O'Leary founded the American Truth Society in 1912, an anti-British organization that sought to prevent an Anglo-American alliance and drew support primarily from the Irish and German diaspora. During the 1916 presidential election, O'Leary sent president Woodrow Wilson a telegram attacking him for his pro-British foreign policy, claiming it would cost him the election. Wilson responded as follows:

I would feel deeply mortified to have you or anybody like you vote for me. Since you have access to many disloyal Americans and I have not I will ask you to convey this message to them.

O'Leary was chairman of the Larkin Amnesty Committee which sought a pardon for Jim Larkin from the Governor. In 1920, O'Leary ran for Congress in New York's 18th congressional district, challenging incumbent Democrat John F. Carew. Running as a Farmer–Laborite, O'Leary campaigned on the release of all political prisoners, opposition to the League of Nations, U.S. recognition of the revolutionary governments in Ireland and Russia, and public ownership of mines. Although early returns from the New-York Tribune showed O'Leary in the lead, he ultimately came in third place with just over 25% of the vote.

Later in life, O'Leary campaigned for the release of Tom Mooney. In 1933, he was appointed to the Triborough Bridge Authority by mayor John P. O'Brien.

== Works ==
- The Fable of John Bull and Uncle Sam (c. 1916). New York: American Truth Society.
- My Political Trial and Experiences (1919). New York: Jefferson Publishing Co.
