= George F. Cotterill =

American mayor (1865–1958)

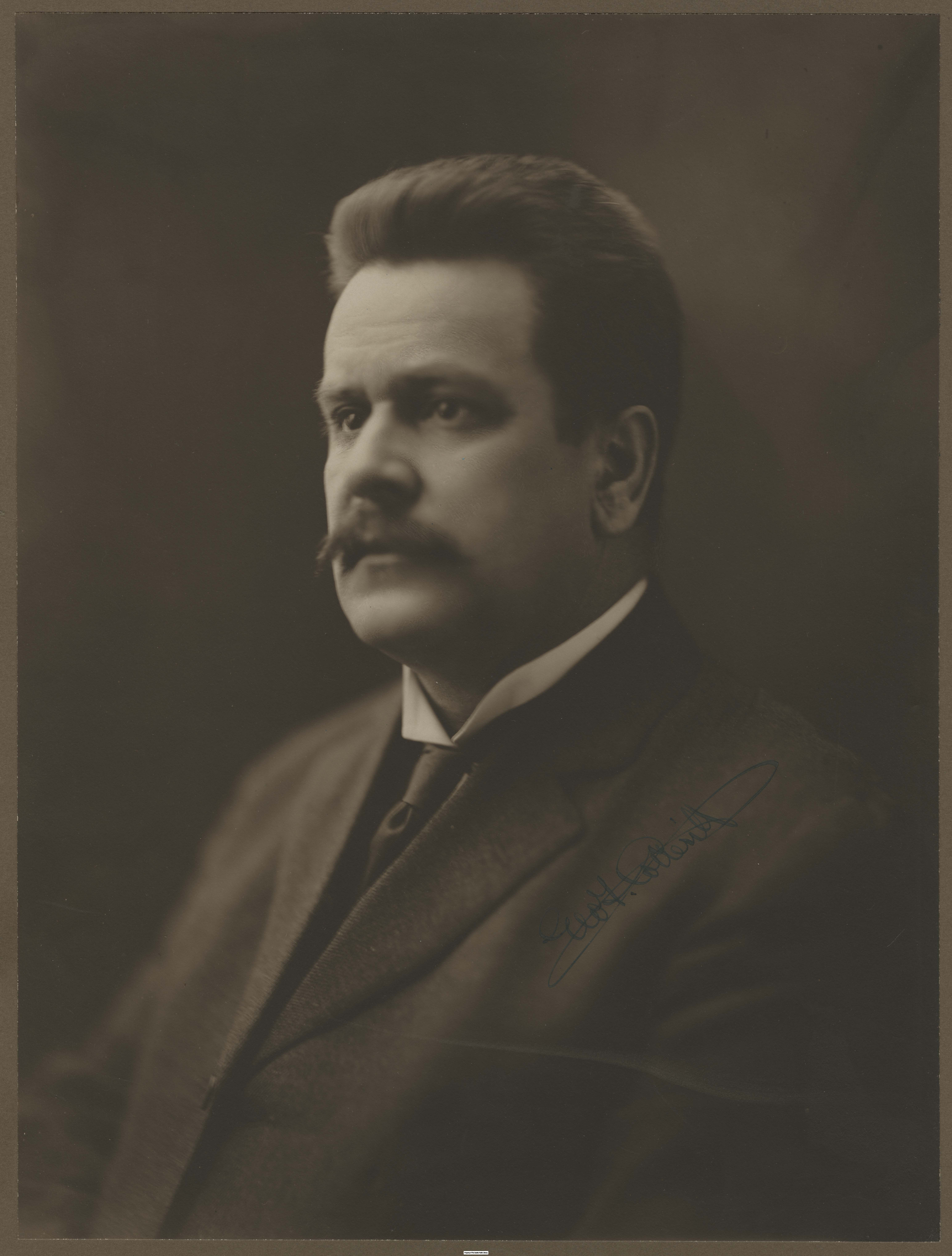
- Cotterill c. 1912

29th Mayor of Seattle
- In office March 18, 1912 – March 16, 1914
- Preceded by: George W. Dilling
- Succeeded by: Hiram Gill

Member of the Washington Senate from the 36th district
- In office 1907–1911
- Preceded by: Richard M. Kinnear
- Succeeded by: Daniel Landon

Personal details
- Born: November 18, 1865 Oxford, United Kingdom
- Died: October 13, 1958 (aged 92) Seattle, Washington, U.S.
- Party: Republican (before 1900); Democratic (after 1900)

George Fletcher Cotterill (November 18, 1865 – October 13, 1958) was an American civil servant and politician. His public career in Seattle and the state of Washington lasted over 40 years; Cotterill was a Georgist progressive. He was an advocate of woman suffrage, prohibition, land value tax, municipalisation of port facilities and utilities, and the development of public parks.

== Youth and early career ==
Born in Oxford, England, Cotterill was the son of a gardener Robert Cotterill and his wife Alice. The family immigrated to the United States in May 1872, when he was six, arriving in Boston before settling on a farm in Montclair, New Jersey. After graduating from high school in Montclair—at the young age of 15 and as class valedictorian—he worked as a rod man on a railroad survey, while training to be a surveyor and engineer.

In 1883, he travelled to the Pacific Northwest with his father and brother. They had hoped to find work for the Northern Pacific Railroad, but by the time they arrived the project in question had been suspended. His father and brother headed back East in 1884. Cotterill stayed on and managed to obtain a job as a bookkeeper for the Moran Brothers shipyard in Seattle. Moran and Cotterill would each later serve the city as its mayor.

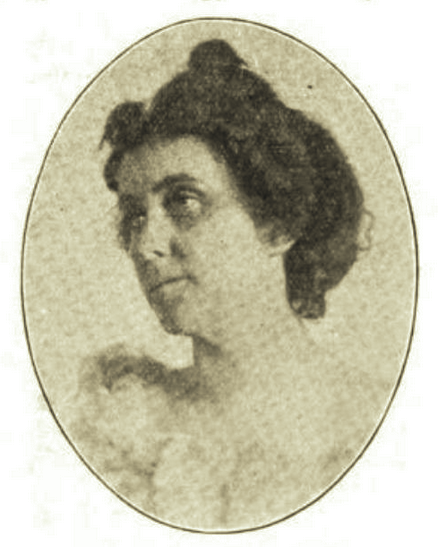
Cora R. Cotterill in 1902

He was not a bookkeeper for long. The growing town and the Washington Territory needed surveyors and engineers. Cotterill laid out the seating diagram for Frye Opera House (Seattle's premier theatre of its time), worked for the Columbia & Puget Sound Railway, the Seattle, Lake Shore & Eastern Railway, and eventually for the Northern Pacific when they resumed development in the region. He was involved with the coal mines in Gilman (now Issaquah, Washington) and Grand Ridge. He surveyed land in West Seattle (which at that time was not yet part of Seattle proper) and laid out the plan of the city of Sidney (later Port Orchard) in Kitsap County. Most importantly for his future career, though, he worked for City of Seattle Surveyor R. H. Thomson, both as a surveyor and in building the city's first sewers.

He married temperance worker Cora Rowena Gormley on 19 February 1890.

== Thomson and Cotterill ==
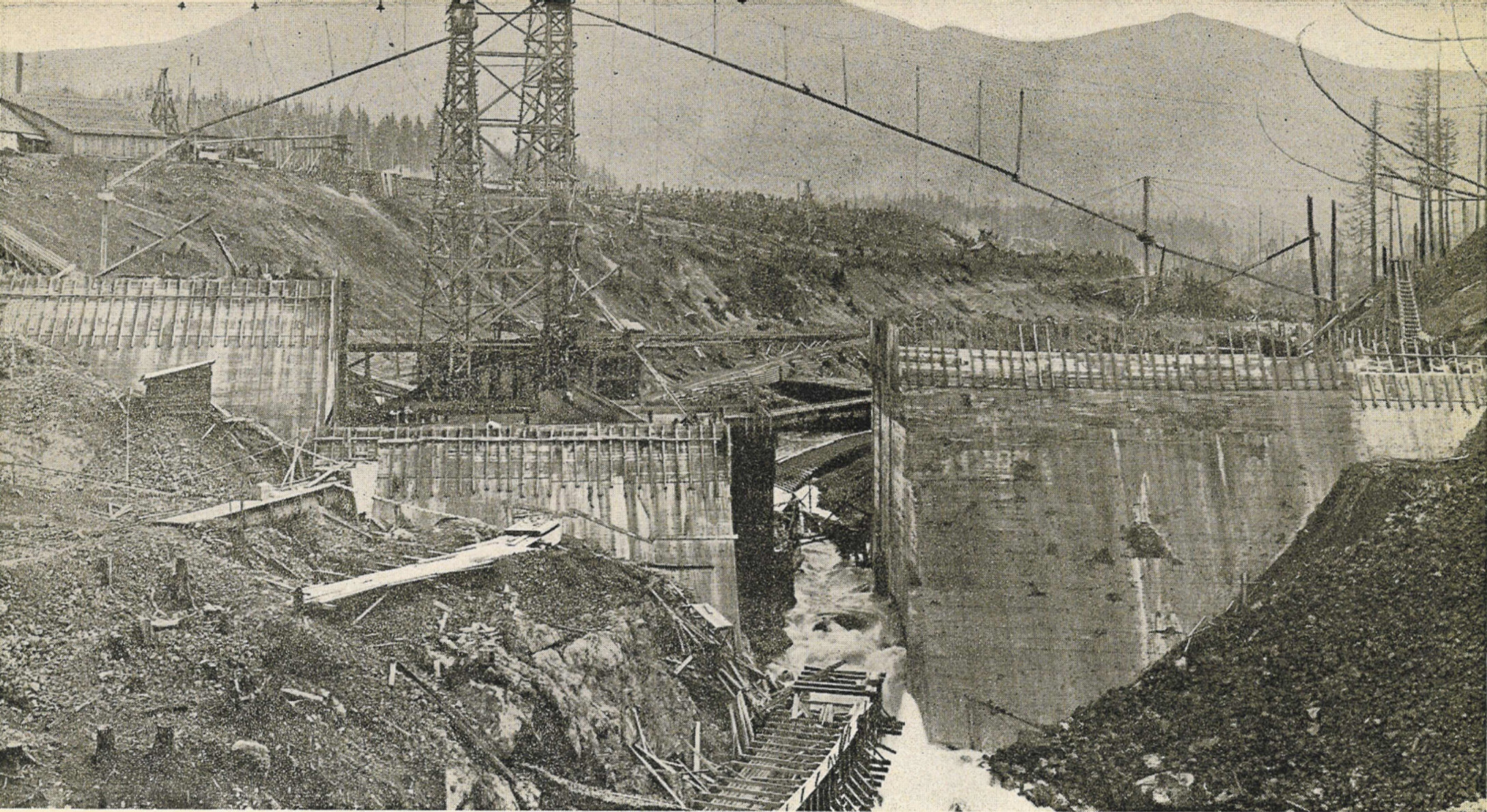
Cedar River Dam under construction, circa 1900

Thomson became City Engineer in 1892 and appointed Cotterill as an assistant. They developed the basis of what remains Seattle's main water supply over a century later (see Seattle Public Utilities), bringing in water from the Cedar River. The financial hurdles were almost as daunting as the technical difficulties. In an 8 July 1889 election, barely a month after the Great Seattle Fire (6 June 1889) Seattle's citizens had voted 1,875 to 51 to acquire and operate their own water system. However, the Panic of 1893 wrecked the city's finances. Cotterill devised the then-novel plan of borrowing money for the pipeline by pledging the receipts from the water to be delivered when the $1,250,000 system was completed. This brought Cotterill into electoral politics for the first time, supporting his own plan in an 1895 special election. The Klondike Gold Rush put Seattle on a sound economic footing and the 1901 completion of Cedar River Supply System No. 1 (active from 21 February 1901) gave the city a steady supply of clean water.

Other achievements by Thomson and Cotterill in this era included 25 miles of bicycle trails (later the basis of the city's Olmsted boulevard system) the filling of tideflats that compose much of today's SoDo and Industrial District south of Downtown Seattle, and the development of the plats that still determine the general plan of the piers on Seattle's Central Waterfront. Each pier is more or less a parallelogram. Most earlier piers, none of which survive, formed a perfect right angle to the shore, and the curvature of the shore meant that each pier was at a slightly different angle, causing potential for collisions. Their uniform northeast–southwest direction was prescribed by Thomson and Cotterill not only solved that problem but also spared freight trains from needing to make a sharp right angle.

== Politics ==
An increasingly prominent figure in the city, Cotterill was soon embroiled in matters unrelated to his technical skills (or even his financial skills) Gold Rush money had turned Seattle into a wide open city: brothels and casinos flourished, as did concomitant corruption. Cotterill had been a Republican, but in 1900 he supported populist Democrat William Jennings Bryan for president and ran for mayor of Seattle, nominally as a nonpartisan, but effectively as a Democrat. It was not the Democrats' year, and Cotterill lost (as he would also lose a Congressional race two years later). He resigned his city job and resumed private practice.

In 1906, he finally achieved electoral success as one of only three Democrats elected to the Washington State Senate, which then had 42 members. Crossing the aisle, he became the leader of progressive Republicans, and successfully built support for the direct primary law of 1907. As a legislator, he also backed the Lake Washington Ship Canal and helped preserve shorelines for the University of Washington and for city parks. He backed local option as a step toward the prohibition of alcohol and was also instrumental in passing the law that allowed formation of port districts. The workman's compensation law he helped to write became a national model.

Cotterill and Emma Smith DeVoe drafted a subtle amendment to re-enact women's suffrage in Washington, and their bill passed in 1909. The women's suffrage movement campaigned across the state for voters to approve it, and in 1910 women again achieved the right to vote in Washington. The U.S. did not grant women the right to vote until the 19th amendment passed in 1920.

Cotterill was the Democratic candidate for the United States Senate in 1908 and 1910, but lost both races.

== Mayor of Seattle ==
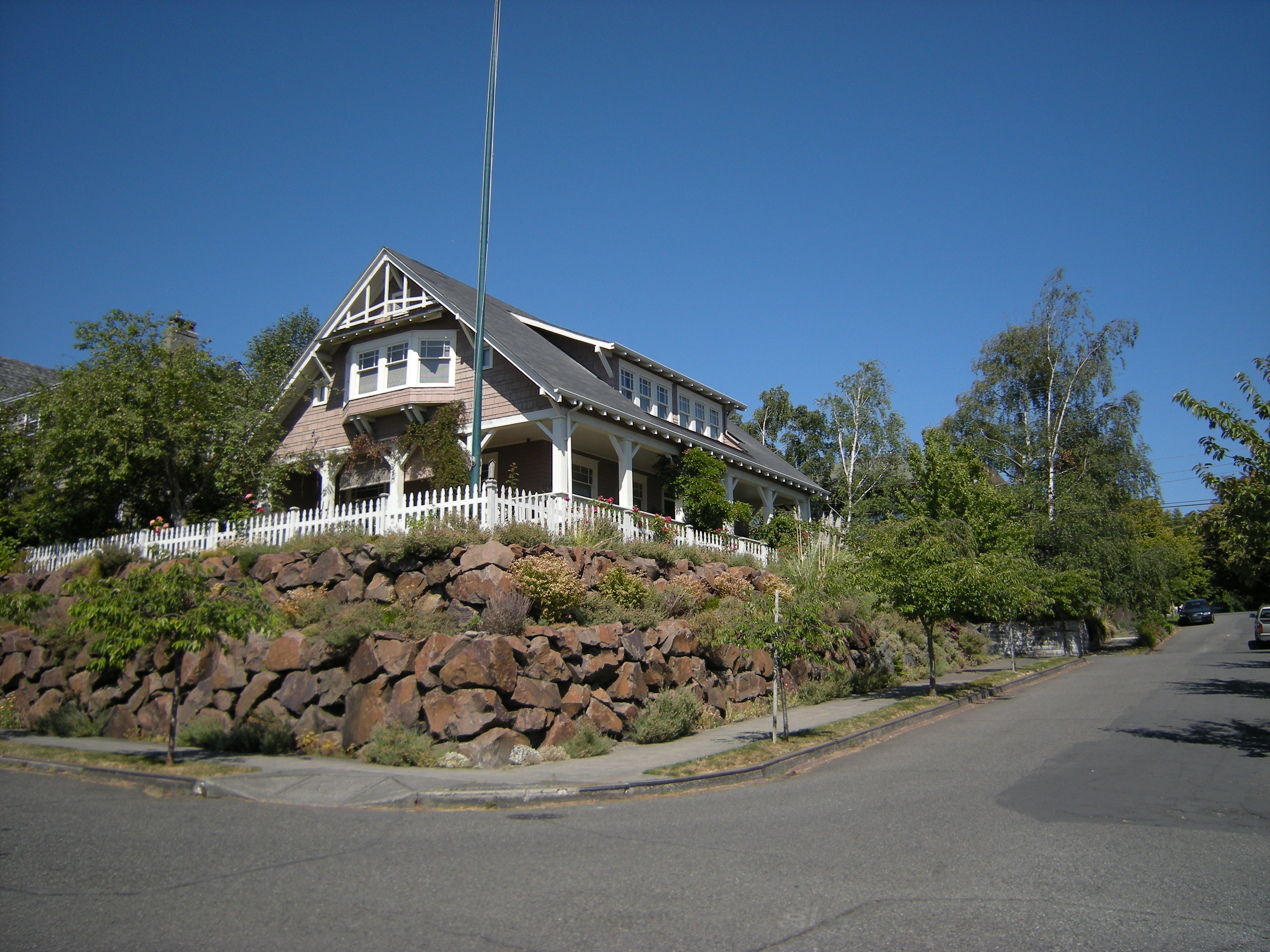
Cotterill House, 2501 Westview Drive W. on West Queen Anne Hill, Cotterill's home from 1910 to 1928, is now an official city landmark.

Hiram Gill ran successfully for the Seattle mayoralty in 1910 on "open city" platform, defeating real estate man George W. Dilling. Gill opposed municipal ownership of utilities, arguing not only for privatised transit, but for privatised waterworks, and opposing the then-young Seattle City Light electric utility. He was generally anti-tax and anti-union. Gill reinstalled police chief Charles "Wappy" Wappenstein, whom Gill's predecessor John F. Miller had dismissed as corrupt. Wappenstein promptly established a regime far more "open" than any that Gill had overtly advocated. Every prostitute in Seattle was expected to pay $10 a month to "Wappy", and the police department made sure they paid. Beacon Hill became home to a 500-room brothel with a 15-year lease from the city. It did not take long for the voters to get fed up, and Gill was recalled from office in 1911, though it would not be his last time as mayor. Dilling finished out Gill's term. Wappenstein eventually went to prison.

Gill ran for mayor again in March 1912, and Cotterill ran against him. Seattle Times publisher Alden J. Blethen ardently supported Gill, but Cotterill won. The election wasn't even close, and a third candidate, Socialist Hulet Wells, received nearly as many votes as Gill. Reformers, many of them with no party affiliation, formed the majority of the Seattle City Council. Theodore Roosevelt's "Bull Moose" candidacy carried the state in the presidential election later that year, though Roosevelt did not win the country.

Although in some ways his moment of triumph, Cotterill was by this time, in Roger Sales's words, riding "two horses… moving in different directions". His desire for municipal ownership of utilities and public control of ports allied him with labour and populism; his lifelong Prohibitionist views did not. The Prohibitionist movement was, by this time, aligning itself with issues that wanted small government on most other issues, because they had come to believe that big government inevitably meant corruption. Meanwhile, labour was moving farther left, toward socialism and even anarcho-syndicalism.

Prohibitionism and the temperance movement had always been at the centre of Cotterill's morality. His parents had been members of the United Kingdom Temperance Alliance. During his childhood in England, he attended the Band of Hope, an organisation for children's temperance education. His mother had formed the local chapter. He attended a convention of the International Order of Good Templars in 1897 and was involved with the Templars for the rest of his life, serving for a time as Grand Secretary of the Washington State division and later as Chief Templar of the national division. He was a member of the Anti-Saloon League and in 1909, was appointed by President Taft to represent the US at the International Congress against Alcoholism; in 1913 he was reappointed to this role by President Wilson.

As mayor, Cotterill instigated an anti-vice campaign that raised civil liberties issues, and he soon became embroiled in other issues, as well. There were thousands of vice-related warrantless arrests, and the crackdown on vice may simply have created new and different modes of police corruption.

At this time, Seattle had a big summer celebration known as Potlatch Days, the name deriving from the potlatch ceremonies of the indigenous peoples of the region. In summer 1913, during the Golden Potlach celebration, Blethen succeeded in stirring up already hot tempers and sparking a riot that destroyed the local offices of the Industrial Workers of the World and of the Socialist Party. Cotterill shut down the saloons, suspended all street meetings, and attempted to close the Seattle Times. In this last, he was stopped by a judge; he and police chief Claude Bannick nearly found themselves arrested. However, he survived a recall attempt instigated by Blethen.

That was hardly the last of the labour troubles Cotterill faced as mayor. Later that year, the Teamsters struck for union recognition and a closed shop. Cotterill attempted to remain neutral, which the employers viewed as support for the union.

== Later career ==
Rather than seek re-election as mayor, in 1914 Cotterill ran again for the United States Senate. Again, he lost. In 1916, he was appointed Chief Engineer of the state highway department. In 1922, he was elected to the first of four three-year terms on the Seattle Port Commission, after which he worked a variety of jobs, including working for the King County Assessor's Office until retiring at the age of 84.

Cotterill seems never to have given up hopes of resuming a career in electoral politics. He ran for governor in 1928 and for at least five various city and state offices between 1932 and 1951. His finances fared poorly in the Great Depression, which was part of the reason he worked into his 80s. Most likely, he would have worked even longer if the state had not adopted a mandatory retirement law for government employees over 70.

His wife Cora died on 26 February 1936, and he remarried to principal Katherine E. Owen on 18 November 1950.

Roughly a decade after his retirement, he died in a Seattle nursing home.

Party political offices
Preceded by William W. Black	Democratic nominee for U.S. Senator from Washington (Class 3); 1920	Succeeded by A. Scott Bullitt
Political offices
Preceded by George W. Dilling	Mayor of Seattle; 1912–1914	Succeeded by Hiram C. Gill
