= Hiram Gill =

American politician

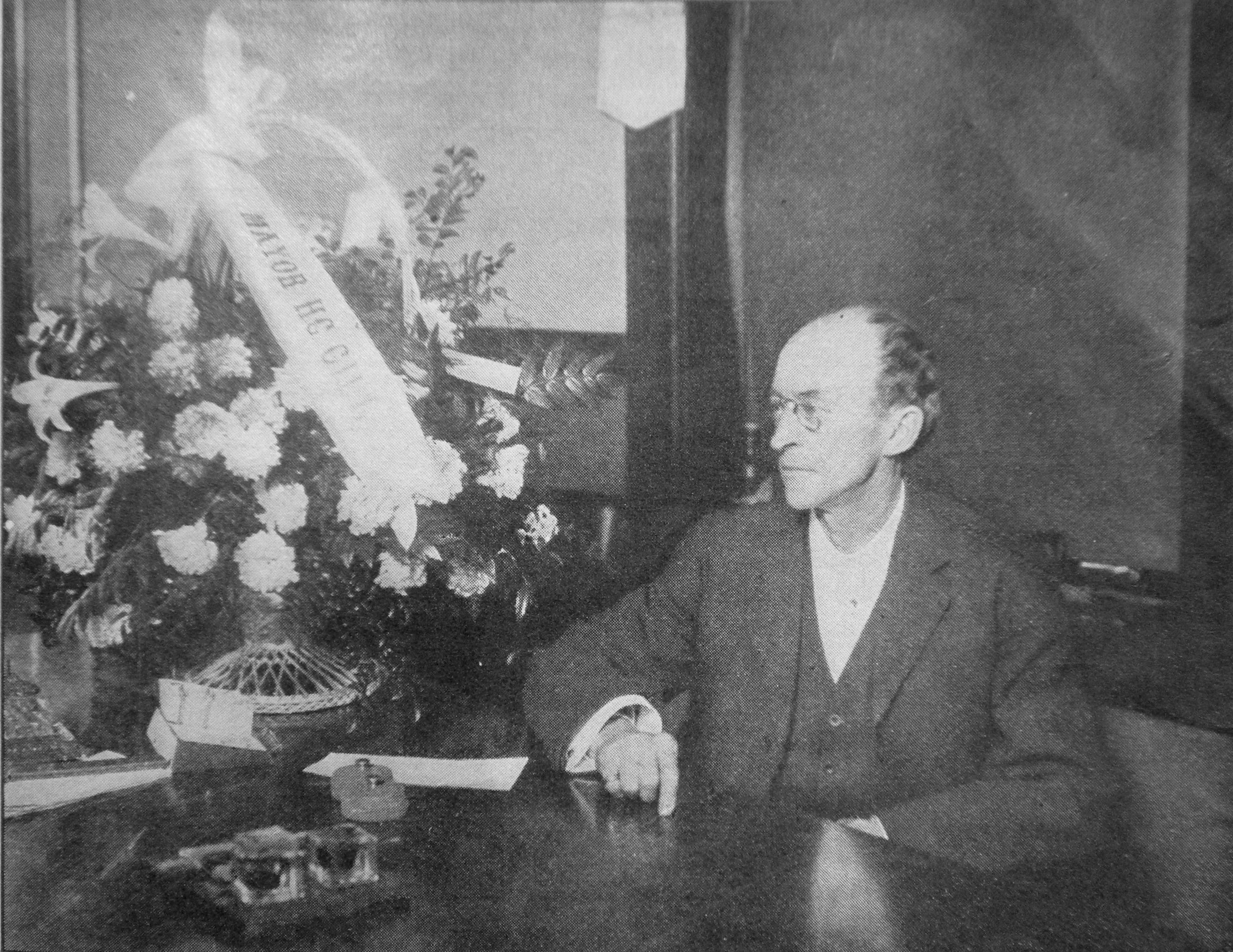
- Gill as Seattle mayor, c. 1911

27th Mayor of Seattle
- In office March 21, 1910 – February 11, 1911
- Preceded by: John F. Miller
- Succeeded by: George W. Dilling
- In office March 16, 1914 – March 18, 1918
- Preceded by: George F. Cotterill
- Succeeded by: Ole Hanson

Personal details
- Born: August 23, 1866 Watertown, Wisconsin
- Died: January 7, 1919 (aged 52) Seattle, Washington
- Party: Republican

Hiram C. Gill (August 23, 1866 – January 7, 1919) was an American lawyer and two-time Mayor of Seattle, Washington, identified with the "open city" politics that advocated toleration of prostitution, alcohol, and gambling.

== Rise ==
Gill was born in 1866 in Watertown, Wisconsin. His father, Charles R. Gill, a lawyer and Civil War commander, later served as Wisconsin's attorney general. In 1889 Gill graduated from the University of Wisconsin Law School and moved to Seattle, where he worked first as a waiter at a waterfront restaurant. That June, the Great Seattle Fire reconfigured Seattle. Gill soon became (as he had been during law school) a stenographer in a law firm, entering practice himself in 1892 and soon entering politics as a Republican. As a lawyer, he defended saloonkeepers and brothel owners. A petition to recall Gill, drafted by Adella Parker, began circulating on October 8, 1910; a sufficient number to force an election were turned in by December 20. Gill was the first U.S. mayor to undergo a recall election. He was elected to the city council in 1898, reelected in 1900, defeated in 1902, but elected again in 1904, after which he held onto his seat, serving three years as council president before running for mayor in 1910 on an "open town" platform.

== 1910 campaign ==
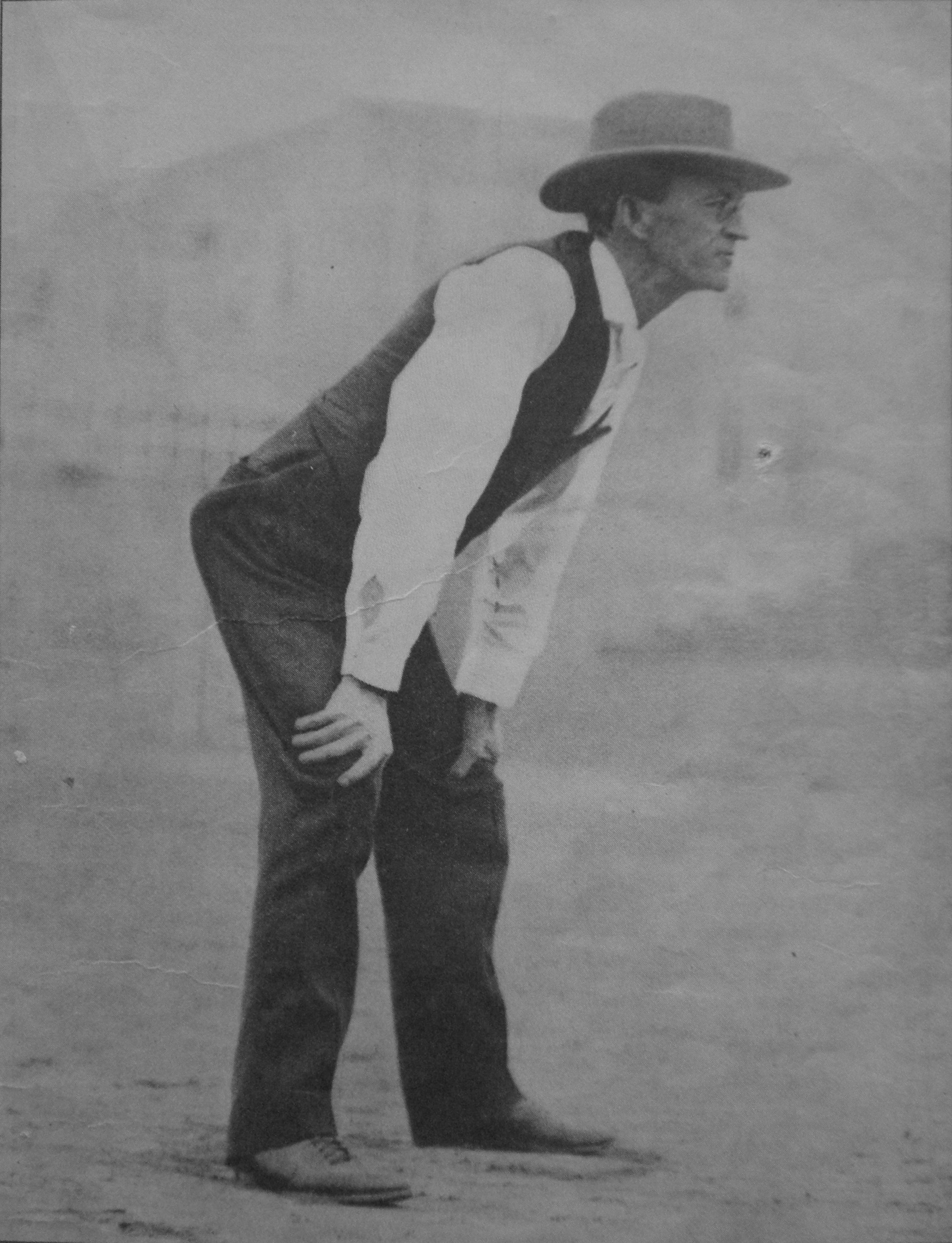
Hiram Gill umpiring baseball.

At that time, the great divide in Seattle politics was between "open town" and "closed town" factions. The town had risen to prosperity by "mining the miners" of the 1897 Klondike Gold Rush, and then became a player in the emerging Pacific trade. A prosperity based on miners and maritime trade inevitably carved out a large role for brothels, bars, and gambling dens. Open town advocates like Gill and Seattle Times publisher Alden J. Blethen argued for the economic benefits of an "open town" while trying to keep these "vices" mostly confined to the area below Yesler Way, a major east–west road through what is now known as Pioneer Square. One of the most prominent figures on the other side of the debate was Presbyterian minister Mark Matthews, who already in 1905 had faced off against Gill, accusing him of "condoning vice"; other opponents included other church groups, but also progressives, prohibitionists, and women's suffragists.

During the campaign Gill advocated a "restricted district" for prostitution. "Somewhere in this city, occupying about a hundredth of one per cent of its area, these unfortunates, whose lives are gone, most of them beyond recall, will go. They will go out of the resident districts and the apartment-houses and hotels of this city. They will stay out." And the "open town" issue was not simply about prostitution and gambling. "I want bands to play in Seattle," said Gill. "I want them to play on Sunday."

This was, of course, not the only issue in the campaign. Gill opposed municipal ownership of utilities, arguing not only for privatized transit, but for privatized waterworks, and opposing the then-young Seattle City Light electric utility. He was generally anti-tax and anti-union.

== First mayoralty ==
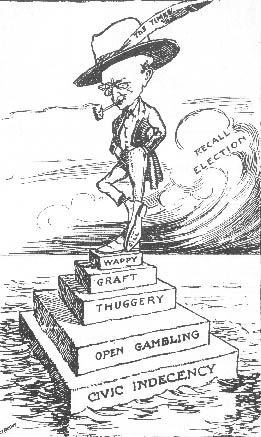
"Where Gill Proudly Stands", 1911 cartoon by "Hop" in the Seattle Post-Intelligencer

Gill and a Republican slate won the March 8, 1910 election. Opponents attributed the remarkably high turnout to the Republicans importing unemployed men, lodging them in vacant houses and apartments, and effectively buying their votes.

Gill promptly reinstalled as chief of police Charles "Wappy" Wappenstein, whom Gill's predecessor John F. Miller had dismissed as corrupt. Wappenstein promptly established a regime far more "open" than any that Gill had overtly advocated, and not just south of Yesler Way. "For the most part, the established population [of prostitutes and gamblers] still plied their vocations in the business and residential sections. The streets, the cafés, even the better class of hotels, were still crowded with prostitutes. The old conditions were as prevalent as before, and the segregated area was populated chiefly by new arrivals."

Every prostitute in Seattle was expected to pay $10 a month to "Wappy", and the police department made sure they paid. Beacon Hill became home to a 500-room brothel with a 15-year lease from the city. Gill fired Wappenstein, then brought him back.

=== Recall election ===
A petition to recall Gill, drafted by Adella Parker, began circulating on October 8, 1910; a sufficient number to force an election were turned in by December 20. Gill was the first U.S. mayor to undergo a recall election. Los Angeles, California mayor A.C. Harper had resigned in the face of a proposed recall in 1909.

The same year that Gill was elected, the Washington State Legislature granted women's suffrage. Thus, when Gill's opponents managed to force a February 9, 1911 recall election, it was to a very different electorate, one that included 23,000 registered women voters, of whom 20,000 showed up at the polls. Real estate man George W. Dilling defeated Gill by a margin of 6,000 votes. Wappenstein was convicted of corruption and imprisoned; Times publisher Blethen and his son Clarence were also tried, but were acquitted. Gill ran again for mayor in March 1912, but progressive George F. Cotterill won (with Socialist Hulet Wells coming in second). Gill resumed the practice of law.

== Comeback and second and third term as mayor ==
But Cotterill did not have an easy time in office. Labor troubles and the Potlach Riots of 1913 allowed Blethen at the Times to paint Cotterill as an ally of the Industrial Workers of the World (IWW), laying ground for Gill's political revival in the 1914 election. This time, though, Gill ran on a "closed town" platform and, remarkably, scored well with labor in the election. He was re-elected in 1916.

Gill appointed progressive Austin Griffiths—one of his opponents for the mayoralty—as police chief. He maintained a more neutral stance toward City Light than before: while still by no means a proponent of public utilities, he no longer actively obstructed the utility, nor did he (as before) force it to take on the most unprofitable tasks while leaving all good opportunities to the private sector. When Washington "went dry" (prohibited alcohol) in 1916, Gill enforced it aggressively, with police raids extending even to the elite Rainier Club (and with police causing significant damage to raided establishments). He took labor's side in several (though not all) strike actions, and even spoke out on behalf of the IWW after the 1916 Everett Massacre, earning him the wrath of the Times (while doing nothing to ingratiate him with his longtime enemies at the Seattle Post-Intelligencer).

== Downfall ==
But Gill was not quite cut out to be the reformer. His early, dramatic prohibition raids did not go entirely well. In September 1916 Seattle weekly magazine had occasion to write, "So far as enforcing the prohibition law, the mayor has not tried to do that in the manner provided by the law. He chose the spectacular, bust-em-up-with-an-ax plan of action... Hence the whole proceeding has come to naught." And, despite those raids, he—and his "progressive" police chief—were soon taking protection money from bootleggers. Seattle was back to being, in effect, an "open town", so much so that the U.S. Army declared it off-limits, which was not good for business. And in January 1918, Gill was disbarred for a year for unethical solicitation of legal work. Gill ran for reelection in 1918, but was trounced, and died less than a year later. He is interred at Evergreen Washelli Memorial Park.
