= Clemens J. France =

American labor lawyer and reformer

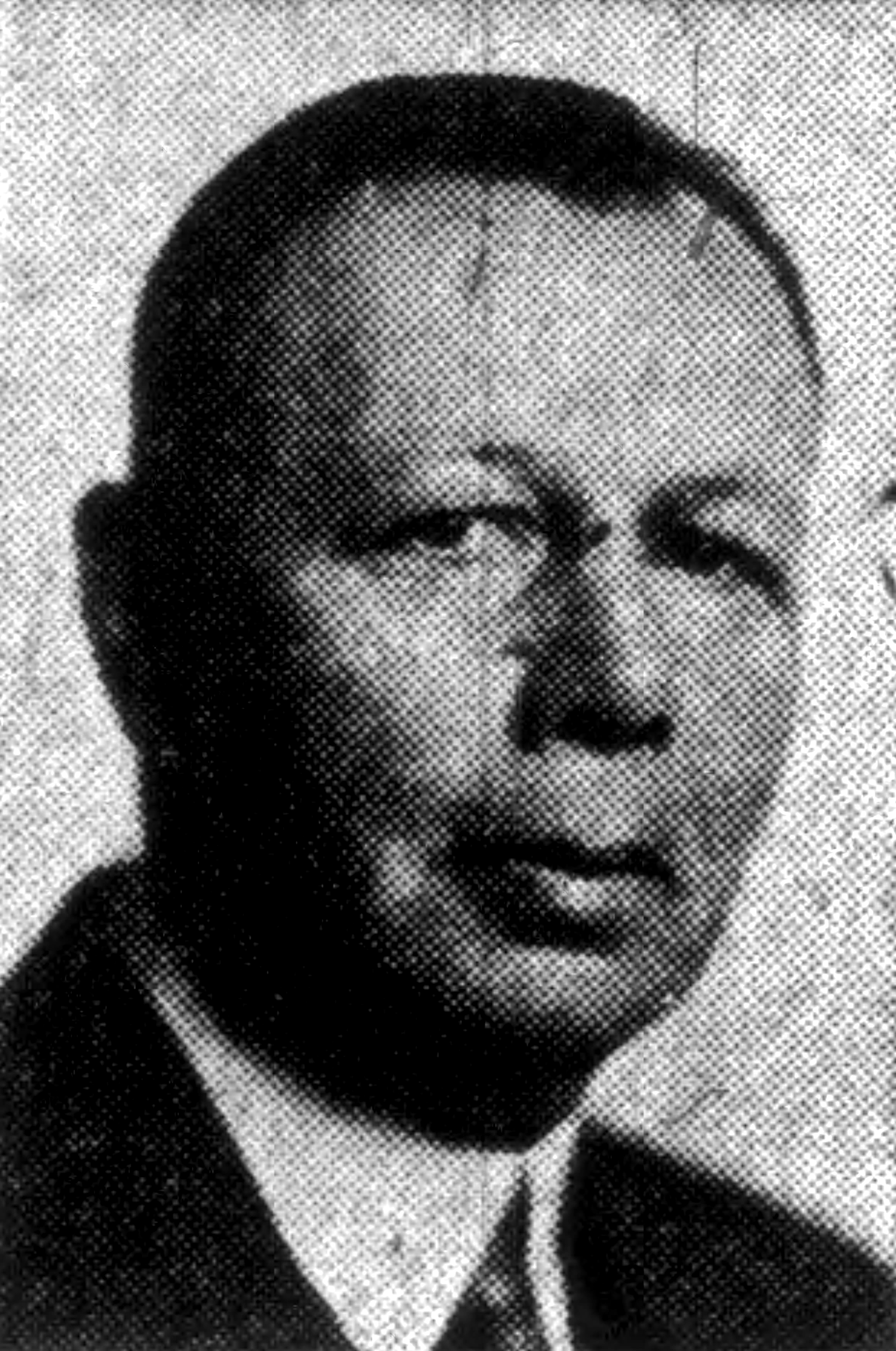
- France c. 1929
- Born: Clemens James France; January 22, 1877; Kalamazoo, Michigan
- Died: June 9, 1959 (aged 82); Sebec Lake, Maine
- Education: Baltimore Law School
- Occupations: Lawyer, politician
- Years active: 1908–1953
- Employer(s): State Department of Social Welfare of Rhode Island, Director (1936–1948)
- Organization(s): Municipal League of Seattle, Founder; Committee to Aid Constitutional Challenges of the McCarran Act, Chairman
- Political party: Farmer-Labor Party
- Other political affiliations: Progressive Party
- Board member of: American Committee for Relief in Ireland
- Spouse: Annie Lapham (m. 1906)
- Children: 2
- Parents: Reverend Joseph H. France (father); Hannah Fletcher James (mother)
- Family: Joseph I. France (brother)

Clemens James France (January 22, 1877 – June 9, 1959) was a labor lawyer, third-party election candidate in Washington (1920) and Rhode Island (1948), and social security advocate. A member of the American Committee for Relief in Ireland during the Irish War of Independence, France contributed to the drafting of the 1922 Constitution of the Irish Free State. As Director of the State Department of Social Welfare of Rhode Island (1936–48), he oversaw the development of a comprehensive social security program. In later years, France contributed to a range of civil liberty causes during the McCarthyist period of the 1950s.

== Early life ==
Clemens James France was born on January 22, 1877, in Kalamazoo, Michigan, US. He was one of seven children born to Hannah Fletcher James and the Reverend Joseph H. France, a Presbyterian minister. His older brother, Joseph Irwin, was a Republican United States Senator from Maryland from 1917 to 1923. France was educated at Hamilton College, Clinton, New York and Baltimore Law School. In September 1908, France, now married to Annie Lapham, migrated to Seattle, Washington where he built a successful general law practice. On May 1, 1915, the Municipal Corporation of Seattle appointed France attorney for the Port Commission, the body tasked with the development of what was then the largest port on the Pacific Coast.

== Seattle, the Municipal League and the Farmer–Labor Party ==
France was a founding member and later president of the Municipal League of Seattle. The National Municipal League of America identified with Theodore Roosevelt's Progressive Party and sought to challenge monopoly power in business and corruption in politics. The League drew into its all-male membership a wide range of professionals, clergymen, small-business owners, and union leaders. Responding to contemporary robber barons and party patronage, the Municipal League advocated non-partisanship, efficiency, and economy in city government, as well as the public ownership of utilities. To this end, it established committees for health, sanitation, utilities, harbour development, city budgeting, and city planning.

In 1920, France was chosen to run for the US Senate on the Farmer–Labor Party ticket. Racial divisions dominated the campaign. While Farmer–Labor candidates took a principled stand against exclusionary anti-Japanese legislation, they lost support to Republicans and Democrats among farming and working-class communities fearful of competition from cheap migrant labour. Though he lost to the incumbent Republican candidate, Wesley Livsey Jones, France polled 99,309 votes, 30,000 more than the better-known Democrat George Cotterill.

Washington election
Party	Candidate	Votes	%
Republican	Wesley Livsey Jones (Incumbent)	217,069	56.40%
Farmer–Labor	Clemens J. France	99,309	25.80%
Democratic	George F. Cotterill	68,488	17.80%
Majority		117,760	30.60%
Turnout		384,866	
Republican hold			

== The American Committee for Relief in Ireland ==
France was a prominent member of the Washington branch of the American Committee for Relief in Ireland. He was chosen to lead a small group of philanthropists and social experts tasked with surveying conditions in war-torn Ireland with a view to distributing more than $5 million in relief aid. The American Committee carried out its inspection tour of the war-torn island of Ireland between February 12 and March 31, 1921. They visited some ninety-five villages and towns which had been damaged extensively in the fighting and a further one hundred and fifty which had suffered damage to one degree or another. Some 100,000 men, women and children had been forced into unemployment, homelessness or some form of destitution directly as a result of war-time conditions. The American Committee distributed relief efficaciously and in a non-partisan manner. France's involvement in the Relief Committee and his background in law led to an invitation from Michael Collins, then head of the Provisional Government of Ireland, to participate in the drafting of the 1922 Constitution of the Irish Free State.

== The 1922 Irish Free State Constitution ==
France contributed substantially to the making of the 1922 Irish Free State Constitution.

Uniquely among the drafters, he outlined the necessity of an economic foundation for Irish independence. France proposed that the Irish Free State could industrialize its predominantly agricultural economy in an egalitarian manner by ensuring public ownership of natural resources. France advocated constitutional provisions similar to Henry George's proposals for a land value tax to capture for the state any 'unearned increment' generated by rising property values.

France also advocated direct democracy through referendum, initiative, and urban commission mechanisms. In particular, the inclusion of the initiative article in the 1922 Constitution appears to have been significantly influenced by his input and by the experience of the initiative provided by Washington State.

Ultimately, the Irish Free State's parliament, as well as the British government, rejected the economic rights provisions as ‘socialistic'. While the experimental initiative provisions were included in the final constitution, the Provisional Government abandoned them within the decade. The interpretation and rejection of France's proposals indicates the political constraints on socio-economic and democratic development in the Irish Free State. France returned to the US in the summer of 1922.

== Director of the State Department of Social Welfare of Rhode Island ==
During the Great Depression of the 1930s, France worked for five years as Chairman of the Unemployment Compensation Board for Rhode Island. He was appointed Director of the State Department of Social Welfare of Rhode Island in 1936, a position he would retain until 1948. France was a vigorous and successful advocate for the extension of social security in Rhode Island. The Massachusetts State Federation of Labor highlighted France's efforts to extend general assistance on a universal basis to all those unable to earn a livelihood or engage in work relief. In 1946, the United States House Committee on Ways and Means recognized France's role in developing Rhode Island's social security programs, one of the most comprehensive in the Union.

In 1948, France resigned from the department to run for governor of Rhode Island on the Progressive party ticket. He was unsuccessful. Now in his 70s, this was his last attempt to run for public office.

== Final years ==
France maintained a law office in Providence until his retirement in 1953. After World War Two, as anti-Communist hysteria mounted during the Cold War, France gave lively support to progressive causes and to defending civil liberties. This included support for Albert Einstein's Emergency Committee of Atomic Scientists, the National Lawyers Guild, and the American Committee for the Protection of Foreign Born.

In 1951, France was appointed chairman of the Committee to Aid Constitutional Challenges of the McCarran Act, a law mandating government registration of Communists and members of Communist front organizations.

In 1953, France became Chairman of the Emergency Committee of the Arts and Professions to Secure Clemency for Julius and Ethel Rosenberg. Notably, from 1955 to 1957, Clemens France was one of the three officially approved correspondents with Elizabeth Gurley Flynn, the former organizer for the Industrial Workers of the World and then official with the Communist Party of the USA, during her imprisonment at Alderson Penitentiary, West Virginia.

In 1959, at the age of 82, France died of a heart attack at his summer home in Sebec Lake, Maine. He was survived by two daughters, a brother, and a sister.
