= John Franklin Miller (Washington politician) =

American politician (1862–1936)

- Miller c. 1908

Member of the U.S. House of Representatives from Washington's 1st district
- In office March 4, 1917 – March 3, 1931
- Preceded by: William E. Humphrey
- Succeeded by: Ralph Horr

26th Mayor of Seattle
- In office March 16, 1908 – March 21, 1910
- Preceded by: William Hickman Moore
- Succeeded by: Hiram Gill

Personal details
- Born: June 9, 1862 near South Bend, Indiana, U.S.
- Died: May 28, 1936 (aged 73) Seattle, Washington, U.S.
- Party: Republican
- Relatives: John Franklin Miller (uncle)
- Education: Valparaiso University

John Franklin Miller (June 9, 1862 – May 28, 1936), an American politician, served as a member of the United States House of Representatives from 1917 to 1931. He represented the First Congressional District of Washington as a Republican. He also served as the mayor of Seattle from 1908 through 1910.

Miller ran for election to the seat being vacated by fellow Republican William Humphrey (who was running for United States Senate) in 1916, winning that election and the elections of 1918, 1920, 1922, 1924, 1926, and 1928. He was defeated for the Republican nomination in 1930 by Ralph Horr, who then won the general election. John Franklin Miller was named after his uncle, also John Franklin Miller, a senator from California. Both sometimes went by John F. Miller.

Miller supported racist policies in Congress, claiming to his fellow House members that "No greater tragedy can befall an American girl than to become the wife of a Japanese," and "There is not a scientist, an alienist, a scholar of the world who does not believe in the preservation of racial purity."

Political offices
Preceded by William Hickman Moore	Mayor of Seattle; 1908–1910	Succeeded by Hiram C. Gill
U.S. House of Representatives
Preceded by William Humphrey	Member of the U.S. House of Representatives from Washington's 1st congressional district 1917-1931	Succeeded by Ralph Horr
