= Robert W. Bagnall =

Robert Wellington Bagnall Jr. (1883–1943) was born in Norfolk, Virginia in 1883. He was a minister for the St. Matthew's Episcopal Church in 1911 and continued various careers connected to church leadership. He is most known for his civil rights activism during the 1920s. He worked for the NAACP in several positions for over 20 years.

== Career ==
=== Church ===
Bagnall's career was directly connected to his religious education and work experience. He attended and became a graduate of Bishop Payne Divinity School in Petersburg, VA. Later, he became a priest in 1903. After his ordination, Bagnall "presided over several African Methodist Episcopal (AME) congregations along the Atlantic seaboard before arriving at Detroit and becoming a Rector of the St. Matthew Episcopal" church in 1911. From 1921 to 1933 he served as Dean for the School of Religious Education for Colored People. In 1933, he became the 13th Rector of the St. Thomas Episcopal Church, where he spent the last ten years of his life. During those ten years, Bagnall restored and uplifted the congregation. Along with his wife, Lilian Anderson Bagnall, they led the movement of the St. Thomas Episcopal Church from 12th and Walnut street to 52nd and Parish street.

In his preachings, Bagnall was known as one of the most militant African American ministers in the United States. In his 1921 book The History of the Negro Church, historian Carter Godwin Woodson wrote that Bagnall was one of the few who had "actually preached the use of force and encouraged resistance to the mobs" of whites attacking Blacks in the early 20th century.

=== National Association for the Advancement of Colored People ===
Bagnall was one of the founders of the Detroit branch of the NAACP in the 1910s, where, as a spokesperson of the NAACP, he "led successful campaigns against school segregation, police brutality, and discrimination at the Ford Motor Company." His work there gave him recognition in the organization, and he was promoted to Regional Recruiter/district organizer in the Great Lakes area in 1918, where he served for a short time. He was promoted again in 1921 and moved to New York to serve as the National Director of Branches for the NAACP. Due to the Great Depression, in 1933, Bagnall resigned from his position because the organization had to cut staff and salaries.
