= Lester Apartments =

Building in Seattle, Washington, US (1911–1951)

Coordinates: 47°34′31″N 122°19′11″W

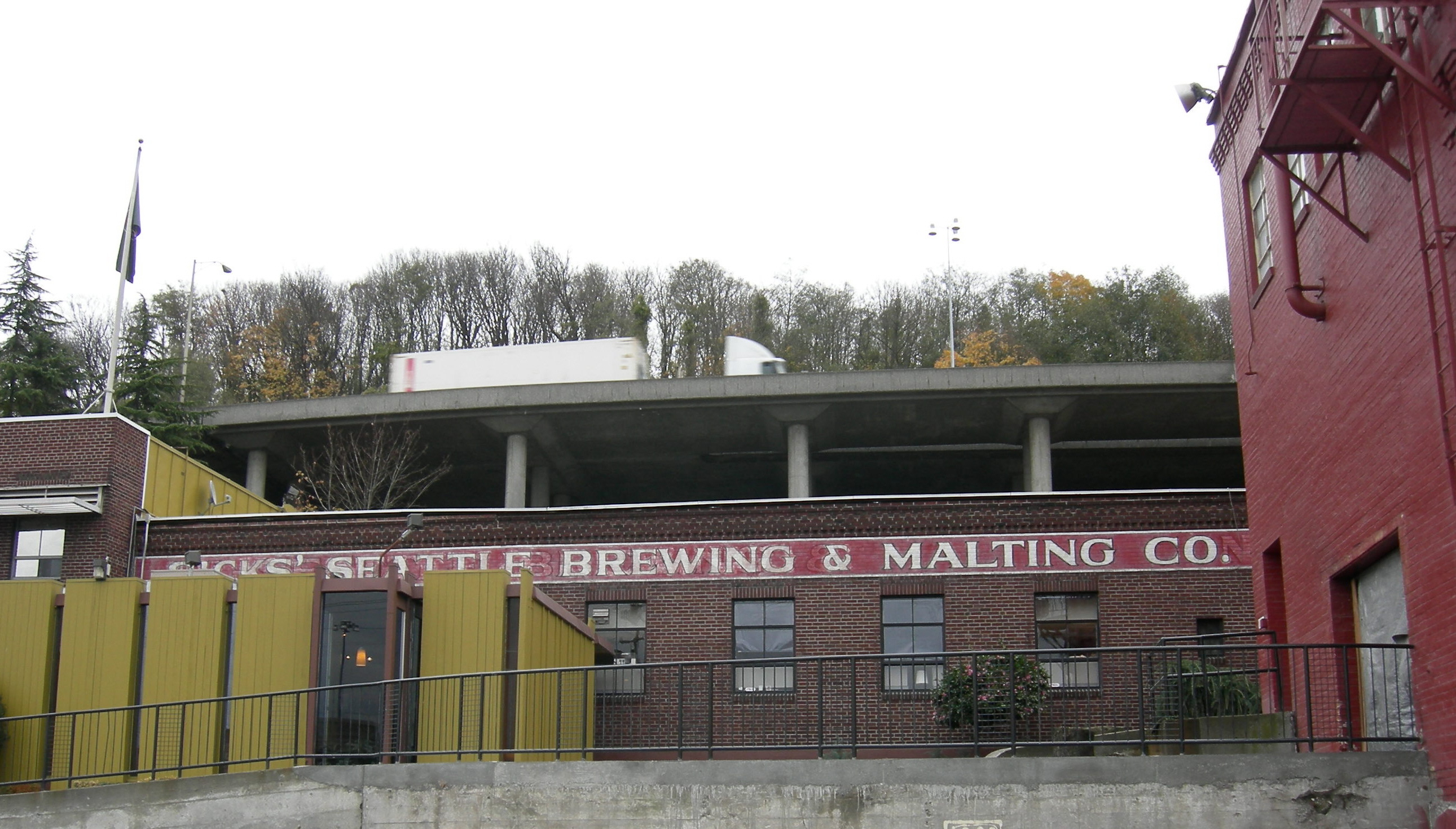
The brewery that was clipped by the B-50 Superfortress before it crashed into the Lester. Interstate 5 now runs through where the apartment building once stood.

The Lester Apartments was a building on the west side of Beacon Hill, Seattle, Washington, United States. It was constructed in 1910–1911, originally intended to be the world's largest brothel. After scandal (and women's suffrage) forced Seattle mayor Hiram Gill from office, the building was converted to be an ordinary apartment house. It met a disastrous end when a B-50 Superfortress crashed into it in 1951, causing a fire that engulfed the building.

== History ==
Hiram Gill was elected Seattle mayor in 1910 on an "open city" platform. He re-appointed Charles "Wappy" Wappenstein, previously dismissed for corruption, as chief of police. Their administration was dramatically corrupt, to the point of being a national news story. Among other things, police chief Wappenstein cut a graft deal with vice bosses Clarence Gerald and Gideon Tupper: his payoffs amounted to a US$10 per month tax on prostitutes, paid into Wappenstein's pocket. Tupper and Gerald decided to capitalize on their situation and formed the Hillside Improvement Company to build a resort on the west side of Beacon Hill (just uphill from Sicks’ Seattle Brewing and Malting Company, the Rainier Brewery, now Tully's Coffee) including a 500-room brothel, a wood-frame building so big that it required a street vacation, and which would have been the world's largest brothel.

Gill was recalled from office February 9, 1911 and the 500 "cribs" were combined into ordinary multi-room apartments. The building came to be known as the Lester Apartments. Eventually, many Boeing workers at nearby Boeing Field took up residence there, especially during World War II.

The proximity to Boeing Field proved to be the building's downfall. On August 13, 1951, at about 2:15 P.M., a Boeing B-50D-110-BO Superfortress bomber, 49-0268, took off from Boeing Field on a flight to check out military equipment. Three Air Force men and three Boeing employees were aboard. The plane developed engine trouble immediately after taking off. The right wing nicked the top of the brewery and the plane cartwheeled into the apartment house, killing the plane's crew of six. The plane had 4,000 US gallons (15,000 L) of fuel, and all engines were on. The collision and resulting conflagration killed five of the building's residents and injured eleven others. The building was damaged beyond repair.
