= American Committee for Relief in Ireland =

The American Committee for Relief in Ireland was formed through the initiative of Dr. William J. Maloney and others in 1920, with the intention of giving financial assistance to civilians in Ireland who had been injured or suffered severe financial hardship due to the ongoing Irish War of Independence. It was only one of several US based philanthropic organisations that emerged following World War I with a view to influencing the post-war settlement from their perspective of social justice, economic development and long term stability in Europe. Some of them concentrated their efforts on events in Ireland, and while activists of Irish ethnicity were well represented, membership was far from confined to Americans of Irish heritage. Apart from the ACOMRI, bodies such as the American Commission on Irish Independence and the American Commission on Conditions in Ireland raised money and attempted to influence US foreign policy in a manner sympathetic to the goal of Irish secession from the United Kingdom.

== Political background ==
This period of Irish political radicalism coincided with a Red Scare in the United States. Jim Larkin, an Irish trade unionist, who had been closely associated with James Connolly in Ireland and with the Wobblies in the US, was serving a five-year sentence in Sing Sing prison for promoting his socialist agenda. While his political views differed fundamentally from most of the Sinn Féin leadership, Irish republicanism was seen by many of the American establishment as based on a questionable ideology. During the Irish war of independence, the activities of Irish-American fund-raising organisations were viewed with suspicion and kept under close scrutiny by the intelligence services including J. Edgar Hoover, head of the General Intelligence Division of the Bureau of Investigation. US policy towards Irish concerns, initially hostile or at best indifferent, became somewhat less so following the 1920 U.S. presidential election and the landslide victory of Warren G. Harding over James M. Cox.

== Genesis of the ACOMRI ==
Following the burning of parts of Cork on 11 December 1920 by British forces (consisting of the Black and Tans and the Auxiliary Division) during the Irish War of Independence, the city's Lord Mayor, Donal O'Callaghan made approached to the American Red Cross for humanitarian assistance. The society, having taken advice from U.S. President Woodrow Wilson, the British embassy in Washington, D.C., the Foreign Office and the British Red Cross Society, declined his appeal. Numerous organisations and committees across the United States, operating independently in raising humanitarian aid money for Irish causes realised that their funds would not be channelled through the U.S. Committee of the Red Cross, and so another distribution channel was needed. Five days after the burning of Cork, a widely publicised meeting took place at the Banker's Club in New York City. It was organised by William Maloney with the intention of establishing a single nationwide organisation. It would have as its goal, explicitly and solely for the purpose of humanitarian relief, the raising and distribution in Ireland of $10 million.

The body which soon emerged styled itself 'The American Committee for Relief in Ireland'. One of its founding members, Levi Hollingsworth Wood, approached a Dublin-based businessman and fellow Quaker, James Douglas, requesting his assistance in the local distribution of the funds on a non-partisan basis. In Ireland, Douglas spoke with Laurence O'Neill, the Lord Mayor of Dublin, who in turn contacted senior members of Sinn Féin to inform them of the wishes of the American Committee. These meetings culminated in the establishment of the Irish White Cross, for the purpose of local distribution of the committee's funds. In Belfast, where many Irish Catholics had been driven out of their homes by Protestant mobs, AMCOMRI purchased land near the Falls Road for 100 houses for refugees in what is named Acomri Street.

== Bibliography ==
Douglas, James G. Ed. J. Anthony Gaughan: Memoirs of Senator James G. Douglas- Concerned Citizen:University College Dublin Press: 1998: ISBN 1-900621-19-3

Whelan, Bernadette : United States Foreign Policy and Ireland - From Empire to Independence, 1913-29 :Four Courts Press : 2006 ISBN 978-1-84682-010-6
