= William Hickman Moore =

American politician

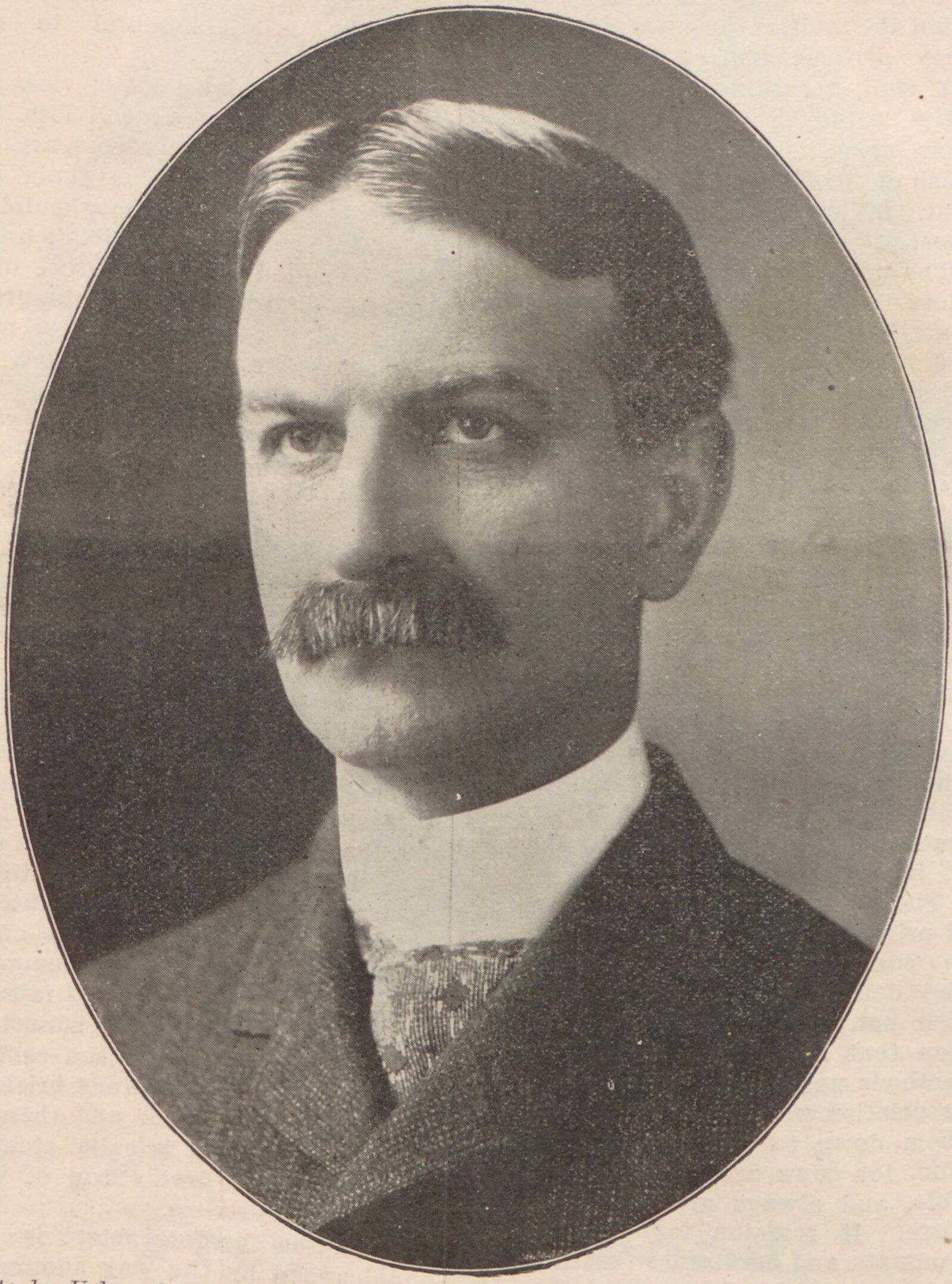
- William Hickman Moore in 1902

25th Mayor of Seattle
- In office March 19, 1906 – March 16, 1908
- Preceded by: Richard A. Ballinger
- Succeeded by: John Franklin Miller

Member of the Washington Senate from the 34th district
- In office January 12, 1903 – January 14, 1907
- Preceded by: D. E. Biggs
- Succeeded by: George U. Piper

Personal details
- Born: William Hickman Moore; May 26, 1861 St. Louis, Missouri, U.S.
- Died: March 13, 1946 (aged 84) Seattle, Washington, U.S.
- Party: Democratic
- Alma mater: University of Michigan

William Hickman Moore (May 26, 1861 – March 13, 1946) was an American politician who served as Mayor of Seattle from 1906 to 1908.

== Career ==
In 1906, Moore became the mayor if Seattle. Moore also served as a member of the Washington State Senate from the 34th district from 1902 to 1906 and as a member of the Seattle City Council from 1916 to 1922 and from 1924 to 1930. In between his stint as mayor and city councilman, Moore worked in private practice and was appointed to the city charter commission in 1914.

== Personal life ==
Moore died on March 13, 1946, at his home in Seattle.
