= Edward Nockels =

American electrician and trade unionist

- Born: 1869; Dubuque, Iowa, United States
- Died: February 27, 1937 (aged 67–68); Chicago, Illinois, United States
- Occupation(s): Electrician and Trade Unionist
- Known for: Secretary of the Chicago Federation of Labor, founder of WCFL

Edward N. Nockels (1869 – February 27, 1937) was an American electrician and trade unionist. Nockels was the secretary of the Chicago Federation of Labor from 1903 until his death. He was born in Dubuque, Iowa and trained as an electrician. He was an ally of American Federation of Labor leaders Samuel Gompers and William Green. Conversely, Nockels and CFL president John Fitzpatrick were considered by some as "radical fabians" and were close friends with radical labor organizer Mother Jones. He is credited with founding WCFL, which was called the "Voice of Labor". Nockels spearheaded the effort to establish a labor-union radio station over the misgivings of the board of the CFL and Fitzpatrick himself.

Nockels died at a Chicago restaurant of a heart attack on February 27, 1937.
