= 1924 United States gubernatorial elections =

← 1923	November 4, 1924; October 7, 1924 (AR); September 8, 1924 (ME)	1925 →

36 governorships (Note: Including a special election in Wyoming.)
	Majority party	Minority party
Party	Democratic	Republican
Seats before	26	22 (Note: Frank E. Lucas (R) succeeded Wyoming Governor William B. Ross (D) upon his death in office in October 1924.)
Seats after	24	24
Seat change	▼2	▲2
Seats up	16	20
Seats won	14	22
- Democratic gain Democratic hold Republican gain Republican hold

United States gubernatorial elections were held in 1924, in 36 states (including 1 special election), concurrent with the House, Senate elections and presidential election, on November 4, 1924. Elections took place on October 7, 1924, in Arkansas, and September 8, 1924, in Maine.

This was the last time South Carolina elected its governors to two-year terms. It switched to four-years-terms from the 1926 election.

== Results ==
State	Incumbent	Party	Status	Opposing candidates
Arizona	George W. P. Hunt	Democratic	Re-elected, 50.53%	Dwight B. Heard (Republican) 49.47%
Arkansas (held, 7 October 1924)	Thomas Chipman McRae	Democratic	Retired, Democratic victory	Thomas J. Terral (Democratic) 79.84% John W. Grabiel (Republican) 20.16%
Colorado	William E. Sweet	Democratic	Defeated, 44.04%	Clarence J. Morley (Republican) 51.92% Frank Cass (Farmer Labor) 3.16% William R. Dietrich (Workers) 0.46% Louis E. Leeder (Liberal) 0.41%
Connecticut	Charles A. Templeton	Republican	Retired, Republican victory	Hiram Bingham (Republican) 66.18% Charles G. Morris (Democratic) 31.88% Jasper McLevy (Socialist) 1.39% Joseph Mackay (Socialist Labor) 0.35% William Mackenzie (Workers) 0.20%
Delaware	William D. Denney	Republican	Retired, Republican victory	Robert P. Robinson (Republican) 59.64% Joseph Bancroft (Democratic) 39.16% Frank A. Houck (Progressive) 0.72% Kenneth A. Horner (Independent) 0.47%
Florida	Cary A. Hardee	Democratic	Term-limited, Democratic victory	John W. Martin (Democratic) 82.79% William R. O'Neal (Republican) 17.21%
Georgia	Clifford M. Walker	Democratic	Re-elected, 100.00%	(Democratic primary results); Clifford M. Walker 100.00%
Idaho	Charles C. Moore	Republican	Re-elected, 43.94%	H. F. Samuels (Progressive) 39.02% A. L. Freehafer (Democratic) 16.82% Dennis J. O'Mahoney (Socialist) 0.22%
Illinois	Len Small	Republican	Re-elected, 56.72%	Norman L. Jones (Democratic) 42.40% Andrew Lafin (Socialist) 0.63% William F. Dunne (Workers) 0.10% Fred Koch (Socialist Labor) 0.10% James A. Logan (Independent Republican) 0.04% Morris Lynchenheim (Commonwealth Land) 0.02%
Indiana	Emmett Forest Branch	Republican	Retired, Republican victory	Edward L. Jackson (Republican) 52.92% Carleton B. McCulloch (Democratic) 46.29% Francis M. Wampler (Socialist) 0.48% Basil L. Allen (Prohibition) 0.31%
Iowa	Nathan E. Kendall	Republican	Retired, Republican victory	John Hammill (Republican) 72.72% James C. Murtagh (Democratic) 27.28%
Kansas	Jonathan M. Davis	Democratic	Defeated, 27.72%	Ben S. Paulen (Republican) 49.02% William Allen White (Independent) 22.71% M. L. Phillips (Socialist) 0.55%
Maine (held, 8 September 1924)	Percival Proctor Baxter	Republican	Retired, Republican victory	Ralph Owen Brewster (Republican) 57.22% William R. Pattangall (Democratic) 42.78%
Massachusetts	Channing H. Cox	Republican	Retired, Republican victory	Alvan Tufts Fuller (Republican) 56.03% James Michael Curley (Democratic) 42.19% John J. Ballam (Workers) 0.82% Walter S. Hutchins (Socialist) 0.54% James Hayes (Socialist Labor) 0.42%
Michigan	Alex J. Groesbeck	Republican	Re-elected, 68.84%	Edward Frensdorf (Democratic) 29.60% Faith Johnston (Prohibition) 0.96% Paul Dinger (Socialist Labor) 0.35% William L. Krieghoff (Socialist) 0.24% Scattering 0.02%
Minnesota	J. A. O. Preus	Republican	Retired, Republican victory	Theodore Christianson (Republican) 48.71% Floyd B. Olson (Farmer-Labor) 43.84% Carlos Avery (Democratic) 5.91% Michael Ferch (Independent Progressive) 1.08% Oscar Anderson (Socialist Industrial) 0.46%
Missouri	Arthur M. Hyde	Republican	Term-limited, Republican victory	Samuel A. Baker (Republican) 49.39% Arthur W. Nelson (Democratic) 48.94% William M. Brandt (Socialist) 1.62% William Wesley Cox (Socialist Labor) 0.05%
Montana	Joseph M. Dixon	Republican	Defeated, 42.61%	John E. Erickson (Democratic) 51.04% Frank J. Edwards (Farmer Labor) 6.08% J. H. Matheson (Socialist) 0.27%
Nebraska	Charles W. Bryan	Democratic	Won primary but retired to run for U.S. Vice President, Republican victory	Adam McMullen (Republican) 51.09% John N. Norton (Democratic) 40.97% Dan Butler (Progressive) 7.94%
New Hampshire	Fred H. Brown	Democratic	Defeated, 46.06%	John Gilbert Winant (Republican) 53.94%
New Mexico	James F. Hinkle	Democratic	Retired, Democratic victory	Arthur T. Hannett (Democratic) 48.82% Manuel B. Otero (Republican) 48.64% Green B. Patterson (Progressive) 2.54%
New York	Alfred E. Smith	Democratic	Re-elected, 49.96%	Theodore Roosevelt Jr. (Republican) 46.63% Norman M. Thomas (Socialist) 3.07% James P. Cannon (Workers) 0.20% Frank E. Passonno (Socialist Labor) 0.15%
North Carolina	Cameron A. Morrison	Democratic	Term-limited, Democratic victory	Angus W. McLean (Democratic) 61.33% Isaac M. Meekins (Republican) 38.67%
North Dakota	Ragnvald Nestos	Republican	Defeated in Republican primary, Republican victory	Arthur G. Sorlie (Republican) 53.93% Halvor L. Halvorson (Democratic) 46.07%
Ohio	A. Victor Donahey	Democratic	Re-elected, 53.97%	Harry L. Davis (Republican) 45.01% Virgil D. Allen (Commonwealth Land) 0.60% Franklin J. Catlin (Socialist Labor) 0.43%
Rhode Island	William S. Flynn	Democratic	Retired to run for U.S. Senate, Republican victory	Aram J. Pothier (Republican) 58.56% Felix A. Toupin (Democratic) 41.00% Edward W. Theinert (Workers) 0.18% Charles F. Bishop (Socialist Labor) 0.15% Frederick W. Hurst (Socialist) 0.10%
South Carolina	Thomas Gordon McLeod	Democratic	Re-elected, 100.00%	(Democratic primary results); Thomas Gordon McLeod 61.45% John T. Duncan 38.55%
South Dakota	William H. McMaster	Republican	Retired to run for U.S. Senate, Republican victory	Carl Gunderson (Republican) 53.90% William J. Bulow (Democratic) 22.86% A. L. Putnam (Farmer Labor) 13.25% Richard Olsen Richards (Independent) 9.98%
Tennessee	Austin Peay	Democratic	Re-elected, 57.20%	T. F. Peck (Republican) 42.80%
Texas	Pat Morris Neff	Democratic	Retired, Democratic victory	Miriam A. Ferguson (Democratic) 58.89% George C. Butte (Republican) 41.11%
Utah	Charles Rendell Mabey	Republican	Defeated, 47.01%	George H. Dern (Democratic) 52.99%
Vermont	Redfield Proctor Jr.	Republican	Retired, Republican victory	Franklin Swift Billings (Republican) 79.25% Fred C. Martin (Democratic) 19.17% George S. Wood (Prohibition) 1.57% Scattering 0.02%
Washington	Louis F. Hart	Republican	Retired, Republican victory	Roland Hill Hartley (Republican) 56.41% Ben F. Hill (Democratic) 32.40% J. R. Oman (Progressive) 10.27% William A. Gilmore (State) 0.50% Emil Herman (Socialist) 0.23% David Burgess (Socialist Labor) 0.20%
West Virginia	Ephraim F. Morgan	Republican	Term-limited, Republican victory	Howard Mason Gore (Republican) 52.97% Jake Fisher (Democratic) 45.77% A. S. Bosworth (Socialist) 1.26%
Wisconsin	John J. Blaine	Republican	Re-elected, 51.76%	Martin L. Lueck (Democratic) 39.87% William F. Quick (Socialist) 5.68% Adolph R. Bucknam (Prohibition) 1.45% Severi Alanne (Workers) 0.52% Farrand K. Shuttleworth (Independent) 0.51% Jose Snover (Socialist Labor) 0.18%
Wyoming (special election)	Frank E. Lucas	Republican	Retired, Democratic victory	Nellie Tayloe Ross (Democratic) 55.12% E. J. Sullivan (Republican) 44.88%

== See also ==
- 1924 United States elections
  - 1924 United States presidential election
  - 1924 United States Senate elections
  - 1924 United States House of Representatives elections
