= 1924 South Dakota Senate election =

- November 4, 1924

45 seats in the South Dakota Senate 23 seats needed for a majority
	Majority party	Minority party	Third party
Leader	C. S. Amsden	—	—
Party	Republican	Democratic	Farmer–Labor
Leader since	1915	—	—
Leader's seat	31st (Grant Co.)	—	—
Last election	34	9	0
Seats after	34	9	1 (Note: Senator Stephen Henderson was elected to the previous Senate as a Nonpartisan Leaguer.)
Seat change	Steady	Steady	▲1
- Results by party Republican gain Republican hold Democratic gain Democratic hold Farmer–Labor hold Unknown, member did not serve Multi-member districts: Republican majority
President pro tempore before election
C. S. Amsden
Republican
Elected President pro tempore
C. S. Amsden
Republican

Elections to the South Dakota Senate were held on November 4, 1924, to elect 45 candidates to the Senate to serve a two-year term in the 19th South Dakota Legislature. Republicans retained their supermajority status in the chamber, holding 34 of the 45 Senate seats in the 19th Legislature, a net change of zero from the 1922 general election. C. S. Amsden of Grant County was re-elected President pro tempore of the Senate.

This election took place alongside races for U.S. President, U.S. Senate, U.S. House, governor, state house, and numerous other state and local elections.

== See also ==
- List of South Dakota state legislatures
