= 1930 South Dakota Senate election =

- November 4, 1930

45 seats in the South Dakota Senate 23 seats needed for a majority
	Majority party	Minority party
Leader	L. M. Simons	—
Party	Republican	Democratic
Leader since	1929	—
Leader's seat	39th (Butte–Lawrence)	—
Last election	33	12
Seats after	31	14
Seat change	▼2	▲2
- Results by party Republican gain Republican hold Democratic gain Democratic hold Multi-member districts: Republican majority Democratic majority
President pro tempore before election
L. M. Simons
Republican
Elected President pro tempore
L. M. Simons
Republican

Elections to the South Dakota Senate were held on November 4, 1930, to elect 45 candidates to the Senate to serve a two-year term in the 22nd South Dakota Legislature. Republicans won thirty-one seats, down from thirty-three at the 1928 general election, retaining their majority in the chamber. L. M. Simons of Belle Fourche was re-elected President pro tempore of the Senate.

This election took place alongside races for U.S. Senate, U.S. House, governor, state house, and numerous other state and local elections.

== See also ==
- List of South Dakota state legislatures
