= 1922 South Dakota Senate election =

- November 7, 1922

45 seats in the South Dakota Senate 23 seats needed for a majority
| | Majority party | Minority party | Third party |
|---|---|---|---|
| Leader | C. S. Amsden | — | — |
| Party | Republican | Democratic | Nonpartisan League |
| Leader since | 1915 | — | — |
| Leader's seat | 31st (Grant Co.) | — | — |
| Seats before | 42 | 1 | 2 |
| Seats after | 34 | 9 | 2 |
| Seat change | ▼8 | ▲8 | Steady |
- Results by party Republican hold Democratic gain Democratic hold Nonpartisan League hold Multi-member districts: Republican majority Even split
President pro tempore before election
C. S. Amsden
Republican
Elected President pro tempore
C. S. Amsden
Republican

Elections to the South Dakota Senate were held on November 7, 1922, to elect 45 candidates to the Senate to serve a two-year term in the 18th South Dakota Legislature. Republicans retained their supermajority status in the chamber, holding 34 of the 45 Senate seats in the 18th Legislature, though they lost eight seats to the Democrats. C. S. Amsden of Grant County was re-elected President pro tempore of the Senate.

This election took place alongside races for U.S. House, governor, state house, and numerous other state and local elections.

== See also ==
- List of South Dakota state legislatures
