= 1920 South Dakota Senate election =

- November 2, 1920

45 seats in the South Dakota Senate 23 seats needed for a majority
	Majority party	Minority party	Third party
Leader	C. S. Amsden	—	—
Party	Republican	Nonpartisan League	Democratic
Leader since	1915	—	—
Leader's seat	31st (Grant Co.)	—	—
Last election	43 seats	0 seats	2 seats
Seats won	42	2	1
Seat change	▼1	▲2	▼1
- Results by party Republican gain Republican hold Democratic gain Nonpartisan League gain Multi-member districts: Republican majority
President pro tempore before election
C. S. Amsden
Republican
Elected President pro tempore
C. S. Amsden
Republican

Elections to the South Dakota Senate were held on November 2, 1920, to elect 45 candidates to the Senate to serve a two-year term in the 17th South Dakota Legislature. Republicans retained their supermajority status in the chamber, holding 42 of the 45 Senate seats in the 17th Legislature. C. S. Amsden of Grant County was re-elected President pro tempore of the Senate.

This election took place alongside races for U.S. President, U.S. Senate, U.S. House, governor, state house, and numerous other state and local elections.

== See also ==
- List of South Dakota state legislatures
