= 1926 South Dakota Senate election =

- November 2, 1926

45 seats in the South Dakota Senate 23 seats needed for a majority
	Majority party	Minority party
Leader	C. S. Amsden	—
Party	Republican	Democratic
Leader since	1915	—
Leader's seat	31st (Grant Co.)	—
Last election	34	9
Seats after	30	15
Seat change	▼4	▲6
- Results by party Republican gain Republican hold Democratic gain Democratic hold Multi-member districts: Republican majority
President pro tempore before election
C. S. Amsden
Republican
Elected President pro tempore
C. S. Amsden
Republican

Elections to the South Dakota Senate were held on November 2, 1926, to elect 45 candidates to the Senate to serve a two-year term in the 20th South Dakota Legislature. Republicans won thirty seats, down from thirty-four at the 1924 general election, retaining their majority in the chamber. C. S. Amsden of Grant County was re-elected President pro tempore of the Senate.

This election took place alongside races for U.S. Senate, U.S. House, governor, state house, and numerous other state and local elections.

== See also ==
- List of South Dakota state legislatures
