= Governor McMaster =

Governor McMaster may refer to:

- Henry McMaster (born 1947), 117th Governor of South Carolina
- William H. McMaster (1877–1968), 10th Governor of South Dakota
