= Senator Forney =

Senator Forney may refer to:

- Alva Clark Forney (1871–1956), South Dakota State Senate
- Daniel Munroe Forney (1784–1847), North Carolina State Senate
