= 1932 South Dakota gubernatorial election =

- November 8, 1932
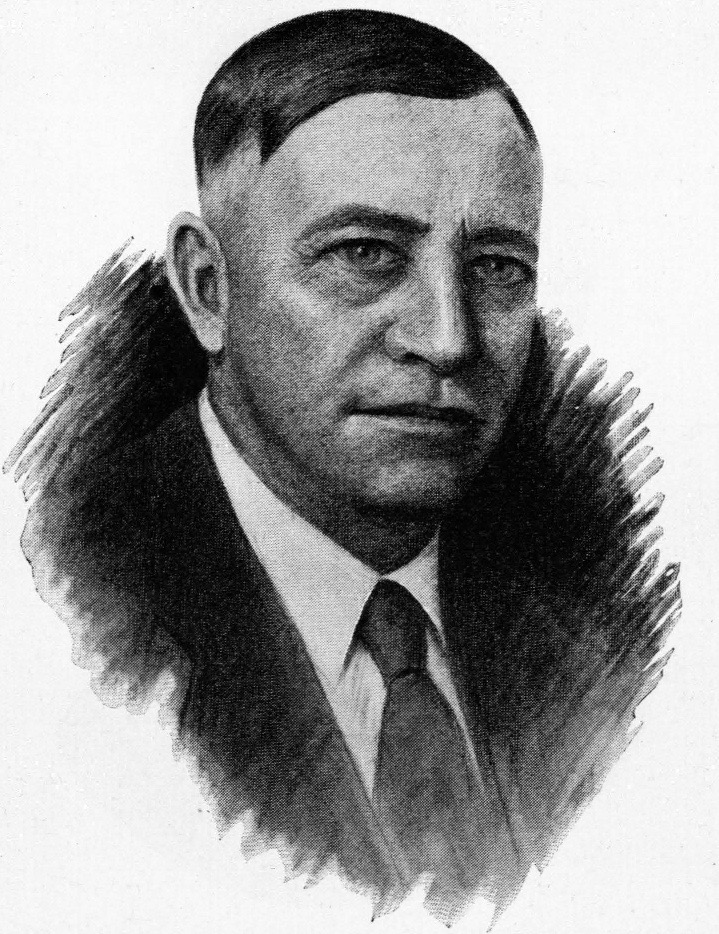

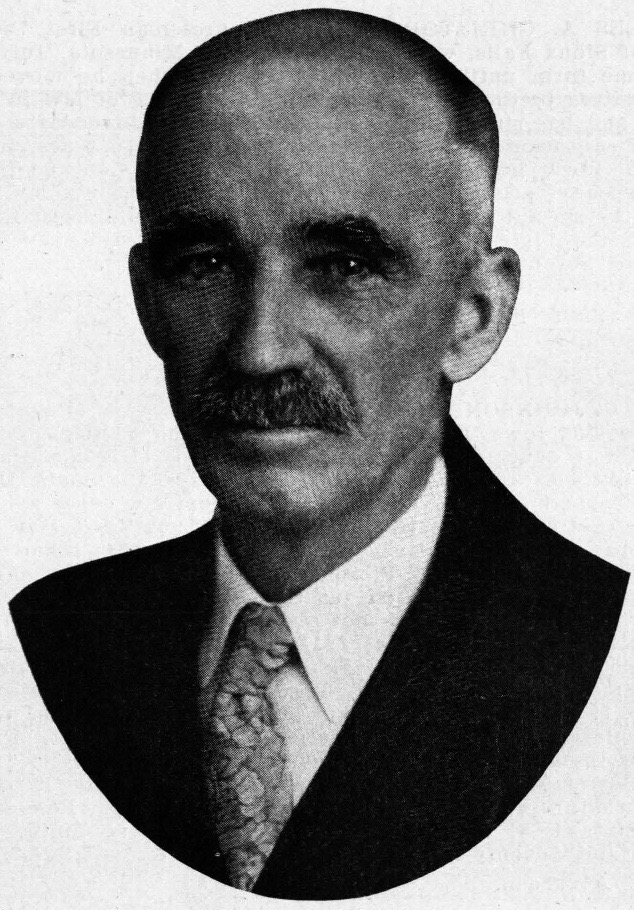
| Nominee | Tom Berry | Warren Green |
| Party | Democratic | Republican |
| Popular vote | 158,058 | 120,473 |
| Percentage | 55.63% | 42.40% |
- County results Berry: 40–50% 50–60% 60–70% 70–80% >90% Green: 50–60% 60–70%
Governor of South Dakota before election
Warren Green
Republican
Elected Governor of South Dakota
Tom Berry
Democratic

The 1932 South Dakota gubernatorial election was held on November 8, 1932. Incumbent Republican Governor Warren Green ran for re-election to a second term. He defeated former Governor Carl Gunderson in the Republican primary and faced former State Representative Tom Berry, the Democratic nominee, in the general election. Aided by Democratic presidential nominee Franklin D. Roosevelt's landslide victory in South Dakota, Berry defeated Green for re-election in a landslide.

== Democratic primary ==
=== Candidates ===
- Tom Berry, former State Representative
- Lorenzo E. Corey, former State Senator from Charles Mix County, 1930 Democratic candidate for Governor
- Emil Loriks, State Senator from Kingsbury County (eliminated at convention)

=== Results ===
Democratic primary
| Party | Candidate | Votes | % |
|---|---|---|---|
| Democratic | Tom Berry | 23,689 | 56.03% |
| Democratic | Lorenzo E. Corey | 18,591 | 43.97% |
| Total votes | | 42,280 | 100.00% |

== Republican primary ==
=== Candidates ===
- Warren Green, incumbent Governor
- Carl Gunderson, former Governor
- Tom Ayres, perennial candidate

=== Results ===
Republican primary
| Party | Candidate | Votes | % |
|---|---|---|---|
| Republican | Warren Green (inc.) | 74,194 | 58.12% |
| Republican | Carl Gunderson | 41,972 | 32.88% |
| Republican | Tom Ayres | 11,487 | 9.00% |
| Total votes | | 127,653 | 100.00% |

== General election ==
=== Results ===
1932 South Dakota gubernatorial election
| Party | Candidate | Votes | % | ±% |
|---|---|---|---|---|
| Democratic | Tom Berry | 158,058 | 55.63% | +9.40% |
| Republican | Warren Green (inc.) | 120,473 | 42.40% | −10.57% |
| Liberty | H. O. Stevens | 4,965 | 1.75% | — |
| Independent | Helge Tangen | 1,620 | 0.80% | — |
| Majority | | 37,585 | 13.23% | +6.49% |
| Turnout | | 284,115 | 100.00% | |
| Democratic gain from Republican | | | | |
