= Hyatt E. Covey =

American politician

15th Lieutenant Governor of South Dakota
- In office 1927–1929
- Governor: William J. Bulow
- Preceded by: Alva Clark Forney
- Succeeded by: Clarence E. Coyne

Personal details
- Born: September 1, 1875 LeRoy, Illinois, U.S.
- Died: August 3, 1968 (aged 92) Tripp County, South Dakota, U.S.
- Party: Republican
- Education: University of Chicago (A.B.)
- Occupation: Educator, Farmer, Politician

Hyatt E. Covey (September 1, 1875 – August 3, 1968) was 15th Lieutenant Governor of South Dakota from 1927 to 1929. He was a member of the Republican Party and served with a Democratic Party governor, William J. Bulow. He was from Hamill, South Dakota.

== Biography ==
He was born at LeRoy, Illinois, and attended normal school at Normal, Illinois. He graduated from the University of Chicago, with an A. B. degree in 1901, and became principal of the Montevideo, Minnesota, high school before homesteading in Tripp County, South Dakota in 1912. He commenced farming and stock raising and served in the state senate of the South Dakota Legislature, being elected in 1918, 1920, 1922, and 1924. He was elected lieutenant governor in 1926. He died in Tripp County.

== Notes ==
Political offices
Preceded by Alva Clark Forney	Lieutenant Governor of South Dakota; 1927–1929	Succeeded by Clarence E. Coyne
