= 1922 South Dakota gubernatorial election =

- November 7, 1922
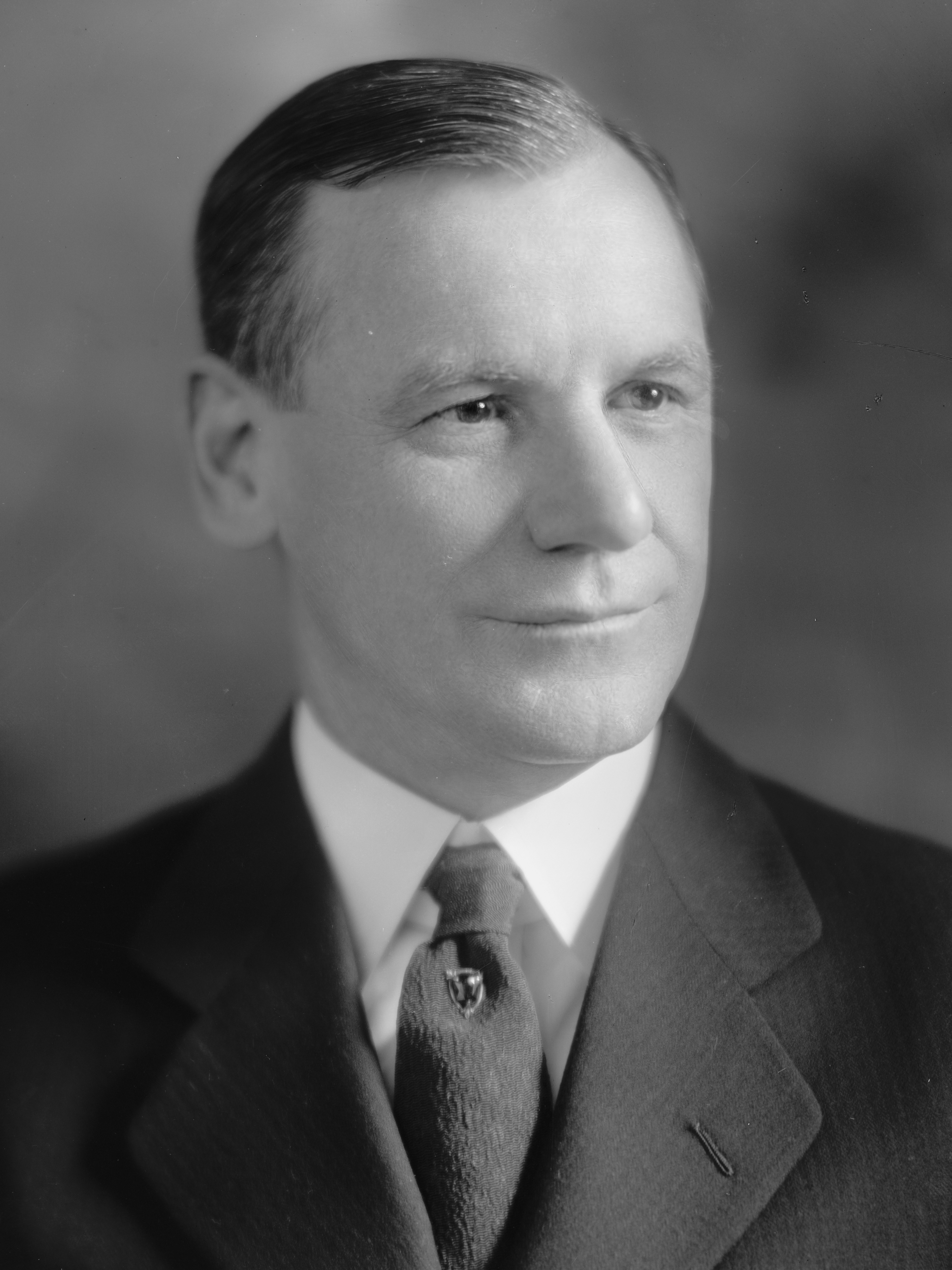

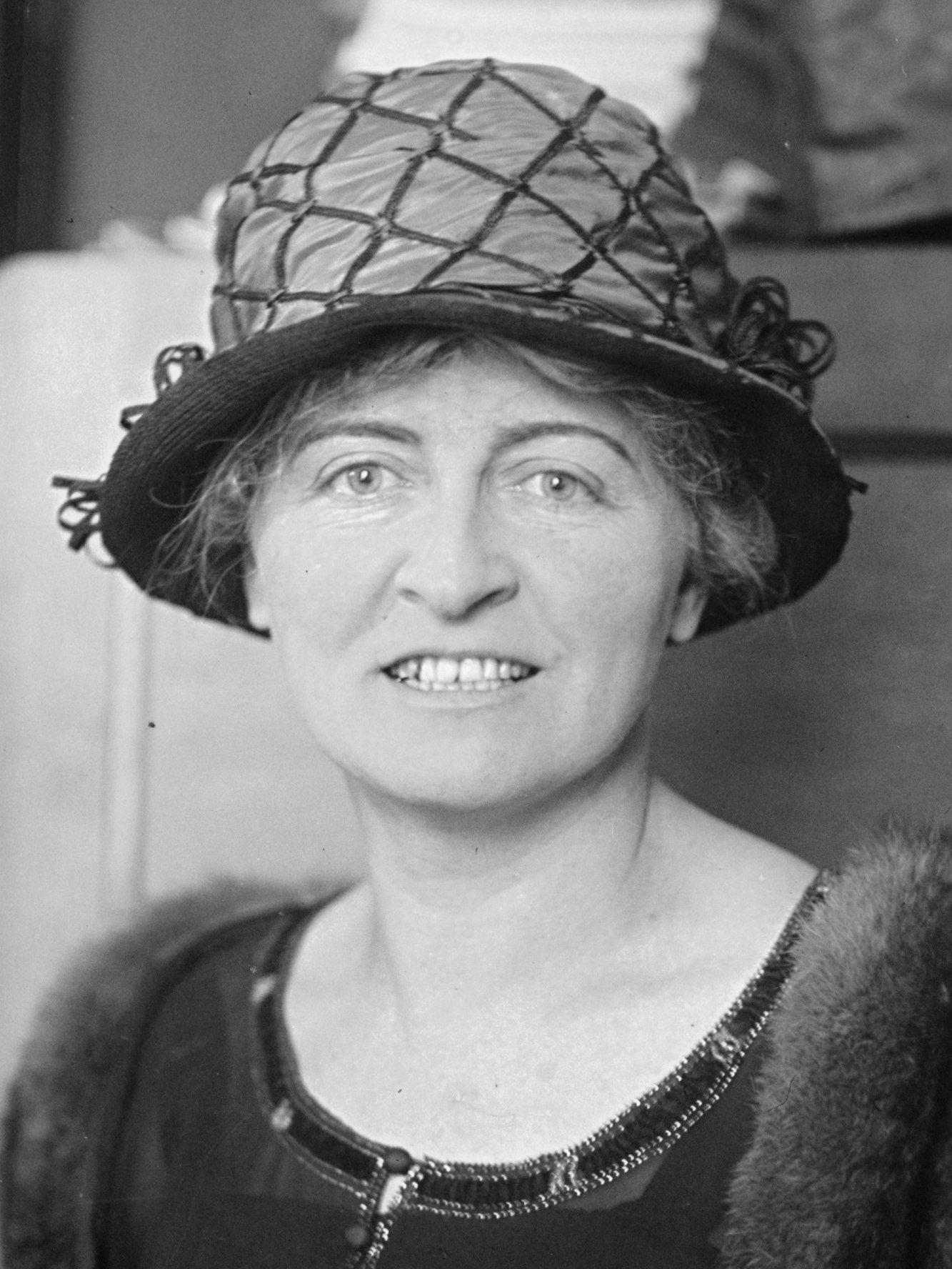
Nominee	William H. McMaster	Louis N. Crill	Alice Lorraine Daly
Party	Republican	Democratic	Nonpartisan League
Popular vote	78,984	50,409	46,033
Percentage	45.02%	28.74%	26.24%
- County results McMaster: 30–40% 40–50% 50–60% 60–70% 70–80% Crill: 30–40% 40–50% 50–60% Daly: 40–50% 50–60%
Governor of South Dakota before election
William H. McMaster
Republican
Elected Governor of South Dakota
William H. McMaster
Republican

The 1922 South Dakota gubernatorial election was held on November 7, 1922. Incumbent Republican Governor William H. McMaster ran for re-election to a second term. After beating back a challenge in the Republican primary from perennial candidate George W. Egan, McMaster advanced to the general election, where he faced former State Senate President Louis N. Crill, the Democratic nominee, and suffragist Alice Lorraine Daly, the Nonpartisan League's nominee, and the first woman to run for governor. McMaster won by a large margin, but the race was considerably narrower than the 1920 election.

== Primary elections ==
=== Democratic primary ===
Louis N. Crill, the former President of the State Senate and the 1902 Democratic nominee for Governor, was the only Democratic candidate to file for governor and won the nomination unopposed.

=== Republican primary ===
==== Candidates ====
- William H. McMaster, incumbent Governor
- George W. Egan, disbarred attorney, perennial candidate

==== Results ====
Republican primary
Party	Candidate	Votes	%
Republican	William H. McMaster	60,927	59.87%
Republican	George W. Egan	40,831	40.13%
Total votes		101,758	100.00%

== General election ==
=== Results ===
1922 South Dakota gubernatorial election
Party	Candidate	Votes	%	±%
Republican	William H. McMaster (inc.)	78,984	45.02%	−11.31%
Democratic	Louis N. Crill	50,409	28.74%	+11.40%
Nonpartisan League	Alice Lorraine Daly	46,033	26.24%	−0.09%
Majority		28,575	16.29%	−13.71%
Turnout		175,426	100.00%	
Republican hold				
