= Carl Gunderson =

American politician

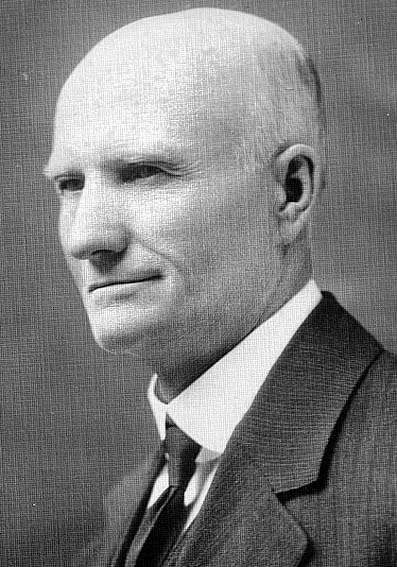

11th Governor of South Dakota
- In office January 6, 1925 – January 4, 1927
- Lieutenant: Alva Clark Forney
- Preceded by: William H. McMaster
- Succeeded by: William J. Bulow

13th Lieutenant Governor of South Dakota
- In office January 4, 1921 – January 6, 1925
- Governor: William H. McMaster
- Preceded by: William H. McMaster
- Succeeded by: Alva Clark Forney

Personal details
- Born: June 20, 1864 near Vermillion, Dakota Territory
- Died: February 26, 1933 (aged 68) Mitchell, South Dakota, U.S.
- Party: Republican
- Spouse: Gertrude Bertleson
- Children: 4
- Education: University of South Dakota; Cornell University
- Profession: Farmer

Carl Gunderson (June 20, 1864 – February 26, 1933) was an American politician who served as the 11th Governor of South Dakota. Gunderson, a Republican from Mitchell, South Dakota, served from 1925 to 1927.

== Biography ==
Gunderson was born in a log cabin in Clay County in the Dakota Territory, near Vermillion. As a young man, he filed a claim on a homestead in Clay County that remained dear to him all his life. He stated that his occupation was a farmer all his life. He attended the University of South Dakota and Cornell University. He went into the mercantile business in Vermillion. He married Gertrude Bertleson and they had four children.

== Career ==
Gunderson served five terms in the state senate of the South Dakota Legislature, being elected in 1892, 1896, 1898, 1900, and again in 1916. Gunderson served as president pro tempore of the senate in the 1899 session and served as the 13th Lieutenant Governor of South Dakota from 1921 to 1925 under Governor William H. McMaster.

In 1924, when McMaster declined to seek re-election, Gunderson successfully ran to succeed him. He defeated the Democratic nominee, William J. Bulow, in a landslide. In 1926, however, Gunderson narrowly lost to Bulow in a rematch of the 1924 election. He ran for Governor again in 1930. In the Republican primary, no candidate received 35% of the vote, and under state law, the nomination had to be decided by a convention of the state Republican Party. Despite placing second in the primary, Gunderson fared poorly in the convention; his support collapsed quickly and he faded from contention after the first few ballots. In 1932, Gunderson challenged Republican Governor Warren Green for renomination, but lost the Republican primary in a landslide.

== Death ==
After his defeat he returned to his home in Mitchell until his death on February 26, 1933. He was buried on the tract of land that he had homesteaded, Bluff View Cemetery, Vermillion, Clay County, South Dakota US.

Party political offices
Preceded by William H. McMaster	Republican nominee for Governor of South Dakota; 1924, 1926	Succeeded by Buell F. Jones
Political offices
Preceded by William H. McMaster	Lieutenant Governor of South Dakota; 1921–1925	Succeeded by Alva Clark Forney
Preceded by William H. McMaster	Governor of South Dakota; 1925–1927	Succeeded by William J. Bulow
