= Odell K. Whitney =

American politician

Lieutenant Governor of South Dakota
- In office 1931–1933
- Governor: Warren Green
- Preceded by: John T. Grigsby
- Succeeded by: Hans Ustrud

Personal details
- Born: December 31, 1884
- Died: June 11, 1967 (aged 82)
- Party: Republican

Odell K. Whitney (December 31, 1884 – June 11, 1967) was an American politician from the U.S. state of South Dakota. He served as lieutenant governor of South Dakota from 1931 through 1933.

Whitney attended the University of South Dakota College of Law and was admitted to the bar in 1911. He served in the South Dakota Senate from 1925 through 1930, and as Lieutenant Governor of South Dakota from 1931 through 1933. Whitney was appointed as a circuit court judge in 1946, and retired in 1961.
