= 1926 South Dakota gubernatorial election =

- November 2, 1926
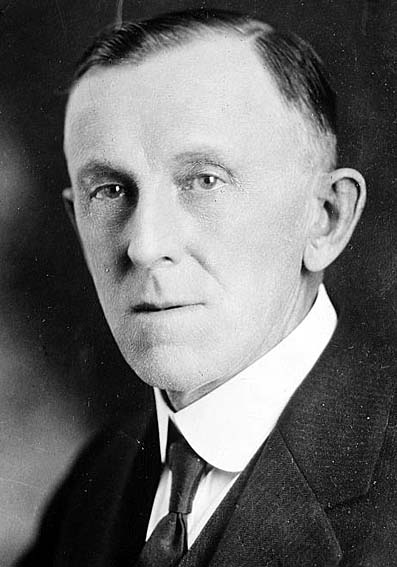

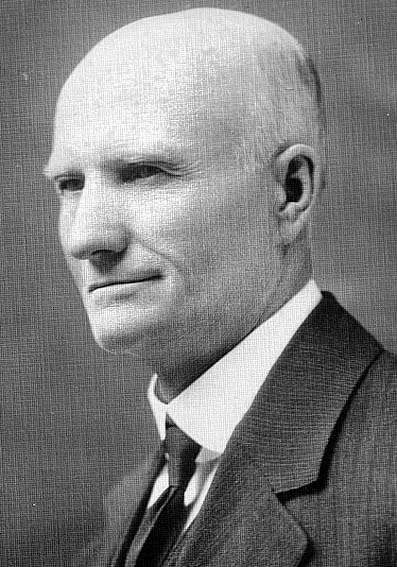
Nominee	William J. Bulow	Carl Gunderson
Party	Democratic	Republican
Popular vote	87,136	74,101
Percentage	47.40%	40.31%
Nominee	Tom Ayres	John E. Hipple
Party	Farmer–Labor	Independent
Popular vote	11,958	10,637
Percentage	6.50%	5.79%
- County results Bulow: 40–50% 50–60% 60–70% Gunderson: 40–50% 50–60% 60–70% 70–80% 80–90% Hipple: 40–50% 50–60%
Governor of South Dakota before election
Carl Gunderson
Republican
Elected Governor of South Dakota
William J. Bulow
Democratic

The 1926 South Dakota gubernatorial election was held on November 2, 1926. Incumbent Republican Governor Carl Gunderson ran for re-election to a second term. The election was largely a rematch of the 1924 election, with Gunderson's chief opponent from two years prior, Democrat William J. Bulow, challenging him once again. Two other candidates—Farmer–Labor nominee Tom Ayres and Pierre Mayor John E. Hipple, an independent—also ran. Though the left-leaning vote was split, Bulow was still able to win a decisive victory over Gunderson, whose support from two years earlier had completely collapsed.

== Democratic primary ==
=== Candidates ===
- William J. Bulow, former State Senator, former Union County Judge, former Mayor of Beresford, 1924 Democratic nominee for Governor
- Richard O. Richards, perennial candidate

=== Results ===
Democratic primary
Party	Candidate	Votes	%
Democratic	William J. Bulow	5,775	69.13%
Democratic	Richard O. Richards	2,579	30.87%
Total votes		8,354	100.00%

== Republican primary ==
=== Candidates ===
- Carl Gunderson, incumbent Governor
- C. E. Coyne, Secretary of State

=== Campaign ===
In the Republican primary, Gunderson faced a stiff challenge from Secretary of State C. E. Coyne, who lambasted the Gunderson administration for overspending, backtracking on his promises, creating a spoils system with his appointments, and committing "[f]requent blunders." Coyne's most prominent line of attack against Gunderson, however, was against the Governor's controversial reorganization of state government, which Coyne argued was a subterfuge for greed and corruption. Gunderson ultimately defeated Coyne by a decisive margin, but the difficulty he faced against Coyne presaged his weak position with the Republican base in the state.

=== Results ===
Republican primary
Party	Candidate	Votes	%
Republican	Carl Gunderson (inc.)	48,782	61.83%
Republican	C. E. Coyne	30,116	38.17%
Total votes		78,898	100.00%

== General election ==
=== Campaign ===
As the general election began, Gunderson started in a strong position, with some of the Republican newspapers in the state praising his primary victory as an "emphatic endorsement." The Lead Daily Call argued that "the voters have faith in this man of principle and honor" and "are eager to have him continue the work he has started at Pierre." The Rapid City Journal struck a similar tone, concluding that "Governor Gunderson should find great satisfaction in his vote. While he also had opposition, . . . the lack of attention paid the rival by the voters is assurance to the governor that the people want him to have a free swing at carrying out the reorganization plans which he has started." Further, the candidacy of John Hipple was seen as a blow to Bulow's chances. The Lead Daily Call predicted that Hipple was "promised several towns and several counties," splitting the anti-Gunderson vote in the general election.

But in the final weeks of the campaign, Gunderson seemed to lose ground. The South Dakota Farmers Union endorsed Bulow over Gunderson, even as it endorsed Republican Senator Peter Norbeck for re-election. An anti-Gunderson groundswell was apparently building with regular Republican voters, causing alarm in the Gunderson campaign, though it was unclear whether enough Republicans would defect to elect Bulow.

Ultimately, Bulow defeated Gunderson by a decisive margin, though he fell several points short of a majority victory. He became the state's first Democratic-affiliated candidate to win a gubernatorial election since Andrew E. Lee in 1898, and the first Democrat to serve as Governor. Even as Bulow won, however, the Republican Party's other nominees for statewide office won, and the legislature remained "overwhelmingly [R]epublican." Accordingly, despite Gunderson's loss, the Chairman of the Republican Party of South Dakota argued that "South Dakota [R]epublicans have every reason to rejoice over the election notwithstanding the fact that our candidate for the governorship was defeated." He added, "I feel it is a matter for congratulations that we have fared well."

=== Results ===
1926 South Dakota gubernatorial election
Party	Candidate	Votes	%	±%
Democratic	William J. Bulow	87,136	47.40%	+24.52%
Republican	Carl Gunderson (inc.)	74,101	40.31%	−13.58%
Farmer–Labor	Tom Ayres	11,958	6.50%	−6.75%
Independent	John E. Hipple	10,637	5.79%	—
Majority		13,035	7.09%	−23.91%
Turnout		183,832	100.00%	
Democratic gain from Republican				
