= Saint Johns Cemetery, Union County =

Catholic cemetery in South Dakota

Coordinates: 43°04′12″N 96°45′18″W

Saint Johns Cemetery
- Interactive map of Saint Johns Cemetery

Details
- Established: c. 1886
- Location: Prairie Township, Union County, South Dakota
- Type: Catholic
- No. of interments: Over 700

St. Johns Cemetery (alternatively St. John or St. John's) is a Catholic cemetery located in Prairie Township, Union County, South Dakota, with links to St. Teresa of Avila parish and church, in the Roman Catholic Diocese of Sioux Falls. The cemetery is one of a group of four adjacent cemeteries 1.2 miles south-east of Beresford, of which St. John is the is farthest west.

The earliest known burial is that of a child named Felix Phillip Mangan in 1886. As of 2001, the remains of more than 700 individuals were interred at St. John Cemetery.

== Notable people buried in St. John Cemetery ==
- William J. Bulow, South Dakota Governor and United States Senator.
- James and Frances (Kukar) Lass, parents of Donna Lass (possible victim of the Zodiac Killer).
- John W. Maher, member of the South Dakota House of Representatives.
