= 1930 South Dakota gubernatorial election =

- November 4, 1930
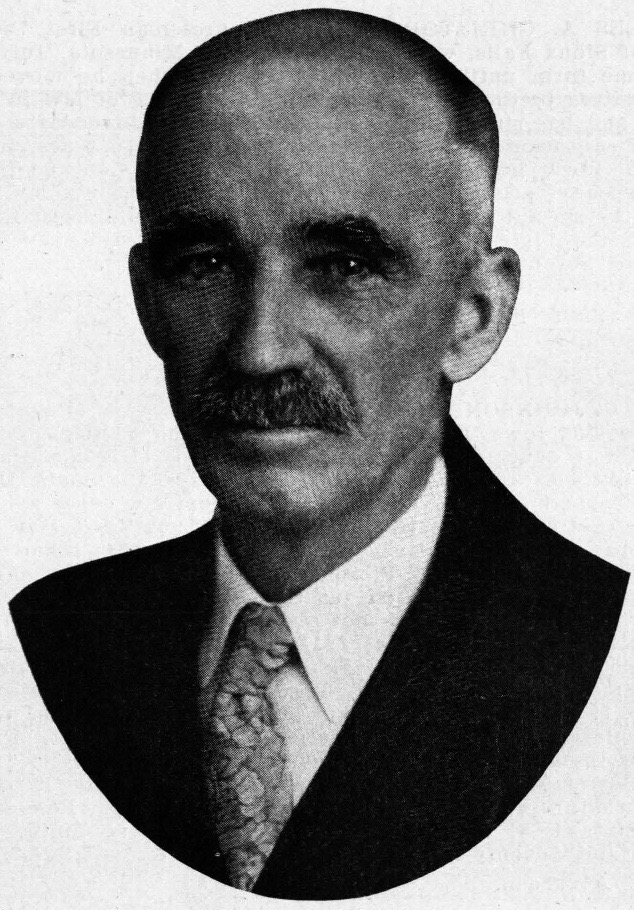

Nominee	Warren Green	D. A. McCullough
Party	Republican	Democratic
Popular vote	107,643	93,954
Percentage	52.97%	46.23%
- County results Green: 40–50% 50–60% 60–70% 70–80% 80–90% McCullough: 40–50% 50–60% >90%
Governor of South Dakota before election
William J. Bulow
Democratic
Elected Governor of South Dakota
Warren Green
Republican

The 1930 South Dakota gubernatorial election was held on November 4, 1930. Incumbent Democratic Governor William J. Bulow declined to run for re-election to a third term, instead opting to successfully run for the U.S. Senate. The Republican nomination was hard-fought and the primary was crowded; because no candidate received 35% of the vote, state law required that the nomination be decided at a state party convention. There, former State Senator Warren Green, the last-place finisher in the primary, defeated Secretary of State Gladys Pyle, the plurality winner. In the general election, Green faced D. A. McCullough, the state's Rural Credits Commissioner and the Democratic nominee. Despite Bulow's success in the preceding two elections, Green defeated McCullough by a decisive margin—even as Bulow himself was elected to the U.S. Senate.

== Democratic primary ==
=== Candidates ===
- D. A. McCullough, State Rural Credits Commissioner
- Lorenzo E. Corey, State Representative from Charles Mix County

=== Results ===
Democratic primary
Party	Candidate	Votes	%
Democratic	D. A. McCullough	11,760	56.14%
Democratic	Lorenzo E. Corey	9,186	43.86%
Total votes		20,946	100.00%

== Republican primary ==
=== Candidates ===
- Gladys Pyle, Secretary of State of South Dakota
- Carl Gunderson, former Governor of South Dakota
- Brooke Howell, State Senator from Brown County
- Carl O. Trygstad, State Senator from Brookings County
- Warren Green, former State Senator from Hamlin County, former member of the State Board of Charities and Corrections

=== Campaign ===
Following Governor Bulow's decision to run for the U.S. Senate rather than seek re-election, a crowded Republican primary developed to succeed him. When the votes were cast, Secretary of State Gladys Pyle emerged as the narrow plurality winner, but because she received less than 35% of the vote, under state law, the primary winner would be decided by a state party convention.

Pyle, as the first-place finisher in the primary, was seen by some observers as a frontrunner heading into the convention. The Huronite argued, "If the [R]epublican state convention nominates Gladys Pyle for governor, she will be elected. . . . And she would make a most excellent governor." In an editorial, the Argus Leader urged the convention to nominate her: "The smart thing for the Republican Party to do at its convention in Pierre on May 20 is to nominate Miss Gladys Pyle for Governor." But this praise was frequently backhanded; though the Argus Leader endorsed her candidacy, it also noted that "[t]he convention promises to be a colorful affair with the added novelty a woman candidate" and that "Miss Pyle's great strength is that the women voted for her. In other words, it was another manifestation of the eternal battle of the sexes. Every husband knows about it."

At the convention, following twelve ballots, Green, the last-place finisher in the primary, was nominated over Pyle. Green was finally put over the edge as the consensus choice when Howell dropped out and urged his supporters to back Green. Pyle had led most of the twelve ballots, but was unable to win enough support to receive majority support. In defeat, however, Pyle was offered the vice-chairmanship of the state party, which she declined, noting that it would be impossible for her to continue her service as Secretary of State and serve in a party leadership role.

=== Results ===
Republican primary
Party	Candidate	Votes	%
Republican	Gladys Pyle	33,153	28.29%
Republican	Carl Gunderson	31,543	26.92%
Republican	Brooke Howell	22,549	19.24%
Republican	Carl O. Trygstad	21,224	18.11%
Republican	Warren Green	8,701	7.43%
Total votes		117,170	100.00%

== General election ==
=== Results ===
1930 South Dakota gubernatorial election
Party	Candidate	Votes	%	±%
Republican	Warren Green	107,643	52.97%	+6.03%
Democratic	D. A. McCullough	93,954	46.23%	−6.25%
Independent	Helge Tangen	1,620	0.80%	—
Majority		13,689	6.74%	+1.19%
Turnout		203,217	100.00%	
Republican gain from Democratic				
