= John T. Grigsby =

American politician (1890–1977)

17th Lieutenant Governor of South Dakota
- In office 1929 – January 1931
- Governor: William J. Bulow
- Preceded by: Clarence E. Coyne
- Succeeded by: Odell K. Whitney

Personal details
- Born: John Thomas Grigsby; January 5, 1890 Sioux Falls, South Dakota, U.S.
- Died: January 14, 1977 (aged 87) Mount Vernon, Missouri, U.S.
- Resting place: Odd Fellows Cemetery, Neosho, Missouri, U.S.
- Party: Democratic
- Relatives: Sioux K. Grigsby (brother); George B. Grigsby (brother)
- Education: University of South Dakota College of Law
- Profession: Politician

Military service
- Allegiance: United States
- Branch/service: United States Army
- Rank: Captain
- Battles/wars: World War I

John Thomas Grigsby (January 5, 1890 – January 14, 1977) was an American politician. Between 1929 and 1931 he served as Lieutenant Governor of South Dakota.

== Early life and Grigsby family ==
John Grigsby was born in Sioux Falls, South Dakota. He was a brother of Sioux K. Grigsby (1873–1968) who was Lieutenant Governor of South Dakota between 1945 and 1949 and of George B. Grigsby (1974–1962) a delegate to the United States House of Representatives from the Territory of Alaska. Politically he joined the Democratic Party. His father Melvin Grigsby, was a veteran of the American Civil War and Spanish American War who served as Attorney General of South Dakota.

== Career ==
Grigsby graduated in 1903 from the University of South Dakota College of Law. He practiced law in Sioux Falls and served in the United States Army during World War I, attaining the rank of captain. He was an assistant U.S. Attorney during the administration of Woodrow Wilson, and served as city attorney of Redfield. In addition, Grigsby served on the board of directors of the state veterans home.

After the death of Lieutenant Governor Clarence E. Coyne on May 27, 1929 he was appointed to complete Coyne's unfinished term and served until January 1931. As lieutenant to Governor William J. Bulow, Grigsby's main function was to preside over the South Dakota Senate. He did not run for a full term, and returned to practicing law. He later moved to Washington, D.C. to work as an attorney for the U.S. Department of Justice.

In 1969, Grigsby retired to Carthage, Missouri. He died at the State Chest Hospital in Mount Vernon, Missouri on January 14, 1977 and was buried on the Odd Fellows Cemetery in Neosho, Missouri.

Political offices
Preceded by Clarence E. Coyne	Lieutenant Governor of South Dakota; 1929-1931	Succeeded by Odell K. Whitney
