= Alice Daly =

American educator and activist (1883–1945)

Alice Lorraine Daly
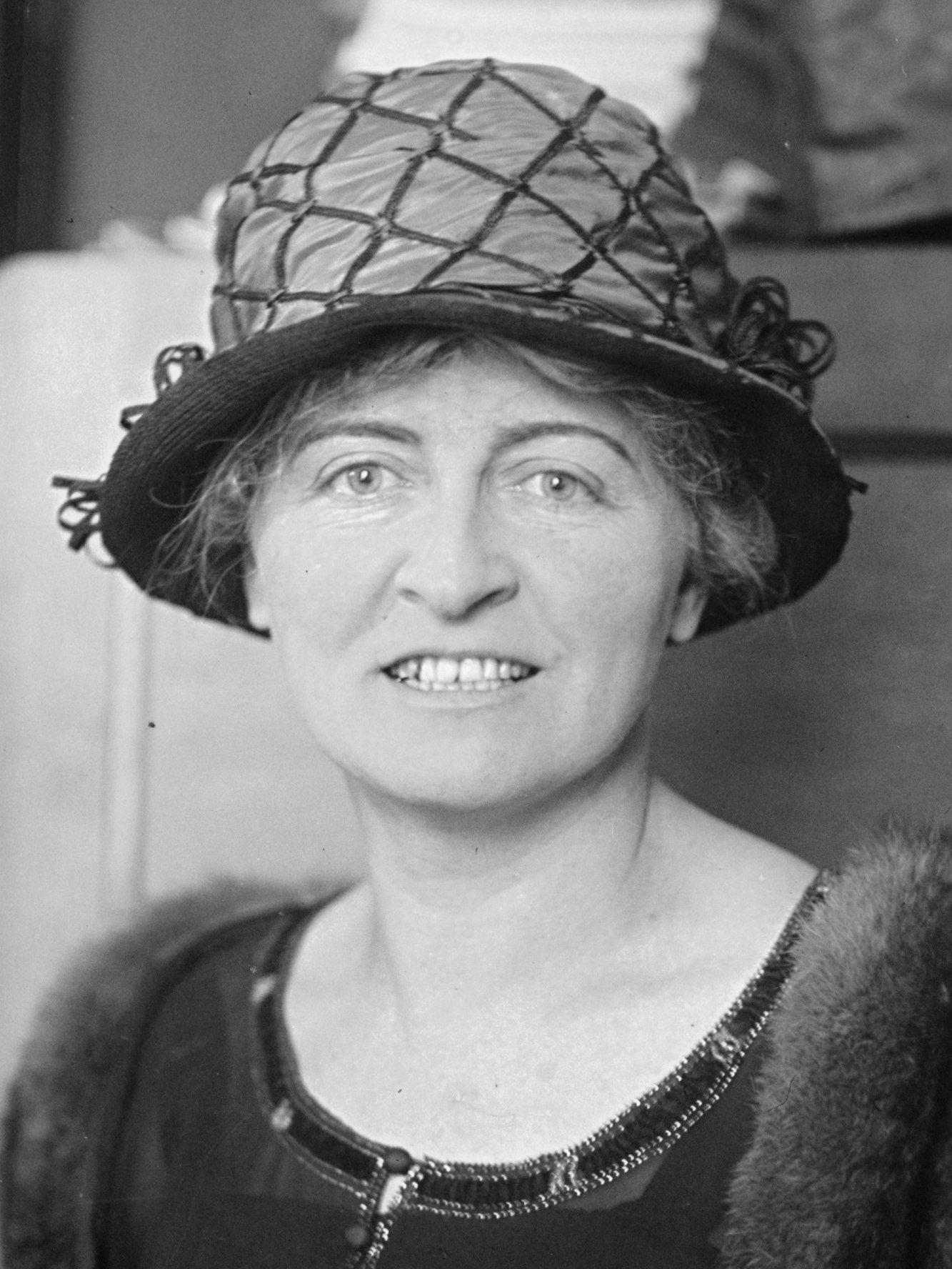
- Daly in 1922
- Born: February 11, 1883; Minnesota
- Died: October 16, 1945 (aged 62)
- Occupations: Educator, suffragist

Alice Lorraine Daly (February 11, 1883 – October 16, 1945) was an American educator, suffragist, politician, labor activist, and pacifist in South Dakota. She ran in the 1922 South Dakota gubernatorial election, receiving more than a quarter of the vote.

== Early life ==
Alice Lorraine Daly was born in Minnesota, the daughter of George H. Daly and Mary Ellen Egan. She grew up in Saint Paul, Minnesota, and attended the University of Minnesota, with additional studies at Emerson College of Oratory in Boston.

== Career ==
Daly taught in Pocatello, Idaho, as a young woman, and was an officer in the Idaho State Teachers' Association. She moved to a job at the state normal school in Madison, South Dakota, in 1915; that year, she addressed the state's suffrage convention. In 1916, she became president of the Lake County Universal Franchise League; she began touring the state giving speeches for the suffrage cause. In 1918 she and Belle Leavitt met with William Jennings Bryan while he visited Sioux Falls. In 1919 she was the first woman to speak before the South Dakota Senate.

Daly was the South Dakota chair of the Woman's Peace Party, and represented the state at the International Congress of Women, convened at The Hague in 1915. After suffrage was achieved, she was active in the League of Women Voters, the YWCA, and, during World War I, the American Red Cross and other war relief organizations. She attended the Pan-American Conference of Women in 1922, and testified at a Congressional hearing about an amendment to the Merchant-Marine Act of 1920, taking the position that it favored shipping interests over farming interests.

Daly ran for the office of state superintendent of public instruction in South Dakota in 1920. In 1922, she ran for governor of South Dakota, as the candidate of the Nonpartisan League, under the slogan "Good Housekeeping in Government." She was sometimes described as "the first woman candidate for governor in America". "My campaign will not be a campaign against anyone," she explained in 1922. "It will be a campaign against conditions, against the weakness of our present, outworn, economic system, and for a more modern system of finance, credit, public control and ownership." The Brotherhood of Locomotive Engineers endorsed her, telling its members that Daly "is the only candidate who is really the people's friend." The Railroad Telegrapher assured union members that "Miss Daly is a fearless and true friend to all who seek to make this world safe for the people who work on farms, in shops and factories, in railroads and in mines." She won over 46,000 votes, placing third. She was nominated to run for Congress in 1925 (but resigned the nomination), and chaired the Farmer-Labor Party in South Dakota for several years.

Later in life, Daly was editor of the South Dakota Free Press, and managed an apartment building in Aberdeen, South Dakota.

== Personal life ==
Daly was said to be engaged to the governor of Idaho, James H. Brady from 1911 to 1913; they did not wed. She died in 1945, aged 62 years.
