= Clarence E. Coyne =

American politician

Lieutenant Governor of South Dakota
- In office January 1929 – May 1929
- Governor: William J. Bulow
- Preceded by: Hyatt E. Covey
- Succeeded by: John T. Grigsby

Clarence E. Coyne was an American politician. A Republican, he served as the Secretary of State of South Dakota from November of 1922 to January of 1927 and as the Lieutenant Governor of South Dakota from January to May 1929. He died while in office.

== Life ==
Clarence Coyne was born in Rock Island, Illinois. He attended public schools, graduated from high school and completed a course in a business college. For four years he served in the Naval Militia of Illinois. Since 1905 he resided in South Dakota and was engaged in the newspaper business in Fort Pierre. Politically he joined the Republican Party. Between 1911 and 1914 he was the sheriff of Stanley County, and from 1922 through 1927 he served as Secretary of State of South Dakota.

In 1928, Clarence Coyne was elected to the office of the lieutenant governor of his state. He served in this position between January 1929 and his death on May 27 of the same year. In this function he was the deputy of Governor William J. Bulow, and he presided over the South Dakota Senate.

Political offices
Preceded by Hyatt E. Covey	Lieutenant Governor of South Dakota; 1929-1929	Succeeded by John T. Grigsby
