= Warren Green (South Dakota politician) =

American politician (1869–1945)

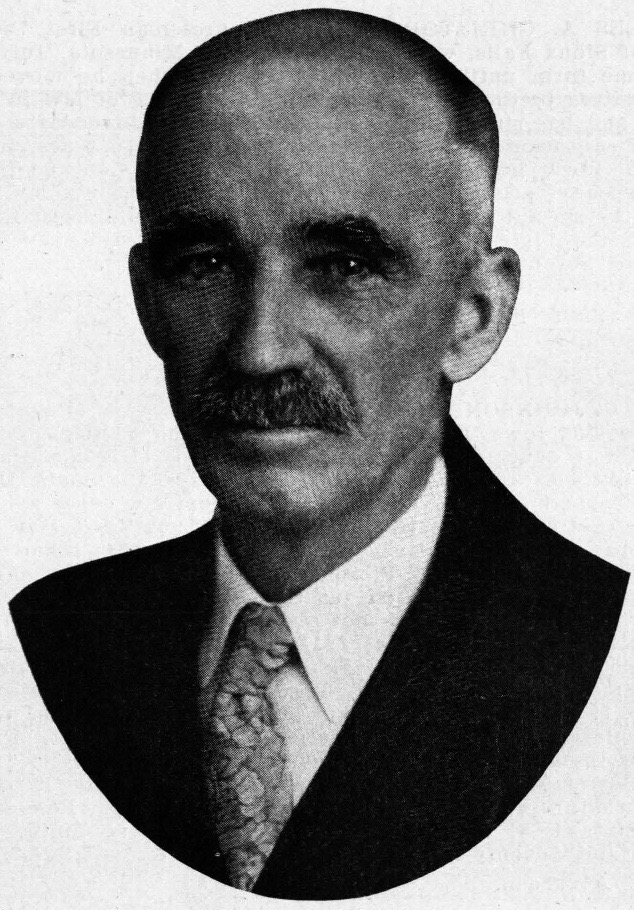

13th Governor of South Dakota
- In office January 6, 1931 – January 3, 1933
- Lieutenant: Odell K. Whitney
- Preceded by: William J. Bulow
- Succeeded by: Tom Berry

Personal details
- Born: Warren Everett Green; March 10, 1869 Jackson County, Wisconsin
- Died: April 27, 1945 (aged 76) Watertown, South Dakota
- Resting place: Mount Hope Cemetery (Watertown, South Dakota)
- Party: Republican
- Spouse: Elizabeth Parliament (m. 1899)
- Children: 4
- Profession: Farmer

Warren Everett Green (March 10, 1869 – April 27, 1945) was an American politician who served as the 13th governor of South Dakota. Green, a Republican from Hazel, South Dakota, served from 1931 to 1933. He was also a state senator from 1913 through 1915, and again from 1923 to 1927.

== Early life ==
Green was born in Jackson County, Wisconsin, the oldest of eight children. His family emigrated to Dakota Territory and settled in Hamlin County in the spring of 1881. Green grew up there and went into the farming business. He served in several local offices including twelve years as president of the local school board. He married Elizabeth Jane Parliament in 1899. They had four children.

== Career ==
Green served three terms in the state senate, South Dakota Legislature. He was elected in 1906, 1922 and 1924. He served on the South Dakota Board of Charities and Corrections from 1913 to 1920.

Green was elected governor in 1930 and took office at the beginning of the Great Depression. He inherited a massive state debt that he met with tax reform, budget reductions and the reorganization of the state's relief agencies. He reduced salaries from 10 to 20 percent and also had to deal with drought, a grasshopper plague, a crop failure and an exceptionally hard failure. He sought re-election in 1932 but was defeated by Tom Berry.

Green went back to his farm at Hazel. He was a delegate to the 1936 Republican National Convention.

== Death ==
Green moved to Watertown, where he died on April 27, 1945. He was buried in Mount Hope Cemetery, Watertown, Codington County, South Dakota.

Party political offices
| Preceded by Buell F. Jones | Republican nominee for Governor of South Dakota; 1930, 1932 | Succeeded by William C. Allen |
Political offices
| Preceded by William J. Bulow | Governor of South Dakota; 1931–1933 | Succeeded by Tom Berry |
