= 1924 Ohio gubernatorial election =

- November 4, 1924
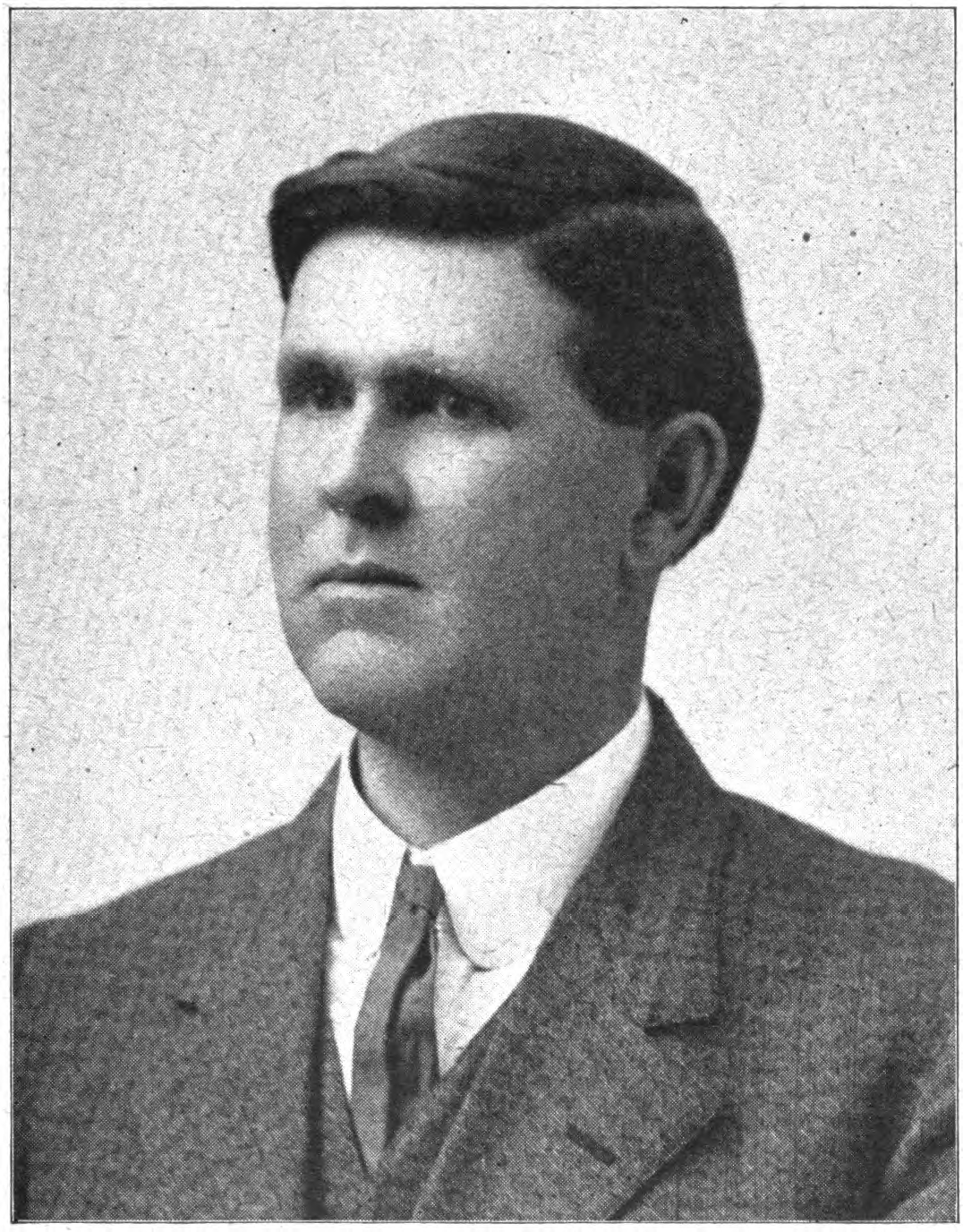

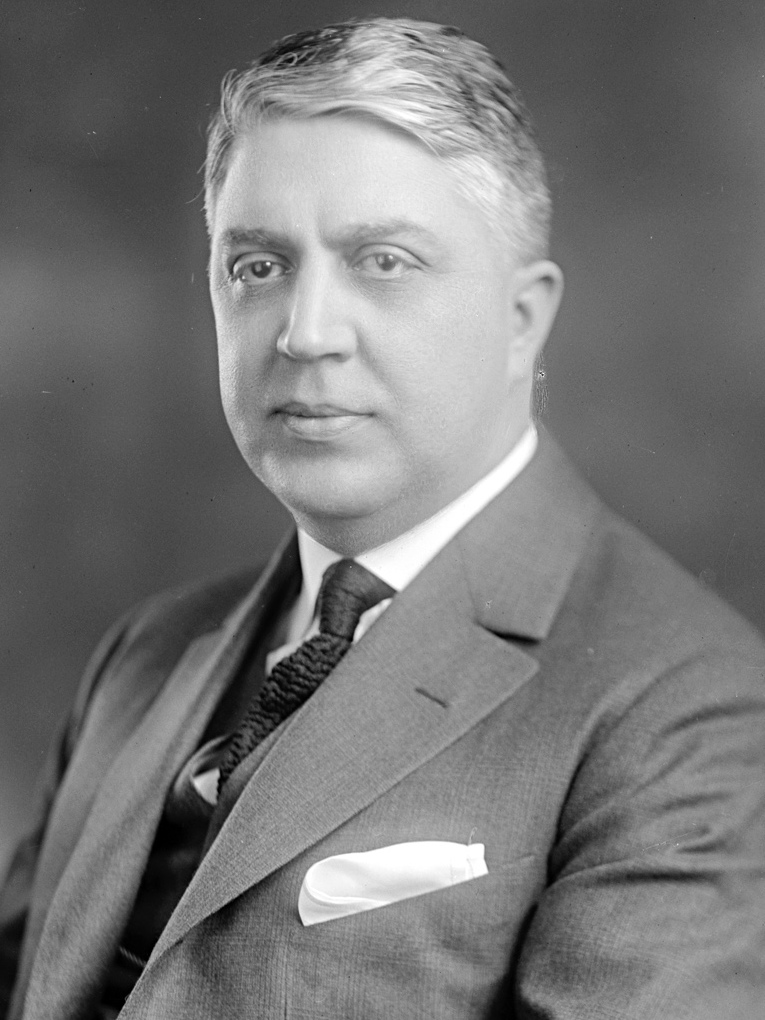
Nominee	A. Victor Donahey	Harry L. Davis
Party	Democratic	Republican
Popular vote	1,064,981	888,139
Percentage	53.97%	45.01%
- County results Donahey: 40–50% 50–60% 60–70% 70–80% Davis: 40–50% 50–60% 60–70%
Governor before election
A. Victor Donahey
Democratic
Elected Governor
A. Victor Donahey
Democratic

The 1924 Ohio gubernatorial election was held on November 4, 1924. Incumbent Democrat A. Victor Donahey defeated Republican nominee Harry L. Davis with 53.97% of the vote.

== General election ==
=== Candidates ===
Major party candidates

- A. Victor Donahey, Democratic
- Harry L. Davis, Republican

Other candidates

- Virgil D. Allen, Commonwealth Land
- Franklin J. Catlin, Socialist Labor

=== Results ===
1924 Ohio gubernatorial election
Party	Candidate	Votes	%	±%
Democratic	A. Victor Donahey (incumbent)	1,064,981	53.97%	
Republican	Harry L. Davis	888,139	45.01%	
Independent	Virgil D. Allen	11,776	0.60%	
Socialist Labor	Franklin J. Catlin	8,468	0.43%	
Majority		176,842		
Turnout				
Democratic hold		Swing		
