= 1924 United States elections =

- ← 1922 1923 1924 1925 1926 → Presidential election year
- Election day: November 4
- Incumbent president: ▌Calvin Coolidge (R)
- Next Congress: 69th

Presidential election
- Partisan control: Republican hold
- Popular vote margin: Republican +25.2%
- Electoral vote
- Calvin Coolidge (R): 382
- John W. Davis (D): 136
- Robert La Follette (P): 13
- 1924 presidential election results. Red denotes states won by Coolidge, blue denotes states won by Davis, and light green denotes states won by La Follette. Numbers indicate the electoral votes won by each candidate.

Senate elections
- Overall control: Republican hold
- Seats contested: 34 of 96 seats (32 Class 2 seats + 4 special elections)
- Net seat change: Republican +4
- 1924 Senate election results Democratic gain Democratic hold Republican gain Republican hold

House elections
- Overall control: Republican hold
- Seats contested: All 435 voting members
- Net seat change: Republican +22
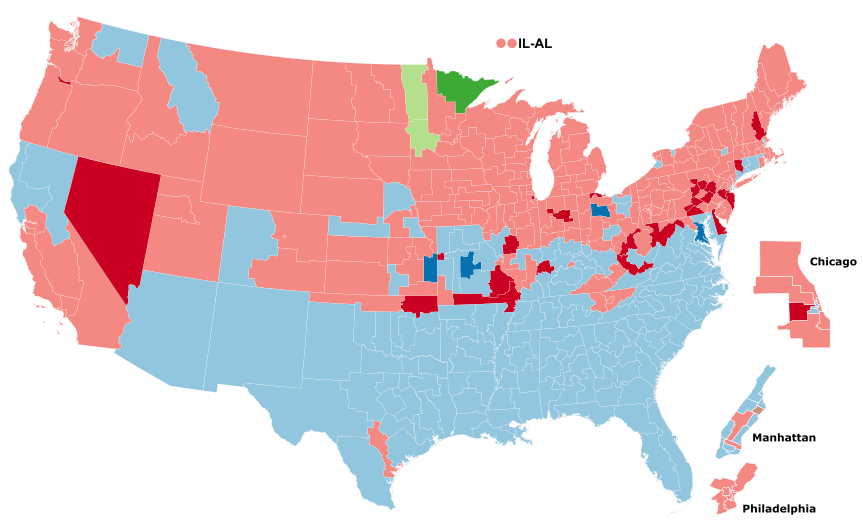
- 1924 House of Representatives results

Gubernatorial elections
- Seats contested: 36
- Net seat change: Republican +2
- 1924 gubernatorial election results Democratic gain Democratic hold Republican gain Republican hold

Elections were held on November 4, 1924. The Republican Party retained control of the presidency and both chambers of the United States Congress.

In the presidential election, Republican President Calvin Coolidge (who took office on August 2, 1923, upon the death of his predecessor, Warren G. Harding) was elected to serve a full term, defeating Democratic nominee, former Ambassador John W. Davis and Progressive Senator Robert M. La Follette, Sr. from Wisconsin. Coolidge easily won the election, taking almost every state outside the Solid South. Davis won the Democratic nomination after a record 103 ballots, emerging as a compromise candidate between Treasury Secretary William Gibbs McAdoo and New York Governor Al Smith. La Follette, a former Republican who had sought the 1912 Republican nomination, drew 16% of the popular vote and won his home state of Wisconsin.

The Republicans gained twenty-two seats in the House of Representatives, increasing their majority over the Democrats. The Republicans also furthered a majority in the Senate, gaining four seats from the Democrats.

== See also ==
- 1924 United States presidential election
- 1924 United States House of Representatives elections
- 1924 United States Senate elections
- 1924 United States gubernatorial elections
