= Alva Clark Forney =

American politician

A. Clark Forney (February 25, 1871 – April 11, 1956) was the 14th Lieutenant Governor of South Dakota from 1925 to 1927 serving under Governor Carl Gunderson. He was a member of the Republican Party.

== Biography ==
Forney was born in Holt County, Missouri, and came to South Dakota in 1889, settling at Hill City. He was a veteran of the Spanish–American War. He went into the farming and stock raising business at Oelrichs and was treasurer of Fall River County, South Dakota in 1905-1909. He was a United States Commissioner from 1907 to 1917, and served in the state senate of the South Dakota Legislature from 1921 to 1925. He was elected lieutenant governor in 1924.

== Notes ==
Political offices
| Preceded by Carl Gunderson | Lieutenant Governor of South Dakota; 1925–1927 | Succeeded by Hyatt E. Covey |
