= 1924 South Dakota gubernatorial election =

- November 4, 1924
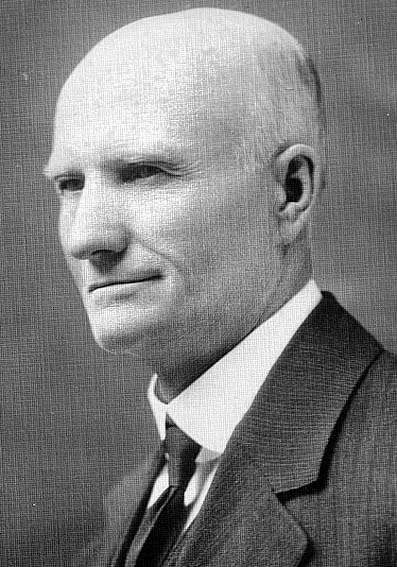

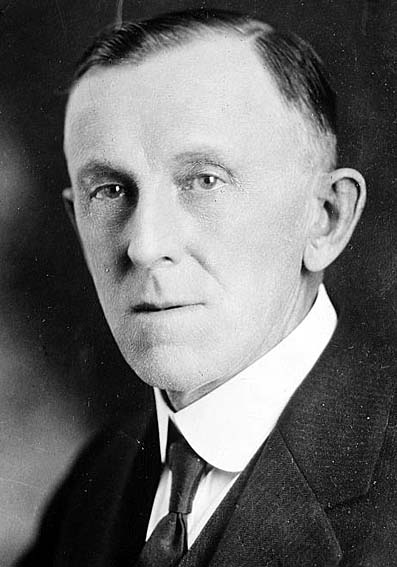
Nominee	Carl Gunderson	William J. Bulow
Party	Republican	Democratic
Popular vote	109,894	46,663
Percentage	53.88%	22.88%
Nominee	A. L. Putnam	Richard O. Richards
Party	Farmer–Labor	Independent
Popular vote	27,027	20,259
Percentage	13.25%	9.98%
- County results Gunderson: 30–40% 40–50% 50–60% 60–70% 70–80% 80–90% >90% Bulow: 40–50% 60–70% Putnam: 40–50%
Governor of South Dakota before election
William H. McMaster
Republican
Elected Governor of South Dakota
Carl Gunderson
Republican

The 1924 South Dakota gubernatorial election was held on November 4, 1924. Incumbent Republican Governor William H. McMaster declined to run for re-election to a third term, instead opting to run for the U.S. Senate. Lieutenant Governor Carl Gunderson won the Republican primary unopposed. In the general election, he faced three prominent opponents: Democratic nominee William J. Bulow, a former State Senator and Mayor of Beresford; Farmer–Labor nominee A. L. Putnam; and perennial candidate Richard O. Richards. Gunderson. Gunderson won the election in a landslide.

== Primary elections ==
=== Democratic primary ===
==== Candidates ====
- Andrew S. Anderson, former State Senator from Clay County
- Eric J. Ellefson, State Senator from Minnehaha County

==== Results ====
Democratic primary
Party	Candidate	Votes	%
Democratic	Andrew S. Anderson	7,437	73.01%
Democratic	Eric J. Ellefson	2,749	26.99%
Total votes		10,186	100.00%

On August 11, 1924, Anderson was killed by a bull on his farm. The South Dakota Democratic Party's central committee met to select a replacement for Anderson on August 20, 1924. However, few candidates wanted to accept the nomination. State Senator John B. Johnson declined to be a candidate, though the committee viewed him as their preferred candidate. Ultimately, William J. Bulow—a former State Senator, Union County Judge, and Mayor of Beresford—was selected by the committee as its replacement nominee.

=== Republican primary ===
Lieutenant Governor Carl Gunderson was the only Republican candidate to file for Governor, removing the race from the primary election ballot.

=== Farmer–Labor primary ===
==== Candidates ====
- A. L. Putnam
- Eric J. Ellefson, State Senator from Minnehaha County

==== Results ====
Farmer–Labor primary
Party	Candidate	Votes	%
Farmer–Labor	A. L. Putnam	2,973	70.92%
Farmer–Labor	Eric J. Ellefson	1,219	29.08%
Total votes		4,192	100.00%

== General election ==
=== Results ===
1924 South Dakota gubernatorial election
Party	Candidate	Votes	%	±%
Republican	Carl Gunderson	109,894	53.88%	+8.86%
Democratic	William J. Bulow	46,663	22.88%	−5.85%
Farmer–Labor	A. L. Putnam	27,027	13.25%	—
Independent	Richard O. Richards	20,359	9.98%	—
Majority		63,231	31.00%	+14.72%
Turnout		203,943	100.00%	
Republican hold				
