= William H. McMaster =

American politician from South Dakota (1877–1968)

William Henry McMaster
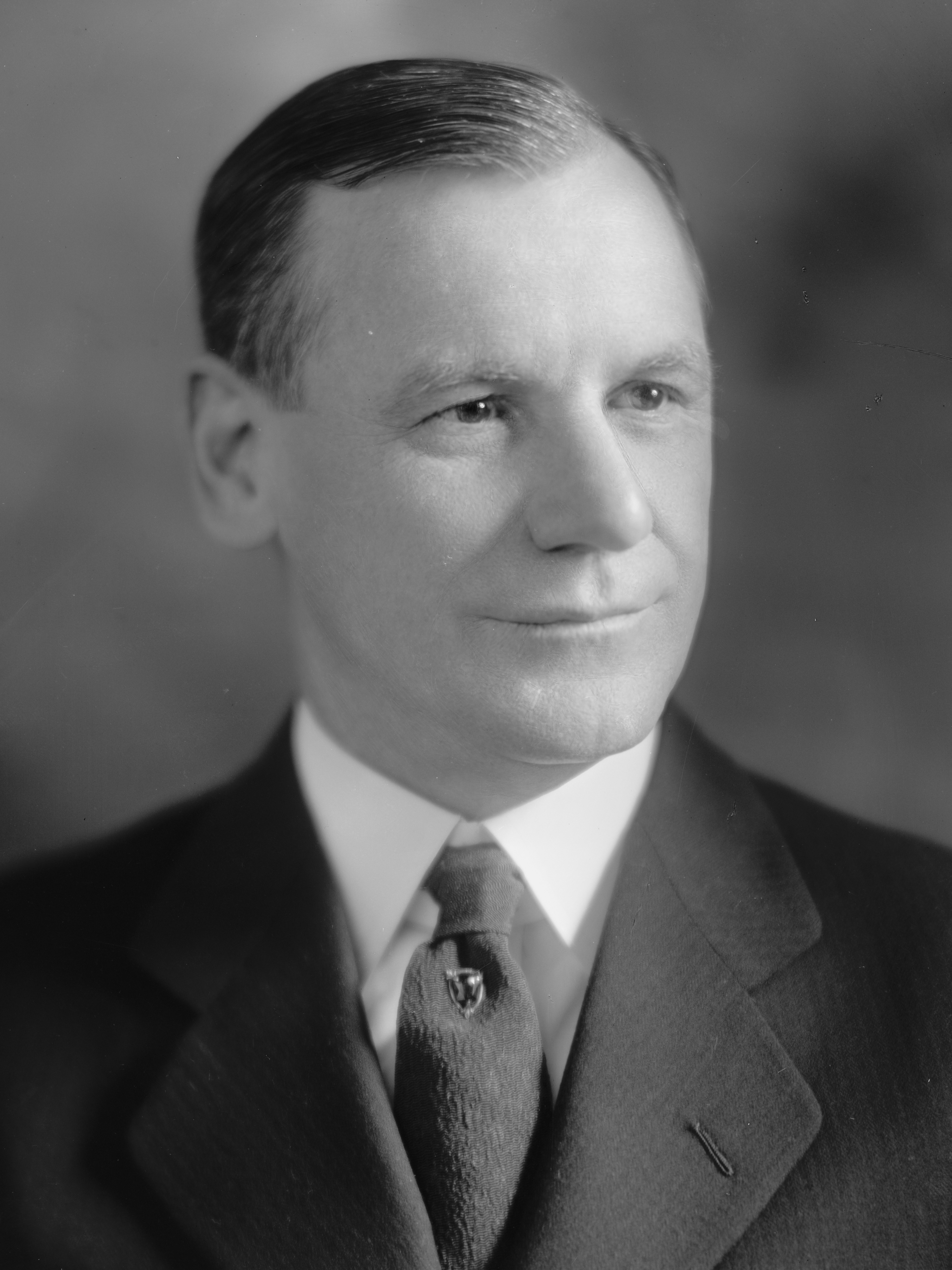

United States Senator from South Dakota
- In office March 4, 1925 – March 3, 1931
- Preceded by: Thomas Sterling
- Succeeded by: William J. Bulow

10th Governor of South Dakota
- In office January 4, 1921 – January 6, 1925
- Lieutenant: Carl Gunderson
- Preceded by: Peter Norbeck
- Succeeded by: Carl Gunderson

12th Lieutenant Governor of South Dakota
- In office January 2, 1917 – January 4, 1921
- Governor: Peter Norbeck
- Preceded by: Peter Norbeck
- Succeeded by: Carl Gunderson

Member of the South Dakota Senate
- In office 1913–1916

Member of the South Dakota House of Representatives
- In office 1911–1912

Personal details
- Born: May 10, 1877 Ticonic, Iowa, U.S.
- Died: September 14, 1968 (aged 91) Dixon, Illinois, U.S.
- Party: Republican
- Spouse: Harriet Russell
- Education: Beloit College
- Profession: Banker

William Henry McMaster (May 10, 1877 – September 14, 1968) was an American politician who served as the tenth governor of South Dakota from 1921 until 1925. A member of the Republican Party, he went on to serve as a member of the United States Senate from South Dakota from 1925 to 1931.

== Biography ==
McMaster was born to Samuel and Sara (Woodsum) McMaster in Ticonic, Iowa. His family moved to Sioux City, Iowa after the death of his father in 1880; and while growing up, he contributed to the family income by delivering the morning edition of the "Sioux City Journal." McMaster graduated from Sioux City High School and in 1899, he received a B.A. degree from Beloit College in Wisconsin. McMaster served as the head football coach at the University of Wisconsin–Oshkosh, then known as Oshkosh Normal School in 1899.

== Career ==
McMaster moved to Gayville, South Dakota, and entered the banking industry, serving as the cashier of the Bank of Gayville. He was elected Gayville City Treasurer in 1905 and was re-elected in 1907.

He was elected to the South Dakota House of Representatives from Yankton County in 1910. He was then elected to the State Senate in 1912, and was re-elected in 1914.

In 1916, McMaster ran for Lieutenant Governor. He defeated fellow State Senator E. C. Miller and former State Representative T S. Everitt in the Republican primary, and then defeated the Democratic nominee, State Senator Andrew S. Anderson, in the general election with 55% of the vote. He was re-elected in a landslide in 1918, receiving 52% of the vote to Nonpartisan League nominee A. L. Putnam's 27% and Democratic nominee C. C. Siderius's 20%.

In 1920, with Governor Peter Norbeck opting to run for the U.S. Senate rather than seek re-election, McMaster entered the race to succeed him. He won the Republican primary over perennial candidate Richard O. Richards and faced two prominent candidates—Nonpartisan League nominee Mark P. Bates and Democratic nominee William W. Howes—in the general election. Benefiting from the split field, McMaster won the election in a landslide, receiving 56% of the vote. He ran for re-election in 1922, and though he faced a similarly split field, his victory was considerably narrower; he won only 45% of the vote. As Governor, he revised the state tax code, provided state-guaranteed credit, and fought a successful battle against high gasoline taxes.

McMaster declined to seek a third term in 1924 and instead ran for the U.S. Senate. He defeated incumbent Senator Thomas Sterling in the Republican primary and won a 44% plurality in the ensuing general election against Democratic nominee Ulysses Simpson Grant Cherry and several independent candidates. He was narrowly defeated for re-election in 1930 by Governor William J. Bulow. In retirement, he served as an officer of the Dixon National Bank in Illinois.

== Death ==
At the age of 91 years, McMaster died in Yankton and was interred in Oakwood Cemetery, Dixon, Lee County, Illinois US.

== Head coaching record ==
Year	Team	Overall	Conference	Standing	Bowl/playoffs
Oshkosh Normal (Independent) (1899)
1899	Oshkosh Normal	1–6–1			
Oshkosh Normal:		1–6–1			
Total:		1–6–1			

Party political offices
Preceded by Peter Norbeck	Republican nominee for Governor of South Dakota; 1920, 1922	Succeeded by Carl Gunderson
Preceded by Thomas Sterling	Republican nominee for U.S. Senator from South Dakota (Class 2); 1924, 1930	Succeeded by John Chandler Gurney
Political offices
Preceded by Peter Norbeck	Lieutenant Governor of South Dakota; 1917–1921	Succeeded by Carl Gunderson
Preceded by Peter Norbeck	Governor of South Dakota; 1921–1925	Succeeded by Carl Gunderson
U.S. Senate
Preceded by Thomas Sterling	United States Senator (Class 2) from South Dakota; 1925–1931	Succeeded by William J. Bulow
