= William J. Bulow =

American politician from South Dakota (1869–1960)

William John Bulow
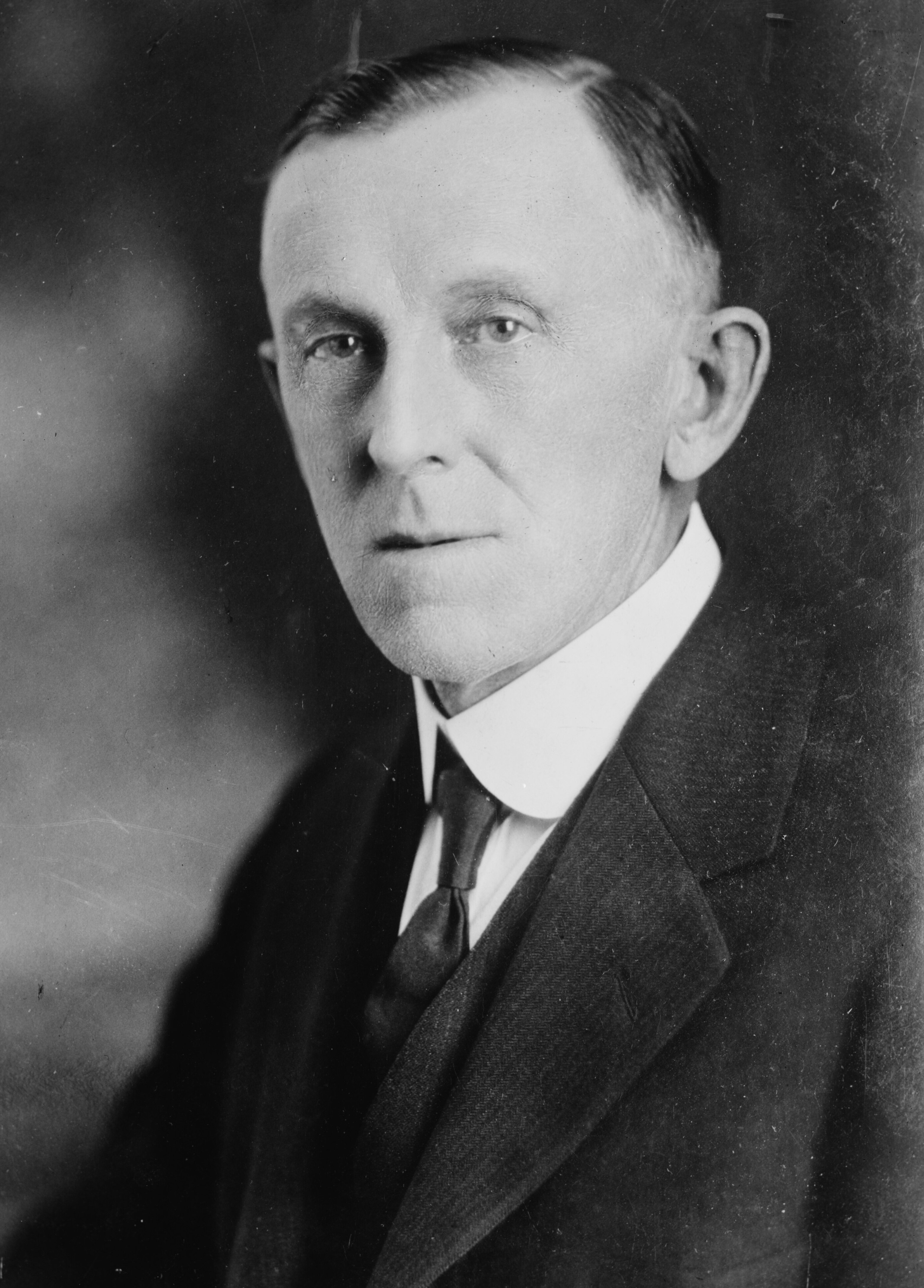

United States Senator from South Dakota
- In office March 4, 1931 – January 3, 1943
- Preceded by: William H. McMaster
- Succeeded by: Harlan J. Bushfield

12th Governor of South Dakota
- In office January 4, 1927 – January 6, 1931
- Lieutenant: Hyatt E. Covey; Clarence E. Coyne; John T. Grigsby
- Preceded by: Carl Gunderson
- Succeeded by: Warren Green

Member of the South Dakota Senate
- In office 1899

Personal details
- Born: January 13, 1869 Moscow, Ohio, U.S.
- Died: February 26, 1960 (aged 91) Washington, D.C., U.S.
- Party: Democratic
- Spouses: Katherine Reedy; Sarah Johnson Farrand
- Education: University of Michigan
- Profession: Attorney

William John Bulow (January 13, 1869 – February 26, 1960) was an American politician and lawyer. He was the first Democrat to serve as Governor of South Dakota, from 1927 to 1931. He received the highest number of votes of any Democratic candidate for governor in the state up to that time. Bulow then went on to serve as a member of the United States Senate from South Dakota from 1931 to 1943.

== Early life ==
Bulow was born of German ancestry to Joseph and Elizabeth (Ebendorf) Bulow near Moscow in Clermont County, Ohio, where he was raised and educated. In 1893, he graduated with a law degree from the University of Michigan. He was twice married: to Katherine J. Reedy and to Sarah (Johnson) Farrand.

== Career ==
During 1893, Bulow moved to South Dakota. He resided in Sioux Falls, where he worked for the Joe Kirby office. Then, he came by horse and carriage to Beresford, where he set up his own law office and helped to develop the town. He was elected to the state senate of the South Dakota Legislature in 1898. While residing in Beresford, Bulow spent twenty-five years as city attorney from 1902 to 1927, except while serving as mayor from 1912 to 1913. He also served as County Judge for Beresford in 1918.

In 1924, following the death of the Democratic Party's gubernatorial nominee, Bulow was selected as the Party's replacement nominee. Bulow lost the general election in a landslide to Republican Lieutenant Governor Carl Gunderson as a Farmer–Labor Party candidate siphoned off a significant share of the left-leaning vote. In 1926, Bulow defeated Gunderson for re-election, and he was re-elected in 1928. As governor, he pardoned the famous frontier gambler Poker Alice after her conviction of bootlegging and other charges related to running a house of prostitution.

In 1930, rather than seek re-election as Governor, Bulow ran for the U.S. Senate, and he narrowly defeated incumbent Senator William H. McMaster in the general election. He was narrowly re-elected in 1936. In 1942, however, Bulow faced strong opposition in the Democratic primary due to his opposition to the foreign policy of President Franklin D. Roosevelt. He lost renomination to former Governor Tom Berry in a landslide.

During his entire life, Bulow kept a legal residence in Beresford, South Dakota and voted by absentee ballot. After his loss in 1942, Bulow retired and spent the rest of his life residing in Washington, D.C. Bulow spent his last few years in failing health and was blind during his last four years. He was a member of the Alfalfa Club.

Beresford honored William J. Bulow in 1959 during the town's seventy-five year jubilee observance. The city's park was dedicated as "Bulow Park" on June 3, 1959.

== Death and legacy ==
Almost nine months later, Bulow died in Washington, D.C.; his body was returned to Beresford for burial at the St. John Catholic Cemetery, where he was interred next to his first wife, Katherine (Reedy) Bulow. Years later, Bulow's house in Beresford, South Dakota was declared a historic landmark (Governor William J. Bulow House).

Party political offices
Preceded by Louis N. Crill	Democratic nominee for Governor of South Dakota; 1924, 1926, 1928	Succeeded by D. A. McCullough
Preceded by U. S. G. Cherry	Democratic nominee for U.S. Senator from South Dakota (Class 2); 1930, 1936	Succeeded by Tom Berry
Political offices
Preceded by Ole Ofstad	Mayor of Beresford, South Dakota; 1912–1913	Succeeded by S. O. Steensland
Preceded by Carl Gunderson	Governor of South Dakota; 1927–1931	Succeeded by Warren Green
U.S. Senate
Preceded by William H. McMaster	United States Senator (Class 2) from South Dakota; 1931–1943	Succeeded by Harlan J. Bushfield
