= 1930 United States Senate election in South Dakota =

- November 4, 1930
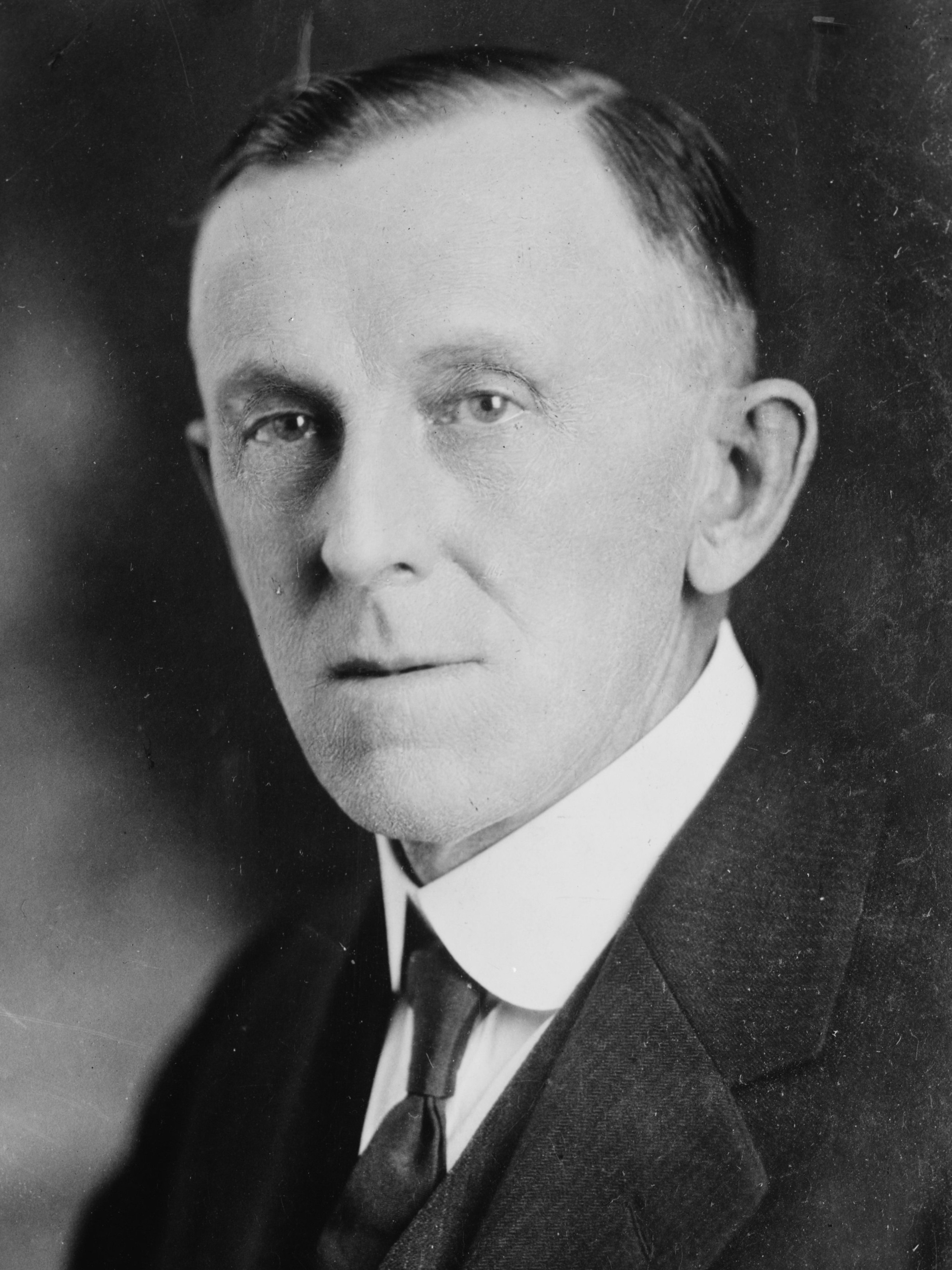

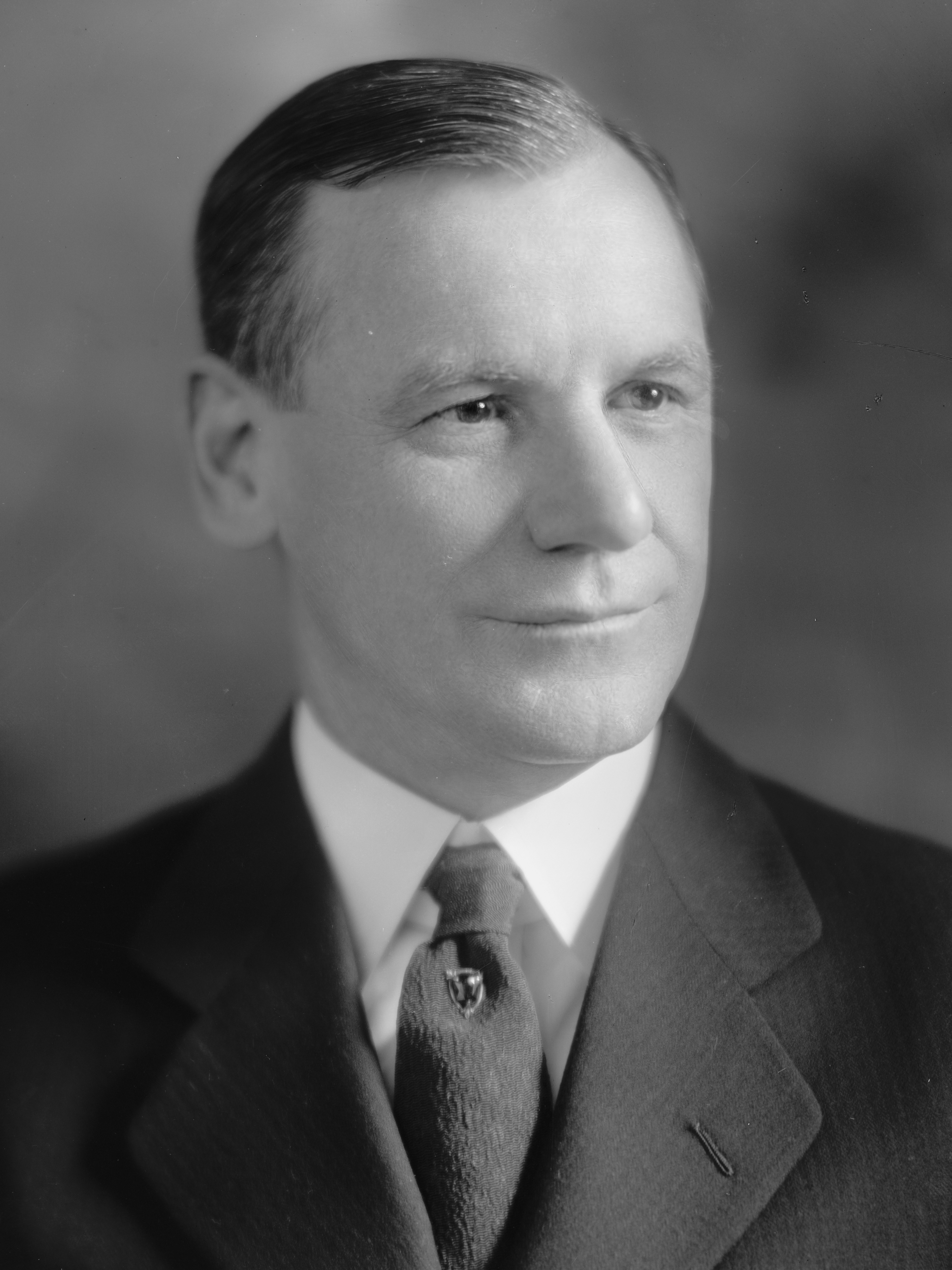
Nominee	William J. Bulow	William H. McMaster
Party	Democratic	Republican
Popular vote	106,317	99,595
Percentage	51.63%	48.37%
- County results Bulow: 50–60% 60–70% >90% McMaster: 50–60% 60–70% 70–80%
U.S. senator before election
William H. McMaster
Republican
Elected U.S. Senator
William J. Bulow
Democratic

The 1930 United States Senate election in South Dakota took place on November 4, 1930. Incumbent Republican Senator William H. McMaster ran for re-election to a second term. After beating back a challenge in the Republican primary from former State Senator George J. Danforth, McMaster faced Democratic nominee William J. Bulow, the incumbent Governor, in the general election. As the Democratic Party performed well nationwide, Bulow narrowly defeated McMaster.

== Democratic primary ==
=== Candidates ===
- William J. Bulow, Governor of South Dakota
- James McNamara, former State Senator from Beadle County

=== Results ===
Democratic primary
Party	Candidate	Votes	%
Democratic	William J. Bulow	16,520	73.88%
Democratic	James McNamara	5,840	26.12%
Total votes		22,360	100.00%

== Republican primary ==
=== Candidates ===
- William H. McMaster, incumbent U.S. Senator
- George J. Danforth, former State Senator from Minnehaha County

=== Results ===
Republican primary
Party	Candidate	Votes	%
Republican	William H. McMaster (inc.)	64,331	55.92%
Republican	George J. Danforth	50,717	44.08%
Total votes		115,048	100.00%

== General election ==
=== Results ===
1930 United States Senate election in South Dakota
Party	Candidate	Votes	%	±%
Democratic	William J. Bulow	106,317	51.63%	+20.39%
Republican	William H. McMaster (inc.)	99,595	48.37%	+4.24%
Majority		6,722	3.26%	−9.62%
Turnout		205,912		
Democratic gain from Republican				
