= 1920 South Dakota gubernatorial election =

- November 2, 1920
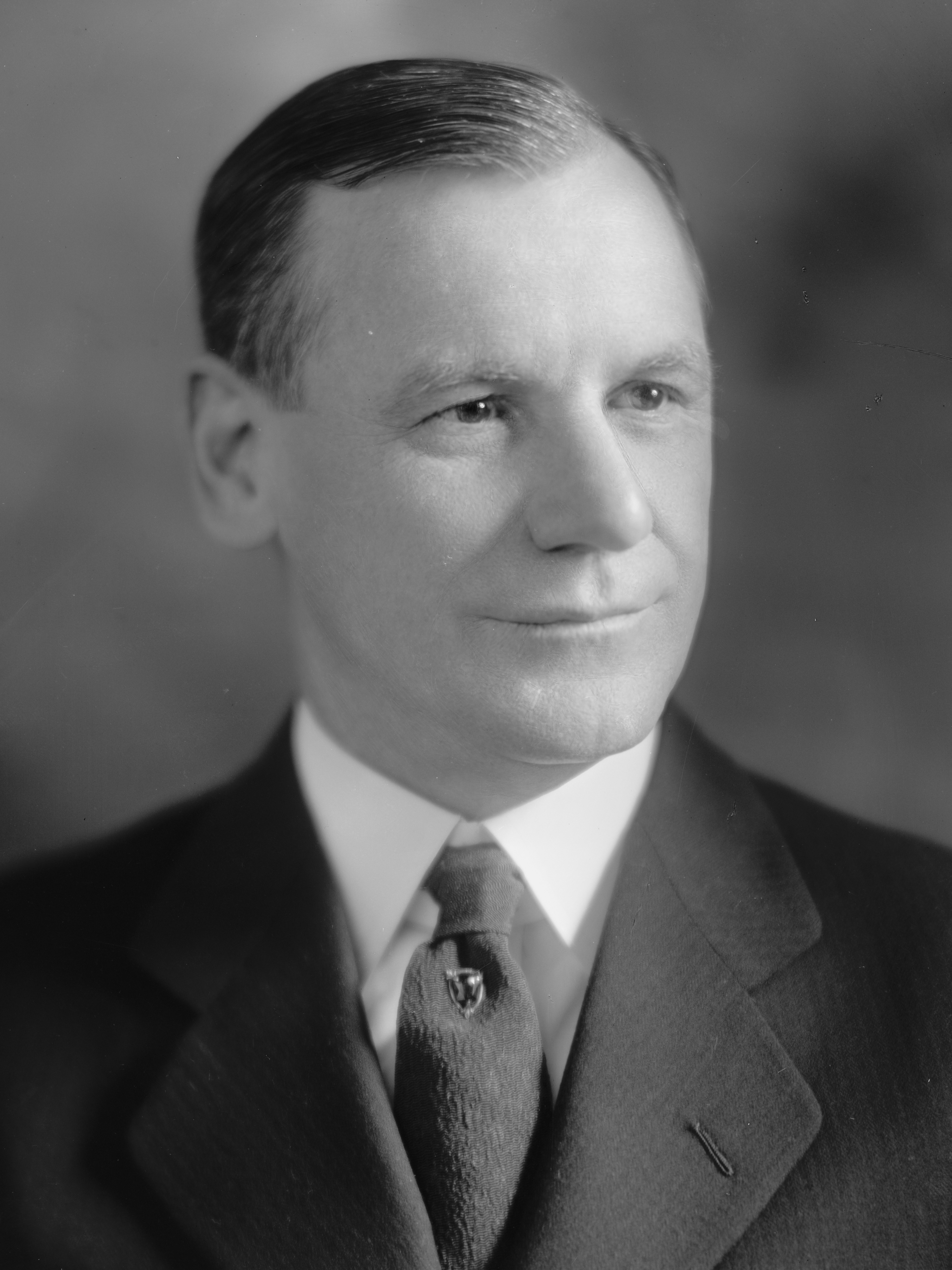

Nominee	William H. McMaster	Mark P. Bates	William W. Howes
Party	Republican	Nonpartisan League	Democratic
Popular vote	103,592	48,426	31,870
Percentage	56.33%	26.12%	17.33%
- County results McMaster: 40–50% 50–60% 60–70% 70–80% Bates: 40–50% 50–60%
Governor of South Dakota before election
Peter Norbeck
Republican
Elected Governor of South Dakota
William H. McMaster
Republican

The 1920 South Dakota gubernatorial election was held on November 2, 1920. Incumbent Republican Governor Peter Norbeck declined to run for re-election, instead choosing to run for the U.S. Senate. Lieutenant Governor William H. McMaster won the Republican primary and advanced to the general election, where he faced Nonpartisan League candidate Mark P. Bates and former State Senator William W. Howes, the Democratic nominee. The election was largely a replay of the 1918 election, with McMaster winning a large victory, Bates coming in second, and Howes coming in a distant third.

== Primary elections ==
=== Democratic primary ===
Former State Senator William W. Howes, who previously represented Beadle County in the State Senate, won the Democratic nomination unopposed and the race did not appear on the primary election ballot.

=== Republican primary ===
==== Candidates ====
- William H. McMaster, Lieutenant Governor
- Richard O. Richards, perennial candidate

==== Results ====
Republican primary
Party	Candidate	Votes	%
Republican	William H. McMaster	47,508	61.13%
Republican	Richard O. Richards	30,203	38.87%
Total votes		77,711	100.00%

== General election ==
=== Results ===
1920 South Dakota gubernatorial election
Party	Candidate	Votes	%	±%
Republican	William H. McMaster	103,592	56.33%	+3.12%
Nonpartisan League	Mark P. Bates	48,426	26.33%	+0.21%
Democratic	William W. Howes	31,870	17.33%	−1.24%
Majority		55,166	30.00%	+2.90%
Turnout		183,888		
Republican hold				
