= 1924 United States Senate election in South Dakota =

- November 4, 1924
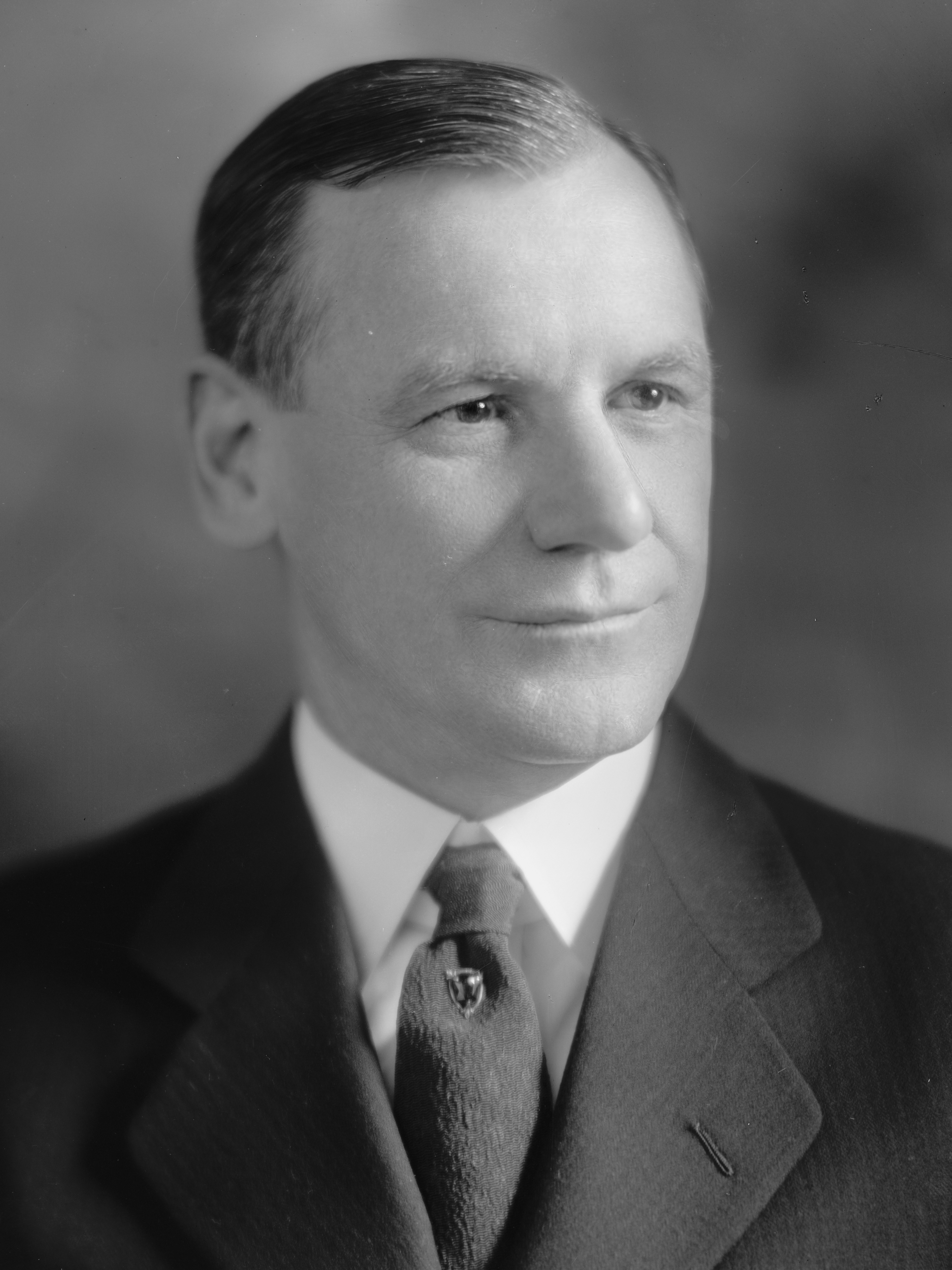

Nominee	William H. McMaster	Ulysses Cherry
Party	Republican	Democratic
Popular vote	90,006	63,728
Percentage	44.13%	31.24%
Nominee	Tom Ayres	George W. Egan
Party	Farmer–Labor	Independent
Popular vote	20,952	14,484
Percentage	10.27%	7.10%
- County results McMaster: 30–40% 40–50% 50–60% 60–70% 70–80% 80–90% Cherry: 30–40% 40–50% 50–60% Ayres: 40–50% No Vote
U.S. senator before election
Thomas Sterling
Republican
Elected U.S. Senator
William H. McMaster
Republican

The 1924 United States Senate election in South Dakota took place on November 4, 1924. Incumbent Senator Thomas Sterling ran for re-election to a third term, but he was defeated in the Republican primary by Governor William H. McMaster. In the general election, McMaster was opposed by attorney Ulysses Simpson Grant Cherry, the Democratic nominee, and several independent candidates. McMaster defeated his opponents by a wide margin, but fell far short of a majority, winning only 44% of the vote.

== Democratic primary ==
=== Candidates ===
- Ulysses Simpson Grant Cherry, Sioux Falls attorney, 1920 Democratic nominee for the U.S. Senate
- Mark P. Bates

=== Results ===
Democratic primary
Party	Candidate	Votes	%
Democratic	Ulysses Simpson Grant Cherry	7,103	68.44%
Democratic	Mark P. Bates	3,276	31.56%
Total votes		10,379	100.00%

== Republican primary ==
=== Candidates ===
- William H. McMaster, former Governor of South Dakota
- Thomas Sterling, incumbent U.S. Senator

=== Results ===
Republican primary
Party	Candidate	Votes	%
Republican	William H. McMaster	45,213	58.34%
Republican	Thomas Sterling (inc.)	32,292	41.66%
Total votes		77,505	100.00%

== Farmer–Labor Primary ==
=== Candidates ===
- Tom Ayres
- Mark P. Bates

=== Results ===
Farmer–Labor primary
Party	Candidate	Votes	%
Farmer–Labor	Tom Ayres	2,827	64.71%
Farmer–Labor	Mark P. Bates	1,542	31.56%
Total votes		4,369	100.00%

== General election ==
=== Results ===
1924 United States Senate election in South Dakota
Party	Candidate	Votes	%	±%
Republican	William H. McMaster	90,006	44.13%	−10.94%
Democratic	Ulysses Simpson Grant Cherry	63,728	31.24%	−7.70%
Farmer–Labor	Tom Ayres	20,952	10.27%	—
Independent	George W. Egan	14,484	7.10%	—
Independent	Mark P. Bates	8,442	4.14%	—
Independent	C. H. Dillon	3,835	1.88%	—
Independent	H. L. Loucks	1,378	0.68%	—
Independent	Don Livingston	1,138	0.56%	—
Majority		26,278	12.88%	−3.24%
Turnout		203,963	100.00%	
Republican hold				
