= 1932 Farmer–Labor National Convention =

1932 Farmer-Labor National Convention
- 1932 presidential election
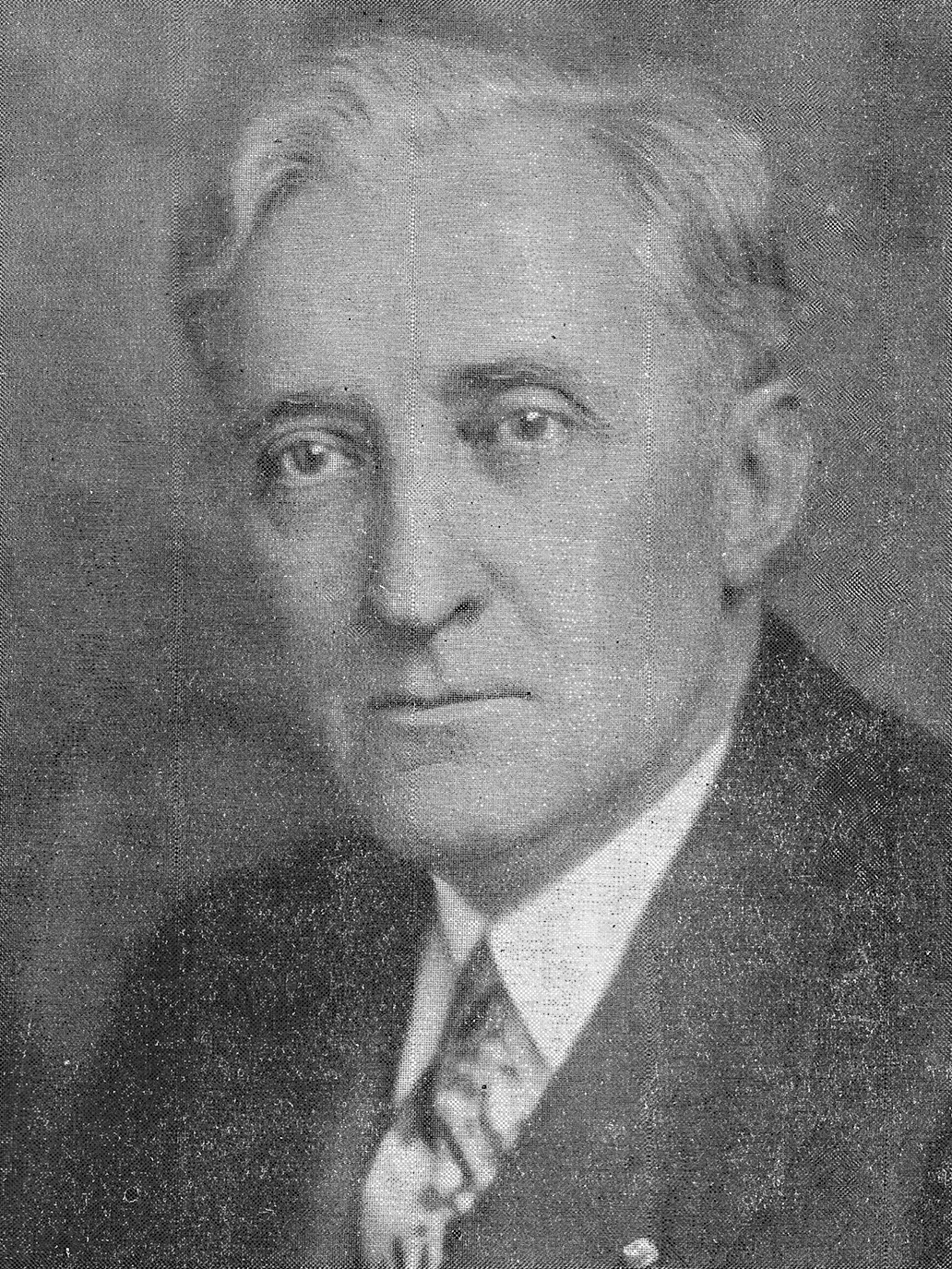
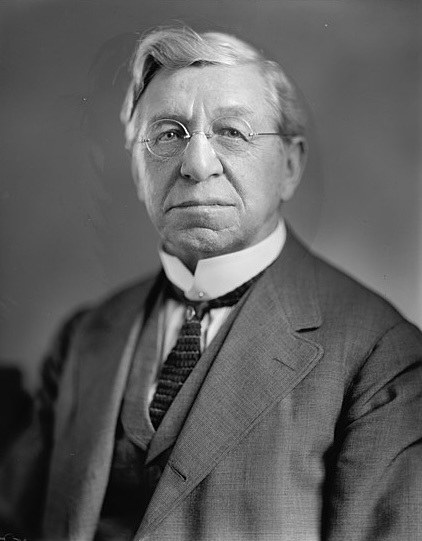
- Nominees of convention (Webb and Coxey)

Convention
- Date(s): April 28, 1932
- City: Omaha, Nebraska

Candidates
- Presidential nominee: Frank Elbridge Webb (Note: subsequently removed from ticket, with Coxey replacing him as presidential nominee) of California
- Vice-presidential nominee: Jacob S. Coxey Sr. (Note: elevated to presidential nominee after the removal of Webb from the ticket; Julius Reiter was made the new vice presidential nominee) of Ohio

The 1932 Farmer–Labor National Convention was held April 26–28, 1932 in Omaha, Nebraska. Frank Elbridge Webb was nominated for president, and Jacob S. Coxey Sr. was nominated for vice president. By 1932, the national Farmer–Labor Party had diminished into a weak rump. Very few delegates attended the convention, representing only nine states.

After the convention, the party would subsequently revoke its nomination of Webb, elevating Coxey to presidential nominee and adding Julius Reiter as its new vice presidential nominee.

== Logistics ==
The convention was held in Omaha, Nebraska, taking place April 26–28, 1932.

By 1932, the national Farmer–Labor Party had so declined that only 28 delegates were in attendance for the convention's opening session. Only nine states were represented by delegates at the convention.

== Nomination ==
The convention ultimately nominated Frank Webb of San Francisco, California for president; and Jacob S. Coxey Sr. (the former mayor of Massilion, Ohio) for vice president.

Coxey, John R. Brinkley, Thomas Mooney, and Arthur C. Townley had also been unsuccessfully proposed at the convention as possible presidential nominees.

=== Subsequent revocation of Webb's nomination ===
Subsequent to the convention, Webb was removed from the ticket by party executives, who alleged that he was "a tool of the Hoover administration". Coxey was elevated to the presidential nomination. Julius Reiter was added to the ticket as the new vice presidential nominee.

The Minnesota Farmer–Labor Party did not support the national party's ticket.

After the Farmer-Labor presidential nomination was taken from him, Webb formed the a party called the "Liberty Party" with himself as its presidential nominee (not to be confused with a larger party of the same name that gave its nomination to William Hope Harvey).
