= Jacob S. Coxey Sr. =

American politician (1854–1951)

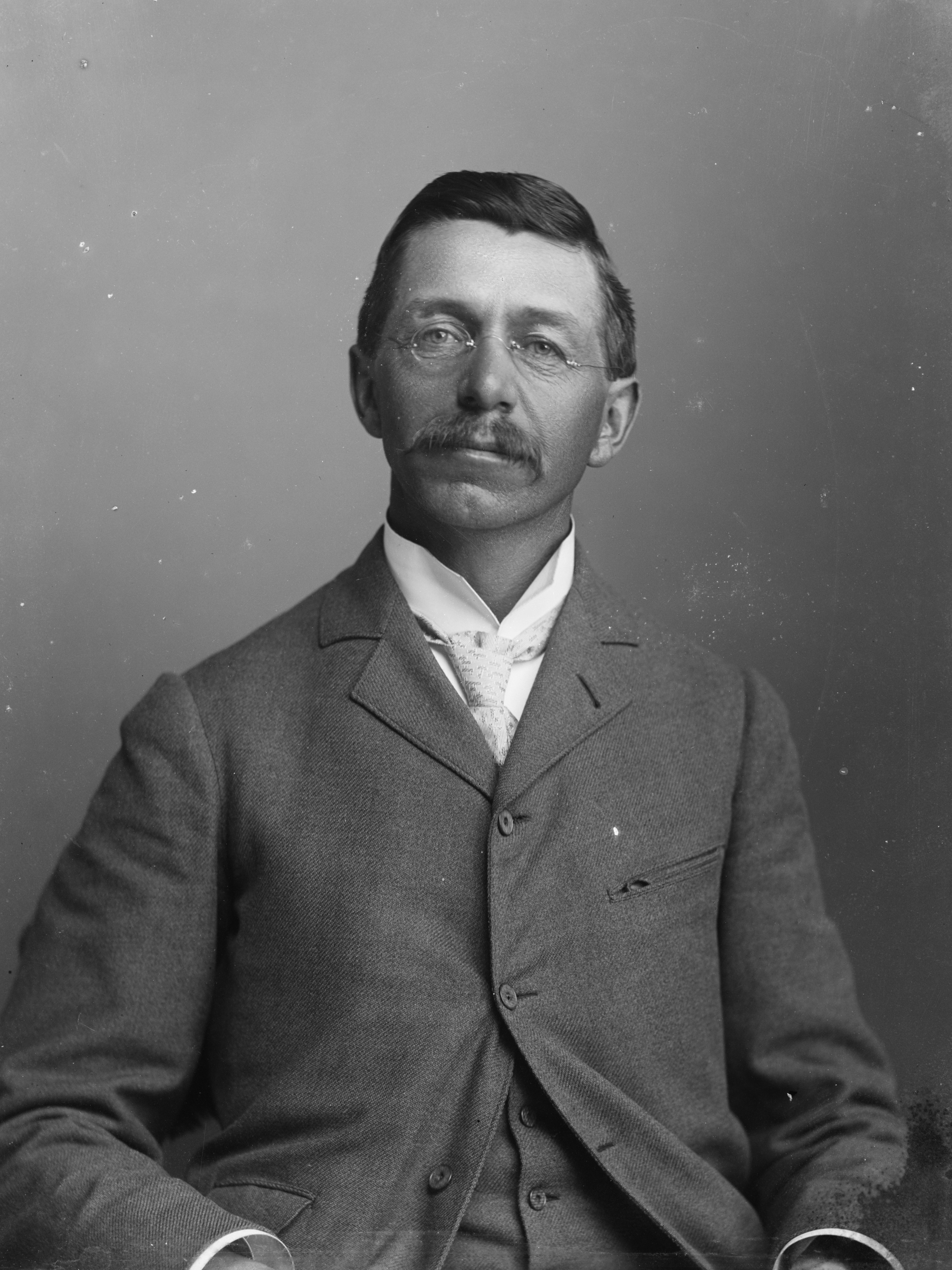
- Portrait by C. M. Bell c. 1894

Mayor of Massillon, Ohio
- In office January 1, 1931 – December 31, 1932

Personal details
- Born: Jacob Sechler Coxey; April 16, 1854 Selinsgrove, Pennsylvania, U.S.
- Died: May 18, 1951 (aged 97) Massillon, Ohio, U.S.
- Party: Greenback (1874–89); People's (1891–1908); Socialist (1910–1912); Independent (1908–26); Republican (1926–32); Farmer–Labor (1932–36); Union (1936); Democratic (1936–42)
- Spouse(s): Caroline Amerman (m. 1874; div. 1888) Henrietta Jones (m. 1891)
- Children: 6
- Profession: Businessman, landowner, political activist

Jacob Sechler Coxey Sr. (April 16, 1854 – May 18, 1951), sometimes known as General Coxey, was an American political activist. Twice, in 1894 and 1914, he led "Coxey's Army", a group of unemployed men who marched to Washington, D.C., to present a "Petition in Boots" demanding that the United States Congress allocate funds to create jobs for the unemployed. Although the marches failed, Coxey's Army was an early attempt to arouse political interest in an issue that grew in importance until the Social Security Act of 1935 encouraged the establishment of state unemployment insurance programs. He was also the Farmer–Labor Party's candidate in the 1932 presidential election.

== Biography ==
=== Early years ===
Jacob Sechler Coxey was born on April 16, 1854, in Selinsgrove, Pennsylvania, the son of the former Mary Ann Sechler and Thomas Coxey. His father worked in a sawmill at the time Jacob was born, but the family pulled up stakes to move to industrially thriving Danville, Pennsylvania, in 1860, with Jacob's father taking a job working in an iron mill.

Known as Jake, Coxey excelled in school, attending local public schools and at least one additional year in a private academy before leaving to take his first job at the age of 16 as a water boy in the mill where his father worked.

Coxey spent eight years at the iron mill, advancing through the ranks from water boy to machine oiler, boiler tender, and finally to stationary engineer. Coxey left the mill in 1878 to establish a business partnership with an uncle in a Harrisburg scrap-iron business. In this capacity, Coxey went on a scrap iron buying trip to the town of Massillon, located 325 miles to the west, in 1881. Coxey liked the town so much that he decided to stay, cashing out of the scrap iron business and using the proceeds to purchase a large farm and establish a quarry producing silica sand for the manufacture of glass and iron.

Coxey was a passionate equestrian, who bred blooded horses and raced or sold them across the nation. Horse racing was among the most popular spectator sports in the United States and Coxey's horse-breeding enterprise was prosperous, but he fell into gambling on racing, which contributed to the end of his first marriage in 1888, after 14 years and four children.

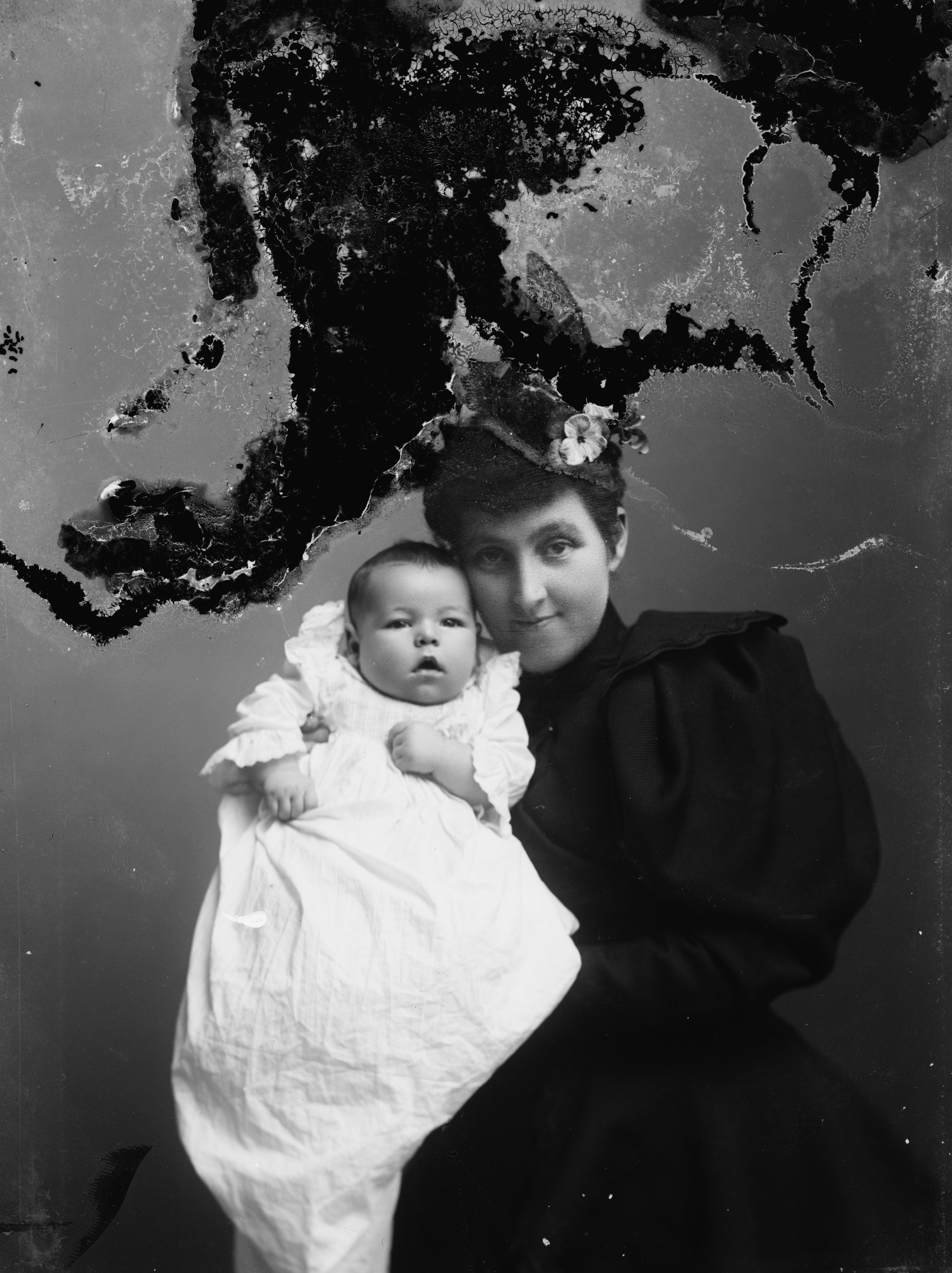
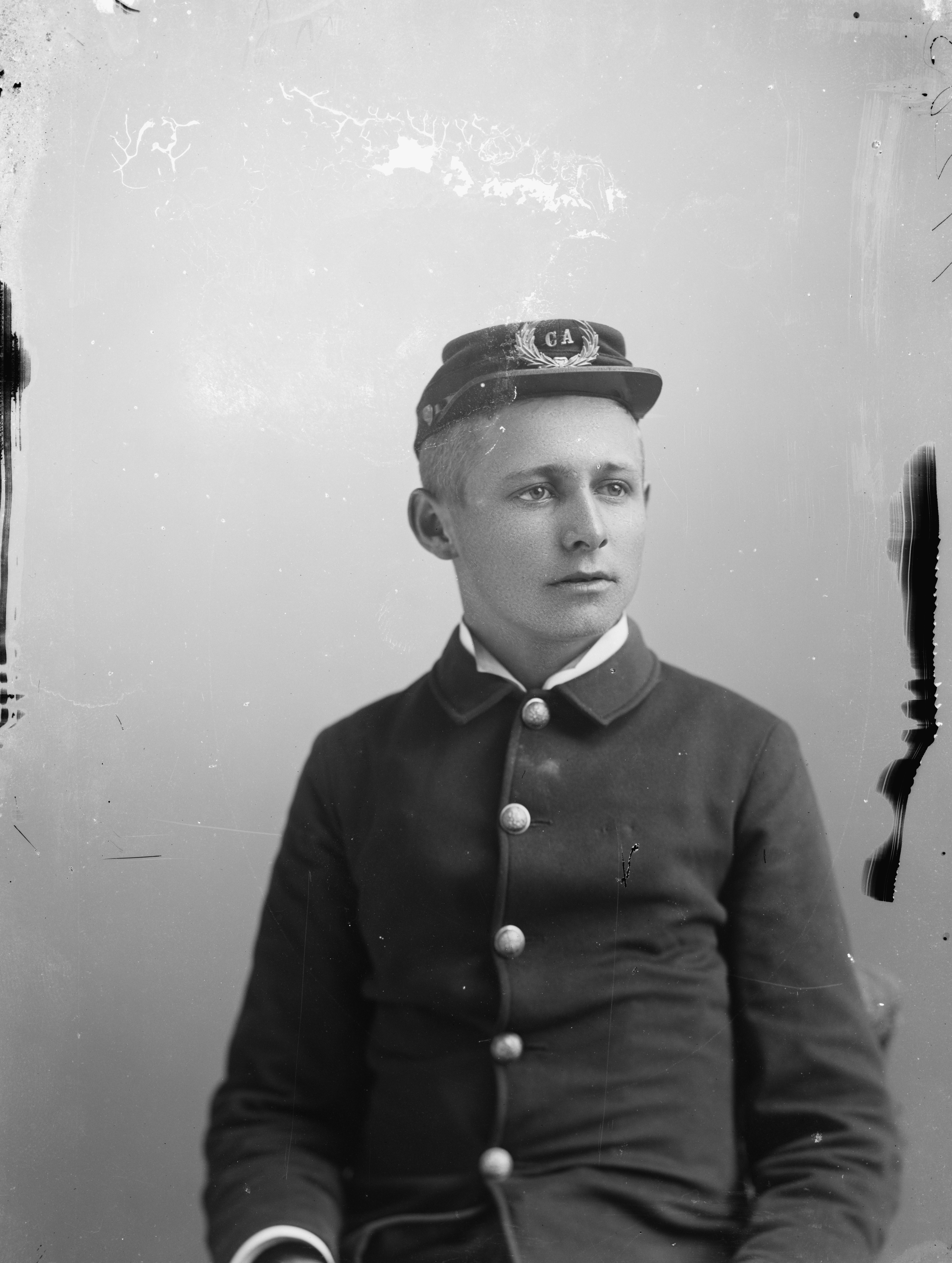
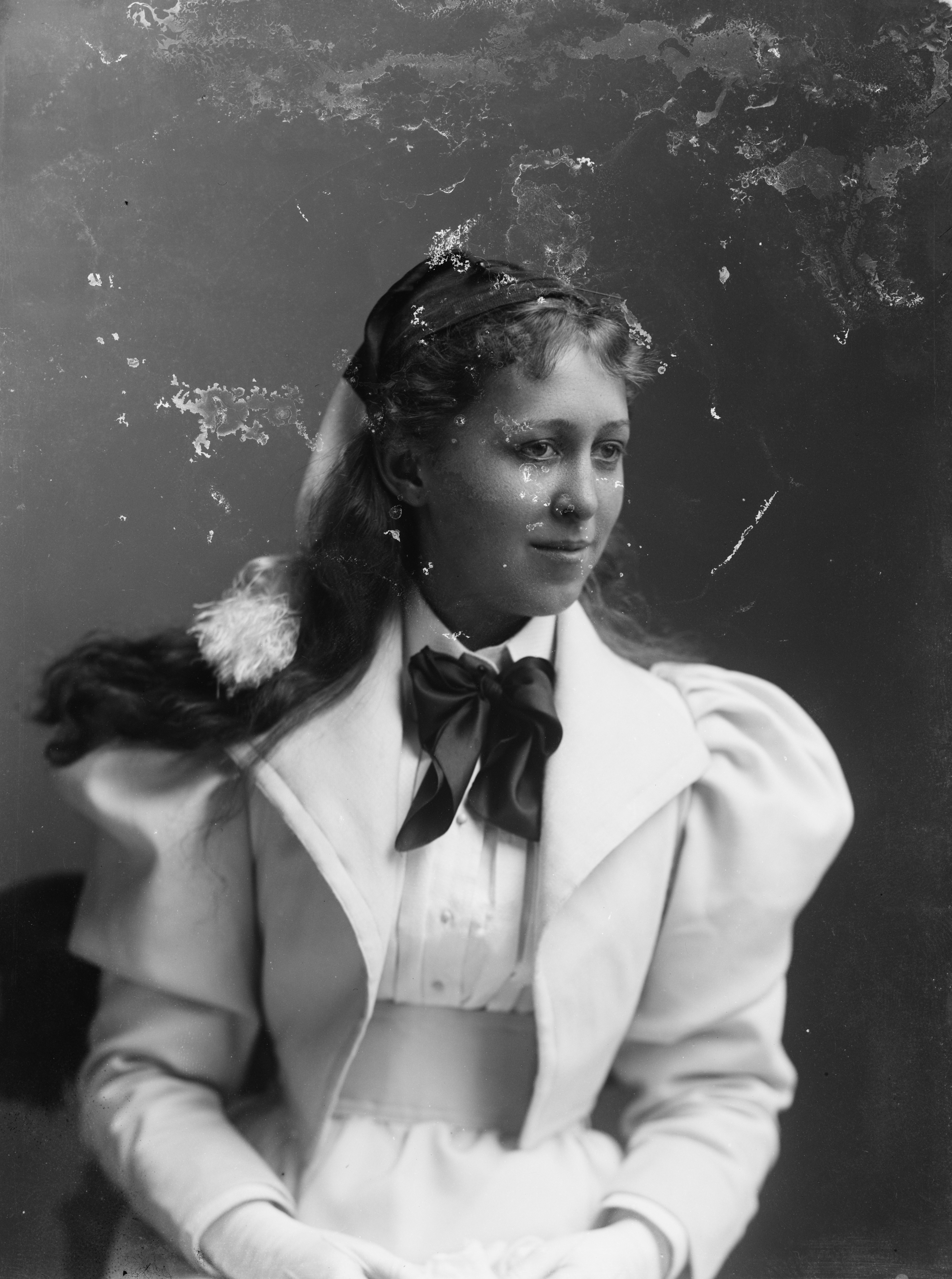
Portraits of Coxey's second wife Henrietta and youngest son "Legal Tender" (left), eldest son Jesse (center), and daughter Caroline (right) by C. M. Bell, 1894

Coxey would remarry in 1891, siring two more children, including a son named "Legal Tender" in honor of his father's quirky monetary obsessions.

=== First political interests ===
Coxey was born to parents who supported the Democratic Party and he entered politics under this banner. With the coming of the economic crisis of 1877, Coxey became a partisan of the United States Greenback Party, which ascribed the nations economic woes to faulty economic principles which led to a severe contraction of the money supply in the years after the American Civil War. Prosperity could be restored, Greenbackers believed, by the issuance of sufficient quantities of paper money.

When the People's Party emerged at the start of the 1890s, it earned the support of Coxey and most other Greenbackers and he shifted his allegiance to that political organization.

Coxey had experience as a laborer and an employer; he was also aware of the agricultural situation. He was a reformer who was willing to spend time and money to promote his plans for the betterment of the social order. Coxey was regarded by many contemporary observers as convincingly earnest. One reporter wrote, "He seems to be profoundly impressed with the suffering of mankind and with a belief that there is a deep-laid plan of monopolist to crush the poor to the earth."

He was often branded as a crank for challenging the economic system that made him so prosperous.

=== Coxey's Army ===
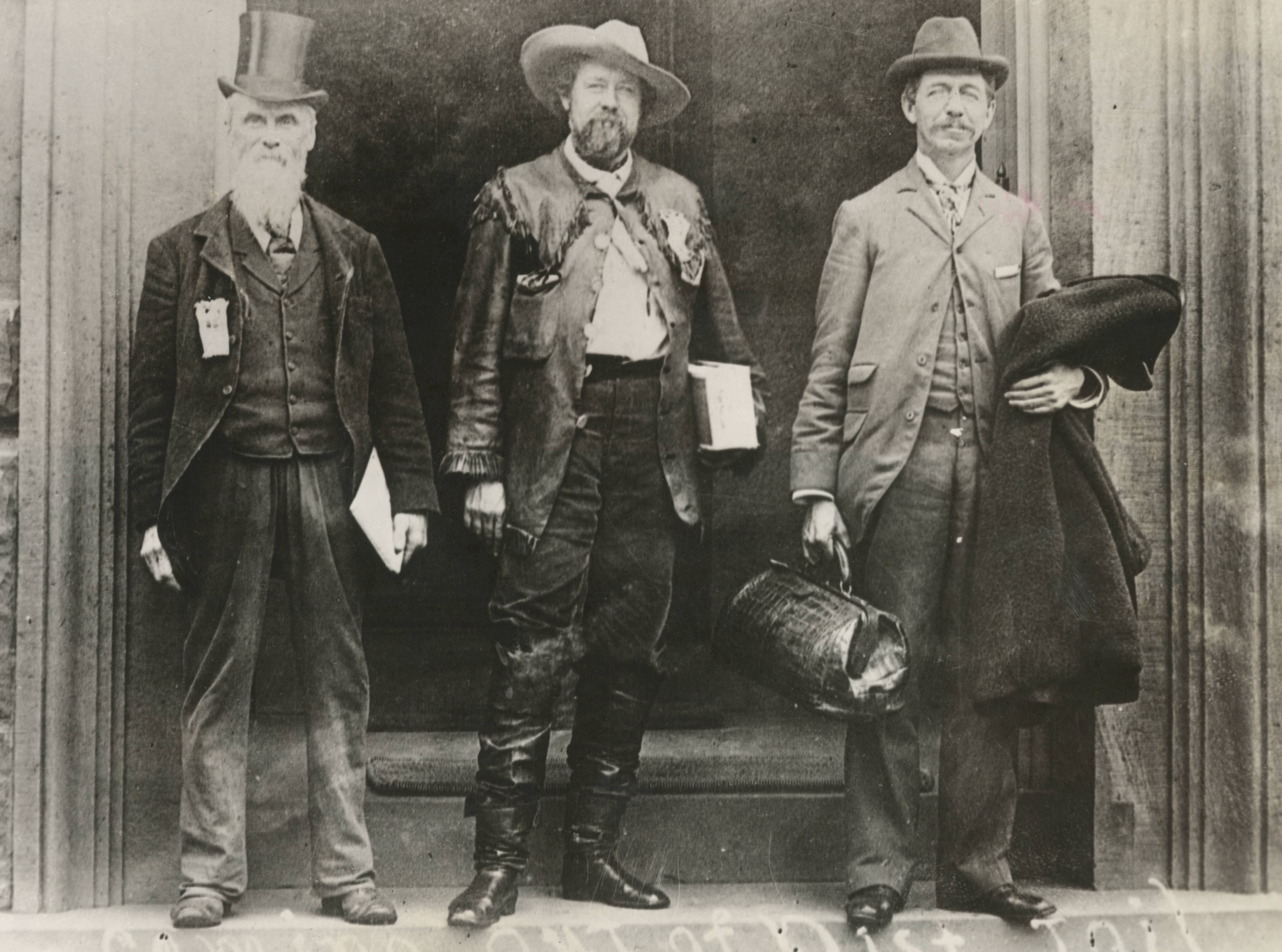
Coxey (right) is released from the D.C. Jail alongside associates Christopher Columbus Jones (left) and Carl Browne (center), 1894

In 1893, a severe economic depression swept the United States – a crisis remembered as the Panic of 1893. Unemployment skyrocketed, bank runs paralyzed the local financial system, and credit dried up, while a protracted period of deflation put negative pressure on wages, prompting widespread lockouts and strikes.

Never one to be short of either self-confidence or political ambition, Coxey believed that he had a cure for the nation's economic woes and began espousing a plan of public works, specifically road improvement, to be financed through the issuance of $500 million in paper money, backed by government bonds. This expenditure would in one swoop improve infrastructure, put unemployed workers to work, and loosen the strangled credit situation, Coxey believed.

To accompany his novel and controversial economic program, organized around the slogan "Good Roads", Coxey and his close political associate Carl Browne devised a novel political strategy designed to force the United States government into action. Rather than attempt to form a conventional political organization to capture decision-making offices, Coxey decided upon a course of what would later be known as direct action — the assembly of a mass of unemployed workers who would boldly march on Washington, D.C., to demand immediate satisfaction of their needs by Congress. This plan began to take shape early in the spring of 1894, to the point that by March the managing editor of the Chicago Record would assign young reporter Ray Stannard Baker to cover the "queer chap down there in Massillon" who was "getting up an army of the unemployed to march on Washington."

Many members of Coxey's family were opposed to his involvement in Coxey's Army. His father refused to talk to reporters and called his son "stiff necked", "cranky", and "pig-headed". One of Coxey's sisters called him an embarrassment.

Coxey later took up writing and purchased a gold mine in Fairview, Nevada. He joined the Socialist Party around 1912.

=== Presidential election of 1932 ===
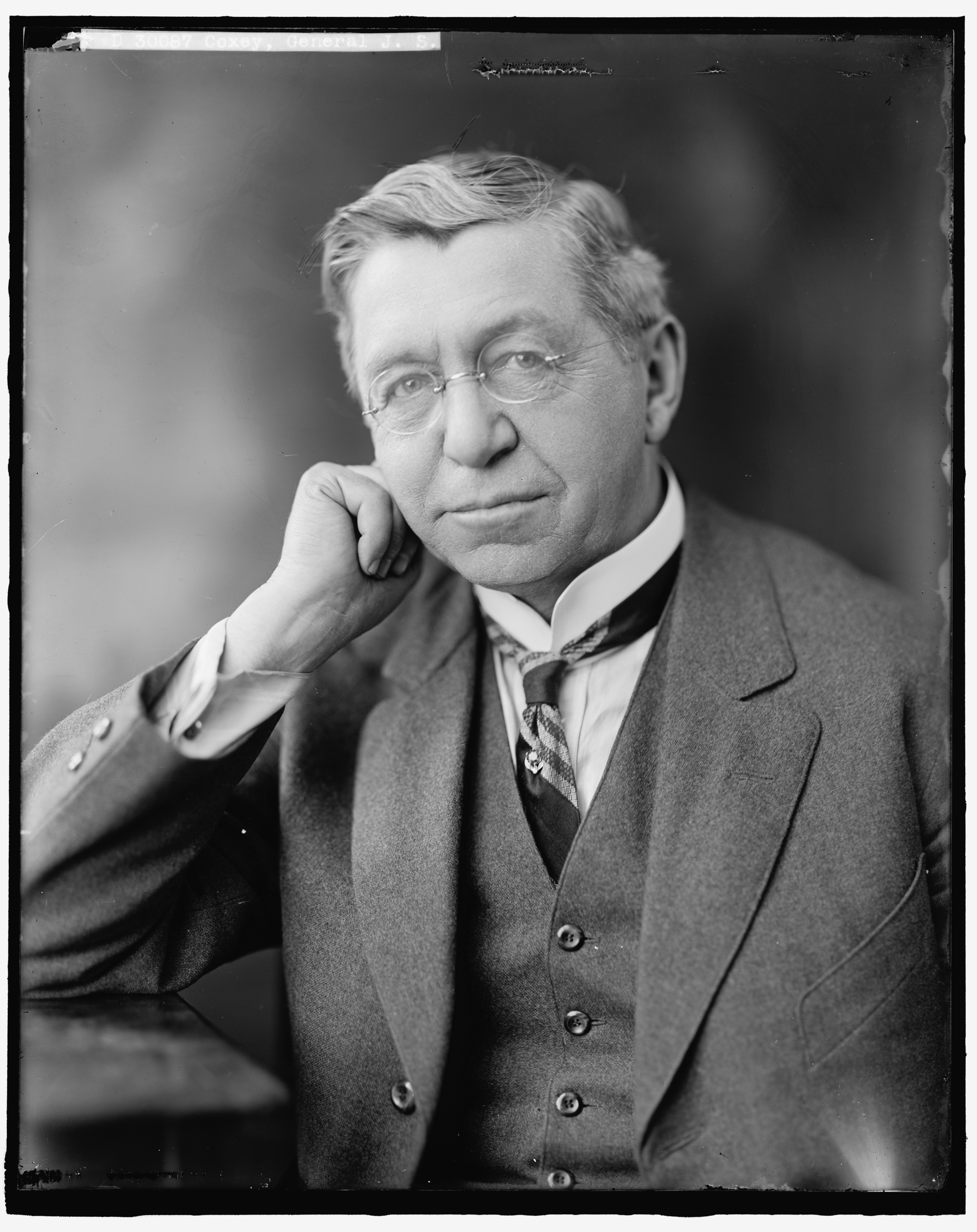
Portrait by Harris & Ewing c. 1914

In the 1932 presidential election, Coxey was considered for the Farmer–Labor Party's presidential nomination at its nominating convention; however, Frank Elbridge Webb was instead nominated, with Coxey receiving the party's vice-presidential nomination. Coxey later sought the nomination of the Kansas City-based contingent of the Liberty Party at its July convention, delivering a well-received speech. However, the party ultimately nominated Webb, who had been removed as the Farmer–Labor Party's nominee after the party alleged he was a spy for Herbert Hoover. Coxey declined to be the campaign's publicity manager and unsuccessfully implored them to make "the money situation" the party's only issue. Coxey was promoted to the Farmer–Labor Party's presidential nomination after they were unable to convince Huey Long to replace Webb. Coxey ran with Julius J. Reiter, the mayor of Rochester, Minnesota, replacing him as the party's vice-presidential nominee. Appearing on the ballot in 16 states, the ticket carried none and received 7,431 votes, most from Minnesota, where the state Farmer–Labor Party was dominant, though Coxey and Reiter did not have the support of the state party.

=== Death and legacy ===
Coxey died on May 18, 1951, aged 97, in Massillon, Ohio. When asked his secret to longevity, he told reporters an array of reasons from elixirs to not resisting temptation.

== See also ==
- Ohio's 21st congressional district#Election results
- Ohio's 18th congressional district#Election results
- Ohio's 16th congressional district#Election results
- John Maynard Keynes
