= Henry Quincy Alexander =

American politician (1863–1929)

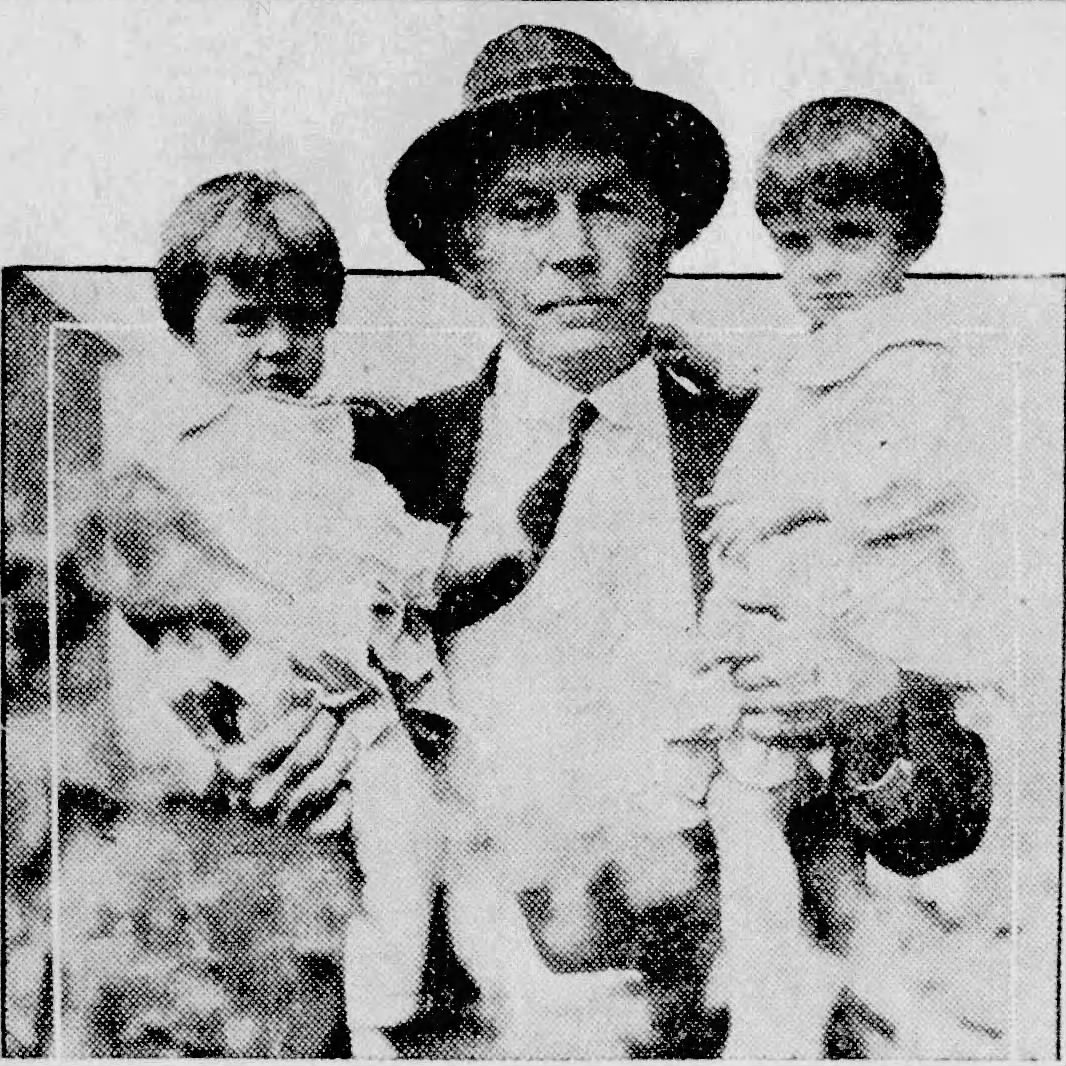
- Alexander holding his twin daughters in 1928

Member of the North Carolina House of Representatives
- In office 1903–1905 Serving with R. C. Freeman and Thomas O. Gluyas
- Constituency: Mecklenburg County, North Carolina

Personal details
- Born: Henry Quincy Alexander; August 22, 1863 Statesville, North Carolina
- Died: June 11, 1929 (aged 65) Providence, Mecklenburg County, North Carolina
- Party: Democratic
- Other political affiliations: Progressive (1924); National Greenback Party (c. 1920s); Farmer–Labor (1928)
- Spouses: Annie Campbell Alexander (m. 1888; died 1910); Ethel Brinkley Alexander (m. 1917)
- Children: 16
- Occupation: Physician; farmer; politician

Henry Quincy Alexander (August 22, 1863 – June 11, 1929) was an American physician, farmer, and politician who was president of the North Carolina Farmers' Union for 11 years. He also served in the North Carolina House of Representatives for two terms, was a member of the North Carolina Board of Agriculture for six years, was a presidential elector for the Progressive Party in 1924, and was briefly Frank Elbridge Webb's running mate on the Farmer–Labor ticket in 1928.

== Biography ==
=== Early life, education, and career ===
Henry Quincy Alexander was born on August 22, 1863, in Statesville, North Carolina. He received his primary and secondary education at public schools located in Iredell County, North Carolina. He then attended the University of Maryland Medical School. In 1903, Alexander founded the Mecklenburg County Medical Society and served as its first president. He worked as a physician around Providence and Matthews. Alexander was a member of the Farmers' Alliance for several years.

=== North Carolina House of Representatives ===
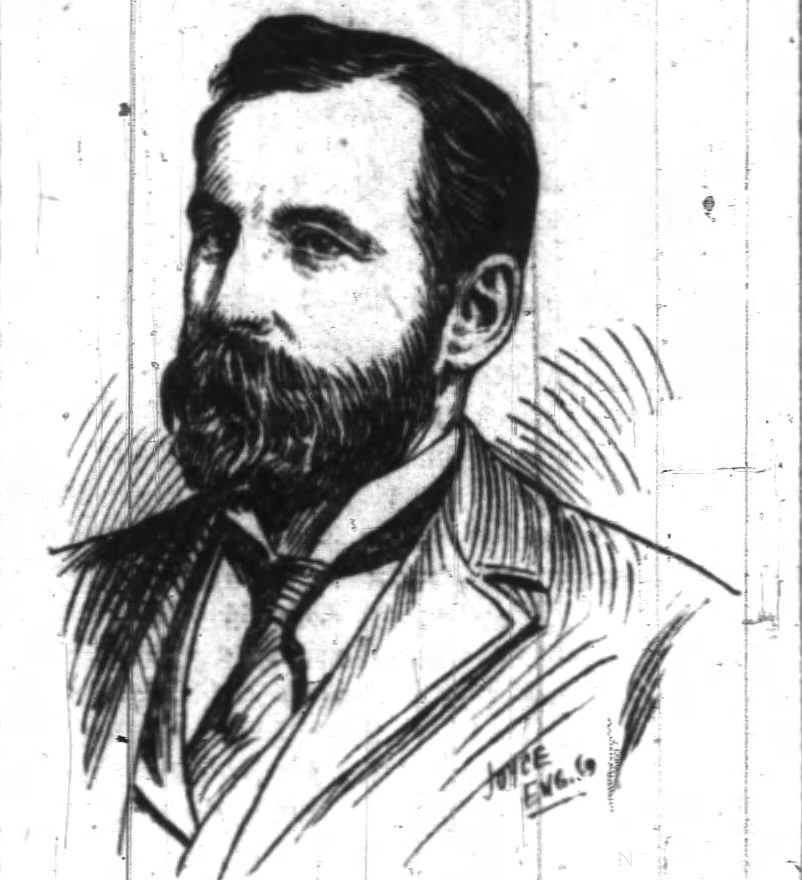
1903 drawing of Alexander

In 1902, Alexander was elected as one of the three representatives representing Mecklenburg County in the North Carolina House of Representatives. He won the most votes in the Democratic primary, avoiding a runoff, securing his place on the ballot, and effectively guaranteeing his victory in the general election. He won reelection to a second term in 1904. In the legislature, Alexander introduced a successful bill that reduced the poll tax and he was also an active supporter of temperance. In 1906, while recovering from typhoid fever, Alexander decided to not seek reelection to the legislature.

In his first term, Alexander belonged to the House Committee on Counties, Cities, Towns and Townships, House Committee on Health, House Committee on Insane Asylums, House Committee on Institutions for the Blind, House Committee on Institutions for the Deaf and Dumb, House Committee on Propositions and Grievances, and the House Committee on Private Bills.

In his second term, Alexander chaired the House Committee on Counties, Cities, Towns and Townships and belonged to the House Committee on Health, House Committee on Institutions for the Blind, House Committee on Institutions for the Deaf and Dumb, and House Committee on Propositions and Grievances.

=== North Carolina Farmers' Union ===
In 1908, the Farmers' Union—drawing significant inspiration from the defunct Farmers' Alliance and, to a lesser extent, the Grange—organized a state affiliate in North Carolina. Alexander was elected as the inaugural president of the state affiliate. The union advocated for farmers by supporting measures to improve the education of farmers as well as the state education system more broadly, engaging in limited business ventures, and through cooperative efforts.

Buoyed by superb leadership and adverse farming conditions, the state union became incredibly successful—more than the Grange or Farmers' Alliance had been in their time—even though the national union was comparatively smaller. From 1910 to 1914, the state union had the largest dues-paying membership of any state in the national union, and in 1913 it paid 37.1% of the national dues. In 1912, it had 33,358 due paying members, which didn't include inactive members and women.

Alexander and the union supported progressive education measures, such as night schools, compulsory attendance, library expansion, free textbooks, and a six-month school schedule. Their support was instrumental in the adoption of such measures. Alexander stated "[t]his work of education is the most important mission of the Farmers' union." However, later years saw Alexander and the union fight efforts to implement an eight-month school schedule.

The organization reached its zenith in 1912. In 1913, union membership began a persistent decline, attributed to an increase in cotton prices and the executive committee's decision to stop paying organizers. Reflecting on this, Alexander said that the organization had grown rapidly and then "[t]he pendulum swung the other way" and that "[m]embership decreased with good prices for farm products."

Alexander served on North Carolina's Board of Agriculture for six years.

Alexander opposed the Preparedness Movement and American entry into World War I. After the war, he supported disarmament and stood by his opposition. His anti-war stance was widely criticized across the state and led to the departure of many union members, including some senior officials. His leadership still retained the support of a majority of union members, and the union took steps to demonstrate their support for the war effort after America's entry. In 1919, an unsuccessful effort was made to remove Alexander from the North Carolina Board of Agriculture due to his opposition to the war. The effort would've entailed the abolition of the board, and then the creation of a State Board of Agriculture whose sole difference was Alexander not being a member.

Alexander refused many calls to seek political office, as union bylaws forbid any member from seeking political office, with him saying "I had rather be president of the Farmers' Union than Governor of the State, for I believe there is more opportunity to do good in the office which I have been honored with."

In 1919, Alexander declined reelection as president and was promptly elected to the executive committee, where he served for six years. (Note: Possibly for eight years or until his death, sources differ.)

=== 1924 United States presidential election ===
In 1924, Alexander endorsed Robert M. La Follette's presidential candidacy under the Progressive Party. Despite this, he did not bolt from the Democratic Party. Alexander led a unified organization of agrarian and labor forces in North Carolina to advocate for La Follette. He served as one of La Follette's presidential electors in North Carolina. Alexander attempted to hold joint campaign events with some Republican and Democratic electors, admitting that it was an attempt to sway their voters to the Progressive banner. This did not end up occurring, as the Democrats, who had carried the state in every election since 1876, declined to participate. North Carolina was La Follette's second-worst state in the election, with him only receiving 1.38% of the vote.

=== 1928 United States presidential election ===
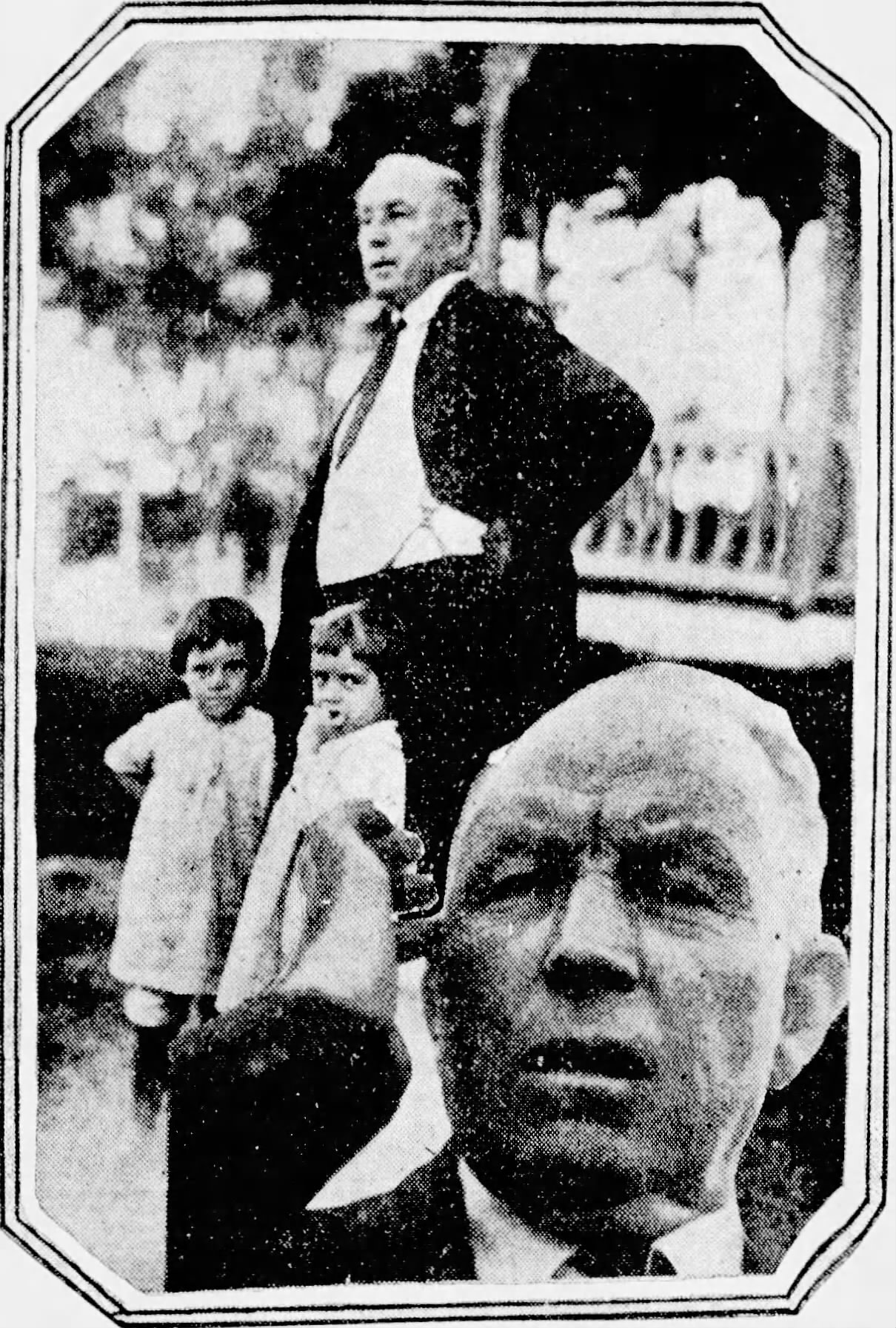
In a collage published in The Charlotte Observer after his nomination, Alexander is standing with his twin daughters in front of his home, with a cut-out of his face in the bottom right.

In the 1928 Democratic Party presidential primaries, Alexander supported Senator James A. Reed. He resigned himself to supporting Al Smith after Smith secured the party's nomination, judging him a lesser evil than Republican nominee Herbert Hoover and more likely than Hoover to serve humanity and not corporate wealth.

On September 6, 1928, Colonel Frank Elbridge Webb and Senator Reed were nominated by the Farmer–Labor Party to serve as their presidential and vice presidential nominees, respectively. Reed refused the nomination, remarking "Who the hell is Webb?" and making clear his support for Smith. On September 11, the Farmer–Labor Party Executive Committee contacted Alexander via telegram to ask if he would accept the vice presidential nomination if he was nominated. He answered in the affirmative, and soon after he accepted their nomination for vice president. Alexander was shocked to be nominated, as he had never been affiliated with the Farmer–Labor Party or any party members. He accepted the nomination for four reasons: in a spirit of protest of the major party platforms; to serve those fighting to improve the conditions of farmers and laborers; out of appreciation for the offer itself; and because he believed Senator Reed had refused it in a rude manner. He accepted with the understanding that he would be replaced if a stronger candidate could be found and after informing the executive committee that he could not actively campaign due to poor health. Despite accepting the nomination, he still intended to vote for Al Smith. (Note: It is unclear if the Farmer–Labor Party not being present on the North Carolina ballot was relevant to this decision.) Alexander noted particular opposition to the McNary–Haugen Farm Relief Bill and the Volstead Act in interviews after accepting the nomination, though he held back on offering more of his views until he had read the party platform. On September 18, Alexander resigned from the ticket with a telegram saying "Nominate another man and withdraw my name. Platform not satisfactory." He thought the party platform, though superior to both the Democratic and Republican platforms, had two flaws: it was silent on the banking sector, which he was known to have a fanatical opposition to, and had a plank he interpreted as seeking to discredit the Catholic Church, and through that the Catholic Al Smith. Although Alexander found Webb supremely qualified for the presidency—and even more progressive than the party itself—he could not square Webb's silence on the banking issue, which he viewed as the most important issue of the times. He also felt that his poor health might have encumbered the party, as it prevented him from campaigning. After his withdrawal, Webb ran alongside L. R. Tillman, a member of the party's executive committee, and received 6,390 votes.

After withdrawing as the Farmer–Labor Party's vice-presidential nominee, Alexander became an active Smith supporter, co-leading the La Follette musketeers, an organization intended to get former La Follette voters to back Smith. Smith was defeated in North Carolina, the first Democrat to lose it since 1872.

== Personal life and death ==
In 1888, Alexander married Annie Lee Campbell, who was from York, South Carolina. They had eleven children together, eight of whom were living when she died in 1910. In 1917, he married Ethel Brinkley (1888–1959), who was from Elm City, North Carolina, and an alum of Greensboro Female College. They had five children together. While serving in the North Carolina House of Representatives, Alexander told reporters to mention how proud he was of his children. Upon receiving the Farmer–Labor Party's vice presidential nomination, he spoke of how he was prouder of his five-year-old twin daughters than the nomination.

Alexander died on June 11, 1929, at his home in Providence, Mecklenburg County, North Carolina. He was 65 years old.
