= Frank Elbridge Webb =

American engineer and presidential candidate (1869–1949)

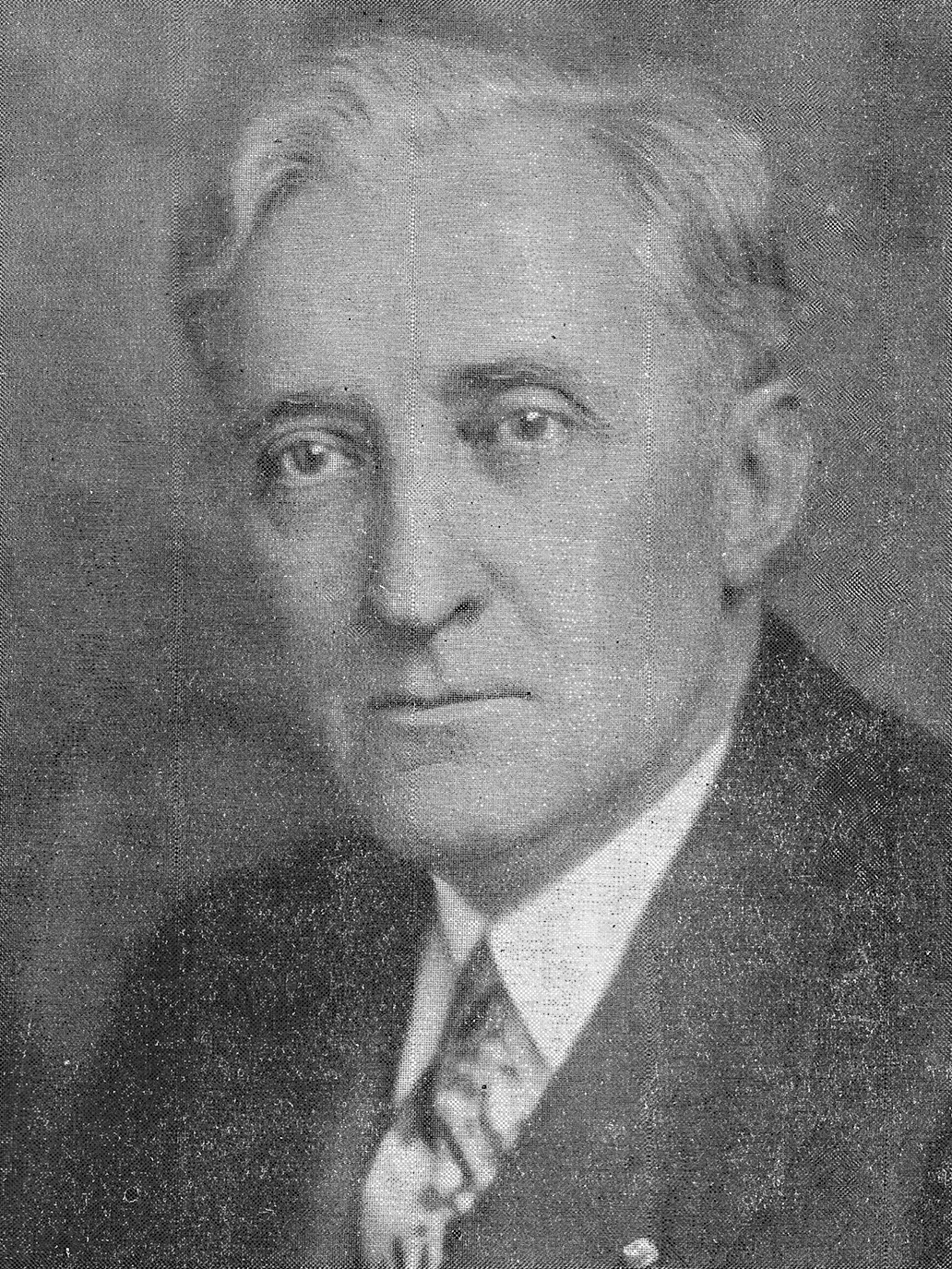
- Webb in 1931

Personal details
- Born: September 1, 1869 Angels Camp, California, U.S.
- Died: June 15, 1949 (aged 79) Washington, D.C., U.S.
- Party: Republican (until 1928); Farmer–Labor (1928–1932); Liberty (1932)
- Other political affiliations: Constitutional (c. 1930s)
- Spouses: Agnes Hayes (div. 1908); Alice Gilman (m. 1909); Ethel L. Webb (div. 1927); Elsa White Webb (née Reid) (m. 1928)

Military service
- Branch/service: California National Guard; United States Army
- Rank: Colonel
- Battles/wars: Pullman Strike; Spanish–American War; World War I

Frank Elbridge Webb (September 1, 1869 – June 15, 1949) was an American engineer who served as the Farmer–Labor Party's candidate in the 1928 presidential election. In the 1932 presidential election, he was initially renominated by the Farmer–Labor Party before being removed and running as the nominee for a wing of the Liberty Party. (Note: The wing that nominated Webb was sometimes reported to be known as the Liberty and Unity Party, Liberty Unity Party, or just the Unity Party.) He also led many unsuccessful efforts to build bridges that spanned the San Francisco Bay.

Born in the California Gold Country, Webb farmed in his youth. He served in the California National Guard and became associated with John H. Dickinson, a general, attorney, and state senator. In 1901, he moved to New York and became involved in engineering work. He also served in the U.S. Army during the Spanish–American War and World War I. In 1922, Webb proposed a plan to build a bridge across the San Francisco Bay. While the plan initially drew wide support, it ultimately failed. He also drew attention for his roles in an attempted purchase of the Idle Hour estate and a scheme to control Mexican government investments in the United States.

A lifelong member of the Republican Party, albeit one who showed little interest in politics, Webb bolted from the party in 1928 and received the Farmer–Labor Party's presidential nomination. Among the policies he campaigned for were a referendum on prohibition, relief for farmers, and public ownership of utilities. His running mate was L. R. Tillman, who accepted the nomination after some tumult which included Senator James A. Reed asking "Who in hell is Webb", a phrase that became identified with the campaign. Webb appeared on the ballot in four states and received 6,390 votes.

Webb remained active in politics and made a second bid for the presidency in 1932, the first presidential election after the Great Depression began. He was initially renominated by the Farmer–Labor Party, but the party removed him after concluding that he was a spy for President Herbert Hoover. After being removed, Webb won the nomination of a wing of the Liberty Party dissatisfied with party founder Coin Harvey. The party had poor fundraising and Webb failed to appear on any ballot.

== Life ==
=== Family and youth ===
Frank Elbridge Webb was born on September 1, 1869, in Angels Camp, part of the California Gold Country, to Annie Settle and Elbridge Webb. His father was a wealthy mining engineer from New England and owned the Utica mine in Angels Camp. His mother had been born in Oregon and was a singer. Webb had an older sister who was an elocutionist, Adelaide E. Webb (1867–1896). After Webb's father died his mother remarried; Webb had six half-siblings as a result. Webb was descended from the Pilgrims who arrived on the Mayflower and his great-grandfather Nathaniel Webb had served in the Revolutionary War. Later in life, Webb would join the Sons of the American Revolution, which had been founded by his cousin William Seward Webb, and The Kansas City Star would observe that it was hard to overlook Webb's Mayflower heritage because of how frequently he mentioned it.

Webb's father died in his mine when Webb was very young. After his death, Webb began farming and through that and other work he was able to afford an education. He graduated from a San Francisco night school in 1886 and received a diploma as a graduate engineer. Webb also worked as an elevator boy and then second assistant salesman at a dry goods store in San Francisco.

=== Career and military service ===
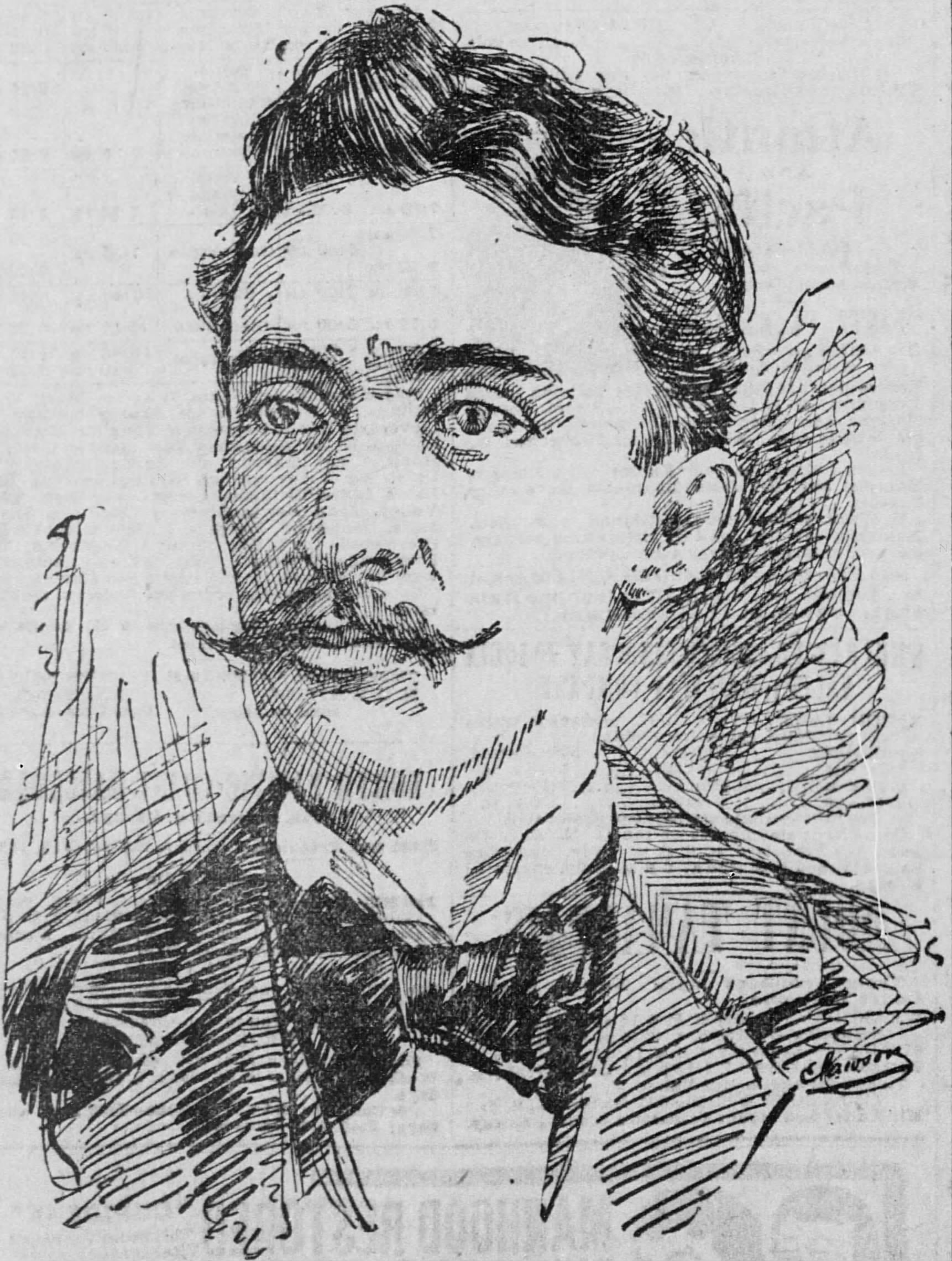
1897 drawing of Webb

In 1884, Webb joined the California National Guard, where he rose to the rank of captain serving as an aide-de-camp to General John H. Dickinson. He served with distinction on Dickinson's staff when the National Guard was called to put down ARU strikers at Sacramento during the Pullman Strike. He also studied law under Dickinson and worked as his law clerk, working on the defense of murderer Theodore Durrant and as a crucial witness in a case regarding James G. Fair's estate. As a graduate engineer, Webb created an irrigation system on a large California ranch, rescuing it from financial ruin. He also managed and sold many California estates. In 1901, Webb moved to New York, where he worked with John A. Bensel on the New York State Canal System and the Catskill Aqueduct. As of 1906, Webb lived in Melrose, Massachusetts, and was vice-president of a large Boston supplies company. After Bensel died in 1921, Webb became the head of Bensel's eponymous engineering firm.

In 1898, Webb thought that Congress was being too slow in declaring war on Spain and declared that when it did declare war he would be honorably discharged from the National Guard, join the U.S. Army, and muster a company of cowboys. During the Spanish–American War, Webb served as a recruiting sergeant. During World War I, Webb was an intelligence officer for Major General Leonard Wood and served in the army quartermaster, with him serving in the Philippines. After serving from 1914 to 1920, Webb retired with the rank of colonel.

=== Involvement in politics ===
Webb was a member of Republican Party and attended the Alameda County Republican convention in 1896. In 1897, Webb sought to become the Appraiser of Customs for the Port of San Francisco. The Alameda Times-Star thought he was a viable candidate, saying he had been active politically for multiple years and was well-known and popular. They observed that he had ties with many influential East Coast men. His cousin William Seward Webb was a Vanderbilt-by-marriage and Webb was good friends with George Morse, nephew-in-law to President William McKinley. Webb was supported by Dickinson, a state senator, and he was also endorsed by the San Francisco County Republican Committee, the Alameda County Republican Committee, and many leading local politicians. The Daily Encinal newspaper attributed his viable candidacy and wide support to Dickinson's backing. John T. Dare was instead appointed appraiser, with Webb being considered for the assistant appraisership. In the 1899 U.S. Senate election, Republicans in the California legislature were unable to coalesce behind a single candidate. Webb urged the party to elect somebody, not expressing any preference and saying that he believed his opinion was widely popular among young Republicans and the party in general, with Webb expressing fear that they would fail to elect anyone and deprive California and the Republican Party of a senator. This occurred, though Thomas R. Bard would be elected in a special session in 1900. After the 1906 San Francisco earthquake killed thousands and leveled most of the city, Webb was in correspondence with California Governor George Pardee. The Boston Globe published excerpts of a letter Pardee wrote to Webb, refuting rumors that the national guard had killed survivors.

=== Idle Hour syndicate ===
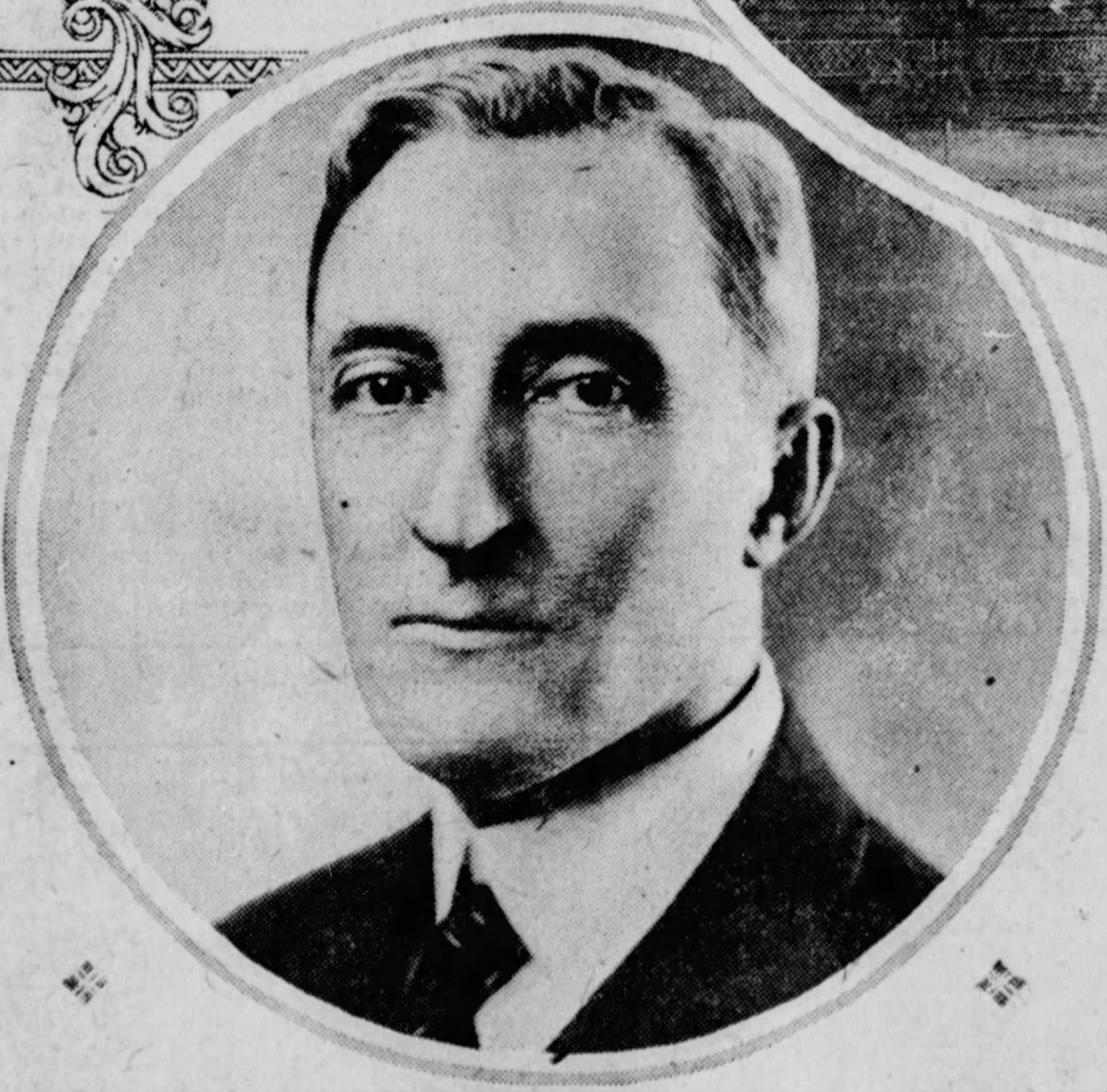
Webb c. 1922

In December 1921, Webb arranged a deal and headed a syndicate that agreed to purchase the Idle Hour estate from Harold Vanderbilt and convert it into a country club. Webb was related to the Vanderbilt family and would later say that he had managed Harold Vanderbilt's property for a time. A person close to Harold Vanderbilt said that the syndicate was mostly made up of Western oilmen who were Vanderbilt University alumni and that they planned to make the country club exclusive to alumni. The New York Herald reported that the syndicate consisted of "men prominent in oil, railroad, financial, industrial, professional, artistic and social circles." Webb would not then say who the other members of the syndicate were, except that they were wealthy young men. Webb said the country club would be the "finest and most exclusive country club in existence." Webb said that Harold Vanderbilt would be a member of the country club and did not specify any other members, with the syndicate also arranging $5,000,000 ($90.3 million in 2025) for the club's development. Webb did not entertain speculation about the price of the deal, but he did say they paid fair market value, then estimated at around $4,000,000 ($72.2 million in 2025). In December 1923, Harold Vanderbilt would sue the syndicate, saying that they had agreed to purchase it for $440,000 but that they had only paid $50,000 and fallen behind on payments, requesting the deal be annulled. He would rebuy it in foreclosure proceedings for $556,000. Webb would summarize the situation: "[I] handled the sale of [Harold Vanderbilt's] Long Island estate, Idle Hour, to Isaac M. Putnam, a wealthy oil man. (Note: Putnam had been earlier identified as the president of the syndicate.) This deal fell through, however, and Vanderbilt took back the property."

=== Mackay lawsuit ===
In 1926, Webb sued Colonel Robert Mackay, who had served in the British Army, for $8,000 ($153,877 in 2025) which he had loaned him in 1922. Webb loaned the money to Mackay, a recent acquaintance, because he knew him to be "the wealthiest bachelor in Scotland". During the trial, it was revealed that Mackay had introduced Webb to Richard H. Cole, a friend of President Warren G. Harding's who had expected to be appointed to a diplomatic post in Mexico. Through that post, Cole believed he could control Mexican investments into the United States and receive valuable concessions, and Webb agreed to raise a $100,000 ($1.92 million in 2025) fund to lobby Mexican and American officials to secure this reality. On January 21, 1922, Webb and Cole hosted a 75-person dinner which cost $3,000 ($57,704 in 2025) that was attended by many prominent figures, including former Speaker of the House Joe Cannon, Senator Henry Cabot Lodge, another 35 members of the United States Senate, and some prominent Mexican officials. President Harding had been expected to attend, but Webb warned him against attending, saying he was "being used". The scheme's failure was variably attributed to Mexican political instability which damaged Cole's influence, Harding's absence from the dinner, and the fact that the dinner's extravagance attracted press coverage, leading to a government inquiry, scaring off Webb's investors. Webb was awarded $6,000 ($115,408 in 2025) by the judge when the trial ended, with the judge finding that Mackay had previously returned $2,000 to Webb.

== San Francisco Bay bridge projects ==
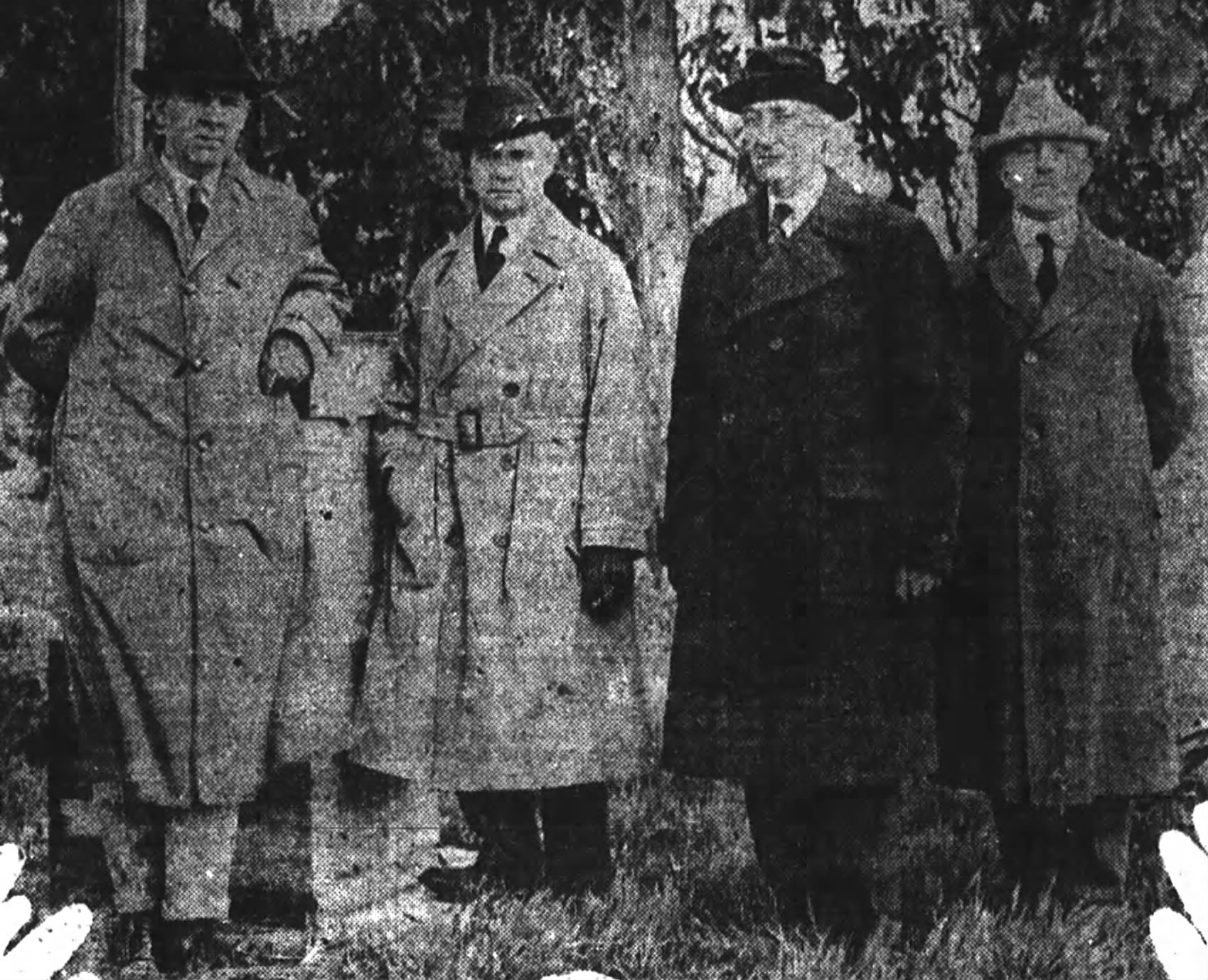
The leaders of a surveying expedition to explore the viability of Webb's proposed bridge at Little Coyote Point in 1923. From left to right, Frank Sinnicks, W. H. Bissell, Webb, and John J. McGrath.

In 1922, Webb orchestrated an effort to develop Little Coyote Point, San Mateo, California. Later that year, he outlined a plan to build a toll bridge that spanned the San Francisco Bay, from Coyote Point to the coast of Alameda County. This plan received wide support from prominent bay residents, who had long supported a transbay bridge and saw Webb's plan as viable. In 1923, the San Mateo County Board of Supervisors granted Webb a franchise to build the bridge and it received the approval of the War Department. In 1925, the board transferred the franchise to Frank C. Towns after Webb struggled to secure capital and was forced to delay the beginning of construction. After losing the franchise, Webb continued with other transbay bridge efforts, though they attracted little local support and were repeatedly rejected by the authorities. These efforts included seeking a franchise to build a transbay bridge at the nearby Candlestick Point. The Candlestick bridge attracted opposition in San Mateo and San Francisco, where there were fears that it would lead the War Department to not grant permission for a bridge from San Francisco to Oakland.

In March 1930, Republican U.S. House representative from Pennsylvania Harry C. Ransley introduced a bill to give Webb a license to build a bridge from San Francisco and San Mateo that crossed into Alameda. The bill advanced out of committee with a favorable recommendation. San Francisco U.S. House representative Richard J. Welch called it a "joke" and committee chair James S. Parker returned the bill to committee after its opponents informed him that they would challenge its presence on the floor on the basis that the committee had lacked a quorum. Action on the bill was indefinitely postponed. Webb later opposed a proposed bridge plan on the basis that it endangered national defense.

== Presidential election of 1928 ==
=== Nomination ===
Previous presidential nominees of the Farmer–Labor Party

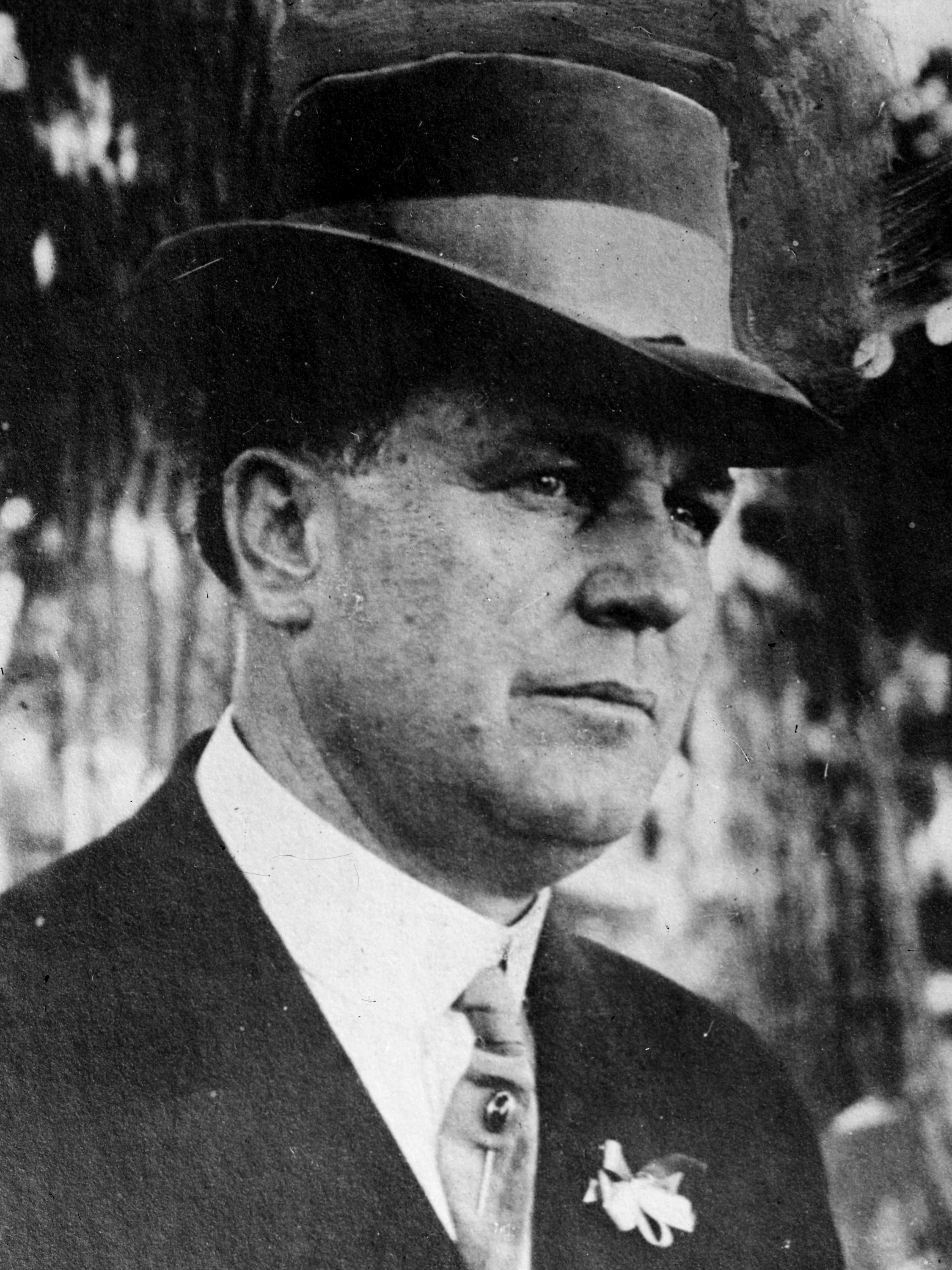
Parley P. Christensen

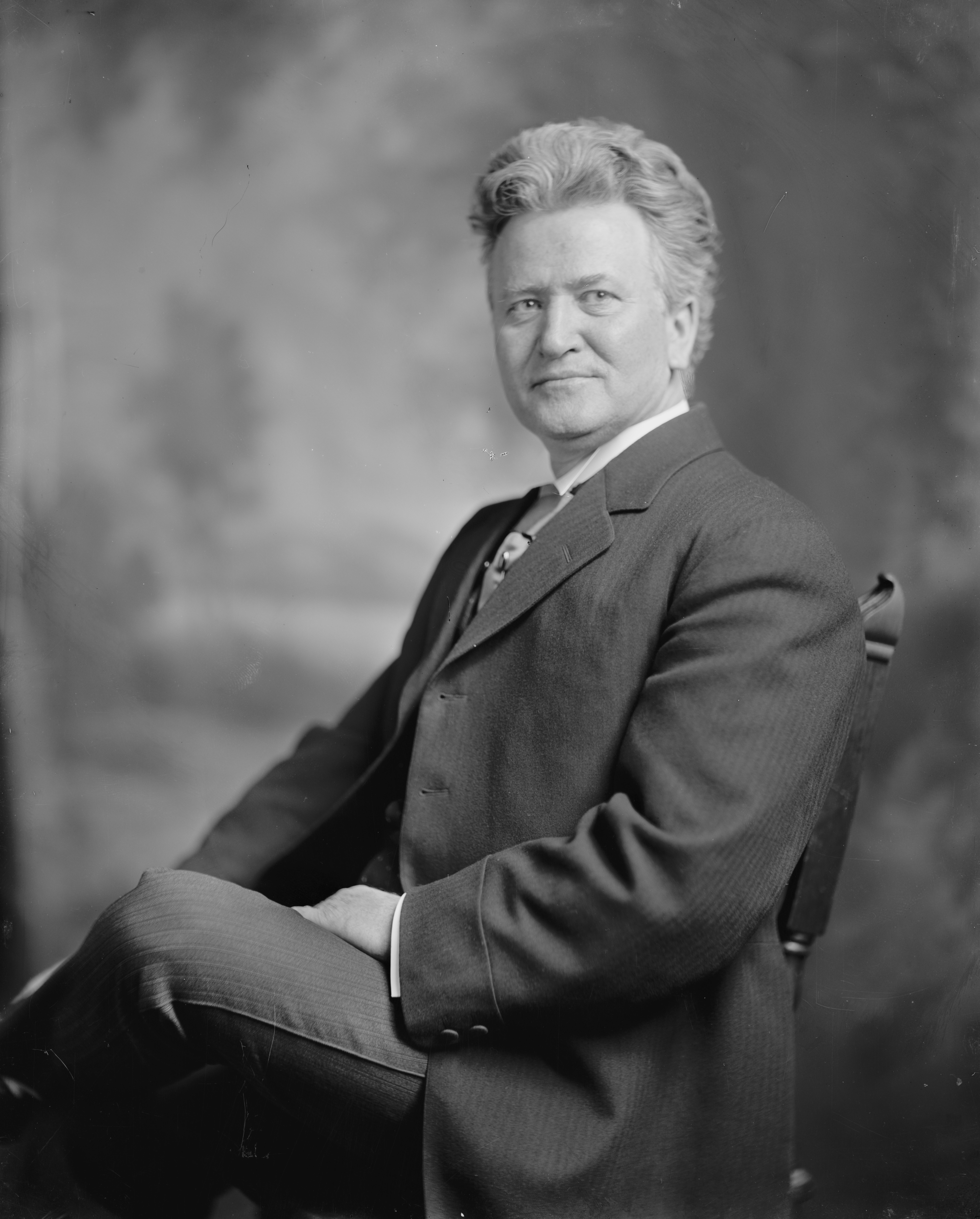
Robert M. La Follette

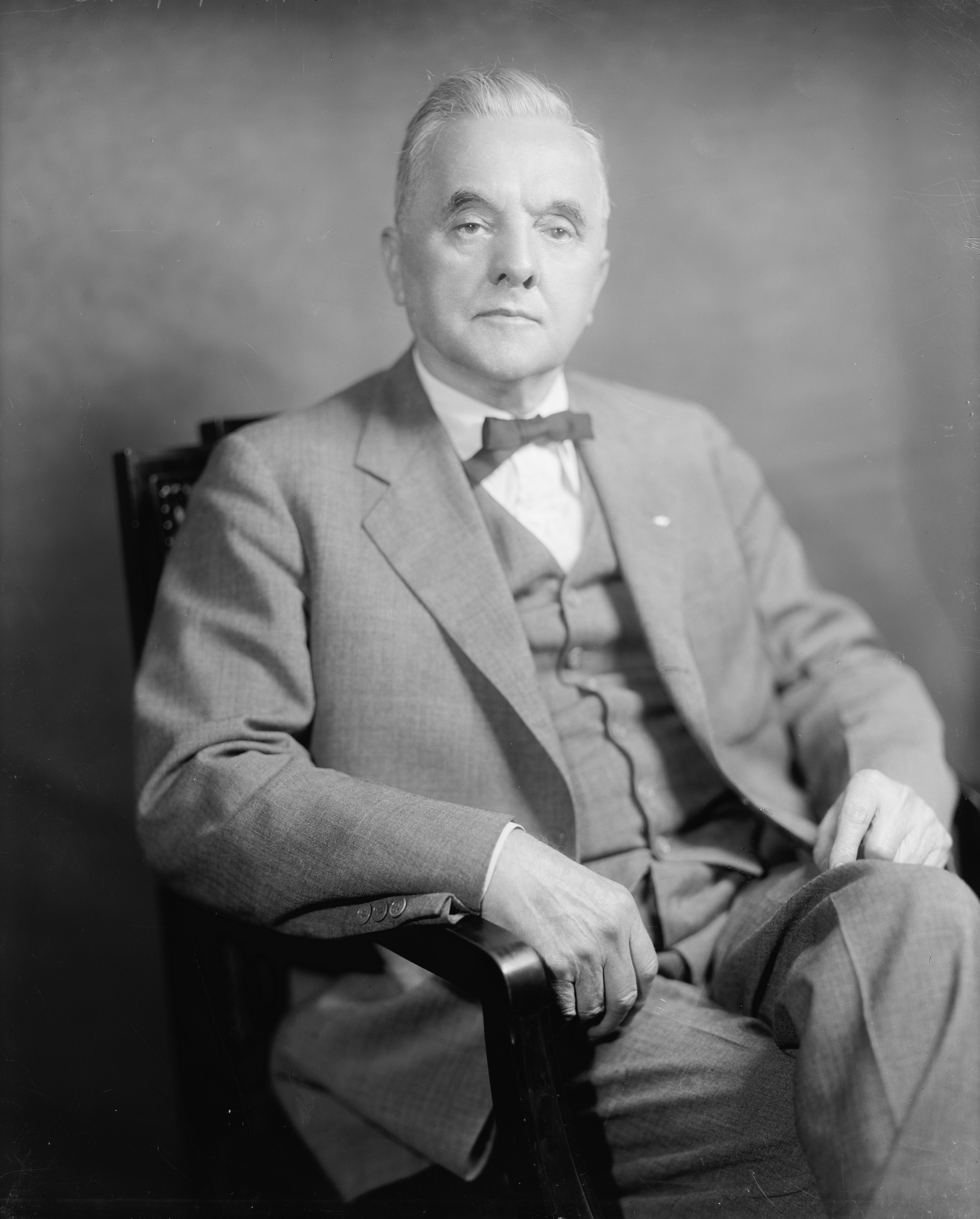
George W. Norris

In the 1928 presidential election, Webb bolted from the Republican Party and received the Farmer–Labor Party's (FLP) nomination. The FLP had been founded in the aftermath of World War I. In the 1920 presidential election, it had nominated Parley P. Christensen, who received 1% of the popular vote and appeared on 19 state ballots, receiving a fifth of the vote in Washington and South Dakota. However, by the time Webb was nominated the party had been in a period of persistent decline, beginning soon after the 1920 election. This had been greatly accelerated when members of the Workers Party (later renamed Communist Party USA) won control of the organization in 1923. The party was quickly condemned by many of its allies in the Conference for Progressive Political Action (CPPA), and by the time its old non-communist leadership had reconstituted it without them, many of its strongest members had defected to the communist organization or abandoned partisan politics. The FLP joined with the CPPA, Socialist Party, American Federation of Labor, and other left-leaning groups in supporting Senator Robert M. La Follette in the 1924 presidential election. Appearing on the ballot in 47 states, sometimes on the FLP's ballot line, La Follette received 17% of the vote and won Wisconsin. After his defeat, many of the FLP's allies withdrew from politics, taxed or disenchanted by the campaign, and those who remained, such as the FLP itself, were left weakened. Meeting at its July 1928 national convention in Chicago, the FLP narrowly decided to nominate Senator George W. Norris over Socialist nominee Norman Thomas, by a vote of 16 to 14. Norris, while incredibly sympathetic to the FLP's cause, rejected due to the inevitable defeat he felt such an effort would end in. Chester Rowell, a prominent progressive Republican, described the party which nominated Webb as having effectively ceased to exist prior to his nomination, writing "There was a time when this Farmer–Labor party threatened to be a real movement to organize the Western form of social discontent. That time has passed."

In the months prior to his nomination, Webb had been wary of bolting from the Republican Party and running for president, fearing it would make him a laughingstock among his business associates, but he eventually declared that "[c]onditions compel me to change my usual political affiliations." According to Webb, he had been approached by an individual whose identity he would not disclose in early July about seeking the nomination. Webb made himself known to the FLP by attending a conference of their leaders in Denver, where he declared that he would accept their nomination if the platform was revised. The executive committee assembled in Kansas City, Missouri, on September 5, less than a week after the convention had been called. The seven-member executive committee only had five in attendance, joined by 12 advisory delegates, with the five executive committee members present deciding they constituted a quorum of the committee. Two members of the executive committee stormed out of the convention prior to Webb's nomination. The three remaining members of the executive committee met together, and shortly before midday on September 6 they nominated Webb, a nomination he accepted.

=== Platform ===
Webb campaigned on farm relief, public ownership of utilities, no changes in immigration law, a nonpartisan cabinet, and a national referendum on prohibition, among other positions.

Webb's acceptance of the nomination was conditioned on the party platform being revised. Writing on the process of revising the platform, executive committee member J. Edwin Spurr commented that while Webb had approved of most of the party's platform, the executive committee and Webb had "discovered... several faulty clauses", and so the executive committee revised it. The Minneapolis Journal described the revised platform as "practically repeat[ing]" the original platform. Prior to being revised, the platform had called for Philippine independence, Puerto Rican autonomy, an end to the military occupation of the U.S. Virgin Islands, the establishment of trade relations with the Soviet Union specifically, the abolition of private banking, and public ownership of all natural resources and the means of production. After being revised, the party platform did not include any of the aforementioned planks. (Note: The revised platform called for "establishment of equitable trade relationships with all governments, permitting autonomy to all.") On prohibition, the party had initially declared itself to be in favor by a simple plank which called for the "enforcement of all laws", causing consternation among some members who wanted stricter more specific language. The revised platform was explicit in declaring the FLP to favor of a strict enforcement of the Eighteenth Amendment and Volstead Act, the destruction of all illegal manufacturers of alcohol, the prevention of all transportation of alcohol, and the consumption of alcohol. The revised platform also featured a single plank emphasizing the party's support for separation of church and state and calling for all Americans who swore loyalty to a foreign power or institution in conflict with the Constitution to be stripped of their citizenship and deported.

=== Search for running mate ===
At its July convention, the FLP had nominated Will Vereen to serve as the running mate to Norris. Like Norris, Vereen rejected the nomination, though he was not as sympathetic as Norris, calling it an "absurdity". As such, when the executive committee met to name Webb they also had to find him a running mate. The committee was set on naming Senator J. Thomas Heflin, until Webb made it clear he would decline the nomination if Heflin was his running mate, as he believed Heflin had attended cheap burlesque shows in Washington, D.C. The Minneapolis Journal applauded Webb's rejection of Heflin, though it did find his reason for refusing Heflin, a leading conservative and white supremacist long alleged to belong to the Ku Klux Klan, surprising. The executive committee next offered the vice presidential nomination to Senator James A. Reed of Missouri, who had fielded a strong bid for the Democratic presidential nomination in 1928. Reed's associates deeply resented that he had been offered it, finding it humiliating and feeling as if he had been used. Upon being informed of the nomination, Reed angrily declared "Who in hell is Webb? (Note: Also reported as "Who the hell is Webb?") The Farmer–Labor Party? I never heard of it!" Reed declined the nomination, saying "I am positively astounded, I never dreamed of such action", with him repeatedly reiterating his support for Democratic nominee Al Smith. The executive committee resumed its search for a running mate, with L. R. Tillman, a member of the executive committee, being held in reserve in case no more prominent individual could be found who was willing to serve.

After Reed's refusal, the executive committee contacted Henry Quincy Alexander, with him accepting the party's vice presidential nomination on September 11. Alexander had no prior affiliation with the FLP or any of its leaders, with his first contact being the executive committee asking if he would accept their vice presidential nomination if offered. Alexander was a prominent leader of North Carolina's agrarians and had rallied them to La Follette's side in 1924. A member of the Democratic Party, in the 1928 Democratic presidential primaries he had been a supporter of Senator Reed. Alexander said his acceptance was due to his appreciation at being offered the nomination, his desire to serve the nation's farmers and laborers however he could, and because of Reed's refusal, with him writing:

This nomination had previously been tendered to a man of great ability and Nation-wide reputation who, if press reports are correct, had declined it with scorn and derision. To decline the honor was all right; but the manner in which it was done, if correctly reported, was all wrong. No man is larger or more important to the welfare of this Nation than its workers; the men who create our wealth, yet are possessed of so little of it.

In press interviews, Alexander noted his opposition to the McNary–Haugen Farm Relief Bill and the Volstead Act, but otherwise refrained from commenting on his ideology until he had the opportunity to read its platform. On September 18, after reading the party platform, Alexander told the FLP to withdraw his name because he opposed the platform. Alexander took issue with the platform for two reasons; the platform did not call for the abolition of private banking, which Alexander was fanatical about, and it included a plank he saw as trying to discredit the Catholic Church, and through that the Catholic Al Smith. Webb attempted to prevent Alexander's withdrawal by sending a statement to him, and while Alexander evaluated Webb as well-qualified to be president and even more progressive than the party platform, he could not understand Webb's silence on the abolition of private banking. Tillman would be Webb's running mate.

=== Campaign ===
In the San Francisco Peninsula, where Webb lived and was well known for his bridge project, his nomination sparked either amazement or amusement in acquaintances. Webb had seldom involved himself in politics besides being close friends with many Republican politicians, in fact he had never previously sought elected office. (Note: The appraisership he sought in 1897 was filled via appointment.) Chester Rowell commented that San Franciscans did not know Webb as a farmer or laborer, with the San Francisco Chronicle describing him as "one of the 'most mysterious' men in the Bay district". His selection also prompted legal trouble; an ex-wife sued for $500 a month of alimony, using his presidential bid as evidence that he could pay, and a butcher sued for $80.40 after hearing of his nomination prompted them to look through their records, where they allegedly discovered that Webb had not paid for some meat. The meat suit was filed in the court of John J. McGrath, San Mateo County's Justice of the Peace; McGrath pledged to bring the case to court as quickly as possible, challenging Webb to begin his farm relief program by repaying the butcher. McGrath had been very close with Webb as they worked together to secure a bay bridge, but eventually a disagreement became personal and they split, with McGrath opposing bridge projects that Webb was involved in. McGrath pledged to make a month-long campaign in Iowa, Kansas, and Nebraska to nullify the "pernicious influence" that the "newest Moses of the downtrodden agrarians of the grain belt" might have on its "toilers and yeomen". McGrath did not imagine that Webb unencumbered would receive any large number of votes, but in the unlikely event he did, McGrath predicted "calamity", and so he set out to dissuade people from voting for Webb by showing the "shallowness of the Webb pretentions as the standard bearer of the Farmer–Labor Party".

Webb was the only third party candidate to state that there was the slightest possibility he would be elected president. His professed route to victory involved winning the Northwest while Smith and Hoover battled for the rest of the country, neither of them able to secure a majority of the Electoral College. The election would then be thrown to the House of Representatives, where Webb predicted that he could be selected. Party members, such as Spurr and Frank Lowson, Webb's campaign manager, also predicted that in the event the party deadlocked the electoral college, placed above one of the major parties in the Electoral College, and the House was unable to organize a majority behind any one candidate, then the FLP would still claim the presidency, as the third place party would join with the FLP in the contingent election in the Senate and select the FLP's vice presidential candidate, elevating them to the presidency should the House deadlock fail to break by Inauguration Day. In a letter thanking supporters after the election, Webb described his defeat as inevitable. The ticket did not have the support of the Minnesota FLP.

Reed's derisive remark was embraced by the party, with Webb and the FLP including the remark in campaign literature, such as pamphlets and party bulletins.

=== Results ===
Webb appeared on the ballot in Colorado, Iowa, Oklahoma, and South Dakota. He received 6,390 votes. (Note: He received 1,092 votes in Colorado, 3,088 votes in Iowa, 1,283 votes in Oklahoma, and 927 votes in South Dakota.)

== Presidential election of 1932 ==
=== Activity after defeat ===
After ceasing his bridge projects, Webb did not spend much time in California, living in Washington, D.C., while still saying he legally resided in San Francisco. In January 1929, he called for Congress to not pass farm relief in its lame-duck session, while Coolidge was still in office, and urged a special session to be called after Hoover was inaugurated, so Hoover could have a stronger role in it. Webb also attended Coolidge's final Congressional reception at the White House, where Hoover and Smith were absent. Webb attended the dedication of Bowles Agawam Airport in Massachusetts, alongside a Congressional delegation and as a guest of Governor Frank G. Allen. In the 1930 midterm elections, Webb endorsed Minnesota FLP candidates, including Floyd B. Olson's successful candidacy in the gubernatorial election and Ernest Lundeen's candidacy in the U.S. Senate election. Lawson gave a radio address expressing Webb's support.

=== Reed convention ===
In late November and early December 1931, a convention of third parties met in Omaha, Nebraska. The convention was called by Liberty Party member Alli Reed, a monetary activist who had marched with Coxey's Army, and who sought to unify various third parties, including the FLP, into a single third party called the Farmer–Labor Party. Webb delivered a speech attacking Hoover and the gold standard ahead of the convention, and Liberty Party vice-presidential nominee Andrae B. Nordskog also addressed the convention. The Kansas City Star theorized that Webb's support for bimetallism may have resulted from his father's mining career. The convention had low attendance and failed amid charges from Reed that the FLP was more interested in absorbing the other parties than joining with them, and that FLP member Roy M. Harrop had sabotaged the convention. The convention's ending was protested by Webb, Lawson, and Roland Bruner, a one-time chairman of the Liberty Party who joined the FLP at the convention. (Note: Bruner had been appointed to the Liberty Party's executive committee at its August 1931 convention. Soon after the convention, many members of the executive committee became estranged from Coin Harvey, the party's nominee for president, with him demanding, and receiving, the resignations of many committeemen, including Bruner, who had ascended to become the national chairman of the committee. Bruner was presenting himself as president of the "Defenders of Right and Liberty", a group housed at a church he had purchased to serve as the Liberty Party's headquarters amid the conflict with Harvey.) A small FLP group held a convention in Omaha after the unity convention ended, electing Minnesota FLP co-founder and Rochester, Minnesota, mayor Julius Reiter as the party's chairman, electing Harrop as the party's vice-chairman, and scheduling an FLP national convention. (Note: The convention was originally scheduled to begin on March 2, 1932. Its beginning was delayed to April 26, 1932.) Webb said that he did not have an interest in the presidential nomination, but would run if needed, and his candidacy for the nomination was considered strong.

=== FLP convention ===
In a February 1932 interview with the Omaha World Herald, Webb declared his candidacy for the FLP's nomination. In a March interview with the San Francisco Chronicle, Webb named U.S. Republican Representative Louis T. McFadden as his likely running-mate. Webb was ambivalent on whether he had the slightest chance of being elected, but said that the FLP would win many seats in Congress. The FLP national convention opened on April 26 in Omaha. Webb was the only declared candidate for the presidential nomination, with Jacob S. Coxey Sr., the leader of Coxey's Army, also seen as a leading candidate. Reiter was unable to attend and so the convention was chaired by Harrop. The convention opened with representatives from five states and Washington, D.C., and each group had equal representation in selecting the presidential nominee. Webb was the sole member of the convention to stay in Omaha's most-luxurious hotel and his wealthy attire sharply contrasted with most other members of the FLP. His nomination met significant opposition due to his wealth. Webb sought recognition as California's representative at the convention, but Harrop thrice ruled that Webb had not presented proof he lived there. After a prolonged deadlock which seemed likely to end in Coxey's nomination, Lawson was able to get the convention's credentials committee to accredit Webb. Webb cast California's vote for himself, thus giving himself enough votes to win the nomination.

Webb rarely talked with other attendees, and most of his attempts to speak were shutdown by Harrop. The party platform omitted many of the radical ideas advocated for by Coxey, which Webb had rejected. Coxey was given the party's vice-presidential nomination. In June 1932, Webb was erased from the ticket after refusing to endorse the party platform in whole, and after it was charged that he lived in Washington, D.C., and not San Francisco. (Note: At the National Farmer–Labor Convention, had Webb not been allowed to cast California's votes for himself as its delegate, he would have lacked the necessary support to become the nominee. The convention had initially deadlocked because he was not allowed to cast California's votes, but shortly before the convention was set to end he was allowed to vote for California, giving him enough support to become the party's nominee.) The party reached the conclusion that he was "a spy for Hoover".

=== Liberty Party ===
A quiet, immaculate man, Colonel Webb bears little resemblance to the insurgents of an earlier day. He speaks directly, but there is little of the fire and color of the older politicians.

— The Kansas City Star, December 6, 1931

==== Campaign history ====
In July 1932, Bruner called a unity convention in Kansas City, Missouri, to fuse together the "old Liberty, the Farmer–Labor, the Progressive and the Socialist parties and the Monetary League and the Farmers' Union" in order to solidify the opposition to the Democrats and Republicans. After considering the nominations of Smith W. Brookhart, Norman Thomas, Coin Harvey, and Jacob S. Coxey, among others, the convention nominated Webb for president and Nordskog for vice president. The nomination of Webb and Nordskog was ridiculed as they were both Californians, and therefore constitutionally ineligible of being awarded California's electoral votes. In September 1932, Reverend Otis L. Spurgeon, a Baptist minister and the national secretary of Bruner's Liberty Party, replaced Nordskog as the vice presidential nominee. The Socialist and Farmer–Labor parties, and most other organizations claimed to fuse at the convention, disavowed any claims of fusion. The old Liberty Party called the convention illegitimate and said that Bruner was falsely representing himself as the chairman of its executive committee. In April 1932, the old Liberty Party had merged with the Jobless Party, planning to nominate a single candidate for president at an August convention of the "Jobless-Liberty" Party. The merger collapsed shortly after the convention began, with the Liberty Party delegates present at the convention renominating Coin Harvey for president. (Note: The Jobless Party delegates present at the convention nominated Cox, a few minutes before and a few miles away from the Liberty Party delegates.) Bruner's Liberty Party demanded Harvey cease claiming to be the Liberty Party nominee, promising litigation if he refused. The existence of two Liberty parties severely impeded the campaign, with the party only fundraising $350 ($8,259 in 2025). In November 1932, prior to the election, Bruner's Liberty Party declared that it would not win, blaming the poor fundraising. Spurgeon endorsed Hoover and Webb declared that it would be better for the country if Herbert Hoover was reelected rather than if Franklin D. Roosevelt won the presidency, though he refrained from making a formal endorsement.

==== Platform ====
1. Retention and observance of the entire Constitution of the United States. (Note: The 18th Amendment to the United States Constitution established prohibition. This plank declared the party to be supportive of retaining the amendment and strict enforcement of the Volstead Act.)
2. Government banks, operated for service only.
3. Strict enforcement of the Sherman Anti-trust laws and restraint of trade acts.
4. Cost of production plus a profit for the farmer.
5. A 6-hour day and wages in keeping with industry.
6. Expansion of currency dealing with unemployment and public improvements.
7. Government supervision of public utilities.
8. Protection of investments and capital only when invested in the United States.

The platform of the Liberty Party, with the exception of its first plank, was described as very similar to Franklin D. Roosevelt's then-proposed New Deal. The seventh plank originally called for government ownership of public utilities but it was changed to instead call for supervision at the request of Webb, who believed that government should not directly involve itself in business, except for matters concerning banking.

==== Results ====
Roosevelt defeated Hoover's bid for reelection and won the presidency with 42 states and 57.41% of the popular vote. The Liberty Party appeared on just ten state ballots, and Harvey was present on the ballot or reputed as the nominee in eight of those states, with Webb not appearing on any state ballots. In California and New Mexico, where the presidential short ballot had not yet been adopted, the state Liberty Parties professed support for neither Webb nor Harvey. (Note: In California, the state party had supported Harvey until they heard reports he dropped out of the race. In New Mexico, the state party did not name the candidate their electors intended to support in paperwork, and an investigation after the election failed to uncover it.) In California, the highest vote total for a Liberty Party elector was 9,827 votes, and in New Mexico, the highest vote total for a Liberty Party elector was 389 votes.

== Later years ==
In February 1933, Webb wished the incoming Roosevelt administration the best of luck and said he would serve in it if called upon. In March 1936, Webb was booked to deliver a radio broadcast on Columbia entitled "The Republic Is in Danger—America Prepare!" Webb did so in his capacity as national chairman of the Constitutional Party, an organization whose creation he had called for in a 1931 political pamphlet cowritten with Lowson entitled "The Republic Is in Danger". In 1938, Webb wrote a letter to Roosevelt as a prospective investor in the housing market, complaining that Fannie Mae was making it impossible to invest.

Webb died suddenly on June 15, 1949, at his home in Washington, D.C. He was 79 years old. After his death, Webb was described as forgotten, remembered most often for his presidential campaigns, except around the San Francisco Bay, where he was better remembered for his bridge projects.

== Personal life ==
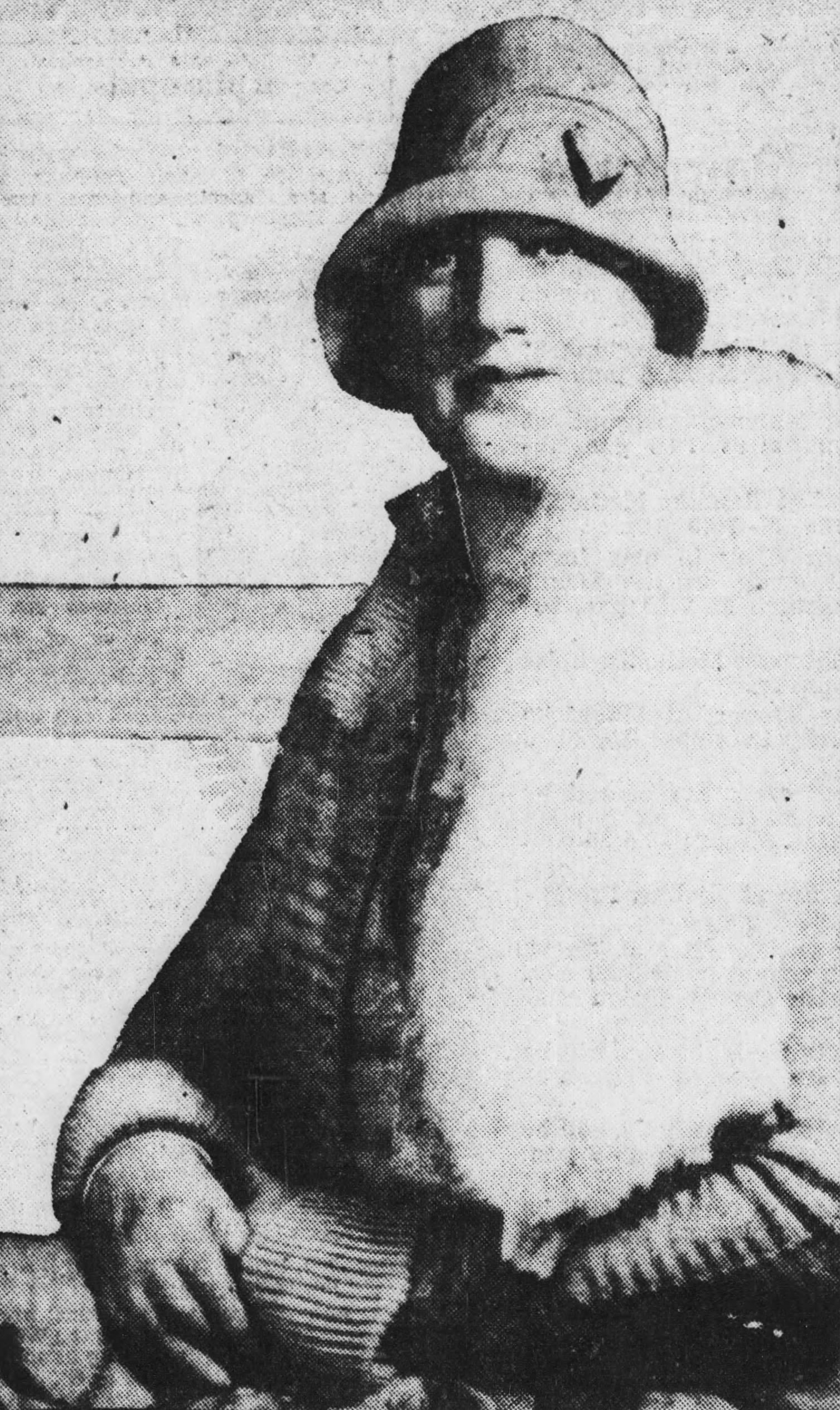
1928 photo of Webb's last wife, Elsa

In 1908, Agnes Hayes divorced from him for reason of desertion. Webb remarried in 1909 to Alice Gilman. Webb later married Ethel L. Webb and she divorced him in 1927, suing for alimony after he received the Farmer–Labor Party's nomination. At some time, an ex-wife sued Webb for spending all her money and hypothecating her jewels. In April 1928, Webb married Elsa Reid, and they remained married until his death.
