= Richard W. Reuter =

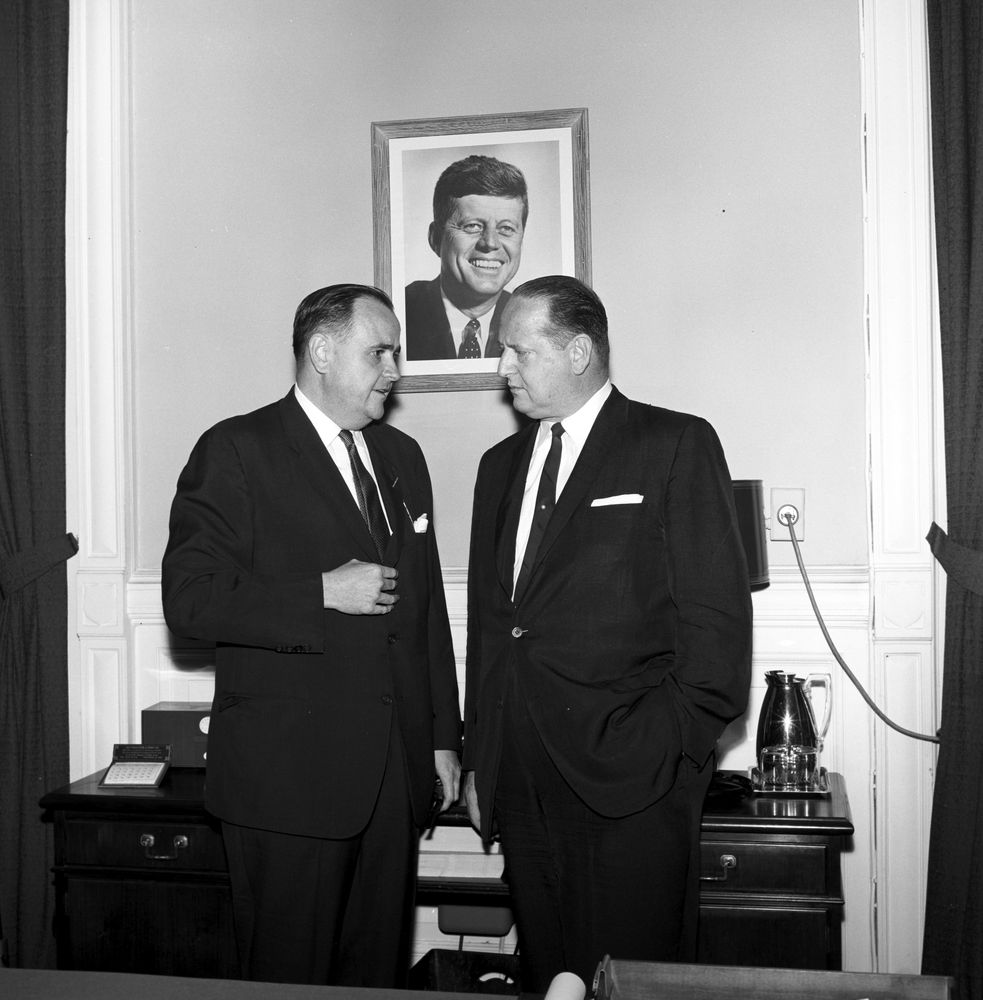
Richard W. Reuter (left) during his swearing in ceremony as director of Food for Peace.

Richard Ward Reuter (1918–2005) was an American executive known for working at relief agencies. A pacifist and a conscientious objector, he worked with the American Friends Service Committee during World War II. He joined CARE in 1946 and served as its Executive Director from 1955 to 1962. In that role he led a revitalizing and repurposing of the organization. He also worked in conjunction with the start of the Peace Corps. He was then appointed by President John F. Kennedy in 1962 to serve as Special Assistant to the President and Director of Food for Peace, succeeding the founding director, George McGovern. He stayed in that role through 1965 when, under President Lyndon B. Johnson, the program was subsumed under the United States Department of State. There he became Special Assistant to the Secretary of State for Food for Peace, until he left in 1966, reportedly dismayed by the direction the food program was taking. After leaving the government, he worked for Kraft Foods from 1967 to 1984, becoming a vice president and director of purchasing.
