= George McGovern =

American politician and historian (1922–2012)

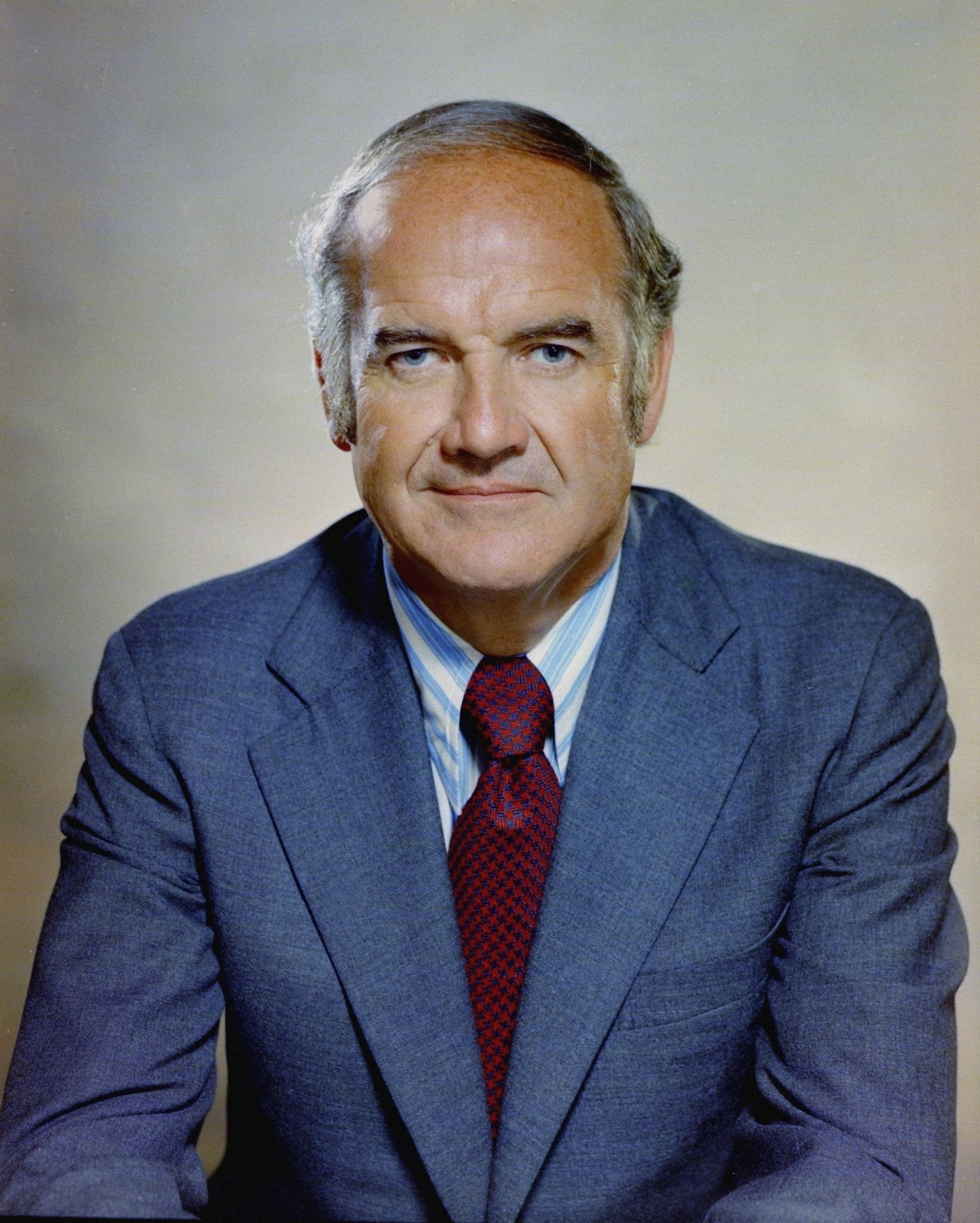
- Official portrait, 1972

United States Senator from South Dakota
- In office January 3, 1963 – January 3, 1981
- Preceded by: Joe Bottum
- Succeeded by: James Abdnor

United States Ambassador to the United Nations Agencies for Food and Agriculture
- In office March 10, 1998 – September 28, 2001
- President: Bill Clinton; George W. Bush
- Preceded by: Thomas A. Forbord
- Succeeded by: Tony P. Hall

Chair of the United States Senate Select Committee on Nutrition and Human Needs
- In office July 1968 – December 1977
- Preceded by: Committee established
- Succeeded by: Committee abolished

Director of Food for Peace
- In office January 21, 1961 – July 18, 1962
- President: John F. Kennedy
- Preceded by: Position established
- Succeeded by: Richard W. Reuter

Member of the U.S. House of Representatives from South Dakota's 1st district
- In office January 3, 1957 – January 3, 1961
- Preceded by: Harold Lovre
- Succeeded by: Ben Reifel

Personal details
- Born: George Stanley McGovern; July 19, 1922 Avon, South Dakota, U.S.
- Died: October 21, 2012 (aged 90) Sioux Falls, South Dakota, U.S.
- Resting place: Rock Creek Cemetery
- Party: Democratic
- Other political affiliations: Progressive (1948)
- Spouse: Eleanor Stegeberg (m. 1943; died 2007)
- Children: 5 with Eleanor; 1 or 2 others (Note: The woman in question moved to Indiana to have the child in secret during 1941. The so-named "Fort Wayne" story circulated as a rumor in political and press circles for years. An FBI background check conducted after McGovern was appointed to the Food for Peace director position within the Kennedy administration included it, and Nixon's 1972 campaign had access to the information but chose not to use it. The existence of the child became known to those around liberal circles such as Ted Van Dyk, and McGovern first informed his wife of the story late in the 1972 campaign, when it was thought that the St. Louis Globe-Democrat might run a story on it (they did not). Hints of the story did become public in 1973, when former White House chief of staff H. R. Haldeman alluded to it during the Senate Watergate Committee hearings; Bob Woodward and Carl Bernstein wrote about it for The Washington Post, including confirmation from a birth certificate, but McGovern issued a denial at that time and the story quickly faded. McGovern eventually told the truth of the episode to his future biographer, Thomas J. Knock, expressing considerable remorse over his involvement. The story became fully public in 2015, three years after McGovern's death, following release of McGovern's FBI files. The tale of the European secret child is according to Donald C. Simmons Jr., a close friend, associate, and co-author of McGovern's in his final years. This had not been known in political circles, and first appeared in a story in the Black Hills Pioneer in 2015, soon after the story about the first secret child become public. Per Simmons, the European child did not survive into adulthood and McGovern had a haunted feeling at seeing the grave. It is not clear if there is any corroborating evidence regarding this second secret child.)
- Education: Dakota Wesleyan University (BA); Garrett Theological Seminary (attended); Northwestern University (MA, PhD)

Military service
- Branch/service: United States Army Air Forces
- Years of service: 1943–1945
- Rank: First lieutenant
- Unit: Fifteenth Air Force; 455th Bombardment Group; 741st Bomb Squadron
- Battles/wars: World War II; Mediterranean theater; European theater
- Awards: Distinguished Flying Cross; Air Medal (4)

George Stanley McGovern (July 19, 1922 – October 21, 2012) was an American politician, diplomat, and historian from South Dakota who served in both chambers of the United States Congress, first as a member of the United States House of Representatives representing South Dakota's 1st congressional district from 1957 to 1961, and then as a United States Senator from 1963 to 1981. McGovern also served as the director of Food for Peace in 1961 and 1962 under President John F. Kennedy. A member of the Democratic Party, he was the party's presidential nominee in the 1972 presidential election.

McGovern was born in Avon, South Dakota, and grew up in the near city of Mitchell, where he became a renowned debater. He volunteered for the U.S. Army Air Forces upon the country's entry into World War II. As a B-24 Liberator pilot, he flew 35 missions over German-occupied Europe from a base in Italy. Among the medals he received was a Distinguished Flying Cross for making a hazardous emergency landing of his damaged plane and saving his crew. After the war, he earned degrees from Dakota Wesleyan University and Northwestern University, culminating in a PhD, and served as a history professor. He was elected to the U.S. House of Representatives in 1956 and re-elected in 1958. After a failed bid for the U.S. Senate in 1960, he was a successful candidate in 1962.

As a senator, McGovern was a prominent example of modern American liberalism. He became most known for his outspoken opposition to the growing U.S. involvement in the Vietnam War. He staged a brief nomination run in the 1968 presidential election as a stand-in for the assassinated Robert F. Kennedy. The subsequent McGovern–Fraser Commission fundamentally altered the presidential nominating process, by increasing the number of caucuses and primaries and reducing the influence of party insiders. The McGovern–Hatfield Amendment sought to end the Vietnam War by legislative means but was defeated in 1970 and 1971. McGovern's long-shot, grassroots-based 1972 presidential campaign found triumph in gaining the Democratic nomination but left the party split ideologically, and the failed vice-presidential pick of Thomas Eagleton undermined McGovern's credibility. In the general election, McGovern lost to incumbent President Richard Nixon in one of the biggest landslides in U.S. electoral history. Although re-elected to the Senate in 1968 and 1974, McGovern was defeated in his bid for a fourth term in 1980.

Beginning with his experiences in war-torn Italy and continuing throughout his career, McGovern was involved in issues related to agriculture, food, nutrition, and hunger. As the first director of the Food for Peace program in 1961, McGovern oversaw the distribution of U.S. surpluses to the needy abroad and was instrumental in the creation of the United Nations-run World Food Programme. As sole chairman of the Senate Select Committee on Nutrition and Human Needs from 1968 to 1977, McGovern publicized the problem of hunger within the United States and issued the "McGovern Report", which led to a new set of nutritional guidelines for Americans. McGovern later served as U.S. ambassador to the United Nations Agencies for Food and Agriculture from 1998 to 2001 and was appointed the first UN global ambassador on world hunger by the World Food Programme in 2001. The McGovern–Dole International Food for Education and Child Nutrition Program has provided school meals for millions of children in dozens of countries since 2000 and resulted in McGovern's being named World Food Prize co‑laureate in 2008. He died at the age of 90 in October 2012.

== Early life and education ==
McGovern was born in the 600‑person farming community of Avon, South Dakota. His father, the Rev. Joseph C. McGovern, born in 1868, was pastor of the local Wesleyan Methodist Church there. Joseph, the son of an alcoholic who had immigrated from Ireland, had grown up in several states, working in coal mines from the age of nine and parentless from the age of thirteen. He had been a professional baseball player in the minor leagues, (Note: Joseph McGovern was a second baseman for a team in Des Moines, Iowa, but gave it up in 1891 or 1892.) but had given it up due to his teammates' heavy drinking, gambling, and womanizing, and entered the seminary instead. George's mother was the former Frances McLean, born c. 1890 and initially raised in Ontario, Canada; her family had later moved to Calgary, Alberta, and then she came to South Dakota looking for work as a secretary. George was the second oldest of four children. Joseph McGovern's salary never reached $100 per month, and he often received compensation in the form of potatoes, cabbages, or other food items. Joseph and Frances McGovern were both firm Republicans, but were not politically active or doctrinaire.

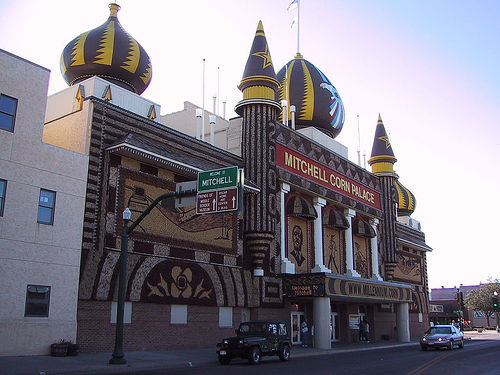
The Corn Palace, a longtime sight of McGovern's hometown of Mitchell, South Dakota

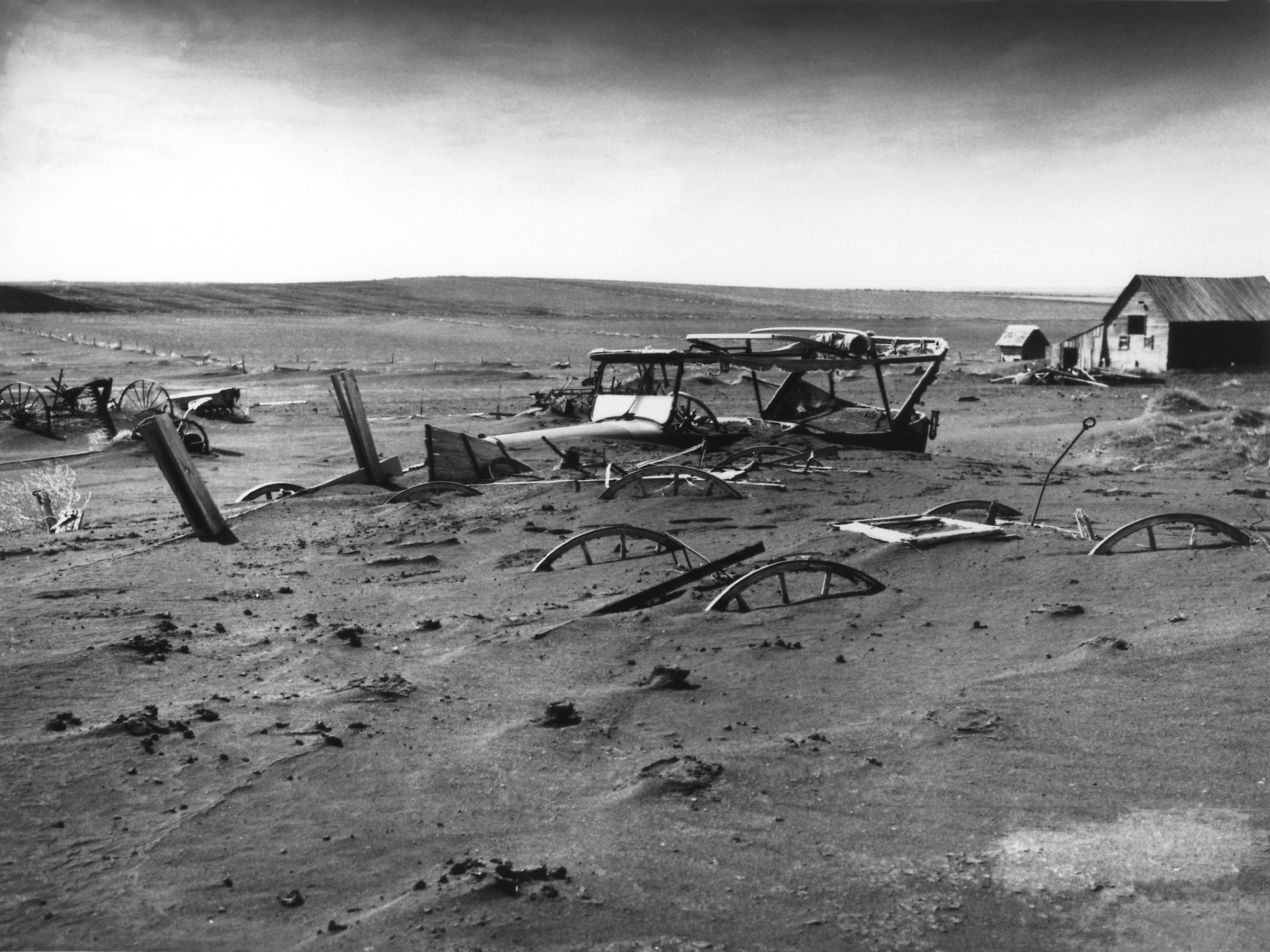
Effects of a 1936 Dust Bowl storm in nearby Gregory County, South Dakota

When George was about three years old, the family moved to Calgary for a while to be near Frances's ailing mother, and he formed memories of events such as the Calgary Stampede. When George was six, the family returned to the United States and moved to Mitchell, South Dakota, a community of 12,000. McGovern attended public schools there and was an average student. He was painfully shy as a child and was afraid to speak in class during first grade. His only reproachable behavior was going to see movies, which were among the worldly amusements forbidden to good Wesleyan Methodists. Otherwise he had a normal childhood marked by visits to the renowned Mitchell Corn Palace and what he later termed "a sense of belonging to a particular place and knowing your part in it". He would long remember the Dust Bowl storms and grasshopper plagues that swept the prairie states during the Great Depression. The McGovern family lived on the edge of the poverty line for much of the 1920s and 1930s. Growing up so close to privation gave young George a lifelong sympathy for underpaid workers and struggling farmers. He was influenced by the currents of populism and agrarian unrest, as well as the "practical divinity" teachings of cleric John Wesley that sought to fight poverty, injustice, and ignorance.

McGovern attended Mitchell High School, where he was a solid but unspectacular member of the track team. A turning point came when his tenth-grade English teacher recommended him to the debate team, where he became quite active. His high-school debate coach, a history teacher who capitalized on McGovern's interest in that subject, proved to be a great influence in his life, and McGovern spent many hours honing his meticulous, if colorless, forensic style. McGovern and his debating partner won events in his area and gained renown in a state where debating was passionately followed by the general public. Debate changed McGovern's life, giving him a chance to explore ideas to their logical end, broadening his perspective, and instilling a sense of personal and social confidence. He graduated in 1940 in the top ten percent of his class.

McGovern enrolled at small Dakota Wesleyan University in Mitchell and became a star student there. He supplemented a forensic scholarship by working a variety of odd jobs. With World War II under way overseas and feeling insecure about his own courage, (Note: In the seventh grade, a gym teacher had called McGovern a "physical coward" for being afraid to dive headfirst and somersault over a gymnastics vaulting horse; the incident had troubled McGovern psychologically and part of his motivation in taking up flying was to prove himself.) McGovern took flying lessons in an Aeronca aircraft and received a pilot's license through the government's Civilian Pilot Training Program. McGovern recalled: "Frankly, I was scared to death on that first solo flight. But when I walked away from it, I had an enormous feeling of satisfaction that I had taken the thing off the ground and landed it without tearing the wings off." In late 1940 or early 1941, McGovern had pre-marital sex with an acquaintance that resulted in her giving birth to a daughter during 1941, although this did not become public knowledge during his lifetime. In April 1941 McGovern began dating fellow student Eleanor Stegeberg, who had grown up in Woonsocket, South Dakota. They had first encountered each other during a high school debate in which Eleanor and her twin sister Ila defeated McGovern and his partner.

McGovern was listening to a radio broadcast of the New York Philharmonic Orchestra for a sophomore-year music appreciation class when he heard the news of the December 7, 1941, attack on Pearl Harbor. In January 1942 he drove with nine other students to Omaha, Nebraska, and volunteered to join the United States Army Air Forces. The military accepted him, but they did not yet have enough airfields, aircraft, or instructors to start training all the volunteers, so McGovern stayed at Dakota Wesleyan. George and Eleanor became engaged, but initially decided not to marry until the war was over. During his sophomore year, McGovern won the statewide intercollegiate South Dakota Peace Oratory Contest with a speech called "My Brother's Keeper", which was later selected by the National Council of Churches as one of the nation's twelve best orations of 1942. Smart, handsome, and well liked, McGovern was elected president of his sophomore class and voted "Glamour Boy" during his junior year. In February 1943, during his junior year, he and a partner won a regional debate tournament at North Dakota State University that featured competitors from thirty-two schools across a dozen states; upon his return to campus, he discovered that the Army had finally called him up.

== Military service ==
=== Groundschool and trainers ===
Soon thereafter McGovern was sworn in as a private at Fort Snelling in Minnesota. He spent a month at Jefferson Barracks Military Post in Missouri and then five months at Southern Illinois Normal University in Carbondale, Illinois, for ground school training. McGovern later maintained that both the academic work and physical training were the toughest he ever experienced. He spent two months at a base in San Antonio, Texas, and then went to Hatbox Field in Muskogee, Oklahoma, for basic flying school, training in a single-engined PT‑19. McGovern married Eleanor Stegeberg on October 31, 1943, during a three-day leave (lonely and in love, the couple had decided to not wait any longer). His father presided over the ceremony at the Methodist church in Woonsocket.

After three months in Muskogee, McGovern went to Coffeyville Army Airfield in Kansas for a further three months of training on the BT‑13. Around April 1944, McGovern went on to advanced flying school at Pampa Army Airfield in Texas for twin-engine training on the AT‑17 and AT‑9. Throughout, Air Cadet McGovern showed skill as a pilot, with his exceptionally good depth perception aiding him. Eleanor McGovern followed him to these duty stations, and was present when he received his wings and was commissioned a second lieutenant.

=== Training in the B-24 ===
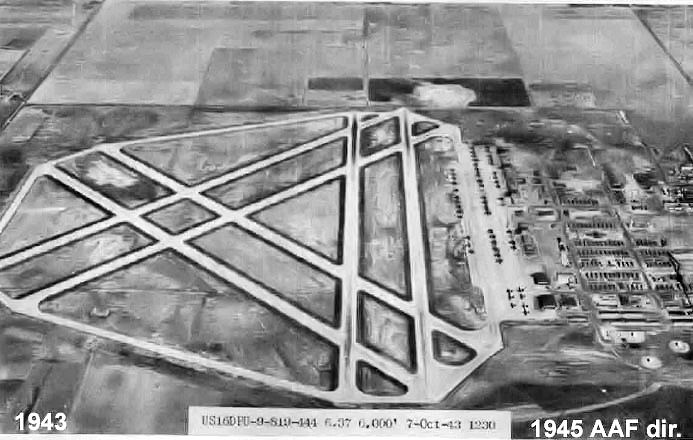
Liberal Army Airfield in Kansas during World War II, where McGovern learned to fly the B-24

McGovern was assigned to Liberal Army Airfield in Kansas and its transition school to learn to fly the B‑24 Liberator, an assignment he was pleased with. McGovern recalled later: "Learning how to fly the B‑24 was the toughest part of the training. It was a difficult airplane to fly, physically, because in the early part of the war they didn't have hydraulic controls. If you can imagine driving a Mack truck without any power steering or power brakes, that's about what it was like at the controls. It was the biggest bomber we had at the time." Eleanor was constantly afraid. Accidents while training claimed a huge toll of airmen over the course of the war.

This schooling was followed by a stint at Lincoln Army Airfield in Nebraska, where McGovern met his B-24 crew. Traveling around the country and mixing with people from different backgrounds proved to be a broadening experience for McGovern and others of his generation. The USAAF sped up training times for McGovern and others, owing to the heavy losses that bombing missions were suffering over Europe. Despite, and partly because of, the risk that McGovern might not come back from combat, the McGoverns decided to have a child, and Eleanor became pregnant. In June 1944, McGovern's crew received final training at Mountain Home Army Air Field in Idaho. They then shipped out via Camp Patrick Henry in Virginia, where McGovern found history books with which to fill downtime, especially during the trip overseas on a slow troopship.

=== Italy ===
In September 1944 McGovern joined the 741st Squadron of the 455th Bombardment Group of the Fifteenth Air Force, stationed at San Giovanni Airfield near Cerignola in the Apulia region of Italy. There he and his crew found a starving, disease-ridden local population wracked by the ill fortunes of war and far worse off than anything they had seen back home during the Depression. Those sights would form part of his later motivation to fight hunger. Starting on November 11, 1944, McGovern flew 35 missions over enemy territory from San Giovanni, the first five as co-pilot for an experienced crew and the rest as pilot for his own plane, known as the Dakota Queen after his wife Eleanor. His targets were in Austria; Czechoslovakia; Nazi Germany; Hungary; Poland; and northern, German-controlled Italy, and were often either oil refinery complexes or rail marshaling yards, all as part of the U.S. strategic bombing campaign in Europe. The eight- or nine-hour missions were grueling tests of endurance for pilots and crew, and while German fighter aircraft were a diminished threat by this time as compared with earlier in the war, his missions often faced heavy anti-aircraft artillery fire that filled the sky with flak bursts.

On McGovern's December 15 mission over Linz, his second as pilot, a piece of shrapnel from flak came through the windshield and missed fatally wounding him by only a few inches. The following day on a mission to Brüx, he nearly collided with another bomber during close-formation flying in complete cloud cover. The following day, he was recommended for a medal after surviving a blown wheel on the always-dangerous B-24 take-off, completing a mission over Germany, and then landing without further damage to the plane. On a December 20 mission against the Škoda Works at Pilsen, Czechoslovakia, McGovern's plane had one engine out and another in flames after being hit by flak. Unable to return to Italy, McGovern flew to a British airfield on Vis, a small island in the Adriatic Sea off the Yugoslav coast that was controlled by Josip Broz Tito's Partisans. The short field, normally used by small fighter planes, was so unforgiving to four-engined aircraft that many of the bomber crews who tried to make emergency landings there perished. But McGovern successfully landed, saving his crew, a feat for which he was awarded the Distinguished Flying Cross.

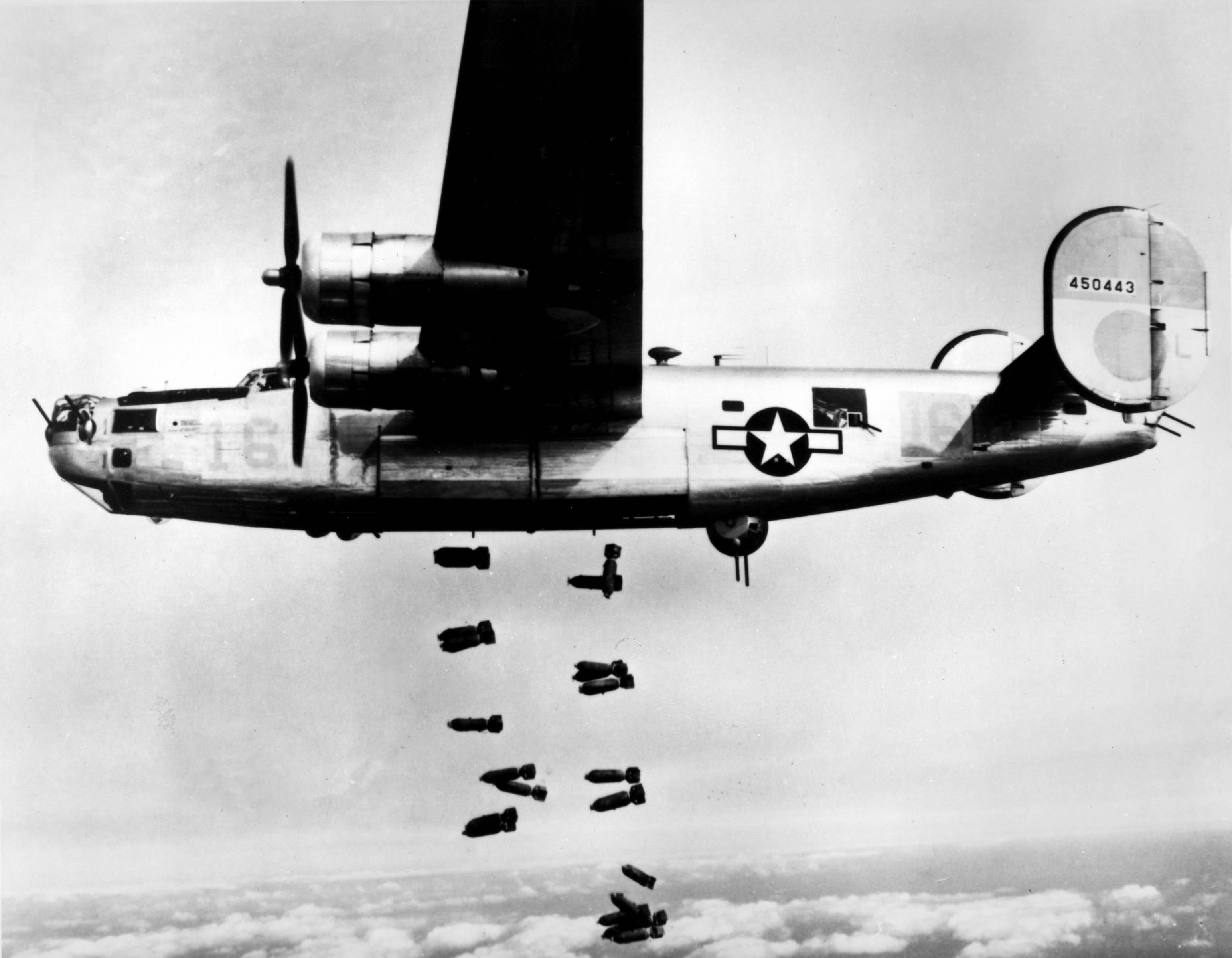
A B‑24 Liberator of the Fifteenth Air Force's 451st Bombardment Group (not McGovern's group, but also stationed in Italy), on a March 1945 mission over Germany

In January 1945 McGovern used R&R time to see every sight that he could in Rome, and to participate in an audience with the pope. Bad weather prevented many missions from being carried out during the winter, and during such downtime McGovern spent much time reading and discussing how the war had come about. He resolved that if he survived it, he would become a history professor. In February, McGovern was promoted to first lieutenant. On March 14 McGovern had an incident over Austria in which he accidentally bombed a family farmhouse when a jammed bomb inadvertently released above the structure and destroyed it, an event that haunted McGovern. Four decades later, after McGovern related the incident during an Austrian television program and indicated he was still haunted by it, the owner of the farm called the television station to say that his farm was hit by that bomb but that no one had been hurt and the farmer felt that it had been worth the price if that event helped achieve the defeat of Nazi Germany in some small way. McGovern said finding this out was "an enormous release".

On returning to base from the flight, McGovern was told his first child Ann had been born four days earlier. April 25 saw McGovern's 35th mission, which marked fulfillment of the Fifteenth Air Force's requirement for a combat tour, against heavily defended Linz. The sky turned black and red with flak – McGovern later said, "Hell can't be any worse than that" – and the Dakota Queen was hit multiple times, resulting in 110 holes in its fuselage and wings and an inoperative hydraulic system. McGovern's waist gunner was injured, and his flight engineer was so unnerved by his experience that he would subsequently be hospitalized with battle fatigue, but McGovern managed to bring back the plane safely with the assistance of an improvised landing technique. According to a McGovern associate speaking after McGovern's passing, sometime during his wartime experiences in Europe, McGovern had an extramarital affair and fathered a child with an unknown woman.

=== Postwar relief ===
In May and June 1945, following the end of the European war, McGovern continued with the 741st Bomb Squadron delivering surplus food and supplies near Trieste in Northeastern Italy; this was then trucked to the hungry in nearby locations, including to German prisoners of war. McGovern liked making these relief flights, as it gave him a way to address the kinds of deprivations he had witnessed when first arriving in Italy. He then flew back to the United States with his crew. McGovern was discharged from the Army Air Forces in July 1945, with the rank of first lieutenant. He was also awarded the Air Medal with three oak leaf clusters, one instance of which was for the safe landing on his final mission.

== Later education and early career ==
Upon coming home, McGovern returned to Dakota Wesleyan University, aided by the G.I. Bill, and graduated from there in June 1946 with a B.A. degree magna cum laude. For a while he suffered from nightmares about flying through flak barrages or his plane being on fire. He continued with debate, again winning the state Peace Oratory Contest with a speech entitled "From Cave to Cave" that presented a Christian-influenced Wilsonian outlook. The couple's second daughter, Susan, was born in March 1946.

McGovern switched from Wesleyan Methodism to less fundamentalist regular Methodism. Influenced by Walter Rauschenbusch and the Social Gospel movement, McGovern began divinity studies at Garrett–Evangelical Theological Seminary in Evanston, Illinois, near Chicago. Among Methodist seminaries, Garrett tended towards social involvement paired with a theologically liberal approach, and many of the students there leaned towards pacifism. McGovern was influenced by the weekly sermons of a well-known local minister, Ernest Fremont Tittle, and the ideas of Boston Personalism. McGovern preached as a Methodist student supply minister at Diamond Lake Church in Mundelein, Illinois, during 1946 and 1947, but became dissatisfied by the minutiae of his pastoral duties. In late 1947 McGovern left the ministry and enrolled in graduate studies at Northwestern University in Evanston, where he also worked as a teaching assistant. The relatively small history program there was among the best in the country, and McGovern took courses given by noted academics Ray Allen Billington, Richard W. Leopold, and L. S. Stavrianos. He received an Master of Arts in history in 1949.

McGovern then returned to his alma mater, Dakota Wesleyan, and became a professor of history and political science. With the assistance of a Hearst fellowship for 1949–50, he continued pursuing graduate studies during summers and other free time. The couple's third daughter, Teresa, was born in June 1949. Eleanor McGovern began to suffer from bouts of major depressive disorder but continued to assume the large share of household and child-rearing duties. McGovern earned a Ph.D. in history from Northwestern University in 1953. (Note: McGovern is one of only two major party presidential nominees to have earned a Ph.D., the other being Woodrow Wilson.) His 450-page dissertation, The Colorado Coal Strike, 1913–1914, was a sympathetic account of the miners' revolt against the Rockefeller family interests in the Colorado Coalfield War. His thesis advisor, noted historian Arthur S. Link, later said he had not seen a better student than McGovern in 26 years of teaching. McGovern was influenced not only by Link and the "consensus history" of American historians but also by the previous generation of progressive historians. Most of his future analyses of world events would be informed by his training as a historian, as well as his personal experiences during the Great Depression and World War II. Meanwhile, McGovern had become a popular if politically outspoken teacher at Dakota Wesleyan, with students dedicating the college yearbook to him in 1952.

Nominally a Republican growing up, McGovern began to admire Democratic president Franklin D. Roosevelt during World War II, even though he supported Roosevelt's opponent Thomas Dewey in the 1944 U.S. presidential election. (Note: In his autobiography, McGovern described his reaction upon hearing of Roosevelt's death in April 1945 while stationed in Italy during the war: "Most of us had never really known the United States except with FDR as President. We did not think of him as a politician. He was that magnificent voice of the fireside chat, who, along with Winston Churchill, inspired all those who stood for freedom and decency in the war. What would the United States be like without him?") At Northwestern, his exposure to the work of China scholars John King Fairbank and Owen Lattimore had convinced him that unrest in Southeast Asia was homegrown and that U.S. foreign policy toward Asia was counterproductive. Discouraged by the onset of the Cold War, and never thinking well of incumbent president Harry S. Truman, in the 1948 U.S. presidential election McGovern was attracted to the campaign of former vice president and secretary of agriculture Henry A. Wallace. He wrote columns supporting Wallace in the Mitchell Daily Republic and attended the Wallace Progressive Party's first national convention as a delegate. There he became disturbed by aspects of the convention atmosphere, decades later referring to "a certain rigidity and fanaticism on the part of a few of the strategists." He remained a public supporter of Wallace and the Progressive Party afterward. As Wallace was kept off the ballot in Illinois where McGovern was now registered, McGovern did not vote in the general election.

By 1952, McGovern was coming to think of himself as a Democrat. He was captivated by a radio broadcast of Governor Adlai Stevenson II's speech accepting the presidential nomination at the 1952 Democratic National Convention. He immediately dedicated himself to Stevenson's campaign, publishing seven articles in the Mitchell Daily Republic newspaper outlining the historical issues that separated the Democratic Party from the Republicans. The McGoverns named their only son, Steven, born immediately after the convention, after his new hero. (Note: McGovern's admiration for Stevenson was lined with his antipathy towards his eventual antagonist: "I have loathed Richard Nixon since he first came on the national scene wielding his red brush in 1946, but I especially resented his cheap insults to Adlai Stevenson – my first genuine political hero".) Although Stevenson lost the election, McGovern remained active in politics, believing that "the engine of progress in our time in America is the Democratic Party." In early 1953, McGovern left a tenure-track position at the university to become executive secretary of the South Dakota Democratic Party, the state chair having recruited him after reading his articles. Democrats in the state were at a low, holding no statewide offices and only 2 of the 110 seats in the state legislature. Friends and political figures had counseled McGovern against making the move, but despite his mild, unassuming manner, McGovern had an ambitious nature and was intent upon starting a political career of his own. (Note: The decision to enter politics was not uncommon among those of what was later dubbed "The Greatest Generation"; it was a natural destination for those who made sacrifices and learned lessons during the war, and was not limited to those of any particular political ideology.)

McGovern spent the following years rebuilding and revitalizing the party, building up a large list of voter contacts via frequent travel around the state. Democrats showed improvement in the 1954 elections, winning 25 seats in the state legislature. From 1954 to 1956 he also was on a political organization advisory group for the Democratic National Committee. The McGoverns' fifth and final child, Mary, was born in 1955.

== U.S. House of Representatives (1957–1961) ==
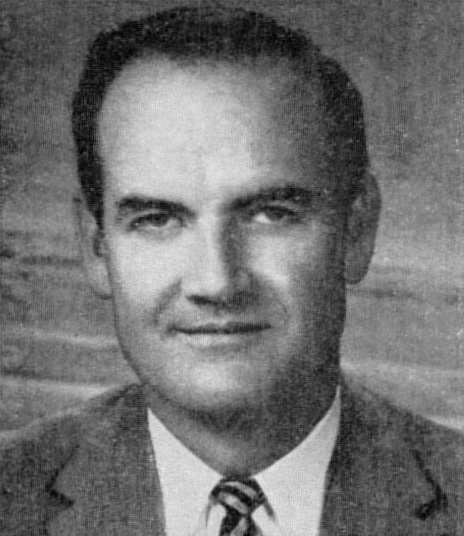
McGovern as a freshman Representative, 1957

In 1956, McGovern sought elective office himself, and ran for the House of Representatives from South Dakota's 1st congressional district, which consisted of the counties east of the Missouri River. He faced four-term incumbent Republican Party representative Harold Lovre. Aided by the voter lists he had earlier accumulated, McGovern ran a low-budget campaign, spending $12,000 while borrowing $5,000. His quiet personality appealed to voters he met, while Lovre suffered from a general unhappiness over the Eisenhower administration farm policy. When polls showed McGovern gaining, Lovre's campaign implied that McGovern's support for admitting China to the United Nations and his past support for Henry Wallace meant that McGovern was a communist appeaser or sympathizer. In his closing speech, McGovern responded: "I have always despised communism and every other ruthless tyranny over the mind and spirit of man." McGovern staged an upset victory, gaining 116,516 votes to his opponent's 105,835, and became the first Democrat elected to Congress from South Dakota in 22 years. The McGoverns established a home in Chevy Chase, Maryland.

Entering the 85th United States Congress, McGovern became a member of the United States House Committee on Education and Workforce. As a representative, McGovern was attentive to his district. He became a staunch supporter of higher commodity prices, farm price supports, grain storage programs, and beef import controls, believing that such stored commodities programs guarded against drought and similar emergencies. He favored rural development, federal aid to small business and to education, and medical coverage for the aged under Social Security. In 1957 he traveled and studied conditions in the Middle East under a fellowship from the American Palestine Committee. McGovern first allied with the Kennedy family by supporting a House version of Massachusetts U.S. Senate member John F. Kennedy's eventually unsuccessful labor reform bill.

In his 1958 reelection campaign, McGovern faced a strong challenge from South Dakota's two-term Republican governor and World War II Medal of Honor recipient Joe Foss, who was initially considered the favorite to win. McGovern ran an effective campaign that showcased his political strengths of having firm beliefs and the ability to articulate them in debates and on the stump. He prevailed with a slightly larger margin than two years before. In the 86th United States Congress, McGovern was assigned to the United States House Committee on Agriculture. The longtime chairman of the committee, Harold D. Cooley, would subsequently say, "I cannot recall a single member of Congress who has fought more vigorously or intelligently for American farmers than Congressman McGovern." He helped pass a new food-stamp law. He was one of nine representatives from Congress to the NATO Parliamentary Assembly conferences of 1958 and 1959. Along with Senator Hubert H. Humphrey, McGovern strongly advocated a reconstruction of Public Law 480 under Food for Peace (an agricultural surplus act that had come into being under Eisenhower) with a greater emphasis on feeding the hungry around the world, the establishment of an executive office to run operations, and the goal of promoting peace and stability around the world. During his time in the House, McGovern was regarded as a liberal overall, and voted in accordance with the rated positions of Americans for Democratic Action (ADA) 34 times and against 3 times. (Note: "Voting Records". Americans for Democratic Action. Archived from the original on August 30, 2017.. Voting records for years 1957 through 1960. At the time the ADA did not give a "score", although by their later methods, his score for the House years would be 87, as McGovern was also absent for two rated votes.) Two of the themes of his House career, improvements for rural America and the war on hunger, would be defining ones of his legislative career and public life.

McGovern did not vote on the initial House bill for the Civil Rights Act of 1957, but voted in favor of the Senate amendment to the bill in August 1957. McGovern voted in favor initial House bill for the Civil Rights Act of 1960, but did not vote on the Senate amendment to the bill in April 1960. In 1960, McGovern decided to run for the U.S. Senate and challenge the Republican incumbent Karl Mundt, a formidable figure in South Dakota politics whom McGovern loathed as an old-style McCarthyite. The race centered mostly on rural issues, but John F. Kennedy's Catholicism was a drawback at the top of the ticket in the mostly Protestant state. McGovern made careless charges during the campaign, and the press turned against him; he would say eleven years later, "It was my worst campaign. I hated [Mundt] so much I lost my sense of balance." McGovern was defeated in the November 1960 election, gaining 145,217 votes to Mundt's 160,579, but the margin was one third of Kennedy's loss to Vice President Richard M. Nixon in the state's presidential contest.

== Food for Peace director (1961–1962) ==
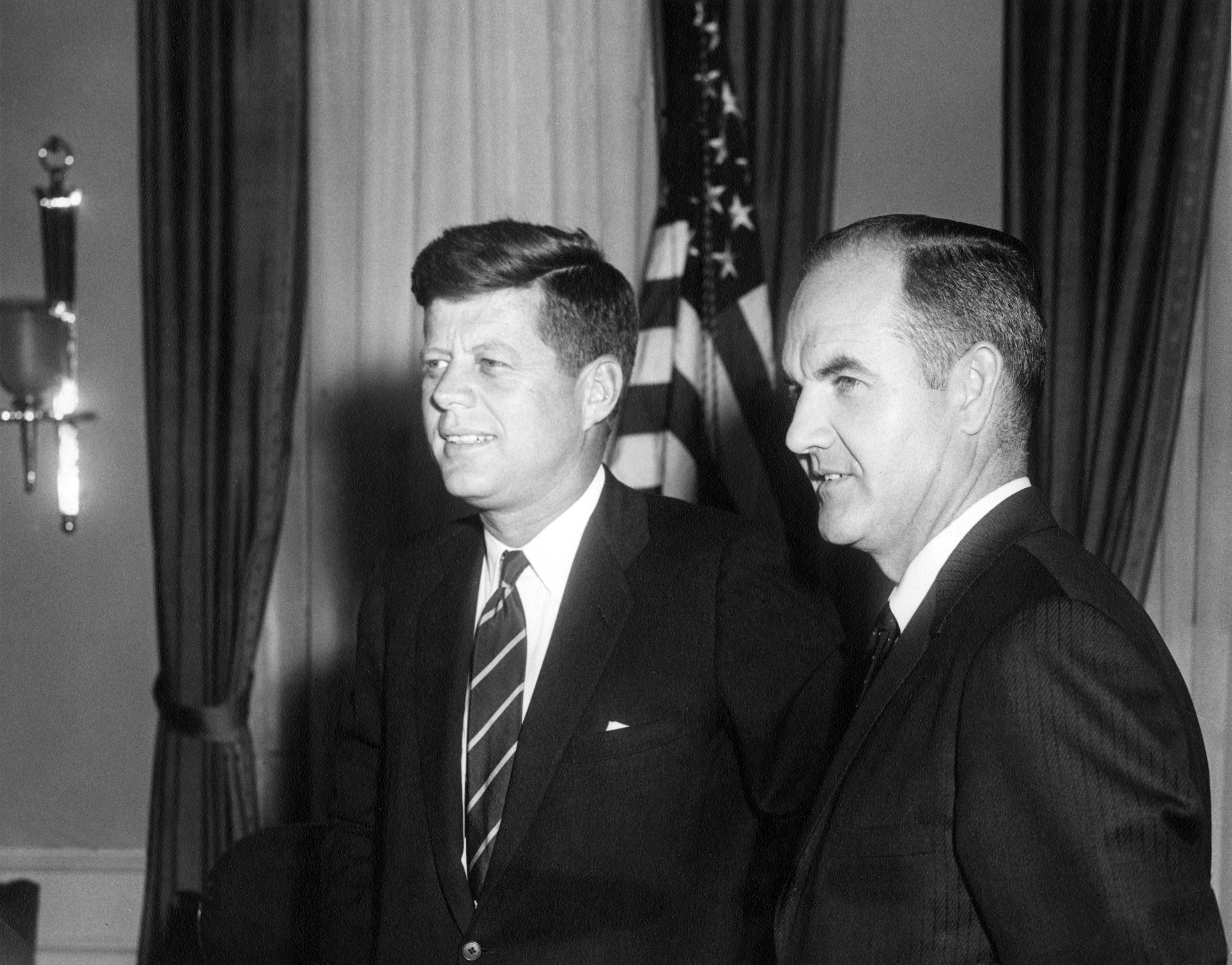
McGovern as Food for Peace director in 1961, with President John F. Kennedy

Having relinquished his House seat to run for the Senate, McGovern was available for a position in the new Kennedy administration. (Note: McGovern first indicated his interest in becoming Secretary of Agriculture, and gained the backing of some farm groups as well as the support of Robert F. Kennedy. The president-elect wanted to appoint him, but others felt that McGovern at age 38 lacked sufficient seniority. By the time of Kennedy's selection, McGovern was happy with the lesser position of Food for Peace director, as he had come to realize that Secretary of Agriculture was usually a difficult job and a dead end for political careers.) McGovern was picked to become a special assistant to the president and first director of Kennedy's high-priority Food for Peace program, which realized what McGovern had been advocating in the House. McGovern assumed the post on January 21, 1961.

As director, McGovern urged the greater use of food to enable foreign economic development, saying, "We should thank God that we have a food abundance and use the over-supply among the underprivileged at home and abroad." He found space for the program in the Executive Office Building rather than be subservient to either the United States Department of State or United States Department of Agriculture. McGovern worked with deputy director James W. Symington from Missouri and Kennedy advisor Arthur M. Schlesinger Jr. in visiting South America to discuss surplus grain distribution, and attended meetings of the United Nations Food and Agriculture Organization. In June 1961, McGovern became seriously ill with hepatitis, contracted from an infected White House dispensary needle used to give him inoculations for his South American trip; he was hospitalized and unable to come to his office for two months; his campaign disguised the condition by saying it was a mild kidney infection.

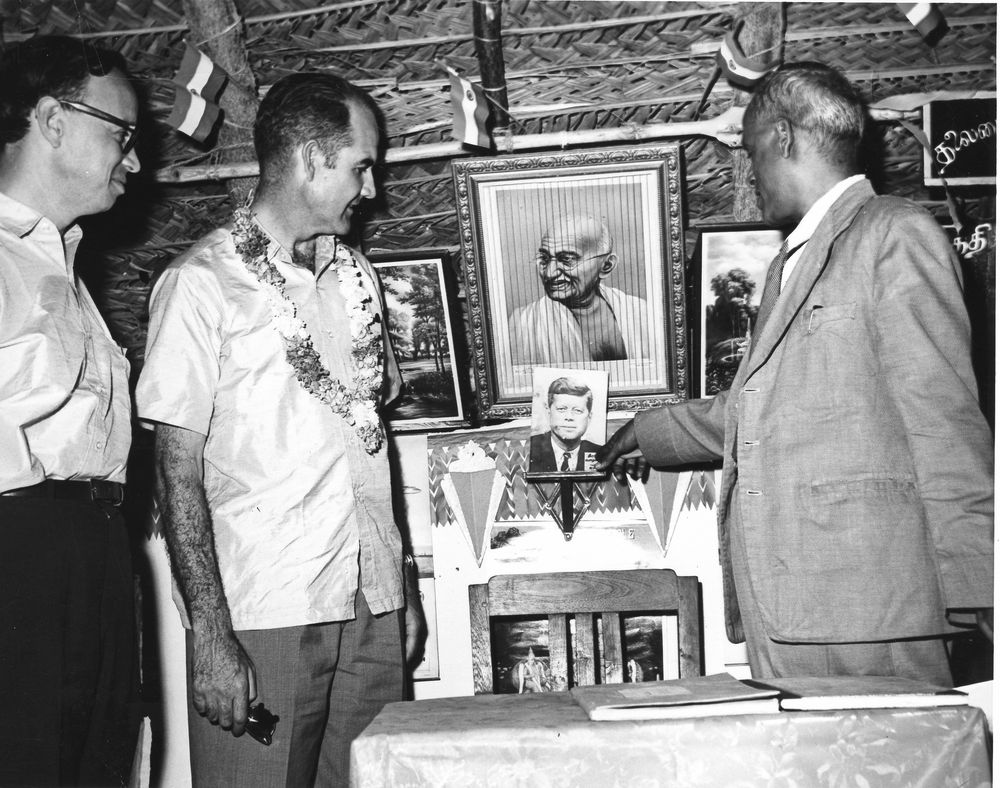
McGovern with Arthur M. Schlesinger, Jr. in Southern India in February 1962, seeing a photograph of President Kennedy enshrined beneath one of Mahatma Gandhi

By the close of 1961, the Food for Peace program was operating in a dozen countries, and 10 million more people had been fed with American surplus than the year before. In February 1962, McGovern visited India and oversaw an expanded school meal program thanks to Food for Peace. Subsequently, one in five Indian schoolchildren would be fed from it; by mid-1962, it fed 35 million children around the world. During an audience in Rome, Pope John XXIII warmly praised McGovern's work, and the distribution program was also popular among South Dakota's wheat farmers. In addition, McGovern was instrumental in the creation of the United Nations-run World Food Programme in December 1961; it started distributing food to affected regions of the world the following year and would go on to become the largest humanitarian agency fighting hunger worldwide.

Administration was never McGovern's strength, and he was restless for another try at the Senate. With the approval of President Kennedy, McGovern resigned his post on July 18, 1962. Kennedy said that under McGovern the program had "become a vital force in the world", improving living conditions and economies of allies and creating "a powerful barrier to the spread of Communism". Columnist Drew Pearson wrote that it was one of the "most spectacular achievements of the young Kennedy administration", while Schlesinger would later write that Food for Peace had been "the greatest unseen weapon of Kennedy's third-world policy".

== U.S. Senate (1963–1981) ==
=== 1962 election and early years as a senator ===
In April 1962, McGovern announced he would run for election to South Dakota's other Senate seat, intending to face incumbent Republican Francis Case. Case died in June, and McGovern instead faced an appointed senator, former lieutenant governor Joe Bottum. Much of the campaign revolved around policies of the Kennedy administration and its New Frontier; Bottum accused the Kennedy family of trying to buy the Senate seat. McGovern appealed to those worried about the outflux of young people from the state, and had the strong support of the National Farmers Union. Polls showed Bottum slightly ahead throughout the race, and McGovern was hampered by a recurrence of his hepatitis problem in the final weeks of the campaign. (During this hospitalization, McGovern read Theodore H. White's classic The Making of the President 1960, and for the first time began thinking about running for the office someday.) Eleanor McGovern campaigned for her ailing husband and may have preserved his chance of winning. The November 1962 election result was very close and required a recount, but McGovern's 127,458 votes prevailed by a margin of 597, making him the first Democratic senator from the state in 26 years and only the third since statehood in 1889.

When he joined the Senate in January 1963 for the 88th United States Congress, McGovern was seated on the United States Senate Committee on Agriculture, Nutrition, and Forestry and the United States Senate Committee on Energy and Natural Resources. On the Agriculture Committee, McGovern supported high farm prices, full parity, and controls on beef importation, as well as the administration's Feed Grains Acreage Diversion Program. McGovern had a fractious relationship with Secretary of Agriculture Orville Freeman, who was less sympathetic to farmers; McGovern's 1966 resolution to informally scold Freeman made the senator popular back in his home state. Fellow new senator Edward M. Kennedy saw McGovern as a serious voice on farm policy and often sought McGovern's guidance on agriculture-related votes. McGovern was largely inactive on the Interior Committee until 1967, when he was given the chairmanship of the subcommittee on Indian affairs; however, Interior Committee chairman Henry M. Jackson, who did not get along with McGovern personally or politically, refused to allow McGovern his own staff, limiting his effectiveness. McGovern regretted not accomplishing more for South Dakota's 30,000 Sioux Indians, although after a McGovern-introduced resolution on Indian self-determination passed in 1969, the Oglala Sioux named McGovern "Great White Eagle."

In his first speech on the Senate floor in March 1963, McGovern praised Kennedy's Alliance for Progress initiative but spoke out against Cuba–United States relations, saying that it suffered from "our Castro fixation". In August 1963 McGovern advocated reducing the $53 billion defense budget by $5 billion; influenced by advisor Seymour Melman, he held a special antipathy toward the doctrine of nuclear overkill. McGovern would try to reduce defense appropriations or limit military expenditures in almost every year during the 1960s. He also voted against many weapons programs, especially missile and antimissile systems, and also opposed military assistance to foreign nations. In 1964 McGovern published his first book, War Against Want: America's Food for Peace Program. In it he argued for expanding his old program, and a Senate measure he introduced was eventually passed, adding $700 million to the effort's funding.

Preferring to concentrate on broad policy matters and speeches, McGovern was not a master of Senate legislative tactics, and he developed a reputation among some other senators for "not doing his homework". Described as "a very private, unchummy guy", he was not a member of the Senate "club" nor did he want to be, turning down in 1969 a chance to join the powerful United States Senate Committee on Rules and Administration. Relatively few pieces of legislation bore his name, and his legislative accomplishments were generally viewed as modest, although he would try to influence the contents of others' bills. In his political beliefs, McGovern fit squarely within modern American liberalism; through 1967 he had voted in accordance with the rated positions of the ADA 92 percent of the time, and when lacking specific knowledge on a particular matter, he would ask his staff, "What are the liberals doing?"

=== Opposition to Vietnam War ===
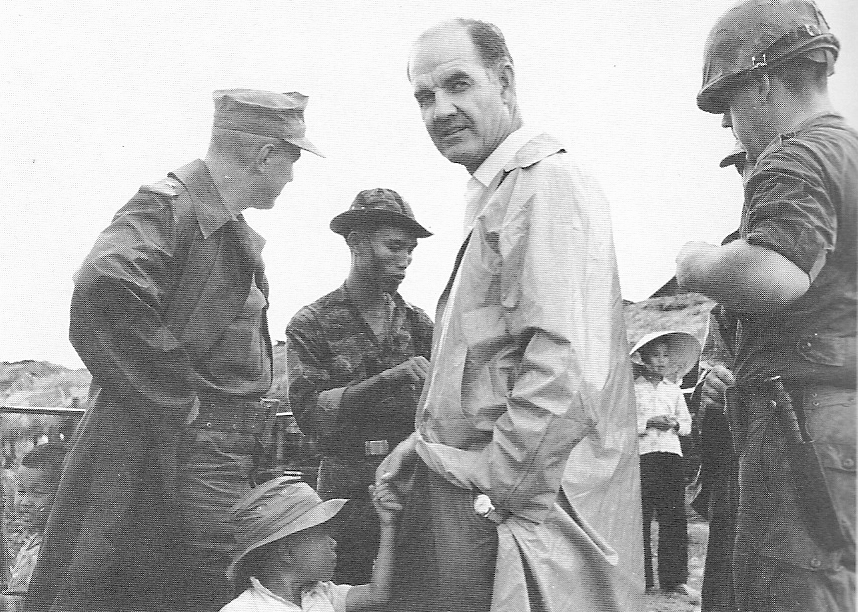
Senator McGovern on his first trip to South Vietnam, November 1965

In a speech on the Senate floor in September 1963, McGovern became the first member to challenge the growing national military for United States in the Vietnam War. Bothered by the Buddhist crisis and other recent developments, and with concerns influenced by Vietnam historian Bernard B. Fall, McGovern said:

The current dilemma in Vietnam is a clear demonstration of the limitations of military power ... [Current U.S. involvement] is a policy of moral debacle and political defeat ... The trap we have fallen into there will haunt us in every corner of this revolutionary world if we do not properly appraise its lessons.

As the speech was little noticed, McGovern backed away from saying anything publicly for over a year afterward, partly because of the November 1963 Assassination of John F. Kennedy and partly to not appear strident. Though more skeptical about it than most senators, McGovern voted in favor of the August 1964 Gulf of Tonkin Resolution, which turned out to be an essentially unbounded authorization for President Lyndon B. Johnson to escalate U.S. involvement in the war. McGovern thought the commander in chief should be given limited authority to retaliate against an attack; subsequently, he said his instinct had been to vote no, but that he had voted yes because of Senator J. William Fulbright's urging to stand behind Johnson politically. The day after the resolution vote, McGovern spoke concerning his fears that the vote would lead to greater involvement in the war; Wayne Morse, one of the only U.S. Senate members to oppose the resolution, sardonically noted that this fell into the category of "very interesting, but very belated." This would become the vote that McGovern most bitterly regretted.

In January 1965 McGovern made his first major address on Vietnam, saying that "We are not winning in South Vietnam ... I am very much opposed to the policy, now gaining support in Washington, of extending the war to the north." McGovern instead proposed a five-point plan advocating a negotiated settlement involving a federated Vietnam with local autonomy and a UN presence to guarantee security and fair treatment. The speech gave McGovern national visibility as one of the "doves" in the debate over Vietnam; however, McGovern made moderate-to-hawkish statements at times too, flatly rejecting unconditional withdrawal of U.S. forces and criticizing the Opposition to United States involvement in the Vietnam War draft-card burnings as "immature, impractical, and illegal". He eschewed personal criticism of Johnson. In November 1965 McGovern traveled to South Vietnam for three weeks. The human carnage he saw in hospital wards deeply upset him, and he became increasingly outspoken about the war upon his return, more convinced than ever that Vietnam was a political, not military, problem. Now he was ready, as he later said, "not merely to dissent, but to crusade" against the war.

McGovern voted in favor of Vietnam military appropriations in 1966 through 1968, not wanting to deprive U.S. forces of necessary equipment. Nevertheless, his antiwar rhetoric increased throughout 1967. Over the years, Johnson had invited McGovern and other Senate doves to the White House for attempts to explain the rationale for his actions in Vietnam; McGovern came away from the final such visit, in August 1967, shaken by the sight of a president "tortured and confused ... by the mess he has gotten into in Vietnam."

=== 1968 presidential and Senate campaigns ===
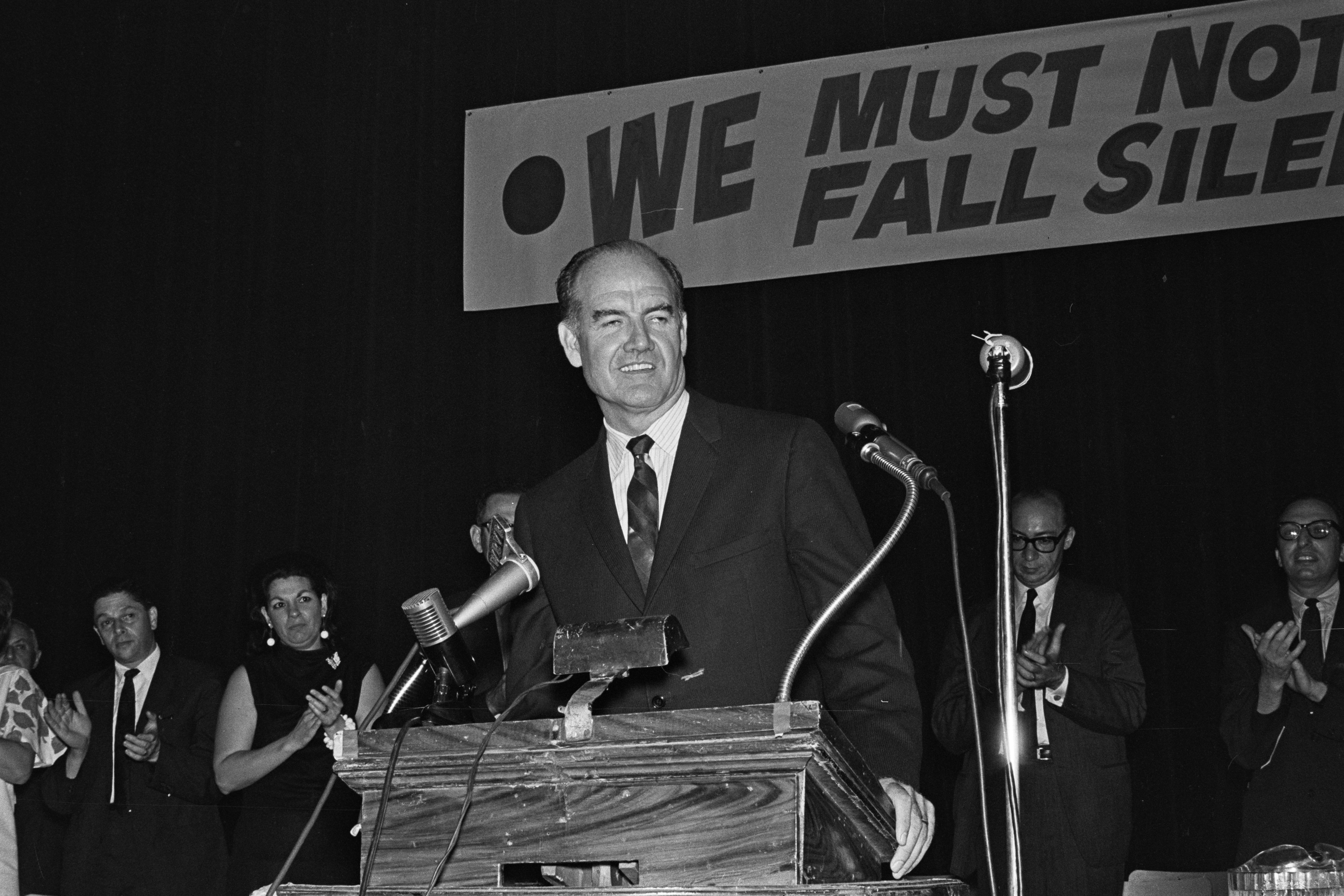
McGovern addresses a meeting at the Manhattan Center in New York City on Vietnam and Israel, June 15, 1967

In August 1967 activist Allard K. Lowenstein founded the Dump Johnson movement, and soon it was seeking a Democratic Party figure to make a primaries campaign challenge against Johnson in the 1968 U.S. presidential election. The group's first choice was Senator Robert Kennedy, who declined, as did another, and by late September 1967 they approached McGovern. After much deliberation McGovern declined, largely because he feared such a run would significantly damage his own chances for reelection to his Senate seat in 1968. A month later the anti-Johnson forces were able to persuade Senate member Eugene McCarthy to run; he was one of the few "dove" senators not up for reelection that year.

In the 1968 Democratic primary campaign, McCarthy staged a strong showing. Robert Kennedy entered the race, President Johnson withdrew and Vice President Hubert Humphrey joined the field. While McGovern privately favored Kennedy, McCarthy and Humphrey were both from the neighboring state of Minnesota and publicly McGovern remained neutral. McGovern hosted all three as they campaigned for the June 4 South Dakota Democratic primary, which resulted in a strong win by Kennedy to go along with his win in the crucial California primary that night. McGovern spoke with Kennedy by phone minutes before the latter’s assassination in Los Angeles. The death of Bobby Kennedy left McGovern the most emotionally distraught he had ever been to that point in his life.

Within days, some of Kennedy's aides were urging McGovern to run in his place; their antipathy toward McCarthy and ideological opposition to Humphrey made them unwilling to support either candidate. McGovern delayed making a decision, making sure that Bobby's brother Ted Kennedy did not want to enter, and with his staff still concerned about the senator's own reelection prospects. McGovern's voting had changed during 1968, with his ADA rating falling to 43 as he sought more middle-of-the-road stances. In late July, McGovern's decision became more complicated when his daughter Teresa was arrested in Rapid City, South Dakota on drug prohibition charges related to marijuana possession. She had led a troubled life since her teenage years, developing problems with alcohol and depression and suffering the consequences of a relationship with an unstable neighborhood boy. On the basis of a recently enacted strict state drugs law, Terry now faced a minimum five-year prison sentence if found guilty. McGovern was also convinced that the socially conservative voters of South Dakota would reject him owing to his daughter's arrest. Charges against her were subsequently dropped because of an invalid search warrant.

McGovern formally announced his candidacy on August 10, 1968, in Washington, two weeks in advance of the 1968 Democratic National Convention, committing himself to "the goals for which Robert Kennedy gave his life." Asked why he was a better choice than McCarthy, he said, "Well – Gene really doesn't want to be president, and I do." At the convention in Chicago, Humphrey was the near-certain choice, while McGovern became the initial rallying point for around 300 leaderless Kennedy delegates. The chaotic circumstances of the convention found McGovern denouncing the Chicago police tactics against demonstrators as "police brutality." Given the internal politics of the party, it was difficult for McGovern to gain in delegate strength, and black protest candidate Channing E. Phillips drew off some of his support. In the actual roll call, McGovern came in third with 146½ delegates, far behind Humphrey's 1760¼ and McCarthy's 601.

McGovern endorsed Humphrey at the convention, to the dismay of some antiwar figures who considered it a betrayal. Humphrey went on to lose the general election to Richard Nixon. McGovern returned to his Senate reelection race, facing Republican former governor Archie M. Gubbrud. While South Dakota voters sympathized with McGovern over his daughter's arrest, he initially suffered a substantial drop in popularity over the events in Chicago; however, McGovern conducted an energetic campaign that focused on his service to the state, while Gubbrud ran a lackluster effort. In November, McGovern won 57 percent of the vote in what he would consider the easiest and most decisive victory of his career.

=== Middle Senate years and continued opposition to the Vietnam War ===
During the 1968 Democratic Convention, a motion had been passed to establish a commission to reform the Democratic Party nomination process. In 1969 McGovern was named chairman of the Commission on Party Structure and Delegate Selection, also known as the McGovern–Fraser Commission; owing to the influence of former McCarthy and Kennedy supporters on the staff, the commission significantly reduced the role of party officials and insiders in the nomination process. The commission's 1970 report, Mandate for Reform, was approved by the Democratic National Committee in 1971. It required that delegates be selected either by a party primary where delegate preferences were indicated on the ballot or by a state convention process where the first stage was open caucuses. It also mandated quotas for proportional black, female, and youth delegate representation. The new rules had an immediate effect; in 1972, a third more primaries were held in the Democratic nomination process than in 1968 and those primaries produced half again as many delegates. Over the next few presidential election cycles, this trend towards holding primaries increased in both parties, with eventually over 80 percent of delegates being chosen via primaries; whereas before McGovern–Fraser, two-thirds of all delegates were chosen by state conventions controlled by party elites. Thus the U.S. presidential nominating process has been different ever since the McGovern–Fraser reforms, with scholars and politicians debating whether all the changes are for the better.

In the wake of several high-profile reports about hunger and malnutrition in the United States, the United States Senate Select Committee on Nutrition and Human Needs had been created in July 1968, with McGovern as its chairman. Seeking to dramatize the problem, in March 1969 McGovern took the committee to Immokalee, Florida, the base for 20,000 migrant farm workers. They saw graphic examples of hunger and malnutrition firsthand, but also encountered resistance and complaints about bad publicity from local and state officials. McGovern battled the Nixon administration and Southerners in Congress during much of the next year over an expanded Supplemental Nutrititon Assistance Program; he had to compromise on a number of points, but legislation signed in 1970 established the principles of free food stamps and a nationwide standard for eligibility.

McGovern generally lacked both interest and expertise in economics, but was outspoken in reaction to Nixon's imposition of incomes policy in 1971. McGovern declared: "This administration, which pledged to slow inflation and reduce unemployment, has instead given us the highest rate of inflation and the highest rate of unemployment in a decade." Regarding another heated domestic issue, 60 Minutes included McGovern in a 1971 report about liberal politicians and journalists who advocated integrated schooling while avoiding it for their children. (Note: The report, by Mike Wallace, detailed the senator's support of desegregation busing even while the Washington, D.C., resident was paying non-resident tuition for his own daughter to attend Bethesda, Maryland, public schools, which were only 3 percent black. McGovern responded that where he sent his children to school was a private matter.)

But most of all, McGovern was known for his continued opposition to the Vietnam War. In March 1969, he became the first senator to explicitly criticize the new president's policy there, an action that was seen as a breach of customary protocol by other Senate doves. The ongoing diversion to South Vietnam of much of Food for Peace's aid, where it was used to subsidize that country's budget, when there were countries around the world affected by drought and food shortages, upset him. By the end of 1969, McGovern was calling for an immediate cease-fire and a total withdrawal of all American troops within a year. In October 1969 McGovern was a featured speaker before 100,000 demonstrators in Boston at the Moratorium to End the War in Vietnam, and in November he spoke before 350,000 at Moratorium/Mobilization's antiwar march to the Washington Monument. Afterward, he decided that radicalized peace demonstrations were counterproductive and criticized antiwar figures such as Rennie Davis, Tom Hayden, Huey P. Newton, Abbie Hoffman, and Jerry Rubin as "reckless" and "irresponsible".

Instead, McGovern focused on legislative means to bring the war to an end. The McGovern–Hatfield Amendment to the annual military procurement bill, co-sponsored by Republican Mark Hatfield of Oregon, required via funding cutoff a complete withdrawal of all American forces from Indochina by the end of 1970. It underwent months of public discussion and alterations to make it acceptable to more senators, including pushing the deadline out to the end of 1971. In May 1970 McGovern obtained a second mortgage on his Washington home in order to fund a half-hour televised panel discussion on the amendment on NBC. The broadcast brought in over $500,000 in donations that furthered work on passage, and eventually the amendment gained the support of the majority of the public in polls. The effort was denounced by opposition groups organized by White House aide Charles Colson, which called McGovern and Hatfield "apostles of retreat and defeat" and "salesmen of surrender" and maintained that only the president could conduct foreign policy. The amendment was defeated in September 1970 by a 55–39 vote, just short of what McGovern had hoped would constitute at least a moral victory. During the floor debate, McGovern criticized his colleagues opposing the measure:

Every Senator in this chamber is partly responsible for sending 50,000 young Americans to an early grave. This chamber reeks of blood. Every Senator here is partly responsible for that human wreckage at Walter Reed and Bethesda Naval and all across our land – young men without legs, or arms, or genitals, or faces or hopes. There are not very many of these blasted and broken boys who think this war is a glorious adventure. Do not talk to them about bugging out, or national honor or courage. It does not take any courage at all for a congressman, or a senator, or a president to wrap himself in the flag and say we are staying in Vietnam, because it is not our blood that is being shed. But we are responsible for those young men and their lives and their hopes. And if we do not end this damnable war those young men will some day curse us for our pitiful willingness to let the Executive carry the burden that the Constitution places on us.

The Senate reacted in startled, stunned silence, and some faces showed anger and fury; when one member told McGovern he had been personally offended by the speech, McGovern said, "That's what I meant to do." McGovern believed Vietnam an immoral war that was destroying much of what was pure, hopeful, and different about America's character as a nation.

The defeat of the amendment left McGovern embittered and somewhat more radicalized. He accused the vice president of South Vietnam, Nguyễn Cao Kỳ, of running a heroin trafficking operation that was addicting American soldiers. In a retort to the powerful United States Senate Committee on Armed Services chairperson John C. Stennis's suggestion that U.S. troops might have to return to Cambodia, McGovern declared, "I'm tired of old men dreaming up wars for young men to fight. If he wants to use American ground troops in Cambodia, let him lead the charge himself." He denounced Nixon's policy of Vietnamization as "subsidiz[ing] the continued killing of the people of Indochina by technology and mercenaries." In a Playboy interview, he said that Ho Chi Minh was the North Vietnamese George Washington.

McGovern–Hatfield was put up for a vote again in 1971, with somewhat weaker provisions designed to gain more support. In polls, a large majority of the public now favored its intent, and McGovern took his name off a final form of it, as some senators were just objecting to him. Nevertheless, in June 1971, it failed to pass again, gaining only a few more votes than the year before. McGovern was now certain that the only way the war would come to a quick end was if there was a new president.

=== 1972 presidential campaign ===
McGovern announced his candidacy on January 18, 1971, during a televised speech from the studios of KELO-TV in Sioux Falls, South Dakota. At the time of his announcement, McGovern ranked fifth among Democrats in a presidential preference poll for Gallup, Inc.. The earliest such entry since Andrew Jackson, it was designed to give him time to overcome the large lead of the frontrunner, Maine senator Edmund Muskie. By January 1972, McGovern had only 3 percent national support among Democrats in the Gallup Poll and had not attracted significant press coverage. McGovern's campaign manager Gary Hart decided on a guerrilla-like insurgency strategy of battling Muskie in only selected primaries, not everywhere, so as to focus the campaign's organizational strength and resources.

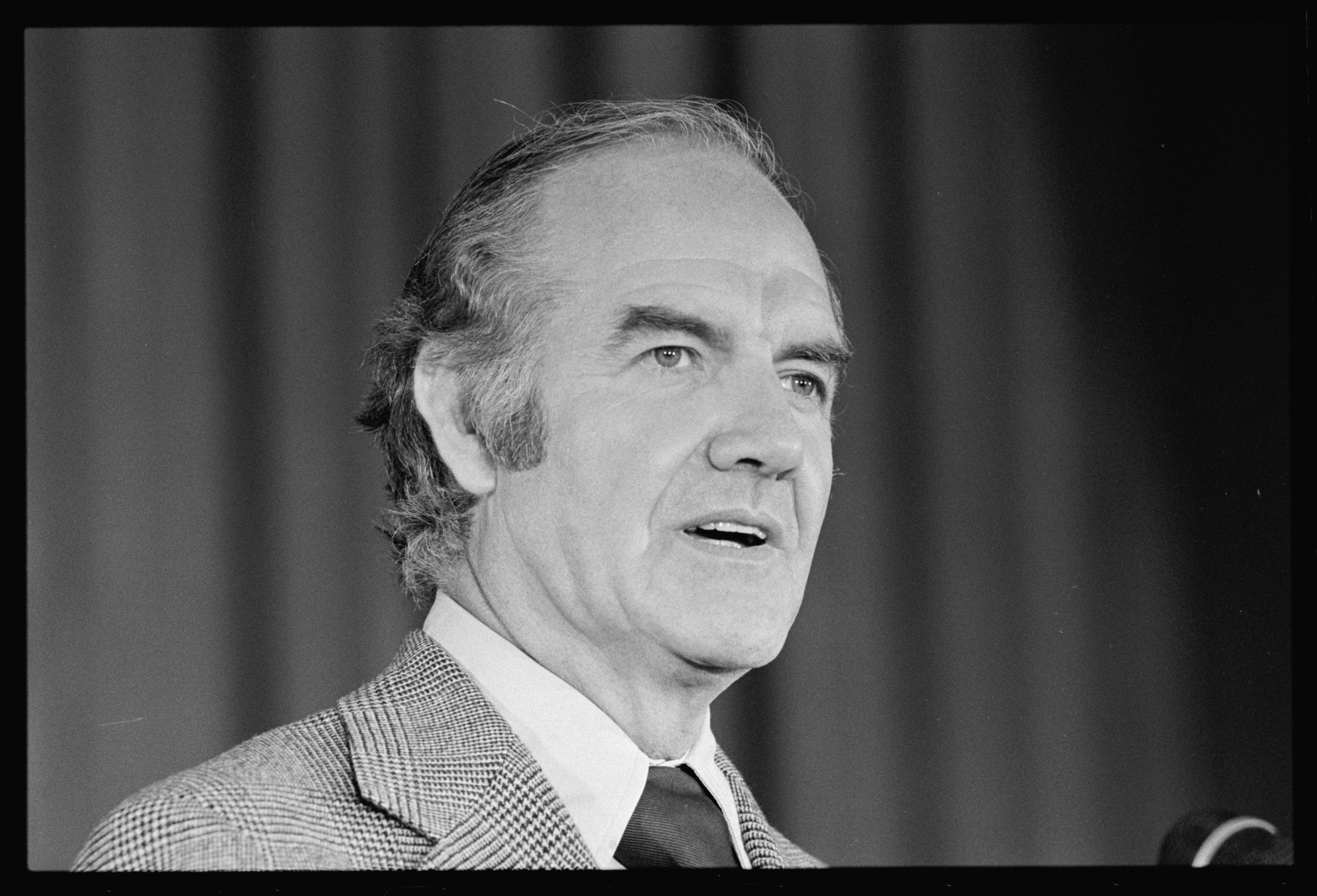
McGovern speaking on June 30, 1972

Muskie fell victim to inferior organizing, an over-reliance on party endorsements, and Nixon's "dirty tricks" operatives, and in the March 7, 1972, New Hampshire primary, did worse than expected with McGovern coming in a close second. As Muskie's campaign funding and support dried up, Hubert Humphrey, who had rejoined the Senate, became McGovern's primary rival for the nomination, with Alabama governor George Wallace also in the mix after dominating the March 14 primary in Florida. McGovern won a key breakthrough victory over Humphrey and Wallace on April 4 in Wisconsin, where he added blue-collar economic populism to his appeal. He followed that by dominating the April 25 primary in Massachusetts. At that point, McGovern had become the frontrunner. A late decision to enter the May 2 Ohio primary, considered a Humphrey stronghold, paid dividends when McGovern managed a very close second there amid charges of election fraud by pro-Humphrey forces. The other two leading candidates for the nomination also won primaries, but Wallace's campaign in effect ended when he was seriously wounded in a May assassination attempt, and McGovern's operation was effective in garnering delegates in caucus states.

The climactic contest took place in California, with Humphrey attacking McGovern in several televised debates; in the June 6 vote, McGovern defeated him by five percentage points and claimed all the delegates due to the state's winner-take-all rules. He then appeared to clinch the nomination with delegates won in the New York primary on June 20. Humphrey's attacks on McGovern as being too radical began a downward slide in the latter's poll standing against Nixon. McGovern became tagged with the label "amnesty, abortion, and acid", supposedly reflecting his positions. (Note: The label's origins later turned out to come from Thomas Eagleton, several months before he became the vice presidential nominee.) During his primary victories, McGovern used an approach that stressed grassroots-level organization while bypassing conventional campaign techniques and traditional party power centers. He capitalized on support from antiwar activists and reform liberals; thousands of students engaged in door-to-door campaigning for him. He benefited by the eight primaries he won being those the press focused on the most; he showed electoral weakness in the South and industrial Midwest, and actually received fewer primary votes overall than Humphrey and had only a modest edge over Wallace.

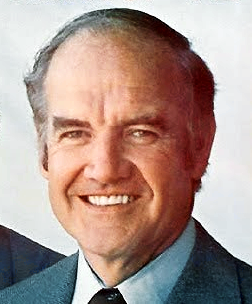
McGovern as seen in a 1972 campaign poster

McGovern ran on a political platform that advocated withdrawal from the Vietnam War in exchange for the return of American prisoners of war and amnesty for draft evaders who had left the country. McGovern's platform also included an across-the-board 37-percent reduction in defense spending over three years. He proposed a "demogrant" program that would give a $1,000 payment to every citizen in the United States. Based around existing ideas such as the negative income tax and intended to replace the welfare bureaucracy and complicated maze of existing public-assistance programs, it nonetheless garnered considerable derision as a poorly thought-out "liberal giveaway" and was dropped from the platform in August. (Note: The concept behind the demogrant was in part a conservative one, was similar to the negative income tax long advocated by economist Milton Friedman, and by the Nixon Administration in the form of the Family Assistance Program, which called for a minimum family grant of $1,600 per year, later raised to $2,400. McGovern had previously sponsored a bill, submitted by the National Welfare Rights Organization, for $6,500 guaranteed minimum income per year to families. But the demogrant differed from all these other plans by going to everyone and not being needs-based.)

An "Anybody But McGovern" coalition, led by southern Democrats and organized labor, formed in the weeks following the final primaries. McGovern's nomination did not become ensured until the first night of the 1972 Democratic National Convention in Miami Beach, Florida, where, following intricate parliamentary maneuverings led by campaign staffer Richard G. Stearns, a Humphrey credentials challenge regarding the California winner-take-all rules was defeated. Divisive arguments over the party platform then followed; what resulted was arguably the most liberal one of any major U.S. party. On July 12, 1972, McGovern officially won the Democratic nomination. In doing so and in taking over the party's processes and platform, McGovern produced what The New York Times termed "a stunning sweep." The convention distractions led to a hurried process to pick a vice presidential running mate. Turned down by his first choice, Ted Kennedy, as well as by several others, McGovern selected – with virtually no vetting – U.S. Senate member Thomas Eagleton from Missouri. On the final night of the convention, procedural arguments over matters such as a new party charter, and a prolonged vice presidential nomination process that descended into farce, delayed the nominee's acceptance speech. As a result, McGovern delivered his speech, "Come home America!", at three o'clock in the morning, reducing his television audience from about 70 million people to about 15 million.

Just over two weeks after the convention, it was revealed that Eagleton had been hospitalized and received electroconvulsive therapy for "nervous exhaustion" and "depression" several times during the early to mid-1960s. Years later, Eagleton's diagnosis was refined to bipolar II disorder. McGovern initially supported Eagleton, in part because he saw parallels with his daughter Terry's battles with mental illness. He was additionally sympathetic due to his wife Eleanor having experienced depression; and he was also harboring a secret about his own past, that being an undisclosed child. On the following day, July 26, McGovern stated publicly, "I am 1,000 percent for Tom Eagleton and have no intention of dropping him from the ticket." Though many people still supported Eagleton's candidacy, an increasing number of influential politicians and newspapers questioned his ability to handle the office of vice president and, potentially, president or questioned the McGovern campaign's ability to survive the distraction. The resulting negative attention – combined with McGovern's consultation with preeminent psychiatrists, including Karl Menninger, as well as doctors who had treated Eagleton – prompted McGovern to accept, and announce on August 1, Eagleton's offer to withdraw from the ticket. It remains the only time a major party vice presidential nominee has been forced off the ticket. Five prominent Democrats then publicly turned down McGovern's offer of the vice presidential slot: in sequence, Kennedy again, Abraham Ribicoff, Humphrey, Reubin Askew, and Muskie. (Larry O'Brien was also approached but no offer made). Finally, he named U.S. ambassador to France Sargent Shriver, a brother-in-law of John F. Kennedy. McGovern's 1,000 percent statement and subsequent reneging made him look both indecisive and an opportunist, and has since been considered one of the worst gaffes in presidential campaign history. McGovern himself would long view the Eagleton affair as having been "catastrophic" for his campaign.

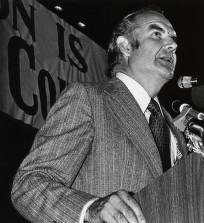
McGovern speaking at an October 1972 rally in Houston during the final weeks of the campaign

The general election campaign did not go well for McGovern. Nixon did little campaigning; he was buoyed by the success of his visit to China and arms-control-signing summit meeting in the Soviet Union earlier that year, and shortly before the election Henry Kissinger's somewhat premature statement that "peace is at hand" in Vietnam. Top Republican figures attacked McGovern for being weak on defense issues and "encouraging the enemy"; Nixon asserted that McGovern was for "peace at any price" in Vietnam rather than the "peace with honor" that Nixon said he would bring about. McGovern chose to not emphasize his own war record during the campaign. (Note: McGovern would later say of not emphasizing his war record more during the campaign: "I think it was a political error, but I always felt kind of foolish talking about my war record – what a hero I was. How do you do that? ... [I]t was not in my nature to turn the campaign into a constant exercise in self-congratulatory autobiography." Such disinclination was common among World War II veterans.) The McGovern Commission changes to the convention rules marginalized the influence of establishment Democratic Party figures, and McGovern struggled to get endorsements from figures such as former President Johnson and Chicago mayor Richard J. Daley. The AFL–CIO remained neutral, after having always endorsed the Democratic presidential candidate in the past. Some southern Democrats, led by former Governor of Texas John Connally, switched their support to the Republican incumbent through a campaign effort called Democrats for Nixon. Nixon outspent McGovern by more than two-to-one.

Nixon directly requested that his aides use government records to try to dig up dirt on McGovern and his top contributors. McGovern was publicly attacked by Nixon surrogates and was the target of various operations of the Nixon "dirty tricks" campaign. The infamous Watergate break-in of the Democratic National Committee headquarters in June 1972 was an alternate target after bugging McGovern's headquarters was explored. The full dimensions of the subsequent Watergate scandal did not emerge during the election; the vast majority of the press focused on McGovern's difficulties and other news rather than the break-in or who was behind it, and a majority of voters were unaware of Watergate. In the end, Nixon's covert operations had little effect in either direction on the election outcome.

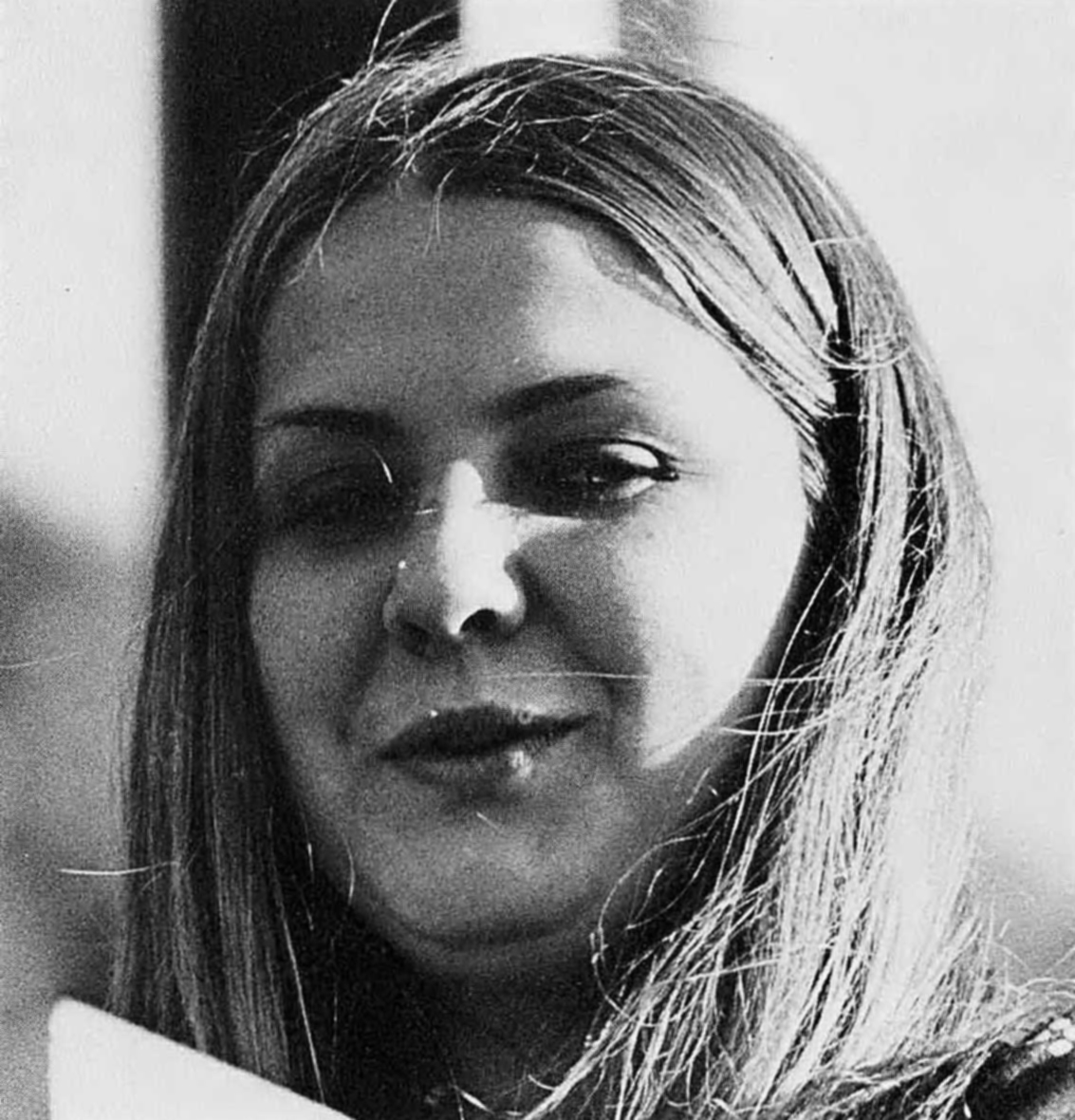
McGovern's daughter Teresa speaks at the University of California, Santa Barbara, November 1, 1972

By the final week of the campaign, McGovern knew he was going to lose. While he was appearing in Battle Creek, Michigan, on November 2, a Nixon admirer heckled him. McGovern told the heckler, "I've got a secret for you", then said softly into his ear, "Kiss my ass." The incident was overheard and reported in the press, and became part of the tale of the campaign. (Note: By McGovern's later telling, "KMA" buttons were being worn by people in the crowds at McGovern rallies by the following night. Some observers felt it showed a forcefulness that his campaign had theretofore lacked. Several years later, McGovern observed Mississippi Senator James Eastland, not a big supporter of his, looking at him from across the Senate floor and chuckling to himself. He subsequently approached McGovern and asked, "Did you really tell that guy in '72 to kiss your ass?" When McGovern smiled and nodded, Eastland replied, "That was the best line in the campaign.")

County-by-county results of the election, shaded by percentage won: Nixon in red, McGovern in blue

In the general election on November 7, 1972, the McGovern–Shriver ticket suffered a 61 percent to 37 percent defeat to Nixon – at the time, the second biggest landslide in American history, with a United States Electoral College total of 520 to 17. McGovern's two electoral vote victories came in Massachusetts and the District of Columbia, and he failed to win his home state of South Dakota, which had gone Democratic in only three of the previous eighteen presidential elections and would continue to go Republican in presidential elections to come. Over the nation as a whole he carried a mere 135 counties. (Note: Overall McGovern carried 130 counties in the contiguous U.S., the District of Columbia, and four county-equivalents in Alaska.) At just over four percent of the nation's counties, McGovern's county wins remain the fewest by almost a factor of three for any major-party nominee.

=== Remaining Senate years ===
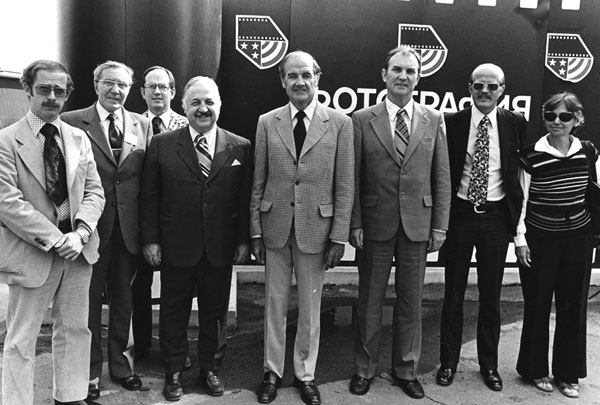
Senator McGovern visiting an American photography exhibition in Tbilisi in the Soviet Union in 1977

After this loss, McGovern remained in the Senate. He was scarred by the enormous defeat, and his wife, Eleanor, took it even worse; during the winter of 1972–1973, the couple seriously considered moving to England. His allies were replaced in positions of power within the Democratic Party leadership, and the McGoverns did not get publicly introduced at party affairs they attended. On January 20, 1973, a few hours after Richard Nixon was re-inaugurated, McGovern gave a speech at the Oxford Union that talked about the abuses of Nixon's presidency; it brought criticism, including from some Democrats, for being ill-mannered.

To get past the "bitterness and self-pity" he felt, McGovern forced himself to deal with the defeat humorously before audiences; starting at the March 1973 Gridiron Club, he frequently related his campaign misadventures in a self-deprecating fashion, such as saying, "For many years, I wanted to run for the presidency in the worst possible way – and last year I sure did." Emotions surrounding the loss would remain with McGovern for decades, as it did with some other defeated presidential nominees. Nixon resigned in August 1974 because of the Watergate scandal. McGovern said President Gerald Ford's subsequent September 1974 pardon of Nixon was difficult to understand, given that Nixon's subordinates were going to prison.

McGovern displayed the political resiliency he had shown in the past. In 1974, he faced possible political peril because of his having neglected the state during his long presidential campaign, and by May 1973, he had already begun campaigning for re-election. An Air Force pilot and Medal of Honor recipient, Leo K. Thorsness, had just been repatriated after six years as a prisoner of war in North Vietnam; he publicly accused McGovern of having given aid and comfort to the enemy and of having prolonged his time as a POW. McGovern replied that if there had been no war, there would have been no POWs, and that everything he had done had been toward the goal of ending the war sooner. Thorsness became the Republican nominee against McGovern, but despite the two men's different roles in it, the war did not become a significant issue. Instead, the campaign was dominated by farm policy differences and economic concerns over the 1973–1975 recession. Thorsness charged McGovern with being a "part-time senator" more concerned with national office and with spending over $2 million on his re‑election bid, while McGovern labeled Thorsness a carpetbagger owing to his having grown up in Minnesota. In a year in which Democrats were advantaged by the aftereffects of the Watergate scandal, McGovern won re-election in November 1974 with 53 percent of the vote.

Following the Fall of Saigon and the end of the Vietnam War in April 1975, McGovern attributed the outcome not to Congressional refusal to fund more military aid to South Vietnam, as President Ford had wanted. Instead, McGovern said, the regime of Nguyễn Văn Thiệu "fell because the leadership was corrupt and decadent and did not have the support of its own people." Regarding the Indochina refugee crisis that soon developed, McGovern introduced legislation in early May 1975 to enable Vietnamese refugees who had left the country in panic fearing a post-war bloodbath to return to the country. He said, "Ninety percent of the refugees would be better off going back to their own land. And I say that in a humanitarian spirit. ... The [new] Saigon government has already given orders that the people are not to be molested ... that is more respect than Thieu's army frequently demonstrated. ... our program for dealing with these refugees should include as the highest priority steps to facilitate their early return to Vietnam." McGovern's stance brought immediate criticism from some quarters; syndicated columnist John Lofton said it proved that McGovern was "the most immoral hypocrite on the American political scene today." McGovern objected to what he termed distorted interpretations of his proposal, but newspaper publisher Creed Black considered the criticism fair.

Following his Senate re-election victory, McGovern harbored thoughts of running in the 1976 United States presidential election. Given the magnitude of his defeat in 1972, very few in the Democratic Party wanted him as a presidential candidate again. Unfamiliar and uncomfortable with Democratic nominee Jimmy Carter, McGovern secretly voted for Ford instead. (Note: McGovern did not publicly reveal his vote for the Republican Ford until 2007, after the former president's death, and said that without his knowledge his family had done the same thing. He later voted for Carter in the 1980 presidential election.) McGovern's view on intervention in Southeast Asia took a turn in 1978 in reaction to the ongoing Cambodian genocide. Noting that it affected a percentage of the population that made "Hitler's operation look tame", he advocated an international military intervention in Cambodia to put the Khmer Rouge regime out of power.

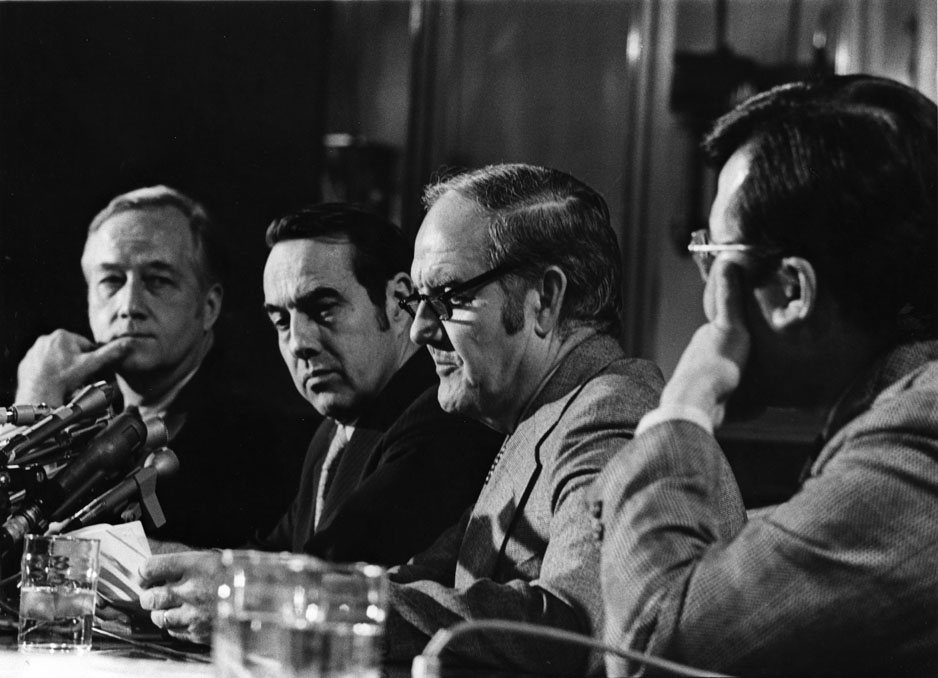
McGovern with Bob Dole (second from left) and other senators

McGovern's Select Committee on Nutrition and Human Needs expanded its scope to include national nutrition policy. In 1977, it issued a new set of nutritional guidelines for Americans that sought to combat leading killer health conditions. Titled Dietary Goals for the United States, but also known as the "McGovern Report", it suggested that Americans eat less fat, less cholesterol, less refined and processed sugars, and more complex carbohydrates and fiber. While many public health officials had said all of this for some time, the committee's issuance of the guidelines gave it higher public profile. The recommendations proved controversial with the cattle, dairy, egg, and sugar industries, including from McGovern's home state. The McGovern committee guidelines led to reorganization of some federal executive functions and became the predecessor to the more detailed Dietary Guidelines for Americans later issued twice a decade by the Center for Nutrition Policy and Promotion.

In 1980, McGovern was one of several liberal Democratic senators targeted for defeat by the National Conservative Political Action Committee (NCPAC), which put out a year's worth of negative advertising about McGovern. It and other anti-abortion groups especially focused on McGovern's support for abortion rights laws. McGovern faced a Democratic primary challenge for the first time, from a pro-life candidate. McGovern's Republican opponent was James Abdnor, a four-term incumbent congressman who held identical positions to McGovern's on farm issues, was solidly conservative on national issues, and was well liked within the state. Abdnor's campaign focused on both McGovern's liberal voting record and what it said was McGovern's lack of involvement in South Dakota affairs. McGovern made an issue of NCPAC's outside involvement, and that group eventually withdrew from the campaign after Abdnor denounced a letter it had sent out. Far behind in the polls earlier, McGovern outspent Abdnor two-to-one and repeatedly criticized Abdnor's refusal to debate him, thereby drawing attention to a slight speech defect Abdnor had. Showing the comeback pattern of some of his past races in the state, McGovern closed the gap for a while. In November 1980, McGovern was defeated for re-election, winning only 39 percent of the vote to Abdnor's 58 percent. In what became known as the "Reagan Revolution", McGovern was one of many Democratic casualties of that year's Republican sweep.

== Post-Senate life and 1984 presidential campaign ==
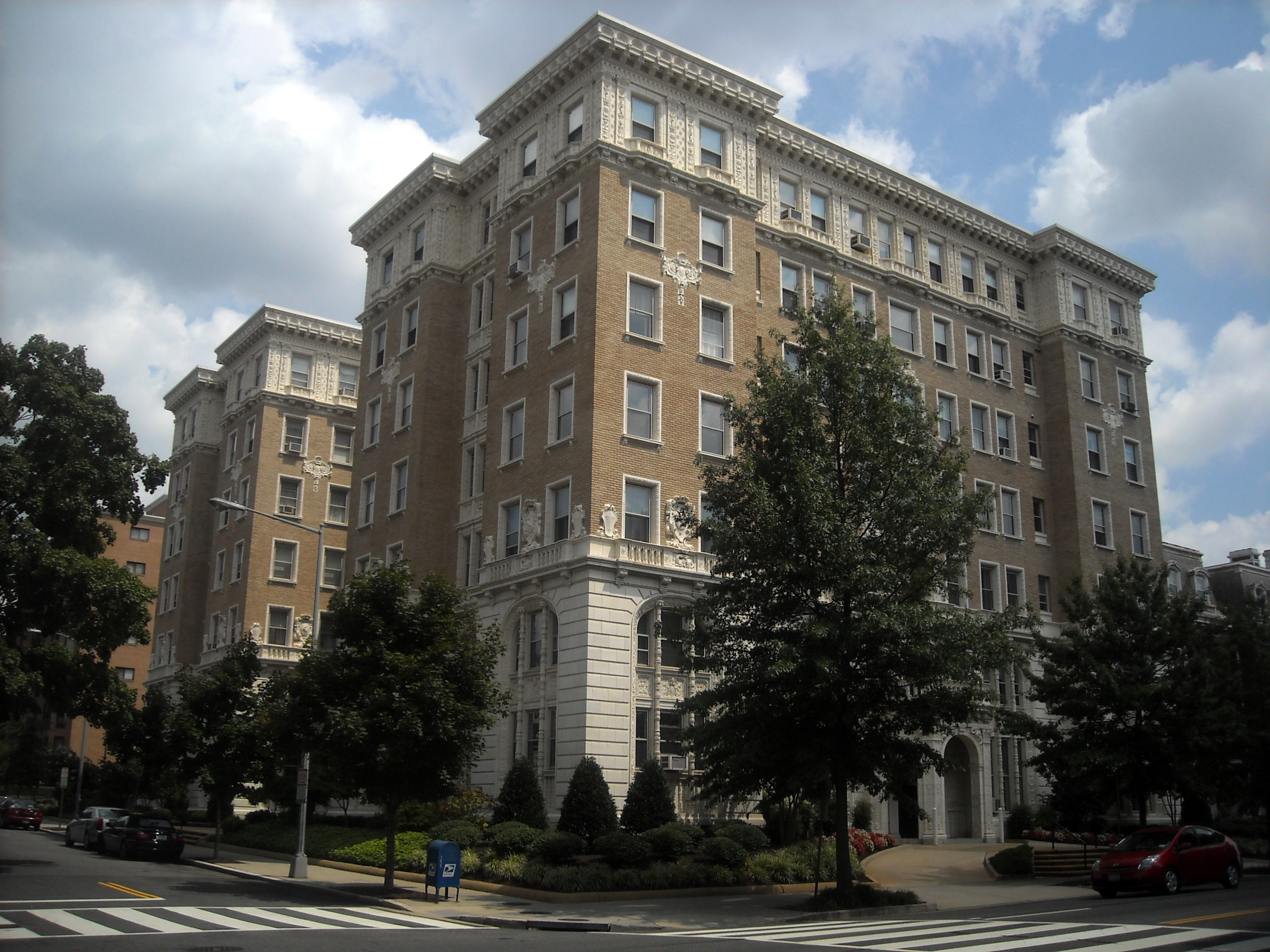
During the 1980s, McGovern lived in the historic Bates Warren Apartment House, a Beaux-Arts architecture-style building on Connecticut Avenue in Washington, D.C.

McGovern did not mourn leaving the Senate. Although being rejected by his own state stung, intellectually he could accept that South Dakotans wanted a more conservative representative; he and Eleanor felt out of touch with the country and in some ways liberated by the loss. Nevertheless, he refused to believe that Liberalism in the United States was dead in the time of Reagan; remaining active in politics, in January 1981 he founded the political organization Americans for Common Sense. The group sought to rally liberals, encourage liberal thinking, and combat the Moral Majority and other new Christian right forces. In 1982 he turned the group into a political action committee, which raised $1.2 million for liberal candidates in the 1982 U.S. congressional elections. McGovern shut the committee down when he decided to run again for president.

McGovern also began teaching and lecturing at a number of universities in the U.S. and Europe, accepting one-year contracts or less. From 1981 to 1982, McGovern replaced historian Stephen E. Ambrose as a professor at the University of New Orleans. McGovern also began making frequent speeches, earning several hundred thousand dollars a year. McGovern attempted another presidential run in the 1984 Democratic primaries. Friends and political admirers of McGovern initially feared the effort would prove an embarrassment, and McGovern knew that his chances of winning were remote, but he felt compelled to try to influence the intraparty debate in a liberal direction. Freed from the practical concerns of trying to win, McGovern outlined a ten-point program of sweeping domestic and foreign policy changes; because he was not seen as a threat, fellow competitors did not attack his positions, and media commentators praised him as the "conscience" of the Democratic Party. McGovern's unique positions among the field included criticism of Israel's policy, as although he supported Israel's right to exist, he believed the creation of an independent Palestinian state was necessary for lasting peace in the region.

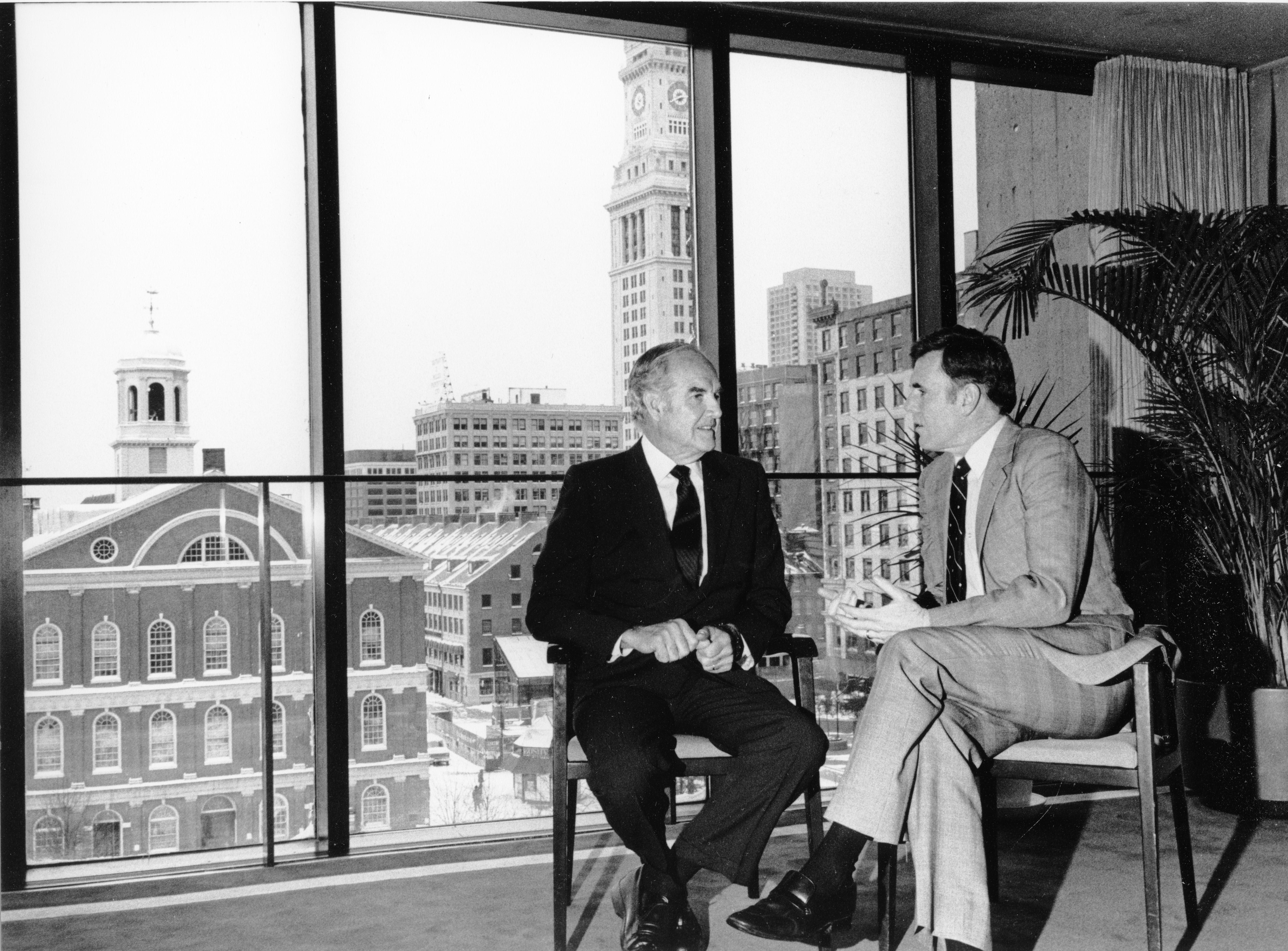
McGovern talking with the Mayor of Boston, Raymond Flynn, in the mid-1980s

Despite enjoying good name recognition, McGovern had little funding or staff, although he did garner critical funding from some celebrities and statesmen. He won a surprise third-place showing in the Iowa caucuses amidst a crowded field of candidates but finished fifth in the New Hampshire primary. He announced he would drop out unless he finished first or second in the Massachusetts primary, and when he came in third behind his former campaign manager Gary Hart and former vice president Walter Mondale, he kept his word. He later endorsed Mondale, the eventual Democratic nominee. He hosted the 17th episode of Saturday Night Live Season 9 on April 14, 1984. McGovern addressed the party's platform committee, and his name was placed in nomination at the 1984 Democratic National Convention, where he delivered a speech that strongly criticized President Reagan and praised Democratic unity. He received the votes of four delegates. He actively supported the Mondale–Geraldine Ferraro ticket, whose eventual landslide defeat bore some similarities to his own in 1972.

During the 1980s McGovern was a fellow at the Institute for Policy Studies, a think tank in Washington, D.C. In September 1987, McGovern lectured at the inaugural Waldo Family Lecture Series on International Relations at Old Dominion University in Norfolk, Virginia. In January 1988, McGovern said that he was considering entering the 1988 Democratic Party presidential primaries in the event that a front-runner did not emerge in the race. Ultimately, he did not enter. McGovern had made several real estate investments in the D.C. area and became interested in hotel operations. In 1988, using the money he had earned from his speeches, the McGoverns bought, renovated, and began running a 150-room inn in Stratford, Connecticut, with the goal of providing a hotel, restaurant, and public conference facility. It went into bankruptcy in 1990 and closed the following year. In 1992 McGovern published his reflections on the experience in The Wall Street Journal and the Nation's Restaurant News. He attributed part of the failure to the early 1990s recession, but also part to the cost of dealing with federal, state, and local regulations that were passed with good intentions but made life difficult for small businesses, and to the cost of dealing with frivolous lawsuits. McGovern wrote, "I ... wish that during the years I was in public office I had had this firsthand experience about the difficulties business people face every day. That knowledge would have made me a better U.S. senator and a more understanding presidential contender." His statement would still be resonating with American conservatives two decades later.

Although he briefly explored another presidential run in the 1992 contest, (Note: During early 1991, McGovern publicly explored a run for the 1992 Democratic presidential nomination, as President George H. W. Bush's popularity following the Gulf War was leading potential Democratic candidates to shy away from running. McGovern's campaign would not have been centered on the war, which McGovern ultimately spoke in favor of, although he would have preferred economic sanctions against Iraq. But in May 1991, McGovern announced he would not run, saying it was time for a younger, less battle-scarred candidate to carry the liberal banner.) McGovern instead became president of the Middle East Policy Council (a nonprofit organization that seeks to educate American citizens and policymakers about the political, economic and security issues impacting U.S. national interests in the Middle East) in July 1991; he had previously served on its board since 1986. He held this position until 1997, when he was replaced by Chas W. Freeman Jr. On the night of December 12–13, 1994, McGovern's daughter Teresa fell into a snowbank in Madison, Wisconsin, while heavily intoxicated and died of hypothermia. Heavy press attention followed, and McGovern revealed his daughter had battled her alcoholism for years and had been in and out of many treatment programs while having had one extended period of sobriety. McGovern authored an account of her life, Terry: My Daughter's Life-and-Death Struggle with Alcoholism; published in 1996, it presented a harrowing, unsparing view of the depths to which she had descended, the torment that he and the rest of his family had experienced in trying unsuccessfully to help her, and his ongoing thoughts and guilt about whether the demands of his political career and the time he had spent away from the family had made things worse for her. The book was a modest best-seller, and with the proceeds, he founded the Teresa McGovern Center in Madison to help others suffering from the combination of alcoholism and mental health problems. He would later say that Terry's death was by far the most painful event in his life: "You never get over it, I'm sure of that. You get so you can live with it, that's all."

== Ambassador to food agencies and other later activities ==
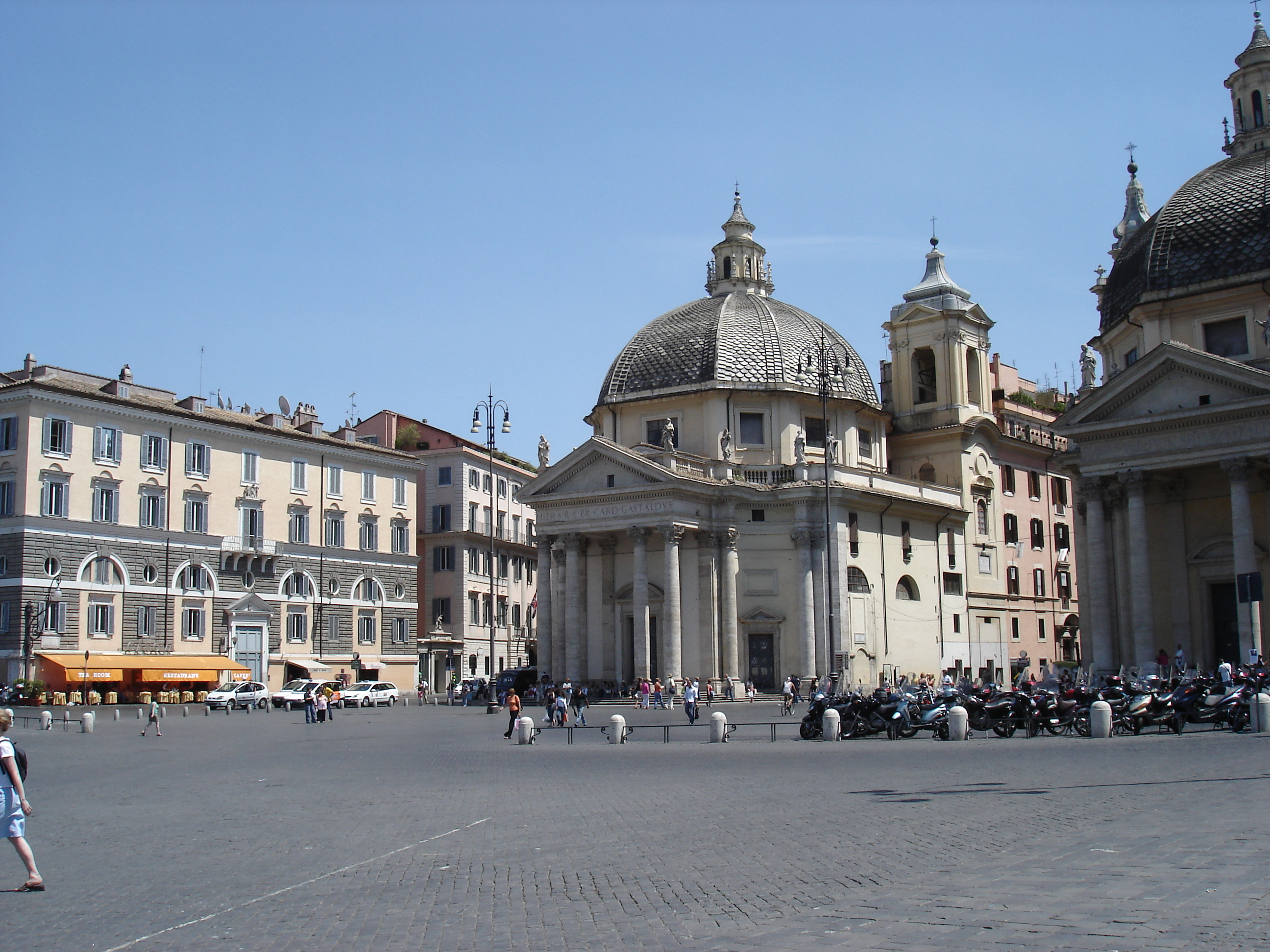
At the time McGovern was ambassador, the U.S. Mission to the UN Agencies in Rome was housed in Piazza del Popolo, 18 (here seen as the building on the far left).

In April 1998 McGovern returned to public service when he began a three-year stint as United States ambassador to the United Nations Agencies for Food and Agriculture, serving in Rome, after having been named to the post by President Bill Clinton. The announcement that Clinton was choosing McGovern for the role had come on February 19, McGovern's appointment had been confirmed by voice vote of the Senate on March 6, had become official on March 10, and he presented his credentials to the UN in Rome on April 14. The 75-year-old McGovern said he had not been seeking the position, but that "it's ideal for someone my age because it carries full ambassadorial rank without the hassle of running a big embassy."

In an effort to meet the UN's goal of reducing the number of hungry people in the world by half by 2015, Ambassador McGovern formulated detailed plans, urging delivery of more surplus food to foreign school-lunch programs and the establishment of specific targets such as had been done in old American programs. He began working again with fellow former U.S. Senate member Bob Dole from Kansas to persuade the Senate to support this effort, as well as expanded school lunch, food stamps, and nutritional help for pregnant women and poor children in the United States.

The McGovern–Dole International Food for Education and Child Nutrition Program that was created in 2000, and funded largely through the Congress, would go on to provide more than 22 million meals to children in 41 countries over the next eight years. (Note: The internationally popular McGovern-Dole International Food for Education and Child Nutrition Program was known as the Global Food for Education Initiative until 2002, when it was incorporated into the 2002 Farm Bill under its present name. It was initially funded with $300 million in 2000 and then generally at $100 million a year. There were attempts to give it more permanent funding levels during 2007 and 2008. and it received an additional $80 million in 2009. By 2011–2012, the funding level was around $200 million per year.) It was also credited with improving school attendance, especially among girls, who were more likely to be allowed to go to school if a meal was being provided. In August 2000, President Clinton presented McGovern with the Presidential Medal of Freedom, the nation's highest civilian honor, in recognition of McGovern's service in the effort to eradicate world hunger. McGovern's book The Third Freedom: Ending Hunger in Our Time was published in January 2001; with its title making reference to Roosevelt's Four Freedoms speech, it proposed a plan whereby chronic world hunger could be eliminated within thirty years. In January 2001, McGovern was asked to stay on at the UN post for a while by the incoming George W. Bush administration. His stint then concluded with a termination of mission on September 28, 2001.

In October 2001, McGovern was appointed as the first UN global ambassador on world hunger by the World Food Programme, the agency he had helped found forty years earlier. He was still active in this goodwill ambassador position as of 2011 and remained in it until his death. McGovern was an honorary life member of the board of Friends of the World Food Program. McGovern also served as a senior policy advisor at Olsson Frank Weeda, a food and drug regulatory counseling law and lobbying firm in Washington, D.C., where he specialized on issues of food, nutrition, and agriculture. McGovern's wartime story was at the center of Ambrose's 2001 best-selling profile of the men who flew B‑24s over Germany in World War II, The Wild Blue. It was the first time much of the public became familiar with that part of his life; throughout his political career, McGovern had rarely mentioned his war service or the medals he had won.

External videos
- "Legacy of George McGovern" "Participants talked about the legacy of George McGovern, especially relating to his fight against world hunger and malnutrition. The celebration included toasts, remembrances, and a video presentation." July 14, 2007, C-SPAN

McGovern continued to lecture and make public appearances, sometimes appearing with Dole on college campuses. McGovern and Dole contributed essays to the 2005 volume Ending Hunger Now: A Challenge to Persons of Faith. From around 2003 to 2005, McGovern owned a bookstore in his summer home of Stevensville in Montana's Bitterroot Valley, until deciding to sell it because of lack of sufficient market. In 2003, the McGoverns became part-time residents of Marco Island, Florida; by then, Eleanor was struggling with heart disease.

In October 2006, the $8.5 million George and Eleanor McGovern Library and Center for Leadership and Public Service was dedicated at Dakota Wesleyan University. The couple had helped raise the funds for it. It seeks to prepare the college's best students for future careers in public service through classes, seminars, research, and internships, and also to raise the visibility of the university. The dignitaries in attendance were led by former president Clinton. McGovern's wife Eleanor was too ill to attend the ceremony, and she died of heart disease on January 25, 2007, at their home in Mitchell. Later in 2007, several events were held at Dakota Wesleyan and in Washington, D.C., to celebrate McGovern's 85th birthday and the 35th anniversary of his nomination for president. Hundreds of former staff, volunteers, supporters and friends attended, along with public officials.

McGovern still sought to have his voice heard in the American political scene. He became an outspoken opponent of the Iraq War, likening U.S. involvement in that country to that of the failed Vietnam effort, and in 2006 co-wrote the book Out of Iraq: A Practical Plan for Withdrawal Now. In January 2004, McGovern campaigned for Wesley Clark in his presidential bid, citing him as the candidate best suited to win in the general election. In January 2008, McGovern wrote an op-ed in The Washington Post calling for the impeachment of President George W. Bush and Vice-President Dick Cheney, saying they had violated the U.S. Constitution, transgressed national and international law, and repeatedly lied to the American people. The subtitle of the article read "Nixon Was Bad. These Guys Are Worse." In the tumultuous 2008 Democratic Party presidential nomination campaign, he first endorsed U.S. Senate member Hillary Clinton from New York and then later switched to U.S. Senate member Barack Obama from Illinois after concluding Clinton could no longer win. (Note: In October 2007, McGovern endorsed Senator Hillary Clinton for the 2008 Democratic Party presidential nomination. But in early May 2008, McGovern switched his endorsement to Senator Barack Obama, on the grounds that Clinton could no longer win. He then published an op-ed article for The New York Times that said that Clinton's persistence in the campaign was perfectly allowable, but that the two candidates should discontinue criticizing each other and instead focus on presumptive Republican nominee John McCain, lest a repetition of his own experiences with a split party in 1972 occur.) On October 16, 2008, McGovern and Dole were made World Food Prize laureates for their efforts to curb hunger in the world and in particular for their joint program for school feeding and enhanced school attendance.

== Final years and death ==
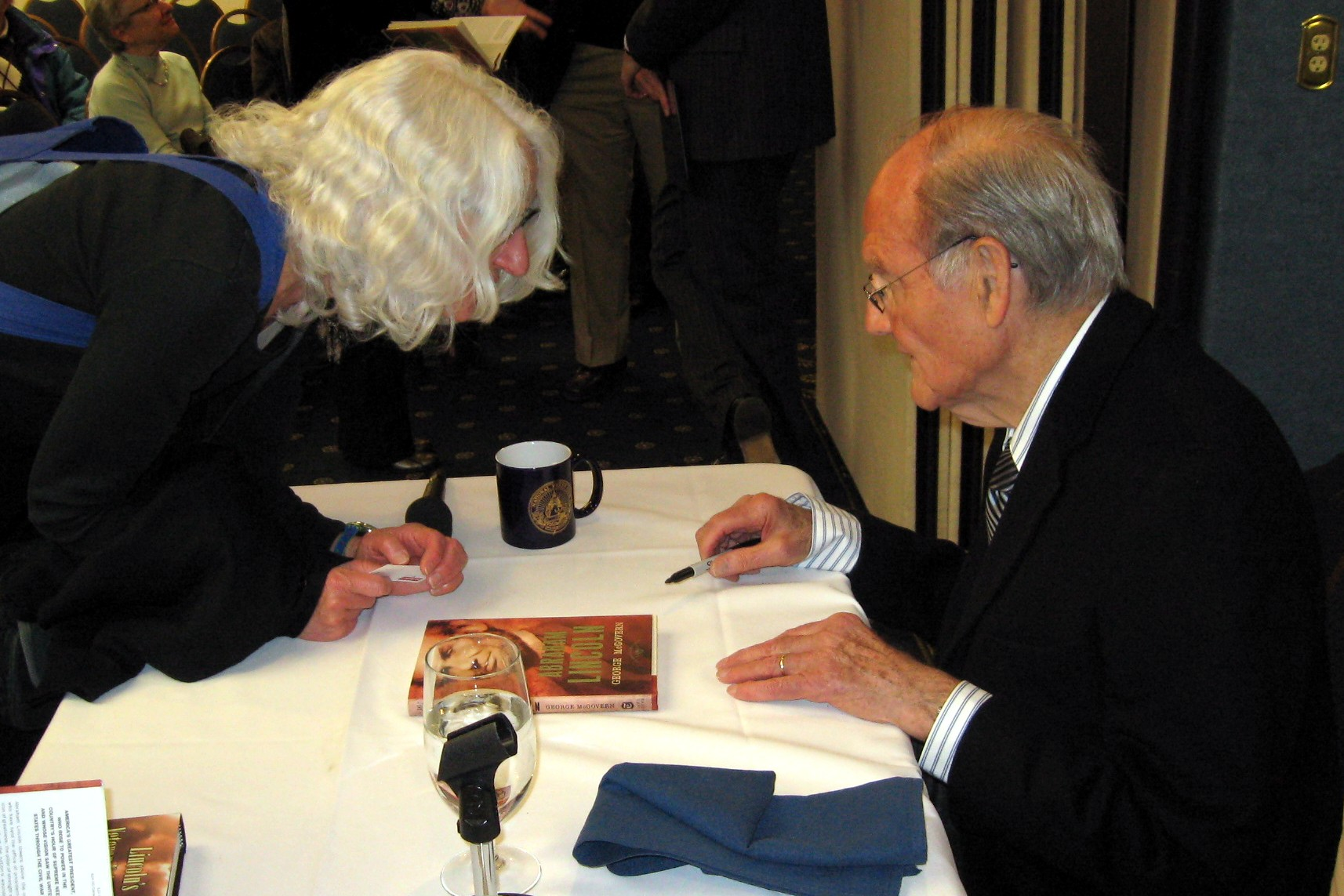
McGovern signing books at the National Press Club, 2009

By 2009, McGovern had moved to St. Augustine Beach, Florida. McGovern's seventh book (as author, co-author, or contributing editor) issued in the first decade of the 2000s, Abraham Lincoln, was published by Times Books and released at the close of 2008. Throughout 2009, McGovern embarked on a book tour, including a prominent visit to the Richard Nixon Presidential Library and Museum.

He was treated for exhaustion during 2011 and then was hospitalized after a serious fall in December 2011 on his way to participate in a live C-SPAN program about his 1972 presidential campaign on the 2011 television show The Contenders. By January 2012 he was promoting his latest book, What It Means to Be a Democrat. He was hospitalized again in April 2012 owing to fainting spells. McGovern's 90th birthday was celebrated on July 19, 2012, with a Washington event hosted by World Food Programme and attended by many liberal Democratic politicians, along with (as The Washington Post termed it) "one respectful conservative", Republican Party U.S. Senate member John Thune. On July 27, 2012, McGovern's son Steven died at age 60. McGovern's daughter Ann said, "Steve had a long struggle with alcoholism. We will all miss him deeply, but are grateful that he is now at peace." In August 2012, McGovern moved back to Sioux Falls, South Dakota, to be nearer to his family. His final public appearance was on October 6, 2012, when he introduced his recorded narration for Aaron Copland's "Lincoln Portrait" with the South Dakota Symphony Orchestra.

On October 15, 2012, McGovern's family announced he had entered Dougherty Hospice House in Sioux Falls; his daughter Ann said, "He's coming to the end of his life." On the morning of October 21, 2012, McGovern died at the age of 90 at the Sioux Falls hospice, surrounded by family and lifelong friends. The family released this statement: "We are blessed to know that our father lived a long, successful and productive life advocating for the hungry, being a progressive voice for millions and fighting for peace. He continued giving speeches, writing and advising all the way up to and past his 90th birthday, which he celebrated this summer." In addition to his three remaining children, he was survived by ten grandchildren and eight great-grandchildren.

President Obama paid tribute to McGovern as "a champion for peace" and a "statesman of great conscience and conviction". At a memorial service in Sioux Falls, Vice President Joe Biden eulogized McGovern, addressing his World War II service and his opposition to the Vietnam War by saying to his family, "Your father was a genuine hero. ... Had your father not been in the Senate, so much more blood, so much more treasure would have been wasted." His funeral was held in the Washington Pavilion of Arts and Science in Sioux Falls, with his ashes to be buried alongside his wife and daughter Terry at Rock Creek Cemetery in Washington.

On July 26, 2015, the Argus Leader, the daily newspaper in Sioux Falls, published an article detailing the extensive files on McGovern compiled through the years by the Federal Bureau of Investigation, including letters and notations from FBI director J. Edgar Hoover, revealing that Hoover had a direct interest in the FBI monitoring of McGovern. The newspaper also published the complete FBI file on McGovern that was obtained through a Freedom of Information Act request filed shortly after McGovern's death.

== Awards and decorations ==
McGovern's decorations include:

Army Air Forces Pilot Badge
Distinguished Flying Cross	Air Medal with 3 bronze oak leaf clusters	Presidential Medal of Freedom
American Campaign Medal	European–African–Middle Eastern Campaign Medal with 4 bronze campaign stars	World War II Victory Medal

== Legacy ==
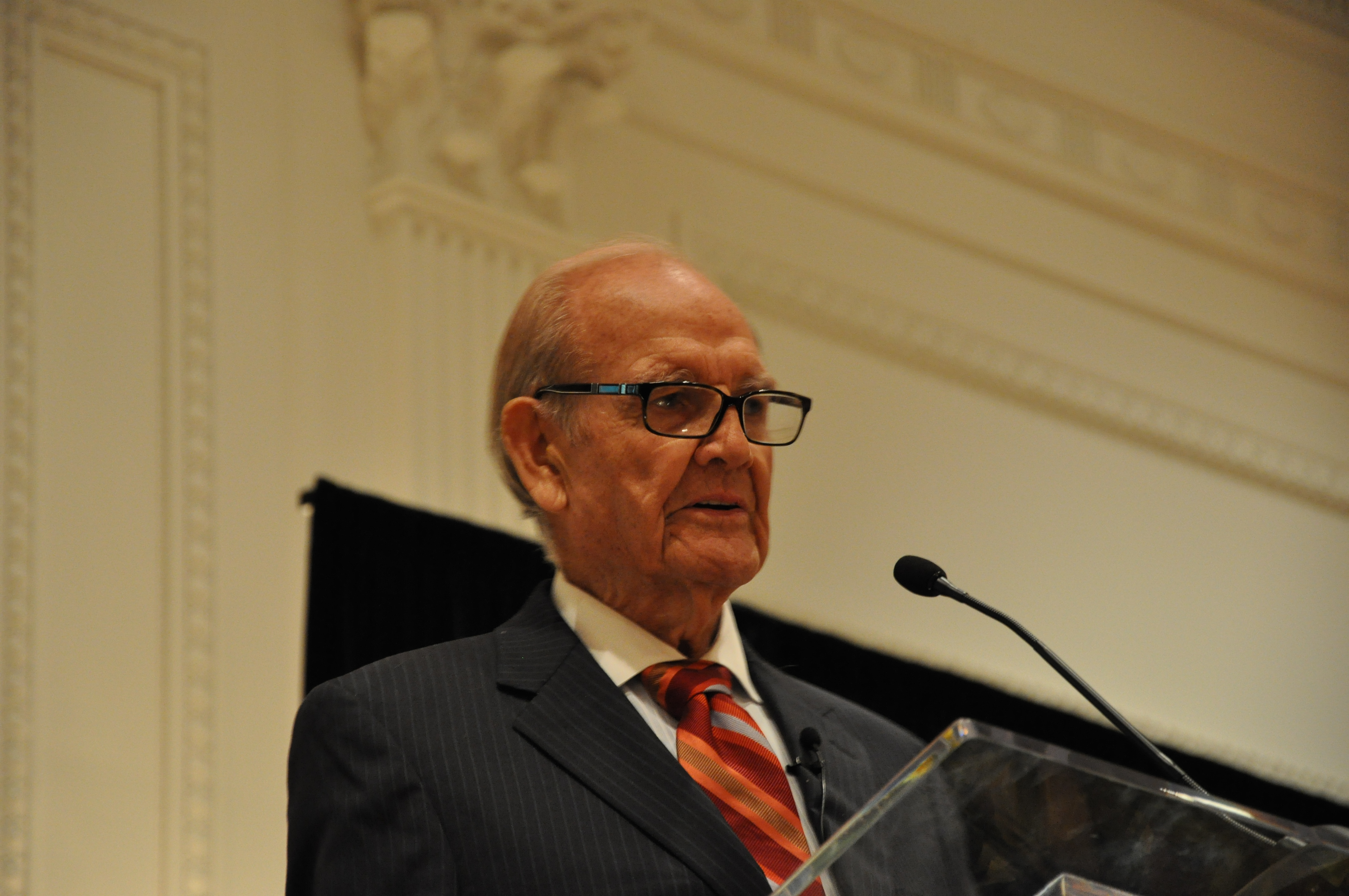
McGovern speaking at the Richard Nixon Presidential Library and Museum, 2009

Owing to his resounding loss to Nixon in the 1972 election and the causes behind it, "McGovernism" became a label that a generation of Democratic politicians tried to avoid. In 1992, nationally syndicated Chicago Tribune columnist Bob Greene wrote, "Once again politicians – mostly Republicans, but some Democrats, too – are using his name as a synonym for presidential campaigns that are laughable and out of touch with the American people." Conservatives used McGovern's name as a ready synonym for what they saw as liberal failures. According to Daniel McCarthy of The American Conservative, the Republican Party began to act after 1972 as if "every Democratic leader, no matter how Southern, how pro-war, how middle-of-the-road, is really a McGovernite. Indeed, for nearly 40 years the conservative movement has defined itself in opposition to the Democratic standard-bearer of 1972. Anti-McGovernism has come to play for the Right the unifying role that anticommunism once played, much to the detriment of older principles such as limited government, fiscal continence, and prudence in foreign policy."

The association with dovishness and weakness on defense has been especially prevalent, although McGovern publicly stated in 1972 that he was not a pacifist and that use of force was sometimes necessary, such as in World War II. McGovern later said in 2001 that his political image had been exaggerated: "I am a liberal and always have been – just not the wild-eyed character the Republicans made me out to be." He continued to feel that he was marginalized with his views miscast. He saw himself as a son of the prairie, in 2005 reciting his traditional upbringing and family values, culminating with "I'm what a normal, healthy, ideal American should be like", and in 2006 asked, "How the hell do you get elected in South Dakota for twenty years if you're a wild-eyed radical?"

In later decades, McGovern remained a symbol, or standard-bearer, of the American Left, particularly in relation to the turbulent 1960s and early 1970s when the country was torn by U.S. involvement in the Vietnam War and the corruption and abuse of power of the Nixon administration. Throughout his career, McGovern's positions reflected his own experiences as well as a personal synthesis of the traditions of American liberalism and progressivism. Southern Methodist University historian Thomas J. Knock wrote in 2003 that "[McGovern's] career was extraordinary and historic ... primarily because of his impress as searching and prophetic critic" and that "few political careers offer an alternative understanding of the American Century as compelling and instructive as McGovern's."

As chairman of the McGovern–Fraser Commission in 1969–1970, McGovern instituted major changes in Democratic party rules that continue to this day and, to a large degree, were ultimately adopted by the Republican Party as well, with large institutional changes taking place in both. Among those was the centralization of decisions about the nominating process at the national party level, rather than with the states. His 1972 campaign fundamentally altered how presidential primary campaigns were waged. Within the Democratic Party, power shifted from the New Deal coalition to younger, more affluent, issue-oriented activists; the women's movement and gay rights movement found a place; skepticism about military buildups and foreign interventions took hold; and the 1960s "New Politics" found its culmination in McGovern's nomination. In turn, the overwhelming defeat of McGovern in the general election led to the liberal wing of the Democratic Party being stigmatized for decades to come and a turn in the party towards centrist directions. McGovern himself recognized the mixed results of his 1972 candidacy, saying, "We made a serious effort to open the doors of the Democratic Party – and as soon as we did, half the Democrats walked out." The 2005 documentary film One Bright Shining Moment: The Forgotten Summer of George McGovern captured some of these achievements and lamentations. SUNY Albany political scientist Bruce Miroff wrote in 2007 that the McGovern campaign was the last time in presidential politics that liberals had "their chance to speak of their goals with enthusiasm and their dreams with fire ... Yet almost at the instant that the insurgents successfully stormed the heights of American politics, they found themselves on the brink of one of the worst free falls on record." Half a century after McGovern's 1972 winning nomination effort, writers were making extensive comparisons between it and the Bernie Sanders 2020 presidential campaign.

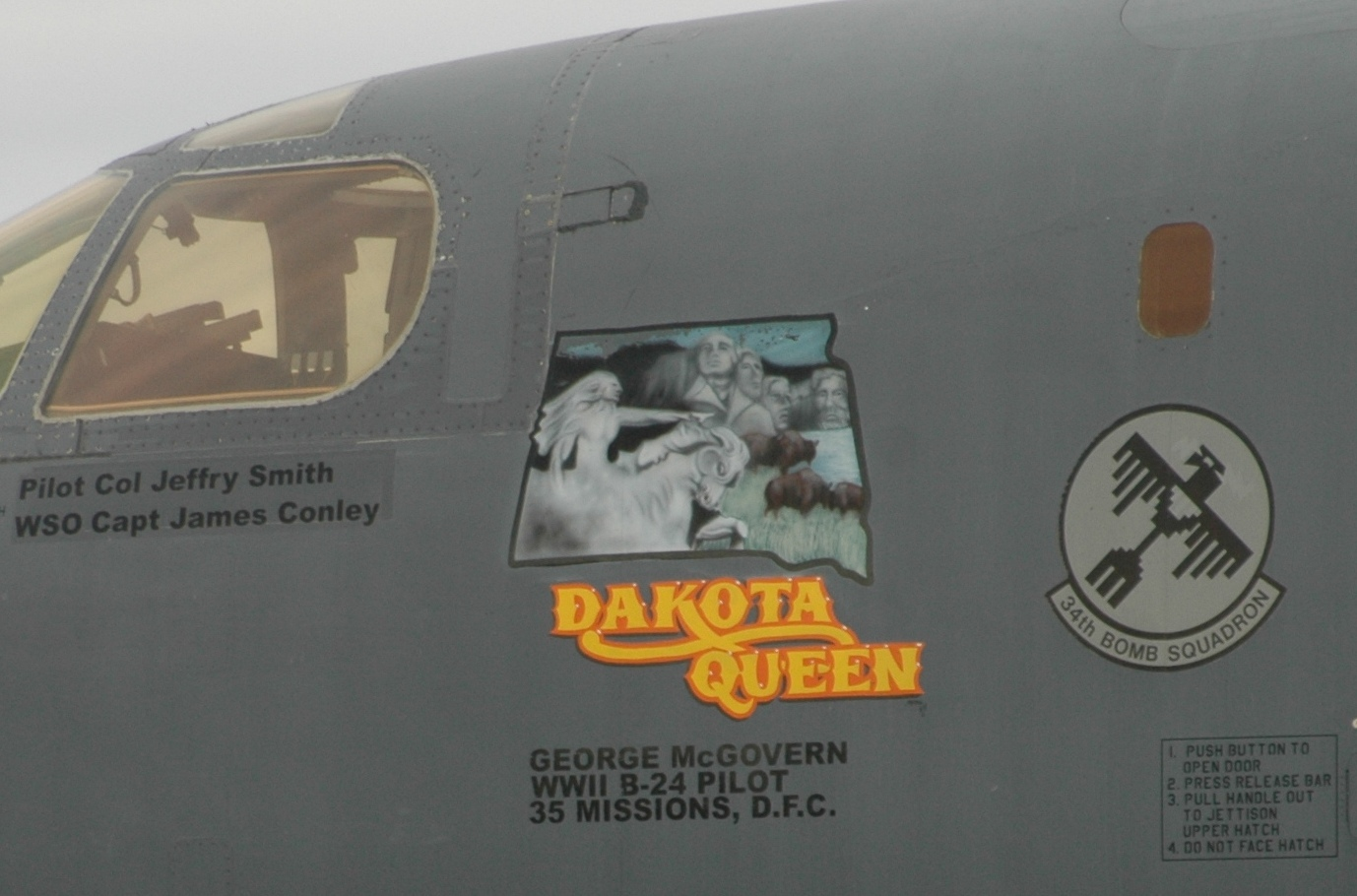
Nose art on a B-1 Lancer seen in 2007 commemorating McGovern's service as a B-24 pilot

Staffers who worked on McGovern's 1972 campaign later became influential within the Democratic Party. Campaign manager Gary Hart staged his own presidential runs in 1984 and 1988. Future president Bill Clinton, with assistance from his future wife and politician, Hillary Rodham, had managed the McGovern campaign's operations in Texas. Hart both embraced and moved away from aspects of his past affiliation with McGovern, while Clinton, and the Democratic Leadership Council movement of which he was a part, explicitly rejected McGovern's ideology. There was still a legacy in terms of staffing, as the Clinton White House would be full of former "McGovernites".

McGovern's post-political career generally enhanced his reputation; Tom Brokaw, who referred to McGovern as part of the "Greatest Generation", wrote in 1998 that "he remains one of the country's most decent and thoughtful public servants." McGovern's legacy also includes his commitment to combating hunger both in the United States and around the globe. He said, "After I'm gone, I want people to say about me: He did the best he could to end hunger in this country and the world." In the view of Knock, McGovern in all his activities arguably accomplished more for people in need than most presidents or secretaries of state in U.S. history. Responding to the Serenity Prayer's desire to "grant me the serenity to accept the things I cannot change", McGovern said simply that he rejected that notion: "I keep trying to change them."

== Writings ==
- McGovern, George S. War Against Want: America's Food for Peace Program, Walker & Co., 1964.
- McGovern, George (ed.) Agricultural Thought in the Twentieth Century, Bobbs-Merrill, 1966.
- McGovern, George. A Time of War! A Time of Peace, Vintage Books, 1968. ISBN 0-394-70481-9.
- McGovern, George S. and Leonard F. Guttridge. The Great Coalfield War, Houghton Mifflin, 1972.
- McGovern, George. Grassroots: The Autobiography of George McGovern, Random House, 1977. ISBN 0-394-41941-3.
- McGovern, George. Terry: My Daughter's Life-And-Death Struggle With Alcoholism, New York: Villard, 1996. ISBN 0-679-44797-0, OCLC 34701568.
- McGovern, George. The Third Freedom: Ending Hunger in Our Time, Simon & Schuster, 2001. ISBN 0-684-85334-5.
- McGovern, George. The Essential America: Our Founders and the Liberal Tradition, Simon & Schuster, 2004. ISBN 0-7432-6927-6.
- McGovern, George. Social Security and the Golden Age: An Essay on the New American Demographic, Speaker's Corner Books, 2005. ISBN 1-55591-589-2.
- McGovern, George, Bob Dole and Donald E. Messer. Ending Hunger Now: A Challenge to Persons of Faith, Augsburg Fortress, 2005. ISBN 0-8006-3782-8.
- McGovern, George and William R. Polk. Out of Iraq: A Practical Plan for Withdrawal Now, Simon & Schuster, 2006. ISBN 1-4165-3456-3.
- McGovern, George S., Donald C. Simmons, Jr. and Daniel Gaken (eds.) Leadership and Service: An Introduction, Kendall Hunt Publishing, 2008. ISBN 0-7575-5109-2.
- McGovern, George S. Abraham Lincoln, Times Books, 2008. ISBN 0-8050-8345-6, OCLC 229028942.
- McGovern, George with Linda Kulman. What It Means to Be a Democrat, Blue Rider Press, 2011. ISBN 0-399-15822-7.

== See also ==
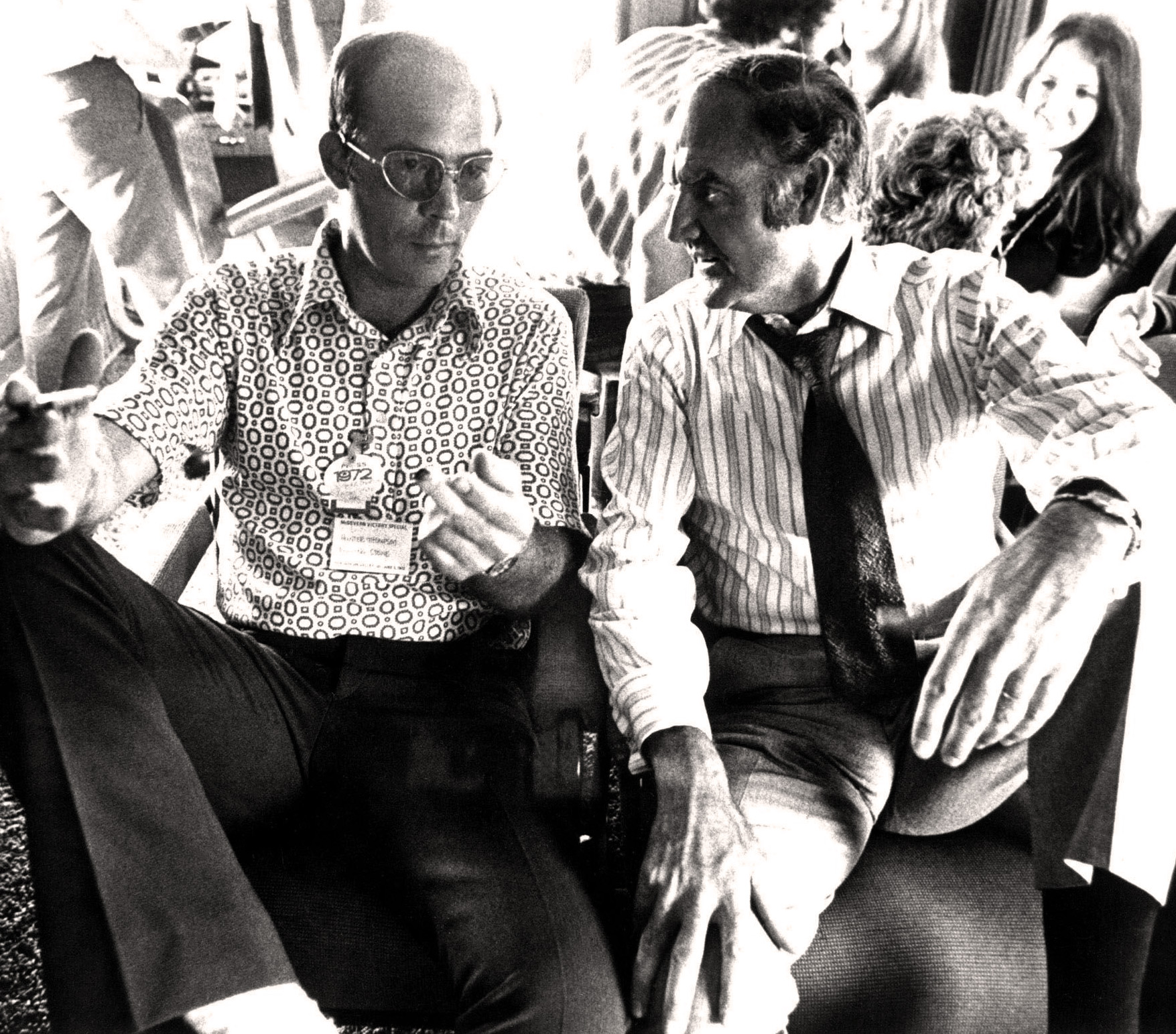
McGovern in conversation with self-described gonzo journalist Hunter S. Thompson, June 1972

- List of awards and honors received by George McGovern
- Electoral history of George McGovern
- List of peace activists
- Jim McGovern (American politician)

== Notes ==
U.S. House of Representatives
Preceded by Harold Lovre	Member of the U.S. House of Representatives from South Dakota's 1st congressional district 1957–1961	Succeeded by Ben Reifel
Government offices
New office	Director of Food for Peace; 1961–1962	Succeeded by Richard W. Reuter
Party political offices
Preceded by Kenneth Holum	Democratic nominee for U.S. Senator from South Dakota (Class 2); 1960	Succeeded by Donn Wright
Preceded by Kenneth Holum	Democratic nominee for U.S. Senator from South Dakota (Class 3); 1962, 1968, 1974, 1980	Succeeded by Tom Daschle
Preceded by Hubert Humphrey	Democratic nominee for President of the United States; 1972	Succeeded by Jimmy Carter
U.S. Senate
Preceded by Joseph H. Bottum	United States Senator (Class 3) from South Dakota; 1963–1981; Served alongside: Karl Mundt, James Abourezk, Larry Pressler	Succeeded by James Abdnor
New office	Chair of the Senate Select Nutrition Committee; 1968–1977	Position abolished
Diplomatic posts
Preceded by Thomas A. Forbord	United States Ambassador to the United Nations Agencies for Food and Agriculture; 1998–2001	Succeeded by Tony P. Hall
