= Joe Bottum =

American politician

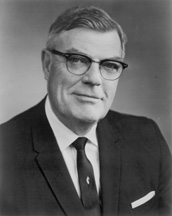

United States Senator from South Dakota
- In office July 9, 1962 – January 3, 1963
- Appointed by: Archie M. Gubbrud
- Preceded by: Francis Case
- Succeeded by: George McGovern

27th Lieutenant Governor of South Dakota
- In office January 3, 1961 – July 9, 1962
- Governor: Archie M. Gubbrud
- Preceded by: John F. Lindley
- Succeeded by: Nils Boe

Personal details
- Born: Joseph Henry Bottum; August 7, 1903 Faulkton, South Dakota, U.S.
- Died: July 4, 1984 (aged 80) Rapid City, South Dakota, U.S.
- Resting place: Pine Lawn Cemetery, Rapid City
- Party: Republican
- Education: University of South Dakota School of Law

Joseph Henry Bottum (August 7, 1903 – July 4, 1984) was an American lawyer, jurist, and politician. He served as the 27th lieutenant governor of South Dakota and as a member of the United States Senate from South Dakota.

== Early life ==
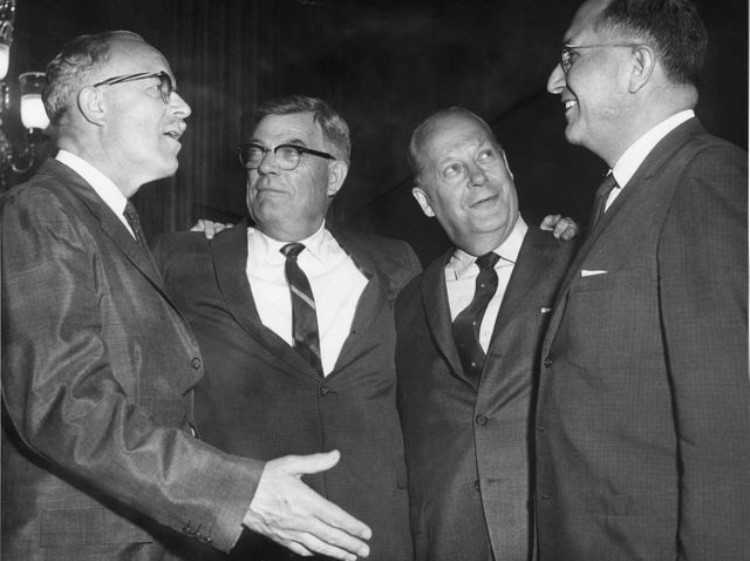
South Dakota's congressional delegation in the 87th U.S. Congress. L-R: Ellis Y. Berry, Joseph H. Bottum, Karl E. Mundt, and Ben Reifel.

Bottum was born in Faulkton, South Dakota and was educated in the public schools of Faulkton. His paternal grandfather, Henry C. Bottum, had been a member of the Wisconsin State Assembly, his maternal grandfather, Darius S. Smith, had been a member of the South Dakota Senate and his father, Joseph H. Bottum, was also a member of the South Dakota Senate. He attended Yankton College and the University of South Dakota (1920–1921). He graduated from the law school of the University of South Dakota in Vermillion in 1927. He was admitted to the bar in 1927 and commenced the practice of law in St. Paul, Minnesota, and later, in Faulkton, South Dakota.

== Career ==
Shortly after beginning his legal practice in Faulkton, Bottum was elected Faulk County State's Attorney in 1932 and was re-elected in 1934. He was appointed State Director of Taxation in 1937. In 1942, Bottum unsuccessfully ran for Governor, losing the Republican primary to Merrell Q. Sharpe. Bottum resigned from the state government in 1943 to accept a position with the Board of Economic Warfare. In 1944, Bottum resigned from the Board and successfully ran for Pennington County State's Attorney; he was re-elected in 1946. In 1948, Bottum was elected Chairman of the Republican Party of South Dakota. In 1950, Bottum ran for Congress from South Dakota's 2nd congressional district, but lost in the Republican primary to Ellis Berry.

He was elected Lieutenant Governor of South Dakota in 1960 and served in Governor Archie M. Gubbrud's administration from 1961 to 1962. In 1962, following the death of U.S. Senator Francis H. Case, Governor Gubbrud appointed him to the Senate for the remainder of Case's term; separately, the state Republican Party named him as the replacement for Case on the ballot in the 1962 election. Bottum faced former U.S. Congressman George McGovern in the general election and narrowly lost the election, falling short by just 597 votes, or 0.23% of the vote.

== Judicial service ==
The son of Joseph Henry Bottum Sr. (1853–1946), circuit judge in Faulkton, South Dakota, from 1911 to 1942, Bottum followed his father onto the court, serving from 1965 to 1980 as a South Dakota circuit judge. Among the trials over which he presided was the controversial prosecution of the Native American activist Russell Means by then-Attorney General Bill Janklow.

== Death and legacy ==
Bottum was a resident of Rapid City, South Dakota, until his death. He is interred at Pine Lawn Cemetery in Rapid City.

Party political offices
Preceded by Alex Olson	Republican nominee for Lieutenant Governor of South Dakota; 1958	Succeeded by Nils Boe
Preceded by Francis H. Case	Republican nominee for U.S. Senator from South Dakota (Class 3); 1962	Succeeded by Archie M. Gubbrud
Political offices
Preceded by John F. Lindley	Lieutenant Governor of South Dakota; 1961–1962	Succeeded by Nils Boe
U.S. Senate
Preceded by Francis H. Case	U.S. senator (Class 3) from South Dakota; 1962–1963; Served alongside: Karl E. Mundt	Succeeded by George McGovern
