= 1960 United States Senate election in South Dakota =

- November 8, 1960
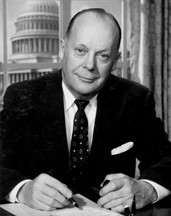

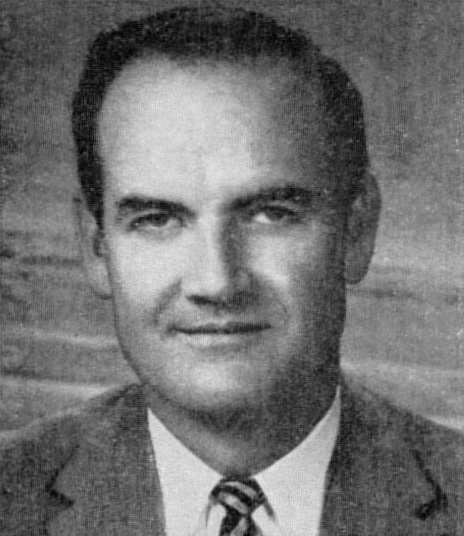
Nominee	Karl E. Mundt	George McGovern
Party	Republican	Democratic
Popular vote	160,181	145,261
Percentage	52.44%	47.56%
- County results Mundt: 50–60% 60–70% 70–80% McGovern: 50–60% 60–70%
U.S. senator before election
Karl E. Mundt
Republican
Elected U.S. Senator
Karl E. Mundt
Republican

The 1960 United States Senate election in South Dakota took place on November 8, 1960. Incumbent Republican Senator Karl E. Mundt ran for re-election to his third term. He was challenged by Congressman George McGovern. Both Mundt and McGovern won their respective primaries unopposed and the campaign between the two began. Despite Richard Nixon's landslide victory in the state in the year's presidential election, the race between Mundt and McGovern was quite close. Mundt narrowly won re-election, and McGovern ran for the U.S. Senate again in 1962. He served alongside Mundt for a decade.

== General election ==
=== Results ===
1960 United States Senate election in South Dakota
Party	Candidate	Votes	%	±%
Republican	Karl E. Mundt (inc.)	160,181	52.44%	−4.85%
Democratic	George McGovern	145,261	47.56%	+4.85%
Majority		14,920	4.88%	−9.71%
Turnout		305,442	100.00%	
Republican hold				

=== Results by county ===
County	Karl Earl Mundt Republican		George Stanley McGovern Democratic		Margin		Total votes cast
County	#	%	#	%	#	%	Total votes cast
Aurora	1,065	41.81%	1,482	58.19%	-417	-16.38%	2,547
Beadle	4,957	49.60%	5,036	50.40%	-79	-0.80%	9,993
Bennett	731	51.99%	675	48.01%	56	3.98%	1,406
Bon Homme	2,358	49.31%	2,424	50.69%	-66	-1.38%	4,782
Brookings	5,021	57.84%	3,660	42.16%	1,361	15.68%	8,681
Brown	7,299	46.07%	8,545	53.93%	-1,246	-7.86%	15,844
Brule	1,051	37.06%	1,785	62.94%	-734	-25.88%	2,836
Buffalo	247	39.84%	373	60.16%	-126	-20.32%	620
Butte	2,468	64.30%	1,370	35.70%	1,098	28.60%	3,838
Campbell	1,275	75.85%	406	24.15%	869	51.70%	1,681
Charles Mix	2,019	38.86%	3,177	61.14%	-1,158	-22.28%	5,196
Clark	1,957	52.79%	1,750	47.21%	207	5.58%	3,707
Clay	2,361	50.96%	2,272	49.04%	89	1.92%	4,633
Codington	4,635	48.73%	4,876	51.27%	-241	-2.54%	9,511
Corson	1,262	53.41%	1,101	46.59%	161	6.82%	2,363
Custer	1,415	59.28%	972	40.72%	443	18.56%	2,387
Davison	3,279	40.49%	4,819	59.51%	-1,540	-19.02%	8,098
Day	2,230	40.84%	3,231	59.16%	-1,001	-18.32%	5,461
Deuel	1,652	53.71%	1,424	46.29%	228	7.42%	3,076
Dewey	1,072	49.29%	1,103	50.71%	-31	-1.42%	2,175
Douglas	1,571	61.42%	987	38.58%	584	22.84%	2,558
Edmunds	1,558	46.66%	1,781	53.34%	-223	-6.68%	3,339
Fall River	2,454	61.83%	1,515	38.17%	939	23.66%	3,969
Faulk	1,127	49.36%	1,156	50.64%	-29	-1.28%	2,283
Grant	2,397	50.35%	2,364	49.65%	33	0.70%	4,761
Gregory	1,690	47.00%	1,906	53.00%	-216	-6.00%	3,596
Haakon	942	60.27%	621	39.73%	321	20.54%	1,563
Hamlin	1,869	55.87%	1,476	44.13%	393	11.74%	3,345
Hand	1,692	51.46%	1,596	48.54%	96	2.92%	3,288
Hanson	934	41.90%	1,295	58.10%	-361	-16.20%	2,229
Harding	687	65.00%	370	35.00%	317	30.00%	1,057
Hughes	3,043	56.73%	2,321	43.27%	722	13.46%	5,364
Hutchinson	3,206	61.14%	2,038	38.86%	1,168	22.28%	5,244
Hyde	712	48.60%	753	51.40%	-41	-2.80%	1,465
Jackson	534	56.39%	413	43.61%	121	12.78%	947
Jerauld	1,030	50.10%	1,026	49.90%	4	0.20%	2,056
Jones	543	50.51%	532	49.49%	11	1.02%	1,075
Kingsbury	2,549	56.10%	1,995	43.90%	554	12.20%	4,544
Lake	3,225	56.56%	2,477	43.44%	748	13.12%	5,702
Lawrence	4,947	65.09%	2,653	34.91%	2,294	30.18%	7,600
Lincoln	3,553	58.43%	2,528	41.57%	1,025	16.86%	6,081
Lyman	1,083	51.87%	1,005	48.13%	78	3.74%	2,088
Marshall	1,515	45.45%	1,818	54.55%	-303	-9.10%	3,333
McCook	2,038	49.25%	2,100	50.75%	-62	-1.50%	4,138
McPherson	2,125	71.21%	859	28.79%	1,266	42.42%	2,984
Meade	2,659	56.70%	2,031	43.30%	628	13.40%	4,690
Mellette	703	54.71%	582	45.29%	121	9.42%	1,285
Miner	1,207	42.59%	1,627	57.41%	-420	-14.82%	2,834
Minnehaha	20,660	54.22%	17,443	45.78%	3,217	8.44%	38,103
Moody	1,889	47.62%	2,078	52.38%	-189	-4.76%	3,967
Pennington	10,511	56.88%	7,968	43.12%	2,543	13.76%	18,479
Perkins	1,720	59.33%	1,179	40.67%	541	18.66%	2,899
Potter	1,316	56.60%	1,009	43.40%	307	13.20%	2,325
Roberts	2,608	43.58%	3,377	56.42%	-769	-12.84%	5,985
Sanborn	1,139	44.95%	1,395	55.05%	-256	-10.10%	2,534
Shannon	645	37.35%	1,082	62.65%	-437	-25.30%	1,727
Spink	2,481	46.25%	2,883	53.75%	-402	-7.50%	5,364
Stanley	624	44.01%	794	55.99%	-170	-11.98%	1,418
Sully	753	56.03%	591	43.97%	162	12.06%	1,344
Todd	889	49.14%	920	50.86%	-31	-1.72%	1,809
Tripp	2,203	52.67%	1,980	47.33%	223	5.34%	4,183
Turner	3,538	63.31%	2,050	36.69%	1,488	26.62%	5,588
Union	2,401	49.16%	2,483	50.84%	-82	-1.68%	4,884
Walworth	2,158	55.65%	1,720	44.35%	438	11.30%	3,878
Washabaugh	229	48.93%	239	51.07%	-10	-2.14%	468
Yankton	3,939	55.01%	3,222	44.99%	717	10.02%	7,161
Ziebach	531	49.49%	542	50.51%	-11	-1.02%	1,073
Totals	160,181	52.44%	145,261	47.56%	14,920	4.88%	304,442
