= 2022 United States Senate election in South Dakota =

- November 8, 2022
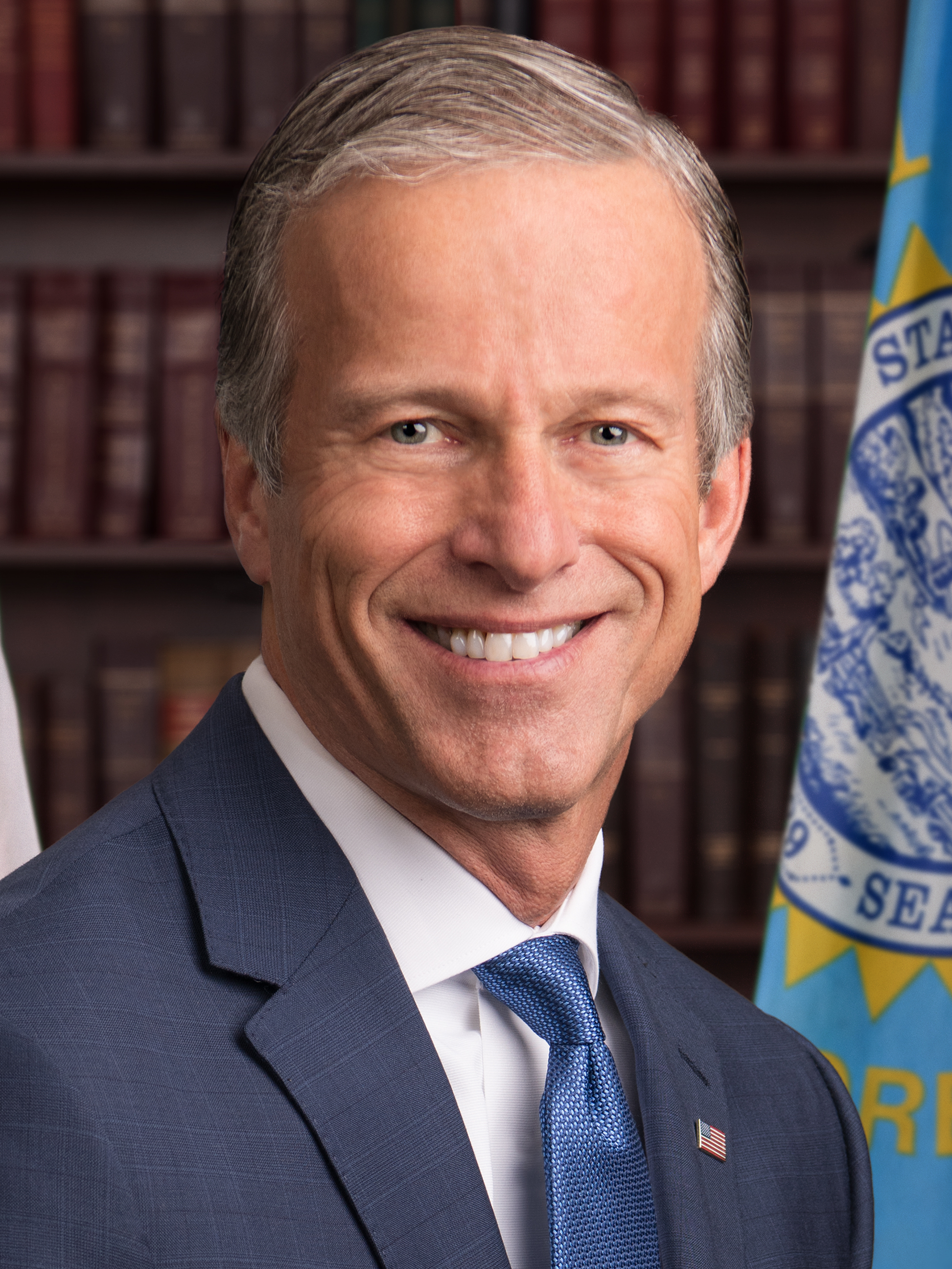

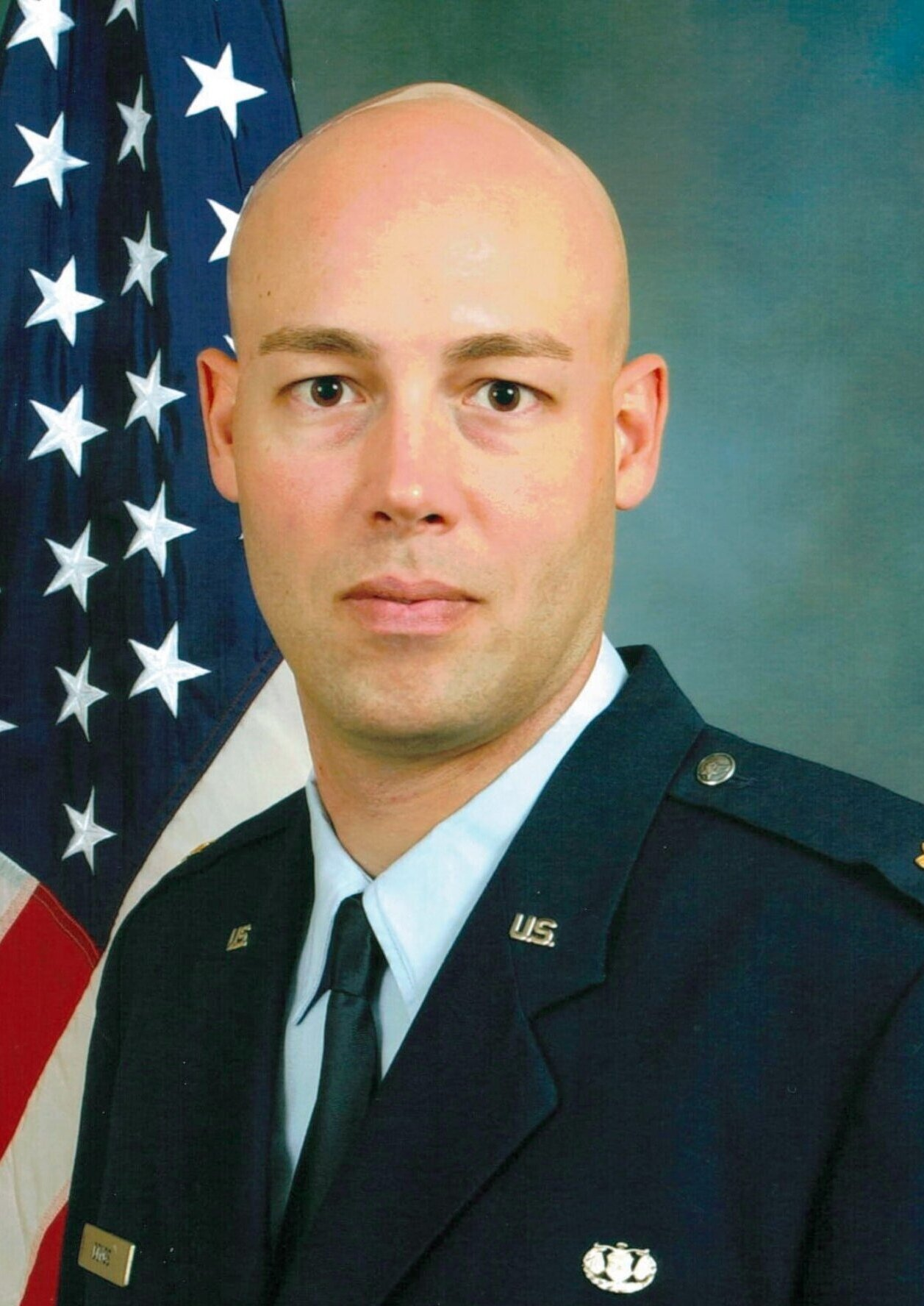
Nominee	John Thune	Brian Bengs
Party	Republican	Democratic
Popular vote	242,316	91,007
Percentage	69.63%	26.15%
- County results Thune: 40–50% 50–60% 60–70% 70–80% 80–90% >90% Bengs: 50–60% 60–70% 70–80%
U.S. senator before election
John Thune
Republican
Elected U.S. Senator
John Thune
Republican

The 2022 United States Senate election in South Dakota was held on November 8, 2022, to elect a member of the United States Senate to represent the State of South Dakota. Incumbent three-term Republican U.S. Senator John Thune, who was the Senate minority whip, was first elected in 2004, defeating Democratic incumbent Tom Daschle, the then-Senate minority leader. He ran for reelection to a fourth term. The Democratic nominee was 26-year Navy and Air Force JAG Corps veteran, and former college professor Brian Bengs. Thune was ultimately reelected, becoming the first U.S. senator from South Dakota to be elected to a fourth term since Karl Mundt in 1966, and only the second to do so after Mundt.

== Republican primary ==
On December 23, 2020, then-President Donald Trump said Thune would face a primary challenger after Thune refused to support a challenge of the 2020 Electoral College results, tweeting: "Republicans in the Senate so quickly forget. Right now they would be down 8 seats without my backing them in the last Election. RINO John Thune, 'Mitch's boy', should just let it play out. South Dakota doesn't like weakness. He will be primaried in 2022, political career over!!!" South Dakota Governor Kristi Noem stated she would not challenge Thune for the seat. On January 1, 2021, Trump tweeted that Noem should challenge Thune in a primary, despite Noem previously saying she would not do so, instead running for re-election as governor in 2022.

=== Candidates ===
==== Nominee ====
- John Thune, incumbent U.S. senator (2005–present) and Senate minority whip (2021–2025)

==== Eliminated in primary ====
- Mark Mowry, musician and rancher
- Bruce Buffalo Dreamer Whalen, Oglala Sioux tribal administrator, former chair of the Oglala Lakota County Republican Party, and nominee for South Dakota's at-large congressional district in 2006

==== Withdrew ====
- Patrick Schubert, software executive

==== Declined ====
- Marty Jackley, former South Dakota attorney general (2009–2019) and candidate for governor of South Dakota in 2018 (ran for attorney general)
- Dusty Johnson, U.S. representative from South Dakota's at-large congressional district (2019–present) (ran for re-election)
- Kristi Noem, governor of South Dakota (2019–2025) and former U.S. representative for South Dakota's at-large congressional district (2011–2019) (ran for re-election)

=== Endorsements ===
John Thune

Organizations

- American Israel Public Affairs Committee
- Citizens for Responsible Energy Solutions
- NRA Political Victory Fund

=== Polling ===
Poll source	Date(s) administered	Sample size (Note: Key: A – all adults RV – registered voters LV – likely voters V – unclear)	Margin of error	Mark Mowry	John Thune	Bruce Whalen	Undecided
South Dakota State University	May 2–15, 2022	– (LV)	± 3.0%	4%	46%	10%	41%

Hypothetical polling

Poll source	Date(s) administered	Sample size	Margin of error	Dusty Johnson	Kristi Noem	John Thune	Undecided
Fabrizio Lee (R) (Note: This poll was sponsored by the American Potential Fund.)	January 2022	400 (LV)	± 4.9%	30%	–	47%	23%
Fabrizio Lee (R)	January 2022	400 (LV)	± 4.9%	–	49%	40%	10%

=== Results ===
Results by county Thune: 50–60%; 60–70%; 70–80%; 80–90%

Republican primary results
Party	Candidate	Votes	%
Republican	John Thune (incumbent)	85,613	72.24%
Republican	Bruce Whalen	24,071	20.31%
Republican	Mark Mowry	8,827	7.45%
Total votes		118,511	100.0%

== Democratic primary ==
=== Candidates ===
==== Nominee ====
- Brian Bengs, U.S. Navy and Air Force veteran, and former Northern State University political science professor

==== Declined ====
- Troy Heinert, minority leader of the South Dakota Senate (2019–2023) from the 26th district (2015–2023)
- Brendan Johnson, former U.S. attorney for South Dakota (2009–2015) and son of former U.S. Senator Tim Johnson
- Stephanie Herseth Sandlin, president of Augustana University (2017–present) and former U.S. representative for South Dakota's at-large congressional district (2004–2011)
- Billie Sutton, former minority leader of the South Dakota Senate (2015–2019) from the 21st district (2011–2019) and nominee for governor in 2018

== Libertarian convention ==
=== Candidates ===
==== Nominee ====
- Tamara Lesnar, small business owner

== General election ==
=== Predictions ===
Source	Ranking	As of
The Cook Political Report	Solid R	November 19, 2021
Inside Elections	Solid R	January 7, 2022
Sabato's Crystal Ball	Safe R	November 3, 2021
Politico	Solid R	April 1, 2022
RCP	Safe R	January 10, 2022
Fox News	Solid R	May 12, 2022
DDHQ	Solid R	July 20, 2022
538	Solid R	June 30, 2022
The Economist	Safe R	September 7, 2022

=== Post-primary endorsements ===
Brian Bengs (D)

Organizations

- National Association of Social Workers
John Thune (R)

Organizations

- Animal Wellness Action
- International Franchise Association
- National Right to Life Committee
- National Wildlife Federation

=== Polling ===
Poll source	Date(s) administered	Sample size	Margin of error	John Thune (R)	Brian Bengs (D)	Tamara Lesnar (L)	Undecided
South Dakota State University	September 28 – October 10, 2022	565 (RV)	± 4.0%	53%	28%	–	20%
Lake Research Partners (D)	September 6–11, 2022	400 (LV)	± 4.9%	46%	33%	8%	11%
Moore Information Group (R)	March 14–19, 2022	400 (LV)	± 5.0%	59%	24%	6%	11%

=== Results ===
2022 United States Senate election in South Dakota
Party	Candidate	Votes	%	±%
Republican	John Thune (incumbent)	242,316	69.63%	−2.20%
Democratic	Brian Bengs	91,007	26.15%	−2.02%
Libertarian	Tamara Lesnar	14,697	4.22%	N/A
Total votes		348,020	100.00%	N/A
Republican hold				

==== By county ====
County	John Thune Republican		Brian Bengs Democratic		Tamara Lesnar Libertarian		Margin		Total
County	#	%	#	%	#	%	#	%	Total
Aurora	978	80.56%	170	14.00%	66	5.44%	808	66.56%	1,214
Beadle	4,441	76.08%	1,214	20.80%	182	3.12%	3,227	55.29%	5,837
Bennett	684	67.06%	295	28.92%	41	4.02%	389	38.14%	1,020
Bon Homme	2,010	78.70%	453	17.74%	91	3.56%	1,557	60.96%	2,554
Brookings	7,990	64.69%	3,816	30.90%	545	4.41%	4,174	33.79%	12,351
Brown	9,577	68.80%	3,893	27.96%	451	3.24%	5,684	40.83%	13,921
Brule	1,573	74.98%	428	20.40%	97	4.62%	1,145	54.58%	2,098
Buffalo	173	44.36%	202	51.79%	15	3.85%	-29	-7.44%	390
Butte	3,269	78.62%	597	14.36%	292	7.02%	2,672	64.26%	4,158
Campbell	571	86.12%	66	9.95%	26	3.92%	505	76.17%	663
Charles Mix	2,323	75.20%	666	21.56%	100	3.24%	1,657	53.64%	3,089
Clark	1,307	82.05%	230	14.44%	56	3.52%	1,077	67.61%	1,593
Clay	2,522	53.51%	2,042	43.33%	149	3.16%	480	10.18%	4,713
Codington	8,279	75.24%	2,265	20.58%	460	4.18%	6,014	54.65%	11,004
Corson	534	57.73%	334	36.11%	57	6.16%	200	21.62%	925
Custer	3,756	74.52%	1,017	20.18%	267	5.30%	2,739	54.35%	5,040
Davison	5,420	75.17%	1,524	21.14%	266	3.69%	3,896	54.04%	7,210
Day	1,796	71.44%	602	23.95%	116	4.61%	1,194	47.49%	2,514
Deuel	1,548	77.95%	346	17.42%	92	4.63%	1,202	60.52%	1,986
Dewey	770	49.36%	720	46.15%	70	4.49%	50	3.21%	1,560
Douglas	1,308	89.16%	117	7.98%	42	2.86%	1,191	81.19%	1,467
Edmunds	1,385	82.10%	253	15.00%	49	2.90%	1,132	67.10%	1,687
Fall River	2,754	75.64%	665	18.26%	222	6.10%	2,089	57.37%	3,641
Faulk	780	82.37%	120	12.67%	47	4.96%	660	69.69%	947
Grant	2,492	77.92%	601	18.79%	105	3.28%	1,891	59.13%	3,198
Gregory	1,663	82.16%	279	13.78%	82	4.05%	1,384	68.38%	2,024
Haakon	864	89.07%	56	5.77%	50	5.15%	808	83.30%	970
Hamlin	2,214	81.91%	366	13.54%	123	4.55%	1,848	68.37%	2,703
Hand	1,242	82.25%	198	13.11%	70	4.64%	1,044	69.14%	1,510
Hanson	1,323	81.22%	254	15.59%	52	3.19%	1,069	65.62%	1,629
Harding	605	90.57%	22	3.29%	41	6.14%	564	84.43%	668
Hughes	5,467	73.37%	1,683	22.59%	301	4.04%	3,784	50.79%	7,451
Hutchinson	2,619	83.35%	417	13.27%	106	3.37%	2,202	70.08%	3,142
Hyde	484	83.45%	78	13.45%	18	3.10%	406	70.00%	580
Jackson	617	68.63%	215	23.92%	67	7.45%	402	44.72%	899
Jerauld	676	78.24%	154	17.82%	34	3.94%	522	60.42%	864
Jones	383	82.37%	46	9.89%	36	7.74%	337	72.47%	465
Kingsbury	2,000	79.05%	441	17.43%	89	3.52%	1,559	61.62%	2,530
Lake	3,615	73.51%	1,139	23.16%	164	3.33%	2,476	50.35%	4,918
Lawrence	8,439	69.48%	3,061	25.20%	646	5.32%	5,378	44.28%	12,146
Lincoln	19,703	70.42%	7,365	26.32%	912	3.26%	12,338	44.10%	27,980
Lyman	944	72.67%	290	22.32%	65	5.00%	654	50.35%	1,299
Marshall	1,272	67.70%	545	29.00%	62	3.30%	727	38.69%	1,879
McCook	2,033	80.26%	408	16.11%	92	3.63%	1,625	64.15%	2,533
McPherson	954	86.57%	108	9.80%	40	3.63%	846	76.77%	1,102
Meade	8,934	75.90%	2,134	18.13%	702	5.96%	6,800	57.77%	11,770
Mellette	415	66.51%	165	26.44%	44	7.05%	250	40.06%	624
Miner	813	80.98%	161	16.04%	30	2.99%	652	64.94%	1,004
Minnehaha	46,551	62.78%	24,772	33.41%	2,821	3.80%	21,779	29.37%	74,144
Moody	1,839	69.61%	694	26.27%	109	4.13%	1,145	43.34%	2,642
Oglala Lakota	422	17.30%	1,889	77.42%	129	5.29%	-1,467	-60.12%	2,440
Pennington	30,398	67.32%	12,441	27.55%	2,314	5.12%	17,957	39.77%	45,153
Perkins	1,141	83.35%	133	9.72%	95	6.94%	1,008	73.63%	1,369
Potter	937	85.73%	123	11.25%	33	3.02%	814	74.47%	1,093
Roberts	2,384	67.52%	1,000	28.32%	147	4.16%	1,384	39.20%	3,531
Sanborn	821	81.94%	154	15.37%	27	2.69%	667	66.57%	1,002
Spink	2,027	76.09%	546	20.50%	91	3.42%	1,481	55.59%	2,664
Stanley	1,138	78.65%	245	16.93%	64	4.42%	893	61.71%	1,447
Sully	622	79.44%	114	14.56%	47	6.00%	508	64.88%	783
Todd	502	26.27%	1,308	68.45%	101	5.29%	-806	-42.18%	1,911
Tripp	1,861	83.19%	263	11.76%	113	5.05%	1,598	71.43%	2,237
Turner	3,078	79.99%	602	15.64%	168	4.37%	2,476	64.35%	3,848
Union	4,991	74.30%	1,497	22.29%	229	3.41%	3,494	52.02%	6,717
Walworth	1,645	80.72%	301	14.77%	92	4.51%	1,344	65.95%	2,038
Yankton	6,051	68.35%	2,462	27.81%	340	3.84%	3,589	40.54%	8,853
Ziebach	389	57.37%	242	35.69%	47	6.93%	147	21.68%	678
Totals	242,316	69.63%	91,007	26.15%	14,697	4.22%	151,309	43.48%	348,020

== See also ==
- 2022 United States Senate elections
- 2022 South Dakota elections

== Notes ==
Partisan clients
