= 1956 United States Senate election in South Dakota =

- November 6, 1956
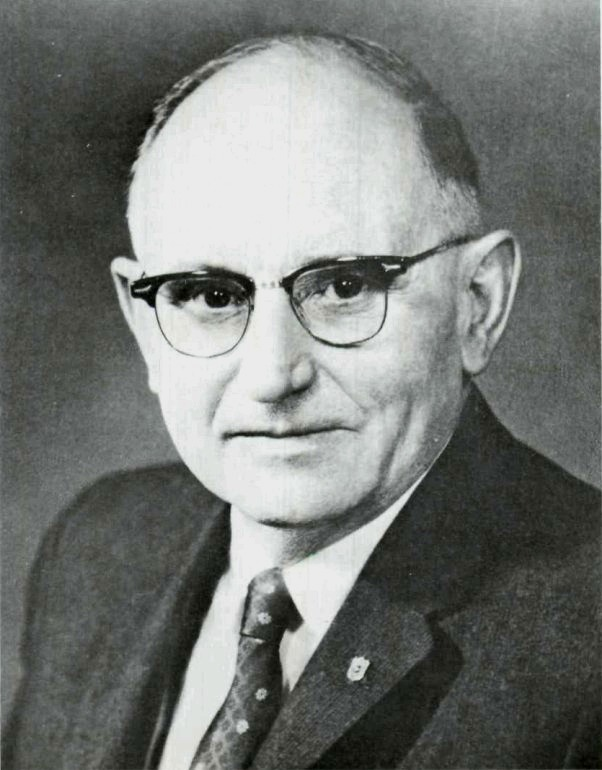

Nominee	Francis Case	Kenneth Holum
Party	Republican	Democratic
Popular vote	147,621	143,001
Percentage	50.79%	49.21%
- County results Case: 50–60% 60–70% 70–80% Holum: 50–60% 60–70%
U.S. senator before election
Francis H. Case
Republican
Elected U.S. Senator
Francis H. Case
Republican

The 1956 United States Senate election in South Dakota took place on November 6, 1956. Incumbent Republican Senator Francis H. Case ran for re-election to a second term. In the general election, Case was opposed by former State Representative Kenneth Holum, who was the 1954 Democratic nominee for the U.S. Senate. Owing in part to anger among the state's farmers, the race between Case and Holum was quite close, with Holum leading Case on election night and only falling behind the next day. Case ended up narrowly winning re-election, defeating Holum by just 4,620 votes.

== Democratic primary ==
=== Candidates ===
- Kenneth Holum, former State Representative, 1954 Democratic nominee for the U.S. Senate
- Merton B. Time, Mitchell municipal judge, attorney

=== Results ===
Democratic primary
Party	Candidate	Votes	%
Democratic	Kenneth Holum	23,464	60.85%
Democratic	Merton B. Tice	15,099	39.15%
Total votes		38,563	100.00%

== Republican primary ==
Incumbent U.S. Senator Francis H. Case was the only Republican candidate to file for the U.S. Senate, removing the race from the primary ballot.

== General election ==
=== Results ===
1956 United States Senate election in South Dakota
Party	Candidate	Votes	%	±%
Republican	Francis H. Case (inc.)	147,621	50.79%	−13.12%
Democratic	Kenneth Holum	143,001	49.21%	+13.12%
Majority		4,620	1.59%	−26.25%
Turnout		290,622		
Republican hold				
