= South Dakota's congressional delegations =

Map showing the location of south Dakota within the United States.

South Dakota has sent congressional delegations to the United States Senate and United States House of Representatives since it became a state in 1889, beginning with the 51st United States Congress that year. Before becoming a state, South Dakota – as part of the larger Dakota Territory – elected a non-voting delegate at-large to Congress from 1861 to 1889.

Each state elects two senators to serve for six years in general elections, with their re-election staggered. Prior to the ratification of the Seventeenth Amendment in 1913, South Dakota senators were elected by the South Dakota Legislature; afterwards, senators were elected directly by the people of the state. Each state elects a varying number of, but at least one, member of the House, depending on population, to two-year terms. South Dakota has sent one at-large member to the House since the 1980 United States Census. Currently, South Dakota is represented in the Senate by Mike Rounds and John Thune, and in the House by Dusty Johnson. The first and only woman to serve South Dakota in the House and Senate was Gladys Pyle. Three women have served South Dakota in the House, while two have served in the Senate.

The current dean, or longest-serving member, of the South Dakota delegiation is Republican Senator John Thune, who has served in the Senate since his election in 2004. The longest-serving member of Congress from South Dakota is Karl E. Mundt, who served 34 years combined in the House and Senate.

== United States Senate ==
Current U.S. senators from South Dakota
South Dakota CPVI (2025): R+15	Class II senator	Class III senator
South Dakota CPVI (2025): R+15	Mike Rounds (Junior senator) (Fort Pierre)	John Thune (Senior senator) (Sioux Falls)
Party	Republican	Republican
Incumbent since	January 3, 2015	January 3, 2005

Class II senator	Congress	Class III senator
Richard F. Pettigrew (R)	51st (1889–1891)	Gideon C. Moody (R)
Richard F. Pettigrew (R)	52nd (1891–1893)	James H. Kyle (I)
Richard F. Pettigrew (R)	53rd (1893–1895)	James H. Kyle (Pop)
Richard F. Pettigrew (R)	54th (1895–1897)	James H. Kyle (Pop)
Richard F. Pettigrew (SvR)	55th (1897–1899)	James H. Kyle (Pop)
Richard F. Pettigrew (SvR)	56th (1899–1901)	James H. Kyle (Pop)
Robert J. Gamble (R)	57th (1901–1903)	James H. Kyle (R)
Robert J. Gamble (R)	57th (1901–1903)	Alfred B. Kittredge (R)
Robert J. Gamble (R)	58th (1903–1905)	Alfred B. Kittredge (R)
Robert J. Gamble (R)	59th (1905–1907)	Alfred B. Kittredge (R)
Robert J. Gamble (R)	60th (1907–1909)	Alfred B. Kittredge (R)
Robert J. Gamble (R)	61st (1909–1911)	Coe I. Crawford (R)
Robert J. Gamble (R)	62nd (1911–1913)	Coe I. Crawford (R)
Thomas Sterling (R)	63rd (1913–1915)	Coe I. Crawford (R)
Thomas Sterling (R)	64th (1915–1917)	Edwin S. Johnson (D)
Thomas Sterling (R)	65th (1917–1919)	Edwin S. Johnson (D)
Thomas Sterling (R)	66th (1919–1921)	Edwin S. Johnson (D)
Thomas Sterling (R)	67th (1921–1923)	Peter Norbeck (R)
Thomas Sterling (R)	68th (1923–1925)	Peter Norbeck (R)
William H. McMaster (R)	69th (1925–1927)	Peter Norbeck (R)
William H. McMaster (R)	70th (1927–1929)	Peter Norbeck (R)
William H. McMaster (R)	71st (1929–1931)	Peter Norbeck (R)
William J. Bulow (D)	72nd (1931–1933)	Peter Norbeck (R)
William J. Bulow (D)	73rd (1933–1935)	Peter Norbeck (R)
William J. Bulow (D)	74th (1935–1937)	Peter Norbeck (R)
William J. Bulow (D)	74th (1935–1937)	Herbert E. Hitchcock (D)
William J. Bulow (D)	75th (1937–1939)	Herbert E. Hitchcock (D)
William J. Bulow (D)	75th (1937–1939)	Gladys Pyle (R)
William J. Bulow (D)	76th (1939–1941)	Chan Gurney (R)
William J. Bulow (D)	77th (1941–1943)	Chan Gurney (R)
Harlan J. Bushfield (R)	78th (1943–1945)	Chan Gurney (R)
Harlan J. Bushfield (R)	79th (1945–1947)	Chan Gurney (R)
Harlan J. Bushfield (R)	80th (1947–1949)	Chan Gurney (R)
Vera C. Bushfield (R)	80th (1947–1949)	Chan Gurney (R)
Karl Mundt (R)	80th (1947–1949)	Chan Gurney (R)
Karl Mundt (R)	81st (1949–1951)	Chan Gurney (R)
Karl Mundt (R)	82nd (1951–1953)	Francis Case (R)
Karl Mundt (R)	83rd (1953–1955)	Francis Case (R)
Karl Mundt (R)	84th (1955–1957)	Francis Case (R)
Karl Mundt (R)	85th (1957–1959)	Francis Case (R)
Karl Mundt (R)	86th (1959–1961)	Francis Case (R)
Karl Mundt (R)	87th (1961–1963)	Francis Case (R)
Karl Mundt (R)	87th (1961–1963)	Joe Bottum (R)
Karl Mundt (R)	88th (1963–1965)	George McGovern (D)
Karl Mundt (R)	89th (1965–1967)	George McGovern (D)
Karl Mundt (R)	90th (1967–1969)	George McGovern (D)
Karl Mundt (R)	91st (1969–1971)	George McGovern (D)
Karl Mundt (R)	92nd (1971–1973)	George McGovern (D)
James Abourezk (D)	93rd (1973–1975)	George McGovern (D)
James Abourezk (D)	94th (1975–1977)	George McGovern (D)
James Abourezk (D)	95th (1977–1979)	George McGovern (D)
Larry Pressler (R)	96th (1979–1981)	George McGovern (D)
Larry Pressler (R)	97th (1981–1983)	James Abdnor (R)
Larry Pressler (R)	98th (1983–1985)	James Abdnor (R)
Larry Pressler (R)	99th (1985–1987)	James Abdnor (R)
Larry Pressler (R)	100th (1987–1989)	Tom Daschle (D)
Larry Pressler (R)	101st (1989–1991)	Tom Daschle (D)
Larry Pressler (R)	102nd (1991–1993)	Tom Daschle (D)
Larry Pressler (R)	103rd (1993–1995)	Tom Daschle (D)
Larry Pressler (R)	104th (1995–1997)	Tom Daschle (D)
Tim Johnson (D)	105th (1997–1999)	Tom Daschle (D)
Tim Johnson (D)	106th (1999–2001)	Tom Daschle (D)
Tim Johnson (D)	107th (2001–2003)	Tom Daschle (D)
Tim Johnson (D)	108th (2003–2005)	Tom Daschle (D)
Tim Johnson (D)	109th (2005–2007)	John Thune (R)
Tim Johnson (D)	110th (2007–2009)	John Thune (R)
Tim Johnson (D)	111th (2009–2011)	John Thune (R)
Tim Johnson (D)	112th (2011–2013)	John Thune (R)
Tim Johnson (D)	113th (2013–2015)	John Thune (R)
Mike Rounds (R)	114th (2015–2017)	John Thune (R)
Mike Rounds (R)	115th (2017–2019)	John Thune (R)
Mike Rounds (R)	116th (2019-2021)	John Thune (R)
Mike Rounds (R)	117th (2021-2023)	John Thune (R)
Mike Rounds (R)	118th (2023-2025)	John Thune (R)
Mike Rounds (R)	119th (2025-2027)	John Thune (R)
Mike Rounds (R)	120th (2025-2027)	John Thune (R)

== U.S. House of Representatives ==
Current U.S. representatives from South Dakota
District	Member (Residence)	Party	Incumbent since	CPVI (2025)	District map
At-large	Dusty Johnson (Mitchell)	Republican	January 3, 2019	R+15	

=== 1889–1913: elected at-large ===
Congress	Elected at-large	
Congress	1st seat	2nd seat
51st (1889–1891)	John Pickler (R)	Oscar S. Gifford (R)
52nd (1891–1893)	John Pickler (R)	John Rankin Gamble (R)
52nd (1891–1893)	John Pickler (R)	John L. Jolley (R)
53rd (1893–1895)	John Pickler (R)	William V. Lucas (R)
54th (1895–1897)	John Pickler (R)	Robert J. Gamble (R)
55th (1897–1899)	John Edward Kelley (Pop)	Freeman Knowles (Pop)
56th (1899–1901)	Charles H. Burke (R)	Robert J. Gamble (R)
57th (1901–1903)	Charles H. Burke (R)	Eben Martin (R)
58th (1903–1905)	Charles H. Burke (R)	Eben Martin (R)
59th (1905–1907)	Charles H. Burke (R)	Eben Martin (R)
60th (1907–1909)	Philo Hall (R)	William H. Parker (R)
60th (1907–1909)	Philo Hall (R)	Eben Martin (R)
61st (1909–1911)	Charles H. Burke (R)	Eben Martin (R)
62nd (1911–1913)	Charles H. Burke (R)	Eben Martin (R)

=== 1913–1983: elected by district ===
Congress	1st district	2nd district	3rd district
63rd (1913–1915)	Charles Hall Dillon (R)	Charles H. Burke (R)	Eben Martin (R)
64th (1915–1917)	Charles Hall Dillon (R)	Royal C. Johnson (R)	Harry Gandy (D)
65th (1917–1919)	Charles Hall Dillon (R)	Royal C. Johnson (R)	Harry Gandy (D)
66th (1919–1921)	Charles A. Christopherson (R)	Royal C. Johnson (R)	Harry Gandy (D)
67th (1921–1923)	Charles A. Christopherson (R)	Royal C. Johnson (R)	William Williamson (R)
68th (1923–1925)	Charles A. Christopherson (R)	Royal C. Johnson (R)	William Williamson (R)
69th (1925–1927)	Charles A. Christopherson (R)	Royal C. Johnson (R)	William Williamson (R)
70th (1927–1929)	Charles A. Christopherson (R)	Royal C. Johnson (R)	William Williamson (R)
71st (1929–1931)	Charles A. Christopherson (R)	Royal C. Johnson (R)	William Williamson (R)
72nd (1931–1933)	Charles A. Christopherson (R)	Royal C. Johnson (R)	William Williamson (R)
73rd (1933–1935)	Fred H. Hildebrandt (D)	Theodore B. Werner (D)	
74th (1935–1937)	Fred H. Hildebrandt (D)	Theodore B. Werner (D)	
75th (1937–1939)	Fred H. Hildebrandt (D)	Francis Case (R)	
76th (1939–1941)	Karl Mundt (R)	Francis Case (R)	
77th (1941–1943)	Karl Mundt (R)	Francis Case (R)	
78th (1943–1945)	Karl Mundt (R)	Francis Case (R)	
79th (1945–1947)	Karl Mundt (R)	Francis Case (R)	
80th (1947–1949)	Karl Mundt (R)	Francis Case (R)	
81st (1949–1951)	Harold Lovre (R)	Francis Case (R)	
82nd (1951–1953)	Harold Lovre (R)	E. Y. Berry (R)	
83rd (1953–1955)	Harold Lovre (R)	E. Y. Berry (R)	
84th (1955–1957)	Harold Lovre (R)	E. Y. Berry (R)	
85th (1957–1959)	George McGovern (D)	E. Y. Berry (R)	
86th (1959–1961)	George McGovern (D)	E. Y. Berry (R)	
87th (1961–1963)	Ben Reifel (R)	E. Y. Berry (R)	
88th (1963–1965)	Ben Reifel (R)	E. Y. Berry (R)	
89th (1965–1967)	Ben Reifel (R)	E. Y. Berry (R)	
90th (1967–1969)	Ben Reifel (R)	E. Y. Berry (R)	
91st (1969–1971)	Ben Reifel (R)	E. Y. Berry (R)	
92nd (1971–1973)	Frank E. Denholm (D)	James Abourezk (D)	
93rd (1973–1975)	Frank E. Denholm (D)	James Abdnor (R)	
94th (1975–1977)	Larry Pressler (R)	James Abdnor (R)	
95th (1977–1979)	Larry Pressler (R)	James Abdnor (R)	
96th (1979–1981)	Tom Daschle (D)	James Abdnor (R)	
97th (1981–1983)	Tom Daschle (D)	Clint Roberts (R)	

=== 1983–present: elected at-large ===
Congress	At-large seat
98th (1983–1985)	Tom Daschle (D)
99th (1985–1987)	Tom Daschle (D)
100th (1987–1989)	Tim Johnson (D)
101st (1989–1991)	Tim Johnson (D)
102nd (1991–1993)	Tim Johnson (D)
103rd (1993–1995)	Tim Johnson (D)
104th (1995–1997)	Tim Johnson (D)
105th (1997–1999)	John Thune (R)
106th (1999–2001)	John Thune (R)
107th (2001–2003)	John Thune (R)
108th (2003–2005)	Bill Janklow (R)
108th (2003–2005)	Stephanie Herseth; Sandlin (D)
109th (2005–2007)	Stephanie Herseth; Sandlin (D)
110th (2007–2009)	Stephanie Herseth; Sandlin (D)
111th (2009–2011)	Stephanie Herseth; Sandlin (D)
112th (2011–2013)	Kristi Noem (R)
113th (2013–2015)	Kristi Noem (R)
114th (2015–2017)	Kristi Noem (R)
115th (2017–2019)	Kristi Noem (R)
116th (2019-2021)	Dusty Johnson (R)
117th (2021-2023)	Dusty Johnson (R)
118th (2023-2025)	Dusty Johnson (R)
119th (2025-2027)	Dusty Johnson (R)
120th (2027-2029)	Marty Jackley (R)

== Key ==
Democratic (D)
Populist (Pop)
Republican (R)
Silver Republican (SvR)
Independent (I)

== See also ==
- List of United States congressional districts
- South Dakota's congressional districts
- Political party strength in South Dakota
