= List of United States senators from South Dakota =

Current delegation

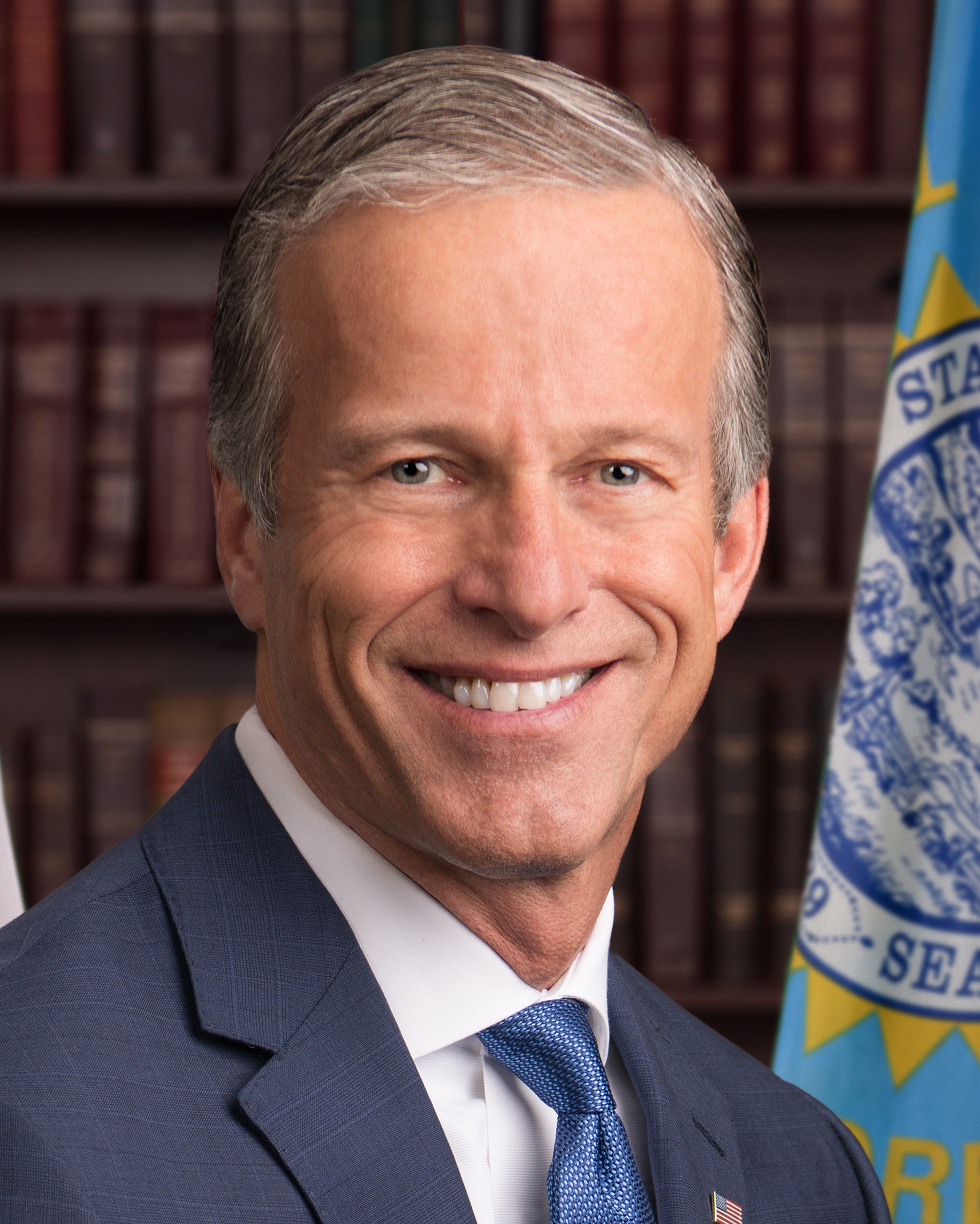
John Thune (R)

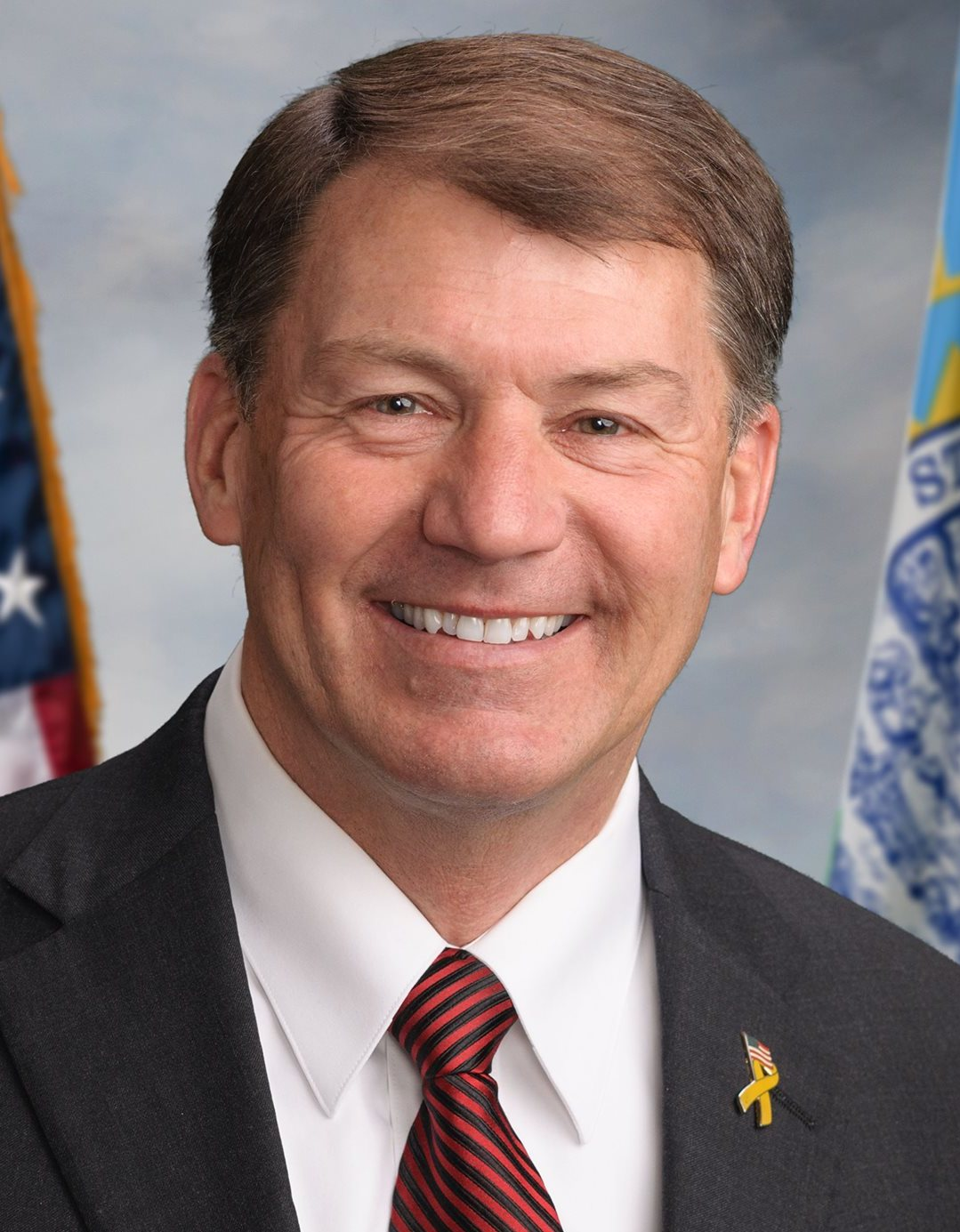
Mike Rounds (R)

(ordered by seniority)

South Dakota was admitted to the Union on November 2, 1889, and elects U.S. senators to class 2 and class 3. Its current U.S. senators are Republicans John Thune (since 2005) and Mike Rounds (since 2015). Karl E. Mundt is South Dakota's longest-serving senator (1948–1973). South Dakota's class 3 seat also holds the distinction of having a future Senate majority leader (John Thune) defeat and succeed a former majority leader (Tom Daschle).

== List of senators ==
Class 2 Class 2 senators belong to the electoral cycle that most recently had regular elections in 2008, 2014, 2020, and 2026. The next election will be in 2032.						C	Class 3 Class 3 senators belong to the electoral cycle that most recently had regular elections in 2004, 2010, 2016, and 2022. The next election will be in 2028.					
#	Senator	Party	Dates in office	Electoral history	T	C	T	Electoral history	Dates in office	Party	Senator	#
1	Richard Pettigrew (Sioux Falls)	Republican	Nov 2, 1889 – Mar 3, 1901	Elected in 1889.	1	51st	1	Elected in 1889. Lost re-election.	Nov 2, 1889 – Mar 3, 1891	Republican	Gideon C. Moody (Deadwood)	1
1	Richard Pettigrew (Sioux Falls)	Republican	Nov 2, 1889 – Mar 3, 1901	Elected in 1889.	1	52nd	2	Elected in 1891.	Mar 4, 1891 – Jul 1, 1901	Independent	James H. Kyle (Aberdeen)	2
1	Richard Pettigrew (Sioux Falls)	Republican	Nov 2, 1889 – Mar 3, 1901	Elected in 1889.	1	53rd	2	Elected in 1891.	Mar 4, 1891 – Jul 1, 1901	Populist	James H. Kyle (Aberdeen)	2
1	Richard Pettigrew (Sioux Falls)	Republican	Nov 2, 1889 – Mar 3, 1901	Re-elected in 1894. Lost re-election.	2	54th	2	Elected in 1891.	Mar 4, 1891 – Jul 1, 1901	Populist	James H. Kyle (Aberdeen)	2
1	Richard Pettigrew (Sioux Falls)	Silver; Republican	Nov 2, 1889 – Mar 3, 1901	Re-elected in 1894. Lost re-election.	2	55th	3	Re-elected in 1897. Died.	Mar 4, 1891 – Jul 1, 1901	Populist	James H. Kyle (Aberdeen)	2
1	Richard Pettigrew (Sioux Falls)	Silver; Republican	Nov 2, 1889 – Mar 3, 1901	Re-elected in 1894. Lost re-election.	2	56th	3	Re-elected in 1897. Died.	Mar 4, 1891 – Jul 1, 1901	Populist	James H. Kyle (Aberdeen)	2
2	Robert J. Gamble (Yankton)	Republican	Mar 4, 1901 – Mar 3, 1913	Elected in 1901.	3	57th	3	Re-elected in 1897. Died.	Mar 4, 1891 – Jul 1, 1901	Republican	James H. Kyle (Aberdeen)	2
2	Robert J. Gamble (Yankton)	Republican	Mar 4, 1901 – Mar 3, 1913	Elected in 1901.	3	57th	3		Jul 1, 1901 – Jul 11, 1901	Vacant		
2	Robert J. Gamble (Yankton)	Republican	Mar 4, 1901 – Mar 3, 1913	Elected in 1901.	3	57th	3	Appointed to continue Kyle's term. Elected in 1903 to finish Kyle's term.	Jul 11, 1901 – Mar 3, 1909	Republican	Alfred B. Kittredge (Sioux Falls)	3
2	Robert J. Gamble (Yankton)	Republican	Mar 4, 1901 – Mar 3, 1913	Elected in 1901.	3	58th	4	Elected to a full term in 1903. Lost renomination.	Jul 11, 1901 – Mar 3, 1909	Republican	Alfred B. Kittredge (Sioux Falls)	3
2	Robert J. Gamble (Yankton)	Republican	Mar 4, 1901 – Mar 3, 1913	Elected in 1901.	3	59th	4	Elected to a full term in 1903. Lost renomination.	Jul 11, 1901 – Mar 3, 1909	Republican	Alfred B. Kittredge (Sioux Falls)	3
2	Robert J. Gamble (Yankton)	Republican	Mar 4, 1901 – Mar 3, 1913	Re-elected in 1907. Lost renomination.	4	60th	4	Elected to a full term in 1903. Lost renomination.	Jul 11, 1901 – Mar 3, 1909	Republican	Alfred B. Kittredge (Sioux Falls)	3
2	Robert J. Gamble (Yankton)	Republican	Mar 4, 1901 – Mar 3, 1913	Re-elected in 1907. Lost renomination.	4	61st	5	Elected in 1909. Lost renomination.	Mar 4, 1909 – Mar 3, 1915	Republican	Coe Crawford (Huron)	4
2	Robert J. Gamble (Yankton)	Republican	Mar 4, 1901 – Mar 3, 1913	Re-elected in 1907. Lost renomination.	4	62nd	5	Elected in 1909. Lost renomination.	Mar 4, 1909 – Mar 3, 1915	Republican	Coe Crawford (Huron)	4
3	Thomas Sterling (Vermillion)	Republican	Mar 4, 1913 – Mar 3, 1925	Elected in 1913.	5	63rd	5	Elected in 1909. Lost renomination.	Mar 4, 1909 – Mar 3, 1915	Republican	Coe Crawford (Huron)	4
3	Thomas Sterling (Vermillion)	Republican	Mar 4, 1913 – Mar 3, 1925	Elected in 1913.	5	64th	6	Elected in 1914. Retired.	Mar 4, 1915 – Mar 3, 1921	Democratic	Edwin S. Johnson (Yankton)	5
3	Thomas Sterling (Vermillion)	Republican	Mar 4, 1913 – Mar 3, 1925	Elected in 1913.	5	65th	6	Elected in 1914. Retired.	Mar 4, 1915 – Mar 3, 1921	Democratic	Edwin S. Johnson (Yankton)	5
3	Thomas Sterling (Vermillion)	Republican	Mar 4, 1913 – Mar 3, 1925	Re-elected in 1918. Lost renomination.	6	66th	6	Elected in 1914. Retired.	Mar 4, 1915 – Mar 3, 1921	Democratic	Edwin S. Johnson (Yankton)	5
3	Thomas Sterling (Vermillion)	Republican	Mar 4, 1913 – Mar 3, 1925	Re-elected in 1918. Lost renomination.	6	67th	7	Elected in 1920.	Mar 4, 1921 – Dec 20, 1936	Republican	Peter Norbeck (Redfield)	6
3	Thomas Sterling (Vermillion)	Republican	Mar 4, 1913 – Mar 3, 1925	Re-elected in 1918. Lost renomination.	6	68th	7	Elected in 1920.	Mar 4, 1921 – Dec 20, 1936	Republican	Peter Norbeck (Redfield)	6
4	William McMaster (Yankton)	Republican	Mar 4, 1925 – Mar 3, 1931	Elected in 1924. Lost re-election.	7	69th	7	Elected in 1920.	Mar 4, 1921 – Dec 20, 1936	Republican	Peter Norbeck (Redfield)	6
4	William McMaster (Yankton)	Republican	Mar 4, 1925 – Mar 3, 1931	Elected in 1924. Lost re-election.	7	70th	8	Re-elected in 1926.	Mar 4, 1921 – Dec 20, 1936	Republican	Peter Norbeck (Redfield)	6
4	William McMaster (Yankton)	Republican	Mar 4, 1925 – Mar 3, 1931	Elected in 1924. Lost re-election.	7	71st	8	Re-elected in 1926.	Mar 4, 1921 – Dec 20, 1936	Republican	Peter Norbeck (Redfield)	6
5	William J. Bulow (Beresford)	Democratic	Mar 4, 1931 – Jan 3, 1943	Elected in 1930.	8	72nd	8	Re-elected in 1926.	Mar 4, 1921 – Dec 20, 1936	Republican	Peter Norbeck (Redfield)	6
5	William J. Bulow (Beresford)	Democratic	Mar 4, 1931 – Jan 3, 1943	Elected in 1930.	8	73rd	9	Re-elected in 1932. Died.	Mar 4, 1921 – Dec 20, 1936	Republican	Peter Norbeck (Redfield)	6
5	William J. Bulow (Beresford)	Democratic	Mar 4, 1931 – Jan 3, 1943	Elected in 1930.	8	74th	9	Re-elected in 1932. Died.	Mar 4, 1921 – Dec 20, 1936	Republican	Peter Norbeck (Redfield)	6
5	William J. Bulow (Beresford)	Democratic	Mar 4, 1931 – Jan 3, 1943	Elected in 1930.	8	74th	9		Dec 20, 1936 – Dec 29, 1936	Vacant		
5	William J. Bulow (Beresford)	Democratic	Mar 4, 1931 – Jan 3, 1943	Elected in 1930.	8	74th	9	Appointed to continue Norbeck's term. Lost nomination to a full term.	Dec 29, 1936 – Nov 8, 1938	Democratic	Herbert Hitchcock (Mitchell)	7
5	William J. Bulow (Beresford)	Democratic	Mar 4, 1931 – Jan 3, 1943	Re-elected in 1936. Lost renomination.	9	75th	9	Appointed to continue Norbeck's term. Lost nomination to a full term.	Dec 29, 1936 – Nov 8, 1938	Democratic	Herbert Hitchcock (Mitchell)	7
5	William J. Bulow (Beresford)	Democratic	Mar 4, 1931 – Jan 3, 1943	Re-elected in 1936. Lost renomination.	9	75th	9	Elected to finish Norbeck's term. Retired.	Nov 9, 1938 – Jan 3, 1939	Republican	Gladys Pyle (Huron)	8
5	William J. Bulow (Beresford)	Democratic	Mar 4, 1931 – Jan 3, 1943	Re-elected in 1936. Lost renomination.	9	76th	10	Elected in 1938.	Jan 3, 1939 – Jan 3, 1951	Republican	Chan Gurney (Yankton)	9
5	William J. Bulow (Beresford)	Democratic	Mar 4, 1931 – Jan 3, 1943	Re-elected in 1936. Lost renomination.	9	77th	10	Elected in 1938.	Jan 3, 1939 – Jan 3, 1951	Republican	Chan Gurney (Yankton)	9
6	Harlan J. Bushfield (Miller)	Republican	Jan 3, 1943 – Sep 27, 1948	Elected in 1942. Died.	10	78th	10	Elected in 1938.	Jan 3, 1939 – Jan 3, 1951	Republican	Chan Gurney (Yankton)	9
6	Harlan J. Bushfield (Miller)	Republican	Jan 3, 1943 – Sep 27, 1948	Elected in 1942. Died.	10	79th	11	Re-elected in 1944. Lost renomination.	Jan 3, 1939 – Jan 3, 1951	Republican	Chan Gurney (Yankton)	9
6	Harlan J. Bushfield (Miller)	Republican	Jan 3, 1943 – Sep 27, 1948	Elected in 1942. Died.	10	80th	11	Re-elected in 1944. Lost renomination.	Jan 3, 1939 – Jan 3, 1951	Republican	Chan Gurney (Yankton)	9
Vacant			Sep 27, 1948 – Oct 6, 1948		10	80th	11	Re-elected in 1944. Lost renomination.	Jan 3, 1939 – Jan 3, 1951	Republican	Chan Gurney (Yankton)	9
7	Vera C. Bushfield (Miller)	Republican	Oct 6, 1948 – Dec 26, 1948	Appointed to finish her husband's term. Resigned when successor appointed.	10	80th	11	Re-elected in 1944. Lost renomination.	Jan 3, 1939 – Jan 3, 1951	Republican	Chan Gurney (Yankton)	9
Vacant			Dec 26, 1948 – Dec 31, 1948		10	80th	11	Re-elected in 1944. Lost renomination.	Jan 3, 1939 – Jan 3, 1951	Republican	Chan Gurney (Yankton)	9
8	Karl Mundt (Madison)	Republican	Dec 31, 1948 – Jan 3, 1973	Appointed to finish Bushfield's term, having been elected to the next term.	10	80th	11	Re-elected in 1944. Lost renomination.	Jan 3, 1939 – Jan 3, 1951	Republican	Chan Gurney (Yankton)	9
8	Karl Mundt (Madison)	Republican	Dec 31, 1948 – Jan 3, 1973	Elected in 1948	11	81st	11	Re-elected in 1944. Lost renomination.	Jan 3, 1939 – Jan 3, 1951	Republican	Chan Gurney (Yankton)	9
8	Karl Mundt (Madison)	Republican	Dec 31, 1948 – Jan 3, 1973	Elected in 1948	11	82nd	12	Elected in 1950.	Jan 3, 1951 – Jun 22, 1962	Republican	Francis Case (Custer)	10
8	Karl Mundt (Madison)	Republican	Dec 31, 1948 – Jan 3, 1973	Elected in 1948	11	83rd	12	Elected in 1950.	Jan 3, 1951 – Jun 22, 1962	Republican	Francis Case (Custer)	10
8	Karl Mundt (Madison)	Republican	Dec 31, 1948 – Jan 3, 1973	Re-elected in 1954.	12	84th	12	Elected in 1950.	Jan 3, 1951 – Jun 22, 1962	Republican	Francis Case (Custer)	10
8	Karl Mundt (Madison)	Republican	Dec 31, 1948 – Jan 3, 1973	Re-elected in 1954.	12	85th	13	Re-elected in 1956. Died.	Jan 3, 1951 – Jun 22, 1962	Republican	Francis Case (Custer)	10
8	Karl Mundt (Madison)	Republican	Dec 31, 1948 – Jan 3, 1973	Re-elected in 1954.	12	86th	13	Re-elected in 1956. Died.	Jan 3, 1951 – Jun 22, 1962	Republican	Francis Case (Custer)	10
8	Karl Mundt (Madison)	Republican	Dec 31, 1948 – Jan 3, 1973	Re-elected in 1960.	13	87th	13	Re-elected in 1956. Died.	Jan 3, 1951 – Jun 22, 1962	Republican	Francis Case (Custer)	10
8	Karl Mundt (Madison)	Republican	Dec 31, 1948 – Jan 3, 1973	Re-elected in 1960.	13	87th	13		Jun 22, 1962 – Jul 9, 1962	Vacant		
8	Karl Mundt (Madison)	Republican	Dec 31, 1948 – Jan 3, 1973	Re-elected in 1960.	13	87th	13	Appointed to finish Case's term. Lost election to full term.	Jul 9, 1962 – Jan 3, 1963	Republican	Joe Bottum (Rapid City)	11
8	Karl Mundt (Madison)	Republican	Dec 31, 1948 – Jan 3, 1973	Re-elected in 1960.	13	88th	14	Elected in 1962.	Jan 3, 1963 – Jan 3, 1981	Democratic	George McGovern (Mitchell)	12
8	Karl Mundt (Madison)	Republican	Dec 31, 1948 – Jan 3, 1973	Re-elected in 1960.	13	89th	14	Elected in 1962.	Jan 3, 1963 – Jan 3, 1981	Democratic	George McGovern (Mitchell)	12
8	Karl Mundt (Madison)	Republican	Dec 31, 1948 – Jan 3, 1973	Re-elected in 1966. Retired.	14	90th	14	Elected in 1962.	Jan 3, 1963 – Jan 3, 1981	Democratic	George McGovern (Mitchell)	12
8	Karl Mundt (Madison)	Republican	Dec 31, 1948 – Jan 3, 1973	Re-elected in 1966. Retired.	14	91st	15	Re-elected in 1968.	Jan 3, 1963 – Jan 3, 1981	Democratic	George McGovern (Mitchell)	12
8	Karl Mundt (Madison)	Republican	Dec 31, 1948 – Jan 3, 1973	Re-elected in 1966. Retired.	14	92nd	15	Re-elected in 1968.	Jan 3, 1963 – Jan 3, 1981	Democratic	George McGovern (Mitchell)	12
9	James Abourezk (Rapid City)	Democratic	Jan 3, 1973 – Jan 3, 1979	Elected in 1972. Retired.	15	93rd	15	Re-elected in 1968.	Jan 3, 1963 – Jan 3, 1981	Democratic	George McGovern (Mitchell)	12
9	James Abourezk (Rapid City)	Democratic	Jan 3, 1973 – Jan 3, 1979	Elected in 1972. Retired.	15	94th	16	Re-elected in 1974. Lost re-election.	Jan 3, 1963 – Jan 3, 1981	Democratic	George McGovern (Mitchell)	12
9	James Abourezk (Rapid City)	Democratic	Jan 3, 1973 – Jan 3, 1979	Elected in 1972. Retired.	15	95th	16	Re-elected in 1974. Lost re-election.	Jan 3, 1963 – Jan 3, 1981	Democratic	George McGovern (Mitchell)	12
10	Larry Pressler (Humboldt)	Republican	Jan 3, 1979 – Jan 3, 1997	Elected in 1978.	16	96th	16	Re-elected in 1974. Lost re-election.	Jan 3, 1963 – Jan 3, 1981	Democratic	George McGovern (Mitchell)	12
10	Larry Pressler (Humboldt)	Republican	Jan 3, 1979 – Jan 3, 1997	Elected in 1978.	16	97th	17	Elected in 1980. Lost re-election.	Jan 3, 1981 – Jan 3, 1987	Republican	James Abdnor (Kennebec)	13
10	Larry Pressler (Humboldt)	Republican	Jan 3, 1979 – Jan 3, 1997	Elected in 1978.	16	98th	17	Elected in 1980. Lost re-election.	Jan 3, 1981 – Jan 3, 1987	Republican	James Abdnor (Kennebec)	13
10	Larry Pressler (Humboldt)	Republican	Jan 3, 1979 – Jan 3, 1997	Re-elected in 1984.	17	99th	17	Elected in 1980. Lost re-election.	Jan 3, 1981 – Jan 3, 1987	Republican	James Abdnor (Kennebec)	13
10	Larry Pressler (Humboldt)	Republican	Jan 3, 1979 – Jan 3, 1997	Re-elected in 1984.	17	100th	18	Elected in 1986.	Jan 3, 1987 – Jan 3, 2005	Democratic	Tom Daschle (Aberdeen)	14
10	Larry Pressler (Humboldt)	Republican	Jan 3, 1979 – Jan 3, 1997	Re-elected in 1984.	17	101st	18	Elected in 1986.	Jan 3, 1987 – Jan 3, 2005	Democratic	Tom Daschle (Aberdeen)	14
10	Larry Pressler (Humboldt)	Republican	Jan 3, 1979 – Jan 3, 1997	Re-elected in 1990. Lost re-election.	18	102nd	18	Elected in 1986.	Jan 3, 1987 – Jan 3, 2005	Democratic	Tom Daschle (Aberdeen)	14
10	Larry Pressler (Humboldt)	Republican	Jan 3, 1979 – Jan 3, 1997	Re-elected in 1990. Lost re-election.	18	103rd	19	Re-elected in 1992.	Jan 3, 1987 – Jan 3, 2005	Democratic	Tom Daschle (Aberdeen)	14
10	Larry Pressler (Humboldt)	Republican	Jan 3, 1979 – Jan 3, 1997	Re-elected in 1990. Lost re-election.	18	104th	19	Re-elected in 1992.	Jan 3, 1987 – Jan 3, 2005	Democratic	Tom Daschle (Aberdeen)	14
11	Tim Johnson (Vermillion)	Democratic	Jan 3, 1997 – Jan 3, 2015	Elected in 1996.	19	105th	19	Re-elected in 1992.	Jan 3, 1987 – Jan 3, 2005	Democratic	Tom Daschle (Aberdeen)	14
11	Tim Johnson (Vermillion)	Democratic	Jan 3, 1997 – Jan 3, 2015	Elected in 1996.	19	106th	20	Re-elected in 1998. Lost re-election.	Jan 3, 1987 – Jan 3, 2005	Democratic	Tom Daschle (Aberdeen)	14
11	Tim Johnson (Vermillion)	Democratic	Jan 3, 1997 – Jan 3, 2015	Elected in 1996.	19	107th	20	Re-elected in 1998. Lost re-election.	Jan 3, 1987 – Jan 3, 2005	Democratic	Tom Daschle (Aberdeen)	14
11	Tim Johnson (Vermillion)	Democratic	Jan 3, 1997 – Jan 3, 2015	Re-elected in 2002.	20	108th	20	Re-elected in 1998. Lost re-election.	Jan 3, 1987 – Jan 3, 2005	Democratic	Tom Daschle (Aberdeen)	14
11	Tim Johnson (Vermillion)	Democratic	Jan 3, 1997 – Jan 3, 2015	Re-elected in 2002.	20	109th	21	Elected in 2004.	Jan 3, 2005 – present	Republican	John Thune (Sioux Falls)	15
11	Tim Johnson (Vermillion)	Democratic	Jan 3, 1997 – Jan 3, 2015	Re-elected in 2002.	20	110th	21	Elected in 2004.	Jan 3, 2005 – present	Republican	John Thune (Sioux Falls)	15
11	Tim Johnson (Vermillion)	Democratic	Jan 3, 1997 – Jan 3, 2015	Re-elected in 2008. Retired.	21	111th	21	Elected in 2004.	Jan 3, 2005 – present	Republican	John Thune (Sioux Falls)	15
11	Tim Johnson (Vermillion)	Democratic	Jan 3, 1997 – Jan 3, 2015	Re-elected in 2008. Retired.	21	112th	22	Re-elected in 2010.	Jan 3, 2005 – present	Republican	John Thune (Sioux Falls)	15
11	Tim Johnson (Vermillion)	Democratic	Jan 3, 1997 – Jan 3, 2015	Re-elected in 2008. Retired.	21	113th	22	Re-elected in 2010.	Jan 3, 2005 – present	Republican	John Thune (Sioux Falls)	15
12	Mike Rounds (Fort Pierre)	Republican	Jan 3, 2015 – present	Elected in 2014.	22	114th	22	Re-elected in 2010.	Jan 3, 2005 – present	Republican	John Thune (Sioux Falls)	15
12	Mike Rounds (Fort Pierre)	Republican	Jan 3, 2015 – present	Elected in 2014.	22	115th	23	Re-elected in 2016.	Jan 3, 2005 – present	Republican	John Thune (Sioux Falls)	15
12	Mike Rounds (Fort Pierre)	Republican	Jan 3, 2015 – present	Elected in 2014.	22	116th	23	Re-elected in 2016.	Jan 3, 2005 – present	Republican	John Thune (Sioux Falls)	15
12	Mike Rounds (Fort Pierre)	Republican	Jan 3, 2015 – present	Re-elected in 2020.	23	117th	23	Re-elected in 2016.	Jan 3, 2005 – present	Republican	John Thune (Sioux Falls)	15
12	Mike Rounds (Fort Pierre)	Republican	Jan 3, 2015 – present	Re-elected in 2020.	23	118th	24	Re-elected in 2022.	Jan 3, 2005 – present	Republican	John Thune (Sioux Falls)	15
12	Mike Rounds (Fort Pierre)	Republican	Jan 3, 2015 – present	Re-elected in 2020.	23	119th	24	Re-elected in 2022.	Jan 3, 2005 – present	Republican	John Thune (Sioux Falls)	15
12	Mike Rounds (Fort Pierre)	Republican	Jan 3, 2015 – present	Re-elected in 2026.	24	120th	24	Re-elected in 2022.	Jan 3, 2005 – present	Republican	John Thune (Sioux Falls)	15
12	Mike Rounds (Fort Pierre)	Republican	Jan 3, 2015 – present	Re-elected in 2026.	24	121st	25	To be determined in the 2028 election.				
12	Mike Rounds (Fort Pierre)	Republican	Jan 3, 2015 – present	Re-elected in 2026.	24	122nd	25	To be determined in the 2028 election.				
To be determined in the 2032 election.					25	123rd	25	To be determined in the 2028 election.				

== See also ==
- Elections in South Dakota
- List of United States representatives from South Dakota
- South Dakota's congressional delegations
