= 1950 United States Senate election in South Dakota =

- November 7, 1950
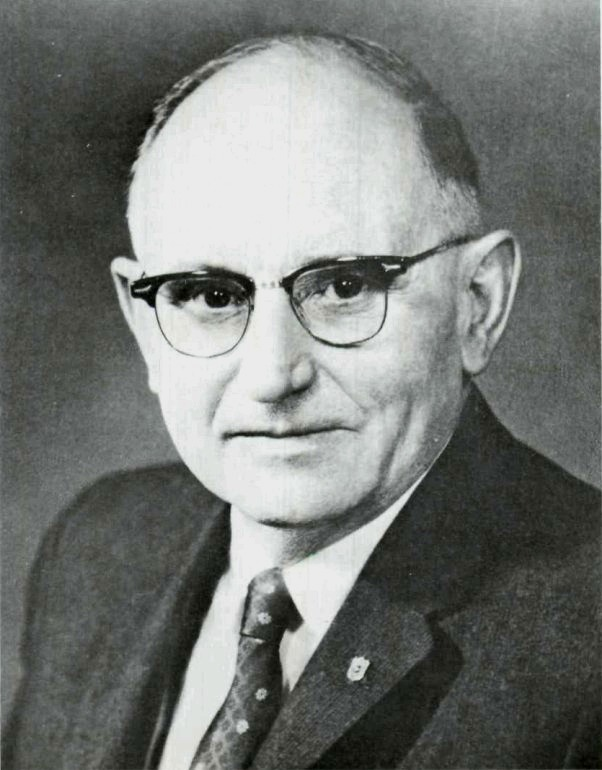

Nominee	Francis Case	John A. Engel
Party	Republican	Democratic
Popular vote	160,670	90,692
Percentage	63.92%	36.08%
- County results Case: 50–60% 60–70% 70–80% 80–90% Engel: 50–60% 70–80%
U.S. senator before election
Chan Gurney
Republican
Elected U.S. Senator
Francis Case
Republican

The 1950 United States Senate election in South Dakota took place on November 7, 1950. Incumbent Republican senator Chan Gurney ran for re-election to a third term. He was challenged in the Republican primary by Congressman Francis H. Case, who had represented the 2nd District since 1939. In the general election, Case faced John A. Engel, an attorney and the 1948 Democratic nominee for the U.S. Senate. As the Republican Party was making significant gains nationwide, Case defeated Engel in a landslide.

== Democratic primary ==
=== Candidates ===
- John A. Engel, attorney, 1948 Democratic nominee for the U.S. Senate
- John S. Tschetter, Mayor of Huron

=== Results ===
Democratic primary
Party	Candidate	Votes	%
Democratic	John A. Engel	18,944	59.11%
Democratic	John S. Tschetter	13,104	40.89%
Total votes		32,048	100.00%

== Republican primary ==
=== Candidates ===
- Francis H. Case, U.S. Congressman from South Dakota's 2nd congressional district
- Chan Gurney, incumbent U.S. Senator

=== Results ===
Republican primary
Party	Candidate	Votes	%
Republican	Francis H. Case	59,314	58.07%
Republican	Chan Gurney (inc.)	42,823	41.93%
Total votes		102,137	100.00%

== General election ==
=== Results ===
1950 United States Senate election in South Dakota
Party	Candidate	Votes	%	±%
Republican	Francis H. Case	160,670	63.92%	+0.06%
Democratic	John A. Engel	90,692	36.08%	−0.06%
Majority		69,978	27.84%	+0.12%
Turnout		251,352		
Republican hold				
