= Karl Mundt Library =

Academic library in Madison, South Dakota

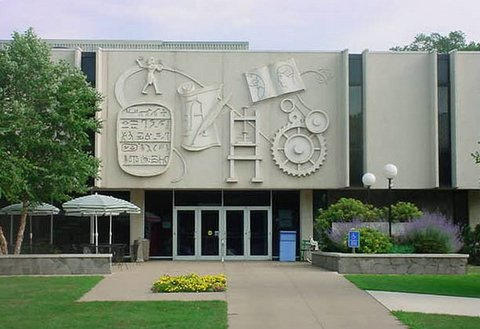
- 44.012515°N 97.109732°W
- Location: Madison, South Dakota, United States
- Type: Academic
- Established: 1968

Other information
- Director: Mary Francis
- Website: https://library.dsu.edu/main

The Karl Mundt Library is a library on the campus of Dakota State University in Madison, South Dakota. It was completed in 1968.

== Namesake ==
The Karl Mundt Library was named after the former Republican senator Karl Mundt who graduated from Madison High School in Madison, South Dakota. The library is also home to the Karl E. Mundt Archives and the Karl E. Mundt Film Collection.

== Dedication ==
On June 3, 1969, General Beadle State College (now Dakota State University) held the dedication of the Karl Mundt Library. In attendance was Karl Mundt, South Dakota Governor Frank Farrar, and Richard Nixon, the 37th President of the United States. President Nixon made a speech at 2:57 p.m. in front of approximately 10,000 people. The speech would mark Nixon's first as President outside of Washington, DC.

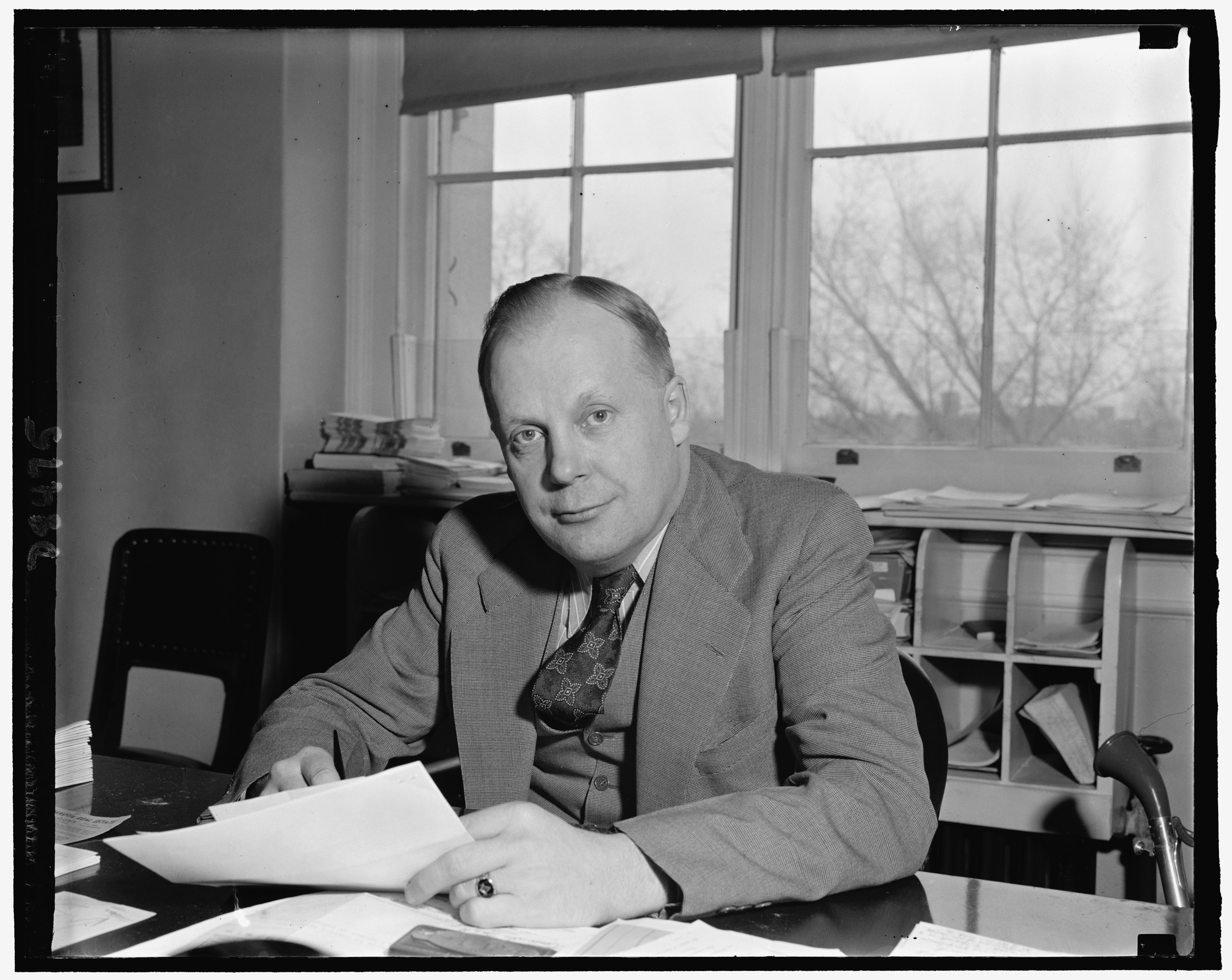
Photo of Karl Mundt
