= E. Y. Berry =

American politician (1902–1999)

Ellis Y. Berry
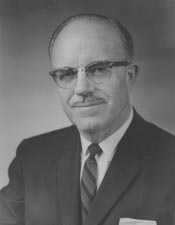

Member of the U.S. House of Representatives from South Dakota's 2nd district
- In office January 3, 1951 – January 3, 1971
- Preceded by: Francis Case
- Succeeded by: James Abourezk

Member of the South Dakota Senate
- In office 1938–1942

Personal details
- Born: Ellis Yarnal Berry; October 6, 1902 Larchwood, Iowa, U.S.
- Died: April 1, 1999 (aged 96) Rapid City, South Dakota, U.S.
- Party: Republican
- Children: Bob
- Education: Morningside College; University of South Dakota School of Law

Ellis Yarnal Berry (October 6, 1902 – April 1, 1999) was an American attorney, newspaper publisher and politician, who served in the United States House of Representatives from South Dakota. He served ten consecutive terms in office from 1951 to 1971.

== Early life and education ==
Berry was born on October 6, 1902, in Larchwood, Iowa, and graduated from Philip High School in Philip, South Dakota.

He was a student at Morningside College from 1920 to 1922. He transferred to the University of South Dakota, where he completed his undergraduate work and studied law, graduating with a law degree in 1927. He was admitted to the bar that same year under diploma privilege.

== Career ==
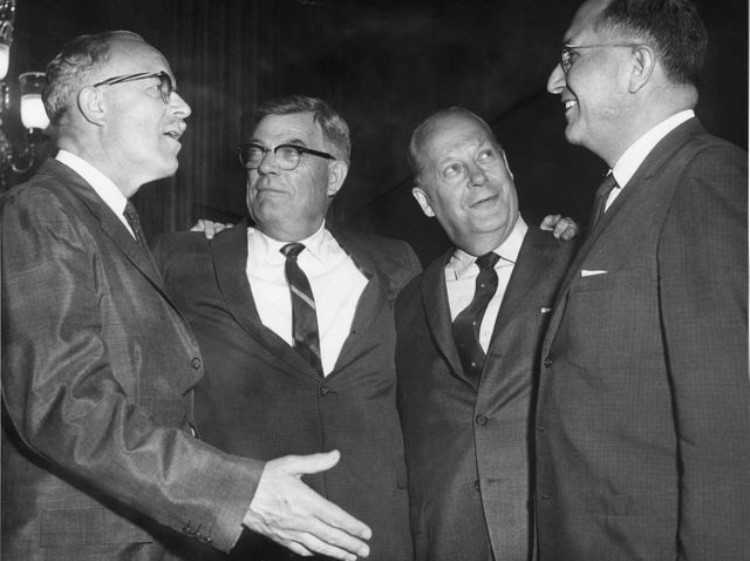
South Dakota's congressional delegation in the 87th U.S. Congress. L-R: Ellis Y. Berry, Joseph H. Bottum, Karl E. Mundt, and Ben Reifel.

Berry started his law practice in Kennebec, South Dakota; two years later, he moved to McLaughlin. He was elected as state's attorney, probate court judge for Corson County, and mayor of McLaughlin. He served as the publisher of the newspaper Mclaughlin Messenger beginning in 1938. He was editor of the State Bar Association Journal from 1938 through 1950.

=== Politics ===
Berry was elected to the South Dakota State Senate from 1938 through 1942, a total of two terms.

In 1950, Berry was elected as a Republican to the United States House of Representatives, and reelected nine consecutive times, retiring in 1971. Beginning in 1952, he also published the McIntosh News and Morristown World.

In 1966, journalist Drew Pearson reported that Berry was one of a group of four Congressmen who had received the "Statesman of the Republic" award from Liberty Lobby for their "right-wing activities". Berry voted in favor of the Civil Rights Acts of 1957, 1960, and 1968, and the Voting Rights Act of 1965, but voted against the Civil Rights Act of 1964 and 24th Amendment to the U.S. Constitution.

=== Later career and death ===
After retiring from Congress, Berry he settled in Rapid City, South Dakota. He lived there until his death on April 1, 1999, aged 96.

== Legacy and honors ==
- After retiring from Congress in 1971, he donated his papers to Black Hills State University. The Berry Collection is housed at the E. Y. Berry Library-Learning Center of Black Hills State University and consists of more than 500 boxes of manuscript materials.
- BHSU's Library-Learning Center is named for Congressman Berry.
- Congressmen Berry has been incorrectly attributed to the Berry Amendment, which was passed in 1941, before Congressmen Berry joined the house.

U.S. House of Representatives
| Preceded by Francis H. Case | Member of the U.S. House of Representatives from South Dakota's 2nd congressional district 1951–1971 | Succeeded by James Abourezk |
Honorary titles
| Preceded by Jennings Randolph | Oldest living United States representative (Sitting or former); May 8, 1998 – April 1, 1999 | Succeeded by Mike Mansfield |
