= 1992 United States Senate election in South Dakota =

- November 3, 1992
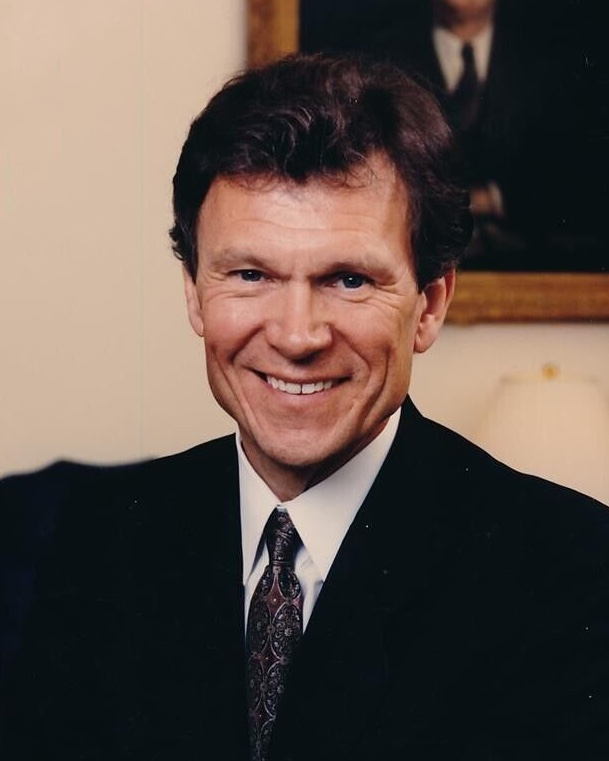

Nominee	Tom Daschle	Charlene Haar
Party	Democratic	Republican
Popular vote	217,095	108,733
Percentage	64.90%	32.51%
- County results Daschle: 40–50% 50–60% 60–70% 70–80% 80–90% Haar: 40–50%
U.S. senator before election
Tom Daschle
Democratic
Elected U.S. Senator
Tom Daschle
Democratic

The 1992 United States Senate election in South Dakota was held on November 2, 1992. Incumbent Democratic U.S. Senator Tom Daschle won re-election to a second term, winning all but one county.

== Major candidates ==
=== Democratic ===
- Tom Daschle, incumbent U.S. Senator

=== Republican ===
- Charlene Haar, educator

== Results ==
General election results
Party	Candidate	Votes	%	±%
Democratic	Tom Daschle (incumbent)	217,095	64.90%	+13.30%
Republican	Charlene Haar	108,733	32.51%	−15.89%
Libertarian	Gus Hercules	4,353	1.30%	
Independent	Kent Hyde	4,314	1.29%	
Majority		108,362	32.40%	+29.19%
Turnout		334,495		
Democratic hold		Swing		

== See also ==
- 1992 United States Senate elections
