= 1966 United States Senate election in South Dakota =

- November 8, 1966
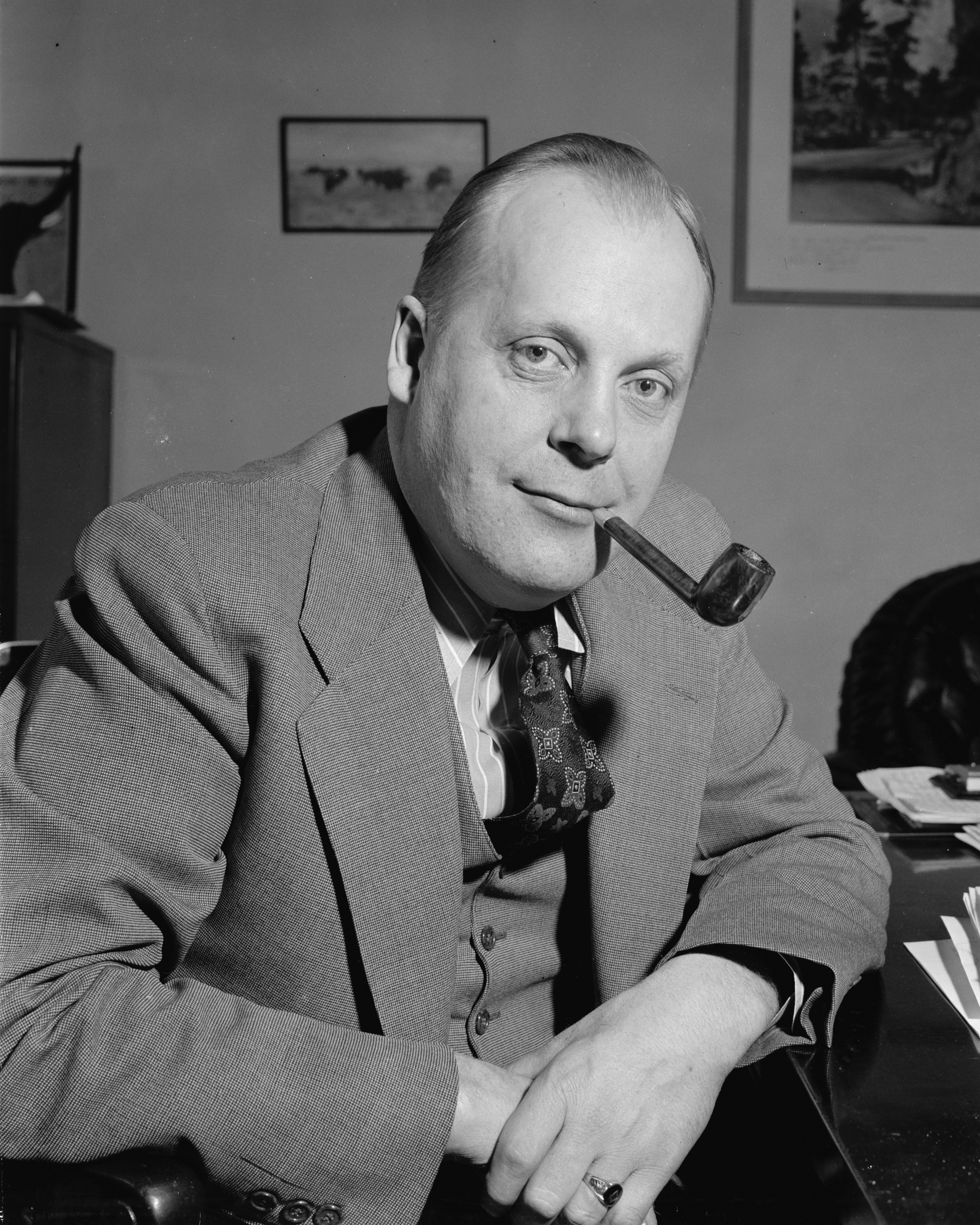

Nominee	Karl Mundt	Donn H. Wright
Party	Republican	Democratic
Popular vote	150,517	76,563
Percentage	66.28%	33.72%
- County results Mundt: 50–60% 60–70% 70–80% 80–90% Wright: 50–60%
U.S. senator before election
Karl E. Mundt
Republican
Elected U.S. Senator
Karl E. Mundt
Republican

The 1966 United States Senate election in South Dakota took place on November 8, 1966. Incumbent Republican Senator Karl E. Mundt ran for re-election to his fourth term. He was challenged in the Republican primary by a John Birch Society member, but easily turned away the challenge. In the general election, he faced State Representative Donn Wright, the Democratic nominee. Owing in large part to the Republican landslide taking place nationwide, Mundt defeated Wright by an unprecedented margin.

South Dakota would not elect another Senator to a fourth term until John Thune in 2022, it was dubbed the "Mundt curse".

== Democratic primary ==
State Representative Donn Wright from Aurora County announced that he would run against Mundt on April 18, 1966, the only Democratic candidate to do so. As Wright was the only candidate to file for the nomination, he won the primary unopposed and the race was removed from the primary election ballot.

== Republican primary ==
=== Candidates ===
- Karl E. Mundt, incumbent U.S. Senator
- Richard B. Murphy, attorney, John Birch Society member

=== Results ===
Republican primary
Party	Candidate	Votes	%
Republican	Karl E. Mundt (inc.)	66,758	82.06%
Republican	Richard B. Murphy	14,593	17.94%
Total votes		81,351	100.00%

== General election ==
=== Results ===
1966 United States Senate election in South Dakota
Party	Candidate	Votes	%	±%
Republican	Karl E. Mundt (inc.)	150,517	66.28%	+13.84%
Democratic	Donn H. Wright	76,653	33.72%	−13.84%
Majority		73,954	32.57%	+27.68%
Turnout		227,080	100.00%	
Republican hold				
