= Vera C. Bushfield =

American politician (1889–1976)

Vera Bushfield
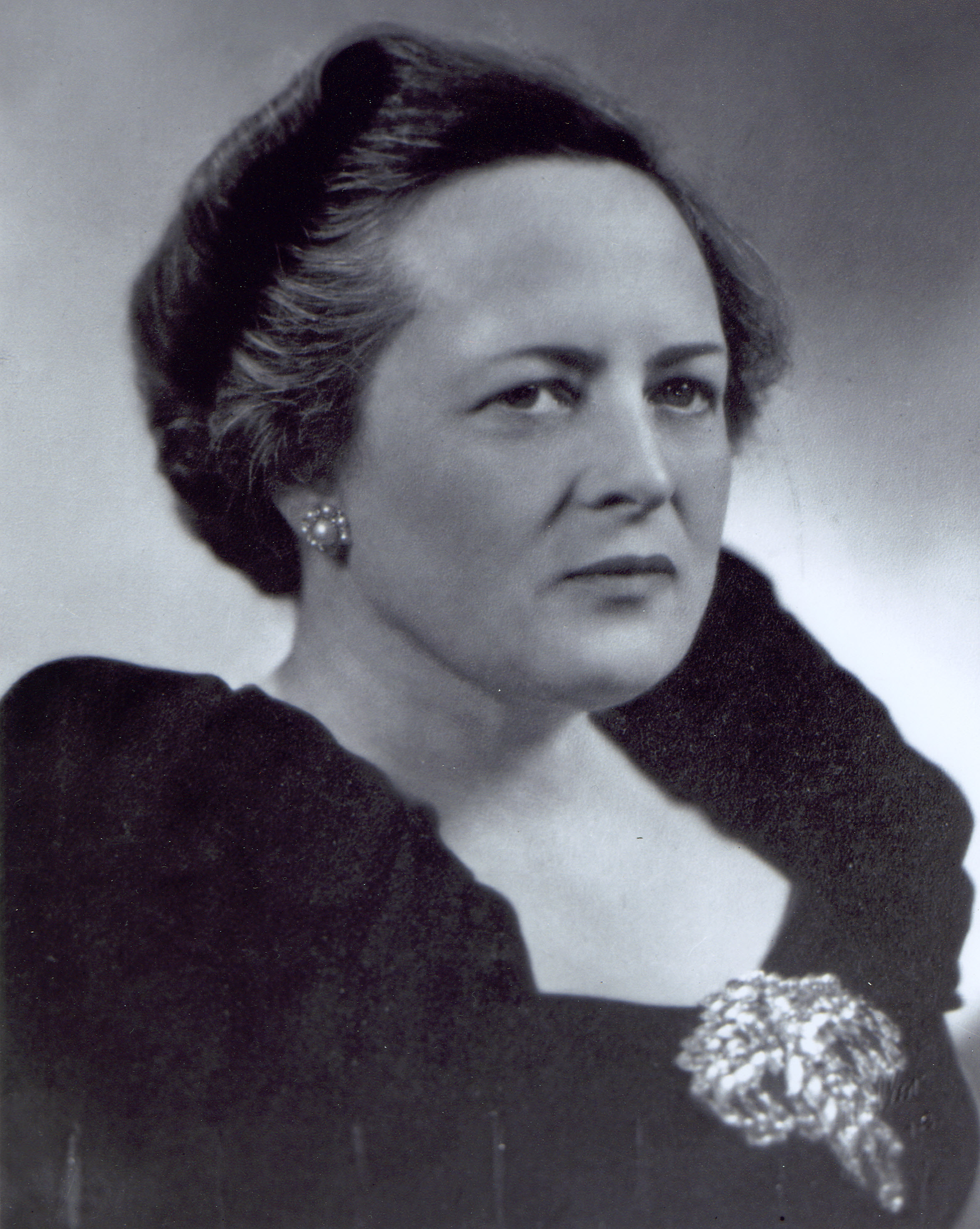

United States Senator from South Dakota
- In office October 6, 1948 – December 26, 1948
- Appointed by: George Theodore Mickelson
- Preceded by: Harlan J. Bushfield
- Succeeded by: Karl Mundt

First Lady of South Dakota
- In office January 3, 1939 – January 5, 1943
- Governor: Harlan J. Bushfield
- Preceded by: Elizabeth Ward Jensen
- Succeeded by: Emily Auld Sharpe

Personal details
- Born: Vera Sarah Cahalan; August 9, 1889 Miller, South Dakota, U.S.
- Died: April 16, 1976 (aged 86) Fort Collins, Colorado, U.S.
- Party: Republican
- Spouse: Harlan J. Bushfield (m. 1912; died 1948)
- Children: 3
- Education: University of Wisconsin, Stout (BA); Dakota Wesleyan University (attended); University of Minnesota, Twin Cities (attended)

Vera Sarah Bushfield (née Cahalan; August 9, 1889 – April 16, 1976) was an American politician served as a U.S. senator from South Dakota in 1948, as well as the First Lady of South Dakota from 1939 to 1943. Bushfield's appointment also marked the first time one state had been represented by two female senators; Gladys Pyle served for two months in late 1938 and early 1939.

== Early life ==
Vera Sarah Cahalan was born in Miller, South Dakota, on August 9, 1889, the daughter of Maurice Francis Cahalan and Mary Ellen (Conners) Cahalan. She attended the public schools of Miller and in 1912 she graduated from Menomonie, Wisconsin's Stout Institute with a degree in domestic science. In addition, Cahalan attended Dakota Wesleyan University and the University of Minnesota.

On April 15, 1912, Cahalan married Harlan J. Bushfield, who was also a resident of Miller, and the Bushfields continued to reside there. The Bushfields were the parents of three children; Mary, John, and Harlan Jr.

== First lady of South Dakota ==
Harlan Bushfield was an attorney and Republican Party official who served as Governor of South Dakota from 1939 to 1943. During his governorship, Vera Bushfield was the official sponsor of USS South Dakota (BB-57), a World War II ship launched in Camden, New Jersey on June 7, 1941.

After serving as governor, Harlan Bushfield served as a U.S. Senator beginning in 1943. Because of illness, he was not running for reelection in 1948, and he died in September. The contest to succeed him was between Republican Karl E. Mundt and Democrat John A. Engel.

== U.S. Senator ==
On October 6, 1948, Vera Bushfield was appointed to the Senate to temporarily fill the vacancy caused by her husband's death. Governor George T. Mickelson appointed her with the understanding that she would resign before the end of the term. During her tenure, the Senate was not in session, so Bushfield chose to remain in Pierre with a small staff and attend to constituent services rather than travel to Washington, D.C.

Mundt won the November election, and Bushfield resigned on December 26, 1948. Her resignation enabled Mickelson to appoint Mundt, giving him a few days of seniority over other senators elected in 1948, whose terms began in January 1949.

== Later life ==
Bushfield maintained an interest in politics. In 1952, she endorsed Senator Robert A. Taft for president. Taft lost the Republican nomination to Dwight Eisenhower, who went on to win the general election.

In 1961, Bushfield took advantage of the floor privileges granted to former senators to speak to the U.S. Senate on the 100th anniversary of the creation of Dakota Territory. After a speech by James Eastland in which he praised the career of Harlan Bushfield, Eastland yielded the floor to Senator Francis H. Case, who introduced Vera Bushfield so she could deliver her remarks.

Vera Bushfield died in Fort Collins, Colorado, on April 16, 1976. She is buried at the G.A.R. Cemetery in Miller.

== See also ==
- Women in the United States Senate

U.S. Senate
Preceded by Harlan Bushfield	United States Senator (Class 2) from South Dakota; 1948; Served alongside: Chandler Gurney	Succeeded by Karl Mundt
