= 1948 United States Senate election in South Dakota =

- November 2, 1948
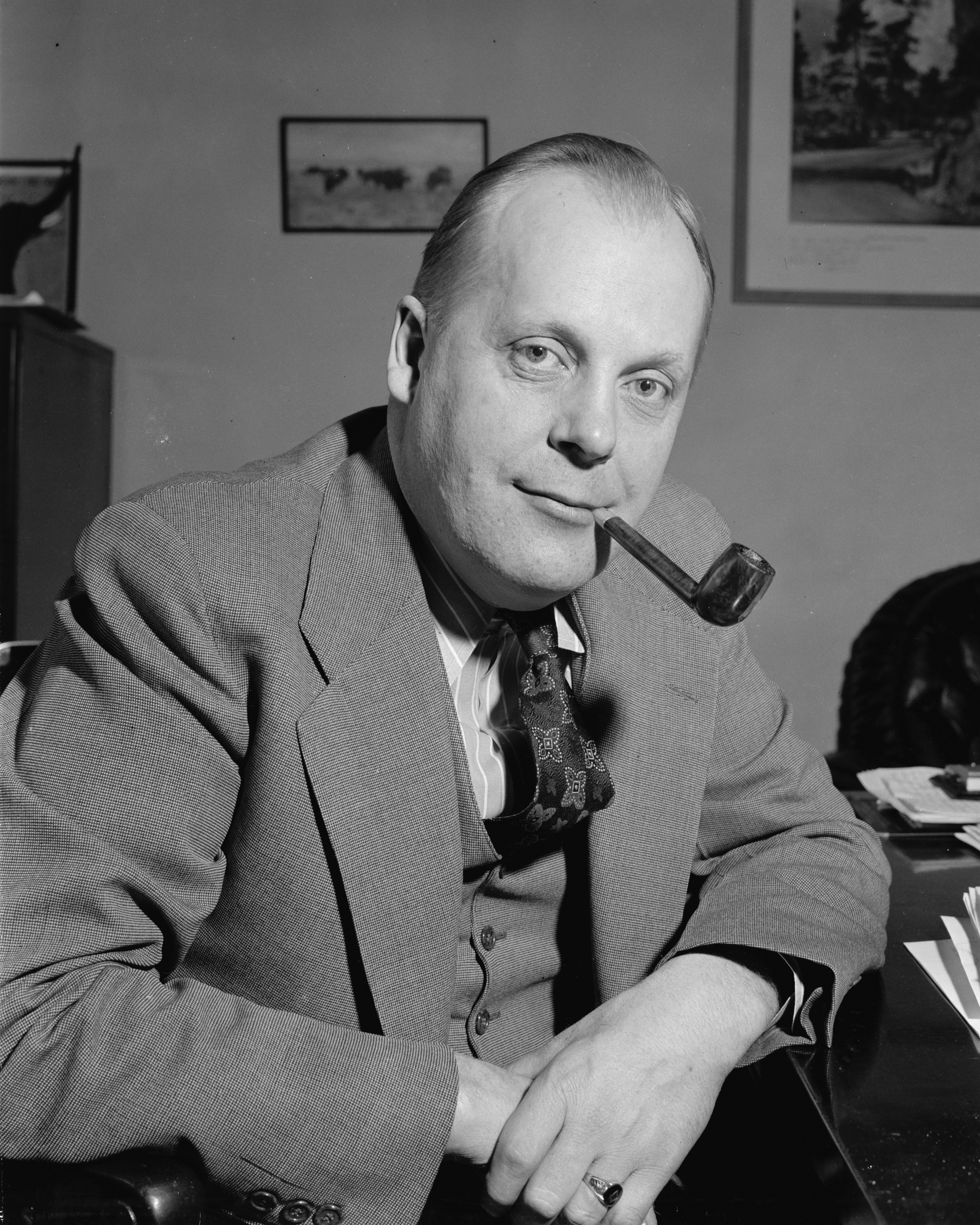

Nominee	Karl E. Mundt	John A. Engel
Party	Republican	Democratic
Popular vote	144,084	98,749
Percentage	59.33%	40.67%
- County results Mundt: 50–60% 60–70% 70–80% 80–90% Engel: 50–60% 60–70%
U.S. senator before election
Vera C. Bushfield
Republican
Elected U.S. Senator
Karl E. Mundt
Republican

The 1948 United States Senate election in South Dakota took place on November 2, 1948. Incumbent Republican Senator Harlan J. Bushfield, suffering from poor health, declined to run for re-election. On September 27, 1948, he died in office; his wife, Vera C. Bushfield, was appointed to succeed him. Congressman Karl E. Mundt easily won the Republican primary and advanced to the general election, where he was opposed by Democratic nominee John A. Engel, an attorney. Mundt defeated Engel in a landslide.

== Democratic primary ==
John A. Engel, an attorney from Avon, was the only Democratic candidate to file for the U.S. Senate and he won the nomination unopposed, thereby removing it from the primary election ballot.

== Republican primary ==
=== Candidates ===
- Karl E. Mundt, U.S. Congressman from South Dakota's 1st congressional district
- Otto B. Lindstad, State Senator, former Assistant State Attorney General

=== Results ===
Republican primary
Party	Candidate	Votes	%
Republican	Karl E. Mundt	65,595	84.51%
Republican	Otto B. Lindstad	12,022	15.49%
Total votes		77,617	100.00%

== General election ==
=== Results ===
1948 United States Senate election in South Dakota
Party	Candidate	Votes	%	±%
Republican	Karl E. Mundt	144,084	59.33%	+0.59%
Democratic	John A. Engel	98,749	40.67%	−0.59%
Majority		45,335	18.67%	+1.19%
Turnout		242,833	100.00%	
Republican hold				
