= 1954 United States Senate election in South Dakota =

- November 2, 1954
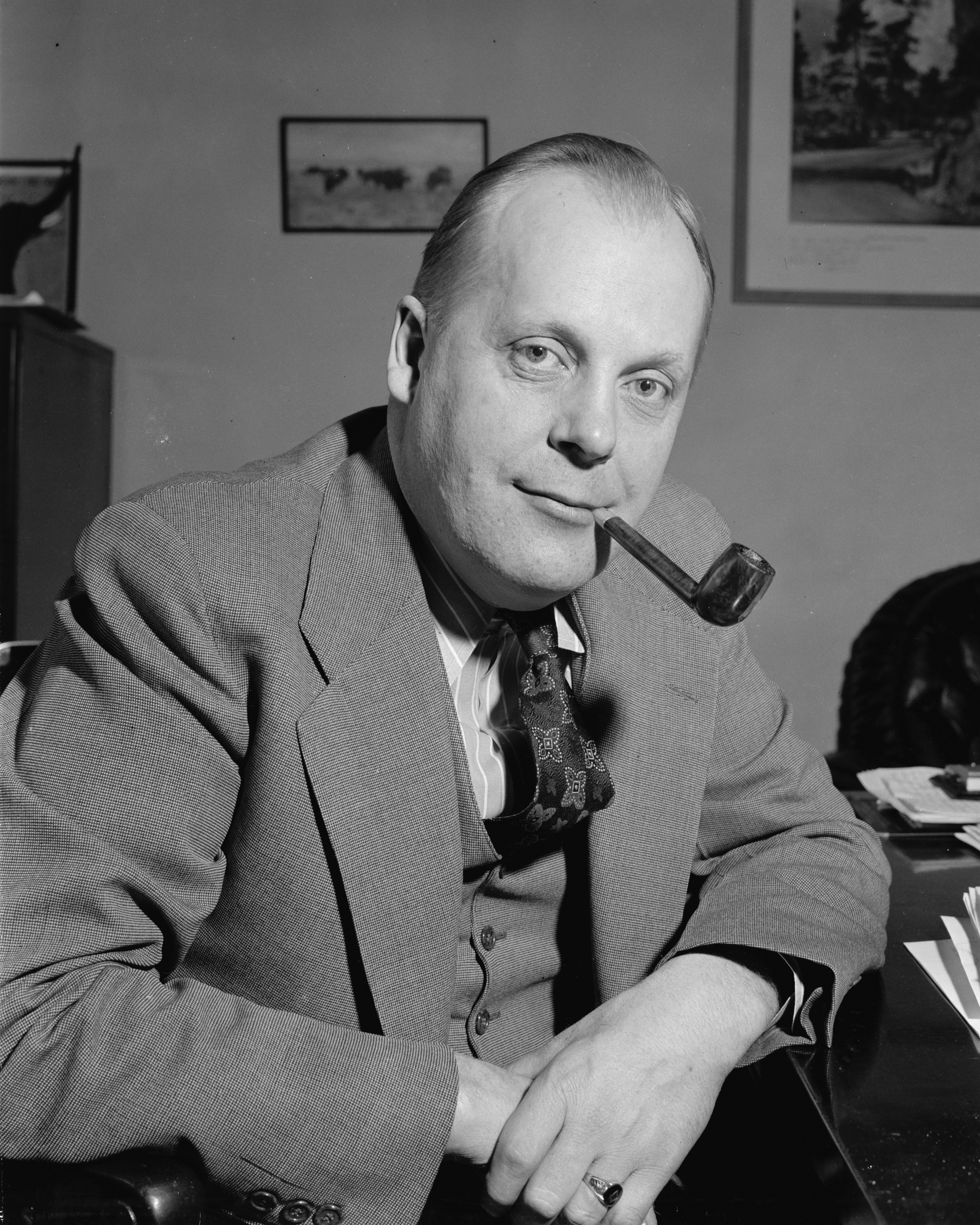

Nominee	Karl E. Mundt	Kenneth Holum
Party	Republican	Democratic
Popular vote	135,071	100,674
Percentage	57.30%	42.70%
- County results Mundt: 50–60% 60–70% 70–80% Holum: 50–60%
U.S. senator before election
Karl E. Mundt
Republican
Elected U.S. Senator
Karl E. Mundt
Republican

The 1954 United States Senate election in South Dakota took place on November 2, 1954. Incumbent Republican Senator Karl E. Mundt ran for re-election to his second term. He was opposed by former State Representative Kenneth Holum, the Democratic nominee. Mundt defeated Holum in a landslide to win re-election.

== Primary elections ==
Both Mundt and Holum won their primaries without opposition. Mundt announced that he would seek a second term on December 31, 1953, amid speculation that Governor Sigurd Anderson would challenge him in the Republican primary. However, on February 9, 1954, Anderson announced that he wouldn't challenge Mundt, and would instead retire rather than seek re-election. No candidates emerged against Mundt until Kenneth Holum, a former State Representative from Groton, announced his campaign on April 5, 1954. Former State Senator David L. Wickens announced that he would challenge Mundt in the Republican primary, but was unable to gather a sufficient number of petitions and dropped out of the race. With Wickens out of the race, no other candidates emerged, and Mundt and Holum faced no opposition for their parties' nominations. Accordingly, both races were removed from the primary election ballot.

== General election ==
=== Results ===
1954 United States Senate election in South Dakota
Party	Candidate	Votes	%	±%
Republican	Karl E. Mundt (inc.)	135,071	57.30%	−2.04%
Democratic	Kenneth Holum	100,674	42.70%	+2.04%
Majority		34,397	14.59%	−4.08%
Turnout		242,833	100.00%	
Republican hold				
