= Francis Case =

American journalist and politician (1896–1962)

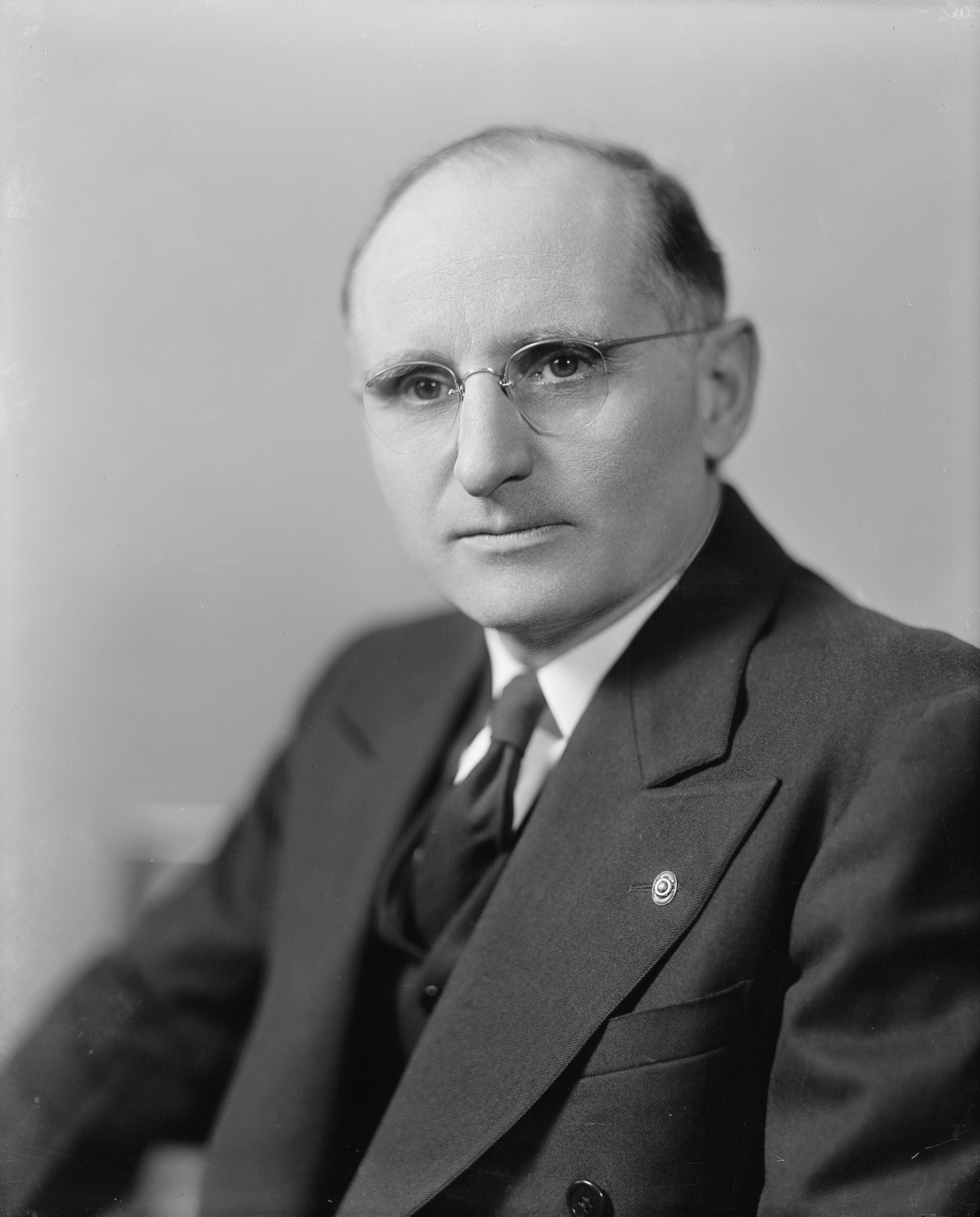

United States Senator from South Dakota
- In office January 3, 1951 – June 22, 1962
- Preceded by: Chan Gurney
- Succeeded by: Joe Bottum

Member of the U.S. House of Representatives from South Dakota's 2nd district
- In office January 3, 1937 – January 3, 1951
- Preceded by: Theodore B. Werner
- Succeeded by: E. Y. Berry

Personal details
- Born: Francis Higbee Case; December 9, 1896 Everly, Iowa, U.S.
- Died: June 22, 1962 (aged 65) Bethesda, Maryland, U.S.
- Resting place: Black Hills National Cemetery in Sturgis
- Party: Republican
- Spouse: Myrle Graves
- Education: Dakota Wesleyan University; Northwestern University
- Occupation: Journalist

Military service
- Branch/service: United States Marine Corps; United States Army
- Battles/wars: World War I

Francis Higbee Case (December 9, 1896 – June 22, 1962) was an American journalist and politician who served for 25 years as a member of the United States Congress from South Dakota. He was a Republican.

== Biography ==
Case was born in Everly, Iowa, the son of Mary Ellen (née Grannis) and the Reverend Herbert Llywellen Case. He moved with his parents to Sturgis, South Dakota, at the age of 13. After graduating from the public schools he attended Dakota Wesleyan University and Northwestern University graduating in 1920.

=== Military service ===
During World War I he served in the United States Marine Corps, and subsequently he served in United States Army Reserve and the Marine Corps Reserve.

=== Newspaper editor ===
Immediately after finishing college, he began a 15-year career as a newspaper editor. Until 1922, he was the assistant editor of the Epworth Herald in Chicago. From 1922 to 1925 he was the telegraph writer and editorial writer for the Daily Journal in Rapid City, South Dakota. From 1925 to 1931 he was the editor and publisher of the Hot Springs Star in Hot Springs, South Dakota. Finally from 1931 until he entered Congress he was the editor and publisher of the Custer Chronicle in Custer, South Dakota.

=== U.S. House of Representatives (1937–1951) ===
Case entered politics in 1934 when he ran for a seat in the United States House of Representatives but lost. In 1936, however, he was elected to the U.S. House and served in it for seven terms. Before the United States entered World War II, he was a moderate supporter of isolationism. In 1947–8, he served on the Herter Committee. Case left the House in 1951 when he became a senator.

=== U.S. Senate (1951–1962) ===
Case decided to run for the Senate in the 1950 election, and defeated the incumbent John Chandler Gurney in the Republican primary. In the general election, he easily defeated Democrat John A. Engel, receiving 63% of the vote. In his first term in the Senate, he served as chairman of the United States Senate Committee on the District of Columbia from 1953 to 1955, and was a supporter of greater self-rule in the district. In 1954, he served on a committee to investigate censuring Senator Joseph McCarthy. Case was reelected to the Senate in 1956, in a very close race against Democrat Kenneth Holum, receiving 50.8% of the vote.

Case was known as a moderate senator whose main goals were to expand America's road and waterway infrastructure, particularly in South Dakota. Lake Francis Case, along the Missouri River, is named after him, as is a bridge on I-395 in Washington, D.C. Case voted in favor of the Civil Rights Acts of 1957 and 1960, but did not vote on the 24th Amendment to the U.S. Constitution.

In 1956, Case alleged that he had been offered a $2,500 campaign contribution dependent on his support for the Harris-Fulbright Natural Gas Bill which would deregulate the natural gas market. The scandal led to the veto of the bill by President Dwight D. Eisenhower.

Case served in the Senate from 1951 until his death.

=== Death and burial ===
He died of a heart attack at the Naval Hospital in Bethesda, Maryland, on June 22, 1962. His death occurred several months before the expiration of his second term in the Senate. He is buried at Black Hills National Cemetery in Sturgis.

== Honors ==
- South Dakota Highway 44 over the Missouri River in South Dakota has been dedicated as the Francis Case Memorial Bridge, crossing the Lake Francis Case43.059722°N 98.561944°W

== See also ==
- List of members of the United States Congress who died in office (1950–1999)
- List of members of the House Un-American Activities Committee

Party political offices
Preceded by John Chandler Gurney	Republican nominee for U.S. Senator from South Dakota (Class 3); 1950, 1956, 1962	Succeeded by Joseph H. Bottum
U.S. House of Representatives
Preceded by Theodore B. Werner	United States Representative (2nd district) for South Dakota; 1937–1951	Succeeded by E. Y. Berry
U.S. Senate
Preceded by J. Chandler Gurney	U.S. senator (Class 3) from South Dakota; 1951–1962; Served alongside: Karl E. Mundt	Succeeded by Joseph H. Bottum
