= Karl Mundt =

American politician (1900–1974)

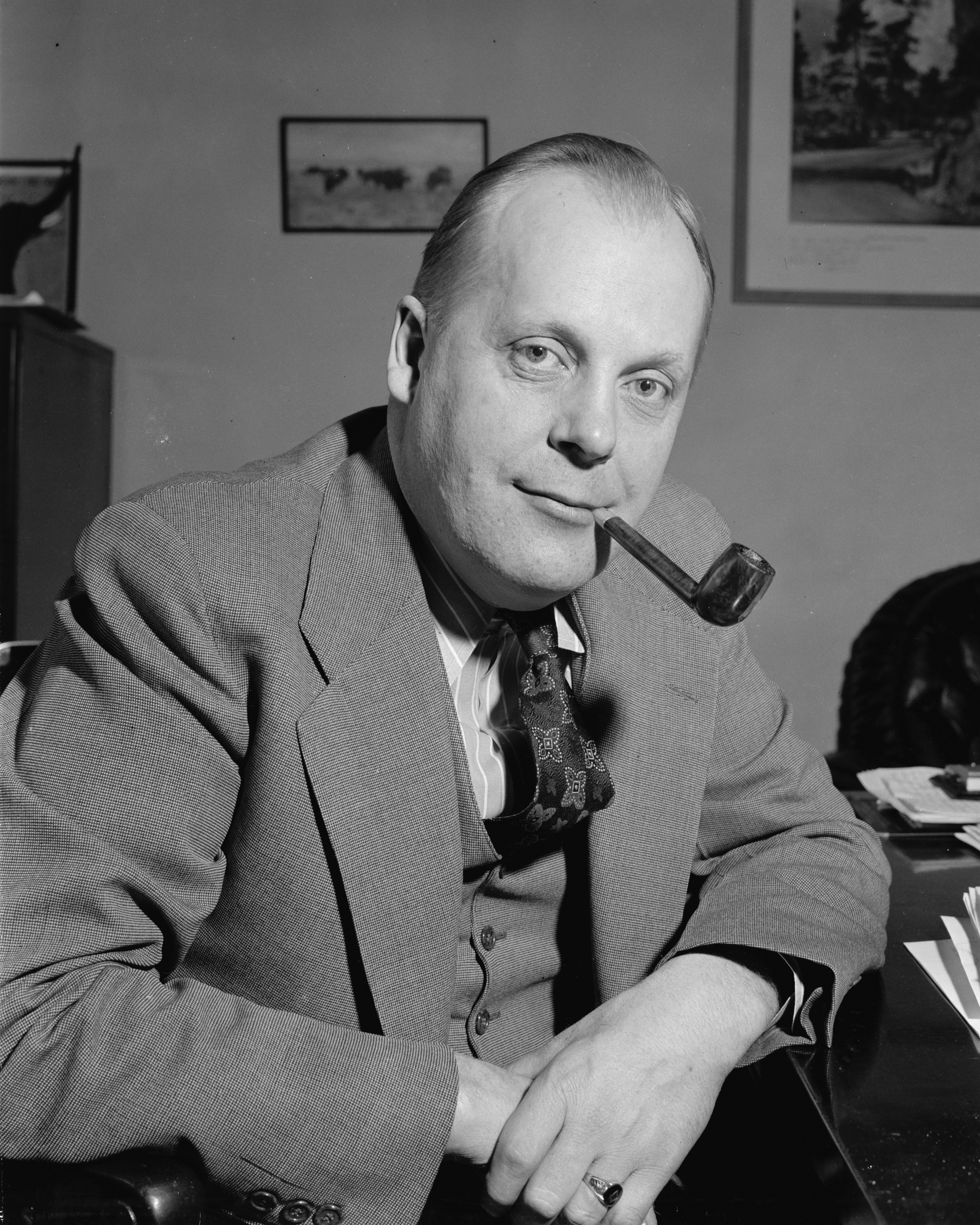
- Mundt in 1940

United States Senator from South Dakota
- In office December 31, 1948 – January 3, 1973
- Preceded by: Vera C. Bushfield
- Succeeded by: James Abourezk

Member of the U.S. House of Representatives from South Dakota's 1st district
- In office January 3, 1939 – December 31, 1948
- Preceded by: Fred H. Hildebrandt
- Succeeded by: Harold O. Lovre

Personal details
- Born: Karl Earl Mundt; June 3, 1900 Humboldt, South Dakota, U.S.
- Died: August 16, 1974 (aged 74) Washington, D.C., U.S.
- Resting place: Graceland Cemetery in Madison, South Dakota
- Party: Republican
- Spouse: Mary Elizabeth Moses (m. 1924)
- Parents: Ferdinand John Mundt (father); Rose Schneider (mother)
- Education: Carleton College
- Occupation: Teacher; school administrator; politician

Karl Earl Mundt (June 3, 1900 – August 16, 1974) was an American educator and politician who represented South Dakota in the United States House of Representatives (1939–1948) and in the United States Senate (1948–1973).

== Early life and career ==
Mundt was born in Humboldt, South Dakota. He was the son of Ferdinand John Mundt (1875–1947) and Rose (Schneider) Mundt (1874–1965). Both of his parents were the descendants of German immigrants. Mundt attended public schools in Humboldt, Pierre, and Madison, graduating from Madison High School in 1919. In high school, he excelled in oratory and debate, which became lifetime passions.

After receiving a Bachelor of Arts degree from Carleton College in Minnesota in 1923 with a major in economics, he became a teacher and principal at Bryant High School in Bryant, South Dakota. As a first-year teacher he taught speech, psychology, sociology, and government, coached the debate, oratory, and extemporaneous speech teams, and began a school newspaper. After his first year, he was promoted to Superintendent of Bryant schools, a position he held until 1927. As superintendent, he continued to coach debate and oratory.

== Political career ==
=== U.S. House of Representatives ===
In 1936, Mundt was the Republican candidate for the House of Representatives in South Dakota's 1st congressional district, losing in a Democratic year to Fred H. Hildebrandt. He won the seat in the 1938 election, a year more favorable to Republicans, and was re-elected four times.

=== U.S. Senate ===
In 1948, he was elected to the Senate seat previously held by Harlan J. Bushfield. He resigned his House seat on December 30, 1948, having been appointed to the Senate to fill the vacancy created by the resignation of Senator Vera C. Bushfield, who had succeeded her husband after his death in September 1948. Mundt was re-elected to the Senate in 1954, 1960, and 1966. His only close contest came in 1960, when he was nearly defeated by then-Representative George McGovern.

=== Illness ===
On November 23, 1969, Mundt suffered a severe stroke and was subsequently unable to attend sessions of Congress, although he received extensive speech and physical therapy. His wife, Mary, led his staff in Mundt's place and refused calls for the crippled Senator to resign. Mundt was stripped of his committee assignments by the Senate Republican Conference in 1972, but he remained in office through the end of his term on January 3, 1973. He did not seek reelection in 1972, and was succeeded in the Senate by Democrat James G. Abourezk.

=== Accomplishments in Congress ===
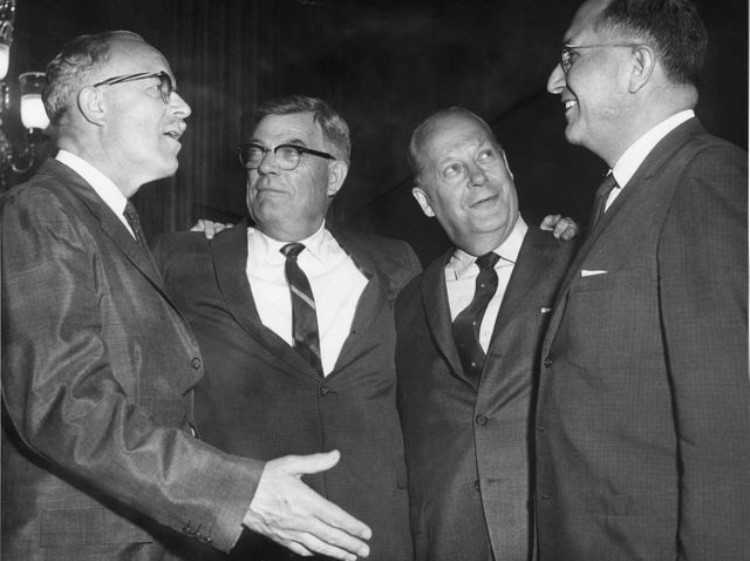
South Dakota's congressional delegation in the 87th U.S. Congress. L-R: Ellis Y. Berry, Joseph H. Bottum, Karl E. Mundt, and Ben Reifel.

In the House of Representatives, Mundt sponsored and supported proposals for "Buy American" legislation, was a member of the Foreign Affairs committee from 1941 to 1948, and played a key role in encouraging the United States to join the United Nations Educational, Scientific and Cultural Organization (UNESCO) in 1945. He was a key proponent of the Voice of America, which was established as a result of the Smith-Mundt Act, signed into law in 1948. He was a member of the House Un-American Activities Committee from 1943 to 1948. HUAC's activities during this period included the Alger Hiss hearings and investigations of the motion picture industry. Mundt was unsuccessful in attempts to have HUAC continue investigating the Ku Klux Klan.

He also introduced a modification to Title 50, criminalizing the passage of certain classified information to foreign nationals. He sat on the McClellan Committee (1957–60), which probed organized crime within trade unions.

Mundt voted in favor of the Civil Rights Acts of 1957, 1960, 1964, and 1968, as well as the 24th Amendment to the U.S. Constitution, the Voting Rights Act of 1965, and the confirmation of Thurgood Marshall to the U.S. Supreme Court.

As a Senator, Mundt served on the Senate's Appropriations Committee, Foreign Relations Committee, Government Operations Committee, and Permanent Investigations Subcommittee, and he represented the Senate on the Intergovernmental Relations Advisory Commission. In 1954, he chaired the Senate Subcommittee on Investigations for the Army-McCarthy Hearings. His accomplishments as a Senator included obtaining support for Missouri River projects, establishment of the EROS Data Center in Sioux Falls, South Dakota, agriculture programs, and Interstate highway construction in South Dakota.

== National Forensic League ==
In 1925, Bruno E. Jacob founded the National Forensic League, a high school organization promoting speech and debate activities. Mundt served as the organization's national president from 1932 until 1971.

Mundt was the primary sponsor of the Alexander Hamilton Bicentennial Convention, held in the summer of 1957. It featured 55 high school (mostly) seniors in Washington, D.C., and Philadelphia, Pennsylvania, as representatives of the (then) 48 states and seven territories in a "mock" constitutional convention.

== Death and burial ==
Karl Mundt died in Washington, D.C. in 1974 of a heart ailment and was buried at Graceland Cemetery in Madison, South Dakota.

== Personal life ==
In 1924, Mundt married Mary Elizabeth Moses (1900–1985), a college classmate who also taught at Bryant High School. In 1927, both Karl and Mary Mundt received Master of Arts degrees from Columbia University following four years of summer study there. Beginning in 1928, they both taught at Eastern State Normal School (now Dakota State University), continuing there until 1936. Karl headed the speech department and taught psychology and economics, while Mary taught drama and French.

== Legacy ==
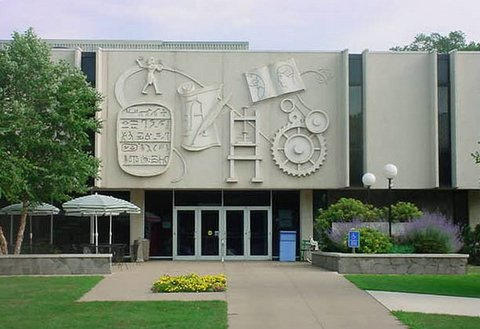
The Karl Mundt Library, located on the campus of Dakota State University

The Karl Mundt Archives including personal papers, congressional correspondence and many personal items are available at Dakota State University in Madison. The Karl Mundt Library was named in his honor and dedicated by Richard Nixon in 1969. The Karl E. Mundt National Wildlife Refuge in South Dakota was named in his honor when it was established in 1974.

The Karl E. Mundt Foundation, established in Mundt's honor in 1963, awards prizes for essays and oratorical contests, sponsors seminars and public lectures, and helps support the annual Karl E. Mundt Debate Tournament and Karl E. Mundt Dakota Invitational Oral Interpretation Contest in South Dakota. The Karl E. Mundt Foundation had its offices at the Karl Mundt Library at Dakota State University, but closed in July 2017. The Karl Mundt Archives are now one with the library.

=== In film ===
One of the principal characters of the Coen brothers' 1991 film Barton Fink is a traveling salesman named Karl Mundt, played by actor John Goodman.

== See also ==
- House Un-American Activities Committee
  - List of members of the House Un-American Activities Committee
- Mundt–Nixon Bill
- Smith–Mundt Act
- UNESCO
- Voice of America

== Related reading ==
- Heidepriem, Scott (1988) A Fair Chance for a Free People: A Biography of Karl E. Mundt, United States Senator (Madison, SD: Leader Printing)

Party political offices
Preceded by Harlan J. Bushfield	Republican nominee for U.S. Senator from South Dakota (Class 2); 1948, 1954, 1960, 1966	Succeeded by Robert W. Hirsch
U.S. House of Representatives
Preceded by Fred H. Hildebrandt	Member of the U.S. House of Representatives from South Dakota's 1st congressional district 1939–1948	Succeeded by Harold O. Lovre
U.S. Senate
Preceded by Vera C. Bushfield	U.S. senator (Class 2) from South Dakota; 1948–1973; Served alongside: J. Chandler Gurney, Francis H. Case, Joseph H. Bottum and George McGovern	Succeeded by James Abourezk
