= 1962 United States Senate election in South Dakota =

- November 6, 1962

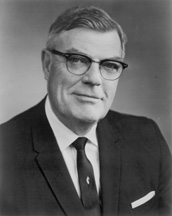
Nominee	George McGovern	Joe Bottum
Party	Democratic	Republican
Popular vote	127,458	126,861
Percentage	50.12%	49.88%
- County results McGovern: 50–60% 60–70% Bottum: 50–60% 60–70% 70–80%
U.S. senator before election
Joe Bottum
Republican
Elected U.S. Senator
George McGovern
Democratic

The 1962 United States Senate election in South Dakota took place on November 6, 1962. Incumbent Republican Senator Francis H. Case ran for re-election to a third term. He won the Republican primary against Attorney General A. C. Miller, but shortly after the primary, died. The Republican State Central Committee named Lieutenant Governor Joseph H. Bottum as Case's replacement on the ballot, and Governor Archie Gubbrud appointed Bottum to fill the vacancy caused by Case's death. In the general election, Bottum was opposed by Democratic nominee George McGovern, the Director of Food for Peace and the former U.S. Congressman from South Dakota's 1st congressional district. The contest between Bottum and McGovern was quite close, with McGovern narrowly defeating him for election by just 597 votes, making him the first Democrat to win a Senate election in South Dakota since William J. Bulow's win in 1936.

== Democratic primary ==
=== Candidates ===
Former Lieutenant Governor John F. Lindley announced that he would run for the U.S. Senate, but dropped out of the race when former Congressman George McGovern, who briefly served in the Kennedy administration as Director of Food for Peace, announced that he would run. McGovern was the only Democratic candidate to file for the race, and the primary election did not appear on the ballot.

== Republican primary ==
=== Candidates ===
- Francis H. Case, incumbent U.S. senator
- A. C. Miller, South Dakota Attorney General

=== Results ===
Republican primary
Party	Candidate	Votes	%
Republican	Francis H. Case (incumbent)	57,583	83.46%
Republican	A. C. Miller	11,414	16.54%
Total votes		102,137	100.00%

Several weeks after winning the Republican primary, Senator Case died in office. The Republican Party of South Dakota named Lieutenant Governor Joseph H. Bottum as Case's replacement on the ballot, and Governor Gubbrud appointed him as Case's successor.

== General election ==
=== Results ===
1962 United States Senate election in South Dakota
Party	Candidate	Votes	%	±%
Democratic	George McGovern	127,458	50.12%	+0.91%
Republican	Joseph H. Bottum (incumbent)	126,861	49.88%	−0.91%
Majority		597	0.24%	−1.35%
Turnout		290,622	100.00%	
Democratic gain from Republican				
