= South Dakota's 2nd congressional district =

Former U.S. House district from 1913 to 1983

Coordinates: 44°40′N 101°0′W

- Obsolete district
- Created: 1910
- Eliminated: 1980
- Years active: 1913–1983

South Dakota's 2nd congressional district is an obsolete U.S. congressional district. It was created after the 1910 census and was eliminated as a result of the redistricting cycle after the 1980 census. Members were elected at-large until the formation of individual districts after the 1910 census. From 1913 until 1933, it covered much of northeastern South Dakota, including the cities of Aberdeen, Brookings, Huron, and Watertown. When South Dakota's 3rd congressional district was eliminated after the 1930 census, the 2nd district was relocated to cover all of the counties in South Dakota west of the Missouri River. Population changes eventually moved its boundaries further east. During the 97th Congress, it covered all but the 21 easternmost counties in the state.

== List of representatives ==
Member (Residence)	Party	Years	Cong ress	Electoral history
District established March 4, 1913
Charles H. Burke (Pierre)	Republican	March 4, 1913 – March 3, 1915	63rd	Redistricted from the at-large district and re-elected in 1912; Retired to run for U.S. senator.
Royal C. Johnson (Aberdeen)	Republican	March 4, 1915 – March 3, 1933	64th 65th 66th 67th 68th 69th 70th 71st 72nd	Elected in 1914. Re-elected in 1916. Re-elected in 1918. Re-elected in 1920. Re-elected in 1922. Re-elected in 1924. Re-elected in 1926. Re-elected in 1928. Re-elected in 1930. Lost re-election.
Theodore B. Werner (Rapid City)	Democratic	March 4, 1933 – January 3, 1937	73rd 74th	Elected in 1932. Re-elected in 1934; Lost re-election.
Francis H. Case (Custer)	Republican	January 3, 1937 – January 3, 1951	75th 76th 77th 78th 79th 80th 81st	Elected in 1936. Re-elected in 1938. Re-elected in 1940. Re-elected in 1942. Re-elected in 1944. Re-elected in 1946. Re-elected in 1948. Retired to run for U.S. senator.
E. Y. Berry (McLaughlin)	Republican	January 3, 1951 – January 3, 1971	82nd 83rd 84th 85th 86th 87th 88th 89th 90th 91st	Elected in 1950. Re-elected in 1952. Re-elected in 1954. Re-elected in 1956. Re-elected in 1958. Re-elected in 1960. Re-elected in 1962. Re-elected in 1964. Re-elected in 1966. Re-elected in 1968. Retired.
James Abourezk (Rapid City)	Democratic	January 3, 1971 – January 3, 1973	92nd	Elected in 1970. Retired to run for U.S. senator.
James Abdnor (Kennebec)	Republican	January 3, 1973 – January 3, 1981	93rd 94th 95th 96th	Elected in 1972. Re-elected in 1974. Re-elected in 1976. Re-elected in 1978. Retired to run for U.S. senator.
Clint Roberts (Presho)	Republican	January 3, 1981 – January 3, 1983	97th	Elected in 1980. Redistricted to the at-large district and lost re-election.
District dissolved January 3, 1983
