= Paul Sarvela =

American health educator

- Born: Paul Douglas Sarvela; August 7, 1959; Gloucester, Massachusetts, US
- Died: November 9, 2014 (aged 55); Carbondale, Illinois, US

Paul Douglas Sarvela (August 7, 1959 – November 9, 2014) was Professor of health education and Dean of the College of Applied Sciences and Arts at Southern Illinois University Carbondale (SIUC). The college is unique in being the only comprehensive, technically oriented college that is part of a major research university. Following the departure of Rita Cheng to become president of Northern Arizona University, Sarvela was named as interim chancellor on July 8, 2014, and it was confirmed on July 24, 2014. He was born in Gloucester, Massachusetts, and died on November 9, 2014, in Carbondale, Illinois, while undergoing treatment for cancer.

Sarvela authored or co-authored more than 60 publications in peer-reviewed journals, as well as several textbooks, monographs, and technical reports. With more than 130 conference papers to his name, his work has been presented nationwide in the United States, as well as in parts of Europe, where he was a visiting professor at the University of Cologne (Germany) and a lecturer in Finland.

Sarvela earned a bachelor's degree in psychology in 1981, a master's degree in educational psychology in 1983 and a doctorate in health education in 1984, all from the University of Michigan. He began his professional career as a program evaluator for Ford Aerospace and Communications Corporation (1984–86), primarily doing classified work for the National Security Agency.

In 1986 he joined the faculty of SIUC’s Department of Health Education, where he was widely regarded as the replacement for recently departed Robert S. Gold. He was promoted to the rank of associate professor in 1989 and to full professor in 1992.

Collaborating with Elena Sliepcevich and David Duncan, his publications from the early 1980s largely focused on the study of risk taking and risk reduction related to alcohol and other drug use in youth. Many of the studies during this early stage of his career were conducted in rural settings, thus providing a catalyst for his later work in the SIU-C Center for Rural Health and Social Service Development. Throughout his career many of his publications have been concerned with instrument development, needs assessment, program evaluation, and the creation of responsive interventions and curricula. His research blended the rural setting; the multiple health-related problems of that setting; and the challenging issues of measurement and evaluation.

During the 1996-1997 academic year, Sarvela was an American Council on Education (ACE) Fellow at the University of Wisconsin–Madison. This experience afforded him an opportunity to enhance his skills in educational leadership, strategic planning, and systems operations. Aspects of this experience became two chapters ("Needs Assessment and Strategic Planning"; "Assessing Program Costs and Effects") in the book Health Education Evaluation and Measurement - A Practitioner's Perspective, 2nd edition, which he co-authored with Dr Robert J McDermott in 1999. This fellowship also contributed to his movement into administration first as Director of the Center for Rural Health and Social Service Development. He became chair of the Department of Health Care Professions in 1999. In 2002, he was appointed to the position of Dean of the College of Applied Sciences and Arts.
