= Charles Basch =

American health educator

Charles Basch is the Richard March Hoe Professor of Health and Education at Teachers College, Columbia University, New York City, New York. He teaches courses related to epidemiology, planning and evaluation. Before coming to Teachers College, he was Assistant Professor of Community Health Education at Russell Sage College in Troy, New York.

He earned his B.S. and M.S. in community health education at the State University of New York at Brockport and his Ph.D. in health education at Southern Illinois University Carbondale, where he studied under four of the field's most prominent leaders, Robert S. Gold, David F. Duncan, Elena Sliepcevich, and Robert Russell.

Basch's main scholarly interests are improving understanding of (1) health-related decision making, (2) dissemination and implementation of effective health-related programs and policies, and (3) the influence of health factors on educational outcomes in urban minority youth. In particular, he has documented a link between childhood health and learning in school. His research identifies seven factors (poor vision, asthma, teen pregnancy, aggression and violence, physical inactivity, ADHD, and insufficient breakfast) that can and do lead to health disparities and contribute to poorer academic achievement. He notes that students will perform and learn better every day if they are "well-rested and well-nourished". During his 25 years at Teachers College, he has directed approximately $15 million of grant-funded research and program development (primarily supported by the National Institutes of Health), and he continues to do so. His work has yielded over 100 scholarly publications.
