= Mark Kittleson =

American health education academic

Dr. Mark J. Kittleson, Professor of Health Education at Southern Illinois University (SIU) has followed in the footsteps of his outstanding predecessors at SIU, Robert Gold and Paul Sarvela, in becoming a leader in the development of PC-based and web-based applications in health education. In 1992, he established an email discussion group that came to be known as the Health Education Directory or HEDIR, which has been called the most significant development to impact health education in the past 20 years. Under his leadership HEDIR has given rise to the HEDIR Award, which recognizes contributions to the applications of technology to health education.

Dr. Kittleson was the founder and first editor, in 1998, of the International Electronic Journal of Health Education and is author of a column in the American Journal of Health Behavior, entitled "Electronic Notes," which is designed to improve understanding and utilization of technology for conducting research on health behavior.

He began his professional career in health education at the Maine Health Education Resource Center, where he worked with Charles Basch under the direction of William H. Zimmerli. He then returned to school at the University of Akron, completing his Ph.D. there in 1986. He taught at Youngstown State University until 1989 when he joined the faculty of SIU.

Dr. Kittleson is the author of 15 books—some of the more recent have been Vital Statistics for the Public Health Educator, 2nd edition (HEDIR Publishing, 2005), Mental Health: Dimensions of Self-Esteem and Emotional Well-Being (with N. Eburne and J. Donnelly) (Allyn and Bacon Publishers, 2000), and Using Excel to Run Statistics (HEDIR Publishing, 2005). He has also published more than eighty peer-reviewed articles in such journals as the Journal of Health Education, the Journal of School Health, the Journal of Family Practice, the Southern Medical Journal, AIDS Education and Prevention, and the American Journal of Health Behavior. Most of his publications focus on needs assessment of teachers, particularly with respect to HIV/AIDS information; and the impact of the Internet and other technology on research and research communication.
