= Kittleson =

Kittleson is a surname. Notable people with the surname include:

- Drew Kittleson (born 1989), American golfer
- Isaac Milo Kittleson (1874–1958), American politician
- Mark Kittleson (born 1952), American health educator
- Shelly Kittleson, American journalist
- Travis Kittleson (born 1979), American stock car racing driver

== See also ==
- Kittleson House, a historic house in Barneveld, Wisconsin, U.S.
