= Partnership for Child Development =

English research group

The Partnership for Child Development (PCD)
- Founded: 1992
- Purpose: School Health & Nutrition, Poverty reduction
- Location: Imperial College, London
- Origins: University of Oxford
- Region served: Global
- Method: Capacity building, knowledge dissemination, building the evidence base and building global partnerships.
- Website: http://www.imperial.ac.uk/partnership-for-child-development

The Partnership for Child Development (PCD) is a research and technical assistance group based at Imperial College London that seeks to improve health and nutrition in school-age children and youth in low-income countries, thereby improving their education outcomes. PCD was formed in 1992 at the University of Oxford to bridge gaps between academia, funding bodies and the education and health sectors in low-income countries.

== History ==
Based on a growing evidence base for the beneficial nature of antihelminthic treatment (deworming) in the early 1990s, the Partnership for Child Development was formed by the United Nations Development Programme and the Rockefeller Foundation within the Scientific Coordinating Centre at the University of Oxford. PCD is now based within Imperial College London's Department of Infectious Disease Epidemiology, in St Mary's Hospital, London, funded by international development organisations including the World Bank and the Bill and Melinda Gates Foundation.

== Organisational focus ==
PCD supports low-income countries to meet their school health needs using the findings of evidence-based research. PCD is a knowledge-based institution which creates and shares information. Core health interventions that PCD supports are school feeding & nutrition, deworming, water and sanitation, disability screening, and health education.

It conducts operational research showing how interventions can be implemented and evaluated at the country level, for example enabling mass treatment of children for common infections such as hookworm and bilharzia. PCD also facilitates the sharing of knowledge between academia, governments and agencies at both national and international level, through web sites, mailing lists, and a global network of partners. In recent years, a major focus of this work has been assisting educators and health professionals to work together to help schools respond to the threat that HIV/AIDS poses to education, as well as supporting governments to better target orphans and vulnerable children in their child health programming.

A major function of PCD is capacity building, by means of courses and workshops for governmental and non-governmental staff in developing countries. These include annual training courses in school-based health, nutrition in sub-Saharan Africa and Asia in partnership with local academic organisations such as Mahidol University, the University of Ghana, and the Kenya Medical Research Institute.

PCD are a core member of FRESH (Focusing Resources on Effective School Health), an inter-agency initiative that the group jointly developed with WHO, UNICEF, UNESCO, and the World Bank. This initiative is a key guiding strategy for PCD's development work.
