= Marie Agnes Hinrichs =

American physiologist and zoologist

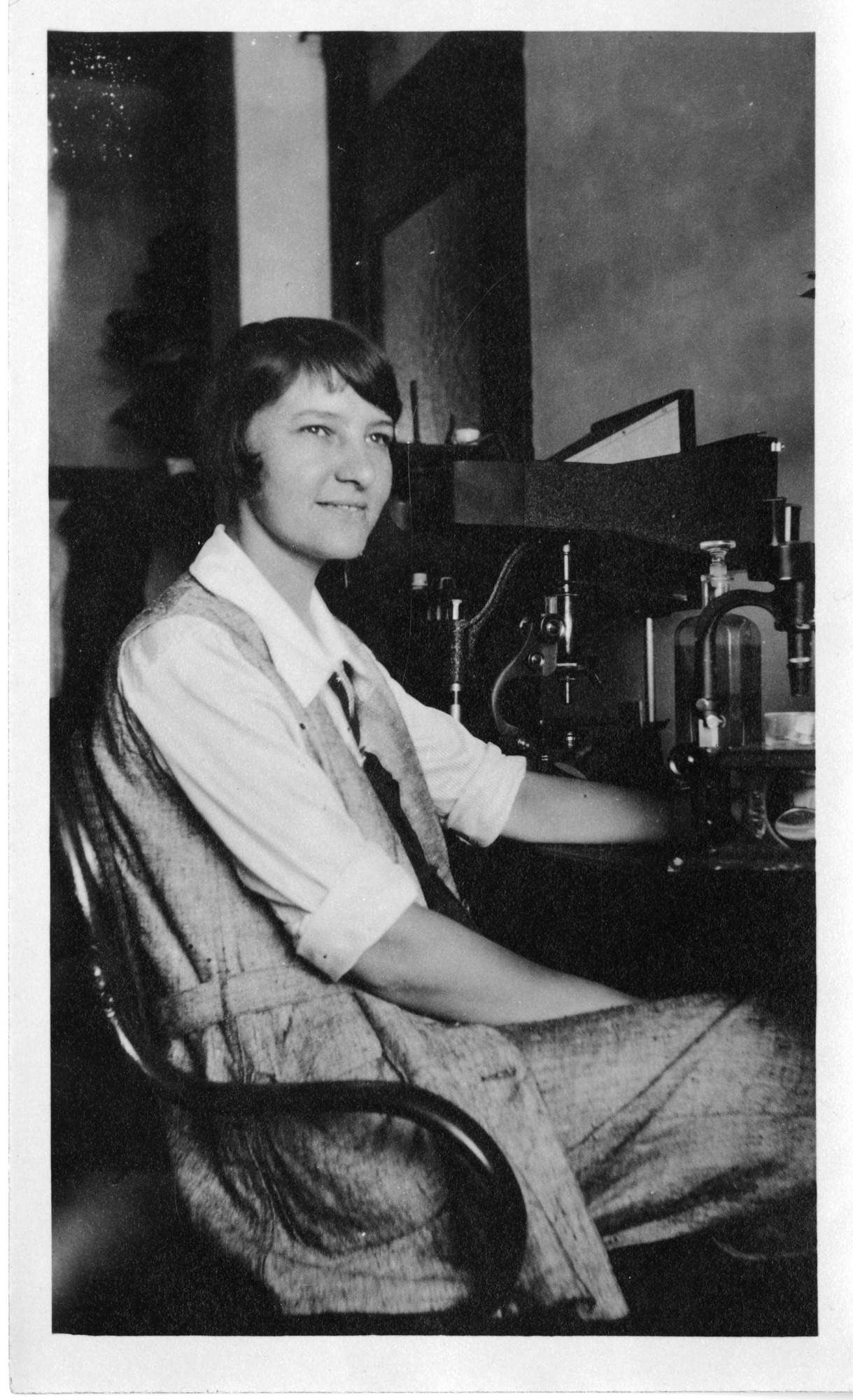
- Born: 1892
- Died: 1979 (aged 86–87)
- Citizenship: USA
- Education: University of Chicago; Rush Medical College
- Known for: zoology, embryo radiation research, physiology, health education
- Scientific career
- Fields: Zoology, Physiology, Physical Health
- Workplaces: Southern Illinois University, University of Illinois
- Thesis: (1923)
- Doctoral advisor: Charles Manning Child

Marie Agnes Hinrichs Ph.D., M.D. (1892 – 1979) was an American scientist specializing in zoology, physiology, and physical health. She earned a Ph.D. in zoology in 1923, conferred from the University of Chicago. She taught at the University of Chicago, before moving on to direct departments at Southern Illinois University and University of Illinois. She became known for her research into the effects of both ultraviolet radiation and visible radiation on living matter, with particular interest in the effects on developing embryos.

Her awards include the University Distinguished Service Award from Southern Illinois University Carbondale, the Distinguished Service Award and the William A. Howe Award from the American School Health Association.

== Education ==
Hinrichs studied at the University of Chicago and earned a Ph.D. in zoology. During her studies, she served as an assistant in Zoology. She studied under Charles Manning Child. Hinrichs spent fourteen summers researching at the Woods Hole Marine Biological Laboratory. She also researched at the NELA Research Laboratory at Nela Park. She earned an M.D. from Rush Medical College.

== Research and teaching ==
Prior to her study at the University of Chicago, Hinrichs graduated from the Chicago Teachers College - Lake Forest College. She taught at Chicago Public Schools and Vassar College.

In 1947, Hinrichs served as the director of the Health Service at Southern Illinois University Carbondale. Under her supervision, the Department of Physiology was established through courses in Introductory Physiology and Advanced Mammalian Physiology. She departed SIU in 1949 for a post the University of Illinois at Urbana–Champaign, leaving Harold M. Kaplan to grow the program.

Hinrichs was a national president of Sigma Delta Epsilon. She served as the editor for the Journal of School Health from 1954 to 1959.

== Distinctions, publications and memberships ==
- American School Health Association Distinguished Service Award
- American School Health Association William A. Howe Award (1969)
- Southern Illinois University Distinguished Service Award.
- Hinrichs, M. A. (1926). The Effect of Ultraviolet Radiation on the Fertilizing Power of Arbacia Sperm. Biological Bulletin, 50(6), 473–489. doi:10.2307/1536484
- Hinrichs, M. A. (1924), A demonstration of the axial gradient by means of photolysis. J. Exp. Zool., 41: 21–31. doi:10.1002/jez.1400410104
