= James H. Price =

James H. Price may refer to:

- James Hervey Price (1797–1882), Canadian attorney and political figure
- James Hubert Price (1878–1943), American politician and governor
- James H. Price (academic) (fl. 1990s–2000s), American academic
- J. H. Price (c. 1862–1947), justice of the Mississippi Supreme Court
