= List of Eta Sigma Gamma chapters =

Eta Sigma Gamma is an American honor society for health education. It was founded on August 14, 1967, at Ball State University. In addition to the national at-large professional chapter, the society has the following chapters, with active chapters indicated in bold and inactive chapters and institutions in italics.

Chapter	Charter date and range	Institution	Location	Status	Ref.
**Alpha**	May 12, 1968	Ball State University	Muncie, Indiana	Active	
Beta	1968–202x ?	Eastern Kentucky University	Richmond, Kentucky	Inactive	
Gamma	1970–202x ?	California State University, Long Beach	Long Beach, California	Inactive	
Delta	197x ?–2000	San Diego State University	San Diego, California	Inactive	
**Epsilon**	197x ?–xxxx ?, 2017	University of Maryland, College Park	College Park, Maryland	Active	
Zeta (see **Zeta Alpha**)	197x ?–1987	The College of New Jersey	Ewing, New Jersey	Inactive	
**Eta**	197x ?	Central Michigan University	Mount Pleasant, Michigan	Active	
Theta	December 13, 1972 – 1987	University of Nebraska–Lincoln	Lincoln, Nebraska	Inactive	
Iota	197x ?–202x ?	University of Toledo	Toledo, Ohio	Inactive	
**Kappa**	197x ?	State University of New York at Cortland	Cortland, New York	Active	
Lambda	1974–202x ?	Indiana State University	Terre Haute, Indiana	Inactive	
Mu	April 20, 1980 –2010	Western Kentucky University	Bowling Green, Kentucky	Inactive	
**Nu**	March 22, 1974	Indiana University Bloomington	Bloomington, Indiana	Active	
Xi	1974–2002	Purdue University	West Lafayette, Indiana	Inactive	
Omicron	19xx ?–2000	Slippery Rock University	Slippery Rock, Pennsylvania	Inactive	
Pi	1974–202x ?	Western Illinois University	Macomb, Illinois	Inactive	
Rho	19xx ?–202x ?	Kent State University	Kent, Ohio	Inactive	
**Sigma**	19xx ?	James Madison University	Harrisonburg, Virginia	Active	
Tau	April 21, 1976 – 2009	University of Illinois Urbana-Champaign	Urbana, Illinois	Inactive	
Upsilon	197x ?–1982	Russell Sage College	Troy, New York	Inactive	
Phi	February 1, 1976 – 2015	University of Northern Colorado	Greeley, Colorado	Inactive	
Chi	197x ?–2017	University of Utah	Salt Lake City, Utah	Inactive	
Psi	197x ?–2002	Brigham Young University	Provo, Utah	Inactive	
**Omega**	197x ?	Illinois State University	Normal, Illinois	Active	
**Alpha Alpha**	May 2, 1976	Southern Illinois University Carbondale	Carbondale, Illinois	Active	
Alpha Beta	197x ?–1976	Kansas State University	Manhattan, Kansas	Inactive	
**Alpha Gamma**	197x ?	University of North Florida	Jacksonville, Florida	Active	
Alpha Delta	197x ?–202x ?	Florida State University	Tallahassee, Florida	Inactive	
Alpha Epsilon	197x ?–1982	University of New Mexico	Albuquerque, New Mexico	Inactive	
Alpha Zeta	197x ?–202x ?	California State University, Northridge	Northridge, California	Inactive	
Alpha Eta	197x ?–1996	Texas Tech University	Lubbock, Texas	Inactive	
Alpha Theta	197x ?–2013	Aldelphi University	Garden City, New York	Inactive	
Alpha Iota	December 1977 –20xx ?	University of Southern Mississippi	Hattiesburg, Mississippi	Inactive	
Alpha Kappa	197x ?–1994	University of Central Arkansas	Conway, Arkansas	Inactive	
**Alpha Lambda**	197x ?	University of Florida	Gainesville, Florida	Active	
Alpha Mu	197x ?–2010	University of Tennessee	Knoxville, Tennessee	Inactive	
Alpha Nu	May 1, 1978 – 202x ?	University of North Carolina at Greensboro	Greensboro, North Carolina	Inactive	
Alpha Xi	197x ?–1996	Pennsylvania State University	Monroeville, Pennsylvania	Inactive	
**Alpha Omicron**	197x ?	Temple University	Philadelphia, Pennsylvania	Active	
Alpha Pi	1978–202x ?	Texas A&M University	College Station, Texas	Inactive	
Alpha Rho	19xx ?–2010	Montclair State University	Montclair, New Jersey	Inactive	
Alpha Sigma	19xx ?–1987	Arizona State University	Tempe, Arizona	Inactive	
Alpha Tau	19xx ?–2001	Oregon State University	Corvallis, Oregon	Inactive	
Alpha Upsilon	19xx ?–2016	Central Washington University	Ellensburg, Washington	Inactive	
Alpha Phi	19xx ?–20xx ?	Texas Woman's University	Denton, Texas	Inactive	
Alpha Chi	19xx ?–20xx ?	St. Francis College	Brooklyn, New York	Inactive	
Alpha Psi	19xx ?–1996	Ohio State University	Columbus, Ohio	Inactive	
Alpha Omega	19xx ?–2020	University of Nebraska Omaha	Omaha, Nebraska	Inactive	
Beta Alpha	19xx ?–2015	University of Minnesota Duluth	Duluth, Minnesota	Inactive	
Beta Beta	19xx ?–1984	University of South Carolina	Columbia, South Carolina	Inactive	
Beta Gamma	19xx ?–1989	Bowling Green State University	Bowling Green, Ohio	Inactive	
**Beta Delta**	19xx ?	Eastern Michigan University	Ypsilanti, Michigan	Active	
**Beta Epsilon**	May 1980	University of Maine at Farmington	Farmington, Maine	Active	
**Beta Zeta**	1980	Towson University	Towson, Maryland	Active	
Beta Eta	198x ?–20xx ?	Sam Houston State University	Huntsville, Texas	Inactive	
**Beta Theta**	198x ?	East Carolina University	Greenville, North Carolina	Active	
Beta Iota	1981–1995	East Tennessee State University	Johnson City, Tennessee	Inactive	
Beta Kappa	198x ?–20xx ?	Minnesota State University, Mankato	Mankato, Minnesota	Inactive	
Beta Lambda	198x ?–1988	University of Oregon	Eugene, Oregon	Inactive	
Beta Mu	198x ?–1992	Northeastern University	Boston, Massachusetts	Inactive	
**Beta Nu**	April 18, 1982	Eastern Illinois University	Charleston, Illinois	Active	
Beta Xi	19xx ?–1999	West Chester University	West Chester, Pennsylvania	Inactive	
Beta Omicron	19xx ?–20xx ?	Worcester State University	Worcester, Massachusetts	Inactive	
Beta Pi	19xx ?–1996	University of Georgia	Athens, Georgia	Inactive	
Beta Rho	19xx ?–1997	Louisiana State University	Baton Rouge, Louisiana	Inactive	
Beta Sigma	19xx ?–20xx ?	Wayne State University	Detroit, Michigan	Inactive	
Beta Tau	19xx ?–202x ?	University of Arkansas	Fayetteville, Arkansas	Inactive	
Beta Upsilon	19xx ?–1984	Texas A&M University	College Station, Texas	Inactive	
**Beta Phi**	1984	University of Wisconsin–La Crosse	La Crosse, Wisconsin	Active	
Beta Chi	19xx ?–20xx ?	University of Alabama	Tuscaloosa, Alabama	Inactive	
**Beta Psi**	19xx ?	SUNY Brockport	Brockport, New York	Active	
Beta Omega	19xx ?–20xx ?	New Mexico State University	Las Cruces, New Mexico	Inactive	
Gamma Alpha	19xx ?–2002	Western Washington University	Bellingham, Washington	Inactive	
Gamma Beta	19xx ?–2001	University of Richmond	Richmond, Virginia	Inactive	
Gamma Gamma	19xx ?–1996	Virginia Tech	Blacksburg, Virginia	Inactive	
**Gamma Delta**	February 1987	Southern Illinois University Edwardsville	Edwardsville, Illinois	Active	
Gamma Epsilon	19xx ?–1995	Utah State University	Logan, Utah	Inactive	
Gamma Zeta	19xx ?	Plymouth State University	Plymouth, New Hampshire	Inactive	
**Gamma Eta**	19xx ?	University of Cincinnati	Cincinnati, Ohio	Active	
Gamma Theta	19xx ?	Youngstown State University	Youngstown, Ohio	Inactive	
Gamma Iota	19xx ?–2015	Georgia College & State University	Milledgeville, Georgia	Inactive	
**Gamma Kappa**	19xx ?	Liberty University	Lynchburg, Virginia	Active	
**Gamma Lambda**	19xx ?	University of Texas at El Paso	El Paso, Texas	Active	
**Gamma Mu**	19xx ?	Western Michigan University	Kalamazoo, Michigan	Active	
Gamma Nu	19xx ?–1997	University of Nevada, Reno	Reno, Nevada	Inactive	
Gamma Xi	19xx ?–20xx ?	East Stroudsburg University	East Stroudsburg, Pennsylvania	Inactive	
Gamma Omicron	19xx ?–2001	Springfield College	Springfield, Massachusetts	Inactive	
**Gamma Pi**	19xx ?	Hofstra University	Hempstead, New York	Active	
Gamma Rho	19xx ?–2016	Truman State University	Kirksville, Missouri	Inactive	
Gamma Sigma	19xx ?–1998	Appalachian State University	Boone, North Carolina	Inactive	
Gamma Tau	19xx ?–2011	University of North Texas	Denton, Texas	Inactive	
Gamma Upsilon	19xx ?–20xx ?	Georgia Southern University	Statesboro, Georgia	Inactive	
**Gamma Phi**	19xx ?	North Carolina Central University	Durham, North Carolina	Active	
**Gamma Chi**	19xx ?	Clemson University	Clemson, South Carolina	Active	
Gamma Psi	19xx ?–1988	Western Oregon State College	Monmouth, Oregon	Inactive	
Gamma Omega	19xx ?	William Paterson University	Wayne, New Jersey	Inactive	
Delta Alpha	19xx ?–2002	Iowa State University	Ames, Iowa	Inactive	
Delta Beta	19xx ?–20xx ?	University of Montana	Missoula, Montana	Inactive	
**Delta Gamma**	19xx ?	Cleveland State University	Cleveland, Ohio	Active	
Delta Delta	19xx ?	California State University, San Bernardino	San Bernardino, California	Inactive	
Delta Epsilon	19xx ?	Morgan State University	Baltimore, Maryland	Inactive	
Delta Zeta	19xx ?	Coastal Carolina University	Conway, South Carolina	Inactive	
Delta Eta	19xx ?	Ohio University	Athens, Ohio	Inactive	
Delta Theta	19xx ?	State University of New York at Potsdam	Potsdam, New York	Inactive	
**Delta Iota**	19xx ?	Southern Connecticut State University	New Haven, Connecticut	Active	
**Delta Kappa**	19xx ?	University of South Florida	Tampa, Florida	Active	
Delta Lambda	19xx ?–2020	Malone University	Canton, Ohio	Inactive	
Delta Mu	19xx ?–20xx ?	Morehead State University	Morehead, Kentucky	Inactive	
Delta Nu	19xx ?–2010	Idaho State University	Pocatello, Idaho	Inactive	
**Delta Xi**		University of Alabama	Tuscaloosa, Alabama	Active	
Delta Omicron		Lamar University	Beaumont, Texas	Inactive	
Delta Pi		Bridgewater State University	Bridgewater, Massachusetts	Inactive	
**Delta Rho**		California State University, Fullerton	Fullerton, California	Active	
**Delta Sigma**		Keene State College	Keene, New Hampshire	Active	
**Delta Tau**		Columbus State University	Columbus, Georgia	Active	
Delta Upsilon	xxxx ?–2011	University of Wisconsin-River Falls	River Falls, Wisconsin	Inactive	
**Delta Phi**	xxxx ?–2017	University of Michigan–Flint	Flint, Michigan	Active	
**Delta Chi**		Texas State University	San Marcos, Texas	Active	
Delta Psi		Northern Illinois University	DeKalb, Illinois	Inactive	
Delta Omega		University of Northern Iowa	Cedar Falls, Iowa	Inactive	
Epsilon Alpha		Baylor University	Waco, Texas	Inactive	
**Epsilon Beta**	2008	Rutgers University–New Brunswick	New Brunswick, New Jersey	Active	
**Epsilon Gamma**	2008	Monmouth University	West Long Branch, New Jersey	Active	
Epsilon Delta	2008–2012	University of Saskatchewan	Saskatoon, Saskatchewan, Canada	Inactive	
**Epsilon Epsilon**	2008	Prairie View A&M University	Prairie View, Texas	Active	
**Epsilon Zeta**	2008	Boise State University	Boise, Idaho	Active	
**Epsilon Eta**	2008	University of Scranton	Scranton, Pennsylvania	Active	
Epsilon Theta	20xx ?–20xx ?	Old Dominion University	Norfolk, Virginia	Inactive	
Epsilon Iota	20xx ?	George Mason University	Fairfax County, Virginia	Inactive	
**Epsilon Kappa**	20xx ?	University of Central Oklahoma	Edmond, Oklahoma	Active	
Epsilon Lambda	20xx ?	City University of New York	New York City, New York	Inactive	
Epsilon Mu	20xx ?	Charleston Southern University	North Charleston, South Carolina	Inactive	
**Epsilon Nu**	20xx ?	University of North Carolina at Chapel Hill	Chapel Hill, North Carolina	Active	
**Epsilon Xi**	20xx ?	Salisbury University	Salisbury, Maryland	Active	
Epsilon Omicron	20xx ?	California Baptist University	Riverside, California	Inactive	
Epsilon Pi	2021–2016, 2021	Bradley University	Peoria, Illinois	Inactive	
**Epsilon Rho**	2021	Otterbein University	Westerville, Ohio	Active	
**Epsilon Sigma**	2021	University of Tampa	Tampa, Florida	Active	
**Epsilon Tau**	2021	Austin Peay State University	Clarksville, Tennessee	Active	
**Epsilon Upsilon**	2021	State University of New York at Oswego	Oswego, New York	Active	
Epsilon Phi	2021	Miami University	Oxford, Ohio	Inactive	
Epsilon Chi	2021	Indiana University–Purdue University Indianapolis	Indianapolis, Indiana	Inactive	
Epsilon Psi	2021	University of Indianapolis	Indianapolis, Indiana	Inactive	
Epsilon Omega	2021			Inactive	
**Zeta Alpha** (see Zeta)	2021	The College of New Jersey	Ewing, New Jersey	Active	
Zeta Beta	202x ?	University of Massachusetts Lowell	Lowell, Massachusetts	Inactive	
**Zeta Gamma**	202x ?	Fayetteville State University	Fayetteville, North Carolina	Active	
**Zeta Delta**	202x ?	Hampton University	Hampton, Virginia	Active	
**Zeta Epsilon**	202x ?	Kennesaw State University	Cobb County, Georgia	Active	
