= Robert J. McDermott =

Dr. Robert J. McDermott received his B.S. in zoology from the University of Wisconsin–Madison in 1975. He subsequently earned his M.S. in 1977 and his Ph.D. in 1981, both in health education/curriculum and instruction from the same school. In 1981 he joined the faculty of the Department of Health Education at Southern Illinois University, Carbondale as an assistant professor. He was promoted to associate professor in 1985. While at SIUC he studied epidemiology under Robert Gold, David Duncan, and other notables.

Prof. McDermott came to the University of South Florida College of Public Health in 1986 as associate professor of public health and was promoted to full professor in 1992. He served as Assistant Dean for Research during the 1992-1993 academic year. He became Chair of the Department of Community and Family Health in 1993, serving until 2003, when he became Assistant Dean for Health Information and Communication.

In 1998, he led a College-wide effort that resulted in USF being awarded one of the nine Prevention Research Centers funded by the Centers for Disease Control and Prevention (CDC). Since that time he has co-directed the Florida Prevention Research Center, which is charged with developing and evaluating a community-based prevention marketing (CBPM) model. CBPM is an example of community-based participatory research that blends social marketing theories and techniques and community organization principles to guide voluntary health behavior change.

He has served as a member of the CDC's invited working group tasked to define health education in the 21st century and has been a consultant to the CDC's Division of School Health for collaboration with the Russian Federation. He has also been a visiting professor at two German universities, the University of Cologne and the University of Freiburg. He was Chair of the School Health Education and Services Section of the American Public Health Association and Chair of the Research Council of the American School Health Association.

Dr. McDermott was the founding editor of the Florida Public Health Review in 2003. He has been the editor-in-chief of Journal of School Health Education since 2011, and senior consulting editor of Health Behavior and Policy Review. In addition, Dr. McDermott is on the editorial board of the Journal of Health, Environment and Education (Germany). In addition to approximately 300 scientific articles, he has three books to his credit: Health Education Evaluation and Measurement: A Practitioner's Perspective, Connections for Health, and Health Information for Teachers: A College Course.

He was the recipient of the Mabel Lee Outstanding Young Professional Award for early career achievements awarded by the American Alliance for Health, Physical Education, Recreation and Dance. He has received both the Recognition Award and the Leadership Award from the School Health Education and Services Section of the American Public Health Association. He is recipient of the Award for Research of the American School Health Association's Research Council and the American Association for Health Education named him its Scholar for 1999. Dr. McDermott received the William A. Howe Award from the American School Health Association for his career achievements, the highest award bestowed by that organization. He was a founding Fellow of the American Academy of Health Behavior and has served as its President.

Although retired from the University of South Florida in 2012, Dr. McDermott carried out teaching activities at the University of Wisconsin-Madison, the University of Tampa, and the University of Maryland, before returning to Southern Illinois University Carbondale in 2017, where he oversaw accreditation of the SIUC's Master of Public Health program and served as Chair of the Department of Public Health and Recreation Professions. He is now retired.
