= Sven Lokrantz =

American physician (1892–1940)

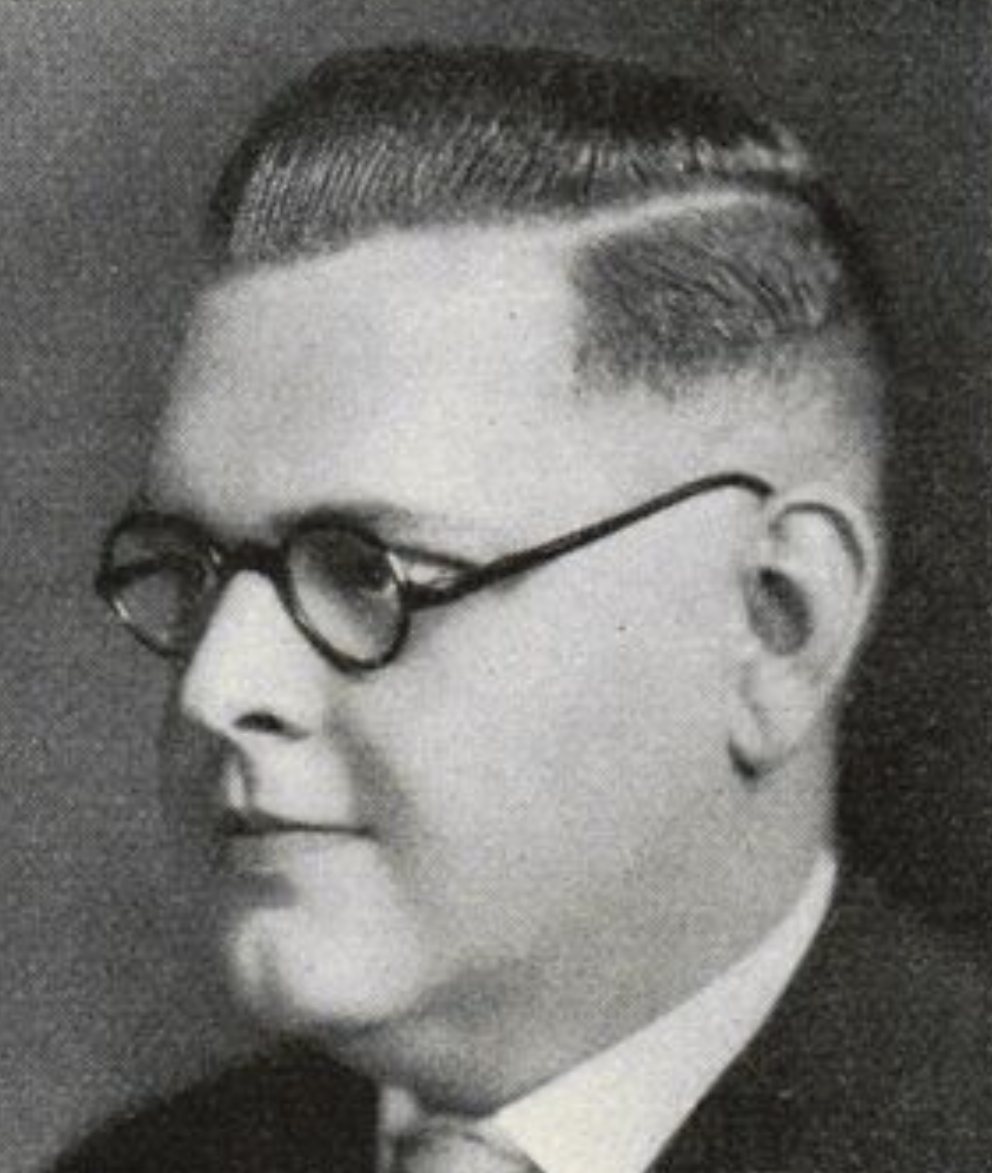
- Sven Lokrantz in Svenska män och kvinnor

President of the ASHA
- In office c. 1931–?

Personal details
- Born: September 22, 1892 Munsö, Sweden
- Died: March 11, 1940 (aged 47) Los Angeles, U.S.
- Spouse: Carolina Winston
- Relations: John Bandini Winston (father in-law)
- Children: Sven W. Lokrantz
- Parents: Axel Vilhelm Lokrantz (father); Elisabeth von Düben (mother)
- Education: Karolinska Institute; Tufts University School of Medicine

Sven Rickard Lokrantz (September 22, 1892 – March 11, 1940) was an American physician. He served as president of the American School Health Association (ASHA) and chairman of the Southern California Public Health Association.

Lokrantz became internationally known for the humanitarian ideas he introduced in the field of preventive school healthcare.

== Early life and education ==
Lokrantz was born in Munsö, Stockholm County, Sweden on September 22, 1892. His father was a landowner and his mother was born a friherrinna (baroness). Lokrantz studied at Södra Latin before attending the Unman Gymnastics Institute and Karolinska Institute. He later trained at his relative Adrian von Düben's gymnastics institute in London, and graduated from the College of Preceptors. In 1914, he emigrated to the United States. He enrolled at Tufts Medical School in Boston, Massachusetts, and earned a Doctor of Medicine degree in Boston in 1918.

== Career ==
In 1918, he opened a medical practice in Los Angeles, where he became the chief school physician and director of public health in 1924. In this role, he gained significant recognition and served as chief medical officer for the 1932 Summer Olympics, honorary chairman of the Swedish Olympic Committee for the Summer Games, and chairman of the American Association of School Physicians (American School Health Association) in 1931, and the Southern California Public Health Association. He was also the founder of the Ling Foundation.

== Recognition and public image ==
A school in the Los Angeles Unified School District, the Sven Lokrantz Special Education Center, bears his name and was designed by Sidney Eisenshtat in 1961.

Dr. Gunnar Dahl noted that children in Los Angeles had the highest standard of dental health in the United States. He attributed this primarily to the child health organization founded by Lokrantz, a model that was subsequently adopted nationwide.

Lokrantz was honored as a Knight of the Royal Order of the Polar Star.

== Personal life ==
Lokrantz's wife, Carolina Winston, was the granddaughter of James Brown Winston, the first medical officer of the City of Los Angeles. They married in 1923 and had a son, Sven Lokrantz Jr.

Lokrantz suffered from incurable heart disease, characterized by an enlarged heart.

== Death ==
Lokrantz died in Los Angeles on March 11, 1940, at the age of 47.

== Honours ==
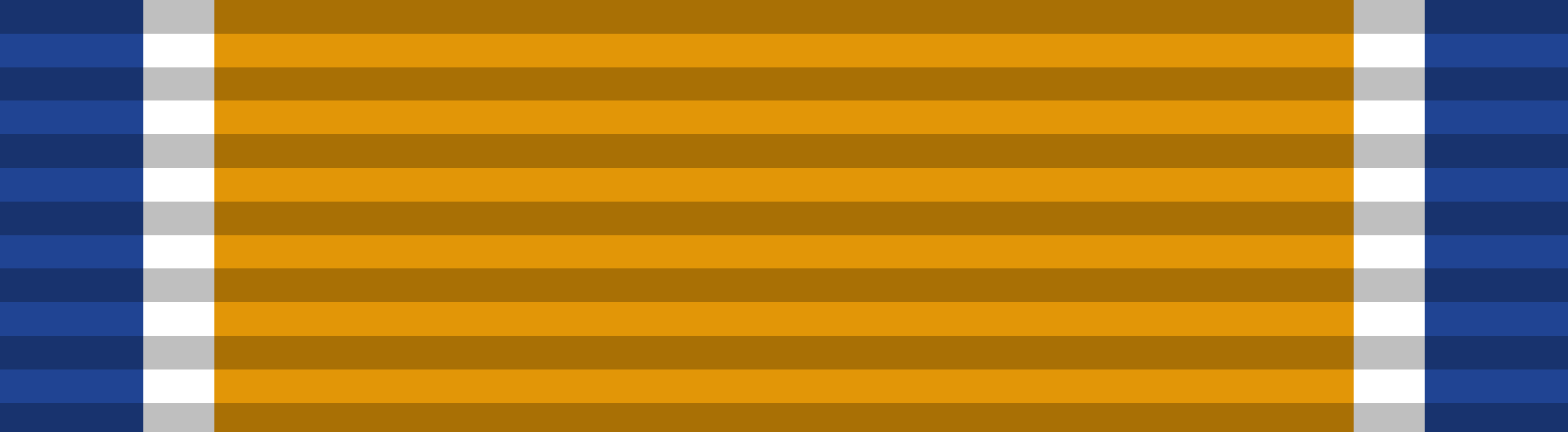
- Netherlands: Knight of the Order of Orange-Nassau
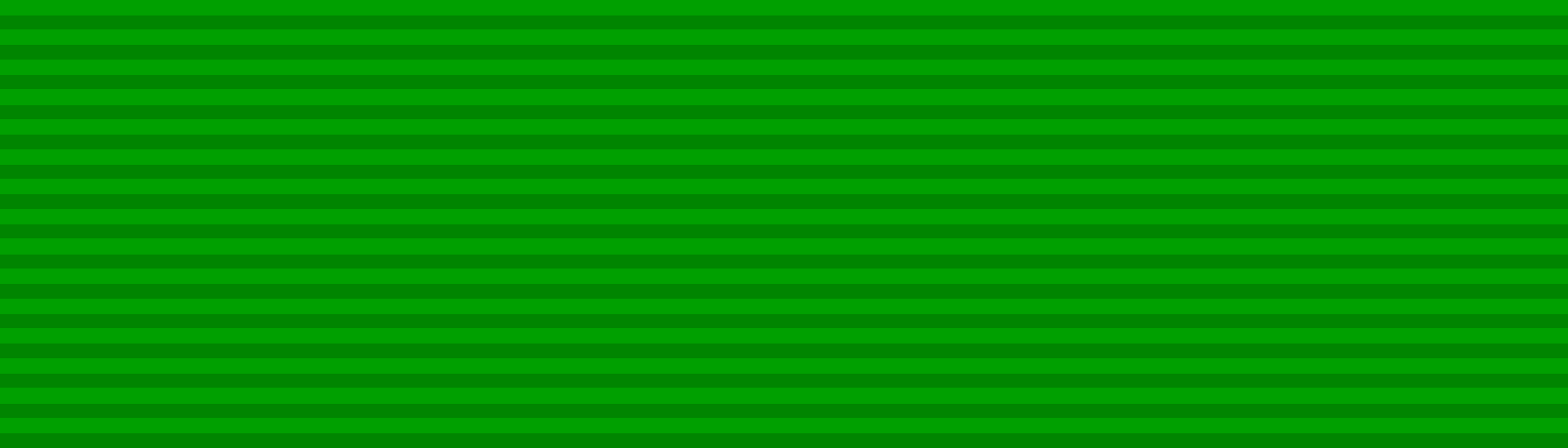
- Sweden: Order of Vasa
- Sweden: Order of the Polar Star

Olympic Games
Preceded by	Medical director of the Olympic Games; Los Angeles 1932	Succeeded by
