= Dental public health =

Prevention of oral disease and promotion of oral health

Dental public health is a para-clinical specialty of dentistry that deals with the prevention of oral disease and promotion of oral health. Dental public health is involved in the assessment of key dental health needs and coming up with effective solutions to improve the dental health of populations rather than individuals.

Dental public health seeks to reduce demand on health care systems by redirection of resources to priority areas. Countries around the world all face similar issues in relation to dental disease. Implementation of policies and principles varies due to availability of resources. Similar to public health, an understanding of the many factors that influence health will assist the implementation of effective strategies.

Dental-related diseases are largely preventable. Public health dentistry is often practiced through government-sponsored programs, usually directed to public-school children, following the premise that early education about oral hygiene is the best way to reach the general public. For example, a dental practitioner's annual visit to a local school to demonstrate proper tooth-brushing techniques.

In the 1970s, a more elaborate program emerged. It included a week of one-hour sessions of instruction, demonstration, and questions and answers, conducted by a dentist with a dental assistant and aided by a teacher who had previously been given several hours of instruction. Use was also made of televised dental health education programs, which parents were encouraged to observe.

== Background ==
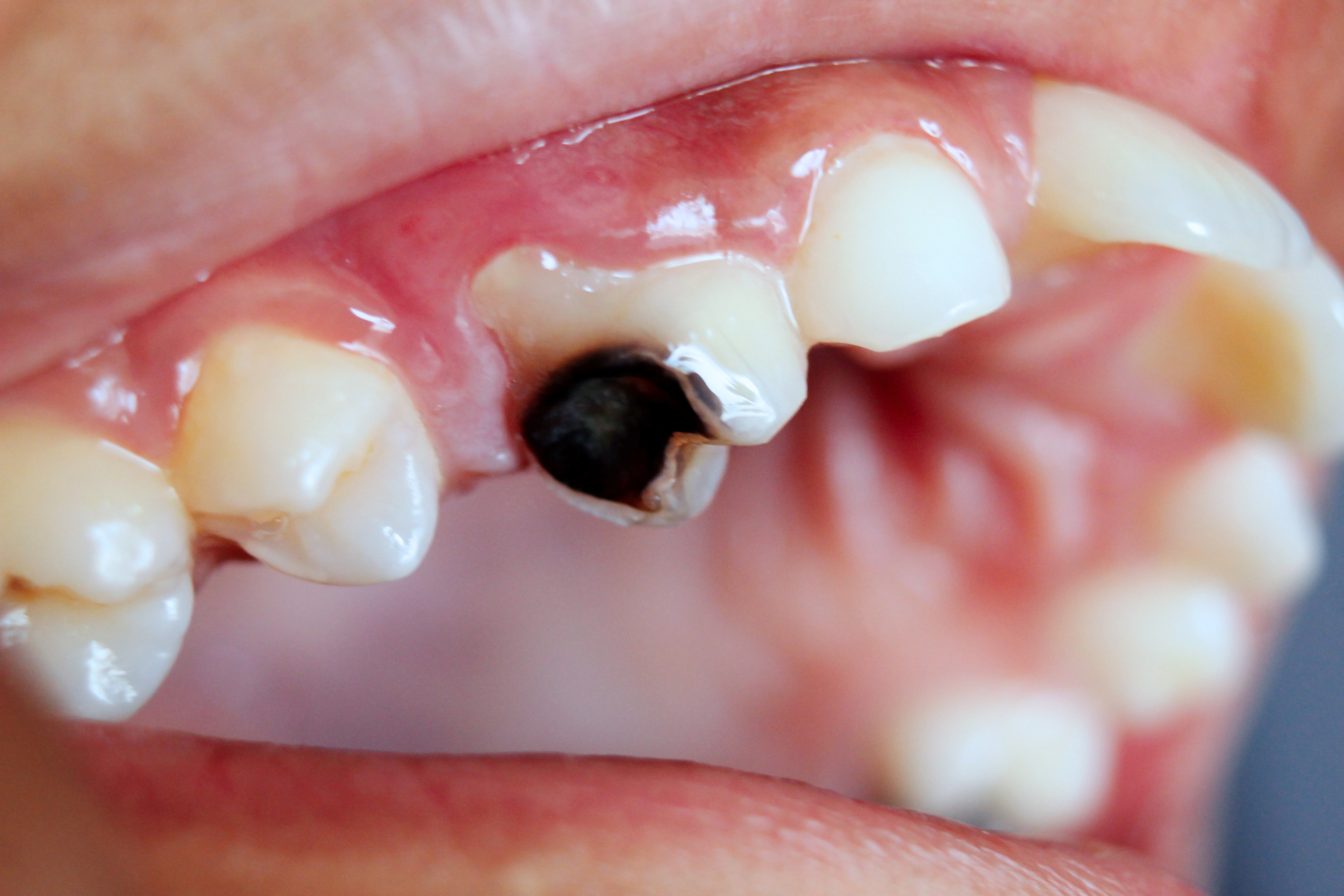
Dental Caries Cavity 2

Even with fluoridation and oral hygiene, tooth decay is still the most common diet–related disease affecting many people. Tooth decay has the economic impact of heart disease, obesity and diabetes.

Risk factors for tooth decay include physical, biological, environmental, behavioural, and lifestyle-related factors such as high numbers of cariogenic bacteria, inadequate salivary flow, insufficient fluoride exposure, poor oral hygiene, inappropriate methods of feeding infants, and poverty.

Cavities can develop on any surface of a tooth, but are most common inside the pits and fissures in grooves on chewing surfaces. The cause of tooth decay is the acid produced by bacteria that dissolves the hard tissues of the tooth (enamel, dentin, and cementum). The acid is produced by bacteria when they break down food residue or sugar on the tooth surface. This is where the toothbrush bristles and fluoride toothpaste cannot reach effectively.

One of the first signs of caries may be persistent tooth sensitivity. If a tooth reacts to hot, cold, or sweet foods and the sensation persists, this may indicate weakened enamel.

Gum diseases gingivitis and periodontitis are caused by certain types of bacteria that accumulate in remaining dental plaque. The extent of gum disease depends on host susceptibility.

Daily brushing must include brushing of both the teeth and gums. Effective brushing itself, will prevent progression of both tooth decay and gum diseases. Neutralising acids after eating and at least twice a day brushing with fluoridated toothpaste will assist preventing dental decay. Stimulating saliva flow assists in the remineralisation process of teeth, this can be done by chewing sugar free gum. Using an interdental device once daily will assist prevention of gum diseases.

Professional oral hygiene includes regular dental check-ups and professional prophylaxis (teeth cleaning). Sometimes complete removal of dental plaque is difficult, and the help of a dentist or hygienist may be required.

Fissure sealants applied over the chewing surfaces of teeth, block plaque from being trapped inside pits and fissures. The sealants make brushing more effective and prevent acid demineralisation and tooth decay. A diet low in fermentable carbohydrates will reduce the buildup of plaque on teeth.

== Practice ==
=== Competencies ===
The American Board of Dental Public Health devised a list of competencies for dental public health specialists to follow. Dental public health specialists are a select group of certified dentists. The ten competencies allow for growth and learning of individuals and set expectations for the future. An advantage of the design is that they are implementable on a global level. The list is updated periodically.

1998 competencies	2016 competencies
1. Plan oral health programs for populations	1. Manage oral health programs for population health
2. Select interventions and strategies for the prevention and control of oral diseases and promotion of oral health	2. Demonstrate ethical decision-making in the practice of dental public health
3. Develop resources, implement and manage oral health programs for populations	3. Evaluate systems of care that impact oral health
4. Incorporate ethical standards in oral health programs and activities	4. Design surveillance systems to measure oral health status and its determinants
5. Evaluate and monitor dental care delivery systems	5. Communicate on oral and public health issues
6. Design and understand the use of surveillance systems to monitor oral health	6. Lead collaborations on oral and public health issues
7. Communicate and collaborate with groups and individuals on oral health issues	7. Advocate for public health policy, legislation, and regulations to protect and promote the public's oral health, and overall health
8. Advocate for public health policy, legislation, and regulations to protect and promote the public's oral health, and overall health	8. Critically appraise evidence to address oral health issues for individuals and populations
9. Critique and synthesize scientific literature	9. Conduct research to address oral and public health problems
10. Design and conduct population-based studies to answer oral and public health questions	10. Integrate the social determinants of health into dental health practice

=== Scope ===
Major areas of dental public health activity include:

- Oral health surveillance

National Oral Health Surveillance system (NOHSS) is designed to monitor the effects of oral disease on the population, as well as monitor how the oral care is delivered. Additionally, the status of water fluoridation on both a state and a national level is continually supervised.

- Assessing the evidence on oral health and dental interventions, programmes, and services
- Policy and strategy development and implementation
- Oral health improvement
- Health and public protection
- Developing and monitoring quality dental services
- Dental public health intelligence
- Academic dental public health
- Role within health services

== Principles and criteria ==
Dental health is concerned with promoting health of an entire population and focuses on an action at a community level, rather than at an individual clinical approach. Dental public health is a broad subject that seeks to expand the range of factors that influences peoples oral health and the most effective means of preventing and treating these oral health problems.

To allow a health problem to be properly managed, a set of rules or criteria may determine what is defined as a public health problem and what is the best way to manage health problems in communities. Once these questions have been answered, the way a public health problem is acted upon to protect a population can be determined.

== Approaches to prevention ==
=== Fluoridation of drinking water ===
Water fluoridation is the implementation of artificial fluoride in public water supplies with the intentions to halt the progression of dental diseases. Fluoride has the ability to interfere with the demineralisation and remineralisation process that occurs on the tooth surface and improves the mineral intake when the pH level may reduce below the neutral pH level.

This achievement was implemented through the public health development in the 19th, 20th century and led into the 21st century. Research into the effects of fluoride on teeth began due to the concern about the presence of dental fluorosis.

Many clinical case trials occurred in the beginning of the 20th century. However, the very first clinical trial to have occurred dates back to the 19th century when Denninger conducted a trial prescribing children and pregnant women with calcium fluoride. From this trial, it was recognised fluoride's significance on tooth tissue. From this point, many clinical trials were conducted Following these studies, the recognition of the positive outcome on dental tissues became clear and projects in water fluoridation became of significant importance.

The development of artificial water fluoridation began in 1945 in Grand Rapids, Michigan followed by Newburgh, New York and Evanston, Illinois. In 1955, three towns Watford, Kilmarnock and Anglesey trialled the water fluoridation implementation scheme. In 1960, the Republic of Ireland implemented all public water supplies with artificial fluoridated water and four years later extending this into the main cities of Dublin and Cork.

40 countries have fluoridated water schemes implemented. Fluoride is still yet to be completely implemented across the full population. Progress is slowly improving and access is becoming more common.

The world extent of water fluoridation.

Country	Population with fluoridated water
Argentina	21%
Australia	61%
Brazil	41%
Canada	43%
Chile	40%
Columbia	80%
Hong Kong	100%
Israel	75%
Malaysia	70%
New Zealand	61%
Panama	18%
Republic of Ireland	73%
Singapore	100%
Spain	10%
United Kingdom	10%
United States	74.4%

=== Career ===
Prevention methods such as oral health promotion began with the education of clinicians and the population in the health promotion strategies. Since the mid 19th century, oral health practice has revolved more around prevention and education rather than treatment of disease. This education can be focused towards dental practitioners and to the wider population who may interested.

There has been a change in focus in the education of developing clinicians all over the world. The first dental school was developed in 1828 and was followed by an ever-growing field of practice. The dental practice began with its main focus on the treatment of oral disease and branched into a wide scope of practice with many dental occupations involved.

The most common form of dental clinicians are either general dentists, oral health therapists, dental therapists and dental hygienist. When desired, some of these clinicians may seek further experience in projects that may assist the dental public system in bringing further awareness to prevention of dental diseases.

Oral health prevention is the current form of practice of many clinicians. Health professionals generally prefer education in oral care to the population to the treatment of the disease. Dental university education develops clinicians to focus on the education of patients, education of the community and a wider population using different approaches.

== Approaches to promotion ==
Oral health promotion outlines the strategies for improving and educating the general public about how they can better take improve and maintain their current oral health. Oral health promotion is part of both government and private incentives to create a healthier and better educated generation of individuals.

Below are the nine key principles involved for oral health promotion:

Empowerment	Individuals, groups and communities are given the ability to exercise more control over the personal, socioeconomics, and environmental factors through interventions that affect their oral health.
Participatory	Key stakeholders that are invested in the intervention program should be actively participating in the stages of planning, implementing and evaluating interventions.
Holistic	Common risks and conditions of oral health, general health and inequalities should be taken into consideration of a broad intervention approach.
Inter-sectoral	Collaboration between all relevant agencies and sectors is paramount as it allows oral health improvement to be implemented upon the wider public health agenda.
Equity	It is important to place an emphasis on Oral health inequalities when planning interventions for oral health improvement.
Evidence base	Future interventions of oral health improvement should be implemented through existing knowledge of effectiveness and good practice of oral health.
Sustainable	The measures of whether individuals, groups and communities of achieving long-term oral health improvement can be maintained.
Multi-strategy	It is imperative to perform a range of complementary actions such as health public policies, community development and environmental change in order to address the underlying determinants of oral health.
Evaluation	Adequate resources in conjunction with suitable methods should be present for effective assessment of oral health interventions.

Three ways to achieve oral health promotion include addressing the determinants of oral health, ensuring community participation, and implementing a strategy approach that involves a range of complementary actions.

=== Determinants of oral health ===
Oral health promotion focuses on individual behaviour, socioeconomic status and environmental factors. Underlying determinants, including non-milk extrinsic sugars consumption, alcohol consumption and smoking, can impact oral health.

The ability to remove dental plaque, exposure to fluoride and access to quality dental care can affect the ways the aforementioned underlying factors are and can be modified to the needs of the individual to obtain optimum oral health. Ways in which oral health promotion can minimise the effects of these determinants include:

- Promoting healthy eating.
- Teaching effective oral hygiene practices.
- Promoting the use of topical fluoride for preventing and control of dental caries.
- Facilitating early access to preventative dental services.

These factors are also influenced by sociopolitical considerations that are outside the control of most individuals.

Community participation is a key factor in oral health promotion. Inter-sectoral collaboration is where relevant agencies and sectors are involved in partnership to identify key oral health issues and to implement new methods to improve oral health.

The World Health Organization has agreed on a health promotion approach as the foundation for oral health improvement strategies and policies for the population. Oral health promotion is based on the principles of the framework, Ottawa Charter. There are five areas of action outlined to achieve oral health promotion; building Health public policy, creating supportive environment, strengthening community action, developing personal skills, re-orienting healthcare services.

== Research ==
=== Oral health in care homes ===
A study investigating the efficacy of staff workers' oral care education on improving the oral health of care home residents found that despite the education and training of care workers, certain ongoing barriers prevented them from conducting the necessary daily oral hygiene care for the residents. The most frequently listed obstacles to care included the residents' bad breath, inadequate time to perform oral care and uncooperative residents who do not perceive the need for oral care.

Another study on the effects of oral health educational interventions for nursing home staff or residents, or both, to maintain or improve the oral health for nursing home residents shows insufficient supporting evidence.

=== School dental screening programs ===
It is unclear whether or not school screening programs improve attendance at the dentist. There is low-certainty evidence that school screening initiatives with incentives attached, such as free treatment, may be helpful in improving oral health of children.

=== One-to-one oral hygiene advice provided in a dental setting for oral health ===
One-to-one oral hygiene advice (OHA) is often given on a regular basis to motivate individuals and to improve one's oral health. However, it is still unclear if one-to-one OHA in a dental settings is effective in improving one's oral health. Regardless of the increased oral hygiene education programs in schools due to the higher quality of life, there is an increased intake of processed food, especially of sweetened beverages. The favorable effect of the increased level of dental health education may be counteracted by nutritional behavior, especially sweets intake and low attendance of regular dental office check-ups and insufficient oral health practices (tooth brushing) generating a still increased caries prevalence and DMFT index in adolescents. Irregular dental check-up and sugary dietary habits were associated with high prevalence the occurrence of dental conditions as assessed by the decayed, missing (due to caries), and filled teeth (DMFT) index.

=== Community-based population level interventions for promoting child oral health ===
A systematic review sought to determine the effectiveness of different interventions in preventing dental caries in children and when was the most effective time to intervene during childhood. Overall, the evidence showed low certainty that combining oral health education alongside supervised tooth-brushing or professional intervention would reduce dental caries in children (from birth to 18). The most effective time to intervene in childhood was still unclear as well. Improving the diets of children and the access to fluoride showed only a limited impact to improving the oral health of children.

== Examples ==
=== Australia ===
==== Child Dental Benefits Schedule (CDBS) ====
- A Government funded program which provides assistance for basic dental services for children aged 2–17 years. Services provided include: examinations, dental x-rays, cleaning, fissure sealants, fillings, extractions and root canals
- The CDBS is means tested, those who qualify are eligible to $1,000 of the aforementioned treatments over a two-year period.

To find out if a child is eligible, families can contact the Department of Human Services

==== National Partnership Agreement on Adult Public Dental Services ====
- As part of the National Partnership Agreement on Adult Public Dental Services, between 2015- 2016 $155 million was provided to service around 178,000 adult public patients
- On 15 December 2016, a further $320 million was provided by the Australian Government for dental services to public adult patients; the funding is to last for three years.

=== Autonomous Region of Madeira - Portugal ===
In 1985 three dentists with the sponsorship of Colonel Joy Wheeler Dow, Jr., implemented an Oral Health Program in the Autonomous Region of Madeira with the aid of five assistants.

The four-year program reached 15,000 children around the main island and Porto Santo and it included Oral Hygiene Instruction classes, informative literature including films, fortnightly fluoride mouth-rinse and daily fluoride tables with the collaboration of the school teachers.

During this period a study was undertaken using the World Health Organization (WHO) Combined Oral Health Assessment (CPTIN) plan resulting in the final report where it was found that there had been a decrease of 44% in the need for fillings, 40% decrease in the need for extractions, whilst the caries free children population grew from the initial 1% to 5%.

=== United Kingdom ===
==== National Health Service (NHS) dentistry ====
National Health Service (NHS) is the name of the public health services of England, Scotland and Wales and is directly funded from taxation. The dentistry services are available to all, regardless of wealth. In order to find a NHS dentist search NHS Dentist Near You Some clinics may not have the capacity to take on new patients so waiting lists may occur.

- Availability of treatment

All treatment deemed necessary to maintain optimal oral health will be provided by the dentist, however not all treatments will be funded by the Dentistry NHS and will incur private fees.

- Fees

Dentistry performed under the Dentistry NHS will involve fees, however are heavily subsidized by the government, below is some information which explains how the fee system works, only one charge is required per treatment course of care, regardless of the amount of appointments needed.

Course of Care	Fee	Treatment involved
Emergency	£25.80	An urgent course of treatment may be followed up by adivce to make another appointment for a separate course of non-urgent treatment.
Band 1	£25.80	Covers an examination, diagnosis and advice. If necessary, it also includes X-rays, a scale and polish (if clinically needed), and planning for further treatment.
Band 2	£70.70	Covers all treatment included in Band 1, plus additional treatment, such as fillings, root canal treatment and removing teeth (extractions).
Band 3	£306.80	Covers all treatment included in Bands 1 and 2, plus more complex procedures, such as crowns, dentures and bridges.

=== Nepal ===
Nepalese population is at a greater disadvantage than westernized societies in terms of oral health. The benefit of implementing health insurance is to assist a large number of people with similar risks by sharing funding. In Nepal, implementing health insurance is difficult due to limited supply of finances. To assist families with accessing health care "elimination of direct payments is necessary but is not sufficient alone; costs of transportation and loss of income can have more impact than direct payment of services" must be considered.

==== Education ====
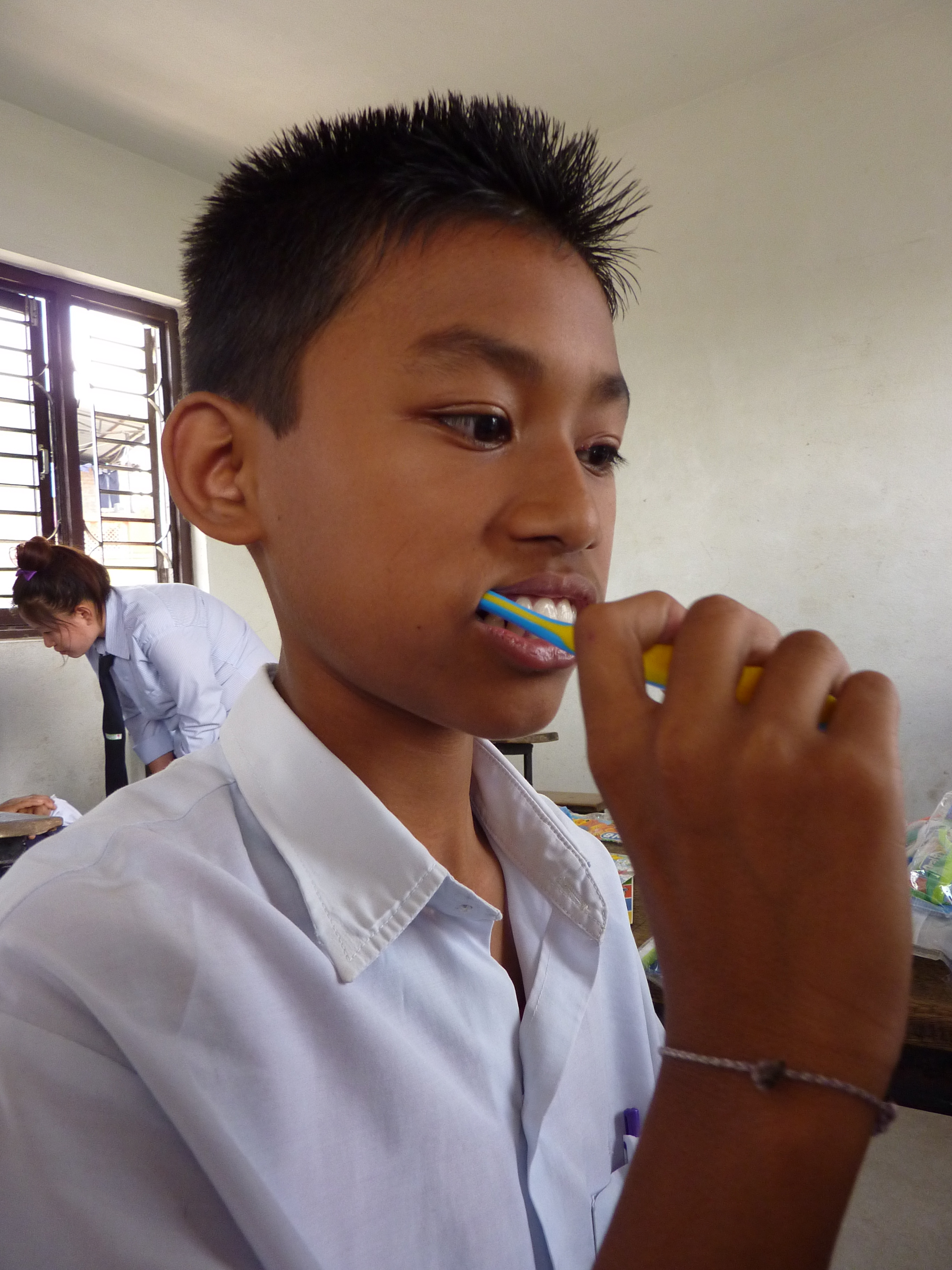
Oral Health Promotion in Nepal - teaching children

- The amount of dental professionals produced from tertiary education has increased in Nepal over the years, but remains low in comparison to the rest of the world. There were approximately only 100 dentists in the workforce in the year 2000, which has increased to 240 in the present.
- Nepal is now using dental hygienists, therapists and oral health therapists to increase access to dental treatment.
- Programs such as training rural women about oral health promotion are being utilized to increase awareness of basic dental problems in remote areas.

==== Dental outreach program ====
- Attempts to reduce the gap in dental health of Nepalese people through volunteer work provides oral health care education and basic treatment to small villages.
- Services provided include oral hygiene instruction, distribution of free toothbrush and fluoride toothpaste, application of fluoride gel, application of sealant, screening and charting out treatment plan under a supervising dentist, scaling, filling, extraction, prescribing medicine, and free dispensing distributing medicines

For more information, you can access the Around Good People fact sheet

== Early history ==
The earliest known person identified as a dental practitioner dates back to 2600BC, an Egyptian scribe states that he was 'the greatest of those who deal with teeth ad of physicians'

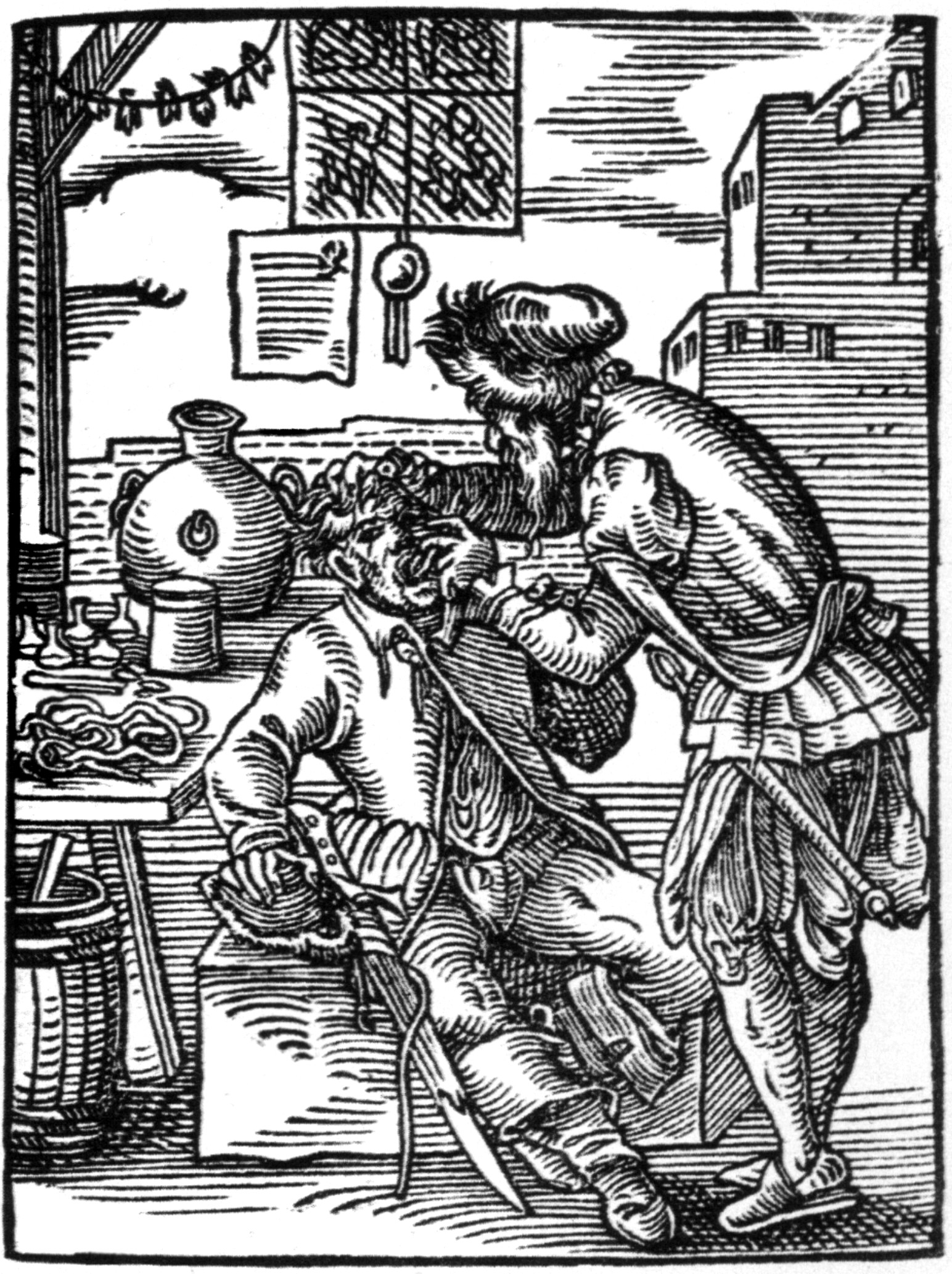
Older barber-dentist

- 1500BC- Egyptian Ebers papyrus explains oral disease and offers prescription for strengthening teeth and gums
- 9th century AD- The Arabs discussed the care of teeth rather than extractions and replacement. Mouth hygiene was established with a small wooden stick
- Late 1400s- The first tooth brush was invented by the Chinese
- 1723- A French surgeon describes a comprehensive care system for dentistry including restorative techniques and denture reconstruction
- 1791- The first dental treatment available for the poor, established in New York City
- 1840- The world's first national dental organisation was founded
- 1861- Philadelphian charity hospital offers dental services
- 1865- First ever children's dental clinic, established in Germany
- 1867- Boston opened its first low income dental clinic
- 1884- The term Oral Hygiene come about when ML Rhein asks dentists to teach patients how to brush their teeth
- 1890- A committee in England carried out oral hygiene promotion in schools
- 1896- The powerful slogan 'A clean tooth never decays' helps improves standards of mouth hygiene
- 1931- Fluoride is identified
- 1944- UK Education Act 1944 made it compulsory for children at primary and secondary schools to have dental inspections leading to the provision of a School Dental Service
- 1945- First ever water fluoridation
- 1969- World Health Organization (WHO) establishes a data bank which collect information on dental health and needs
- 1996- WHO Oral Health Country/Area Profile Program (CAPP) is established, this online database presents information on individual countries oral health services and oral disease rates

== See also ==
- Health
- Mouth breathing
- National Smile Month
- Obligate nasal breathing
- Public health
- Preventive healthcare
- Water fluoridation
