= American School Hygiene Association =

US professional organization

An outgrowth of the school hygiene movement, the American School Hygiene Association (ASCHA) was a professional organization of physicians, dentists, administrators, nurses, and other stakeholders in the health and well-being of school children. Formed in 1906, it involved reformers and politicians of the Progressive movement era, and was active in school health and advocacy issues until its last congress in 1921.

== Formation ==
ASCHA had its birth with a New York City meeting of health care and school personnel on December 3, 1906. The association was formed to "stimulate research and promote discussion of the problem of school hygiene" and "to take an active part in movements wisely aiming to improve the hygienic conditions surrounding children during school life." The stated goal of the association was:

"that in every city and town adequate provision should be made, both for the sanitary inspection of schools and for medical inspection, the latter to include not only inspection for contagious diseases, but also of eyes, ears, teeth, throat, and nose, and of general physical condition ... That all schools having courses for the training of teachers should give instruction in (a) personal and school hygiene, and (b) the principles and practice of physical training, and that each of these subjects should be given as much time as the major subjects in the course."

-The Progressive Era's Health Reform Movement: a Historical Dictionary

Founding members included Hermann Biggs, Irving Fisher, Henry Goddard, Luther Gulick, and Adolf Meyer.

== Membership and activity ==
Progressive movement era President Theodore Roosevelt was honorary president of ASCHA from 1907 to 1908, and in 1909 he convened the first White House Conference on the Care of Dependent Children.

ASCHA had thirteen congresses (or conferences), along with published proceedings, from its inception, which promoted "programs focusing upon a healthy school environment, including proper sanitation, the screening of children for health problems, and adequate health instruction."

In 1912, it partnered with the American Medical Association (AMA) to establish "teaching of practical physiology and hygiene in public and private schools."

The final congress of the ASCHA was in 1921.

== Legacy ==
While many schools during this era adopted only physical education instead of a comprehensive school health education, ASCHA "helped shape the developing school hygiene education movement." Some of its members went on to form the American Association of School Physicians in 1926, which in 1936 was renamed the American School Health Association (ASHA). ASHA is still active in the advocacy and research of school health-related issues.

== See also ==
- School hygiene
- Hygiene
- School health education
- Public health
