= James H. Price (academic) =

American academic

James H. Price is an American academic who works in the fields of health education and public health. He is an emeritus professor of Health Education and Public Health at the University of Toledo, where he was the chair of the College of Graduate Studies from 1994–95 and 2000–01. He has served as the editor-in-chief of the American Journal of Health Education and the Journal of School Health, and as the president of the American School Health Association. His research includes studies on the approval for concealed handguns on college campuses among college professors and students, and the health costs of exposure to secondhand smoke.
