= Journal of School Health =

- Discipline: Education, pediatrics, school hygiene
- Language: English
- Edited by: Robert J. McDermott

Publication details
- History: 1930-present
- Publisher: Wiley-Blackwell on behalf of the American School Health Association (United States)
- Frequency: Monthly
- Impact factor: 1.673 (2019)

Standard abbreviations
- ISO 4: J. Sch. Health

Indexing
- CODEN: JSHEA2
- ISSN: 1746-1561

Links
- Journal homepage; Online access; Online archive

The Journal of School Health is a monthly peer-reviewed academic journal covering the health of school students. It was established in 1930 as the School Physicians' Bulletin, obtaining its current name in 1937. It is published by Wiley-Blackwell on behalf of the American School Health Association. The editor-in-chief is Robert J. McDermott. According to the Journal Citation Reports, the journal has a 2014 impact factor of 1.434, ranking it 11th out of 37 journals in the category "Education Scientific Disciplines".
