= School hygiene =

Health education in schools

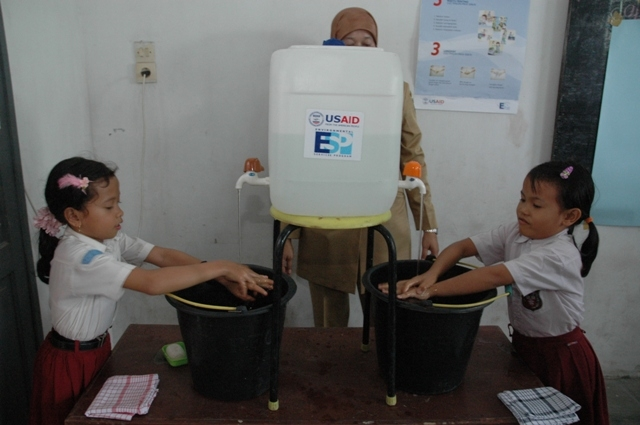
Pupils in Medan, Indonesia, practice handwashing in class

School hygiene or school hygiene education is a healthcare science and a form of school health education. The primary aim of school hygiene education is to improve behaviour through hygienic practices connected to personal, water, food, domestic, and public hygiene. It also aims to protect water and food supplies and to manage environmental factors safely.

== History of school hygiene ==
In his 1915 work School Hygiene, school hygiene expert Fletcher B. Dresslar defined school hygiene as "the branch of this science [hygiene] which has to do with the conservation and development of the health of school children".

The school was looked upon as existing "not only for the welfare of each child in attendance but also for the welfare of the state and the nation". Dresslar broke school hygiene up into two essential parts: "the physical environment of the child during his school life" and "the laws of mental hygiene as illustrated by the proper adjustment of the subjects of the curriculum to the mental powers and needs of the children".

School hygiene emerged as a significant discipline in the United States and England during the late 19th and early 20th centuries, reaching its peak influence in this period, with significant works on the subject being offered by various authors, among them Sir Arthur Newsholme, Edward R. Shaw, Robert A. Lyster, and G.G. Groff. After this period, the school hygiene discipline became part of a comprehensive look at school health education; the American School Hygiene Association became inactive, and the American School Health Association was founded. Exclusive focus on hygiene was no longer prominent. School hygiene is still an active, separate discipline in other parts of the world, like Eastern Europe and developing countries where school sanitation norms are not as well established.

== School environment ==
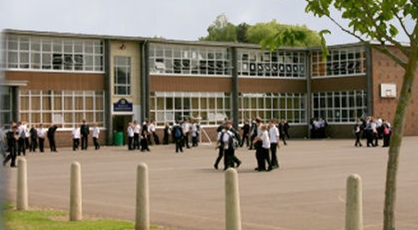
The main secondary school building is in Abingdon, Oxfordshire, England.

Schools can determine children's health and well-being by their exposure to a healthy or unhealthy school environment. There are a lot of architectural and aesthetic aspects related to a school's hygienic needs, such as the school's building plan, safe water supply, disposal of waste, emergency lighting, heating and ventilation, as well as adequate school facilities (halls, classrooms, and common areas) and furniture.

=== School location ===
For health reasons (influence of noise, exhaust gases from vehicles, and potential risk of accident), schools in urban and peri-urban areas should be located more than ers away from significant traffic and causeways. Some studies suggest it is best to orient and design a school building so that natural light can be a part of the lighting scheme of the school, and that buildings should avoid being placed in a valley, due to air quality issues.

Water supply within the school environment is a critical part of school-based WASH interventions to combat the rate of diarrhoeal diseases among pupils. Pupils who attend schools with inadequate water supply (in which there are no water sources within a 1 km radius during the dry season) that receive WASH interventions (including water supply and water treatment improvements, hygiene promotion and sanitation improvements) usually experience a reduction in diarrhoeal incidences.

== Importance of school hygiene ==
Schools have a central place in the health of a community. Inappropriate hygiene in schools can cause many diseases. If there are no school sanitation and hygiene facilities, or if they are not maintained and used adequately, schools become places where diseases are likely to be transmitted.

Diseases associated with inadequate water supply and poor sanitation and hygiene are prevalent within developing countries. Most diarrhoeal diseases in these areas are caused by inadequate and unsafe water supply and poor sanitation and hygiene facilities. Children who have adequate water, sanitation and hygiene facilities at school are more able to integrate hygiene education into their daily lives and are effective behaviour change communicators' in their communities. While communities whose school children have been exposed to disease risk due to inadequate supply of water, sanitation and hygiene services are more at risk. Families are left to bear the burden of their children's illness due to bad conditions at school.

Improved school WASH conditions help to improve student's school attendance; most importantly, inclusive WASH for girls who are menstruating and reducing the transmission of illnesses greatly helps boost school attendance. Evidence has also shown that improved handwashing with soap at school can reduce illness in school going children, ultimately leading to the reduction of absenteeism from school.

Children with disabilities, irrespective of gender, are likely to be affected more than their able-bodied counterparts by inadequate water, sanitation and hygiene conditions in schools, a significant contributing factor to inequality in learning opportunities. Lack of adequate, separate toilets that offer privacy, security and washing facilities may discourage parents from sending vulnerable children (children with disabilities and girls) to school.

From a human rights perspective, WASH in schools is considered necessary. Access to WASH facilities and hygiene behaviour change education in schools contributes to inclusion, dignity, and equity. The Sustainable Development Goals (SDGs) mainly highlight the need to expand WASH interventions beyond the household setting in the effort to achieve universal and equitable access to safe and affordable drinking water, sanitation and hygiene for all.

== See also ==
- American School Hygiene Association
- Public health
- School health education
- WASH (water, sanitation and hygiene)
