= McGovern-Dole International Food for Education and Child Nutrition Program =

The McGovern-Dole International Food for Education and Child Nutrition Program (IFEP) is a food aid program authorized in the Farm Security and Rural Investment Act of 2002 (P.L. 107–171, Sec. 3107, known as the 2002 Farm Bill) which provides for the donation of U.S. agricultural commodities and associated financial and technical assistance to carry out preschool and school feeding programs in foreign countries. Maternal, infant, and child nutrition programs also are authorized under this program. It is named after former U.S. senators George McGovern and Bob Dole, who advocated in the U.S. Congress for its passage.

The program provided more than 22 million school meals to children in 41 countries over its first eight years. It was also credited with improving school attendance, especially among girls, who were more likely to be allowed to go to school if a meal was being provided. It continues on and is internationally popular. In 2008, McGovern and Dole were made World Food Prize laureates for their efforts to curb hunger in the world and in particular for this program.

== Background ==
IFED began in FY2000 as a pilot project and was called Global Food for Education Initiative (GFEI). The project used the donation of surplus agricultural commodities under Section 416 of the Agricultural Act of 1949 (P.L. 89-439, as amended) to support a global school feeding program. It was initially funded with $300 million in 2000 and known as GFEI until 2002, when it was incorporated into the 2002 farm bill under its present name.

== Funding history ==
The program was first implemented in FY2003 with $100 million of Commodity Credit Corporation funds as stipulated in the 2002 farm bill. Beginning in FY2004, the authorizing statute provides for the program to be carried out with appropriated funding. The FY2004 agricultural appropriations act (P.L. 108–199) provided $50 million to carry out the program.

Subsequent funding was generally at $100 million a year. There were attempts to give it more permanent funding levels during 2007 and 2008. and it received an additional $80 million in 2009. By 2011–2012, the funding level was around $200 million per year. It was also credited with improving school attendance, especially among girls, who were more likely to be allowed to go to school if a meal was being provided.

The 2018 budget outline of the Trump administration eliminated funding for the program, stating that it "lacks evidence that it is being effectively implemented to reduce food insecurity". However the outline was nondeterminative and the program continued on. For FY2020, the funding level for the program was at $215 million.

Up to 10% of funding for the program is available for local and regional procurement of agricultural commodities rather than in-kind donations of U.S. products. Local and regional procurement was first allowed in 2018, and this shift is intended to support local economies.

== See also ==
- School feeding in low-income countries
