= Eta Sigma Gamma =

American honor society for health education

- ΗΣΓ
- Founded: August 14, 1967; 58 years ago Ball State University
- Type: Professional
- Affiliation: Independent
- Status: Active
- Emphasis: Health education
- Scope: National
- Pillars: Education, Research, Service, Advocacy
- Colors: Dark green and Gold
- Flower: Trillium
- Publication: The Health Educator; The Vision
- Chapters: 85
- Headquarters: c/o Denise Seabert; 9259 N Bayford Street; Fresno, California 93720; United States
- Website: etasigmagamma.org

Eta Sigma Gamma (ΗΣΓ or ESG) is an American honor society for health education. It was founded in 1967 at Ball State University in Muncie, Indiana. It has established more than 85 chapters in the United States.

== History ==
Eta Sigma Gamma (ESG) was founded at Ball State University in Muncie, Indiana. Its founders were Warren Schaller, chairman of the department of physiology and health science; Robert Synovitz and William Bock, both associate professors of the department of physiology and health science. The founding mission of ESG was "to further the professional competence and dedication of individual members in the health science discipline and the promotion of this discipline."

It was formally incorporated in the State of Indiana on August 14, 1967. The installation of the Alpha chapter occurred on May 12, 1968. Twenty-one current Ball State students, four former Ball State students, and five faculty members were installed as the charter members of Alpha chapter.

In 1999, Eta Sigma Gamma became a member of the Coalition of National Health Education Organizations in the United States. In joining the coalition, Epsilon Sigma Gamma joined the ranks of larger organizations including the Society for Public Health Education, American Public Health Association, American Association for Health Education, and American School Health Association.

In 2017, the organization declared its inaugural class of Fellows of Eta Sigma Gamma, who were described as "instrumental in the formation and development of the Honorary." The 2017 class of fellows included founding officers and members, instrumental chapter advisors, and officers of the organization. Fellows are entitled and encouraged to use the post-nominal letters "FESG."

== Symbols ==
The Greek letters ΗΣΓ were chosen as the organization's letters to represent "HSC", an abbreviation for health science. The society's pillars are Education, Research, Service, and Advocacy.

The society's insignia is a triangle surrounded by three conjoined circles, with the words "teaching," "research," and "service." Inside the triangle are four smaller triangles featuring an open book symbolizing education, a microscope representing research, an outstretched hand representing service and advocacy, and a lamp of learning that symbolizes the ideals of teaching. A lamp is also used in Eta Sigma Gamma's installation and initiation ceremonies.

Eta Sigma Gamma's colors are dark green and gold. Its flower is the trillium, selectionf or its three green leaves and gold center. Its publications are The Health Educator and The Vision.

== Membership ==
The primary path to membership is through a student membership with a chapter at an associated university. University students are eligible for membership after declaring a major or minor area of study in health education and meeting a minimum GPA requirement. Professional membership is available to individuals who have a degree in health education and apply to join the chapter-at-large.

== Chapters ==
In addition to the national at-large professional chapter, the society has established more than 85 collegiate chapters.

== Notable members ==
- Morgan Pigg, professor emeritus at the University of Florida Department of Health Education and Behavior
