= Global Food for Education Initiative =

Defunct school food program

In the United States, the Global Food for Education Initiative (GFEI) was a pilot project, launched in fiscal year 2000, which used the donation of surplus agricultural commodities under Section 416 of the Agricultural Act of 1949 (P.L. 89-439, as amended) to support a global school feeding program.

The GFEI was superseded by the McGovern-Dole International School Feeding and Child Nutrition Program (IFEP), established by the 2002 Farm Bill. By decision of President George W. Bush, the McGovern-Dole Program was to be administered by the USDA.

== See also ==
- Gleaning
