= School health and nutrition services =

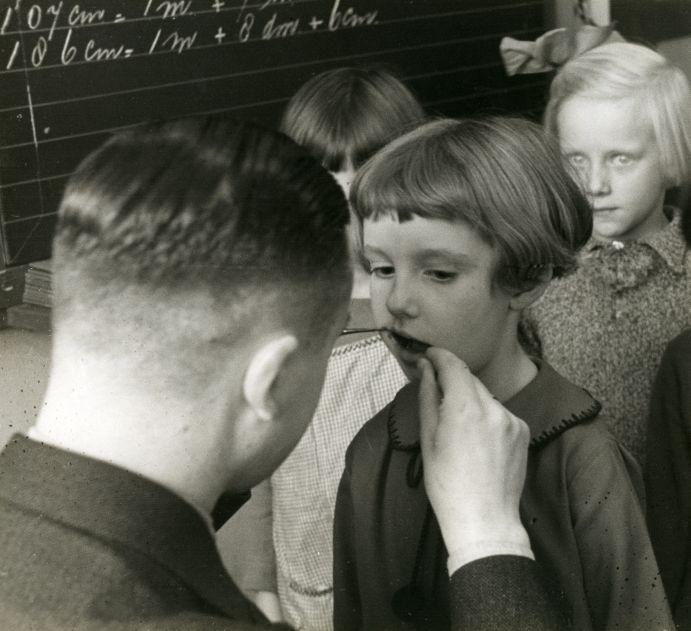
School dentist examining children's teeth in the Netherlands, 1935.

School-based health and nutrition services are provided through the school system to improve the health and well-being of children and in some cases whole families and the broader community. These services have been developed in different ways around the globe, but the fundamentals are similar: the early detection, correction, prevention or amelioration of disease, disability and abuse from which school aged children can suffer.

== Background ==
It was shown by statistics that many pupils were behind in their studies only because of lack of physical vitality. In 1920, it was shown that so many pupils in the schools of Brooklyn, New York, were compelled to pass through the same grades twice that, at the average cost of US$40 a term for each pupil, they cost the borough $2,000,000. On this basis various social organizations demanded an appropriation from the city of $100,000 for more effective medical aid to the school children, contending that more than half of the extra expense could thus be saved. Out of 252,000 school-children inspected in New York City in 1919, 74% were found defective physically, defective teeth and vision being the chief faults.

== History ==
Medical inspection in schools was first instituted in France in 1886, then, in succession, this example was followed by Belgium, Hungary, Chile, Germany and Great Britain, the latter in 1908. In the United States, medical inspection in schools was first instituted in New York City in 1892, then in Boston in 1894, in Chicago in 1895, and in Philadelphia in 1898.

A Catholic Church conciliar statement published in 1965 noted that "look[ing] after the health of the pupils" was an important task for the state in relation to children's education in schools.

UNESCO published a set of tools in 2001 to support the FRESH framework, to guide those wishing to set up school health services around the world. Designed primarily for developing nations, these tools can be of universal use. The main emphasis of these tools is on:

- HIV/AIDS
- Food and nutrition
- Helminths and hygiene
- Malaria
- Violence
- Drugs, tobacco and alcohol

== School health services around the world ==
=== Morocco ===
Indicators of school health in Morocco are troublesome. An article by the European Institute of Health Sciences (Institut Européen des Sciences de la Santé) in Casablanca noted that:

- 15% of school children in Morocco (1.25 million) live with chronic medical conditions such as bronchial asthma, allergies, diabetes mellitus, anemia, epilepsy, congenital diseases and cancer.
- 10% to 25% of injuries to children occur while they are in school.
- 85% of infections occurring in school children are transmitted in school.
- 15% of school children develop an emotional or behavioral problem. One third of them will have serious dysfunction.
- Statistics about engagement of Moroccan youth in risky behaviors are alarming.

School health services are traditionally provided by school nurses, but there is a severe shortage of qualified school nurses. The Institute therefore proposes both a one-year specialization program in school nursing designed for registered general nurses and a one-year program for qualifying teachers in providing school health services.

=== United Kingdom ===
The health of children and youth in the UK is the responsibility of the NHS rather than schools, for example child health screening and advice for parents of overweight children . Free school meals are provided for infants and for children whose families are eligible for many benefits.

The post-war Education Act 1944 made it compulsory for children at primary and secondary schools to have dental inspections leading to the provision of a School Dental Service.

==== Examples of existing services ====
- England - Warrington
- Northern Ireland
- Scotland

=== United States ===
School health services are well developed in the United States. Central guidelines are provided by Making Health Academic but each state, and within that each school board, has adopted its own specific methods.

Making Health Academic is a five-year project funded by CDC's Division of Adolescent and School Health (DASH), designed to enable all US schools to be part of a co-ordinated school health program. The project is built around the fact that six preventable behaviours, mainly learned in childhood and youth, account for most of the serious illnesses and premature deaths in the United States.

==== Examples of existing services ====
- Massachusetts. An example from a maritime state is where a typical mission statement starts "School Health Services fosters the growth, development and educational achievement of Massachusetts' students by promoting their health and wellbeing ... "
- New Mexico. An example from a southern state is where an interesting "yucca model of coordinated school health" is used to help visualize the inter-relationship of the services.

==== Relevant US Wikipedia links ====
- National Assembly on School-Based Health Care
- American School Health Association

=== Other countries ===
School health systems are expanding in low- and middle-income countries. Information on school health in these countries is collated on the Schools and Health website maintained by the Partnership for Child Development. A database of School Health and Nutrition (SHN) Programmes in low and middle income countries can be found on the site:

- SHN Country Programme Database

==== Examples of existing services ====
- Australia
- Canada
- Republic of Ireland
- Nigeria has a non-profit NGO dedicated to improving the health of Nigerian adolescents.
- Singapore
- Pakistan
- India has a non-profit SHARP NGO dedicated to improving the health of Indian school students .
