= FRESH Framework =

Inter-agency framework for school health policies

FRESH is an acronym for Focusing Resources on Effective School Health, an inter-agency framework developed by UNESCO, UNICEF, WHO, and the World Bank, launched at the Dakar Education Forum, 2000, which incorporates the experience and expertise of these and other agencies and organizations. It is a worldwide program for improving the health of school children and youth.

== Core areas ==
Although aimed at improving learning opportunities for children and youths by first improving their health, FRESH is more than simply the provision of school health services. FRESH is a combination of activities in four core areas:

- School health policies
- Water, sanitation and the environment
- Skills based health education
- School-based health and nutrition services

There are three supporting strategies:

- Effective partnerships between the education and health sectors
- Community partnership
- Student participation

== Importance to UNESCO ==
The importance UNESCO attaches to this initiative can be seen from its introduction:

At the dawn of the 21st century, the learning potential of children and young people in every country in the world is compromised by conditions and behaviours that undermine the physical and emotional well-being that makes learning possible. Hunger, malnutrition and micronutrient deficiencies, intestinal infections, infection with HIV and other sexually transmitted infections, malaria, violence, drug and alcohol abuse threaten the health and lives of the children and youth in which Education for All efforts are most invested.

A substantial body of evidence supports approaches in which policy development, health-promoting environmental change, skills-based health education and school-based health services are strategically combined to address priority health problems that interfere with learning for the targeted group. Such approaches extend the vision of health to include emotional/mental and psychosocial wellbeing as well as physical health.

== Online tools ==
Reflecting the main themes of the program, online tools are available freely to all:

- planning and evaluation
- school health policies
- water sanitation and the environment
- school health services
- HIV/AIDS
- food and nutrition
- parasitic worms and hygiene
- malaria
- violence
- drugs, alcohol and tobacco

== Global challenges ==
FRESH is linked to three global challenges:

- Gender
- Education for All (EFA) and Quality Education
- Education for Sustainable Development (ESD)

== See also ==
- Free school meal
- Personal, social, health and economic education
- School dinner
- School Health Education Study
- School health services
