= Elena Sliepcevich =

American health educator (1919–2008)

Elena M. Sliepcevich (July 29, 1919 - March 3, 2008) was one of the leading figures in the development of health education as an academic discipline and profession.

== Biography ==
Elena M. Sliepcevich was born in Anaconda, Montana to Serbian parents, Maksim and Jovanka Sliepcevich, on July 29, 1919. A 1939 graduate of the University of Idaho, Sliepcevich received her master's degree in Health Education from the University of Michigan in 1949 and her doctorate in Physical Education from Springfield College in 1955. She was a professor of health education at the Ohio State University in 1961, when she was selected to direct the School Health Education Study (1961–1969). Most health education curricula developed since have been based on the 10 conceptual areas identified by the School Health Education Study: community health, consumer health, environmental health, family life, mental and emotional health, injury prevention and safety, nutrition, personal health, prevention and control of disease, and drug use and abuse. The Study's model curriculum became known as the School Health Curriculum Project (later renamed Growing Healthy).

When Elena Sliepcevich turned seventeen, she earned an elementary teaching certificate, becoming the youngest person in Montana state to do so.

The Study's findings were also the major reason for President Nixon’s creation of the President's Committee on Health Education in 1971. When the National Center for Health Education (NCHE) was created in 1975 as a result of one of the recommendation of the committee, Dr. Sliepcevich was one of the center's founders. She was one of the principal framers of the NCHE's first major activity, the Health Education Role Delineation Project (1978–1981).

Following the School Health Education Study, she joined the faculty of Southern Illinois University at Carbondale (SIUC), where she was Professor in both the Department of Health Education and the School of Medicine, and team taught courses with David Duncan, Robert Gold, and Elaine Vitello. During her time at SUIC, Sliepcevich won several awards, most notably becoming the first professional to receive the American Association for Health Education Scholar Award in 1977. She continued to teach at SIUC until her retirement in 1993. SIU established the Elena M. Sliepcevich Centre for Health Education Studies to honor her contributions to the school and the field of health education. She died in Norman, Oklahoma on March 3, 2008.
