= School dental service =

Dental screening network in UK

The School Dental Service was a county council network of dental screening for children at school in UK in the mid-20th century. In some areas it is now known as a community dental service.

== Other countries ==
Germany had pioneered early school medical services, with the first eye checks for children in the 1860s by Hermann Cohn in Breslau and the first school doctor at Frankfurt in 1883, later adopted by the UK.

A school dental service opened in Strasbourg in 1902, then part of Germany. At the Royal College of Surgeons of England, in August 1911, was the annual conference of the International Dental Federation, where Professor Jessen, from Strasbourg, the President, said there were 78 school dental clinics in Germany, with 162 dentists, costing £15,000: these treated 1,099,000 children.

The Forsyth Institute opened in 1908 in Boston for children's dentistry. At the International Dental Federation conference in August 1912, at the University of Stockholm, Gustaf V the King, welcomed the delegates; he took a personal interest. There were 120 school dental clinics in Germany, 25 in Sweden and 7 in London, and 20 throughout the rest of the UK. The president of the Federation was William Bromfield Paterson (1861–1924) of the UK.

== History ==
A School Dentists Society had been set up in November 1898 for private school dentists, by Sidney Spokes of University College London.

Sedley Taylor of Cambridge in February 1907, a fellow of Trinity College, Cambridge, gave £500 for the care of the teeth of children attending Cambridge Council schools, at the first school dental clinic, the Cambridge Dental Clinic, operating at 12a Park Side from August 1907, with George Cunningham. In the first year, around 2,500 children were inspected, and around 1,000 children were treated. The scheme was taken over by the Corporation of Cambridge from 1 April 1909. The dental officer was paid £300. The children would be largely of the ages from 5 to 9. It followed work at Dundee in 1885 by William McPherson Fisher (1853–1938), who later helped found Dundee Dental Hospital.

From work by civil servant Sir Robert Morant and the President of the Board of Education, Reginald McKenna, the 1907 Education Act was passed, where Clause 13 introduced medical provision in schools, such as school nurses.

Some other local authorities followed Cambridge. The Education Act 1918 had nominal provision for dental treatment for children at school.

Birmingham appointed a School Dental Surgeon in 1921, paying £400 to £550. This was the going rate, around the same amount for School Medical Officers, who also worked at county-level.

The Dentists Act 1921 had increased the number of dentists across the UK from around 4,000 in 1921 to around 13,000 in 1926, which encouraged local education authorities to employ more school dentists. Under Section 80 of the Education Act 1921 children at elementary schools now required medical inspections.

At the 1927 annual conference of the British Dental Association, Professor of Dental Surgery at the University of Liverpool, William Henry Gilmour, laid the main cause of the dreadful state of children's teeth at chocolate. He held the first professorship of Dentistry in the UK. He claimed that UV light would prevent infections.

By 1928 the school dental service had around 600 dentists, treating around 1m children per year.

In December 1930 the Chief Medical Officer to the Board of Education, Sir George Newman, wrote a report 'The Health of the School Child' stating that 4m children needed dental treatment, but only 58.5% received this, around 2.34m children. For 3.5m children to get dental treatment, it would require around 1,300 dentists. Eventually the school dental service would be looking for 2,100 dentists in total. The service cost £680,000, which would rise to £1.4m, with the greater number of dentists. In 1913 there were two school dentists for 365,000 school children in Wales; by 1931 there were 38.

In the 1934 'Health of the School Child' report, Arthur MacNalty, chief medical officer to the Board of Education, wrote that free school milk was introduced in October 1934. There was also a school ophthalmic service.

At a meeting of the British Dental Association, at the Methodist Central Hall, Westminster, for dentists across the British Empire in 1936, Sir Kingsley Wood said that 314 out of 316 local education authorities had school dental schemes. School dentists had risen from 481 to 604, and children treated from 1.1m to 1.4m, in five years. During the 1930s the dental schools produced 317 dentists per year.

=== Second World War ===
The Central Dental War Committee coordinated the provision of dentists for evacuated children.

On Monday 29 March 1943 at 11.08am, at the school dental clinic, three children and two adults were killed instantly, when a German tip and run attack, by four Focke-Wulf Fw 190 aircraft, hit the building on Sussex Street in Brighton, from Jagdgeschwader 54. The bomb bounced across Circus Street and exploded in the main entrance of the clinic. The aircraft also machine-gunned the streets. Two Spitfire aircraft followed them home, from 610 Sqn at RAF Biggin Hill, with a Belgian Flying Officer shooting one of the German aircraft down, crashing into the sea 100 yards from the shore, at Black Rock. The pilot's body was washed ashore, at Ovingdean, on 25 April 1943. 21 year old Unteroffizier Joachim Koch was buried in Bear Road Cemetery.

By 1944 children's teeth were less defective than found in 1934. This was attributed to the addition of calcium in bread, vitamins in margarine, and school milk.

It was the Education Act 1944 that made it compulsory for children at primary and secondary schools to have dental inspections in England and Wales. The provision of a school dental service mostly appeared after the Second World War, and until the end of the 1980s.

=== Formation of the NHS ===
The service did no change when the NHS was formed, but by 1949 local education authorities were offering unattractive pay rates for dentists.

School dentists had received around £600 to £800 a year. The Journal of the American Dental Association took notice of the situation in the UK, and the preventative effect of the School Dental Service was now being underfunded.

The deterioration of the service was discussed in parliament by Conservative MPs Brendan Bracken on Wednesday 9 February 1950, who said that the formation of the NHS had 'completely ruined' the service, and on Monday 8 May 1950 by Albert Cooper. At the prize-giving of the Royal Dental Hospital, in October 1950, Sir Cecil Wakeley spoke of the 'disintegration' of the school dental service.

By February 1951 there were 734 dentists for 5.25m children, reduced from 921 dentists before the NHS. The service was described as being in 'ruins'. There were 717 dentists by July 1951.

=== Introduction of dental charges ===
NHS dental charges were brought in on 1 June 1952. By November 1952 there were 827 dentists. By April 1954 there were 945 dentists. Introduction of dental charges had brought more dentists into the service.

By July 1956 there were 1231 female dentists in the UK, and many worked in the school dental service. There were 16 dental schools.

In 1969, of 8m children, 4.5m were seen by the school dental service.

=== Dissolution of the service in 1974 ===
The NHS was restructured in 1974, with the Schools Dental Service superseded by Community Dental Services.

School dental services were operating in the early 1980s, but from the 1980s the services were subsumed by NHS community dental services; often this was a reduced service. In 1982, there were on average 6,000 schoolchildren, per district dental officer, in England and Wales.

By the late 1980s, due to advances in toothpaste, and lowering of typical rates of dental treatment amongst children, the provision of having a schools dental service was seen as much less of a priority, than in the 1950s, when advances in toothpaste had not occurred. Some schools had vastly better dental health than others.

In the 1980s three dental schools were closed, as the government predicted that there would be too many dentists; by the late 1990s there began to be a wide shortage of qualified dentists across the UK. Affluent areas, such as Cheshire, had good and improving dental health, but deprived areas, such as Manchester, did not.

== Operation ==
Each county would have an area or district dental officer, who would run the county school dental service. In 1952 there were 827 school dental officers.

In Warwickshire, a dentist would visit a secondary school twice a week, and a child would have two check ups a year, with an individual dental record card.

A county education authority would run the service, later replaced by the regional health authority from 1974, often known as the Community Dental Service.

== See also ==
- School health and nutrition services
- School Nursing Service
