= Kittleson House =

- U.S. National Register of Historic Places
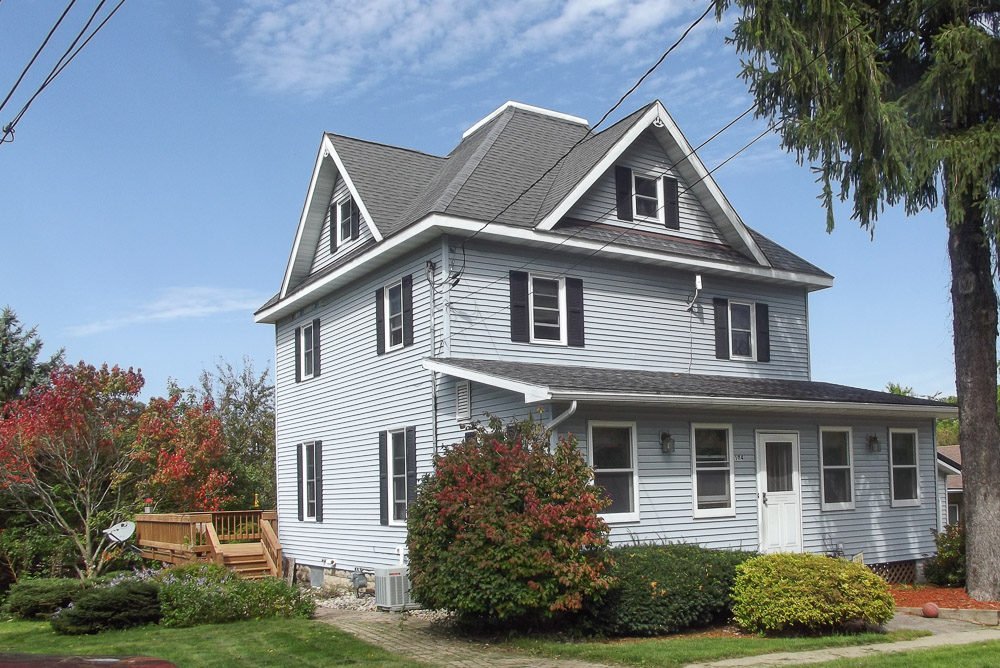
- Kittleson House in 2019
- Location: Barneveld, Wisconsin
- Built: 1911
- Architect: Unknown
- Architectural style: American Foursquare
- NRHP reference No.: 86002304
- Added to NRHP: September 29, 1986

The Kittleson House is located in Barneveld in Iowa County, Wisconsin. It was added to the National Register of Historic Places in 1986.

== History ==
The building has been used as a domestic residence since built. It was recognized by the National Park Service with a listing on the National Register of Historic Places on September 29, 1986. The property is also listed in the State Historical Register since January 1, 1989

== Architecture ==
From the NRHP designation: "The white clapboard Kittleson House is an American Foursquare, defined by its two-story cubical form and hipped roof. Each plane of the roof has a gabled dormer with a small square window to light the attic. An element of Queen Anne influence is seen in the decorative shingle work used in each dormer. A broad hip roofed porch supported by four round posts extends across the entire front facade. Beneath the porch, a shallow bay window is located to the right of the central door. A one-story enclosed porch protects the back entrance." The house was the product of an unknown architect.
