= School feeding in low-income countries =

Social safety net

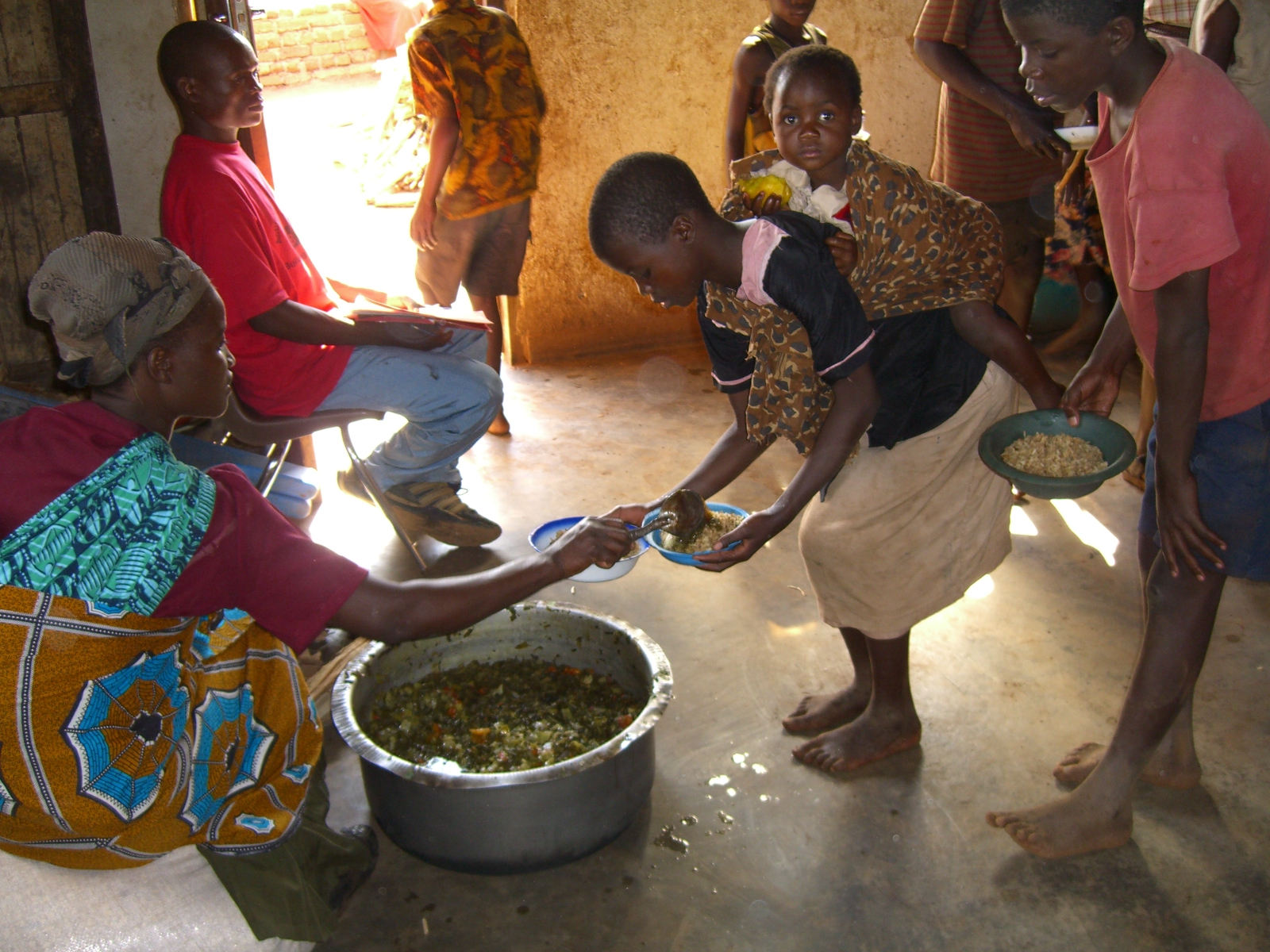
School feeding program in Malawi

The World Bank defines school feeding programs as "targeted social safety nets that provide both educational and health benefits to the most vulnerable children, thereby increasing enrollment rates, reducing absenteeism, and improving food security at the household level." In addition to enhancing access to food, these programs positively affect nutritional status, gender equity, and educational outcomes. This can contribute to the a country's overall advancement and human development.

While school meals are provided by governments of most high- and middle-income governments around the globe, the children who may benefit the most from school feeding programs often live in low-income countries that lack government-supported school meals. School feeding in low-income countries is typically initiated through funding from international organizations such as the United Nations World Food Programme, the World Bank, or national governments through programs such as the McGovern-Dole International Food for Education and Child Nutrition Program. However, some governments first establish their own school-feeding programs and later request assistance from these organizations. Many countries have also "graduated" from their dependence on foreign assistance by restructuring their programs to be country-led and self-supported.

Globally, as of 2024, 84% of countries have school meal programmes, double the number of countries that did so 25 years ago. But less than a third of primary school students receive free or subsidized meals. Coverage is 27% in low-, 18% in lower-middle-, 39% in upper-middle- and 45% in high-income countries. Although school feeding programs are widespread, they vary considerably in design, implementation, and evaluation. Consequently, literature reviews and studies frequently focus on only a few countries, since comparing programs across different contexts can be challenging.

== Need for school feeding programs ==
According to the United Nations World Food Programme, 66 million primary school-age children go hungry daily, including 23 million in Africa alone. Furthermore, 80% of these 66 million children live in just 20 countries. The need to reduce hunger while increasing school enrollment is therefore evident. School feeding programs have been developed to address this multifaceted challenge.

Strong nutrition has links to stronger education outcomes. A review of 38 studies in 25 countries found a 3% increase in enrolment and a 14% increase in mathematics scores linked to school meal programmes, although effects on attendance and reading were limited. Feeding programmes have also been found to increase educational attainment by up to half a year per USD 100 invested. An analysis in 14 countries, of which 9 in Africa, estimated that an annual investment of USD 11 billion in school feeding generated USD 156 billion in social benefits through improved lifetime productivity and health.

Schools serve as primary locations for implementing health and education interventions. School feeding is one component of broader school health initiatives, which also include deworming, HIV/AIDS prevention and education, and life and health skills education. Overall, school feeding programs have been shown to directly improve the educational and nutritional status of participating children and indirectly impact the economic and social well-being of them and their families. Additionally, school feeding directly supports the Millennium Development Goals (MDGs) of reducing hunger by half, achieving universal primary education, and achieving gender parity in education by 2015.

== Types of school feeding programs ==
There are two main approaches to food distribution within school feeding programs: on-site meals and take-home rations. On-site meals are served to children during the school day, such as morning porridge or nutrient-fortified biscuits. Take-home rations consist of basic food items, such as rice or cooking oil, given to families whose children regularly attend school.

Although food items for school feeding programs can be imported into the country from anywhere in the world, many countries and organizations are expanding "home-grown school feeding," which requires that food be produced and procured domestically to the greatest extent possible. These programs provide improved nutrition and educational opportunities for children while benefitting smallholder farmers by offering access to a stable and predictable market. The New Partnership for Africa's Development (NEPAD) encouraged governments in Sub-Saharan Africa to adopt home-grown school feeding as a key intervention under the Comprehensive Africa Agriculture Development Programme (CAADP). Countries such as Côte d'Ivoire, Ghana, Kenya, Mali, and Nigeria currently participate in home-grown school feeding programs.

== Approaches to school feeding ==
=== Country involvement in school feeding programs ===
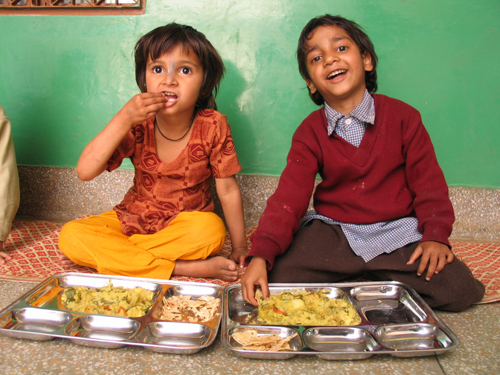
School feeding program in India

According to the International Food Policy Research Institute, school feeding systems progress through five stages. The first stage includes programs largely dependent on external funding and implementation, while the fifth stage includes programs primarily funded and implemented by national governments. Afghanistan and Sudan, for example, fall into the first stage, as their governments are unable to independently operate school feeding programs. In contrast, countries such as Chile and India are in the fifth stage and operate long-standing, country-led school feeding programs. Chile has provided school meals for more than 40 years through the Junta Nacional de Auxilio Escolar y Becas (National Board of School Aid and Scholarships), which uses centralized food production and distribution. India has supported school feeding since 2001, when the constitutional right to food was recognized. Countries in the intermediate stages, such as Kenya and Ecuador, possess some but not all of the necessary policies, financial resources, or institutional capacities to operate school feeding programs without external support.

These programmes have been linked to improve access and equity in education. Rwanda scaled up its national school feeding programme in 2020/21 and 93% of primary school students were benefiting by 2022/23. Critically, the government covered 93% of the cost with its own funds, having tripled its contribution, while a directive in September 2022 capped parents’ contributions to reduce disparities and support vulnerable families. In Cambodia, feeding programmes including breakfast and a take-home ration for poor families with girls in grades 4 to 6 increased enrolment by 6% and 5% respectively and improved completion. In India, a 2001 directive ordered states to introduce midday meals in government primary schools, which were associated with a 13% increase in enrolment three years later. In Ghana, an evaluation in food-insecure districts found that school feeding improved attendance, especially for girls and disadvantaged children. In Mozambique a longitudinal assessment found that school meals had the strongest association with dropout reduction among the factors examined, including distance to school and textbook availability. Nevertheless, in 2025, its national programme still only reached fewer than one in 10 primary students. In Bolivia, progress in lower secondary completion formed part of a multisectoral approach combining school meals and cash transfers to lower economic and social barriers. Its National School Feeding Programme reached 87% of public schools by 2012. In China, a Nutrition Improvement Programme introduced in 2011 in deprived rural areas reached 42% of students by 2021, and increased enrolment by 10 percentage points.

=== Involvement of the World Food Programme ===
The United Nations World Food Programme (WFP) is the world's leading provider of school feeding resources, supporting approximately 22 million schoolchildren, about half of whom are girls, across 70 countries. The total financial contribution for these programs is nearly US$500 million per year. In many cases, WFP works alongside governments, but in countries with corrupt or non-functional governments, it may operate independently or in partnership with non-governmental organizations (NGOs). WFP estimates that US$3.2 billion is needed each year to feed the world's 66 million hungry school-age children, approximately US$50 per child.

WFP has been working with governments around the world for more than 45 years but is transitioning from a food-aid organization to a food-assistance organization, working to move away from "individual, isolated projects to more strategic and comprehensive approaches". To foster government ownership of school feeding, WFP has established eight quality standards for designing and implementing sustainable programs:

- A strategy for sustainability,
- A national policy framework
- Stable funding and budgeting
- Needs-based, cost-effective quality programme design
- Strong institutional arrangements for implementation, monitoring, and accountability
- Strategy for local production and sourcing
- Strong partnerships
- Inter-sector coordination, and community participation and ownership.

== Benefits of school feeding ==
=== Nutrition and food security ===
School meals have been shown to increase children's nutritional status by diversifying diets and improving micronutrient absorption. By providing food that many children would otherwise lack, school feeding increases total caloric intake and reduces household food demand, thereby improving family food security. Take-home rations can raise the nutritional status of entire households, not just school-age children. However, criticisms of school meals' nutritional impact stem from the belief that the benefits they provide are only temporary. Critics argue that school meals do not address the underlying causes of malnutrition, such as high food prices and inadequate food distribution systems that threaten food security.

=== Education ===
Education is a key component of school feeding programs and global development, as more educated people generally enjoy greater opportunities, higher earnings, and improved quality of life. School meals increase enrollment and attendance, reduce dropout rates, and improve cognitive performance and learning outcomes. Providing meals offsets both the financial and opportunity costs of schooling, encouraging families to send their children to school. Additionally, the promise of food can motivate children to attend school.

=== Gender equity ===
School feeding programs can increase gender equity in education, which supports broader social and economic equality. Girls' education is affected by gender-stereotyped curricula, safety concerns, cultural norms that undervalue girls' schooling, and inadequate school infrastructure. Due to the combination of such barriers, girls are disproportionately affected by the direct and opportunity cost of schooling, which prevents girls from very poor households from attending school. Opportunity costs for girls' education include lost time that would otherwise be spent doing household chores and care work. School feeding programs reduce the costs of sending girls to school, resulting in higher enrollment. Furthermore, increased female literacy is linked to lower fertility rates, greater economic opportunity, and other markers of female empowerment.

== Drawbacks and challenges to school feeding ==
While school feeding programs have a variety of positive impacts, they can also produce some unintended negative effects. For example, these programs can increase the cost of schooling by requiring communities provide firewood for cooking as well as other items such as fresh fruit, vegetables, and condiments. Additionally, school cooks are less likely to be remunerated in lower-income settings. Communities are often expected to provide volunteers to cook these meals and maintain stores of all required food products, as well as kitchens and other essentials of meal provision. As these needs and requirements increase, the net benefit of school feeding programs to a community may be reduced.

School feeding programs are highly context-specific, and each community's program must be designed based on demographics, geography, and other local conditions. For this reason, a variety of challenges can emerge in the creation and implementation of school feeding programs. A successful program requires that countries:

- Determine whether school feeding is the most effective way to target needy children
- Define program goals and outcomes
- Select the type of food to serve
- Determine a food procurement method
- Plan for management, implementation, and monitoring within schools, along with a variety of other concerns

Because school feeding programs vary by community and require a great deal of planning, sustainability is a main point of concern for many countries. Governments are often limited by the demands placed on staff, resources, and infrastructure, and many have to rely on external financial and personnel support to continue programs over the long term.

== Impacts of school feeding programs in low-income countries ==
Although school feeding produces a variety of expected outcomes, ongoing research seeks to better evaluate its effects in low-income settings. School feeding program results are often context-specific, but shared lessons from a variety of communities can inform broader assessments. Researchers at the International Food Policy Research Institute have critically assessed evidence from developing countries to define preliminary results of these programs. These assessments found that the timing of meals is not critical to improving learning and cognition, and thus take-home rations can perform as well as in-school meals, and that in-school meals may even disrupt learning. In some settings, take-home rations are more cost-effective than in-school meals, and the study argued that some country programs may be optimized by focusing resources on take-home rations. Additionally, it was found that in the study setting, school attendance improved learning more significantly than nutrition status improvements, but that school feeding programs encouraged attendance and still had a positive net result on education levels. A study by Patrick J. McEwan found no evidence that higher-calorie meals improve school enrollment or attendance. It also reported no positive effects on first-grade enrollment age, grade repetition, or fourth-grade test scores compared with average-calorie meals in Chile's national program. Thus, McEwan's study suggested that Chilean policy, to produce significant positive results, should focus more on the nutritional composition of school meals rather than caloric content alone.

== See also ==
- Food security
- Malnutrition
- Sex differences in education
