= School Health Education Study =

The School Health Education Study (SHES) was a crucial event in transforming health education as practiced in American public schools. It has been called, "the most significant school health education initiative of the 1960s" and was largely responsible for establishing the value of comprehensive health education rather than separate disease-specific units and in introducing the concept-based approach to education in general. Most health curricula developed since have followed the model set by the SHES in its School Health Curriculum Project.

== Origins ==
In 1960 millionaire distiller and philanthropist Samuel Bronfman asked Dr. Granville Larimore, then Deputy Commissioner of the New York State Department of Health and a member of the Joint Committee on Health Problems in Education of the American Medical Association (AMA) and the National Education Association (NEA), to suggest several projects in health or education that should receive funding but were being neglected by governmental and private funders. Dr. Larimore suggested three priorities: (I) graduate medical education, (2) effectiveness of the mass media for health education, and (3) school health education. After hearing presentations on each of these three priorities, the Samuel Bronfman Foundation’s board decided to provide $200,000 for a study of the status of health education in the nation’s schools.

== Initial study ==
The Study was envisioned as an independent, two-year-long investigation, affiliated with the American Association for Health, Physical Education and Recreation (AAHPER) and the National Education Association. Bronfman sought the advice of Delbert Oberteuffer, professor at the Ohio State University and widely regarded as the leading figure in health education at that time, regarding who could best lead the study. Oberteuffer recommended one of his young OSU colleagues, Elena Sliepcevich. Dr. Sliepcevich accepted the appointment and moved to Washington, DC where the SHES leased office space on Dupont Circle in the building next door to the NEA.

During its first year, the Study assessed the state of health education offerings in a total of 135 school systems covering 38 states and involving some 1101 individual elementary schools and 359 secondary schools. This survey remains the broadest of its type ever completed in the United States. In the second year test instruments were administered to students in grades 6, 9, and 12 of the participating schools. Of 17,634 usable answer sheets re¬turned to the researchers, a weighted sample of 2000 scores for each of the three grade levels representative of the makeup of the school sample was selected for analysis. Analysis of the results required a third year of Bronfman Foundation support and led to the conclusion that the state of health education in the nation’s public schools was "appalling".

== School Health Curriculum Project ==
The [3M] Corporation funded SHES for a further six years (1963–1969) to develop a model curriculum—the School Health Curriculum Project or SHCP. Ann E. Nolte, of Ohio State University, joined SHES as associate director of the study and a curriculum writing team was assembled, consisting of: William H. Creswell Jr., professor of health education at the University of Illinois; Gus T. Dalis, of the Los Angeles County Schools; Edward B. Johns, professor of school health education at the University of California, Los Angeles; Marion B. Pollock, assistant professor of health education at California State College, Long Beach; Richard K. Means, professor of health education at Auburn University; and Robert D. Russell, associate professor of health education at Southern Illinois University.

Prof. Russell proposed as the initial point of view for the SHCP that health was a unified concept of well-being. This was expressed in the curriculum as follows, "Health is a quality of life involving dynamic interaction and interdependence among the individual's physical well-being, his (or her) mental and emotional reactions, and the social complex in which he (or she) exists". From this starting point, the SHCP writers identified ten key concepts. Sub concepts were then developed in the physical, mental, and social dimen¬sions for each of the ten concepts. The 31 sub concepts were each linked to behavioral objectives written at four progressive levels—grades K-3, 4–6, 7–9, and 10-12—in the cognitive, affective, and behavioral domains.

== Concepts ==
The ten concepts developed by the SHES as the basis for the SHCP were:

1. Growth and development influences and is influenced by the structure and functioning of the individual.
2. Growing and developing follows a predictable sequence, yet is unique for each individual.
3. Protection and promotion of health is an individual, community, and international responsibility.
4. The potential for hazards and accidents exists, whatever the environment.
5. There are reciprocal relationships involving man (humanity), disease, and environment.
6. The family serves to perpetuate man (humanity) and to fulfill certain health needs.
7. Personal health practices are affected by a complexity of forces, often conflicting.
8. Utilization of health information, products, and services is guided by values and perceptions.
9. Use of substances that modify mood and behavior arises from a variety of motivations.
10. Food selection and eating patterns are determined by physical, social, mental, economic, and cultural factors.
