= David F. Duncan =

American consultant (born 1947)

- Born: June 26, 1947 (age 79); Kansas City, Missouri, U.S.
- Education: Brown University; Sam Houston State University; University of Missouri–Kansas City; UTHealth School of Public Health
- Scientific career
- Workplaces: Brown University

David F. Duncan (born June 26, 1947) is president of Duncan & Associates, a firm providing consultation on research design and data collection for behavioral and policy studies. He is also Clinical Associate Professor in the Department of Community Health at Brown University School of Medicine.

== Education ==
He graduated with a B.A. in psychology from the University of Missouri–Kansas City, and completed graduate work in criminology at Sam Houston State University. He earned the degree of Doctor of Public Health from the University of Texas Health Science Center at Houston with an interdisciplinary concentration in behavioral sciences, epidemiology, biostatistics, and program and policy evaluation. He later earned a postdoctoral diploma in alcoholism early intervention and treatment effectiveness research from Brown University.

== Work ==
Duncan is best known for his contributions in the field of drug abuse, which have often been highly controversial. In 1974, he and Edward Khantzian of Harvard Medical School, in separate publications, proposed what has come to be known as the self-medication hypothesis of addiction. Both authors proposed that addiction arose out of the use of drugs to medicate a preexisting disorder or problem. Duncan's version of the hypothesis is distinguished by its identification of addiction with negative reinforcement. Duncan argued that all of the characteristics commonly cited as typical of addiction, such as persistence in the face of negative consequences and high probability of relapse, are all common in any negatively reinforced behaviors.

He also has argued that harm reduction approaches to addictions, HIV or other public health concerns are instances of the traditional public health practice of tertiary prevention—prevention of deaths or disability that might otherwise occur due to a health problem. Duncan first applied this approach in his work with adolescent drug abusers in Houston, Texas in the early 1970s and soon afterward with heroin addicts. In 1983 he and Robert S. Gold published an argument for this approach, which they then called "cultivating drug use", using the word cultivating in its sense of the elimination of weeds and promotion of healthy growth.

Duncan has also been involved in the development of computer assisted learning and particularly computer based health education. His leadership in this field began at the State University of New York at Brockport, where he collaborated with Robert S. Gold in developing the first course on computers in health education offered at any college. In 1980, he and Gold published two papers that spurred interest in the use of computers in health education. One of these papers was the first publication to suggest that microprocessors, as personal computers were then known, could be preferable to mainframe terminals for use in computer assisted learning. A few years later, Duncan and Gold, then at Southern Illinois University, taught the nation's first college-level course on PC-based methods in education. Three years later, Duncan argued for the value of portable computers, which were just being introduced, for educational and data collection applications. He also pioneered the use of roleplaying games on the PC and internet for use in both health education and data collection.

== Career ==
Duncan was a consultant to President Clinton's White House Office of National Drug Control Policy during his tenure as Senior Study Director of the Substance Abuse Research Group of the Westat corporation. In his position at Westat he also provided consultation to the National Institute on Drug Abuse, Center for Substance Abuse Treatment, Center for Substance Abuse Prevention, National Academy of Science, United States Immigration and Naturalization Service, New York City Housing Authority, and SPSS Inc. He served from 1996 to 1998 as Senior Public Health Epidemiologist in the Director's Office of the Rhode Island Department of Health where he was coordinator of health policy and Project Director of the state's Unified Needs Assessment Program for Substance Abuse Prevention and Treatment.

His varied career has included positions in both juvenile and adult corrections, as a deputy sheriff, and as a private detective. He has directed a halfway house for drug abusers, a comprehensive drug abuse treatment center, and a private school for emotionally disturbed children. He served as a research associate to the working group on substance abuse treatment for the President's Task Force on National Health Care Reform chaired by First Lady Hillary Clinton in 1993. He has held academic appointments as associate professor of Health Science at the State University of New York at Brockport, Professor of Health Education at Southern Illinois University, Professor of Biology at the Community College of Rhode Island, Professor of Health and Environmental Research at the University of Cologne in Germany, and associate professor of Medical Science (Community Health) at Brown University. He has been a visiting lecturer at the University of Rochester, New York State School of Psychiatry, Columbia University's Teachers College and School of Public Health, New England Gerontology Academy, Trinity College (Dublin), Oxford University, German Academy of Public Health, University of Würzburg, and Universidad Complutense de Madrid.

He is chair of the Council on Illicit Drugs and a member of the board of directors of the National Association for Public Health Policy. He chairs the Advisory Committee for the M.P.H. Program at Fort Valley State University. He is a member of the corporation (governing body) of Butler Hospital, a psychiatric hospital in Providence, Rhode Island, and of the Board of Directors of the Bowling Green-Warren County Primary Care Center in Bowling Green, Kentucky. He was Vice Chairman of the Board of Directors of the New England Gerontology Academy. He is a past chairman of the Mental Health Section of the American Public Health Association, and has served on A.P.H.A.'s Governing Council and committees on Program, Membership, and Continuing Education.

== Personal life ==
David F. Duncan, using the pen-name Harold Celline, was convicted of importing child pornography. In 1989 he appealed the conviction for "knowingly receiving visual depictions of minors engaging in sexually explicit conduct, transported and shipped in interstate and foreign commerce, in violation of 18 U.S.C Sec. 2252(a)(2)." The conviction was affirmed. He went to prison.

== Books ==
- Duncan, D. F., and Gold, R. S. (1982). Drugs and the Whole Person. New York: John Wiley and Sons.
- Duncan, D. F., and Gold, R. S. (1985). Drugs and the Whole Person (2nd Ed). New York: MacMillan.
- Duncan, D. F. (1988). Epidemiology: Basis for Disease Prevention and Health Promotion. New York: MacMillan.
- CSAT Consensus Panel (2000). Substance Abuse Treatment for Persons with Child Abuse and Neglect Issues. (CSAT Treatment Improvement Protocol # 36) Rockville, MD: Center for Substance Abuse Treatrment.
- Hornik, R.; Judkins, D.; Golub, A.; Johnson, B.; and Duncan, D. F. (2000). Evaluation of the National Youth Anti-Drug Media Campaign: Historical Trends in Drug Use and Design of the Phase III Evaluation. Washington, DC: White House Office of National Drug Control Policy.
