= Robert S. Gold =

American public health researcher

Robert S. Gold (born 1946) is a public health researcher with focus on the applications of computer technology to health education and health promotion. He was the founding dean of the University of Maryland School of Public Health and is the current chair of the Department of Epidemiology and Biostatistics.

== Education ==
Gold earned an Associate of Science degree from Orange County Community College in 1967, a Bachelor of Science degree in biology from the State University of New York at Brockport in 1969, and a Master of Science degree in health education in 1971. Gold earned a PhD in health education from the University of Oregon in 1976 and a Doctorate of Public Health with a specialization in community health practice from the University of Texas School of Public Health at Houston in 1980.

== Academic career ==
Gold was an instructor in SUNY Brockport's Department of Health Science from 1970–1974 before earning a PhD at the University of Oregon. He returned to SUNY Brockport as an assistant professor from 1976–1978. While working on a second doctorate at the University of Texas School of Public Health, he served as an evaluator for the Texas Department of Mental Health and Mental Retardation. Later, he joined the faculty of Southern Illinois University at Carbondale (SIUC) in 1980 as an associate professor of health education.

Gold took a leave of absence from SIUC in 1984 to serve as director of the School Health Initiative of the US Department of Health and Human Services. In 1986, he joined the faculty of the University of Maryland, College Park (UMD) as Professor of Health Education. From 1988 through 1989, he served at the World Health Organization (WHO) in Geneva, where he was invited to help re-establish the WHO's Division of Health Education and Promotion. In 1990, he began dividing his time between the University of Maryland and Macro International, becoming the vice president and director of public health research at the latter in 1994.

In 1999, Gold returned to a full-time faculty position at UMD and became chair of its Department of Public and Community Health. In July 2002, he was dean of the College of Health and Human Performance. In 2005, he proposed creating the University of Maryland School of Public Health, which launched in September 2007. Gold served as the founding dean of the School of Public Health (SPH) until 2012, when he stepped down. In March 2013, Gold became the chair of the Department of Epidemiology and Biostatistics within the UMD SPH. He served as the founding director of the Public Health Informatics Research Laboratory at UMD and professor of public health at the school.

Gold works in the application of advanced technologies to public health, ranging from interactive video, simulation, and games for health to knowledge management, decision support, and expert systems technology. Gold has published research and evaluation articles as well as software for organizations such as the American Cancer Society and the Department of Health and Human Services.

== Selected honors ==
- President's Medal, University of Maryland, College Park, October 2012
- Honorary Doctor of Sciences, State University of New York, June 2012
- John P. McGovern Medal for Distinguished Contributions to Health Education, American School Health Association, Honolulu, HI, July 2007
- Elected Fellow, American School Health Association, October 2006
- Health Education Hall of Fame, November 2002
- Researcher of the Year Award, American School Health Association, October 1989
