= American School Health Association =

Professional association

- Abbreviation: ASHA
- Formation: 1927
- Founder: 325 physicians
- Founded at: Cincinnati, Ohio
- Type: Professional association
- Purpose: To protect and promote the health of children and youth by supporting coordinated school health programs as a foundation for school success
- Members: 2000
- Website: Official website
- Formerly called: American Association of School Physicians

The American School Health Association (ASHA) is a professional association. It claims a membership of 1,000 members in all 50 US states and other nations. More than half practice in K-12 schools or administer health education or health services programs in school districts or state departments of education.

Founded in 1927 as the American Association of School Physicians by 325 physicians attending the annual meeting of the American Public Health Association in Cincinnati, Ohio, its mission was to protect and promote the health of children and youth by supporting coordinated school health programs as a foundation for school success. In 1936, the organization opened its membership to all professionals interested in promoting school health and adopted its current name.

ASHA publishes the Journal of School Health - a peer-reviewed, indexed professional journal.The current president is Dave Kobel.

== See also ==
- School health services
