= 1936 South Dakota gubernatorial election =

- November 3, 1936
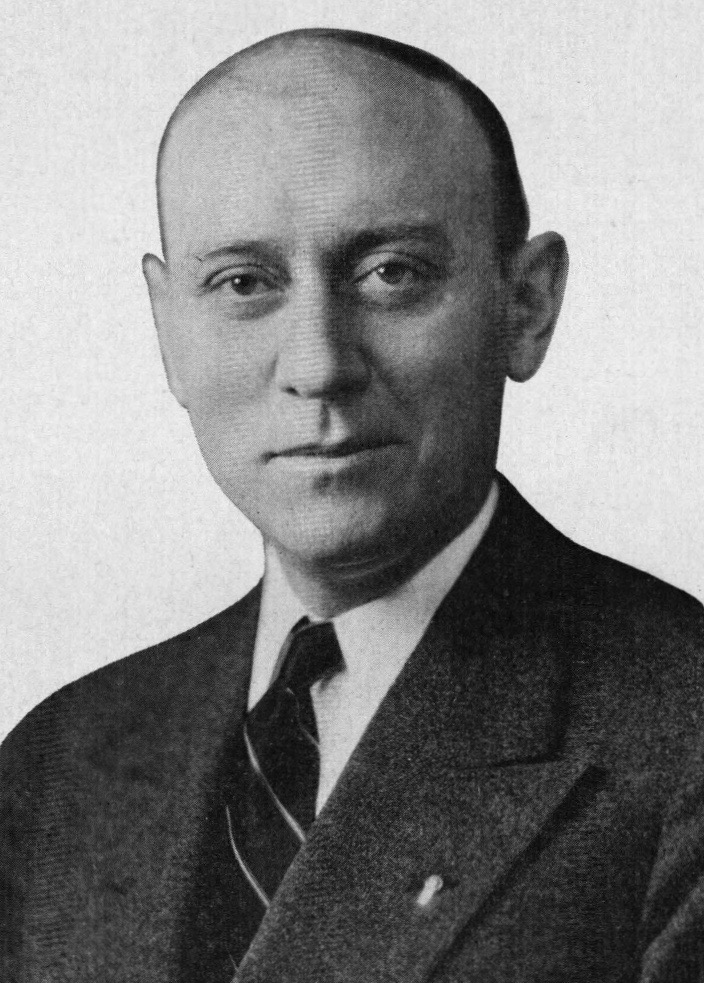

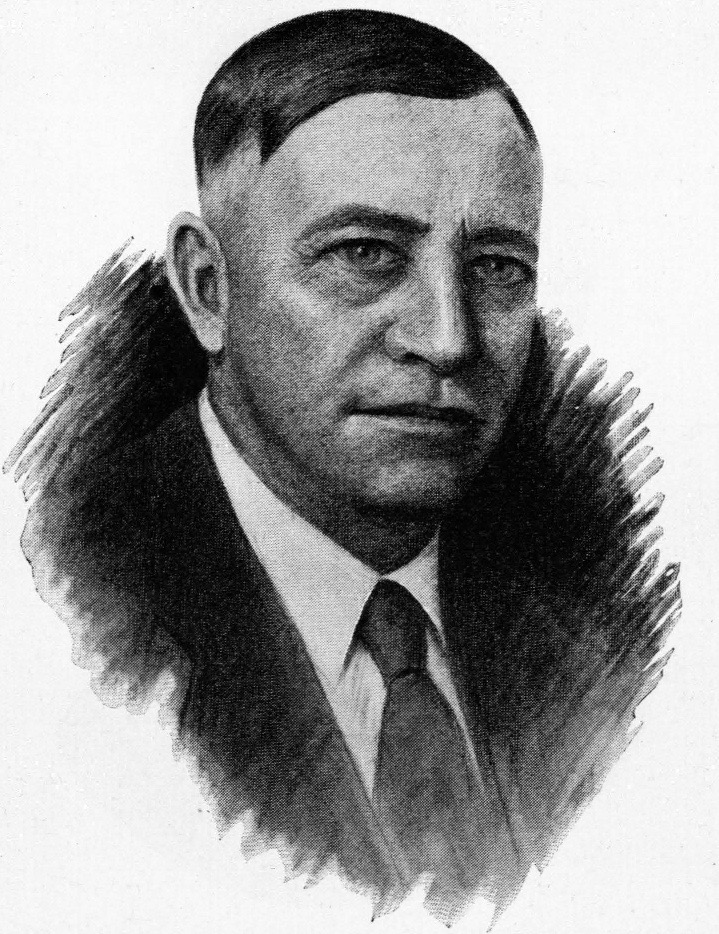
Nominee	Leslie Jensen	Tom Berry
Party	Republican	Democratic
Popular vote	151,659	142,255
Percentage	51.60%	48.40%
- County results Jensen: 50–60% 60–70% 70–80% Berry: 50–60% 60–70%
Governor of South Dakota before election
Tom Berry
Democratic
Elected Governor of South Dakota
Leslie Jensen
Republican

The 1936 South Dakota gubernatorial election was held on November 3, 1936. Incumbent Democratic Governor Tom Berry ran for re-election to a third term, the first Governor of South Dakota to do so. Berry was challenged by Republican Leslie Jensen, the former Collector of Internal Revenue for the state of South Dakota. Both Berry and Jensen won their primaries uncontested and advanced to the general election. Some drama surrounded the potential candidacy of Democratic State Auditor George O'Neill as an independent candidate for Governor or, in the alternative, his cross-party endorsement of Jensen; after initially announcing his campaign and hedging, O'Neill dropped out of the race in September and endorsed the Democratic ticket in the state, including Berry.

The primary issue during the campaign was the drought caused by regional dust storms as part of the Dust Bowl. Republicans attacked Governor Berry's administration for providing inadequate relief to South Dakotan farmers. But Berry's willingness to break the state's unwritten political tradition by seeking a third term was apparently controversial. In the closing days of the campaign, Herbert E. Hitchcock, the Chairman of the South Dakota Democratic Party, emphasized how unwilling Berry had been to seek a third term: "Tom Berry was forced into running for a third term by Democrats and Republicans alike. I, among others, insisted that he lay aside his personal wishes and become a candidate because I felt and thoughts of others felt he owed it to the state of South Dakota to do so."

However, despite Berry's wide victories in 1932 and 1934, he narrowly lost re-election to Jensen. However, President Franklin Roosevelt carried the state by a wide margin, and Democratic Senator William J. Bulow narrowly won re-election.

== General election ==
=== Results ===
1936 South Dakota gubernatorial election
Party	Candidate	Votes	%	±%
Republican	Leslie Jensen	151,659	51.60%	+10.95%
Democratic	Tom Berry (inc.)	142,255	48.40%	−10.20%
Majority		9,404	3.20%	−14.75%
Turnout		293,895	100.00%	
Republican gain from Democratic				
