= 1936 South Dakota Senate election =

- November 3, 1936

45 seats in the South Dakota Senate 23 seats needed for a majority
	Majority party	Minority party
Leader	—	Mancel Peterson
Party	Republican	Democratic
Leader since		1935
Leader's seat		34th (Day Co.)
Last election	13	32
Seats won	23	22
Seat change	▲10	▼10
- Results by winning party Republican hold Republican gain Democratic hold Democratic gain Multi-member districts: Republican majority Democratic majority
President pro tempore before election
Mancel Peterson
Democratic
Elected President pro tempore
L. M. Simons
Republican

Elections to the South Dakota Senate were held on November 3, 1936, to elect 45 candidates to the Senate to serve a two-year term in the 25th South Dakota Legislature. Republicans won twenty-three seats, a gain from the thirteen they won at the 1934 general election, narrowly taking control over the chamber. Republican Senator L. M. Simons of Belle Fourche was elected President pro tempore of the Senate.

Since the 1934 general election, Shannon County (now Oglala Lakota) was folded into District 42, joining with Custer and Fall River counties.

This election took place alongside races for U.S. presidential electors, U.S. Senate, U.S. House, governor, state house, and numerous other state and local elections.

== See also ==
- List of South Dakota state legislatures
