= Charles A. Christopherson =

American lawyer and politician

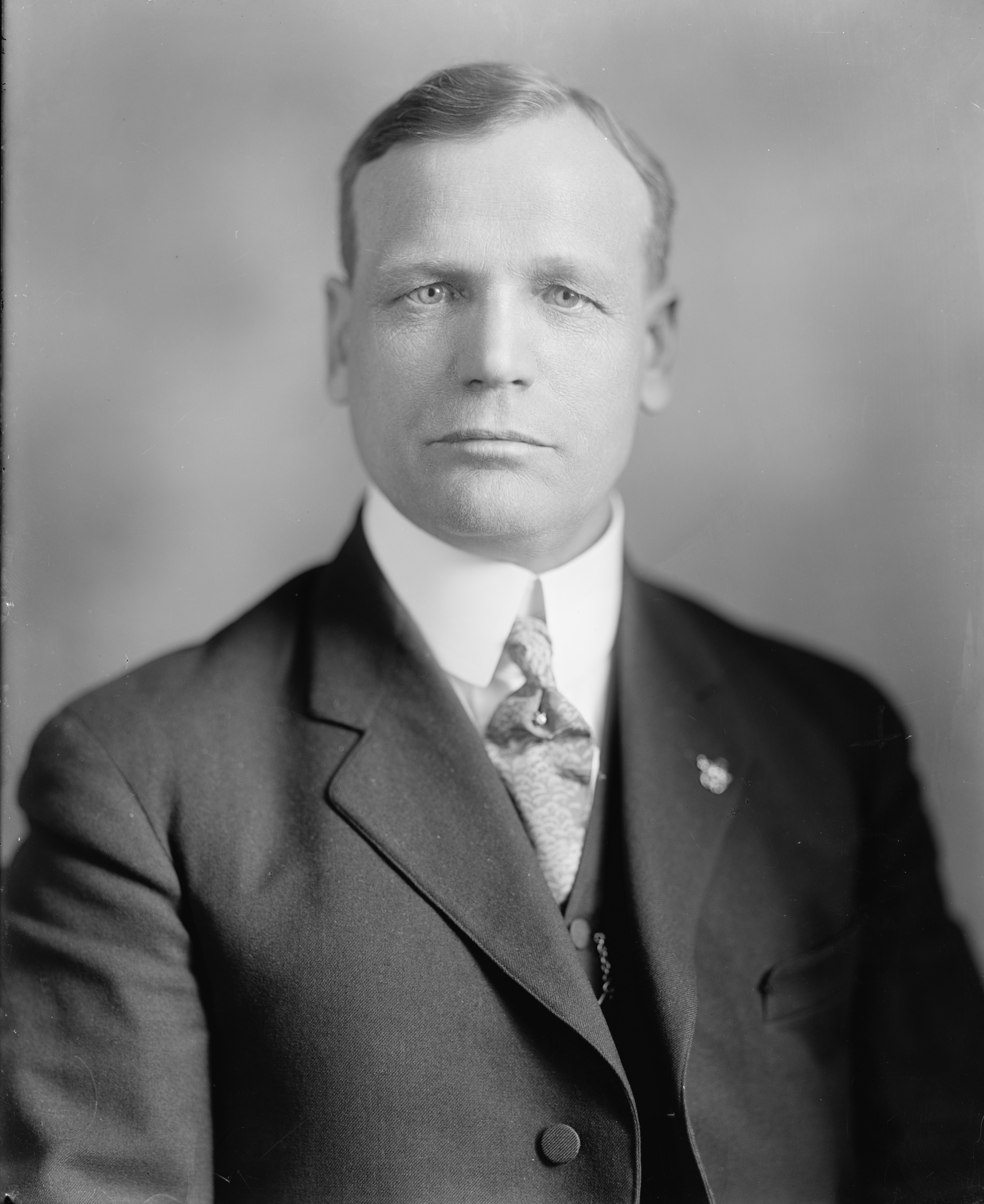

Member of the U.S. House of Representatives from South Dakota's 1st district
- In office March 4, 1919 – March 3, 1933
- Preceded by: Charles H. Dillon
- Succeeded by: Fred H. Hildebrandt

Personal details
- Born: Charles Andrew Christopherson; July 23, 1871 Amherst Township, Fillmore County, Minnesota, U.S.
- Died: November 2, 1951 (aged 80) Sioux Falls, South Dakota, U.S.
- Party: Republican
- Spouse: Abbie Deyoe
- Education: Read Law
- Occupation: Attorney

Charles Andrew Christopherson (July 23, 1871 – November 2, 1951) was an American lawyer and politician in South Dakota. He was elected to the state legislature in 1912. In 1918 he was elected to the United States House of Representatives, where he served a total of seven terms until being defeated in 1932, during the Great Depression.

== Early life and education ==
Christopherson was born in Amherst Township, Fillmore County, Minnesota, to Norwegian parents, Julia (Nelson) and Knute C. Christopherson. His father came to the United States at age fourteen. He was one of seven children and was raised in the Lutheran Church. He attended public schools. Christopherson moved to Sioux Falls, South Dakota, where he attended Sioux Falls Business College and Normal School. He graduated in 1890 and read the law with an established firm until he qualified for the bar.

== Career ==
Christopherson was admitted to the bar in 1893, and started his practice in Sioux Falls at the Joe Kirby law office He later practiced alone until taking Fredolph H. Melquist as a partner in 1913. Christopherson became active in local issues. He was elected as a member of the Board of Education of Sioux Falls from 1908 to 1918, and President of it from 1911 to 1915 and served as president of the board of directors of the Union Savings Association (1912).

== Political career ==
In 1912, he was elected as a Republican to the South Dakota House of Representatives, and served as Speaker of the House beginning in 1915, in his last term.

=== Congress ===
In 1918, Christopherson successfully ran for Congress from South Dakota's 1st congressional district. He was re-elected six times, but lost re-election in 1932 to Democrat Fred H. Hildebrandt. He ran against Hildebrandt again in 1934, but lost by a wider margin.

In 1936, Christopherson ran for the U.S. Senate, but lost in the Republican primary to Chan Gurney.

=== Later career ===
He subsequently returned to Sioux Falls full-time to pursue his legal career.

== Personal life ==
Christopherson married Abbie M. Deyoe (1871-1952) from Cedar Falls, Iowa on November 30, 1897. Her parents were both born in New York State. They had two children: Wanda M. and Charles A. Christopherson.

=== Affiliations ===
He and his family belonged to the Congregational Church. He participated in the Masons, the International Order of Odd Fellows, the Knights of Pythias, and the Elks.

== Death and burial ==
He died in 1951 and was buried at Woodlawn Cemetery in Minnehaha County, South Dakota.

U.S. House of Representatives
Preceded by Charles H. Dillon	Member of the U.S. House of Representatives from South Dakota's 1st congressional district 1919–1933	Succeeded by Fred H. Hildebrandt
