= Gladys Pyle =

American politician

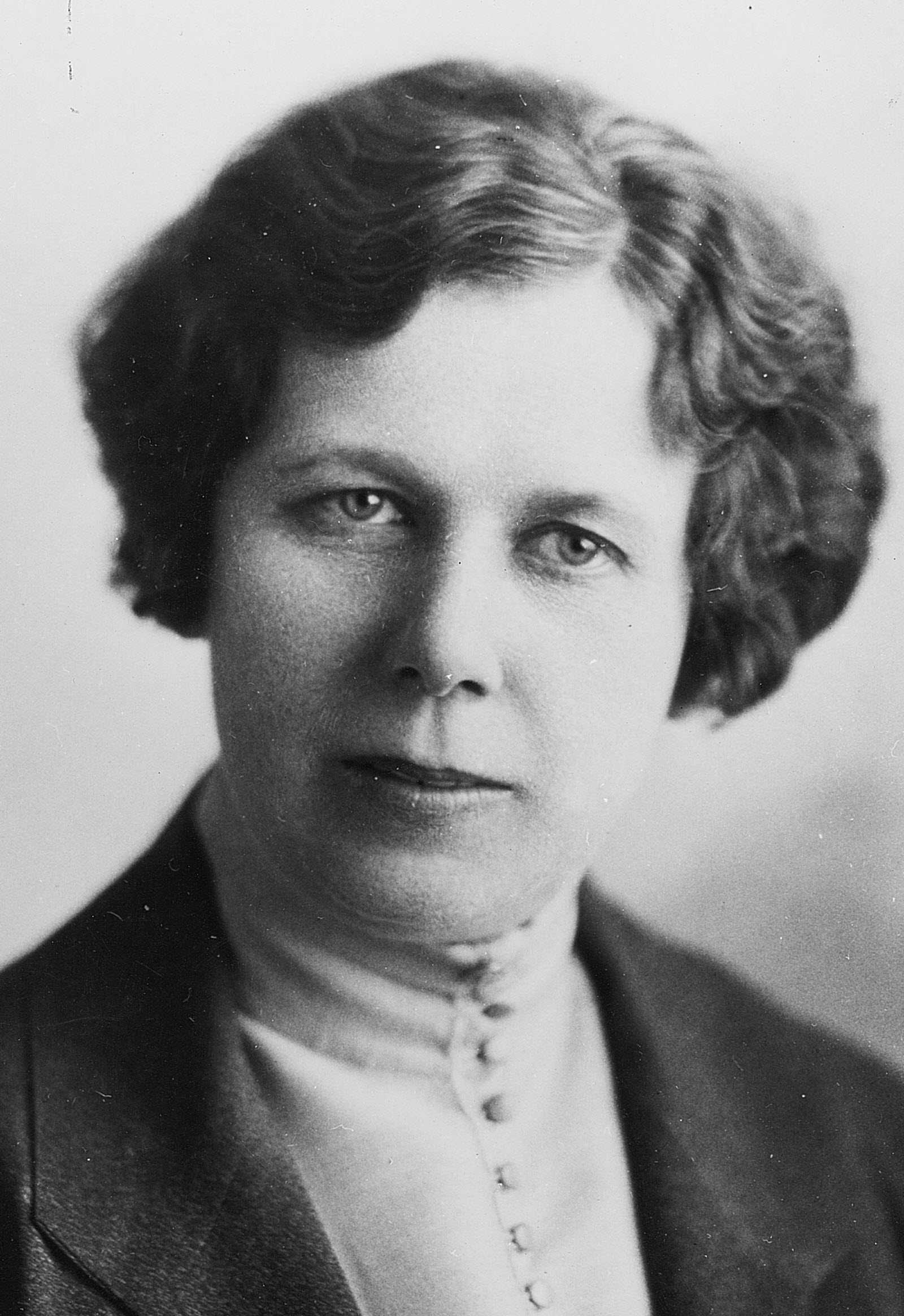

United States Senator from South Dakota
- In office November 9, 1938 – January 3, 1939
- Preceded by: Herbert Hitchcock
- Succeeded by: Chandler Gurney

Executive Officer of the South Dakota Securities Commission
- In office January 16, 1931 – January 15, 1933
- Governor: Warren Green
- Preceded by: A. L. Putnam
- Succeeded by: William J. Dawson

Secretary of State of South Dakota
- In office January 4, 1927 – January 6, 1931
- Governor: William Bulow
- Preceded by: Clarence Coyne
- Succeeded by: Elizabeth Coyne

Personal details
- Born: October 4, 1890 Huron, South Dakota, U.S.
- Died: March 14, 1989 (aged 98) Huron, South Dakota, U.S.
- Party: Republican
- Education: Huron University (BA)
- Profession: Teacher; Insurance broker

Gladys Shields Pyle (October 4, 1890 – March 14, 1989) was an American educator, politician and the first woman elected to the United States Senate without having previously been appointed to her position; she was also the first female senator to serve as a Republican and the first female senator from South Dakota. In addition, she was the first female senator from outside the south. (Note: The previous four had come from Georgia, Arkansas, Louisiana, and Alabama.)

== Early life ==
Gladys Shields Pyle was born in Huron, South Dakota on October 4, 1890, the daughter of John L. Pyle and Mamie Shields Pyle, and was the youngest of their four children, three girls and one boy. Her father was a lawyer who served as Attorney General of South Dakota and her mother was a leading suffragist in the state. The family lived in a home John built, remaining there after his death from typhoid fever in 1902.

John and Mamie were instrumental in the establishment of Huron College, which Gladys attended. While a student, Gladys competed in debates alongside her sisters. She graduated in 1911, and moved to Chicago to attend the American Conservatory of Music and the University of Chicago.

== Early career ==
Pyle worked in education from 1912 to 1920. After teaching Latin and civics for two years in Huron, she became principal of Wessington's public schools. Gladys, her mother Mamie, and two sisters were very involved in the Women's Suffrage movement and frequently hosted meetings of the local League of Women Voters chapter in their house. Pyle became a lecturer for the league and traveled to Indiana, Iowa, Nebraska, Kansas and Ohio to give speeches and make presentations.

In 1922, she ran for a seat in the South Dakota House of Representatives. After failing to gain the nomination through the Beadle County Republicans, Pyle ran in the Independent ticket primary, which she appeared to lose, but successfully contested the result. In the general election, she was the leading vote getter for the three at large House seats, and was elected on the Independent ticket, along with two Republicans. In 1923 she became first woman member of the state House of Representatives. She was reelected in 1924, and served from 1923 to 1927. In addition to her part-time legislative position, Pyle was also appointed to serve as Deputy Secretary of State of South Dakota.

== Secretary of State ==
In 1926, Pyle was the successful Republican nominee for Secretary of State of South Dakota. She was reelected in 1928, polling more votes than had ever been given any candidate for any office in the state, and served from 1927 to 1931.

In 1930, she was a candidate for the Republican nomination for governor. She won the primary, garnering nearly a third of the vote. Since no candidate received the 35% required under South Dakota law, the contest moved to the Republican Convention, where the delegates would select the nominee from the five candidates on the primary ballot. Pyle led the fourth, and sixth through eleven ballots, increasing her total votes each ballot, except for a significant loss of votes the eighth ballot as she was closing in on the nomination. During the 12th ballot, the Convention Chair suspended the roll call and over three hours later, three male candidates threw their support to Warren E. Green, who had run last in the primary with about 7.5% of the vote and who won the nomination when the roll call resumed. Pyle quickly conceded defeat without rancor or accusation but did not endorse Green until after the filing period for filing as an independent had ended. She later hinted at her disappointment when she indicated she would not seek further partisan political office. Pyle was executive officer for the State Securities Commission from 1931 to 1933.

While pursuing her political career, Pyle also became active in the life insurance business, and worked as an agent for several companies, including New York Life Insurance Company and Northwestern Mutual Life Insurance. In addition, she was elected president of the Huron Life Underwriters Association, and was active in the National Association of Life Underwriters.

== U.S. Senator ==
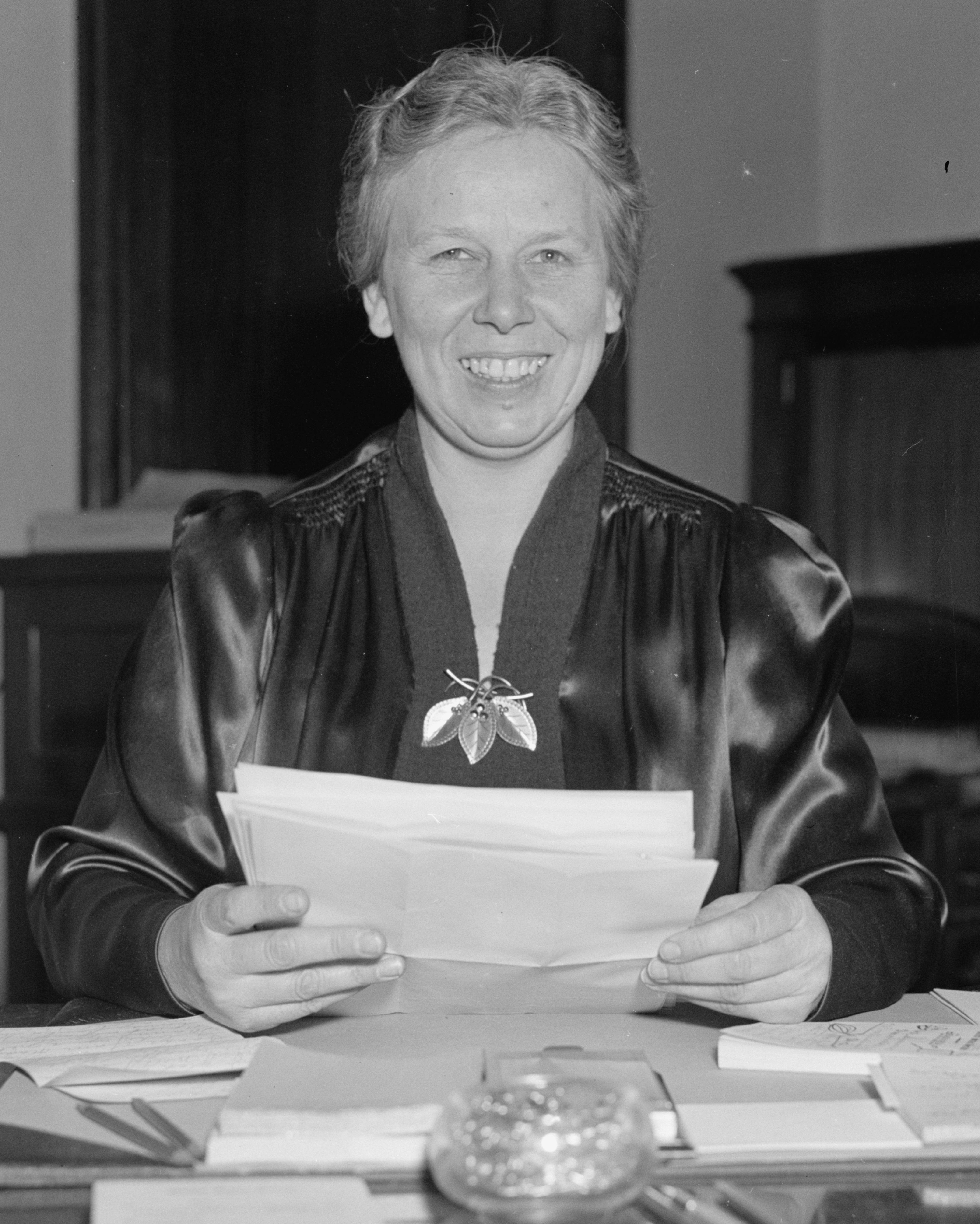
Pyle on November 28, 1938, during her brief Senate term

On November 8, 1938, she was elected as a Republican to the United States Senate, winning over 58% of the vote and receiving about 8,500 more votes than the second highest statewide election winner. Pyle received the highest percentage of the vote for non-incumbent Republican nominees and second highest percentage of the vote for all Republican nominees for the U. S. Senate in the 1938 elections. Pyle was elected to fill the vacancy caused by the death of Peter Norbeck. Norbeck died in December 1936, which allowed the governor of South Dakota to appoint a replacement, and he appointed Democrat Herbert E. Hitchcock. Hitchcock lost the primary for the Democratic nomination for a full term, and the general election was won by Republican Chan Gurney. Because he lost the Democratic nomination, a quirk in South Dakota law required Hitchcock to step down following the November 1938 election, which would have created a vacancy before Gurney's term began in January 1939. To fill the two month vacancy, South Dakota Republicans successfully pushed for a special election because of rumors that President Franklin D. Roosevelt would call a special session of Congress to be held before January. State law also prevented Gurney from appearing on the ballot twice, so he was unable to run in the special election.

As a result of these circumstances and the quirks in the law, the Republican Party prevailed upon Pyle, despite her pledge not seek any further partisan political office, to run in the special election, in part because of her popularity in the state, and in part because she had the name recognition that they would not have to devote many resources to the special election campaign. She campaigned against the New Deal, arguing the program had not gone far enough to help the people of South Dakota. On the same day that Gurney won election to a full term, Pyle easily defeated Democrat J. T. McCullen Sr. for the short one, running about 6 percentage points ahead of the winning percentage of the next highest statewide office election winner. Pyle was paid for her Senate service and allowed to hire staff, but the Congress was not in session and she was never sworn in.

After the election, Pyle traveled to Washington, D.C. at her own expense, accompanied by her mother and one aide. No special session was called, so Pyle did not have the opportunity to perform any official Senate duties before her term ended. She shared a Senate office with Thomas M. Storke, an appointed interim senator from California, and spent her time in Washington lobbying federal agencies including the Works Progress Administration and Bureau of Indian Affairs for approval of projects in South Dakota.

== Later career ==
In January 1939, Pyle returned to her insurance business, and remained closely involved in public service work. In 1940, she became the first woman to deliver a presidential nominating speech at a national convention, speaking on behalf of candidate Harland J. Bushfield.

In addition to resuming her career in the life insurance business, Pyle was the guardian for two orphaned boys and managed her family's 640-acre farm near Huron. She was a member of the South Dakota Board of Charities and Corrections from 1943 to 1957.

== Death and burial ==
In 1988, Pyle became the oldest living current or former U.S. senator. She died in Huron on March 14, 1989, aged 98. Her ashes are interred at Riverside Cemetery in Huron.

== Legacy ==
The Pyle House, the family home that Gladys Pyle lived in from 1894 until 1985 is on the National Register of Historic Places and has been converted into a museum. Pyle recorded her own recollections of the home before her death, in preparation for its conversion. It is largely unchanged from when it was built and has many of the original furnishings and interior decorations.

== See also ==
- Women in the United States Senate
- List of United States senators from South Dakota

== Notes ==
Political offices
Preceded by Clarence Coyne	Secretary of State of South Dakota; 1927–1931	Succeeded by Elizabeth Coyne
Party political offices
Preceded by Peter Norbeck	Republican nominee for U.S. Senator from South Dakota (Class 3); 1938	Succeeded by Chandler Gurney
U.S. Senate
Preceded by Herbert Hitchcock	United States Senator (Class 3) from South Dakota; 1938–1939; Served alongside: William Bulow	Succeeded by Chandler Gurney
Honorary titles
Preceded by Samuel Reynolds	Oldest living U.S. senator 1988–1989	Succeeded by Frank Briggs
