= Donald McMurchie =

American politician

21st Lieutenant Governor of South Dakota
- In office 1937–1941
- Governor: Leslie Jensen; Harlan J. Bushfield
- Preceded by: Robert Peterson
- Succeeded by: Albert C. Miller

Personal details
- Born: October 2, 1896 Clay County, South Dakota, United States
- Died: November 20, 1981 (aged 85) Sioux Falls, South Dakota, United States
- Party: Republican

Donald Clement McMurchie was an American politician who served as the 21st Lieutenant Governor of South Dakota from 1937 to 1941, firstly under Leslie Jensen and secondly under Harlan J. Bushfield, for the Republican Party.

== Biography ==
McMurchie was born on October 2, 1896, in Clay County, South Dakota, to James Duncan McMurchie and Jane Davis. He served as Lieutenant Governor of South Dakota from 1937 to 1941 for the Republican Party. McMurchie died on November 20, 1981, in Sioux Falls, South Dakota, and was buried in Wakonda, South Dakota.
