= 1934 South Dakota Senate election =

- November 6, 1934

45 seats in the South Dakota Senate 23 seats needed for a majority
	Majority party	Minority party
Leader	L. J. Larson (retired)	—
Party	Democratic	Republican
Leader since	1931
Leader's seat	9th (Aurora–Douglas)
Last election	30	15
Seats won	32	13
Seat change	▲2	▼2
Popular vote	59,233 (Note: Vote totals from multi-county districts only)	67,513
- Democratic gain Democratic hold Republican gain Republican hold Multi-member districts: Democratic majority Republican majority Democratic: 40–50% 50–60% Republican: 50–60% 60–70% Unopposed
President pro tempore before election
L. J. Larson
Democratic
Elected President pro tempore
Mancel Peterson
Democratic

Elections to the South Dakota Senate were held on November 6, 1934, to elect 45 candidates to the Senate to serve a two-year term in the 24th South Dakota Legislature. Democrats won thirty-two seats, a gain of two seats from the thirty they won at the 1932 general election, retaining their control of the chamber. Democratic Senator Mancel Peterson of Waubay was elected president pro tempore of the Senate.

Since the 1932 general election, Armstrong and Washabaugh counties (since merged into Stanley and Jackson, respectively) were folded into the 24th district, and Todd County was folded into the 26th district. No votes were recorded from Armstrong County.

This election took place alongside races for U.S. House, governor, state house, and numerous other state and local elections.

== See also ==
- List of South Dakota state legislatures
