= Larry Pressler =

American politician (born 1942)

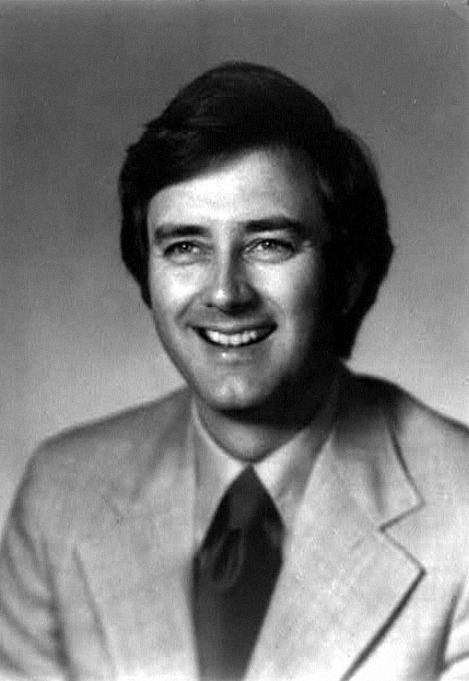
- Pressler in 1977

Chair of the Senate Commerce Committee
- In office January 3, 1995 – January 3, 1997
- Preceded by: Fritz Hollings
- Succeeded by: John McCain

United States Senator from South Dakota
- In office January 3, 1979 – January 3, 1997
- Preceded by: James Abourezk
- Succeeded by: Tim Johnson

Member of the U.S. House of Representatives from South Dakota's 1st district
- In office January 3, 1975 – January 3, 1979
- Preceded by: Frank E. Denholm
- Succeeded by: Tom Daschle

Personal details
- Born: Larry Lee Pressler; March 29, 1942 (age 84) Humboldt, South Dakota, U.S.
- Party: Democratic (before c. 1974); Republican (c. 1974–2013); Independent (2013–present)
- Spouse: Harriet Pressler
- Children: 1
- Education: University of South Dakota (BA); St Edmund Hall, Oxford (BA); Harvard University (MPA, JD)
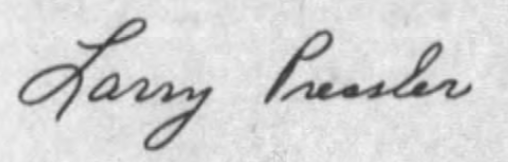
- Signature

Military service
- Allegiance: United States
- Branch: United States Army
- Service years: 1966–1968
- Rank: First Lieutenant
- Conflicts: Vietnam War
- Awards: Bronze Star Medal; Meritorious Unit Commendation; National Defense Service Medal; Vietnam Campaign Medal; Overseas Service Bar; Gallantry Cross

Larry Lee Pressler (born March 29, 1942) is an American lawyer and politician from South Dakota who served in the United States House of Representatives from 1975 to 1979, and United States Senate from 1979 to 1997, as a Republican. He briefly ran for the Republican nomination for President in 1980. He remained active in politics following his failed reelection campaign in 1996 and attempted to regain his former seat in 2014 as an independent, but was unsuccessful. He has since supported Democratic tickets.

Pressler is founder and president of the Pressler Group, a Service-Disabled Veteran-Owned Small Business, a small business to work on projects in service of veterans.

== Early life and education ==
Larry Lee Pressler was born in Humboldt, South Dakota, to Loretta Claussen and Antone Lewis Pressler and was raised on his family's farm. In 1961 he was selected as one of four 4-H members to attend the World Agricultural Fair in Cairo, Egypt. At the 1962 National 4-H Club Congress in Chicago, Illinois, he was one of two recipients of the national citizenship award and also selected to meet with President John F. Kennedy on March 4, 1963.

In 1963, he defeated Steve Byrnes with 1,014 to 909 votes and was elected as president of the University of South Dakota's Student Association to serve until 1964. He graduated from the university in 1964 and was later awarded a Rhodes Scholarship. Pressler attended St. Edmund Hall at Oxford University as a Rhodes Scholar and received a Bachelor of Arts degree. He returned to the United States and in 1966 completed his Master of Public Administration degree at Harvard University.

He joined the United States Army and served in the Vietnam War from 1966 until 1968. After returning from Vietnam as a first lieutenant, he served for several years in the United States Department of State as a Foreign Service Officer. He later attended the John F. Kennedy School of Government at Harvard University and Harvard Law School where he graduated in 1971. In 1970 he became the business manager of the Harvard Law Record.

== Career ==
=== House of Representatives ===
During the 1968 House elections Pressler considered running for the Democratic nomination for the 1st Congressional District, but chose not to run.

In 1974, he filed to run for the Republican nomination in the 1st District on the last day possible and later won it, but the South Dakota Republican Party told him that he would not be given any campaign funds. Despite the Watergate scandal hurting the Republicans nationally in the 1974 elections Pressler was one of six Republicans to gain a seat held by the Democrats.

In April 1975, he was accepted as a member of the Congressional Rural Caucus, later supported having open committee meetings for the House Republican Conference, and throughout the year he served as assistant minority leader to Minority Leader John Jacob Rhodes. On April 2, 1975, he was hospitalized at the Bethesda Naval Hospital to be treated for diverticulitis and had surgery in December for it. Later in the month he cosponsored legislation to create a House select committee to reinvestigate the assassinations of John F. Kennedy, Robert Kennedy, Martin Luther King Jr., and the attempted assassination of George Wallace. On July 30, the House voted 214 to 213 to increase its salary from $42,500 to $44,600. Pressler and eight other members of the House stated that they would not keep the raise given to members of Congress.

During the 1976 Republican presidential primaries, he criticized the rivalry between President Gerald Ford and former governor Ronald Reagan which he stated would hurt moderate Republicans as both Ford and Reagan were pushing their conservative stances.

In March 1976, Jack Anderson and Les Whitten claimed that multiple articles written by Pressler had been copied in their entirety from The Washington Post and other newspapers. Pressler denied the charge of plagiarism, but admitted that a January 1976 article had "accidentally" included excerpts from The Washington Post.

After winning reelection in 1976 with almost eighty percent of the vote, Pressler stated that he was interested in running for the Senate in 1978.

==== House committee assignments ====
- Committee on Education and Labor
- Committee on Science and Technology

=== Senate ===
In 1978, he was elected to the United States Senate, succeeding retiring Democratic incumbent James Abourezk and becoming the first Vietnam War veteran to serve in the Senate.

He served in the Senate from 1979 to 1997 and was chairman of the Commerce Committee (1995–1997). While in the Senate, he also served on the Science and Transportation Committee, Foreign Relations Committee and European and Asian Subcommittees. Pressler ran for a fourth term in 1996 but lost by three points to Democratic Congressman Tim Johnson.

Bumper sticker for Pressler's presidential campaign

He briefly sought the Republican presidential nomination in 1980, campaigning on Vietnam veterans' issues.

Pressler authored and won Congressional and Presidential approval of a sweeping reform of telecommunications legislation through the Telecommunications Act of 1996. Among Pressler's staffers included future U.S. Attorney Kevin V. Schieffer and future state senator Neal Tapio.

==== Abscam investigation ====
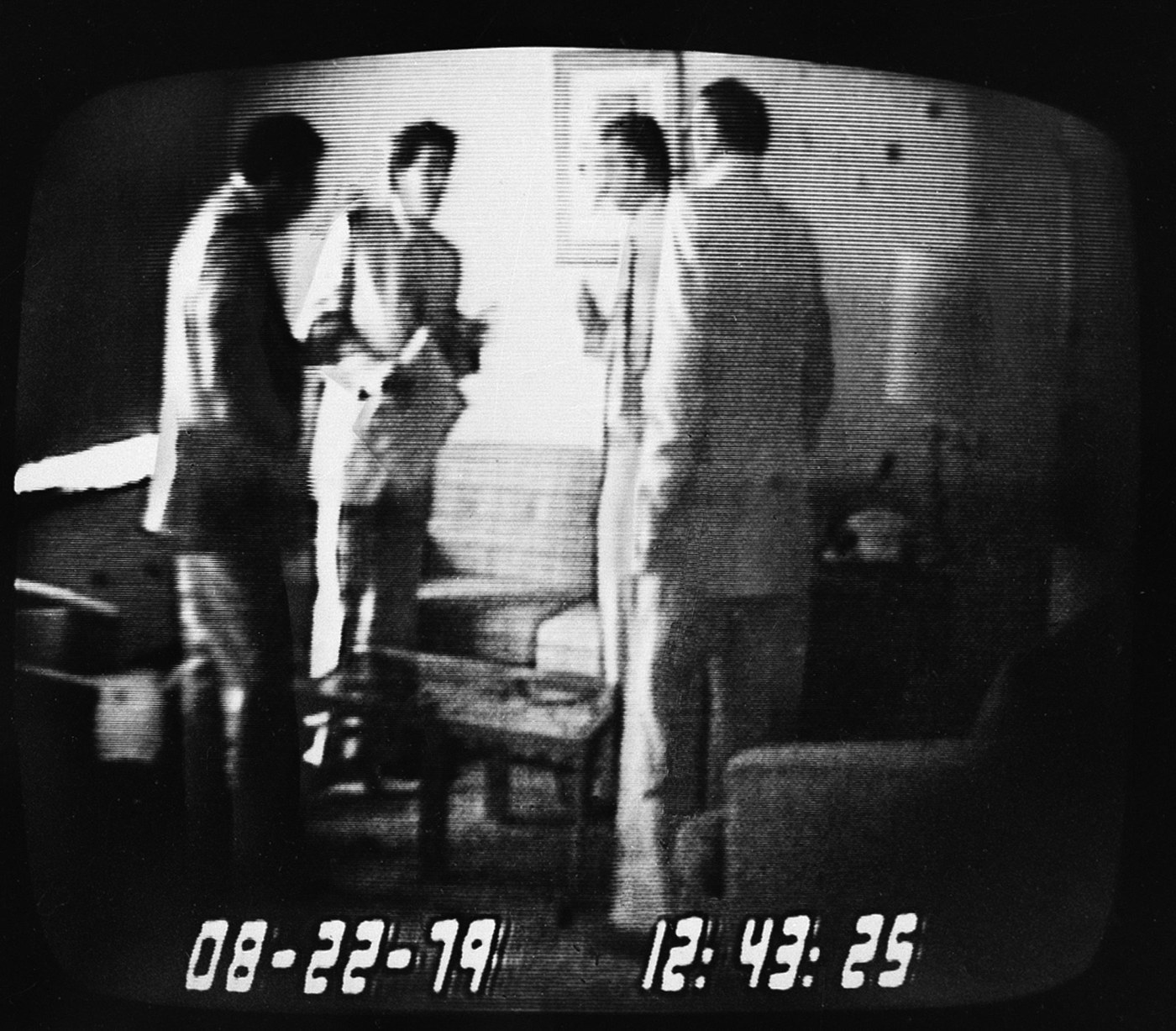
U.S. Representative Michael Myers, second from left, holds an envelope containing $50,000 that he just received from undercover FBI Agent Anthony Amoroso.

During a sting operation conduced as part of the Abscam investigations in 1980, Pressler refused to take a bribe from undercover FBI agents and reported the bribe attempt. In a front-page story, The Washington Post reported:

Thanks to the FBI's undercover "sting" operation, there now exists incontrovertible evidence that one senator would not be bought. Preserved among the videotape footage that may be used as bribery evidence against a number of members of Congress, there is a special moment in which Sen. Larry Pressler (R-SD) tells the undercover agents, in effect, to take their sting and stick it. Pressler, according to law enforcement sources was the one approached member of Congress who flatly refused to consider financial favors in exchange for legislative favors, as suggested by undercover agents posing as Arabs. At the time he said he was not aware that he was doing anything quite so heroic.

In an overall review of the Abscam cases, Judge George C. Pratt praised Pressler, writing that, "Pressler, particularly, acted as citizens have a right to expect their elected representatives to act. He showed a clear awareness of the line between proper and improper conduct, and despite his confessed need for campaign money, and despite the additional attractiveness to him of the payment offered, he nevertheless refused to cross into impropriety."

==== Pakistan and the Pressler Amendment ====
Pressler was also the sponsor of the Pressler Amendment, which banned most economic and military assistance to Pakistan unless the president certified on an annual basis that "Pakistan does not possess a nuclear explosive device and that the proposed United States assistance program will reduce significantly the risk that Pakistan will possess a nuclear explosive device."

=== Post-Senate career ===
After his defeat in the 1996 election, Pressler passed the New York bar and worked again as a lawyer. Pressler subsequently became senior partner of the law firm O'Connor and Hannan, where he served for six years, and then formed his own law firm, The Pressler Group. Pressler is a member of the New York Bar, the Washington, D.C. Bar, and the Supreme Court Bar.

He has also lectured at over 20 universities in China, India and the U.S., and has been granted two lifetime Fulbright teaching awards.

In 1998, Pressler considered a bid for Mayor of Washington, D.C., though he ultimately would not go through with it.

During the 2000 presidential election he served on Governor George W. Bush's presidential campaign on its Information Technology Steering Committee, and later served on the Bush Presidential Transition Team in 2001.

Pressler attempted a political comeback in 2002 by running for South Dakota's open at-large House seat but he essentially discontinued his campaign when Republican governor Bill Janklow unexpectedly entered the race.

Pressler was appointed an official observer of Ukraine's national election in December 2004.

On November 10, 2009, President Obama named Pressler to the U.S. Commission for the Preservation of America's Heritage Abroad. He also serves on the Military Compensation and Retirement Modernization Commission.

In October 2012, based on veterans' issues, Pressler endorsed Obama for a second term with an article in The Huffington Post and on national television networks. Pressler campaigned in a bipartisan team for Obama in the fall of 2012, speaking on behalf of the Obama ticket to certain veterans’ groups in Virginia.

He taught as a distinguished visiting professor at Sciences Po University, Paris, France, and Reims, France, in the fall of 2012. He chiefly teaches international relations to graduate students.

In 2013, Pressler was a signatory to an amicus curiae brief submitted to the Supreme Court in support of same-sex marriage during the Hollingsworth v. Perry case.

During the 2008 and 2012 presidential elections he endorsed and voted for Barack Obama. Pressler endorsed Hillary Clinton in the 2016 presidential election and Joe Biden in the 2020 presidential election.

Pressler continued his public lectures including a speech at Cardinal Stefan Wyszyński University in Warsaw, Poland, on June 4, 2018, for the 2018 International Security Forum.

In 2020, Pressler, along with over 130 other former Republican national security officials, signed a statement that asserted that Donald Trump was unfit to serve another term, and "To that end, we are firmly convinced that it is in the best interest of our nation that Vice President Joe Biden be elected as the next President of the United States, and we will vote for him."

=== 2014 U.S. Senate election ===
The Native American Times reported in November 2013 that Pressler, at the age of 71, was weighing an independent comeback bid for the seat vacated by retiring Democratic Senator Tim Johnson in the 2014 election. After being approached by a group of citizens asking him to run, Pressler assessed his chances of victory by saying, "I think it's possible but unlikely." At the conclusion of an exploratory tour of South Dakota's 66 counties in late 2013, however, Pressler announced his candidacy and stated confidently, "I intend to win." Pressler faced Republican former Governor Mike Rounds, Democratic congressional aide Rick Weiland, and independent conservative state legislator Gordon Howie in a four-way race.

Shortly before announcing his intention to run for office, Pressler explained his becoming an independent: "I don't think I've moved, I think the party has moved. I feel like a man without a party. … My intent is not to hurt anyone." During his unsuccessful campaign, Pressler did not commit to caucusing with either party in the Senate if elected. He stated that he would only serve for one term, and pledged that he would "never raise a dollar" in campaign funds while in office. Pressler has said that he views both parties as being "too entrenched in their respective ideologies at the expense of common sense solutions."

Pressler supported raising taxes on the rich, possibly gradually increasing the retirement age for Social Security. He said that his top priority was cutting the national deficit. He also supported "much, much stronger" background checks for gun sales for mentally challenged persons. According to the Argus Leader, Pressler was "adamantly opposed to military adventurism, supports expanding background checks on gun sales, favors restricting corporate donations to political campaigns and has called for a museum honoring Native Americans wiped out by white expansion." He had also voted for Barack Obama for president, citing "fiscally conservative reasons". Pressler stated his support for same-sex marriage and filed an amicus curiae brief to the Supreme Court in regard to Hollingsworth v. Perry.

During the 2014 campaign, Pressler was endorsed by South Dakota's two largest newspapers, the Sioux Falls Argus Leader and the Rapid City Journal, as well as The Daily Republic in Mitchell. The race also drew some national attention. The Wall Street Journal reported, "Republicans had been expected to easily win the open Senate seat in South Dakota this year, but the race has tightened recently. Earlier this month, Democrats began sending cash to the race after concluding the unusual, four-way race was winnable." The New York Times said, "A race that most had thought was safely Republican is suddenly the focus of national attention, thanks to the surprisingly successful candidacy of former Senator Larry Pressler, a Republican who is running as an independent."

Pressler ultimately lost the 2014 Senate election to Governor Rounds.

== Political positions ==
=== Domestic ===
==== Trade ====
In 1975, Pressler cosponsored a bill that would prohibit the importation of beef and dairy products to improve domestic sales of those products to help farmers and he later asked President Gerald Ford to place a tariff on all imported cheese products. He later sent a letter to Vern Loen, one of Ford's advisors, stating that Harry S. Truman's victory in the 1948 presidential election was due to his support among farmers in swing states. He stated that in order to gain the vote of farmers that Ford should impose tariffs on dairy products while subsidizing exporting dairy products, removing most favored nation trade status for countries that have restrictions on United States beef, dairy, and pork products, and to give equal priority to agricultural products that industrial products were given at the General Agreement on Tariffs and Trade.

=== Foreign ===
==== Foreign aid ====
The House of Representatives voted 212–202 in favor of allotting $3.5 billion to foreign aid in the 1975 budget with Pressler voting against it stating that the United States couldn't afford to give money to foreign countries and criticized the $1 billion given to Middle Eastern countries for weapons. On September 2, 1975, he criticized the Sinai Interim Agreement as it would have as it would give $2.8 billion to Israel, $2.3 billion to Egypt, Jordan, and other Arab states, and require the United States to send 100 technicians to observe the Israeli-Egyptian border. On April 28, 1976, he voted against a $3.2 billion foreign military aid increase as it would be given to both sides participating in the Cyprus dispute.

==== Military ====
On April 28, 1975, Pressler stated that American military bases in Europe should be relocated to the United States to improve the economy and due to European aggravation against the United States military presence. After President Ford gave his State of the Union Address in 1976 Pressler criticized him for not offering national defense spending cuts.

==== Vietnam War ====
In 1975 Pressler supported a bill to create a Missing In Action select committee to investigate the 921 cases of soldiers still missing in action from the Vietnam War.

== Personal life ==
Pressler is married to Harriet Pressler. The couple has one daughter and four grandchildren. In 2015, at the age of 73, Pressler converted to the Church of Jesus Christ of Latter-day Saints.

== Electoral history ==
1974 South Dakota's 1st Congressional District Republican primary
Party	Candidate	Votes	%	±%
Republican	Larry Pressler	22,724	50.15%	
Republican	Ione Larsen	13,940	30.76%	
Republican	Cornelis VanHelden	8,650	19.09%	
Total votes		45,314	100.00%	

1974 South Dakota's 1st Congressional District election
Party	Candidate	Votes	%	±%
Republican	Larry Pressler	78,266	55.27%	+15.80%
Democratic	Frank E. Denholm (incumbent)	63,339	44.73%	−15.80%
Total votes		141,605	100.00%	

1976 South Dakota's 1st Congressional District election
Party	Candidate	Votes	%	±%
Republican	Larry Pressler (incumbent)	121,587	79.78%	+24.51%
Democratic	James V. Guffey	29,533	19.38%	−25.35%
Independent	Donald Stevens	1,282	0.84%	+0.84%
Total votes		152,402	100.00%	

1978 South Dakota Senate Republican primary
Party	Candidate	Votes	%	±%
Republican	Larry Pressler	66,893	73.88%	
Republican	Ron Williamson	23,646	26.12%	
Total votes		45,314	100.00%	

1978 South Dakota Senate election
Party	Candidate	Votes	%	±%
Republican	Larry Pressler	170,832	66.84%	+23.88%
Democratic	Don Barnett	84,767	33.16%	−23.88%
Total votes		255,599	100.00%	

1984 South Dakota Senate election
Party	Candidate	Votes	%	±%
Republican	Larry Pressler (incumbent)	235,176	66.84%	+7.65%
Democratic	George V. Cunningham	80,537	25.51%	−7.65%
Total votes		315,713	100.00%	

1990 South Dakota Senate election
Party	Candidate	Votes	%	±%
Republican	Larry Pressler (incumbent)	135,682	52.39%	−14.45%
Democratic	Ted Muenster	116,727	45.07%	+19.56%
Independent	Dean L. Sinclair	6,567	2.54%	+2.54%
Total votes		258,976	100.00%	

1996 South Dakota Senate election
Party	Candidate	Votes	%	±%
Democratic	Tim Johnson	166,533	51.32%	+6.25%
Republican	Larry Pressler (incumbent)	157,954	48.68%	−3.71%
Total votes		324,487	100.00%	

2014 South Dakota Senate election
Party	Candidate	Votes	%	±%
Republican	Mike Rounds	140,741	50.37%	+12.86%
Democratic	Rick Weiland	82,456	29.51%	−32.98%
Independent	Larry Pressler	47,741	17.09%	+17.09%
Independent	Gordon Howie	8,474	3.03%	+3.03%
Total votes		279,412	100.00%	

U.S. House of Representatives
Preceded by Frank Denholm	Member of the U.S. House of Representatives from South Dakota's 1st congressional district 1975–1979	Succeeded by Tom Daschle
Party political offices
Preceded by Robert Hirsch	Republican nominee for U.S. Senator from South Dakota (Class 2); 1978, 1984, 1990, 1996	Succeeded by John Thune
U.S. Senate
Preceded by James Abourezk	U.S. Senator (Class 2) from South Dakota; 1979–1997; Served alongside: George McGovern, James Abdnor, Tom Daschle	Succeeded by Tim Johnson
Preceded by Bob Kasten	Ranking Member of the Senate Small Business Committee; 1993–1995	Succeeded by Dale Bumpers
Preceded by Fritz Hollings	Chair of the Senate Commerce Committee; 1995–1997	Succeeded by John McCain
U.S. order of precedence (ceremonial)
Preceded by Byron Dorgan as Former U.S. Senator	Order of precedence of the United States as Former U.S. Senator	Succeeded by Jon Tester as Former U.S. Senator
