= Hans Ustrud =

American politician (1871–1943)

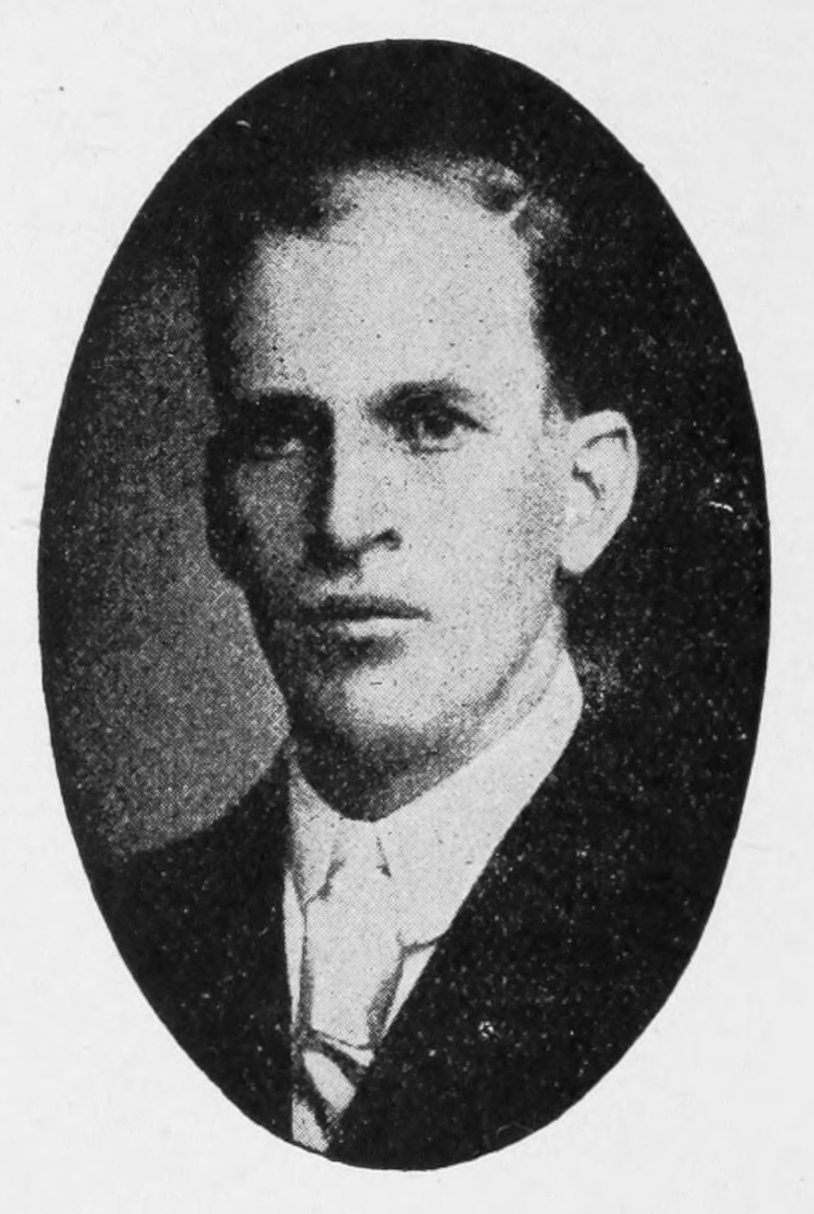

Lieutenant Governor of South Dakota
- In office 1933–1935
- Governor: Tom Berry
- Preceded by: Odell K. Whitney
- Succeeded by: Robert Peterson

Personal details
- Born: November 4, 1871; Minnehaha County, Dakota Territory
- Died: April 20, 1943 (aged 71); Sioux Falls, South Dakota, US
- Political party: Republican
- Spouse: Pauline Dahl (m. 1908; died 1920)

Hans Andreas Ustrud (November 4, 1871 – April 20, 1943) was an American educator and politician from the U.S. state of South Dakota. A Republican, Ustrud served as lieutenant governor of South Dakota and superintendent of public instruction.

== Early life ==
Ustrud was born near Baltic in Minnehaha County, Dakota Territory, on November 4, 1871. He was the third child born to Julia (née Kaasa) and Halvor O. Ustrud, who had immigrated from Norway in 1866 and settled in Minnehaha County in 1868. Ustrud graduated from the Lutheran Normal School in 1895, and taught in Dane County, Wisconsin, and Sioux Falls, South Dakota.

== Political career ==
In 1902, Ustrud was elected as a Republican as superintendent of schools for Minnehaha County. In 1906, he was elected state superintendent, becoming the first native South Dakotan elected to a statewide office. Ustrud served as state superintendent until 1911, and returned to teaching. In 1914, Ustrud joined the Progressive Party. He was a candidate for South Dakota's 1st congressional district in the 1914 elections, but withdrew his candidacy before the election. He served on the state board of railroad commissioners from 1915 through 1920, and as state rural school inspector from 1921 until 1924. He then worked for Carl Gunderson, the governor of South Dakota.

In the 1926 gubernatorial election, Ustrud broke with the Republican Party in supporting William J. Bulow, a member of the Democratic Party, for governor of South Dakota. Ustrud ran as a Democrat for superintendent of public instruction in 1926, but lost to the incumbent, C. J. St. John. He served as assistant director of taxation during Bulow's administration.

Running as a Democrat, Ustrud won the 1932 election for lieutenant governor. During his tenure, Ustrud opposed Governor Tom Berry's proposed gross receipts tax, instead calling for a net income tax. After the gross receipts tax was passed, Ustrud called for its repeal.

Ustrud ran for the Democratic nomination for governor of South Dakota against Berry in the 1934 election. Ustrud lost the nomination to Berry, and supported the Republican nominee, W. C. Allen, in the general election. Ustrud was the South Dakota Farmer–Labor Party's nominee for lieutenant governor in 1936, but did not qualify for the general election ballot. He was elected secretary-treasurer of the South Dakota Progressive Federation in 1938.

== Personal life ==
On November 3, 1908, Ustrud married Pauline Dahl. She died on February 21, 1920. Ustrud died of a heart attack on April 20, 1943, in Sioux Falls.
