= 1938 United States Senate elections in South Dakota =

- November 8, 1938
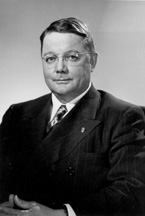

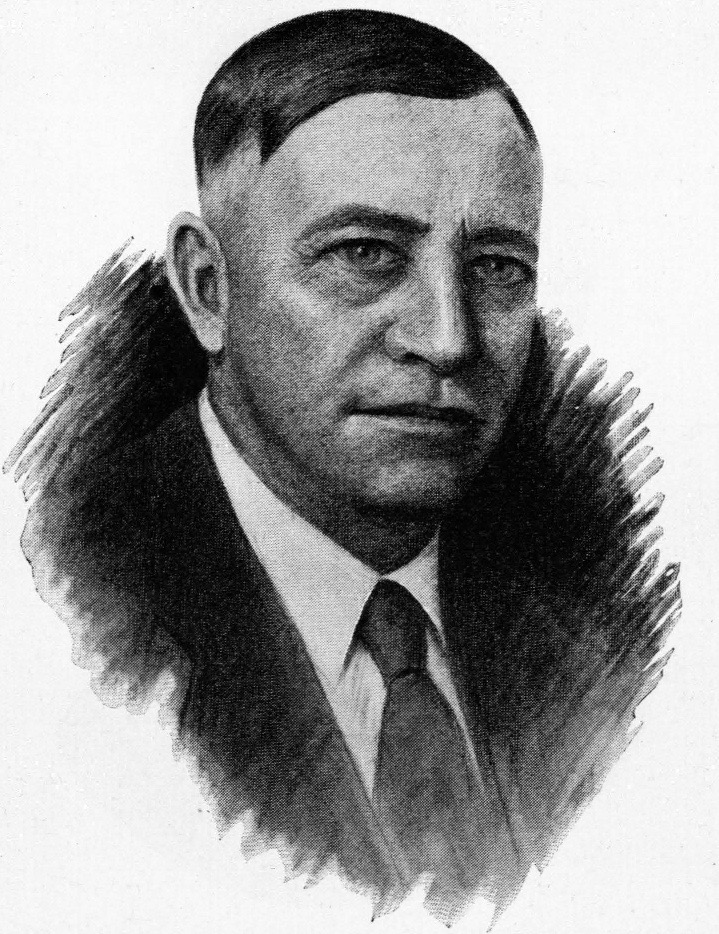
| Nominee | Chan Gurney | Tom Berry |
| Party | Republican | Democratic |
| Popular vote | 146,813 | 133,064 |
| Percentage | 52.46% | 47.54% |
- County results Gurney: 50–60% 60–70% 70–80% Berry: 50–60% 60–70% No Vote
U.S. senator before election
Herbert E. Hitchcock
Democratic
Elected U.S. Senator
Chan Gurney
Republican

The 1938 United States Senate elections in South Dakota took place on November 8, 1938. Incumbent Republican Senator Peter Norbeck died in office on December 20, 1936. Herbert E. Hitchcock was appointed by Governor Tom Berry as Norbeck's replacement. Two elections for the same Senate seat were held on the same day; one as a special election to fill the remainder of Norbeck's six-year term, and another to select a Senator to serve the next six-year term.

In the regularly scheduled election, Hitchcock ran for election for a full term, but was overwhelmingly defeated in the Democratic primary by former Governor Berry. In the Republican primary, businessman Chan Gurney won a slim plurality in a crowded primary. Gurney narrowly defeated Berry to win his first of two terms in the Senate. In the special election for the final few months of Norbeck's term, former Secretary of State Gladys Pyle won the Republican nomination unopposed, and Thomas W. Crawford won the Democratic nomination unopposed. However, following Crawford's death, the state Democratic Party named John T. McCullen as its replacement nominee. Pyle defeated McCullen in a landslide, becoming the first woman to represent South Dakota in the United States Senate.

== Democratic primary ==
=== Regular election ===
==== Candidates ====
- Tom Berry, former Governor of South Dakota
- Fred H. Hildebrandt, U.S. Congressman from South Dakota's 1st congressional district
- Herbert E. Hitchcock, incumbent U.S. Senator

=== Results ===
Democratic primary
| Party | Candidate | Votes | % |
|---|---|---|---|
| Democratic | Tom Berry | 46,292 | 63.04% |
| Democratic | Fred Hildebrandt | 17,391 | 23.68% |
| Democratic | Herbert Hitchcock (inc.) | 9,750 | 13.28% |
| Total votes | | 73,433 | 100.00% |

=== Special election ===
Thomas M. Crawford was the only Democratic candidate to file for the special election, thereby removing the primary election from the ballot and granting him the nomination by default. However, after the primary election took place, Crawford died. The Democratic Party of South Dakota named John T. McCullen, a former State Senator from Hand County, as its replacement nominee.

== Republican primary ==
=== Regular election ===
==== Candidates ====
- Chan Gurney, businessman
- Leslie Jensen, Governor of South Dakota
- George J. Danforth, former State Senator, 1926 Republican candidate for U.S. Senate
- Paul E. Bellamy, businessman

==== Results ====
Republican primary
| Party | Candidate | Votes | % |
|---|---|---|---|
| Republican | Chan Gurney | 49,371 | 46.75% |
| Republican | Leslie Jensen | 40,917 | 38.75% |
| Republican | George J. Danforth | 8,883 | 8.41% |
| Republican | Paul E. Bellamy | 6,434 | 6.09% |
| Total votes | | 105,605 | 100.00% |

=== Special election ===
Former Secretary of State Gladys Pyle announced that she would run for the Republican nomination for the special election. She, like Crawford, won the Republican nomination unopposed and the race did not appear on the primary election ballot.

== General election ==
=== Results ===
==== Regular election ====
1938 United States Senate election in South Dakota
| Party | Candidate | Votes | % | ±% |
|---|---|---|---|---|
| Republican | Chan Gurney | 146,813 | 52.46% | −1.37% |
| Democratic | Tom Berry | 133,064 | 47.54% | +2.97% |
| Majority | | 13,749 | 4.91% | −4.34% |
| Turnout | | 279,877 | | |
| Republican gain from Democratic | | | | |

==== Special election ====
Special election county results Pyle: 50–60%; 60–70%; 70–80%; 80–90%; McCullen: 50–60%; Tie No Vote

1938 United States Senate special election in South Dakota
| Party | Candidate | Votes | % | ±% |
|---|---|---|---|---|
| Republican | Gladys Pyle | 155,292 | 58.06% | +4.23% |
| Democratic | John T. McCullen | 112,177 | 41.94% | −2.63% |
| Majority | | 43,115 | 16.12% | +6.86% |
| Turnout | | 267,469 | | |
| Republican gain from Democratic | | | | |
