= Ben Reifel =

American public administrator and politician (1906–1990)

- Wíyaka Waŋžíla
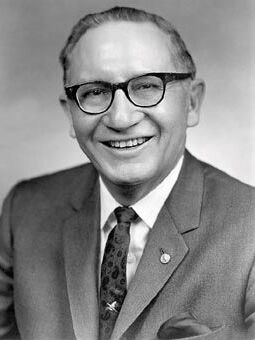

Interim Commissioner of Indian Affairs
- In office 1976–1977
- President: Gerald Ford
- Preceded by: Morris Thompson
- Succeeded by: Forrest Gerard (as Asst. Sec. of the Interior for Indian Affairs)

Member of the U.S. House of Representatives from South Dakota's 1st district
- In office January 3, 1961 – January 3, 1971
- Preceded by: George McGovern
- Succeeded by: Frank E. Denholm

Personal details
- Born: Benjamin Reifel; September 19, 1906 Rosebud Indian Reservation, South Dakota, U.S.
- Died: January 2, 1990 (aged 83) Sioux Falls, South Dakota, U.S.
- Citizenship: Rosebud Sioux Tribe of the Rosebud Indian Reservation; American
- Party: Republican
- Spouses: Alice Janet Johnson (m. 1933; died 1972); Frances Colby (m. 1972)
- Children: Loyce Nadine Reifel
- Education: South Dakota State College (BA); Harvard University (MPA, PhD)
- Profession: Federal civil service

Benjamin Reifel (/ˈraɪfʊl/ RIFLE; September 19, 1906 – January 2, 1990), also known as Lone Feather (Lakota: Wíyaka Waŋžíla), was a Sicangu Lakota public administrator and politician. He had a career with the Bureau of Indian Affairs, retiring as area administrator. He ran for the US Congress from the East River region of South Dakota and was elected as the first Lakota to serve in the House of Representatives. He served five terms as a Republican United States congressman from the (now obsolete) first district, from 1961 to 1971.

== Early life and education ==
Reifel was born in a log cabin near Parmelee, South Dakota, on the Rosebud Indian Reservation. He was the son of Lucy Burning Breast, a Sicangu Lakota, and William Reifel, of German descent. Ben Reifel was an enrolled citizen of the Rosebud Sioux Tribe of the Rosebud Indian Reservation, and his Lakota name, Wíyaka Waŋžíla means "Lone Feather" in English. He attended a Todd County school as well as the Rosebud Reservation boarding school as a child. He graduated at the age of 16 from the eighth grade, speaking both English and Lakota.

For three years Reifel worked on his family's farm before entering the School of Agriculture, a vocational high school in Brookings, South Dakota. After finishing high school in 1928, Reifel enrolled at South Dakota State College. He paid his own tuition for his first four years of schooling. He took out one of the first loans offered to Native American students under a Merriam Report-recommended Indian education program. Reifel graduated with a B.S. in agriculture in 1932. He was elected the President of the Students' Association during his senior year.

== Career ==
Following his graduation in 1932, Reifel was hired by Hare's School in Mission, South Dakota as an adviser for boys. He began working at the Bureau of Indian Affairs (BIA) in 1933; he was assigned to the Pine Ridge Indian Reservation as a farm agent to the Oglala Lakota. After a year, he was promoted to field agent at the Pierre, South Dakota regional headquarters.

Reifel's duties included promoting the new programs of the Indian Reorganization Act, signed by President Franklin D. Roosevelt in 1934. Allotment of reservation lands was ended, to enable tribes to hold communal lands and better preserve their territories. Under the new law, tribes could reorganize self governments. They were encouraged to write constitutions and to use models of elected government proposed by the BIA, rather than the life chiefs previously supported by the clans.

The American Indian people had endured hard times during the Great Depression, as well as the drought that caused Dust Bowl conditions in some parts of the Great Plains. Reifel was largely successful in garnering support for the Act. He started at Pine Ridge and later made his way to other reservations in South Dakota, ensuring that the programs of the Bureau were effective in the South Dakota reservations.

=== World War II ===
Reifel's BIA career was interrupted by World War II. In 1931, he had been commissioned as a second lieutenant in the United States Army Reserve. In March 1942, the Army ordered Reifel to active duty, and he served until July 1946. He was promoted to the rank of lieutenant colonel.

== Postwar career ==
After being discharged, Reifel continued working for the BIA. He was selected as a Tribal Relations Officer at Pine Ridge and later promoted to the position as Superintendent of the Fort Berthold Indian Reservation in North Dakota.

=== Harvard ===
In 1949, Reifel was awarded a scholarship to study public administration at Harvard University under a Civil Service Commission program for management development of career government officials. He earned his master's degree in 1949. He received a John Hay Whitney Foundation Opportunity Fellowship and completed his Doctorate in Public Administration in 1952. Following his graduation, Reifel returned to the BIA.

He worked briefly at its national headquarters in Washington, D.C. before returning to the Fort Berthold Indian Reservation as Superintendent. Reifel later served as Superintendent at the Pine Ridge Indian Reservation.

In 1955 he was promoted as the Area Director of the Aberdeen Area Office in Aberdeen, South Dakota. He was responsible for numerous employees and the application of federal programs and policies for American Indians of a three-state region: Nebraska, North Dakota and South Dakota. He served as administrator until his retirement from the BIA in 1960.

=== Political career ===
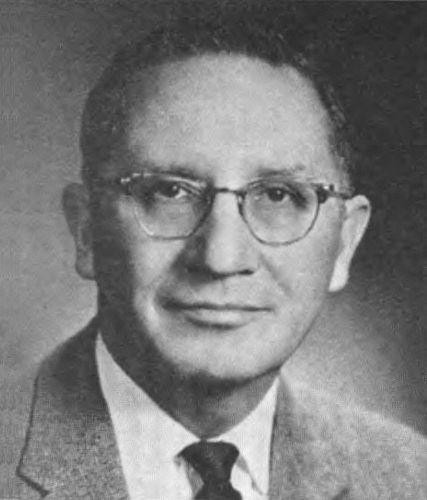
Ben Reifel (Rosebud Lakota), U.S. Representative from South Dakota's 1st Congressional District, 1961–71.

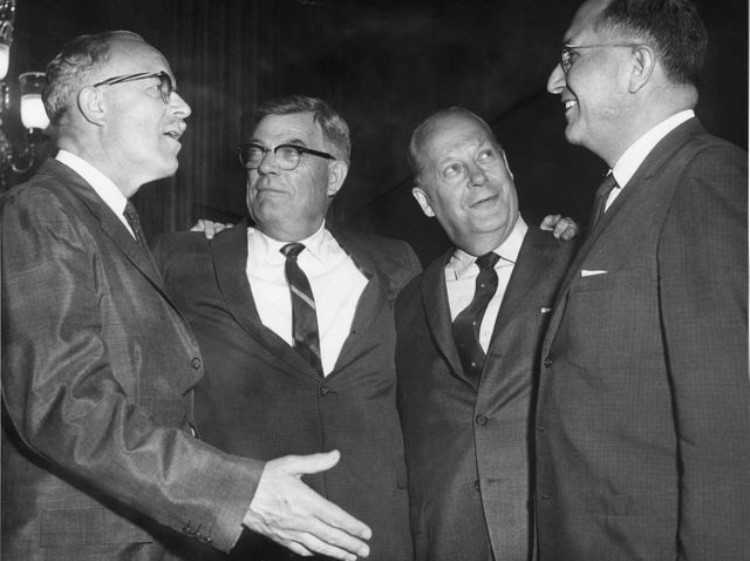
South Dakota's congressional delegation in the 87th U.S. Congress. L-R: Ellis Y. Berry, Joseph H. Bottum, Karl E. Mundt, and Ben Reifel.

In 1960, Reifel retired from the BIA and ran for Congress in South Dakota's 1st congressional district. At the time it included all of the counties east of the Missouri River, colloquially known as East River. (The district was redrawn in 1931 to include 21 counties in the southeast part of the state.) Reifel was elected by a substantial margin; he was the first person of Lakota or Sioux descent to serve in the US Congress. During the 1960s, he was the only American Indian in Congress. He served for five terms as Representative from South Dakota and was regarded as a conservative Republican.

In Congress Reifel held several committee assignments. In his first term, he was appointed to the House Agricultural Committee; in his second, to the House Committee on Appropriations. He served as the ranking Republican on the House Appropriations subcommittee on Interior Department Affairs. He worked hard for farming interests in South Dakota and the Plains states in general, opposing cuts in farm support programs, pushing the Oahe Dam to supply water for irrigation, and similar matters.

At the same time, he continued to work vigorously for American Indian education. Opposing segregation, he believed that the key to ending the isolation of the Native American people was in educational programs that enrolled American Indian and non-Indian students together in modern progressive facilities, as was recommended by the 1928 Meriam Report, rather than keeping children in Indian-only boarding schools. Reifel supported the Civil Rights Act of 1968 and an increase in the minimum wage.

Reifel was instrumental in getting the Center for Earth Resources Observation and Science (EROS) of the US Geological Survey located in South Dakota. In addition, he gained support to keep Ellsworth Air Force Base as an active military base in the state. On a broader national level, he was instrumental in securing passage of legislation to create the National Endowment for the Humanities and the National Arts Council.

In 1970, Reifel decided not to seek reelection. While he intended to retire in 1971, he remained active, accepting an appointment by President Richard Nixon as chair of the National Capital Planning Commission, which has oversight over federal projects in the Washington, DC metropolitan area. He next served as Special Assistant for Indian programs to the Director of the National Park Service in the Department of the Interior. He also served as Interim Commissioner of Indian Affairs during the last two months of the Ford administration.

== Later years ==
Throughout the 1960s and 1970s, Reifel was a member of the Masons, Rotarians, and Elks. He also served on the National Council of the Protestant Episcopal Church and the National Council of the Boy Scouts of America. He also served as national president of Arrow, Inc., a Native American service organization.

In 1977, Reifel became a trustee of the South Dakota Art Museum in Brookings. He served terms as the board president in 1982–83. He established the first Native American collection at the Art Museum in 1977, donating most of his personal collection.

== Legacy and honors ==
- 1956, Outstanding American Indian Award.
- 1960, awarded the Annual Indian Achievement Award from the Indian Council Fire.
- 1960, received the Silver Antelope Award from the Boy Scouts of America, as well as the Gray Wolf, Silver Buffalo and Silver Beaver Awards in Scouting.
- 1961, received the Distinguished Service Award from the Department of the Interior for his career with the BIA.
- The Ben Reifel Visitor Center in Badlands National Park was named in his honor.
- Reifel received honorary doctorates from South Dakota State University, the University of South Dakota, and Northern State College.
- A dorm on the South Dakota State University campus was named after him and opened in 2015.
- 2018, became the namesake of a new middle school in the Sioux Falls School District.

== Marriage and family ==
On December 26, 1933, Reifel married his college sweetheart, Alice Janet Johnson of Erwin, South Dakota. They had a daughter, Loyce Nadine Reifel. She married Emery Andersen. Alice Reifel died of pneumonia on February 8, 1972.

Ben Reifel remarried on August 14, 1972 to Frances Colby of DeSmet, South Dakota. He died of cancer on January 2, 1990.

== See also ==
- List of Native Americans in the United States Congress
- List of Native American politicians

U.S. House of Representatives
Preceded by George McGovern	United States Representative for the 1st congressional district of South Dakota; 1961–1971	Succeeded by Frank E. Denholm
