= Leslie Jensen =

American politician (1892–1964)

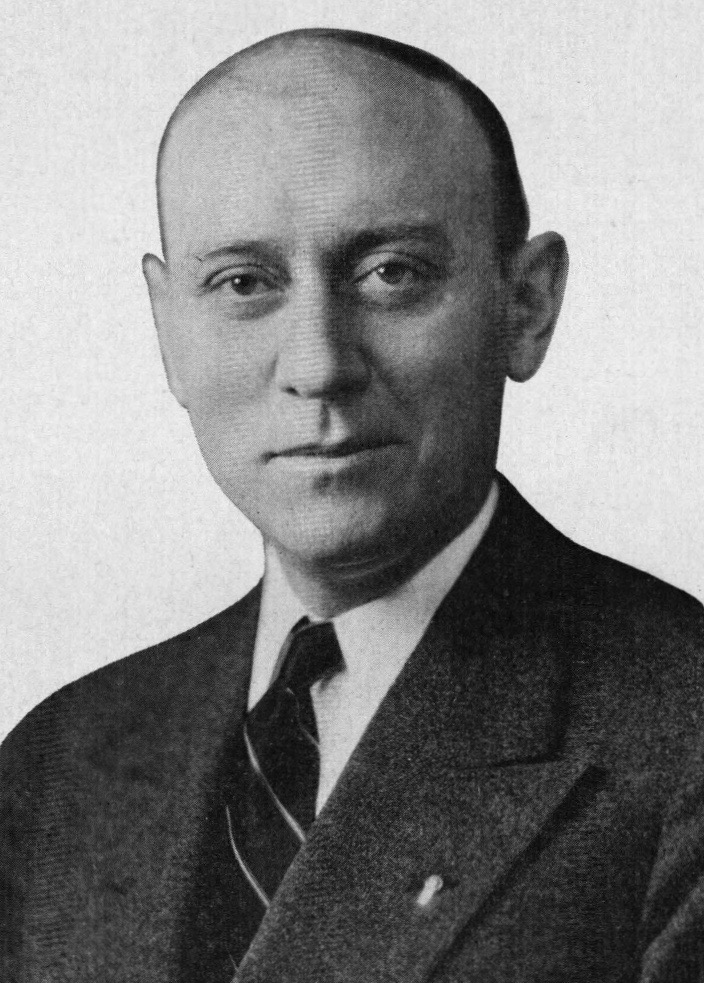

15th Governor of South Dakota
- In office January 5, 1937 – January 3, 1939
- Lieutenant: Donald McMurchie
- Preceded by: Tom Berry
- Succeeded by: Harlan J. Bushfield

Personal details
- Born: September 15, 1892 Hot Springs, South Dakota, U.S.
- Died: December 14, 1964 (aged 72) Rapid City, South Dakota, U.S.
- Party: Republican
- Spouse: Elizabeth Ward
- Education: University of South Dakota
- Profession: Attorney; Businessman

Leslie Jensen (September 15, 1892 – December 14, 1964) was an American businessman and politician who served as the 15th governor of South Dakota.

== Early life and military career ==
Leslie Jensen was born in Hot Springs, South Dakota. In 1916 and 1917, he was a Second Lieutenant in the South Dakota National Guard 4th Infantry Regiment during the 1916 Mexican border expedition. From 1917 to 1919 he was a Captain in the 147th Artillery Regiment with the American Expeditionary Forces. He received an LL.B. degree from the University of South Dakota School of Law in 1921. He married Elizabeth Ward and they had three children.

== Career ==
From 1922 until 1934 Jensen was a collector for the Internal Revenue Service. He became president and general manager of the People's Telephone and Telegraph Company.

In 1936, Jensen, a Republican, defeated incumbent Governor Tom Berry as South Dakota Governor. He served from 1937 until 1939. During Jensen's single term as governor, the legislature created a state department to implement the new federal Social Security Act. In addition, despite the financial demands of the relief effort, the Jensen administration was able to balance South Dakota's general fund and eliminate a twenty-year-old overdraft as well as to reduce the state's bonded indebtedness and provide for refunding of rural credit bonds at lower rates of interest. In 1938, the South Dakota Division of the Motor Patrol was formed under Governor Jensen. Harlan J. Bushfield, former Republican state chairman, succeeded Leslie Jensen as governor.

In 1938, Jensen opted to run for a seat in the U.S. Senate, rather than seek reelection to the governorship. However, he was narrowly defeated by businessman Chan Gurney in the Republican primary.

In 1940 Jensen was called to active military duty for World War II, serving in the Pacific Theater as a Colonel commanding the 147th Artillery Regiment, later serving on the staff of the Sixth United States Army. He returned to Hot Springs after the war, remaining active until his death.

== Death ==
Jensen died in an automobile accident in Rapid City and is buried in Evergreen Cemetery, Hot Springs, Fall River County, South Dakota, US. The Leslie Jensen Scenic Highway, part of US Route 18, was named in his honor. In 1987, the Governor Leslie Jensen House, his family residence was registered in the National Register of Historic Places listings in Fall River County, South Dakota.

Party political offices
Preceded by William C. Allen	Republican nominee for Governor of South Dakota; 1936	Succeeded by Harlan J. Bushfield
Political offices
Preceded by Tom Berry	Governor of South Dakota; 1937–1939	Succeeded by Harlan J. Bushfield
