= Frank E. Denholm =

American politician

Frank Denholm
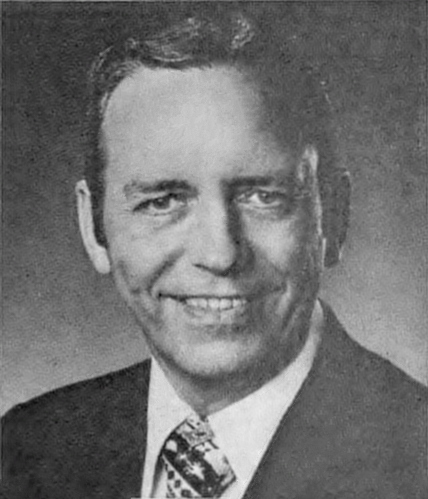

Member of the U.S. House of Representatives from South Dakota's 1st district
- In office January 3, 1971 – January 3, 1975
- Preceded by: Ben Lone Feather Reifel
- Succeeded by: Larry Pressler

Personal details
- Born: Franklin Edvard Denholm; November 29, 1923 Day County, South Dakota, U.S.
- Died: April 7, 2016 (aged 92) Brookings, South Dakota, U.S.
- Party: Democratic
- Education: South Dakota State University; University of South Dakota; University of Minnesota
- Occupation: Attorney

Franklin Edvard Denholm (November 29, 1923 – April 7, 2016) was a member of the United States House of Representatives from South Dakota.

== Early life and education ==
He was born in Scotland Township of Day County, South Dakota. He was educated in the public schools of the area, and graduated from South Dakota State University in 1956. He went on to receive his J.D. from the University of South Dakota School of Law, and continued to do post-graduate work in the field of public administration at the University of Minnesota.

== Career ==
Denholm worked as a farmer and auctioneer, and engaged in the business of interstate trucking. He was elected sheriff of Day County in 1950, serving in that capacity through 1952, and later joined the Federal Bureau of Investigation in 1956, serving there through 1961.

Denholm was admitted to the bar in 1962 under diploma privilege. He returned to Brookings, South Dakota, to start his legal practice. During this time back in Brookings, he also served as a lecturer in economics, law, and political science at South Dakota State University.

== Political career ==
Denholm was a delegate to the South Dakota State Democratic conventions in 1950 and 1952, and later to the Democratic National Convention in 1968.

He was elected as a Democrat to the United States House of Representatives in 1970, serving from January 3, 1971, to January 3, 1975. Denholm was defeated for reelection in 1974 by Republican Larry Pressler. He then returned to the practice of law in Brookings.

== Death ==
Denholm died in Brookings on April 7, 2016, at the age of 92.

U.S. House of Representatives
| Preceded by Ben Reifel | Member of the U.S. House of Representatives from South Dakota's 1st congressional district 1971–1975 | Succeeded by Larry Pressler |
