= South Dakota's 1st congressional district =

Obsolete U.S. House district

Coordinates: 44°40′N 97°20′W

- Obsolete district
- Created: 1910
- Eliminated: 1980
- Years active: 1913–1983

South Dakota's 1st congressional district is an obsolete congressional district that existed from 1913 to 1983.

When South Dakota was admitted into the Union in 1889, it was allocated two congressional seats, both of which were elected state-wide at-large. This continued until South Dakota received a third congressional seat after the 1910 census, and individual districts were established.

From 1913 until 1933, the newly created 1st District covered 21 counties in southeastern South Dakota, including the state's largest city Sioux Falls. When South Dakota's 3rd congressional district was eliminated after the 1930 census, the 1st District was expanded to include all of the counties in South Dakota east of the Missouri River. Population changes eventually reduced the district size until it again covered just 21 counties in the eastern part of the state. During the 97th Congress, it included the cities of Aberdeen, Brookings, Sioux Falls, Watertown, Vermillion, and Yankton.

It was eliminated as a result of the redistricting cycle after the 1980 census.

== List of members representing the district ==
Member (Residence)	Party	Years	Cong ress	Electoral history
District established March 4, 1913
Charles H. Dillon (Yankton)	Republican	March 4, 1913 – March 3, 1919	63rd 64th 65th	Elected in 1912. Re-elected in 1914. Re-elected in 1916. Lost renomination.
Charles A. Christopherson (Sioux Falls)	Republican	March 4, 1919 – March 3, 1933	66th 67th 68th 69th 70th 71st 72nd	Elected in 1918. Re-elected in 1920. Re-elected in 1922. Re-elected in 1924. Re-elected in 1926. Re-elected in 1928. Re-elected in 1930. Lost re-election.
Fred H. Hildebrandt (Watertown)	Democratic	March 4, 1933 – January 3, 1939	73rd 74th 75th	Elected in 1932. Re-elected in 1934. Re-elected in 1936. Retired to run for U.S. senator.
Karl E. Mundt (Madison)	Republican	January 3, 1939 – December 30, 1948	76th 77th 78th 79th 80th	Elected in 1938. Re-elected in 1940. Re-elected in 1942. Re-elected in 1944. Re-elected in 1946. Retired to run for U.S. senator and then resigned when appointed to the seat.
Vacant		December 30, 1948 – January 3, 1949	80th	
Harold Lovre (Watertown)	Republican	January 3, 1949 – January 3, 1957	81st 82nd 83rd 84th	Elected in 1948. Re-elected in 1950. Re-elected in 1952. Re-elected in 1954. Lost re-election.
George McGovern (Mitchell)	Democratic	January 3, 1957 – January 3, 1961	85th 86th	Elected in 1956. Re-elected in 1958. Retired to run for U.S. senator.
Ben Reifel (Aberdeen)	Republican	January 3, 1961 – January 3, 1971	87th 88th 89th 90th 91st	Elected in 1960. Re-elected in 1962. Re-elected in 1964. Re-elected in 1966. Re-elected in 1968. Retired.
Frank E. Denholm (Brookings)	Democratic	January 3, 1971 – January 3, 1975	92nd 93rd	Elected in 1970. Re-elected in 1972. Lost re-election.
Larry Pressler (Humboldt)	Republican	January 3, 1975 – January 3, 1979	94th 95th	Elected in 1974. Re-elected in 1976. Retired to run for U.S. senator.
Tom Daschle (Aberdeen)	Democratic	January 3, 1979 – January 3, 1983	96th 97th	Elected in 1978. Re-elected in 1980. Redistricted to the at-large district.
District dissolved January 3, 1983
