= Tom Berry (South Dakota politician) =

American politician (1879–1951)

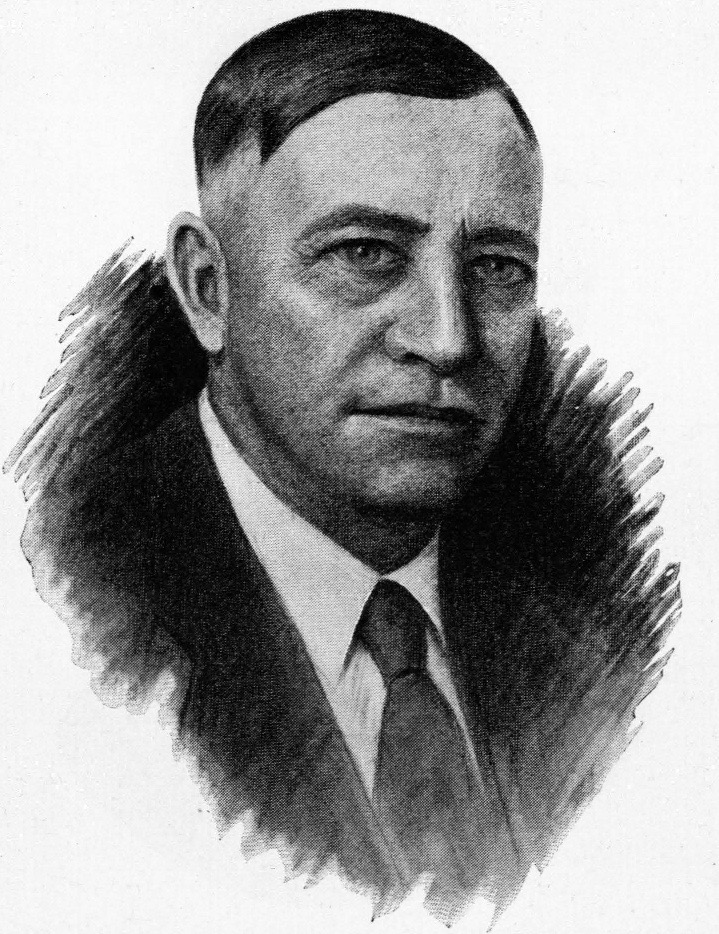

14th Governor of South Dakota
- In office January 3, 1933 – January 5, 1937
- Lieutenant: Hans Ustrud; Robert Peterson
- Preceded by: Warren Green
- Succeeded by: Leslie Jensen

Personal details
- Born: April 23, 1879 Paddock, Holt County, Nebraska, U.S.
- Died: October 30, 1951 (aged 72) Rapid City, South Dakota, U.S.
- Party: Democratic
- Spouse: Lorena McLain
- Children: 4
- Profession: Rancher, Politician

Thomas Matthew Berry (April 23, 1879 – October 30, 1951) was the 14th governor of South Dakota. Berry, a Democrat from Belvidere, South Dakota, served from 1933 to 1937. He is noted for defeating two incumbent Democratic United States senators in the state Democratic primary and then losing the seat to the Republicans in the general election.

== Early life ==
Berry was born in Paddock, Holt County, Nebraska, and attended public school in O'Neill, Nebraska. He was married to Lorena McLain and they had four children.

== Career ==
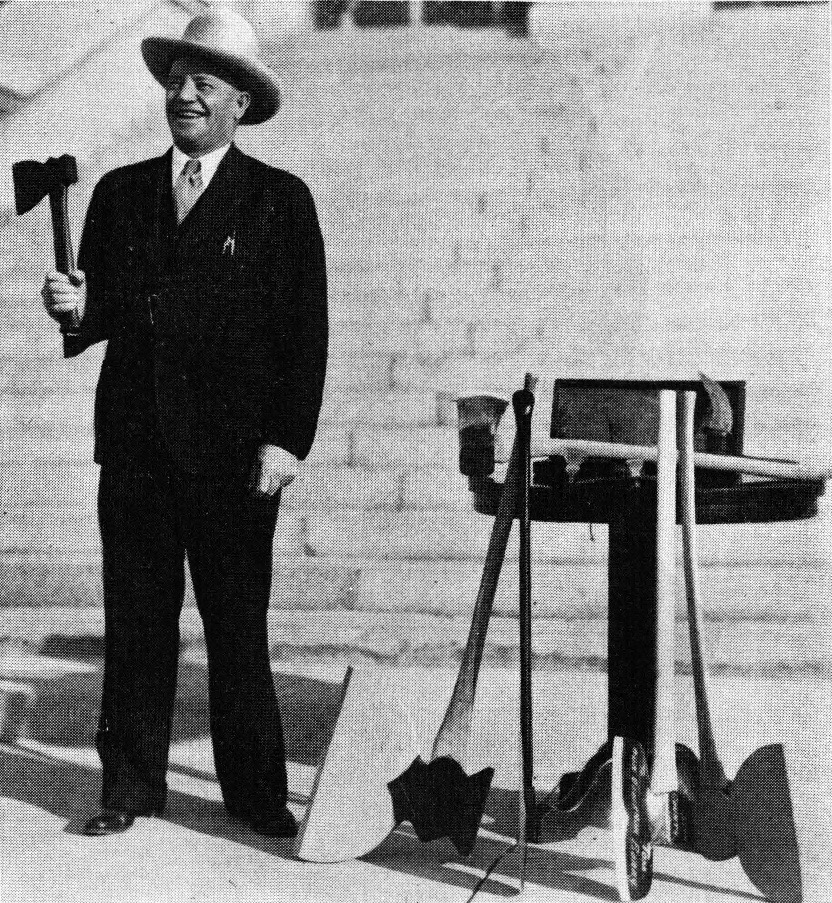
Berry in 1933

Berry moved to South Dakota in 1897. He homesteaded in Gregory County, moved to Todd County, and finally settled in Mellette County south of Belvidere. He built up a 30,000 acre (120 km^{2}) ranch raising Hereford cattle and saddle horses. Berry served in the House of Representatives of the South Dakota Legislature from 1925 to 1931, and was a member of the Custer State Park Board.

Elected governor twice, in 1932 and 1934, Berry assisted in South Dakota's recovery from the Great Depression. As Governor, he acted as Federal Relief Administrator and helped secure federal aid. He called the legislature into special session to legalize 3.2 percent beer and again to enact unemployment insurance. During his tenure, state property tax was abolished, replaced by gross income tax which was replaced by a state sales tax.

Berry ran for a third term in 1936 but was defeated by Leslie Jensen. In 1938, he defeated interim United States Senator Herbert Hitchcock in the Democratic primary, but lost the general election to Chan Gurney. In 1942, Berry defeated incumbent United States Senator William J. Bulow in the Democratic primary but lost the general election to Harlan J. Bushfield. That defeat ended his political career.

From 1942 to 1947 he served as director of the Farm Credit Administration in Omaha, Nebraska. In 1962, he was inducted into Hall of Great Westerners of the National Cowboy & Western Heritage Museum.

== Death ==
He retired to Rapid City, South Dakota, where he lived until his death.

Party political offices
Preceded by D. A. McCullough	Democratic nominee for Governor of South Dakota; 1932, 1934, 1936	Succeeded by Oscar Fosheim
Preceded by C. J. Gunderson	Democratic nominee for U.S. Senator from South Dakota (Class 3); 1938	Succeeded by George M. Bradshaw
Preceded by William J. Bulow	Democratic nominee for U.S. Senator from South Dakota (Class 2); 1942	Succeeded by John A. Engel
Political offices
Preceded by Warren Green	Governor of South Dakota; 1933–1937	Succeeded by Leslie Jensen
