= Robert Peterson (South Dakota politician) =

American politician

Robert D. Peterson (March 14, 1888 – September 2, 1968) was the 20th Lieutenant Governor of South Dakota serving from 1935 to 1937 under Governor Tom Berry. Robert Peterson was from Glenwood Township in Clay County. He was married to Esther Ellenore (Bring) Peterson (1888-1916). Both he and his wife were buried in Komstad Cemetery in Clay County, South Dakota.

Political offices
Preceded by Hans Ustrud	Lieutenant Governor of South Dakota; 1935–1937	Succeeded by Donald McMurchie
