= 1944 United States Senate election in South Dakota =

- November 7, 1944
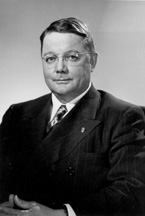

Nominee	Chan Gurney	George M. Bradshaw
Party	Republican	Democratic
Popular vote	145,248	82,199
Percentage	63.86%	36.14%
- County results Gurney: 50–60% 60–70% 70–80% 80–90% Bradshaw: 50–60% 70–80%
U.S. senator before election
Chan Gurney
Republican
Elected U.S. Senator
Chan Gurney
Republican

The 1944 United States Senate election in South Dakota took place on November 7, 1944. Incumbent Republican Senator Chan Gurney ran for re-election to a second term. He faced a strong challenge in the Republican primary from Lieutenant Governor A. C. Miller, who claimed that Gurney was too friendly to New Deal policies, but was defeated by Gurney by a wide margin. In the general election, Gurney faced former State Senator George M. Bradshaw, whom he defeated in a landslide as Thomas E. Dewey was decisively winning the state over President Franklin D. Roosevelt in the presidential election.

== Democratic primary ==
Former State Senator George M. Bradshaw was the only Democratic candidate to file for the U.S. Senate, removing the race from the ballot.

== Republican primary ==
=== Candidates ===
- Chan Gurney, incumbent U.S. Senator
- A. C. Miller, Lieutenant Governor of South Dakota

=== Results ===
Republican primary
Party	Candidate	Votes	%
Republican	Chan Gurney (inc.)	35,960	56.18%
Republican	A. C. Miller	28,052	43.82%
Total votes		64,012	100.00%

== General election ==
=== Results ===
1944 United States Senate election in South Dakota
Party	Candidate	Votes	%	±%
Republican	Chan Gurney (inc.)	145,248	63.86%	+5.80%
Democratic	George M. Bradshaw	82,199	36.14%	−5.80%
Majority		63,049	27.72%	+11.60%
Turnout		227,447		
Republican hold				
