= Fred H. Hildebrandt =

American politician (1874-1956)

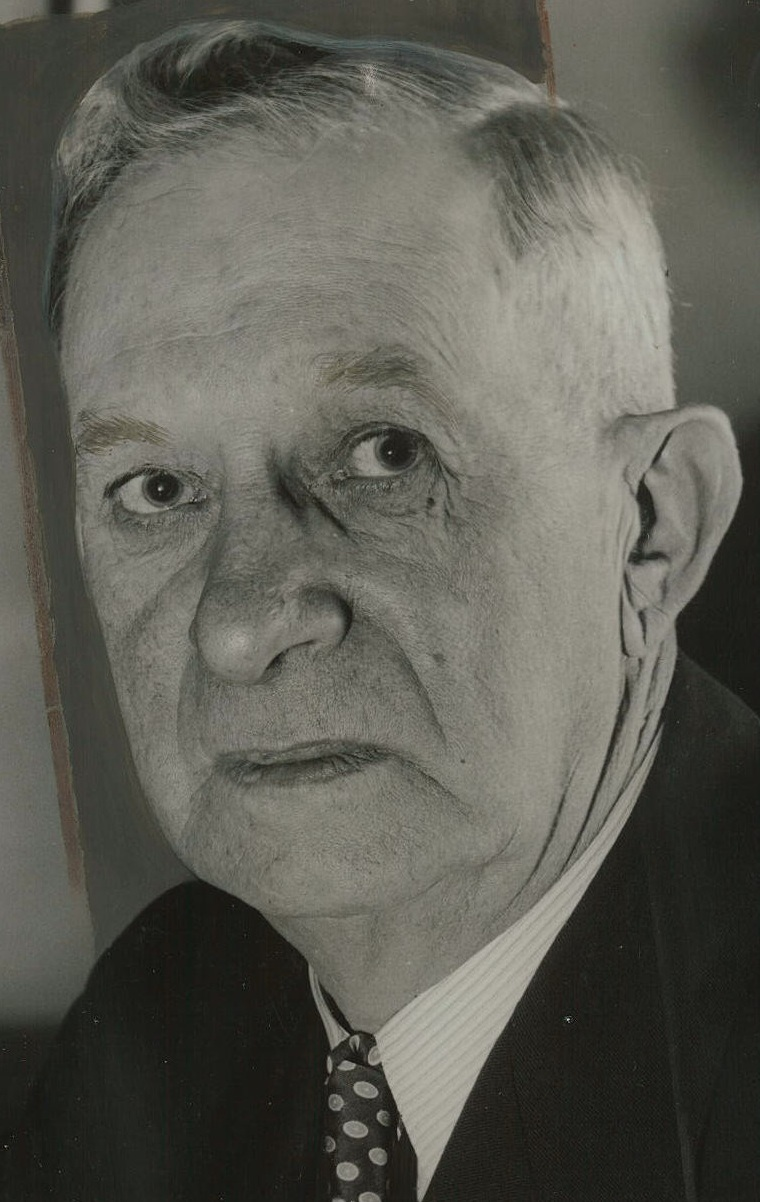

Member of the U.S. House of Representatives from South Dakota's at-large district
- In office March 4, 1933 – January 3, 1939
- Preceded by: Charles A. Christopherson
- Succeeded by: Karl E. Mundt

Member of the South Dakota House of Representatives
- In office 1922–1923

Personal details
- Born: Fred Herman Hildebrandt; August 2, 1874 West Bend, Wisconsin, U.S.
- Died: January 26, 1956 (aged 81) Bradenton, Florida, U.S.
- Resting place: Mount Hope Cemetery
- Party: Democratic

Fred Herman Hildebrandt (August 2, 1874 – January 26, 1956) was a member of the United States House of Representatives from South Dakota, serving three consecutive terms. He worked for the railroad for nearly three decades and was appointed as head of the South Dakota Game and Fish Commission, serving from 1927 to 1931.

== Early life and education ==
Hildebrandt was born in West Bend, Wisconsin in 1874. He moved with his parents to Waupun, Wisconsin, where he attended the public and high schools.

== Career ==
He later moved to Watertown, South Dakota in 1900. He started working for the Chicago and North Western Railway and made that his career, from 1903 to 1932.

== Political career ==
He was elected to the South Dakota House of Representatives, serving from 1922 to 1923. He was appointed as head of the South Dakota Game and Fish Commission, serving from 1927 to 1931.

=== Congress ===
In 1932, Hildebrandt was elected as a Democrat to the United States House of Representatives; he was elected to two more terms, serving through 1938. In 1938, he ran unsuccessfully for the position of United States Senator, but lost to former Governor Tom Berry in the Democratic primary.

== Death and burial ==
After his defeat, Hildebrandt retired from public life and resided in Watertown. He died in Bradenton, Florida in 1956, and was buried at Mount Hope Cemetery, Watertown.

== Sources ==
- United States Congress. "Fred H. Hildebrandt (id: H000584)". Biographical Directory of the United States Congress.

U.S. House of Representatives
Preceded by Charles A. Christopherson	Member of the U.S. House of Representatives from South Dakota's 1st congressional district 1933–1939	Succeeded by Karl E. Mundt
