= Herbert E. Hitchcock =

American politician

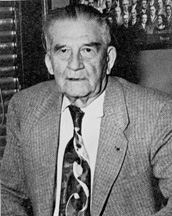

United States Senator from South Dakota
- In office December 29, 1936 – November 8, 1938
- Appointed by: Tom Berry
- Preceded by: Peter Norbeck
- Succeeded by: Gladys Pyle

Personal details
- Born: Herbert Emery Hitchcock; August 22, 1867 Maquoketa, Iowa, U.S.
- Died: February 17, 1958 (aged 90) Mitchell, South Dakota, U.S.
- Party: Democratic
- Parents: Milando Lansing Hitchcock (father); Harriet M. Lumley (mother)
- Education: University of Chicago Law School

Herbert Emery Hitchcock (August 22, 1867 – February 17, 1958) was a United States senator from South Dakota.

== Life ==
Hitchcock was born in Maquoketa, Iowa, the son of Harriet M. Lumley and Milando Lansing Hitchcock. He attended public schools in Iowa and San Jose, California, a business college at Davenport, Iowa, Iowa State College at Ames, and the University of Chicago Law School.

He moved to Mitchell, South Dakota, in 1884, where he attended school and worked as a stenographer; he was admitted to the South Dakota bar in 1896 and commenced practice in Mitchell. He also engaged in banking, and was clerk of the South Dakota State Senate in 1896. He was elected as a State's attorney in 1904 and 1906, and was elected to the State Senate in 1909, 1911, and 1929. Hitchcock was a trustee of Yankton College in 1936 and was president of Mitchell school board from 1924 to 1934.

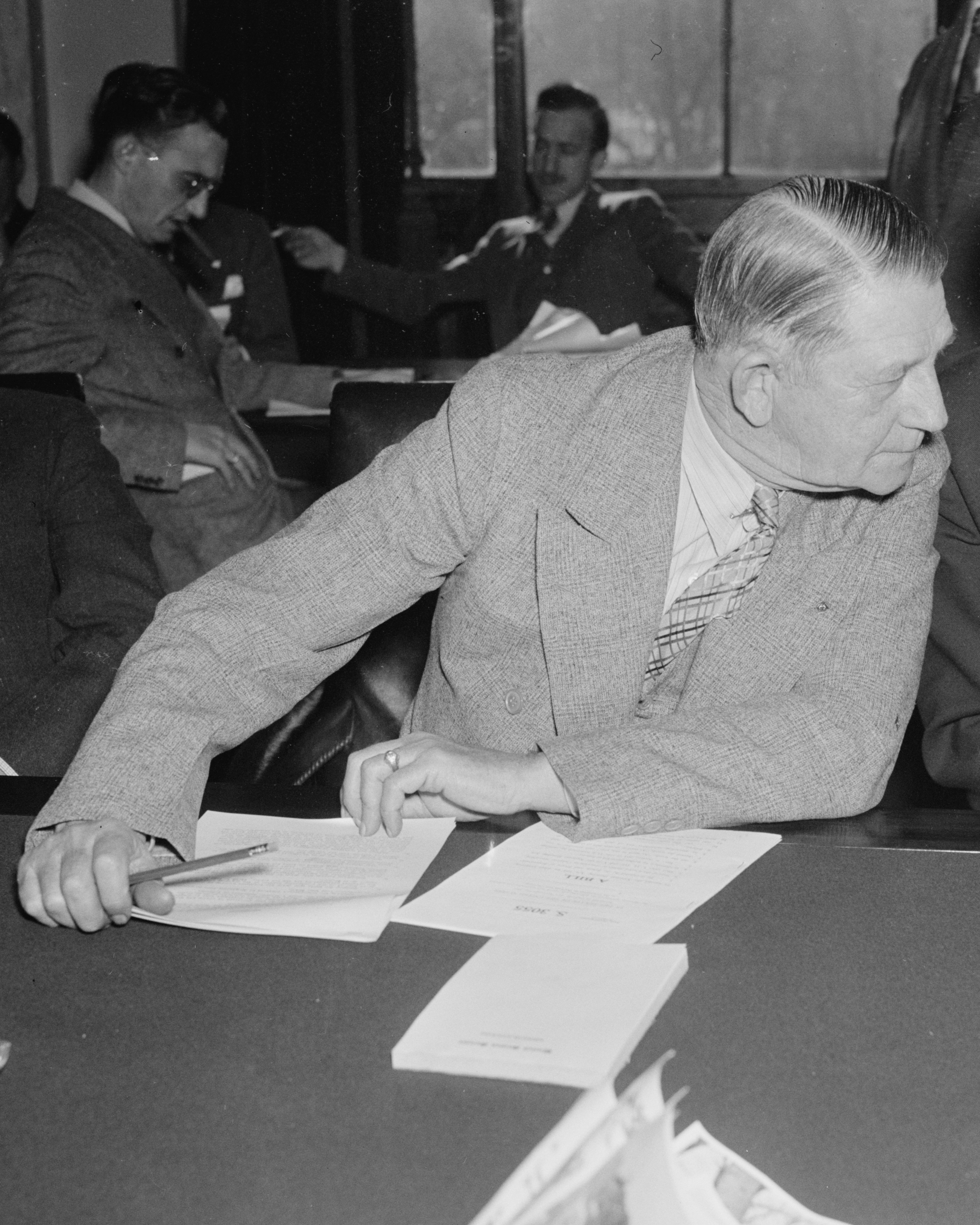
Senator Herbert E. Hitchcock in Washington, D.C., on December 1, 1937.

During the 1932 Democratic National Convention he was a delegate and one of fifty five people who wrote the party's national platform and from 1932 to 1936 he served as the chairman of the South Dakota Democratic Party. On December 29, 1936, Hitchcock was appointed to the United States Senate as a Democrat to fill the vacancy caused by the death of Peter Norbeck. He served until January 3, 1939. He campaigned in 1938 as the incumbent for the Democratic nomination to fill the seat for a full term, but was defeated by former Governor Tom Berry in the primary election who went on to be defeated by Republican Chan Gurney in the general election. In 1940 he was selected as one of South Dakota's Democratic presidential electors, but the state was won by Republican Wendell Willkie.

He resumed the practice of law until his death in Mitchell, South Dakota, on February 17, 1958, and was interred at Graceland Cemetery. In his will he left $112,000 various institutions including colleges and charities.

U.S. Senate
Preceded by Peter Norbeck	U.S. senator (Class 3) from South Dakota; 1936–1938; Served alongside: William J. Bulow	Succeeded by Gladys Pyle
