= 1984 United States Senate election in South Dakota =

- November 6, 1984
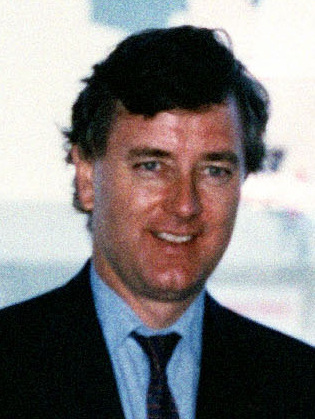

Nominee	Larry Pressler	George V. Cunningham
Party	Republican	Democratic
Popular vote	235,176	80,537
Percentage	74.49%	25.51%
- County results Pressler: 50–60% 60–70% 70–80% 80–90% >90% Cunningham: 50–60%
U.S. senator before election
Larry Pressler
Republican
Elected U.S. Senator
Larry Pressler
Republican

The 1984 United States Senate election in South Dakota was held on November 6, 1984. Incumbent Republican Senator Larry Pressler was easily re-elected to a second term after famously declining to take bribes during the Abscam Scandal.

== Democratic primary ==
=== Candidates ===
- George V. Cunningham, former aide to Sen. George McGovern
- Dean L. Sinclair

=== Results ===
1984 Democratic U.S. Senate primary
Party	Candidate	Votes	%
Democratic	George V. Cunningham	31,376	68.14%
Democratic	Dean L. Sinclair	14,672	31.86%
Total votes		46,048	100.00%

== General election ==
=== Results ===
General election results
Party	Candidate	Votes	%	±%
Republican	Larry Pressler (incumbent)	235,176	74.49%	▲7.65
Democratic	George V. Cunningham	80,537	25.51%	▼7.65
Total votes		315,713	100.00%	
Republican hold				

== See also ==
- 1984 United States Senate elections
