= Pyle House (Huron, South Dakota) =

- U.S. National Register of Historic Places
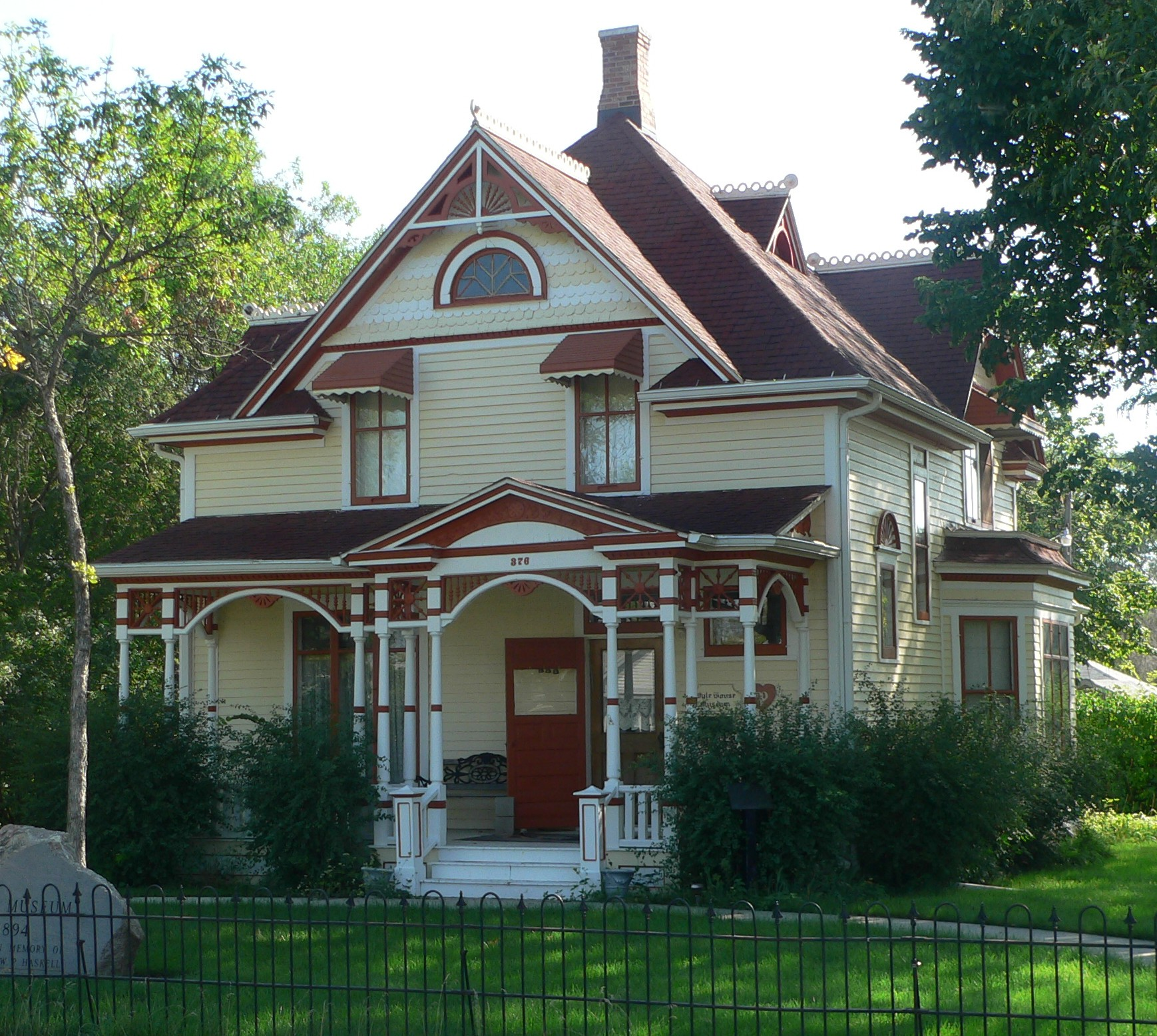

- Location within South Dakota Location within the United States
- Location: 376 Idaho Ave., S.E., Huron, South Dakota
- Coordinates: 44°21′44″N 98°12′32″W
- Area: 0.5 acres (0.20 ha)
- Built: 1894
- NRHP reference No.: 74002288
- Added to NRHP: December 30, 1974

The Pyle House, which has also been known as The Pyle Home, at 376 Idaho Ave., S.E. in Huron, South Dakota, was built in 1894. It has served as a house museum and was listed on the National Register of Historic Places in 1974.

It is a one-and-a-half-story late Queen Anne-style house, built upon a cut stone foundation. On a corner lot, it is surrounded by a wrought iron fence added in about 1900.

In 1973, it was deemed to be "one of the finest residential structures in Huron" and among "the best preserved nineteenth century dwellings in the state." It was then still the home of Pyle family descendants of the original owner, John L. Pyle.
