= 1934 South Dakota gubernatorial election =

- November 6, 1934
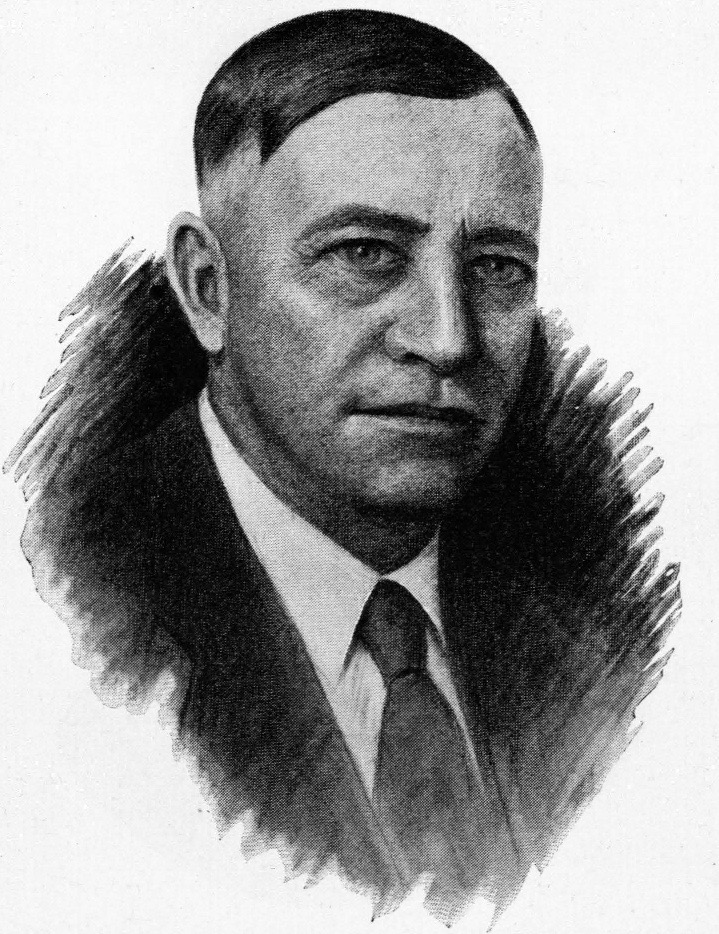

| Nominee | Tom Berry | William C. Allen |
| Party | Democratic | Republican |
| Popular vote | 172,228 | 119,477 |
| Percentage | 58.60% | 40.65% |
- County results Berry: 50–60% 60–70% 70–80% Allen: 50–60%
Governor of South Dakota before election
Tom Berry
Democratic
Elected Governor of South Dakota
Tom Berry
Democratic

The 1934 South Dakota gubernatorial election was held on November 6, 1934. Incumbent Democratic Governor Tom Berry ran for re-election to a second term. After defeating an intra-party challenge from Lieutenant Governor Hans Ustrud, Berry faced magazine publisher William C. Allen, who won a crowded Republican primary with a large plurality. Aided by the national environment favoring Democrats, Berry won re-election in a landslide.

== Democratic primary ==
=== Candidates ===
- Tom Berry, incumbent Governor
- Hans Ustrud, Lieutenant Governor of South Dakota

=== Results ===
Democratic primary
| Party | Candidate | Votes | % |
|---|---|---|---|
| Democratic | Tom Berry (inc.) | 61,484 | 79.31% |
| Democratic | Hans Ustrud | 16,037 | 20.69% |
| Total votes | | 77,521 | 100.00% |

== Republican primary ==
=== Candidates ===
- William C. Allen, publisher of the Dakota Farmer
- Otto Kaas, State Senator from Marshall County
- Daniel K. Loucks, former Speaker of the South Dakota House of Representatives
- Charles A. Alseth, State Representative from Kingsbury County

=== Results ===
Republican primary
| Party | Candidate | Votes | % |
|---|---|---|---|
| Republican | William C. Allen | 46,654 | 47.94% |
| Republican | Otto Kaas | 19,113 | 19.64% |
| Republican | Daniel K. Loucks | 17,846 | 18.34% |
| Republican | Charles A. Alseth | 13,702 | 14.08% |
| Total votes | | 97,315 | 100.00% |

== General election ==
=== Results ===
1934 South Dakota gubernatorial election
| Party | Candidate | Votes | % | ±% |
|---|---|---|---|---|
| Democratic | Tom Berry (inc.) | 172,228 | 58.60% | +2.97% |
| Republican | William C. Allen | 119,477 | 40.65% | −1.75% |
| Independent | Knute Walstad | 2,190 | 0.75% | — |
| Majority | | 52,751 | 17.95% | +4.72% |
| Turnout | | 293,895 | 100.00% | |
| Democratic hold | | | | |
