= 1936 United States Senate election in South Dakota =

- November 3, 1936
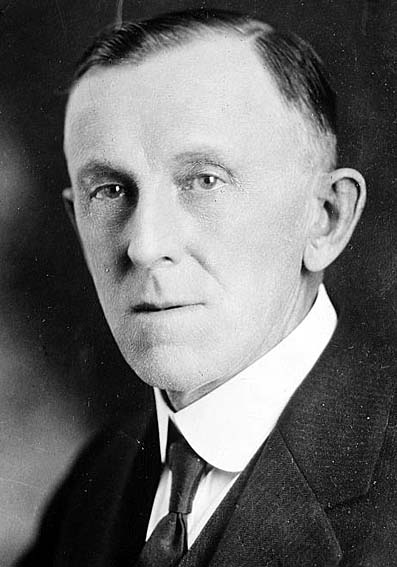

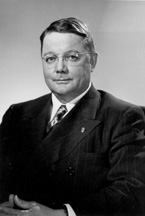
Nominee	William J. Bulow	Chan Gurney
Party	Democratic	Republican
Popular vote	141,509	135,461
Percentage	48.83%	46.75%
- County results Bulow: 40–50% 50–60% 60–70% Gurney: 40–50% 50–60% 60–70% No Vote
U.S. senator before election
William J. Bulow
Democratic
Elected U.S. Senator
William J. Bulow
Democratic

The 1936 United States Senate election in South Dakota took place on November 3, 1936. Incumbent Democratic Senator William J. Bulow ran for re-election to a second term. He was challenged by businessman Chan Gurney, who defeated former Congressman Charles A. Christopherson in the Republican primary. Bulow, likely aided by President Franklin D. Roosevelt's landslide victory in South Dakota, narrowly defeated Gurney to win his second term, though he significantly underperformed Roosevelt.

== Democratic primary ==
Senator Bulow was the only Democratic candidate to file for the Senate; accordingly, no election occurred and the race did not appear on the primary election ballot.

== Republican primary ==
=== Candidates ===
- Chan Gurney, businessman
- Charles A. Christopherson, former U.S. Congressman from South Dakota's 1st congressional district

=== Results ===
Republican primary
Party	Candidate	Votes	%
Republican	Chan Gurney	61,528	64.60%
Republican	C. A. Christopherson	33,720	35.40%
Total votes		95,248	100.00%

== General election ==
=== Results ===
1936 United States Senate election in South Dakota
Party	Candidate	Votes	%	±%
Democratic	William J. Bulow (inc.)	141,509	48.83%	−2.80%
Republican	Chan Gurney	135,461	46.75%	−1.62%
Independent	Arthur Bennett	12,816	4.42%	—
Majority		6,048	2.09%	−1.18%
Turnout		289,786	100.00%	
Democratic hold				
