= 1978 United States Senate election in South Dakota =

- November 7, 1978
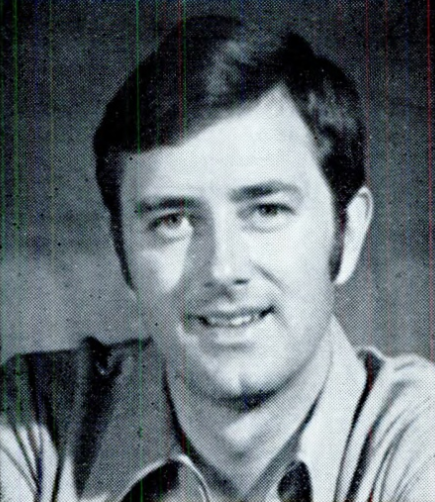

Nominee	Larry Pressler	Don Barnett
Party	Republican	Democratic
Popular vote	170,832	84,767
Percentage	66.84%	33.16%
- County results Pressler: 50–60% 60–70% 70–80% 80–90% Barnett: 50–60% 60–70% 70–80%
U.S. senator before election
James Abourezk
Democratic
Elected U.S. Senator
Larry Pressler
Republican

The 1978 United States Senate election in South Dakota was held on November 7, 1978. Incumbent Democratic U.S. Senator James Abourezk did not run for re-election to a second term, and was succeeded by his political rival, Republican U.S. Representative Larry Pressler.

== Democratic primary ==
=== Candidates ===
- Don Barnett, former Mayor of Rapid City
- Kenneth D. Stofferahn, farmer and former Republican State Representative from Humboldt

=== Results ===
1978 Democratic Senate primary
Party	Candidate	Votes	%
Democratic	Don Barnett	37,319	55.12%
Democratic	Kenneth D. Stofferahn	30,384	44.88%
Total votes		67,703	100.00%

== Republican primary ==
=== Candidates ===
- Larry Pressler, U.S. Representative from Humboldt
- Ron Williamson, businessman from Sioux Falls

=== Results ===
1978 Republican primary results
Party	Candidate	Votes	%
Republican	Larry Pressler	66,893	73.88%
Republican	Ron Williamson	23,646	26.12%
Total votes		90,539	100.00%

== General election ==
=== Results ===
1978 U.S. Senate election results
Party	Candidate	Votes	%
Republican	Larry Pressler	170,832	66.84%
Democratic	Don Barnett	84,767	33.16%
Total votes		255,599	100.00%
Republican gain from Democratic			

== See also ==
- 1978 United States Senate elections
