= Chan Gurney =

American businessman and politician

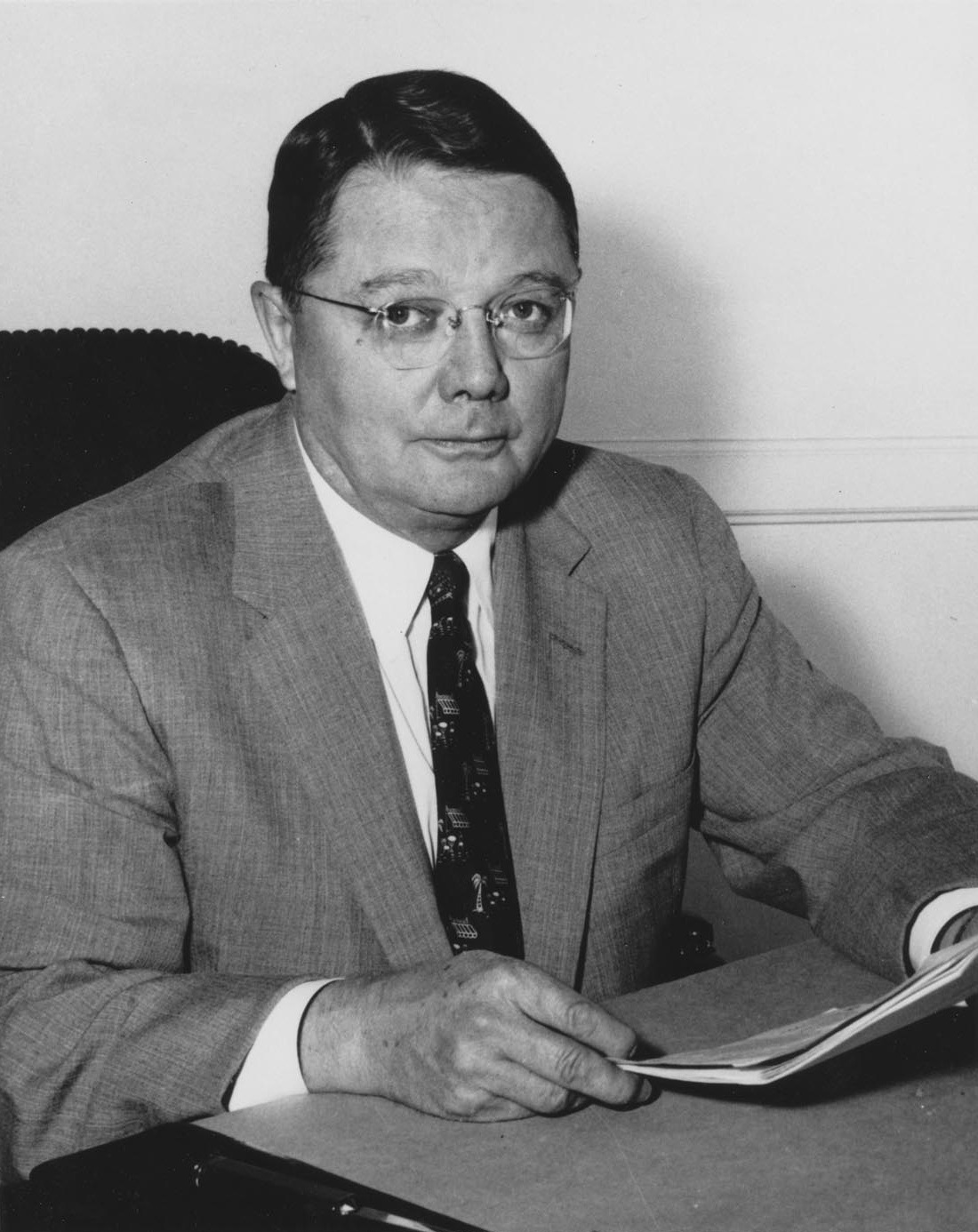
- Official portrait, c. 1947

Chair of the Senate Armed Services Committee
- In office January 3, 1947 – January 3, 1949
- Preceded by: Position established
- Succeeded by: Millard Tydings

Secretary of the Senate Republican Conference
- In office September 30, 1945 – January 3, 1946
- Leader: Wallace H. White Jr.
- Preceded by: Harold Hitz Burton
- Succeeded by: Milton Young

United States Senator from South Dakota
- In office January 3, 1939 – January 3, 1951
- Preceded by: Gladys Pyle
- Succeeded by: Francis Case

Personal details
- Born: May 21, 1896 Yankton, South Dakota, U.S.
- Died: March 9, 1985 (aged 88) Yankton, South Dakota, U.S.
- Resting place: Yankton Cemetery, Yankton, SD
- Party: Republican
- Spouse: Evelyn Bordeno (m. 1917-1985, his death)
- Children: 3
- Occupation: Businessman

Military service
- Allegiance: United States of America
- Branch/service: United States Army
- Years of service: 1917-1919
- Rank: Sergeant
- Unit: Company A, 34th Engineer Regiment
- Battles/wars: World War I

John Chandler "Chan" Gurney (May 21, 1896 – March 9, 1985) was an American businessman and politician from South Dakota. A Republican, he was most notable for his service as a U.S. senator from 1939 to 1951.

== Early life ==
Gurney was born in Yankton, South Dakota, on May 21, 1896, a son of Deloss Butler Gurney and Henrietta (Klopping) Gurney. He attended the public schools of Yankton and graduated from Yankton High School in 1915. He became active in his father's business, Gurney's Seed and Nursery Company, of which was appointed secretary and treasurer.

== Military service ==
During World War I, Gurney volunteered for military service, though he was ineligible for the draft because he was married. Assigned to the United States Army's Company A, 34th Engineer Regiment, he completed training at Camp Lewis, Washington. He served in France in 1918 and 1919 and attained the rank of sergeant before being discharged for illness.

== Continued career ==
After returning to the United States, Gurney resumed working for the family seed business, where he remained until 1926. A pioneer in commercial radio advertising, Gurney became the owner and operator of Yankton's (WNAX) in 1926. In 1933, he moved to Sioux Falls, South Dakota, where he became active in the wholesale gasoline and oil business and was a developer of gasohol.

Gurney was a member of the Sons of the American Revolution. He also belonged to the American Legion and Veterans of Foreign Wars. In addition, Gurney was a member of the Masons and Elks.

== U.S. Senator ==
In 1936, ran unsuccessfully for election to the United States Senate as a Republican, losing narrowly to incumbent Senator William J. Bulow. In 1938, he was the successful Republican nominee. Gurney was considered a moderate critic of Franklin Roosevelt, however, he consistently voted in favor of measures which would help the United Kingdom in their war against Nazi Germany. To this end Gurney voted to confirm Henry Stimson as Secretary of War and to confirm Frank Knox as Secretary of the Navy, both of which were opposed by the isolationist block in the Senate on the grounds that Stimson and Knox were too "pro-British." When Burton K. Wheeler, Gerald Nye, Henrik Shipstead and David Ignatius Walsh all opposed voting to extend the selective service act in defiance of Franklin Roosevelt, Gurney sided with the administration and voted in favor of extending it. In March 1941 the Senate voted in favor a bill to "provide military aid to any nation whose defense was deemed vital to the United States." The British Royal Navy was combatting Hitler's Kriegsmarine in the Battle of the Atlantic and all other allied nations had surrendered to the Nazis by this time, therefore in practice the bill was essentially just a bill to fund and arm the British Royal Navy. Gurney voted in favor of the bill. The isolationist press condemned him for this but he said he was "unmoved by the blatherings of Hitlerites." Similarly, Gurney voted in favor of additional Lend Lease appropriations to provide material aid (primarily munitions and food) to the British military in October 1941. Opinion polling showed that in June 1941 most people in the South Dakota cities of Sioux Falls, Rapid City, Aberdeen, Brookings, Sturgis, Hill City, Watertown, Keystone, Spearfish, Deadwood, Mitchell, Yankton, Pierre and Custer were in favor of providing military aid and support to the United Kingdom. When people in the aforementioned fourteen South Dakota towns and cities were asked "Should we (the United States) do everything in our power to help Great Britain during the current war?" over half of respondents in the aforementioned towns said yes. In response to this, Gurney said that these surveys and opinion polls proved that he was more in touch with his constituents than Gerald Nye of North Dakota was with his own constituents (Nye was outspokenly opposed to helping Great Britain, even though most people in the western half of his state were in favor of aiding the British. In this respects, Nye was considered far more isolationist than his actual constituents.) Most Sioux people in South Dakota at the time expressed opinions which were "pro-British" and "sympathetic to interventionism." In early 1941 there was a vote to increase funding for the United States army and navy, as the United States was not at war at the time the isolationist members of the Senate, including Burton K. Wheeler, Gerald Nye, Henrik Shipstead and David Ignatius Walsh all opposed the measure. Gurney voted in favor of it and said "One would have to be a fool to oppose" the bill. He was chairman of the U.S. Senate Committee on Armed Services in the 80th Congress (1947-1949), the first chairman after the merger of the committees on Naval Affairs and Military Affairs. Gurney was reelected in 1944, and served from January 3, 1939, to January 3, 1951. Gurney was an unsuccessful candidate for renomination in 1950, losing the Republican primary to Francis Case, who went on to win the general election.

== Civil Aeronautics Board ==
In 1951, Gurney was appointed to the Civil Aeronautics Board. He served as chairman from 1954 to 1957, and served on the board until 1964.

== Retirement and death ==
In retirement, Gurney retired to Yankton. He died there on March 9, 1985. Gurney was buried at Yankton Cemetery in Yankton.

== Legacy ==
Chan Gurney Municipal Airport in Yankton is named for Gurney.

== Family ==
In 1917, Gurney married Evelyn Bordeno (1897-1993) in Kansas City, Kansas. They were the parents of three children - Ida, John, and Deloss.

== Additional reading ==
- Pressler, Larry. "John Chandler Gurney." In U.S. Senators from the Prairie, pp. 114–23. Vermillion, SD: Dakota Press, 1982. Via Google Books.

Party political offices
Preceded by William H. McMaster	Republican nominee for U.S. Senator from South Dakota (Class 2); 1936	Succeeded by Harlan J. Bushfield
Preceded by Gladys Pyle	Republican nominee for U.S. Senator from South Dakota (Class 3); 1938, 1944	Succeeded by Francis H. Case
Preceded by Harold Hitz Burton	Secretary of the Senate Republican Conference; 1945–1946	Succeeded by Milton Young
U.S. Senate
Preceded by Gladys Pyle	U.S. Senator (Class 3) from South Dakota; 1939–1951; Served alongside: William J. Bulow, Harlan J. Bushfield, Vera C. Bushfield, Karl E. Mundt	Succeeded by Francis H. Case
Preceded by None (position created)	Chair of the Senate Armed Services Committee; 1947–1949	Succeeded by Millard Tydings
