= List of governors of South Dakota =

The governor of South Dakota is the head of government of the U.S. state of South Dakota. The current governor is Larry Rhoden, representing the Republican Party, serving since 2025.

== Governors ==
Dakota Territory was organized on March 2, 1861; on November 2, 1889, it was split into the states of North Dakota and South Dakota.

The Constitution of South Dakota originally provided for the election of a governor and lieutenant governor every two years with no limits. A law passed in 1947 prohibited parties from nominating someone who had served two consecutive terms, effectively creating a term limit, and an amendment in 1972 increased term lengths to four years while formally prohibiting someone from serving three consecutive terms. Should the office of governor become vacant, the lieutenant governor becomes governor.

The Republican Party has been in control of the governorship continuously since 1979, Democrats last won the governorship of South Dakota in 1974. This is the longest drought of any state where the opposite party last held the office.

Governors of the State of South Dakota
No.	Governor	Term in office	Party	Election	Lt. Governor (Note: Lieutenant governors represented the same party as their governor unless noted.)
1	Arthur C. Mellette (1842–1896)	November 2, 1889 (Note: Mellette was territorial governor when South Dakota became a state, and was elected as its first governor. He was sworn in on October 15, 1889.) – January 3, 1893 (1159 days; retired)	Republican	1889	James H. Fletcher
1	Arthur C. Mellette (1842–1896)	November 2, 1889 – January 3, 1893 (1159 days; retired)	Republican	1890	George H. Hoffman
2	Charles H. Sheldon (1840–1898)	January 3, 1893 – January 5, 1897 (1464 days; retired)	Republican	1892	Charles N. Herreid
2	Charles H. Sheldon (1840–1898)	January 3, 1893 – January 5, 1897 (1464 days; retired)	Republican	1894	Charles N. Herreid
3	Andrew E. Lee (1847–1934)	January 5, 1897 – January 8, 1901 (1464 days; retired) (Note: Lee instead ran unsuccessfully for the United States House of Representatives.)	Populist	1896	Daniel T. Hindman (Note: Represented the Republican Party)
3	Andrew E. Lee (1847–1934)	January 5, 1897 – January 8, 1901 (1464 days; retired)	Populist	1898	John T. Kean
4	Charles N. Herreid (1857–1928)	January 8, 1901 – January 3, 1905 (1457 days; retired)	Republican	1900	George W. Snow
4	Charles N. Herreid (1857–1928)	January 8, 1901 – January 3, 1905 (1457 days; retired)	Republican	1902	George W. Snow
5	Samuel H. Elrod (1856–1935)	January 3, 1905 – January 8, 1907 (736 days; lost nomination)	Republican	1904	John E. McDougall
6	Coe I. Crawford (1858–1944)	January 8, 1907 – January 5, 1909 (729 days; retired) (Note: Crawford was instead elected to the United States Senate.)	Republican	1906	Howard C. Shober
7	Robert S. Vessey (1858–1929)	January 5, 1909 – January 7, 1913 (1464 days; retired)	Republican	1908	Howard C. Shober
7	Robert S. Vessey (1858–1929)	January 5, 1909 – January 7, 1913 (1464 days; retired)	Republican	1910	Frank M. Byrne
8	Frank M. Byrne (1858–1927)	January 7, 1913 – January 2, 1917 (1457 days; retired)	Republican	1912	Edward Lincoln Abel
8	Frank M. Byrne (1858–1927)	January 7, 1913 – January 2, 1917 (1457 days; retired)	Republican	1914	Peter Norbeck
9	Peter Norbeck (1870–1936)	January 2, 1917 – January 4, 1921 (1464 days; retired) (Note: Norbeck was instead elected to the United States Senate.)	Republican	1916	William H. McMaster
9	Peter Norbeck (1870–1936)	January 2, 1917 – January 4, 1921 (1464 days; retired)	Republican	1918	William H. McMaster
10	William H. McMaster (1877–1968)	January 4, 1921 – January 6, 1925 (1464 days; retired) (Note: McMaster was instead elected to the United States Senate.)	Republican	1920	Carl Gunderson
10	William H. McMaster (1877–1968)	January 4, 1921 – January 6, 1925 (1464 days; retired)	Republican	1922	Carl Gunderson
11	Carl Gunderson (1864–1933)	January 6, 1925 – January 3, 1927 (728 days; lost election)	Republican	1924	Alva Clark Forney
12	William J. Bulow (1869–1960)	January 3, 1927 – January 6, 1931 (1465 days; retired) (Note: Bulow was instead elected to the United States Senate.)	Democratic	1926	Hyatt E. Covey
12	William J. Bulow (1869–1960)	January 3, 1927 – January 6, 1931 (1465 days; retired)	Democratic	1928	Clarence E. Coyne (died May 27, 1929)
12	William J. Bulow (1869–1960)	January 3, 1927 – January 6, 1931 (1465 days; retired)	Democratic	1928	John T. Grigsby
13	Warren Green (1869–1945)	January 6, 1931 – January 3, 1933 (729 days; lost election)	Republican	1930	Odell K. Whitney
14	Tom Berry (1879–1951)	January 3, 1933 – January 5, 1937 (1464 days; lost election)	Democratic	1932	Hans Ustrud
14	Tom Berry (1879–1951)	January 3, 1933 – January 5, 1937 (1464 days; lost election)	Democratic	1934	Robert Peterson
15	Leslie Jensen (1892–1964)	January 5, 1937 – January 3, 1939 (729 days; retired) (Note: Jensen instead ran unsuccessfully for the Republican nomination to the United States Senate.)	Republican	1936	Donald McMurchie
16	Harlan J. Bushfield (1882–1948)	January 3, 1939 – January 5, 1943 (1464 days; retired) (Note: Bushfield was instead elected to the United States Senate.)	Republican	1938	Donald McMurchie
16	Harlan J. Bushfield (1882–1948)	January 3, 1939 – January 5, 1943 (1464 days; retired)	Republican	1940	A. C. Miller
17	Merrell Q. Sharpe (1888–1962)	January 5, 1943 – January 7, 1947 (1464 days; lost nomination)	Republican	1942	A. C. Miller
17	Merrell Q. Sharpe (1888–1962)	January 5, 1943 – January 7, 1947 (1464 days; lost nomination)	Republican	1944	Sioux K. Grigsby
18	George T. Mickelson (1903–1965)	January 7, 1947 – January 2, 1951 (1457 days; term-limited) (Note: Under a 1947 law, parties were prohibited from nominating someone who had served two consecutive terms as governor.)	Republican	1946	Sioux K. Grigsby
18	George T. Mickelson (1903–1965)	January 7, 1947 – January 2, 1951 (1457 days; term-limited)	Republican	1948	Rex Terry
19	Sigurd Anderson (1904–1990)	January 2, 1951 – January 4, 1955 (1464 days; term-limited)	Republican	1950	Rex Terry
19	Sigurd Anderson (1904–1990)	January 2, 1951 – January 4, 1955 (1464 days; term-limited)	Republican	1952	Rex Terry
20	Joe Foss (1915–2003)	January 4, 1955 – January 6, 1959 (1464 days; term-limited) (Note: Foss, being term-limited, had already lost election to the United States House of Representatives when his term ended.)	Republican	1954	L. Roy Houck
20	Joe Foss (1915–2003)	January 4, 1955 – January 6, 1959 (1464 days; term-limited)	Republican	1956	L. Roy Houck
21	Ralph Herseth (1909–1969)	January 6, 1959 – January 3, 1961 (729 days; lost election)	Democratic	1958	John F. Lindley
22	Archie M. Gubbrud (1910–1987)	January 3, 1961 – January 5, 1965 (1464 days; term-limited)	Republican	1960	Joe Bottum
22	Archie M. Gubbrud (1910–1987)	January 3, 1961 – January 5, 1965 (1464 days; term-limited)	Republican	1962	Nils Boe
23	Nils Boe (1913–1992)	January 5, 1965 – January 7, 1969 (1464 days; term-limited)	Republican	1964	Lem Overpeck
23	Nils Boe (1913–1992)	January 5, 1965 – January 7, 1969 (1464 days; term-limited)	Republican	1966	Lem Overpeck
24	Frank Farrar (1929–2021)	January 7, 1969 – January 5, 1971 (729 days; lost election)	Republican	1968	James Abdnor
25	Richard F. Kneip (1933–1987)	January 5, 1971 – July 24, 1978 (2758 days; resigned) (Note: Kneip resigned, having been confirmed as United States Ambassador to Singapore.)	Democratic	1970	William Dougherty
25	Richard F. Kneip (1933–1987)	January 5, 1971 – July 24, 1978 (2758 days; resigned)	Democratic	1972	William Dougherty
25	Richard F. Kneip (1933–1987)	January 5, 1971 – July 24, 1978 (2758 days; resigned)	Democratic	1974	Harvey Wollman
26	Harvey Wollman (1935–2022)	July 24, 1978 – January 1, 1979 (162 days; lost nomination) (Note: Wollman lost the Democratic nomination to Roger D. McKellips.)	Democratic	Succeeded from lieutenant governor	Vacant
27	Bill Janklow (1939–2012)	January 1, 1979 – January 10, 1987 (2932 days; term-limited) (Note: Janklow, being term-limited, (Note: Under a 1972 amendment to the constitution, governors are ineligible to be elected to more than two consecutive terms.) had already lost the Republican nomination for the United States Senate when his term ended.)	Republican	1978	Lowell C. Hansen II
27	Bill Janklow (1939–2012)	January 1, 1979 – January 10, 1987 (2932 days; term-limited)	Republican	1982	Lowell C. Hansen II
28	George S. Mickelson (1941–1993)	January 10, 1987 – April 19, 1993 (2292 days; died in office)	Republican	1986	Walter Dale Miller
28	George S. Mickelson (1941–1993)	January 10, 1987 – April 19, 1993 (2292 days; died in office)	Republican	1990	Walter Dale Miller
29	Walter Dale Miller (1925–2015)	April 19, 1993 – January 7, 1995 (629 days; lost nomination)	Republican	Succeeded from lieutenant governor	Steve T. Kirby
30	Bill Janklow (1939–2012)	January 7, 1995 – January 7, 2003 (2923 days; term-limited) (Note: Janklow, being term-limited, had already won election to the United States House of Representatives when his term ended.)	Republican	1994	Carole Hillard
30	Bill Janklow (1939–2012)	January 7, 1995 – January 7, 2003 (2923 days; term-limited)	Republican	1998	Carole Hillard
31	Mike Rounds (b. 1954)	January 7, 2003 – January 8, 2011 (2924 days; term-limited)	Republican	2002	Dennis Daugaard
31	Mike Rounds (b. 1954)	January 7, 2003 – January 8, 2011 (2924 days; term-limited)	Republican	2006	Dennis Daugaard
32	Dennis Daugaard (b. 1953)	January 8, 2011 – January 5, 2019 (2920 days; term-limited)	Republican	2010	Matt Michels
32	Dennis Daugaard (b. 1953)	January 8, 2011 – January 5, 2019 (2920 days; term-limited)	Republican	2014	Matt Michels
33	Kristi Noem (b. 1971)	January 5, 2019 – January 25, 2025 (2213 days; resigned) (Note: Noem resigned, having been confirmed as United States Secretary of Homeland Security.)	Republican	2018	Larry Rhoden
33	Kristi Noem (b. 1971)	January 5, 2019 – January 25, 2025 (2213 days; resigned)	Republican	2022	Larry Rhoden
34	Larry Rhoden (b. 1959)	January 25, 2025 – Incumbent (Note: Rhoden's term will expire on January 9, 2027; he was elected to a full term on November 3, 2026.) (in office 667 days)	Republican	Succeeded from lieutenant governor	Vacant
34	Larry Rhoden (b. 1959)	January 25, 2025 – Incumbent (in office 667 days)	Republican	Succeeded from lieutenant governor	Tony Venhuizen (appointed January 30, 2025)
34	Larry Rhoden (b. 1959)	January 25, 2025 – Incumbent (in office 667 days)	Republican	2026	Tony Venhuizen (appointed January 30, 2025)

== Electoral history (1950–) ==
Year	Democratic nominee			Republican nominee			Libertarian nominee			Independent candidate			Other candidate		
Year	Candidate	#	%	Candidate	#	%	Candidate	#	%	Candidate	#	%	Candidate	#	%
1950	Joe Robbie	99,062	39.11%	Sigurd Anderson	154,254	60.89%	–			–			–		
1952	Sherman A. Iverson	86,413	29.85%	Sigurd Anderson	203,102	70.15%	–			–			–		
1954	Ed C. Martin	102,377	43.33%	Joe Foss	133,878	56.67%	–			–			–		
1956	Ralph Herseth	133,198	45.61%	Joe Foss	158,819	54.39%	–			–			–		
1958	Ralph Herseth	132,761	51.40%	Phil Saunders	125,520	48.60%	–			–			–		
1960	Ralph Herseth	150,095	49.27%	Archie M. Gubbrud	154,530	50.73%	–			–			–		
1962	Ralph Herseth	112,438	43.90%	Archie M. Gubbrud	143,682	56.10%	–			–			–		
1964	John F. Lindley	140,919	48.33%	Nils Boe	150,151	51.67%	–			–			–		
1966	Robert Chamberlin	96,504	42.29%	Nils Boe	131,710	57.71%	–			–			–		
1968	Robert Chamberlin	117,260	42.35%	Frank Farrar	159,646	57.65%	–			–			–		
1970	Richard F. Kneip	131,616	54.85%	Frank Farrar	108,347	45.15%	–			–			–		
1972	Richard F. Kneip	185,012	60.03%	Carveth Thompson	123,165	39.97%	–			–			–		
1974	Richard F. Kneip	149,151	53.61%	John E. Olson	129,077	46.39%	–			–			–		
1978	Roger D. McKellips	112,679	43.37%	Bill Janklow	147,116	56.63%	–			–			–		
1982	Mike O'Connor	81,136	29.13%	Bill Janklow	197,429	70.87%	–			–			–		
1986	Lars Herseth	141,898	48.19%	George S. Mickelson	154,543	51.81%	–			–			–		
1990	Bob L. Samuelson	105,525	41.10%	George S. Mickelson	151,198	58.90%	–			–			–		
1994	Jim Beddow	126,273	40.52%	Bill Janklow	172,515	55.36%	Nathan A. Barton	12,825	4.12%	–			–		
1998	Bernie Hunhoff	85,473	32.85%	Bill Janklow	166,621	64.04%	Bob Newland	4,389	1.69%	Ronald Wieczorek	3,704	1.42%	–		
2002	Jim Abbott	140,263	41.92%	Mike Rounds	189,920	56.77%	Nathan A. Barton	1,983	0.59%	James P. Carlson	2,393	0.72%	–		
2006	Jack Billion	121,226	36.13%	Mike Rounds	206,990	61.69%	Tom Gerber	3,282	0.98%	–			Steven J. Willis (Constitution)	4,010	1.20%
2010	Scott Heidepriem	122,037	38.49%	Dennis Daugaard	195,046	61.51%	–			–			–		
2014	Susan Wismer	70,549	25.43%	Dennis Daugaard	195,477	70.47%	–			Michael J. Myers	11,377	4.10%	–		
2018	Billie Sutton	161,454	47.60%	Kristi Noem	172,912	50.97%	Kurt Evans	4,848	1.43%	–			–		
2022	Jamie Smith	123,148	35.17%	Kristi Noem	217,035	61.98%	Tracey Quint	9,983	2.85%	–			–		

== See also ==
- Gubernatorial lines of succession in the United States § South Dakota
- Lieutenant Governor of South Dakota
- List of governors of Dakota Territory
- List of South Dakota state legislatures

== Sources ==
- "Former South Dakota Governors". National Governors Association.
- "South Dakota Constitution". State Democracy Research Initiative. University of Wisconsin Law School.
- Glashan, Roy R. (1979). American Governors and Gubernatorial Elections, 1775-1978. Meckler Books. ISBN 0-7201-1511-6 – via Internet Archive.
- Kallenbach, Joseph E.; Kallenbach, Jessamine S. (1977). American State Governors, 1776-1976. Oceana Publications. ISBN 978-0-379-00665-0 – via Internet Archive.
- Mullaney, Marie Marmo (1994). Biographical Directory of the Governors of the United States, 1988–1994. Greenwood Publishing Group. ISBN 0-313-28312-5 – via Internet Archive.
- Sobel, Robert; Raimo, John (1978). Biographical Directory of the Governors of the United States, 1789-1978. Vol. 4. Meckler Books. ISBN 0-930466-01-2 – via Internet Archive.
- Thorpe, Francis Newton, ed. (1909). The Federal and State Constitutions, Colonial Charters, and Other Organic Laws of the States, Territories, and Colonies Now or Heretofore Forming the United States of America. Vol. 6. United States Government Publishing Office – via Internet Archive.
