= 1962 United States gubernatorial elections =

- November 6, 1962

35 governorships
	Majority party	Minority party
Party	Democratic	Republican
Seats before	34	16
Seats after	34	16
Seat change	Steady	Steady
Seats up	21	14
Seats won	21	14
- Democratic hold Democratic gain Republican hold Republican gain No election

United States gubernatorial elections were held on November 6, 1962 in 35 states, concurrent with the House and Senate elections.

In Minnesota, the governor was elected to a 4-year term for the first time, instead of a 2-year term. In North Dakota, this was the last election on a 2-year cycle, before switching to a 4-year term for governors.

The Democratic and Republican parties each gained seven governorships from the other party, leaving the overall partisan balance unchanged.

== Race summary ==
State	Governor	Party	First elected	Status	Candidates
Alabama	John Malcolm Patterson	Democratic	1958	Incumbent term-limited. Democratic hold.	▌ ✓ George Wallace (Democratic) 96.3%; ▌ Frank P. Walls (Republican) 3.7%
Alaska	William A. Egan	Democratic	1958	Incumbent re-elected.	▌ ✓ William A. Egan (Democratic) 52.3%; ▌ Mike Stepovich (Republican) 47.7%
Arizona	Paul Fannin	Republican	1958	Incumbent re-elected.	▌ ✓ Paul Fannin (Republican) 54.8%; ▌ Samuel Pearson Goddard Jr. (Democratic) 45.2%
Arkansas	Orval Faubus	Democratic	1954	Incumbent re-elected.	▌ ✓ Orval Faubus (Democratic) 73.3%; ▌ Willis Ricketts (Republican) 26.7%
California	Pat Brown	Democratic	1958	Incumbent re-elected.	▌ ✓ Pat Brown (Democratic) 51.9%; ▌ Richard Nixon (Republican) 46.9%; ▌Robert L. Wyckoff (Prohibition) 1.1%
Colorado	Stephen McNichols	Democratic	1956	Incumbent lost re-election. Republican gain.	▌ ✓ John A. Love (Republican) 56.7%; ▌ Stephen McNichols (Democratic) 42.6%; ▌ Louis K. Stephens (Socialist Labor) 0.4%; ▌ Stephen L. DeArvil (Independent) 0.3%
Connecticut	John N. Dempsey	Democratic	1961 (Note: Dempsey became governor in 1961 when predecessor (Abraham Ribicoff) resigned.)	Incumbent re-elected.	▌ ✓ John N. Dempsey (Democratic) 53.2%; ▌John deKoven Alsop (Republican) 46.8%
Georgia	Ernest Vandiver	Democratic	1958	Incumbent term-limited. Democratic hold.	▌ ✓ Carl Sanders (Democratic) 99.95%
Hawaii	William F. Quinn	Republican	1959	Incumbent lost re-election. Democratic gain.	▌ ✓ John A. Burns (Democratic) 58.3%; ▌ William F. Quinn (Republican) 41.7%
Idaho	Robert E. Smylie	Republican	1954	Incumbent re-elected.	▌ ✓ Robert E. Smylie (Republican) 54.6%; ▌ Vernon K. Smith (Democratic) 45.4%
Iowa	Norman A. Erbe	Republican	1960	Incumbent lost re-election. Democratic gain.	▌ ✓ Harold Hughes (Democratic) 52.6%; ▌ Norman A. Erbe (Republican) 47.4%
Kansas	John Anderson Jr.	Republican	1960	Incumbent re-elected.	▌ ✓ John Anderson Jr. (Republican) 53.4%; ▌ Dale E. Saffels (Democratic) 45.6%; ▌Vearl Bacon (Prohibition) 1.0%
Maine	John H. Reed	Republican	1959 (Note: Reed became governor in 1959 when predecessor (Clinton Clauson) died.)	Incumbent re-elected.	▌ ✓ John H. Reed (Republican) 50.08%; ▌ Maynard C. Dolloff (Democratic) 49.92%
Maryland	J. Millard Tawes	Democratic	1958	Incumbent re-elected.	▌ ✓ J. Millard Tawes (Republican) 55.6%; ▌Frank Small (Republican) 44.4%
Massachusetts	John Volpe	Republican	1960	Incumbent lost re-election. Democratic gain.	▌ ✓ Endicott Peabody (Democratic) 49.92%; ▌ John Volpe (Republican) 49.71%; ▌Henning A. Blomen (Socialist Labor) 0.26%; ▌Guy S. Williams (Prohibition) 0.11%
Michigan	John Swainson	Democratic	1960	Incumbent lost re-election. Republican gain.	▌ ✓ George W. Romney (Republican) 51.4%; ▌John Swainson (Democratic) 48.5%; ▌James Sim (Socialist Labor) 0.2%
Minnesota	Elmer L. Andersen	Republican	1960	Incumbent lost re-election. Democratic gain.	▌ ✓ Karl Rolvaag (DFL) 49.714%; ▌ Elmer L. Andersen (Republican) 49.706%; ▌ William Braatz (Industrial Government) 0.58%
Nebraska	Frank B. Morrison	Democratic	1960	Incumbent re-elected.	▌ ✓ Frank B. Morrison (Democratic) 52.2%; ▌ Fred A. Seaton (Republican) 47.8%
Nevada	Grant Sawyer	Democratic	1958	Incumbent re-elected.	▌ ✓ Grant Sawyer (Democratic) 66.8%; ▌ Oran K. Gragson (Republican) 33.2%
New Hampshire	Wesley Powell	Republican	1958	Incumbent lost renomination. Democratic gain.	▌ ✓ John W. King (Democratic) 58.9%; ▌ John Pillsbury (Republican) 41.1%
New Mexico	Edwin L. Mechem	Republican	1950; 1954 (retired); 1956; 1958 (lost); 1960	Incumbent lost re-election. Republican gain.	▌ ✓ Jack M. Campbell (Democratic) 53.0%; ▌Edwin L. Mechem (Republican) 47.0%
New York	Nelson Rockefeller	Republican	1958	Incumbent re-elected.	▌ ✓ Nelson Rockefeller (Republican) 53.1%; ▌ Robert Morgenthau (Democratic) 44.0%; ▌ David H. Jaquith (Conservative) 2.4%; ▌ Richard Garza (Socialist Workers) 0.3%; ▌ Eric Hass (Socialist Labor) 0.2%
North Dakota	William L. Guy	Democratic	1960	Incumbent re-elected.	▌ ✓ William L. Guy (Democratic-NPL) 50.44%; ▌ Mark Andrews (Republican) 49.56%
Ohio	Michael DiSalle	Democratic	1958	Incumbent lost re-election. Republican gain.	▌ ✓ Jim Rhodes (Republican) 58.9%; ▌ Michael DiSalle (Democratic) 41.1%
Oklahoma	J. Howard Edmondson	Democratic	1958	Incumbent term-limited. Republican gain.	▌ ✓ Henry Bellmon (Republican) 55.3%; ▌ W.P. Atkinson (Democratic) 44.4%; ▌ Richard Zavitz (Independent) 0.3%
Oregon	Mark Hatfield	Republican	1958	Incumbent re-elected.	▌ ✓ Mark Hatfield (Republican) 54.2%; ▌ Robert Y. Thornton (Democratic) 41.6%; ▌ Robert H. Wampler (Independent) 4.1%
Pennsylvania	David L. Lawrence	Democratic	1958	Incumbent term-limited. Republican gain.	▌ ✓ William Scranton (Republican) 55.4%; ▌ Richardson Dilworth (Democratic) 44.3%; ▌ George Sam Taylor (Socialist Labor) 0.33%
Rhode Island	John A. Notte Jr.	Democratic	1960	Incumbent lost re-election. Republican gain.	▌ ✓ John Chafee (Republican) 50.06%; ▌ John A. Notte Jr. (Democratic) 49.94%
South Carolina	Fritz Hollings	Democratic	1958	Incumbent term-limited. Democratic hold.	▌ Donald S. Russell (Democratic) 100.0%
South Dakota	Archie M. Gubbrud	Republican	1960	Incumbent re-elected.	▌ ✓ Archie M. Gubbrud (Republican) 56.1%; ▌ Ralph Herseth (Democratic) 43.9%
Tennessee	Buford Ellington	Democratic	1958	Incumbent term-limited. Democratic hold.	▌ ✓ Frank G. Clement (Democratic) 50.9%; ▌ William Anderson (Independent) 32.8%; ▌ Hubert David Patty (Republican) 16.1%; ▌ E.B. Bowles (Independent) 0.2%
Texas	Price Daniel	Democratic	1956	Incumbent lost renomination. Democratic hold.	▌ ✓ John Connally (Democratic) 54.0%; ▌ Jack Cox (Republican) 45.6%; ▌ Jack Carswell (Constitution) 0.45%
Vermont	F. Ray Keyser Jr.	Republican	1960	Incumbent lost re-election. Democratic gain.	▌ ✓ Philip H. Hoff (Democratic) 50.54%; ▌ F. Ray Keyser Jr. (Republican) 49.46%
Wisconsin	Gaylord Nelson	Democratic	1958	Incumbent retired. Democratic hold.	▌ ✓ John W. Reynolds Jr. (Democratic) 50.37%; ▌Philip G. Kuehn (Republican) 49.43%; ▌ Adolf Wiggert (Independent) 0.20%
Wyoming	Jack R. Gage	Democratic	1958	Incumbent lost re-election. Republican gain.	▌ ✓ Clifford Hansen (Republican) 54.5%; ▌ Jack R. Gage (Democratic) 45.5%

== Closest races ==
States where the margin of victory was under 1%:

1. Minnesota, 0.008%
2. Rhode Island, 0.12%
3. Maine, 0.16%
4. Massachusetts, 0.21%
5. North Dakota, 0.88%
6. Wisconsin, 0.94%

States where the margin of victory was under 5%:

1. Vermont, 1.08%
2. Michigan, 2.91%
3. Nebraska, 4.47%
4. Alaska, 4.54%

States where the margin of victory was under 10%:

1. California, 5.07%
2. Iowa, 5.12%
3. New Mexico, 5.97%
4. Connecticut, 6.42%
5. Kansas, 7.82%
6. Texas, 8.41%
7. Wyoming, 8.94%
8. New York, 9.12%
9. Idaho, 9.28%
10. Arizona, 9.66%

Red denotes states won by Republicans. Blue denotes states won by Democrats.

== See also ==
- 1962 United States elections
  - 1962 United States Senate elections
  - 1962 United States House of Representatives elections
