= 1968 United States Senate election in South Dakota =

- November 5, 1968

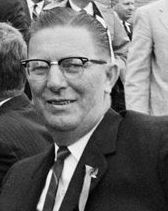
Nominee	George McGovern	Archie M. Gubbrud
Party	Democratic	Republican
Popular vote	158,961	120,951
Percentage	56.79%	43.21%
- County results McGovern: 50–60% 60–70% 70–80% Gubbrud: 50–60% 70–80%
U.S. senator before election
George McGovern
Democratic
Elected U.S. Senator
George McGovern
Democratic

The 1968 United States Senate election in South Dakota took place on November 5, 1968. Incumbent Democratic Senator George McGovern ran for re-election to a second term. He was challenged by former Governor Archie M. Gubbrud, who was persuaded to enter the race by the South Dakota Republican establishment. McGovern defeated Gubbrud by a wide margin, even as Richard Nixon was defeating Hubert Humphrey in the state's presidential election in a landslide.

== Primary elections ==
Both McGovern and Gubbrud were unopposed in their respective primaries. Gubbrud and incumbent Governor Nils Boe were seen as likely Republican candidates, but on March 22, Boe announced that he would not run. Shortly thereafter, a grassroots group of Republicans supportive of Gubbrud, named "Archie's Archers," started a campaign to persuade him to run, and received promises from other potential Republican candidates that they wouldn't run if Gubbrud did. On April 7, Gubbrud announced that he would run for the Senate, and subsequently received endorsements from prominent Republican figures, including former Vice-president Richard Nixon.

== General election ==
=== Results ===
1968 United States Senate election in South Dakota
Party	Candidate	Votes	%	±%
Democratic	George McGovern (incumbent)	158,961	56.79%	+6.67%
Republican	Archie M. Gubbrud	120,951	43.21%	−6.67%
Majority		38,010	13.58%	+13.34%
Turnout		279,912	100.00%	
Democratic hold				
