= 1958 South Dakota gubernatorial election =

- November 4, 1958
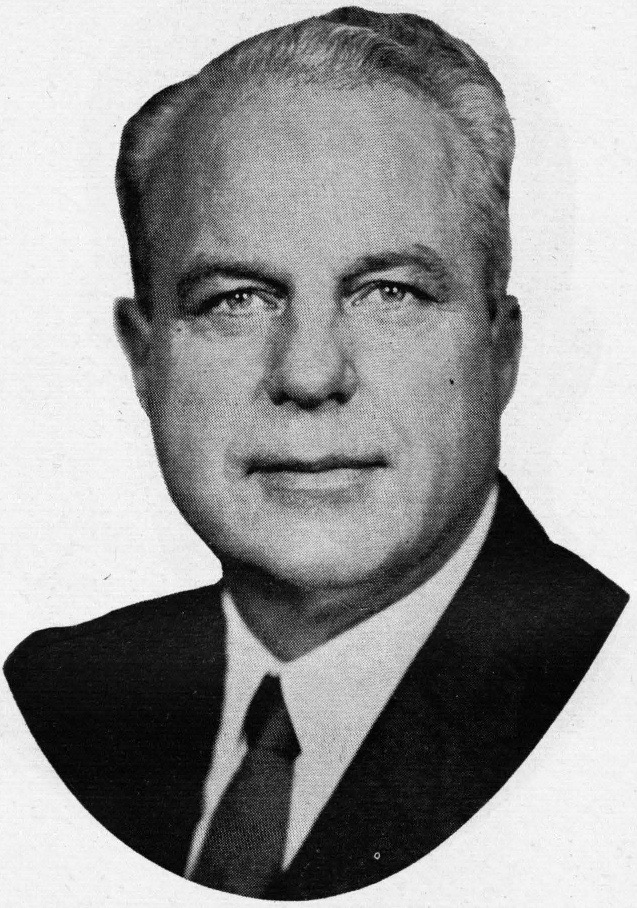

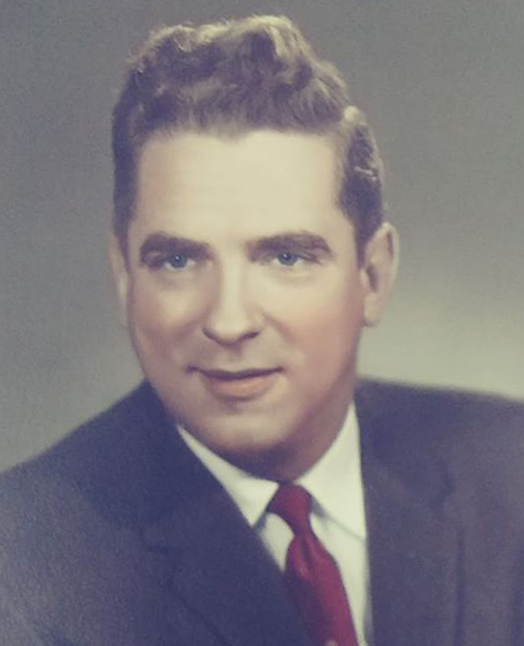
Nominee	Ralph Herseth	Phil Saunders
Party	Democratic	Republican
Popular vote	132,761	125,520
Percentage	51.40%	48.60%
- County results Herseth: 50–60% 60–70% Saunders: 50–60% 60–70% 70–80% Tie: 50%
Governor before election
Joe Foss
Republican
Elected Governor
Ralph Herseth
Democratic

The 1958 South Dakota gubernatorial election was held on November 4, 1958.

Incumbent Republican Governor Joe Foss was term-limited.

Democratic nominee Ralph Herseth defeated Republican nominee Phil Saunders with 51.40% of the vote.

== Primary elections ==
Primary elections were held on June 3, 1958.

=== Democratic primary ===
==== Candidates ====
- Ralph Herseth, State Senator

==== Results ====
Democratic primary results
Party	Candidate	Votes	%
Democratic	Ralph Herseth		unopposed

=== Republican primary ===
==== Candidates ====
- Phil Saunders, incumbent Attorney General of South Dakota
- L. Roy Houck, incumbent Lieutenant Governor
- Charles Lacey, state representative

==== Results ====
Republican primary results
Party	Candidate	Votes	%
Republican	Phil Saunders	49,746	61.60
Republican	L. Roy Houck	21,621	26.77
Republican	Charles Lacey	9,384	11.62
Total votes		80,751	100.00

== General election ==
=== Candidates ===
- Ralph Herseth, Democratic
- Phil Saunders, Republican

=== Results ===
1958 South Dakota gubernatorial election
Party	Candidate	Votes	%	±%
Democratic	Ralph Herseth	132,761	51.40%	
Republican	Phil Saunders	125,520	48.60%	
Majority		7,241	2.80%	
Turnout		258,281	100.00%	
Democratic gain from Republican		Swing		

== Bibliography ==
- Gubernatorial Elections, 1787-1997. Washington, D.C.: Congressional Quarterly Inc. 1998. ISBN 1-56802-396-0.
