= Joe Foss =

American politician and United States Marine Corps Medal of Honor recipient

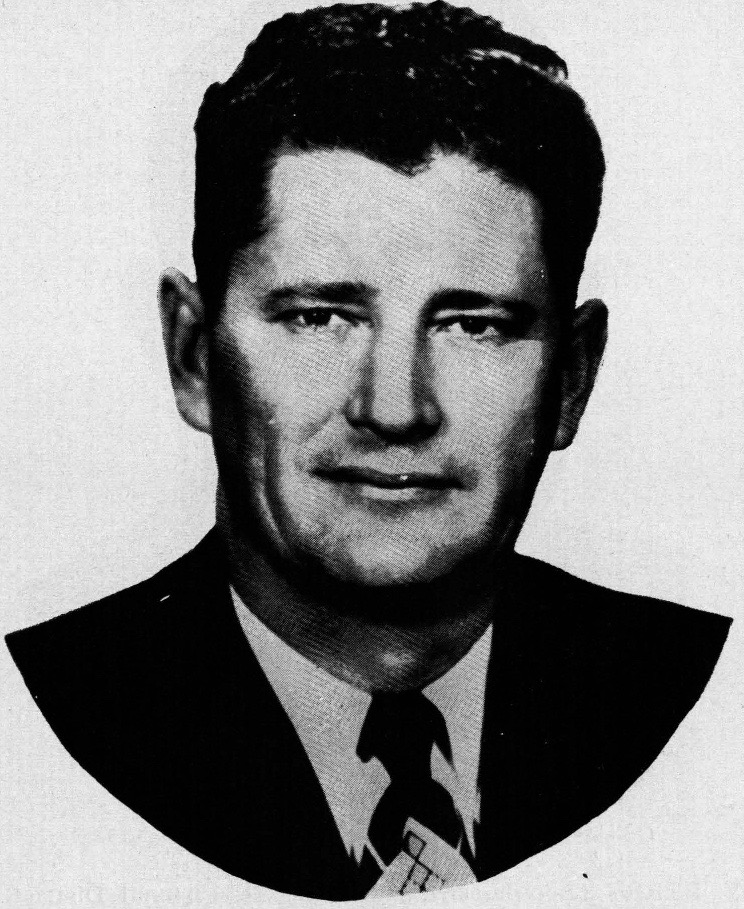
- Portrait of Foss as Governor, c. 1955-1959

President of the National Rifle Association
- In office 1988–1990
- Preceded by: James E. Reinke
- Succeeded by: Richard D. Riley

20th Governor of South Dakota
- In office January 6, 1955 – January 6, 1959
- Lieutenant: L. Roy Houck
- Preceded by: Sigurd Anderson
- Succeeded by: Ralph Herseth

Personal details
- Born: Joseph Jacob Foss; April 17, 1915 Sioux Falls, South Dakota, U.S.
- Died: January 1, 2003 (aged 87) Scottsdale, Arizona, U.S.
- Resting place: Arlington National Cemetery
- Party: Republican
- Spouses: June Shakstad (m. 1942; div. 1967) Donna Wild Hall (m. 1967)
- Occupation: American Football League Commissioner; NRA President; Television broadcaster Author; Entrepreneur; Spokesperson
- Nickname(s): "Smokey Joe", "Old Joe", "Old Foos", "Ace of Aces"

Military service
- Allegiance: United States
- Branch/service: South Dakota National Guard (1939–1940); United States Marine Corps (1940–1946); South Dakota Air National Guard (1946–1955)
- Years of service: 1939–1955
- Rank: Major (USMC); Brigadier General (ANG)
- Unit: VMF-121; VMF-115
- Battles/wars: World War II: Battle of Guadalcanal
- Awards: Medal of Honor; Distinguished Flying Cross; Air Medal (3)

Joseph Jacob Foss (April 17, 1915 – January 1, 2003) was a United States Marine Corps Major and a leading Marine fighter ace in World War II. He received the Medal of Honor in recognition of his role in air combat during the Guadalcanal campaign. In postwar years, he was an Air National Guard Brigadier General, served as the 20th governor of South Dakota (1955–1959), president of the National Rifle Association of America (NRA) and the first commissioner of the American Football League. He also was a television broadcaster.

== Early years ==
Foss was born in an unelectrified farmhouse near Sioux Falls, South Dakota, the oldest son of Mary Esther (née Lacey) and Frank Ole Foss. He was of Norwegian and Scottish descent. At age 12, he visited an airfield in Renner to see Charles Lindbergh on tour with his aircraft, the Spirit of St. Louis. Four years later, he and his father paid $1.50 apiece to take their first aircraft ride in a Ford Trimotor at Black Hills Airport with a famed South Dakota aviator, Clyde Ice.

In March 1933, while coming back from the fields during a storm, his father was killed when he drove over a downed electrical cable and was electrocuted as he stepped out of his automobile. Young Foss, not yet 18 years old, pitched in with his mother and brother Cliff to continue running the family farm.

After watching a Marine Corps aerial team, led by Capt. Clayton Jerome, perform aerobatics in open-cockpit biplanes, he was determined to become a Marine aviator. Foss worked at a service station to pay for books and college tuition, and to begin flight lessons from Roy Lanning, at the Sioux Skyway Airfield in 1938, scraping up $65 to pay for the instruction. His younger brother took over the management of the farm and allowed Foss to go back to school and graduate from Washington High School in Sioux Falls. He graduated from the University of South Dakota in 1939 with a degree in business administration.

While at USD, Foss and other like-minded students convinced authorities to set up a CAA flying course at the university; he built up 100 flight hours by graduation. Foss paid his way through university by bussing tables. He joined the Sigma chapter of the Sigma Alpha Epsilon fraternity and excelled at sports in USD, fighting on the college boxing team, participating as a member of the track team and as a second-string guard on the football team.

Foss served as a private in the 147th Field Artillery Regiment, Sioux Falls, South Dakota National Guard from 1939 to 1940. By 1940, armed with a pilot certificate and a college degree, Foss hitchhiked to Minneapolis to enlist in the Marine Corps Reserves, in order to join the Naval Aviation Cadet program to become a Naval Aviator.

== Military career ==
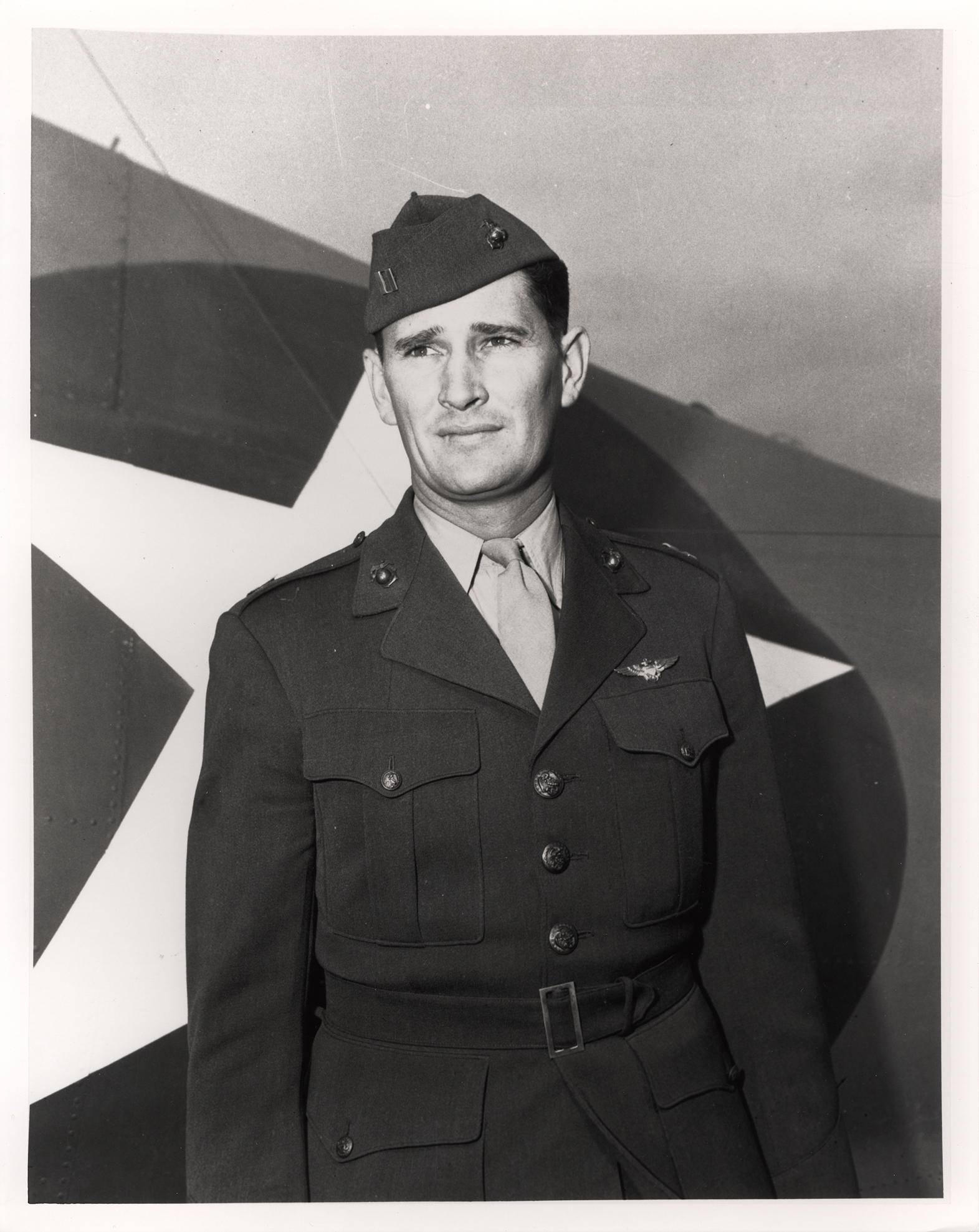
Foss during World War II

=== Effort to become a fighter pilot ===
Foss was accepted by the Marine Corps for flight school and commissioning. After graduation from flight school at NAS Pensacola, Florida he was designated a Naval Aviator and was commissioned as a Second Lieutenant, in the Marine Corps. He was then assigned as a "plowback" instructor at Pensacola teaching Navy, Marine, and Coast Guard students to be Naval Aviators. At 27 years of age, he was considered too old to be a fighter pilot, and was instead sent to the Navy School of Photography. Upon completion of his initial assignment, he was transferred to Marine Photographic Squadron 1 (VMO-1) stationed at Naval Air Station North Island in San Diego, California. Dissatisfied with his role in photographic reconnaissance, Foss made repeated requests to be transferred to a fighter qualification program. He checked out in Grumman F4F Wildcats while still assigned to VMO-1, logging over 150 flight hours in June and July, 1942, and was eventually transferred to Marine Fighting Squadron 121 VMF-121 as the executive officer. (Note: Although only 27, his squadron mates gave him the unflattering nickname of "Old Foos.") While stateside, Foss married his high school sweetheart, June Shakstad in 1942.

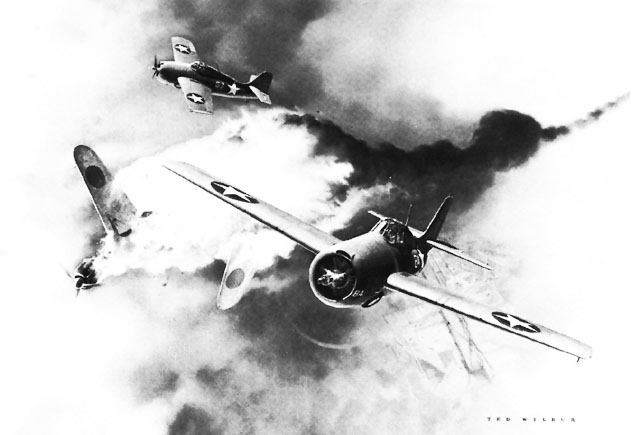
Watercolor of U.S. Marine Captain Joe Foss shooting down a Zero over Guadalcanal in October 1942

=== Guadalcanal Flying Ace ===
In October 1942, VMF-121 pilots and aircraft were sent to Guadalcanal as part of Operation Watchtower to relieve VMF-223, which had been fighting for control of the air over the island since mid-August. On October 9, Foss and his group were catapult launched off the USS Copahee escort carrier and flew 350 miles (560 km) north to reach Guadalcanal. The air group, code named "Cactus", based at Henderson Field became known as the Cactus Air Force, and their presence played a pivotal role in the Battle of Guadalcanal. Foss soon gained a reputation for aggressive close-in fighter tactics and uncanny gunnery skills. (Note: To preserve the scarce ammunition at Henderson, Foss removed one machine gun from each wing and relied on his "ability to shoot." At least four engagements were broken off when Foss ran out of ammunition.) Foss shot down a Japanese Zero on his first combat mission on October 13, but his own F4F Wildcat was shot up as well, and with a dead engine and three more Zeros on his tail, he landed at full speed, with no flaps and minimal control on Henderson Field, barely missing a grove of palm trees. On 7 November his Wildcat was again hit, and he survived a ditching in the sea off the island of Malaita.

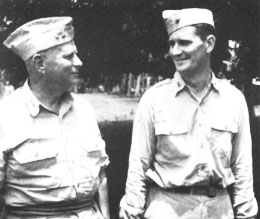
Foss stands with Cactus Air Force commander MajGen Roy Geiger.

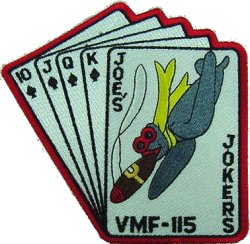
An alternate logo used by the Marine Fighting Squadron 115 was "... drawn by the Disney Studios (...) is exemplary of the squadron itself, and the cigar pays tribute to Major Joe Foss' ever-present 'stogie' (...) the name was chosen by popular vote."

As lead pilot in his flight of eight Wildcats, the group soon became known as "Foss's Flying Circus", with two sections Foss nicknamed "Farm Boys" and "City Slickers." In December 1942, Foss contracted malaria. He was sent to Sydney, Australia for rehabilitation, where he met Australian ace Clive "Killer" Caldwell and delivered some lectures on operational flying to RAF pilots, newly assigned to the theater. On January 1, 1943, Foss returned to Guadalcanal, to continue combat operations which lasted until February 9, 1943, although the Japanese attacks had waned from the height of the November 1942 crisis. In three months of sustained combat, Foss's Flying Circus had shot down 72 Japanese aircraft, including 26 credited to him. Upon matching the record of 26 kills held by America's top World War I ace, Eddie Rickenbacker, Foss was accorded the honor of becoming America's first "ace-of-aces" in World War II. One of the Japanese he shot down was ace Kaname Harada, who became a peace activist and met Foss many years later.

Foss returned to the United States in March 1943. On May 18, 1943, Foss received the Medal of Honor from President Franklin Delano Roosevelt. The White House ceremony was featured in Life magazine, with the reluctant Captain Foss appearing on the magazine's cover. He then was asked to participate in a war bond tour that stretched into 1944.

=== Return to combat ===
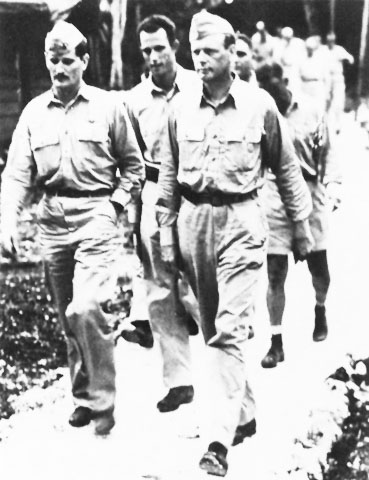
L–R (foreground) Maj. Joe Foss, Maj. Marion Carl and advisor Charles Lindbergh in South Pacific, May 1944

In February 1944, Foss returned to the Pacific theater to lead VMF-115, flying the F4U Corsair. VMF-115 was based in the combat zone around Emirau, St. Mathias Group in 1944. It was during this second tour that Foss met and became friends with fellow Marine fighter ace Marion Carl. He also had an opportunity to meet and fly with his boyhood idol, Charles Lindbergh, who was on assignment touring the South Pacific as an aviation consultant. After eight months of operational flying but no opportunities to increase his wartime score, Foss finished his combat service as one of America's top scoring pilots.

Foss again contracted malaria, and was sent home to the Klamath Falls, Oregon Rehabilitation Center. (Note: Foss had lost considerable weight during 20 bouts of malaria until successful treatment in the United States brought him back to health. He only weighed 140 lbs when he entered rehabilitation.) In February 1945, he became operations and training officer at the Marine Corps Air Station Santa Barbara, California. (Note: Foss gained fame in the service and later, in civilian life, as a "cigar-smoking", Stetson hatted, larger-than-life boisterous character.)

== Postwar ==
=== Air National Guard ===
In August 1945, Foss was released to inactive duty and opened Joe Foss Flying Service, charter flying service and flight instruction school in Sioux Falls, that eventually grew into a 35-aircraft operation. With a friend, Duane "Duke" Corning, he later owned a Packard car dealership in the town.

In October 1945, Foss was ordered to appear at Navy Day ceremonies in four cities there and was finally relieved from active duty in December 1945 but was retained in the Marine Corps Reserve on inactive duty until 1947. In 1946, Foss was appointed a Lieutenant Colonel in the South Dakota Air National Guard and instructed to form the South Dakota Air National Guard, becoming the Commanding Officer for the Guard's 175th Fighter-Interceptor Squadron. During the unit's formative years, Foss was actively involved in administration and flying with the squadron, even becoming a member of their North American P-51 Mustang air demonstration team. During the Korean War, Foss, then a Colonel, was called to active duty with the United States Air Force, relinquishing command of the 175th Squadron, and served as a Director of Operations and Training for the Central Air Defense Command; he eventually reached the rank of Brigadier General.

=== Political career ===
Campaigning from the cockpit of a light aircraft, Foss served two elected terms as a Republican representative in the South Dakota legislature and, beginning in 1955, at age 39, as the state's youngest governor. During his tenure as governor, he accompanied Tom Brokaw, then a high school student and Governor of South Dakota American Legion Boys State, to New York City for a joint appearance on Two for the Money, a television game show, which featured Foss because of his wartime celebrity. (Note: Both Brokaw and Foss each won $612.) Foss had previously appeared on the long-running game show What's My Line on May 1, 1955. (Note: Foss signed in using his middle name, Jacob, in a further effort to stump the panel. It was revealed through the panel's questioning that Foss had been in Las Vegas attending a demonstration at the Nevada Test Site where he met What's My Line host John Daly.)

In 1958, Foss unsuccessfully sought a seat in the U.S. House of Representatives, having been defeated by another wartime pilot hero, the Democrat George McGovern. Foss tried to re-enter politics in 1962 in a campaign to succeed Sen. Francis Case, who died in office.

== Later careers ==
=== American Football League ===
After serving as governor, Foss spent a short time working for Raven Industries before becoming the first Commissioner of the newly created American Football League in 1959. He oversaw the emergence of the league as the genesis of modern professional football. During the next seven years, Foss helped expand the league and made lucrative television deals, including the initial five-year, $10.6 million contract with ABC in 1960 to broadcast AFL games. The next contract was also for five years, but with NBC for a substantially greater $36 million, starting in 1965.

Foss stepped aside as commissioner in April 1966, two months before the historic agreement that led to the merger of AFL and NFL and the creation of the Super Bowl. Al Davis succeeded him, but disagreed with the merger and resigned after 3 1/2 months. Milt Woodard, the assistant commissioner under Foss, was named to the new office of president of the AFL in July and served through the league's final season in 1969.

=== Television career ===
Drawing on a lifelong love of hunting and the outdoors, Foss hosted ABC television's The American Sportsman from 1964 to 1967, which took him around the world for hunting and fishing excursions. He then hosted and produced his own syndicated outdoors TV series, The Outdoorsman: Joe Foss, from 1967 to 1974. In 1972, he also began a six-year stint as Director of Public Affairs for KLM Royal Dutch Airlines.

=== National Rifle Association ===
Starting in 1988, Foss was elected to two consecutive one-year terms as president of the National Rifle Association of America. In his later years he maintained a rigorous speaking schedule and spoke out for conservative causes on what he considered a weakening of gun owners' rights. He was portrayed on the cover of the January 29, 1990 issue of Time Magazine wearing his trademark Stetson hat and holding a revolver.

=== Philanthropy ===
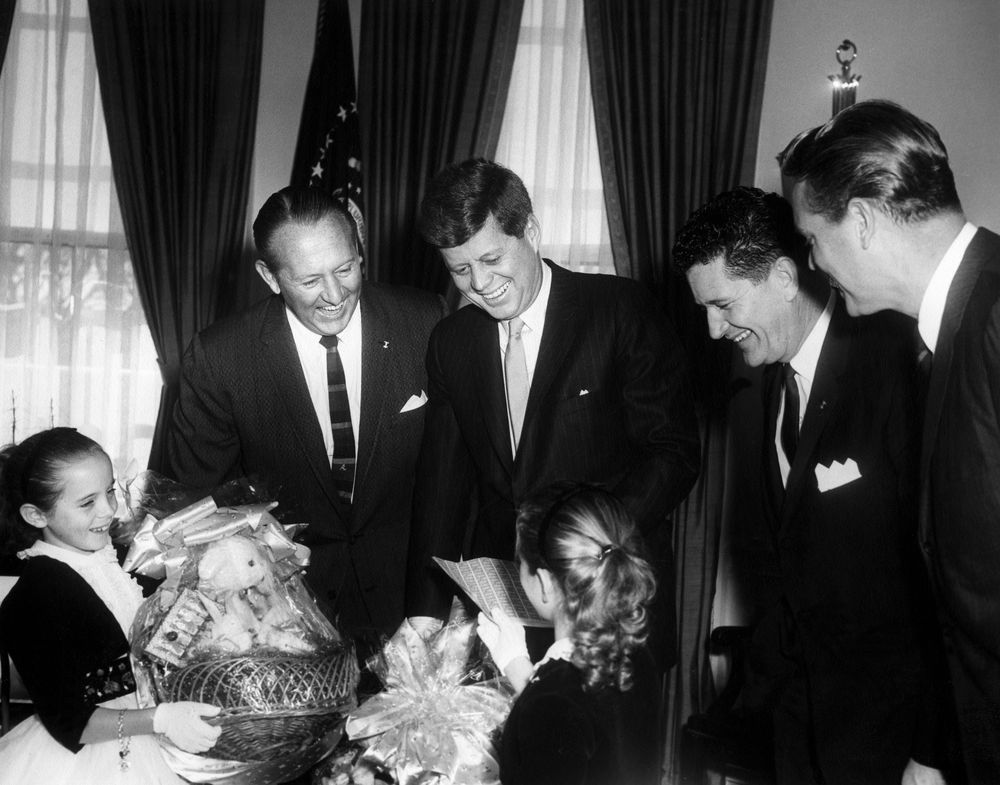
Easter Seal Twins, Paula and Patricia Webber (Sumter, South Carolina); National Easter Seal Chairman Art Linkletter; President John F. Kennedy; President of the National Society for Crippled Children and Adults, Joseph Foss; Governor of South Carolina Ernest Hollings. Oval Office, White House, Washington, D.C. in 1961.

Foss, who had a daughter with cerebral palsy, served as President of the National Society of Crippled Children and Adults. Foss's other charities included the Easter Seals campaign, Campus Crusade for Christ, and an Arizona program for disadvantaged youths.

=== The Joe Foss Institute ===
In 2001, Foss and his second wife, "Didi," (Note: Foss married Donna Wild Foss, known as "Didi" in 1967.) founded the Joe Foss Institute, a 501(c)(3) nonprofit organization. The institute works with veterans and educators around the United States to educate the nation's youth on history and civics, and to inspire them to become informed and engaged citizens. Through classroom presentations, curriculum and scholarships, the Joe Foss Institute has served more than 1.35 million children, as of June 2014, nationwide. Currently, the institute offers three primary programs; Veterans Inspiring Patriotism (VIP), You are America Civics Series and scholarship contests which run year-round. Foss did many of these school visits himself, speaking to children of all ages about service, responsibility, patriotism, integrity and commitment.

=== Other honors and recognition ===
Foss co-authored or was the subject of three books including the wartime Joe Foss: Flying Marine (with Walter Simmons); Top Guns (with Matthew Brennan); and A Proud American by his wife, Donna Wild Foss. Foss also provided the foreword to Above and Beyond: the Aviation Medals of Honor by Barrett Tillman, and was profiled in Tom Brokaw's 1998 book about World War II and its warriors, The Greatest Generation. Brokaw characterized Foss: "He had a hero's swagger but a winning smile to go with his plain talk and movie-star looks. Joe Foss was larger than life, and his heroics in the skies over the Pacific were just the beginning of a journey that would take him to places far from that farm with no electricity and not much hope north of Sioux Falls."Brave Eagle, a 1955 postwar effort to film a story of Foss's life, starring his friend, John Wayne, fell through in 1956 when Foss refused to allow the producers to add a fictitious love story. American Ace: The Joe Foss Story was an award-winning, hour-length television documentary, produced by the South Dakota Public Broadcasting, first aired in fall 2006.

Foss was inducted into the National Aviation Hall of Fame in 1984. He also was a president and board chairman of the Air Force Association and as a Director of the United States Air Force Academy. In 2000, he served as a consultant on the popular computer game Combat Flight Simulator 2 by Microsoft. A complete listing of Foss's affiliations and honors is given at The Joe Foss Institute.

== Later years ==
On January 11, 2002, Foss, then 86, was detained by security at the Phoenix Sky Harbor International Airport. He was scheduled to deliver an address at the National Rifle Association and speak to a class at the United States Military Academy at West Point. A search necessitated by his pacemaker precluding a metal detector screening had led to the discovery of the star-shaped Medal of Honor, along with a clearly marked dummy-bullet keychain, a second replica bullet and a small nail file (with MOH insignia).

Newsman Jack Cafferty noted that airport security personnel demonstrated poor judgment in not recognizing the Medal of Honor and in demanding to confiscate and destroy the medal and related memorabilia. He eventually lost a souvenir replica bullet, but was able to retain his Medal of Honor and commemorative nail file, by shipping it back to himself.

"I wasn't upset for me ... I was upset for the Medal of Honor, that they just didn't know what it even was. It represents all of the guys who lost their lives – the guys who never came back. Everyone who put their lives on the line for their country. You're supposed to know what the Medal of Honor is", he said.

The incident led to a national debate about post 9/11 airport security practices and their ramifications on the average citizen.

== Death ==
Foss suffered a stroke in October 2002 when he bled from a cerebral aneurysm. He died three months later on New Year's Day, 2003, never having regained consciousness, in Scottsdale, Arizona, where he and his wife had made their home in later years. Vice President Dick Cheney, retired Lt. Colonel Oliver North and South Dakota native and NBC News anchor Tom Brokaw were among those who attended with North delivering the eulogy.

Actor Charlton Heston gave a brief tribute to his old friend. Foss was buried at Arlington National Cemetery in Section 7A, Lot 162 on January 21, 2003. Family, friends, military personnel and dignitaries remembered him fondly at a service in Arlington and at an earlier "Memorial Service for an American Patriot" in the old chapel at nearby Fort Myer.

== Memorials ==
A number of institutions and locations have been named in honor of Foss, including Marine Corps Air Station Miramar Joe Foss Field, the Joe Foss Field Air National Guard Station in Sioux Falls, South Dakota, the Joe Foss Field at the Sioux Falls Regional Airport (Note: A larger-than-life bronze statue of Foss is in the lobby of the Sioux Falls Regional Airport.) (Note: Joe Foss Field Air National Guard Station is located at Sioux Falls Regional Airport.), Joe Foss High School also in Sioux Falls, and the State Building in Pierre, South Dakota. A larger-than-life bronze statue of Foss stands in the lobby of the Sioux Falls Regional Airport.

The Joe Foss Shooting Complex in Buckeye, Arizona, is also named in his honor. A private road in Scottsdale, Arizona, owned by General Dynamics, was renamed "Joe Foss Way" and dedicated on May 20, 2003.

In 1984, Foss was inducted into the National Aviation Hall of Fame in Dayton, Ohio.

Foss was inducted into the Naval Aviation Hall of Honor at the National Naval Aviation Museum in Pensacola, Florida, in 1994.

== Aerial victories ==
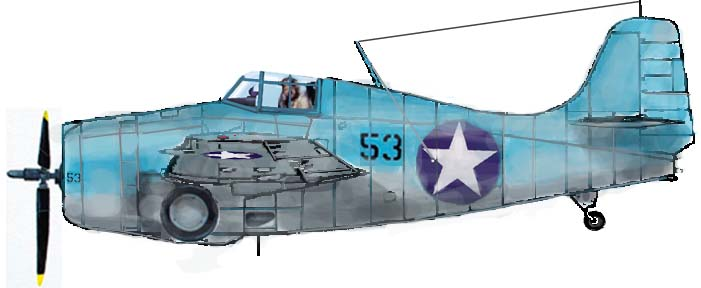
Profile drawing of a Grumman F4F Wildcat flown by Joe Foss (Guadalcanal, c. 1942)

The Marine Corps credits Foss with 26 air victories, and Marine ace Robert M. Hanson with 25 victories. However, the Marine Corps credits Marine ace Gregory "Pappy" Boyington with 28 American victories. This is due to Boyington's (22 Marine victories) wartime claim of 6 victories scored while serving with the Flying Tigers (American Volunteer Group-AVG) in China at the beginning of World War II, prior to him rejoining the Marine Corps;

AVG records show that Boyington was paid for 3.5 enemy aircraft destroyed (2-air, 1.5-ground). The American Fighter Aces Association credits Boyington with 24 victories (22 with the Marine Corps and 2 with the AVG).

Date	Total	Aircraft types claimed
October 13, 1942	1	A6M Allied reporting name: "Zeke" destroyed (Cactus)
October 14, 1942	1	A6M "Zeke" destroyed (Cactus)
October 18, 1942	3	2 A6M "Zekes" and 1 G4M "Betty" destroyed (Cactus)
October 20, 1942	2	A6M "Zekes" destroyed (Cactus)
October 23, 1942	4	A6M "Zekes" destroyed (Cactus)
October 25, 1942	2	A6M "Zekes" destroyed (Cactus)
October 25, 1942	3	A6M "Zekes" destroyed (Cactus)
November 7, 1942	3	1 A6M2-N "Rufe" and 2 F1M2 "Petes" destroyed (Cactus), but was shot down by the rear gunner of a Pete he shot down. Postwar records show the Japanese lost only one Pete that day.
November 12, 1942	3	2 G4M "Bettys" and 1 A6M Zero destroyed (Cactus)
November 15, 1942	1	E13A "Jake" destroyed (Cactus)
January 15, 1943	3	A6M "Zekes" destroyed (Cactus)
	26	

== Military awards ==
Foss's military decorations and awards include:

Badge	United States Air Force Command Pilot Badge		
Badge	Naval Aviator Badge		
1st Row	Medal of Honor		
2nd row	Distinguished Flying Cross	Air Medal w/ two gold stars	Air Force Presidential Unit Citation with one bronze oak leaf cluster
3rd row	Navy Presidential Unit Citation with one service star	American Defense Service Medal	American Campaign Medal
4th row	Asiatic-Pacific Campaign Medal with two campaign stars	World War II Victory Medal	National Defense Service Medal with one service star
5th row	Air Force Longevity Service Award with one bronze oak leaf cluster	Armed Forces Reserve Medal silver hourglass device	Small Arms Expert Marksmanship Ribbon

=== Medal of Honor citation ===
The President of the United States takes pleasure in presenting the CONGRESSIONAL MEDAL OF HONOR to

CAPTAIN JOSEPH J. FOSS
UNITED STATES MARINE CORPS RESERVE
for service as set forth in the following CITATION:

For outstanding heroism and courage above and beyond the call of duty as Executive Officer of a Marine Fighting Squadron, at Guadalcanal, Solomon Islands. Engaging in almost daily combat with the enemy from October 9 to November 19, 1942, Captain Foss personally shot down 23 Japanese aircraft and damaged others so severely that their destruction was extremely probable. In addition, during this period, he successfully led a large number of escort missions, skillfully covering reconnaissance, bombing and photographic planes as well as surface craft. On January 15, 1943, he added three more enemy aircraft to his already brilliant successes for a record of aerial combat achievement unsurpassed in this war. Boldly searching out an approaching enemy force on January 25, Captain Foss led his eight F4F Marine planes and four Army P-38s into action and, undaunted by tremendously superior numbers, intercepted and struck with such force that four Japanese fighters were shot down and the bombers were turned back without releasing a single bomb. His remarkable flying skill, inspiring leadership and indomitable fighting spirit were distinctive factors in the defense of strategic American positions on Guadalcanal.

/S/ Franklin D. Roosevelt

== See also ==
- List of Medal of Honor recipients for World War II
- American Football League players, coaches and contributors

Party political offices
Preceded by Sigurd Anderson	Republican nominee for Governor of South Dakota; 1954, 1956	Succeeded by Phil Saunders
Political offices
Preceded by Sigurd Anderson	Governor of South Dakota; 1955–1959	Succeeded by Ralph Herseth
National Rifle Association of America
Preceded by James E. Reinke	President of the NRA; 1988–1990	Succeeded by Richard D. Riley
