= Senator Houck =

Senator Houck may refer to:

- Edd Houck (born 1950), Virginia State Senate
- L. Roy Houck (1905–1992), South Dakota State Senate
