= 1964 South Dakota gubernatorial election =

- November 3, 1964
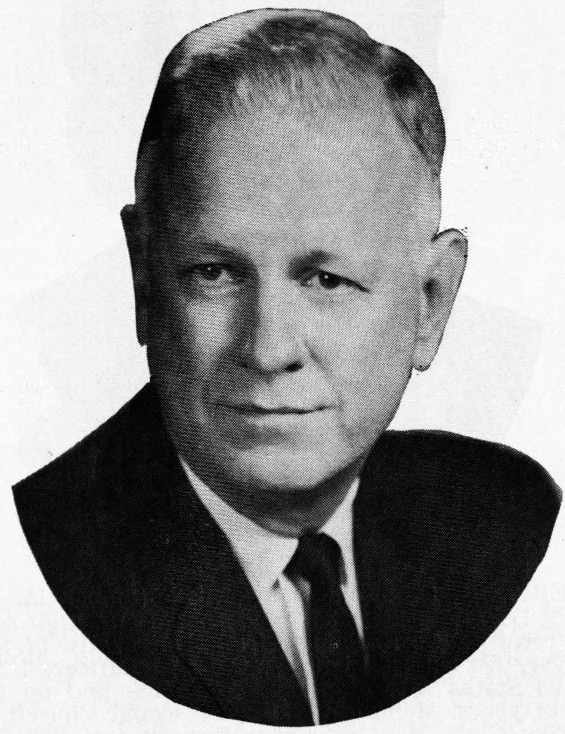

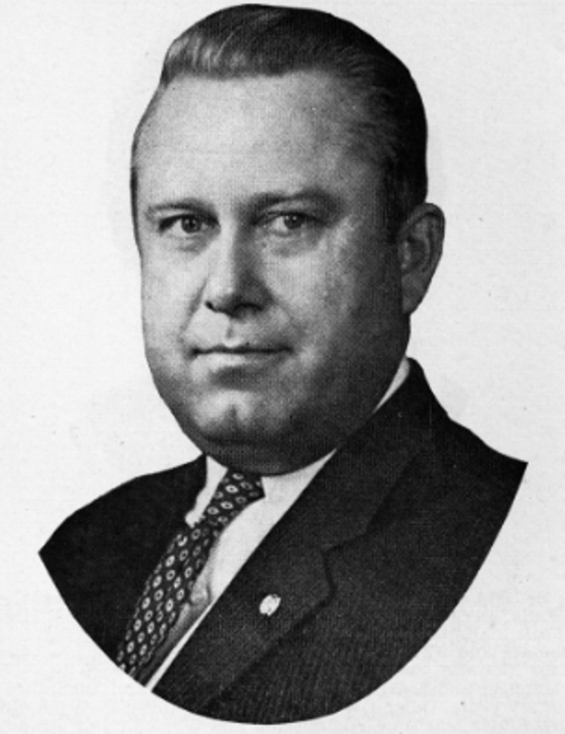
Nominee	Nils Boe	John F. Lindley
Party	Republican	Democratic
Popular vote	150,151	140,919
Percentage	51.67%	48.33%
- County results Boe: 50–60% 60–70% 70–80% Lindley: 50–60% 60–70% 70–80%
Governor before election
Archie M. Gubbrud
Republican
Elected Governor
Nils Boe
Republican

The 1964 South Dakota gubernatorial election was held on November 3, 1964.

Incumbent Republican Governor Archie M. Gubbrud did not run for re-election.

Republican nominee Nils Boe defeated Democratic nominee John F. Lindley with 51.68% of the vote.

== Primary elections ==
Primary elections were held on June 2, 1964.

=== Democratic primary ===
==== Candidates ====
- John F. Lindley, former Lieutenant Governor
- Merton B. Tice, unsuccessful candidate for Democratic nomination for 1956 United States Senate election in South Dakota

==== Results ====
Democratic primary results
Party	Candidate	Votes	%
Democratic	John F. Lindley	27,071	65.83
Democratic	Merton B. Tice	14,051	34.17
Total votes		41,122	100.00

=== Republican primary ===
==== Candidates ====
- Nils Boe, incumbent Lieutenant Governor
- Sigurd Anderson, former Governor

==== Results ====
Republican primary results
Party	Candidate	Votes	%
Republican	Nils Boe	50,335	53.47
Republican	Sigurd Anderson	43,809	46.53
Total votes		94,144	100.00

== General election ==
=== Candidates ===
- John F. Lindley, Democratic
- Nils Boe, Republican

=== Results ===
1964 South Dakota gubernatorial election
Party	Candidate	Votes	%	±%
Republican	Nils Boe	150,151	51.67%	
Democratic	John F. Lindley	140,419	48.33%	
Majority		9,732	3.35%	
Turnout		290,570	100.00%	
Republican hold		Swing		

== Bibliography ==
- Gubernatorial Elections, 1787-1997. Washington, D.C.: Congressional Quarterly Inc. 1998. ISBN 1-56802-396-0.
- Scammon, Richard M., ed. (1966). America Votes 6: a handbook of contemporary American election statistics, 1964. Washington, D.C.: Governmental Affairs Institute.
