= VMFA-115 =

Marine Fighter Attack Squadron 115
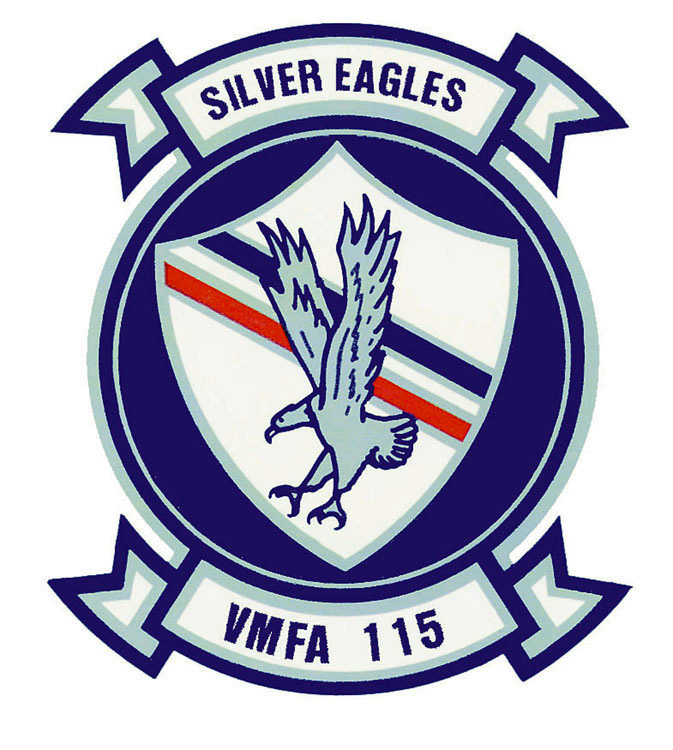
- VMFA-115 insignia
- Active: 1 July 1943 – 9 November 2023 31 July 2026 - Present
- Country: United States of America
- Branch: United States Marine Corps
- Type: Fighter/Attack
- Role: Close air support Air interdiction Aerial reconnaissance
- Part of: Marine Aircraft Group 31; 2nd Marine Aircraft Wing
- Garrison/HQ: Marine Corps Air Station Cherry Point
- Nicknames: Silver Eagles; Joe's Jokers; Able Eagles (Korea and Vietnam); Blade (callsign)
- Tail Code: VE
- Mascot: Sam the Eagle
- Engagements: World War II; Philippines campaign (1944–45); Korean War; Attack on the Sui-ho Dam; Vietnam War; Operation Desert Storm; Operation Iraqi Freedom; 2003 invasion of Iraq

Commanders
- Commanding Officer: LtCol Hugh Anderson
- Executive Officer: LtCol A. R. Desy
- Notable commanders: Maj. Joe Foss

Aircraft flown
- Fighter: F4U-1/FG-1D Corsair (1943-49); F9F-2/4 Panther (1949-57); F4D-1 Skyray (1957-64); F-4 Phantom II (1964-85); F/A-18A/A+/A++/C+ Hornet (1985–2023); F-35C Lightning II (2026-Present)

Marine Fighter Attack Squadron 115 (VMFA-115) is a United States Marine Corps F-35C Lightning II squadron. Officially nicknamed the "Silver Eagles" and on occasion Joe's Jokers after their first commanding officer Major Joe Foss, the squadron is based at Marine Corps Air Cherry Point, North Carolina and falls under the command of Marine Aircraft Group 14 (MAG-14) and the 2nd Marine Aircraft Wing (2nd MAW). The squadron participated in combat operations during World War II, the Korean and Vietnam Wars and has deployed in support of Operation Iraqi Freedom with a final deployment in 2008 to Al Asad Airbase in western Iraq. The Squadron radio callsign is "Blade".

== Mission ==
Intercept and destroy enemy aircraft under all-weather conditions and attack and destroy surface targets.

== History ==
=== World War II ===
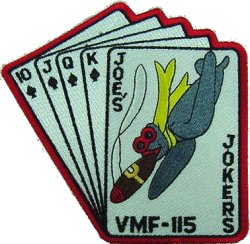
An alternate logo used by the squadron was "... drawn by the Disney Studios (...) is exemplary of the squadron itself, and the cigar pays tribute to Major Joe Foss' ever-present 'stogie' (...) the name was chosen by popular vote."

Marine Fighting Squadron 115 (VMF-115) was organized on 1 July 1943 at Marine Corps Air Station Santa Barbara, California, as a F4U Corsair squadron. One of the Marine Corps most famous aces, Major Joseph Foss assumed command 16 days later. The squadron gained the nickname "Joe's Jokers", and in May 1944 joined the Pacific campaign. VMF-115 was a contributor to the American victory in the Philippines providing close air support, fighter cover, and deep air strikes in Mindanao and the Sulu Archipelago. With over 18,000 flight hours during 5,856 combat sorties, VMF-115 was credited with shooting down 6½ enemy aircraft while losing 28 aircraft with nine pilots killed in action.

To protect U.S. interests after the war and support Marines supervising the surrender of Japan, the squadron deployed to Peking, China. Communist troops began patterns of hostility leading to convoy coverage and "air presence" missions. 31 months after initial deployment, VMF-115 left the Pacific theater.

=== Korean War ===
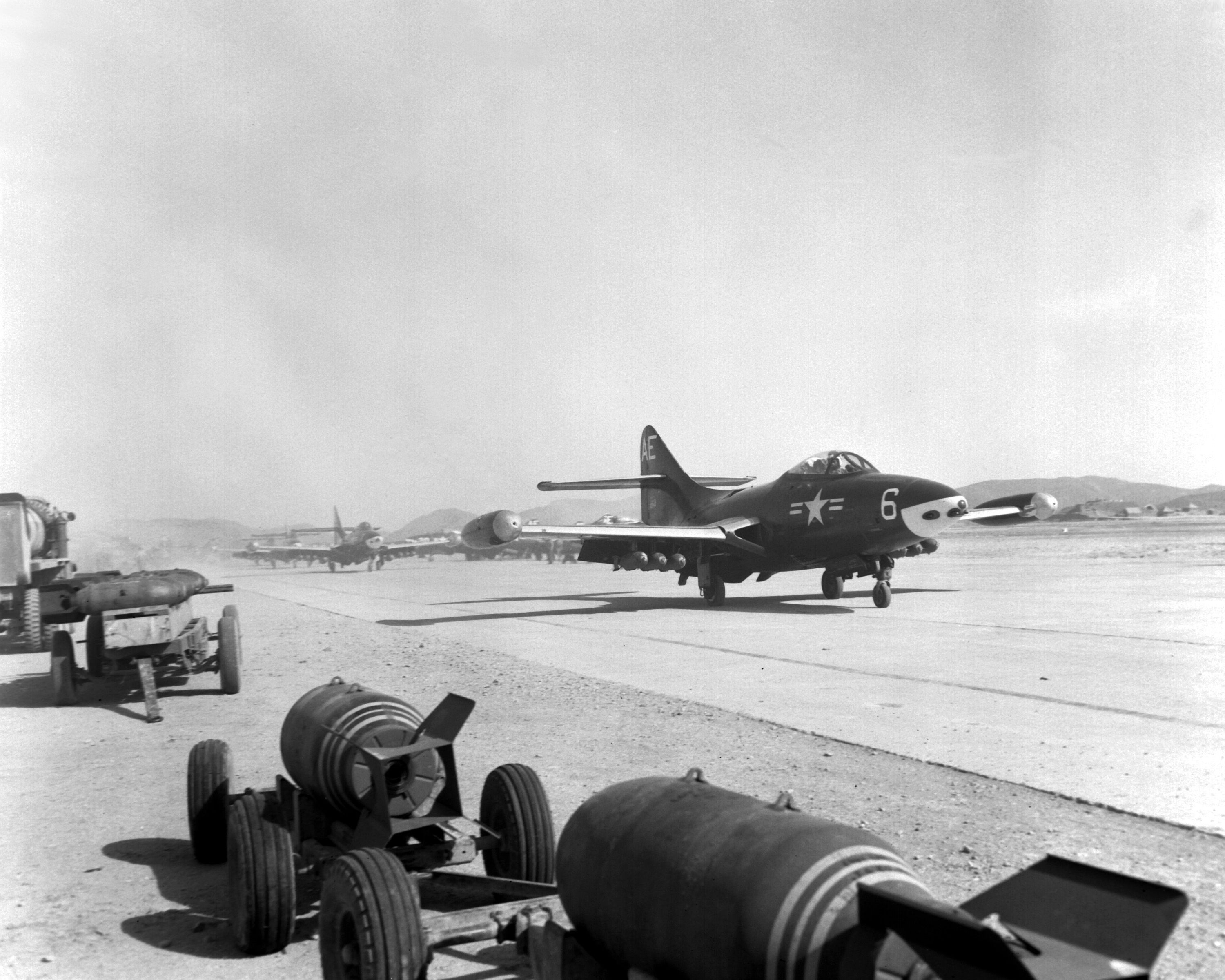
VMF-115 F9F Panthers at Pohang, Korea, in 1953.

In 1949, VMF-115 was the first Marine Corps squadron equipped with Grumman F9F-2 Panther jets, and on 20 November 1950, the first Marine squadron to carrier qualify all 18 pilots aboard the USS Franklin D. Roosevelt. The squadron then deployed to Pohang, Korea, for combat operation in February 1952. In late-June 1952 they participated in the attack on the Sui-ho Dam. Throughout the Korean War, VMF-115 expended more ordnance than any other Marine jet fighter squadron. A total of 15,350 flight hours were logged on 9,250 combat sorties with a price of 19 aircraft lost. Six pilots were lost with their aircraft in a single day and a total of 14 pilots were killed in action. Close air support was provided by VMF-115 in battles such as Bunker Hill, The Hook, Reno, Carson-Elko, Vegas, Berlin, East Berlin, and the Marines famous battle at the Chosin Reservoir.

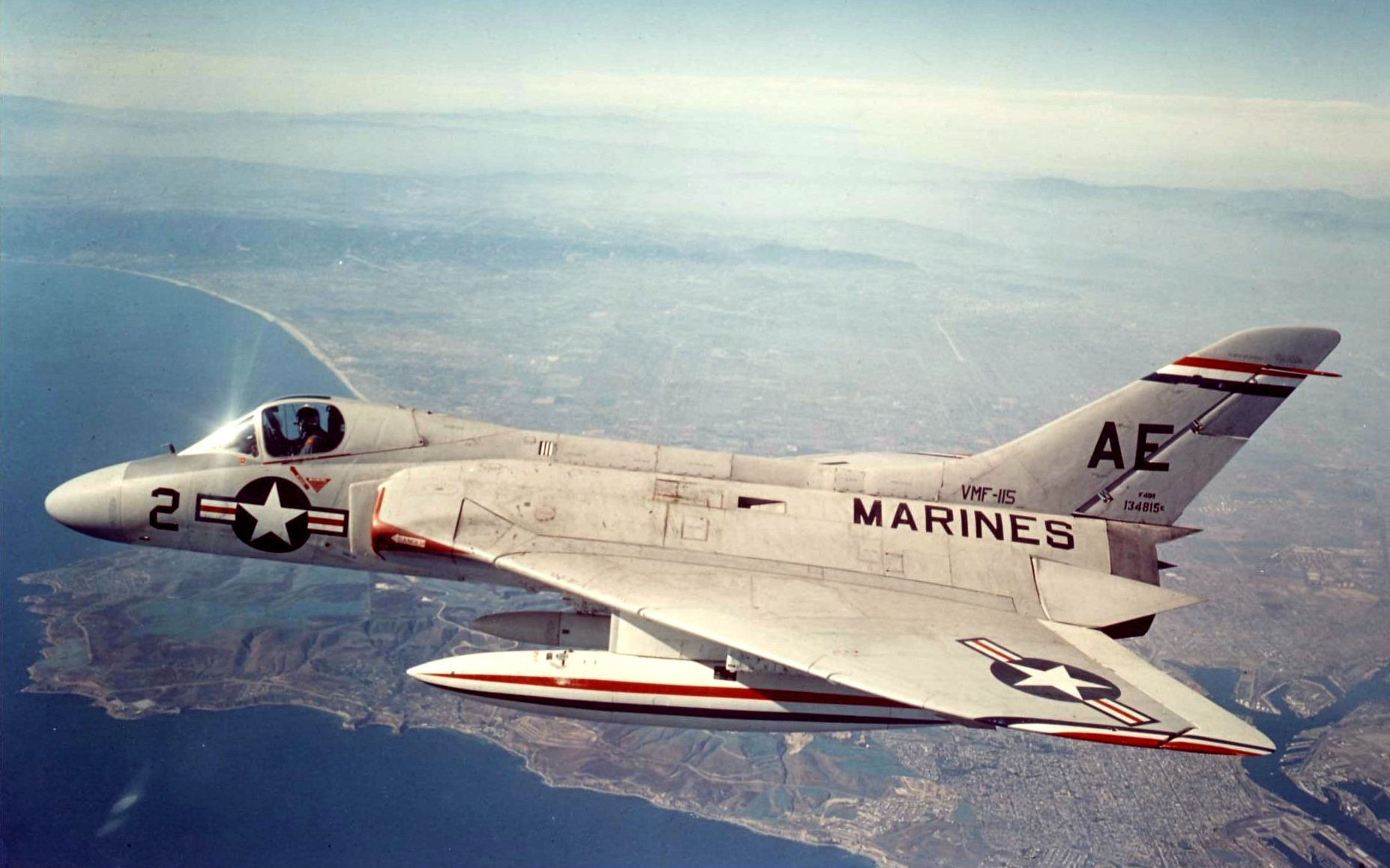
A Douglas F4D-1 Skyray of VMF(AW)-115.

In the spring of 1957, the squadron received the Marine Corps' first Douglas F4D-1 Skyrays were redesignated VMF(AW)-115 and deployed to MCAF Mojave for the next six months for testing. Between 1957 and 1964, the squadron was usually based at MCAS Cherry Point, North Carolina. From 19 April 1962 to 27 August 1962 the squadron was deployed aboard the aircraft carrier USS Independence (CVA-62) as part of Carrier Air Group Seven (CVG-7) to the Mediterranean Sea. From October 1962 to February 1963 the squadron was deployed to Naval Station Guantanamo Bay, Cuba in support of the Cuban Missile Crisis.

=== Vietnam War ===
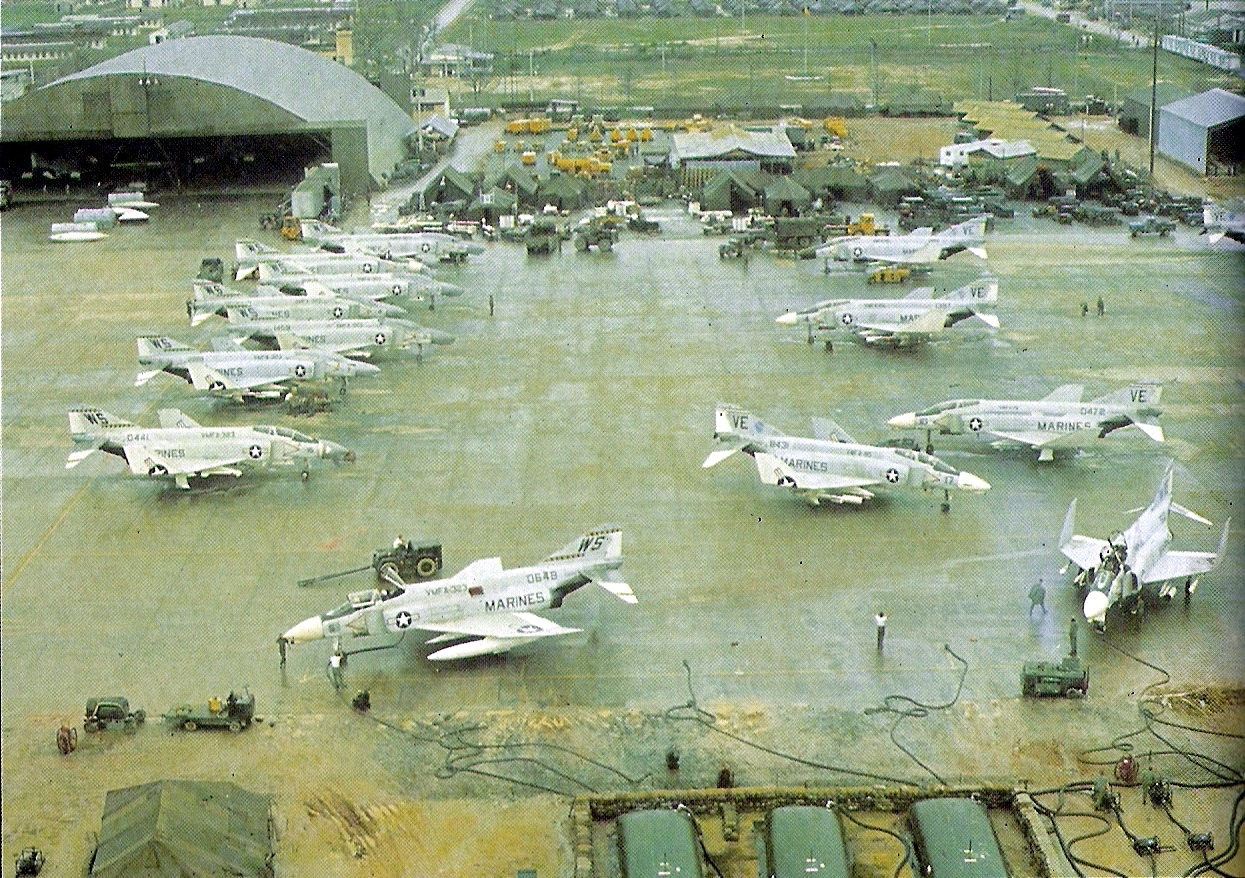
F-4B Phantoms of VMFA-115 and VMFA-323 on the flight-line at Da Nang in 1966.

In 1964/65, the squadron transitioned the McDonnell F-4B Phantom II and was redesignated VMFA-115. The "Able Eagles" were deployed to Da Nang Air Base, Republic of Vietnam on 14 October 1965. During the Vietnam War, VMFA-115 flew more than 34,000 combat sorties, providing close air support for Marines during such battles as the Tet Offensive, Battle of Hue, Battle of Khe Sahn, and Task Force Delta. The squadron was awarded the Hanson Trophy in 1971 by the Commandant of the Marine Corps. In March 1971 VMFA-115 was relocated to Iwakuni, Japan. On 6 April 1972 the squadron flew into Da Nang Air Base to support operations against the North Vietnamese Easter Offensive. On 16 July 1972 the squadron moved its operations to Royal Thai Air Base Nam Phong, Thailand and began flying combat sorties the next day. The squadron continued to fly close air support sorties in addition to playing a key fighter role in Operation Linebacker missions over North Vietnam. For its efforts supporting operations in Vietnam, VMFA-115 was awarded the Marine Corps Aviation Association's Robert M. Hanson Award as the top fighter attack squadron in the Marine Corps for 1972.

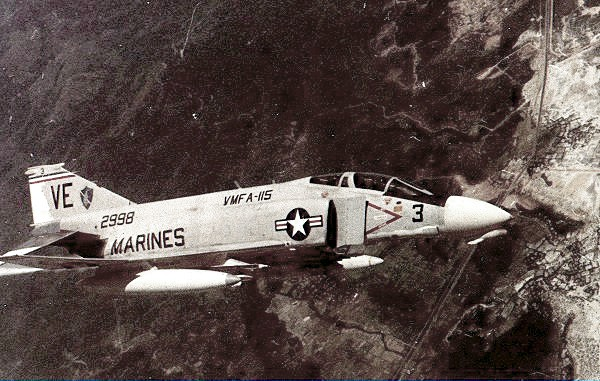
VMFA-115 F-4B Phantom II over Vietnam in 1969

=== Post Vietnam ===
In July 1977, VMFA-115 relocated to MCAS Beaufort, South Carolina, and in October 1980 joined Carrier Air Wing 17 (CVW-17) aboard the USS Forrestal (CVA-59). During this cruise VMFA-115 participated in Cold War missions such as intercepting and escorting various Soviet aircraft.

After flying Phantoms for more than 20 years, VMFA-115 began the transition to the F/A-18A Hornet on 1 January 1985, and officially stood up with 14 aircraft on 16 August 1985. The following year, the squadron became officially known as the "Silver Eagles".

In July 1987, VMFA-115 returned to the Western Pacific to participate in the Unit Deployment Program (UDP) at Marine Corps Air Station Iwakuni, Japan. The squadron was recognized for superior maintenance, receiving the Secretary of Defense Phoenix Award for Maintenance Excellence, and earned the Hanson Award as Marine Corps Fighter Squadron of the Year for both 1987 and 1988. This was the first time a Marine Fighter Squadron had won the Hanson Award two consecutive years.

In 1989, VMFA-115 returned to the Philippines and supported government forces during a coup attempt there. The squadron flew armed combat air patrol and escort missions, helping to stabilize the situation. The squadron’s efforts were recognized again as the coveted Hanson Award became a “Silver Eagle” possession in 1990 for the third time in four years. During the years from 1991 to 2000, the “Silver Eagles” conducted numerous six-month deployments in support of the 1st Marine Aircraft Wing as part of the Western Pacific Unit Deployment Program (UDP).

=== Global War on Terrorism ===
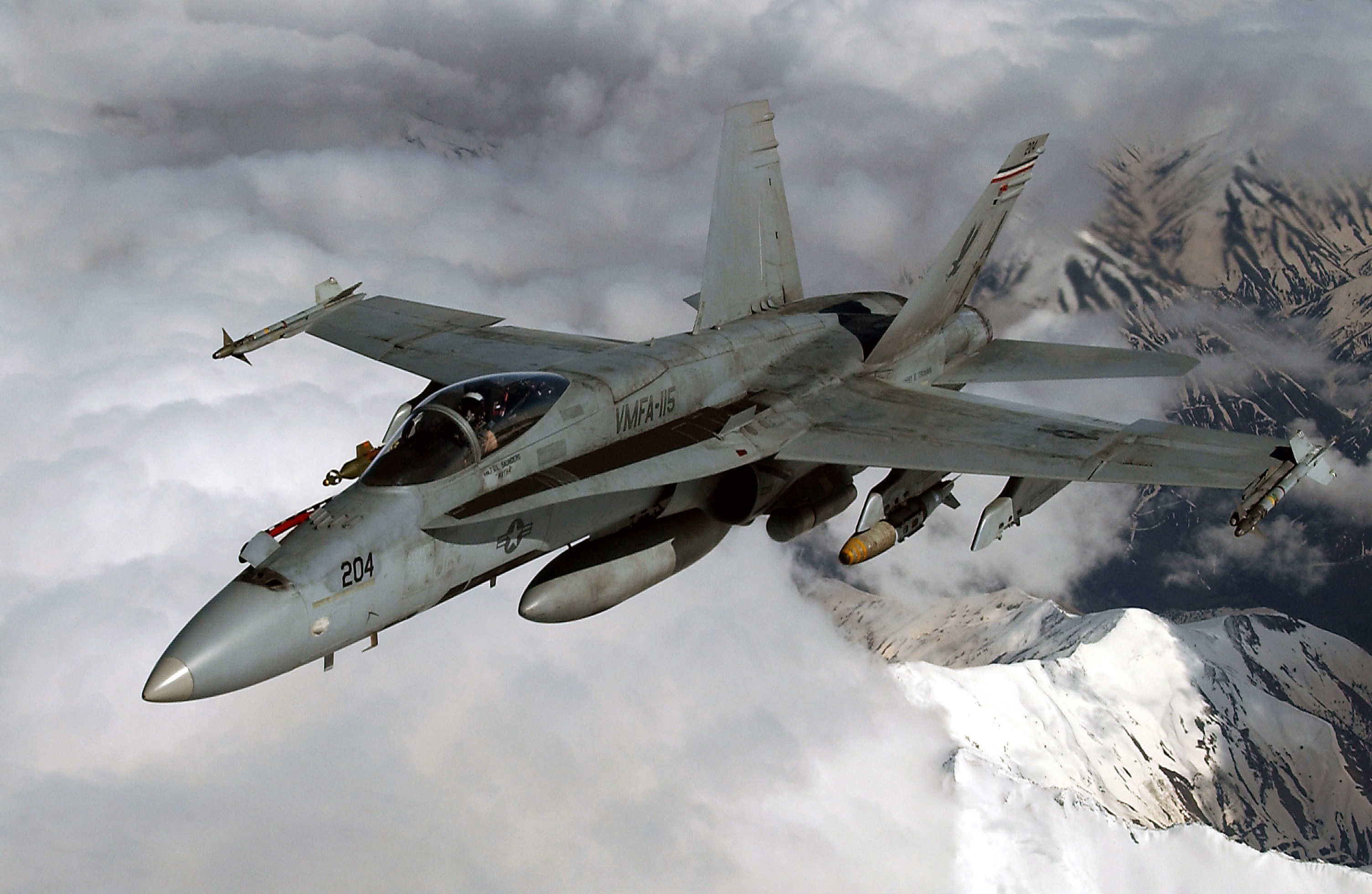
An F/A-18 Hornet from VMFA-115 flying over Iraq in 2003

Nearing the end of 2001, the squadron was once again designated a carrier squadron. This coincided with the first delivery of the F/A-18A+ aircraft modification. After qualifying all personnel for carrier operations the squadron deployed with Carrier Air Wing 3 (CVW-3) aboard USS Harry S. Truman in October 2002. In March 2003, the Silver Eagles fought against Iraqi forces as part of Operation Iraqi Freedom, delivering more than 150 tons of ordnance. In October 2004, the squadron again deployed with CVW-3 aboard Truman for Operation Iraqi Freedom, providing close air support and overhead security in support of Iraq’s historic democratic elections.

In July 2006, VMFA-115 returned to the Western Pacific for the first time since 2000 to serve under 1st MAW/III Marine Expeditionary Force for a UDP deployment. The Silver Eagles flew training sorties at various locations in Japan and squadron Marines also spent a month at Osan Air Base in South Korea.

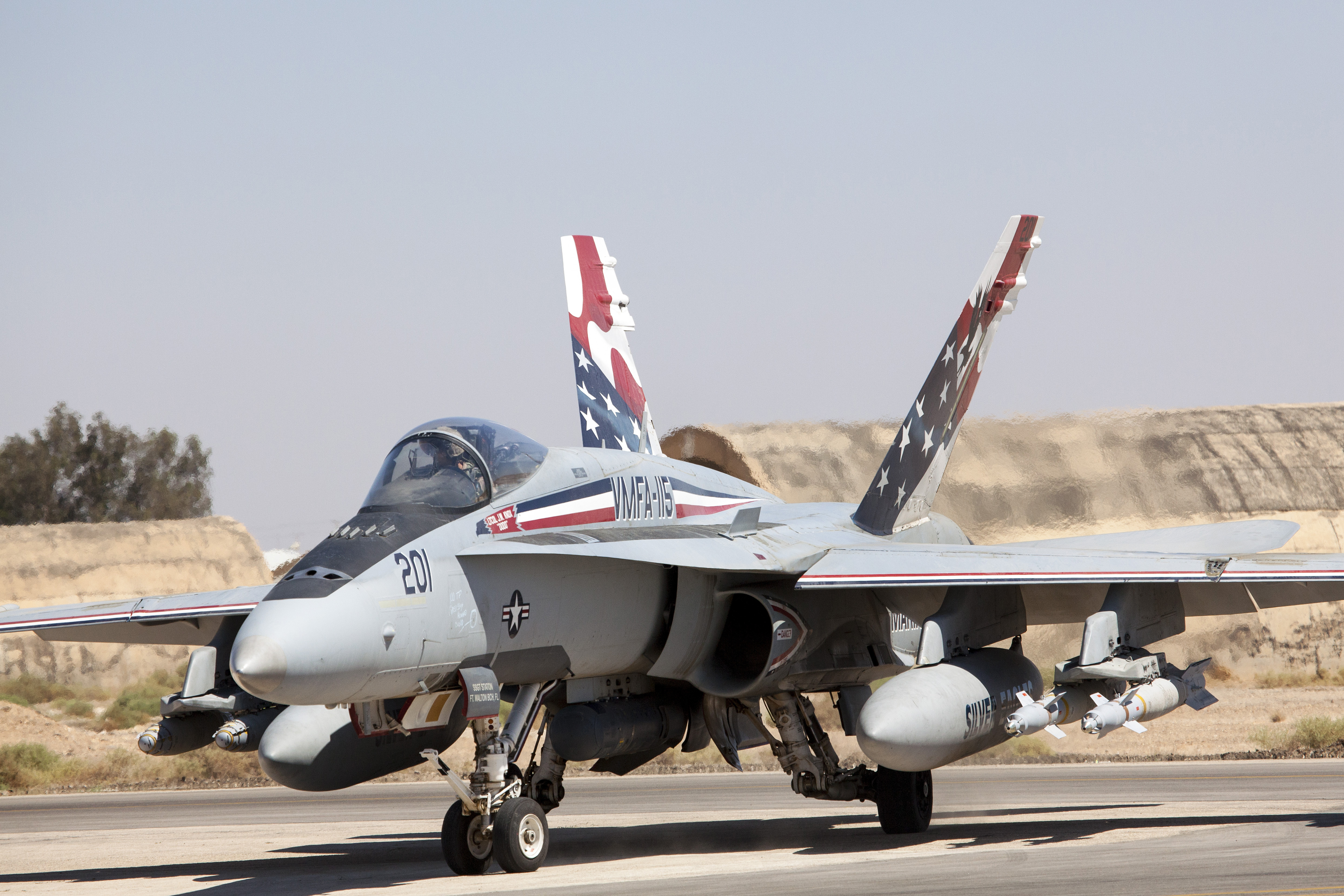
VMFA-115 F/A-18 in Jordan in 2011

In February 2008, VMFA-115 deployed to Al Asad Airbase, Iraq in support of Operation Iraqi Freedom (OIF) where they were the Marine Corps’ first forward-air-controller capable, single-seat F/A-18 Hornet squadron to deploy to Al Asad. The Squadron returned to MCAS Beaufort on 17 September 2008. In September 2009, the squadron transferred to Marine Aircraft Group 12 as part of the Unit Deployment Program at MCAS Iwakuni with a full complement of twelve F/A-18A+ Hornets. They returned to the States on 1 March 2010 after a seven-month deployment where they supported operations in Okinawa, Thailand, Korea the Philippines and Brunei. In 2013, they deployed to Isa Air Base, Bahrain, from March until October, returning to MCAS Beaufort upon completion. They once again transferred to Marine Aircraft Group 12, MCAS Iwakuni, Japan under the Unit Deployment Program from July through December, 2014.

From September 2016 to March 2017 the Silver Eagles deployed again to MCAS Iwakuni Japan as part of the unit deployment program. On 7 December 2016 an FA-18C+ of the squadron crashed into the sea off Okinawa. The pilot, Captain Jake Fredrick, ejected but did not survive. His body was recovered by the Japan Maritime Self-Defense Force.

In 2018, the Silver Eagles flew in support of Operation INHERENT RESOLVE.

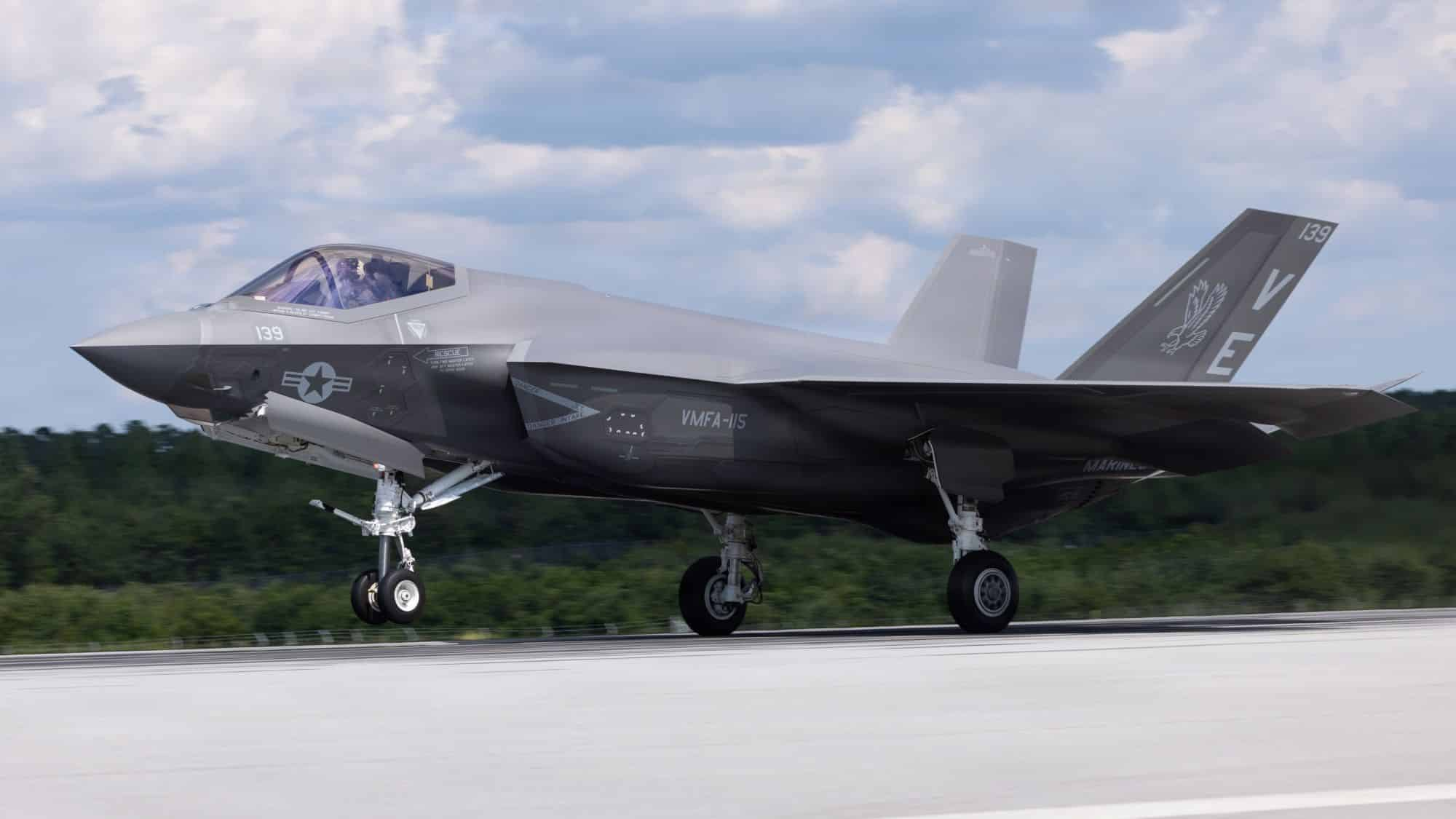
VMFA-115 F-35C Lightning II lands at Marine Corps Air Station Cherry Point in 2026

From March to September 2020, VMFA-115 deployed to MCAS Iwakuni, Japan enduring severe operational restraints due to the COVID-19 epidemic.

In December 2021, the squadron was deployed on short notice to Prince Sultan Air Base Saudi Arabia to reinforce CENTCOM objectives. The squadron was extended from the original 45 day dynamic force employment program through March 2022. During this time the Silver Eagles flew in support of Operation INHERENT RESOLVE, while supporting regional partnership and deterrence efforts.

From March to October 2023, VMFA-115 executed their last deployment as an F/A-18 squadron, deploying with seven F/A-18Cs and five F/A-18Ds. On 9 November 2023, the squadron deactivated from MAG-31 with plans to reactivate at MCAS Cherry Point as an F-35C squadron under MAG-14 in the coming few years.

In July 2026, VMFA-115 completed its first flight in the F-35C at MCAS Cherry Point. In November 2026, VMFA-115 officially reactivated as the Marine Corps newest F-35C squadron on the east coast at MCAS Cherry Point.

== Unit Awards ==
- Presidential Unit Citation Streamer with two Bronze Stars
- Navy Unit Commendation Streamer with one Silver Star and one Bronze Star
- Meritorious Unit Commendation Streamer with four Bronze Stars
- China Service Streamer
- Asiatic/Pacific Campaign Streamer with one Silver Star
- World War II Victory Streamer
- National Defense Service Streamer with three Bronze Stars
- Korean Service Streamer with four Bronze Stars
- Armed Forces Expeditionary Streamer with two Bronze Stars
- Vietnam Service Streamer with two Silver and four Bronze Stars
- Global War on Terror Expeditionary Streamer
- Global War on Terror Service Streamer
- Armed Forces Service Streamer
- Philippine Liberation Streamer with two Bronze Stars
- Philippine Presidential Unit Citation Streamer
- Korean Presidential Unit Citation Streamer
- Vietnam Cross of Gallantry with Palm Streamer
- Vietnam Meritorious Unit Citation Civil Actions Streamer

== See also ==
- United States Marine Corps Aviation
- Organization of the United States Marine Corps
- List of active United States Marine Corps aircraft squadrons
