= Andrew J. Rommeriam =

American politician from South Dakota

Andrew Joseph Rommeriam (March 15, 1851 – February 1, 1926) was an American politician who served as a member of the South Dakota House of Representatives. He was the maternal grandfather of South Dakota Governor, Archibald Maxwell Gubbrud.

Andrew Rommeriam was born and educated in Bergen, Norway. In 1871, he came to the United States and settled in Minnesota before moving to Lincoln County, Dakota Territory. In 1875, Rommeriam returned to Norway, where he married Anna Dyrkollbotten and became the father of thirteen children. In 1910 and 1912, Rommeriam was elected to represent Lincoln County in the South Dakota House of Representatives after serving in a number of local offices.
