= John F. Lindley =

American politician

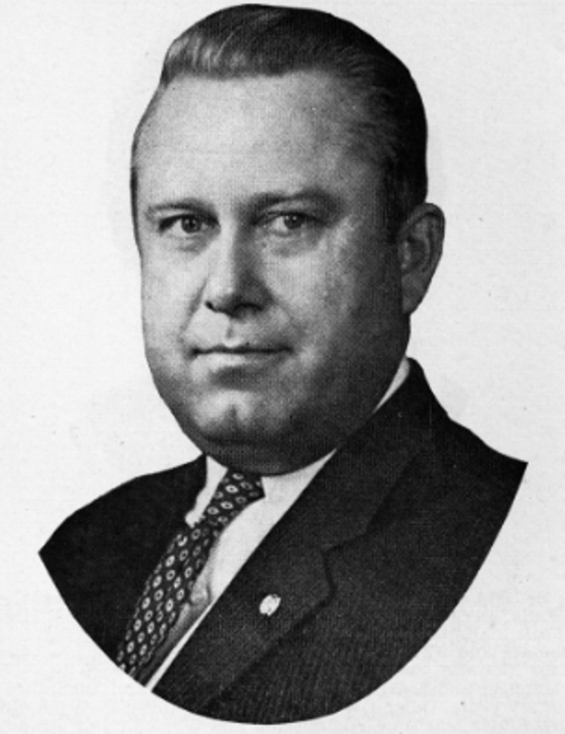

Lieutenant Governor of South Dakota
- In office 1959–1961
- Governor: Ralph Herseth
- Preceded by: L. Roy Houck
- Succeeded by: Joe Bottum

Personal details
- Born: August 29, 1918 Near Reliance, South Dakota
- Died: April 23, 1971 (aged 52) Chamberlain, South Dakota
- Party: Democratic
- Education: Dakota Wesleyan University; University of South Dakota School of Law

John Frank Lindley (August 29, 1918 – April 23, 1971) was an American attorney and politician. He served in the South Dakota House of Representatives and as Lieutenant Governor of South Dakota.

Lindley was born on a farm northeast of Reliance, South Dakota. His father, William, served in the South Dakota Legislature. Lindley graduated from Dakota Wesleyan University in 1938 and enlisted in the United States Army in 1941. While serving overseas in World War II, Lindley earned a Purple Heart. He graduated from University of South Dakota School of Law in 1948. In 1952, he married and he and his wife had four children (one from her previous marriage). He was also state's attorney from Brule County, South Dakota, from 1953 through 1957.

Lindley served in the South Dakota House of Representatives in 1951. He ran for Lieutenant Governor of South Dakota in the 1956 election, winning the Democratic Party nomination. He lost to L. Roy Houck, the incumbent. He ran again in 1958, and won, defeating Alex Olson, a former state legislator. Lindley lost reelection in 1960 to Joseph H. Bottum. Lindley won the Democratic Party nomination for governor of South Dakota in the 1964 election, defeating Merton B. Tice, a municipal judge. He lost in the general election to Republican Nils Boe.

Lindley died of an apparent heart attack at his home on April 23, 1971.

Party political offices
Preceded by J. M. Magness	Democratic nominee for Lieutenant Governor of South Dakota; 1956, 1958, 1960	Succeeded by Mike Schirmer
Preceded by Ralph Herseth	Democratic nominee for Governor of South Dakota; 1964	Succeeded by Robert Chamberlin
