= Triple U Buffalo Ranch =

Coordinates: 44°34′57″N 100°51′10″W

The Triple U Buffalo Ranch is a 50,000-acre (20,000 ha) ranch in northern Stanley County, South Dakota. Formerly known as Standing Butte Ranch, it was used for location shooting in the 1990 movie Dances With Wolves and TNT's 1994 film Lakota Woman: Siege at Wounded Knee. The ranch runs a closed herd of about 2,000 bison and offers trophy hunts for bison as well as several other indigenous species.

The ranch was owned by L. Roy Houck. Ted Turner purchased the ranch in 2015.
