= 1962 United States elections =

- ← 1960 1961 1962 1963 1964 → Midterm elections
- Election day: November 6
- Incumbent president: ▌John F. Kennedy (D)
- Next Congress: 88th

Senate elections
- Overall control: Democratic hold
- Seats contested: 39 of 100 seats (34 Class 3 seats + 5 special elections)
- Net seat change: Democratic +4
- 1962 Senate election results Democratic gain Democratic hold Republican gain Republican hold

House elections
- Overall control: Democratic hold
- Seats contested: All 435 voting seats
- Popular vote margin: Democratic +5.3%
- Net seat change: Republican +4
- 1962 House election results Democratic gain Democratic hold Republican gain Republican hold

Gubernatorial elections
- Seats contested: 35
- Net seat change: 0
- 1962 gubernatorial election results Democratic gain Democratic hold Republican gain Republican hold

Elections were held on November 6, 1962 to elect the members of the 88th United States Congress. The election occurred in the middle of Democratic President John F. Kennedy's term. The Republican Party gained a seat in the House of Representatives. Still, the Democrats retained strong majorities in both houses of Congress.

In the Senate, Democrats won a net gain of four seats from the Republicans, maintaining control of the Senate. In the House of Representatives, Republicans picked up a seat from the Democrats but were short of winning a majority in the chamber; the Democrats won the national popular vote by a margin of 5.3 percentage points. In the gubernatorial elections, neither party won a net gain of seats, Democrats won the most governorships. Notably, 1960 Republican presidential nominee Richard Nixon lost the California gubernatorial election, which many analysts, as well as Nixon himself, incorrectly predicted to be the end of his political career.

This was the first time since 1914 that the president's party had a net gain in the Senate and lost seats in the House; this would occur again in 1970, 2018, and 2022. This would be the last time until 2022 that the Democrats achieved a net Senate gain in a midterm during which they held the Presidency, and like in that election, they gained Senate seats while losing House seats.

After failing to pass his New Frontier programs in the face of the powerful conservative coalition, Kennedy's victory in this election helped bolster his presidency. Republicans campaigned on Kennedy's handling of the Cuban Missile Crisis, and the end of the crisis shortly before the election helped the Democrats avoid the typical midterm losses. The election also saw the Republicans pick up several House seats in the South for the first time in the Fifth Party System. The GOP would later build on these inroads with Nixon's Southern strategy. The ranks of liberal Democrats were bolstered in this election, allowing for the passage of the Clean Air Act, the Civil Rights Act of 1964, and other programs.

== See also ==
- 1962 United States House of Representatives elections
- 1962 United States Senate elections
- 1962 United States gubernatorial elections
