= 1956 South Dakota gubernatorial election =

- November 6, 1956
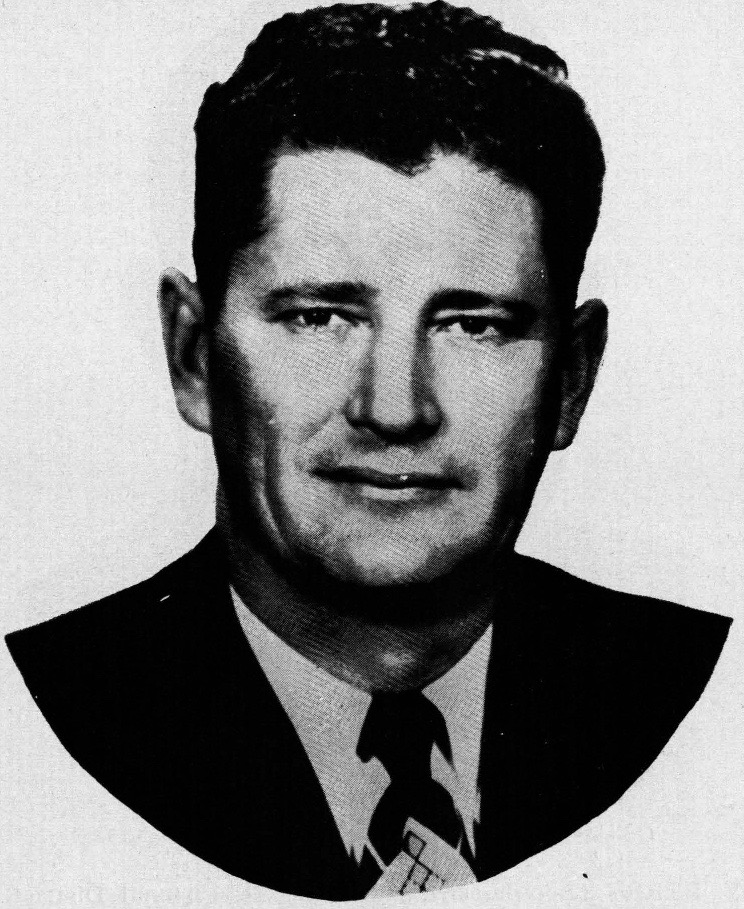

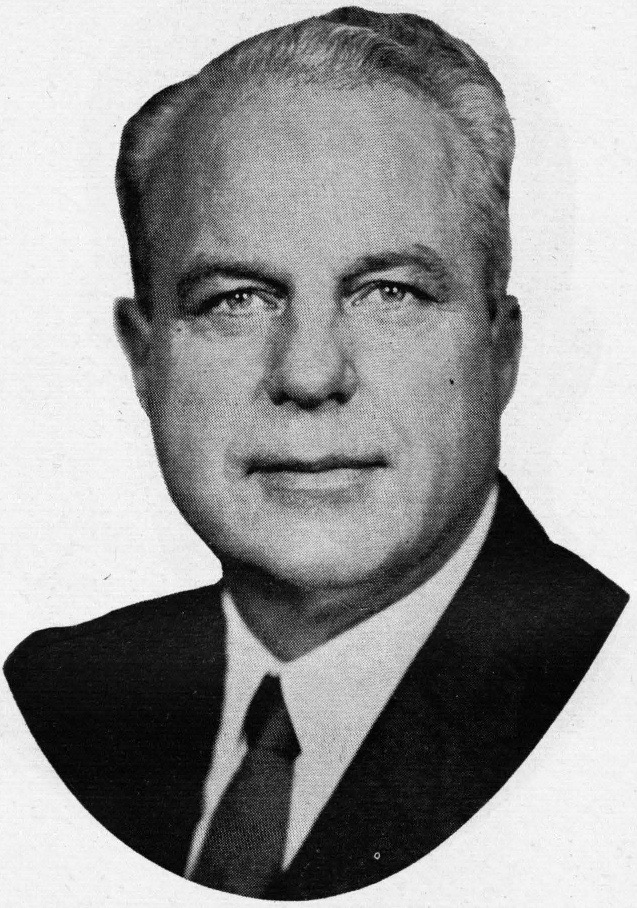
Nominee	Joe Foss	Ralph Herseth
Party	Republican	Democratic
Popular vote	158,819	133,198
Percentage	54.39%	45.61%
- County results Foss: 50–60% 60–70% 70–80% 80–90% Herseth: 50–60% 60–70%
Governor before election
Joe Foss
Republican
Elected Governor
Joe Foss
Republican

The 1956 South Dakota gubernatorial election was held on November 6, 1956.

Incumbent Republican Governor Joe Foss defeated Democratic nominee Ralph Herseth with 54.39% of the vote.

== Primary elections ==
Primary elections were held on June 5, 1956.

=== Democratic primary ===
==== Candidates ====
- Ralph Herseth, former State Senator

==== Results ====
Democratic primary results
Party	Candidate	Votes	%
Democratic	Ralph Herseth		unopposed

=== Republican primary ===
==== Candidates ====
- Joe Foss, incumbent Governor

==== Results ====
Republican primary results
Party	Candidate	Votes	%
Republican	Joe Foss (inc.)		unopposed

== General election ==
=== Candidates ===
- Ralph Herseth, Democratic
- Joe Foss, Republican

=== Results ===
1956 South Dakota gubernatorial election
Party	Candidate	Votes	%	±%
Republican	Joe Foss (inc.)	158,819	54.39%	
Democratic	Ralph Herseth	133,198	45.61%	
Majority		25,621	8.77%	
Turnout		292,017	100.00%	
Republican hold		Swing		

== Bibliography ==
- Gubernatorial Elections, 1787-1997. Washington, D.C.: Congressional Quarterly Inc. 1998. ISBN 1-56802-396-0.
