= Ralph Herseth =

American politician

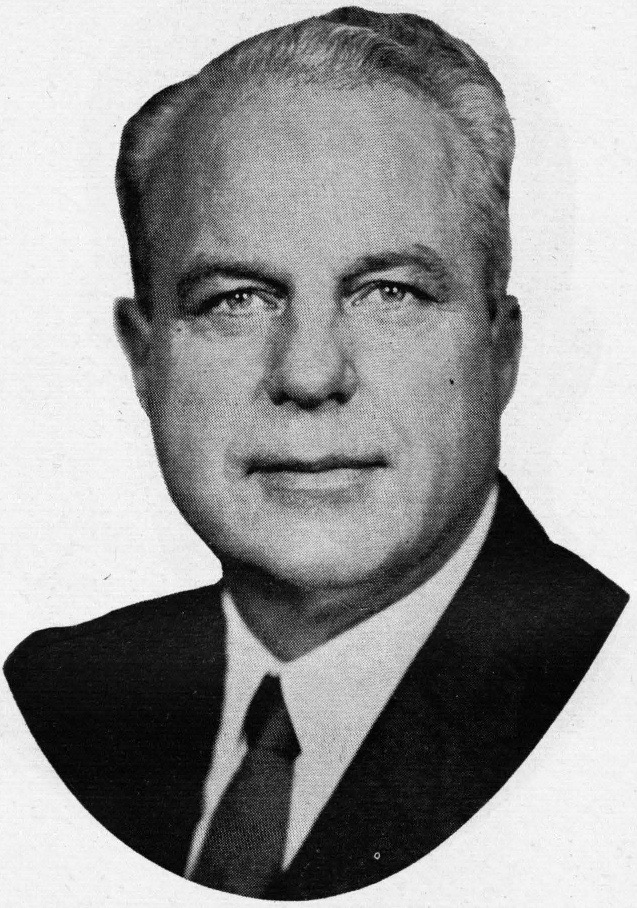

21st Governor of South Dakota
- In office January 6, 1959 – January 3, 1961
- Lieutenant: John F. Lindley
- Preceded by: Joe Foss
- Succeeded by: Archie M. Gubbrud

Member of the South Dakota Senate from the Brown County district
- In office 1951–1952
- In office 1957–1958

Personal details
- Born: July 2, 1909 near Houghton, South Dakota, U.S.
- Died: January 24, 1969 (aged 59) Aberdeen, South Dakota, U.S.
- Party: Democratic
- Spouse: Lorna Buntrock
- Education: North Dakota State University
- Profession: Farmer

Ralph E. Herseth (July 2, 1909 – January 24, 1969) was the 21st governor of South Dakota from January 6, 1959, to January 3, 1961. He was a Democrat and was the patriarch of the prominent Herseth family of South Dakota.

== Early life and education ==
Herseth was born in 1909 on a ranch near Houghton, South Dakota, the son of Oline (née Afseth) and Lars Herseth. His father was a Norwegian immigrant, as were his maternal grandparents. He graduated from Columbia High School, in Brown County, South Dakota. He attended Northern State Teachers College and North Dakota State College. He married Lorna H. Buntrock on December 23, 1937, and they lived on a ranch near Houghton. Lorna Herseth later became South Dakota's Secretary of State. Their son Lars Herseth was Majority Leader of the State Senate, and granddaughter Stephanie Herseth Sandlin served in the U.S. House of Representatives from 2004 until 2011.

== Political career ==
Herseth was a Superintendent for the Civilian Conservation Corps (1935–39). He served in the South Dakota State Senate for Brown County from (1951–52) and (1957–58).

Herseth was only the third Democrat to hold the office of Governor of the state of South Dakota. As governor, he focused on state tax problems, appointing a Citizens Tax Study Commission to recommend tax reform. He was also active in developing South Dakota's natural resources. Big Bend Dam on the Missouri River was begun during his single term in office. The state government experienced problems resulting from hard-hitting natural disasters in South Dakota in 1959; he was defeated for reelection in 1960, and for a return to office in 1962.

== Death ==
Herseth, died from a heart attack on January 24, 1969, aged 59, while visiting a friend at home in Aberdeen, South Dakota. He had a history of heart problems, having previously suffered a heart attack in 1960. He is interred at Houghton Cemetery, Houghton, Brown County, South Dakota US.

Party political offices
Preceded by Ed C. Martin	Democratic nominee for Governor of South Dakota; 1956, 1958, 1960, 1962	Succeeded by John F. Lindley
Political offices
Preceded by Joe Foss	Governor of South Dakota; January 6, 1959 – January 3, 1961	Succeeded by Archie M. Gubbrud
