= Lem Overpeck =

American politician

Lem Overpeck (September 18, 1911 – April 10, 2003) was the 29th Lieutenant Governor of South Dakota from 1965 to 1969 serving under Governor Nils Boe. He was a member of the Republican Party.

== Biography ==
He was born in Belle Fourche, South Dakota and received his LL.B. degree from the University of South Dakota in 1936. He practiced law in Belle Fourche and served in World War II in the United States Naval Reserve. He married Helen Brewer and they had four children.

He served as the State's Attorney for Butte County, South Dakota, for four terms and served six years on the Board of Regents. He was elected to the State Senate of the South Dakota Legislature in 1962 and Lieutenant Governor in 1964 and 1966.

He was a member of the Episcopal Church, Masons and Elks.

== Notes ==
Party political offices
Preceded by Nils Boe	Republican nominee for Lieutenant Governor of South Dakota; 1964, 1966	Succeeded by James Abdnor
Political offices
Preceded by Nils Boe	Lieutenant Governor of South Dakota; 1965–1969	Succeeded by James Abdnor
