= 1954 South Dakota gubernatorial election =

- November 2, 1954
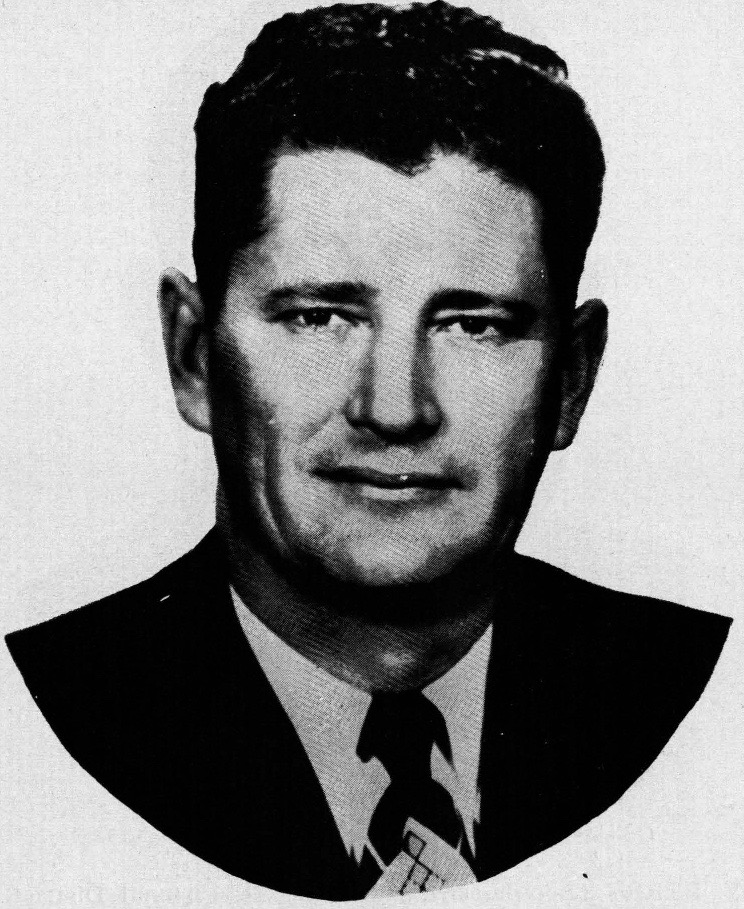

Nominee	Joe Foss	Ed C. Martin
Party	Republican	Democratic
Popular vote	133,878	102,377
Percentage	56.67%	43.33%
- County results Foss: 50–60% 60–70% 70–80% Martin: 50–60% 60–70%
Governor before election
Sigurd Anderson
Republican
Elected Governor
Joe Foss
Republican

The 1954 South Dakota gubernatorial election was held on November 2, 1954.

Incumbent Republican Governor Sigurd Anderson was term-limited.

Republican nominee Joe Foss defeated Democratic nominee Ed C. Martin with 56.67% of the vote.

== Primary elections ==
Primary elections were held on June 1, 1954.

=== Democratic primary ===
==== Candidates ====
- Ernest F. McKellips, former mayor of Alcester
- Ed C. Martin, rancher

==== Results ====
Democratic primary results
Party	Candidate	Votes	%
Democratic	Ed C. Martin	16,383	53.44
Democratic	Ernest F. McKellips	14,276	46.56
Total votes		30,659	100.00

=== Republican primary ===
==== Candidates ====
- Joe Foss, unsuccessful candidate for Republican nomination for Governor in 1950
- Harold O. Lund, Chairman of the Board of Charities and Corrections
- Rex Terry, incumbent Lieutenant Governor

==== Results ====
Republican primary results
Party	Candidate	Votes	%
Republican	Joe Foss	55,272	53.65
Republican	Rex Terry	26,163	25.40
Republican	Harold O. Lund	21,585	20.95
Total votes		103,020	100.00

== General election ==
=== Candidates ===
- Ed C. Martin, Democratic
- Joe Foss, Republican

=== Results ===
1954 South Dakota gubernatorial election
Party	Candidate	Votes	%	±%
Republican	Joe Foss	133,878	56.67%	
Democratic	Ed C. Martin	102,377	43.33%	
Majority		31,501	13.33%	
Turnout		236,255	100.00%	
Republican hold		Swing		

== Bibliography ==
- Gubernatorial Elections, 1787-1997. Washington, D.C.: Congressional Quarterly Inc. 1998. ISBN 1-56802-396-0.
