= Black Hills Airport =

Airport in South Dakota, United States

Black Hills Airport Clyde Ice Field
- IATA: SPF; ICAO: KSPF; FAA LID: SPF

Summary
- Airport type: Public
- Owner: Lawrence County Airport Board
- Location: Spearfish, South Dakota
- Elevation AMSL: 3,933 ft (1,199 m)
- Coordinates: 44°28′49″N 103°46′59″W

Map
- Location of airport in South Dakota SPF (the United States)

Runways
Direction	Length		Surface
Direction	ft	m	Surface
13/31	6,401	1,951	Asphalt
8/26	4,003	1,220	Turf
4/22	1,995	608	Turf

Statistics (2022)
- Aircraft operations (year ending 5/11/2022): 17,000
- Based aircraft: 71
- Source: Federal Aviation Administration

Black Hills Airport (IATA: SPF, ICAO: KSPF, FAA LID: SPF) (Clyde Ice Field) is a public airport three miles (5 km) east of Spearfish, in Lawrence County, South Dakota.

Western Airlines served Spearfish from 1949-50 until 1959.

== Facilities ==
The airport covers 485 acres (196 ha); its paved runway, 13/31, is 6,401 x 75 ft (1,951 x 23 m) asphalt. It has two grass runways: 8/26 is 4,003 x 100 ft (1,220 x 30 m), and 4/22 is 1,995 x 120 ft (608 x 37 m).

In the year ending May 11, 2022 the airport had 17,000 aircraft operations, average 47 per day: 89% general aviation, 7% air taxi and 5% military. 71 aircraft were then based at this airport: 65 single-engine, 4 multi-engine, 1 helicopter, and 1 glider.

== See also ==
- List of airports in South Dakota
