= Joe Foss High School (Sioux Falls, South Dakota) =

Coordinates: 43.548356°N 96.747925°W

Location
- 201 N. West Avenue; Sioux Falls, South Dakota 57104

Information
- Motto: Focus. Fortitude. Finish!
- School district: Sioux Falls School District
- Principal: Tyler Engelson
- Grades: 9-12
- Enrolment: 326

Joe Foss High School is an alternative school located in Sioux Falls, South Dakota. In September 2015, the original building was sold to a religious group for $600,000, and the classes were moved to the former building of Axtell Park Middle School. The high school is operated alongside multiple other at-risk programs in the building, such as programs for middle school students, and suspensions from other schools in the district.
