= Archie M. Gubbrud =

American politician

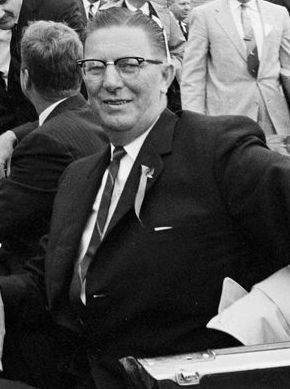
- Gubbrud in 1962

22nd Governor of South Dakota
- In office January 3, 1961 – January 5, 1965
- Lieutenant: Joe Bottum; Nils Boe
- Preceded by: Ralph Herseth
- Succeeded by: Nils Boe

Personal details
- Born: Archibald Maxwell Gubbrud; December 31, 1910 Norway Township, Lincoln County, South Dakota, U.S.
- Died: April 26, 1987 (aged 76) Sioux Falls, South Dakota, U.S.
- Party: Republican
- Spouse: Florence Maxine Dexter (1939–1987)
- Children: 2
- Occupation: farmer

Archibald Maxwell Gubbrud (December 31, 1910 – April 26, 1987) was an American politician who served as the 22nd governor of South Dakota.

== Early life ==
Gubbrud was born in Norway Township in Lincoln County, South Dakota. He was one of four children born to Torval Marius and Ella (Rommeriam) Gubbrud. From 1911 to 1914, Gubbrud's grandfather Andrew Rommeriam had served in the South Dakota House of Representatives and had been a friend of South Dakota governor Peter Norbeck. In 1929, Gubbrud graduated from Augustana Academy in Canton, South Dakota. After the death of his father in 1934, Gubbrud became responsible for the Gubbrud family farm and was quite successful at farming. He married Florence Dexter and they had two children.

== Career ==
His political career started that same year when he became Norway Township clerk. From 1947 to 1952, Gubbrud served as chairman of Elmwood School. In 1948, he was the Lincoln County delegate to the South Dakota state Republican convention. In 1950, Gubbrud was elected to the South Dakota House of Representatives. In 1951, he won the Mississippi Valley Association Soil Conservation Award for South Dakota. He served as Speaker of the South Dakota House of Representatives from 1959 to 1961, and was also the Chairman of the Legislative Research Council Executive Board at the same time.

=== Governorship and Senate campaign ===
In 1960, Gubbrud ran for Governor of South Dakota, beating the incumbent, Ralph Herseth, by 4,435 votes. In 1962, Gubbrud was elected for a second term when he beat Ralph Herseth by 31,244 votes. During his tenure he doubled aid to education. The Custer State Hospital and state budget office were also started with his recommendation. In 1965, Gubbrud left office and returned to the Gubbrud family farm seven and a half miles northeast of Alcester, South Dakota. In 1968, Gubbrud reluctantly ran for the office of United States Senator after being urged to do so by the Republicans but was beat by the incumbent, Senator George McGovern.

In 1969, President Richard Nixon appointed Gubbrud as state director of the Farmers Home Administration; he held that position until 1977.

== Death ==
Gubbrud returned to the Gubbrud farm and remained there until the time of his death from lung cancer; he died at McKennan Hospital in Sioux Falls, South Dakota, aged 76. He was interred in Lands Lutheran Church cemetery.

Party political offices
Preceded by Phil Saunders	Republican nominee for Governor of South Dakota; 1960, 1962	Succeeded by Nils Boe
Preceded by Joseph H. Bottum	Republican nominee for U.S. Senator from South Dakota (Class 3); 1968	Succeeded by Leo K. Thorsness
Political offices
Preceded by Ralph Herseth	Governor of South Dakota; 1961–1965	Succeeded by Nils Boe
