= Nils Boe =

American politician and judge (1913–1992)

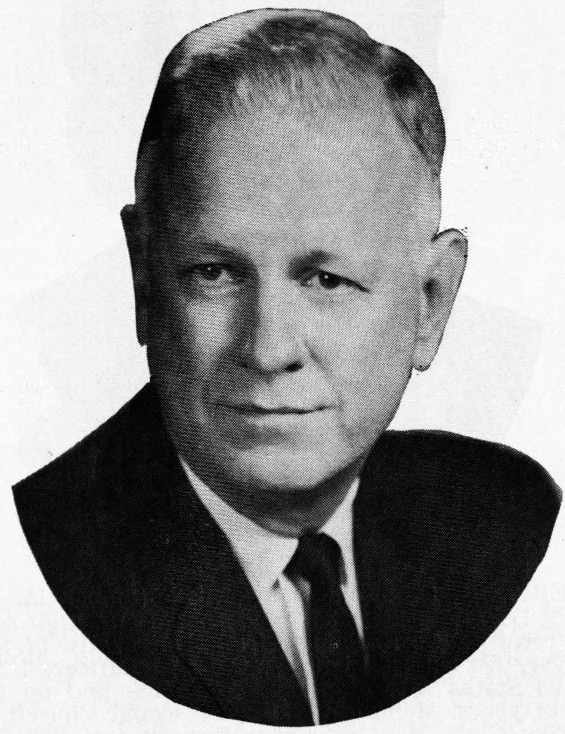

Senior Judge of the United States Court of International Trade
- In office April 30, 1984 – July 30, 1992

Judge of the United States Court of International Trade
- In office November 1, 1980 – April 30, 1984
- Preceded by: Seat established
- Succeeded by: Nicholas Tsoucalas

Chief Judge of the United States Customs Court
- In office 1971–1977
- Preceded by: Paul Peter Rao
- Succeeded by: Edward D. Re

Judge of the United States Customs Court
- In office August 10, 1971 – November 1, 1980
- Appointed by: Richard Nixon
- Preceded by: Samuel Murray Rosenstein
- Succeeded by: Seat abolished

23rd Governor of South Dakota
- In office January 5, 1965 – January 7, 1969
- Lieutenant: Lem Overpeck
- Preceded by: Archie M. Gubbrud
- Succeeded by: Frank Farrar

28th Lieutenant Governor of South Dakota
- In office July 20, 1962 – January 5, 1965
- Governor: Archie M. Gubbrud
- Preceded by: Joe Bottum
- Succeeded by: Lem Overpeck

Personal details
- Born: Nils Andreas Boe; September 10, 1913 Baltic, South Dakota, U.S.
- Died: July 30, 1992 (aged 78) Sioux Falls, South Dakota, U.S.
- Party: Republican
- Education: University of Wisconsin, Madison (AB, LLB)

Nils Andreas Boe (September 10, 1913 – July 30, 1992) was an American attorney who served as the 23rd Governor of South Dakota from 1965 to 1969. He served as a judge of the United States Customs Court, later the United States Court of International Trade.

== Early life and education ==
Boe was born in Baltic in Minnehaha County, South Dakota. He was the youngest son of Lutheran minister Nils N. Boe (1861–1938) and Sissel Catherine Finseth (1874–1960), both immigrants from Norway. He received an Artium Baccalaureus degree in 1935 from the University of Wisconsin–Madison, where he was a member of the track team, and received a Bachelor of Laws in 1937 from the University of Wisconsin Law School. Boe served as a lieutenant in the United States Navy during World War II.

== Career ==
Boe was later elected to the state legislature representing Sioux Falls from 1953 to 1958. In 1962, following the state's primary elections, Lieutenant Governor Joseph H. Bottum was appointed by Governor Archie M. Gubbrud to the U.S. Senate to fill the vacancy caused by Francis H. Case's death. Bottum's appointment created both a vacancy in the lieutenant governorship and in the Republican nomination for Lieutenant Governor in the 1962 elections. At a state convention on July 16, 1962, Boe was named as the replacement lieutenant-gubernatorial nominee. Several days later, Governor Gubbrud appointed Boe to fill the vacancy in the lieutenant governorship, and Boe was sworn in on July 20. He was re-elected later that fall.

In 1964, when Governor Gubbrud declined to seek a third term, Boe ran to succeed him. Upon his victory, Boe, who was unmarried, was South Dakota's only bachelor governor. His sister, Borghild Marie Boe (1906-1994), served as the state's official hostess during his term in office.

The Boe administration improved the state's reservoir system, enacted a worker training program to attract new industry to South Dakota, increased state aid to schools, and created a retirement program for state employees. The administration also was noteworthy for advocating property tax cuts and starting the state's educational television system.

After leaving office, Boe was appointed by President Richard Nixon as the first director of the Office of Intergovernmental Affairs in the Executive Office of the President of the United States from 1969 to 1971.

== Federal Judicial Service ==
Boe was nominated by President Richard Nixon on July 28, 1971, to a seat on the United States Customs Court vacated by Judge Samuel Murray Rosenstein. He was confirmed by the United States Senate on August 6, 1971, and received his commission on August 10, 1971. He served as Chief Judge from 1971 to 1977. He was reassigned by operation of law on November 1, 1980, to the United States Court of International Trade, to a new seat authorized by 94 Stat. 1727. He assumed senior status on April 30, 1984. His service terminated on July 30, 1992, due to his death. He was succeeded by Judge Nicholas Tsoucalas.

== Death ==
Boe died of cancer on July 30, 1992, at Sioux Valley Hospital in Sioux Falls, South Dakota.

== Legacy ==
In 1971, members of the Boe family had established an endowment at Augustana College (now Augustana University) for the Center for Western Studies to support a non-partisan lecture series. Nils Boe is memorialized by The Boe Forum on Public Affairs conducted annually at Augustana University.

== Sources ==
Party political offices
Preceded by Joseph H. Bottum	Republican nominee for Lieutenant Governor of South Dakota; 1962	Succeeded by Lem Overpeck
Preceded by Archie M. Gubbrud	Republican nominee for Governor of South Dakota; 1964, 1966	Succeeded by Frank Farrar
Political offices
Preceded by Joseph H. Bottum	Lieutenant Governor of South Dakota; 1963–1965	Succeeded by Lem Overpeck
Preceded by Archie M. Gubbrud	Governor of South Dakota; 1965–1969	Succeeded by Frank Farrar
Legal offices
Preceded by Samuel Murray Rosenstein	Judge of the United States Customs Court; 1971–1980	Seat abolished
Preceded by Paul Peter Rao	Chief Judge of the United States Customs Court; 1971–1977	Succeeded by Edward D. Re
New seat	Judge of the United States Court of International Trade; 1980–1984	Succeeded by Nicholas Tsoucalas
