= 1962 South Dakota gubernatorial election =

- November 6, 1962
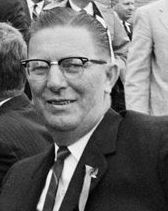

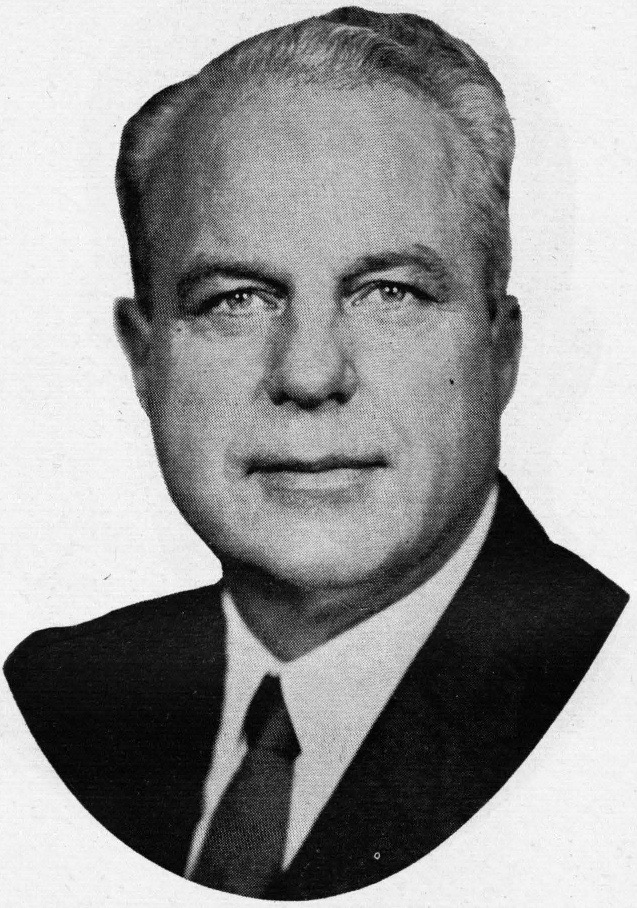
Nominee	Archie M. Gubbrud	Ralph Herseth
Party	Republican	Democratic
Popular vote	143,682	112,438
Percentage	56.10%	43.90%
- County results Gubbrud: 50–60% 60–70% 70–80% Herseth: 50–60% 60–70%
Governor before election
Archie M. Gubbrud
Republican
Elected Governor
Archie M. Gubbrud
Republican

The 1962 South Dakota gubernatorial election was held on November 6, 1962.

Incumbent Republican Governor Archie M. Gubbrud defeated Democratic nominee Ralph Herseth with 56.10% of the vote, in a rematch of the previous election.

== Primary elections ==
Primary elections were held on June 5, 1962.

=== Democratic primary ===
==== Candidates ====
- Ralph Herseth, former Governor

==== Results ====
Democratic primary results
Party	Candidate	Votes	%
Democratic	Ralph Herseth		unopposed

=== Republican primary ===
==== Candidates ====
- Archie M. Gubbrud, incumbent Governor

==== Results ====
Republican primary results
Party	Candidate	Votes	%
Republican	Archie M. Gubbrud (inc.)		unopposed

== General election ==
=== Candidates ===
- Ralph Herseth, Democratic
- Archie M. Gubbrud, Republican

=== Results ===
1962 South Dakota gubernatorial election
Party	Candidate	Votes	%	±%
Republican	Archie M. Gubbrud (inc.)	143,682	56.10%	
Democratic	Ralph Herseth	112,438	43.90%	
Majority		31,244	12.20%	
Turnout		256,120	100.00%	
Republican hold		Swing		

== Bibliography ==
- Gubernatorial Elections, 1787-1997. Washington, D.C.: Congressional Quarterly Inc. 1998. ISBN 1-56802-396-0.
- Scammon, Richard M., ed. (1964). America Votes 5: a handbook of contemporary American election statistics, 1962. Washington, D.C.: Governmental Affairs Institute.
