= 1960 South Dakota gubernatorial election =

- November 8, 1960
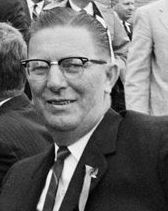

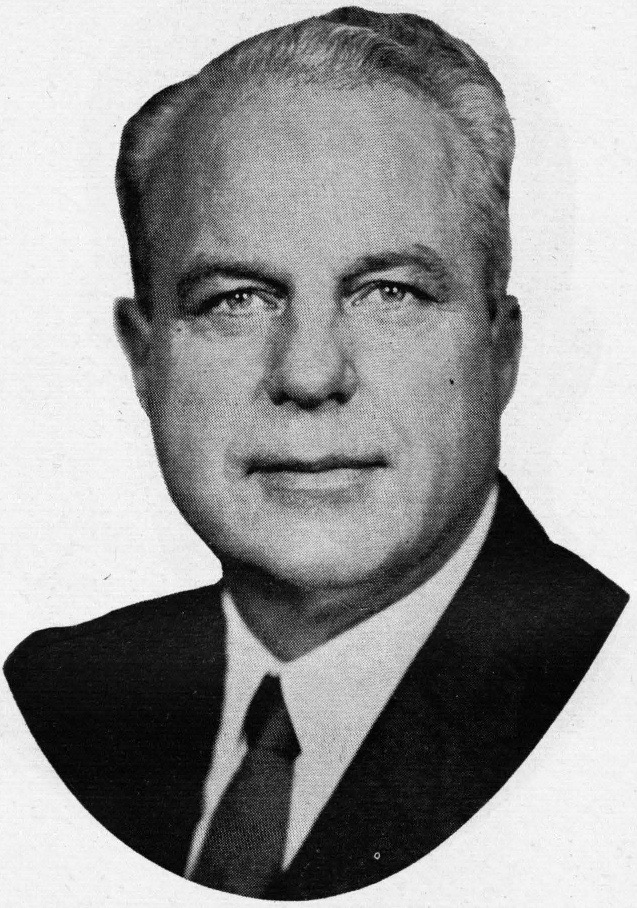
Nominee	Archie M. Gubbrud	Ralph Herseth
Party	Republican	Democratic
Popular vote	154,530	150,095
Percentage	50.73%	49.27%
- County results Gubbrud: 50–60% 60–70% 70–80% Herseth: 50–60% 60–70%
Governor before election
Ralph Herseth
Democratic
Elected Governor
Archie M. Gubbrud
Republican

The 1960 South Dakota gubernatorial election was held on November 8, 1960.

Incumbent Democratic Governor Ralph Herseth was defeated by Republican nominee Archie M. Gubbrud, who won 50.73% of the vote, Gubbrud defeated Herseth again 2 years later.

== Primary elections ==
Primary elections were held on June 7, 1960.

=== Democratic primary ===
==== Candidates ====
- Ralph Herseth, incumbent Governor

==== Results ====
Democratic primary results
Party	Candidate	Votes	%
Democratic	Ralph Herseth (inc.)		unopposed

=== Republican primary ===
==== Candidates ====
- Archie M. Gubbrud, Speaker of the South Dakota House of Representatives

==== Results ====
Republican primary results
Party	Candidate	Votes	%
Republican	Archie M. Gubbrud		unopposed

== General election ==
=== Candidates ===
- Ralph Herseth, Democratic
- Archie M. Gubbrud, Republican

=== Results ===
1960 South Dakota gubernatorial election
Party	Candidate	Votes	%	±%
Republican	Archie M. Gubbrud	154,530	50.73%	
Democratic	Ralph Herseth (inc.)	150,095	49.27%	
Majority		4,435	1.46%	
Turnout		304,625	100.00%	
Republican gain from Democratic		Swing		

== Bibliography ==
- Gubernatorial Elections, 1787-1997. Washington, D.C.: Congressional Quarterly Inc. 1998. ISBN 1-56802-396-0.
