= L. Roy Houck =

American politician

Lieutenant Governor of South Dakota
- In office 1955–1959
- Governor: Joe Foss
- Preceded by: Rex Terry
- Succeeded by: John F. Lindley

Personal details
- Born: January 28, 1905 Near Gettysburg, South Dakota, US
- Died: November 2, 1992 (aged 87) Rapid City, South Dakota, US
- Party: Republican

L. Roy Houck (January 28, 1905 – November 2, 1992) was an American rancher and politician from the U.S. state of South Dakota. A Republican, he served in the South Dakota State Senate from 1948 through 1954 and as lieutenant governor of South Dakota from 1955 through 1959.

== Early life ==
Houck was born on January 28, 1905, on a ranch near Gettysburg, South Dakota. He graduated from Gettysburg High School and began selling life insurance. In 1925, Houck, his father, and his older brother started the Triple U Hereford Ranch, where they raised Hereford cattle. He was president of the South Dakota State Livestock Council from 1943 through 1945 and president of the South Dakota Stockgrowers Association from 1947 through 1949.

== Political career ==
In 1948, Houck decided to run for the South Dakota State Senate as a Republican. Houck served in the state senate from 1949 through 1954.

In 1954, Houck ran for lieutenant governor of South Dakota. He was elected lieutenant governor and was reelected in 1956, defeating John F. Lindley. He ran for governor of South Dakota in 1958. He lost the nomination to Phil Saunders, the Attorney General of South Dakota. In the 1964 Republican Party presidential primaries, Houck organized support among South Dakota delegates for Barry Goldwater.

== Later life ==
In 1959, Houck sold the ranch near Gettysburg due to impact from the construction of the Oahe Dam and bought a ranch in Stanley County, South Dakota. A March 1966 blizzard killed Houck's cattle but spared his buffalo. He refocused his efforts on raising buffalo and renamed his ranch the Triple U Buffalo Ranch. The ranch grew to 60,000 acres (24,000 ha) and about 3,500 buffalo. The 1990 film Dances with Wolves used the ranch as a shooting location.

In 1992, Dale Lewis wrote a biography about Houck titled Roy Houck Buffalo Man.

Houck married Nellie (née Boehmer) on June 20, 1928. She died in 1988. They had four children. Houck died on November 2, 1992, in Rapid City, South Dakota.
