= Holdridge =

Holdridge may refer to:

People:

- Alex Holdridge (born 1975), American film writer/director
- Barbara Holdridge (1929–2025), American recording executive
- Bernard Holdridge (1935–2021), British Anglican priest
- Cheryl Holdridge (1944–2009), American actress
- David Holdridge (born 1969), American baseball player
- Herbert C. Holdridge (1892–1974), American military general, father of John H. Holdridge and adoptive father of Cheryl Holdridge
- John H. Holdridge (1924–2001), American foreign service officer and diplomat
- Lee Holdridge (born 1944), Haitian-American composer, conductor, and orchestrator
- Leslie Holdridge (1907–1999), American botanist and climatologist
- Ransome G. Holdridge (1836–1899), American painter

Places:

- Holdridge Island, Nunavut, Canada

Other:

- 14835 Holdridge, asteroid
- Holdridge life zones, a global bioclimatic scheme for the classification of land areas
