= Singapore–United States relations =

- Singapore: United States

Diplomatic mission
- Embassy of Singapore, Washington, D.C.: Embassy of the United States, Singapore

Envoy
- Singapore Ambassador to the United States Lui Tuck Yew: United States Ambassador to Singapore Anjani Sinha

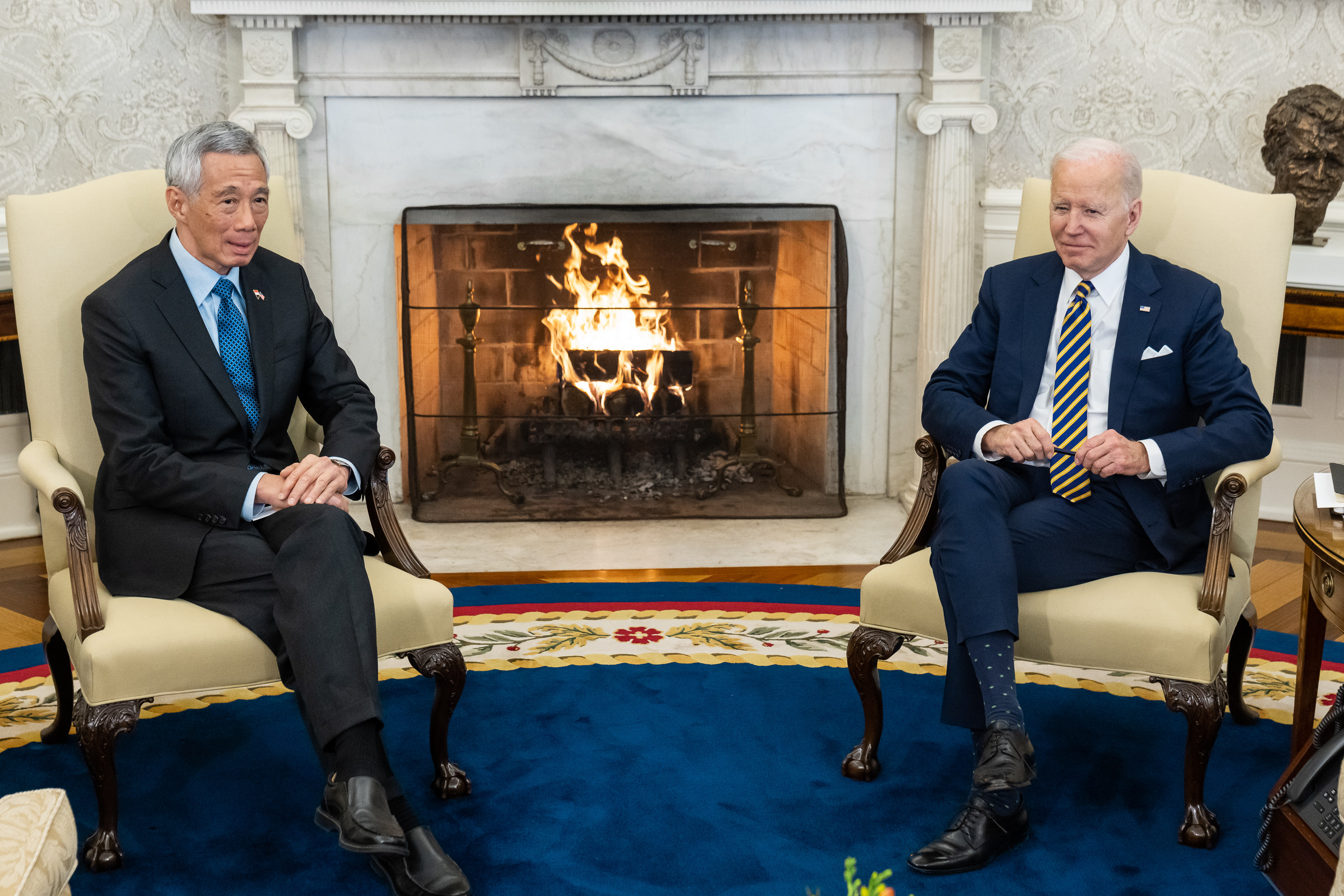
US President Joe Biden and Singapore Prime Minister Lee Hsien Loong at the Oval Office, during the latter's visit to the US in March 2022.

The bilateral relations between the Republic of Singapore and the United States of America are positive. Despite the close relationship between the two countries, on 1 April 2022, Prime Minister Lee Hsien Loong stated that Singapore is not an ally of the U.S., will not conduct military operations on behalf of the U.S., and will not seek direct military support from the U.S. This was reiterated by Lawrence Wong in 2024.

== History ==
In 1961 the Singaporean government arrested two CIA agents who attempted to bribe a Singaporean official in exchange for providing information to the CIA. Prime Minister Lee Kuan Yew requested 35 million dollars in economic aid in exchange for the covert release of the two agents. The Americans rejected this offer however and presented a counter-offer of 3.3 million dollars to be given directly to Lee and the People's Action Party. The men were later released without any financial exchange. Lee revealed this incident in 1965 which led to the Americans to deny it ever occurred, however Lee later made public a letter of apology from the US Secretary of State Dean Rusk over the incident.

The United States first opened a consulate in Singapore in 1836, when the island was part of the Straits Settlements of the British Empire. Singapore and the United States have maintained diplomatic relations since August 11, 1965, a few days after Singapore was expelled from the Malaysian Federation. U.S. recognition of the new state was expressed in a first person diplomatic note sent to Singapore for delivery to the Foreign Minister; the note was read to the press in Washington. Department of State Bulletin, August 30, 1965, p. 357; Mark Feldman Oral History, Association for Diplomatic Studies and Training, p. 24. Singapore's efforts to maintain economic growth and political stability and its support for regional cooperation harmonize with U.S. policy in the region and form a solid basis for amicable relations between the two countries.

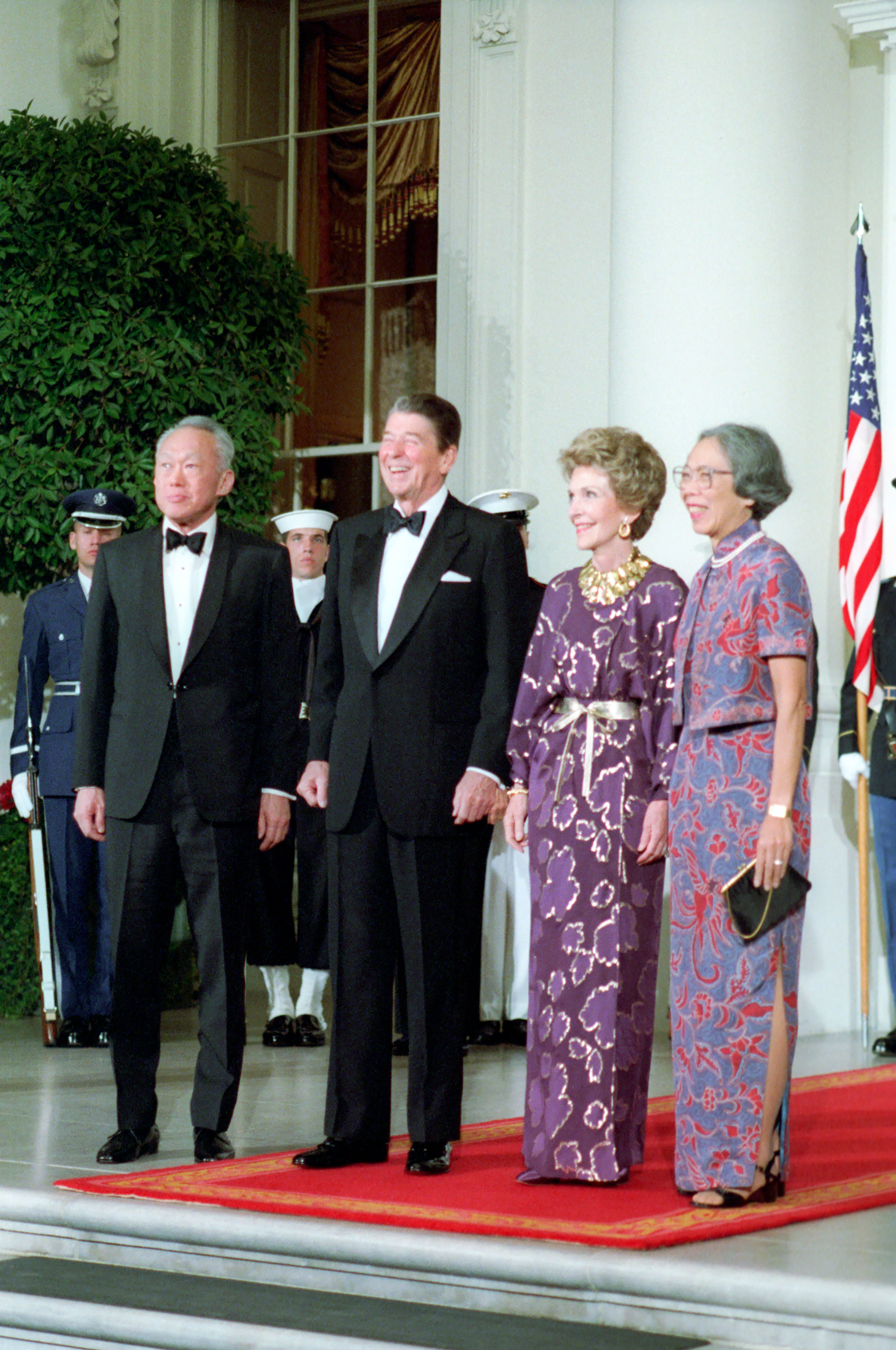
Singapore Prime Minister Lee Kuan Yew and his wife Kwa Geok Choo with US President Ronald Reagan and his wife Nancy Reagan on 8 October 1985 at the White House

From 1965 to 1975, the United States offered significant economic assistance to stabilise Singapore as a key segment of their containment of communism during the Cold War, and Singapore's economy industrialised through providing repair and transshipment facilities for the American forces in Vietnam.

=== Hendrickson affair ===
E. Mason "Hank" Hendrickson was serving as First Secretary of the United States Embassy when he was expelled by the Singapore Government in May 1988. Prior to his expulsion, he arranged for Francis Seow and Patrick Seong to travel to Washington, D.C. to meet with American officials. After their return, Singapore detained them under the Internal Security Act. Based on Seow and Seong's statements while in custody, the Singapore Government alleged that Hendrickson attempted to interfere in Singapore's internal affairs by cultivating opposition figures in a "Marxist conspiracy". First Deputy Prime Minister Goh Chok Tong claimed that Hendrickson's alleged conspiracy could have resulted in the election of 20 or 30 opposition politicians to Parliament, which in his words could lead to "horrendous" effects, possibly even the paralysis and fall of the Singapore Government.

In the aftermath of Hendrickson's expulsion, the U.S. State Department praised his performance in Singapore and denied any impropriety in his actions. The State Department also expelled Robert Chua, a senior-level Singaporean diplomat equal in rank to Mason, from Washington, D.C. in response. The State Department's refusal to reprimand Hendrickson, along with their expulsion of the Singaporean diplomat, sparked a protest in Singapore by the National Trades Union Congress; they drove buses around the U.S. embassy, held a rally attended by four thousand workers, and issued a statement deriding the U.S. as "sneaky, arrogant, and untrustworthy".

A paper published by The Heritage Foundation speculated that Singapore's angry public reaction to the Hendrickson affair may have been a response to the January 1988 termination of Singapore's eligibility for the Generalized System of Preferences, which provided tariff exemptions on Singaporean exports to the United States.

=== 2018 North Korea–United States Summit ===
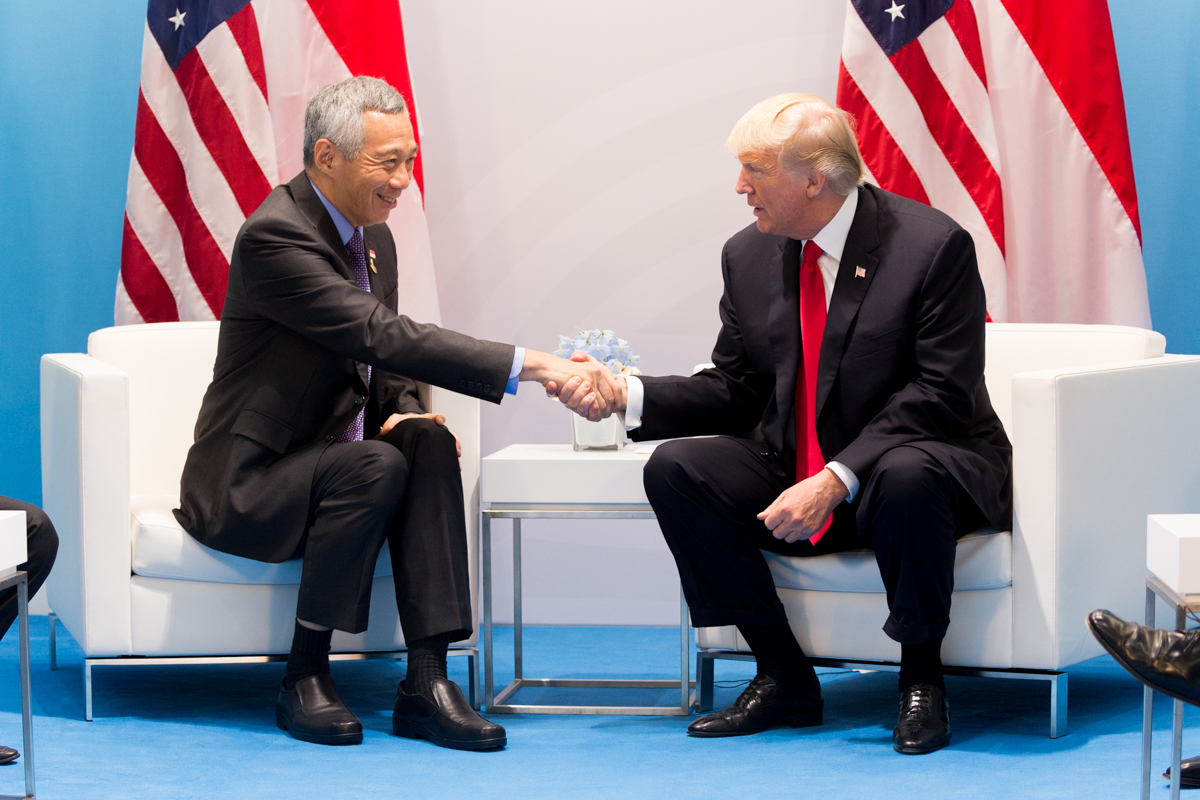
Prime Minister Lee Hsien Loong and President Donald Trump at the 12th G20 summit in Hamburg, July 2017.

The latest meeting was held on 11 June 2018 between Prime Minister Lee Hsien Loong and President Donald Trump at the Istana before meeting North Korean leader Kim Jong Un the next day.

=== Second Trump Administration ===
In April 2025, Trump administration announced 10% universal tariff on all goods brought into the U.S. with 60 countries facing even higher rates. This effectively imposed a 10% tariff on Singapore as well.

In May 2025, Singapore's Ministry of Foreign Affairs said foreign embassies should not use international disputes involving third parties to provoke domestic reactions as such geopolitical matters were best handled through diplomacy. The statement was made following an argument on social media between the US and Chinese embassies over the South China Sea that stemmed from a video posted by the US Embassy which likened China's maritime claims to a neighbor illegally occupying shared spaces in Singapore's public housing.

In February 2026, US President Donald Trump announced a 15% tariff on Singapore, an increase from an earlier 10%.

== Fields of relations ==
During the 2015 ASEAN Summit, when US President Barack Obama met Singapore Prime Minister Lee Hsien Loong, Obama described the state of bilateral relations as being "very, very strong."

=== Free trade agreement ===
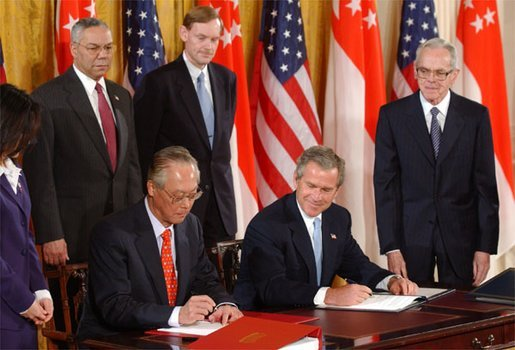
Singapore Prime Minister Goh Chok Tong and US President George W. Bush signing the free trade agreement in 2003.

The United States and Singapore signed the Singapore–United States Free Trade Agreement on 6 May 2003; the agreement entered into force on 1 January 2004. The growth of U.S. investment in Singapore and the large number of Americans living there enhance opportunities for contact between Singapore and the United States. Singapore is a Visa Waiver Program country.

The Singapore Government denied speculation that the signing of the FTA was linked to Singapore's support of the Iraq War coalition shortly before the signing.

=== Military relations ===
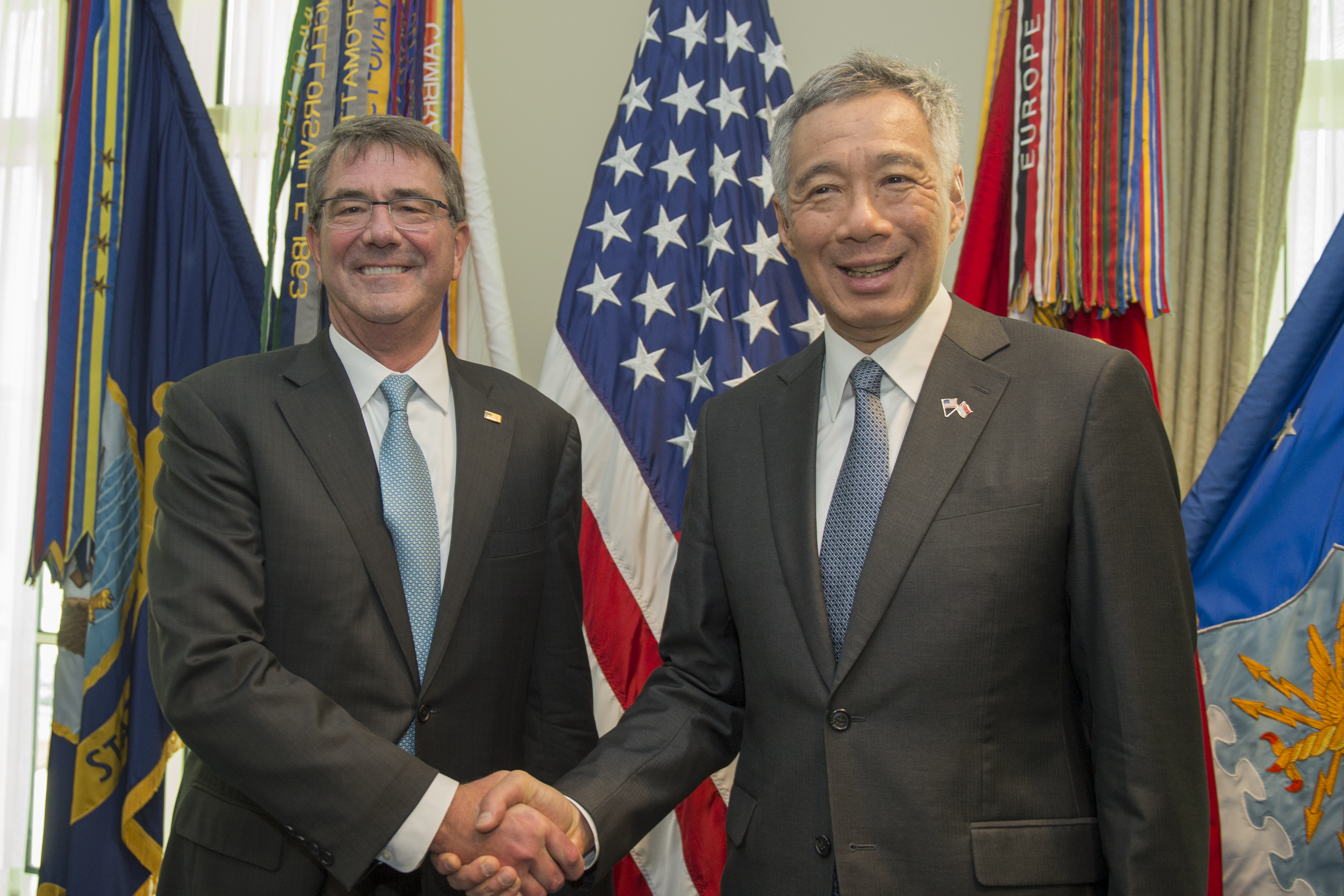
Singapore Prime Minister Lee Hsien Loong and U.S. Secretary of Defense Ash Carter in 2016.

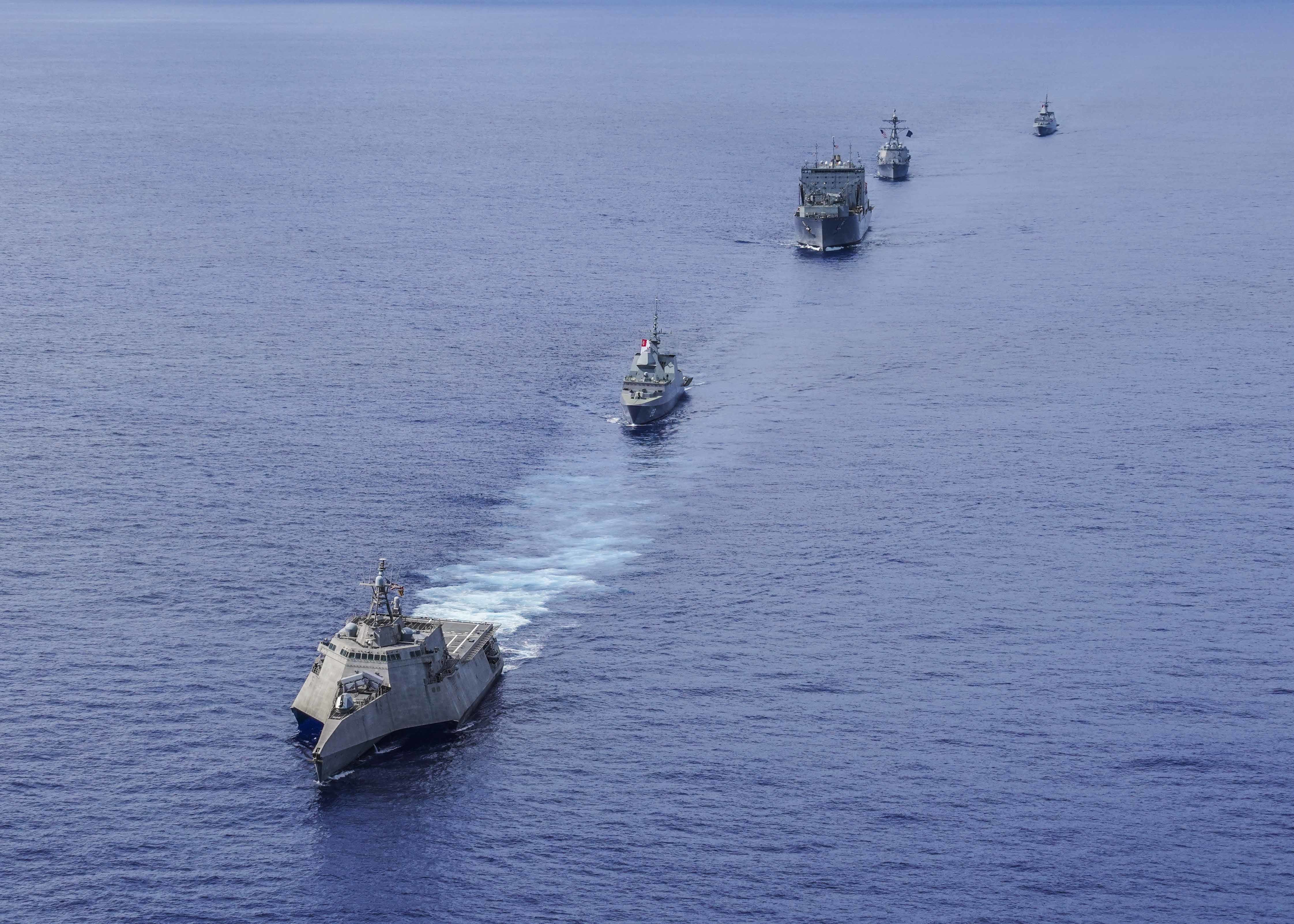
Ships from the United States Navy and the Republic of Singapore Navy travel in formation in 2019.

Singapore has long standing military relations with the United States. The United States sells arms to Singapore and provides access to its bases to train the Singaporean military outside of their small island city-state. Under the U.S.–Singapore Strategic Framework Agreement, some U.S. Navy littoral combat ships are rotationally deployed to Singapore's Changi Naval Base. Air Force One also lands at Paya Lebar Air Base whenever the president visits the country. On September 23, 2019, Singapore Prime Minister Lee Hsien Loong and US President Donald Trump renewed a key defence pact which allows American forces to use Singapore's air and naval bases, extending it by another 15 years to 2035. On 1 April 2022, Prime Minister Lee Hsien Loong emphasised that Singapore is not an ally of the United States, Singapore will not be involved in a war of the United States or ask the United States to come to the rescue when something happens to Singapore.

The Fat Leonard scandal started in 1997 when Singapore-based contractor Malaysian Leonard Glenn Francis began bribing multiple American naval personnel with prostitutes, free hotel rooms and lavish dinners in exchange for lucrative deals resupplying their warships which would overcharge the US navy by up to 35 million dollars. Following US federal investigations, Francis was arrested in San Diego in 2013. In 2019, a local accomplice of Francis was sentenced to 40 months in prison by the High Court of Singapore.

==== Relief operations ====
Following that devastation of the United States Gulf Coast by Hurricane Katrina, three Singaporean CH-47 Chinook helicopters and 38 RSAF personnel from a training detachment based in Grand Prairie, Texas, assisted in relief operations from 1 September. They ferried about 700 evacuees and hauled tons of supplies in 39 sorties on 4 September. One more CH-47 Chinook helicopter was sent to aid in relief efforts.

=== Academic exchanges ===
In 2011, more than 4,300 Singaporeans were studying in the United States, the highest figure in 10 years. The number of Singaporean students studying in the United States grew by 7 percent since 2010. American universities with the most number of Singaporeans are among the most prestigious in the country which includes Harvard University, Cornell University, Stanford University, and University of California, Berkeley. To add to the rising number of college students study in the United States, many local students in Singapore have also opted to study in American high schools. US Ambassador to Singapore David I. Adelman said that the high number of Singaporeans studying in the United States reflects that Singapore–United States relations "have never been better".

In 2012, Singapore and the United States signed a Memorandum of Understanding (MOU) to enhance collaboration in education between the two countries. This is the second MOU between the United States and Singapore on education. The first MOU signed in 2002 primarily focused on the teaching and learning of the Singaporean method of mathematics and science. The 2012 MOU have enhanced the teaching of mathematics and science, teacher development and school leadership, and educational research and benchmarking studies. In addition, the conference also announced that the National Institute of Education (NIE) in Singapore and Columbia University's Teachers College are launching a joint Masters of Arts in Leadership and Educational Change. This joint Masters programme will take in up to 30 students from January 2013.

The U.S. government sponsors visitors from Singapore each year under the International Visitor Leadership Program (IVLP). The U.S. government provides Fulbright Awards to enable selected American professors to teach or conduct research at the National University of Singapore and the Institute of Southeast Asian Studies. It awards scholarships to outstanding Singaporean students for graduate studies at American universities and to American students to study in Singapore. The U.S. government also sponsors occasional cultural presentations in Singapore. The East-West Center and private American organizations, such as the Asia Foundation and Ford Foundation, also sponsor exchanges involving Singaporeans.

== Public opinion ==
According to the U.S. Global Leadership Report, 77% of Singaporeans approved of U.S. leadership under the Obama Administration in 2010, and while this approval rating decreased slightly down to 75% in 2011, it nonetheless remains one of the highest ratings of the U.S. for any surveyed country in the Asia-Pacific region. According to a 2026 Pew Research Center survey, 34% of Singaporeans had a favorable view of the United States, while 66% had a negative view.

== Resident diplomatic missions ==
of Singapore in the United States

- Washington, D.C. (Embassy)
- New York City (Consulate)
- San Francisco (Consulate-General)

of the United States in Singapore

- Singapore (Embassy)

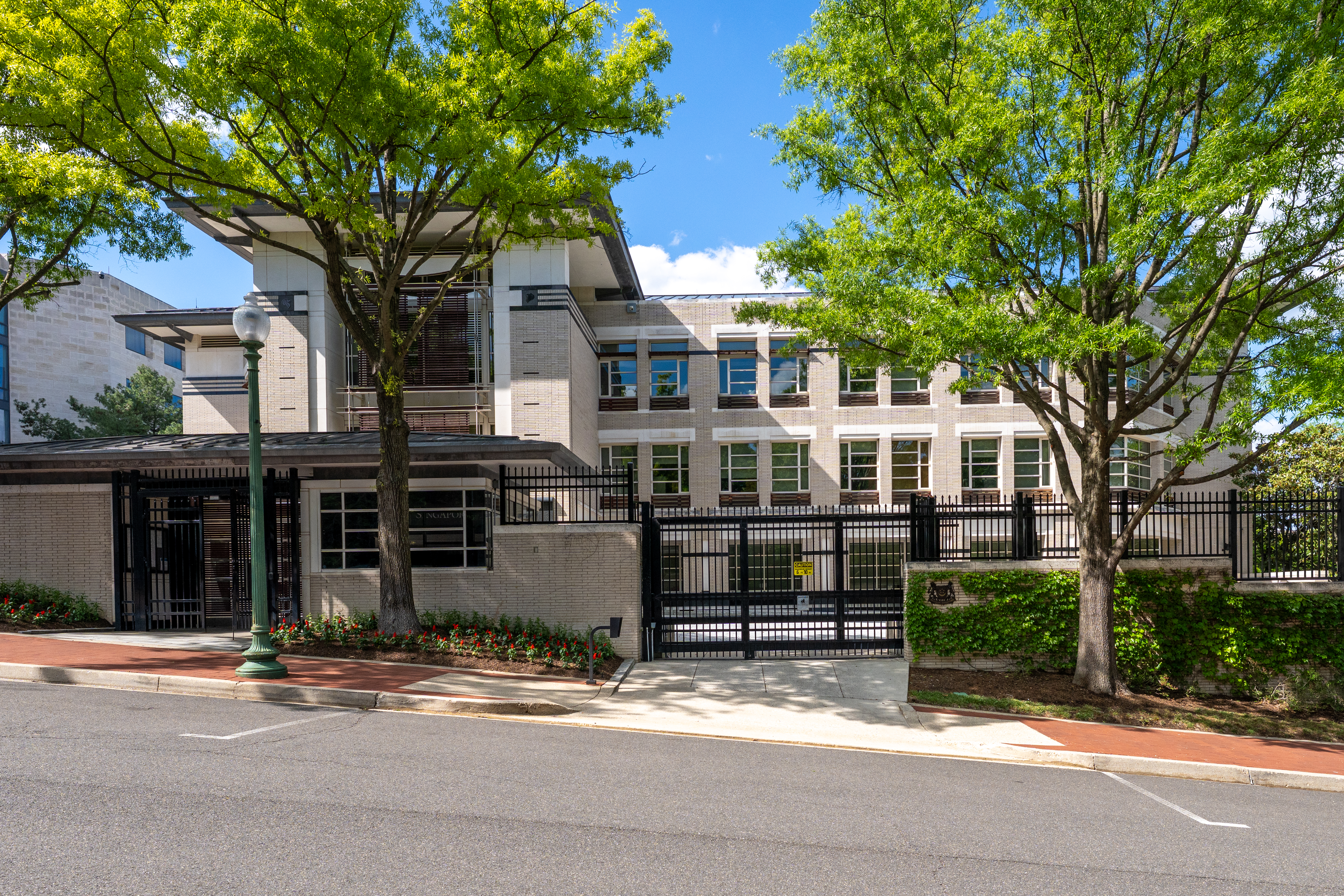
Embassy of Singapore in Washington, D.C.

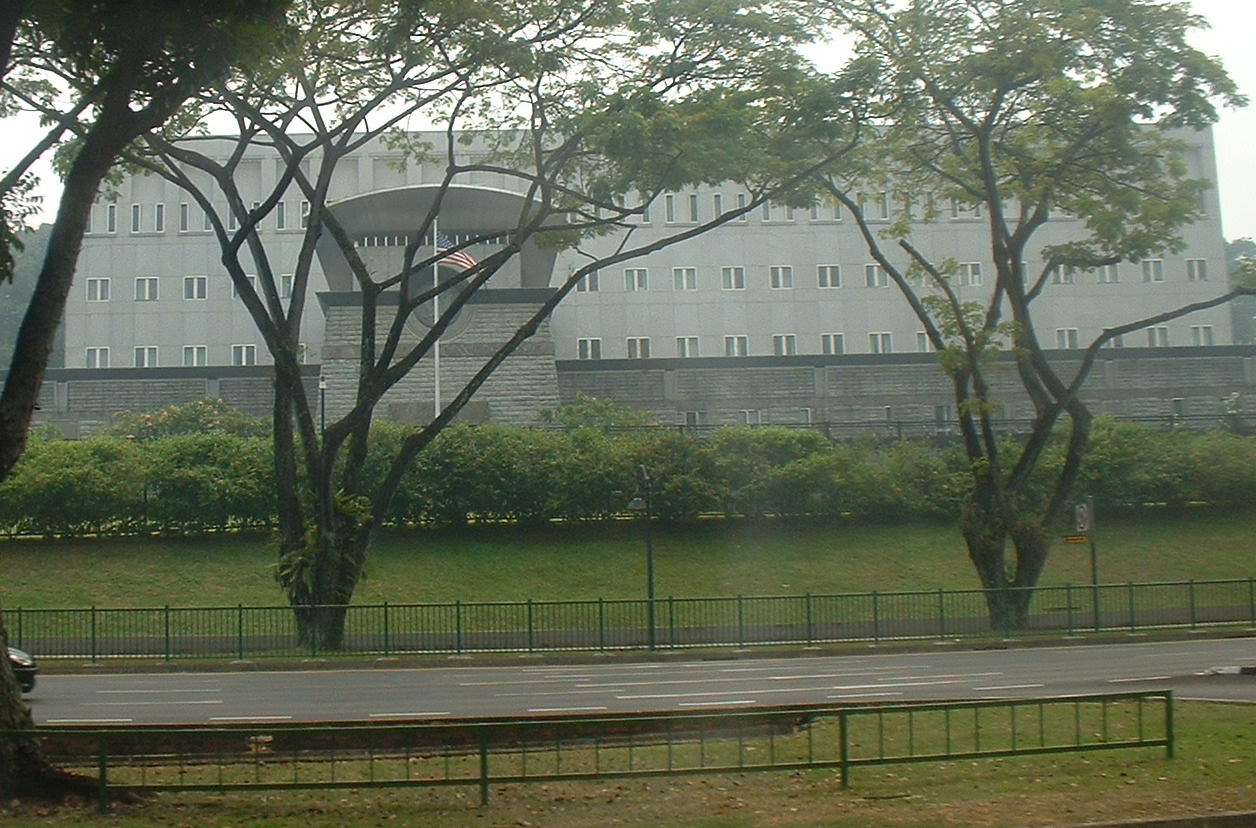
Embassy of the United States in Singapore

== See also ==
- Singaporean Americans
- Foreign relations of the United States
- Foreign relations of Singapore
