= Embassy of the United States, Singapore =

Diplomatic mission of the United States of America in Singapore

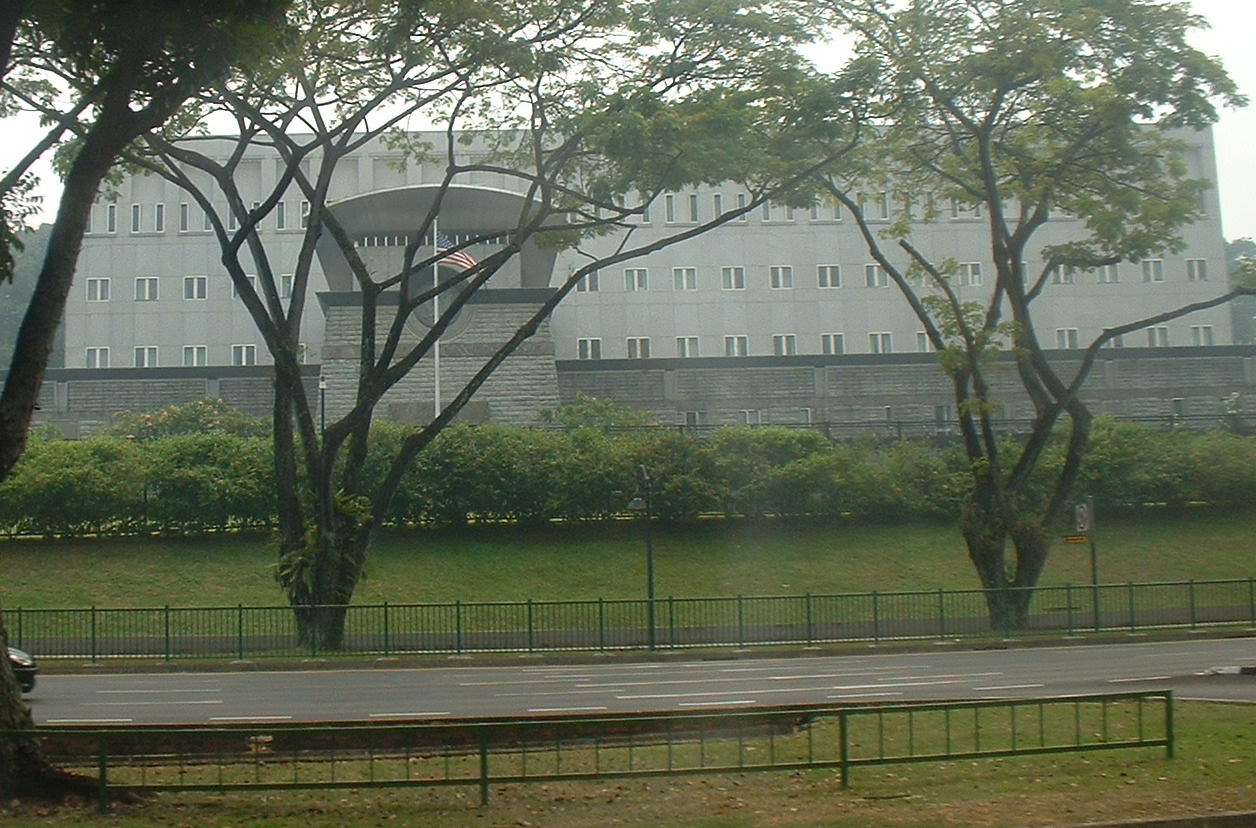
- Location: Singapore
- Address: 27 Napier Rd, Singapore 258508
- Coordinates: 1.305329°N 103.820391°E
- Ambassador: Anjani Sinha
- Website: sg.usembassy.gov

The Embassy of the United States of America, Singapore is the diplomatic mission of the United States to Singapore. It is one of the largest American embassies in the Asia-Pacific region and the focal point for events relating to the United States held in Singapore.

It also provides assistance to American citizens and residents who live in Singapore, and issues visas to Singapore nationals (Note: As Singapore is a part of the Visa Waiver Program, Singapore citizens may travel to the United States for tourism, business, or while in transit for up to 90 days without having to obtain a visa.) and foreign nationals residing in Singapore.

The office of the United States Ambassador to Singapore was held by Jonathan E. Kaplan, appointed with effect from 6 December 2021 until Jan 2025.

== Location ==
The embassy is located at Tanglin Road. The closest Mass Rapid Transit (MRT) station is Napier.

== History ==
=== Early years ===
The first US diplomatic mission in Singapore was established in 1833 with the assignment of Joseph Balestier as consul. Although Singapore was an important free trade port, there was some question over whether Americans were legally allowed to conduct business there by the British, and so he was officially assigned to "Rhio (Riau, then a part of the Dutch East Indies) and such other places as are nearer thereto than to the Residence of any other Consul or Vice Consul of the United States" while residing in Singapore and mostly conducting business related to the territory. It was only in 1836 that an official consulate was established in Singapore with Balestier as consul. The post was promoted to a consulate-general in 1893.

=== 20th century ===
The mission acquired the Spring Grove house in 1930 to house diplomats and opened a United States Information Service library on 26 Raffles Place in 1950 that the embassy claims "was so popular that bus services to downtown Singapore had to be extended through the evenings".

A new consulate building, the first to be built instead of acquired for this purpose, was opened on 30 Hill Road in 1961. Although the United States first proposed that the post be raised to embassy status in late 1965, the Singaporean government took a while to warm up to the idea as it gradually shifted to improve relations with the US while maintaining a non-aligned stance overall, and the promotion was finally agreed to and executed in April 1966.

=== Current location ===
During the 1990s, it was decided that the embassy is to moved to a new site at the Tanglin district for improved security and capacity measures, with several embassy properties being sold in 1989 to fund the nearly US$100 million cost of the new compound. In 1994, ground was broken and the construction of the new complex officially began. Designed by The Stubbins Associates, it was completed in 1997 after around two years.

== Role in Singapore–United States relations ==
The embassy has been reprimanded at times by the Singapore government over what it states are "interference in Singapore's internal politics", dating back to the Hendrickson affair in 1988 which led to a major diplomatic fallout involving the recall of a diplomat each from both countries' embassies.

In May 2021, a minor event occurred after the embassy held a virtual seminar with an LGBT group about the economic benefits of inclusion worldwide, with Singaporean authorities stating that it amounted to U.S. interference in the national debate over the government's LGBT policies. It also declared that such domestic social and political matters are "choices for only Singaporeans to debate and decide." Embassy representatives refuted those allegations.

In March 2024, the U.S. Department of State Office of Inspector General released a report on Ambassador Jonathan E. Kaplan. The audit found that Kaplan had threatened embassy staff and made poor relations with the Singapore government.

== See also ==
- United States Ambassador to Singapore
- Singapore–United States relations
- Embassy of Singapore in Washington, D.C.
