= Herbold =

Herbold is a surname. Notable people with the surname include:

- Bob Herbold (born 1942), American writer
- Fred Herbold (1875–1914), American football player and coach
- Greg Herbold (born 1962), American cyclist
- Lisa Herbold (born 1967), American politician
- Patricia L. Herbold (born 1940), American chemist and diplomat
