= U.S. Embassy Singapore Alumni Mentoring Program =

United States–Singapore bilateral educational initiative

U.S. Embassy Singapore Alumni Mentoring Program (USEAMP)
- Mission statement: To strengthen people-to-people ties between the United States and Singapore through mentorship, leadership development, and cross-cultural exchange.
- Type of project: Bilateral educational mentoring program
- Location: Singapore
- Owner: Embassy of the United States, Singapore; Institute of Technical Education
- Founder: David I. Adelman
- Country: Singapore
- Key people: David I. Adelman (initiator); Public Affairs Section, U.S. Embassy Singapore
- Established: January 2013; 13 years ago
- Funding: U.S. Department of State, Institute of Technical Education
- Status: Active – ninth cycle (2025)
- Website: sg.usembassy.gov/tag/embassy-alumni-mentoring-program/

The U.S. Embassy Singapore Alumni Mentoring Program is a bilateral educational initiative established in 2013 by the Embassy of the United States, Singapore, and the Institute of Technical Education (ITE). The program was initiated by David I. Adelman, then-United States Ambassador to Singapore.

Each year, the program pairs ITE students with mentors who are alumni of U.S. government exchange programs, such as Fulbright Program, Young Southeast Asian Leaders Initiative, and the International Visitor Leadership Program. Mentors have included representatives from organizations such as Nike, Conrad Centennial Singapore, Boeing, Mastercard, Bloomberg and Google, alongside U.S. and Singaporean government officials, diplomats, and members of parliament.

The program consists of multiple sessions and includes workshops, career talks, and site visits to multinational companies. Topics covered in discussions include goal setting, resilience, and communication skills. By 2024, the program had completed nine cycles.
