= Richard Donald =

Richard Donald (or variants) may refer to:

- Richard Atley Donald, baseball player
- Dick Donald, footballer and businessman
- Richard H. Donald, ambassador
- Rick Donald, Australian actor
