= Kirk Wagar =

American diplomat

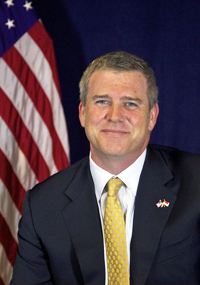

United States Ambassador to Singapore
- In office September 25, 2013 – January 20, 2017
- President: Barack Obama
- Preceded by: David I. Adelman
- Succeeded by: Stephanie Syptak-Ramnath (Chargée d'affaires, a.i.)

Personal details
- Born: July 13, 1969 (age 57) Perth, Ontario, Canada
- Party: Democratic
- Spouse: Crystal Connor
- Children: 4
- Education: Roberts Wesleyan College; University of Miami

Kirk W. B. Wagar (born July 13, 1969) is a former United States Ambassador to Singapore. He was sworn in as ambassador on September 4, 2013. Following the inauguration of President Donald Trump, Wagar left his post as ambassador on January 20, 2017.

In June 2024, Wagar was named as the main funder behind Terra Invest, a new firm that planned to invest a significant part of its $2.5 billion dollar fund into Artificial Investment (AI) start ups based in India. As of the date of that reporting, transactions totaling $230 million had already been completed.

Diplomatic posts
Preceded by David Adelman	United States Ambassador to Singapore; 2013–2017	Succeeded by Jonathan Kaplan
