= 1956 United States presidential election in Indiana =

- November 6, 1956
- Turnout: 73.7% ▼2.0 pp

Nominee	Dwight D. Eisenhower	Adlai Stevenson II
Party	Republican	Democratic
Home state	Pennsylvania (Note: Eisenhower moved his private residence to Gettysburg, Pennsylvania during his first term as president.)	Illinois
Running mate	Richard Nixon	Estes Kefauver
Electoral vote	13	0
Popular vote	1,182,811	783,908
Percentage	59.90%	39.70%
County results
Eisenhower
50–60%
60–70%
70–80%
Stevenson
50–60%
President before election
Dwight D. Eisenhower
Republican
Elected President
Dwight D. Eisenhower
Republican

A presidential election was held in Indiana on November 6, 1956, as part of the 1956 United States presidential election. The Republican ticket of the incumbent president of the United States Dwight D. Eisenhower and the vice president of the United States Richard Nixon defeated the Democratic ticket of the former governor of Illinois Adlai Stevenson II and the senior U.S. senator from Tennessee Estes Kefauver. Eisenhower defeated Stevenson in the national election with 457 electoral votes.

== Primary elections ==
=== Republican Party ===
Indiana Republican primary, May 8, 1956
Party	Candidate	Votes	%
Republican	Dwight D. Eisenhower	351,903	96.35
Republican	Lar Daly	13,320	3.65
Total votes		365,223	100.00

=== Democratic Party ===
Indiana Democratic primary, May 8, 1956
Party	Candidate	Votes	%
Democratic	Estes Kefauver	242,842	100.00
Total votes		242,842	100.00

== General election ==
=== Results ===
1956 United States presidential election in Indiana
Party	Candidate	Votes	%	±%
Republican	Dwight D. Eisenhower Richard Nixon	1,182,811	59.90	▲1.79
Democratic	Adlai Stevenson II Estes Kefauver	783,908	39.70	▼1.29
Prohibition	Enoch Holtwick Herbert C. Holdridge	6,554	0.33	▼0.45
Socialist Labor	Eric Hass Georgia Cozzini	1,334	0.07	▲0.02
Total votes		1,974,607	100.00	

=== Results by county ===
1956 United States presidential election in Indiana by county
County	Dwight D. Eisenhower Republican		Adlai Stevenson Democratic		Others		Margin		Total
County	Votes	%	Votes	%	Votes	%	Votes	%	Total
Adams	7,079	66.11%	3,520	32.87%	109	1.02%	3,559	33.24%	10,708
Allen	58,210	69.43%	25,444	30.35%	190	0.23%	32,766	39.08%	83,844
Bartholomew	12,227	59.78%	8,134	39.77%	92	0.45%	4,093	20.01%	20,453
Benton	4,004	67.02%	1,961	32.83%	9	0.15%	2,043	34.19%	5,974
Blackford	3,855	54.52%	3,152	44.58%	64	0.91%	703	9.94%	7,071
Boone	8,573	61.56%	5,318	38.19%	35	0.25%	3,255	23.37%	13,926
Brown	1,649	51.23%	1,555	48.31%	15	0.47%	94	2.92%	3,219
Carroll	5,748	63.26%	3,312	36.45%	26	0.29%	2,436	26.81%	9,086
Cass	12,624	62.19%	7,594	37.41%	81	0.40%	5,030	24.78%	20,299
Clark	12,483	51.09%	11,871	48.59%	79	0.32%	612	2.50%	24,433
Clay	7,302	55.91%	5,720	43.79%	39	0.30%	1,582	12.12%	13,061
Clinton	9,690	60.44%	6,268	39.10%	74	0.46%	3,422	21.34%	16,032
Crawford	2,694	51.96%	2,433	46.92%	58	1.12%	261	5.04%	5,185
Daviess	8,608	62.80%	5,057	36.89%	42	0.31%	3,551	25.91%	13,707
Dearborn	7,189	56.40%	5,535	43.43%	22	0.17%	1,654	12.97%	12,746
Decatur	6,390	64.87%	3,427	34.79%	34	0.35%	2,963	30.08%	9,851
DeKalb	9,061	66.75%	4,435	32.67%	79	0.58%	4,626	34.08%	13,575
Delaware	24,792	54.10%	20,818	45.43%	217	0.47%	3,974	8.67%	45,827
Dubois	6,942	57.19%	5,177	42.65%	20	0.16%	1,765	14.54%	12,139
Elkhart	28,088	69.05%	12,363	30.39%	226	0.56%	15,725	38.66%	40,677
Fayette	6,673	56.26%	5,156	43.47%	33	0.28%	1,517	12.79%	11,862
Floyd	10,410	55.18%	8,378	44.41%	77	0.41%	2,032	10.77%	18,865
Fountain	6,456	63.11%	3,751	36.67%	23	0.22%	2,705	26.44%	10,230
Franklin	4,429	63.02%	2,573	36.61%	26	0.37%	1,856	26.41%	7,028
Fulton	6,258	67.59%	2,945	31.81%	56	0.60%	3,313	35.78%	9,259
Gibson	9,256	55.58%	7,318	43.94%	79	0.47%	1,938	11.64%	16,653
Grant	17,548	64.50%	9,455	34.75%	203	0.75%	8,093	29.75%	27,206
Greene	8,722	54.62%	7,186	45.00%	61	0.38%	1,536	9.62%	15,969
Hamilton	11,220	68.96%	4,974	30.57%	77	0.47%	6,246	38.39%	16,271
Hancock	6,962	59.93%	4,600	39.60%	55	0.47%	2,362	20.33%	11,617
Harrison	5,299	54.92%	4,266	44.22%	83	0.86%	1,033	10.70%	9,648
Hendricks	10,578	65.58%	5,521	34.23%	30	0.19%	5,057	31.35%	16,129
Henry	13,750	61.33%	8,502	37.92%	166	0.74%	5,248	23.41%	22,418
Howard	17,234	58.26%	12,159	41.10%	188	0.64%	5,075	17.16%	29,581
Huntington	11,024	64.15%	6,027	35.07%	133	0.77%	4,997	29.08%	17,184
Jackson	8,375	57.30%	6,185	42.31%	57	0.39%	2,190	14.99%	14,617
Jasper	5,374	72.63%	2,004	27.08%	21	0.28%	3,370	45.55%	7,399
Jay	6,767	59.08%	4,571	39.91%	116	1.01%	2,196	19.17%	11,454
Jefferson	6,632	60.27%	4,344	39.48%	28	0.25%	2,288	20.79%	11,004
Jennings	4,502	60.72%	2,879	38.83%	33	0.45%	1,623	21.89%	7,414
Johnson	10,125	62.15%	6,125	37.60%	41	0.25%	4,000	24.55%	16,291
Knox	13,047	59.85%	8,691	39.87%	63	0.29%	4,356	19.98%	21,801
Kosciusko	12,777	71.68%	4,904	27.51%	143	0.80%	7,873	44.17%	17,824
LaGrange	3,815	70.47%	1,562	28.85%	37	0.68%	2,253	41.61%	5,414
Lake	92,803	52.00%	85,000	47.63%	657	0.37%	7,803	4.37%	178,460
LaPorte	24,622	62.90%	14,417	36.83%	103	0.26%	10,205	26.07%	39,142
Lawrence	11,090	63.93%	6,197	35.73%	59	0.34%	4,893	28.20%	17,346
Madison	30,329	54.21%	25,408	45.42%	206	0.37%	4,921	8.79%	55,943
Marion	162,566	61.97%	99,102	37.78%	679	0.26%	63,464	24.19%	262,347
Marshall	10,504	65.72%	5,398	33.78%	80	0.50%	5,106	31.94%	15,982
Martin	2,946	55.63%	2,343	44.24%	7	0.13%	603	11.39%	5,296
Miami	9,574	62.28%	5,724	37.24%	74	0.48%	3,850	25.04%	15,372
Monroe	13,223	62.92%	7,732	36.79%	60	0.29%	5,491	26.13%	21,015
Montgomery	10,418	65.41%	5,443	34.17%	66	0.41%	4,975	31.24%	15,927
Morgan	8,318	63.48%	4,735	36.14%	50	0.38%	3,583	27.34%	13,103
Newton	3,890	74.49%	1,316	25.20%	16	0.31%	2,574	49.29%	5,222
Noble	8,175	66.64%	4,028	32.84%	64	0.52%	4,147	33.80%	12,267
Ohio	1,237	53.07%	1,087	46.63%	7	0.30%	150	6.44%	2,331
Orange	5,751	62.37%	3,438	37.28%	32	0.35%	2,313	25.09%	9,221
Owen	3,685	58.48%	2,581	40.96%	35	0.56%	1,104	17.52%	6,301
Parke	5,080	59.04%	3,502	40.70%	22	0.26%	1,578	18.34%	8,604
Perry	4,946	55.00%	4,037	44.89%	10	0.11%	909	10.11%	8,993
Pike	4,596	57.34%	3,353	41.83%	66	0.82%	1,243	15.51%	8,015
Porter	14,970	72.71%	5,574	27.07%	45	0.22%	9,396	45.64%	20,589
Posey	5,780	59.44%	3,919	40.30%	25	0.26%	1,861	19.14%	9,724
Pulaski	4,117	62.07%	2,424	36.54%	92	1.39%	1,693	25.53%	6,633
Putnam	6,684	59.26%	4,572	40.53%	24	0.21%	2,112	18.73%	11,280
Randolph	9,020	65.02%	4,701	33.89%	152	1.10%	4,319	31.13%	13,873
Ripley	6,577	61.85%	4,026	37.86%	30	0.28%	2,551	23.99%	10,633
Rush	6,202	64.69%	3,346	34.90%	39	0.41%	2,856	29.79%	9,587
St. Joseph	57,827	51.41%	54,152	48.15%	493	0.44%	3,675	3.26%	112,472
Scott	3,117	50.63%	3,011	48.91%	28	0.45%	106	1.72%	6,156
Shelby	9,170	58.00%	6,561	41.50%	80	0.51%	2,609	16.50%	15,811
Spencer	5,404	60.31%	3,530	39.40%	26	0.29%	1,874	20.91%	8,960
Starke	5,063	59.94%	3,349	39.65%	35	0.41%	1,714	20.29%	8,447
Steuben	5,538	71.56%	2,171	28.05%	30	0.39%	3,367	43.51%	7,739
Sullivan	5,829	48.79%	6,048	50.63%	69	0.58%	-219	-1.84%	11,946
Switzerland	2,074	49.28%	2,114	50.23%	21	0.50%	-40	-0.95%	4,209
Tippecanoe	23,776	70.25%	9,995	29.53%	72	0.21%	13,781	40.72%	33,843
Tipton	4,939	59.47%	3,320	39.98%	46	0.55%	1,619	19.49%	8,305
Union	2,026	63.47%	1,157	36.25%	9	0.28%	869	27.22%	3,192
Vanderburgh	42,462	57.68%	30,860	41.92%	297	0.40%	11,602	15.76%	73,619
Vermillion	5,352	50.81%	5,149	48.88%	32	0.30%	203	1.93%	10,533
Vigo	25,253	50.44%	24,680	49.29%	135	0.27%	573	1.15%	50,068
Wabash	10,318	71.18%	4,085	28.18%	93	0.64%	6,233	43.00%	14,496
Warren	2,979	67.61%	1,408	31.96%	19	0.43%	1,571	35.65%	4,406
Warrick	6,286	57.21%	4,668	42.49%	33	0.30%	1,618	14.72%	10,987
Washington	4,864	55.66%	3,849	44.04%	26	0.30%	1,015	11.62%	8,739
Wayne	20,157	61.76%	12,337	37.80%	144	0.44%	7,820	23.96%	32,638
Wells	5,703	58.32%	3,984	40.74%	91	0.93%	1,719	17.58%	9,778
White	6,708	67.42%	3,219	32.36%	22	0.22%	3,489	35.06%	9,949
Whitley	6,422	63.23%	3,688	36.31%	47	0.46%	2,734	26.92%	10,157
TOTAL	1,182,811	59.90%	783,908	39.70%	7,888	0.40%	398,903	20.20%	1,974,607

==== Counties that flipped from Democratic to Republican ====
- Clark
- Lake
- Vermillion
- Vigo

=== Results by congressional district ===
A majority of the vote in all districts went to Dwight D. Eisenhower in Indiana that year.

District	Eisenhower	Stevenson
1st	52.2%	47.8%
2nd	68.4%	31.6%
3rd	58.4%	41.6%
4th	68%	32%
5th	60.2%	39.8%
6th	59%	41%
7th	58.9%	41.1%
8th	56.5%	43.5%
9th	59.2%	40.8%
10th	59.8%	40.2%
11st	62.1%	37.9%

== See also ==
- United States presidential elections in Indiana

== Bibliography ==
- Congressional Quarterly (1985). Congressional Quarterly's Guide to U.S. Elections (2nd ed.). Washington D.C.: Congressional Quarterly. ISBN 978-0-87187-339-2.
- Lenning, Frank A. (1956). Annual Election Report of the Secretary of State of the State of Indiana: 1956 General Election Statistics. Indianapolis: Indiana Secretary of State.
- Madison, James H. (1986). The Indiana Way: A State History. Bloomington: Indiana University Press.
- Petersen, Svend (1963). A Statistical History of the American Presidential Elections. New York: Frederick Ungar Publishing Company. LCCN 62-21786.
- Smith, Jean Edward (2012). Eisenhower in War and Peace. New York: Random House.
