= Senator Adelman =

Senator Adelman may refer to:

- David I. Adelman (born 1964), Georgia State Senate
- Lynn Adelman (born 1939), Wisconsin State Senate
