= Francis J. Galbraith =

American diplomat (1913–1986)

Francis Joseph Galbraith (December 9, 1913 – June 25, 1986) was a United States diplomat and member of the American Academy of Political and Social Science.

He was born on December 9, 1913, in Timber Lake, Dewey County, South Dakota, and worked as cowboy and rodeo rider on his father's ranch near the Cheyenne River Sioux Indian Reservation until he attended the University of Puget Sound receiving a B.A. in History in 1939 and a B.A. in librarianship from the University of Washington in 1940. He attained the rank of Captain while serving in the U.S. Army in the South Pacific from 1941 to 1942, and joined the Foreign Service in 1946 serving as U.S. Vice Consul in Hamburg, 1946–1948; Batavia, 1949–1950. After serving as U.S. chargé d'affaires in Indonesia, he was appointed U.S. Ambassador to Singapore, 1966–1969 and Indonesia 1969–1974.

After retiring from the State Department he worked for the Bechtel Corporation, Freeport Indonesia, Weyerhaeuser Company and Intermaritime Management as a consultant on international affairs.

Diplomatic posts
Preceded by Richard H. Donald (as Chargé d'Affaires)	United States Ambassador to Singapore; 1966–1969	Succeeded by Charles T. Cross
Preceded by John M. Allison	United States Ambassador to Indonesia; 1969–1974	Succeeded by Marshall Green
