= Edwin M. Cronk =

American diplomat (1918–2020)

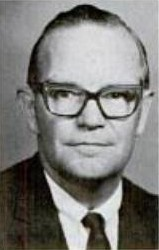
Cronk circa 1972

Edwin Monroe Cronk (May 20, 1918 – September 1, 2020) was an American diplomat who served as the third United States Ambassador to Singapore from 1972 to 1975.

== Biography ==
Cronk was born in Minneapolis, Minnesota, to William F. Cronk and Edith Hanson, where he grew up and graduated from Central High School. He was a Troop #33 Eagle Scout and attended Deep Springs College (class of 1936) and then Cornell University (class of 1941). Cronk married Dorothy Montgomery in 1943. During World War II he served in the Air Force from 1942 to 1946 in the Pacific Theater. As part of the rebuilding of Japan after the War, he became Chief of the Japanese Financial Trade from 1951 to 1956 and was subsequently recruited into the Foreign Service. His tours of duty in the Foreign Service included Korea, Germany, and Australia, with a final assignment as Ambassador to the Republic of Singapore from 1972 to 1975. After his retirement from government service, Cronk accepted the position of Dean and Director of Deep Springs College, his alma mater, where he served from 1976 to 1980 after which he served as a trustee of the college and was chairman of the board for 3 years.

He died in September 2020 at the age of 102.

Diplomatic posts
Preceded by Charles T. Cross	United States Ambassador to Singapore; 1972–1975	Succeeded by John H. Holdridge
