= Cheryl Holdridge =

American actress (1944–2009)

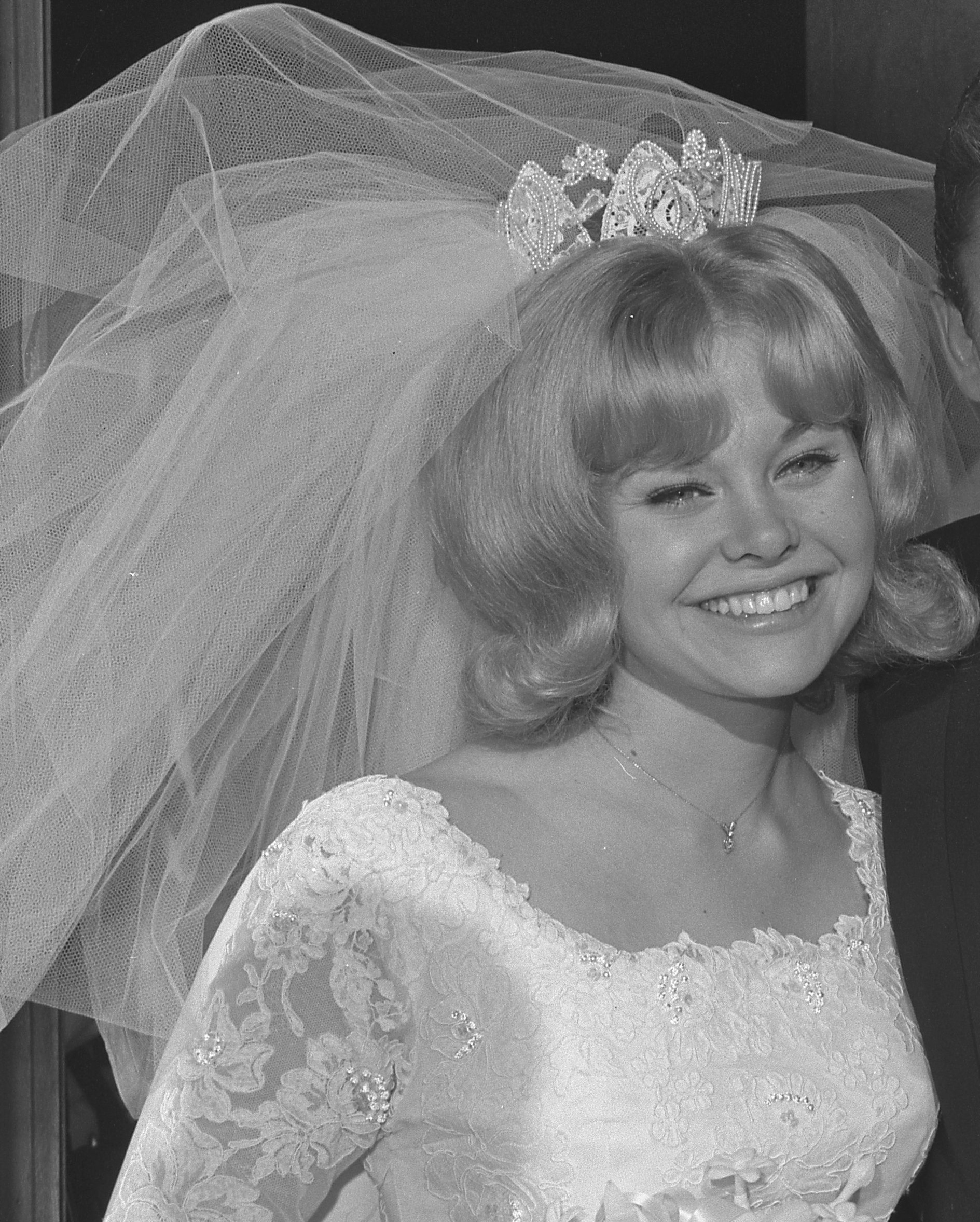
- Holdridge in 1964
- Born: Cheryl Lynn Phelps; June 20, 1944; New Orleans, Louisiana, U.S.
- Died: January 6, 2009 (aged 64); Santa Monica, California, U.S
- Other name: Cheryl Reventlow Post
- Occupation: Actress
- Years active: 1955–2000
- Spouses: Lance Reventlow (m. 1964; died 1972) Albert James Skarda (m. 1974; div. 1988) Manning J. Post (m. 1994; died 2000)
- Parent: Herbert Charles Holdridge (adoptive father)
- Family: John H. Holdridge (adoptive brother)

Cheryl Lynn Holdridge (née Phelps; June 20, 1944 – January 6, 2009) was an American actress, best known as an original cast member of The Mickey Mouse Club.

== Early life ==
Holdridge's mother, Julie, married Herbert Charles Holdridge, a retired Brigadier General. He adopted Cheryl in 1953 and gave her his surname. Her stepbrother was diplomat John H. Holdridge, who served as U.S. Ambassador to Singapore and Indonesia.

== Career ==
Holdridge first performed professionally at the age of nine in the New York City Ballet's version of The Nutcracker in Los Angeles. Her first screen appearance was as an uncredited extra in the 1956 film production of Carousel.

She auditioned for Walt Disney's The Mickey Mouse Club in the spring of 1956, and was hired for the show's second season.

After the show's run ended, Holdridge returned to Van Nuys High School and graduated from Grant High School with the winter 1961 class. She was cast in two episodes of Leave It to Beaver in 1959 as Gloria Cusick; she later played an occasional, recurring role as Wally Cleaver's girlfriend, Julie Foster. She reprised her role as Julie Foster in two guest appearances in The New Leave It to Beaver in 1985 and 1987.

From 1960, Holdridge made guest appearances on over twenty different shows, including The Rifleman, Wagon Train, The Adventures of Ozzie and Harriet, Bachelor Father, My Three Sons, The Eleventh Hour, Bewitched, and The Dick Van Dyke Show.

Holdridge was offered the role of Elly May on The Beverly Hillbillies but her studio would not release her from her contract to accept the role, and lost the lead role in Gidget Goes to Rome to Cindy Carol for looking too mature. Holdridge was also screen tested for a role in Spencer's Mountain that would eventually go to Mimsy Farmer.

Holdridge retired from acting in 1964 to marry race car driver Lance Reventlow, to whom she was wed until his death in 1972. Holdridge was offered a movie contract from Universal Studios but declined after Reventlow proposed. She stated “I had to choose between my career and my personal life. Lance doesn't want me to quit acting, but it wouldn't be right for me to be tied to a studio." In 1967 Holdridge was reported to be planning on writing a book about Barbara Hutton and Reventlow. She watched an installment of Poor Little Rich Girl, based on Hutton, with its producer Lester Persky at his Bel Air home. The book never materialized.

After the death of her third husband, Holdridge made a cameo appearance in the 2000 feature film, The Flintstones in Viva Rock Vegas. In 2005, she appeared at Disneyland for 50th anniversary celebrations of both the opening of the park and The Mickey Mouse Club. She was cast in televised documentary specials about Cary Grant (2005) and Barbara Hutton (2006), and also appeared in a special feature interview for a Disney DVD.

== Personal life ==
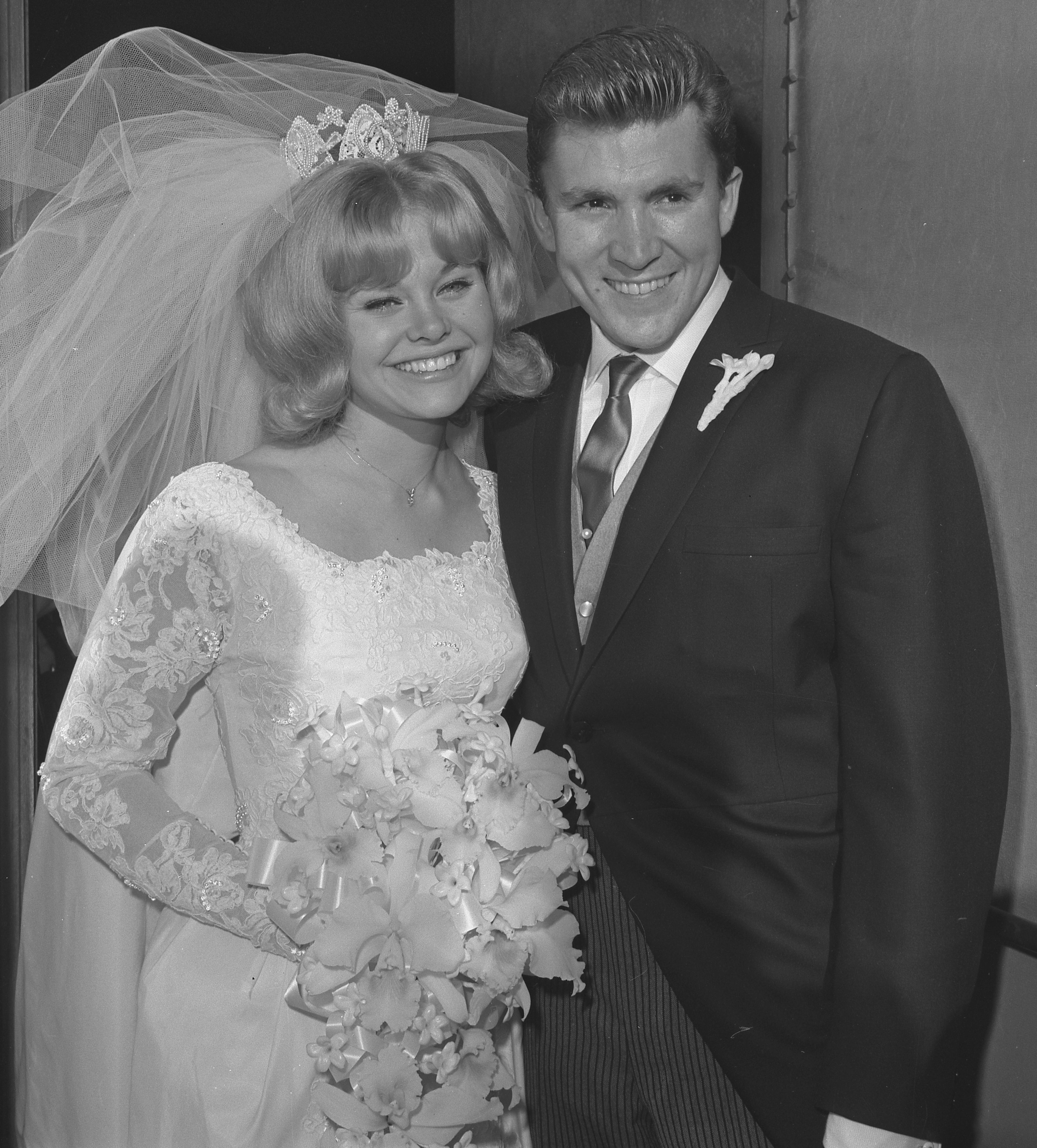
Lance Reventlow and Cheryl Holdridge's wedding portrait

In May 1960, Holdridge went on a live tour to Australia with other former Mouseketeers. While there, she became involved with Lucky Starr, an Australian singer. They met when Starr was 19 and Holdridge was still 15 years old. Starr was quoted as saying he fell in love with her and when the relationship ended, the two remained friends and would write to each other regularly.

Prior to her first marriage, Holdridge had dated Elvis Presley, Tony Dow, Ricky Nelson, Tim Considine, Fabian Forte, Bobby Rydell, Don Grady, Tommy Kirk, and Michael Anderson Jr.

Holdridge's first marriage, on November 8, 1964, was to sportsman and playboy Lance Reventlow, only child of Barbara Hutton, heir to the Woolworth fortune. Holdridge decided to retire from acting after becoming engaged to Reventlow and would later explain “because that’s what you did then. You married and stayed home.” It was reported that towards the end of their marriage the couple were estranged and met only occasionally, with Holdridge contemplating divorce. At an event in 1971, Holdridge refused to be addressed as Mrs. Lance Reventlow and stated "Lance and I are the best of friends. We just don't live together." Reventlow died in 1972, in the crash of a small plane in which he was a passenger in Aspen, Colorado. The bulk of Reventlow's estate went to Holdridge, which was estimated around $50 million.

Between her first two marriages it was reported Holdridge dated film producers Robert Cohn (son of Jack Cohn) and Andrew Wald (son of Jerry Wald), and author Michael Crichton.

Her second husband was Albert James "Jim" Skarda, whom she married in 1974. He ran a car rental service in Aspen. Skarda was indicted for being the ringleader in an international drug smuggling operation. According to a sealed indictment, Skarda put up $100,000 in 1983 to begin importing thousands of pounds of marijuana from Colombia to the United States. Holdridge pledged their Aspen home to pay for his $500,000 bond. They divorced in 1988. She maintained a second home in Aspen and lived there for six months out of the year from the late 1960s to the mid-1990s.

Her third husband, Manning J. Post (1918–2000), a prominent California Democratic Party fundraiser and controller, was 26 years her senior. Post had a used car business before becoming a TV and film producer. Post was then treasurer for the California presidential campaigns of John F. Kennedy and Lyndon B. Johnson and headed the inaugural campaign committee for Jimmy Carter. Post would then go on to be a fundraiser for the political campaigns of Jesse Unruh and Joel Wachs. He died at the age of 82.

== Death ==
Holdridge died at her Santa Monica home on January 6, 2009, from lung cancer, aged 64.

== Filmography ==
Film
Year	Title	Role	Notes
1956	Carousel	Young Girl #2	Uncredited
1959	A Summer Place	Girl in dormitory at Briarwood School for Girls	Uncredited
2000	The Flintstones in Viva Rock Vegas	Genevieve	

Television
Year	Title	Role	Notes
1956–1958	The Mickey Mouse Club	Mouseketeer Cheryl	
1957–1980	The Wonderful World of Disney	Mouseketeer Cheryl	2 episodes
1958	Walt Disney Presents: Annette	Madge Markham	2 episodes
1958	The Eve Arden Show		Episode: "Safari"
1959–1963	Leave It to Beaver	Gloria Cusick; Julie Foster	8 episodes
1960–1961	Bachelor Father	Lila Meredith	4 episodes
1960–1964	My Three Sons	Judy Doucette; Juliet Johnson	3 episodes
1961	Westinghouse Playhouse	Mona Morgan	Episode: "A Date for Buddy"
1961	Bringing Up Buddy	Sharon	Episode: "Buddy and the Teenager"
1962	Life with Archie	Betty	Television pilot
1961–1962	The Adventures of Ozzie and Harriet	Joyce Maynard; Norma Lane	4 episodes
1962	The Rifleman	Sally Walker	Episode: "Young Man's Fancy"
1962	The Many Loves of Dobie Gillis	Daphne Winsett	Episode: "The Big Blunder and Egg Man"
1962	King of Diamonds	Chick Hendricks	Episode: "Rain on Wednesday"
1962	Dennis the Menace	Helen Franklin	Episode: "Dennis' Lovesick Friend"
1962	The Donna Reed Show	Pat Walker	Episode: "Mary, Mary Quite Contrary"
1963	Hawaiian Eye	Mary Anne Sayer	Episode: "Go Steady with Danger"
1963	Ripcord	Angie Carter	Episode: "The Inventor"
1964	The Dick Van Dyke Show	Joan Delroy	Episode: "The Third One from the Left"
1964	Mr. Novak	Betty	Episode: "The Private Life of Douglas Morgan, Jr."
1964	Dr. Kildare	Nurse Reynolds	Episode: "Quid Pro Quo"
1964	The Eleventh Hour	Judy Gormley	3 episodes
1964	Insight	Sally	Episode: "Boss Toad"
1964	Wagon Train	Annabelle	Episode: "The Race Town Story"
1964	Bewitched	Liza Randall	Episode: "The Girl Reporter"
1964	Archie	Betty	Second TV Pilot for Archie
1964	Take Me to Your Leader		Unaired TV Pilot
1984–1987	The New Leave It to Beaver	Julie Foster	2 episodes
