= Bob Herbold =

- Born: July 24, 1942 (age 84); Cincinnati, Ohio, United States
- Education: University of Cincinnati & Case Western Reserve University
- Spouse: Patricia L. Herbold
- Children: 3
- Website: www.bobherbold.com

Robert John Herbold Jr., is an American businessman. He is the retired executive vice president and chief operating officer (COO) of Microsoft Corporation, is the managing director of The Herbold Group, LLC, a consulting business focused on executive training and profitability.

== Biography ==
Herbold received his Bachelor of Science degree from the University of Cincinnati. He also studied at Case Western Reserve University from which he holds both a master's degree in mathematics and a Ph.D. in computer science.

He worked at The Procter & Gamble Company for 26 years, joining Microsoft in 1994 as executive vice president and chief operating officer. He retired in 2001.

He is a regular guest commentator and has appeared on CNBC's Sqwak Box, Power Lunch, Kudlow Report and Fox Business Network. “Inside Microsoft: Balancing Discipline and Creativity,” his article on profitability and agility was published in the January 2002 issue of Harvard Business Review. "China vs. America: Which Is the Developing Country?" was published July 9, 2011 in The Wall Street Journal.

He sits on several non-profit boards, including The Heritage Foundation and the Fred Hutchinson Cancer Research Center. He is an adjunct professor in the business school at Nanyang Technological University in Singapore, and president of The Herbold Foundation, which provides college scholarships to science and engineering students.

Herbold is married to Patricia L. Herbold, the former United States Ambassador to the Republic of Singapore. They have three grown children.

== Bibliography ==
- The Fiefdom Syndrome; The Turf Battles that Undermine Careers and Companies – and How to Overcome Them (Random House, 2004)
- Seduced by Success; How the Best Companies Survive the 9 Traps of Winning (McGraw Hill, 2007)
- What's Holding You Back: 10 Bold Steps that Define Gutsy Leaders (2011)
