= Rafik Mansour =

American diplomat and ambassador

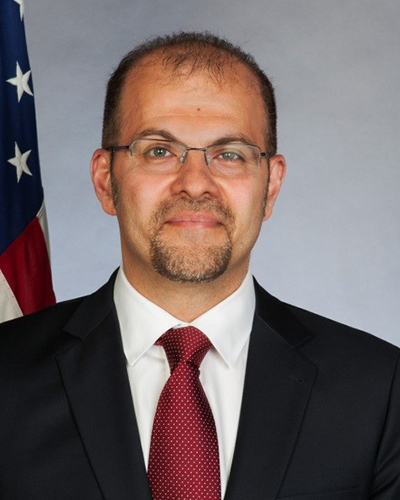

Chargé d'affaires of the U.S. Embassy in Singapore
- In office July 30, 2019 – December 6, 2021
- President: Donald Trump
- Preceded by: Stephanie Syptak-Ramnath
- Succeeded by: Jonathan Kaplan

Personal details
- Education: University of California, Irvine (BS, BA); National War College

Rafik Mansour (Arabic: رفيق منصور) is an American diplomat and Minister-Counselor who served as Chargé d'affaires of the U.S. Embassy in Singapore from 2019 to 2021. He previously served as interim Deputy Chief of Mission and Chargé d'affaires of the U.S. Embassy in Yerevan, Armenia.

== Education ==
Mansour obtained a Bachelor of Science degree in biology and a Bachelor of Arts degree in French literature from the University of California, Irvine, and a master's degree in national security strategy from the National War College.
