= Charles T. Cross =

American career diplomat and ambassador

United States Ambassador to Singapore
- In office 1969–1972
- President: Richard Nixon
- Preceded by: Francis Joseph Galbraith
- Succeeded by: Edwin M. Cronk

Director of American Institute in Taiwan
- In office 1979–1981
- President: Jimmy Carter
- Preceded by: (post created)
- Succeeded by: James R. Lilley

Personal details
- Born: May 4, 1922 Peking, China
- Died: November 3, 2008 (aged 86) Seattle, Washington, U.S.
- Spouse: Shirley Cross
- Children: 3
- Education: Carleton College (B.A.); Yale University (M.A.)
- Occupation: Diplomat

Military service
- Branch/service: Marine Corps
- Battles/wars: World War II

Charles Tenney "Chuck" Cross (May 4, 1922 – November 3, 2008) was an American career diplomat and ambassador who held many positions in American government around the world. He served as the U.S. Consul General in Hong Kong, 1974–1977, and was the second United States Ambassador to Singapore, serving from 1969 to 1972. He served as the first Director of the American Institute in Taiwan from 1979 to 1981, a position which required his retirement from the Foreign Service. In his retirement he lectured at the University of Washington in Seattle.

== Early life and military service ==
Charles Cross was born in Beijing, China, to American missionaries. His mother opened China's first kindergarten in 1919, and his father taught philosophy at Yenching University. Growing up in China, he was personally acquainted with Asian history at a time when most Americans are confined to headlines and history books; he was, for example, an eyewitness as a teenager to the brutal Japanese occupation of China.

Cross attended Carleton College from 1940 to 1942, at which point his college studies were interrupted when he joined the Marines during World War II. After one year at the Navy Japanese Language School at the University of Colorado, he was assigned to the 23rd Marines of the 4th Marine Division as an intelligence officer and Japanese Interpreter. He was with the 23rd for all the division's landings: Roi/Namur, Saipan, Tinian, and Iwo Jima. He was awarded the Bronze Star with Combat V on Saipan. After V-Day in 1945, he joined the First Marine Division in North China, going up to Beijing, thereby taking part in the liberation of his home from the Japanese. In January 1946 he married Shirley Foss of Faribault, MN, who supported him and their family through two more years at Carleton and a master's degree at Yale University.

== Foreign Service career ==
Cross's career in the U.S. Foreign Service spanned thirty two years. He worked in: Taiwan; Indonesia; Hong Kong; Malaysia; Egypt; Cyprus; London; and also as Senior Civilian Deputy to Commanding General, III Marine Amphibious Force for Pacification Operations in I Corps’ in Danang; Ambassador to Singapore; Consul General in Hong Kong; and as the first Director of the American Institute in Taiwan. Scattered throughout these were assignments in the State Department in Washington, which included: Officer in Charge – Burma Affairs and Laos Affairs; National War College; Diplomat-in-Residence, U of Michigan; 1972 Policy Planning Staff; and Senior Foreign Service Inspector, 1978–79.

== Post-Foreign Service ==
After retiring from the Foreign Service, Cross came to Seattle in 1982 to teach at the Jackson School of International Studies and the History Department of the University of Washington, where he taught for ten years. His time in academia also included three voyages of the Semester at Sea program of the University of Pittsburgh, and a quarter as Benedict Distinguished Visiting Professor at Carleton College. While at the Jackson School, he created and taught a course called "Practicing American Foreign Policy", which has subsequently been taught by retired diplomats Ronald Woods and Darryl N. Johnson. His memoir, Born a Foreigner: A Memoir of the American Presence in Asia, was published in 1999. He served on the boards of several non-profit organizations, including the Lingnan Foundation in New York, DACOR in Washington DC, and the Blakemore Foundation in Seattle.

Diplomatic posts
Preceded by Francis Joseph Galbraith (as Chargé d'Affaires)	United States Ambassador to Singapore; 1969–1972	Succeeded by Edwin M. Cronk
Government offices
Preceded by Position established	Director of the American Institute in Taiwan; 1979–1981	Succeeded by James R. Lilley
