= John H. Holdridge =

American diplomat (1924–2001)

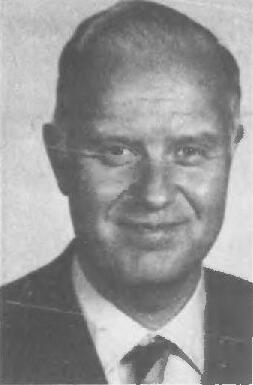

United States Ambassador to Indonesia
- In office February 19, 1983 – January 7, 1986
- President: Ronald Reagan
- Preceded by: John Cameron Monjo (interim)
- Succeeded by: Paul Wolfowitz

15th Assistant Secretary of State for East Asian and Pacific Affairs
- In office May 28, 1981 – December 9, 1982
- President: Ronald Reagan
- Preceded by: Richard Holbrooke
- Succeeded by: Paul Wolfowitz

5th United States Ambassador to the Republic of Singapore
- In office August 5, 1975 – June 9, 1978
- President: Gerald Ford; Jimmy Carter
- Preceded by: Edwin M. Cronk
- Succeeded by: Richard F. Kneip

Personal details
- Born: August 21, 1924 New York City, New York, U.S.
- Died: July 12, 2001 (aged 76) Washington, D.C., U.S.
- Spouse: Martha Holdridge
- Parents: Brigadier General Herbert C. Holdridge (father); Marie Gunther (mother)
- Relatives: Cheryl Holdridge (step-sister)

John Herbert Holdridge (August 21, 1924 – July 12, 2001) was an American foreign service officer and diplomat, who was best known for having taken part in, and later recounted, Henry A. Kissinger's secret 1971 initiative to restore United States diplomatic relations with the People's Republic of China. He also served as U.S. Ambassador to Singapore (1975–1978) and Indonesia (1982–1986).

== Biography ==
=== Early life ===
John Holdridge was born August 21, 1924, in New York City, New York. His parents were Marie Gunther and Herbert C. Holdridge, a West Point graduate who reached the rank of brigadier general in the United States Army. His parents later divorced, and John gained his only sibling, a much younger stepsister, Cheryl Holdridge, after his father remarried.

Holdridge attended Dartmouth College in 1941, but transferred to the US Military Academy at West Point upon the US entry into World War II. After graduation in 1945, he was commissioned an officer in the US Army, and served briefly in Korea. He resigned his commission in 1948, after passing the State Department's foreign service exam. He then began a two-year intensive study of Mandarin at Cornell University and Harvard University.

=== Career ===
John Holdridge's first State Department posting was as US Vice Consul, Embassy of the United States, Bangkok, Thailand, from 1950 to 1953. He was promoted to consul and assigned to first Consulate General Hong Kong (1953–56), then Singapore (1956–58). He returned to Hong Kong in 1962 as chief of the political section, a post he held for four years. From 1966 to 1968 he became deputy director for the office of research and analysis, East Asian and Pacific affairs, the State Department in Washington, D.C., and then director from 1969 to 1973.

With the election of Richard Nixon as President of the United States in 1968, Holdridge became a senior staff member for the Far East of the National Security Council, probably upon the recommendation of Henry Kissinger, the incoming National Security Advisor. Though not involved with domestic politics, Holdridge would be largely identified with Republican administrations and the real politik policies of Kissinger throughout his later career.

While serving on the NSC, Holdridge was selected by Kissinger to help lay the groundwork for diplomatic reproachment between the US and Red China. He accompanied Kissinger on his secret 1971 trip to the Mainland, and helped draft the protocol agreement between Zhou Enlai and Henry Kissinger that marked the beginning of normalized relations. For his services, he was appointed deputy chief of mission in Beijing, China, for 1973–75.

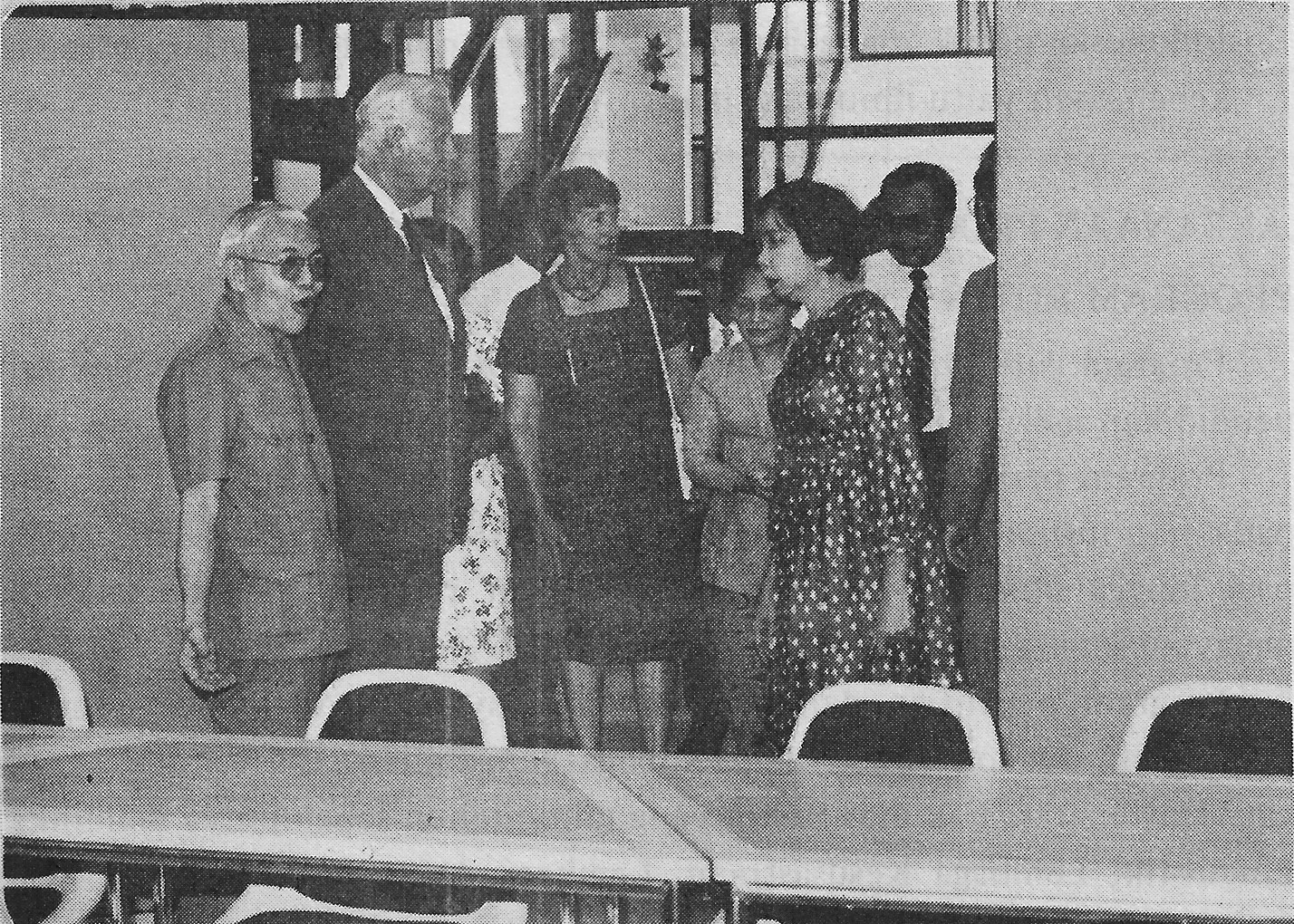
Holdridge (second from left) at the opening of the University of Indonesia's Center for American Studies, 1984

Holdridge was then selected by Gerald R. Ford in 1975 to serve as the fourth United States Ambassador to Singapore. After the election of Jimmy Carter, Holdridge continued to serve in Singapore until 1978. After that, he worked for the Central Intelligence Agency until early 1981 as national intelligence officer for East Asia/Pacific, on details from the State Department. In 1981 he became Assistant Secretary of State of East Asian & Pacific Affairs, then was appointed US Ambassador to Indonesia from 1983 to 1986.

Holdridge is also known for giving the final format for the so-called "Six Assurances" to Taiwan in 1982, formally adopted by the US House of Representatives in 2016.

=== Later life ===
John Holdridge had three children with his wife Martha. After retiring from active service, he wrote a memoir on the restoration of US-China diplomatic relations. He also made occasional appearances as a commentator on Asian political affairs for American television. Holdridge died of pulmonary fibrosis in Washington, D.C., on July 12, 2001.

Government offices
Preceded by Richard Holbrooke	Assistant Secretary of State for East Asian and Pacific Affairs; 1981 – 1982	Succeeded by Paul Wolfowitz
Diplomatic posts
Preceded by Edwin M. Cronk	United States Ambassador to Singapore; 1975–1978	Succeeded by Richard F. Kneip
Preceded by Edward E. Masters	United States Ambassador to Indonesia; 1982–1986	Succeeded by Paul Wolfowitz
