= List of ambassadors of the United States to Singapore =

United States Ambassador to Singapore
- Duta Besar Amerika Syarikat ke Singapura 美国驻新加坡大使 சிங்கப்பூருக்கான அமெரிக்க தூதர்
- Seal of the United States Department of State

- Flag of a United States ambassador

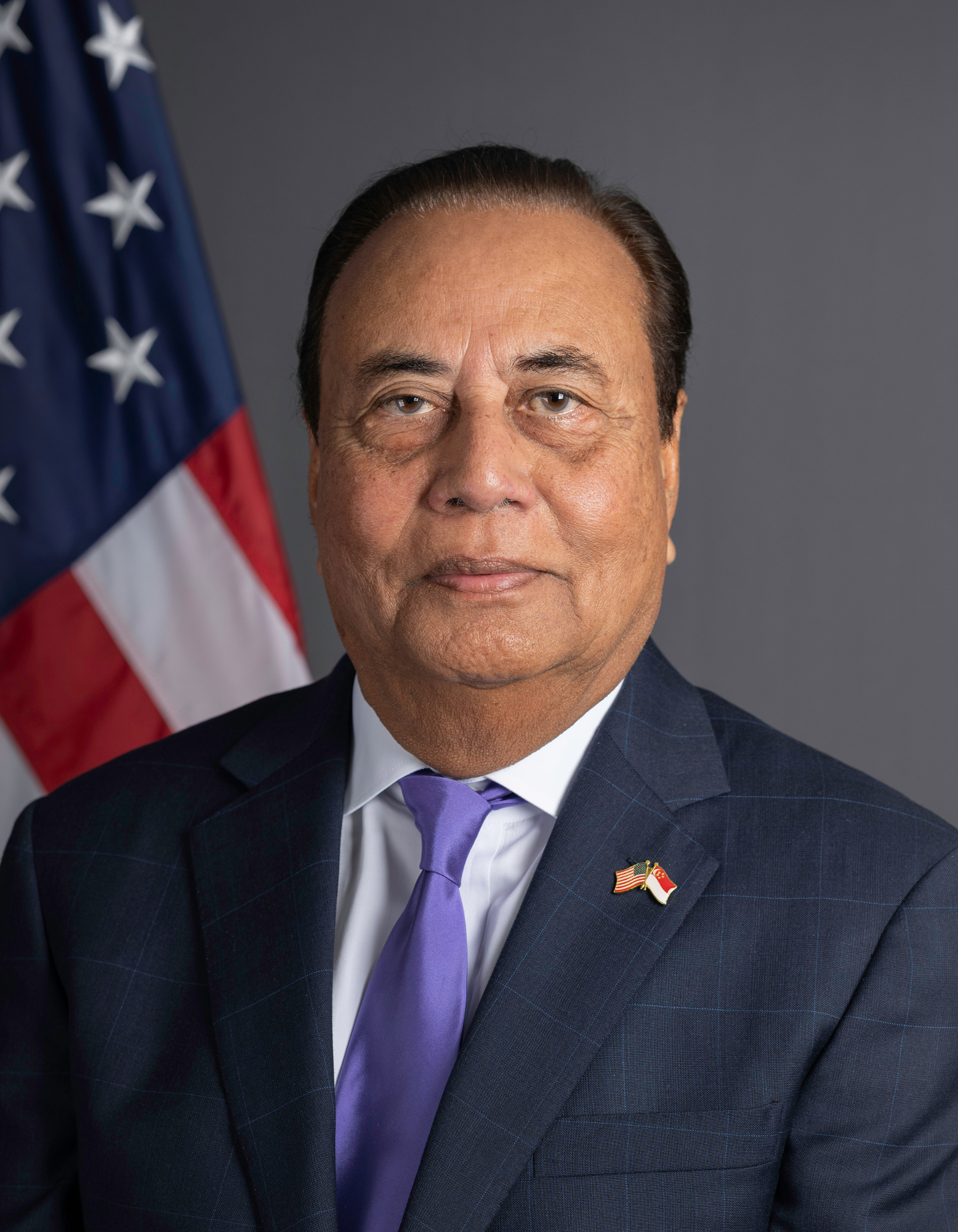
- Incumbent; Anjani Sinha since November 17, 2025
- Department of State
- Reports to: U.S. Secretary of State
- Seat: Singapore
- Nominator: President of the United States
- Appointer: United States Congress
- Term length: No term limit
- Inaugural holder: Richard H. Donald
- Formation: 1966; 60 years ago
- Website: U.S. Embassy – Singapore

The United States ambassador to Singapore is the official representative of the United States of America to the Republic of Singapore. the ambassador of the Embassy of the United States in Singapore is Dr Anjani Sinha.

== List of ambassadors ==
No.	Name	Took office	Left office	President
1	Richard H. Donald (Chargé d'Affaires, a.i.)	April 4, 1966	September 1966	Lyndon B. Johnson
2	Francis Joseph Galbraith	December 8, 1966	July 7, 1969	Lyndon B. Johnson
3	Charles T. Cross	October 10, 1969	November 18, 1971	Richard Nixon
4	Edwin M. Cronk	July 31, 1972	June 7, 1975	Richard Nixon; Gerald Ford
5	John H. Holdridge	August 5, 1975	June 9, 1978	Gerald Ford; Jimmy Carter
6	Richard F. Kneip	August 7, 1978	September 25, 1980	Jimmy Carter
7	Harry E. T. Thayer	December 13, 1980	June 14, 1984	Jimmy Carter; Ronald Reagan
8	J. Stapleton Roy	October 26, 1984	October 4, 1986	Ronald Reagan
9	Daryl Arnold	April 28, 1987	July 8, 1989	Ronald Reagan; George H. W. Bush
10	Robert D. Orr	July 14, 1989	September 12, 1992	George H. W. Bush
11	Jon Huntsman Jr.	September 22, 1992	June 15, 1993	George H. W. Bush; Bill Clinton
12	Ralph L. Boyce (Chargé d'Affaires, a.i.)	June 15, 1993	August 15, 1994	Bill Clinton
13	Timothy Chorba	August 15, 1994	January 7, 1998	Bill Clinton
14	Steven J. Green	January 13, 1998	February 27, 2001	Bill Clinton; George W. Bush
15	Frank Lavin	September 10, 2001	October 11, 2005	George W. Bush
16	Patricia L. Herbold	December 29, 2005	January 20, 2009	George W. Bush
17	Daniel L. Shields (Chargé d'Affaires, a.i.)	January 20, 2009	April 29, 2010	Barack Obama
18	David I. Adelman	April 29, 2010	September 1, 2013	Barack Obama
19	Kirk Wagar	September 25, 2013	January 20, 2017	Barack Obama
20	Stephanie Syptak-Ramnath (Chargé d'Affaires, a.i.)	January 20, 2017	July 26, 2019	Donald Trump
21	Rafik Mansour (Chargé d'Affaires, a.i.)	July 30, 2019	December 6, 2021	Donald Trump
22	Jonathan Kaplan	December 6, 2021	January 20, 2025	Joe Biden
23	Casey Mace (Chargé d'Affaires, a.i.)	January 20, 2025	July 15, 2025	Donald Trump
24	Lisa S. Liao (Chargé d'Affaires, a.i.)	July 16, 2025	August 8, 2025	Donald Trump
25	Graham Mayer (Chargé d'Affaires, a.i.)	August 8, 2025	November 6, 2025	Donald Trump
26	Anjani Sinha	November 17, 2025		Donald Trump

== See also ==
- Singapore–United States relations
- Foreign relations of Singapore
- Ambassadors of the United States
