= Embassy of Singapore, Washington, D.C. =

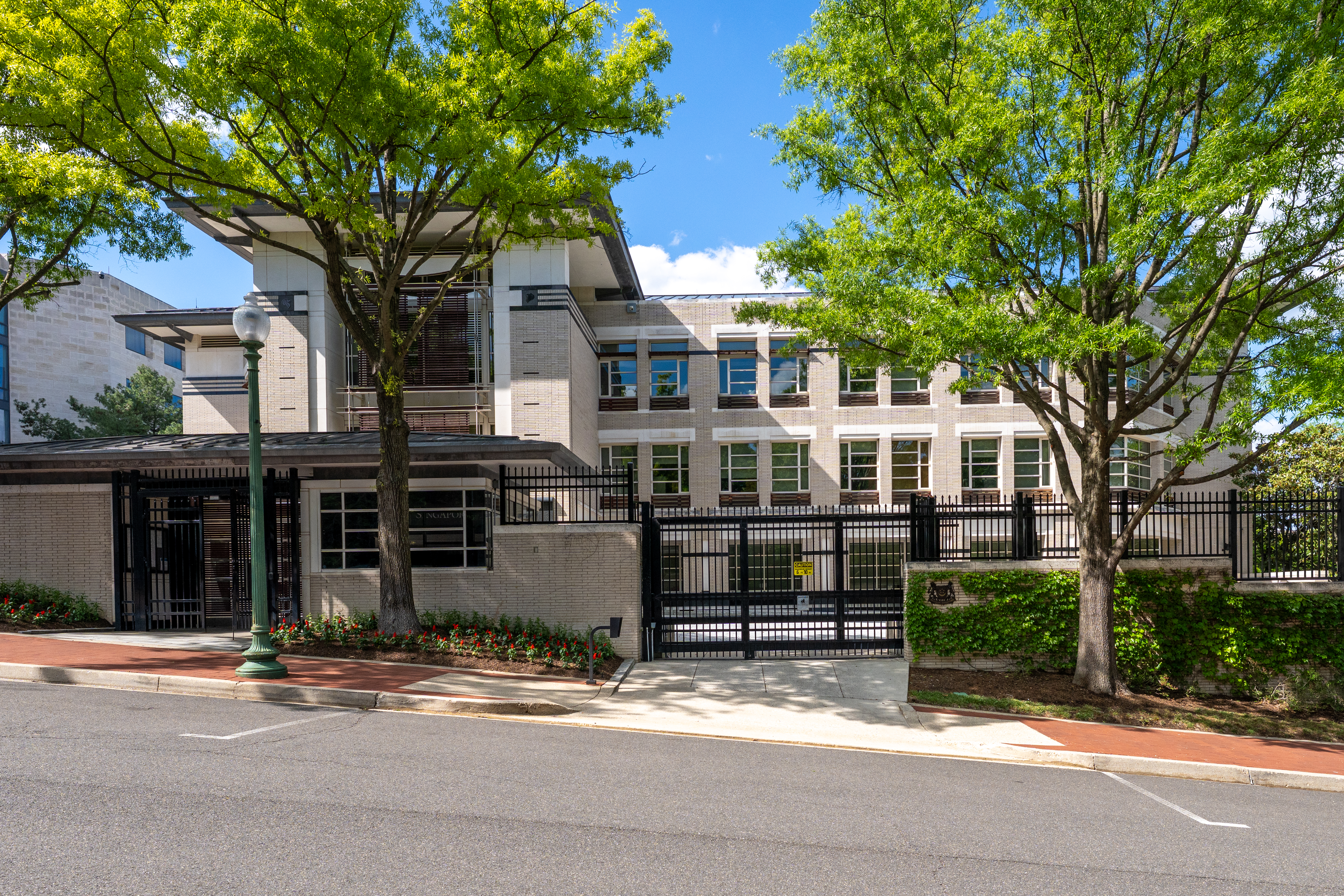
- Location: Washington, D.C.
- Address: 3501 International Place, Northwest, Washington, D.C.
- Coordinates: 38°56′33.8″N 77°3′55.5″W
- Ambassador: Lui Tuck Yew

The Embassy of Singapore, Washington, D.C. is Singapore's main diplomatic mission to the United States. It is located at 3501 International Place Northwest, Washington, D.C.

The embassy also operates consulates-general in San Francisco, New York City, and honorary consulates-general in Miami and Chicago.

The incumbent ambassador since May 2023 is Lui Tuck Yew.

== See also ==
- Singapore–United States relations
- Singapore Ambassador to the United States
