= Herbert C. Holdridge =

United States Army general (1892–1974)

- Holdridge in 1943
- Born: Herbert Charles Heitke; March 6, 1892; Wyandotte, Michigan, U.S.
- Died: September 29, 1974 (aged 82); Toledo, Ohio, U.S.
- Children: John H. Holdridge; Cheryl Holdridge (adoptive father)
- Military career
- Allegiance: United States of America
- Branch: United States Army
- Service years: 1917–1944
- Rank: Brigadier General
- Commands: Commandant, The Adjutant General's School, Ft Washington, Maryland; Director, Schools Training, Army Administration Schools
- Conflicts: World War II

Herbert Charles Holdridge (March 6, 1892 – September 29, 1974) was an American military officer and presidential candidate. He reached the rank of brigadier general in the United States Army during World War II before retiring in May 1944. In retirement, Holdridge was active politically, and unsuccessfully sought presidential nominations in 1948, 1952, and 1956.

== Biography ==
=== Early life ===
Holdridge was born Herbert Charles Heitke on March 6, 1892, in Wyandotte, Michigan. His parents were German immigrants Emil Heitke and Ida Petzke, who came to the United States in 1881. Herbert Heitke grew up on the family farm, along with his four brothers and three sisters. He was able to secure an appointment to the United States Military Academy at West Point, and graduated with the class of April 1917, after the American entry into World War I, 55th in a class of 139. While at West Point, he legally changed his surname to "Holdridge", a move precipitated by the rising anti-German sentiment in America during its entry into World War I. Upon graduation, he married Marie Gunther (1896–1981), a New York factory worker's daughter.

=== Military career ===
Holdridge was commissioned a second lieutenant in the U.S. Army in 1917, and assigned to the Quartermaster Corps of the Army's Reserve (II Corps) at Camp Gordon, Georgia. He was promoted to first lieutenant by 1920, and made captain two years later, at which time he was assigned to duty with Headquarters Army Trains, with the First United States Army in New York City. This move reunited him with his wife, who had remained behind in New York after his posting to Georgia, and led to the birth in 1924 of their only child, John H. Holdridge.

By 1925, Holdridge had transferred to the Cavalry, while still assigned to the Reserve Corps in New York. He was later appointed as assistant professor of History and Social Sciences at West Point, and also taught summer sessions at Columbia University during 1928. Before 1930, Holdridge had been transferred to the Army's Cavalry School at Fort Riley, Kansas, his wife and son this time accompanying him.

Holdridge remained with Training Commands for the rest of his Army career. He was promoted to colonel and headed the Plans Training Division of the Adjutant General's Department at the onset of World War II, and was assigned as commandant of the Adjutant General School at Fort Washington, Maryland, on January 19, 1942. He also became director, schools training, Army Administration Schools, and was promoted to brigadier general in early 1942. In this position, Holdridge was responsible for implementing the opening of Officer Candidate Schools at colleges around the country, to provide twelve-week courses of instruction for the massive increase in the US Army's officer corps during 1942–1944. Holdridge saw that many of these schools were opened at smaller public and private colleges and universities that had been hard hit by loss of students to military service, helping to ensure their financial viability during the war years. For his efforts, he was awarded a Doctor of Laws degree by Grinnell College on January 24, 1943. Holdridge retired in May 1944.

=== Political career ===
Within six months of having retired, Holdridge gave a speech at a Socialist Party meeting in New York City, decrying the ideas of the two presidential contenders, Franklin D. Roosevelt and Thomas E. Dewey. Holdridge was quoted as saying:

In electing Dewey, instead of Roosevelt, you don't change horses in the middle of the stream, you merely change jockeys of the same old capitalistic horse, both competing for the privilege of leading the country into Fascism.

Unexpected as this opinion might be coming from a recently retired general, it at least expressed a fairly orthodox Socialist position. From this point on, however, Holdridge's public statements would become increasingly unorthodox and inconsistent, reflecting no coherent ideological basis. Opposition to mental health reform and the Roman Catholic Church, commitment to pacifism, and championship of returning Native American tribes to government by traditional chieftains, were among the few positions that he did hold consistently over the years.

==== 1948 presidential election ====
Notwithstanding his support for the Socialist ticket in 1944, Holdridge put himself forth as a candidate for the Democratic Party presidential nomination in 1948. His candidacy was brought to an abrupt halt over a lawsuit Holdridge filed against then Representative John E. Rankin (D) of Mississippi. Holdridge filed for defamation of character, claiming Rankin had slandered him in comments made to a reporter in a Congressional cloakroom during 1946. A Federal District judge ruled against Holdridge, saying that such a conversation, in person, and within the Capitol building, was immune to lawsuit.

==== 1952 presidential election ====
In February 1952, Holdridge was selected as the provisional presidential candidate for the "American Rally for Peace, Abundance and the Constitution" AKA the American Rally Party, a splinter group that was seeking to take-over the Democratic nominating convention later that summer. Three months later, Holdridge was also lobbying to be selected as the candidate for president on the American Vegetarian Party ticket. Holdridge, as reported in the press, promised:

In the White House, I would obtain the best vegetarian chef in the country to cook such delicious vegetarian meals that guests would wonder why they ever thought meat edible.

At the Democratic Convention in July 1952, Holdridge sought to contest that state's pledging of delegates to Estes Kefauver. His attempt to replace twenty of the Kefauver delegates with his own Rally group was turned aside, the convention perhaps being alarmed by Holdridge's pledge to elevate the Department of Commerce to a branch of government in itself, equal to the executive, legislative, and judicial branches. The American Vegetarian Party also rejected Holdridge, instead nominating Daniel J. Murphy for President in 1952.

==== 1956 presidential election ====
Embittered by his double rejection, Holdridge himself resigned from the American Rally on November 5, 1952, claiming that it was being devoted to "Marxist principles". He returned to California and started "The Holdridge Foundation" out of his home in Sherman Oaks. In 1953, he used donations to it to publish his book of political allegory, The Fables of Moronia. Later that year, he announced to reporters that he wanted to talk to American GIs held by the North Koreans, who had refused repatriation, and that he had written to his old classmate, then President Dwight D. Eisenhower, about it. This was one of the earliest of what would soon become a Holdridge trademark event; writing a public letter to a well-known figure about a controversial issue, then calling a press conference about it.

In 1955, Holdridge again sought a nomination, this time as a vice-presidential candidate for the Prohibition Party. Placed on the ticket in September 1955, with law professor Enoch A. Holtwick as the nominee for president, Holdridge was replaced in August 1956 by Edwin M. Cooper, after Holdridge distributed virulently anti-Eisenhower pamphlets on the floor of the Republican Party nominating convention.

Holdridge punctuated his non-election year with a fracas at a House Un-American Activities Committee hearing held in Los Angeles on December 7, 1956. Representative Clyde Doyle, a California Democrat, had Holdridge removed from the building after the two exchanged heated personal insults during the hearing.

=== Later life ===
Despite having failed to secure a presidential nomination from even minor national parties in three different elections over a dozen years, Holdridge would always claim to have been nominated by the Vegetarians and the Prohibitionists, an achievement of such ephemeral value that no reporter ever questioned it. After 1956 he never again sought a nomination from established political parties. Instead, he devoted his efforts to nascent movements designed to empower American Indians, and to anti-Catholic propaganda against the 1960 presidential campaign of John F. Kennedy.

Holdridge founded the "Minute Men for the Constitution" in 1957. In 1960, he established the "Constitutional Provisional Government of the United States", which claimed the Hopi Indians were still a sovereign nation, since they had never signed a peace treaty with the United States. Holdridge appointed himself to represent the Hopi in this matter, albeit without attracting any members of that tribe to his organization.

Holdridge and his first wife Marie divorced in the 1940s. He married a former dancer named Julie Phelps (19 October 1908 – 24 October 2003), and adopted her daughter Cheryl. His political activities and incessant writing of public letters to newspapers and elected officials would prove a minor embarrassment to his stepdaughter's acting career. Meanwhile, his son, John H. Holdridge, pursued a diplomatic career.

By the early 1960s, Holdridge had become estranged from his second wife and their daughter. Holdridge was not invited to the latter's wedding to Woolworth heir Lance Reventlow in November 1964, and shortly thereafter, moved to Toledo, Ohio. His principal occupation during the last years of his life was trying to keep alive his Hopi government project, which was rendered futile by his inability to attract either funding or supporters. Holdridge died at the Veteran's Administration Hospital in Brecksville, Ohio, on September 29, 1974.
