= Anjani Sinha =

American orthopaedic surgeon and diplomat

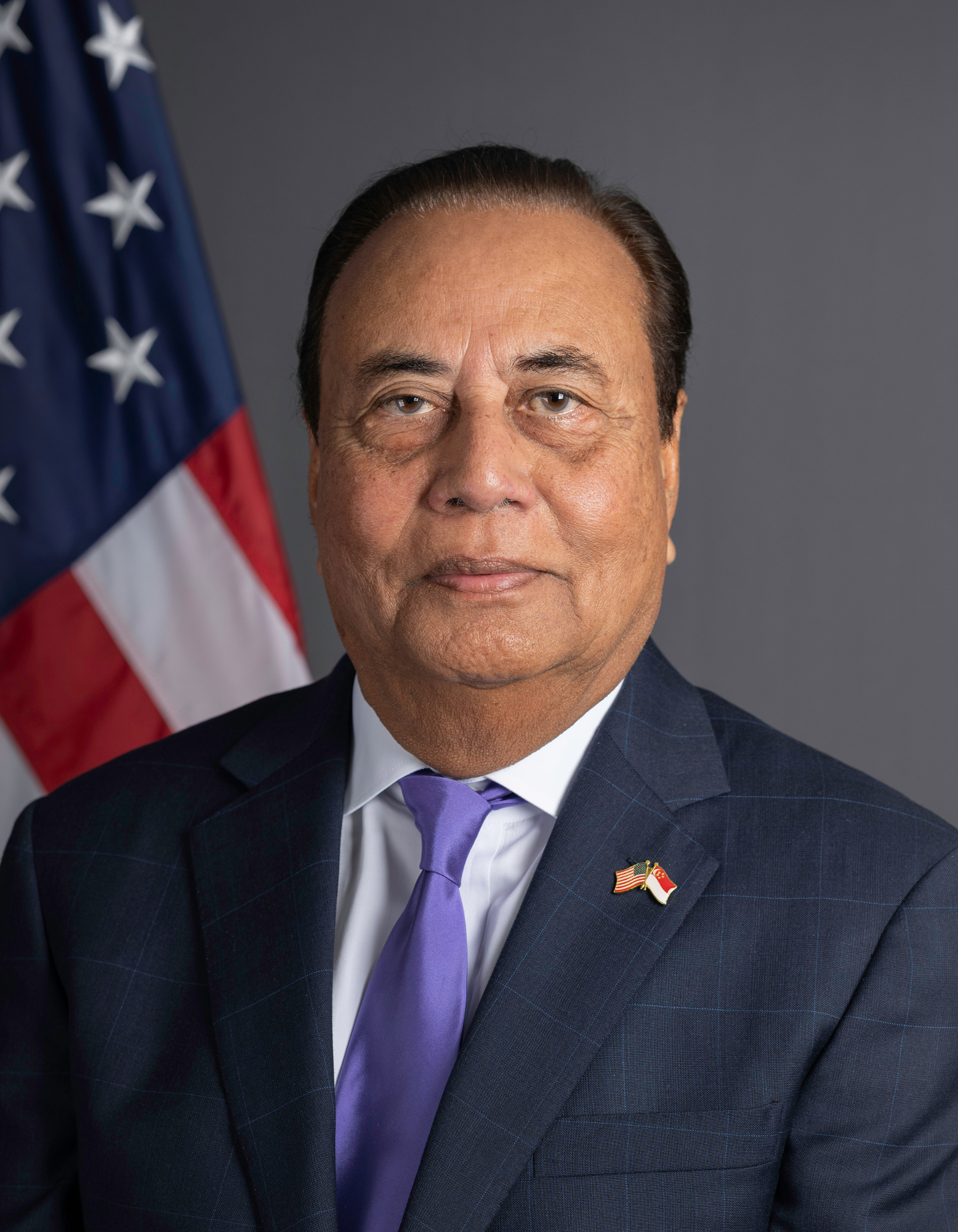
- Official portrait, 2025

United States Ambassador to Singapore
- Incumbent
- Assumed office November 17, 2025
- President: Donald Trump
- Preceded by: Jonathan E. Kaplan

Personal details
- Born: 1949 (age 76–77) India
- Spouse: Kiki Sinha
- Children: 2
- Education: MGM Medical College (MBBS); Delhi University (MS)
- Occupation: Orthopedic surgeon • Diplomat

Anjani Sinha (born 1949) is an American orthopaedic surgeon and diplomat who has been the United States Ambassador to Singapore since 2025.

== Early life and education ==
Sinha was born in Bihar, India. He received medical degrees from MGM Medical College and Delhi University. He immigrated to the US in 1977 and worked in sports medicine.

== Career ==
=== US Ambassador to Singapore ===
Sinha was nominated by President Donald Trump in March 2025.

On July 9, 2025, the Senate Foreign Relations Committee held a confirmation hearing for Sinha. During the hearing, he was criticized by Senator Tammy Duckworth as "unqualified" for his responses to questions about Singapore, its relationship with the United States, and its role within ASEAN.

Videos from Sinha's confirmation hearing were widely covered by Southeast Asian newspapers.

On October 7, his appointment as ambassador was confirmed by a 51-47 simple majority in an en bloc vote. Sinha arrived to Singapore on November 6 and he presented his credentials to President of Singapore on November 17, 2025.

== Personal life ==
Sinha is married to Kiki Sinha, an Indian-born retired anesthesiologist who worked at New York University. They have two children and three grandchildren.

Sinha, who has practised in New York and Florida, is believed to be close to the Trump family. Sinha is believed to be a member of the Trump International Golf Club in South Florida.

=== Political activities ===
Sinha has reportedly donated to candidates, parties, and Political Action Committees (PACs) since 1989, including around US$4,500 (S$6,000) to the Trump 2024 campaign. In February 2025, Sinha donated $1 million to MAGA Inc., a Trump-aligned super PAC.

Diplomatic posts
Preceded by Jonathan E. Kaplan	United States Ambassador to Singapore; 2025–present	Incumbent
