= Jonathan E. Kaplan =

American entrepreneur

Jonathan Kaplan
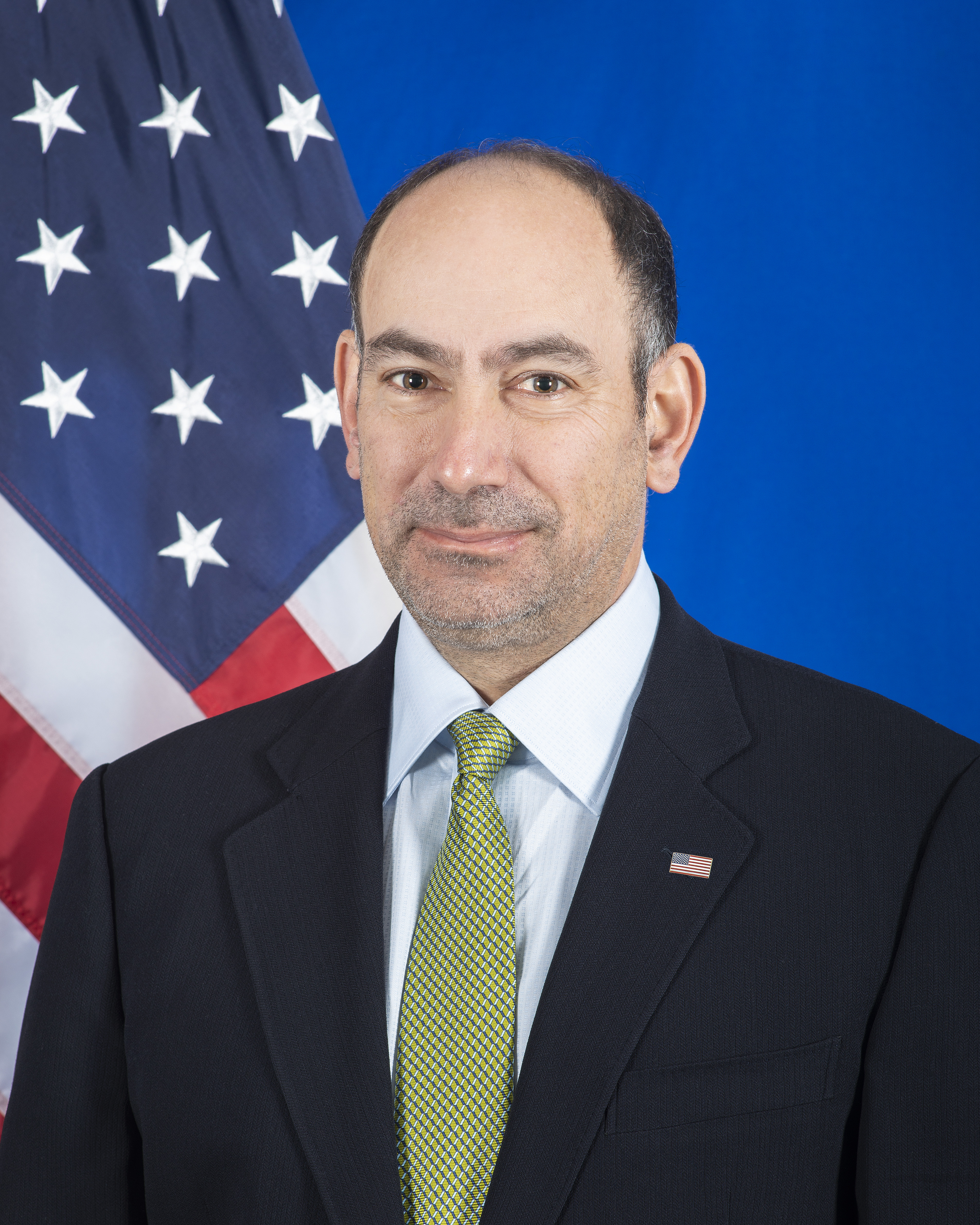

United States Ambassador to Singapore
- In office December 6, 2021 – January 20, 2025
- President: Joe Biden
- Preceded by: Rafik Mansour
- Succeeded by: Casey Mace (Chargé d'Affaires, a.i.)

Personal details
- Born: Jonathan Eric Kaplan
- Education: Carnegie Mellon University (BS)
- Jonathan E. Kaplan's voice Kaplan's opening statement at his confirmation hearing to be United States ambassador to Singapore; Recorded October 20, 2021

Jonathan Eric Kaplan is an American entrepreneur who served as the United States ambassador to Singapore from 2021 to 2025. Kaplan was previously the chair of EducationSuperHighway, a non-profit organization based in San Francisco.

== Education ==
Kaplan earned a Bachelor of Science degree in business administration and industrial management from Carnegie Mellon University.

== Career ==
=== Corporate career ===
After graduating from college, Kaplan worked for Condé Nast. He was later the vice president and general manager of Geoworks. He was also the founder and CEO of MovieStreet. Kaplan was the president and CEO of Sega.com and was the chairperson and CEO of Pure Digital Technologies. In his role, Kaplan invented and marketed the Flip Video before the company was acquired and shuttered by Cisco Systems. Most recently, Kaplan was the chairperson and CEO of the FishSix Restaurant Corporation, a holding company that owns several grilled cheese sandwich restaurants in California, Texas, and Colorado.

=== United States ambassador to Singapore ===
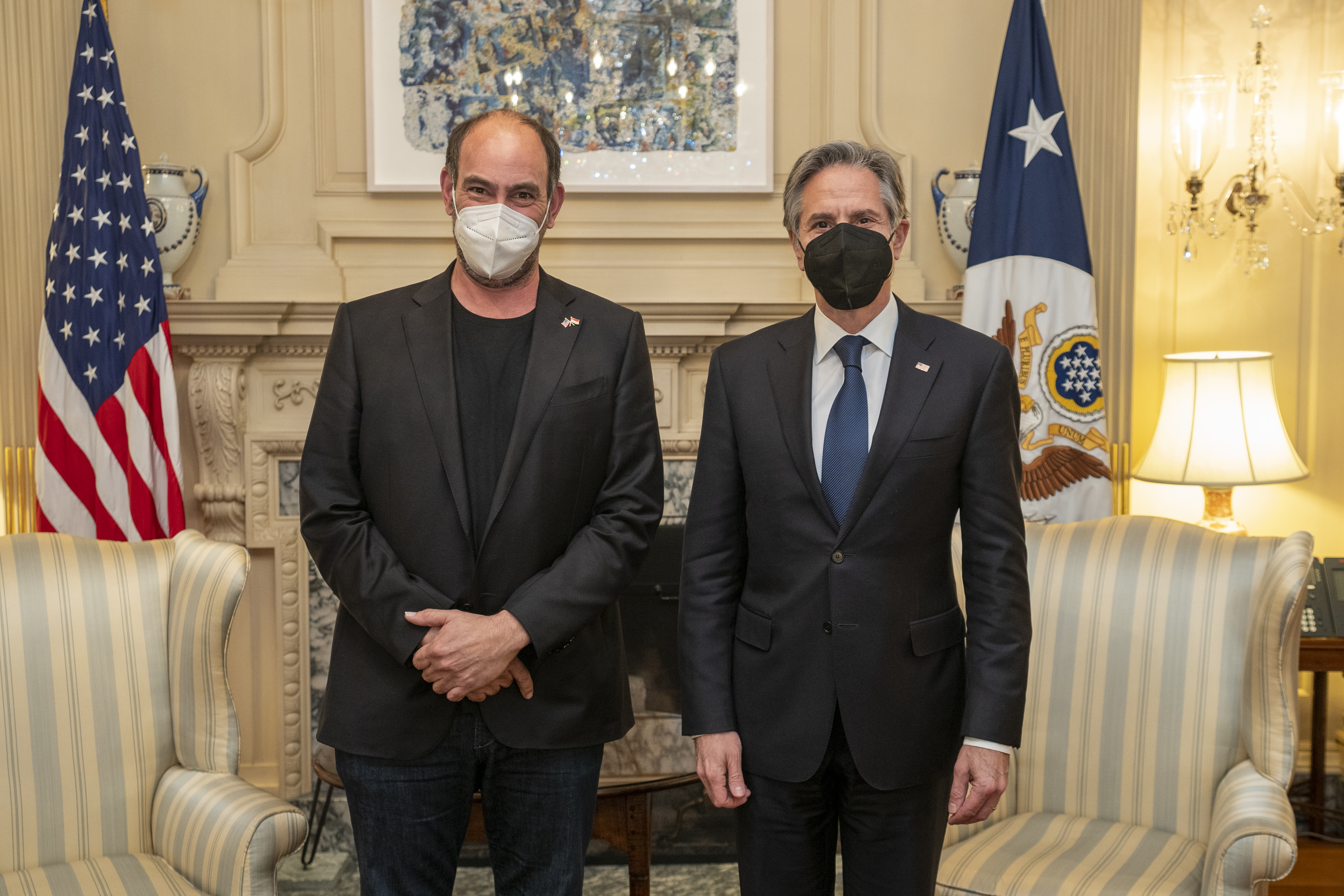
Kaplan with U.S. Secretary of State Antony Blinken in January 2022

On July 29, 2021, President Joe Biden nominated Kaplan to be the next United States ambassador to Singapore. The Senate Foreign Relations Committee held hearings on his nomination on October 20, 2021. The committee favorably reported Kaplan's nomination to the Senate floor on November 3, 2021. The entire Senate confirmed his nomination on November 19, 2021. On December 6, 2021, he presented his credentials to President Halimah Yacob. In February 2024, the Department of State released a watchdog report suggesting that Kaplan mistreated staff, wasted funds and had a poor relationship with local officials while in Singapore.

Diplomatic posts
Preceded by Rafik Mansour	United States Ambassador to Singapore; 2021–2025	Succeeded by Anjani Sinha
