= David I. Adelman =

American politician

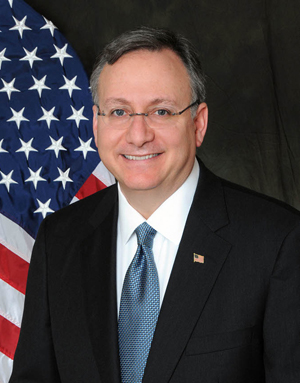

United States Ambassador to Singapore
- In office April 29, 2010 – September 1, 2013
- President: Barack Obama
- Preceded by: Patricia Herbold
- Succeeded by: Kirk Wagar

Member of the Georgia State Senate from the 42nd district
- In office January 13, 2003 – March 19, 2010
- Preceded by: Mike Polak
- Succeeded by: Jason Carter

Personal details
- Born: David Isaac Adelman; May 24, 1964 (age 62) New York City, New York, U.S.
- Party: Democratic
- Spouse: Caroline Aronovitz
- Children: 3
- Education: University of Georgia (BA); Emory University (JD); Georgia State University (MPA)

David Isaac Adelman (born May 24, 1964) is an American businessman, lawyer and diplomat. He was the United States Ambassador to the Republic of Singapore from April 2010 to September 2013. Adelman is the Managing Director and General Counsel of asset manager Krane Funds Advisors in New York. He is a Trustee of the National Committee on American Foreign Policy and a member of the Council on Foreign Relations.

Adelman teaches international relations as an adjunct professor at New York University. His official papers are part of the collection at the Richard B. Russell Library at the University of Georgia. In 2016, in recognition of his public service the State of Georgia dedicated a bridge as the Ambassador David Adelman Bridge on State Highway 42. Adelman is a member of the Advisory Council of the Israel-Asia Center.

== Early life, education and academia ==
Adelman was born in New York City on May 24, 1964. He attended The Lovett School in Atlanta, Georgia. He received a bachelor's degree from the University of Georgia in 1986, a Juris Doctor from Emory University in 1989 and a masters degree from Georgia State University in 1995. He was recognized with a Henry Grady Fellowship by the University of Georgia Henry W. Grady College of Journalism and Mass Communication. He received the Emory Medal which is the highest award given by Emory University.

For three years Adelman taught in the Honors Program in the School of Public and International Affairs at the University of Georgia. He currently is an adjunct professor at New York University in the Program in International Relations where he teaches graduate level courses on the Asia-Pacific region. Georgia State University honored Adelman with its Distinguished Alumni Award. He was the commencement speaker at the University of Georgia in 2010. Adelman served as a member of the Board of Visitors of Emory University. He served as a member of the Board of Visitors of the School of Public and International Affairs at the University of Georgia. Adelman was a member of the Andrew Young School of Policy Studies' Dean's Council. He was a member of the Advisory Board of the Southeast Asia Program at the Center for Strategic and International Studies a Washington, DC–based think tank.

== Legal and business career ==
After graduating from the Emory University School of Law in 1989, Adelman served for two years as an Assistant Attorney General for the State of Georgia. In 1993, Adelman joined the law firm of Sutherland Asbill & Brennan where he became one of the firm's youngest partners.

Adelman was appointed by the Georgia Supreme Court to the Georgia Commission on Children, Marriage and Family. He served on numerous State Bar of Georgia Committees and was a leader in the effort to provide pro bono services to disabled veterans through the National Veterans Consortium Pro Bono Program. For many years he represented indigent veterans before the United States Court of Appeals for Veterans Claims.

In 2000, Adelman was appointed to serve as a Trustee of the Fulton-DeKalb Hospital Authority where he oversaw Georgia's largest hospital, Grady Memorial Hospital, and Hughes Spalding Children's Hospital. Adelman was part of a small team of attorneys led by Harvard Law School Professor Laurence Tribe who represented Vice President Al Gore and Senator Joseph Lieberman before the 11th Circuit Court of Appeals and U.S. Supreme Court in the litigation arising from the 2000 presidential election. In 2017, Emory's School of Law named Adelman to the "Emory Law 100" which recognized the top 100 graduates and faculty members during the school's first century for their contributions to advancing the rule of law and the legal profession.

Adelman was an Independent Non-Executive Director of Noble Group Holdings for approximately three years after the company's 2018 restructuring. He was a senior advisor to Israel-focused indexing firm BlueStar Indexes prior to its sale to Van Eck in 2020. Adelman was a Managing Director of Goldman Sachs in Hong Kong for several years during which he served in the firm's Executive Office. He is an Advisor to private equity firm Olympus Capital and formerly was a Senior Advisor to venture capital firm Ion Pacific. He is a member of the Advisory Board of Climate Finance Partners. Before joining Krane Funds Advisors, for six years he was a partner in the law firm Reed Smith LLP where he worked from the firm's New York and Hong Kong offices. In 2013, Adelman was appointed by the Singapore government to the Monetary Authority of Singapore's Capital Markets Committee which is an advisory group and by the Hong Kong government to the Executive Board of the Treasury Markets Association. Adelman was also a member of the Board of Governors of the American Chamber of Commerce in Hong Kong. He is a member of the Council on Foreign Relations.

== Georgia State Senate ==
In 2002, Adelman was elected to the Georgia State Senate. In that role, Adelman served as Minority Whip and as Chairman of the Senate Urban Affairs Committee. During his eight years as a State Senator, Adelman introduced bills to improve government ethics, increase investments in renewable energy, expand stem-cell research, fight domestic violence, and streamline Georgia's corporate code. He served in the Senate until 2010 when he was confirmed as 15th U.S. Ambassador to Singapore. In 2002, In 2003, Adelman authored Georgia's post-conviction DNA testing law.

After the 2004 court ordered redistricting of Georgia's legislative districts, Adelman was re-elected to the newly configured 42nd District and was chosen by his colleagues to be minority whip. He authored the Family Violence Shelter Protection Act of 2004. He was a champion of promoting transparency in government and public-private partnerships authoring numerous open meetings and open records legislation. He was recognized as a moderate dealmaker who supported business interests as well as progressive causes. Each year he authored and passed legislation which streamlined Georgia's corporate code.

Following the 2006 election, Adelman became chairman of the Senate Urban Affairs Committee and was the only Democrat to chair a committee in the heavily Republican Georgia legislature. In 2006, Adelman was praised by First Amendment advocates when on the final day of the legislative session he passed a law which required public disclosure of college and university police reports and statistics.

In 2009, in response to the Darfur genocide, Adelman authored a bi-partisan law that sanctioned investments in business with ties to the Sudanese government. The law prohibited government entities from entering into contracts with companies maintaining Sudanese business ties. The bill gained overwhelming bi-partisen support.

Adelman was recognized by the Partnership Against Domestic Violence with its Hearts of Hope Award and by the Women's Resource Center to End Domestic Violence with its Champions for Change Award for his accomplishments combating domestic violence. Adelman's leadership on climate change issues was recognized when he was invited by the government of the United Kingdom to serve as an American delegate to a climate change program in London. He also led a trade mission of business leaders to Israel seeking high tech investment. Adelman was selected as Legislator of the Year in 2007 by the Georgia Bio Life Sciences Partnership for his leadership on stem cell research. He received awards from the Georgia Chapter of the National Federation for the Blind, the League of Conservation Voters, Young Democrats of Georgia, Georgia Equality and the Georgia Chamber of Commerce.

== 2008 presidential campaign ==
Adelman's endorsement was highly sought after in the early days of the 2008 presidential campaign. He was known as a moderate, who could build support across political constituencies. He became a supporter of Barack Obama's campaign for the presidency. Adelman also had ties to Bill and Hillary Clinton which continued into his time as U.S. Ambassador. Adelman and his wife Caroline campaigned for Democrats in multiple states. Adelman became Obama's Campaign Chairman in Georgia, and Caroline Adelman would later serve as the official spokesperson for Obama's Georgia general election campaign, a role she had also filled for President Bill Clinton's Georgia campaign.

== U.S. Ambassador to Singapore ==
In 2009, Adelman was nominated to serve as U.S. Ambassador to Singapore. He was unanimously confirmed by the U.S. Senate in 2010 and held the post until late 2013. As Ambassador, Adelman was recognized for his effectiveness in promoting trade and investment, both from U.S. companies to Asia and Asia-based companies to the United States. He led eight U.S. trade missions to India, Indonesia, Malaysia, Myanmar (formerly Burma) and Vietnam. His 2012 trade mission to Naypyidaw, the capital of Myanmar, was the first by an American business delegation and helped bolster the fledgling democratically elected government. He resigned from service as U.S. Ambassador to Singapore in 2013. That year he was named Managing Director by Goldman Sachs based in Hong Kong where he had responsibilities throughout the Asia-Pacific region. He is a former partner of law firm Reed Smith where his practice focused on commercial transactions in Asia. In 2009, As ambassador, Adelman was praised for strengthening cultural and commercial ties between Singapore (and its neighbors in Southeast Asia) and the United States. During his tenure, he led eight regional trade missions including missions to Burma (Myanmar), India, Indonesia, Malaysia and Vietnam. Also during his tenure, U.S. direct foreign investment in Singapore totaled $116 billion, an all-time high.

In 2011, under Adelman's leadership the U.S. Embassy in Singapore received the global award for promoting the National Export Initiative. Adelman successfully worked to make Singapore a party to the Hague Convention on International Child Abductions and the countries signed the U.S.–Singapore Preventing and Combating Serious Crime Agreement. Additionally, the two countries entered into a Memorandum of Understanding to collaborate on education issues. During Adelman's tenure as U.S. Ambassador, the number of Singapore students studying in American universities reached an all-time high and more American researchers, students and artists worked in Singapore than at any other time in history.

A longtime champion of America's National Export Initiative, Adelman aggressively promoted American exports to Asia, leading missions to India, Indonesia, Malaysia, Myanmar and Vietnam made up of America's leading businesses. Adelman oversaw a 20% increase in U.S. direct foreign investment in Singapore reaching more than $116 billion in cumulative investment in 2011.

In 2011 Adelman was recognized in The Wall Street Journal for his "heroic lobbying" in support of the APEC Business Travel Card, which would give American business travelers expedited visa processing rights at foreign embassies and access to immigration processing at international airports.

In 2012, Adelman led the first American business mission in history to Naypyidaw, the capital city of Myanmar. Later that year he was recognized with the Gold Standard Award for Diplomatic Engagement for his work promoting American exports. In 2013, he initiated the U.S. Embassy Singapore Alumni Mentoring Program. The program aims to strengthen bilateral ties and empowers the next generation of Singaporean leaders by leveraging a global network of accomplished alumni as role models.

In August 2012, the Office of the Inspector General of the U.S. Department of State specifically recognized his leadership of the embassy in Singapore, citing American policy makers calling his regional approach to trade promotion "extremely innovative". The Inspector General praised Adelman for his efforts to promote investment from Asia into the United States and the establishment of the U.S.–Singapore Strategic Partnership Dialogue. The report notes that "[a]gency heads with regional perspectives told inspectors they considered the Ambassador one of the most effective and dynamic embassy executives in the field." The report further stated that "American staff gave the Ambassador very good marks in leadership and management capabilities, reporting that vision, coordination and problem solving are his greatest strengths." The report also describes Adelman's outreach to the local business community and institutions as "thoughtfully designed and well executed".

Adelman's managerial techniques were also singled out, noting that even employees who spend much of their time outside Singapore demonstrated a firm grasp of the objectives and expectations of the ambassador and embassy's team. In 2013, Adelman was awarded the U.S. State Department Superior Honor award for his diplomatic leadership.

As Ambassador, Adelman successfully negotiated the terms under which Singapore agreed for the first time to allow forward deployment to Changi Naval Base of US Navy ships. The USS Freedom (LCS-1) arrived in Singapore on April 18, 2013. For this achievement, Adelman received the United States Navy Distinguished Public Service Award, the highest award granted by the US Navy to non-military personnel.

In 2013, Adelman resigned his position and returned to the private sector joining the firm Goldman Sachs as managing director leading a team in the executive office of the firm in Hong Kong, and later becoming a partner in the law firm Reed Smith LLP. working in the firm's New York office and regularly traveling to the firm's offices in Asia. Currently, he serves as Managing Director and general counsel for KraneShares based in New York.

== Speeches, publications, and media appearances ==
Adelman is a prominent author and speaker on US and Asia trade relations. He is represented by Sage Worldwide.

In 2015, Adelman authored "Getting the Asia Trade Message Right", an article in The Wall Street Journal advocating for the Trans-Pacific Partnership (TPP). Adelman discussed his opinion of text of the TPP in a November 2015 The Washington Post article. He co-authored an editorial arguing the TPP improves US security which was published in Politico in 2015. He was quoted in The Washington Post in 2016 regarding the prospects for approval of the Transpacific Partnership agreement in the lame duck session of Congress.

Adelman was interviewed by the International Business Times and the South China Morning Post shortly after the 2016 United States presidential election regarding the potential impact of the election of Donald Trump and again in December 2016 regarding Secretary of State nominee Rex Tillerson.

In 2017 he commented to The Wall Street Journal regarding the collision of the US Navy Destroyer the USS John S. McCain with a merchant vessel in the Straits of Malacca. Adelman provided comments regarding the U.S. - North Korea summit meeting on television programs including MSNBC's Morning Joe First Look, MSNBC Live and CNBC's Squawk Box as well as the Washington Post. Adelman has also written on the intersection of foreign investments and the nationalization of Indonesian oil. In an editorial he authored in Forbes in 2010 he advocated for streamlined travel access to Southeast Asian countries for American business travelers as a means to increase U.S. exports in emerging markets. Adelman argued for full funding of the US Navy Littoral Combat Ship program in an editorial published in Politico in 2016. In 2016 he authored an editorial published in The Huffington Post stating the next US president must exercise discipline and restraint to promote US–China cooperation and stability in the Pacific.

In April 2018 Adelman shared his concerns with increasing trade related tensions between the U.S. and China in an interview with the South China Morning Post. He also appeared on CNBC in a wide-ranging interview that included discussions of US options in Syria.

In May 2019, Adelman authored an editorial in the South China Morning Post urging the U.S. to listen more closely to its friends in Asia and re-engage in multilateral organizations.

Adelman is a frequent television commentator on business issues in the Asia-Pacific region. In 2013 he appeared on Bloomberg to discuss American investment in South East Asia. In 2015 he appeared on CNN to discuss diplomatic relations between China and Taiwan. Adelman analyzed the 2016 ASEAN summit in the US in his interview on CNN in February 2016. He was interviewed regarding the 2016 State of the Union address by CNBC in January 2016. Also in 2016 he appeared on CNBC program Street Signs discussing the impact of commodity prices on Asian economies and US politics. Adelman appeared on CNBC Squawk Box to discuss political risk to business in Asia during the 2016 US presidential campaign and to discuss US trade policies in 2018. He was on the program in January 2017 to discuss the first two days of the Trump Administration and in March 2017 to discuss Rex Tillerson's first trip to Asia as US Secretary of State. In August 2017 he appeared on Channel News Asia to discuss the USS John S. McCain collision. In 2018 he appeared on Channel News Asia to discuss the TPP11 trade pact. Adelman has appeared on MSNBC, NBC, BBC, and Chinese and Indonesian television. He was interviewed during his time as US Ambassador by the Center for Strategic and International Studies. Adelman appeared on CNBC in October 2017 to discuss the Chinese Communist Party 19th Party Congress. He was featured twice on CNBC discussing President Trump's November 2017 visit to Asia.

Adelman was featured multiple times on CNBC in 2018 discussing US trade policy and security issues. In January 2019 appearances on CNBC and the BBC he argued both the US and China are losers in the trade war. Adelman appeared on CNBC Asia Street Signs in June 2019 commenting that globalization would increase despite US-China trade tensions. In May 2019 Adelman was quoted in the South China Morning Post discussing US export control policies. In July and August 2019 he was featured on CNN's First Move from the floor of the New York Stock Exchange discussing the impact of the trade war on the public equity markets. In October Adelman spoke to the South China Morning Post about President Trump's comment that China should investigate the son of former US Vice President Joseph Biden. In August 2021, Adelman commented on CNBC that the competition between the US and China is very different from the Cold War. He characterized the US–China dynamic as "two powerful countries competing within the same international system" as compared to the Cold War which he said was "a competition between two systems" which operated separately from each other. Speaking at the World Economic Forum in 2024, Adelman stated that the US and European political cycles combined with hangover anxieties from the global pandemic had led to "protectionist and isolationist sentiments.".

Adelman was quoted extensively in the Financial Times in December 2024 offering his outlook on Donald Trump's view of China in a second term.

== Personal life ==
In 1993, Adelman proposed to his now-wife, Caroline, in the Rose Garden of the White House. They have three adult children: Oscar, Leah, and Avery.
