= Patricia L. Herbold =

American diplomat (born 1940)

Patricia Louise Herbold
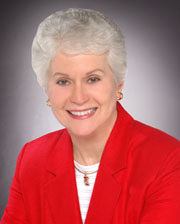

14th United States Ambassador to the Republic of Singapore
- In office November 7, 2005 – January 20, 2009
- President: George W. Bush
- Preceded by: Frank Lavin
- Succeeded by: David I. Adelman

Personal details
- Born: September 24, 1940 (age 85) Cincinnati, Ohio, U.S.
- Party: Republican

Patricia Louise Herbold (born 1940) is a chemist, former city mayor, and the former United States Ambassador to the Republic of Singapore.

== Early life ==
Herbold was born in and grew up in Cincinnati, Ohio. Born into a family of five children, Herbold's father left the family due to a gambling addiction and her mother raised the five children by herself. Unable to raise the five children, Herbold and her four siblings were left at St. Joseph’s Orphanage in Ohio. Herbold would stayed at the orphanage from fifth grade until after eighth grade.

She received a B.A. in chemistry from Edgecliff College (now part of Xavier University) in Cincinnati in 1962, graduating cum laude. She later received a J.D. degree from the Northern Kentucky University Salmon P. Chase College of Law in 1977, graduating second in her class.

== Career ==
=== Chemistry ===
Herbold initially worked for the federal government as an analytical chemist dealing with water pollution. She later served as Chief of the Data Processing Unit of the Federal Water Pollution Control Administration Lake Erie Program Office.

=== Law ===
After retiring from the federal government, Herbold began a career as an attorney. She was a prosecutor and had a private practice from 1978 to 1979. Later, she was Associate Regional Counsel for Prudential Insurance of America from 1979 to 1988. For two years from 1988 to 1990, she was the General Counsel of Bank One, Dayton, Ohio. She was an attorney with the Cincinnati law firm of Taft, Stettinius & Hollister from 1990 to 1994.

=== Local government ===
Herbold was a member of the City Council of Montgomery, Ohio from 1983 to 1986. She was mayor of the city beginning in 1986.

She moved to Washington state in 1995 when her husband, Robert Herbold became Executive Vice President and Chief Operating Officer of Microsoft Corporation in 1994, where he worked until 2003.

Herbold was appointed to be a Commissioner on the Washington State Gambling Commission from 1997 to 2000.

She was elected Chairman of the King County Republican Party in December 2002 and served one term before being appointed Ambassador.

=== Diplomatic career ===
In 2005, Herbold was appointed Ambassador of the United States of America to the Republic of Singapore. Soon after her appointment, she presented her credentials to President S. R. Nathan in a ceremony at Istana.

On May 18, 2006, she commemorated the return of the Revere Bell to the National Museum of Singapore. She regularly did volunteer work with children in Singapore.

In 2009, Herbold vacated the position after Barack Obama was appointed as the President of the United States. She was succeeded by David I. Adelman.

== Charitable efforts ==
Prior to being accredited to Singapore, Herbold was a member of the President's 21st Century Workforce Council, on the Board of St. Joseph Orphanage of Cincinnati, the Seattle Art Museum, and the Performing Arts Center Eastside in Bellevue, Washington.

Herbold and her husband have supported cancer research. They gave a US$1.5 million gift to the Fred Hutchinson Cancer Center to establish the Herbold Computational Biology Program.

=== Environmental conservation ===
Herbold has worked with Long Live the Kings, a non-profit organization dedicated to the restoration of wild salmon in the Pacific Northwest.

== Awards ==
Herbold was the first recipient of the annual Scholar of Life Award of St. Joseph Orphanage and was inducted into the Horatio Alger Association of Distinguished Americans in April, 2014.

== Personal life ==
Herbold met and married her husband, Robert J. Herbold, who was her trigonometry instructor. Together they have three children and seven grandchildren.

Diplomatic posts
Preceded by Frank Lavin	United States Ambassador to Singapore; 2005–2009	Succeeded by David Adelman
