= Richard H. Donald =

American diplomat

Richard Hempstead Donald (November 3, 1922, in Johannesburg, South Africa – March 12, 1984) was an American diplomat. He was the son of George Kenneth Donald, U.S. Consul General at Windsor, Ontario, and married Jean Randolph Plass in 1944. He graduated from Yale University in 1943 and served in the U.S. Army from 1943 to 1946.

He served as acting Consul General to the Republic of Singapore from the summer of 1965, when the embassy opened, until April 1966. He was named chargé d'affaires on April 4, 1966, serving in that position until September 1966.
