= 1942 South Dakota Senate election =

- November 3, 1942

35 seats in the South Dakota Senate 18 seats needed for a majority
	Majority party	Minority party
Leader	D. J. Tiede	—
Party	Republican	Democratic
Leader since	1941
Leader's seat	4th (Douglas–Hutchinson)
Last election	31	4
Seats won	31	4
Seat change	Steady	Steady
- Results by winning party Republican hold Democratic hold Multi-member districts: Republican majority Democratic majority
President pro tempore before election
D. J. Tiede
Republican
Elected President pro tempore
D. J. Tiede
Republican

Elections to the South Dakota Senate were held on November 3, 1942, to elect 35 candidates to the Senate to serve a two-year term in the 28th South Dakota Legislature. Republicans won thirty-one seats, retaining their supermajority status in the chamber. Democrats won four seats. Republican Senator D. J. Tiede of Parkston (District 4, Douglas–Hutchinson) was re-elected President pro tempore of the Senate.

This election took place alongside races for U.S. Senate, U.S. House, governor, state house, and numerous other state and local elections.

== See also ==
- List of South Dakota state legislatures
