= 1942 South Dakota gubernatorial election =

- November 3, 1942
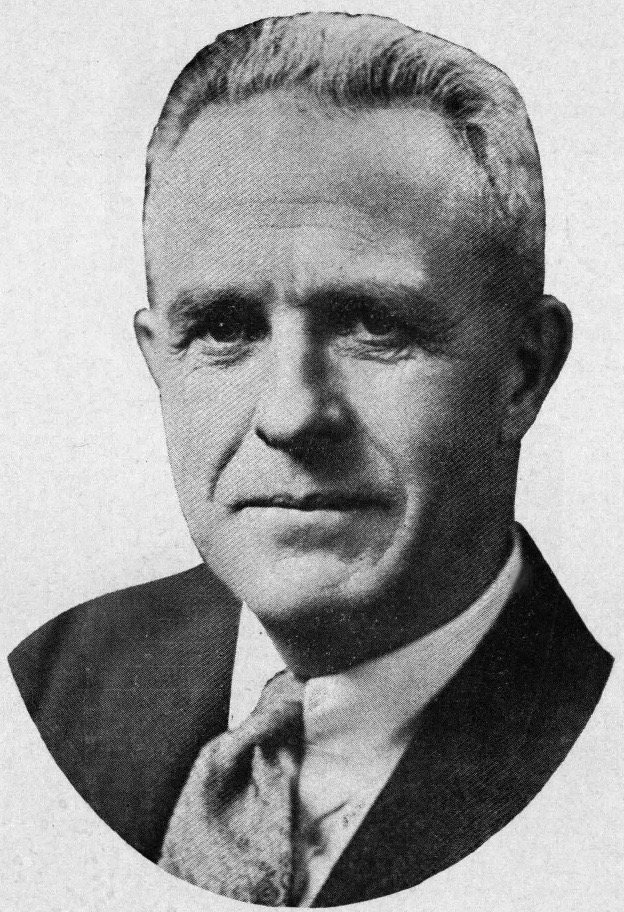

Nominee	Merrell Q. Sharpe	Lewis W. Bicknell
Party	Republican	Democratic
Popular vote	109,786	68,706
Percentage	61.51%	38.49%
- County results Sharpe: 50–60% 60–70% 70–80% 80–90% Bicknell: 50–60% 60–70%
Governor of South Dakota before election
Harlan J. Bushfield
Republican
Elected Governor of South Dakota
Merrell Q. Sharpe
Republican

The 1942 South Dakota gubernatorial election was held on November 3, 1942. Incumbent Republican Governor Harlan J. Bushfield declined to seek re-election to a third term and instead successfully ran for the U.S. Senate. A crowded Republican primary developed to succeed him, and because no candidate received 35% of the vote, the nomination was decided at the state Republican convention, where former Attorney General Merrell Q. Sharpe, the second-place finisher in the primary, won the nomination. In the general election, Sharpe faced Democratic nominee Lewis W. Bicknell, the 1940 Democratic nominee for governor. Aided by the national Republican landslide, Sharpe defeated Bicknell in a landslide.

== Democratic primary ==
Lewis W. Bicknell—a former Day County State's Attorney, former chairman of the State Department of Public Welfare, and the 1940 Democratic nominee for governor—announced that he would again run for governor. He was the only Democratic candidate to file and he won the Democratic nomination for governor unopposed, thereby removing the race from the primary ballot.

== Republican primary ==
=== Candidates ===
- Joseph H. Bottum, State Director of Taxation, former Faulk County State's Attorney
- Merrell Q. Sharpe, former Attorney General of South Dakota
- Leo A. Temmey, Attorney General of South Dakota
- Millard G. Scott, State Rural Credit Director

=== Campaign ===
At the May 5, 1942, primary, all four candidates ended up with vote totals that were within six thousand votes of each other, and for the first time since 1930, no candidate received the requisite 35% of the vote. Merrell Q. Sharpe, who ran on a reform, "oust the state house" platform, was seen by many observers as having a lead coming into the convention, despite placing second in the primary. There was speculation that Sharpe's three other opponents would consolidate their forces to defeat him at the convention, but uncertainty as to whether they would do so. Influential state Republicans, chief among them Governor Bushfield, declined to publicly intervene. At the convention, Sharpe took an early lead, and despite the speculation about anti-Sharpe consolidation, as Temmey and Scott collapsed, the vast majority of their votes went to Sharpe, not Bottom. On the third ballot, with Temmey's support halved and Scott's near zero, Sharpe easily won a majority, earning himself the nomination.

=== Primary election results ===
Republican primary
Party	Candidate	Votes	%
Republican	Joseph H. Bottum	23,714	28.85%
Republican	Merrell Q. Sharpe	21,208	25.68%
Republican	Leo A. Temmey	20,107	24.46%
Republican	Millard G. Scott	17,272	21.01%
Total votes		82,201	100.00%

=== Convention results ===
Gubernatorial ballot
	1st	2nd	3rd
Merrell Q. Sharpe	66,598	74,369	100,023
Joseph H. Bottum	43,066	49,537	47,218
Leo A. Temmey	35,162	28,171	18,342
Millard G. Scott	21,134	14,902	1,396

== General election ==
=== Results ===
1942 South Dakota gubernatorial election
Party	Candidate	Votes	%	±%
Republican	Merrell Q. Sharpe	109,786	61.51%	+6.37%
Democratic	Lewis W. Bicknell	68,706	38.49%	−6.37%
Majority		41,080	23.02%	+12.74%
Turnout		178,492	100.00%	
Republican hold				
