= 1938 South Dakota Senate election =

- November 8, 1938

35 seats in the South Dakota Senate 18 seats needed for a majority
	Majority party	Minority party
Leader	L. M. Simons (retired as leader)	—
Party	Republican	Democratic
Leader since	1937
Leader's seat	31st (Butte–Harding)
Last election	23	22
Seats won	30	5
Seat change	▲7	▼17
Popular vote	99,730 (Note: Vote totals from multi-county districts only)	78,639
- Republican hold Republican gain Democratic hold Democratic gain Multi-member districts: Republican majority Democratic majority Republican: 50–60% 60–70% Democratic: 50–60% Republican: 50–60% 60–70% 70–80% 80–90% Democratic: 50–60% Tie: 50%
President pro tempore before election
L. M. Simons
Republican
Elected President pro tempore
A. W. Odell
Republican

Elections to the South Dakota Senate were held on November 8, 1938, to elect 35 candidates to the Senate to serve a two-year term in the 26th South Dakota Legislature. This was the first general election to take place under the new apportionment plan passed by the legislature in 1937, which reduced the number of districts from forty-two to thirty-three, and reduced the number of senators from forty-five to thirty-five. Republicans won thirty seats, an increase of seven from the twenty-three they won at the 1934 general election, but the Democrats only won five, a loss of seventeen from 1934, giving the Republicans a supermajority in the chamber. Republican Senator A. W. Odell of Montrose was elected President pro tempore of the Senate.

This election took place alongside races for U.S. Senate, U.S. House, governor, state house, and numerous other state and local elections.

== See also ==
- List of South Dakota state legislatures
