= 1928 South Dakota Senate election =

- November 6, 1928

45 seats in the South Dakota Senate 23 seats needed for a majority
	Majority party	Minority party
Leader	C. S. Amsden (retired)	—
Party	Republican	Democratic
Leader since	1915	—
Leader's seat	31st (Grant Co.)	—
Last election	30	15
Seats after	33	12
Seat change	▲3	▼3
- Results by party Republican gain Republican hold Democratic gain Democratic hold Multi-member districts: Republican majority
President pro tempore before election
C. S. Amsden
Republican
Elected President pro tempore
L. M. Simons
Republican

Elections to the South Dakota Senate were held on November 2, 1928, to elect 45 candidates to the Senate to serve a two-year term in the 21st South Dakota Legislature. Republicans won thirty-three seats, up from thirty at the 1926 general election, retaining their majority in the chamber. L. M. Simons of Belle Fourche was elected President pro tempore of the Senate.

This election took place alongside races for U.S. President, U.S. House, governor, state house, and numerous other state and local elections.

== See also ==
- List of South Dakota state legislatures
