= 1944 South Dakota Senate election =

- November 7, 1944

35 seats in the South Dakota Senate 18 seats needed for a majority
	Majority party	Minority party
Leader	David J. Tiede	—
Party	Republican	Democratic
Leader since	1941
Leader's seat	4th (Douglas–Hutchinson)
Last election	31	4
Seats won	35	0
Seat change	▲4	▼4
- Results by winning party Republican hold Republican gain Multi-member districts: Republican majority
President pro tempore before election
D. J. Tiede
Republican
Elected President pro tempore
Charles S. Reed
Republican

Elections to the South Dakota Senate were held on November 7, 1944, to elect 35 candidates to the Senate to serve a two-year term in the 29th South Dakota Legislature. The 28th Legislature's four Democratic senators were completely wiped out of the chamber, with Republicans taking all thirty-five seats. Republican Senator Charles S. Reed of Rapid City (District 28, Pennington County) was elected President pro tempore of the Senate.

This election took place alongside races for U.S. presidential electors, U.S. Senate, U.S. House, governor, state house, and numerous other state and local elections.

== See also ==
- List of South Dakota state legislatures
