= 1940 South Dakota Senate election =

- November 5, 1940

35 seats in the South Dakota Senate 18 seats needed for a majority
	Majority party	Minority party
Leader	A. W. Odell	Carl Weir
Party	Republican	Democratic
Leader since	1939	1939
Leader's seat	8th (McCook–Hanson)	15th (Beadle Co.)
Last election	30	5
Seats won	31	4
Seat change	▲1	▼1
Popular vote	85,784 (Note: Vote totals from multi-county districts only)	55,130
- Republican hold Republican gain Democratic hold Democratic gain Multi-member districts: Republican majority Democratic majority Republican: 50–60% 60–70% Unopposed Republican: 50–60% 60–70% 70–80% Unopposed; Democratic: 50–60% 60–70% No votes
President pro tempore before election
A. W. Odell
Republican
Elected President pro tempore
D. J. Tiede
Republican

Elections to the South Dakota Senate were held on November 5, 1940, to elect 35 candidates to the Senate to serve a two-year term in the 27th South Dakota Legislature. Republicans won thirty-one seats, a gain of one from the thirty they won at the 1938 general election, retaining their supermajority status in the chamber. Democrats won four seats, a loss of one from 1938. Republican Senator D. J. Tiede of Parkston (District 4, Douglas–Hutchinson) was elected President pro tempore of the Senate.

This election took place alongside races for U.S. presidential electors, U.S. House, governor, state house, and numerous other state and local elections.

== See also ==
- List of South Dakota state legislatures
