= Albert C. Miller =

American politician and lawyer (1898–1979)

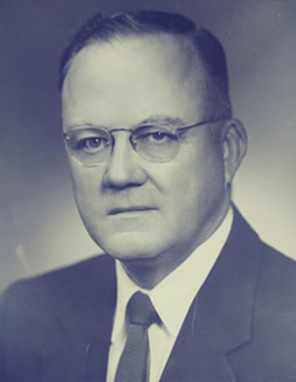
AC Miller as the 21st Attorney General of South Dakota

Albert C. "AC" Miller (born September 30, 1898 – October 22, 1979) was an American attorney and the 21st Attorney General of South Dakota between 1961 and 1963 and the Lieutenant Governor of South Dakota from 1941 and 1945.

== Career ==
AC Miller resided in Kennebec in Lyman County. After earning a law degree from the University of South Dakota School of Law and gaining admission to the bar, he established his legal practice there. Concurrently, he embarked on a political career as a member of the Republican Party. Between 1933 and 1940, he sat as a deputy in the House of Representatives of South Dakota, and its chamber's speaker in 1937.

=== Lieutenant governor ===
In 1940, Miller was elected as Lieutenant Governor of South Dakota alongside Harlan J. Bushfield. He held this office from 1941 and 1945, after being reelected. During his tenure, he served as Deputy Governor and Chairman of the State Senate. In 1943, he began serving under the new governor, Merrell Q. Sharpe . In 1944, he ran unsuccessfully in his party's primaries for a seat in the US Senate.

=== 1960 Attorney General Election ===
From 1961 to 1963, he held the office of Attorney General of his state. On August 1, 1960, Miller was nominated at the Republican Convention in Pierre, after 1958 Republican Attorney General nominee George Wuest of Mitchell decided not to run.

Miller defeated incumbent Democrat Attorney General Parnell Donahue with 160,299 votes while Donahue received 138,320 votes.

He died on October 22, 1979.

Party political offices
Preceded by George Wuest	Republican nominee for Attorney General of South Dakota; 1960	Succeeded by Frank Farrar
Political offices
Preceded by Donald McMurchie	Lieutenant Governor of South Dakota; 1941-1945	Succeeded by Sioux K. Grigsby
Legal offices
Preceded by Parnell J. Donahue	Attorney General of South Dakota; 1961-1963	Succeeded by Frank Farrar
