= Byron S. Payne =

American attorney and politician

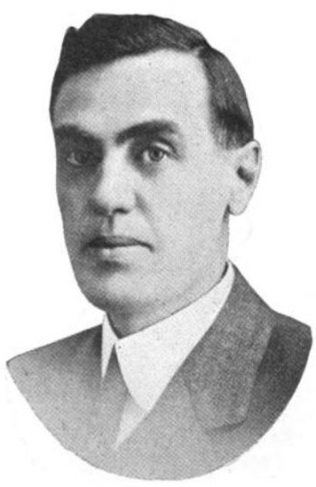
- From 1921's South Dakota Legislative Manual

10th Attorney General of South Dakota
- In office January 1919 – January 1923
- Governor: Peter Norbeck; William H. McMaster
- Preceded by: Clarence C. Caldwell
- Succeeded by: Buell F. Jones

State's Attorney of Hughes County, South Dakota
- In office January 1941 – January 1945
- Preceded by: Otto B. Linstad
- Succeeded by: Robert C. Riter

Personal details
- Born: February 2, 1876 Vermillion, South Dakota
- Died: May 30, 1949 (aged 73) Pierre, South Dakota
- Resting place: Riverside Cemetery, Pierre, South Dakota
- Party: Republican
- Spouse: Jessie Blanche Mallery (m. 1910–1949, his death)
- Children: 2
- Education: University of South Dakota; University of Minnesota Law School
- Occupation: Attorney; Insurance company president

Byron S. Payne (February 2, 1876 – May 30, 1949) was an American attorney and politician from South Dakota. A Republican, he was best known for his service as the state's attorney general from 1919 to 1923.

== Early life ==
Byron Samuel Payne was born in Vermillion, Dakota Territory on February 2, 1876, a son of Byron Spencer Payne and Charlotte Elizabeth (Woodworth) Payne. He was educated in the schools of Clay County and received his Bachelor of Science degree from the University of South Dakota in 1897. Payne worked as a school teacher and principal until deciding on a career as an attorney.

== Start of career ==
In 1902, Payne began attendance at the University of Minnesota Law School, from which he graduated with a LL.B. in 1904.

After Payne was admitted to the bar, he began to practice law in Watertown. In 1906, he entered into a partnership with his brother Jason, which maintained offices in Vermillion and Pierre. Payne managed the Pierre office, and his partners there included Zell Guthrie and John Sutherland. The partnership was later reorganized, and Payne continued to practice in Pierre as one of the principals in the Sutherland & Payne firm.

In addition to practicing law, Payne also became involved in politics as a Republican. In late 1906 and early 1907, he was one of the organizers for events held to celebrate the inauguration of Coe I. Crawford as governor. Payne was also active in business ventures outside his law practice. In 1907, he was an original incorporator of the Western Union Accident Insurance Company.

In 1908, Payne was a candidate for State's Attorney of Hughes County. He lost the Republican nomination to Glenn W. Martens, who went on to win the general election. In late 1908 and early 1909, he was an organizer of the inaugural celebration for Governor Robert S. Vessey. In March 1909, Payne was one of several Republicans who made up South Dakota's delegation to the inauguration of President William Howard Taft.

Payne was appointed Pierre's City Attorney in 1910, and he served until 1914. In 1912, Payne supported the Progressive Party candidacy of former President Theodore Roosevelt, who ran as a third-party candidate after losing the Republican nomination to Taft. The split between Taft and Roosevelt enabled the election of Democratic nominee Woodrow Wilson. Despite supporting Roosevelt, Payne remained in the Republican fold. In 1913, Payne was elected to the state Republican committee as a representative of the majority (progressive) wing of the party. In 1914, he was an unsuccessful candidate for the Republican nomination for a seat in the South Dakota Senate. Payne also carried out an appointment as a special assistant state attorney general in 1914. In addition, in 1914 he was one of the original incorporators of a speculative venture, the Mexican Oil Transportation Company.

In 1915, Payne was appointed first assistant state attorney general, and he served until January 1919. In 1916, Payne was an incorporator of another Mexican oil venture, the Queen Oil Company. In 1917, he was appointed to the board of directors of the Bellefourche & Northwestern Railroad.

== Attorney General ==
In 1918, Payne was a candidate for the Republican nomination for Attorney General of South Dakota. He won the May primary, defeating Harlan J. Bushfield, Howard G. Fuller, and two other candidates. He easily won the November general election, defeating Democrat Joseph J. Conry and independent candidate Seth Teasdale.

Payne was a candidate for reelection in 1920. He was unopposed for the Republican nomination, and defeated Democrat Peter Ward and independent O. M. Burch in the general election. He was not a candidate for reelection in 1922, and served from January 1919 to January 1923. Payne was succeeded by Buell F. Jones.

== Later life ==
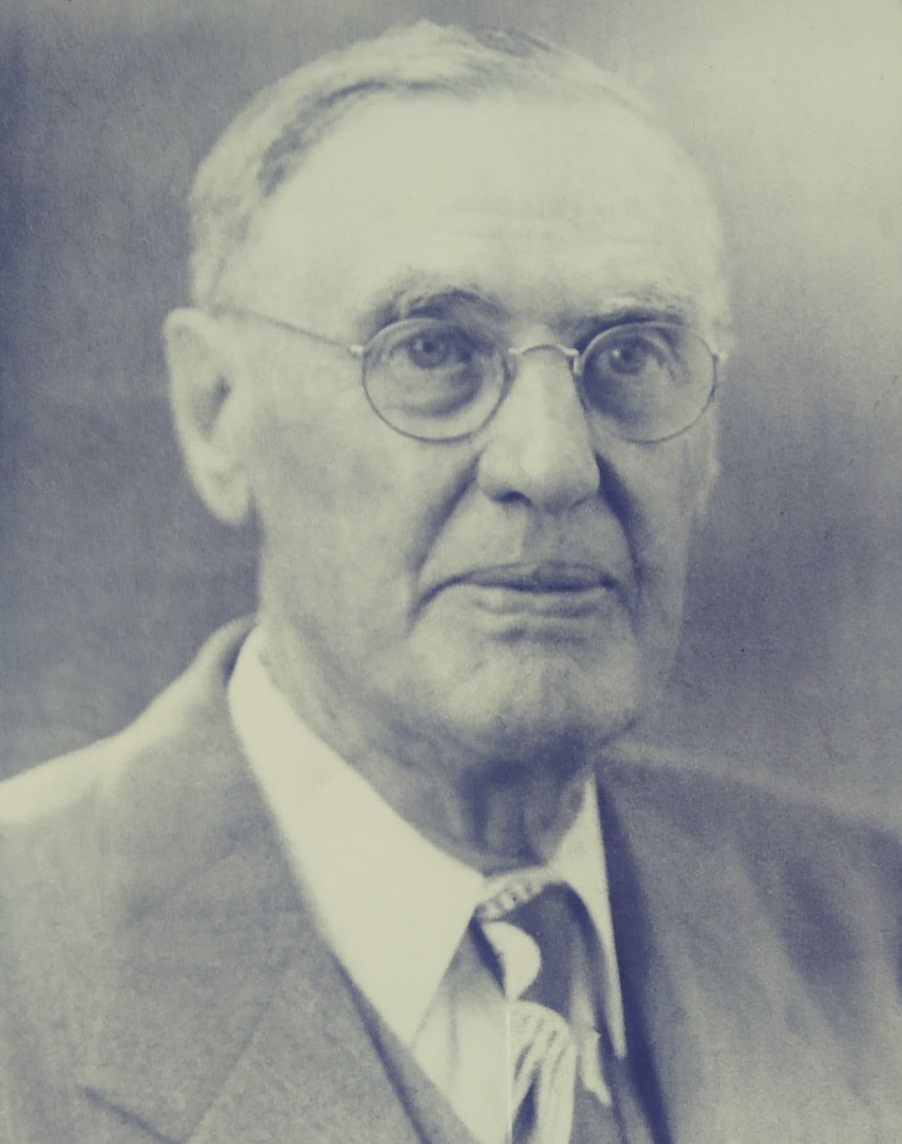
Payne in his later years

After leaving office, Payne resumed his law practice and business interests, including serving as president of the First National Life Insurance Company. From 1927 to 1934 he served as an Assistant United States Attorney for the District of South Dakota.

In 1940, Payne won election as Hughes County State's Attorney. He was reelected in 1942. He did not run for another term in 1944, and served from January 1941 to January 1945.

== Death and burial ==
Payne died in Pierre on May 30, 1949. He was buried at Riverside Cemetery in Pierre.

== Family ==
In August 1910, Payne married Jessie Blanche Mallery of Pierre. They were the parents of two daughters, Elizabeth and Janet.

Party political offices
Preceded by Clarence C. Caldwell	Republican nominee for Attorney General of South Dakota; 1918, 1920	Succeeded by Buell F. Jones
