= Merrell Q. Sharpe =

American politician

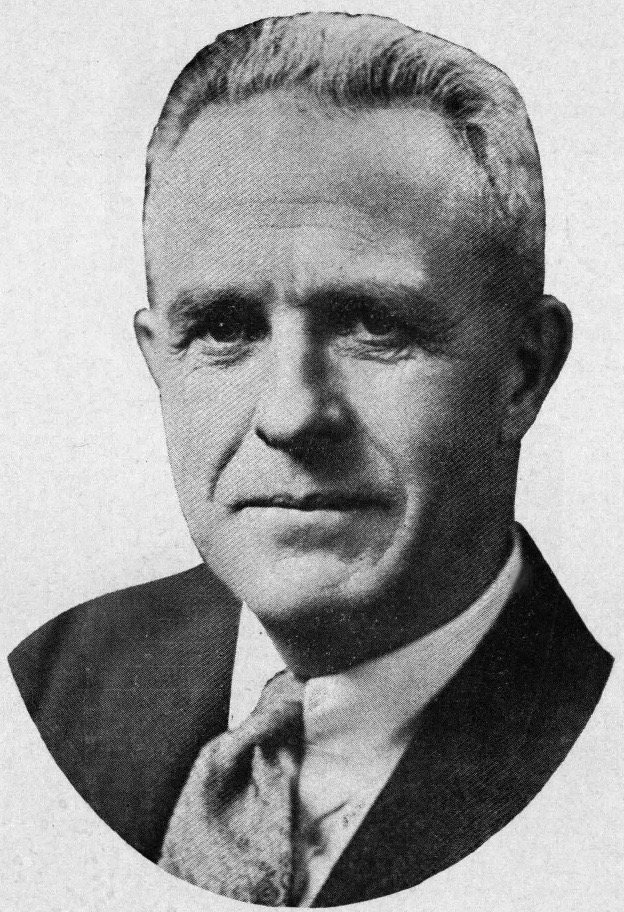

17th Governor of South Dakota
- In office January 5, 1943 – January 7, 1947
- Lieutenant: Albert C. Miller; Sioux K. Grigsby
- Preceded by: Harlan J. Bushfield
- Succeeded by: George T. Mickelson

12th Attorney General of South Dakota
- In office 1929–1933
- Governor: William J. Bulow; Warren Green
- Preceded by: Buell F. Jones
- Succeeded by: D. Walter Conway

Personal details
- Born: January 11, 1888 Marysville, Kansas
- Died: January 22, 1962 (aged 74) Kennebec, South Dakota
- Party: Republican
- Spouse: Emily Auld
- Children: 1
- Education: University of South Dakota School of Law
- Profession: Attorney

Merrell Quentin Sharpe (January 11, 1888 – January 22, 1962) was an American politician from Kennebec, South Dakota. Affiliated with the Republican Party, Sharpe was the attorney general of South Dakota from 1929 through 1933, and governor of South Dakota from 1943 through 1947.

== Biography ==
Sharpe was born in Marysville, Kansas (in Marshall County), on January 11, 1888. Educated in the public schools of Axtel, Kansas, he taught in rural schools two years before enlisting in the United States Navy, where he served for four years. He married Emily Auld and they had one child, Lorna Mae Sharpe.

== Career ==
Sharpe worked as a newspaper reporter while he studied at a Kansas City law school. He moved to South Dakota and earned an LL.B. from the University of South Dakota School of Law in 1914. He had a private law practice in Oacoma, South Dakota, where he also farmed. Sharpe was the Lyman County State's Attorney from 1916 to 1920. During World War I he served as a corporal assigned to Camp Dodge in Iowa, and later as an officer candidate at Camp Grant (Illinois).

Sharpe served as state Attorney General from 1929 to 1933. From 1937 to 1939, he was chairman of the South Dakota code commission appointed to revise the state's statutes.

Elected in 1942, Sharpe served as 17th governor of South Dakota from 1943 to 1947. During his tenure, he devoted himself to the war effort, promoted education, encouraged tourism and conservation.

== Death ==
Sharpe died in Kennebec and is interred at Graceland Cemetery, Oacoma, Lyman County, South Dakota US.

Party political offices
Preceded by Buell F. Jones	Republican nominee for Attorney General of South Dakota; 1928, 1930, 1932	Succeeded by Roy A. Nord
Preceded by Harlan J. Bushfield	Republican nominee for Governor of South Dakota; 1942, 1944	Succeeded by George Theodore Mickelson
Legal offices
Preceded by Buell F. Jones	Attorney General of South Dakota; 1929–1933	Succeeded by Walter Conway
Political offices
Preceded by Harlan J. Bushfield	Governor of South Dakota; 1943–1947	Succeeded by George T. Mickelson
