= 1950 South Dakota gubernatorial election =

- November 7, 1950
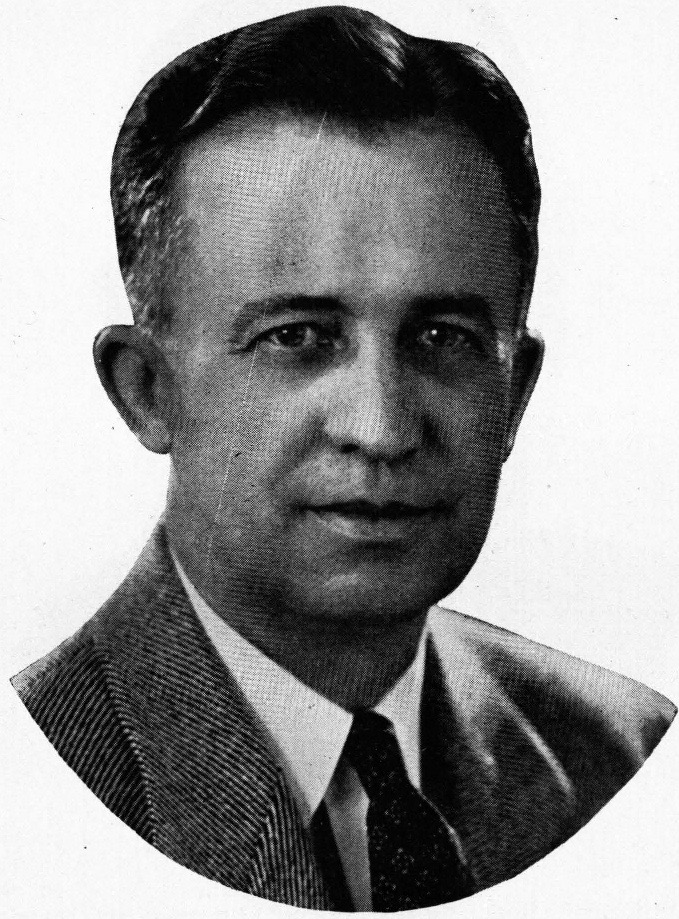

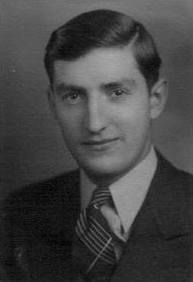
Nominee	Sigurd Anderson	Joe Robbie
Party	Republican	Democratic
Popular vote	154,254	99,062
Percentage	60.89%	39.11%
- County results Anderson: 50–60% 60–70% 70–80% 80–90% Robbie: 50–60% 60–70% 80–90% Tie: 50%
Governor before election
George T. Mickelson
Republican
Elected Governor
Sigurd Anderson
Republican

The 1950 South Dakota gubernatorial election was held on November 7, 1950. Incumbent Republican Governor George T. Mickelson was unable to seek re-election to a third term due to newly imposed term limits. Accordingly, a competitive race to replace him ensued. Attorney General Sigurd Anderson won a slim plurality in the Republican primary, barely exceeding 35% and narrowly avoiding having the Republican nomination sent to the state party convention. In the general election, Anderson faced State Representative Joe Robbie. Anderson easily defeated Robbie, winning his first term with 61% of the vote to Robbie's 39%.

== Democratic primary ==
State Representative Joe Robbie, who represented Davison County in the State House, was the only Democrat to file for the gubernatorial race, winning the nomination by default and removing the race from the primary election ballot.

== Republican primary ==
=== Candidates ===
- Sigurd Anderson, Attorney General of South Dakota
- Joe Foss, World War II flying ace
- Boyd Leedom, attorney
- Charles J. Dalthorp, State Finance Director
- Irwin R. Erickson, former Assistant Attorney General of South Dakota

=== Results ===
Republican primary results
Party	Candidate	Votes	%
Republican	Sigurd Anderson	35,609	35.34%
Republican	Joe Foss	33,257	33.01%
Republican	Boyd Leedom	20,059	19.91%
Republican	Charles J. Dalthorp	8,345	8.28%
Republican	Irwin R. Erickson	3,481	3.46%
Total votes		100,751	100.00%

== General election ==
=== Results ===
1950 South Dakota gubernatorial election
Party	Candidate	Votes	%	±%
Republican	Sigurd Anderson	154,254	60.89%	−0.19%
Democratic	Joe Robbie	99,062	39.11%	+0.19%
Majority		55,192	21.78%	−0.38%
Turnout		253,316	100.00%	
Republican hold				

== Bibliography ==
- Gubernatorial Elections, 1787-1997. Washington, D.C.: Congressional Quarterly Inc. 1998. ISBN 1-56802-396-0.
