= Joe Robbie =

American attorney and politician

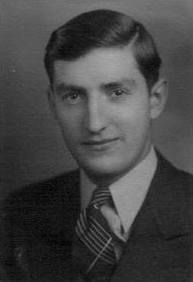

Personal details
- Born: July 7, 1916 Sisseton, South Dakota, U.S.
- Died: January 7, 1990 (aged 73) Coral Gables, Florida, U.S.
- Party: Democratic
- Spouse: Elizabeth Robbie (m. 1942)
- Children: 11
- Education: Northern State University (attended); University of South Dakota (BA, LLB)

Joseph Robbie (July 7, 1916 – January 7, 1990) was an American attorney, politician, and the co-founder of the Miami Dolphins.

== Early life ==
Robbie was raised in Sisseton, South Dakota, the second of five children. His father was a Lebanese immigrant and restaurant manager and his mother was a baker and the daughter of Irish immigrants. He was raised Catholic.

At 14 years old, Robbie was the sportswriter for his local newspaper, The People's Press. In 1934, during the Great Depression, Robbie dropped out of high school to work as a lumberjack for the Civilian Conservation Corps in the Black Hills, sending $25 of his $30 monthly earnings home to his family. After completing his high school education in 1936, Robbie enrolled at Northern State Teachers College on a debating scholarship. After three years, he transferred to the University of South Dakota. Robbie met his future wife, Elizabeth, while he was a senior at the school and she was a freshman. The couple were married two years later.

Robbie enlisted in the Navy on the day after the Japanese attack on Pearl Harbor. Robbie saw substantial action in the Pacific theater and was awarded a Bronze Star for his service. After his discharge, he used the G.I. Bill to return to University of South Dakota School of Law as a law student.

== Politics ==
Following his graduation from law school, Robbie worked as a deputy state's attorney and a professor of economics at Dakota Wesleyan University. In 1948, at 33 years old, Robbie entered politics. He was elected to the South Dakota House of Representatives as a Democrat. In 1950, he ran for Governor of South Dakota but lost to Sigurd Anderson. The following year, Robbie and his family moved to Minneapolis at the encouragement of then-mayor Hubert H. Humphrey.

His political and business careers further developed in Minnesota. In addition to operating his own law firm, Robbie served as regional counsel for the Office of Price Stabilization in Minnesota, Montana, North Dakota and South Dakota. He was also a charter member of the Twin Cities Metropolitan Commission and chairman of the Minnesota Municipal Commission. In addition to working on Humphrey's political campaigns, Robbie represented Minnesota's 5th congressional district at the 1960 Democratic National Convention.

Robbie also worked as a lobbyist for the tobacco industry from the 1960s until his death. In 1963, he appeared before the United States Senate to voice opposition to a bill which would have regulated tobacco advertising. From 1971 until 1989, he was the head of the Minnesota Candy & Tobacco Distributors Association.

Robbie was a member of the Non-Group, a politically influential group of Miami-Dade business elites.

== Professional sports ==
After moving to Minneapolis, Joe Robbie took an interest in professional football and became a season ticket holder for the Minnesota Vikings.

In March 1965, Robbie met with American Football League (AFL) Commissioner Joe Foss in Washington, D.C.. At the meeting, Foss recommended that Robbie look into Miami as a potential site for an expansion franchise. Robbie formed a partnership with comedian Danny Thomas, a fellow Lebanese-American, and raised the $7.5 million required to purchase an expansion team.

The Dolphins' stadium was officially called Joe Robbie Stadium from its opening in 1987 until 1996. It has undergone a series of name changes since, and it is currently known as Hard Rock Stadium.

In addition to his work in football, Robbie briefly appeared as himself in the 1977 thriller Black Sunday, where he was interviewed about security measures for Super Bowl X (1976), which was held at the Orange Bowl in Miami.

Robbie was also involved in professional soccer, owning both the Miami Toros, which rebranded in 1977 as the Fort Lauderdale Strikers. Both of teams that competed in the North American Soccer League (NASL). During the early 1980s, the Strikers were temporarily relocated to Minnesota and played as the Minnesota Strikers. The Strikers later returned to Florida and resumed operations in Fort Lauderdale, eventually competing in the American Professional Soccer League (APSL).

Joe Robbie Stadium was one of the first major sports venues in the United States designed with soccer in mind and was also engineered to be easily reconfigured for baseball.

Believing in Miami's growth as a major sports market, Robbie predicted the city would eventually secure a Major League Baseball franchise. His prediction was realized in 1990—just two months after his death—when Miami was awarded the Florida Marlins (now the Miami Marlins).

== Honors and awards ==
- For his contributions to the Miami Dolphins, and being the founder of the team, Joe Robbie became the inaugural inductee on the Miami Dolphins Honor Roll on September 16, 1990 (eight months after his death).
- For their efforts both Joe and Elizabeth Robbie were inducted as 'Builders' into the U.S. National Soccer Hall of Fame in 2003.

Party political offices
Preceded by Harold Volz	Democratic nominee for Governor of South Dakota; 1950	Succeeded by Sherman Iverson
Sporting positions
New creation	Principal Owner of the Miami Dolphins; 1966–1990	Succeeded by Wayne Huizenga
