= Attorney General Saunders =

Attorney General Saunders may refer to:

- John R. Saunders (1869–1934), Attorney General of Virginia
- Phil Saunders (1920–1997), Attorney General of South Dakota
- Romulus Mitchell Saunders (1791–1867), Attorney General of North Carolina
