= Clarence C. Caldwell =

American attorney

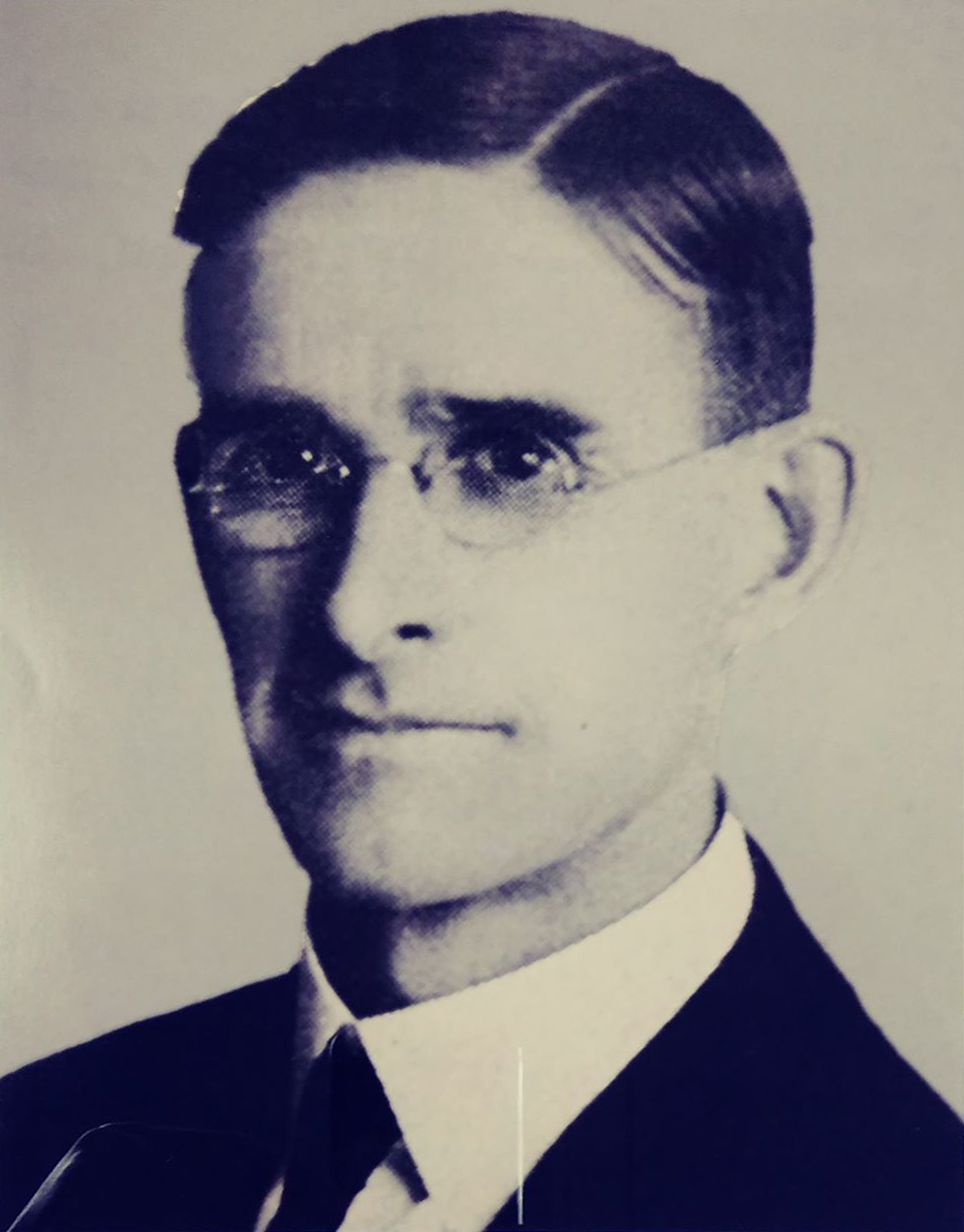

9th Attorney General of South Dakota
- In office 1915–1919
- Governor: Frank M. Byrne 1915-1917 Peter Norbeck 1917-1919
- Preceded by: Royal Johnson
- Succeeded by: Byron S. Payne

Personal details
- Born: February 7, 1877
- Died: October 4, 1957 (aged 80)
- Resting place: Woodlawn Cemetery, Sioux Falls, South Dakota
- Party: Republican
- Spouse: Marie Bryant
- Education: South Dakota State University; University of South Dakota School of Law
- Profession: Attorney

Clarence C. Caldwell (February 2, 1877 – October 4, 1957) was an American attorney and the 9th Attorney General of South Dakota.

== Early life and education ==
Clarence Carey Caldwell born in Minnehaha County, Dakota Territory on February 2, 1877. He was raised in Minnehaha County, and graduated from Sioux Falls High School. He attended South Dakota State University and graduated in 1902 with his BA. He received his LL.B. from the University of South Dakota School of Law in 1906 after initially attending the University of Chicago Law School. Caldwell was the principal of Vermillion High School for 3 years following is graduation from the University of South Dakota.

== Legal career ==
Caldwell was state's attorney of Miner County from 1907 to 1908 and 1911 to 1914. He was elected the 9th Attorney General of South Dakota in 1914. After leaving office he established a law practice in Sioux Falls in partnership with his brother Charles V. Caldwell. Caldwell later practiced in partnership with Roy D. Burns, who went on to serve as a judge of the circuit court.

== Death ==
Caldwell died on October 4, 1957. He was buried at Woodlawn Cemetery in Sioux Falls, South Dakota.

== Family ==
In 1908, Caldwell married Marie Bryant. They were the parents of a son and a daughter.

Party political offices
| Preceded by Royal C. Johnson | Republican nominee for Attorney General of South Dakota; 1914, 1916 | Succeeded by Byron S. Payne |
Legal offices
| Preceded by Royal C. Johnson | Attorney General of South Dakota; 1915–1919 | Succeeded by Byron S. Payne |
