= Larry Long (politician) =

American lawyer

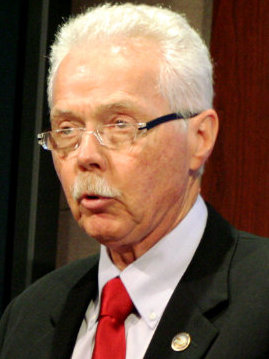
- Long in 2005

29th Attorney General of South Dakota
- In office 2003–2009
- Governor: Mike Rounds
- Preceded by: Mark Barnett
- Succeeded by: Marty Jackley

Personal details
- Born: September 30, 1947 (age 79) Brookings, South Dakota
- Party: Republican
- Spouse: Jan Long
- Children: 2
- Education: South Dakota State University (BS); University of South Dakota (JD)

Larry Long (born September 30, 1947) is an American judge and the former 29th Attorney General of the state of South Dakota, United States. A Republican, he was first elected Attorney General in 2002 and left office in 2009 to accept an appointment by Gov. Mike Rounds to a judgeship in the state's Second Judicial District.

== Early life and education ==
He graduated from South Dakota State University in 1969 and University of South Dakota School of Law in 1972.

== 2002 South Dakota Attorney General election ==
On April 12, 2002, Chief Deputy Attorney General Larry Long, declared he was running for Attorney General. Lawrence County States Attorney John H. Fitzgerald and Pennington County States Attorney Glenn Brenner also entered the race. Long would go on to win the Republican nomination at the Republican convention with 63.6% of the vote; Fitzgerald received 22.2% and Brenner received 14.2%. .

Beadle County States Attorney Mike Moore had declared he would run for the Democratic nomination, but agreed to step aside for state senator Ron J. Volesky who finished 2nd in the Democratic Gubernatorial race to James Abbott.

Larry won the general election by defeating Democrat Ron Volesky and Libertarian Bob Newland. Larry received 174,513 (53.52%)votes; Ron received 139,451 (42.76%) votes and Bob received 12,131 (3.72%) votes.

== 2006 South Dakota Attorney General election ==
Larry won reelection by defeating Democrat Ron Voelsky for the second time and Libertarian Randy Ristesund for the first time. Larry received 207,079 (64.66%) votes; Ron received 104,267 (32.56%) votes and Randy received 8,904 (2.78%) votes.

== Attorney General of South Dakota ==
Larry developed the 24/7 Sobriety program wherein Defendant would come in to do a PBT (Preliminary Breath Test) twice a day to prove they had not been using alcohol while out on bond. This program allowed the Defendant to continue to work and provide for his/her basic needs as well as his family, but hold him/her accountable while they awaited trial.

Larry also argued one case before the U.S. Supreme Court during his time as Attorney General of South Dakota. He resigned in 2009 to become a judge of the South Dakota Circuit Court.

=== Rhines v. Weber, 544 U.S. 269 (2005) ===
This case involved a habeas corpus challenge against the state (in the person of Warden Doug Weber) by Charles Russell Rhines, who was on death row at the time. The case involved the manner in which state and federal laws interact, for the purpose of allowing a federal court to stay a habeas case based on state law issues. Attorney General Larry Long argued for the state, but the court ruled unanimously for Rhines. Rhines was subsequently executed in 2019 by lethal injection.

== Awards and Accomplishments ==
While a judge, Long received the Justice Management Institute Award for Excellence.

== Personal ==
Long is married; he and his wife Jan have two children.

Party political offices
Preceded by Mark Barnett	Republican nominee for Attorney General of South Dakota; 2002, 2006	Succeeded by Marty Jackley
Legal offices
Preceded by Mark Barnett	29th Attorney General of South Dakota; 2003–2009	Succeeded by Marty Jackley
