= Phil Saunders =

American lawyer

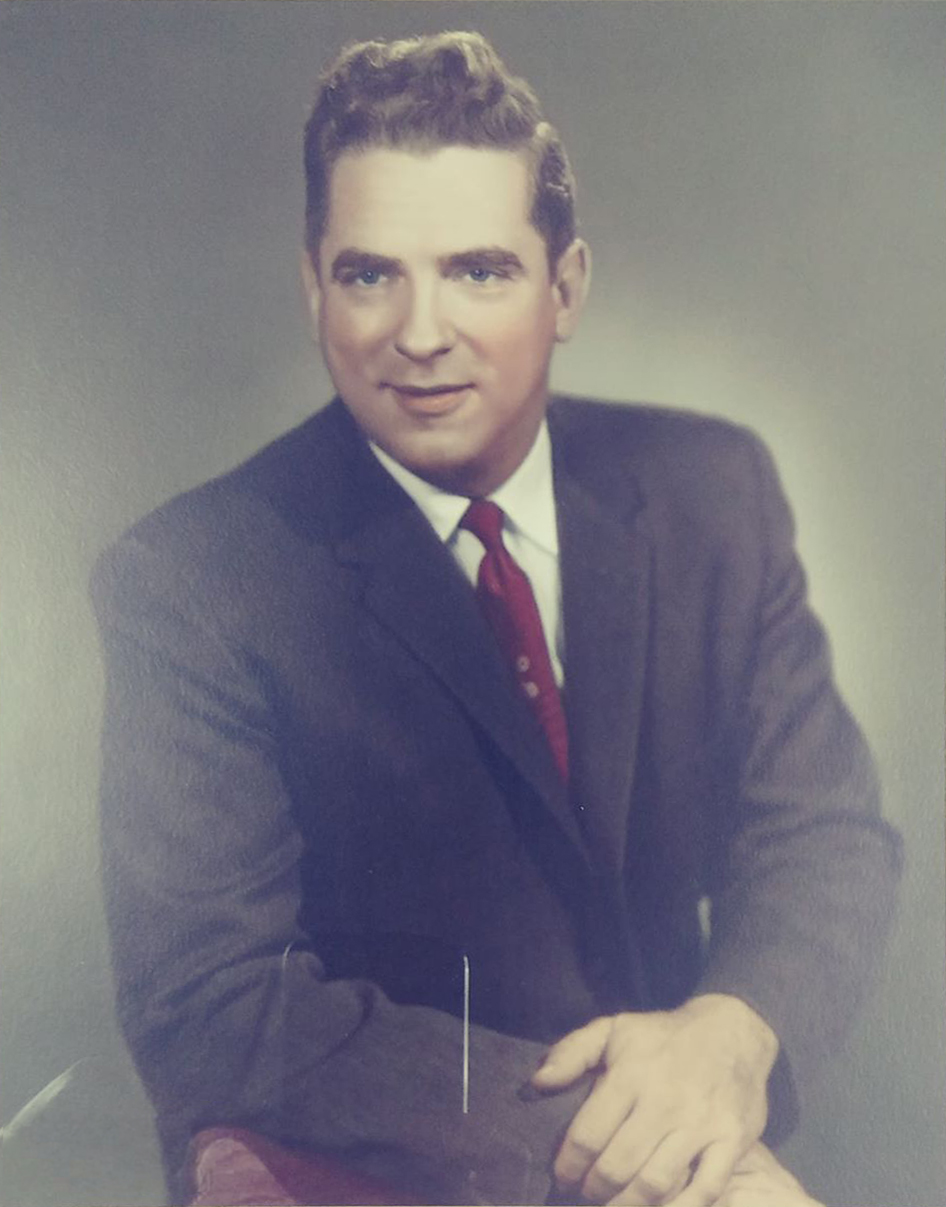

19th Attorney General of South Dakota
- In office 1955–1959
- Governor: Joe Foss
- Preceded by: Ralph A. Dunham
- Succeeded by: Parnell J. Donahue

Personal details
- Born: September 10, 1920 Milbank, South Dakota, U.S.
- Died: March 15, 1997 (aged 76)
- Party: Republican
- Education: Northwestern University School of Law
- Profession: Attorney

Phil Saunders (September 10, 1920 – March 15, 1997) was an American politician and soldier who fought in World War II, an American attorney and 19th Attorney General of South Dakota from 1955 to 1959. Born in Milbank, South Dakota, he was married to the niece of U.S. Senator Francis Case.

== Career ==
Saunders was a Republican. He graduated from the Northwestern University School of Law.

=== 1954 Attorney General election ===
On July 27, 1954, Saunders was nominated for attorney general at the state convention by acclamation; Governor Sigurd Anderson said he thought that was the first time the nomination for the office for a first term had been awarded without a contest. Saunders defeated his general election opponent, Democrat Fred Nichols.

=== 1956 Attorney General election ===
On July 16, 1956, Saunders was nominated by acclamation at the state convention in his re-election bid. In the general election, Saunders defeated Democrat William H. Heuermann by 156,149 votes to 127,988.

=== 1958 gubernatorial election ===
In 1958, Saunders ran for Governor of South Dakota. He defeated L. Roy Houck for the Republican nomination, but lost to Democrat Ralph Herseth in the general election.

Party political offices
Preceded by Ralph A. Dunham	Republican nominee for Attorney General of South Dakota; 1954, 1956	Succeeded by George Wuest
Preceded by Joe Foss	Republican nominee for Governor of South Dakota; 1958	Succeeded by Archie M. Gubbrud
Legal offices
Preceded by Ralph A. Dunham	Attorney General of South Dakota; 1955-1959	Succeeded by Parnell J. Donahue
