= Clair Roddewig =

American politician

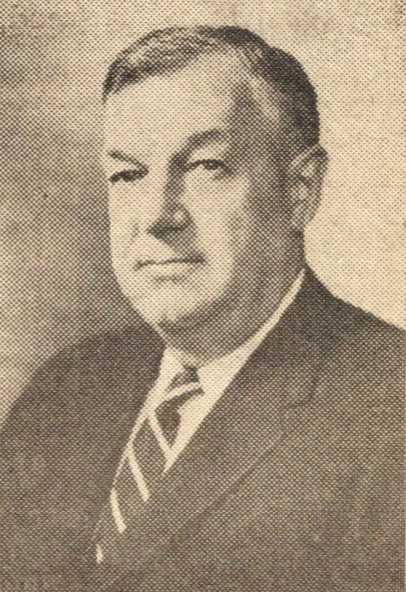
- The De Paulia (Chicago, IL), February 8, 1953

14th Attorney General of South Dakota
- In office 1937–1939
- Preceded by: D. Walter Conway
- Succeeded by: Leo A. Temmey

President of the Chicago Board of Education
- In office 1962–1964
- Preceded by: William G. Caples
- Succeeded by: Frank M. Whiston

Member of the Chicago Transit Authority Board
- In office 1970 – February 24, 1975
- Appointed by: Richard J. Daley (mayor of Chicago)
- Preceded by: Joseph D. Murphy
- Succeeded by: Edward F. Brabec

Personal details
- Born: April 18, 1903 Newcastle, Nebraska
- Died: February 24, 1975 (aged 71) Hinsdale, Illinois
- Party: Democratic
- Education: Creighton University School of Law (L.L.B.); John Marshall School of Law (J.D.)
- Occupation: Attorney

Clair M. Roddewig (April 18, 1903 – February 24, 1975) was an American attorney and the 14th Attorney General of South Dakota.

== Early life and education ==
Roddewig grew up in Newcastle, Nebraska.

He received his L.L.B. from the Creighton University School of Law. He later received a Juris Doctor from the John Marshall Law School in Chicago in 1947.

== Legal career ==
A native of Newcastle, Nebraska, after studying law at Creighton University in Omaha, Roddewig was admitted to the Nebraska bar in 1926. Moving from Omaha to South Dakota in 1931, he became the state's Assistant Attorney General in 1933 and served as Attorney General of South Dakota from 1937 to 1939 as a Democrat. In 1938, he was defeated for reelection by Republican nominee Leo A. Temmey, losing by a margin of 7.6 points.

Roddewig became a lawyer for the Interstate Commerce Commission in 1939 and was general counsel of the Office of Defense Transportation from 1942 to 1945.

== Later career in Chicago ==
Following World War II, Roddewig moved to Chicago, working as general counsel of the Chicago and Eastern Illinois Railroad. In 1947, he became vice president of the railroad. He became the railroad's president in 1949, serving in this role until 1957. From 1957 through 1970, he served as president of the Association of Western Railways.

Active in Chicago civics, Roddewig was considered an ally of Mayor Richard J. Daley. Roddewig served as president of the Chicago Board of Education from 1962 through 1964. He served as a mediator between the district and protest groups amid protests demanding the removal of Benjamin Willis from his position as Superintendent. In 1970, Daley appointed Roddewig to serve on the Chicago Transit Authority Board. He was serving on the transit board the time of his death.

While living in Chicago, Roddewig served on the Citizens Board of the University of Chicago and the advisory committee of the Illinois Board of Higher Education. He also served on the board of Catholic Charities of Chicago. He was a trustee of the John Marshall Law School (of which he was an alumni, receiving a J.D. degree in 1947), as well as a trustee of both of DePaul University (which gave him an honorary L.L. D. in 1963) and of St. Mary's College in Notre Dame, Indiana.

Roddenwig died on February 24, 1975, at the age of 72 while at the residence of one of his daughters in the Chicago suburb of Hinsdale, Illinois.

Legal offices
Preceded by D. Walter Conway	Attorney General of South Dakota; 1937–1939	Succeeded by Leo A. Temmey
