= Mark V. Meierhenry =

American politician (1944–2020)

26th Attorney General of South Dakota
- In office January 1, 1979 – January 6, 1987
- Governor: Bill Janklow
- Preceded by: Bill Janklow
- Succeeded by: Roger Tellinghuisen

Personal details
- Born: October 29, 1944; Gregory, South Dakota, U.S.
- Died: July 29, 2020 (aged 75); Sioux Falls, South Dakota, U.S.
- Political party: Republican
- Education: University of South Dakota (BA, JD)

Mark V. Meierhenry (October 29, 1944 – July 29, 2020) was an American attorney from South Dakota. He was most notable for his service as the 26th Attorney General of South Dakota from 1979 to 1987.

== Early life and education ==
Meierhenry was born and raised in Gregory, South Dakota. He received his bachelor's degree from the University of South Dakota in 1966 and his J.D. in 1970, from the University of South Dakota School of Law.

== Legal career ==
Meierhenry served as the Director of South Dakota Legal Services and as an adjunct professor of Trial Practice and Indian Law before becoming South Dakota's Attorney General in 1979.

== 1978 Attorney General election ==
Meierhenry was elected Attorney General by defeating Democrat Max Gors. Mark received 141,891 (57.19%) votes; Max received 106,199 (42.81%) votes.

== 1982 Attorney General election ==
Meierhenry was reelected by defeating Democrat Rod Lefholz. Meierhenry received 153,728 (56.22%) votes; Lefholz received 119,697 (43.78%) votes.

== Attorney General of South Dakota (1979–1987) ==
While serving as Attorney General Meierhenry argued before the United States Supreme Court on behalf of South Dakota six times, victoriously on 3 occasions and on the losing end on the other trio.

=== St. Martin Lutheran Church v. South Dakota, 451 U.S. 772 (1981) ===
This case involved whether a church-operated school was exempt under federal law from unemployment compensation taxes. Attorney General Meierhenry argued on behalf of the state that the school was required to pay the tax; a unanimous Court ruled for the school.

=== South Dakota v. Neville, 459 U.S. 553 (1983) ===
Attorney General Meierhenry argued in defense of a state law that said that, although driver pulled over for DUI can refuse a blood alcohol test, that refusal can be used against the driver at trial – even if the driver was not so warned. The Court ruled 7-2 in favor of the state, upholding the law.

=== Solem v. Helm, 463 U.S. 277 (1983) ===
Helm had written a check on a fictitious account. Although the crime typically held a five-year maximum sentence, Helm was sentenced to life imprisonment as it was his seventh offense. Attorney General Meierhenry argued on behalf of the state, but the Court ruled 5-4 the life in prison was cruel and unusual for “relatively minor criminal conduct.”

(The defendant in this case, and in the next two, was Herman Solem, at the time the warden of the South Dakota State Penitentiary. When a prison inmate brings a habeas corpus case, challenging the legality of his imprisonment, the stated defendant is the warden.)

=== Solem v. Stumes, 465 U.S. 638 (1984) ===
Stumes was a suspect in a murder investigation. When he was arrested for unrelated reasons, police twice initiated questioning of the defendant, after he had requested counsel. After this incident, the U.S. Supreme Court had held in Edwards v. Arizona that if a defendant requests assistance of counsel, any subsequent interrogation should be suppressed until counsel is provided. In this case, Attorney General Meierhenry argued that Edwards should not be applied retroactively, because police at the time had no way to know about the Edwards ruling. The Court ruled for the state, 6-3.

=== Solem v. Bartlett, 465 U.S. 463 (1984) ===
In this case, the defendant had been convicted of attempted rape in a South Dakota state court and was held in the state penitentiary. He challenged the conviction, arguing that the crime had occurred on the Rosebud Indian Reservation, and therefore the state lacked jurisdiction. Thus, although this a habeas challenge to a rape conviction, it actually turned on the question of whether the site of the crime was on the reservation, or on land that had been diminished from the reservation by Congress. The Court unanimously ruled for Bartlett, holding that the land in question was still part of the Rosebud Indian Reservation.

=== Western Air Lines v. Bd. of Equalization, 480 U.S. 123 (1987) ===
Under federal law, a state could not assess a discriminatory tax on air carriers, unless the tax was “in lieu of” local taxes and the proceeds were used only to support aviation. South Dakota imposed a centrally-assessed tax on airline property. In 1978, the state abolished the personal property tax for most property, but left it in place for airlines. Western Air Lines argued that, because the underlying personal property tax had been abolished, the tax was no longer “in lieu of” another tax. The Court ruled unanimously for the state, holding that the tax complied with the federal statute.

== Personal life ==
Meierhenry died in Sioux Falls, South Dakota, on July 29, 2020, at the age of 75. He was the husband of the first female Associate Justice of the South Dakota Supreme Court, Judith Meierhenry who served in that capacity from 2002 to 2011.

Party political offices
| Preceded by Bill Janklow | Republican nominee for Attorney General of South Dakota; 1978, 1982 | Succeeded by Roger Tellinghuisen |
Legal offices
| Preceded by William Janklow | Attorney General of South Dakota; 1979–1987 | Succeeded by Roger Tellinghuisen |
