= Roger Tellinghuisen =

American politician

Roger Alan Tellinghuisen

27th Attorney General of South Dakota
- In office January 6, 1987 – 1991
- Governor: George S. Mickelson
- Preceded by: Mark V. Meierhenry
- Succeeded by: Mark Barnett

Personal details
- Born: March 27, 1953 (age 73)
- Party: Republican
- Education: Black Hills State University (BA); University of South Dakota (JD)

Roger Alan Tellinghuisen (born March 27, 1953) is an American attorney, was the 27th Attorney General of South Dakota from 1987 to 1991.

== Early life and education ==
Roger Tellinghuisen graduated from Black Hills State University with a degree in Business Administration in 1975 and obtained his J.D. from the University of South Dakota School of Law in 1978.

== Early legal career ==
Following graduation from law school, Roger joined the firm of Amundson and Fuller in Lead, South Dakota where he was engaged in private practice. In 1981, he left private practice to join the Lawrence County States Attorney's Office where he prosecuted felony and misdemeanor cases. In 1982, Roger was appointed the first full-time states attorney for Lawrence County where he was the chief legal counsel and criminal lawyer for the county providing legal counsel to the Board of County Commissioners, Planning and Zoning Commission and the other county offices.

== 1986 Attorney General Election ==
In 1986, he was elected in a statewide election to the office of Attorney General of South Dakota, at only the age of 33.

Roger won the Republican nomination for Attorney General at the South Dakota Republican Convention on June 27–28, 1986. On June 26, 1986, State Representative Scott Heidepriem withdrew from the race. On June 28, 1986, Meade County States Attorney Mike Jackley, who was a law school classmate of Roger's, withdrew before the voting commenced.

Roger defeated Democrat and Lincoln County States Attorney Jeff Masten by a vote of 153,871 (53.53%) for Roger to 133,577 (46.47%) for Jeff.

== Attorney General of South Dakota ==
As the Attorney General, he was the chief lawyer and law enforcement officer for the State of South Dakota. His duties as Attorney General included providing legal counsel to the Governor, constitutional officers, and various boards and commissions. He was responsible for overseeing five legal divisions staffed by 23 attorneys.

=== South Dakota v. Dole ===
In 1984, the United States Congress passed the National Minimum Drinking Age Act, which withheld 10% of federal highway funding from states that did not maintain a minimum legal drinking age of 21. South Dakota, which allowed 19-year-olds to purchase (raised from 18 years old as result of NMDAA) beer containing up to 3.2% alcohol, Tellinghuisen challenged the law on behalf of the state of South Dakota, naming Secretary of Transportation Elizabeth Dole as the defendant. Tellinghuisen petitioned the United States Supreme Court, which granted certiorari. He argued in front of the United States Supreme Court, although unsuccessfully (7-2), that the law was unduly coercive upon the state.

Tellinghuisen is a member of the United States Supreme Court Bar (where he argued South Dakota v. Elizabeth Dole, 107 S. Ct. 2793 (1987), the United States Court of Appeals, Eighth Circuit, United States District Court and South Dakota Bar Association.

== Later legal career ==
Following his service as Attorney General of South Dakota, Roger returned to private practice in 1991 with an emphasis in civil litigation, business law; real estate law, gaming law and lobbying. Roger recently joined the DeMersseman, Jensen, Tellinghuisen & Huffman, LLP law firm as a partner in 2011.

Roger is a member of the South Dakota Trial Lawyers Association and served as its president for the 2011–2012 term. He was a member of the Black Hills State University Foundation for 23 years, serving as its president for 17 of those years; he is a past president and board member of the Spearfish Chamber of Commerce and on numerous other boards and commissions. He has received numerous honors including being named a Great Plains Super Lawyer 2012 thru 2016; "125 Accomplished Alumni Award", Black Hills State University, 2008; a "Special Achievement Award" from Black Hills State University in 1990; South Dakota "Centennial Alumnus Award" in 1988; and the Outstanding Alumnus Award- Division of Business, Black Hills State University in 1988.

He holds the highest peer review rating awarded by Martindale-Hubble Law Directory (AV). Representative lobbying clients include: South Dakota Trial Lawyers Assoc.; Deadwood Gaming Assoc.; South Dakota County Officials Assoc.; South Dakota County Commissioners Association; College of American Pathologists; TracFone, Inc.; Deadwood Table Games, LLC; Aflac; and Liv Hospitality.

Party political offices
Preceded by Mark V. Meierhenry	Republican nominee for Attorney General of South Dakota; 1986	Succeeded by Mark Barnett
Legal offices
Preceded by Mark Meierhenry	Attorney General of South Dakota; 1987–1991	Succeeded by Mark Barnett
