= 1952 South Dakota gubernatorial election =

- November 4, 1952
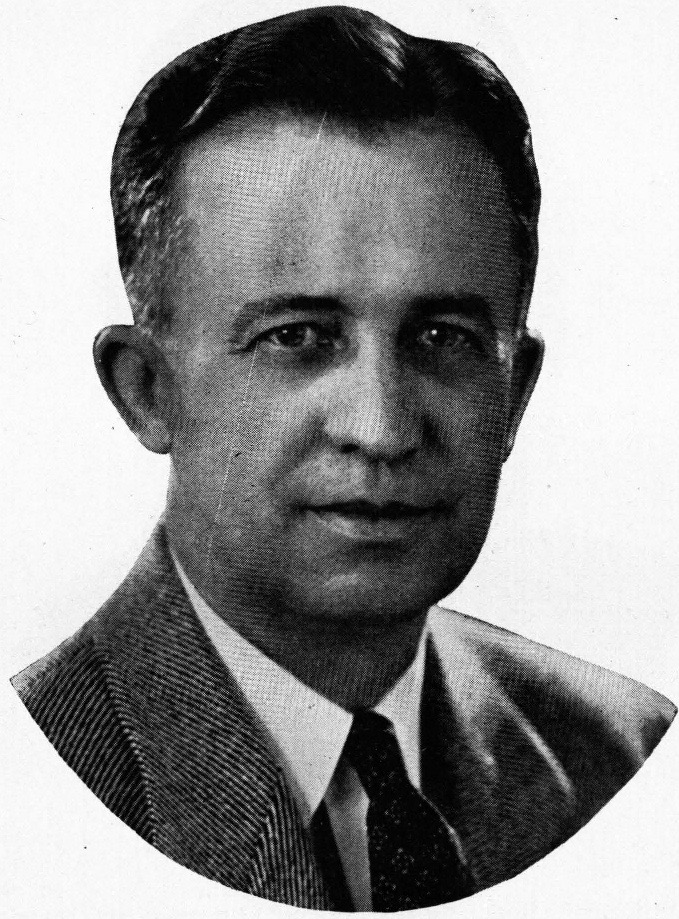

Nominee	Sigurd Anderson	Sherman A. Iverson
Party	Republican	Democratic
Popular vote	203,102	86,413
Percentage	70.15%	29.85%
- County results Anderson: 50–60% 60–70% 70–80% 80–90% >90%
Governor before election
Sigurd Anderson
Republican
Elected Governor
Sigurd Anderson
Republican

The 1952 South Dakota gubernatorial election was held on November 4, 1952.

Incumbent Republican Governor Sigurd Anderson was re-elected, defeating Democratic nominee Sherman A. Iverson with 70.15% of the vote. This is the only time that the winner of the South Dakota gubernatorial election won all counties in South Dakota.

== Primary elections ==
Primary elections were held on June 3, 1952.

=== Democratic primary ===
==== Candidates ====
- Sherman A. Iverson, Mayor of South Sioux Falls

==== Results ====
Democratic primary results
Party	Candidate	Votes	%
Democratic	Sherman A. Iverson	unopposed	
Total votes			

=== Republican primary ===
==== Candidates ====
- Sigurd Anderson, incumbent Governor

==== Results ====
Republican primary results
Party	Candidate	Votes	%
Republican	Sigurd Anderson (inc.)	unopposed	
Total votes			

== General election ==
=== Candidates ===
- Sherman A. Iverson, Democratic
- Sigurd Anderson, Republican

=== Results ===
1952 South Dakota gubernatorial election
Party	Candidate	Votes	%	±%
Republican	Sigurd Anderson (inc.)	203,102	70.15%	
Democratic	Sherman A. Iverson	86,413	29.85%	
Majority		116,689	40.30%	
Turnout		289,515	100.00%	
Republican hold		Swing		

== Bibliography ==
- Gubernatorial Elections, 1787-1997. Washington, D.C.: Congressional Quarterly Inc. 1998. ISBN 1-56802-396-0.
