= D. Walter Conway =

13th Attorney General of South Dakota

Daniel Walter Conway

13th Attorney General of South Dakota
- In office 1933–1937
- Governor: Tom Berry
- Preceded by: Merrell Q. Sharpe
- Succeeded by: Clair Roddewig

Personal details
- Born: November 3, 1898 Sioux Falls, South Dakota
- Died: October 11, 1956 (aged 57) Sioux Falls, South Dakota
- Party: Democratic Party (United States)
- Education: Creighton University
- Profession: Attorney

D. Walter Conway (November 3, 1898 - October 11, 1956) was an American politician who served as the 13th Attorney General of South Dakota from 1933 to 1937.

== Biography ==
Conway was born in Sioux Falls, South Dakota on November 3, 1898. He was educated in the parochial and high schools of Sioux Falls and at Columbus College in Chamberlain, South Dakota. He served in the U.S. Army during World War I. Upon returning from the war he attended Creighton University, from which he graduated with a Ph.B. degree in 1921. He then attended Creighton University School of Law, from which he received a LL.B. degree in 1924.

== Career ==
Conway was admitted to the bar and practiced in Sioux Falls. He served as a Deputy State's Attorney in Minnehaha County from 1929 to 1930. He then served as an Assistant City Attorney for Sioux Falls from 1931 to 1932, before being elected Attorney General of South Dakota as a Democrat in 1932 and 1934.

=== 1932 Attorney General election ===
Conway defeated incumbent Attorney General Merrell Q. Sharpe 135,393 to 128,644.

=== 1934 Attorney General election ===
Conway ran for re-election and defeated Republican nominee Roy A. Nord 158,553 to 112,764.

=== Municipal court judge ===
In 1942, Conway became municipal court judge of Sioux Falls. He served in this position until his death.

== Death ==
Conway died in Sioux Falls on October 11, 1956. He was buried at St. Michael's Cemetery in Sioux Falls.
