= Buell F. Jones =

American politician

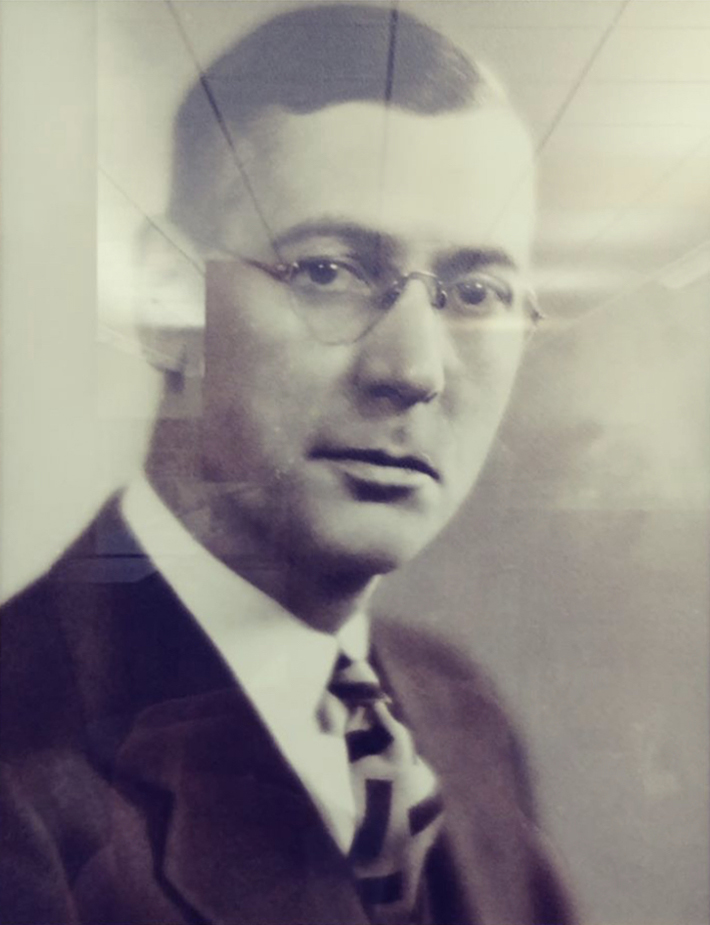

11th Attorney General of South Dakota
- In office 1923–1929
- Governor: William J. Bulow; Warren Green
- Preceded by: Byron S. Payne
- Succeeded by: Merrell Q. Sharpe

Personal details
- Born: November 25, 1888
- Died: November 17, 1947 (aged 54)
- Party: Republican
- Education: University of South Dakota School of Law
- Profession: Attorney

Buell F. Jones (November 25, 1892 – November 17, 1947) was an American attorney and 11th Attorney General of South Dakota between 1923 and 1929. Born in Spain, South Dakota, Buell graduated from the University of South Dakota School of Law. A member of the Republican Party, he was elected in 1922 as Attorney General of South Dakota. He was re-elected in 1924, 1926, and 1928.

Party political offices
Preceded by Byron S. Payne	Republican nominee for Attorney General of South Dakota; 1922, 1924, 1926	Succeeded by Merrell Q. Sharpe
Preceded by Carl Gunderson	Republican nominee for Governor of South Dakota; 1928	Succeeded by Warren Green
Legal offices
Preceded by Byron S. Payne	Attorney General of South Dakota; 1923-1929	Succeeded by Merrell Q. Sharpe
