= Leo A. Temmey =

American lawyer

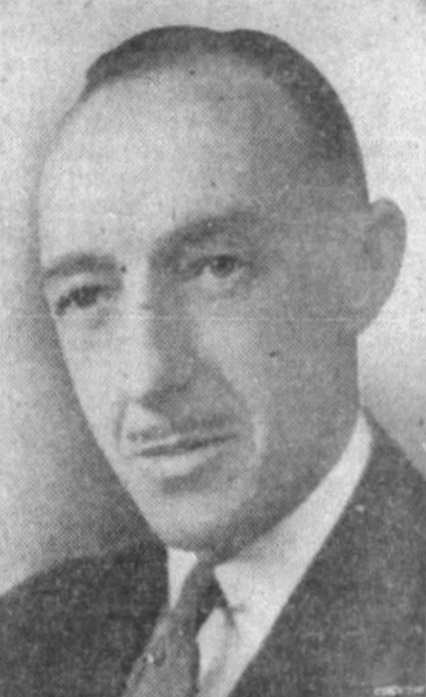
- Argus Leader, April 25, 1942

15th Attorney General of South Dakota
- In office 1939–1943
- Governor: Harlan J. Bushfield
- Preceded by: Clair Roddewig
- Succeeded by: George T. Mickelson

Personal details
- Born: November 6, 1894; Onida, South Dakota
- Died: April 22, 1975 (aged 80); Huron, South Dakota
- Political party: Republican
- Education: University of Minnesota (JD)
- Profession: Attorney

Leo A. Temmey (November 6, 1894 – April 22, 1975) was an American attorney and 15th attorney general of South Dakota between 1939 and 1943. He was born in Onida, South Dakota.

== Career ==
Temmey was a Republican.

Temmey graduated from the University of Minnesota School of Law.

=== 1938 attorney general election ===
On June 27, 1938, Temmey won the Republican nomination on the first ballot, defeating Charles H. McCay of Salem by a margin of 79,510 to 72,718 votes.

Temmey was elected attorney general by defeating incumbent Democrat attorney general Clair Roddewig by a margin of 144,125 to 123,671 votes.

=== 1940 attorney general election ===
Temmey was re-elected attorney general by defeating Democrat Andrew Foley by a margin of 170,269 to 122,173 votes.

=== 1942 gubernatorial election ===
Temmey ran for governor in 1942, but he was defeated.

Party political offices
Preceded by Sterling Clark	Republican nominee for Attorney General of South Dakota; 1938, 1940	Succeeded by George T. Mickelson
Legal offices
Preceded by Clair Roddewig	Attorney General of South Dakota; 1939-1943	Succeeded by George T. Mickelson
