= Ralph A. Dunham =

American politician

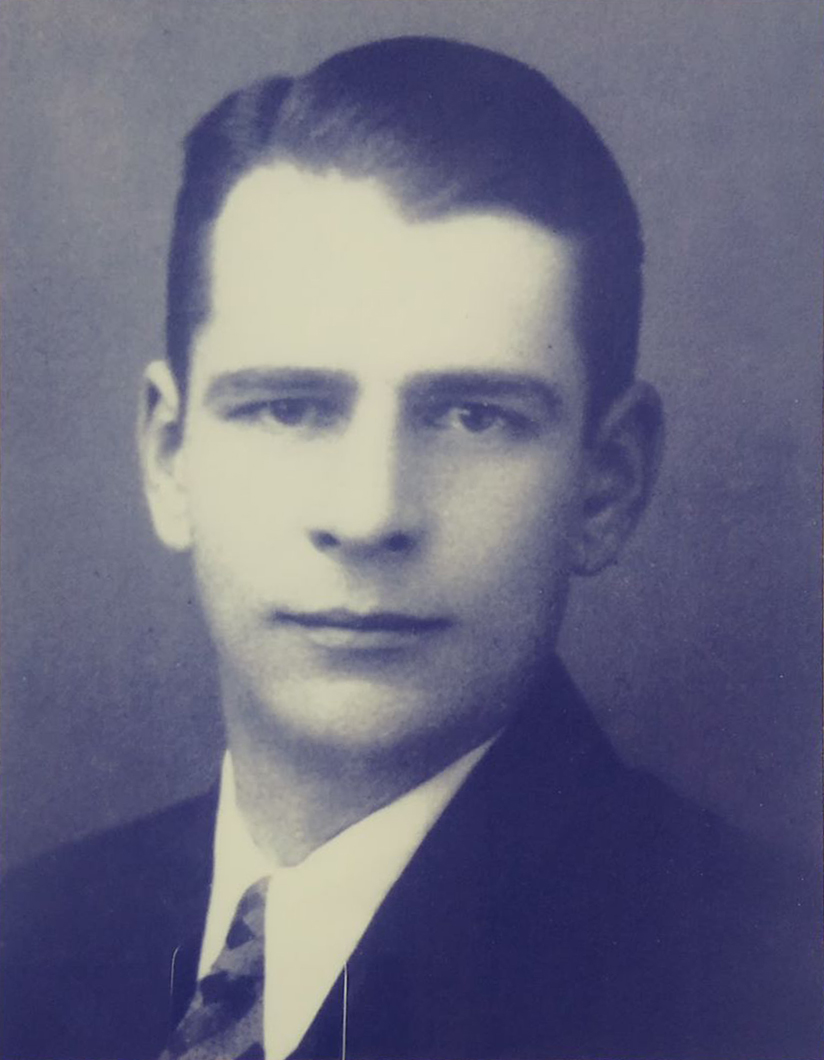

18th Attorney General of South Dakota
- In office 1951–1955
- Preceded by: Sigurd Anderson
- Succeeded by: Phil Saunders

Personal details
- Born: December 21, 1906 Clark, South Dakota
- Died: September 24, 1959 (aged 52)
- Party: Republican
- Education: University of Iowa College of Law
- Profession: Attorney

Ralph A. Dunham (December 21, 1906 – September 24, 1959) was an American attorney and 18th Attorney General of South Dakota between 1951 and 1955.

== Education and career ==
Dunham graduated from the University of Iowa College of Law.

=== 1950 Attorney General election ===
On July 10, 1950, the Democratic convention was held in Huron. George A. Bangs was nominated. Further candidates considered were Albert F. Ulmer of Menno, Ralph Hutchinson of Huron, William Holland of Webster, D.C. "Cliff" Walsh of Miller, the 1948 Democratic nominee decided that he would not run again.

On July 17, 1950, the Republican convention was held in Pierre. Five candidates competed: Gene Pruitt of Sioux Falls; Ralph Dunham of Clark; Rex Sheild of Salem; Dave MacFarlane of Montrose and Raymond Heib of Ipswich who withdrew before the voting began. Dunham and Sheild advanced and Dunham prevailed with the nomination.

Dunham was elected as Attorney General of South Dakota with 144,694 votes to Bangs 97,792 votes.

=== 1952 Attorney General election ===
On July 22, 1952, Dunham was re-nominated without opposition.

Dunham was re-elected as Attorney General with 187,888 votes with Democrat C.W. "Bill" Hyde receiving 94,396 votes.

Party political offices
Preceded by Sigurd Anderson	Republican nominee for Attorney General of South Dakota; 1950, 1952	Succeeded by Phil Saunders
Legal offices
Preceded by Sigurd Anderson	Attorney General of South Dakota; 1951-1955	Succeeded by Phil Saunders
