= Parnell J. Donahue =

20th Attorney General of South Dakota

Parnell J. Donohue

20th Attorney General of South Dakota
- In office 1959–1961
- Governor: Ralph Herseth
- Preceded by: Phil Saunders
- Succeeded by: Albert C. Miller

Personal details
- Born: July 18, 1916 Bonesteel, Gregory County, South Dakota
- Died: March 25, 1990 (aged 73)
- Party: Democratic
- Education: University of South Dakota (L.L.B.)

Parnell J. Donohue (July 18, 1916 – March 25, 1990) was an American attorney and the 20th Attorney General of South Dakota.

== Early life and education ==
He received his LL.B. from the University of South Dakota School of Law in 1938.

== Legal career ==
Donohue was elected as the Gregory County States Attorney in 1946 and served there until his election as Attorney General in 1958.

He was elected the 20th Attorney General of South Dakota in 1959, he is one of only four Democratic Attorneys General in South Dakota history.

=== 1958 Attorney General Election ===
On July 13, 1958, George Wuest of Lake Andes, the Charles Mix County Attorney from 1953 to 1954, was nominated by the Republican party for Attorney General. Wuest defeated Walter Mueller of Yankton after considerable support grew for Donn Bennett, Buffalo, who decided not to run because of the lateness of the hour. Wuest received 81,070 votes to 77,479 for Mueller.

On July 21, 1958, Donohue won the uncontested Democratic nomination at their convention in Watertown.

On November 4, 1958, Donohue defeated Wuest by securing 126,225 votes to 122,332 for Wuest.

=== 1960 Attorney General Election ===
Donohue was defeated in his bid for re-election by A.C. Miller with Miller receiving 160,299 votes while Donahue received 138,320 votes.

Legal offices
Preceded by Phil Saunders	Attorney General of South Dakota; 1959-1961	Succeeded by Albert C. Miller
