= Rex Terry =

American politician

Rex A. Terry
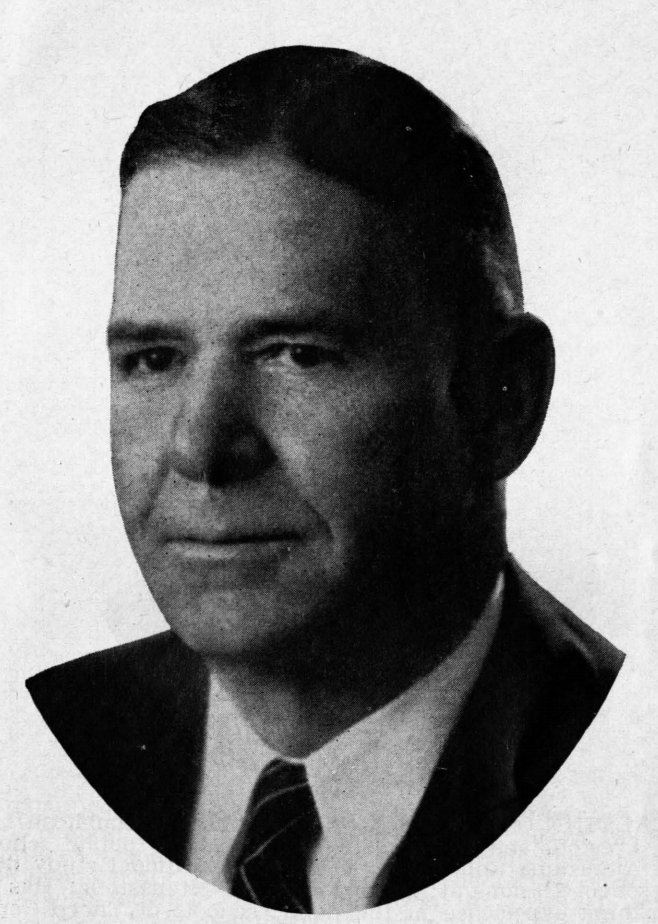

24th Lieutenant Governor of South Dakota
- In office 1949–1955
- Governor: George T. Mickelson; Sigurd Anderson
- Preceded by: Sioux K. Grigsby
- Succeeded by: L. Roy Houck

Personal details
- Born: February 21, 1888 Sturgis, Dakota Territory
- Died: July 13, 1964 (aged 76) Pierre, South Dakota
- Party: Republican
- Spouse: Delia Campbell

Rex A. Terry (February 21, 1888 – July 13, 1964) was a banker and politician in the United States state of South Dakota. He served as a member of the South Dakota State Senate and as Lieutenant Governor of South Dakota.

== Early life and education ==
Terry was born at Sturgis, Dakota Territory in 1888. After attending public schools and business college, Terry worked in retail in Fort Pierre, South Dakota, where he also acted as president of the Fort Pierre Commercial Club along with managing the Fort Pierre National Bank. He had also been a commissioner of Fort Pierre.

== Political career ==
Terry was elected to the South Dakota Senate as a Republican in 1941 to represent the 29th district (Stanley County). He served until 1948. He served as Lieutenant Governor from 1949 to 1955, under Governors George T. Mickelson and Sigurd Anderson.

== Personal life ==
In 1953, Terry escaped a two-car accident, sustaining minor injuries, between Pierre and Fort Pierre that left his car "almost a total wreck".

He married Delia Campbell in 1916. Terry was active within the South Dakota Masons, serving as Grand Master from 1944 to 1945. He had previously served as a Deputy Grand Master prior to his promotion to Grand Master in 1944.

== Death and legacy ==
He died in 1964 at a hospital in Pierre. He was buried at Scotty Phillips National Cemetery after a service at the masonic temple in Pierre. Upon his death, The Sioux Falls Argus-Leader lauded Terry's accomplishments, stating that his career "exemplified the best in American citizenship and the South Dakota way of life.".

Political offices
Preceded by Sioux K. Grigsby	Lieutenant Governor of South Dakota; 1949–1955	Succeeded by L. Roy Houck
Preceded by C. J. Wilson	Member of the South Dakota Senate from the 29th District; 1941–1948	Succeeded by Edwin G. Roller
