= Mark Barnett (lawyer) =

American politician

28th Attorney General of South Dakota
- In office 1991–2003
- Governor: George S. Mickelson; Walter Dale Miller; William J. Janklow
- Preceded by: Roger Tellinghuisen
- Succeeded by: Larry Long

Personal details
- Born: September 4, 1954 (age 72) Sioux Falls, South Dakota, U.S.
- Party: Republican
- Education: University of South Dakota (JD)
- Profession: Attorney

Mark Barnett (born September 4, 1954) is an American attorney; the 28th attorney general of South Dakota between 1991 and 2003 and a circuit court judge between 2007 and 2019.

== Legal career ==
Barnett, a Republican, graduated from the University of South Dakota School of Law.

== Electoral history ==
=== 1990 attorney general election ===
Barnett won the general election by defeating Michael Butler. He won with 150,109 (59.49%) votes while Butler received 102,231 votes (40.51%).

=== 1994 attorney general election ===
Barnett was re-elected by defeating Democrat Randy Turner and Libertarian Bert Olson. Barnett received 192,147 (62.33%) votes; Randy received 106,709 (34.62%) votes and Bert received 9,410 (3.05%) votes.

=== 1998 attorney general election ===
Barnett was elected for a third term as attorney general. He was unopposed for the first time in the history of attorney general elections in South Dakota.

As of October, 2019, Barnett is the longest-serving attorney general in South Dakota history, with 12 years of service.

== Supreme Court litigation ==
Barnett argued two cases before the United States Supreme Court as attorney general, winning both cases.

=== South Dakota v. Bourland, 508 U.S. 679 (1993) ===
Barnett argued on behalf of the state, winning a 7–2 decision that the federal Flood Control and Cheyenne River Acts had abrogated the tribe's right, guaranteed under the Fort Laramie Treaty, to regulate hunting and fishing on their lands by non-Indians.

=== South Dakota v. Yankton Sioux Tribe, 522 U.S. 329 (1998) ===
Barnett argued that an 1894 federal statute, ratifying an agreement pursuant to the Dawes Act, had diminished the boundaries of the Yankton Sioux Reservation, as they had been established in an 1858 treaty. The Court ruled unanimously for the state.

== 2002 gubernatorial election ==
Barnett ran for governor, but finished second in a divisive three-way primary for the 2002 Republican nomination. Mike Rounds won the nomination with 49,331 (44.34%) votes; Barnett received 32,868 (29.54%) votes and former lieutenant governor Steve T. Kirby received 29,065 (26.12%).

== State judicial service ==
In 2007, Barnett was appointed as a circuit court judge by Governor Mike Rounds. In 2014, he was reelected in an uncontested election. Barnett retired from the bench on March 22, 2019.

Party political offices
Preceded by Roger Tellinghuisen	Republican nominee for Attorney General of South Dakota; 1990, 1994, 1998	Succeeded by Larry Long
Legal offices
Preceded by Roger Tellinghuisen	Attorney General of South Dakota; 1991–2003	Succeeded by Larry Long
