= 1928 South Dakota gubernatorial election =

1928 South Dakota election

- November 6, 1928
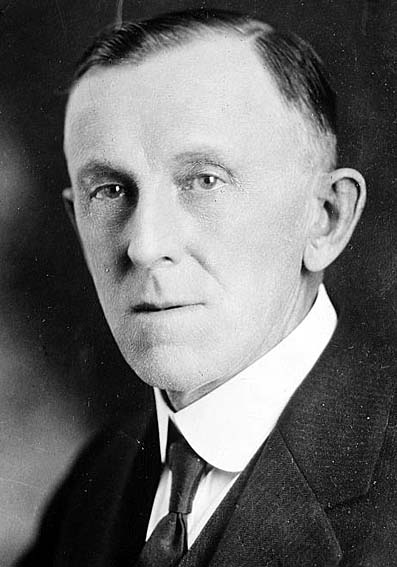

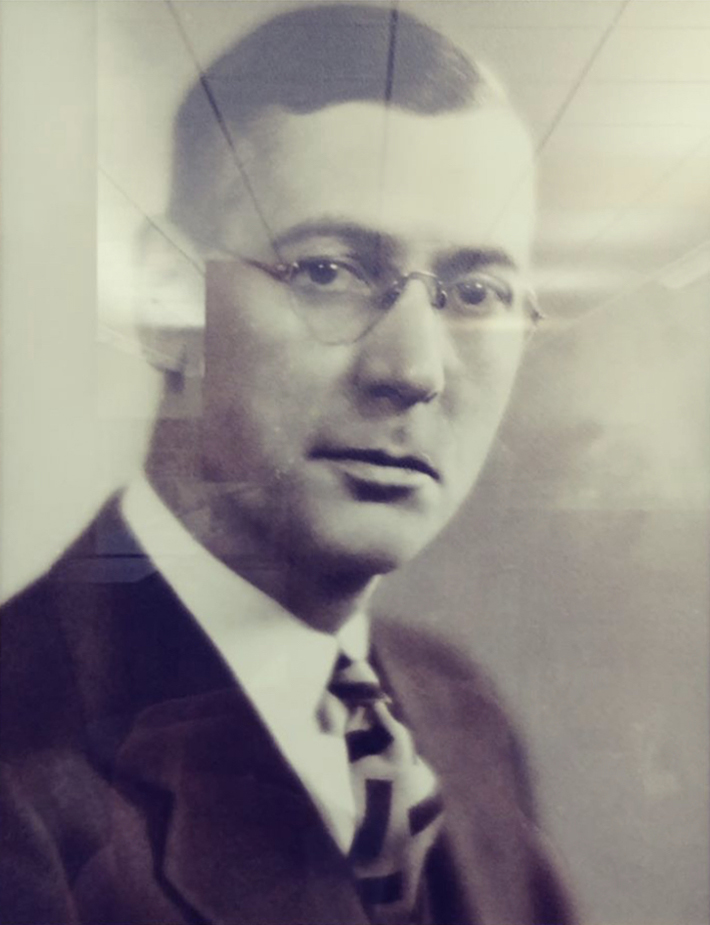
Nominee	William J. Bulow	Buell F. Jones
Party	Democratic	Republican
Popular vote	136,016	121,643
Percentage	52.48%	46.94%
- County results Bulow: 50–60% 60–70% 80–90% Jones: 40–50% 50–60% 60–70%
Governor of South Dakota before election
William J. Bulow
Democratic
Elected Governor of South Dakota
William J. Bulow
Democratic

The 1928 South Dakota gubernatorial election was held on November 6, 1928. Incumbent Democratic Governor William J. Bulow ran for re-election to a second term. In the general election, he faced Attorney General Buell F. Jones, the Republican nominee. Despite Republican presidential nominee Herbert Hoover overwhelmingly defeating Democratic nominee Al Smith overwhelmingly in South Dakota, Bulow defeated Jones by a decisive margin to retain the governorship. In so doing, he became the first Democratic candidate for Governor to receive a majority of the vote in the state's history.

== Democratic primary ==
Governor Bulow was renominated by the Democratic Party without opposition and no primary election was held.

== Republican primary ==
In accordance with the complicated Richards primary law, which governed party nominations in South Dakota at the time, the Republican Party held a convention to select its statewide nominees; however, if a requisite number of delegates opposed the candidates selected by the majority, they could force a primary election to be held. Seven Republican candidates ran for the governorship:

- Lieutenant Governor H. E. Covey
- Attorney General Buell F. Jones
- State Auditor E. A. Jones
- State Senator Brooke Howell
- State Senator D. R. Perkins
- Former State Secretary of Agriculture B. F. Myers
- C. M. Day, editor of the Argus Leader

In the lead-up to the Republican convention, Jones, Day, and Howell were seen as the likeliest candidates, with the contest likely coming down to Jones and Day.

At the convention, Jones took a leading position, remaining in first place on the first ballot, but still standing several thousand votes short of victory. Over subsequent ballots, he got closer and closer, and lagging candidates removed themselves from contention. Only on the fifth ballot did Jones receive the requisite vote to win the nomination.

== Farmer–Labor primary ==
=== Candidates ===
- John Sumption
- G. L. Hasvold

=== Campaign ===
At the March 1928 Farmer–Labor convention, John Sumption won the party's nomination; however, a minority faction at the convention favoring G. L. Hasvold dissented from Sumption's nomination and forced a primary. With just a few hundred voters turning out, Sumption defeated Hasvold to win the party's nomination.

=== Results ===
Farmer–Labor primary
Party	Candidate	Votes	%
Farmer–Labor	John G. Sumption	250	60.10%
Farmer–Labor	G. L. Hasvold	166	39.90%
Total votes		416	100.00%

== General election ==
=== Results ===
1928 South Dakota gubernatorial election
Party	Candidate	Votes	%	±%
Democratic	William J. Bulow (inc.)	136,016	52.48%	+5.08%
Republican	Buell F. Jones	121,643	46.94%	+6.63%
Farmer–Labor	John G. Sumption	1,509	0.58%	−5.92%
Majority		14,373	5.55%	−1.54%
Turnout		259,168	100.00%	
Democratic hold				
