= 1938 South Dakota gubernatorial election =

- November 8, 1938
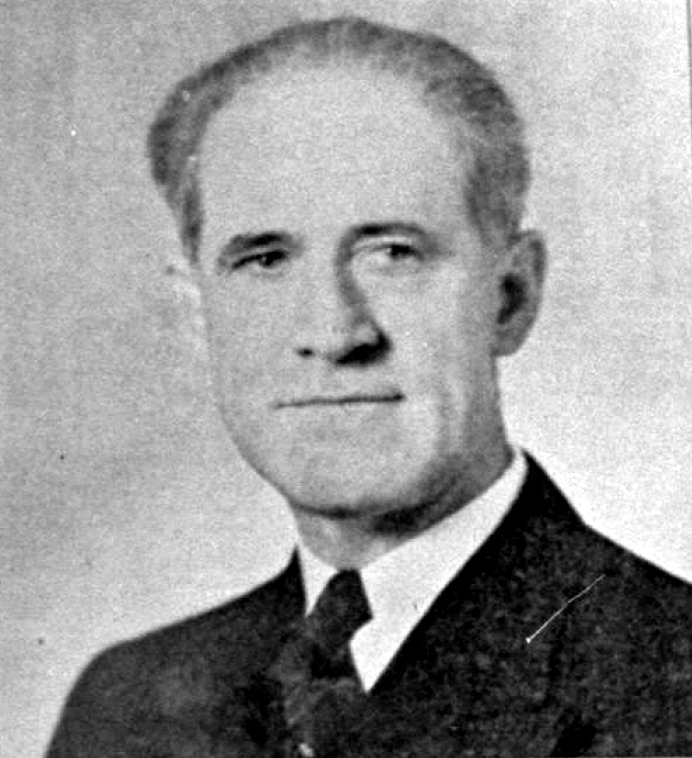

Nominee	Harlan J. Bushfield	Oscar Fosheim
Party	Republican	Democratic
Popular vote	149,362	127,485
Percentage	53.95%	46.05%
- County results Bushfield: 50–60% 60–70% 70–80% 90–100% Fosheim: 50–60%
Governor of South Dakota before election
Leslie Jensen
Republican
Elected Governor of South Dakota
Harlan J. Bushfield
Republican

The 1938 South Dakota gubernatorial election was held on November 8, 1938. Incumbent Republican Governor Leslie Jensen declined to seek re-election and instead unsuccessfully ran for the U.S. Senate. Harlan J. Bushfield, the former chairman of the South Dakota Republican Party, won the Republican primary to succeed Jensen. In the general election, he faced Democratic nominee Oscar Fosheim, a state representative from Miner County, in the general election. Bushfield defeated Fosheim by a relatively close margin, winning his first term as governor.

== Democratic primary ==
=== Candidates ===
- Oscar Fosheim, State Representative from Miner County
- Mancel W. Peterson, State Senator from Day County, former State Senate President

=== Results ===
Democratic primary
Party	Candidate	Votes	%
Democratic	Oscar Fosheim	42,422	62.04%
Democratic	Mancel W. Peterson	25,956	37.96%
Total votes		68,378	100.00%

== Republican primary ==
=== Candidates ===
- Harlan J. Bushfield, former chairman of the South Dakota Republican Party, former Hand County State's Attorney
- Blaine Simons, state senator from Minnehaha County

=== Results ===
Republican primary
Party	Candidate	Votes	%
Republican	Harlan J. Bushfield	64,929	65.72%
Republican	Blaine Simons	33,871	34.28%
Total votes		98,800	100.00%

== General election ==
=== Results ===
1938 South Dakota gubernatorial election
Party	Candidate	Votes	%	±%
Republican	Harlan J. Bushfield	149,362	53.95%	+2.35%
Democratic	Oscar Fosheim	127,485	46.05%	−2.35%
Majority		21,877	7.90%	+4.70%
Turnout		276,847	100.00%	
Republican hold				
