= 1944 South Dakota gubernatorial election =

- November 7, 1944
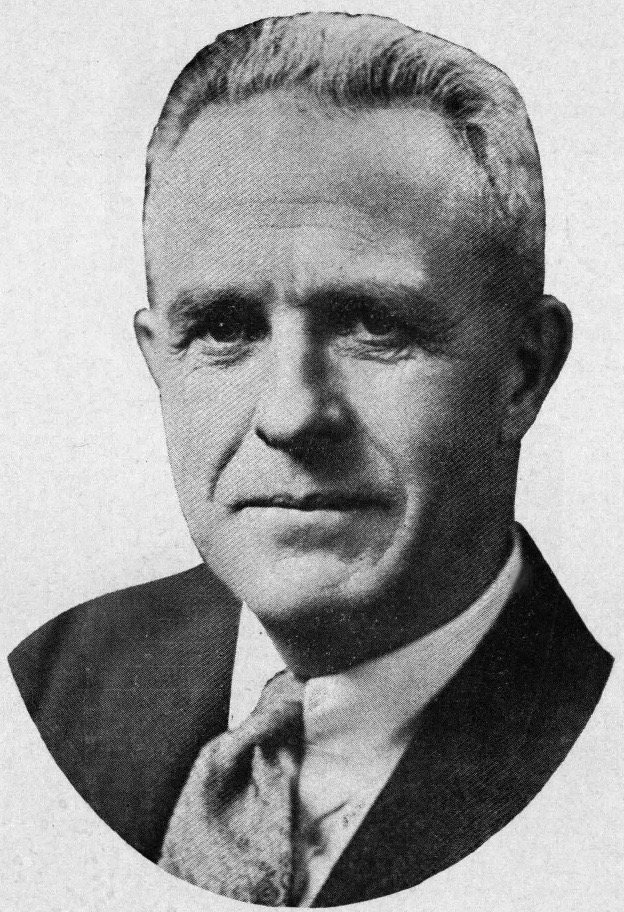

Nominee	Merrell Q. Sharpe	Lynn Fellows
Party	Republican	Democratic
Popular vote	148,646	78,276
Percentage	65.51%	34.49%
- County results Sharpe: 50–60% 60–70% 70–80% 80–90% Fellows: 70–80%
Governor before election
Merrell Q. Sharpe
Republican
Elected Governor
Merrell Q. Sharpe
Republican

The 1944 South Dakota gubernatorial election was held on November 7, 1944. Incumbent Republican Governor Merrell Q. Sharpe ran for re-election to a second term. He was opposed by Lynn Fellows, a former State Representative from Aurora County the 1942 Democratic nominee for Attorney General, in the general election; both Sharpe and Fellows won their primaries unopposed. In the general election, Sharpe easily defeated Fellows, far outpacing even Republican presidential nominee Thomas E. Dewey, who won the state in a landslide.

== Results ==
1944 South Dakota gubernatorial election
Party	Candidate	Votes	%	±%
Republican	Merrell Q. Sharpe (inc.)	148,646	65.51%	+4.00%
Democratic	Lynn Fellows	78,276	34.49%	−4.00%
Majority		70,370	31.01%	+8.00%
Turnout		226,922	100.00%	
Republican hold				

== Bibliography ==
- Gubernatorial Elections, 1787-1997. Washington, D.C.: Congressional Quarterly Inc. 1998. ISBN 1-56802-396-0.
