= Sioux K. Grigsby =

American lawyer and politician

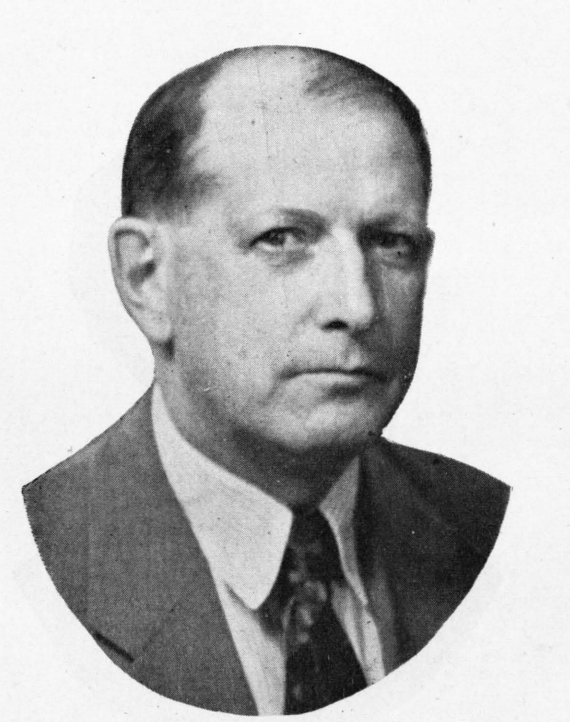

23rd Lieutenant Governor of South Dakota
- In office 1945–1949
- Governor: Merrill Q. Sharpe; George T. Mickelson
- Preceded by: A. C. Miller
- Succeeded by: Rex A. Terry

Member of the South Dakota Senate
- In office 1939-1945

Member of the South Dakota House of Representatives
- In office 1937-1939

Personal details
- Born: December 25, 1873 Sioux Falls, Dakota Territory
- Died: August 21, 1968 (aged 94) Sioux Falls, South Dakota
- Party: Republican
- Spouse(s): Alice Josephine Tyler; Anna Gilchriest
- Education: University of South Dakota
- Profession: attorney, farmer

Sioux Kingsbury Grigsby (December 25, 1873 – August 21, 1968) was an attorney and politician in the United States state of South Dakota. Grigsby was born into a prominent pioneering family, Kingsbury family in South Dakota and set up a law practice which he would maintain for over 60 years. Grigsby served as state representative, state senator, and Lieutenant Governor of South Dakota from 1945 to 1949.

== Early life and education ==
Grigsby was born in Sioux Falls in 1873 in what was then the Dakota Territory. His father was Colonel Melvin Grigsby, an American Civil War and Spanish–American War veteran who wrote a book about his experiences escaping from Confederate captivity called The Smoked Yank. Grigsby attended public schools followed by the University of South Dakota. His mother was Fannie Louise Kingsbury, originally of New York and of the prominent Kingsbury family for which Kingsbury County, South Dakota is named. Sioux Grigsby's brothers were George Barnes Grigsby, a prominent South Dakota state politician, and John (Jack) Thomas Grigsby, former Lieutenant Governor of South Dakota from 1929 to 1931. Sioux also had a sister, Frances Louise Grigsby (later Mrs. George Edwin Robinson). Grigsby attended public schools followed by the University of South Dakota.

== Career and politics ==
After being admitted to the state bar, Sioux Grigsby served as the assistant Attorney General of South Dakota with his father as Attorney General. Grigsby also served as the city attorney for Sioux Falls from 1908 to 1909. Grigsby was elected to the South Dakota House of Representatives in 1937 for Minnehaha County, and he served for two years, until 1939, when he was elected to the South Dakota State Senate, where he served until 1945, when he was named lieutenant governor. He had originally planned to run for the state senate again in 1945 but promptly withdrew his candidacy when he was nominated as lieutenant governor. As lieutenant governor, he served alongside governors Merrill Q. Sharpe and George T. Mickelson. He also served in the capacity of acting governor briefly in 1947. Active in the Minnehaha County, South Dakota, American Bar Associations and state Taxpayers' Association, Grigsby was one of the more well-known Republicans in South Dakota, even being crowned "Mr. Republican" of the state in 1955. He also maintained a farm in Minnehaha County.

== Personal life ==
Sioux married Alice Josephine Tyler in 1899. They had no children. Sioux married Anna Gilchriest in 1917. They had two children, Suzanne (later Mrs. Russell Woolley) and William.

== Death ==
Sioux died on August 21, 1968, at a hospital in Sioux Falls. He was reportedly one of the oldest residents of Sioux Falls at the time. He had previously retired from his law practice in 1966, after nearly 70 continuous years of practice, due to poor health. Sioux was survived by his wife Anna, daughter Suzanne, and son William. An obituary of him at the time lauded him in that "his career ... [had] paralleled the development of his city and state".

He is interred at Mount Pleasant Cemetery in Sioux Falls.

Political offices
| Preceded by A. C. Miller | Lieutenant Governor of South Dakota; 1945–1949 | Succeeded by Rex A. Terry |
| Preceded by ? | Member of the South Dakota House of Representatives; 1937–1939 | Succeeded by ? |
| Preceded by David J. Tiede | Member of the South Dakota Senate from the 7th District; 1939–1945 | Succeeded by W. T. Knudtson |
