= 1940 South Dakota gubernatorial election =

- November 5, 1940
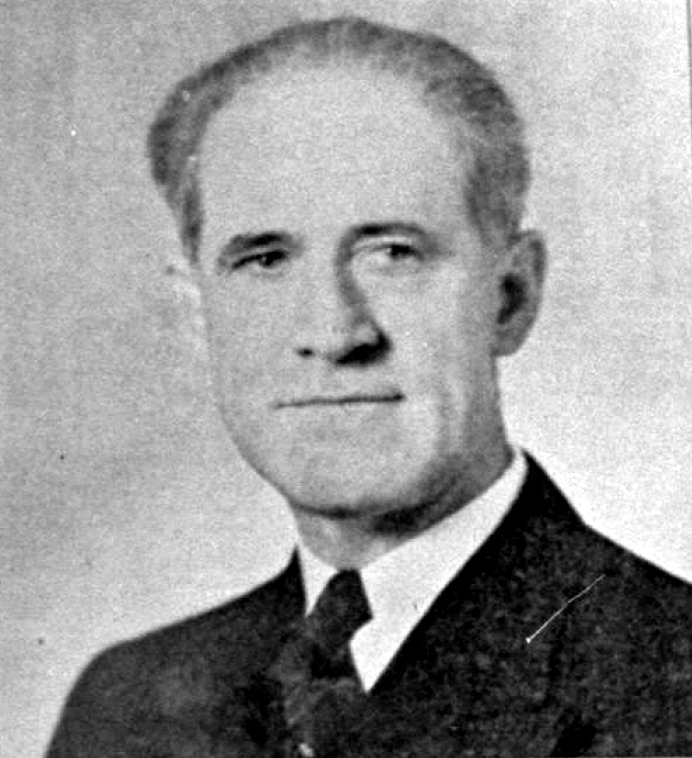

Nominee	Harlan J. Bushfield	Lewis W. Bicknell
Party	Republican	Democratic
Popular vote	167,686	136,428
Percentage	55.14%	44.86%
- County results Bushfield: 50–60% 60–70% 70–80% 80–90% Bicknell: 50–60% 60–70%
Governor of South Dakota before election
Harlan J. Bushfield
Republican
Elected Governor of South Dakota
Harlan J. Bushfield
Republican

The 1940 South Dakota gubernatorial election was held on November 5, 1940. Incumbent Republican Governor Harlan J. Bushfield sought re-election to a second term. After winning the Republican primary by a large margin, he faced Democrat Lewis W. Bicknell, former Day County State's Attorney, in the general election. Though Bushfield underperformed Republican presidential nominee Wendell Willkie, who won the state in a landslide, he nonetheless defeated Bicknell by a wide margin to easily win re-election.

== Democratic primary ==
=== Candidates ===
- Lewis W. Bicknell, former Day County State's Attorney, former chairman of the State Department of Public Welfare, 1932 Democratic candidate for the U.S. Senate
- Almer O. Steensland, former state representative from Charles Mix County

=== Results ===
Democratic primary
Party	Candidate	Votes	%
Democratic	Lewis W. Bicknell	31,790	60.80%
Democratic	Almer O. Steensland	20,500	39.20%
Total votes		52,290	100.00%

== Republican primary ==
=== Candidates ===
- Harlan J. Bushfield, incumbent governor
- Adolph N. Graff, former mayor of Sioux Falls, South Dakota, former state representative from Minnehaha County

=== Results ===
Republican primary
Party	Candidate	Votes	%
Republican	Harlan J. Bushfield (inc.)	84,992	78.43%
Republican	Adolph N. Graff	23,377	21.57%
Total votes		108,369	100.00%

== General election ==
=== Results ===
1940 South Dakota gubernatorial election
Party	Candidate	Votes	%	±%
Republican	Harlan J. Bushfield (inc.)	167,686	55.14%	+1.19%
Democratic	Lewis W. Bicknell	136,428	44.86%	−1.19%
Majority		31,258	10.28%	+2.38%
Turnout		304,114	100.00%	
Republican hold				
