= 1942 United States Senate election in South Dakota =

- November 3, 1942
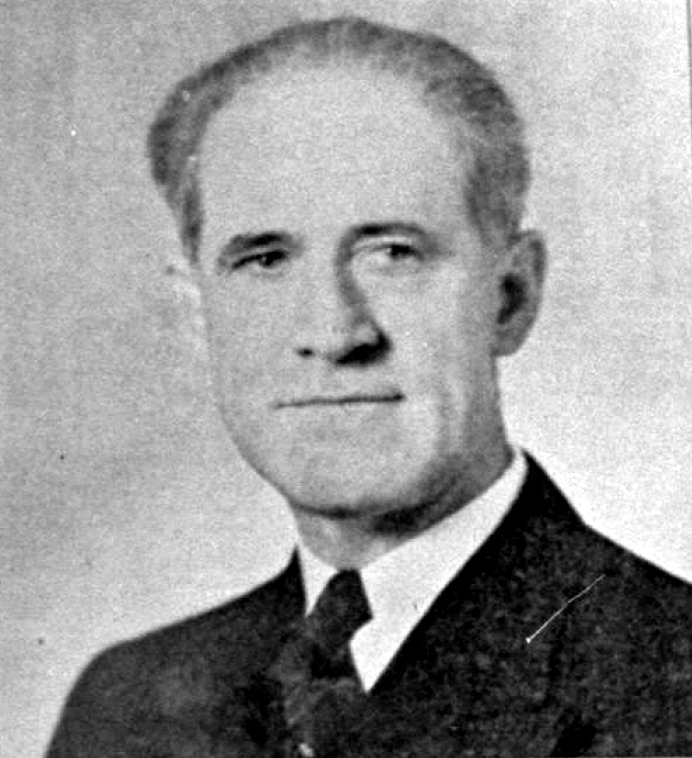

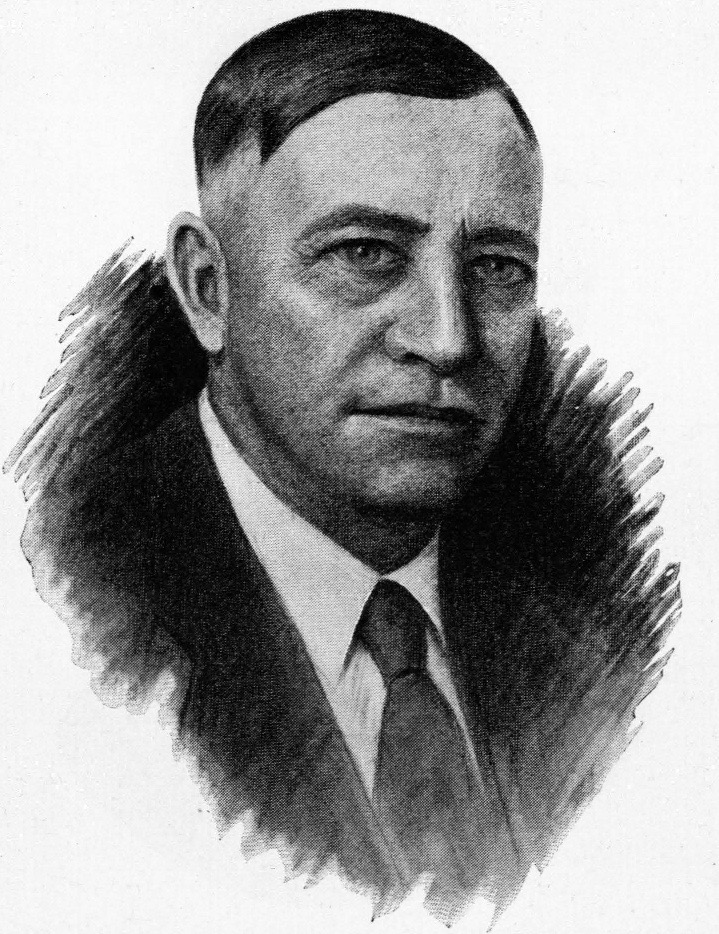
Nominee	Harlan J. Bushfield	Tom Berry
Party	Republican	Democratic
Popular vote	106,704	74,945
Percentage	58.74%	41.26%
- County results Bushfield: 50–60% 60–70% 70–80% 80–90% Berry: 50–60% 60–70% No Vote
U.S. senator before election
William J. Bulow
Democratic
Elected U.S. Senator
Harlan J. Bushfield
Republican

The 1942 United States Senate election in South Dakota took place on November 3, 1942. Incumbent Democratic Senator William J. Bulow ran for re-election to a third term. During the primary, Bulow was attacked for being insufficiently supportive of President Franklin Roosevelt's foreign policy and war preparedness. Former Governor Tom Berry, Bulow's chief opponent, drew a contrast between Bulow's isolationism and his support for Roosevelt's policies. In the end, Berry defeated Bulow in a landslide, and advanced to the general election, where he faced Harlan J. Bushfield, the incumbent Republican Governor of South Dakota. As Republicans gained ground nationwide, Bushfield defeated Berry in a landslide to pick up the seat for the Republican Party. Bushfield did not serve his full term, however; shortly before the 1948 U.S. Senate election, he died.

== Democratic primary ==
=== Candidates ===
- Tom Berry, former Governor of South Dakota
- William J. Bulow, incumbent U.S. Senator
- Edward Prchal, former member of the South Dakota Board of Regents

=== Results ===
Democratic primary
Party	Candidate	Votes	%
Democratic	Tom Berry	25,454	64.60%
Democratic	William J. Bulow (inc.)	10,956	27.80%
Democratic	Edward Prchal	2,994	7.60%
Total votes		39,404	100.00%

== Republican primary ==
=== Candidates ===
- Harlan J. Bushfield, Governor of South Dakota
- Olive A. Ringsrud, Secretary of State of South Dakota

=== Results ===
Republican primary
Party	Candidate	Votes	%
Republican	Harlan J. Bushfield	52,342	63.32%
Republican	Olive A. Ringsrud	30,325	36.68%
Total votes		82,667	100.00%

== General election ==
=== Results ===
1942 United States Senate election in South Dakota
Party	Candidate	Votes	%	±%
Republican	Harlan J. Bushfield	106,704	58.74%	+12.00%
Democratic	Tom Berry	74,945	41.26%	−7.57%
Majority		31,759	17.48%	+15.40%
Turnout		181,649	100.00%	
Republican gain from Democratic				
