= Sigurd Anderson =

American politician (1904–1990)

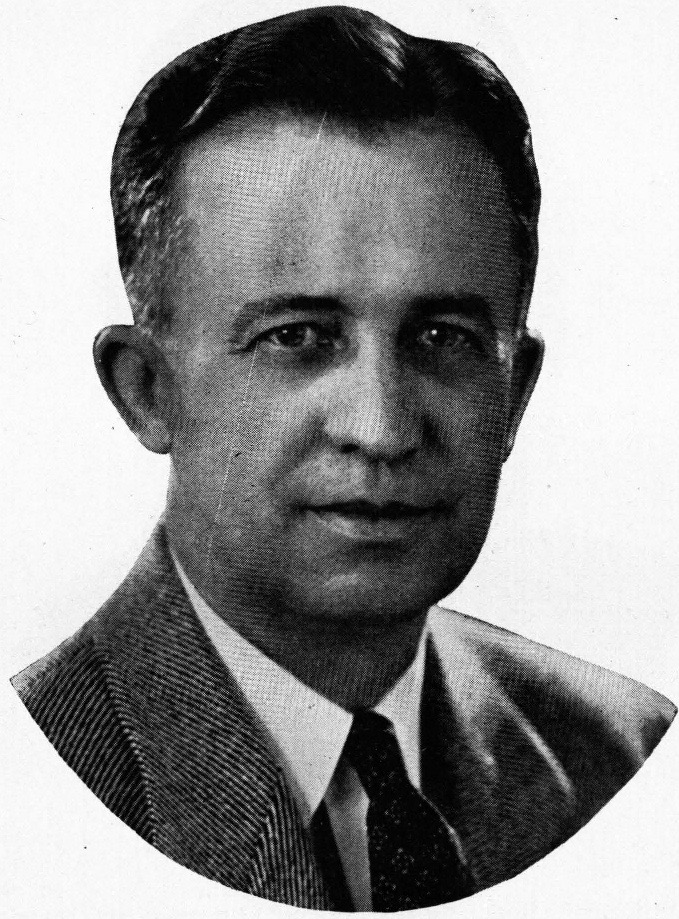

19th Governor of South Dakota
- In office January 2, 1951 – January 4, 1955
- Lieutenant: Rex A. Terry
- Preceded by: George T. Mickelson
- Succeeded by: Joe Foss

17th Attorney General of South Dakota
- In office 1947–1951
- Governor: George T. Mickelson
- Preceded by: George T. Mickelson
- Succeeded by: Ralph A. Dunham

Personal details
- Born: January 22, 1904 Arendal, Aust-Agder, Norway
- Died: December 21, 1990 (aged 86) Webster, South Dakota, U.S.
- Party: Republican
- Spouse: Vivian Walz (m. 1937)
- Education: South Dakota State University; University of South Dakota (BA, JD)
- Profession: Attorney

Sigurd Anderson (January 22, 1904 – December 21, 1990) was the 19th governor of South Dakota. Anderson, a Republican from Webster, South Dakota, served in that office from 1951 to 1955.

== Early life and education ==
Anderson was born at Frolands Verk, a rural community near Arendal, in the county of Aust-Agder, Norway and came to the United States at age three with his family to settle in Lincoln County, South Dakota. Sigurd became a United States citizen at age eight, when his father became a naturalized citizen. Anderson graduated from the Canton Lutheran Normal, in Canton, South Dakota, and enrolled at South Dakota State College. During his first school year, Anderson suffered from scarlet fever, which prevented his return to college the following fall. In order to secure funds to continue his education, Anderson worked as a farm hand and taught rural school at Kruger #1 school house in Kingsbury County. In 1928, Anderson enrolled at the University of South Dakota, and graduated in 1931 with cum laude honors and a B.A. degree and went on to earn his LL.B degree from University of South Dakota School of Law. In 1937, he married Vivian Walz of Vermillion and began practicing law in Webster. Their daughter, Kristin Karen, was born during Anderson's administration.

== Career ==
Anderson twice served as Day County state's attorney and as an assistant attorney general in the state capital, Pierre. Before he was elected governor he served two terms as South Dakota Attorney General, 1947–1951.

=== 1946 Attorney General election ===
On July 9, 1946, at the Republican convention, Anderson defeated I.R. Erickson of Vermillion; Anderson received 72,220 votes to 68,695 votes for Erickson.

In the general election, Anderson defeated Democrat Albert F. Ulmer by a count of 106,502 votes to 50,480 votes.

=== 1948 Attorney General election ===
In 1948, Anderson was re-nominated without opposition at the Republican convention in Pierre.

In the general election, Anderson was re-elected as Attorney General by defeating D.C. Walsh by a 137,370 to 99,724 vote margin.

=== Gubernatorial administration ===
Anderson's re-election in 1952 marked the first time a candidate for South Dakota governor received more than 200,000 votes in a general election. This was not accomplished again until Mike Rounds' reelection in 2006, over fifty years later. It was during Anderson's administration that the Legislative Research Council was established. It was also during this time that the state had a debt-free status—the first time in 40 years.

After his service as governor, he served as a commissioner on the Federal Trade Commission.

In 1964, Anderson once again announced his candidacy for governor, but lost the GOP gubernatorial primary to Nils Boe, who won the general election. Boe appointed Anderson to fill a vacancy as a circuit judge, from which position Anderson retired in 1975.

== Death and legacy ==
Anderson died on December 21, 1990, and was interred in Webster Cemetery, Webster, South Dakota.

He received dozens of professional and political honors and was a member of numerous organizations. He was a member of the Lutheran Church, Masonic Lodge and affiliated bodies, Phi Beta Kappa fraternity, Delta Theta Phi fraternity, Lambda Chi Alpha fraternity, Veterans of Foreign Wars and many others. The Sigurd Anderson airport in Webster, South Dakota is named in his honor.

== See also ==
- List of United States governors born outside the United States

Party political offices
Preceded by George T. Mickelson	Republican nominee for Attorney General of South Dakota; 1946, 1948	Succeeded by Ralph A. Dunham
Preceded by George T. Mickelson	Republican nominee for Governor of South Dakota; 1950, 1952	Succeeded by Joe Foss
Legal offices
Preceded by George T. Mickelson	Attorney General of South Dakota; 1947–1951	Succeeded by Ralph A. Dunham
Political offices
Preceded by George T. Mickelson	Governor of South Dakota; 1951–1955	Succeeded by Joe Foss
