= South Dakota Attorney General =

Chief legal officer of the U.S. state of South Dakota

Attorney General of South Dakota
- Seal of South Dakota

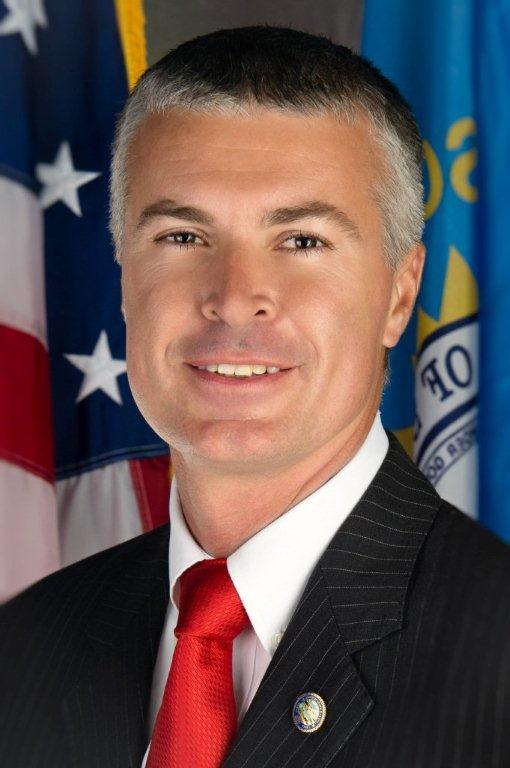
- Incumbent; Marty Jackley since January 3, 2023
- Style: The Honorable
- Term length: Four years, renewable once
- Formation: Constitution of South Dakota, 1889
- First holder: Robert Dollard
- Salary: $128,736.49
- Website: https://atg.sd.gov/

The attorney general of South Dakota is the state attorney general of the U.S. state of South Dakota. The attorney general is elected by popular vote to a four-year term and holds an executive position as the state's chief legal officer. In 1992, the voters approved a constitutional amendment to limit all constitutional officers and the governor to two consecutive four-year terms.

== Structure of the office ==
The South Dakota Attorney General's Office represents and provides legal advice to agencies, boards, and commissions of the government of South Dakota. The office represents the state in state and federal court, as well as in administrative adjudication and rulemaking hearings. The office handles felony criminal appeals, advises local prosecutors in the conduct of criminal trials and handles cases at the request of local prosecutors. In addition, the office issues formal opinions interpreting statutes for the agencies and political subdivisions of the state.

== History ==
Within South Dakota, the office of attorney general is often considered a stepping stone to the office of governor. Six attorneys general, Coe I. Crawford (won 1904 and 1906), Merrell Q. Sharpe (won 1942 and 1944; lost 1946), George Theodore Mickelson (won 1946 and 1948), Sigurd Anderson (won 1950 and 1952; lost 1964), Frank Farrar (won 1968; lost 1970) and Bill Janklow (won 1978, 1982, 1994 and 1998), have each been elected governor. Meanwhile, six others, Robert Dollard (lost 1892), Mark Barnett (lost 2002), Buell Jones (lost 1928), Leo Temmey (lost 1942), Phil Saunders (lost 1958), and Marty Jackley (lost 2018), have run for governor unsuccessfully. Attorneys general and former attorneys general have a record of 13 wins and 9 losses in running for governor. A graduate of the University of South Dakota School of Law had held the office of attorney general from 1959 until 2022. South Dakota has the second longest streak of Republican attorneys general in the country, dating back to 1975 (Nebraska has had Republican attorneys general since 1951).

== List of attorneys general ==
Parties

Democratic (4) Republican (27) Populist (1)

No.	Picture	Name (Birth-Death)	Term of Office	Political Party	Law school
1		Robert Dollard (1842-1912)	1889–1893	Republican	Read law
2		Coe I. Crawford (1858-1944)	1893–1897	Republican	University of Iowa
3		Melvin Grigsby (1845-1917)	1897–1899	Populist	Read law with William Pitt Dewey
4		John L. Pyle (1860-1902)	1899–1902	Republican	Read law under Manford E. Williams
5		Adolphus W. Burtt (1832-1917)	1902–1903	Republican	Read Law under Michael E. Crofoot
6	1903–1907	Philo Hall (1865-1938)	1903-1907	Republican	Read law under J. O. Andrews
7		S. Wesley Clark (1872-1949)	1907–1911	Republican	Read law under Thomas Sterling
8		Royal Johnson (1882-1939)	1911–1915	Republican	University of South Dakota
9		Clarence C. Caldwell (1877-1957)	1915–1919	Republican	University of Chicago (attended); University of South Dakota (graduated)
10		Byron S. Payne (1876-1949)	1919–1923	Republican	University of Minnesota
11		Buell F. Jones (1892-1947)	1923–1929	Republican	University of South Dakota
12		Merrell Q. Sharpe (1888-1962)	1929–1933	Republican	University of South Dakota
13		D. Walter Conway (1898-1956)	1933–1937	Democratic	Creighton University
14		Clair Roddewig (1902-1975)	1937–1939	Democratic	Creighton University
15		Leo A. Temmey (1894-1975)	1939–1943	Republican	University of Minnesota
16		George T. Mickelson (1903-1965)	1943–1947	Republican	University of South Dakota
17		Sigurd Anderson (1904-1990)	1947–1951	Republican	University of South Dakota
18		Ralph A. Dunham (1906-1959)	1951–1955	Republican	University of Iowa
19		Phil Saunders (1920-1997)	1955–1959	Republican	Northwestern University
20		Parnell J. Donahue (1916-1990)	1959–1961	Democratic	University of South Dakota
21		Albert C. Miller (1898-1979)	1961–1963	Republican	University of South Dakota
22		Frank Farrar (1929-2021)	1963–1969	Republican	University of South Dakota
23		Gordon Mydland (1922-2022)	1969–1973	Republican	University of South Dakota
24		Kermit A. Sande (b. 1943)	1973–1975	Democratic	University of South Dakota
25		Bill Janklow (1939-2012)	1975–1979	Republican	University of South Dakota
26		Mark V. Meierhenry (1944-2020)	1979–1987	Republican	University of South Dakota
27		Roger Tellinghuisen (b. 1953)	1987–1991	Republican	University of South Dakota
28		Mark Barnett (b.1954)	1991–2003	Republican	University of South Dakota
29		Larry Long (b. 1947)	2003–2009	Republican	University of South Dakota
30		Marty Jackley (b. 1970)	2009–2019	Republican	University of South Dakota
31		Jason Ravnsborg (b. 1976)	2019–2022	Republican	University of South Dakota
–		Charlie McGuigan	April 12, 2022 – June 28, 2022; Acting	Republican	University of Montana
32		Mark Vargo (b. 1963)	2022–2023	Republican	Georgetown University
33		Marty Jackley (b. 1970)	2023–Present	Republican	University of South Dakota

== Elections ==
The voters of the U.S. State of South Dakota elect an attorney general for a four-year term. The winning candidate is shown in bold.

Year	Democratic	Republican	Other Parties	Election Day
2022		Marty Jackley		Nov. 8,2022
2018	Randy Seiler 145,558	**Jason Ravnsborg** 179,071		Nov. 6,2018
2014		**Marty Jackley** 208,848	Chad Huber (Libertarian) 45,856	Nov. 4,2014
2010	Ron Volesky 100,182	**Marty Jackley** 202,499		Nov. 2,2010
2006	Ron Volesky: 104,267	**Larry Long** 207,079	Randy Ristesund (Libertarian) 8,904	Nov. 7, 2006
2002	Ron Volesky: 139,451	**Larry Long** 174,513	Bob Newland (Libertarian) 12,131	Nov. 2, 2002
1998		**Mark Barnett** 223,000		Nov. 3, 1998
1994	Randy Turner 106,709	**Mark Barnett** 192,147	Bert Olson (Libertarian) 9,410	Nov. 8, 1994
1990	Michael Butler 102,231	**Mark Barnett** 150,109		Nov. 6, 1990
1986	Jeff Masten 133,577	**Roger Tellinghuisen** 153,871		Nov. 4, 1986
1982	Rod Lefholz 119,697	**Mark V. Meierhenry** 153,728		Nov. 2, 1982
1978	Max Gors 106, 199	**Mark V. Meierhenry** 141,891		Nov. 7, 1978
1974	Kermit A. Sande 86,865	**William Janklow** 173,658		Nov. 5, 1974
1972	**Kermit A. Sande** 152,835	Ron Schmidt 143,367		Nov. 7, 1972
1970	Ramon Roubideaux 114,633	**Gordon Mydland** 116,493		Nov. 3, 1970
1968	James Abourezk 118,045	**Gordon Mydland** 148,366		Nov. 5, 1968
1966	Robert W. Swanson 79,670	**Frank Farrar** 141,734		Nov. 8, 1966
1964	William C. Grady 125,047	**Frank Farrar** 157,848		Nov. 3, 1964
1962	Thomas E. Poe 107,897	**Frank Farrar** 137,836		Nov. 6, 1962
1960	Parnell J. Donahue 138,320	**Albert C. Miller** 160,299		Nov. 8, 1960
1958	**Parnell J. Donahue** 126,225	George Wuest 122,332		Nov. 4, 1958
1956	William H. Heuermann 127,988	**Phil Saunders** 156,149		Nov. 6, 1956
1954	Fred J. Nichol 102,726	**Phil Saunders** 127,692		Nov. 2, 1954
1952	C.W. (Bill) Hyde 94,396	**Ralph A. Dunham** 187,888		Nov. 4, 1952
1950	George A. Bangs 97,792	**Ralph A. Dunham** 144,694		Nov. 7, 1950
1948	D.C. Walsh 99,724	**Sigurd Anderson** 137,370		Nov. 2, 1948
1946	Albert F. Ulmer 50,480	**Sigurd Anderson** 106,502		Nov. 5, 1946
1944	Fred E. Wheeler 83,441	**George T. Mickelson** 137,311		Nov. 7, 1944
1942	Lynn Fellows 62,527	**George T. Mickelson** 108,155		Nov. 3, 1942
1940	Andrew Foley 122,173	**Leo A. Temmey** 170,269		Nov. 7, 1940
1938	Clair Roddewig 123,671	**Leo A. Temmey** 144,125		Nov. 8, 1938
1936	**Clair Roddewig** 138,786	Sterling Clark 138,410		Nov. 3, 1936
1934	**D. Walter Conway** 158,553	Roy A. Nord 112,764		Nov. 6, 1934
1932	**D. Walter Conway** 135,393	Merrell Q. Sharpe 128,644		Nov. 8, 1932
1930	J.T. Grigsby 86,984	**Merrell Q. Sharpe** 101,961		Nov. 4, 1930
1928	Ray E. Doughtery 99,604	**Merrell Q. Sharpe**137,079	Lars J. Grinager (F.L.) 3,611	Nov. 6, 1928
1926	Charles F. Noonon 54, 194	**Buell F. Jones** 98,570	C.W.Kirschman (F.L.) 11,772	Nov. 2, 1926
1924	F.E. Flynn 39,278	**Buell F. Jones** 105,749	Thos L. Arnold (F.L.) 29,789	Nov. 4, 1924
1922	J.P. Alexander 38,125	**Buell F. Jones** 83,221	O.S. Hagen (N.P.) 36,337	Nov. 7, 1922
1920	Peter Ward 30,108	**Byron S. Payne** 104,417	O.M. Burch (N.P.) 43,891	Nov. 2, 1920
1918	Joseph J. Conry 19,712	**Byron S. Payne** 47,604	Seth Teesdale (Independent)	Nov. 5, 1918
1916	Joseph J. Conry 47,423	**Clarence C. Caldwell** 72,245	W.R. DeArment (Socialist) 3,620	Nov. 7, 1916
1914	L.W.Bicknell 33,705	**Clarence C. Caldwell** 54,129	M.J. Russell 1,403	Nov. 3, 1914
1912	W.A. Lynch 42,762	**Royal Johnson** 66,553		Nov. 5, 1912
1910	W.A. Lynch 30,533	**Royal Johnson** 66,085	Stacy A. Cochran (Independent) 1,656	Nov. 8, 1910
1908		**S. Wesley Clark** 68,605	John B. Hanten (Good Government) 19,613; S.H. Cranmer (Socialist) 2,906; Geo W Lattin (Scales of Justice) 141	Nov. 3, 1908
1906	Calvin J.B. Harris 19,942	**S. Wesley Clark** 48,287	S.H. Cranmer (Socialist) 2,372	Nov. 6, 1906
1904	Edmund W. Fiske 23,398	**Philo Hall** 69,529	S.H. Cranmer (Socialist) 2,866 T.H. Null (People's) 1,158	Nov. 8, 1904
1902	William A. Lynch 21,055	**Philo Hall** 48,425	S.H. Cranmer (Socialist) 2,636	Nov. 4, 1902
1900		**John L. Pyle** 53,909	Abner E. Hitchcock (Fusion) 40,057	Nov. 6, 1900
1898		**John L. Pyle** 38,701	C.S. Palmer (Fusion) 34,147	Nov. 8, 1898
1896		S.V.Jones 40,931	**Melvin Grigsby** (Populist) 41,316	Nov. 3, 1986
1894	S.W. Treesh 8,451	**Coe I. Crawford** 40,805	T.H. Null (Independent) 27,214	Nov. 4, 1894
1892	Henry C. Walsh 14,788	**Coe I. Crawford** 33,778	W.H. Curtis (Independent) 21,730	Nov. 8, 1892
1890	S.B. Van Buskirk 17,824	**Robert Dollard** 35,241	S.W. Cosand (Independent) 24,546	Nov. 4, 1890
1889	H.F. Fellows 22,632	**Robert Dollard** 55,364		Oct.1,1889

== See also ==
- United States Attorney for the District of South Dakota
- South Dakota Supreme Court
- University of South Dakota School of Law
- Attorney General of Minnesota
