= Harlan J. Bushfield =

American politician

Harlan John Bushfield
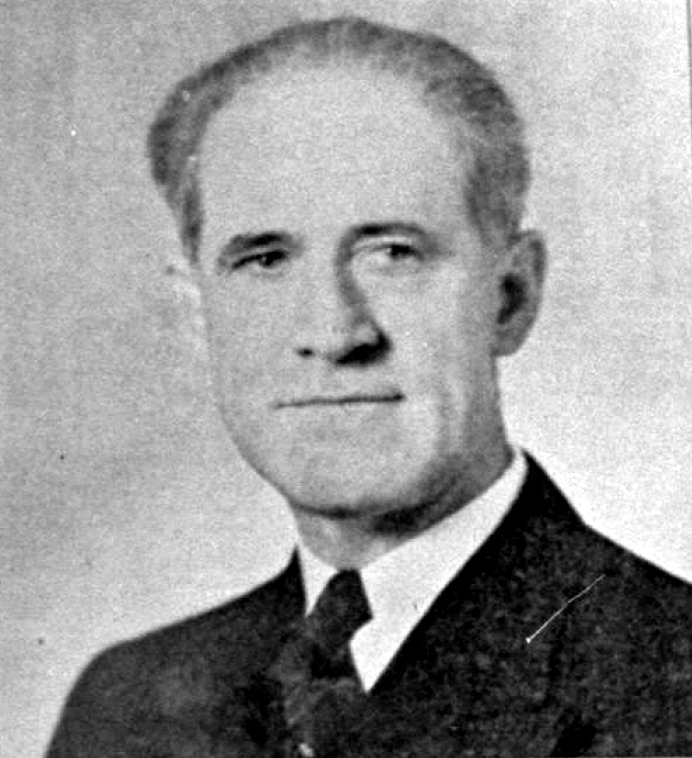
- Bushfield in 1942

United States Senator from South Dakota
- In office January 3, 1943 – September 27, 1948
- Preceded by: William J. Bulow
- Succeeded by: Vera C. Bushfield

16th Governor of South Dakota
- In office January 3, 1939 – January 5, 1943
- Preceded by: Leslie Jensen
- Succeeded by: Merrill Q. Sharpe

Chair of the South Dakota Republican Party
- In office October 25, 1935 – June 28, 1938
- Preceded by: Charles S. McDonald
- Succeeded by: Jesse D. Coon

Personal details
- Born: August 6, 1882 Atlantic, Iowa, U.S.
- Died: September 27, 1948 (aged 66) Miller, South Dakota, U.S.
- Party: Republican
- Spouse: Vera Cahalan (m. 1912)
- Children: 3
- Education: Dakota Wesleyan University; University of Minnesota Law School
- Occupation: Attorney

Harlan John Bushfield (August 6, 1882 – September 27, 1948) was an American politician from South Dakota. He served as the 16th governor of South Dakota and as a United States senator.

A native of Iowa, Bushfield was raised in Miller, South Dakota. He attended Dakota Wesleyan University, graduated from the University of Minnesota Law School, and became an attorney in Miller. A Republican, he served as State's Attorney of Hand County (1906–1910), and as Miller's city attorney. After unsuccessful campaigns for South Dakota Attorney General (1913, 1918), and the state Supreme Court (1930), Bushfield became chairman of the South Dakota Republican Party in 1935. He served until 1938, when he received the party's nomination for governor. Bushfield won the governorship in 1938, and was reelected in 1940. A fiscal conservative, his term as governor was concentrated on responding to the lingering effects of the Great Depression, which included reductions in the number of state employees and the state budget, as well as elimination or reduction of several state taxes.

In 1942, Bushfield won election to the United States Senate. As a senator, he supported U.S. participation in World War II and federal spending on programs of concern to South Dakota, including relief for farmers still recovering from the Depression. He also took isolationist positions on other issues, including creation of the United Nations and reciprocal trade agreements between the United States and other countries. Bushfield suffered a stroke in 1947, and decided not to run for reelection in 1948.

Bushfield's health did not improve after his stroke, and he died in Miller on September 27, 1948. He was buried in Miller, and temporarily succeeded in the Senate by his wife Vera.

== Early life ==
Bushfield was born in Atlantic, Iowa on August 6, 1882, the son of Cora E. (Pearson) Bushfield and newspaper publisher John A. Bushfield. He moved with his family to South Dakota in 1883, and attended the public schools in Miller, South Dakota. He attended Dakota Wesleyan University from 1899 to 1901, and graduated from the University of Minnesota Law School in 1904. He was admitted to the bar later that year and returned to Miller to practice.

== Career ==
In addition to practicing law, Bushfield served as State's Attorney of Hand County from 1906 to 1910, and was also Miller's City Attorney for several years. In addition, Bushfield was a member of Miller's school board, and served on his local Selective Service board during World War I. He made unsuccessful runs for South Dakota Attorney General in 1913 and 1918.

In 1923, Bushfield was chairman of the state Republican convention. In 1930, he announced his candidacy for a seat on the South Dakota Supreme Court, but withdrew before the primary election.

In late 1934, state Republican chairman Charles S. McDonald died in a car accident, and his duties were carried out by the party's executive committee until October 1935, when Bushfield was elected chairman. He served until June 1938, giving up the post after obtaining the Republican nomination for governor in the May primary.

== Governor ==
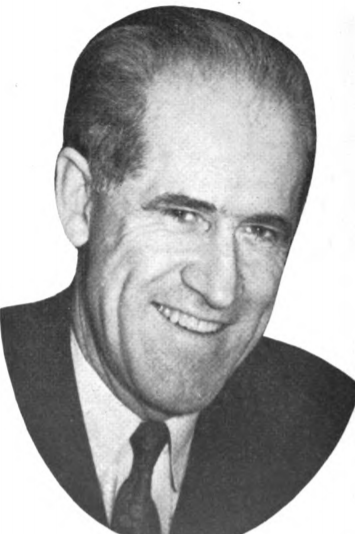
Bushfield as governor.

Bushfield was elected the 16th governor of South Dakota in 1938, and reelected in 1940. He has been called "one of the state's most conservative governors ever." As governor, Bushfield coped with the state financial crisis caused by the Great Depression with reductions to state employees and the state budget, as well as reductions to the state income tax and elimination of the state property tax.

== U.S. Senator ==
In 1942, Bushfield was the successful Republican nominee for a seat in the United States Senate, and he served from January 1943 until his death. Though he supported US involvement in World War II and relief for farmers still coping with the aftereffects of the Great Depression, he also advocated for several isolationist positions, including opposition to both reciprocal trade agreements and the founding of the United Nations.

== Death and burial ==
Bushfield suffered a stroke in 1947 and decided not to run for another term in 1948. Bushfield died from a cerebral hemorrhage in Miller on September 27, 1948, and was buried at the GAR Cemetery in Miller. In October, the governor appointed Bushfield's wife Vera to temporarily fill the Senate vacancy caused by his death. In November, Karl E. Mundt won the election for the term that started in January 1949. In December, Vera Bushfield resigned, enabling the governor to appoint Mundt to complete the final days of Harlan Bushfield's term. This appointment gave Mundt seniority over other senators elected in 1948, whose terms also started in January 1949.

== Family ==
In 1912, Bushfield married Vera Callahan. They were the parents of three children—Mary, John and Harlan Jr.

== See also ==
- List of members of the United States Congress who died in office (1900–1949)

Party political offices
Preceded by Leslie Jensen	Republican nominee for Governor of South Dakota; 1938, 1940	Succeeded by Merrell Q. Sharpe
Preceded by John Chandler Gurney	Republican nominee for U.S. Senator from South Dakota (Class 2); 1942	Succeeded by Karl E. Mundt
Political offices
Preceded by Leslie Jensen	Governor of South Dakota; 1939–1943	Succeeded by Merrell Q. Sharpe
U.S. Senate
Preceded by William J. Bulow	United States Senator (Class 2) from South Dakota; 1943–1948	Succeeded by Vera C. Bushfield
