= List of South Dakota state legislatures =

The legislature of the U.S. state of South Dakota has convened many times since statehood became effective on November 2, 1889.

== Legislatures ==
| Number | Name | Start date | End date | Last election |
|---|---|---|---|---|
| 1 | 1st South Dakota Legislature | October 15, 1889 | March 7, 1890 | 1 October 1889 |
| 2 | | | 1891 | |
| 3 | | | 1893 | |
| 4 | | | 1895 | |
| 5 | | | 1897 | |
| 6 | 6th South Dakota Legislature | January 3, 1899 | March 3, 1899 | |
| 7 | | | 1901 | |
| 8 | | | 1903 | |
| 9 | | | 1905 | |
| 10 | | | 1907 | |
| 11 | | | 1909 | |
| 12 | | | 1911 | |
| 13 | | | 1913 | |
| 14 | | | 1915 | |
| 15 | | | 1917 | |
| 16 | | | 1919 | |
| 17 | | | 1921 | |
| 18 | | | 1923 | |
| 19 | | | 1925 | |
| 20 | | | 1927 | |
| 21 | | | 1929 | |
| 22 | | | 1931 | |
| 23 | | | 1933 | |
| 24 | | | 1935 | |
| 25 | | | 1937 | |
| 26 | | | 1939 | |
| 27 | | | 1941 | |
| 28 | | | 1943 | |
| 29 | | | 1945 | |
| 30 | | | 1947 | |
| 31 | | | 1949 | |
| 32 | | | 1951 | |
| 33 | | | 1953 | |
| 34 | | | 1955 | |
| 35 | | | 1957 | |
| 36 | | | 1959 | |
| 37 | | | 1961 | |
| 38 | | | 1963 | |
| 39 | | | 1964 | |
| 40 | | | 1965 | |
| 41 | | | 1966 | |
| 42 | | | 1967 | |
| 43 | | | 1968 | |
| 44 | | | 1969 | |
| 45 | | | 1970 | |
| 46 | | | 1971 | November 3, 1970 |
| 47 | | | 1972 | |
| 48 | | | 1973 | November 7, 1972 |
| 49 | | | 1974 | |
| 50 | | | 1975 | |
| 51 | | | 1976 | |
| 52 | | | 1977 | |
| 53 | | | 1978 | |
| 54 | | | 1979 | |
| 55 | | | 1980 | |
| 56 | | | 1981 | |
| 57 | | | 1982 | |
| 58 | | | 1983 | |
| 59 | | | 1984 | |
| 60 | | | 1985 | |
| 61 | | | 1986 | |
| 62 | | | 1987 | |
| 63 | | | 1988 | |
| 64 | | | 1989 | |
| 65 | | | 1990 | |
| 66 | | | 1991 | |
| 67 | | | 1992 | |
| 68 | | | 1993 | |
| 69 | | | 1994 | |
| 70 | | | 1995 | |
| 71 | | | 1996 | |
| 72 | | | 1997 | |
| 73 | | | 1998 | |
| 74 | | | 1999 | |
| 75 | | | 2000 | |
| 76 | | | 2001 | |
| 77 | | | 2002 | |
| 78 | | | 2003 | |
| 79 | | | 2004 | |
| 80 | | | 2005 | |
| 81 | | | 2006 | |
| 82 | | | 2007 | |
| 83 | | | 2008 | |
| 84 | | | 2009 | |
| 85 | | | 2010 | |
| 86 | | | 2011 | |
| 87 | | | 2012 | |
| 88 | | | 2013 | |
| 89 | | | 2014 | |
| 90 | | | 2015 | |
| 91 | | | 2016 | |
| 92 | | | 2017 | |
| 93 | | | 2018 | |
| 94 | | | 2019 | |
| 95 | | | 2020 | |
| 96 | | | 2021 | November 2020: House, Senate |
| 97 | | | 2022 | |
| 98 | 98th South Dakota Legislature | | 2023 | November 2022: House, Senate |
| 99 | 99th South Dakota Legislature | January 9, 2024 | March 26, 2024 | |
| 100 | 100th South Dakota Legislature | January 14, 2025 | March 31, 2025 | November 5, 2024: House, Senate |

== See also ==
- List of speakers of the South Dakota House of Representatives
- List of governors of South Dakota
- Constitution of South Dakota
- Politics of South Dakota
- Elections in South Dakota
- South Dakota State Capitol
- Timeline of South Dakota
- Lists of United States state legislative sessions
