= 1974 South Dakota Attorney General election =

- November 5, 1974
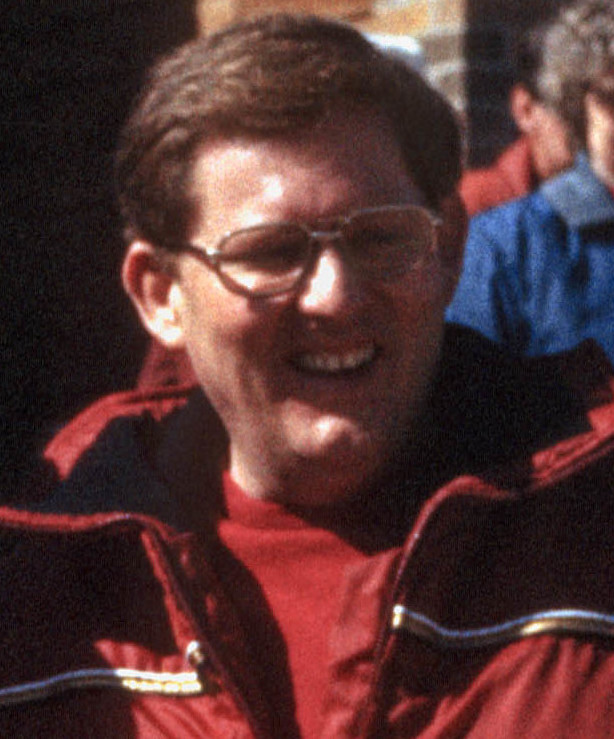

Nominee	Bill Janklow	Kermit A. Sande
Party	Republican	Democratic
Popular vote	173,658	86,865
Percentage	66.66%	33.34%
- County results Janklow: 50–60% 60–70% 70–80% 80–90%
Attorney General before election
Kermit A. Sande
Democratic
Elected Attorney General
Bill Janklow
Republican

The 1974 South Dakota Attorney General election was held on November 5, 1974, to elect the Attorney General of South Dakota. Democratic incumbent Kermit A. Sande ran for a second term but lost in a blowout to Republican South Dakota Assistant Attorney General Bill Janklow, who won a two-thirds majority of the vote. Janklow's victory came despite renewed allegations of rape from Native American woman Jancita Eagle Deer.

== General election ==
=== Candidates ===
- Bill Janklow, Assistant South Dakota Attorney General (1973–1975) (Republican)
- Kermit A. Sande, incumbent South Dakota Attorney General (1973–1975) (Democratic)

=== Results ===
1974 South Dakota Attorney General election results
Party	Candidate	Votes	%	±%
Republican	Bill Janklow	173,658	66.66%	+18.26%
Democratic	Kermit A. Sande	86,865	33.34%	−18.26%
Total votes		260,523	100.00%	
Republican gain from Democratic				
