= James Abourezk =

American attorney and politician (1931–2023)

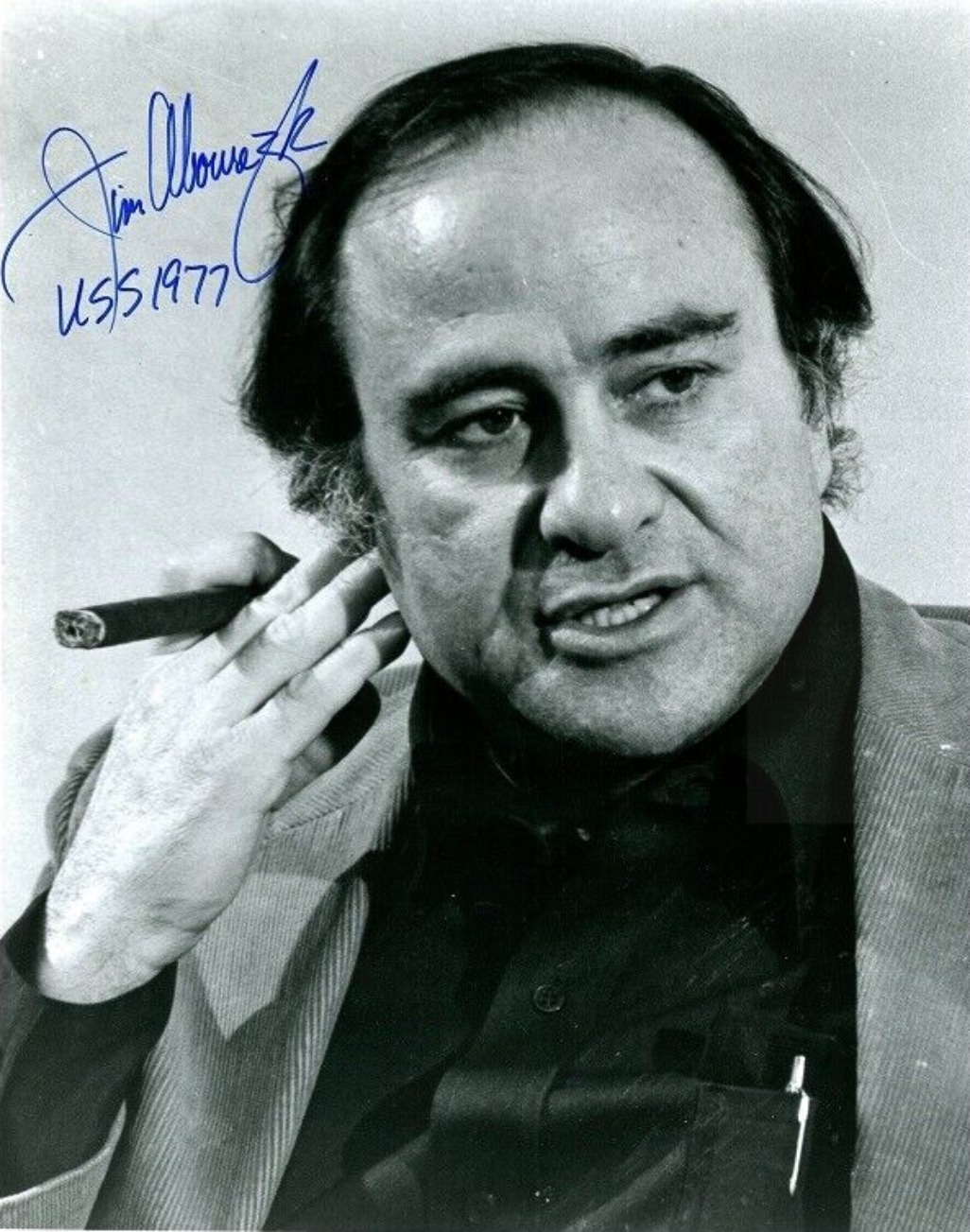
- Abourezk in 1977

Chair of the Senate Indian Affairs Committee
- In office January 3, 1977 – January 3, 1979
- Preceded by: Joseph C. O'Mahoney (1947)
- Succeeded by: John Melcher

United States Senator from South Dakota
- In office January 3, 1973 – January 3, 1979
- Preceded by: Karl Mundt
- Succeeded by: Larry Pressler

Member of the U.S. House of Representatives from South Dakota's 2nd district
- In office January 3, 1971 – January 3, 1973
- Preceded by: E. Y. Berry
- Succeeded by: James Abdnor

Personal details
- Born: James George Abourezk; February 24, 1931 Wood, South Dakota, U.S.
- Died: February 24, 2023 (aged 92) Sioux Falls, South Dakota, U.S.
- Party: Democratic
- Spouse(s): Mary Ann Houlton (m. 1952; div. 1981) Margaret Bethea (m. 1982, divorced) Sanaa Dieb (m. 1991)
- Children: 3
- Education: South Dakota School of Mines and Technology (BS); University of South Dakota (JD)

Military service
- Branch/service: United States Navy
- Years of service: 1948–1952
- Battles/wars: Korean War

James George Abourezk (/ˈæbərɛsk/ AB-ur-esk; February 24, 1931 – February 24, 2023) was an American attorney and politician from South Dakota. A member of the Democratic Party, he served in both chambers of the United States Congress for one term each, and was the first Arab to serve in the U.S. Senate. After he left Congress, he founded the American-Arab Anti-Discrimination Committee (ADC) in 1980 with the goal of counteracting anti-Arab racism in the country.

Abourezk served in the United States Navy during the Korean War. He represented South Dakota in the U.S. House of Representatives from 1971 to 1973 and in the U.S. Senate from 1973 to 1979. He was the primary author of the Indian Child Welfare Act, which was passed by the U.S. Congress in 1978 to help preserve the families and culture of Native Americans. As a federal law, the Indian Child Welfare Act gives Native tribal governments exclusive jurisdiction over children who reside on or are domiciled on an Indian reservation; and it gives them concurrent, but presumptive jurisdiction over foster care placement proceedings for children who do not live on a Native reservation. The year prior, Abourezk successfully introduced the American Indian Religious Freedom Act in the Senate.

Abourezk was a critic of United States foreign policy in the Middle East, particularly with regard to the Arab–Israeli conflict. Under his leadership, the ADC became especially active following the Iraqi invasion of Kuwait and the subsequent Gulf War, during which he became concerned about the rising rate of targeted hate crimes against Arabs and also against people mistaken for Arabs.

== Early life and education ==
James George Abourezk was born in Wood, South Dakota, to a family of Lebanese Greek Orthodox Christians. He was one of five children and both of his parents were immigrants from Lebanon: his mother Lena Abourezk (née Mickel) was a homemaker, and his father Charles Abourezk was an owner of two general stores. Growing up on the Rosebud Indian Reservation, he spoke only Arabic at home and did not learn English until he went to elementary school. At the age of 16, he was expelled from school for playing a prank on a teacher and left home to live with his brother Tom. He completed high school in 1948.

Between 1948 and 1952, Abourezk served in the United States Navy before and during the Korean War. Following 12 weeks of boot camp, he enrolled in Electricians' Mates School, after which he was sent to support Navy ships stationed in Japan.

Following military service, Abourezk worked on a ranch, in a casino, and as a judo instructor. For a time, he ran the Gay Lady (later known as the Gaslight) Bar in Rockerville, South Dakota, where he employed future governor Bill Janklow as a bartender, and where future American Indian Movement activist Russell Means and his brother Ted also worked.

Abourezk earned a degree in civil engineering from the South Dakota School of Mines and Technology in Rapid City, South Dakota in 1961, and worked as a civil engineer in California before returning to South Dakota to work on the Minuteman silos being built as part of the new 44th Strategic Missile Wing at Ellsworth Air Force Base. At the age of 32, he decided to pursue law, and earned a Juris Doctor degree from University of South Dakota School of Law in Vermillion, South Dakota, in 1966.

== Political career ==
Abourezk began a legal practice in Rapid City, South Dakota, and joined the Democratic Party. He ran in 1968 for Attorney General of South Dakota but was defeated by Gordon Mydland. In 1970, he was elected to the United States House of Representatives from South Dakota's 2nd Congressional district, which would later be eliminated following the 1980 census.

In 1972, Abourezk was elected to the U.S. Senate, where he served from 1973 to 1979, after which he chose not to seek a second term. He was the first chair of the Senate Committee on Indian Affairs. In 1974, Time magazine named Senator Abourezk as one of the "200 Faces for the Future".

=== Legislation ===
His legislative successes in the Senate included the 1975 Indian Self-Determination and Education Assistance Act and the American Indian Religious Freedom Act.

His signature legislation was the Indian Child Welfare Act (ICWA, 1978), designed to protect Native American children and families from being torn apart. Native American children have been removed by state social agencies from their families and placed in foster care or adoption at a disproportionately high rate, and usually placed with non-Native American families. This both deprived the children of their culture and threatened the very survival of the tribes. This legislation was intended to provide a federal standard that emphasized the needs of Native American children to be raised in their own cultures, and gave precedence to tribal courts for decisions about children domiciled on the reservation, as well as concurrent but presumptive jurisdiction with state courts for Native American children off the reservation. He also authored and passed the Indian Self-Determination and Education Assistance Act of 1975, which provided Indian tribes with greater autonomy. The BIA made grants to the tribes but they could manage contracts and funds to control their own destiny. That legislation also reduced the direct influence of the Bureau of Indian Affairs on the tribes.

As a senator, Abourezk condemned the Office of Public Safety (OPS), a Cold War-era program within the United States Agency for International Development (USAID), which provided training to foreign police forces and was prone to human rights abuses. Abourezk introduced legislation that resulted in the banning of overseas police assistance in 1974, and the closure of the OPS in 1975.

=== Other initiatives ===
After taking office, Abourezk was approached almost daily by representatives of various sides of the conflict in the Middle East. In 1973, Abourezk was invited by the Lebanese embassy to visit Beirut. Later that year, he met with Arab leaders to discuss a possible peace settlement, and attempted to negotiate a truce contingent on Israel's return of the Old City of Jerusalem, the West Bank, and the Gaza Strip, which was rejected by Israel. In 1976, Abourezk voted against the rest of the Senate on a measure to stop foreign aid to countries harboring international terrorists, arguing that there was no provision for terrorist acts committed by the Israeli military.

In 1973, Senators Abourezk and George McGovern attempted to end the Wounded Knee Occupation by negotiating with American Indian Movement leaders, who were in a standoff with federal law enforcement after demanding that the federal government honor its historical treaties with the Oglala Sioux nation. The summer after the occupation, Abourezk introduced the American Indian Policy Review Commission Act, which created the eleven-member commission, and served as its chairman until its landmark report was published in 1977. He took the gavel as chairman of the Select Committee on Indian Affairs from its creation in 1977 to 1979, when he left the Senate.

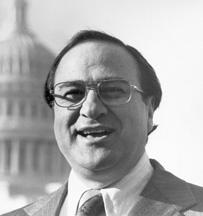
James Abourezk in the 1970s

In 1976, Abourezk ordered the General Accounting Office carry out an investigation after doctor and lawyer Connie Redbird Pinkerman-Uri published a report suggesting that up to a quarter of Native American women had been involuntarily sterilised.

Abourezk was an early champion of more direct democracy through a National initiative process, similar to the state initiative process adopted by South Dakota in 1898. In July 1977, he co-sponsored a proposal for a constitutional amendment that would allow federal laws to be enacted through popular vote, together with fellow Senator Mark Hatfield (R-OR). Under the Abourezk resolution, voters could put legislation on the national election ballot if they secured signatures from three percent of voters in the previous presidential election. His efforts received national media coverage, and Abourezk chaired hearings and testified that the proposal was based on "belief in the wisdom of the American people". Although the national initiative movement gained additional cosponsors in both the House and Senate in 1978, no further action was taken during the 95th Congress, after which interest waned.

In 1977, Senators Abourezk and McGovern went to Cuba with a group of basketball players from the University of South Dakota and South Dakota State who played against the Cuban national men's basketball team.

In 1978, Abourezk chose not to run for re-election. He was succeeded in office by Republican Larry Pressler, with whom he had a long-running political feud.

=== Advocacy ===
External videos
- Booknotes interview with Abourezk on Advise and Dissent, March 25, 1990, C-SPAN

After leaving the Senate, Abourezk served as legal counsel for the Islamic Republic of Iran in Washington, D.C., leading The New York Times to call him "Iran's Man in Washington". He defended the Islamic Republic in lawsuits seeking payment for contracts entered into by the former Shah's government, and sought to recoup Iranian assets that were allegedly taken by Mohammad Reza Pahlavi and his wife.

In Abourezk v. Reagan (1987), Abourezk and other U.S. citizens sued the State Department for denying visas to foreign guest speakers, challenging the executive branch's authority to exclude individuals for ideological reasons. Abouzek was represented by Leonard Boudin who had argued Kleindienst v. Mandel before the Supreme Court. The case was heard by then-Judge Ruth Bader Ginsburg who ruled in favor of Abourezk.

As a senator, Abourezk was outraged by the 1967 USS Liberty incident and publicly condemned about the circumstances of the attack:

"The shame of the U.S.S. Liberty incident is that our sailors were treated as though they were enemies, rather than the patriots and heroes that they were. There is no other incident beyond Israeli attack on the U.S.S. Liberty – that shows the power of the Israeli Lobby by being able to silence successive American governments. Allowing the lies told by the Israelis and their minions in the U.S. is disheartening to all of us who are proud of our servicemen."

In 1980, Abourezk cofounded the American-Arab Anti-Discrimination Committee, a grassroots civil rights organization. In 1989, he published his Advise and Dissent: Memoirs of South Dakota and the U.S. Senate (ISBN 1-55652-066-2). He was the co-author, along with American Jewish Committee, of Through Different Eyes: Two Leading Americans — a Jew and an Arab — Debate U. S. Policy in the Middle East (1987), (ISBN 0917561392).

In 2003, Abourezk, represented by Charles Abourezk, sued the website Probush.com for defamation. He was later joined by Jane Fonda and Roxanne Dunbar-Ortiz as plaintiffs, and settled the lawsuit with the Internet site in 2005.

In 2007, Abourezk gave an interview to the Hezbollah funded news channel Al-Manar. In this interview Abourezk said that he believed that Zionists used the terrorists that perpetrated the 9/11 terrorist attacks as a way to sow Islamophobia, that Zionists control the United States Congress, and that Hezbollah and Hamas are resistance fighters. He continued to criticize Israel in 2014, writing that "ending the occupation... would end the rockets fired by Hamas."

After his retirement from the Senate, Abourezk worked as a lawyer and writer in Sioux Falls, South Dakota. He continued to be active in supporting tribal sovereignty and culture. In July 2015 he spoke out against a suit filed against the ICWA by the Goldwater Institute; it was one of three suits seeking to overturn the act. Some states and adoption groups, who make money off adoptions, have opposed any prohibitions on their placements of Native American children. Abourezk considered this his signature legislation and the new rules instrumental in protecting Native American children and preserving tribal families. He noted that the late Senator Barry Goldwater, his friend and colleague, had voted for the legislation in 1977 and had often consulted with him in tribal matters.

HuffPost writer James Zogby in 2014 praised Abourezk as a "bold and courageous former Senator" for protesting to the Federal Bureau of Investigation after the Abscam operation.

=== Death ===
He died at home in Sioux Falls on February 24, 2023, on his 92nd birthday. His funeral was held on Sunday, May 28, 2023, at the Washington Pavilion of Arts and Science in downtown Sioux Falls.

== Personal life ==
Abourezk was married three times. His first marriage was to Mary Ann Houlton in 1952, which ended in divorce in 1981. They had three children. He subsequently married and divorced Margaret Bethea, before marrying Sanaa Dieb in 1991, with the couple remaining together until his death.

Abourezk was a Greek Orthodox Christian. He lived in South Dakota for most of his life.

== See also ==
- List of Arab and Middle Eastern Americans in the United States Congress

U.S. House of Representatives
Preceded by E. Y. Berry	Member of the U.S. House of Representatives from South Dakota's 2nd congressional district 1971–1973	Succeeded by James Abdnor
Party political offices
Preceded by Donn Wright	Democratic nominee for U.S. Senator from South Dakota (Class 2); 1972	Succeeded by Don Barrett
U.S. Senate
Preceded by Karl Mundt	U.S. Senator (Class 2) from South Dakota; 1973–1979; Served alongside: George McGovern	Succeeded by Larry Pressler
Vacant Title last held by Joseph C. O'Mahoney; 1947	Chair of the Senate Indian Affairs Committee; 1977–1979	Succeeded by John Melcher
