= 1968 South Dakota gubernatorial election =

- November 5, 1968
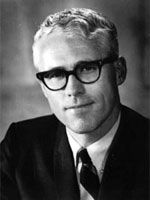

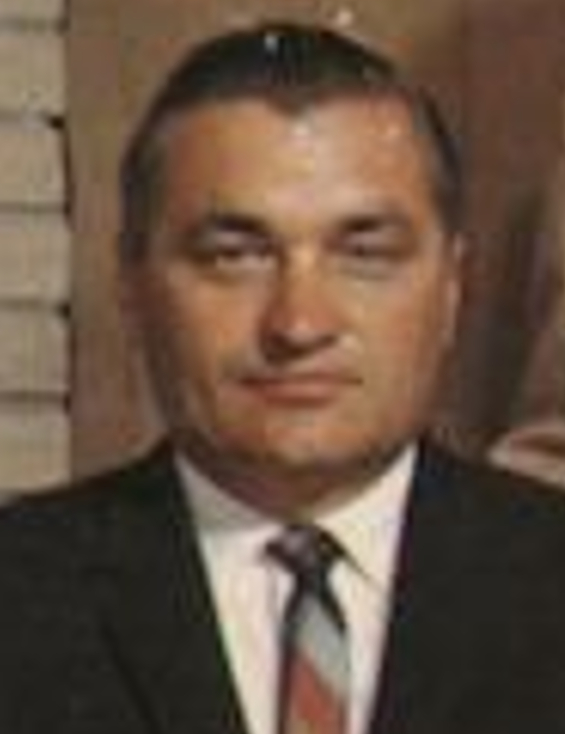
Nominee	Frank Farrar	Robert Chamberlin
Party	Republican	Democratic
Popular vote	159,646	117,260
Percentage	57.65%	42.35%
- County results Farrar: 50–60% 60–70% 70–80% 80–90% Chamberlin: 50–60% 60–70%
Governor before election
Nils Boe
Republican
Elected Governor
Frank Farrar
Republican

The 1968 South Dakota gubernatorial election was held on November 5, 1968.

Incumbent Republican Governor Nils Boe did not stand for re-election.

Republican nominee Frank Farrar defeated Democratic nominee Robert Chamberlin with 57.65% of the vote.

== Primary elections ==
Primary elections were held on June 4, 1968.

=== Democratic primary ===
==== Candidates ====
- Robert Chamberlin, former State Representative and Democratic candidate for Governor in 1966

==== Results ====
Democratic primary results
Party	Candidate	Votes	%
Democratic	Robert Chamberlin		unopposed

=== Republican primary ===
==== Candidates ====
- Frank Farrar, Attorney General of South Dakota

==== Results ====
Republican primary results
Party	Candidate	Votes	%
Republican	Frank Farrar		unopposed

== General election ==
=== Candidates ===
- Robert Chamberlin, Democratic
- Frank Farrar, Republican

=== Results ===
1968 South Dakota gubernatorial election
Party	Candidate	Votes	%	±%
Republican	Frank Farrar	159,646	57.65%	
Democratic	Robert Chamberlin	117,260	42.35%	
Majority		42,386	15.30%	
Turnout		276,906	100.00%	
Republican hold		Swing		

== Bibliography ==
- Gubernatorial Elections, 1787-1997. Washington, D.C.: Congressional Quarterly Inc. 1998. ISBN 1-56802-396-0.
- Scammon, Richard M., ed. (1970). America Votes 8: a handbook of contemporary American election statistics, 1968. Washington, D.C.: Governmental Affairs Institute.
