= 1972 United States Senate election in South Dakota =

- November 7, 1972
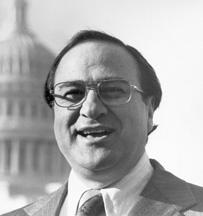

Nominee	James Abourezk	Robert W. Hirsch
Party	Democratic	Republican
Popular vote	174,773	131,613
Percentage	57.04%	42.96%
- County results Abourezk: 50–60% 60–70% 80–90% Hirsch: 50–60% 70–80%
U.S. senator before election
Karl E. Mundt
Republican
Elected U.S. Senator
James Abourezk
Democratic

The 1972 United States Senate election in South Dakota took place on November 7, 1972, concurrently with the U.S. presidential election, other elections to the United States Senate in other states, elections to the United States House of Representatives, and various state and local elections.

Incumbent Republican U.S. Senator Karl E. Mundt, who had suffered a severe stroke in 1969, did not run for re-election to a fifth term, and was succeeded by Democratic nominee James Abourezk.

Despite Abourezk's 14 percentage point win, Democratic presidential nominee and future fellow South Dakota Senator George McGovern lost his home state by a margin of 8.6 points in the concurrent presidential election.

South Dakota was one of fifteen states, alongside Alabama, Arkansas, Colorado, Delaware, Georgia, Iowa, Louisiana, Maine, Minnesota, Mississippi, Montana, New Hampshire, Rhode Island and West Virginia, that were won by Republican President Richard Nixon in 1972 that elected Democrats to the United States Senate.

== Primary elections ==
Primary elections were held on June 6, 1972.

=== Democratic primary ===
==== Candidates ====
- James Abourezk, incumbent U.S. representative for South Dakota's 2nd congressional district
- George Blue, former state senator and unsuccessful candidate for Democratic nomination for lieutenant governor of South Dakota in 1968

==== Results ====
Democratic primary results
Party	Candidate	Votes	%
Democratic	James Abourezk	46,931	79.42%
Democratic	George Blue	12,163	20.58%
Total votes		59,094	100.00%

=== Republican primary ===
==== Candidates ====
- Robert W. Hirsch, former South Dakota Senate majority leader
- Chuck Lien, businessman
- Gordon J. Mydland, incumbent attorney general of South Dakota
- Tom Reardon, banker
- Kenneth D. Stofferahn, farmer

==== Results ====
Republican primary results
Party	Candidate	Votes	%
Republican	Robert W. Hirsch	27,322	27.37%
Republican	Gordon J. Mydland	22,297	22.34%
Republican	Chuck Lien	21,995	22.03%
Republican	Kenneth D. Stofferahn	16,615	16.65%
Republican	Tom Reardon	11,592	11.61%
Total votes		99,821	100.00%

A state convention was held on June 26 to determine the party's nominee, as no candidate received the 35% required for nomination under the state's primary law. Hirsch was nominated at this convention.

== General election ==
=== Candidates ===
- James Abourezk (D)
- Robert W. Hirsch (R)

=== Results ===
1972 United States Senate election in South Dakota
Party	Candidate	Votes	%
Democratic	James Abourezk	174,773	57.04
Republican	Robert W. Hirsch	131,613	42.96
Majority		43,160	14.08
Turnout		306,386	
Democratic gain from Republican			

== See also ==
- 1972 United States Senate elections

== Bibliography ==
- Congressional Elections, 1946-1996. Washington, D.C.: Congressional Quarterly Inc. 1998. ISBN 1-56802-248-4.
- Scammon, Richard M., ed. (1973). America Votes 10: a handbook of contemporary American election statistics, 1972. Washington, D.C.: Governmental Affairs Institute.
