= 1972 South Dakota gubernatorial election =

- November 7, 1972
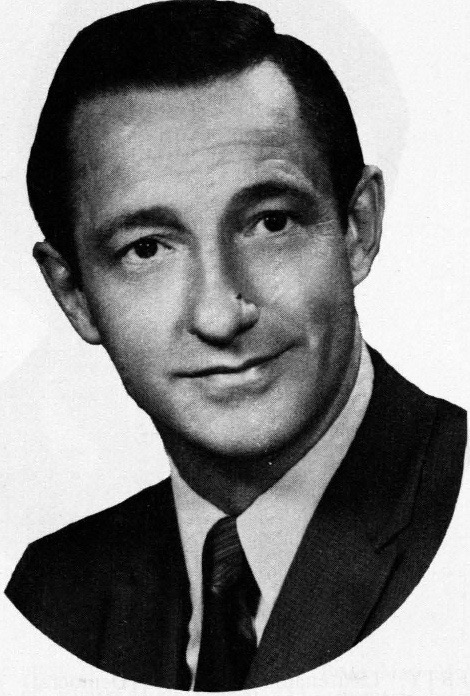

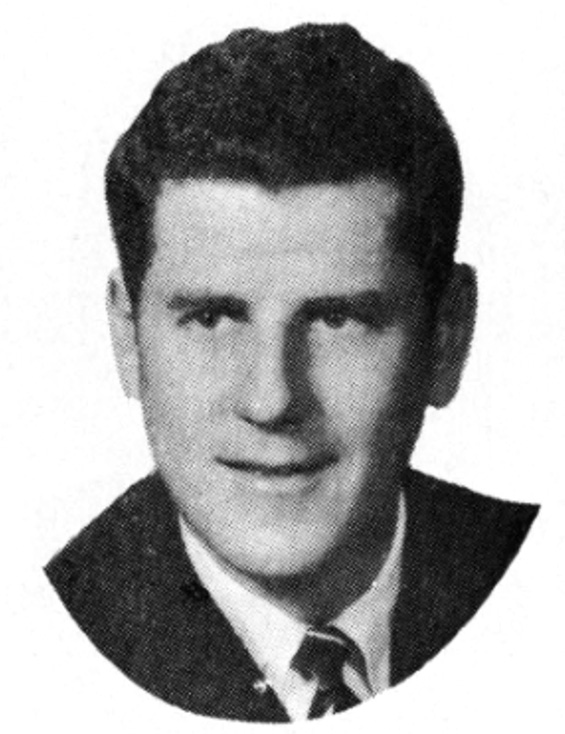
Nominee	Richard F. Kneip	Carveth Thompson
Party	Democratic	Republican
Running mate	Bill Dougherty
Popular vote	185,012	123,165
Percentage	60.03%	39.97%
- County results Kneip: 50–60% 60–70% 70–80% Thompson: 50–60% 60–70%
Governor before election
Richard F. Kneip
Democratic
Elected Governor
Richard F. Kneip
Democratic

The 1972 South Dakota gubernatorial election was held on November 7, 1972, to elect a governor of South Dakota. It was the last election in South Dakota to elect the governor for a two-year term after a 1972 state constitutional amendment established a four-year term. Democratic nominee Richard F. Kneip was re-elected, defeating Republican nominee Carveth Thompson despite incumbent Republican President Richard Nixon winning the state with 54% of the vote on the same ballot.

== Democratic primary ==
=== Candidates ===
- Richard F. Kneip, incumbent governor of South Dakota

== Republican primary ==
=== Candidates ===
- Simon W. Chance
- Carveth Thompson, member of the South Dakota House of Representatives

=== Results ===
Republican primary results
Party	Candidate	Votes	%
Republican	Carveth Thompson	65,538	72.41
Republican	Simon W. Chance	24,975	27.59
Total votes		90,513	100.00

== General election ==
=== Results ===
South Dakota gubernatorial election, 1972
Party	Candidate	Votes	%
Democratic	Richard F. Kneip (inc.)	185,012	60.03
Republican	Carveth Thompson	123,165	39.97
Total votes		308,177	100.00
Majority		61,847	20.06
Democratic hold			
