= Frank Farrar =

American politician; 24th governor of South Dakota

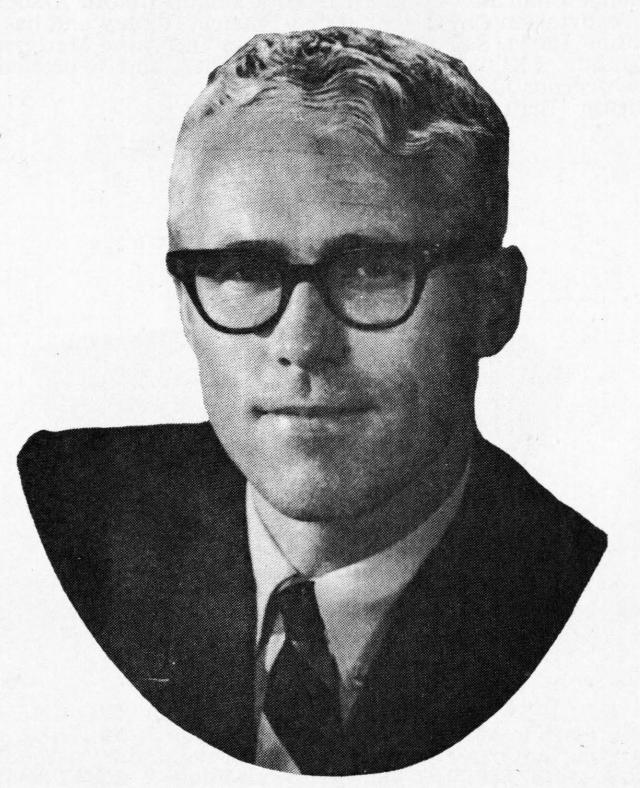

24th Governor of South Dakota
- In office January 7, 1969 – January 5, 1971
- Lieutenant: James Abdnor
- Preceded by: Nils Boe
- Succeeded by: Richard F. Kneip

22nd Attorney General of South Dakota
- In office January 1963 – January 7, 1969
- Governor: Archie M. Gubbrud; Nils Boe
- Preceded by: Albert C. Miller
- Succeeded by: Gordon Mydland

Personal details
- Born: Frank Leroy Farrar; April 2, 1929 Britton, South Dakota, U.S.
- Died: October 31, 2021 (aged 92) Rochester, Minnesota, U.S.
- Party: Republican
- Spouse: Patricia Henley (m. 1953; died 2015)
- Children: 5
- Education: University of South Dakota (BS, LLB)

Frank Leroy Farrar (April 2, 1929 – October 31, 2021) was an American politician who was the 24th Governor of South Dakota. A Republican from Britton, he served as the state's attorney general from 1963 to 1969, and as governor from 1969 to 1971. After leaving office, he chaired several holding companies and became the owner of numerous banks.

== Early life and education ==
Farrar was born in Britton, South Dakota, the son of Venetia Soule (Taylor) and Virgil W. Farrar. He was an Eagle Scout, student body president and graduated from the local high school in Britton in 1947. He earned a B.S. from the University of South Dakota (USD) an LL.B. degree from the USD School of Law. He joined the Reserve Officers' Training Corps as a student at USD, and was in the U.S. Army Reserve from 1949 through 1953, and on active duty during the Korean War from 1953 to 1955. He attained the rank of captain by the time he retired from the Army Reserve. He married Patricia Henley on June 5, 1953, in Fort Benning, Georgia, where he was stationed in the U.S. Army. Frank and Patricia Farrar raised five children, Jeanne, Sally, Robert, Mary, and Anne.

== Career ==
After the Korean War ended, Farrar was an Internal Revenue Service Agent until 1957. He was a judge in 1958. Farrar served as State's Attorney for Marshall County from 1959 to 1962. He also served as President of the States Attorneys Association.

On May 22, 1962, Farrar announced that he was running for Attorney General of South Dakota. Sterling Clark, of Belle Fourche, also ran for the Republican nomination for Attorney General. Farrar won the nomination with 96,608 1/2 votes to 57,339 1/2 votes for Clark. Farrar went on to defeat Democrat Thomas E. Poe of Vermillion, South Dakota, in the general election. Poe had replaced Democrat William Day of Winner, South Dakota, who resigned his candidacy for business reasons. At 33 years old at the time, he was the youngest person in the history of South Dakota to be elected as the state's attorney general.

On July 1, 1964, Farrar sought re-nomination as attorney general. He was re-elected with 157,848 votes, defeating Democrat William C. Grady, who received 125,047. In the 1966 general election, Farrar ran against Democrat Robert M. Swanson, and won a third term with 141,734 votes to 79,670 for Swanson. With Farrar's election to a third term, there was much speculation that he would be the heir apparent for Republican Gubernatorial nomination in 1968. In his three two-year terms as the state's attorney general, he focused on crackdowns on drug users and dealers, and much efforts were put into the enforcement of insurance, banking and securities laws.

With his success and popularity through the years as South Dakota's attorney general, Farrar garnered more than 57% of the vote to defeat the Democratic candidate Robert Chamberlin in the 1968 gubernatorial election. As governor, he continued his work on reducing drug-related crimes, improving consumer protection and modernizing the state’s regulatory authority over the banking and insurance industries. However, he lost much support when he raised the state sales tax from 3% to 4% and promoted unpopular reforms in the energy sector, which led to him being defeated when running for reelection 2 years later. That was “the only election I lost in my life,” he later remarked in a 2014 interview. As of 2021, this was the last time for an elected, sitting governor of South Dakota to lose re-election.

In 1969, Farrar commuted the sentence of the state's only death row inmate, Thomas White Hawk. On March 24, 1967, White Hawk, an 18-year-old premed student at the University of South Dakota, a friend, William Stands, went to the home of 63-year-old jeweler, James Yeado. White Hawk said he planned to rob Yeado, but killed him instead, after which Stands fled. White Hawk then tied up Yeado's wife and raped her twice. In 1968, he pleaded guilty to first degree murder and was sentenced to death, becoming the first person to be sentenced to death in the state since George Sitts in 1946. The crime drew national attention after NBC made a documentary comparing the cases of White Hawk, who was Native American, and Baxter Berry, an elderly white man and the son of former Governor Tom Berry, who'd recently been acquitted of killing Norman Little Brave, an unarmed 28-year-old Native American man, on his farm and leaving him to die. Berry had been charged only two months later, after the victim's wife failed a complaint, and was acquitted on grounds of self-defense. Berry's lawyer, Sam Masten, had made racist remarks after the trial, blaming it on "political do-gooders" who "don't know anything about Indians." He claimed that Berry was fearing for his life and would've otherwise been "another Yeado," referencing the man whom White Hawk had killed.

At a hearing with the South Dakota Board of Pardons and Paroles, White Hawk testified that he believed his father, who died in a car accident when he was 10, and had beaten his mother to death. He later attended segregated American Indian boarding schools run by the Bureau of Indian Affairs and an Episcopal church school in Mission, South Dakota. While awaiting sentencing, a psychiatrist had testified that White Hawk had a mental disorder. The board recommended that White Hawk's death sentence be commuted to life in prison. Their decision stated that while a death sentence would be entirely justifiable for the crimes committed by White Hawk, he had chosen to plead guilty and there was no objection to clemency by judge. Farrar defended the state's death penalty and denied any claims of anti-Indigenous racism, but accepted the recommendation, describing White Hawk as the product of a "tragic social environment" and questioning his mental stability. White Hawk died in prison on May 7, 1997, at the age of 49. In the 1980s, Farrar said White Hawk deserved to be executed and implied that he'd only commuted his death sentence out of fear of a Native American uprising which potentially could've resulted in many more deaths. Shortly after White Hawk died in prison, he reiterated this position, but said he did not regret granting clemency.

After his two-year term as governor concluded, Farrar moved back to Britton to practice law. He also became a successful banker later in life, buying, operating and selling a number of local banks in small towns and in rural areas in the Dakotas, Minnesota and as far as Indiana, Montana and New Mexico. As a philanthropist, he generously supported various non-profit organizations, such as Scouts, the March of Dimes, and the South Dakota Community Foundation.

== Later life ==
Farrar was a licensed aviator who flew to visit the banks he owned, and over the years, he accumulated over 17,000 hours of logged piloting time. He was also an avid athlete, completing the Kona Ironman Competition at age 73, a decade after surviving lymphatic cancer. He held the 9th fastest finishing time in the Coeur D'Alene Ironman in the 70+ Men's division. He completed the 2003 race in 16:48:49. His wife, former First Lady of South Dakota Patricia Farrar, who was also a Senior Olympian, died on October 31, 2015, at the age of 84.

On October 31, 2021, Farrar died in Rochester, Minnesota, at age 92.

== Honors and awards ==
- Alumni of the Year for the School of Business at the University of South Dakota (USD), 1979
- the USD Achievement Award, 1981
- Distinguished Eagle Scout Award, 2001
- Inducted into the South Dakota Hall of Fame, 2006.
- Parade Marshal for the 104th "Dakota Days" homecoming parade at USD, 2018

Legal offices
Preceded by Albert C. Miller	Attorney General of South Dakota; 1963–1969	Succeeded by Gordon J. Mydland
Party political offices
Preceded by Albert C. Miller	Republican nominee for Attorney General of South Dakota; 1962, 1964, 1966	Succeeded by Gordon Mydland
Preceded by Nils Boe	Republican nominee for Governor of South Dakota; 1968, 1970	Succeeded by Carveth Thompson
Political offices
Preceded by Nils Boe	Governor of South Dakota; 1969–1971	Succeeded by Richard F. Kneip
