= 1974 South Dakota gubernatorial election =

- November 5, 1974
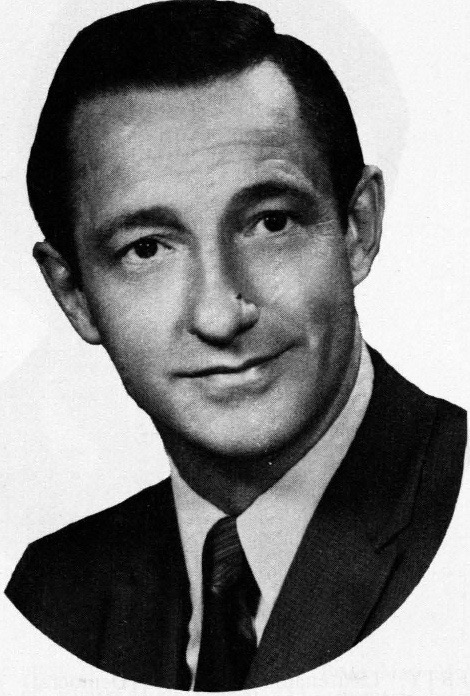

Nominee	Richard F. Kneip	John E. Olson
Party	Democratic	Republican
Running mate	Harvey L. Wollman	Charles Clay
Popular vote	149,151	129,077
Percentage	53.61%	46.39%
- County results Kneip: 50–60% 60–70% Olson: 50–60% 60–70% 70–80%
Governor before election
Richard F. Kneip
Democratic
Governor
Richard F. Kneip
Democratic

The 1974 South Dakota gubernatorial election was held on November 5, 1974, to elect a governor of South Dakota. This election was the first in South Dakota to elect the governor for a four-year term, after it was allowed by a constitutional amendment passed in 1972. Democratic nominee and Governor Richard F. Kneip was re-elected, defeating Republican nominee John E. Olson. As of 2026, this is the last time that a Democrat was elected governor of South Dakota, marking the start of the longest Republican winning streak in the country for a state's governorship, as well as the longest gubernatorial winning streak by a single party.

== Democratic primary ==
=== Candidates ===
- Bill Dougherty, lieutenant governor of South Dakota
- Richard F. Kneip, incumbent governor of South Dakota

=== Results ===
Democratic primary results
Party	Candidate	Votes	%
Democratic	Richard F. Kneip (incumbent)	45,932	66.19
Democratic	Bill Dougherty	23,467	33.81
Total votes		69,399	100.00

== Republican primary ==
=== Candidates ===
- Oscar W. Hagen
- John E. Olson
- Ronald F. Williamson

=== Results ===
Democratic primary results
Party	Candidate	Votes	%
Republican	John E. Olson	49,973	55.57
Republican	Ronald F. Williamson	25,509	28.37
Republican	Oscar W. Hagen	14,444	16.06
Total votes		89,926	100.00

== General election ==
=== Results ===
South Dakota gubernatorial election, 1974
Party	Candidate	Votes	%
Democratic	Richard F. Kneip (inc.)	149,151	53.61
Republican	John E. Olson	129,077	46.39
Total votes		278,228	100.00
Democratic hold			
