= 1970 South Dakota gubernatorial election =

- November 3, 1970
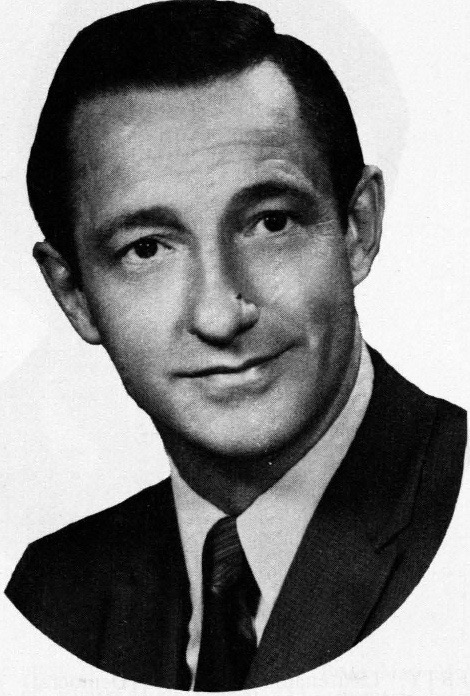

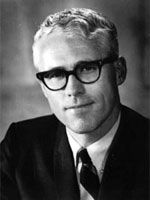
Nominee	Richard F. Kneip	Frank Farrar
Party	Democratic	Republican
Popular vote	131,616	108,347
Percentage	54.85%	45.15%
- County results Kneip: 50–60% 60–70% Farrar: 50–60% 60–70% 70–80%
Governor before election
Frank Farrar
Republican
Elected Governor
Richard F. Kneip
Democratic

The 1970 South Dakota gubernatorial election was held on November 3, 1970. Primary elections were held on June 2, 1970. Incumbent Republican Governor Frank Farrar was defeated by Democratic nominee Richard F. Kneip who won 54.85% of the vote.

This is the last time that an incumbent governor of South Dakota lost re-election.

== Primaries ==
=== Democratic primary ===
==== Candidates ====
- Richard F. Kneip, State Senator

==== Results ====
Democratic primary results
Party	Candidate	Votes	%
Democratic	Richard F. Kneip		unopposed

=== Republican primary ===
==== Candidates ====
- Frank Farrar, incumbent Governor
- Frank E. Henderson, State Senator

==== Results ====
Republican primary results
Party	Candidate	Votes	%
Republican	Frank Farrar (incumbent)	48,520	58.17
Republican	Frank E. Henderson	34,893	41.83
Total votes		83,413	100.00

== General election ==
=== Candidates ===
- Frank Farrar, Republican
- Richard F. Kneip, Democratic

=== Results ===
1970 South Dakota gubernatorial election
Party	Candidate	Votes	%	±%
Democratic	Richard F. Kneip	131,616	54.85%	
Republican	Frank Farrar (incumbent)	108,347	45.15%	
Majority		23,269	9.70%	
Turnout		239,963	100.00%	
Democratic gain from Republican		Swing		

== Bibliography ==
- Gubernatorial Elections, 1787-1997. Washington, D.C.: Congressional Quarterly Inc. 1998. ISBN 1-56802-396-0.
- Scammon, Richard M., ed. (1972). America Votes 9: a handbook of contemporary American election statistics, 1970. Washington, D.C.: Governmental Affairs Institute.
