= Connie Redbird Pinkerman-Uri =

Native American doctor (1928–2009)

- Born: September 3, 1928; Wheatland, California, USA
- Died: June 8, 2009 (aged 80)
- Education: University of Arkansas; Whittier College
- Occupations: doctor and lawyer
- Organization(s): Association of American Indian Physicians; Indian Women United for Social Justice; Women of All Red Nations

Constance Redbird "Connie" Pinkerman-Uri (September 3, 1928 – June 8, 2009) was an American doctor and lawyer who was the first Native American woman to hold degrees in both law and medicine. In the 1970s, she investigated the Indian Health Service's practice of carrying out involuntary sterilisations against Native American women, which led to the practice being formally prohibited by the US government.

== Early life, education and career ==
Pinkerman-Uri, who was Choctaw and Cherokee, was from Wheatland, California.

In 1955, Pinkerman-Uri graduated as a doctor from the University of Arkansas. She subsequently practiced as a doctor in Los Angeles, where she set up the first free Indian hospital during the 1960s, as well as partaking in efforts to secure Fort McArthur, an abandoned military hospital, for use as an Indian hospital.

In the 1970s, Pinkerman-Uri returned to university, graduating with a JD degree from Whittier College law school in 1979. Pinkerman-Uri was admitted to the State Bar of California in 1980.

Pinkerman-Uri was the first Native American woman to earn degrees in both law and medicine.

== Investigation into forced sterilisation ==
In 1972, Pinkerman-Uri treated a Native American patient who requested a uterus transplant, having been told by a doctor from the Indian Health Service in 1966 that this was possible; they had removed her uterus as part of 'routine' treatment for alcoholism. Pinkerman-Uri subsequently started an investigation into involuntary sterilisations among Native American women, interviewing current and former patients. She also visited sites including the Claremore Indian Hospital in Claremore, Oklahoma, where she found that 100 women had been sterilised in 1973 alone.

Pinkerman-Uri's 1974 study estimated that less than 100, 000 Native American women remained unsterilised, with around quarter of women having been sterilised. She concluded that the Indian Health Service was running a "sterilisation factory", and accused them of perpetrating a genocide against Native Americans, commenting that they "singled out full-blooded Indian women for sterilisation procedures".

Pinkerman-Uri presented her findings to James Abourezk, Senator from South Dakota, who subsequently ordered the General Accounting Office to carry out an investigation into her findings. In 1976, the investigation concluded that there was no evidence of coerced sterilisations, but did note that consent forms failed to comply with national regulations, including not explicitly mentioning that patients had the right to refuse procedures, and that record keeping by the service was inadequate. The investigation found that four of the 12 Indian Health Service regions had sterilised 3406 women without their permission between 1973 and 1976, and that 36 women under the age of 21 had undergone sterilisation despite a court-ordered moratorium on sterilising women younger than 21.

In 1977, Pinkerman-Uri's findings were published Akwesasne Notes, a Native American journal, under the editorial "The Theft of Life", having been originally published in the National Catholic Reporter. In 1978, the Department of Health, Education and Welfare established regulations that prohibited involuntary sterilisations.

Pinkerman-Uri's supporters stated she was harassed by the US government following the publication of her findings. Pinkerman-Uri's investigation led to the establishment of Women of All Red Nations, a group promoting resistance against violence against Native American women.

== Other activism ==
Pinkerman-Uri helped members of the Northern Cheyenne Indian Reservation in Montana use the Clean Air Act to protect their reservation from the impact of emissions from nearby factories.

In 1973, Pinkerman-Uri organised a caravan of supplies for protestors during the Wounded Knee Occupation; she also paid bail for protestors who had been arrested.

Pinkerman-Uri was a member of the Association of American Indian Physicians and Indian Women United for Social Justice.
