= Nate Thayer =

American journalist (1960–2023)

- Thayer in 1990
- Born: Nathaniel Talbott Thayer; April 21, 1960; Washington, D.C., U.S.
- Died: c. January 3, 2023 (aged 62) (Note: Body found on this date); Falmouth, Massachusetts, U.S.
- Education: University of Massachusetts, Boston
- Occupation: Journalist
- Father: Harry E. T. Thayer
- Website: natethayer.typepad.com/blog/

Nathaniel Talbott Thayer (April 21, 1960 – c. January 3, 2023) was an American freelance journalist whose work focused on international organized crime, narcotics trafficking, human rights, and areas of military conflict.

He is most notable for having interviewed Pol Pot, in his capacity as Cambodia correspondent for the Far Eastern Economic Review. He also wrote for Jane's Defence Weekly, Soldier of Fortune, the Associated Press, and more than 40 other publications, including The Cambodia Daily and The Phnom Penh Post.

On January 3, 2023, Thayer was found dead at home in Falmouth, Massachusetts. His health had been declining for about a decade. According to Thayer's brother, the exact timing of his death was not clear.

== Early life and education ==
Nathaniel Talbott Thayer was born in 1960 in Washington, D.C. He was the son of Joan Pirie Leclerc and Harry E. T. Thayer, who was United States Ambassador to Singapore from 1980 to 1985. His mother was from the Carson, Pirie, Scott family. His uncle was lawyer Robert S. Pirie, and his great-uncle was Democratic presidential nominee Adlai Stevenson II.

Thayer studied at the University of Massachusetts Boston, though he did not receive a degree. From 1980 to 1982 he was involved with the Boston-based Clamshell Alliance, acting as spokesman during protest events at the Seabrook Nuclear Power Plant as well as anti-draft protests.

== Career ==
Thayer began his career in Southeast Asia on the Thai-Cambodian border, taking part in an academic research project in which he interviewed 50 Cham survivors of Khmer Rouge atrocities at Nong Samet Refugee Camp in 1984. He then returned to Massachusetts where he worked briefly as the Transportation Director for the state Office of Handicapped Affairs. Thayer himself noted, "I got fired. I was a really bad bureaucrat."

Thayer later worked for Soldier of Fortune magazine reporting on guerrilla combat in Burma, and in 1989 he began reporting for the Associated Press from the Thai-Cambodian border. In October 1989, Thayer was nearly killed when an anti-tank mine exploded under a truck he was riding in. In 1991 he moved to Cambodia where he began writing for the Far Eastern Economic Review.

In August 1992, Thayer traveled to Mondulkiri Province and visited the last of the United Front for the Liberation of Oppressed Races (FULRO) Montagnard guerrillas who had remained loyal to their former American commanders. Thayer informed the group that FULRO's president Y Bham Enuol had been executed by the Khmer Rouge seventeen years previously. The FULRO troops surrendered their weapons in October 1992; many of this group were given asylum in the United States.

In April 1994, Thayer participated in (and funded) the Cambodian Kouprey Research Project, a $30,000, two-week, 150 km field survey to find the rare Cambodian bovine known as the kouprey. Thayer later wrote: "After compiling a team of expert jungle trackers, scientists, security troops, elephant mahouts and one of the most motley and ridiculous looking groups of armed journalists in recent memory, we marched cluelessly into Khmer Rouge-controlled jungles along the old Ho Chi Minh trail."

On July 3, 1994, Thayer was asked to help negotiate Prince Norodom Chakrapong's release and safe passage to the airport after the prince had been accused by Prime Minister Norodom Ranariddh of plotting a coup d'état. Thayer was subsequently expelled from Cambodia by Prince Ranariddh, but he returned anyway.

In early 1997, he was again expelled from Cambodia for exposing connections between Prime Minister Hun Sen and heroin traffickers. Thayer then decided to pursue a fellowship at Johns Hopkins University. He was a visiting scholar at the Paul H. Nitze School of Advanced International Studies at Johns Hopkins University.

=== Pol Pot's trial ===
In July 1997, Nate Thayer and Asiaworks Television cameraman David McKaige visited the Anlong Veng Khmer Rouge jungle camp inside Cambodia where Pol Pot was being tried for treason. Thayer had hoped for an interview but was disappointed:

Pol Pot said nothing. They made it clear and I believed them, that I was to interview Pol Pot after the trial. Pol Pot literally had to be carried away from the trial—he was unable to walk—and I was not able to talk to him. I did try to talk to him ... he did not answer any questions, and he did not speak during the trial.

Thayer noted, "Every ounce of his being was struggling to maintain some last vestige of dignity."

Thayer believed that the trial had been staged by the Khmer Rouge for him and McKaige:

It was put on specifically for us, to take the message to the world that Pol Pot has been denounced. They had reported on their radio, on June 19, that Pol Pot had been purged. No one believed them. After five years of lying over their radio, there was no reason anyone should take what they say credibly. It was clear to them that they needed an independent, credible witness to show what was happening.

=== Nightline controversy ===
According to Thayer, Ted Koppel of ABC News made a verbal agreement with Thayer to use footage from the trial on Nightline, then violated that agreement:

[Koppel] returned home with a copy of my videotape. I gave it to him in exchange for his strict promise that its only use would be on Nightline. However, once he had the copy of the tape, ABC News released video, still pictures, and even transcripts of my interviews to news organizations throughout the world. Protected by its formidable legal and public relations department, ABC News made still photographs from the video, slapped the "ABC News Exclusive" logo on them, and hand delivered them to newspapers, wire services, and television ... All of these pictures demanded that photo credit be given to ABC News ... The story won a British Press Award for "Scoop of the Year" for a British paper I didn't even know had published it ... I even won a Peabody Award as a "correspondent for Nightline". But I turned it down—the first time anyone had rejected a Peabody in its 57-year history.

ABC News responded that they had "agreed to pay Nate Thayer the sizable sum of $350,000 (worth $702,000 in 2025) for the rights to use his footage of former Cambodian dictator Pol Pot. Despite the fact that ABC provided prominent and repeated credit and generous remuneration for his work, Mr. Thayer initiated a five-year barrage of complaints coupled with repeated demands for more money."

=== Interview with Pol Pot ===
In October 1997, Thayer returned to Anlong Veng and became only the second western journalist (after Elizabeth Becker in 1978) ever to be granted an interview with the former dictator and, along with McKaige, was certainly the last outsider to see him alive. Thayer recounted the story of his interview with Pol Pot in his unpublished book Sympathy for the Devil: Living Dangerously in Cambodia – A Foreign Correspondent's Story. Pol Pot told Thayer:

First, I want to let you know that I came to join the revolution, not to kill the Cambodian people. Look at me now. Do you think ... am I a violent person? No. So, as far as my conscience and my mission were concerned, there was no problem. This needs to be clarified ... My experience was the same as that of my movement. We were new and inexperienced and events kept occurring one after the other which we had to deal with. In doing that, we made mistakes as I told you. I admit it now and I admitted it in the notes I have written. Whoever wishes to blame or attack me is entitled to do so. I regret I didn't have enough experience to totally control the movement. On the other hand, with our constant struggle, this had to be done together with others in the communist world to stop Kampuchea becoming Vietnamese. For the love of the nation and the people it was the right thing to do but in the course of our actions we made mistakes.

=== The death of Pol Pot ===
Thayer visited Anlong Veng again on April 16, 1998, only a day after Pol Pot had died. After photographing the corpse he briefly interviewed Ta Mok and Pol Pot's second wife Muon, who told Thayer, "What I would like the world to know is that he was a good man, a patriot, a good father." Thayer was then asked to transport Pol Pot's body in his pickup truck to the site a short distance away where it was later cremated.

Thayer claimed that Pol Pot committed suicide by drinking poison because of his belief that the Khmer Rouge were planning to "hand him over to the Americans".

=== Interview with Kang Kek Iew ===
In April 1999, Thayer, alongside photojournalist Nic Dunlop, interviewed Kang Kek Iew (Comrade Duch) for the Far Eastern Economic Review after Dunlop had tracked Duch to Samlaut and suspected strongly that he was the former director of the notorious S-21 security prison. Dunlop wanted Duch to provide clues that would reveal his identity, and Thayer began probing Duch's story that he was Hang Pin, an aid worker and a born-again Christian:

Then Nate said, "I believe that you also worked with the security services during the Khmer Rouge Period?" Duch appeared startled and avoided our eyes ... Again Nate put the question to him ... He looked unsettled and his eyes darted about ... He then glanced at Nate's business card ... "I believe, Nic, that your friend has interviewed Monsieur Ta Mok and Monsieur Pol Pot?" ... He sat back down...and inhaled deeply. "It is God's will that you are here," he said.

Duch surrendered to the authorities in Phnom Penh following the publication of this interview. Dunlop and Thayer were first runners-up for the 1999 SAIS-Novartis Prize for Excellence in International Journalism, presented by The Paul H. Nitze School of Advanced International Studies, for "exposing the inside story of the Khmer Rouge killing machine".

=== Subsequent work ===
Nate Thayer also covered Albania, Indonesia, Mongolia and the Philippines. In 2003, he reported on the Iraq War in a five-part series for Slate magazine. He also covered the Bangkok 2010 Redshirt riots. During 2011 he worked for the International Consortium of Investigative Journalists' Center for Public Integrity writing a three-month investigation on North Korea as a rogue state financed by criminal activity. In December 2011, he came out in opposition to the International Treaty to Ban Landmines, believing that militant groups would then resort to alternative tactics, many of which pose a greater risk to civilians.

=== KKK and white supremacists ===
In 2015, Thayer was the author of a controversial series of articles about racially motivated demonstrations which occurred in Charleston, South Carolina, in the wake of the shootings which were carried out by Dylann Roof. The stories, which were first published on MarxRand.com, eventually attracted attention from the mainstream press. In particular, a story called "Patriot Games" was picked up by mainstream news organizations after being published on MarxRand.com. It was subsequently commissioned as a separate story run in Vice later the same week. In the original version of the story, Thayer claimed that a Ku Klux Klan leader named Chris Barker was doubling as an undercover FBI operative "working for and protected by the U.S. Joint Terrorism Task Force". As a result of Barker's outing and in September 2015, Thayer wrote that "Mr Barker (has called and) hung up the phone several times, sent me incendiary emails and made threatening phone calls, and has since gone on White Nationalist internet forums to try to denounce the articles and defend his reputation" and Thayer also wrote that other Klan members had "threatened to decapitate my dog".

=== Plagiarism controversy ===
Blogger Jeremy Duns accused Thayer of plagiarism on March 7, 2013, a claim that was echoed in New York magazine. Mark Ziegler, author of the article in question, told the Columbia Journalism Review that he was "not ready to accuse Thayer of plagiarism", and said "I have no reason not to respect him as a fellow journalist." Ziegler said he was "not completely satisfied with the way [his article] was ultimately attributed" even in the corrected version of "25 Years of Slam Dunk Diplomacy". The Columbia Journalism Review concluded that Thayer's "attribution was sloppy and he represented quotes that were said in other places as if they were said to him" but that it did not appear to be a case of plagiarism. The CJR interviewed Thayer's sources, and at least one confirmed he was interviewed extensively by Thayer.

=== Final years ===
In September 2021, Thayer created a Substack called "Exit Wounds: Nate Thayer on Political Extremism". Thayer subsequently published three stories; two about the Oath Keepers, largely in relation to the January 6 United States Capitol attack, and one entitled, "Why I am a journalist and Anti-Fascist", in which he described his medical struggles and his relationship with anti-fascist documentarian Rod Webber. In December 2022, Thayer posted a four-minute segment to Facebook of Webber's animated documentary "The Man Who Killed Pol Pot", about Thayer's exploits. According to Webber's description of the video, "The narration is taken from Nate's essays as well as his 800-page manuscript." In a final article posted to the Exit Wounds Substack, Webber announced Thayer's death and that, "Nate was working on a major exposé which we will publish here."

== Death ==
According to an article in the New York Times, Thayer's health had been declining around the last decade of his life. Around this time, he also used alcohol and drugs. On Facebook in August 2022, Thayer wrote that he had been afflicted with "two strokes, two heart attacks, two bouts with COVID-19, sepsis infections which went viral and left me with heart and other damage".

On January 3, 2023, Thayer was found dead at home in Falmouth, Massachusetts. His brother, Robert, who found his body, said that it was not clear exactly when he died.

== Personal life ==
Thayer resided in the U.S. and in Cambodia. His website, Nate-Thayer.com, which was active for many years, is no longer accessible. In 2000, Thayer returned to the United States and bought a farmhouse in Maryland. Then he moved to Falmouth, Massachusetts on Cape Cod along with his pet dog Lamont.

== Honors and awards ==
Thayer's reporting earned him the 1998 Francis Frost Wood Award for Courage in Journalism, given by Hofstra University in Hempstead, New York to a journalist "judged to best exemplify physical or moral courage in the practice of his or her craft." He was the first recipient of the Center for Public Integrity's ICIJ (International Consortium of Investigative Journalists) Award for Outstanding International Investigative Reporting in November 1998. Upon awarding Thayer the ICIJ Award, the judges noted:

He illuminated a page of history that would have been lost to the world had he not spent years in the Cambodian jungle, in a truly extraordinary quest for first-hand knowledge of the Khmer Rouge and their murderous leader. His investigations of the Cambodian political world required not only great risk and physical hardship but also mastery of an ever-changing cast of factional characters.

According to Vaudine England of the BBC, "Many of the region's greatest names in reporting made their mark in the pages of the Review, from the legendary Richard Hughes of Korean War fame, to Nate Thayer, the journalist who found Cambodia's Khmer Rouge leader Pol Pot."

Thayer was also the first person in 57 years to turn down a prestigious Peabody Award, because he did not want to share it with ABC News' Nightline who he believed stole his story and deprived him and the Far Eastern Economic Review of income.

Since 1999 Hofstra University's Department of Journalism and Mass Media Studies in the School of Communication has awarded the Nate Thayer Scholarship to a qualified student with the best foreign story idea. Winners are selected on the basis of scholastic achievement or potential as well as economic need.
