= In the Spirit of Crazy Horse =

1983 book by Peter Matthiessen

- first edition cover
- Author: Peter Matthiessen
- Language: English
- Genre: Non-fiction
- Publication date: 1983
- Publication place: United States

In the Spirit of Crazy Horse is a book by Peter Matthiessen which chronicles "the story of Leonard Peltier and the FBI's war on the American Indian Movement." It was first published in 1983. Leonard Peltier was convicted of murder in 1977 and sentenced to life in prison for the 1975 killing of two FBI agents, after a trial which the author and many others allege was based on fabricated evidence, widespread fraud, and government misconduct.

== Synopsis ==
The book portrays a politically violent period on the Lakota Nation's Pine Ridge Indian Reservation during that time, including the 1973 'Wounded Knee Incident' and the following "Reign of Terror," and describes the 1975 'Pine Ridge Shoot–out' or 'Oglala Firefight' and the subsequent trials and their aftermath. Distribution of the book was interrupted for almost a decade while legal challenges against it were resolved.

Whatever the nature and degree of his participation at Oglala, the ruthless persecution of Leonard Peltier had less to do with his own actions than with underlying issues of history, racism, and economics, in particular, Indian sovereignty claims and growing opposition to massive energy development on treaty lands and dwindling reservations.

— op.cit., page xx

== Reception ==
The book was well received critically. Many scholars praised Matthiessen's veracity and accuracy, and the author's support for Leonard Peltier, AIM, and the Lakota people was acknowledged and appreciated by those parties.

The book was finally published in hardcover in 1991, with a new Epilogue by the author and an Afterword by Martin Garbus, after lawsuits alleging libel were dismissed by the various courts and their decisions affirmed upon appeal. The lawsuits and their attendant rulings have become important and oft-cited cases in the areas of "media law" and "freedom of speech." After publicity generated by the lawsuits, the book became a bestseller.

Reception was not universally positive. In a review for the New York Times Book Review, law professor Alan Dershowitz wrote that Matthiessen "not only fails to convince, he inadvertently makes a strong case for Mr. Peltier's guilt. Invoking the clichés of the radical left, Mr. Matthiessen takes at face value nearly every conspiratorial claim of the movement, no matter how unfounded or preposterous. Every car crash, every unexplained death, every unrelated arrest fits into the seamless web of deceit he seems to feel woven by the FBI and its cohorts." Scott Anderson's 1995 re-examination of the Peltier case for Outside magazine considered the impact of the book. Anderson wrote: "Taken as a whole, what Matthiessen had constructed was a vast subterranean network of conspirators—not just FBI agents, prosecutors, and judges, but apparently county coroners, stenographers, fire investigators, and Canadian Mounties—all working in concert to destroy an AIM lieutenant because he and his movement dared, in some intangible way, to threaten the interests of white corporate America." A few issues later, Outside printed a lengthy rebuttal by Matthiessen, who opened with: "The hope of justice for Leonard Peltier, now in his 19th year in prison, has been seriously harmed by Outside's destructive piece about his case.”

== Lawsuits ==
After publication of the book, two plaintiffs filed libel suits against Viking Press. Bill Janklow, the former Republican governor of South Dakota, filed a $24 million lawsuit in South Dakota. He also sued three booksellers in South Dakota who had sold hardcover copies of the book. This case was watched because of its repressive aspects related to bookselling.

Janklow's suit was based upon one paragraph in the book which has statements by AIM leader Dennis Banks referring to rape allegations made against Janklow by Jancita Eagle Deer, a young Brulé Lakota on the Rosebud Indian Reservation. Banks also noted Janklow's arrest for driving drunk and nude on the Crow Creek Reservation in South Dakota in 1973.

Janklow filed a separate lawsuit against Newsweek magazine (Janklow v. Newsweek, 788 F2d 1300) for an article that contained the disputed passage. In his complaint, referring to the statement by Banks about rape, Janklow "cited a 1975 letter from Philip W. Buchen, head of the Office of Counsel to the President of the United States, to the Senate Committee on Labor and Public Welfare, saying that three Federal investigations found the allegations against him 'simply unfounded'. The Senate committee was considering Mr. Janklow's nomination as a director of the Legal Services Corporation." His appointment as Legal Service Corporation's first director was made by President Gerald Ford and approved by the U.S. Senate.

Viking Press filed a countersuit against Janklow in the Southern District of New York, which in part alleged that Janklow had interfered with the company's constitutional rights to publish and distribute the book. A South Dakota circuit court ruled that the book was not defamatory and terminated Janklow's lawsuit in 1984. Upon Janklow's appeal of the ruling, the South Dakota State Supreme Court reinstated the case in 1985.

David Price, an FBI agent who was at the Wounded Knee incident, filed two identical lawsuits against Viking: one in South Dakota state court (Price v. Viking Press, Inc., Civ. No. 84-448) and an identical suit (Price v. Viking Press, Inc., 625 F. Supp. 641) in federal court, seeking $25 million in United States District Court for the District of South Dakota. The case was transferred to a federal court in Minnesota.

The lawyers representing both Matthiessen and Viking Press in the federal suit in Minnesota were noted First Amendment lawyer Martin Garbus of Frankfurt, Garbus, Klein & Selz, New York City, with Barbara F.L. Penn, St. Paul, Minnesota.

In the Minnesota case, Federal District Court Judge Diana E. Murphy dismissed the Price suit. Her 33-page ruling noted, "Viking recognized that responsible publishing companies owe some duty to the public to undertake difficult but important works." Janklow's case in South Dakota was similarly dismissed. In both cases both the author and publisher were deemed to have been protected by the free speech clause of the First Amendment to the United States Constitution. It was noted that Matthiessen's book was clearly one with an opinion.
