= Harry E. T. Thayer =

American diplomat

Ambassador Harry E. T. Thayer
- 宋賀德

United States Ambassador to Singapore
- In office December 13, 1980 – June 14, 1984
- President: Jimmy Carter; Ronald Reagan
- Preceded by: Richard F. Kneip
- Succeeded by: J. Stapleton Roy

Personal details
- Born: Harry Elstner Talbott Thayer; September 10, 1927 Boston, Massachusetts, U.S.
- Died: January 21, 2017 (aged 89) Washington, D.C., U.S.
- Relatives: Nate Thayer (son)
- Education: Yale University

Harry Elstner Talbott Thayer (Chinese:宋賀德, September 10, 1927 – January 21, 2017) was an American diplomat who served as the seventh United States Ambassador to Singapore from 1980 to 1985.

== Early life, family and education ==
Thayer was born in Boston, Massachusetts.

From 1945 to 1946, Thayer served in the US Navy. He attended Yale University and graduated in 1951.

His son, Nate, was a journalist who gained recognition after he interviewed Pol Pot in 1997.

== Career ==
Thayer worked for Newsweek from 1952 to 1954, followed by two years with the Philadelphia Bulletin.

He entered the State Department's service in 1956, and until 1971 worked in Hong Kong, Taipei and China. From 1971 to 1975 he was a member of the US Mission at the United Nations, and then returned again to China, until 1980, when he was appointed ambassador to Singapore, succeeding Richard F. Kneip, who resigned his post. In 1984 he was appointed to lead the American Institute in Taiwan.

Diplomatic posts
| Preceded by Richard F. Kneip | United States Ambassador to Singapore; 1980–1984 | Succeeded by J. Stapleton Roy |
| Preceded by James R. Lilley | Director of the American Institute in Taiwan; 1984–1986 | Succeeded by David Dean |
