= Moses Stranger Horse =

American painter (1890–1941)

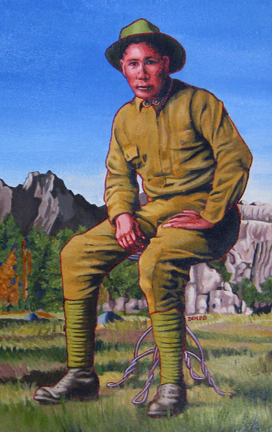
Moses Stranger Horse

Moses Stranger Horse (1890–1941) was a Brulé Lakota realist painter from the Rosebud Indian Reservation in South Dakota.

== Background ==
A Brulé Lakota from Rosebud, Stranger Horse was born outside of Wood, South Dakota in 1890. In 1911, he was taken to Pennsylvania to attend Carlisle Indian Industrial School. There he received art lessons from Angel De Cora, the accomplished Ho-Chunk painter, whose philosophy was that Native peoples could both maintain cultural pride and a place in mainstream society through art.

Stranger Horse joined the American Expeditionary Force and was stationed in Paris during World War I. After the war, he stayed on in Paris to pursue his artistic studies. He learned realistic oil painting techniques.

== Art career ==
Returning to South Dakota, Stranger Horse painted dramatic landscapes of his own homelands, sometimes with images of early Lakota people. Native cowboys and ranch hands were also favorite subjects. Besides working in oils, Stranger Horse also drew.

He traveled throughout the United States, demonstrating his painting skills at fairs and rodeos. Stranger Horse would perform feats of dexterity, such as painting with both hands simultaneously or painting with the canvas upside-down. He exhibited his work at the 1939 New York World's Fair and gave public painting demonstrations. His artist name was "Sundown." His work was celebrated by both European-American audiences as well as Native audiences.

== Death and legacy ==
Stranger Horse died in 1941 at the Rosebud Reservation. His work is in the collection of Red Cloud Heritage Center in Pine Ridge and the Journey Museum in Rapid City, South Dakota. "With all the progressive adventuresomeness inherent in the character of the western Sioux, Stranger Horse took the first bold step of any modern Sioux artists to intentionally and completely master what was still the foreign art forms of the white man."

== Gallery ==
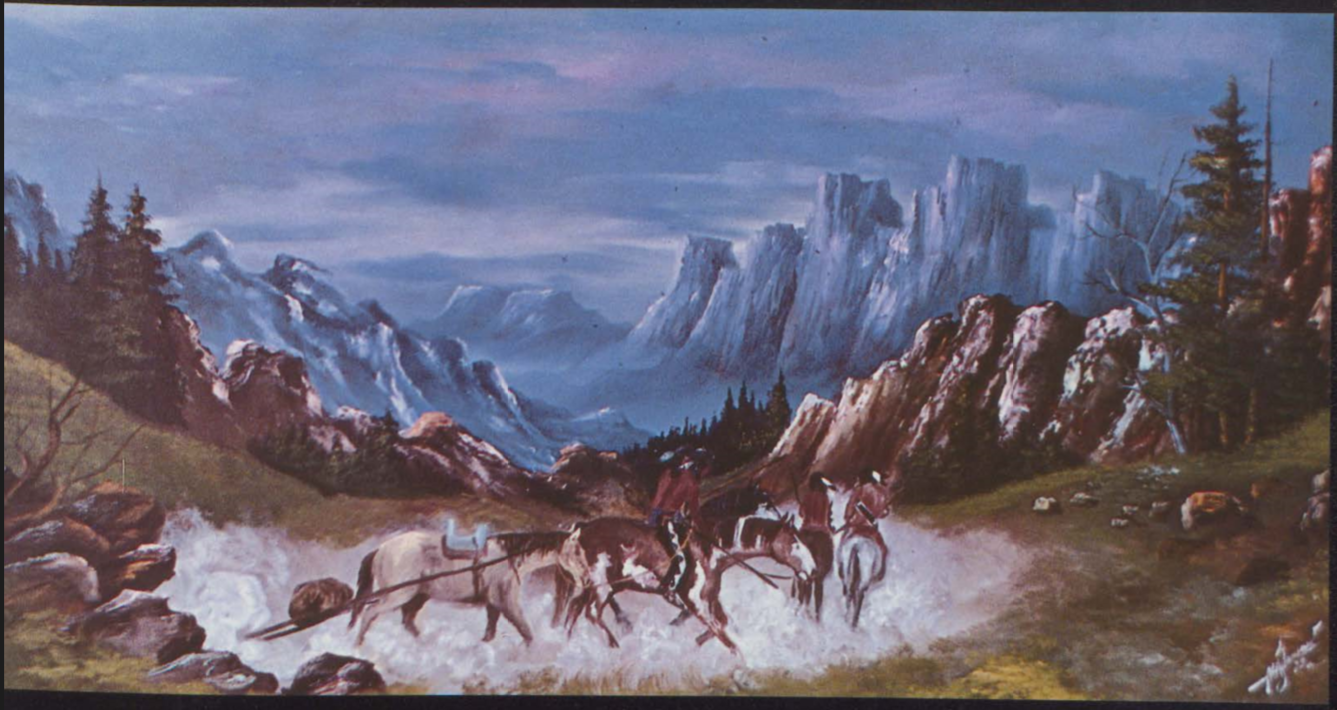
Moses Stranger Horse – On the Trail – painted 1933
