= Bill Janklow =

American politician (1939–2012)

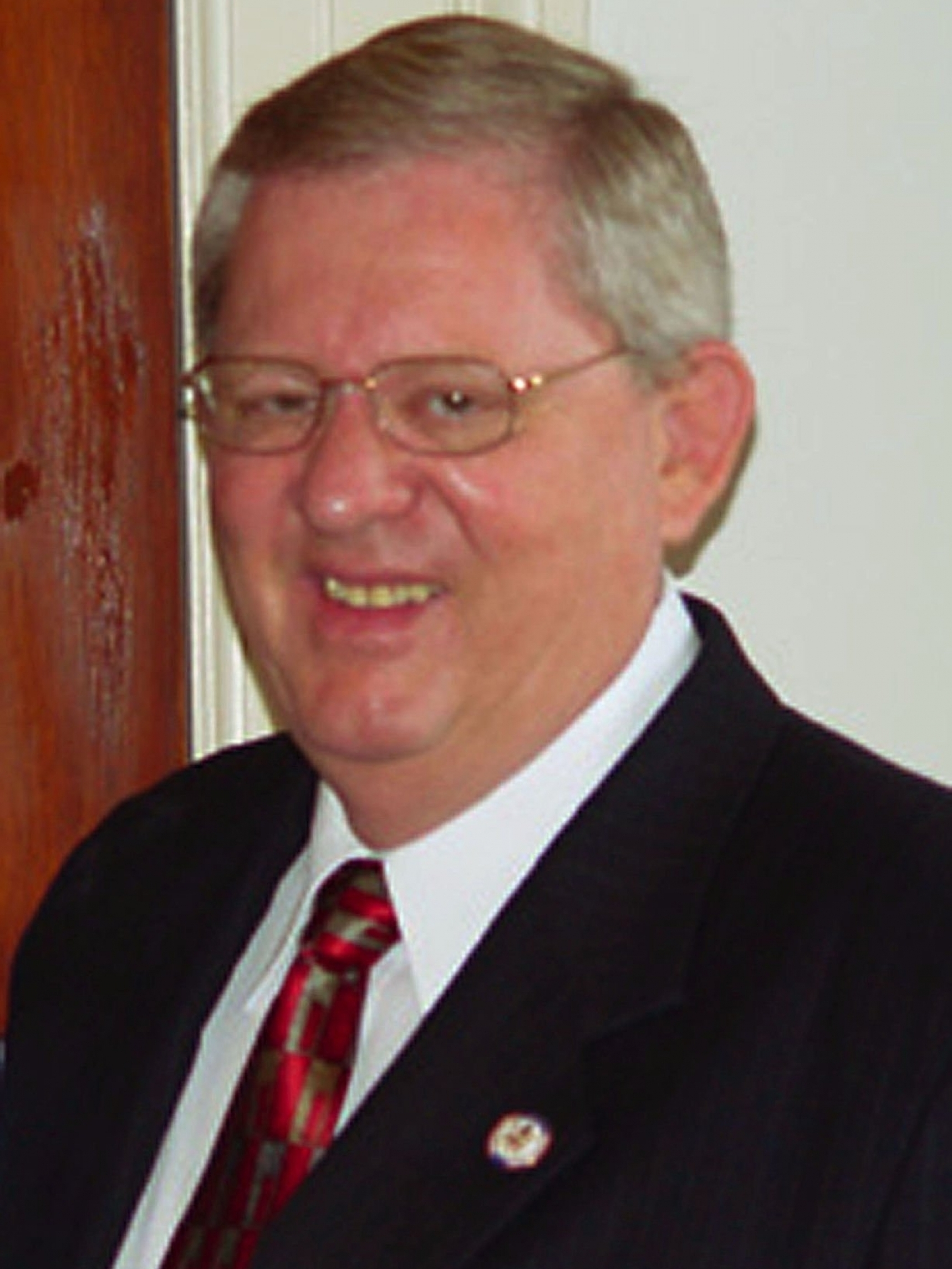
- Portrait, c. 2003

27th and 30th Governor of South Dakota
- In office January 7, 1995 – January 3, 2003
- Lieutenant: Carole Hillard
- Preceded by: Walter Dale Miller
- Succeeded by: Mike Rounds
- In office January 1, 1979 – January 6, 1987
- Lieutenant: Lowell Hansen
- Preceded by: Harvey Wollman
- Succeeded by: George S. Mickelson

Member of the U.S. House of Representatives from South Dakota's at-large district
- In office January 3, 2003 – January 20, 2004
- Preceded by: John Thune
- Succeeded by: Stephanie Herseth Sandlin

25th Attorney General of South Dakota
- In office January 3, 1975 – January 1, 1979
- Governor: Richard Kneip; Harvey Wollman
- Preceded by: Kermit Sande
- Succeeded by: Mark Meierhenry

Personal details
- Born: William John Janklow; September 13, 1939 Chicago, Illinois, U.S.
- Died: January 12, 2012 (aged 72) Sioux Falls, South Dakota, U.S.
- Resting place: Black Hills National Cemetery
- Party: Republican
- Spouse: Mary Dean Thom
- Education: University of South Dakota (BS, JD)

Military service
- Branch/service: United States Marine Corps
- Years of service: 1956–1959
- Rank: Private First Class
- Unit: 3rd Marine Division
- Battles/wars: Second Taiwan Strait Crisis
- Awards: 823 Badge of Honor (Taiwan)
- Criminal information
- Conviction: Second-degree manslaughter

Details
- Victims: Randy Scott (killed); Jancita Eagle Deer (allegedly raped; not fully investigated)
- Span of crimes: Potentially the 1960s – 2003
- Location: Trent, South Dakota (crash)
- Killed: 1
- Date apprehended: Sometime in August 2003

William John Janklow (September 13, 1939 – January 12, 2012) was an American lawyer and politician and member of the Republican Party. He holds the record for the longest tenure as the governor of South Dakota: sixteen years in office. Janklow had the third-longest gubernatorial tenure in post-Constitutional U.S. history at 5,851 days. He also served in the United States House of Representatives from 2003 until he resigned in 2004 following a conviction for manslaughter for a 2003 automobile crash.

Janklow's career was tainted, but not significantly impeded, in 1974 by accusations of raping 15-year-old Native American Jancita Eagle Deer at gunpoint in 1967, an act for which Janklow was locally disbarred. The FBI reopened the case in 1975 when Janklow was appointed by Gerald Ford to the board of the Legal Services Corporation, but investigations were closed at the request of the White House. Jancita and her mother Delphine died shortly thereafter, of apparently unrelated homicides.

Janklow served as the 25th attorney general of South Dakota from 1975 to 1979 before being elected as the state's 27th governor. He served two terms, from 1979 to 1987. He was elected again in 1994, and served as the 30th governor another two full terms, from 1995 to 2003.

== Early life, education, and military service ==
Janklow was born in Chicago, Illinois. When Janklow was 10 years old, his father Arthur died of a heart attack while working as a prosecutor at the Nuremberg Trials in Germany. His mother Lou Ella moved the family back to the United States. In 1954 when Janklow was 15, they settled in her home town of Flandreau, South Dakota.

In 1955, Janklow's repeated acts of juvenile delinquency landed him in court. A judge gave him two options—reform school or the military.

Janklow dropped out of high school and joined the U.S. Marine Corps in 1956. He attended basic training at Camp Pendleton, California. He was trained as a personnel clerk and assigned to the 3rd Marine Division at Camp Kinser, Okinawa. He was part of the Marine contingent that participated in the U.S. response to the 1958 Quemoy-Matsu international crisis. Janklow was shot in the leg while he was part of a detachment that was delivering cannons to Taiwanese troops, and received an honorable discharge as a private first class in 1959. In 1999, the government of Taiwan presented Janklow the 823 Badge of Honor, an award created to commemorate the Quemoy-Matsu conflict, which began on August 23, 1958.

After leaving the Marines, Janklow started classes at the University of South Dakota. When administrators discovered he lacked a high school diploma, Janklow convinced them to let him remain at the university if he maintained good grades. He graduated in 1964 with a Bachelor of Science degree in business administration.

== Legal career ==
Janklow went on to earn a J.D. at the University of South Dakota School of Law in 1966. He worked as Legal Services lawyer for six years on the Rosebud Indian Reservation, advancing to direct the program there.

In 1973, he was appointed chief prosecutor and chief of litigation in the South Dakota Attorney General's Office, where he "quickly earned a reputation as a top trial lawyer".

=== Attorney General of South Dakota ===
In 1974, Janklow was the successful Republican nominee for attorney general, and he served from 1975 to 1979. Among the highlights of his term were two cases he argued before the United States Supreme Court, South Dakota v. Opperman and Rosebud Sioux Tribe v. Kneip. In Opperman, Janklow argued successfully (5 Justices to 4) that a warrantless search of a vehicle that had been impounded for a parking violation was permissible. (The South Dakota Supreme Court later suppressed the search on state constitutional grounds.)

In Rosebud, Janklow successfully argued (6 Justices to 3) the legality of federal statutes which had reduced the size of the Rosebud Indian Reservation without regard to the provisions of existing treaties between the tribe and the federal government.

== First period as Governor of South Dakota ==
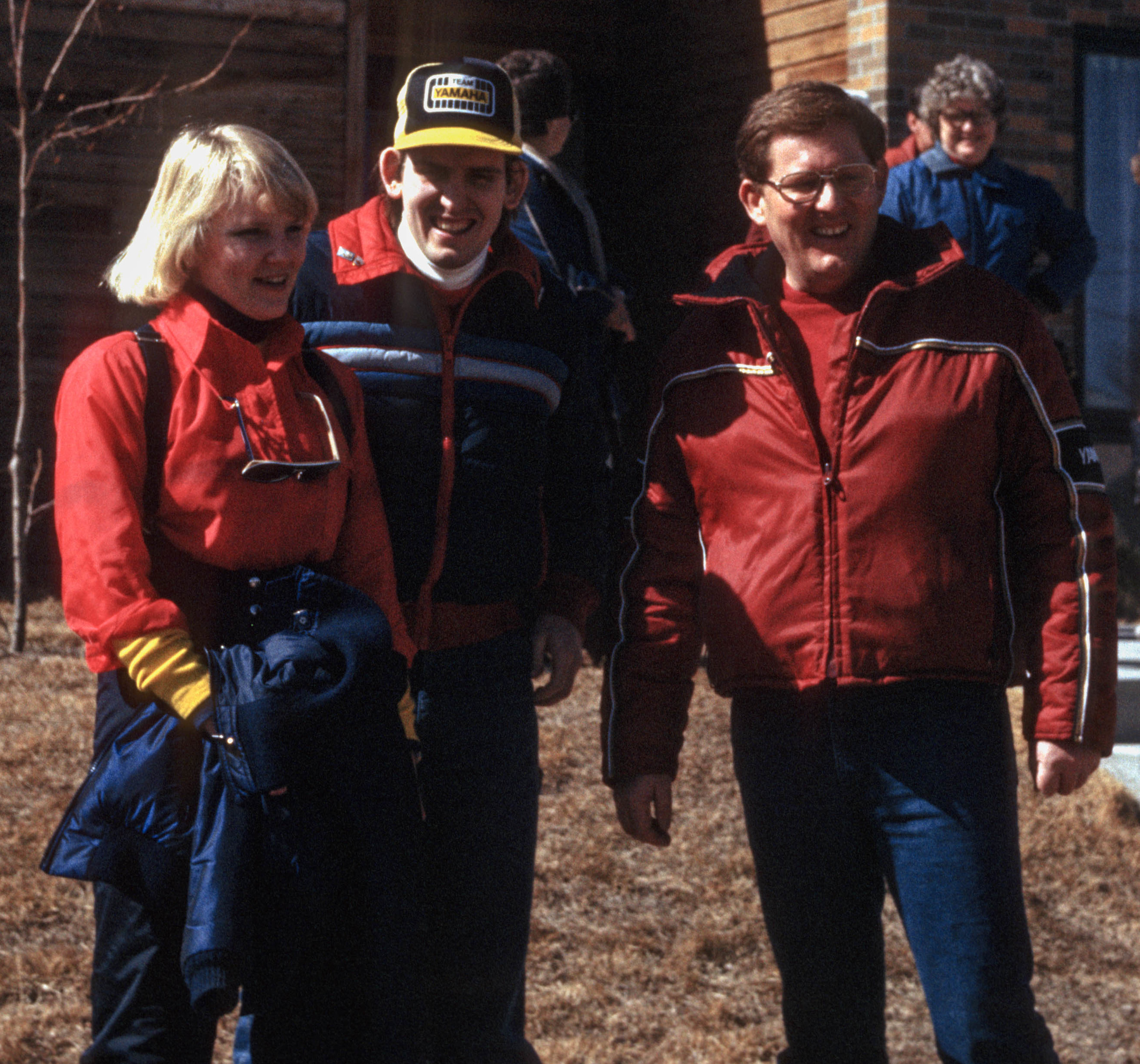
Janklow (right) at the 1983 Governor's Snowmobile Ride through the Black Hills

Janklow was first elected governor in 1978. He was reelected in 1982 with nearly 71 percent of the vote, the highest percentage won by a gubernatorial candidate in the state's history. The legislature had repealed the personal property tax the year before he took office, but did not provide a replacement revenue source. Since the personal property tax funded local governments, the legislature mandated that the state government replace the revenue. Once in office, Janklow worked with the legislature to make up the lost tax income by enacting a contractor's excise tax and reforming the franchise tax on banks. An improved economy also helped in the state's effort to make up the lost revenue.

In 1979 Janklow signed into law a bill reinstating capital punishment in South Dakota. Another initiative that year was to abolish the state's Department of Environmental Protection, allegedly because of its role in efforts by the Sioux to block resource development in the Black Hills. Janklow supported passage of legislation to remove South Dakota's limit on interest rates. This attracted banks: for instance, Citibank opened a credit card center in Sioux Falls. Several states had similar laws, overturning previous policies against high rates. Under the federal banking rules, a state had to formally invite a bank into their state, and South Dakota invited Citibank before other states.

=== Reeves v. Stake ===
In 1980, Janklow argued Reeves, Inc. v. Stake before the U.S. Supreme Court. The case had been initiated while he was attorney general, and Janklow argued it because he was the attorney in South Dakota's government who was most familiar with the details. In arguing Reeves, Janklow became the first sitting governor to argue before the Supreme Court on behalf of his state.

Janklow was successful (5 to 4) in his argument that the state-owned cement plant could legally discriminate against out-of-state buyers in its pricing, which created the "market participant exception" to the U.S. Constitution's Dormant Commerce Clause.

=== Railroad revitalization ===
When the Milwaukee Railroad went into bankruptcy, Janklow called a special session of the legislature on the issue. The state purchased the main line of the defunct railroad. The state leased its property to the Burlington Northern, thereby preserving critical railway shipping of commodities for much of the state. Janklow increased accessibility for the disabled to public and private facilities in state.

=== U.S. Senate challenge ===
Barred by state law from running again in 1986 for governor, Janklow challenged the incumbent U.S. Senator James Abdnor in the Republican primary. Janklow lost, with Abdnor winning by a 55 percent to 45 percent margin. The primary battle was considered to weaken Abdnor, contributing to the latter's loss in the general election to Democrat Tom Daschle, then South Dakota's lone member of the U.S. House of Representatives.

== Second period as Governor of South Dakota ==
Janklow returned to politics in 1994, when he defeated incumbent Walter Dale Miller in the Republican gubernatorial primary. He was handily elected that year and was reelected in 1998. In his second two terms, he cut property taxes for homeowners and farmers by 30 percent, but was able to make up the revenue loss caused by the voters' repealing the inheritance tax.

Janklow is the longest-serving governor in South Dakota history. He was at the time the only person in the state's history to serve eight full years as governor, which he did twice. Since then, his record has been equaled by Mike Rounds, who served two full terms as governor from 2003 to 2011, and Dennis Daugaard, who served from 2011 to 2019.

=== Pardons ===
The Associated Press, in conjunction with the Sioux Falls newspaper Argus Leader, filed a request to obtain information on pardons granted by Janklow between 1995 and 2002. This request was under the state law that requires the release of records classified as public by the legislature when requested by an entity. Reporters found that the pardons did not follow the statutory process, which requires pardons to be reviewed by an independent commission. Among Janklow's pardons was one for his son-in-law for convictions for drunk driving and marijuana possession.

== U.S. House of Representatives and killing of Randy Scott ==
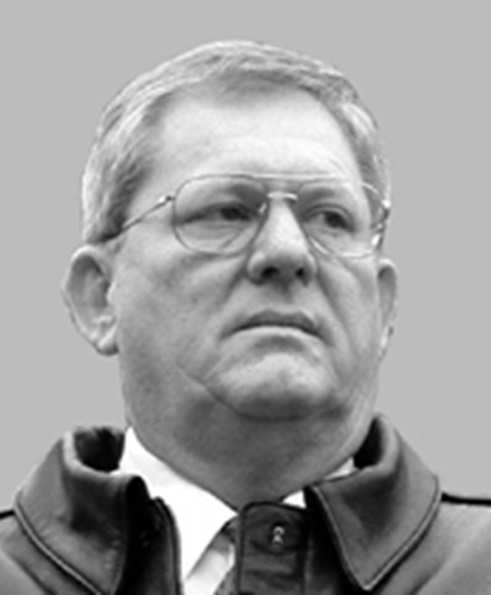
From 2003's Congressional Pictorial Directory of the 108th Congress

In 2002, Janklow ran for the Republican nomination for South Dakota's only House seat. He defeated the Democratic candidate, Stephanie Herseth, an attorney, by a vote of 180,023 (53%) to 153,656 (46%).

=== Vehicular manslaughter ===
On August 16, 2003, Janklow was involved in a fatal traffic collision while driving his car, when he failed to stop at an intersection near Trent, South Dakota. Janklow ran through a stop sign, and collided with motorcyclist Randy Scott. Scott, a 55-year-old Minnesotan, was thrown from his motorcycle and killed instantly. Janklow's vehicle traveled 300 feet beyond the point of impact and hit a sign in a field. He suffered a broken hand and bleeding on the brain. In the ensuing investigation, officials determined Janklow was driving at least 70 miles per hour in a 55 mph zone and that he ran a stop sign at the intersection where the crash occurred.

Janklow was arraigned on August 29, and said he "couldn't be sorrier" for the crash. His trial began on December 1. In his defense, his lawyer said that he suffered a bout of hypoglycemia, or low blood sugar, and was "confused" and "mixed up". Janklow testified that he had taken an insulin shot the morning of the crash and had not eaten anything throughout the day. Medical witnesses said this could result in low blood sugar, which might cause disorientation.

Robert O'Shea, an accident reconstruction expert, testified that he estimated the Congressman's speed to be 63 or 64 miles per hour at the time of impact, judging from details from the electronic data recorder of the Cadillac and "his own analysis". The State Highway Patrol investigator had said in testimony that he estimated Janklow's speed as "at least 70 mph". From his analysis, O'Shea said Scott's motorcycle's speed may have been as much as 65 mph; this was in contrast to the Highway Patrol's estimate of 59.

Most of Janklow's previous driving record was suppressed at the trial, but the superintendent of the state highway patrol reported publicly that Janklow had 16 traffic stops during his last term as governor for which he was not ticketed, out of both "respect for his authority" and a "fear of retribution". From 1990 to 1994, Janklow had 12 speeding tickets, with fines totaling $1000. Two troopers were allowed to testify that they had stopped Janklow for speed in excess of 80 miles per hour while driving on rural roads, but had opted to issue him written warnings rather than traffic citations.

On December 8, 2003, Janklow was convicted by a Moody County jury of second-degree manslaughter, a felony, as well as the misdemeanors of speeding, running a stop sign, and reckless driving. A month later, he resigned his seat in Congress effective January 20, 2004.

On January 22, Janklow was sentenced to spend 100 days in jail. After 30 days, he was able to leave the jail for several hours each day in order to perform community service. He was released on May 17, 2004.

Scott's family sued Janklow for damages, but the court ruled that because Janklow was on official business at the time, he was protected from any monetary claims by the Federal Tort Claims Act. This ascribes liability to the government as opposed to the individual who is acting in a governmental capacity. In July 2006, Scott's family filed a $25 million wrongful death suit against the U.S. government. The lawsuit was settled for $1 million on May 14, 2008.

== Controversies ==
=== Jancita Eagle Deer ===
In 1974, a month before the election for state attorney general for which Janklow was a candidate, Jancita Eagle Deer filed a petition through her attorney Larry Leventhal and tribal advocate Dennis Banks to disbar Janklow to keep him from practicing in tribal court. According to Banks, in early 1967, Eagle Deer, then a 15-year-old Lakota schoolgirl at the Rosebud Boarding School on the Rosebud Indian Reservation, reported to her school principal that Janklow, her legal guardian and for whom she was working as a babysitter, had raped her on January 13.

The Bureau of Indian Affairs (BIA), then responsible for law enforcement on the reservation, allegedly sent the police investigation case file of the rape (for which it had custody) to its Aberdeen, South Dakota office to keep it away from the Rosebud Sioux Tribal Court.

Judge Mario Gonzalez of the Rosebud Indian Reservation tribal court granted Eagle Deer's petition to disbar Janklow from practicing law on the Rosebud Reservation. At the request of Eagle Deer's attorneys, the tribal court "issued a misdemeanor arrest warrant for Janklow based on sworn testimony on Eagle Deer's behalf (since it was generally believed at the time that tribal courts had jurisdiction over non-Indians)", but no arrest was made. Janklow denied all allegations connected with the rape case, and no criminal charges were filed.

In 1975, Janklow was investigated by the FBI before being nominated as a candidate for appointment to the board of the Legal Services Corporation. The White House Counsel under President Gerald Ford forwarded its recommendation to the Senate Judiciary Committee, saying its investigation of the rape case concluded there was insufficient evidence. Ford's appointment of Janklow, to LSC's board as its first president was later confirmed by the Senate.

In April 1975, Jancita Eagle Deer was killed at night in a hit-and-run collision in southern Nebraska. After her death, Jancita's step-mother, Delphine Eagle Deer, sister of Leonard Crow Dog, advocated on the young woman's behalf. Delphine Eagle Deer was murdered in a still-unsolved case about nine months later in 1976.

=== Libel suits ===
In the 1980s, Janklow filed libel suits against the author Peter Matthiessen and Viking Press for a statement included in the book In the Spirit of Crazy Horse (1983), and another suit against Newsweek magazine for its coverage of the alleged rape. The publications had included statements of Dennis Banks, founder and leader of the American Indian Movement (AIM). In each case, the courts upheld the freedom of speech principle for the authors and publishers under the First Amendment.

Matthiessen included a statement by Banks about the rape accusation, as well as allegations that during the same period, Janklow had been arrested on the Rosebud reservation for driving drunk and shooting pet dogs. Janklow, by then serving as governor, sued both the author and publisher Viking Press for libel, which delayed publication of the paperback version of the book until 1992. Janklow's complaint, referring to the statement by Banks about rape, "cited a 1975 letter from Philip Buchen, head of the Office of Counsel to the President of the United States, to the Senate Committee on Labor and Public Welfare, saying that three Federal investigations found the allegations against him 'simply unfounded.' The Senate committee was considering Mr. Janklow's nomination as a director of the Legal Services Corporation..."

Janklow's suits were dismissed based on First Amendment protection of free speech. He filed a libel suit against Newsweek based on an article in the weekly's February 21, 1983, issue that included the disputed passage by Dennis Banks. Janklow v. Newsweek Inc. (1986), was brought before the United States Court of Appeals for the Eighth Circuit en banc appealing the decision of the Hon. John B. Jones, United States District Judge for the District of South Dakota, that Newsweek magazine had not defamed Janklow. The lower court's decision was affirmed by the appeals court, with BOWMAN, Circuit Judge, joined by ROSS and FAGG, Circuit Judges, dissenting.

== Post-political career ==
After January 5, 2006 (effective February 2006), when the South Dakota Supreme Court granted his petition for early reinstatement of his license to practice law, Janklow worked as an attorney. In spring 2006, the Mayo Clinic retained him to lobby against the DM&E Railroad expansion. He also represented landowners who were seeking reimbursement from the railroad for the taking of their property.

== Death and legacy ==
On November 4, 2011, Janklow announced during a press conference that he had terminal brain cancer. He died at a hospice care facility in Sioux Falls on January 12, 2012, aged 72. Governor Dennis Daugaard ordered that flags across the state be flown at half staff. Janklow is buried at Sturgis, South Dakota's Black Hills National Cemetery, Section I, Site 127.

== See also ==
- List of American federal politicians convicted of crimes
- List of federal political scandals in the United States

Legal offices
| Preceded by Kermit A. Sande | Attorney General of South Dakota; 1975–1979 | Succeeded by Mark V. Meierhenry |
Party political offices
| Preceded by Ron Schmidt | Republican nominee for Attorney General of South Dakota; 1974 | Succeeded by Mark V. Meierhenry |
| Preceded by John E. Olson | Republican nominee for Governor of South Dakota; 1978, 1982 | Succeeded by George Mickelson |
| Preceded by George Mickelson | Republican nominee for Governor of South Dakota; 1994, 1998 | Succeeded by Mike Rounds |
Political offices
| Preceded by Harvey Wollman | Governor of South Dakota; 1979–1987 | Succeeded by George Mickelson |
| Preceded by Walter Miller | Governor of South Dakota; 1995–2003 | Succeeded by Mike Rounds |
U.S. House of Representatives
| Preceded by John Thune | Member of the U.S. House of Representatives from South Dakota's at-large congressional district 2003–2004 | Succeeded by Stephanie Herseth Sandlin |
