= Wood, South Dakota =

- Town
- Location in Mellette County and the state of South Dakota
- Coordinates: 43°29′55″N 100°28′49″W
- Country: United States
- State: South Dakota
- County: Mellette
- Incorporated: 1929

Area
  - Total: 0.25 sq mi (0.64 km^{2})
  - Land: 0.25 sq mi (0.64 km^{2})
  - Water: 0 sq mi (0.00 km^{2})
- Elevation: 2,146 ft (654 m)

Population (2020)
  - Total: 41
  - Density: 166.6/sq mi (64.33/km^{2})
- Time zone: UTC-6 (Central (CST))
  - Summer (DST): UTC-5 (CDT)
- ZIP code: 57585
- Area code: 605
- FIPS code: 46-72620
- GNIS feature ID: 1267661

Wood is a town in Mellette County, South Dakota, United States. The population was 41 at the 2020 census.

== Geography ==
According to the United States Census Bureau, the town has a total area of 0.25 square miles (0.65 km^{2}), all land.

=== Climate ===
Climate data for Wood, South Dakota (1991–2020 normals, extremes 1913–present)
Month	Jan	Feb	Mar	Apr	May	Jun	Jul	Aug	Sep	Oct	Nov	Dec	Year
Record high °F (°C)	76 (24)	78 (26)	90 (32)	97 (36)	107 (42)	112 (44)	116 (47)	114 (46)	111 (44)	98 (37)	88 (31)	76 (24)	116 (47)
Mean maximum °F (°C)	59.0 (15.0)	63.0 (17.2)	76.5 (24.7)	83.1 (28.4)	89.5 (31.9)	94.6 (34.8)	101.8 (38.8)	100.3 (37.9)	96.9 (36.1)	87.3 (30.7)	74.0 (23.3)	61.2 (16.2)	103.2 (39.6)
Mean daily maximum °F (°C)	33.9 (1.1)	37.5 (3.1)	48.0 (8.9)	58.0 (14.4)	68.8 (20.4)	79.4 (26.3)	87.5 (30.8)	86.2 (30.1)	77.7 (25.4)	62.3 (16.8)	48.0 (8.9)	36.6 (2.6)	60.3 (15.7)
Daily mean °F (°C)	22.5 (−5.3)	25.4 (−3.7)	35.1 (1.7)	44.9 (7.2)	56.2 (13.4)	66.7 (19.3)	73.8 (23.2)	72.1 (22.3)	63.0 (17.2)	48.6 (9.2)	35.5 (1.9)	25.4 (−3.7)	47.4 (8.6)
Mean daily minimum °F (°C)	11.1 (−11.6)	13.2 (−10.4)	22.3 (−5.4)	31.8 (−0.1)	43.6 (6.4)	54.1 (12.3)	60.1 (15.6)	57.9 (14.4)	48.4 (9.1)	34.9 (1.6)	23.1 (−4.9)	14.3 (−9.8)	34.6 (1.4)
Mean minimum °F (°C)	−12.5 (−24.7)	−8.6 (−22.6)	0.0 (−17.8)	15.2 (−9.3)	28.9 (−1.7)	42.1 (5.6)	48.8 (9.3)	45.7 (7.6)	32.7 (0.4)	17.4 (−8.1)	3.8 (−15.7)	−7.9 (−22.2)	−18.2 (−27.9)
Record low °F (°C)	−35 (−37)	−36 (−38)	−29 (−34)	−7 (−22)	16 (−9)	28 (−2)	28 (−2)	34 (1)	11 (−12)	−7 (−22)	−22 (−30)	−32 (−36)	−36 (−38)
Average precipitation inches (mm)	0.43 (11)	0.64 (16)	1.21 (31)	2.42 (61)	3.36 (85)	3.50 (89)	2.42 (61)	1.94 (49)	1.82 (46)	1.55 (39)	0.69 (18)	0.51 (13)	20.49 (520)
Average snowfall inches (cm)	7.1 (18)	8.4 (21)	9.2 (23)	8.6 (22)	0.0 (0.0)	0.0 (0.0)	0.0 (0.0)	0.0 (0.0)	0.0 (0.0)	2.1 (5.3)	6.5 (17)	8.4 (21)	50.3 (128)
Average precipitation days (≥ 0.01 in)	5.0	5.5	6.6	9.6	11.4	10.7	8.6	7.7	6.4	6.8	5.1	5.4	88.8
Average snowy days (≥ 0.1 in)	3.8	4.0	3.5	2.3	0.0	0.0	0.0	0.0	0.0	0.9	2.8	4.5	21.8
Source: NOAA

== Demographics ==
Historical population
Census	Pop.	Note	%±
1930	257		—
1940	414		61.1%
1950	260		−37.2%
1960	267		2.7%
1970	132		−50.6%
1980	134		1.5%
1990	73		−45.5%
2000	66		−9.6%
2010	62		−6.1%
2020	41		−33.9%
U.S. Decennial Census

=== 2010 census ===
As of the census of 2010, there were 62 people, 29 households, and 15 families residing in the town. The population density was 248.0 inhabitants per square mile (95.8/km^{2}). There were 33 housing units at an average density of 132.0 per square mile (51.0/km^{2}). The racial makeup of the town was 72.6% White, 8.1% Native American, 3.2% Asian, and 16.1% from two or more races. Hispanic or Latino people of any race were 1.6% of the population.

There were 29 households, of which 31.0% had children under the age of 18 living with them, 27.6% were married couples living together, 17.2% had a female householder with no husband present, 6.9% had a male householder with no wife present, and 48.3% were non-families. 44.8% of all households were made up of individuals, and 24.1% had someone living alone who was 65 years of age or older. The average household size was 2.14 and the average family size was 2.93.

The median age in the town was 42.5 years. 25.8% of residents were under the age of 18; 6.4% were between the ages of 18 and 24; 21% were from 25 to 44; 22.5% were from 45 to 64; and 24.2% were 65 years of age or older. The gender makeup of the town was 50.0% male and 50.0% female.

=== 2000 census ===
As of the census of 2000, there were 66 people, 30 households, and 18 families residing in the town. The population density was 274.6 inhabitants per square mile (106.0/km^{2}). There were 38 housing units at an average density of 158.1 per square mile (61.0/km^{2}). The racial makeup of the town was 68.18% White, 28.79% Native American, and 3.03% from two or more races.

There were 30 households, out of which 20.0% had children under the age of 18 living with them, 46.7% were married couples living together, 10.0% had a female householder with no husband present, and 36.7% were non-families. 30.0% of all households were made up of individuals, and 16.7% had someone living alone who was 65 years of age or older. The average household size was 2.20 and the average family size was 2.79.

In the town, the population was spread out, with 21.2% under the age of 18, 1.5% from 18 to 24, 37.9% from 25 to 44, 15.2% from 45 to 64, and 24.2% who were 65 years of age or older. The median age was 39 years. For every 100 females, there were 88.6 males. For every 100 females age 18 and over, there were 92.6 males.

The median income for a household in the town was $27,083, and the median income for a family was $29,375. Males had a median income of $25,313 versus $21,458 for females. The per capita income for the town was $11,070. There were 16.7% of families and 23.9% of the population living below the poverty line, including 23.8% of under eighteens and 50.0% of those over 64.

== History ==
Wood was laid out in 1910 by Albert Kirk Wood, and named after him. In 1911, the community was formally organised a few miles north of his original trading post and within just two years, Wood had acquired a newspaper, a bank and daily mail service.

== Notable people ==
- James Abourezk (1931–2023) – first Arab-American to serve in the United States Senate
- Moses Stranger Horse (1890–1941) – Brulé Lakota artist
