= Harvey Wollman =

American politician (1935–2022)

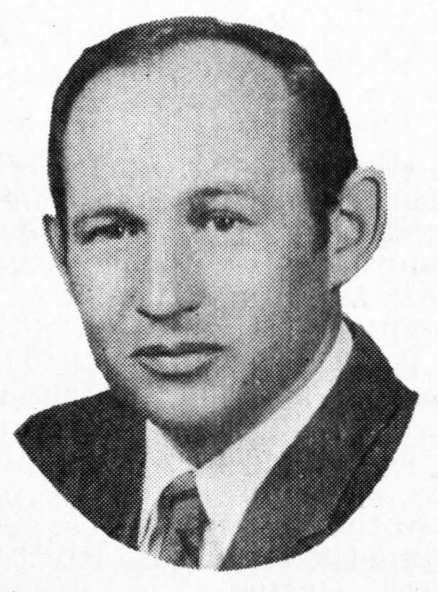

26th Governor of South Dakota
- In office July 24, 1978 – January 1, 1979
- Preceded by: Richard F. Kneip
- Succeeded by: Bill Janklow

32nd Lieutenant Governor of South Dakota
- In office January 1975 – July 24, 1978
- Governor: Richard F. Kneip
- Preceded by: William Dougherty
- Succeeded by: Lowell C. Hansen II

Personal details
- Born: Harvey Lowell Wollman; May 14, 1935 Frankfort, South Dakota, U.S.
- Died: October 18, 2022 (aged 87) Huron, South Dakota, U.S.
- Party: Democratic
- Spouse: Ann Geigel Wollman
- Children: 3
- Relatives: Roger Wollman (brother)
- Education: Bethel University; Huron University (BA); University of South Dakota

Harvey Lowell Wollman (May 14, 1935 – October 18, 2022) was an American politician who served as the 26th governor of South Dakota from 1978 to 1979. He was the first lieutenant governor in the history of South Dakota to succeed to the governorship. To date, he is the most recent Democrat to serve as South Dakota's governor.

== Early life ==
Wollman was born on May 14, 1935, in Frankfort, South Dakota. His parents were Edwin J. Wollman (1907–1981) and Katherine (née Kleinsasser) Wollman (1905–2002). He graduated from Doland High School in 1953. From 1954 to 1955, he attended Bethel College at St. Paul, Minnesota. From 1956 to 1957, he attended Huron College before serving in the U.S. Army from 1958 to 1960. In 1961, he completed a Bachelor of Arts from Huron College. From 1961 to 1965, he served as a teacher at Doland High School. In 1965, he completed graduate work at the University of South Dakota before becoming a farmer.

== Career ==
Wollman was the chairman of the Spink County Democratic Party. He ran for the South Dakota State Senate in 1966, but lost to Herb Heidepreim. Wollman ran again in 1968 and won a rematch against Heidepreim. He was re-elected in 1970. After the 1970 election, he was elected as minority leader. He was first elected lieutenant governor in 1974, on a ticket with Governor Richard F. Kneip.

In 1978, Wollman ran for the Democratic nomination for governor. He lost the primary election to State Senator Roger D. McKellips on June 8. Governor Kneip resigned to accept an appointment as United States Ambassador to Singapore, and Wollman succeeded him as governor on July 24, 1978. Wollman was sworn in as governor by his brother, Roger Leland Wollman, who was serving at the time as Chief Justice of the South Dakota Supreme Court.

Wollman served as governor until January 1, 1979. While he was in office, he worked to speed the repeal of the state property tax and increase the budget for higher education. He was succeeded by Republican Bill Janklow (who defeated McKellips in the general election).

Wollman remained interested in politics, saying that he did not want to run for governor in 1982, but was looking into running for the United States Senate in the 1984 election. He decided instead to run for his old seat in the state senate in 1984 with an eye on running for governor in the 1986 election. He lost to Mary McClure, the incumbent Republican, in the election.

== Personal life and death ==
Wollman married Ann Geigel and they had two sons, Michael and Daniel, and one daughter, Kristine.

Wollman died in Huron, South Dakota on October 18, 2022, at the age of 87.

== Legacy ==
Wollman's family originated from Russia and is of German descent. He was a member of the Ebenezer Mennonite Brethren Church (which closed its doors in the mid-1990s).

Party political offices
Preceded by William Dougherty	Democratic nominee for Lieutenant Governor of South Dakota; 1974	Succeeded by Billie Sutton
Political offices
Preceded by William Dougherty	Lieutenant Governor of South Dakota; 1975–1978	Succeeded by Lowell C. Hansen II
Preceded by Richard F. Kneip	Governor of South Dakota; 1978–1979	Succeeded by Bill Janklow
