= Probush.com =

Website created in the aftermath of 9/11 to support president George W. Bush

ProBush.com was created by Michael and Benjamin Marino, brothers from the U.S. state of Pennsylvania. Amidst heightened tension in the years following September 11th, the two brothers felt compelled to create a webpage which offered unconditional support of the 43rd US President, George W. Bush.

ProBush.com listed many celebrities and public personalities as "traitors" on its infamous "Traitor List". This led to a multimillion-dollar lawsuit in 2003 which lasted several years, and included former US Senator James Abourezk, Roxanne Dunbar-Ortiz, and Jane Fonda. Todd Epp of South Dakota was said to be the driving force behind the hotbed issue of free speech that had been created.

Others included on the list were Susan Sarandon, Nancy Pelosi, Madonna, and Ray Wirth.

The lawsuit lasted several years and ultimately ended in an undisclosed settlement.
