= Gordon Mydland =

American politician (1922–2022)

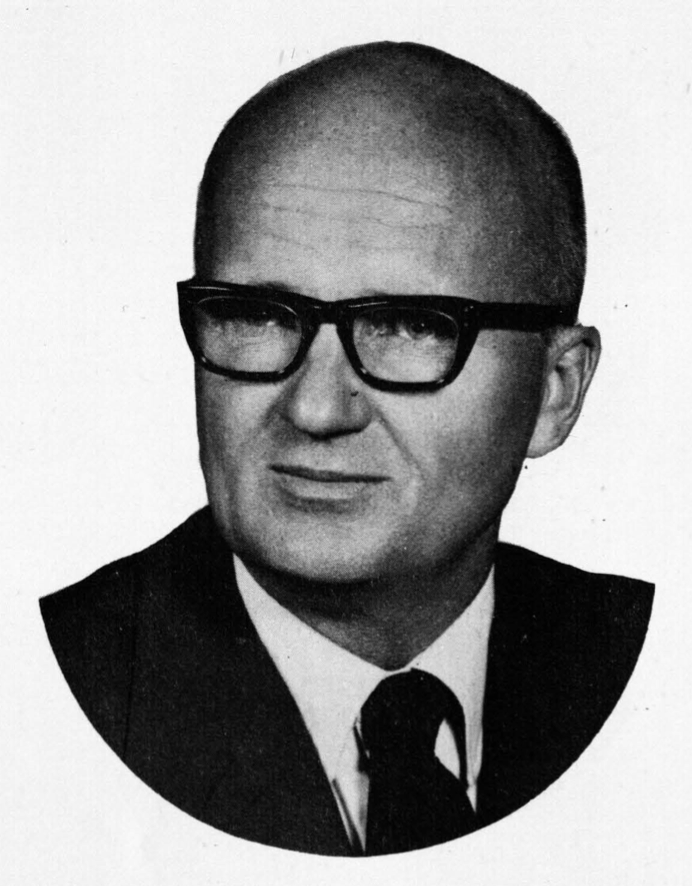

Member of the South Dakota Senate from the 13th, 6th district
- In office 1963–1968

23rd Attorney General of South Dakota
- In office 1969–1973
- Governor: Frank Farrar; Richard F. Kneip
- Preceded by: Frank Farrar
- Succeeded by: Kermit A. Sande

Circuit Court Judge

Personal details
- Born: May 12, 1922 near Hetland, South Dakota, U.S.
- Died: October 6, 2022 (aged 100) Brookings, South Dakota, U.S.
- Party: Republican
- Spouse: Lorrie Grange (m. 1958; died 2000)
- Children: 1
- Education: University of South Dakota (BS, JD)
- Occupation: Attorney

Gordon James Mydland (May 12, 1922 – October 6, 2022) was an American attorney and politician who served as the Attorney General of South Dakota. He was also a state senator, and a circuit court judge.

== Early life and education ==
Mydland was born on a farm near Hetland, South Dakota, on May 12, 1922. He attended South Dakota State University for a Bachelor of Science degree and the University of South Dakota School of Law for his LL.B degree.

== Career ==
Prior to his election to the state senate, he was the County Attorney for Brookings County, South Dakota. He served in the South Dakota State Senate from 1963 to 1968 representing the 13th district (1963–66) and the 6th district (1967–68). He was also Attorney General of South Dakota from 1969 to 1973. He was later a judge on the South Dakota Third Judicial Circuit.

On April 10, 1968, Mydland was the fourth candidate for the Republican nomination for Attorney General. He joined previously announced candidates Walter Andre, Michael Strain both of Pierre and assistant attorneys general and Tony Wiesensee an attorney from Canton. On July 16, 1968, at the Republican Convention, Mydland defeated Michael Strain by a vote of 82,946 to 48,764; Andre and Wiesensee removed themselves from the race before the voting began. Mydland was elected as Attorney General by defeating Democrat James Abourezk in 1968. Gordon received 148,366 (55.69%) votes; James received 118,045 (44.31%) votes.

Mydland was challenged for re-nomination by Ron Schmidt of Pierre. Mydland prevailed with 118,446 1/2 votes to Schmidt receiving 42,542 1/2 votes. Mydland was re-elected in 1970 by defeating Democrat Ramon Roubideaux. Gordon received 116,493 (50.40%) votes; Ramon received 114,633 (49.60%) votes.

Mydland ran for the US Senate. In the primary, Mydland finished 2nd to Robert Hirsch, but Hirsch did not get the required 35% of the vote to win the nomination, so the nomination was decided by the South Dakota Republican Convention. Secretary of State Alma Larson endorsed Mydland for the nomination runoff. Ultimately, Robert Hirsch was nominated by the convention for the US Senate, but he lost to Democrat James Abourezk in the general election.

In 1977, Mydland was appointed to be a Circuit Court judge for the 3rd Judicial Circuit, where he served until his retirement in 1987.

== Personal life and death ==
Mydland was a Lutheran. He married Lorrie Grange in 1958 and had one son, John Gabriel Mydland. He turned 100 in May 2022, and died on October 6, 2022, in Brookings, South Dakota. He served in the United States Navy during World War II.

Party political offices
Preceded by Frank Farrar	Republican nominee for Attorney General of South Dakota; 1968, 1970	Succeeded by Ron Schmidt
Legal offices
Preceded by Frank Farrar	Attorney General of South Dakota; 1969–1973	Succeeded by Kermit A. Sande
