= Patricia Farrar =

American educator

First Lady of South Dakota
- In role January 7, 1969 – January 5, 1971
- Governor: Frank Farrar
- Preceded by: Vacant (1965–1969)
- Succeeded by: Nancy Kneip Paprocki

Personal details
- Born: Patricia Jean Henley; August 13, 1931 Britton, South Dakota
- Died: October 31, 2015 (aged 84) Aberdeen, South Dakota
- Spouse: Frank Farrar (m. 1953)
- Children: 5
- Education: University of South Dakota

Patricia Jean "Pat" Farrar (née Henley; August 13, 1931 – October 31, 2015) was an American educator. She was the First Lady of South Dakota from 1969 to 1971 during the administration of her husband, former Governor Frank Farrar. She was also on the board of advisers of the John F. Kennedy Center for the Performing Arts. Patricia Farrar won a gold medal at the National Senior Games, also known as the Senior Olympics, in 1989.

== Early life and education ==
Farrar was born Patricia Henley on August 13, 1931, in Britton, South Dakota, to Percy Denis and Margaret (née Schneider) Henley. She was raised in nearby Claremont, where she graduated as valedictorian from Claremont High School in 1949.

She graduated cum laude from the University of South Dakota in 1953, where she studied English and art. Henley placed first runner up in the Miss South Dakota pageant while in college. She began her career as a teacher at Summit High School in Summit, South Dakota.

== Career ==
Farrar was the First Lady of South Dakota from 1969 to 1971. She was also a member of the South Dakota Commission on the Status of Women, as well as the South Dakota State University's advisory board for apparel and textiles. Nationally, Farrar held a seat on the board of advisers for the John F. Kennedy Center for the Performing Arts in Washington, D.C. She wrote and performed a chautauqua based on the life of South Dakota's first First Lady, Margaret Mellette.

In 1989, Farrar won a gold medal in race walking at the second National Senior Games in St. Louis, Missouri.

=== Death ===
Farrar died from Lewy body dementia and Parkinson's disease at Avera St. Luke's Hospital in Aberdeen, South Dakota, on October 31, 2015, at the age of 84. She was survived by her husband and their five children. Governor Dennis Daugaard ordered flags to be flown at half-staff on November 7, 2015, in her honor.

== Personal life ==
Henley married her husband, Frank Farrar, whom she had met at the University of South Dakota, on June 5, 1953, at Fort Benning, Georgia, where he was stationed in the U.S. Army at the time. They had five children, Jeanne, Sally, Robert, Mary and Anne.
