= Carveth Thompson =

American politician (1932–2021)

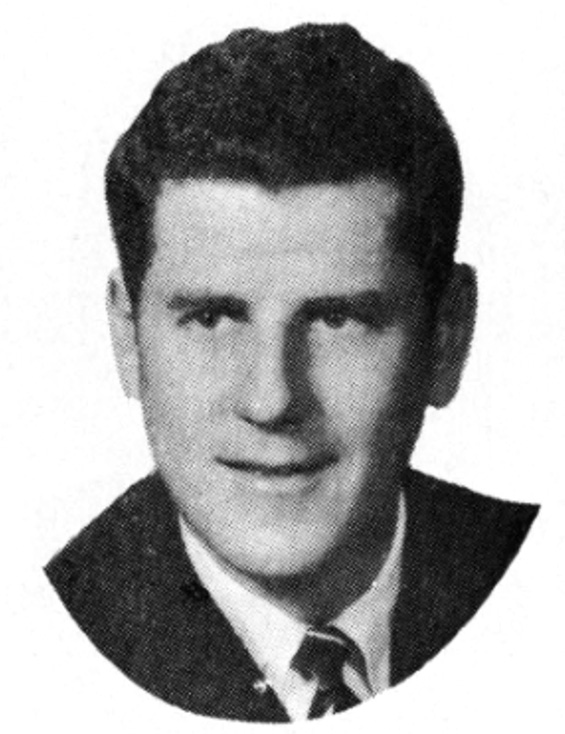

Member of the South Dakota House of Representatives from South Dakota's 10th district
- In office January 7, 1969 - January 2, 1973

Personal details
- Born: October 25, 1932 Faith, South Dakota
- Died: August 11, 2021 (aged 88) Omaha, Nebraska
- Party: Republican
- Spouse: Margaret King
- Children: Three
- Occupation: Businessman

Carveth "Carv" Thompson (October 25, 1932 – August 11, 2021) was an American politician in the state of South Dakota. A Republican, he served in the South Dakota House of Representatives from 1968 to 1972, and was the Republican nominee in 1972 South Dakota gubernatorial election. He was born in Faith, South Dakota.

Party political offices
Preceded by Frank Farrar	Republican nominee for Governor of South Dakota; 1972	Succeeded by John E. Olson
