= Robert Chamberlin =

American politician (1920–2013)

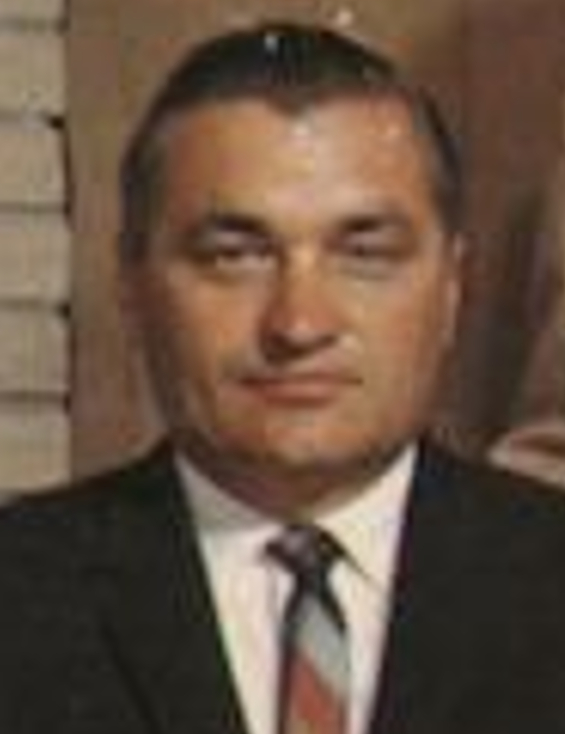

Member of the South Dakota House of Representatives from the 35th district
- In office 1955–1960

Personal details
- Born: June 7, 1920 Hecla, South Dakota, U.S.
- Died: September 10, 2013 (aged 93) Kernersville, North Carolina, U.S.
- Party: Democratic
- Spouse: Jane Dorothy Pope
- Children: Merritt Pope Chamberlin, Deborah Chamberlin Ahlman
- Education: University of Wisconsin

Robert Mather Chamberlin (June 7, 1920 – September 10, 2013) was an American politician in the state of South Dakota who was a member of the South Dakota House of Representatives from 1955 to 1964. Chamberlin was an alumnus of the University of Wisconsin and also attended the University of Southern California for his first two years of college on a baseball scholarship. He was a farmer/cattle rancher in Hecla, South Dakota and served as mayor of Hecla. He was also a former high school teacher in Orlando, Florida. He served in the Navy as a pilot during World War II in the Pacific earning a Silver Star. He also ran as a Democratic candidate for Governor of South Dakota in the 1966 and 1968 elections. He died in 2013, aged 93.

Party political offices
| Preceded by Mike Schirmer | Democratic nominee for Lieutenant Governor of South Dakota; 1964] | Succeeded by Ralph A. Nauman |
| Preceded by John F. Lindley | Democratic nominee for Governor of South Dakota; 1966, 1968 | Succeeded by Richard F. Kneip |
