= 1966 South Dakota gubernatorial election =

- November 8, 1966
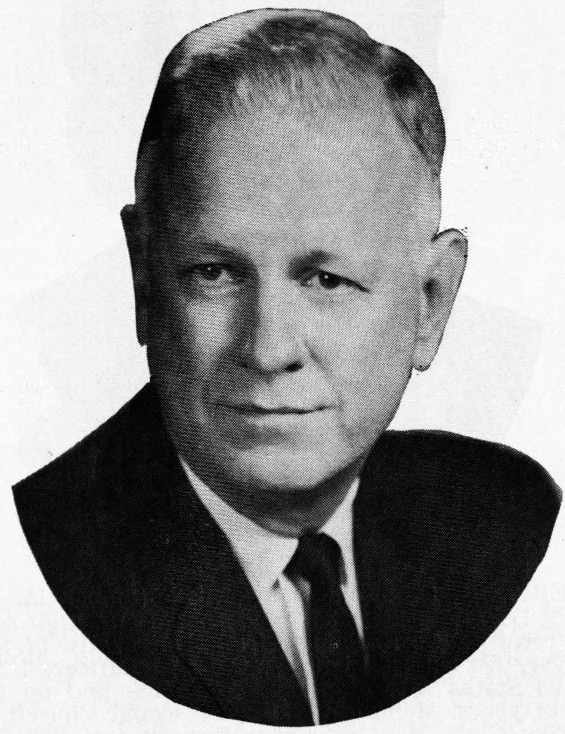

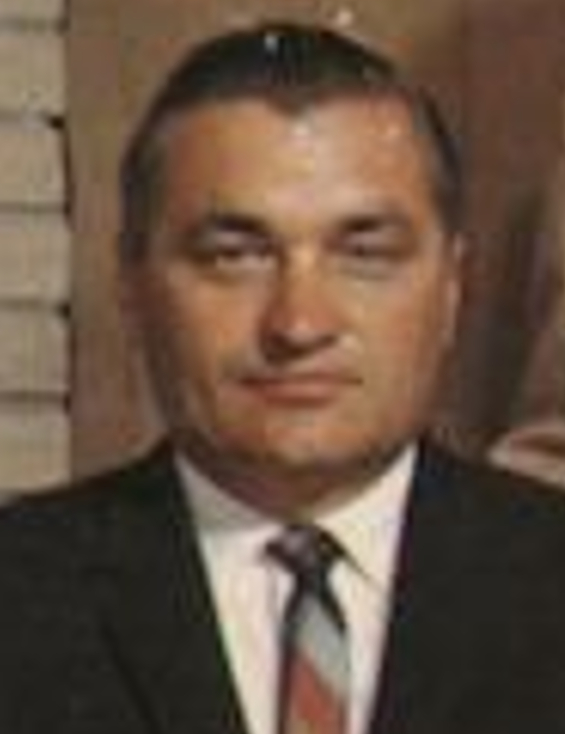
Nominee	Nils Boe	Robert Chamberlin
Party	Republican	Democratic
Popular vote	131,710	96,504
Percentage	57.71%	42.29%
- County results Boe: 50–60% 60–70% 70–80% 80–90% Chamberlin: 50–60%
Governor before election
Nils Boe
Republican
Elected Governor
Nils Boe
Republican

The 1966 South Dakota gubernatorial election was held on November 8, 1966.

Incumbent Republican Governor Nils Boe defeated Democratic nominee Robert Chamberlin with 57.71% of the vote.

== Primary elections ==
Primary elections were held on June 7, 1966.

=== Democratic primary ===
==== Candidates ====
- Robert Chamberlin, State Representative

==== Results ====
Democratic primary results
Party	Candidate	Votes	%
Democratic	Robert Chamberlin		unopposed

=== Republican primary ===
==== Candidates ====
- Nils Boe, incumbent Governor

==== Results ====
Republican primary results
Party	Candidate	Votes	%
Republican	Nils Boe (inc.)		unopposed

== General election ==
=== Candidates ===
- Robert Chamberlin, Democratic
- Nils Boe, Republican

=== Results ===
1966 South Dakota gubernatorial election
Party	Candidate	Votes	%	±%
Republican	Nils Boe (inc.)	131,710	57.71%	
Democratic	Robert Chamberlin	96,504	42.29%	
Majority		35,206	15.42%	
Turnout		228,214	100.00%	
Republican hold		Swing		

== Bibliography ==
- Gubernatorial Elections, 1787-1997. Washington, D.C.: Congressional Quarterly Inc. 1998. ISBN 1-56802-396-0.
- Scammon, Richard M., ed. (1968). America Votes 7: a handbook of contemporary American election statistics, 1966. Washington, D.C.: Governmental Affairs Institute.
