= Jancita Eagle Deer =

American Brulé Lakota rape victim

- Born: 1952; Rosebud Indian Reservation, South Dakota
- Died: April 4, 1975 (aged 22–23); Southern Nebraska

Jancita Eagle Deer (1952 – April 4, 1975) was a Brulé Lakota who lived on the Rosebud Indian Reservation in South Dakota. She was notable for accusing future governor William Janklow of having raped her in January 1967, when she was about 15 and he was a poverty lawyer and Director of the Rosebud Sioux Legal Services program on the reservation. She had worked as his babysitter.

The Bureau of Indian Affairs (BIA) and the Federal Bureau of Investigation (FBI) did not prosecute the case, although the alleged crime was within their jurisdiction.

In October 1974 Dennis Banks acted on her behalf as the tribal attorney to revive the charges. Janklow was then a candidate for state attorney general. Eagle Deer in 1974 did succeed in having Janklow disbarred from practicing in the Rosebud Sioux Tribal Court.

No federal charges were ever brought against Janklow in the alleged rape case. In 1975, he was appointed by President Gerald Ford to the national board of the Legal Services Corporation.

Eagle Deer died the night of April 4, 1975 in a purported hit-and-run accident in southern Nebraska. No one was prosecuted in the homicide. She had been seeing former American Indian Movement (AIM) activist Douglass Durham. He was discovered in late 1974 to be an FBI informant and expelled from AIM in March 1975.

Janklow was elected governor of South Dakota in 1978; he twice served tenures of two terms.

== Early life and education ==
Jancita Eagle Deer, a Brulé Lakota, was born in 1952 and grew up on the Rosebud Indian Reservation. She attended local schools, including the Rosebud Boarding School on the Reservation.

On January 14, 1967, Eagle Deer reported to her school principal that William Janklow, head of legal services at Rosebud, had raped her at gunpoint the night before. He had been driving her home from her work as his family's babysitter.

The principal took her to the hospital, where a doctor and nurse examined her. In his memoir years later, Dennis Banks, an AIM founder who became involved in the case in 1974, when he was working as tribal attorney, said his review of the records showed the medical personnel said the girl was in shock. He believed that she had been assaulted.

Because the alleged crime was within federal jurisdiction, the BIA police conducted the investigation on the reservation. The FBI did not think there was sufficient evidence to prosecute.

In his 2005 history of this period, journalist Steve Hendricks wrote that there was evidence of an assault, and noted that the case was not prosecuted.

== Later life ==
In the fall of 1974, Janklow was the Republican Party candidate for state attorney general. AIM leader and tribal attorney Dennis Banks encouraged Eagle Deer to testify to the tribal court about the rape case to try to gain justice. Anna Mae Aquash, another high-ranking AIM member, had located Eagle Deer in Iowa, where she had gone to escape rumors about the incident. Aquash persuaded the young woman to return to the Rosebud Reservation to testify.

Eagle Deer testified at court. Janklow failed to appear in response to a BIA summons served through a US Marshal. Eagle Deer filed a petition through her attorney Larry Leventhal and tribal attorney Dennis Banks, to disbar Janklow from the tribal court, to prevent him from practicing at the reservation.

In their 1998 book on this period, Mario Gonzales, who served as judge of the Tribal Court, and the writer Elizabeth Cook-Lynn said the BIA allegedly had sent the police investigation files of the rape charges to its Aberdeen, South Dakota office to keep it out of the hands of the Tribal Court. The tribal court issued two misdemeanor warrants against Janklow and granted Eagle Deer's petition to disbar Janklow from practicing law on the Rosebud Reservation.

No arrest was made, and Janklow denied all allegations connected with the rape case. The writer Peter Matthiessen included a statement by Banks on this issue in his book, In the Spirit of Crazy Horse (1983). Publication in paperback was delayed as Janklow sued both the author and publisher Viking Press for libel. His suits were finally dismissed by the federal courts because of protection of free speech under the Constitution's First Amendment.

In the fall of 1974, soon after her return to South Dakota, Jancita Eagle Deer started seeing Douglass Durham, an AIM activist. According to Banks' 2005 memoir, he was concerned about Durham's relationship with Eagle Deer, especially after Aquash told him that Durham was physically abusing the young woman. Banks said he confronted Durham about it and said he "should let her go."

Banks said that in late 1974, Vernon Bellecourt and Clyde Bellecourt, leaders of AIM, shared documentary evidence showing that Durham was an FBI informant. Banks had earlier appointed him as head of security for AIM.

Banks continued working with Durham for some time before he and other leaders confronted him and expelled him from AIM in February 1975. They held a press conference in March, at which Durham also spoke and admitted he was an FBI informant. Durham had participated in the Wounded Knee Incident on the Pine Ridge Indian Reservation and been closely involved with Banks and other leaders since then.

Jancita Eagle Deer continued to see Durham. On the night of April 14, 1975, she was struck and killed by a car while on a rural road in southern Nebraska, 200 miles from home. The journalist Hendricks wrote that she had last been seen in the company of Durham. Eagle Deer's brother said a man had picked her up from their family house that night. The coroner's report said she may have been beaten before the accident, or injured in being pushed out of another car before being hit, but because of her injuries, he could not tell for sure.

== After death ==
After Jancita Eagle Deer's death, her step-mother Delphine Eagle Deer tried to take up her case against Janklow. Delphine Eagle Deer was the sister of Leonard Crow Dog, a spiritual leader in AIM. About nine months later in 1976, Delphine Eagle Deer was found beaten to death on the Rosebud reservation.

According to Banks' memoir, she was beaten by an unnamed BIA policeman, who pleaded drunkenness in his defense and was not charged. The writer Hendricks referred to the case as an unsolved murder.

Janklow was later convicted of vehicular manslaughter for killing a motorcyclist in South Dakota in 2003. He died of terminal brain cancer on January 12, 2012.
