= Kermit A. Sande =

American politician from South Dakota (born 1943)

24th Attorney General of South Dakota
- In office 1973–1975

Personal details
- Born: February 23, 1943 Huron, South Dakota, U.S.
- Party: Democratic
- Education: South Dakota State University; University of South Dakota
- Occupation: lawyer

Kermit A. Sande (born February 23, 1943) is an American politician and attorney in the state of South Dakota. He served as Attorney General of South Dakota from 1973 to 1975, as a Democrat. He is the most recent Democrat to hold the office.

== Education and career ==
He attended South Dakota State University graduating in 1964 and University of South Dakota School of Law graduating in 1968. He was the Beadle County Attorney from 1970 to 1972.

== 1972 South Dakota Attorney General election ==
Sande defeated Leonard Andera of Chamberlain; Pat Kirby of Mitchell and John Keller of Chamberlain at the Democratic convention.

On April 5, 1972, Ron Schmidt announced he was running for the Republican nomination. Schmidt was nominated by the Republican party at its convention after an unsuccessful run for the nomination in 1970 against incumbent Attorney General Gordon Mydland. James Brennan of Rapid City had announced his candidacy but withdrew before the voting began.

Sande won the general election by defeating Republican Ron Schmidt. Sande received 152,835 (51.60%) votes and Ron received 143,367 (48.40%) votes.

== 1974 South Dakota Attorney General election ==
Sande was defeated in his bid for reelection by William J. Janklow, who had worked for Sande as an assistant attorney general. Janklow received 173,658 (66.66%) votes and Sande received 86,865 (33.34%) votes.

Legal offices
Preceded by Gordon Mydland	Attorney General of South Dakota; 1973–1975	Succeeded by William Janklow
