= Richard F. Kneip =

American politician

Richard Kneip
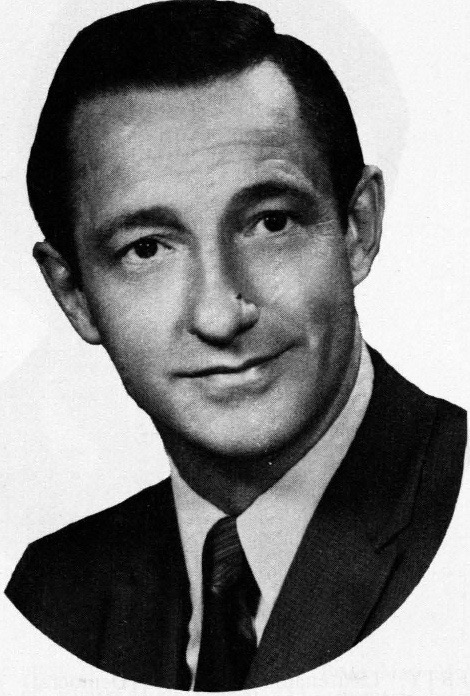

6th United States Ambassador to Singapore
- In office August 7, 1978 – September 25, 1980
- President: Jimmy Carter
- Preceded by: John H. Holdridge
- Succeeded by: Harry E. T. Thayer

25th Governor of South Dakota
- In office January 5, 1971 – July 24, 1978
- Lieutenant: William Dougherty; Harvey L. Wollman
- Preceded by: Frank Farrar
- Succeeded by: Harvey L. Wollman

Member of the South Dakota Senate
- In office 1965–1971

Personal details
- Born: January 7, 1933 Tyler, Minnesota, U.S.
- Died: March 9, 1987 (aged 54) Sioux Falls, South Dakota, U.S.
- Party: Democratic
- Spouse: Nancy Lou Pankey
- Education: South Dakota State University; St. John's College
- Profession: Businessman

Military service
- Branch/service: United States Air Force
- Years of service: 1951–1955

Richard Francis Kneip (January 7, 1933 – March 9, 1987) was an American diplomat and politician who served as the 25th governor of South Dakota from 1971 until 1978 and the 6th United States Ambassador to the Republic of Singapore. He was a member of the Democratic Party and the first Catholic Governor of South Dakota, he is the most recent Governor of South Dakota elected from the party, and the only Governor of his party to be elected more than twice.

== Early life and education ==
Kneip was born on January 7, 1933, in Tyler, Minnesota, to Berniece and Frank Kneip, who lived in Elkton, South Dakota. He was of Luxembourgish ancestry. He attended South Dakota State University and St. John's University. He served in the U.S. Air Force and then owned a wholesale dairy equipment distributorship in Salem, South Dakota. He married Nancy Lou Pankey.

== Early political career ==
He served in the South Dakota Legislature as a State Senator from 1965 to 1971.

== Governor of South Dakota ==
When Richard F. Kneip was elected governor of South Dakota in 1970, defeating the Republican incumbent Frank Farrar, he was only the fourth governor elected from the Democratic Party since statehood. Known to the state's voters as "Dick", Kneip gained popularity through his "people to people" campaigns. Kneip memorably did launch his 1970 campaign for governor with radio ads asking "What is a Kneip?".

Taking office two days shy of his 38th birthday, Kneip is the youngest governor the state has ever elected. Kneip and his wife, Nancy, moved into the governor's mansion, along with their eight sons.

Kneip's first term was noted for major reform efforts. He successfully overhauled the organization of state government by creating a cabinet system. Kneip was re-elected in 1972, and became the last governor of South Dakota to serve a two-year term. He twice served two-year terms and then was elected to a final four-year term in 1974. This made Kneip the first governor to be elected three times. Kneip appeared on the November 19, 1977, episode of Saturday Night Live as one of the five finalists in the show's "Anyone Can Host" contest, which was won by Miskel Spillman.

=== Educational efforts ===
Some of Kneip's most significant achievements was preventing the closure of South Dakota State University's now-J. Lohr School of Engineering and opening the four-year University of South Dakota School of Medicine.

== Wounded Knee Incident of 1973 ==
At the start of Kneip's second term in 1973, the state gained national attention because of a standoff between Native American activists and government agents at Wounded Knee, later known as the second Wounded Knee Incident.

== Foreign service ==
Kneip resigned as governor on July 24, 1978, a few months before the expiration of his third term. He had been selected by President Jimmy Carter to become the United States ambassador to Singapore.

== Death and legacy ==
Kneip sought to return to the governor's mansion in 1986, but he narrowly lost his party's nomination in the state Democratic Party primary to nominee Lars Herseth that June.

Although he had pondered yet another attempt at returning to public life, Kneip was diagnosed with cancer in early 1987. He died in Sioux Falls, South Dakota, on March 9, 1987, at the age of 54. He is the most recent Democrat elected to the Governorship of South Dakota.

In 1997, U.S. Highway 14 from Brookings to Elkton, was officially designated as the Richard Kneip Memorial Highway.

Party political offices
Preceded by Robert Chamberlin	Democratic nominee for Governor of South Dakota; 1970, 1972, 1974	Succeeded by Roger D. McKellips
Political offices
Preceded by Frank Farrar	Governor of South Dakota; 1971–1978	Succeeded by Harvey L. Wollman
Diplomatic posts
Preceded by John H. Holdridge	United States Ambassador to Singapore; 1978–1980	Succeeded by Harry E. T. Thayer
