= William Dougherty =

American politician

Bill Dougherty
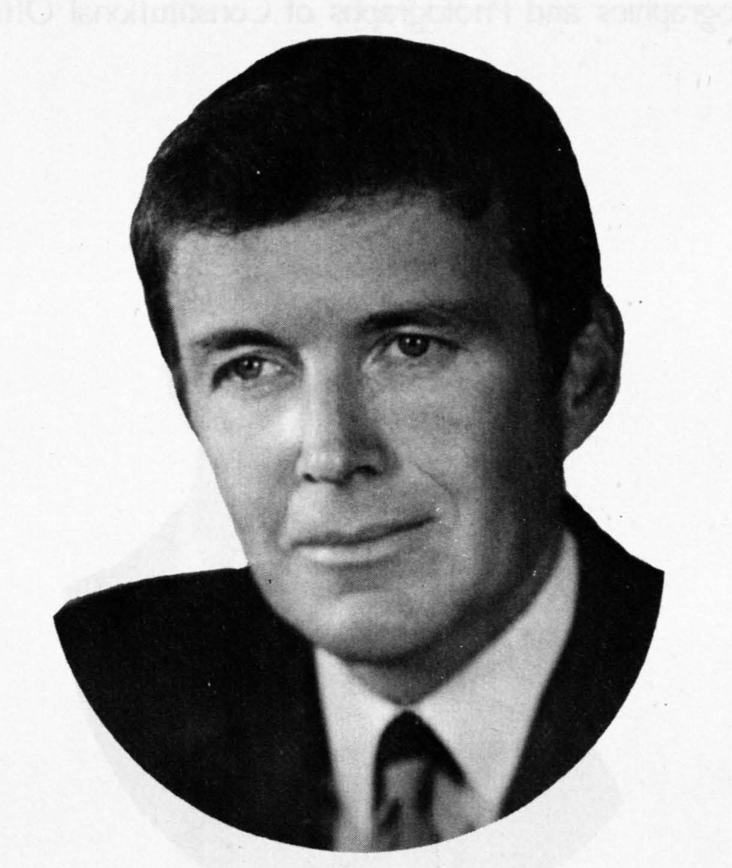

31st Lieutenant Governor of South Dakota
- In office January 1971 – January 1975
- Governor: Richard F. Kneip
- Preceded by: James Abdnor
- Succeeded by: Harvey L. Wollman

Personal details
- Born: April 6, 1932 Sioux Falls, South Dakota, U.S.
- Died: July 3, 2010 (aged 78) Sioux Falls, South Dakota, U.S.
- Party: Democratic
- Profession: Politician

William Dougherty (April 6, 1932 – July 3, 2010) was an American businessman, lobbyist, and Democratic politician who was the 31st Lieutenant Governor of South Dakota from 1971 to 1975.

== Early life and education ==
Dougherty graduated from South Dakota State University in 1954. Before entering politics, Dougherty spent many years in Sioux Falls, South Dakota, working as a stockman, buying and selling cattle. In the late 1950s, he befriended the Kennedy family, enabling his rise in politics.

== Political career ==
In 1960, he worked on Massachusetts Senator John F. Kennedy's presidential campaign, meeting Kennedy's brother, future Senator Ted Kennedy, during that campaign. Although John F. Kennedy won the presidency that year, the Republican nominee, Richard Nixon, won South Dakota's four electoral votes. In 1968, Dougherty managed New York Senator Robert F. Kennedy's South Dakota campaign for the Democratic nomination for the presidency; with Dougherty at the helm, Kennedy won the South Dakota primary on the same day he won the California primary. However, Kennedy was assassinated in Los Angeles, California that night; Dougherty had spoken to him on the telephone twice shortly before the assassination. One of those calls, in which Kennedy congratulated his South Dakotan supporters over a speaker phone, was taped by Dougherty and eventually preserved on a compact disc. Also in 1968, Dougherty managed freshman Democratic Senator George McGovern's successful re-election campaign.

Four years later, Dougherty held a major post in McGovern's unsuccessful campaign for the presidency. After receiving the Democratic nomination, McGovern replaced his running mate, Missouri Senator Thomas Eagleton, with former Ambassador to France Sargent Shriver of Maryland, after being urged to do so by Dougherty, among others.

In a 1973 book, Neil R. Peirce described his 1969 interview of Dougherty:

...With his lean figure, Western blue jeans, cowboy hat, and boots, he looks as if he would be more at home in a Marlboro cigarette ad than working closely with the sophisticated Kennedy clan of the old East. ... When I first interviewed Dougherty in 1969, I was amazed by his confidence that the South Dakota Democratic party of the 1970s could become consistently competitive with the GOP, building a coalition of farmers, college people, intellectual suburbanites, and labor and cutting down the Republican edge in the cities. The breakdown of South Dakota's insularity through television and travel was leading in that direction, Dougherty argued; he said his own attitudes on race were greatly altered by travel with Bobby Kennedy to the ghettos of the great cities and subsequently by the nine-hour ride on Bobby's funeral train from New York to Washington, watching impoverished blacks and others who lined the train platforms in 100-degree to honor their fallen hero.

Dougherty also served as a member of the Democratic National Committee; when he first joined the committee, he was, at the age of 36, its youngest member.

== Lieutenant governor ==
Dougherty was elected Lieutenant Governor of South Dakota in 1970, running on a ticket with State Senator Richard F. Kneip. Kneip and Dougherty were re-elected in 1972. In 1974, Dougherty unsuccessfully challenged Kneip for the Democratic nomination for governor, and then retired from public office. He was succeeded as lieutenant governor by Harvey L. Wollman in 1975.

== Lobbyist ==
After leaving public office, Dougherty launched a lengthy lobbying career in Pierre, the state capital. He became one of the state's best-known lobbyists; veteran state legislator Bernie Hunhoff has described Dougherty's lobbying career as "colorful." Dougherty spent a good deal of his career representing liquor and tobacco interests.

More recently, Dougherty represented the South Dakota Petroleum Marketers on a task force on open government put together by South Dakota Attorney General Larry Long. The task force reviewed statutory limits on public access to state and local government records. He retired from his lobbying career in 2009. He was inducted into the South Dakota Hall of Fame in September 2009.

In 2010, he died of cancer in Sioux Falls.

Party political offices
Preceded by George D. Blue	Democratic nominee for Lieutenant Governor of South Dakota; 1970, 1972]	Succeeded by Harvey Wollman
Political offices
Preceded by James Abdnor	Lieutenant Governor of South Dakota; 1971–1975	Succeeded by Harvey L. Wollman
