= 1916 South Dakota gubernatorial election =

- November 7, 1916
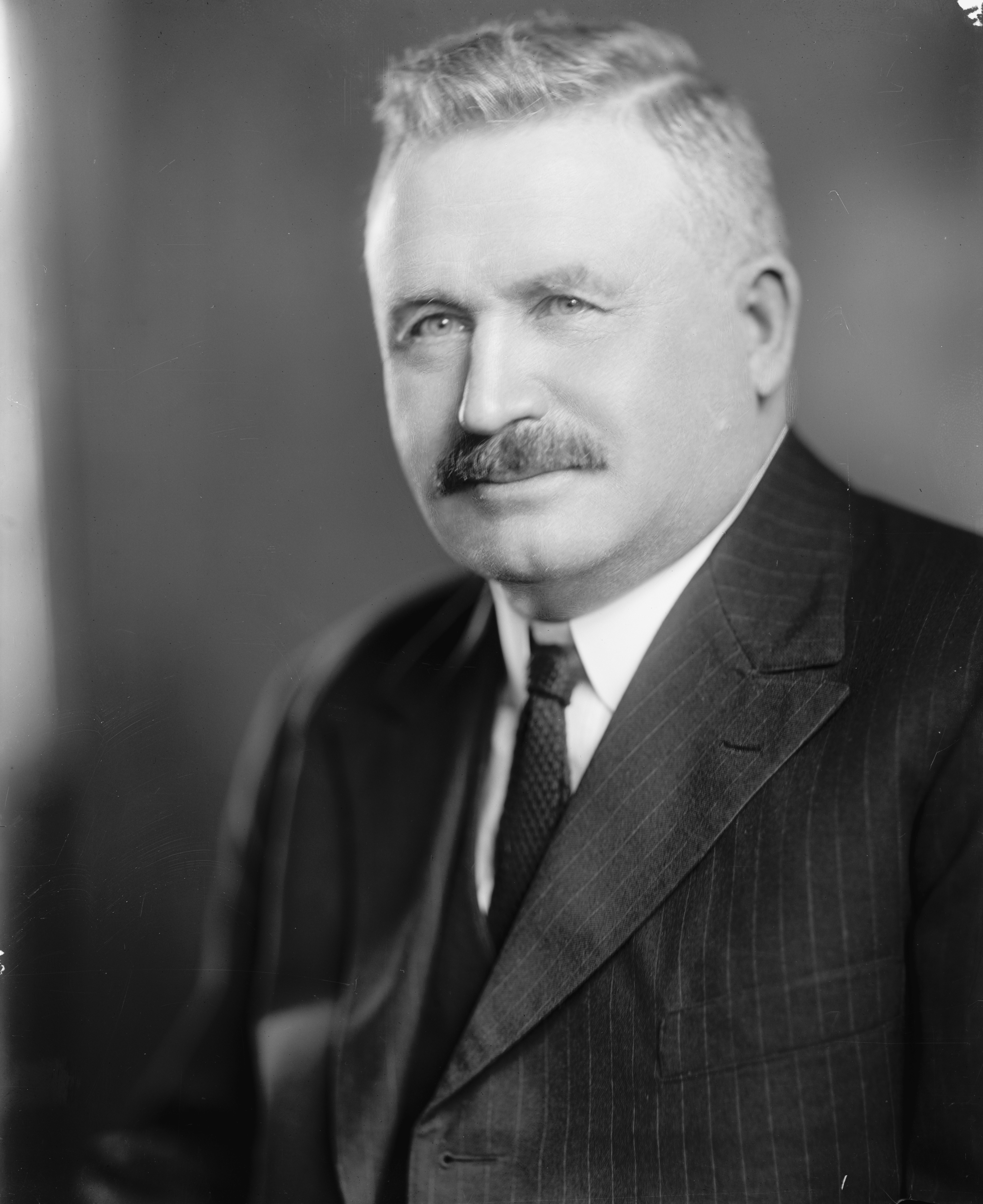

Nominee	Peter Norbeck	Orville V. Rinehart
Party	Republican	Democratic
Popular vote	72,789	50,545
Percentage	56.64%	39.33%
- County results Norbeck: 40–50% 50–60% 60–70% 70–80% 80–90% Rinehart: 40–50% 50–60% 70–80%
Governor before election
Frank M. Byrne
Republican
Elected Governor
Peter Norbeck
Republican

The 1916 South Dakota gubernatorial election was held on November 7, 1916. Incumbent Republican Governor Frank M. Byrne declined to seek re-election to a third term. Lieutenant Governor Peter Norbeck won the Republican primary to succeed him, and in the general election faced State Representative Orville V. Rinehart. Norbeck won his first term as Governor in a landslide over Rinehart.

== Primary elections ==
Primary elections were held on May 23, 1916.

=== Democratic primary ===
==== Candidates ====
- Orville V. Rinehart, former State Representative from Pennington County
- Edmund D. Morcom, businessman

==== Results ====
Democratic primary results
Party	Candidate	Votes	%
Democratic	Orville V. Rinehart	6,529	53.33%
Democratic	Edmund D. Morcom	5,714	46.67%
Total votes		12,243	100.00%

=== Republican primary ===
==== Candidates ====
- Peter Norbeck, Lieutenant Governor
- George W. Egan, disbarred attorney, 1912 Republican candidate for Governor, 1910 Republican candidate for Governor
- Richard Olsen Richards, perennial candidate

==== Results ====
Republican primary results
Party	Candidate	Votes	%
Republican	Peter Norbeck	31,987	59.37%
Republican	George W. Egan	11,442	21.24%
Republican	Richard O. Richards	10,449	19.39%
Total votes		53,878	100.00%

=== Prohibition primary ===
==== Candidates ====
- C. K. Thompson, Prohibition candidate for Governor in 1914

==== Results ====
Prohibition primary results
Party	Candidate	Votes	%
Prohibition	C. K. Thompson	526	100.00%
Total votes		526	100.00%

=== Socialist primary ===
==== Candidates ====
- Fred L. Fairchild, Socialist candidate for South Dakota's 3rd congressional district in 1914

==== Results ====
Socialist primary results
Party	Candidate	Votes	%
Socialist	Fred L. Fairchild	699	100.00%
Total votes		699	100.00%

== General election ==
=== Candidates ===
- Orville V. Rinehart, Democratic
- Peter Norbeck, Republican
- C. K. Thompson, Prohibition
- Fred L. Fairchild, Socialist

=== Results ===
1916 South Dakota gubernatorial election
Party	Candidate	Votes	%	±%
Republican	Peter Norbeck	72,789	56.64%	+6.57%
Democratic	Orville V. Rinehart	50,545	39.33%	+4.13%
Socialist	Fred L. Fairchild	3,556	2.77%	+0.05%
Prohibition	C. K. Thompson	1,630	1.27%	−0.84%
Majority		22,244	17.31%	+2.44%
Turnout		128,520	100.00%	
Republican hold				

== Bibliography ==
- Gubernatorial Elections, 1787-1997. Washington, D.C.: Congressional Quarterly Inc. 1998. ISBN 1-56802-396-0.
