= 1918 United States Senate election in South Dakota =

- November 5, 1918
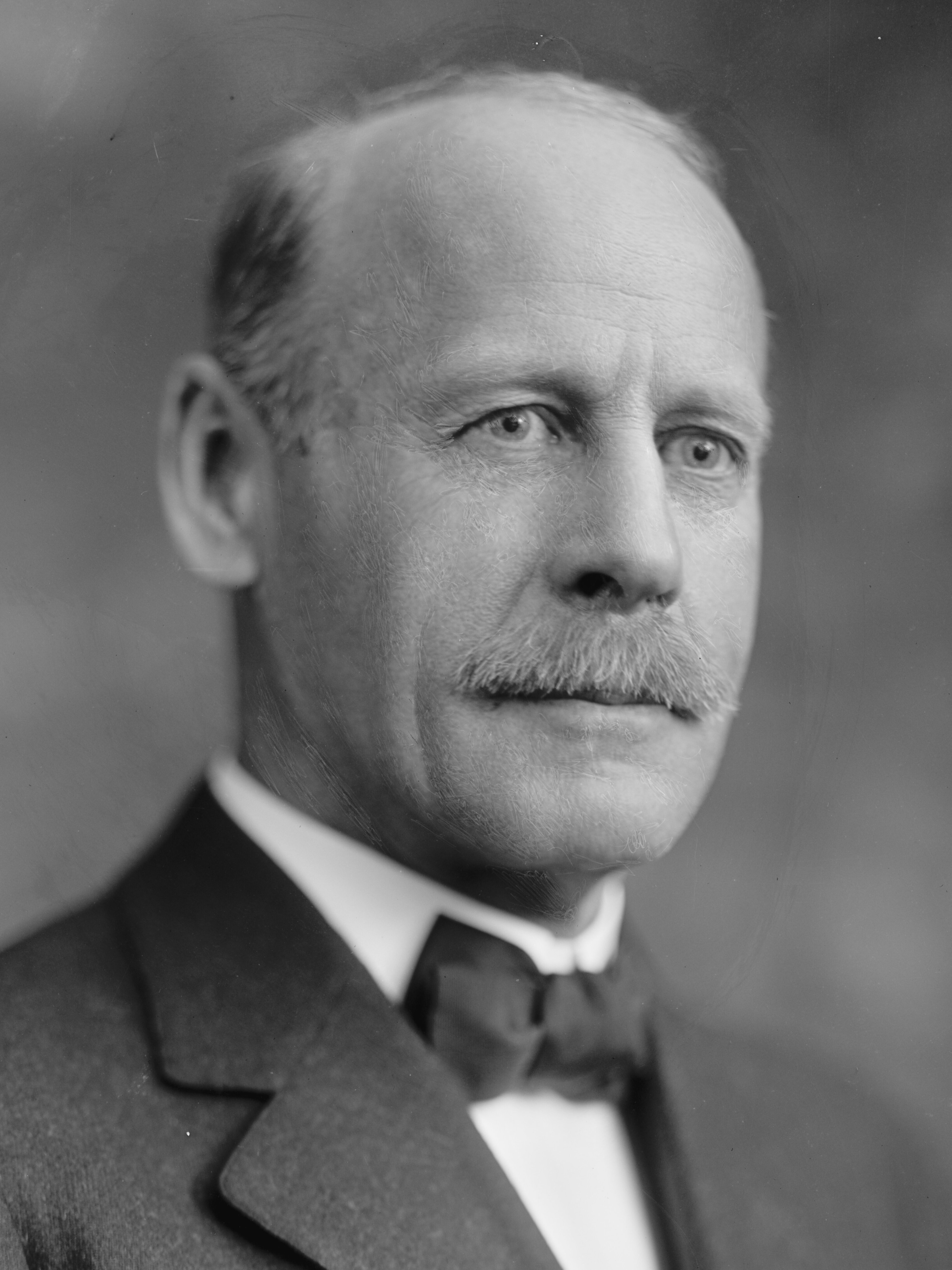

Nominee	Thomas Sterling	Orville V. Rinehart	W. T. Rafferty
Party	Republican	Democratic	Independent
Popular vote	51,198	36,210	5,560
Percentage	55.07%	38.95%	5.98%
- County results Sterling: 40–50% 50–60% 60–70% 70–80% Rinehart: 40–50% 50–60% 60–70% 70–80% No Vote
U.S. senator before election
Thomas Sterling
Republican
Elected U.S. Senator
Thomas Sterling
Republican

The 1918 United States Senate election in South Dakota took place on November 5, 1918. Incumbent Republican Senator Thomas Sterling sought re-election in his first popular election. He defeated former Governor Frank M. Byrne in the Republican primary and then faced former State Representative Orville Rinehart, the 1916 Democratic nominee for Governor, in the general election. Sterling defeated Rinehart, along with independent candidate W. T. Rafferty, by a wide margin to win re-election.

== Democratic primary ==
=== Candidates ===
- Orville V. Rinehart, former State Representative from Pennington County, 1916 Democratic nominee for Governor
- James Coffey, Internal Revenue Collector for North and South Dakota
- John E. Kelley, former U.S. Congressman from South Dakota's at-large congressional district

=== Results ===
Democratic primary
Party	Candidate	Votes	%
Democratic	Orville V. Rinehart	3,848	40.92%
Democratic	James Coffey	2,949	31.36%
Democratic	John E. Kelley	2,606	27.71%
Total votes		9,403	100.00%

== Republican primary ==
=== Candidates ===
- Thomas Sterling, incumbent U.S. Senator
- Frank M. Byrne, former Governor of South Dakota

=== Results ===
Republican primary
Party	Candidate	Votes	%
Republican	Thomas Sterling (inc.)	21,516	55.48%
Republican	Frank M. Byrne	17,264	44.52%
Total votes		38,780	100.00%

== Socialist Primary ==
=== Candidates ===
- John C. Knapp

=== Results ===
Socialist primary
Party	Candidate	Votes	%
Socialist	John C. Knapp	252	100.00%
Total votes		252	100.00%

After winning the primary, Knapp withdrew as a candidate, citing his disagreement with the Socialist Party's anti-war policies.

== General election ==
=== Results ===
1918 United States Senate election in South Dakota
Party	Candidate	Votes	%
Republican	Thomas Sterling (inc.)	51,198	55.07%
Democratic	Orville V. Rinehart	36,210	38.95%
Independent	W. T. Rafferty	5,560	5.98%
Majority		14,988	16.12%
Total votes		92,968	100.00%
Republican hold			
