= 1918 South Dakota gubernatorial election =

- November 5, 1918
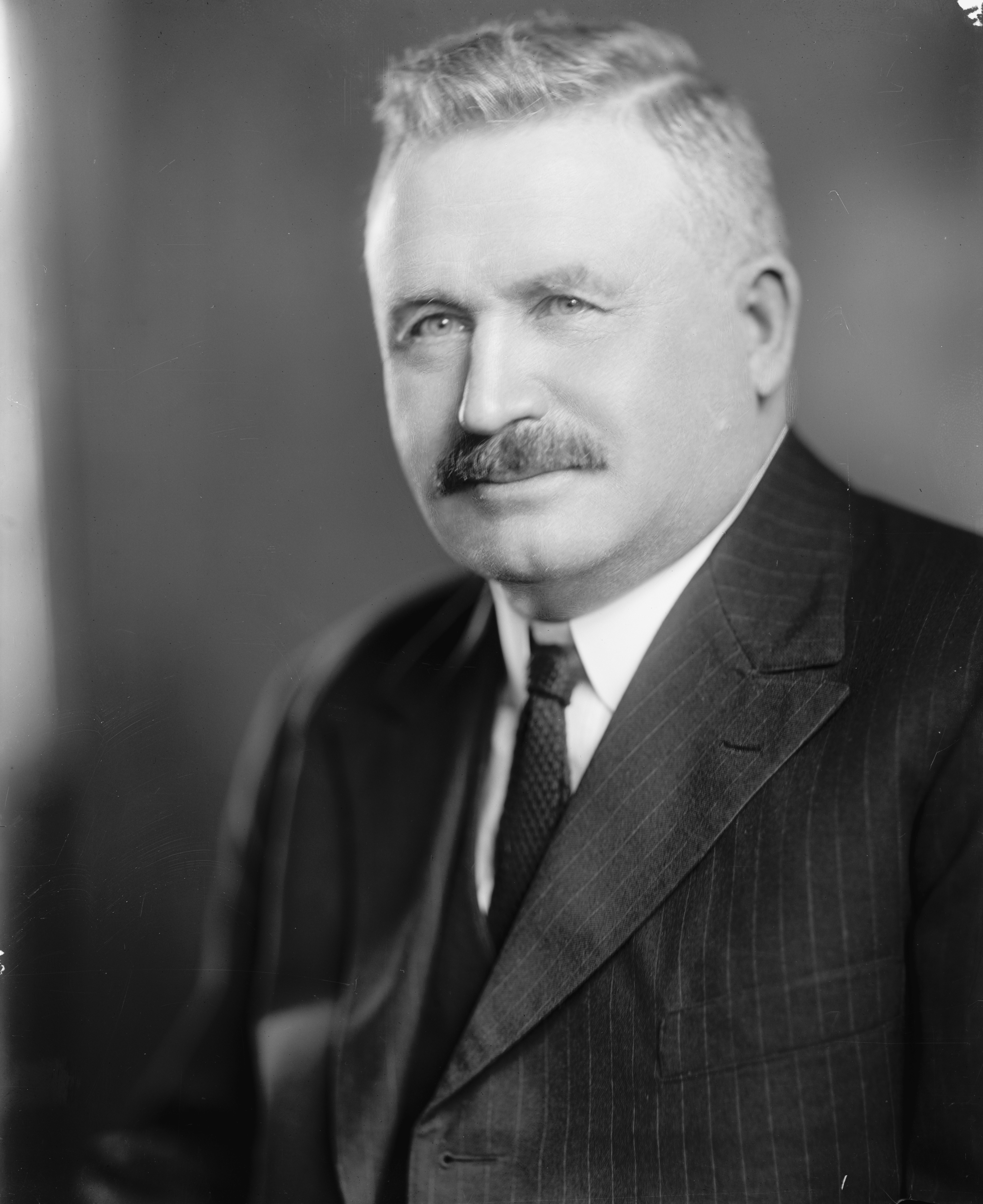

Nominee	Peter Norbeck	Mark P. Bates	James E. Bird
Party	Republican	Nonpartisan League	Democratic
Popular vote	51,175	25,118	17,858
Percentage	53.22%	26.12%	18.57%
- County results Norbeck: 40–50% 50–60% 60–70% Bates: 40–50% 50–60% 70–80% Bird: 50–60%
Governor before election
Peter Norbeck
Republican
Elected Governor
Peter Norbeck
Republican

The 1918 South Dakota gubernatorial election was held on November 5, 1918. Incumbent Republican Governor Peter Norbeck ran for re-election to a second term. He won the Republican primary unopposed and faced Nonpartisan League candidate Mark P. Bates, a farmer, and Democratic nominee James E. Bird in the general election. Norbeck's share of the vote decreased from 1916 to 53%, but he benefited from the split field. Bates placed second with 26% of the vote, while Bird placed third with 19% of the vote.

== Primary elections ==
Primary elections were held on May 28, 1918.

=== Democratic primary ===
==== Candidates ====
- James E. Bird, businessman, 1916 Democratic nominee for Secretary of State

==== Results ====
Democratic primary results
Party	Candidate	Votes	%
Democratic	James E. Bird	8,361	100.00%
Total votes		8,361	100.00%

=== Republican primary ===
==== Candidates ====
- Peter Norbeck, incumbent Governor

==== Results ====
Republican primary results
Party	Candidate	Votes	%
Republican	Peter Norbeck (inc.)	35,752	100.00%
Total votes		35,752	100.00%

=== Socialist primary ===
==== Candidates ====
- Orville Anderson, farmer and prisoner

==== Results ====
Socialist primary results
Party	Candidate	Votes	%
Socialist	Orville Anderson	241	100.00%
Total votes		241	100.00%

== General election ==
=== Candidates ===
- James E. Bird, Democratic
- Peter Norbeck, Republican
- Orville Anderson, Socialist
- Mark P. Bates, Independent (Nonpartisan League candidate), stockman
- Knute Lewis, Independent, Prohibition candidate for Governor in 1898 and 1906

=== Results ===
1918 South Dakota gubernatorial election
Party	Candidate	Votes	%	±%
Republican	Peter Norbeck (inc.)	51,175	53.22%	−3.42%
Nonpartisan League	Mark P. Bates	25,118	26.12%	—
Democratic	James E. Bird	17,858	18.57%	−20.76%
Independent	Knute Lewis	1,268	1.32%	—
Socialist	Orville Anderson	741	0.77%	−2.00%
Majority		26,057	27.10%	+9.79%
Turnout		96,160	100.00%	
Republican hold				

== Bibliography ==
- Gubernatorial Elections, 1787-1997. Washington, D.C.: Congressional Quarterly Inc. 1998. ISBN 1-56802-396-0.
