= 1932 South Dakota Senate election =

- November 8, 1932

45 seats in the South Dakota Senate 23 seats needed for a majority
	Majority party	Minority party
Leader	L. J. Larson	L. M. Simons
Party	Democratic	Republican
Leader since	1931	1929
Leader's seat	9th (Aurora–Douglas)	39th (Butte–Lawrence)
Last election	14	31
Seats won	30	15
Seats after	29 (Note: Senator-elect James Edwin Williams of Davison County (District 13) did not take office due to illness, and died February 2, 1933.)	15
Seat change	▲16	▼16
- Democratic gain Democratic hold Republican gain Republican hold Did not take office Multi-member districts: Democratic majority Republican majority Even split Democratic: 40–50% 50–60% 60–70% Republican: 50–60% 60–70% Unopposed
President pro tempore before election
L. M. Simons
Republican
Elected President pro tempore
L. J. Larson
Democratic

Elections to the South Dakota Senate were held on November 8, 1932, to elect 45 candidates to the Senate to serve a two-year term in the 23rd South Dakota Legislature. Democrats won thirty seats, a massive gain from the fourteen they won at the 1930 general election, taking over the chamber. Democratic Senator L. J. Larson of Plankinton was elected President pro tempore of the Senate.

This election took place alongside races for U.S. President, U.S. Senate, U.S. House, governor, state house, and numerous other state and local elections.

== See also ==
- List of South Dakota state legislatures
