= Peter Norbeck =

American politician

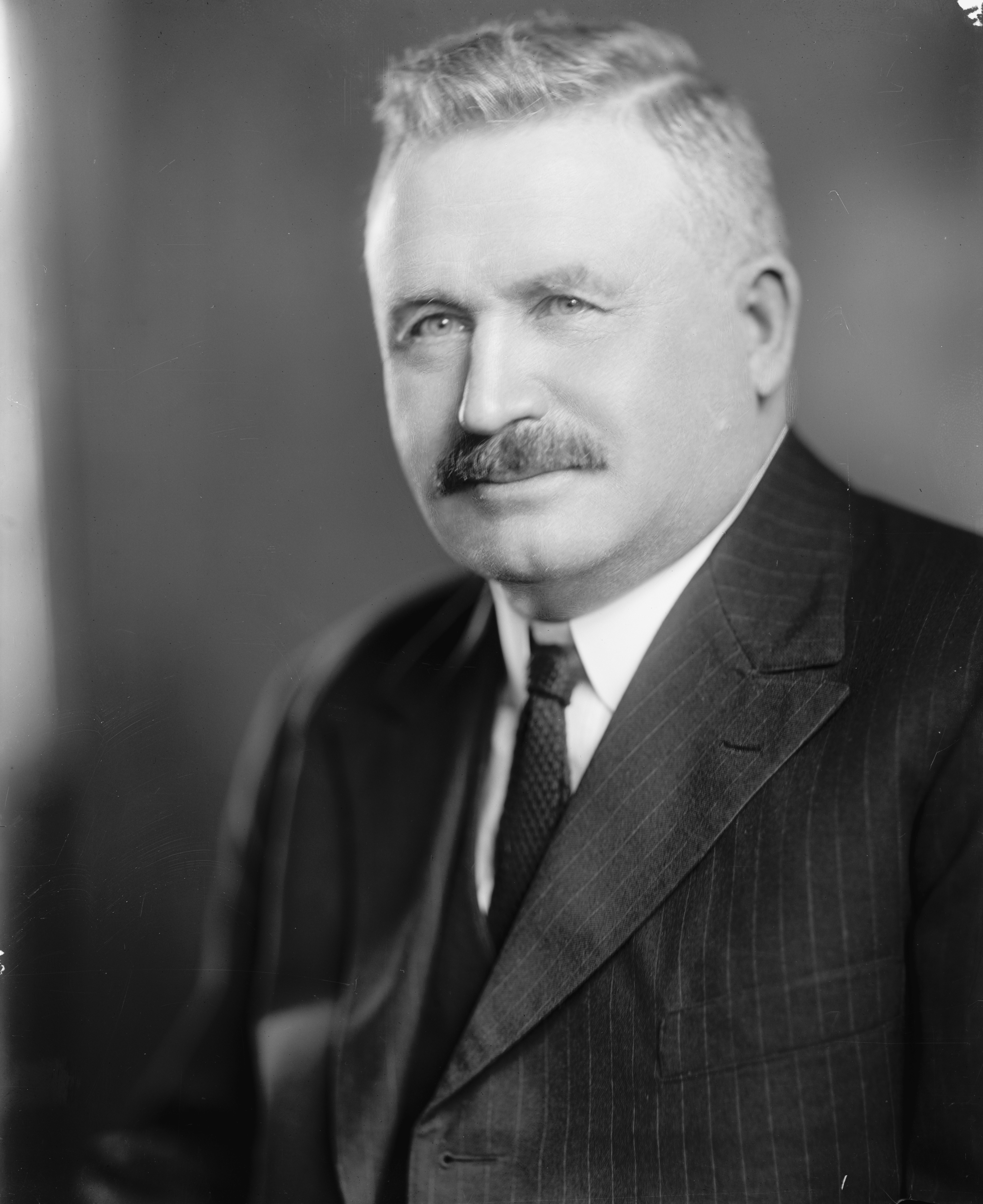

United States Senator from South Dakota
- In office March 4, 1921 – December 20, 1936
- Preceded by: Edwin S. Johnson
- Succeeded by: Herbert E. Hitchcock

9th Governor of South Dakota
- In office January 2, 1917 – January 4, 1921
- Lieutenant: William H. McMaster
- Preceded by: Frank M. Byrne
- Succeeded by: William H. McMaster

11th Lieutenant Governor of South Dakota
- In office 1915–1917
- Governor: Frank M. Byrne
- Preceded by: E. L. Abel
- Succeeded by: William H. McMaster

Member of the South Dakota Senate
- In office 1909–1915

Personal details
- Born: August 27, 1870 Clay County, Dakota Territory
- Died: December 20, 1936 (aged 66) Redfield, South Dakota, U.S.
- Party: Republican
- Spouse: Lydia Theresa Anderson (m. 1901)
- Children: 4
- Profession: Well driller

Peter Norbeck (August 27, 1870 – December 20, 1936) was an American politician from South Dakota. After serving two terms as the ninth governor of South Dakota, he was elected to three consecutive terms as a United States senator.

Norbeck was the first native-born governor of South Dakota to serve in office, and the first native-born U.S. senator from South Dakota (he was born in the portion of the Dakota Territory that would later become the state of South Dakota). He is best remembered as "Mount Rushmore's great political patron", for promoting the construction of the giant sculpture at Mount Rushmore and securing federal funding for it.

== Early life and education ==
Norbeck was the eldest of six children born to immigrants George (born in Jämtland, Sweden) and Karen( Larson) Norbeck, who was Norwegian. At the time of Norbeck's birth, his family was living in a dugout on the family's 160 acres (0.65 km^{2}), located eight miles (13 km) northeast of Vermillion in the Dakota Territory. He attended the public schools and the University of South Dakota at Vermillion. In 1895 he was a contractor and driller of deep water, oil, and gas wells. He moved to Redfield, South Dakota, in 1900 and added agricultural pursuits.

He married Lydia Theresa Anderson in June 1901. They had three daughters, Nellie, Ruth, and Selma (aka Sally); and one son, Harold.

== Personal affiliations ==
Norbeck was a Freemason, and a member of the Grand Lodge of South Dakota. He received the 32° of the Ancient and Accepted Scottish Rite, Southern Jurisdiction in Yankton, SD on 22 June 1919, and was also a member of Yelduz Shriners in Aberdeen, South Dakota. His Blue (Craft) lodge name and number are not known.

== Career ==
On May 9, 1908, Norbeck ran for the South Dakota State Senate from Spink County. He ran as a Progressive Republican. After being elected to the first of three terms, he joined Coe Crawford's inner circle of Progressives. In 1914, Norbeck reluctantly accepted Governor Frank Byrne's invitation to run for Lieutenant Governor on the Republican ticket; they ended up winning.

In 1916, Norbeck ran for governor and beat Democratic candidate W.T. Rinehart, becoming the ninth Governor of South Dakota. He served in that office from 1917 to 1921.

In 1920, Norbeck was elected United States Senator. He won the election with 50% of the vote, running against a Democrat and two fairly strong independent candidates; the Democrat finished third. Norbeck was re-elected to the Senate in 1926 and 1932.

== South Dakota tourism and Mount Rushmore ==
Norbeck made a number of contributions to South Dakota's tourism industry. He worked with sculptor Gutzon Borglum to help him create his huge sculpture at Mount Rushmore, convinced presidents Calvin Coolidge and Franklin D. Roosevelt to support it, and shepherded multiple bills through Congress to provide federal funding for it. He encouraged the development of the Iron Mountain Road in the Black Hills. He also pushed for the development of Sylvan Lake, Needles Highway, Badlands National Park, Custer State Park, Wind Cave National Park, and the Game Sanctuary in the Black Hills.

As outgoing Republican chairman during the last months of the Herbert Hoover presidency, Norbeck appointed Ferdinand Pecora as Chief Counsel to the U.S. Senate's Committee on Banking and Currency. The Committee investigated the Wall Street Crash of 1929.

== Death and memorials ==
Norbeck died of cancer in Redfield, South Dakota, during his third term as United States Senator in 1936. He is interred at Bloomington Church Cemetery, Platte, South Dakota.

The Peter Norbeck Summer House, in Custer State Park, is listed on the National Register of Historic Places.

== See also ==
- Peter Norbeck Scenic Byway
- List of members of the United States Congress who died in office (1900–1949)

Party political offices
Preceded by Frank M. Byrne	Republican nominee for Governor of South Dakota; 1916, 1918	Succeeded by William H. McMaster
Preceded by Charles H. Burke	Republican nominee for U.S. Senator from South Dakota (Class 3); 1920, 1926, 1932	Succeeded by Gladys Pyle
Political offices
Preceded by E. L. Abel	Lieutenant Governor of South Dakota; 1915–1917	Succeeded by William H. McMaster
Preceded by Frank M. Byrne	Governor of South Dakota; 1917–1921	Succeeded by William H. McMaster
U.S. Senate
Preceded by Edwin S. Johnson	U.S. senator (Class 3) from South Dakota; 1921–1936; Served alongside: Thomas Sterling, William H. McMaster, William J. Bulow	Succeeded by Herbert E. Hitchcock
