= 1932 United States Senate election in South Dakota =

- November 8, 1932
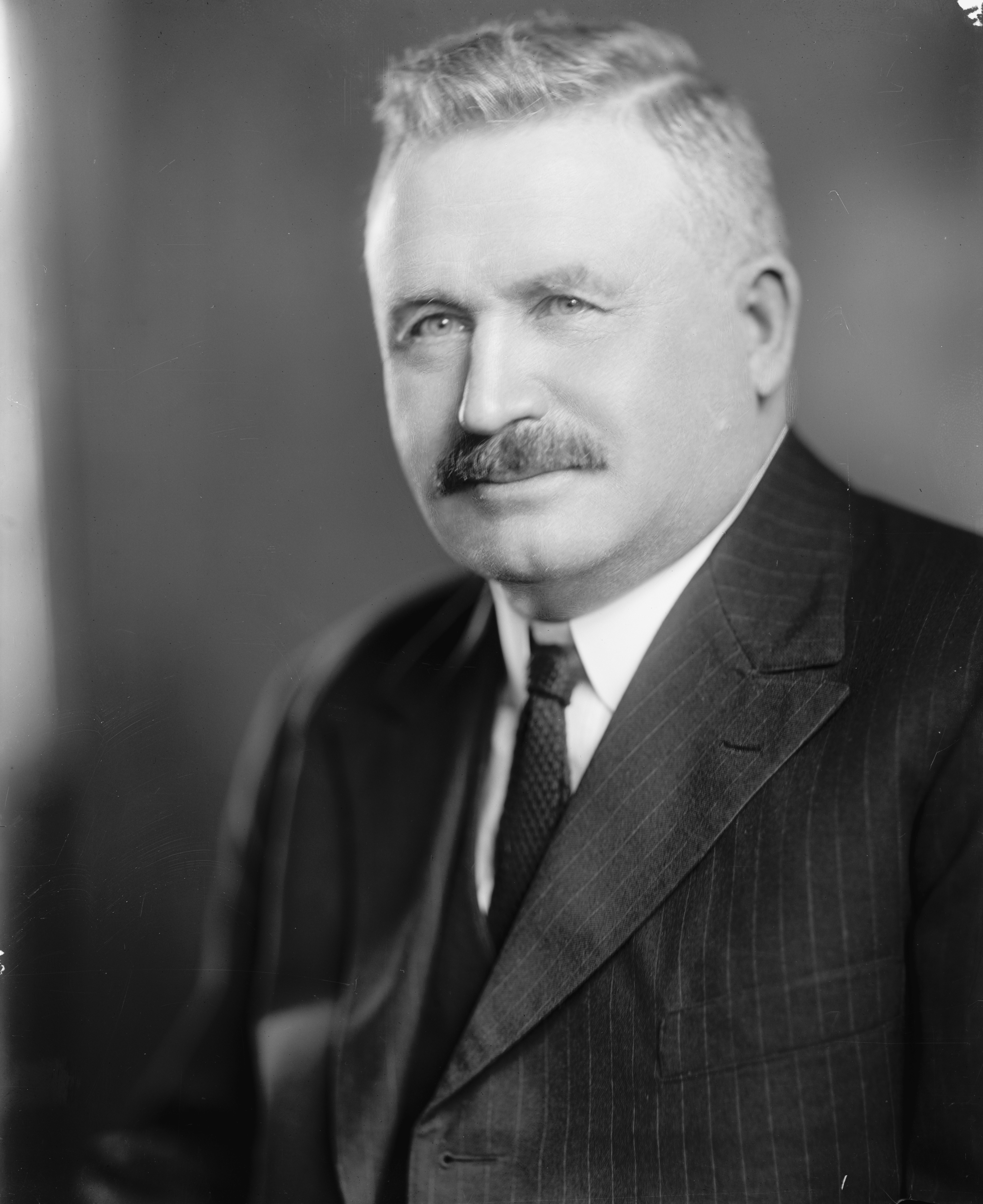

Nominee	Peter Norbeck	Ulysses Simpson Grant Cherry
Party	Republican	Democratic
Popular vote	151,845	125,731
Percentage	53.83%	44.57%
- County results Norbeck: 40–50% 50–60% 60–70% 70–80% Cherry: 40–50% 50–60% >90%
U.S. senator before election
Peter Norbeck
Republican
Elected U.S. Senator
Peter Norbeck
Republican

The 1932 United States Senate election in South Dakota took place on November 8, 1932. Incumbent Republican Senator Peter Norbeck ran for re-election to a third term. After easily turning back a challenge from former State Senator Harry F. Brownell in the Republican primary, Norbeck faced attorney Ulysses Simpson Grant Cherry, the Democratic nominee, in the general election. Owing in part to Franklin D. Roosevelt's landslide victory in South Dakota, the race was much closer than it was in 1926, but Norbeck still defeated Cherry by a decisive margin to win his third, and final, term. Norbeck died in office on December 20, 1936, triggering a special election in 1938.

== Democratic primary ==
=== Candidates ===
- Ulysses Simpson Grant Cherry, Sioux Falls attorney, 1920 Democratic nominee for the U.S. Senate
- Lewis W. Bicknell, Day County State's Attorney
- Mark Sheafe Jr., former State Senator

=== Results ===
Democratic primary
Party	Candidate	Votes	%
Democratic	Ulysses Simpson Grant Cherry	17,567	42.60%
Democratic	Lewis W. Bicknell	15,718	38.12%
Democratic	Mark Sheafe, Jr.	7,949	19.28%
Total votes		41,234	100.00%

== Republican primary ==
=== Candidates ===
- Peter Norbeck, incumbent U.S. Senator
- Harry F. Brownell, former State Senator
- Charles Hartsough

=== Results ===
Republican primary
Party	Candidate	Votes	%
Republican	Peter Norbeck (inc.)	95,498	74.31%
Republican	Harry F. Brownell	27,777	21.61%
Republican	Charles Hartsough	5,233	4.07%
Total votes		128,508	100.00%

== General election ==
=== Results ===
1932 United States Senate election in South Dakota
Party	Candidate	Votes	%	±%
Republican	Peter Norbeck (inc.)	151,845	53.83%	−5.69%
Democratic	Ulysses Simpson Grant Cherry	125,731	44.57%	+11.29%
Liberty	Howard Platte	3,873	1.37%	—
Independent	Oscar Luttio	405	0.14%	—
Independent	L. J. Manbeck	238	0.08%	—
Majority		26,114	9.26%	−16.99%
Turnout		282,092		
Republican hold				
