= 1910 South Dakota gubernatorial election =

- November 8, 1910
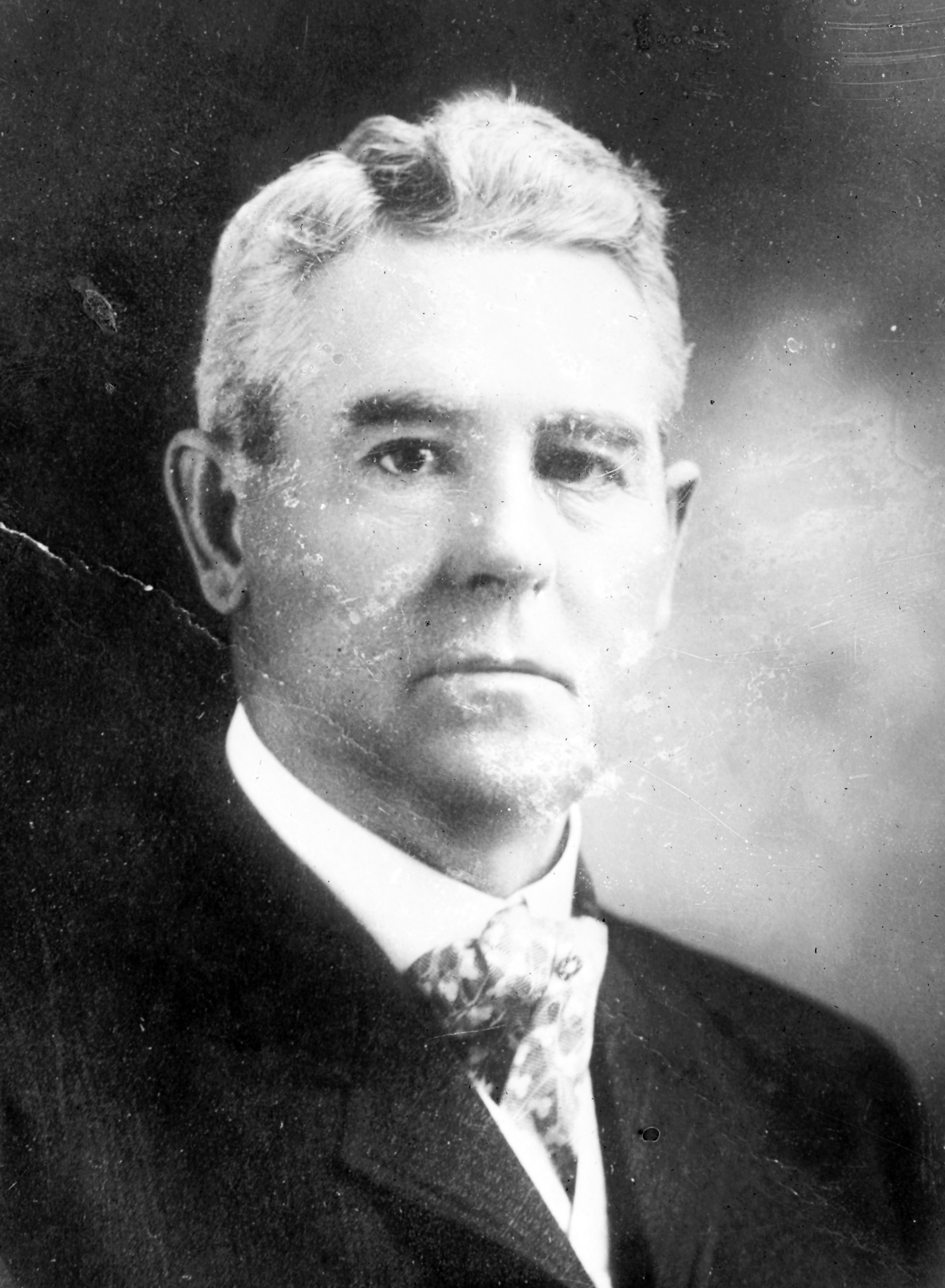

Nominee	Robert S. Vessey	Chauncey L. Wood
Party	Republican	Democratic
Popular vote	61,744	37,983
Percentage	58.35%	35.90%
- County results Vessey: 40–50% 50–60% 60–70% 70–80% 80–90% Wood: 40–50% 50–60% No Vote
Governor before election
Robert S. Vessey
Republican
Elected Governor
Robert S. Vessey
Republican

The 1910 South Dakota gubernatorial election was held on November 8, 1910. Incumbent Republican Governor Robert S. Vessey ran for re-election to a second term. He faced two serious competitors in the Republican primary: colorful disbarred attorney George W. Egan and former Governor Samuel H. Elrod, and won the primary only with a narrow plurality. In the general election, he faced Democratic nominee Chauncey L. Wood, the Mayor of Rapid City. He improved on his margin from 1908, defeating Wood in a landslide.

== Primary elections ==
Primary elections were held on June 7, 1910.

=== Democratic primary ===
==== Candidates ====
- Chauncey L. Wood, Mayor of Rapid City

==== Results ====
Democratic primary results
Party	Candidate	Votes	%
Democratic	Chauncey L. Wood	6,181	100.00%
Total votes		6,181	100.00%

=== Republican primary ===
==== Candidates ====
- Robert S. Vessey, incumbent Governor
- George W. Egan, disbarred attorney
- Samuel H. Elrod, former Governor

==== Results ====
Republican primary results
Party	Candidate	Votes	%
Republican	Robert S. Vessey (inc.)	26,372	38.70%
Republican	George W. Egan	21,446	31.47%
Republican	Samuel H. Elrod	20,335	29.84%
Total votes		68,153	100.00%

=== Prohibition primary ===
==== Candidates ====
- O. W. Butterfield

==== Results ====
Prohibition primary results
Party	Candidate	Votes	%
Prohibition	O. W. Butterfield	687	100.00
Total votes		687	100.00

== General election ==
=== Candidates ===
- Chauncey L. Wood, Democratic
- Robert S. Vessey, Republican
- O. W. Butterfield, Prohibition
- M. G. Opsahl, Independent

=== Results ===
1910 South Dakota gubernatorial election
Party	Candidate	Votes	%	±%
Republican	Robert S. Vessey (inc.)	61,744	58.35%	+3.01%
Democratic	Chauncey L. Wood	37,983	35.90%	−3.50%
Prohibition	O. W. Butterfield	4,506	4.26%	+1.15%
Independent	M. G. Opsahl	1,579	1.49%	—
Majority		23,761	22.46%	+6.51%
Turnout		105,812	100.00%	
Republican hold		Swing		
