= 1908 South Dakota gubernatorial election =

- November 3, 1908
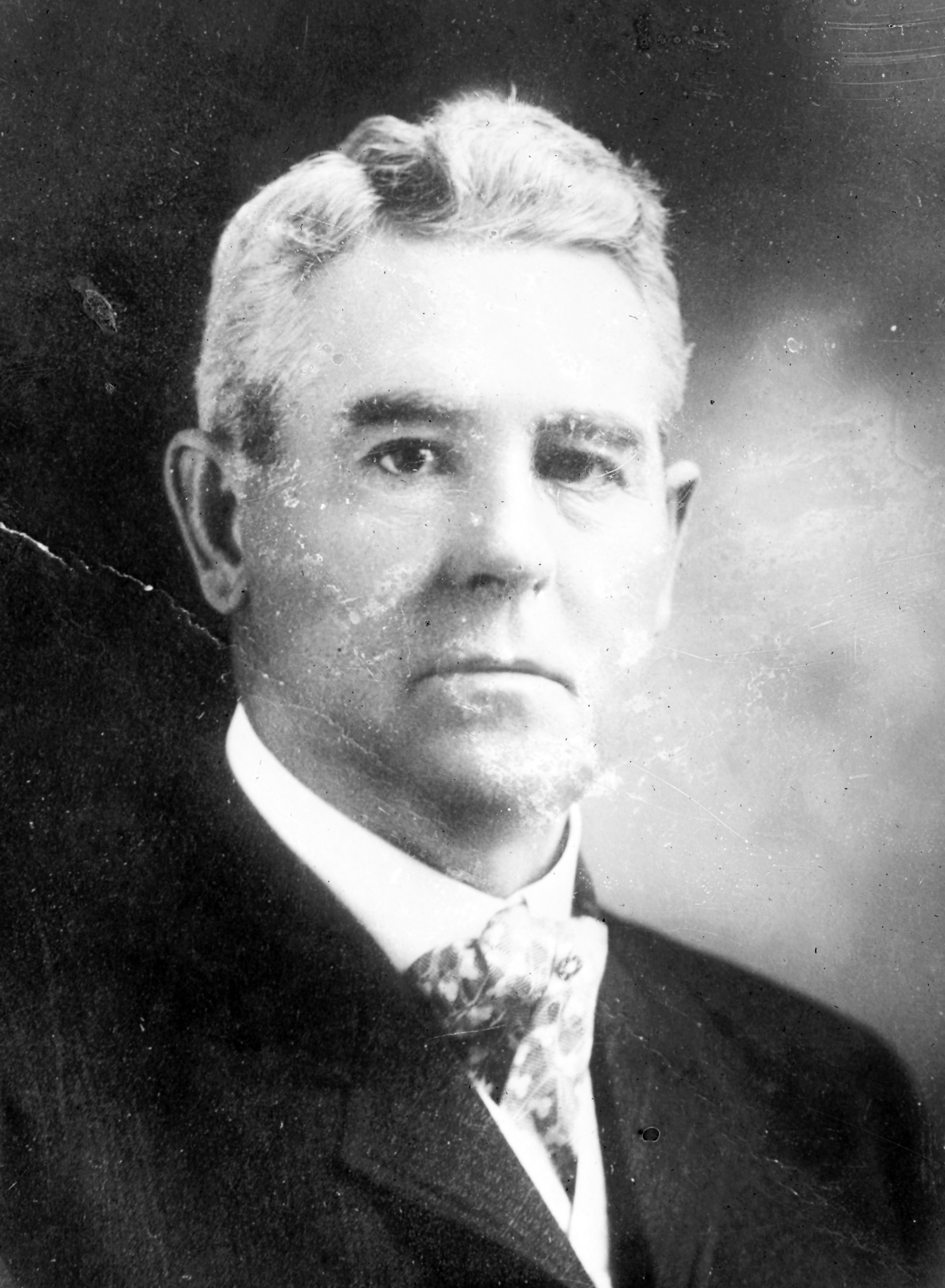

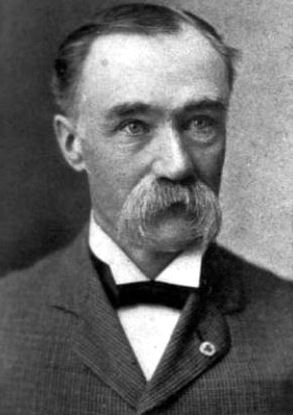
Nominee	Robert S. Vessey	Andrew E. Lee
Party	Republican	Democratic
Popular vote	62,989	44,876
Percentage	55.28%	39.39%
- County results Vessey: 40–50% 50–60% 60–70% 70–80% Lee: 50–60% No Vote
Governor before election
Coe I. Crawford
Republican
Elected Governor
Robert S. Vessey
Republican

The 1908 South Dakota gubernatorial election was held on November 3, 1908. Incumbent Republican Governor Coe I. Crawford opted to run for the U.S. Senate rather than run for re-election. State Senator Robert S. Vessey narrowly won the Republican primary over former State Representative John L. Browne and advanced to the general election, where he faced the Democratic nominee, former Governor Andrew E. Lee. Though Vessey's performance was significantly reduced from Crawford's performance in 1906, he still defeated Lee by a wide margin.

== Primary elections ==
Primary elections were held on June 9, 1908.

=== Democratic primary ===
==== Candidates ====
- Andrew E. Lee, former Governor

==== Results ====
Democratic primary results
Party	Candidate	Votes	%
Democratic	Andrew E. Lee	7,567	100.00%
Total votes		7,657	100.00%

=== Republican primary ===
==== Candidates ====
- John L. Browne, State Representative
- Robert S. Vessey, State Senator

==== Results ====
Republican primary results
Party	Candidate	Votes	%
Republican	Robert S. Vessey	32,024	50.93%
Republican	John L. Browne	30,860	49.07%
Total votes		62,884	100.00%

=== Socialist primary ===
==== Candidates ====
- J. C. Knapp

==== Results ====
Socialist primary results
Party	Candidate	Votes	%
Socialist	J. C. Knapp	451	100.00%
Total votes		451	100.00%

== General election ==
=== Results ===
1908 South Dakota gubernatorial election
Party	Candidate	Votes	%	±%
Republican	Robert S. Vessey	62,989	55.34%	−9.97%
Democratic	Andrew E. Lee	44,876	39.39%	+12.68%
Prohibition	G. F. Knappen	3,536	3.11%	−1.45%
Socialist	J. C. Knapp	2,542	2.15%	−1.25%
Majority		18,113	15.95%	−22.65%
Turnout		113,943	100.00%	
Republican hold				
