= 1914 South Dakota gubernatorial election =

- November 3, 1914
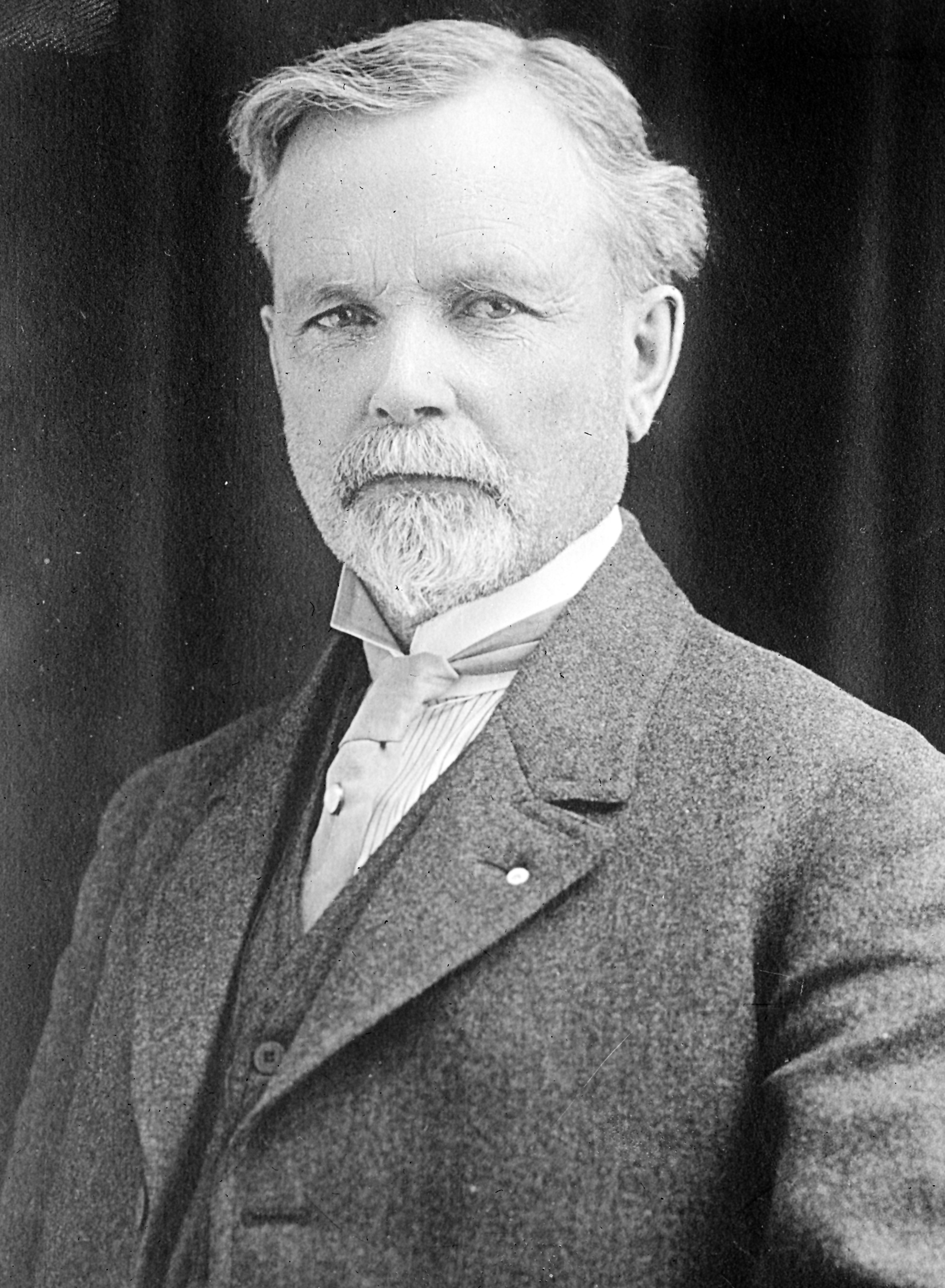

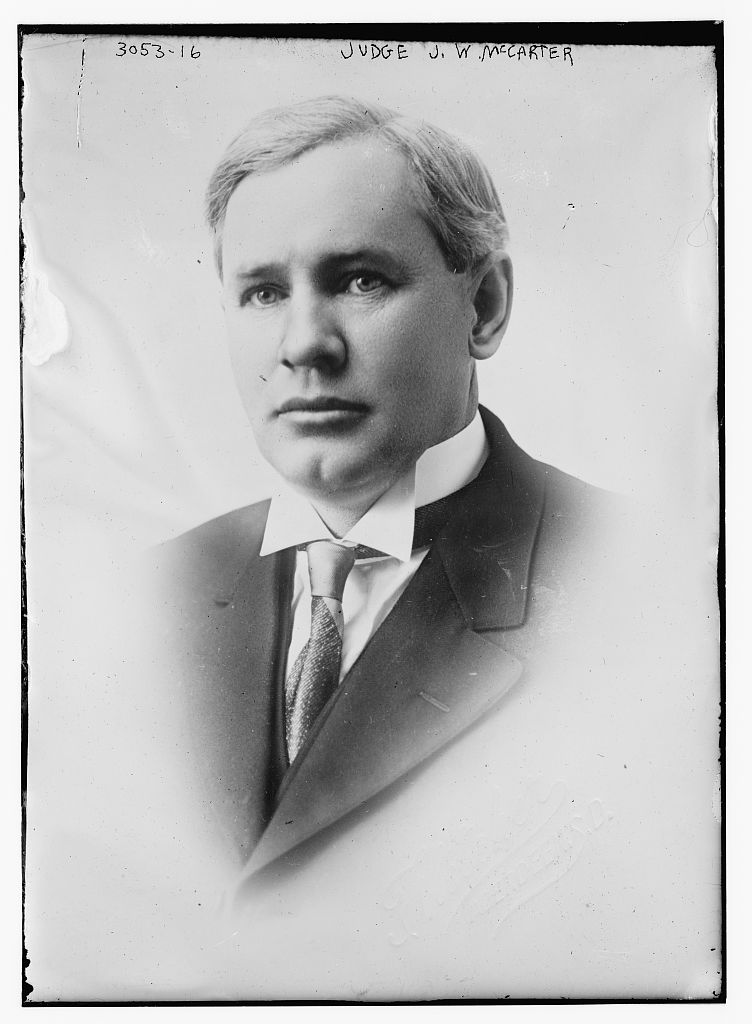

Nominee	Frank M. Byrne	James W. McCarter	Richard O. Richards
Party	Republican	Democratic	Independent
Popular vote	49,138	34,542	9,725
Percentage	50.07%	35.20%	9.91%
- County results Byrne: 40–50% 50–60% 60–70% 70–80% McCarter: 40–50% 50–60% 60–70% Richards: 40–50% No Vote
Governor before election
Frank M. Byrne
Republican
Elected Governor
Frank M. Byrne
Republican

The 1914 South Dakota gubernatorial election was held on November 3, 1914. Despite a close election in 1912, incumbent Republican governor Frank M. Byrne defeated Democratic nominee James W. McCarter, an Edmunds County Judge, with 50.07% of the vote. Coincidently, Bryne's Democratic opponent in 1912, Edwin S. Johnson, was elected the same year to represent South Dakota in the United States Senate.

== Primary elections ==
The state Primary elections were held on March 24, 1914.

=== Democratic primary ===
==== Candidates ====
- James W. McCarter, Edmunds County Judge

==== Results ====
Democratic primary results
Party	Candidate	Votes	%
Democratic	James W. McCarter	11,182	100.00
Total votes		11,182	100.00

=== Republican primary ===
==== Candidates ====
- Frank M. Byrne, incumbent governor
- H. B. Anderson, State Auditor
- Richard Olsen Richards, perennial candidate for office

==== Results ====
Republican primary results
Party	Candidate	Votes	%
Republican	Frank M. Byrne (inc.)	20,018	43.58%
Republican	H. B. Anderson	16,160	35.18%
Republican	Richard O. Richards	9,757	21.24%
Total votes		45,935	100.00%

=== Prohibition primary ===
==== Candidates ====
- C. K. Thompson

==== Results ====
Prohibition primary results
Party	Candidate	Votes	%
Prohibition	C. K. Thompson	581	100.00%
Total votes		581	100.00%

=== Socialist primary ===
==== Candidates ====
- John C. Knapp

==== Results ====
Socialist primary results
Party	Candidate	Votes	%
Socialist	John C. Knapp	748	100.00%
Total votes		748	100.00%

== General election ==
=== Candidates ===
- James W. McCarter, Democratic
- Frank M. Byrne, Republican
- Richard Olsen Richards, Independent
- C. K. Thompson, Prohibition
- John C. Knapp, Socialist

=== Results ===
1914 South Dakota gubernatorial election
Party	Candidate	Votes	%	±%
Republican	Frank M. Byrne (inc.)	49,138	50.07%	+1.56%
Democratic	James W. McCarter	34,542	35.20%	−10.51%
Independent	Richard O. Richards	9,725	9.91%	—
Socialist	John C. Knapp	2,664	2.71%	−0.24%
Prohibition	C. K. Thompson	2,072	2.11%	−0.72%
Majority		14,596	14.87%	+12.06%
Turnout		98,141	100.00%	
Republican hold				

== Bibliography ==
- Gubernatorial Elections, 1787-1997. Washington, D.C.: Congressional Quarterly Inc. 1998. ISBN 1-56802-396-0.
