= 1914 United States Senate election in South Dakota =

- November 3, 1914
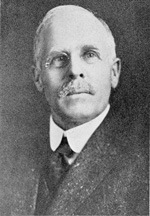

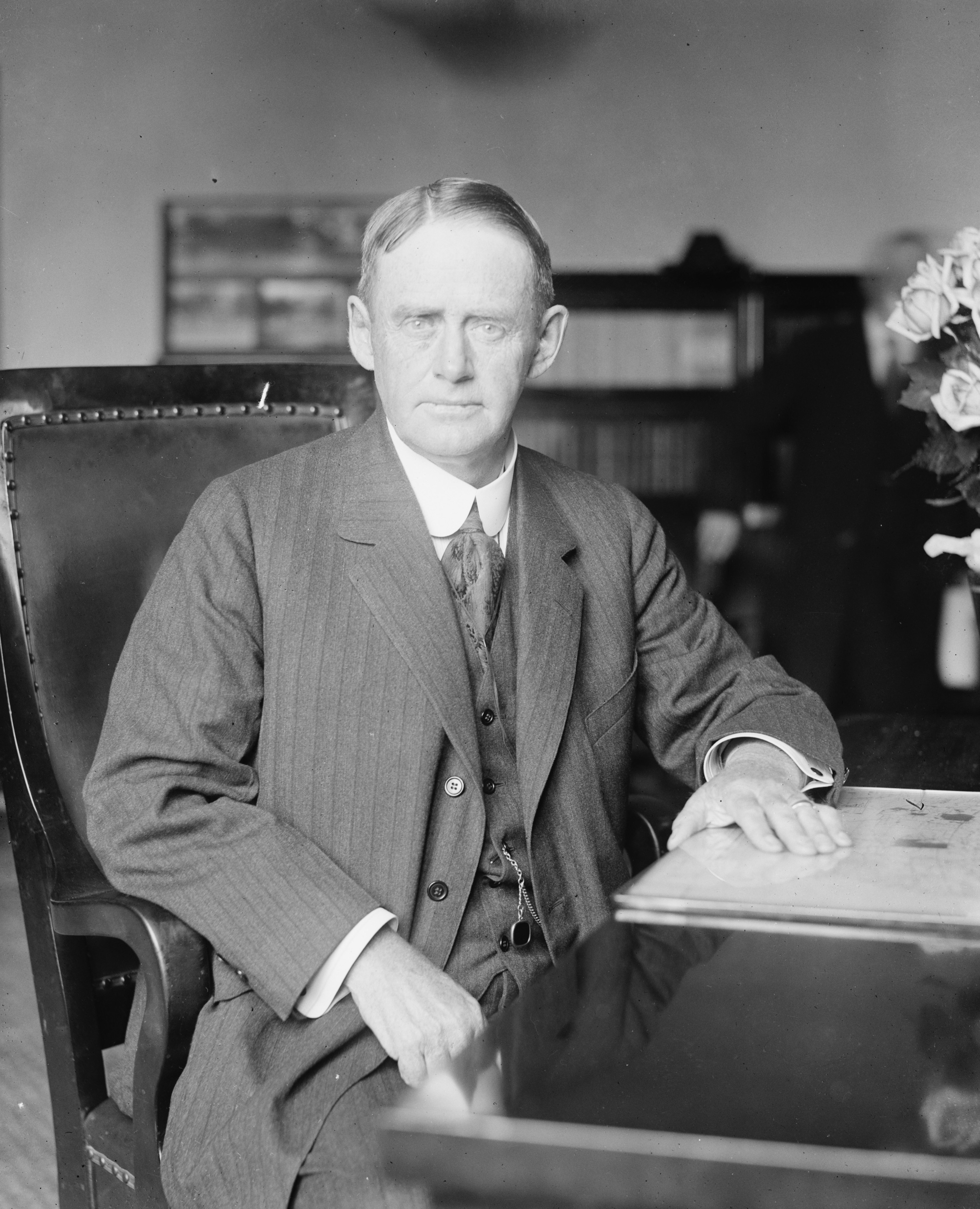
| Nominee | Edwin S. Johnson | Charles H. Burke |
| Party | Democratic | Republican |
| Popular vote | 48,076 | 44,244 |
| Percentage | 48.32% | 44.46% |
- County results Johnson: 40–50% 50–60% 60–70% Burke: 40–50% 50–60% 60–70% 70–80%
U.S. senator before election
Coe I. Crawford
Republican
Elected U.S. Senator
Edwin S. Johnson
Democratic

The 1914 United States Senate election in South Dakota took place on November 3, 1914. Incumbent Senator Coe I. Crawford, a Republican, sought re-election in his first popular election. He was defeated in the Republican primary by Congressman Charles H. Burke, the House Minority Whip. In the general election, he was narrowly defeated by Edwin S. Johnson, the 1912 Democratic nominee for Governor, who won a narrow plurality. Edwin Stockton Johnson became the first Democrat ever to have been elected to the United States Senate from South Dakota and the first non-Republican to have been elected to the United States Senate from South Dakota since James Henderson Kyle in 1897.

== Democratic primary ==
=== Candidates ===
- Edwin S. Johnson, former State Senator, 1912 Democratic nominee for Governor

=== Results ===
Democratic primary
| Party | Candidate | Votes | % |
|---|---|---|---|
| Democratic | Edward S. Johnson | 11,422 | 100.00% |
| Total votes | | 11,422 | 100.00% |

== Republican primary ==
=== Candidates ===
- Charles H. Burke, U.S. Congressman from South Dakota's 2nd congressional district
- Coe I. Crawford, incumbent U.S. Senator

=== Results ===
Republican primary
| Party | Candidate | Votes | % |
|---|---|---|---|
| Republican | Charles H. Burke | 25,201 | 55.76% |
| Republican | Coe I. Crawford (inc.) | 19,992 | 44.24% |
| Total votes | | 45,193 | 100.00% |

== Socialist Primary ==
=== Candidates ===
- E. P. Johnson

=== Results ===
Socialist primary
| Party | Candidate | Votes | % |
|---|---|---|---|
| Socialist | E. P. Johnson | 757 | 100.00% |
| Total votes | | 757 | 100.00% |

== Prohibition Primary ==
=== Candidates ===
- O. W. Butterfield

=== Results ===
Prohibition primary
| Party | Candidate | Votes | % |
|---|---|---|---|
| Prohibition | O. W. Butterfield | 582 | 100.00% |
| Total votes | | 582 | 100.00% |

== General election ==
=== Results ===
1914 United States Senate election in South Dakota
| Party | Candidate | Votes | % |
|---|---|---|---|
| Democratic | Edwin S. Johnson | 48,076 | 48.32% |
| Republican | Charles H. Burke | 44,244 | 44.46% |
| Socialist | E. P. Johnson | 2,674 | 2.69% |
| Prohibition | O. W. Butterfield | 2,406 | 2.42% |
| Independent | H. L. Loucks | 2,104 | 2.11% |
| Majority | | 3,832 | 3.85% |
| Total votes | | 99,504 | 100.00% |
| Democratic gain from Republican | | | |
