= James W. McCarter =

American judge (1872–1939)

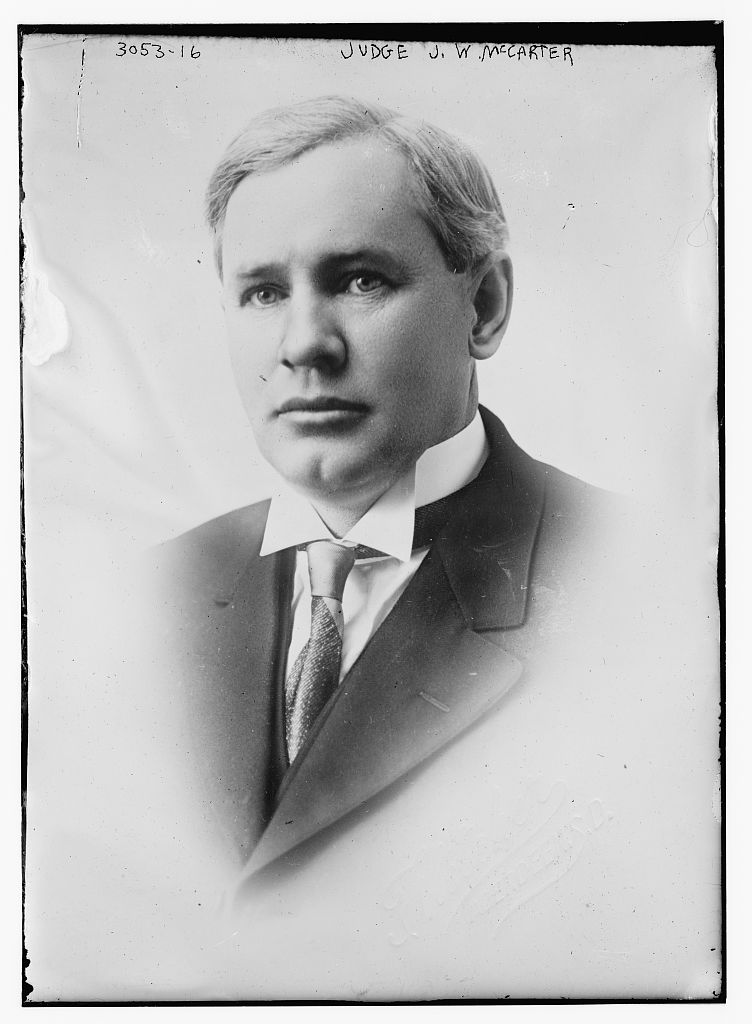

James Wallace McCarter (1872–1939), ran for Governor of South Dakota in 1914.

== Biography ==
He was born in Jarvis, Ontario on July 29, 1872. He was the county judge in South Dakota from 1910 to 1913. He ran for Governor of South Dakota in 1914, losing to Frank M. Byrne. He was also a candidate for U.S. Representative from the 2nd District of South Dakota in 1918. He died in 1939.

Party political offices
Preceded by Edwin S. Johnson	Democratic nominee for Governor of South Dakota; 1914	Succeeded by Orville V. Rinehart
