= Thomas Sterling =

American lawyer (1851–1930)

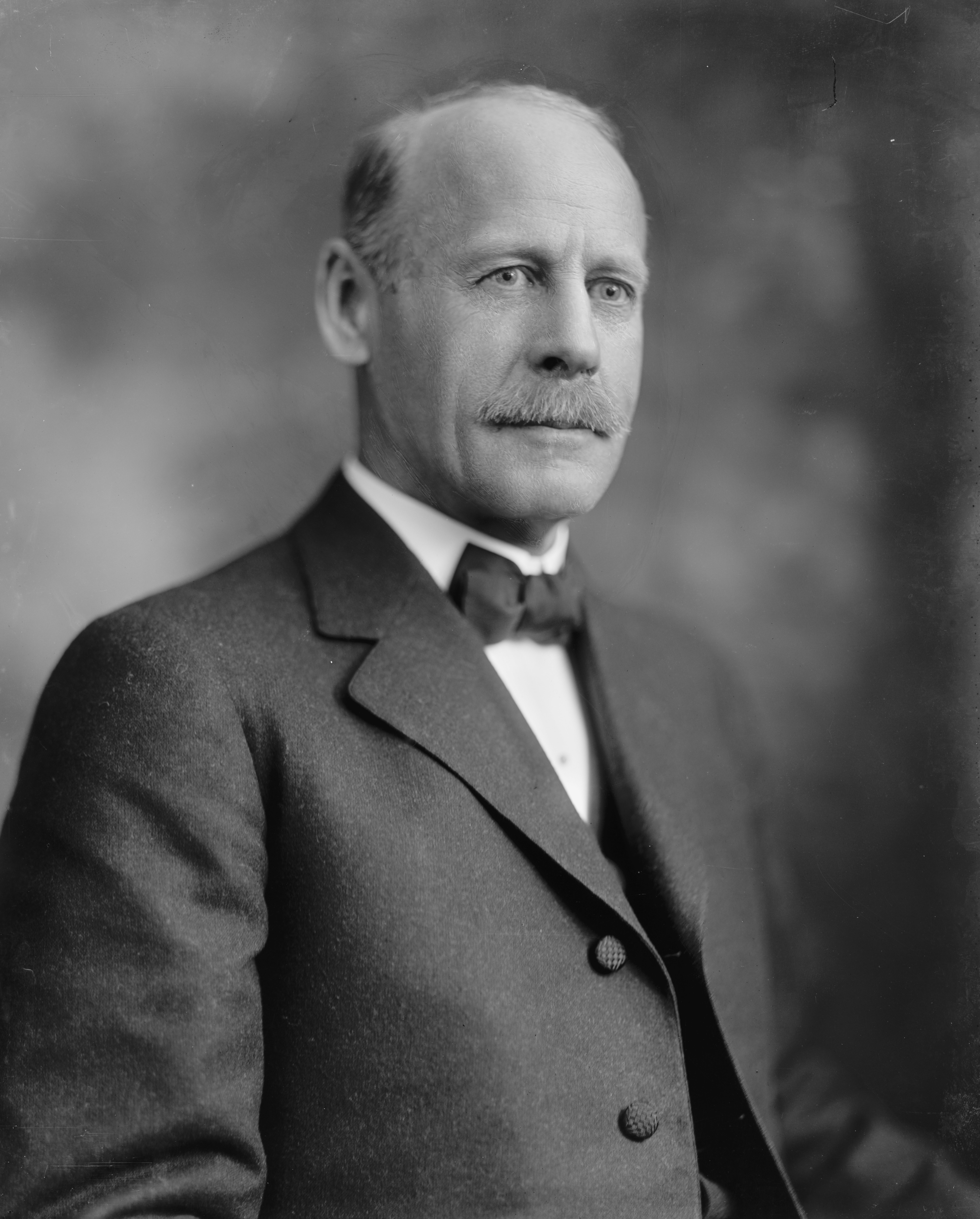

United States Senator from South Dakota
- In office March 4, 1913 – March 3, 1925
- Preceded by: Robert J. Gamble
- Succeeded by: William H. McMaster

Dean of University of South Dakota College of Law
- In office July 1, 1901 – June 10, 1911
- Preceded by: position established
- Succeeded by: Marshall McKusick

Personal details
- Born: February 21, 1851 Amanda, Ohio
- Died: August 26, 1930 (aged 79) Washington, D.C., U.S.
- Party: Republican
- Relatives: John A. Sterling (brother)
- Education: Illinois Wesleyan University
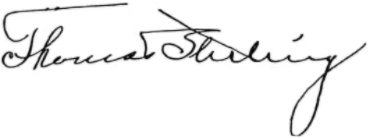
- Signature

Thomas Sterling (February 21, 1851 – August 26, 1930) was an American lawyer, politician, and academic who served as a member of the United States Senate and the first dean of the University of South Dakota College of Law.

A Republican, he served in the Senate from 1913 to 1925. He later served as dean and law professor at George Washington University Law School. The University of South Dakota School of Law awards "Sterling Honors" to their graduating top 10% in honor of their first dean.

== Early life and education ==
Sterling, was born near Amanda, Ohio. He moved with his parents, Charles Sterling (1821–1905) and Anna Kessler (1827–1908) to McLean County, Illinois in 1854, where he attended the public schools and graduated from Illinois Wesleyan University at Bloomington in 1875.

== Career ==
He was superintendent of schools of Bement, Illinois, from 1875 to 1877. His brother John A. Sterling, became a U.S. representative from Illinois.

=== Law ===
Sterling studied law and was admitted to the bar in 1878, commencing his practice in Springfield, Illinois. He became the city prosecuting attorney in 1880 until 1881. In 1882 he moved to the Territory of Dakota and located in Northville, Dakota Territory. He moved to Redfield in 1886 and continued the practice of law, serving as district attorney of Spink County, South Dakota, from 1886 to 1888. In 1889, he became a member of the State constitutional convention, and a year later in 1890 a member of the State senate. From 1901 to 1911 he was the first dean of the University of South Dakota College of Law at Vermillion.

=== Politics ===
He was elected in 1912 as a Republican to the United States Senate, was reelected in 1918, and served from March 4, 1913, to March 3, 1925. During this time, he served on the Overman Committee investigating seditious German and Bolshevik activities. He was an unsuccessful candidate for renomination in 1924, losing in the Republican primary to William H. McMaster, who won the general election. During the Sixty-sixth Congress, he was the chairman of the United States Senate Committee on Civil Service. In the Sixty-seventh Congress he served on the Committee on Civil Service, and on the Committee on Post Office and Post Roads during the Sixty-eighth Congress. While he served in Congress he served with William Williamson and Royal C. Johnson, two of his first graduates from the College of Law.

=== Later career ===
He practiced law in Washington, D.C., and served on the faculty of National University Law School, now George Washington University School of Law. He was appointed by President Calvin Coolidge in 1925 as field secretary of the Commission for the Celebration of the Two Hundredth Anniversary of the Birth of George Washington.

== Death ==
Sterling died in Washington, D.C., on August 26, 1930. He was interred in Cedar Hill Cemetery.

Party political offices
First	Republican nominee for U.S. Senator from South Dakota (Class 2); 1918	Succeeded by William H. McMaster
U.S. Senate
Preceded by Robert J. Gamble	U.S. senator (Class 2) from South Dakota; 1913–1925; Served alongside: Coe I. Crawford, Edwin S. Johnson, Peter Norbeck	Succeeded by William H. McMaster
