= Amanda, Ohio =

- Village
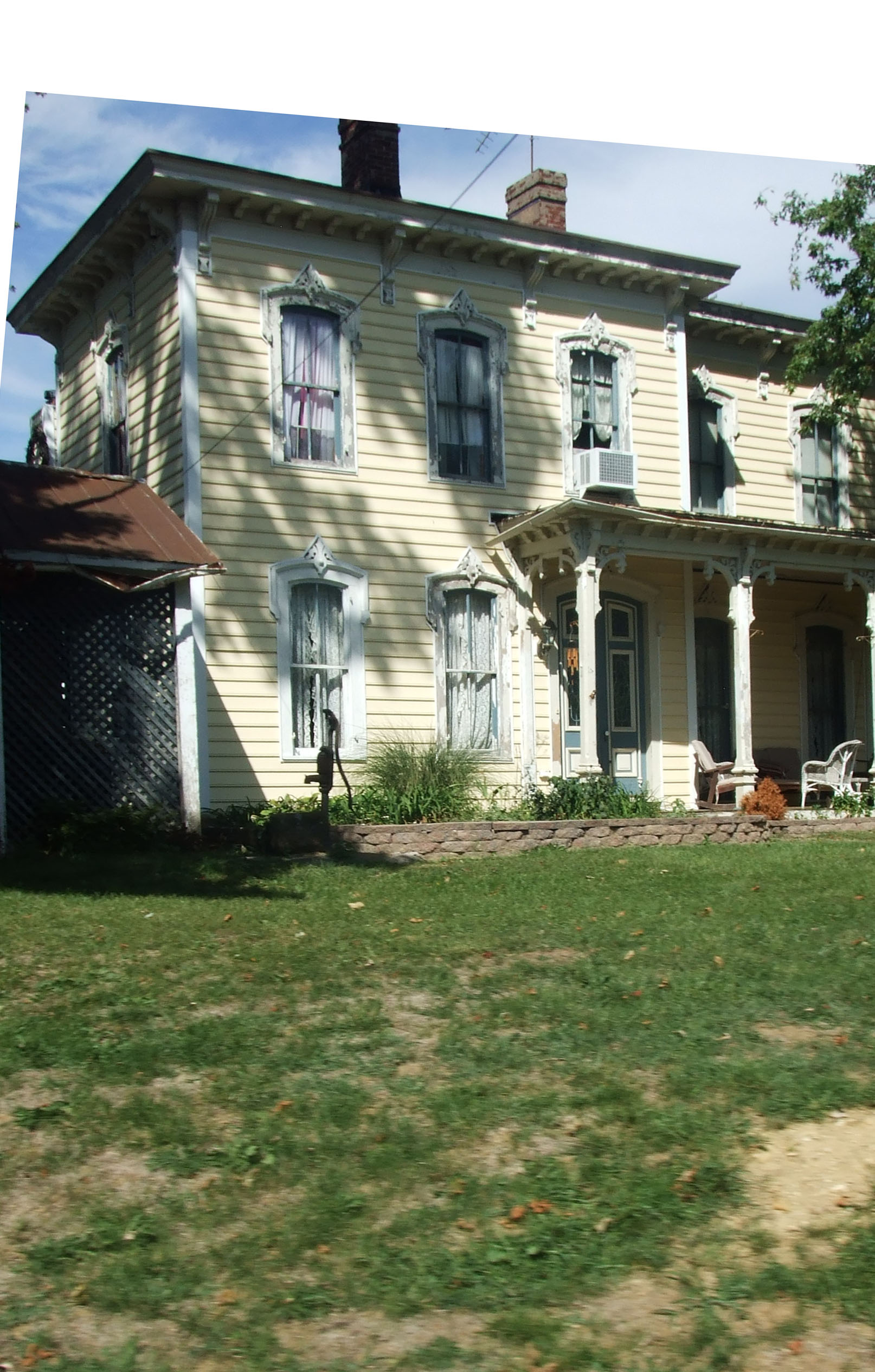
- Barr House

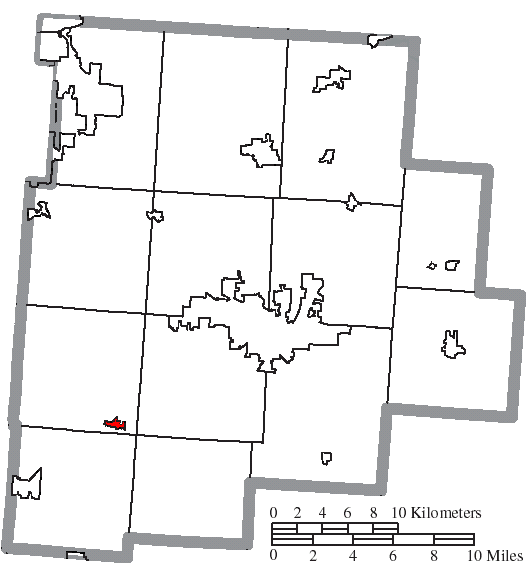
- Location of Amanda in Fairfield County
- Coordinates: 39°39′02″N 82°44′46″W
- Country: United States
- State: Ohio
- County: Fairfield County
- Township: Amanda Township

Area
  - Total: 0.32 sq mi (0.82 km^{2})
  - Land: 0.32 sq mi (0.82 km^{2})
  - Water: 0 sq mi (0.00 km^{2})
- Elevation: 935 ft (285 m)

Population (2020)
  - Total: 673
  - Estimate (2023): 680
  - Density: 2,122.6/sq mi (819.55/km^{2})
- Time zone: UTC-5 (Eastern (EST))
  - Summer (DST): UTC-4 (EDT)
- ZIP code: 43102
- Area code: 740
- FIPS code: 01630
- GNIS feature ID: 2397953
- Website: villageofamanda.com

Amanda is a village in Fairfield County, Ohio, United States. The population was 637 at the 2020 census.

== History ==
Amanda was founded around 1830, but development would not begin in earnest until 1850 when the railroad was extended to that point. A post office has been in operation at Amanda since 1832.

== Geography ==
According to the United States Census Bureau, the village has a total area of 0.30 square miles (0.78 km^{2}), all land.

== Demographics ==
Historical population
Census	Pop.	Note	%±
1850	181		—
1880	375		—
1890	469		25.1%
1910	484		—
1920	531		9.7%
1930	557		4.9%
1940	561		0.7%
1950	587		4.6%
1960	732		24.7%
1970	788		7.7%
1980	720		−8.6%
1990	729		1.3%
2000	707		−3.0%
2010	737		4.2%
2020	673		−8.7%
2023 (est.)	680	▲	1.0%
U.S. Decennial Census

=== 2010 census ===
As of the census of 2010, there were 737 people, 270 households, and 205 families living in the village. The population density was 2,456.7 inhabitants per square mile (948.5/km^{2}). There were 295 housing units at an average density of 983.3 per square mile (379.7/km^{2}). The racial makeup of the village was 96.6% White, 0.9% African American, 0.1% Pacific Islander, 0.5% from other races, and 1.8% from two or more races. Hispanic or Latino people of any race were 1.4% of the population.

There were 270 households, of which 43.3% had children under the age of 18 living with them, 56.7% were married couples living together, 11.5% had a female householder with no husband present, 7.8% had a male householder with no wife present, and 24.1% were non-families. 21.1% of all households were made up of individuals, and 8.9% had someone living alone who was 65 years of age or older. The average household size was 2.73 and the average family size was 3.10.

The median age in the village was 37 years. 30% of residents were under the age of 18; 7.5% were between the ages of 18 and 24; 26.4% were from 25 to 44; 23.6% were from 45 to 64; and 12.6% were 65 years of age or older. The gender makeup of the village was 51.6% male and 48.4% female.

=== 2000 census ===
As of the census of 2000, there were 707 people, 256 households, and 203 families living in the village. The population density was 2,160.6 inhabitants per square mile (834.2/km^{2}). There were 269 housing units at an average density of 822.1 per square mile (317.4/km^{2}). The racial makeup of the village was 98.59% White, 0.28% Native American, and 1.13% from two or more races. Hispanic or Latino people of any race were 0.71% of the population.

There were 256 households, out of which 40.2% had children under the age of 18 living with them, 67.6% were married couples living together, 8.6% had a female householder with no husband present, and 20.7% were non-families. 19.1% of all households were made up of individuals, and 8.2% had someone living alone who was 65 years of age or older. The average household size was 2.76 and the average family size was 3.09.

In the village, the population was spread out, with 29.1% under the age of 18, 5.5% from 18 to 24, 33.0% from 25 to 44, 18.4% from 45 to 64, and 14.0% who were 65 years of age or older. The median age was 34 years. For every 100 females there were 90.6 males. For every 100 females age 18 and over, there were 91.2 males.

The median income for a household in the village was $40,114, and the median income for a family was $43,750. Males had a median income of $36,563 versus $21,176 for females. The per capita income for the village was $16,208. About 3.6% of families and 3.6% of the population were below the poverty line, including 2.3% of those under age 18 and 1.8% of those age 65 or over.

== Education ==
Public education in Amanda is administered by the Amanda Clearcreek Local Schools district. Amanda has a public library, a branch of the Fairfield County District Library.

== Notable people ==
- Thomas Sterling, senator
