= 1904 South Dakota gubernatorial election =

- November 8, 1904
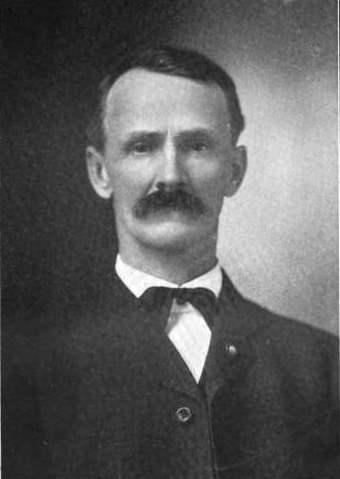

Nominee	Samuel H. Elrod	Louis N. Crill
Party	Republican	Democratic
Popular vote	68,561	24,772
Percentage	68.29%	24.68%
- County results Elrod: 50–60% 60–70% 70–80% 80–90% No Vote
Governor of South Dakota before election
Charles N. Herreid
Republican
Elected Governor of South Dakota
Samuel H. Elrod
Republican

The 1904 South Dakota gubernatorial election was held on November 8, 1904. Incumbent Republican Governor Charles N. Herreid declined to run for re-election to a third term. Clark County State's Attorney Samuel H. Elrod won the Republican nomination to run as Herreid's successor, and he faced Democratic nominee Louis N. Crill, the former president of the state Senate, and former U.S. Congressman Freeman Knowles, the Socialist nominee. For the first time since 1894, the Democratic and Populist Parties nominated separate candidates. Ultimately, the split in the two parties did not prove dispositive; Elrod defeated Crill and the other candidates in a landslide.

== Republican convention ==
In the lead-up to the Republican convention, speculation swirled around several names: Secretary of State O. C. Berg, former Attorney General Coe I. Crawford, State Senator J. E. McDougall, Clark County State's Attorney Samuel H. Elrod, and State Representative H. P. Packard of Spink County. At the convention, however, Elrod emerged as the consensus pick and the other candidates ceased their campaigns. Nonetheless, Crawford was nominated by his supporters and the contest continued; Elrod ended up defeating Crawford, receiving 778 votes to Crawford's 226.

== Democratic conventions ==
At the Democratic convention, former State Senate President Louis N. Crill was nominated by acclamation, receiving his party's nomination. This time, however, the Democratic Party did not fuse with the Populist Party, with the parties nominating separate candidates.

== General election ==
=== Results ===
1904 South Dakota gubernatorial election
Party	Candidate	Votes	%	±%
Republican	Samuel H. Elrod	68,561	68.29%	+3.56%
Democratic	Louis N. Crill	24,772	24.68%	−4.06%
Socialist	Freeman Knowles	3,028	3.02%	−0.50%
Prohibition	W. J. Edgar	2,916	2.90%	−0.11%
Populist	R. C. Warne	1,114	1.11%	—
Majority		43,789	43.62%	+7.62%
Turnout		100,391	100.00%	
Republican hold				
