= Volney, Iowa =

- Unincorporated community
- Location within Iowa Location within the United States
- Coordinates: 43°07′50″N 91°22′25″W
- Country: United States
- State: Iowa
- County: Allamakee
- Elevation: 787 ft (240 m)
- Time zone: UTC-6 (Central (CST))
  - Summer (DST): UTC-5 (CDT)
- Area code: 563
- GNIS feature ID: 462592

Volney is an unincorporated community in Allamakee County, Iowa, United States.

== History ==
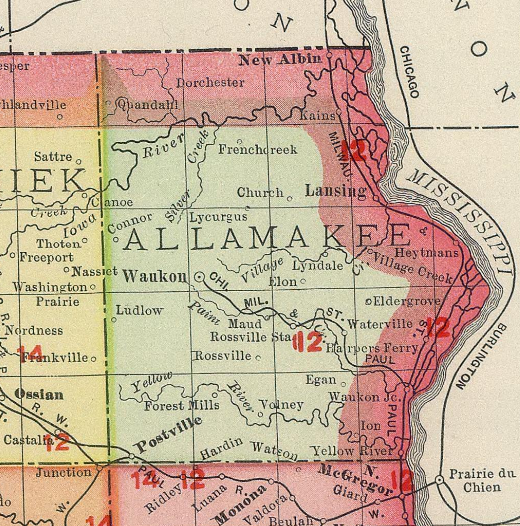
Volney in Allamakee County, Iowa, in 1903

Volney was platted in 1856. By the 1870s, Volney contained gristmills, a sawmill, and a cooperage business. Volney's population was 60 in 1902, and 99 in 1925. The population was 24 in 1940.

== Notable people ==
- Frank M. Byrne, Governor of South Dakota
- Coe I. Crawford, Governor of South Dakota
