= Elrod, South Dakota =

Unincorporated community in South Dakota, U.S.

Coordinates: 44°53′11″N 97°34′25″W

Elrod was a town in Clark County, South Dakota. It was 8 miles (13 km) east of Clark, South Dakota located on two railroads.

Elrod was originally called Ida, becoming Elrod in 1883. The most popular explanation for the town's name is that it is after Samuel H. Elrod, a personal friend of the original owner of the town site, and at one point an attorney in Clark county. However, there are competing explanations: that it was after a local grain merchant named W. S. Elrod; or alternatively that Ida and Elrod were initially two separate towns around stops on two railroads, Ida on the Milwaukee and St. Paul Railroad and (South) Elrod on the Chicago and North Western Railroad, and the latter survived.

In any event, a post office was established as Ida in 1883, and renamed Elrod in 1884. The Elrod Township of Clark county was itself established in 1885.

In 1921 the town had an estimated population of 100; a church, the Methodist Episcopal church whose building was moved to Elrod in 1905 by a team of 4 horses from Garden City where it had been built in 1889, and then from Elrod to a farm in 1933; a bank; a garage; a livery; a billiards hall; a store operated by Joe Maltby, and three grain elevators at the railway depot. The bank, the Bank of Elrod, went bankrupt in 1924, and its building was variously used by Gladys and Lud Nelson's restaurant, and later a dry goods store and millinery. A later store was Thomas and Sons, possibly also operating from the former bank building.

The Elrod Consolidated School was built in 1917, which served 8 grades and 2 years of high school in a brick building that was also used for social events. It closed in 1967 and the brick building demolished around the turn of the 21st century.

The post office closed on 1954-08-31.
