= Robert S. Vessey =

American politician

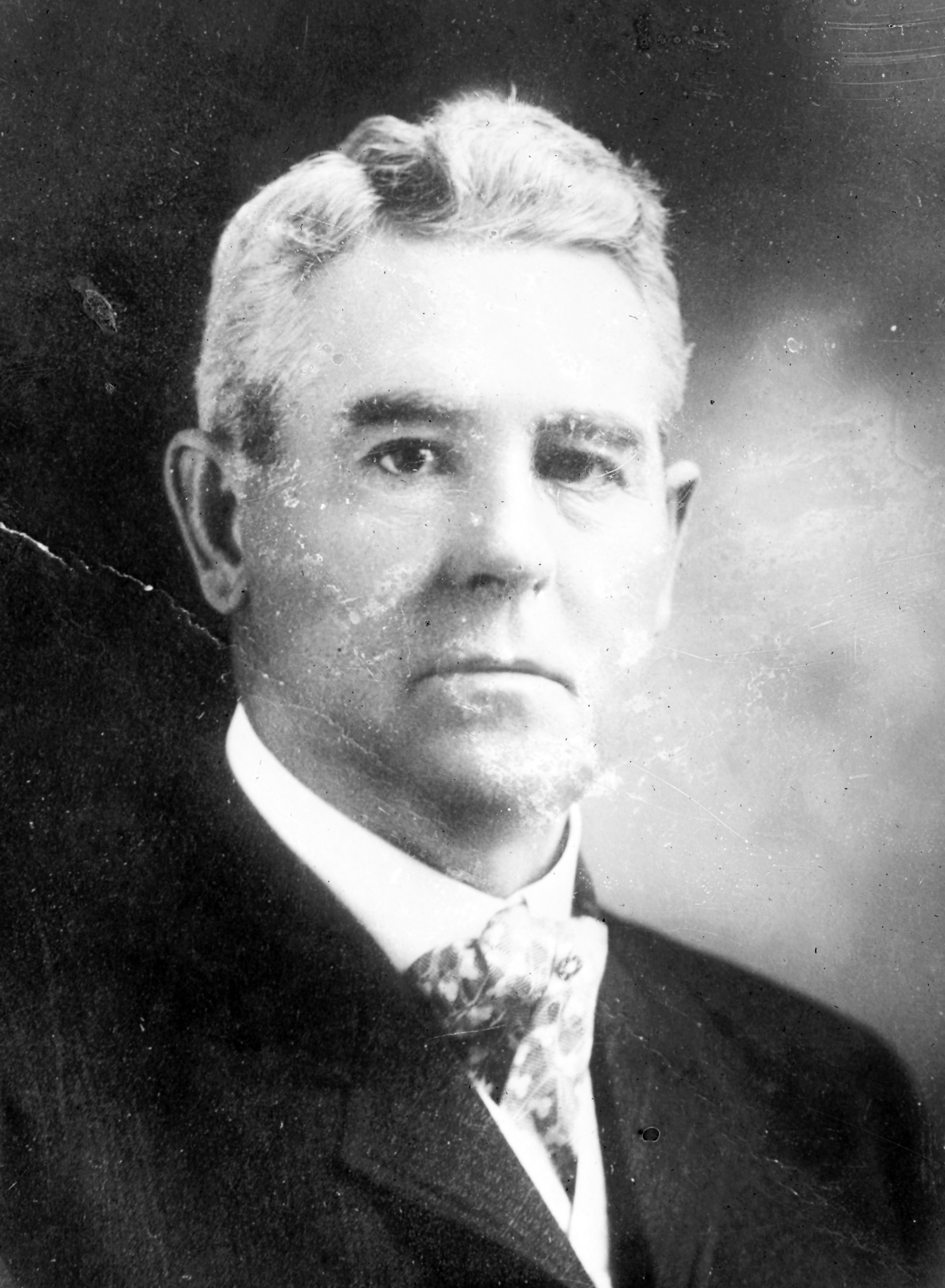

7th Governor of South Dakota
- In office January 5, 1909 – January 7, 1913
- Lieutenant: Howard C. Shober; Frank M. Byrne
- Preceded by: Coe I. Crawford
- Succeeded by: Frank M. Byrne

South Dakota State Senator
- In office 1905–1909

Personal details
- Born: May 16, 1858 Oshkosh, Wisconsin, U.S.
- Died: October 18, 1929 (aged 71) Pasadena, California, U.S.
- Party: Republican
- Spouse: Florence Albert (m. 1882)
- Children: 4
- Profession: Banker; Merchant; Farmer

Robert Scadden Vessey (May 16, 1858 – October 18, 1929) was the seventh governor of South Dakota. Vessey, a Republican from Wessington Springs, served from 1909 to 1913.

== Biography ==
Vessey was born to Charles and Jane Elizabeth Vessey in Oshkosh, Winnebago County, Wisconsin, United States. His father was a Methodist lay preacher; his mother was an English immigrant. Vessey was raised and educated near Oshkosh in Winnebago County, Wisconsin. For a brief time, he studied at Oshkosh Commercial College before spending the next five years as a lumberjack in northern Wisconsin.

Vessey married Florence Albert on August 27, 1882. The couple moved to a "squatters claim" in what is now known as Pleasant Township, Jerauld County, South Dakota. They had four children.

== Career ==
Vessey became a member of the South Dakota Senate in the 1905 and 1907 state legislatures. In January 1908, he was elected president of the senate. Despite limited abilities as a public speaker, he successfully guided Progressive measures through the state senate.

Vessey's candidacy for governor was supported in large part due to his solid record in the state senate. As governor, he worked to keep peace among South Dakota Progressives and sought to enhance control of government through the direct primary law. He was also the first governor to proclaim Mothers' Day as a public observance.

In 1910, Vessey's bid for a second term as governor was threatened by an independent candidate named George W. Egan. In spite of Egan's popularity with voters, Vessey beat both Egan and former governor Samuel H. Elrod to receive the Republican nomination. He went on to defeat the Democratic candidate, Chauncey L. Wood, in the general election. After serving his terms, he moved to Pasadena, California where he owned and operated a real estate business.

== Death ==
Vessey died in Pasadena and was entombed in Mountain View Cemetery in Altadena, California. His house on College Street in Wessington Springs was added to the National Register of Historic Places in 1978, as Robert S. Vessey House.

Party political offices
Preceded by Coe I. Crawford	Republican nominee for Governor of South Dakota; 1908, 1910	Succeeded by Frank M. Byrne
Political offices
Preceded by Coe I. Crawford	Governor of South Dakota; 1909–1913	Succeeded by Frank M. Byrne
