= Frank M. Byrne =

American politician

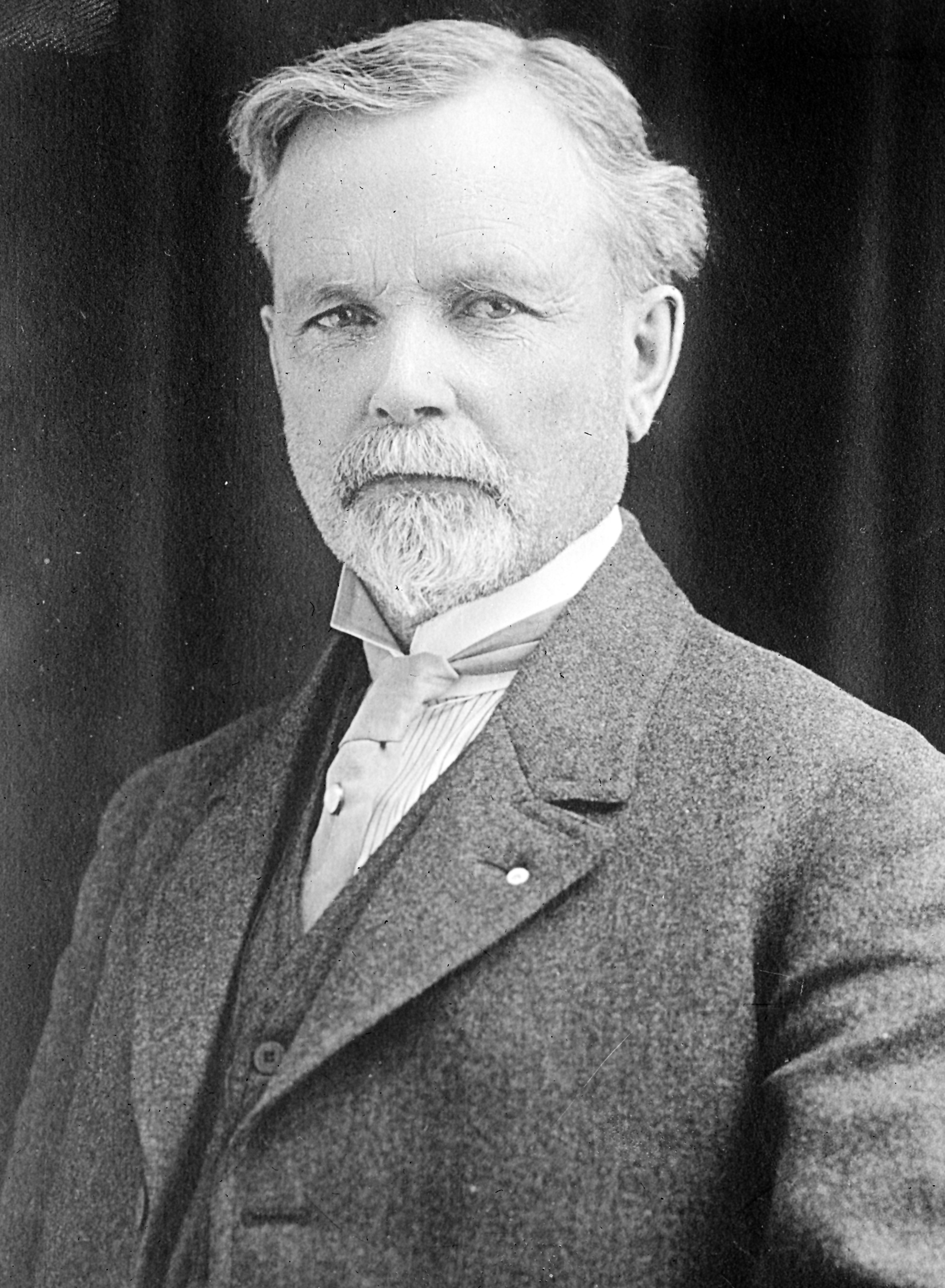

8th Governor of South Dakota
- In office January 7, 1913 – January 2, 1917
- Lieutenant: Howard C. Shober; Frank M. Byrne
- Preceded by: Robert S. Vessey
- Succeeded by: Peter Norbeck

Personal details
- Born: Frank Michael Byrne; October 23, 1858 near Volney, Iowa, U.S.
- Died: December 24, 1927 (aged 69) San Francisco, California, U.S.
- Party: Republican
- Spouse: Emilie Beaver
- Profession: Businessman

Frank Michael Byrne (October 23, 1858 – December 24, 1927) was an American businessman and politician who served as the eighth Governor of South Dakota.

== Biography ==
Byrne was born near Volney, Iowa to Irish immigrants, Michael and Delia (Hart) Byrne. Byrne's formal education was limited to rural school; but, he frequently read books from his own large library. He was married to Emilie (Emma) Beaver and they had five children.

== Career ==
In 1879, he drove a team of oxen to Sioux Falls in what was then Dakota Territory. Byrne worked for homesteaders near Sioux Falls until filing on his own claim in McCook County in 1880. In 1883, he sold his claim and moved to Faulk County to sell insurance. In 1885 and 1886, Byrne spent time in the northern part of Dakota Territory, investing in an insurance company in Fargo and then represented the firm in Faulk and Potter Counties in 1888.

Byrne became involved in politics when officials at Forest City, South Dakota refused to surrender the Potter County records to Gettysburg during a dispute over the site of the county seat. Byrne was one of several men who organized the raiding party, which successfully brought the records to Gettysburg.

In 1889, Byrne held his first political office as state senator from Faulk and Potter Counties but lost the election in 1890. He served as treasurer of Faulk County for four years. Byrne and his former tutor, Coe I. Crawford, became involved with South Dakota's Progressives; and, Byrne represented his district as state senator in 1907 and 1909. From 1911 to 1913, Byrne served as the ninth Lieutenant Governor of South Dakota during Robert S. Vessey's second term as governor.

In March 1913, Byrne became Governor of South Dakota after a hard-fought campaign against Judge James W. McCarter, and went on to serve two terms from 1913 to 1917. In 1914, Byrne won re-election with Peter Norbeck as lieutenant governor. During his tenure, a tax commission was created and a state bank guaranty act was adopted through his persistence.

Byrne completed his second term as governor and returned to Faulkton. In 1918, Byrne ran in the Republican primary for the United States Senate. He lost when Coe Crawford and Peter Norbeck both supported the incumbent, Thomas Sterling. He left politics until 1922, when Governor William H. McMaster appointed him as Commissioner of Agriculture, a position he held until retiring in 1924.

== Death ==
A rheumatic condition forced Byrne to walk with a cane; and, he moved to the milder climates of Oregon and then California. Frank M. Byrne died in San Francisco, California and is interred at Halcyon Cemetery, Halcyon, California.

Party political offices
Preceded by Robert S. Vessey	Republican nominee for Governor of South Dakota; 1912, 1914	Succeeded by Peter Norbeck
Political offices
Preceded by Howard C. Shober	Lieutenant Governor of South Dakota; 1911–1913	Succeeded by E. L. Abel
Preceded by Robert S. Vessey	Governor of South Dakota; 1913–1917	Succeeded by Peter Norbeck
