= 1912 South Dakota gubernatorial election =

- November 5, 1912
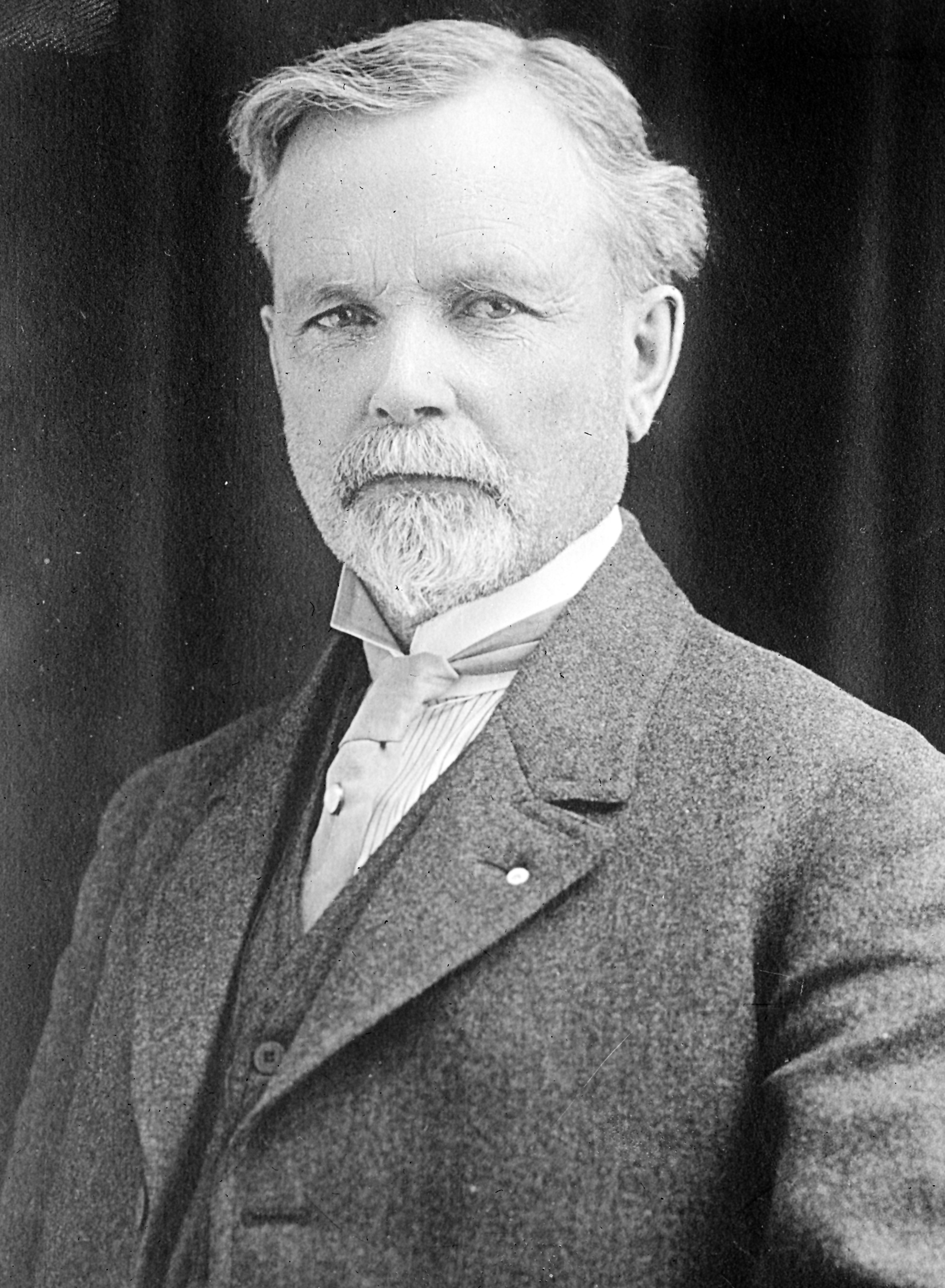

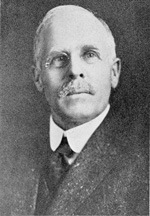
Nominee	Frank M. Byrne	Edwin S. Johnson
Party	Republican	Democratic
Popular vote	57,161	53,850
Percentage	48.51%	45.70%
- County results Byrne: 40–50% 50–60% 60–70% 70–80% Johnson: 40–50% 50–60% 60–70% 70–80% No Vote
Governor before election
Robert S. Vessey
Republican
Elected Governor
Frank M. Byrne
Republican

The 1912 South Dakota gubernatorial election was held on November 5, 1912. Incumbent Republican Governor Robert S. Vessey declined to run for re-election to a third term. Lieutenant Governor Frank M. Byrne won the Republican primary to succeed Vessey, and then faced State Senator Edwin S. Johnson, the Democratic nominee, in the general election. Byrne only narrowly defeated Johnson, winning just 49% of the vote to Johnson's 46%, the closest gubernatorial election since 1898.

== Primary elections ==
Primary elections were held on June 4, 1912.

=== Democratic primary ===
==== Candidates ====
- Edwin S. Johnson, former State Senator
- P. F. Wickhem, former State Senator

==== Results ====
Democratic primary results
Party	Candidate	Votes	%
Democratic	Edwin S. Johnson	7,092	55.32%
Democratic	P. F. Wickhem	5,727	44.68%
Total votes		12,819	100.00%

=== Republican primary ===
==== Candidates ====
- Frank M. Byrne, Lieutenant Governor of South Dakota
- George W. Egan, disbarred attorney, 1910 Republican candidate for Governor
- Loomis S. Cull, Registrar of the Rapid City United States Land Office

==== Results ====
Republican primary results
Party	Candidate	Votes	%
Republican	Frank M. Byrne	38,660	51.74%
Republican	George W. Egan	29,481	39.46%
Republican	Loomis S. Cull	6,576	8.80%
Total votes		74,717	100.00%

=== Prohibition primary ===
==== Candidates ====
- O. W. Butterfield, Prohibition candidate for Governor in 1910

==== Results ====
Prohibition primary results
Party	Candidate	Votes	%
Prohibition	O. W. Butterfield	636	100.00%
Total votes		636	100.00%

=== Socialist primary ===
==== Candidates ====
- Samuel Lovett

==== Results ====
Socialist primary results
Party	Candidate	Votes	%
Socialist	Samuel Lovett	636	100.00%
Total votes		636	100.00%

== General election ==
=== Candidates ===
- Edwin S. Johnson, Democratic
- Frank M. Byrne, Republican
- O. W. Butterfield, Prohibition
- Samuel Lovett, Socialist

=== Results ===
1912 South Dakota gubernatorial election
Party	Candidate	Votes	%	±%
Republican	Frank M. Byrne	57,160	48.51%	−9.84%
Democratic	Edwin S. Johnson	53,850	45.70%	+9.81%
Socialist	Samuel Lovett	3,479	2.95%	—
Prohibition	O. W. Butterfield	3,339	2.83%	−1.42%
Majority		3,310	2.81%	−19.65%
Turnout		117,828	100.00%	
Republican hold				
