= 1920 United States Senate election in South Dakota =

- November 2, 1920
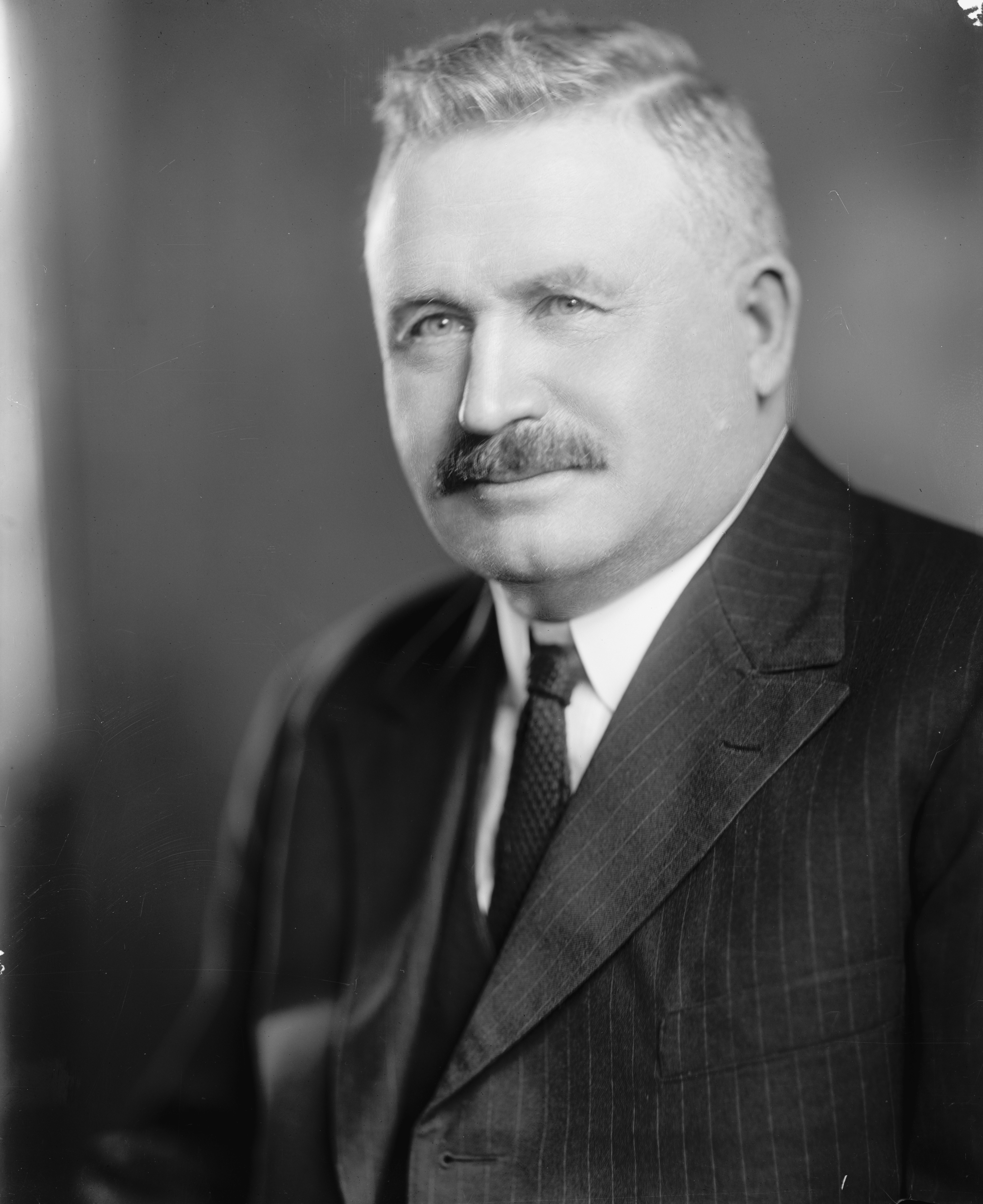

Nominee	Peter Norbeck	Tom Ayres
Party	Republican	Nonpartisan League
Popular vote	92,267	44,309
Percentage	50.10%	24.06%
Nominee	U. S. G. Cherry	R. O. Richards
Party	Democratic	Independent
Popular vote	36,833	10,032
Percentage	20.00%	5.45%
- County results Norbeck: 30–40% 40–50% 50–60% 60–70% Ayres: 30–40% 40–50% 50–60% Richards: 30–40% No Vote
U.S. senator before election
Edwin S. Johnson
Democratic
Elected U.S. Senator
Peter Norbeck
Republican

The 1920 United States Senate election in South Dakota took place on November 2, 1920. Incumbent Democratic Senator Edwin S. Johnson declined to seek re-election to a second term. In the Democratic primary, attorney Ulysses Simpson Grant Cherry defeated former State Senator Louis Napoleon Crill and former U.S. Marshal Tom Taubman, while in the Republican primary, Governor Peter Norbeck defeated former State Supreme Court Justice Dick Haney. In the general election, Cherry and Norbeck faced a litany of independent candidates, including Nonpartisan League candidate Tom Ayres. Benefiting from the split in left-wing candidates, Norbeck won by a wide margin, with Ayres narrowly beating out Cherry for second place.

== Democratic primary ==
=== Candidates ===
- Ulysses Simpson Grant Cherry, Sioux Falls attorney
- Louis Napoleon Crill, former President Pro Tempore of the State Senate
- Tom Taubman, former U.S. Marshal for the District of South Dakota

=== Results ===
Democratic primary
Party	Candidate	Votes	%
Democratic	Ulysses Simpson Grant Cherry	2,821	38.64%
Democratic	Louis Napoleon Crill	2,675	36.64%
Democratic	Tom Taubman	1,805	24.72%
Total votes		7,301	100.00%

== Republican primary ==
=== Candidates ===
- Peter Norbeck, Governor of South Dakota
- Dick Haney, former South Dakota Supreme Court Justice

=== Results ===
Republican primary
Party	Candidate	Votes	%
Republican	Peter Norbeck	43,893	58.71%
Republican	Dick Haney	30,870	41.29%
Total votes		74,763	100.00%

== General election ==
=== Results ===
1920 United States Senate election in South Dakota
Party	Candidate	Votes	%	±%
Republican	Peter Norbeck	92,267	50.10%	+5.63%
Nonpartisan League	Tom Ayres	44,309	24.06%	—
Democratic	U. S. G. Cherry	36,833	20.00%	−28.32%
Independent	R. O. Richards	10,032	5.45%	—
Independent	L. J. Manbeck	738	0.40%	—
Majority		47,958	26.04%	+22.19%
Turnout		184,179		
Republican gain from Democratic				
