= Robert Dollard =

American attorney and politician

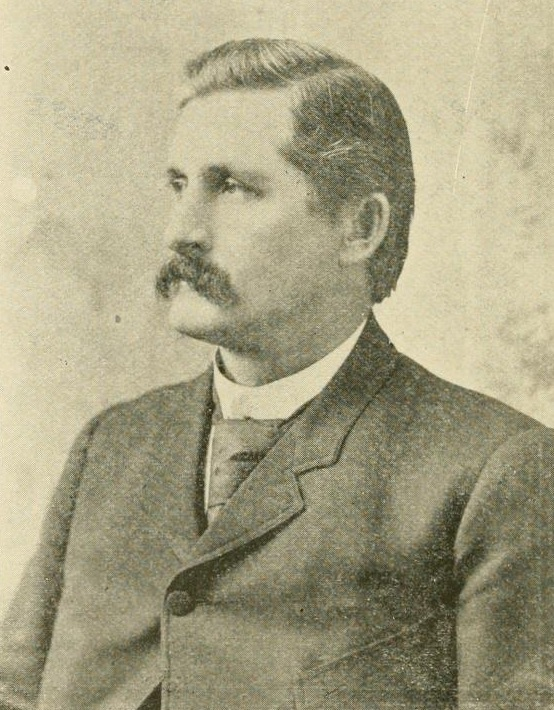
- Frontispiece of 1906's Recollections of the Civil War and Going West to Grow Up with the Country by Robert Dollard

1st Attorney General of South Dakota
- In office 1889–1893
- Governor: Arthur C. Mellette
- Preceded by: None (position established)
- Succeeded by: Coe I. Crawford

Member of the South Dakota House of Representatives from the 7th District
- In office 1897–1899 Serving with Christ Bangart
- Preceded by: Joseph Leach, J. O. Smith
- Succeeded by: James H. Baskin, George B. Trumbo

Member of the South Dakota Senate from the 4th District
- In office 1893–1895
- Preceded by: R. N. Stout
- Succeeded by: James H. Stephens

Personal details
- Born: March 14, 1842 Fall River, Massachusetts
- Died: April 28, 1912 (aged 70) Santa Monica, California
- Resting place: Rose Hill Cemetery, Scotland, South Dakota
- Party: Republican
- Spouse: Carrie E. Dunn (m. 1875-1912, his death)
- Children: 2
- Occupation: Attorney

Military service
- Allegiance: United States (Union)
- Branch/service: Union Army
- Years of service: 1861–1866
- Rank: Major
- Unit: 4th Massachusetts Volunteer Militia; 23rd Massachusetts Volunteer Infantry Regiment; 2nd United States Colored Cavalry Regiment
- Battles/wars: American Civil War

Robert Dollard (March 14, 1842 - April 28, 1912) was an American attorney and politician. A native of Massachusetts, he was a Union Army veteran of the American Civil War and attained the rank of major. After the war, he moved to Illinois, where he studied law and was admitted to the bar. He later moved to South Dakota and served as its first attorney general.

== Early life ==
Dollard was born in Fall River, Massachusetts, on March 14, 1842, the son of Thomas Dollard and Mary (Collyer) Dollard. His mother died when he was two years old, and his father soon remarried. Dollard was raised by his father and stepmother Ann, and according to an 1855 state census, his siblings included an older sister named Mary and a younger half-sister named Elisabeth. Dollard was educated through the high school grades in the public schools of Fall River and Stoughton and by the time of the 1860 federal census, Mary and Robert Dollard were living in Easton, Massachusetts, where Mary worked in a thread factory and Robert was employed as a moulder.

== American Civil War ==
On April 16, 1861, Dollard enlisted as a private in Company B, 4th Massachusetts Volunteer Militia. During the regiment's three months of Union Army service at the start of the American Civil War, it performed garrison duty at Fort Monroe and took part in the Battle of Big Bethel. The 4th Massachusetts Volunteers were mustered out in late July, and in September Dollard returned to service when he enlisted in Company E, 23rd Massachusetts Volunteer Infantry Regiment. He attained the rank of sergeant before receiving his commission as a second lieutenant, and he later received promotion to first lieutenant. The 23rd Massachusetts was part of Burnside's North Carolina Expedition, and engagements in which Dollard took part included the battles of Roanoke Island, New Bern, and Fort Macon.

Following the North Carolina expedition, the 23rd Massachusetts was part of a Union force sent to South Carolina, where it performed occupation duty before returning to North Carolina to perform occupation duty there. In the summer of 1863, the 23rd Massachusetts left North Carolina and bivouacked at Fort Monroe, Virginia.

Dollard left the 23rd Massachusetts in December 1863 for promotion to captain in the 2nd United States Colored Cavalry Regiment. Battles in which Dollard was a participant included the Siege of Suffolk and Second Battle of Suffolk, and the Siege of Petersburg.

In September 1864, Dollard received a head wound during the Battle of Chaffin's Farm, and his heroism and coolness under fire while directing troops to maintain their lines resulted in his promotion to major. After the war ended, Dollard's regiment performed occupation duty in Texas, and he was mustered out at Brazos Island on February 12, 1866. After the war, Dollard was an active member of the Grand Army of the Republic, Military Order of the Loyal Legion of the United States and other veterans groups. He took part in numerous reunions and other public events to commemorate the war, and published several newspaper articles and other writings about his experiences.

== Post-Civil War ==
After the war, Dollard decided to move to Chicago and go into business with a friend and former officer who had served with him during the war. They moved from Chicago to Galesburg, but soon had a falling out. Dollard traveled to San Antonio, Texas and New Orleans, Louisiana in search of other opportunities, but returned to Galesburg several months later to begin studying law with a local attorney. He was admitted to the bar in 1870 and practiced throughout Knox, Peoria, and Fulton Counties. In 1876 he was the unsuccessful Democratic candidate for State's Attorney of Knox County.

== Move to Dakota Territory ==
In 1878, Dollard traded parcels with another landowner and later that year he visited the one he had acquired in the Dakota Territory. Deciding to relocate to Dakota in 1879, Dollard filed for five claims under the Homestead Acts in what is now Douglas County, South Dakota, where he began to farm. According to the records of the U.S. Land Office, Dollard was the first permanent settler in the county. While farming most of the year, Dollard resided in Scotland, South Dakota during the winter and practiced law, including travel to the territorial capital of Yankton for trials.

== Continued career ==
In 1881, Dollard gave up farming and settled in Scotland, where he developed a law practice that covered Bon Homme, Hutchinson, and several adjoining counties. By now a Republican, Dollard was elected to several local offices and participated in the statehood conventions of 1883 and 1885. In 1883, he received appointment as U.S. Commissioner for the Second Judicial District. In 1884, he was elected State's Attorney of Bon Homme County and he was chosen to serve as attorney general of South Dakota's interim state government in 1885. In 1888, Dollard was elected to the Territorial Council, the upper house of the legislature, and he served until South Dakota attained statehood in November 1889.

In 1889, he was elected as the first state attorney general and he was reelected in 1890. In 1892, Dollard was an unsuccessful candidate for the Republican nomination for governor. Later that year he was elected to a term in South Dakota Senate and in 1896 he won a term in the South Dakota House of Representatives. In 1898, Dollard was an unsuccessful candidate for Congress at the state Republican convention; the nominations were won by Charles H. Burke and Robert J. Gamble, who went on to win the general election. During the Spanish–American War, Dollard undertook recruiting efforts in South Dakota, and succeeded in raising 1,200 volunteers for the army.

== Later life ==
In 1905, Dollard left South Dakota and settled in Santa Monica, California, where he lived in retirement. His wife and he traveled extensively throughout the western United States as tourists. In 1909, he entered the race for mayor of Santa Monica, but he withdrew his candidacy before election day.

== Death ==
He died in Santa Monica on April 28, 1912. He was buried at Rose Hill Cemetery in Scotland, South Dakota.

== Family ==
In 1875, Dollard married Carrie E. Dunn of Yates City, Illinois. She was a school teacher and librarian, activist for women's suffrage, and participant in other civic causes; in addition to serving as the first teacher in Scotland's public school, she organized and managed the town's library for many years. They were the parents of a son, Archie, who they adopted when he was an infant, and who died at the age of nine. A daughter, Maud, was born and died in 1889.

== Sources ==
=== Books ===
- Burdette, Robert J. (1910). American Biography and Genealogy, California Edition. Vol. 2. Chicago, IL: Lewis Publishing Company.
- Burdette, Robert J. (1910). Greater Los Angeles & Southern California: Portraits & Personal Memoranda. Chicago, IL: Lewis Publishing Company.
- Chapman, Chas. C. & Co. (1878). History of Knox County, Illinois. Chicago, IL: Blakely, Brown & Marsh. p. 421.
- Dollard, Robert (1906). Recollections of the Civil War and Going West to Grow Up with the Country. Scotland, SD: Robert Dollard.
- Executive Committee (April 14, 1900). Souvenir Program, Association of Mass. Minute Men of '61: Celebration of the Thirty-Ninth Anniversary. Boston, MA: Geo. W. Nason.
- Biographical Directory of the South Dakota Legislature, 1889-1989: A-K. Pierre, SD: South Dakota Legislative Council. 1989.

=== Internet ===
- State of Massachusetts (1855). "Massachusetts State Census, Entry for Robert Dollard". Ancestry.com. Lehi, UT: Ancestry.com LLC.
- State of Massachusetts (1860). "United States Census, Entry for Robert Dollard". Ancestry.com. Lehi, UT: Ancestry.com LLC.

=== Newspapers ===
- "Territorial Topics: Major Robert Dollard". Miner Sentinel. Miner, SD. January 12, 1883. p. 8 – via GenealogyBank.com.
- "Biographical: Territorial Officers; Robert Dollard". The Bismarck Tribune. Bismarck, ND. January 11, 1889 – via Newspapers.com.
- "Our Legislature: Resolutions of Sympathy on the Death of Dollard's Daughter Were Passed". Rapid City Journal. Rapid City, SD. January 27, 1889 – via Newspapers.com.
- "The Republican Congressmen and Republican State Ticket Elected". The Daily Argus-Leader. Sioux Falls, SD. November 9, 1898 – via Newspapers.com.
- "Dollard Out of Race". Los Angeles Herald. Los Angeles, CA. December 7, 1909 – via Newspapers.com.

Party political offices
First	Republican nominee for Attorney General of South Dakota; 1889, 1890	Succeeded by Coe I. Crawford
Legal offices
Preceded by new office	Attorney General of South Dakota; 1889–1893	Succeeded by Coe I. Crawford
