= 1906 South Dakota gubernatorial election =

- November 6, 1906
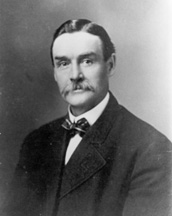

| Nominee | Coe I. Crawford | John A. Stransky |
| Party | Republican | Democratic |
| Popular vote | 48,709 | 19,923 |
| Percentage | 65.32% | 26.72% |
- County results Crawford: 40–50% 50–60% 60–70% 70–80% 80–90% Stransky: 50–60% No Vote
Governor of South Dakota before election
Samuel H. Elrod
Republican
Elected Governor of South Dakota
Coe I. Crawford
Republican

The 1906 South Dakota gubernatorial election was held on November 6, 1906. Incumbent Republican Governor Samuel H. Elrod ran for re-election, but was defeated for renomination at the Republican convention by former Attorney General Coe I. Crawford. In the general election, Crawford was opposed by the Democratic nominee, former State Representative John A. Stransky of Brule County. Crawford had little difficulty defeating Stransky in a landslide, largely matching Elrod's margin of victory from two years earlier.

== Republican convention ==
In January 1906, former Attorney General Coe I. Crawford, who unsuccessfully ran for Governor in 1904, announced that he would challenge Governor Samuel H. Elrod for renomination, queueing up a contest between the insurgent wing of the party, led by U.S. Senator Robert J. Gamble, and the stalwart wing of the party, also referred to as the "machine." As county delegates were elected to the convention, Crawford-affiliated delegates won a clear majority, though both sides claimed that they would win. In the end, however, Crawford defeated Elrod at the convention by a wide margin, winning 893 votes to Elrod's 476, with Crawford's political allies winning the convention's nomination, as well.

== Democratic conventions ==
In the weeks leading to the Democratic convention in June 1906, no clear frontrunner for the Party's nomination emerged. Former Governor Andrew E. Lee was mentioned as a possibility, though he declined to run. Former Hughes County Sheriff and former Deputy U.S. Marshal Ben Ash and former State Representative John A. Stransky were the other two potential candidates. Stransky ended up winning the nomination.

== General election ==
=== Results ===
1904 South Dakota gubernatorial special election
| Party | Candidate | Votes | % | ±% |
|---|---|---|---|---|
| Republican | Coe I. Crawford | 48,709 | 65.32% | −2.98% |
| Democratic | John A. Stransky | 19,923 | 26.72% | +2.04% |
| Prohibition | Knute Lewis | 3,398 | 4.56% | +1.65% |
| Socialist | Freeman Knowles | 2,542 | 3.41% | +0.39% |
| Majority | | 28,786 | 38.60% | −5.02% |
| Turnout | | 74,572 | 100.00% | |
| Republican hold | | | | |
