= 1926 United States Senate election in South Dakota =

- November 2, 1926
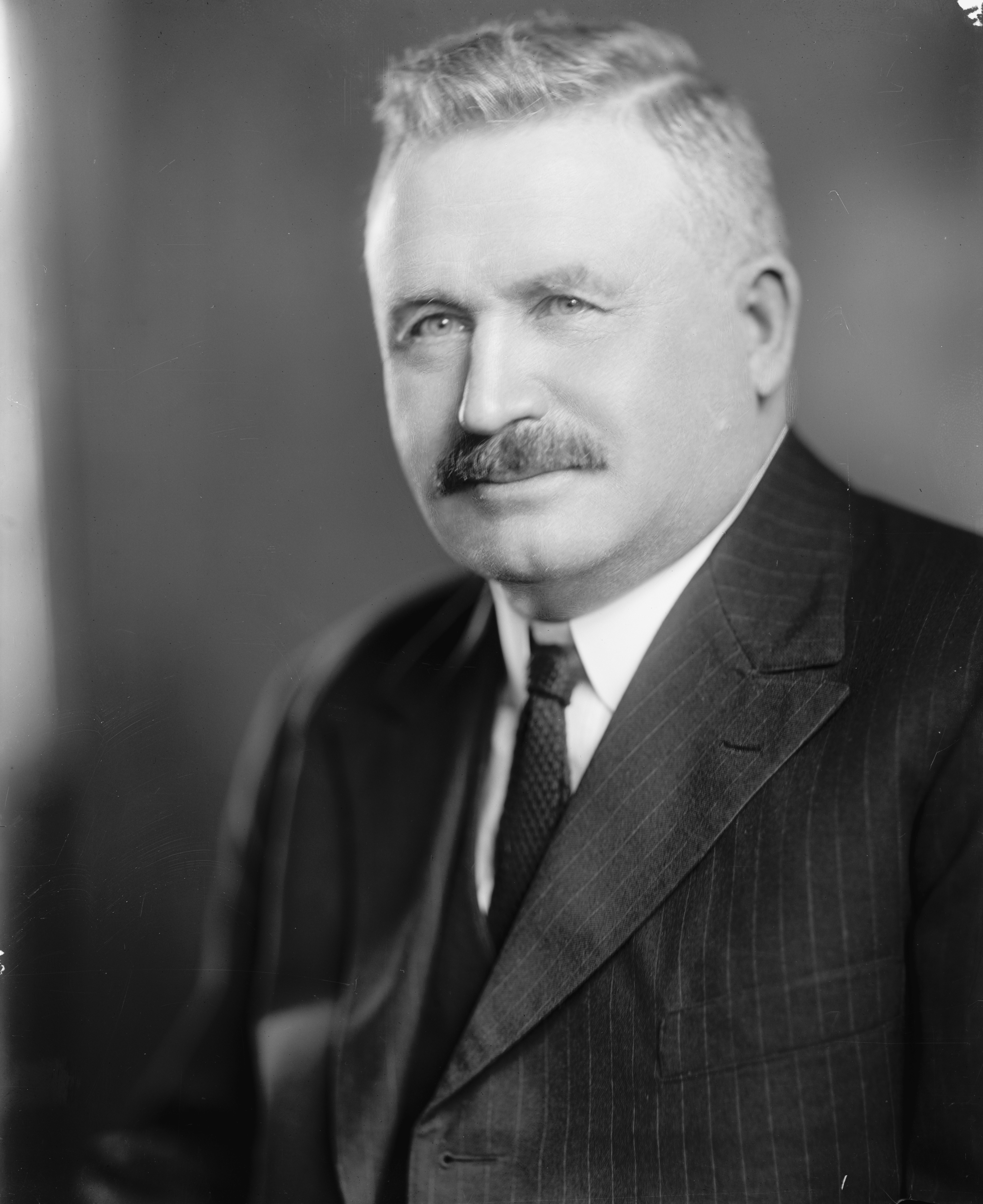

Nominee	Peter Norbeck	Charles J. Gunderson	Howard Platt
Party	Republican	Democratic	Farmer–Labor
Popular vote	105,756	59,128	12,797
Percentage	59.52%	33.28%	7.20%
- County results Norbeck: 40–50% 50–60% 60–70% 70–80% 80–90% Gunderson: 40–50% No Vote
U.S. senator before election
Peter Norbeck
Republican
Elected U.S. Senator
Peter Norbeck
Republican

The 1926 United States Senate election in South Dakota took place on November 2, 1926. Incumbent Republican Senator Peter Norbeck ran for re-election to a second term. In the Republican primary, he faced former State Senator George J. Danforth, who had the support of Governor Carl Gunderson in an intra-party split between Norbeck and Gunderson. Norbeck defeated Danforth by a wide margin, and then faced former State Representative Charles J. Gunderson in the general election. Norbeck defeated Gunderson in a landslide to win re-election.

== Democratic primary ==
Former State Representative Charles J. Gunderson won the Democratic nomination unopposed.

== Republican primary ==
=== Candidates ===
- Peter Norbeck, incumbent U.S. Senator
- George J. Danforth, former State Senator

=== Results ===
Republican primary
Party	Candidate	Votes	%
Republican	Peter Norbeck (inc.)	52,937	68.56%
Republican	George J. Danforth	24,271	31.44%
Total votes		77,208	100.00%

== General election ==
=== Results ===
1920 United States Senate election in South Dakota
Party	Candidate	Votes	%	±%
Republican	Peter Norbeck (inc.)	105,756	59.52%	+9.42%
Democratic	Carl J. Gunderson	59,128	33.28%	+13.28%
Farmer–Labor	Howard Platt	12,797	7.20%	—
Majority		46,628	26.24%	+0.20%
Turnout		177,681		
Republican hold				
