= Samuel H. Elrod =

American politician

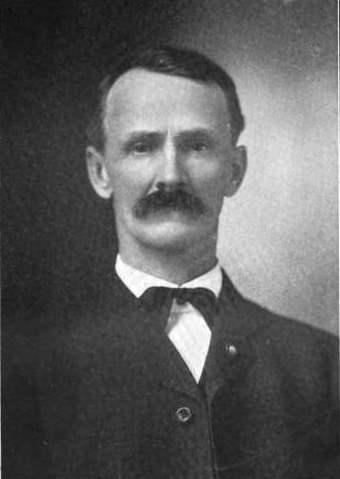

5th Governor of South Dakota
- In office January 3, 1905 – January 8, 1907
- Preceded by: Charles N. Herreid
- Succeeded by: Coe I. Crawford

Personal details
- Born: May 1, 1856 near Coatesville, Indiana, U.S.
- Died: July 13, 1935 (aged 79) Clark, South Dakota, U.S.
- Party: Republican
- Spouse: Mary Ellen Masten
- Children: 2
- Education: DePauw University
- Profession: Attorney; Farmer

Samuel Harrison Elrod (May 1, 1856 – July 13, 1935) was an American attorney and the fifth Governor of South Dakota. Elrod, a Republican from Clark, South Dakota, served from 1905 to 1907.

== Biography ==
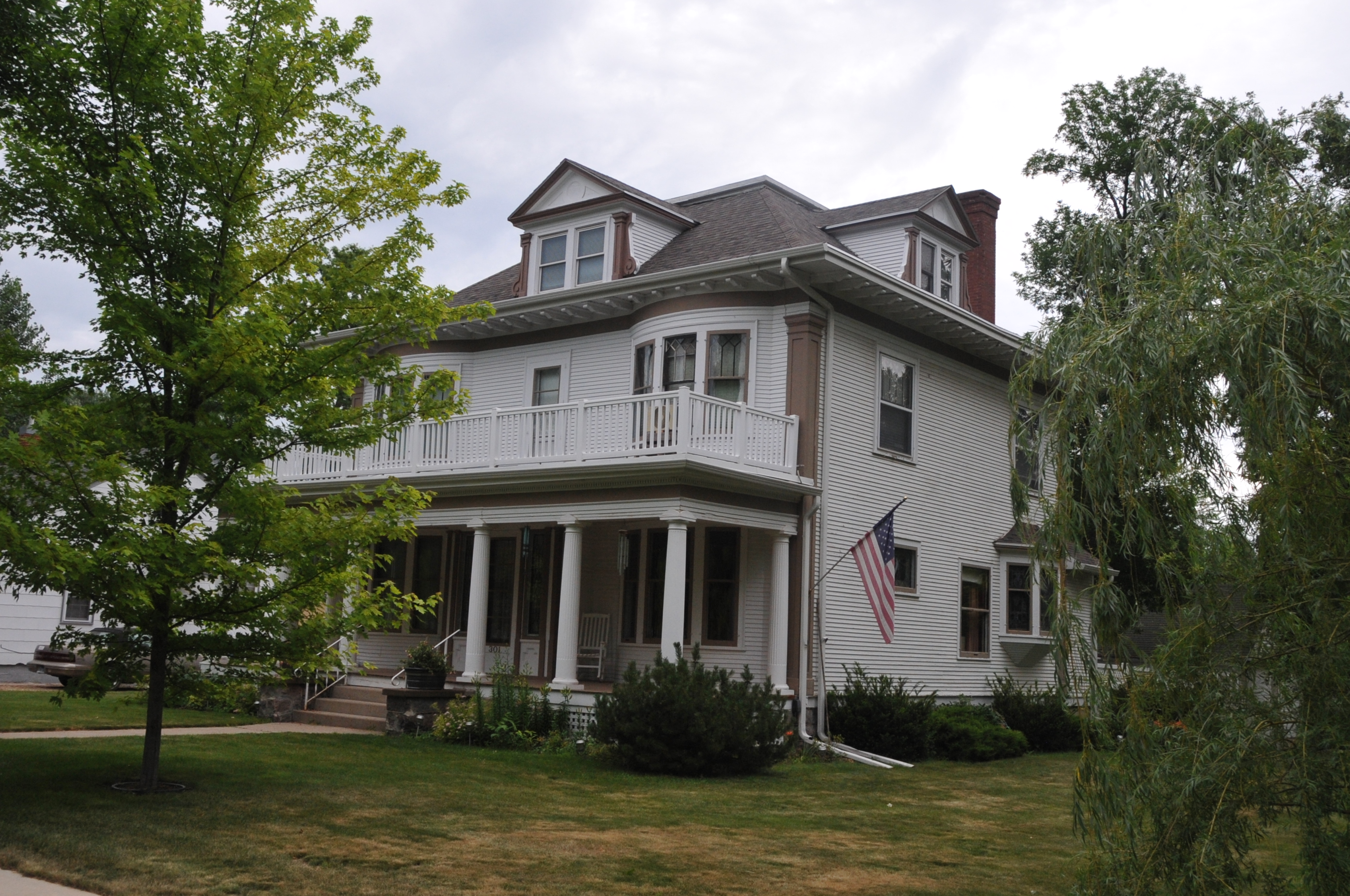
Governor Elrod's house in Clark, South Dakota

Elrod was born in Coatesville, Indiana. He attended public school in Coatesville and graduated from DePauw University in 1882. He then studied law. Elrod married Mary Ellen Masten and they had two children.

== Career ==
Elrod moved to Clark, Dakota Territory and practiced law, was a real estate broker, and a farmer. He served as a member of the Sioux Falls Constitutional Convention in 1883, as Clark County (Dakota Territory) Attorney in 1884, as Clerk Postmaster from 1885 to 1887, as State Attorney from 1887 to 1897, and as U.S. Bureau of Indian Affairs Disbursing Agent to Sisseton and Wahpeton tribes from 1892 until 1900.

A successful Republican nominee, Elrod was elected Governor of South Dakota four years later. He continued the policies of his predecessor-Charles Herreid-controlling political party machinery in South Dakota. During his tenure, he served as chairman of the building committee for the state capitol.

Elrod did not seek reelection. Following his term as governor, he practiced law and farmed near Clark, South Dakota.

== Death and legacy ==
Elrod died July 13, 1935, and is interred at Rose Hill Cemetery, Clark, South Dakota. The town of Elrod in Clark County was named for him.

Party political offices
Preceded by Charles N. Herreid	Republican nominee for Governor of South Dakota; 1904	Succeeded by Coe I. Crawford
Political offices
Preceded by Charles N. Herreid	Governor of South Dakota; 1905–1907	Succeeded by Coe I. Crawford
