= Edwin S. Johnson =

American politician

Edwin Stockton Johnson
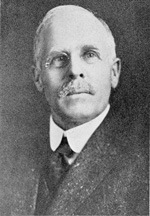

United States Senator from South Dakota
- In office March 4, 1915 – March 3, 1921
- Preceded by: Coe I. Crawford
- Succeeded by: Peter Norbeck

Member of the South Dakota Senate
- In office 1894-1895

Personal details
- Born: February 26, 1857 Owen County, Indiana
- Died: July 19, 1933 (aged 76) Platte, South Dakota
- Party: Democratic

Edwin Stockton Johnson (February 26, 1857 – July 19, 1933) was a United States senator from South Dakota.

== Biography ==
Born in Owen County, Indiana, near Spencer, he moved with his parents to Osceola, Iowa, in 1857 and attended the public schools. He engaged in the mercantile business, and moved to Wheeler County, Nebraska, in 1880 where he homesteaded and engaged in agricultural pursuits.

He returned to Osceola in 1881 and was employed as a bank cashier; in 1884, he moved to South Dakota and established the Citizens' Bank of Grand View, South Dakota, and also engaged in agricultural pursuits. He later established a number of banks in South Dakota, Minnesota, and Iowa. He studied law, was admitted to the bar in 1888 and practiced; he was prosecuting attorney of Douglas County in 1892–1893 and was a member of the South Dakota State Senate in 1894–1895.

He retired from the banking business in 1902 and engaged in the real estate and loan business at Platte, South Dakota; he was a member of the Democratic National Committee from 1904 to 1916.

Johnson was an unsuccessful Democratic candidate for governor in 1912, but was elected as a Democrat to the U.S. Senate in 1914 and served from March 4, 1915, to March 3, 1921. He was the first senator popularly elected from South Dakota and also the first Democrat to represent South Dakota in the Senate. He retired from the Senate after his first term. While in the Senate, Johnson was chairman of the Committee on Revolutionary Claims (Sixty-fourth and Sixty-fifth Congresses).

He resumed his activities in the real estate and loan business and died in Platte in 1933. Interment was in Pleasant Ridge Cemetery, Armour, South Dakota.

Party political offices
| Preceded by Chauncey L. Wood | Democratic nominee for Governor of South Dakota; 1912 | Succeeded by James W. McCarter |
| First | Democratic nominee for U.S. Senator from South Dakota (Class 3); 1914 | Succeeded by U. S. G. Cherry |
U.S. Senate
| Preceded by Coe I. Crawford | U.S. senator (Class 3) from South Dakota; 1915–1921; Served alongside: Thomas Sterling | Succeeded by Peter Norbeck |
