= George W. Egan =

American lawyer

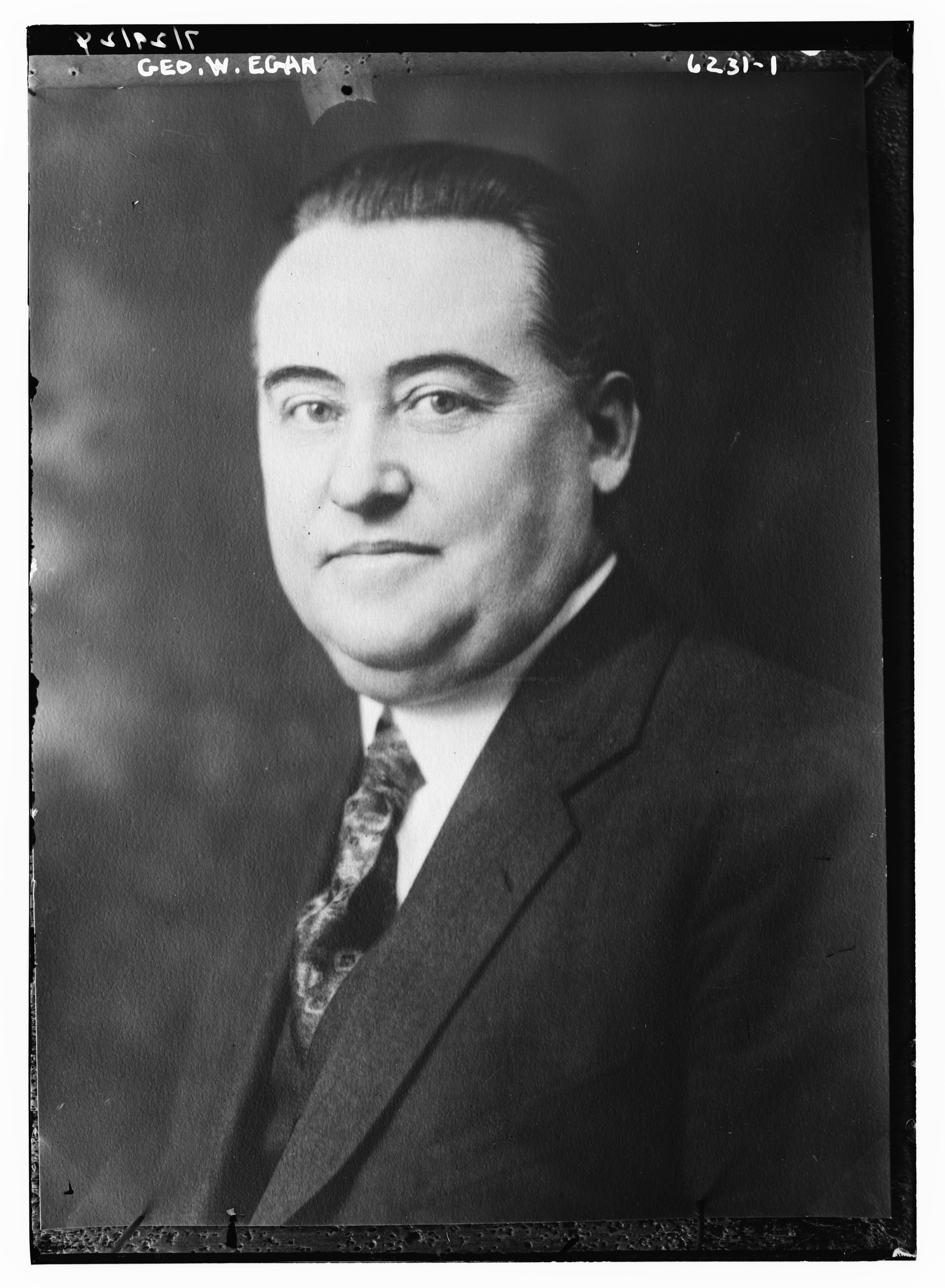
George W. Egan in 1924

George W. Egan was an American attorney. He was a colorful and controversial political figure from Sioux Falls, South Dakota.

George Egan threatened the attempt by Robert S. Vessey to receive the Republican nomination for Governor of South Dakota in 1910. In spite of controversy, Egan became very popular among voters. He claimed to be the first honest man to run for governor. Egan promised to oust Crawford and Vessey, claiming that Vessey had increased the state's debt by $600,000. However, Egan obtained only 21,446 votes to Vessey's 26,732.

== Works ==
- Address Delivered by Hon. George W. Egan of Sioux Falls, South Dakota, Before the Supreme Court in His Own Defense and in Defense of His Right to Practice Law in South Dakota. Egan Campaign Committee. 1909.
