= Coe I. Crawford =

American attorney and politician (1858–1944)

Coe Isaac Crawford
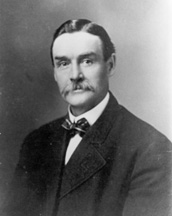

United States Senator from South Dakota
- In office March 4, 1909 – March 3, 1915
- Preceded by: Alfred B. Kittredge
- Succeeded by: Edwin S. Johnson

6th Governor of South Dakota
- In office January 8, 1907 – January 5, 1909
- Lieutenant: Howard C. Shober
- Preceded by: Samuel H. Elrod
- Succeeded by: Robert S. Vessey

2nd Attorney General of South Dakota
- In office 1893–1897
- Governor: Charles H. Sheldon
- Preceded by: Robert Dollard
- Succeeded by: Melvin Grigsby

Member of the South Dakota Senate from the 24th District
- In office 1889–1893
- Preceded by: None (position created)
- Succeeded by: Harry R. Horner

Personal details
- Born: January 14, 1858 Allamakee County, Iowa
- Died: April 25, 1944 (aged 86) Yankton, South Dakota
- Resting place: Oakland Cemetery, Iowa City, Iowa
- Party: Republican
- Spouses: May Robinson; Lavinia Robinson
- Education: University of Iowa
- Occupation: Attorney

Coe Isaac Crawford (January 14, 1858 – April 25, 1944) was an American attorney and politician from South Dakota. He served as the sixth governor and as a U.S. senator.

== Biography ==
A native of Volney, Iowa, Crawford graduated from the University of Iowa College of Law in 1882 and practiced law in Independence, Iowa before moving to Pierre, Dakota Territory in 1883. Active in politics as a Republican, Crawford served as Hughes County's prosecuting attorney in 1887 and 1888. In 1889, he was elected to the Territorial Council, the upper house of Dakota Territory's legislature. After South Dakota achieved statehood in 1889, Crawford served in the South Dakota State Senate, and was Attorney General of South Dakota from 1893 to 1897.

In 1906, Crawford was the successful Republican nominee for governor, and he served from 1907 to 1909. In 1908, he ran successfully for a seat in the U.S. Senate. Crawford served one term, 1909 to 1915, and was an unsuccessful candidate for renomination in 1914. After leaving the Senate, Crawford resumed practicing law in Huron, South Dakota. He practiced until 1934, when he retired. Crawford died in Yankton, South Dakota in 1944, and was buried at Oakland Cemetery in Iowa City, Iowa.

== Early life and education ==
Crawford was born by Volney, in Allamakee County, Iowa. He attended the common schools and received additional instruction from a private tutor. In 1882, he graduated from the University of Iowa College of Law with a LL.B. degree. He began his practice in Independence, Iowa, moving to Pierre, in what was the Dakota Territory, in 1883. He was twice married; firstly to May Robinson and then to Lavinia Robinson. He had five children.

== Career ==
He was the prosecuting attorney for Hughes County, South Dakota in 1887 and 1888. In 1889, he was elected to the Territorial Council, the upper house of the Dakota Territorial Legislature.

When South Dakota was admitted as a state in 1889, he was elected as a member of the first South Dakota State Senate. He went on to serve as the state Attorney General from 1893 to 1897. He ran for the United States House of Representatives seat for South Dakota in 1896, but lost the election. He then moved to Huron, South Dakota, and served as an attorney for the Chicago & North Western Railway from 1897 to 1903, when he resigned.

He was elected as a Republican to the position of Governor of South Dakota in 1906, and served in that capacity through 1909. He ran for the United States Senate that year, and won the election. He served in the Senate through 1915, and lost his bid for renomination in 1914. He then returned to Huron and the practice of law until 1934, when he retired from active business and political life.

== Death ==
He died in Yankton, South Dakota in 1944. His burial was in Oakland Cemetery, Iowa City, Iowa.

Party political offices
| Preceded by Robert Dollard | Republican nominee for Attorney General of South Dakota; 1892, 1894 | Succeeded by S.V. Jones |
| Preceded by Samuel H. Elrod | Republican nominee for Governor of South Dakota; 1906 | Succeeded by Robert S. Vessey |
Legal offices
| Preceded by Robert Dollard | Attorney General of South Dakota; 1893–1897 | Succeeded by Melvin Grigsby |
Political offices
| Preceded by Samuel H. Elrod | Governor of South Dakota; 1907–1909 | Succeeded by Robert S. Vessey |
U.S. Senate
| Preceded by Alfred B. Kittredge | United States Senator (Class 3) from South Dakota; 1909–1915; Served alongside: Robert J. Gamble | Succeeded by Edwin S. Johnson |
