= National Register of Historic Places listings in Beadle County, South Dakota =

Location of Beadle County in South Dakota

This is a list of the National Register of Historic Places listings in Beadle County, South Dakota.

This is intended to be a complete list of the properties and districts on the National Register of Historic Places in Beadle County, South Dakota, United States. The locations of National Register properties and districts for which the latitude and longitude coordinates are included below, may be seen in a map.

There are 27 properties and districts listed on the National Register in the county.

This National Park Service list is complete through NPS recent listings posted May 1, 2026.

== Current listings ==
	Name on the Register	Image	Date listed	Location	City or town	Description
1	Anderson Barn		August 15, 2003 (#03000763)	19411 394th Street; 44°34′29″N 98°20′35″W	Hitchcock	
2	Archeological Site No. 39BE3		August 6, 1993 (#93000802)	Address restricted	Wolsey	
3	Faye Bowden-Agnus Saunders House	Faye Bowden-Agnus Saunders House	December 2, 1998 (#98001401)	669 Dakota Ave., N. 44°22′26″N 98°12′52″W	Huron	
4	Campbell Park Historic District of Huron	Campbell Park Historic District of Huron	November 5, 1974 (#74001888)	Roughly bounded by 5th, 7th, 9th, Wisconsin, California, Kansas, and Dakota Sts. Boundary decrease (listed March 27, 2012, refnum 12000269): Roughly bounded by 5th St. SW, 9th St. SW, Wisconsin Ave. SW and Oregon Ave. SE; 44°21′16″N 98°12′49″W	Huron	
5	Chicago and North Western Roundhouse	Chicago and North Western Roundhouse	November 19, 1998 (#98001411)	North of 1st St. 44°21′57″N 98°12′21″W	Huron	
6	Dairy Building		January 25, 1990 (#90001642)	Off 3rd St. near the South Dakota State Fair Grounds; 44°21′47″N 98°13′47″W	Huron	
7	Hattie O. and Henry Drake Octagon House	Hattie O. and Henry Drake Octagon House	January 30, 1992 (#91002045)	605 3rd St., SW. 44°21′49″N 98°13′26″W	Huron	
8	Grace Episcopal Church	Grace Episcopal Church	July 19, 1989 (#89000828)	4th St. and Kansas Ave., SE. 44°21′42″N 98°12′46″W	Huron	
9	Habicht & Habicht Department Store	Habicht & Habicht Department Store	June 30, 2020 (#100005318)	274 Dakota Ave. South; 44°21′49″N 98°12′51″W	Huron	
10	Jefferson School	Jefferson School	November 15, 2019 (#100004620)	855 Utah Ave. SE; 44°21′24″N 98°12′27″W	Huron	Now Huron Church of the Open Bible
11	Margaret and Vernon Moxon House	Margaret and Vernon Moxon House	February 10, 1999 (#98001409)	1305 McDonald St. 44°21′04″N 98°13′26″W	Huron	Misspelled "Maxon" in the listing.
12	McMonies Barn	McMonies Barn	July 28, 2004 (#04000762)	604 33rd Street, S.E. 44°19′31″N 98°12′13″W	Huron	Feeder barn
13	Milford Hutterite Colony		June 30, 1982 (#82003909)	Northeast of Lake Byron; 44°36′48″N 98°03′17″W	Carpenter	
14	Old Riverside Hutterite Colony	Old Riverside Hutterite Colony	June 30, 1982 (#82003910)	Off the James River; 44°29′10″N 98°08′22″W	Huron	Also known as the Huron Hutterite Colony
15	Albert S. Piper Homestead Claim Shanty		August 28, 1998 (#98001126)	2 miles north of Lake Byron; 44°36′01″N 98°08′35″W	Carpenter	Shack built in 1882.
16	Pyle House	Pyle House	December 30, 1974 (#74002288)	376 Idaho Avenue, S.E. 44°21′44″N 98°12′32″W	Huron	
17	Site 39BE2	Site 39BE2	June 8, 2005 (#05000589)	Address restricted	Wessington Springs	
18	Site 39BE14	Site 39BE14	January 30, 1984 (#84003199)	Address restricted	Huron	
19	Site 39BE15	Site 39BE15	January 30, 1984 (#84003201)	Address restricted	Huron	
20	Site 39BE23	Site 39BE23	January 30, 1984 (#84003206)	Address restricted	Huron	
21	Site 39BE46	Site 39BE46	January 30, 1984 (#84003208)	Address restricted	Huron	
22	Site 39BE48	Site 39BE48	January 30, 1984 (#84003210)	Address restricted	Huron	
23	Site 39BE57	Site 39BE57	January 30, 1984 (#84003212)	Address restricted	Yale	
24	Site 39BE64	Site 39BE64	January 30, 1984 (#84003215)	Address restricted	Yale	
25	South Dakota Dept. of Transportation Bridge No. 03-020-008		December 9, 1993 (#93001260)	Local road over unnamed creek 44°37′15″N 98°39′56″W	Wessington	
26	South Dakota Dept. of Transportation Bridge No. 03-327-230	South Dakota Dept. of Transportation Bridge No. 03-327-230	December 9, 1993 (#93001261)	Local road over Pearl Creek; 44°17′49″N 98°02′24″W	Cavour	Scrapped in 2016.
27	South Dakota Dept. of Transportation Bridge No. 03-338-100		December 9, 1993 (#93001269)	Local road over Shue Creek; 44°29′13″N 98°01′00″W	Cavour	

== See also ==
- List of National Historic Landmarks in South Dakota
- National Register of Historic Places listings in South Dakota
