= John L. Pyle =

American attorney and politician

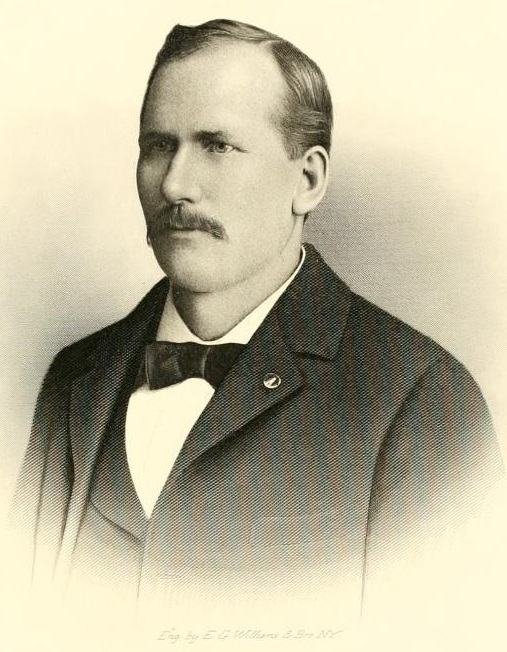
- From Volume II of 1904's History of South Dakota by Doane Robinson

Attorney General of South Dakota
- In office January 3, 1899 – February 22, 1902
- Governor: Andrew E. Lee; Charles N. Herreid
- Preceded by: Melvin Grigsby
- Succeeded by: Adolphus W. Burtt

Personal details
- Born: May 5, 1860 Coal Run, Ohio, U.S.
- Died: February 22, 1902 (aged 41) Huron, South Dakota, U.S.
- Resting place: Riverside Cemetery, Huron, South Dakota
- Party: Republican
- Spouse: Mamie Shields Pyle (m. 1886-1902, his death)
- Children: 4 (including Gladys Pyle)
- Profession: Attorney

John L. Pyle (May 5, 1860 - February 22, 1902) was an attorney and politician from the state of South Dakota. A Republican, he was notable for his service as state's attorney of Hand County (1886-1888) and state attorney general (1899-1902).

== Early life ==
John Levis Pyle was born in Coal Run, Ohio on May 5, 1860, the son of Mary (Dean) Pyle and Dr. Levis Pyle, a Union Army veteran of the American Civil War. Pyle was raised in Coal Run until shortly after the war, when his family moved to Raritan, Illinois. In 1882, the Levis Pyle family moved again, this time settling in Miller, Dakota Territory where he maintained a medical practice until shortly before his death in 1896.

John Pyle was educated in Coal Run and Raritan. He attended Westfield College in Westfield, Illinois for a year before traveling to Montana in 1879. He resided in Glendale and Wickes, where he was employed as a laborer, furnaceman and foreman in the smelting works associated with the local silver mines. When the smelter in Wickes was destroyed by fire, Pyle worked as a carpenter on the crew that rebuilt it, then decided to return to South Dakota to pursue studies in preparation for a career as an attorney.

== Legal career ==
Pyle moved from Montana to a farm near Miller in 1882, and operated his farm and worked as a carpenter while studying law with attorney Manford E. Williams of Miller. He attained admission to the bar in 1885, and practiced law in partnership with Williams. A Republican, from 1886 to 1888, Pyle served as State's Attorney of Hand County. In May 1888, he was elected to a term as a member of Miller's board of aldermen.

In 1889, Pyle moved to Huron, South Dakota and became head of the legal department for the Dakota Farm Mortgage Company. He continued to practice law in Huron until becoming state attorney general, and his caseload extended throughout the state and into North Dakota and Montana. In 1895, Pyle was admitted to practice before the United States Supreme Court.

After moving to Huron, Pyle was instrumental in the relocation of Pierre University to Huron, where it was renamed as Huron College. He was a major benefactor, served on the board of trustees, and all four of his children attended the school. After he died, his seat on the board was filled by his wife.

== State attorney general ==
In 1898, Pyle was a candidate for Attorney General of South Dakota. At that year's state Republican convention, which took place in August, Pyle defeated George Rice of Flandreau and James W. Fowler of Deadwood for the Republican nomination. In the November general election, Pyle defeated Cornelius S. Palmer, the Fusion candidate of the Democratic Party, People's Party, and Silver Republican Party by a vote of 38,701 to 34,147. He was reelected in 1900, defeating Abner E. Hitcocock, the Fusion nominee of the Democrats and People's Party by a vote of 53,900 to 40,059.

Pyle served from January 1899 until his death. He was the first South Dakota statewide official elected from Beadle County, and the first holder of a statewide elective position in South Dakota to die in office.

== Death and burial ==
In January 1902, Pyle became ill shortly after returning from a trip to Montana, and was diagnosed with typhoid fever. His condition continued to worsen, and he died at his home in Huron on February 22, 1902. Pyle was buried at Riverside Cemetery in Huron.

== Family ==
In 1886, Pyle married Mary Isabella "Mamie" Shields (1866-1949) of Miller. They were the parents of four children -- John Shields (1887-1948), May (1888-1974), Nellie (1889-1961), and Gladys (1890-1989).

Mamie Shields Pyle was a prominent activist in the cause of women's suffrage. Gladys Pyle served in the South Dakota House of Representatives, as South Dakota's Secretary of State, and briefly as one of the state's U.S. Senators.

== Sources ==
=== Books ===
- Hoover, Herbert T.; Zimmerman, Larry J. (1989). South Dakota Leaders: From Pierre Chouteau, Jr. to Oscar Howe. Vermillion, SD: University of South Dakota Press. ISBN 978-0-929925-00-4.
- Robinson, Doane (1904). History of South Dakota. Vol. II. Indianapolis, IN: B. F. Bowen & Co.

=== Newspapers ===
- "Miller Election". The Daily Huronite. Huron, SD. May 9, 1888 – via Newspapers.com.
- Tomlinson & Day (August 16, 1898). "Biographical Sketch, John L. Pyle". Argus Leader. Sioux Falls, SD – via Newspapers.com.
- "A State Convention: Republicans Nominate Their Men at Mitchell". The Mitchell Capital. Mitchell, SD. September 2, 1898 – via Newspapers.com.
- Tomlinson & Day (December 10, 1898). "Figures Unchanged: 370 Majority for Governor Lee on the Face of the Official Returns". Argus Leader. Sioux Falls, SD – via Newspapers.com.
- "Election Results: Official Canvass Shows Vote was Larger than Expected". Dakota Farmers' Leader. Canton, SD. December 14, 1900 – via Newspapers.com.
- "John M. Pyle's Sickness (sic)". The Mitchell Capital. Mitchell, SD. February 7, 1902 – via Newspapers.com.
- Tomlinson & Day (February 22, 1902). "John L. Pyle Died Today". Argus Leader. Sioux Falls, SD – via Newspapers.com.
- Tomlinson & Day (February 26, 1902). "Att'y Gen. Pyle's Funeral". Argus Leader. Sioux Falls, SD – via Newspapers.com.
- Hartwich, Ethelyn Miller (June 24, 1930). "Harlan Page Carson Envisioned Huron College In Early Eighties". The Daily Huronite. Huron, SD – via Newspapers.com.
- "Mrs. John L. Pyle, Huron, Dies". Argus Leader. Sioux Falls, SD. Associated Press. December 23, 1949 – via Newspapers.com.
- Bolding, Julie (March 16, 1989). "Pioneer Lawmaker Gladys Pyle Dies". Argus Leader. Sioux Falls, SD – via Newspapers.com.

Party political offices
Preceded by S.V. Jones	Republican nominee for Attorney General of South Dakota; 1898, 1900	Succeeded by Philo Hall
Political offices
Preceded by Melvin Grigsby	Attorney General of South Dakota; 1899–1902	Succeeded by Adolphus W. Burtt
