= Huron High School (South Dakota) =

Location
- 701 18th Street SW; Huron, South Dakota 57350; United States
- Coordinates: 44.3462°N 98.2269°W

Information
- Type: Public
- School district: Huron School District
- Principal: Rodney Mittelstedt
- Staff: 41.93 (FTE)
- Grades: 9–12
- Enrollment: 853 (2023–2024)
- Student to teacher ratio: 20.34
- Colors: Orange and Black
- Athletics conference: Eastern South Dakota Conference
- Mascot: Tigers
- Website: Official website

Huron High School is a high school located in Huron, South Dakota. It is a part of the Huron School District.

The high school's boundary includes Huron, Morningside, and Riverside Colony.

== Athletics ==
Huron competes in the Eastern South Dakota Conference, and their teams are known as the Tigers.

State Championships
Sport	Year (s)
Basketball (Boys)	1917, 1927, 1930, 1936, 1937, 1945, 1958, 1973, 1981, 1993, 2004, 2026
Cross Country (Girls)	1978, 1981, 1987, 1989
Golf (Boys)	1939, 1942, 1963, 1974
Track & Field (Boys)	1910, 1911, 1952
Track & Field (Girls)	1983
Volleyball	1998, 1999
Tennis (Girls)	1986
Basketball (Girls)	1989
Football	1992
Wrestling	1994

== Notable pupils ==
- Harold Van Heuvelen, musician
- Lynn Schneider, member of the South Dakota House of Representatives
- Jennifer Hart, murderer
- Mike Busch, NFL quarterback
