= Attorney General Burt =

Attorney General Burt may refer to:

- Septimus Burt (1847–1919), Attorney General of Western Australia
- Sydney Burt (1826–1892), Attorney General of Fiji

== See also ==
- Adolphus W. Burtt (1832–1917), Attorney General of South Dakota
