= Adolphus W. Burtt =

American attorney and politician

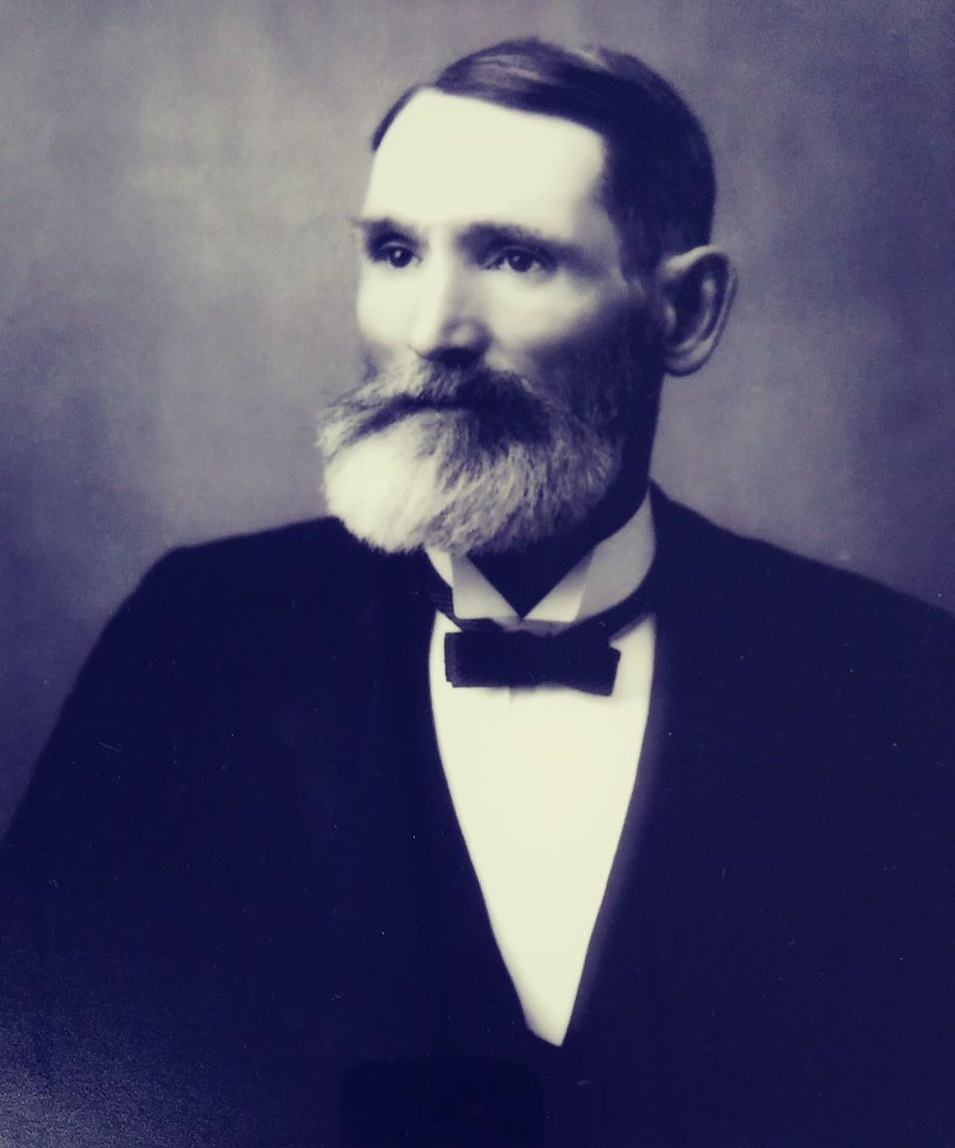

Attorney General of South Dakota
- In office March 18, 1902 – January 5, 1903
- Governor: Charles N. Herreid
- Preceded by: John L. Pyle
- Succeeded by: Philo Hall

Member of the South Dakota Senate from the 22nd District
- In office 1893–1895
- Preceded by: A. B. Melville
- Succeeded by: Edward H. Alpin

Personal details
- Born: May 28, 1832 New York, U.S.
- Died: January 7, 1917 (aged 84) Kalispell, Montana, U.S.
- Resting place: Conrad Memorial Cemetery, Kalispell, Montana
- Party: Republican
- Spouse: Emily Elizabeth Beebe (m. 1857; died 1910)
- Children: 1
- Profession: Attorney

Adolphus W. Burtt (May 28, 1832 – January 7, 1917) was an American attorney and politician. He is most notable for his service in the South Dakota Senate in the early 1890s and as Attorney General of South Dakota in the early 1900s.

== Early life ==
Adolphus William Burtt (sometimes spelled "Burt") was born in New York (Note: Sources differ on the exact location of Burtt's birth. Some indicate Genesee County, while others indicate Watertown.) on May 28, 1832, the son of Warren D. Burtt and Sarah (Fowler) Burtt. (Note: According to the 1855 state census, Burtt was the oldest of four children, and his siblings were Amelia, Homer, and Warren.) He was educated raised and educated in Watertown and Mendon. Burtt attended Genesee Wesleyan Seminary, then worked as a bookkeeper. At the time of the 1860 census, he was living with his wife's family in West Bloomfield, New York.

== Start of career ==
Burtt moved to Pontiac, Michigan, in the mid-1860s. He studied law, probably under Michael E. Crofoot, whose partner he later became, and was admitted to the bar in 1869. He was active in politics as a Republican, and ran unsuccessfully for prosecuting attorney of Oakland County and city clerk of Pontiac. Burtt served as a justice of the peace of Pontiac's municipal court, and afterwards was usually referred to as "Judge Burtt". After several years of practice as Crofoot & Burtt, in 1877 Crofoot's son Louis joined the firm, which became known as Crofoot, Burtt & Crofoot.

== Move to South Dakota ==
In 1881, Burtt and Louis W. Crofoot were among a large contingent of Pontiac residents who decided to file claims for land grants in the Dakota Territory and move to what is now Beadle County, South Dakota. Burtt and Louis Crofoot practiced in partnership in Huron, and Burtt served several terms as Huron's city attorney, in addition to running unsuccessfully for mayor.

Burtt won election to the South Dakota Senate in 1892, and served one term, 1893 to 1895. When Attorney General John L. Pyle died in 1902, Governor Charles N. Herreid appointed Burtt to fill the vacancy, and he served from March 1902 until January 1903. He was not a candidate for a full term in 1902, and was succeeded by Philo Hall.

From 1906 to 1907, Burtt served as president of the South Dakota Bar Association. He was also the longtime president of the Beadle County Bar Association. Burtt was an active member of the Masons and the Elks, and had a reputation as an effective orator, which caused him to be sought out for speeches at political meetings, holiday commemorations, and other events.

== Retirement and death ==
In 1909, Burtt and his wife moved to Kalispell, Montana, so they could reside near their daughter and son-in-law. He died in Kalispell on January 7, 1917, and was buried at Conrad Memorial Cemetery in Kalispell.

== Family ==
In 1857, Burtt married Emily Elizabeth Beebe (1836–1910) of West Bloomfield, New York. They were the parents of a daughter, Nellie (1864–1938). Nellie Burtt was the wife of George A. Fessenden (1863–1910).

== Sources ==
=== Newspapers ===
- "Justice Court: Before Justice Burtt". Pontiac Weekly Gazette. Pontiac, MI. May 5, 1871 – via Central Michigan University: Digital Michigan Newspapers.
- "Jottings: M. E. Comisky Acted the Highly Honorable Part". Pontiac Weekly Gazette. Pontiac, MI. April 14, 1876 – via Central Michigan University: Digital Michigan Newspapers.
- "Republican County Ticket". Pontiac Commercial. Pontiac, MI. September 5, 1876 – via Central Michigan University: Digital Michigan Newspapers.
- "That Mill Pond". Pontiac Weekly Gazette. Pontiac, MI. February 15, 1878 – via Central Michigan University: Digital Michigan Newspapers. "A. W. Burtt Sworn. Have lived here 14 years..."
- "A "Legal" Fight". Pontiac Weekly Bill Poster. Pontiac, MI. March 12, 1879 – via Central Michigan University: Digital Michigan Newspapers. "A. W. Burtt Sworn. Have lived here 14 years..."
- Burtt, A. W. (February 3, 1887). "Meeting Resolutions, Beadle County Bar Association". Dakota Huronite. Huron, SD – via NewspaperArchive.com.
- "Burtt Succeeds Sterling: Judge A. W. Burtt of Huron Gets the Attorneyship of the Northwestern". Argus Leader. Sioux Falls, SD. July 25, 1895 – via Newspapers.com.
- "Burtt is Named: Judge A. W. Burtt of Huron Appointed Attorney General". Argus Leader. Sioux Falls, SD. March 18, 1902 – via Newspapers.com.
- "State Bar Meeting: A. W. Burtt, of Huron, Elected President of the Association". Dakota Farmers' Leader. Canton, SD. January 12, 1906 – via Newspapers.com.
- "Golden Wedding: Judge Burtt and Wife of Huron Celebrate in Montana". Argus Leader. Sioux Falls, SD. July 15, 1907 – via Newspapers.com.
- "Aged Resident of Kalispell Dead". Great Falls Tribune. Great Falls, MT. January 10, 1917 – via Newspapers.com.
- "Mrs. G. A. Fessenden Dies in San Diego". The Daily Plainsman. Huron, SD. October 13, 1938 – via Newspapers.com.
- "G. A. Fessenden Passes on Coast". The Missoulian. Missoula, MT. November 11, 1938 – via Newspapers.com.

=== Internet ===
- "1850 United States Federal Census, Entry for Warren Burt and Sarah (Fowler) Burt". Ancestry.com. Lehi, UT: Ancestry.com LLC. 1855.
- "1860 United States Federal Census, Entry for Family of Enoch M. Beebe and Sarah Beebe". Ancestry.com. Lehi, UT: Ancestry.com LLC. 1860.
- "1870 United States Federal Census, Entry for Family of Adolphus W. Burtt and Emily Burtt". Ancestry.com. Lehi, UT: Ancestry.com LLC. 1870.
- "1910 United States Federal Census, Entry for Family of George A. Fessenden and Nellie Fessenden". Ancestry.com. Lehi, UT: Ancestry.com LLC. 1860.
- Rowley, Vickie (May 3, 1910). "1910 Deaths" (PDF). Flathead County, Montana History. Dayton, MT: MTGenWeb.

== Books ==
- "4" (PDF). South Dakota Legislative Manual: Executive Branch. Pierre, SD: South Dakota Secretary of State. 2007. Archived from the original (PDF) on January 31, 2017.
- Tefft, B. D. (1851). Catalogue of the Officers and Students of the Genesee Wesleyan Seminary (PDF). Lima, NY: Genesee Wesleyan Seminary.
- Durant, Samuel W. (1877). History of Oakland County. Philadelphia, PA: L. H. Everts & Co.

Legal offices
Preceded by John L. Pyle	Attorney General of South Dakota; 1902–1903	Succeeded by Philo Hall
