= Attorney General Grigsby =

Attorney General Grigsby may refer to:

- George Barnes Grigsby (1874–1962), Attorney General of Alaska
- Melvin Grigsby (1845–1917), Attorney General of South Dakota
