= Broadland (disambiguation) =

Broadland is a local government district in Norfolk, England.

Broadland or Broadlands may also refer to:

- Broadland (UK Parliament constituency), a parliamentary constituency in Norfolk, England
- Broadland, South Dakota, a town in Beadle County, South Dakota, United States
- The Broads, Norfolk and Suffolk, England
- Broadlands, an English country house in Hampshire
- Broadlands, Devon, an area in Newton Abbott, Devon, England
- Broadlands, Illinois, a village in Champaign County, Illinois, United States
- Broadlands, a townland in Ireland, see List of townlands of County Mayo
- Broadlands, New Zealand, in Rotorua Lakes District
- Broadlands, Victoria, in the Shire of East Gippsland, Australia
- Broadlands, Virginia, a census-designated place in Loudoun County, Virginia, United States
