= Attorney General Hall =

Attorney General Hall may refer to:

- David Hall (Australian politician) (1874–1945), Attorney General of New South Wales
- Ephraim B. Hall (1822–1898), Attorney General of West Virginia
- Philo Hall (1865–1938), Attorney General of South Dakota
- Willis Hall (New York politician) (1801–1868), Attorney General of New York
