= Pearl Creek Colony, South Dakota =

- Census-designated place
- Location within South Dakota Location within the United States
- Coordinates: 44°19′34″N 97°55′06″W
- Country: United States
- State: South Dakota
- County: Beadle

Area
  - Total: 0.35 sq mi (0.91 km^{2})
  - Land: 0.35 sq mi (0.91 km^{2})
  - Water: 0 sq mi (0.00 km^{2})
- Elevation: 1,358 ft (414 m)

Population (2020)
  - Total: 99
  - Density: 280.4/sq mi (108.27/km^{2})
- Time zone: UTC-6 (Central (CST))
  - Summer (DST): UTC-5 (CDT)
- ZIP Code: 57353 (Iroquois)
- Area code: 605
- FIPS code: 46-48820
- GNIS feature ID: 2812995

Pearl Creek Colony is a Hutterite colony and census-designated place (CDP) in Beadle County, South Dakota, United States. It was first listed as a CDP prior to the 2020 census. The population of the CDP was 99 at the 2020 census.

It is on the northwest side of Middle Pearl Creek, a southwest-flowing tributary of the James River. It is 5 miles (8 km) southwest of Iroquois and 18 miles (29 km) east-southeast of Huron.

== Demographics ==
Historical population
Census	Pop.	Note	%±
2020	99		—
U.S. Decennial Census
