= Albert S. Piper Homestead Claim Shanty =

- U.S. National Register of Historic Places
- Location within South Dakota Location within the United States
- Nearest city: Carpenter, South Dakota
- Coordinates: 44°36′01″N 98°08′35″W
- Area: less than one acre
- Built: 1882
- Built by: Albert S. Piper
- Architectural style: Woodframe shack
- NRHP reference No.: 98001126
- Added to NRHP: August 28, 1998

The Albert S. Piper Homestead Claim Shanty is a structure located near the unincorporated community of Carpenter, in Beadle County, South Dakota. Built in 1882, it was listed on the National Register of Historic Places in 1998.

It is a woodframe 16 by 10 feet (4.9 m × 3.0 m) claim shanty built with horizontal wood plank walls.

It is located about 2 miles (3.2 km) north of Lake Byron.
