= Harold Van Heuvelen =

American classical composer

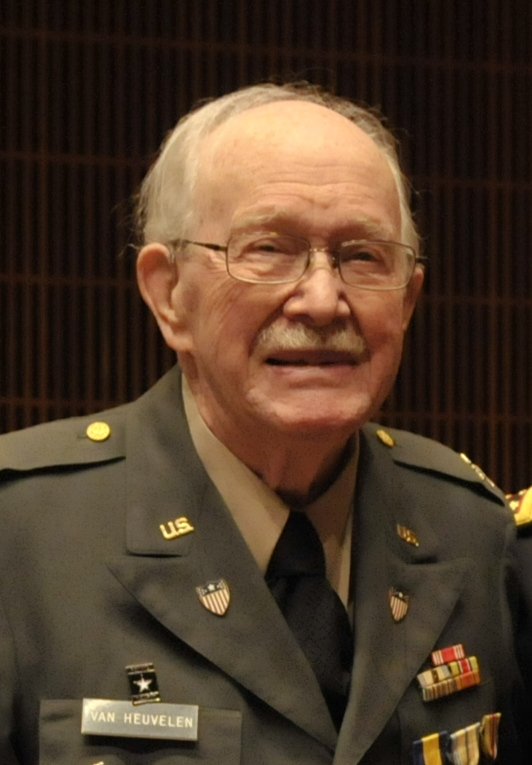
Harold Van Heuvelen at the premiere of his Symphony No. 1, 2012

Harold John Van Heuvelen (March 30, 1919 – April 26, 2017) was an American composer and musician known principally for his Symphony No. 1 (opus 7), which was composed during World War II and which premiered 67 years later in 2012.

== Personal life ==
Van Heuvelen was raised in Huron, South Dakota, the son of Carrie Catherine and Berend Van Heuvelen. Harold Van Heuvelen graduated from Huron High School. He spent a year at Huron College, before enrolling at Hope College in Holland, Michigan, graduating in 1940 with a degree in music. He also received a master's degree in violin performance from the University of Michigan.

After the 1941 attack on Pearl Harbor, Van Heuvelen enlisted in the United States Army and served as a recruiter during World War II, eventually rising to the rank of colonel. He spent a further 33 years as an Army reservist.

Around 1943, he married Fran Van Heuvelen and later became a music teacher in the Bismarck, North Dakota public schools from 1946 to 1948. In 2007, after the deaths of their respective spouses, Harold married Alma Van Heuvelen (née Viswat), whom he had met while they were both students at Hope College decades before.

== Music ==
As a teenager, Van Heuvelen was trained as a violinist on an Andrea Guarneri instrument from 1694. The instrument, which he owned for much of his life, had variously been valued at US$50000 and US$250000.

His Symphony No. 1 evokes American sentiments during World War II in its four movements. The first movement is inspired by the worldwide events that led to the war—a period of "wandering and searching". The second movement represents the military buildup in the United States prior to its declaration of war. The third movement recalls the conflict itself and the eventual "glorious victory", while the fourth movement signifies the "glorious peace" thereafter, which Van Heuvelen imagined as "a nice wonderful time" in which America believed "war was over for always".

Composition of the symphony began in April 1945, during a period of relative calm following the Allied victory in Europe. While soldiers at Van Heuvelen's New Orleans post waited to hear if they would be sent to Japan, they were instructed merely to "find something to keep [themselves] busy" while on duty. While many of Van Heuvelen's compatriots sketched house plans, the composer committed his symphony to a handwritten, bound volume. Soon after the war, Van Heuvelen showed the finished symphony to Leonard Bernstein, but nothing came of it. For decades, the symphony languished—it was too difficult for Van Heuvelen's high school orchestra to play—until Harold's son Bob Van Heuvelen had it transcribed into electronic form and recorded on a compact disc.

Bob Van Heuvelen served as chief of staff to United States Senator Kent Conrad, and mentioned the symphony to him; Conrad in turn contacted Senator Carl Levin, who as Chairman of the Armed Services Committee and a connoisseur of classical music, requested a copy of the recording. Levin arranged for it to be premiered at Brucker Hall at Fort Myer, Virginia on November 4, 2012, by the United States Army Band under the direction of Major Tod Addison. Although Addison had initially worried that the symphony would not be particularly good, he abandoned those reservations upon seeing the score, later describing the piece as "tonal", "accessible", "broad" and "neo-romantic" in the manner of Brahms. With Harold Van Heuvelen in attendance—in his newly tailored, World-War-II-era uniform—the symphony was premiered to a standing ovation.

Other compositions by Harold Van Heuvelen include a violin concerto.
