= Bethel Church (Yale, South Dakota) =

Coordinates: 44°33′59″N 98°03′34″W

- Bethel Mennonite Brethren Church
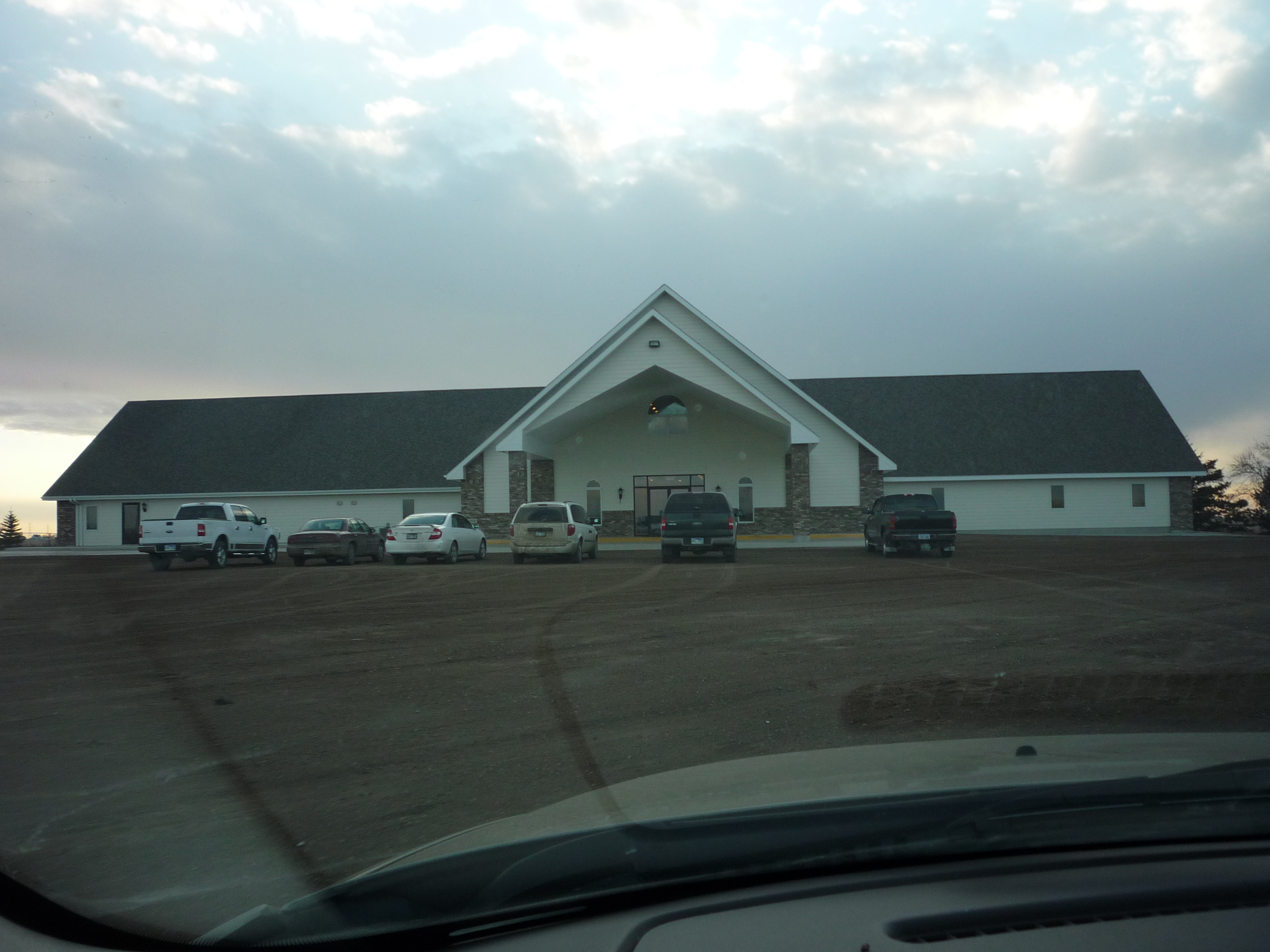
- Bethel Church in 2009
- Bethel Church
- Location: 19453 408 Avenue; Yale, South Dakota
- Country: United States
- Denomination: U.S. Conference of Mennonite Brethren Churches
- Website: http://www.bethelmbchurch.org/

History
- Founded: 1904
- Dedication: 2006
- Events: Host of 2009,1991,1981 Central District Conference Meetings; Centennial in 2004

Architecture
- Architect: Picek Construction Co Inc
- Groundbreaking: 2005
- Completed: 2006
- Construction cost: $1,001,064

Specifications
- Length: 186
- Width: 110

Bethel Church is a Mennonite Brethren Church in rural Yale, South Dakota, a member of the Central District of the Mennonite Brethren Church. Their mission statement is "Working together for growing God's family, a place where integrity is honored, training is valued, compassion is expected, and outreach is emphasized."

== History ==
Bethel church was founded in 1904. In 1920, they built a new building and incorporating the original church building In 1953, Bethel donated a building to James Valley Christian School to start out on. Bethel is one church near Lake Byron. In 2005 the congregation built the present building at a cost of $1,000,000 and paid off the building note a few years later.

== Pastors ==
- 1902-1910: John Z. Kleinsasser
- 1908-1948: John Tschetter
- 1912-1941: Jacob M. Tschetter
- 1919-1929: Rev. Jacob P. Glanzer
- 1911-1915: Rev. Samuel J. R. Hofer
- 1935-1944: Rev. Samuel J. R. Hofer
- 1944-1947: Rev. A. K. Wiens
- 1947: Rev. Eli L. Hofer
- 1947-1952: Rev. John H. Kleinsasser
- 1952-1953: Rev. Paul Bartel
- 1953-1960: Rev. George Classen
- 1962-1965: Rev. Laverne Hofer
- 1965-1966: Rev. Menno Pullman
- 1966-1969: Rev. John B. Guenter
- 1969-1977: Rev. Ron Seibel
- 1978-1995: Rev. Elton Berg
- 1995-1999: Gary Janzen
- 2000-2004: Rev. Tom Cartney
- 2004-2005: Vacant, weekly speaker
- 2005-2007: Rev. Ernie Lambright
- 2007-2008: Interim Pastor: Ray Shepard
- 2008–2012: Jeremiah Betron
- 2012–Present: Coalt Robinson
