= Charles H. Burke =

American politician (1861–1944)

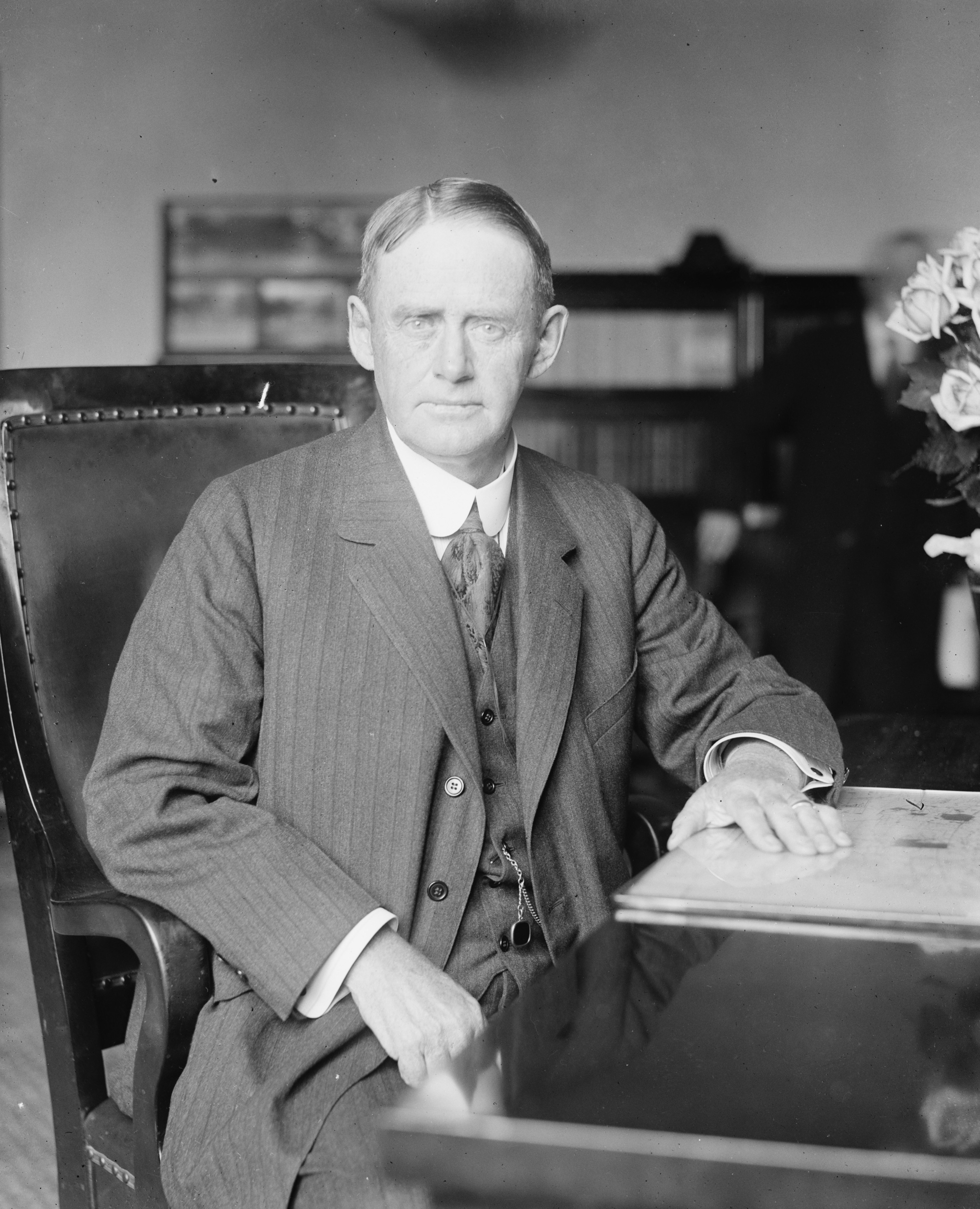
- Burke in 1921

31st Commissioner of Indian Affairs
- In office April 1, 1921 – June 30, 1929
- President: Warren G. Harding; Calvin Coolidge
- Preceded by: Cato Sells
- Succeeded by: Charles J. Rhoads

House Minority Whip
- In office March 4, 1913 – March 3, 1915
- Leader: James Mann
- Preceded by: John W. Dwight
- Succeeded by: Charles M. Hamilton

Member of the U.S. House of Representatives from South Dakota's 2nd district
- In office March 4, 1913 – March 3, 1915
- Preceded by: Eben Martin
- Succeeded by: Royal C. Johnson

Member of the U.S. House of Representatives from South Dakota's at-large district
- In office March 4, 1909 – March 3, 1913
- Preceded by: Philo Hall
- Succeeded by: Charles H. Dillon
- In office March 4, 1899 – March 3, 1907
- Preceded by: John Edward Kelley
- Succeeded by: Philo Hall

Personal details
- Born: Charles Henry Burke; April 1, 1861 Batavia, New York, U.S.
- Died: April 7, 1944 (aged 83) Washington, D.C., U.S.
- Party: Republican

Charles Henry Burke (April 1, 1861 – April 7, 1944) was a Republican congressman from South Dakota and commissioner of the Bureau of Indian Affairs in the 1920s.

== Biography ==
He was born near Batavia, New York, in 1861, and attended the public school there. He moved to the Dakota Territory in 1882 and settled on a homestead in Beadle County of what is now South Dakota, moving on to Hughes County in 1883.

He studied law and was admitted to the bar in 1886. He also engaged in the real estate investment business in the area of Pierre, South Dakota. He was elected to the South Dakota House of Representatives in 1895 and 1897. He ran for the United States House of Representatives in 1898, won election, and remained in that position through 1907, losing the nomination for the 1906 election, although he won again in 1908 and remained in the House through 1915, serving as Minority whip from 1913 through 1915. In 1906 he was heavily involved in passing the Burke Act. In 1914, he received the nomination for the United States Senate seat from South Dakota and chose not to run for reelection to the House. He lost that Senate race.

He was appointed Commissioner of Indian Affairs in 1921 and served in that capacity until his resignation in 1929. He died in 1944, in Washington, D. C.

=== Burke and Native Americans ===
Upon taking on his appointment in 1921, Burke cancelled over 20,000 land patents from 1917-1921. These were forced fee land patents that many of the owners did not agree to. Among the supporters was Senator Charles Curtis, who was a Native American.

During the early 1920s, Secretary of the Interior Albert B. Fall and his ally Charles H. Burke were prominent figures representing the obscurantist faction, prioritizing business interests over Native American rights. Fall, known for his corruption, and Burke, who authored legislation detrimental to Native American citizenship, faced resistance from reformers. Despite their efforts to suppress Native American culture and religion, the reform movement gained traction, eventually leading to legislative victories such as the Indian Reorganization Act. The struggle between reformers and exploiters was shaped by public opinion, influenced by mass media outlets and church publications, with obscurantists resorting to derogatory portrayals of Native American traditions to justify their positions.

In 1934, Congress passed the Wheeler-Howard Bill, also known as the Indian Reorganization Act, a significant victory for advocates like John Collier and Gertrude Bonnin, who had long battled against exploiters like Albert B. Fall and Charles H. Burke. This legislation marked the culmination of a fierce struggle that began in the 1920s, where reformers fought against an unsympathetic Congress and a negligent bureaucracy. Despite facing opposition from figures like Fall and Burke, who prioritized business interests over Native American welfare, the reformers managed to secure some improvements during the 1920s. The momentum of the New Deal era eventually propelled the passage of the Indian Reorganization Act, granting tribes more autonomy and resources.

== Legacy ==
The town of Burke, South Dakota, was named for the congressman.

Party political offices
First	Republican nominee for U.S. Senator from South Dakota (Class 3); 1914	Succeeded by Peter Norbeck
U.S. House of Representatives
Preceded by John Edward Kelley	Member of the U.S. House of Representatives from South Dakota's at-large congressional district 1899–1907	Succeeded by Philo Hall
Preceded by Philo Hall	Member of the U.S. House of Representatives from South Dakota's at-large congressional district 1909–1913	Succeeded by Charles H. Dillon
Preceded by Eben W. Martin	Member of the U.S. House of Representatives from South Dakota's 2nd congressional district 1913–1915	Succeeded by Royal C. Johnson
