= Shamrock Colony, South Dakota =

- Census-designated place
- Location within South Dakota Location within the United States
- Coordinates: 44°37′14″N 97°57′32″W
- Country: United States
- State: South Dakota
- County: Beadle

Area
  - Total: 0.66 sq mi (1.71 km^{2})
  - Land: 0.65 sq mi (1.68 km^{2})
  - Water: 0.012 sq mi (0.03 km^{2})
- Elevation: 1,408 ft (429 m)

Population (2020)
  - Total: 88
  - Density: 135.8/sq mi (52.42/km^{2})
- Time zone: UTC-6 (Central (CST))
  - Summer (DST): UTC-5 (CDT)
- ZIP Code: 57322 (Carpenter)
- Area code: 605
- FIPS code: 46-58310
- GNIS feature ID: 2812994

Shamrock Colony is a Hutterite colony and census-designated place (CDP) in Beadle County, South Dakota, United States. It was first listed as a CDP prior to the 2020 census. The population of the CDP was 88 at the 2020 census.

It is in the northeast corner of the county, 3 miles (5 km) southwest of Carpenter and 32 miles (51 km) northeast of Huron, the county seat.

== Demographics ==
Historical population
Census	Pop.	Note	%±
2020	88		—
U.S. Decennial Census
