= Mamie Shields Pyle =

American women's suffrage leader

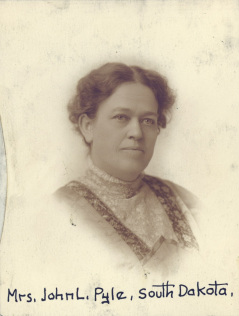
- Pyle, 1949
- Born: Mary Isabella Shields; February 28, 1866; Orange, New Jersey, U.S.
- Died: December 22, 1949 (aged 83); Huron, South Dakota, U.S.
- Resting place: Riverside Cemetery, Huron, South Dakota, U.S.
- Other names: Mary Shields Pyle; Mrs. John L. Pyle
- Occupations: Teacher; Activist
- Known for: Suffrage leader in South Dakota

Mary "Mamie" Shields Pyle (February 28, 1866 – December 22, 1949) was a women's suffrage leader in the U.S. state of South Dakota. She was instrumental in the state's enactment of women's suffrage in 1918.

Following a failed 1910 referendum on women's suffrage, Pyle became the leader of the South Dakota Universal Franchise League. She then led the organization through several attempts to pass state referendums, narrowing the margin of defeat over time until women's suffrage became part of the Citizenship Amendment and finally passed in 1918. Pyle remained president of the South Dakota Universal Franchise League through the state's ratification of the Nineteenth Amendment the following year. She later became president of the state's chapter of the League of Women Voters. Pyle was one of the first women to become a presidential elector in 1921.

Beyond suffrage, Pyle supported the proposed Equal Rights Amendment. She was believed in education and worked to establish Huron College in Huron, South Dakota, where she was a trustee for over forty years.

== Early life ==
Mary "Mamie" Isabella Shields was born on February 28, 1866, in Orange, New Jersey to parents Hugh P. and Jennie Shields (née Overend). H.P. Shields enlisted for the American Civil War as a musician in the 1st New Jersey Volunteer Infantry and served from 1861 until being discharged for disability in 1863. H.P. and Jennie Shields had three daughters, one of whom died at a young age. When Pyle was seven years old, her family moved to Pleasant Grove, Minnesota.

== Early career and marriage ==
In 1882, Pyle moved to Brookings City in the Dakota Territory and became a teacher in a rural school. After one year there, Pyle moved to Miller, Dakota Territory where her parents lived. She continued teaching in Beadle County, South Dakota, until marrying attorney and politician John L. Pyle in 1886. The couple moved from Miller to Huron, Dakota Territory two years later. Together they had four children: John Shields (1887–1948), May (1888–1974), Nellie (1889–1961), and Gladys (1890–1989). The family lived in a home that John L. Pyle built in 1893. He and Mamie worked to bring Pierre University to Huron, where it was renamed Huron College. Her husband was elected Attorney General of South Dakota in 1898. He died in 1902.

== Suffrage leader ==
Pyle was inspired to join the suffrage movement after noticing a local party boss bringing immigrant workers to vote on election day. At the time, South Dakota allowed non-citizen men to vote but not women. Pyle rose to prominence in the suffrage movement after the defeat of the South Dakota women's suffrage amendment in a referendum in November 1910. Unlike other suffrage leaders in the state, Pyle had not been active in the temperance movement, and stressed that suffrage and temperance should remain separate issues. (Note: There was a significant overlap between the suffrage and "temperance" movements. Much of the opposition to women's suffrage came from brewers and distillers, who feared that if women got the vote, they would use it to enact prohibition. Opposition to the two was particularly strong among German Americans.) Seeing the need for a new direction, Pyle called a state suffrage convention in 1911 and rebranded the Suffrage Association as the South Dakota Universal Franchise League. Under Pyle's leadership, the Franchise League kept its independence from national organizations even though Pyle shared many similarities and a friendship with National American Woman Suffrage Association president Carrie Chapman Catt.

A 1914 referendum on women's suffrage lost by approximately 12,000 votes, an improvement from the referendum in 1910 that had lost by 22,000 votes. The League elected her to a third term in November 1915. With the progress made, Pyle and the League lobbied the legislature to pass another women's suffrage amendment, which would once again be put to a public vote. The measure easily passed the legislature, with support from the state Republican and Democratic parties. For the public vote, scheduled for November 1916, Pyle changed strategies from using district organizers to mobilizing county leaders to contact every voter in the state. Pyle and the suffragists still lost the 1916 vote, cutting the margin of their loss to 5,000 votes.

In January 1917, Pyle and other suffragettes polled the South Dakota legislature to determine the support for a suffrage amendment. The proponents gauged sufficient support and introduced the measure in both houses of the state legislature. The legislature passed a woman's suffrage bill for the seventh and final time in 1917. By March 1918, the United States had entered World War I and Governor Peter Norbeck was concerned with how non-citizens would vote given 22% of the state population had German heritage. Norbeck called a special session of the legislature and asked Pyle to be present to consult on an amendment to the woman's suffrage clause to exclude non-citizens from voting. The amendment became known as the Citizenship Amendment. Pyle and the Universal Franchise League gave their full support to the amendment and continued to campaign aggressively. The National American Woman Suffrage Association sent additional campaigners to the state. Under Pyle's leadership, the suffragists gathered petitions in every county and then sent copies of those petitions and pamphlets to every voter in the state. The Citizenship Amendment enfranchising women passed on November 6, 1918, with 64% of the vote.

In November 1917, she was a delegate for South Dakota to the National Suffrage Convention in Washington, D.C. South Dakota passed the Nineteenth Amendment to the United States Constitution, giving franchise to women across the country, on December 4, 1919. Pyle remained president of the League until 1920. Pyle then became the president of the South Dakota League of Women Voters, a position she held until 1922.

== Later life and death ==
In 1919, the Republicans proposed Pyle as a presidential elector for the 1920 presidential election, for which she also served as an advisory member of the Republican executive committee. She was elected as an elector in November 1920—the first American woman to hold the position. She was also given the honor of bringing the electors' votes to Washington in January 1921. Pyle was a leader in efforts to pass the 1923 Equal Rights Amendment. Pyle was a trustee of Huron College from 1902 until 1949 and was president of the college's Women's Association. In 1938 her youngest daughter, Gladys, became the first woman elected to the United States Senate without first having been appointed. After Gladys was elected to the Senate, Pyle drove across the country with her daughter to Washington, D.C. (Note: Gladys was elected in a special election to fill a two month term. Congress adjourned before Gladys' term began, although she did work on behalf of her constituents during her time in Washington.) In 1947, Pyle was named state mother of South Dakota. In the later years of her life, Gladys was Pyle's caregiver in the family home in Huron.

Pyle died in her sleep on December 22, 1949, following an extended illness. The Pyle family home in Huron has been turned into a museum and is listed on the National Register of Historic Places.
