= S. Wesley Clark =

American attorney (1872–1949)

Samuel Wesley Clark
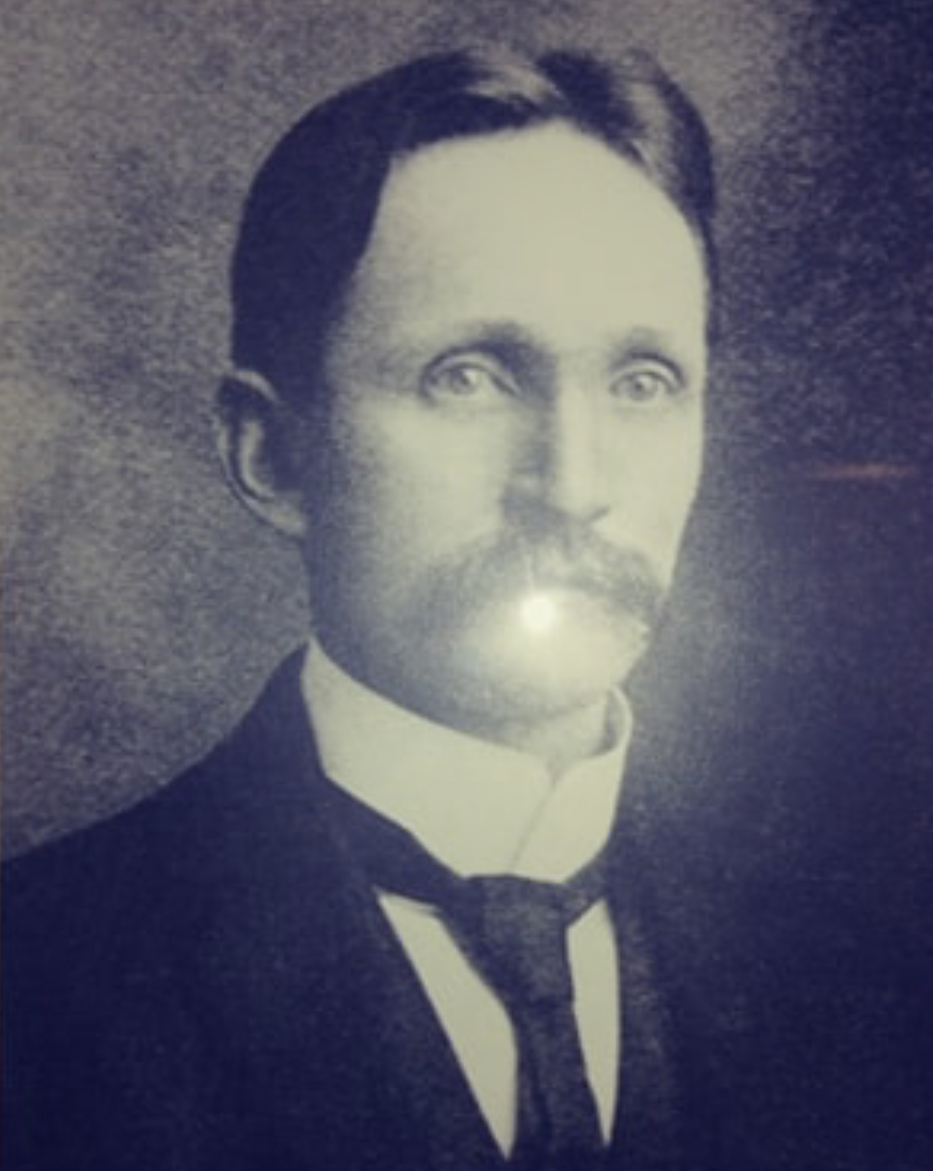

23rd United States Attorney for the District of South Dakota
- In office 1921–1926

7th Attorney General of South Dakota
- In office January 8, 1907 – January 1911
- Governor: Coe I. Crawford
- Preceded by: Philo Hall
- Succeeded by: Royal Johnson

Personal details
- Born: December 28, 1872 Plattesville, Wisconsin, U.S.
- Died: January 7, 1949 (aged 76)
- Party: Republican
- Spouse: Essie Eggler
- Profession: Attorney

Samuel Wesley Clark (December 28, 1872 – January 7, 1949) was an American attorney, Attorney General of South Dakota, and U.S. Attorney for the District of South Dakota.

== Early life and education ==
Clark was born Samuel Wesley Clark to Samuel Pliny and Elizabeth Dennison Clark on December 28, 1872, in Platteville, Wisconsin. In his formative youth, he read law books while tending to his family's cattle herd on the prairie. He attended Redfield College then read law under Thomas Sterling.

== Career ==
Clark was the state's attorney of Spink County, South Dakota, from 1900 to 1904. He served as Attorney General of South Dakota from 1907 to 1911 before being appointed United States Attorney for the District of South Dakota at the recommendation of Thomas Sterling and serving from 1921 to 1926.

== Personal life ==
In 1900, he married Daisy Labrie, who died in 1915. Later he married Essie Eggler in 1919. He was a Congregationalist.

Party political offices
Preceded by Philo Hall	Republican nominee for Attorney General of South Dakota; 1906, 1908	Succeeded by Royal C. Johnson
Legal offices
Preceded by Philo Hall	Attorney General of South Dakota; 1907–1911	Succeeded by Royal C. Johnson
