= Melvin Grigsby =

American attorney, politician, and military leader

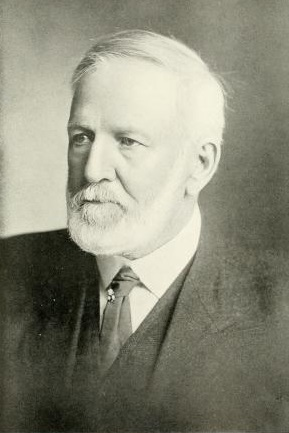
- From Volume 5 of 1915’s "History of Dakota Territory" by George W. Kingsbury

3rd Attorney General of South Dakota
- In office 1897–1899
- Governor: Andrew E. Lee
- Preceded by: Coe I. Crawford
- Succeeded by: John L. Pyle

Personal details
- Born: June 8, 1845 Potosi, Wisconsin, US
- Died: February 15, 1917 (aged 71) Birmingham, Alabama, US
- Resting place: Mount Pleasant Cemetery, Sioux Falls, South Dakota
- Party: Republican (1866-1894, 1900-1917); People’s Party (1894-1900)
- Spouse: Fannie Lou Kingsbury (m. 1873-1917, his death)
- Children: 4, including: Sioux K. Grigsby; George Barnes Grigsby; John T. Grigsby
- Education: Platteville Normal School
- Occupation: Attorney; Bank president

Military service
- Allegiance: United States Union
- Branch/service: Union Army (Civil War); United States Army (Spanish–American War)
- Years of service: 1861–1865 (Union Army); 1898-1899 (U.S. Army)
- Rank: Colonel
- Unit: 2nd Wisconsin Cavalry (Civil War)
- Commands: 3rd United States Volunteer Cavalry (Spanish–American War); 1st Cavalry Brigade, First Army Corps (Spanish–American War)
- Battles/wars: American Civil War; Spanish–American War

Melvin Grigsby (June 8, 1845 – February 15, 1917) was an American attorney, politician, and military leader from South Dakota. A Union Army veteran of the American Civil War, Grigsby was most notable for his service as South Dakota Attorney General and an organizer and commander of the 3rd United States Volunteer Cavalry Regiment during the Spanish–American War.

== Early life ==
Melvin Grigsby was born in the town of Potosi, Wisconsin on June 8, 1845 to William Etchison Grigsby and Rhoda (Thomas) Grigsby. At the time of Grigsby's birth, his father worked as a lead miner, but when Grigsby was four, his family relocated to a farm near Potosi village. Grigsby was raised to do farm work while he received his early education in the village's public schools. As a teenager, he attended Lancaster Institute, a private academy in Lancaster, Wisconsin.

== Civil War ==
In September 1861, Cadwallader C. Washburn visited Lancaster to recruit soldiers for the 2nd Wisconsin Cavalry. Grigsby obtained his father's consent and enlisted as a private in the regiment's Company C.

Grigsby took part in several of the 2nd Wisconsin's engagements in and around Vicksburg, Mississippi and attained the rank of sergeant. On March 8, 1864, he was captured near the Big Black River and held as a prisoner of war. Grigsby spent a short amount of time at a prison camp in Canton, Mississippi, then was transferred to Cahaba Prison (Alabama), followed by transfer to Andersonville Prison (Georgia), and finally Florence Stockade in South Carolina. The majority of Grigsby's time as a POW, more than six months, was spent at Andersonville.

Grigsby escaped once, but was quickly recaptured. On January 10, 1865, he escaped from Florence Stockade. Having been apprised of the Union Army's progress through updates from newly captured soldiers brought into the prison, Grigsby decided to proceed south in hopes of meeting up with units of William T. Sherman’s force that was then in Savannah, Georgia as part of Sherman's March to the Sea. Grigsby reached Union lines on February 1, and remained with Sherman's troops until they reached Goldsboro, North Carolina in March.

== Post-Civil War ==
Grigsby was discharged at the end of the war and returned to Wisconsin. He attended the University of Wisconsin–Madison for a year, then transferred to the Platteville Normal School, from which he graduated in 1869.

After completing his education, Grigsby was a teacher and principal at the high school in Horicon, Wisconsin for a year, then served in a similar position at the high school in Darlington, Wisconsin. He was principal of the elementary school in Delavan, Wisconsin from 1871 to 1872. Grigsby studied law while teaching school, and completed his studies under attorney William Pitt Dewey of Lancaster. He attained admission to the bar in the summer of 1872 and then undertook a trip to find a location in the Northwestern United States where he could establish a legal practice.

== Move to South Dakota ==
In late June 1872, Grigsby arrived in Sioux Falls, Dakota Territory and decided to remain. He entered into a law practice and land selling partnership with Richard F. Pettigrew, which they maintained for four years. In 1877, Grigsby went into banking as the partner of George M. Smith, and they owned and operated the Bank of Egan, and later the Union Bank of Elk Point, both of which Grigsby served as the first president.

Grigsby also became active in politics as a Republican, and served for two years as clerk of the courts for Minnehaha County, and two terms as a Sioux Falls city alderman. In 1886, Grigsby nearly won the party's nomination for Delegate to Congress, and later that year he won a term in the territorial House of Representatives.

In the mid-1890s, Grigsby became an advocate of the free silver position with respect to US monetary policy, as well as other reform movements that led to the creation of the People's Party. He was an unsuccessful candidate for the South Dakota Senate in 1894, but in 1896, he ran successfully for South Dakota Attorney General, defeating the nominees of the Republican and Prohibition parties.

As attorney general, Grigsby was responsible for ending the investigation into supposedly missing funds in the office of the State Auditor. After reviewing the allegations of the public examiner who made the charges, Grigsby reported that there were enough errors and inconsistencies in the allegations that he would decline to prosecute the current auditor and his predecessor.

== Spanish–American War ==
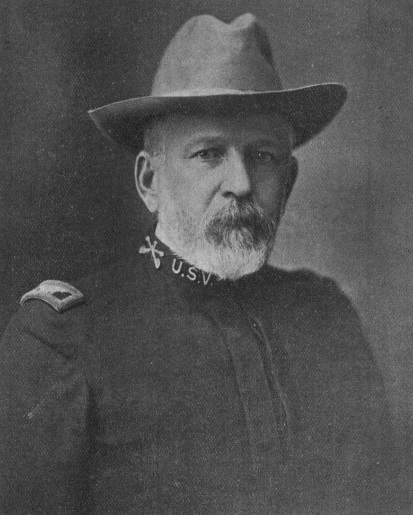
Frontispiece of 1900's Grigsby's Cowboys: Third United States Volunteer Cavalry, Spanish–American War.

At the start of the Spanish–American War in 1898, Grigsby offered his services to the federal government and volunteered to raise a cavalry unit from South Dakota and nearby states. Learning that Congress was considering legislation to allow the formation of volunteer regiments, he traveled to Washington, D.C. and succeeded in securing passage of an amendment that allowed for the raising of three cavalry regiments. As a result, the 1st Cavalry (Rough Riders) under Leonard Wood and Theodore Roosevelt, 2nd Cavalry (Rocky Mountain Riders) under Jay L. Torrey, and 3rd Cavalry (Grigsby's Cowboys) under Grigsby were recruited, organized and trained.

Grigsby commanded his regiment as a colonel during May and June 1898, which included its organization and training at Camp Thomas, Georgia. He was then promoted to command of 1st Cavalry Brigade, First Army Corps as an acting brigadier general, and he continued to lead the brigade until the end of the war. The Spanish–American War ended without the need for the 1st Cavalry Brigade to deploy overseas, and they were mustered out in September, 1899.

Grigsby remained interested in military service; in 1900, he offered to re-form his regiment and lead it to China to protect U.S. interests during the Boxer Rebellion. In 1904, he offered to raise a volunteer regiment to aid Japan during the Russo-Japanese War. Neither proposal was acted on by federal authorities.

== Later career ==
By 1900, Grigsby had returned to the Republican Party, in part because of a longstanding feud with Governor and Populist leader Andrew E. Lee. In May, 1902, President Theodore Roosevelt nominated Grigsby as United States Attorney for the Territory of Alaska’s second judicial district, based in Nome. He was confirmed in June, and served until resigning in May, 1904. Grigsby's tenure was controversial – he had not been recommended for the position by South Dakota's congressional delegation, and he was later reprimanded by the Attorney General for spending part of the winter of 1903 outside Alaska despite explicit instructions not to leave.

In January 1904, Grigsby was accused of accepting a $10,000 bribe disguised as a legal fee in exchange for foregoing prosecution of an Alaska oil company. He was exonerated of the bribery charge in March, and resigned in May, to be effective beginning in July. Grigsby claimed that he was being supplanted because of favoritism and that he had taken the position in Alaska only to help one his sons, George Barnes Grigsby, establish a career of his own in Alaska. In fact, Grisby's successor was Henry M. Hoyt, a cousin of the U.S. Solicitor General, also named Henry M. Hoyt. In addition, George Grigsby, who had served as his father's Assistant U.S. Attorney, continued in the same position under Hoyt, and later served as U.S. Attorney himself.

Grigsby continued to practice law in Sioux Falls, and remained interested in politics, including attending Theodore Roosevelt's 1905 inauguration. In addition, he was a sought-after public speaker, and was frequently called on to provide orations at Independence Day and Memorial Day commemorations and other public events.

In 1912, Grigsby was a supporter of Theodore Roosevelt's Progressive candidacy for president. He remained in the Republican Party and was a candidate for U.S. Senator, but lost the Republican nomination to Thomas Sterling, a fellow Roosevelt Republican who went on to win the general election.

When conflict between factions in the Mexican Civil War led to the possibility of U.S. military action to defend the U.S.-Mexico border, Grigsby offered to raise a volunteer force and lead it to Texas, but the federal government relied on mobilized National Guard units rather than volunteers to perform this mission. In 1916, Grigsby was again a supporter of Roosevelt for president, and ran unsuccessfully for delegate to the Republican National Convention.

== Death and burial ==
In 1916, Grigsby was diagnosed with anemia, and he spent time at a sanitorium in Battle Creek, Michigan to receive treatment. In January 1917, Grigsby announced a new law firm with his son John as his partner, and published accounts indicated he was also active in founding and managing the Stockyards Bank of Sioux Falls. He became ill later that month, and was diagnosed with pneumonia in addition to his anemic condition. He decided to travel to Birmingham, Alabama in the hopes that a warmer climate might prove restorative, but his health continued to decline, and he died in Birmingham on February 15, 1917. Grigsby was buried at Mount Pleasant Cemetery in Sioux Falls.

== Family ==
In March 1873, Grigsby married Fannie Lou Kingsbury (1847-1924) in Delavan, Wisconsin. They were the parents of Sioux, George, Fannie, and John.

Sioux K. Grigsby served in both houses of the South Dakota legislature, and was lieutenant governor from 1945 to 1949.

George Barnes Grigsby served as U.S. Attorney in Nome, Alaska, Nome's mayor, Alaska Territory's first attorney general, and as Alaska Territory's Delegate to Congress.

Fannie Lou Grigsby (1888-1985) married George Edwin Robinson. She was a professional musician, and after graduating from Chicago Musical College, she taught at Wheaton College and was the piano accompanist for the Chicago Opera Company.

John T. Grigsby was a South Dakota attorney and politician, and served as lieutenant governor from 1929 to 1931.

== Author ==
In 1888, Grigsby authored a work on his Civil War experiences:

Grigsby, Melvin (1888). The Smoked Yank. Sioux Falls, SD: Dakota Bell Publishing – via HathiTrust.

== Sources ==
=== Books ===
- Kingsbury, George W. (1915). Smith, George M. (ed.). History of Dakota Territory. Vol. 5. Chicago, IL: S. J. Clarke Publishing.
- Sues, Otto Louis (1900). Grigsby's Cowboys: Third United States Volunteer Cavalry, Spanish–American War. Salem, SD: James E. Patten.

=== Magazines ===
- Grigsby, Lutha (November 1, 1995). "Colonel Melvin Grigsby and Family" (PDF). National Grigsby Family Society Newsletter. GrigsbyFoundation.org. Archived from the original (PDF) on February 25, 2019.

=== Internet ===
- "Grave of Melvin Grigsby, Mount Pleasant Cemetery, Sioux Falls, Minnehaha County, South Dakota". South Dakota Gravestones. South Dakota Gravestone Photo Project. August 4, 2015.

=== Newspapers ===
- "Report is Erroneous". Argus Leader. Sioux Falls, SD. September 20, 1897 – via Newspapers.com.
- "Hon. Melvin Grigsby of the Rough Riders". The Bismarck Tribune. Bismarck, ND. May 25, 1900 – via Newspapers.com.
- "Rough Riders Ready". St. Paul Globe. St. Paul, MN. July 21, 1900 – via Newspapers.com.
- "Gen. Grigsby Is Named". Argus Leader. Sioux Falls, SD. May 28, 1902 – via Newspapers.com.
- "Appointment of Col. Melvin Grigsby is Confirmed". Argus Leader. Sioux Falls, SD. June 25, 1902 – via Newspapers.com.
- "Col. Grigsby has a Scheme: Would Send Rough Riders to Help Japan". Lead Daily Call. Lead, SD. February 13, 1904 – via Newspapers.com.
- "Hon. Melvin Grigsby district attorney for the Nome district in Alaska has resigned to take effect July 1". Argus Leader. Sioux Falls, SD. May 4, 1904 – via Newspapers.com.
- "Colonel Grigsby Returns to the State". Lead Daily Tribune. Lead, SD. August 26, 1904 – via Newspapers.com.
- "Indians Get Land". Argus Leader. Sioux Falls, SD. March 22, 1905 – via Newspapers.com.
- "Col. Melvin Grigsby of Sioux Falls Will Give the Principal Address". The Saturday News. Watertown, SD. May 26, 1911 – via Newspapers.com.
- "Grigs's Stock on Boom". Argus Leader. Sioux Falls, SD. June 1, 1912 – via Newspapers.com.
- "Sterling Not Sure". The Saturday News. Watertown, SD. December 12, 1912 – via Newspapers.com.
- "Col. Grigsby's Rough Riders: If War is Declared with Mexico, Col. Melvin Grigsby Will Go to the Front". Argus Leader. Sioux Falls, SD. April 21, 1914 – via Newspapers.com.
- "Demuth Wins for Delegate". The Mitchell Capital. Mitchell, SD. June 1, 1916 – via Newspapers.com.
- "Form New Law Firm of Grigsby & Grigsby". Argus Leader. Sioux Falls, SD. January 15, 1917 – via Newspapers.com.
- "Col. Melvin Grigsby is Called by Death". Argus Leader. Sioux Falls, SD. February 16, 1917 – via Newspapers.com.
- Bartlett, Bob (July 18, 1962). "Colorful Figure Fades From Scene". Fairbanks Daily News-Miner. fairbanks, AK – via Newspapers.com.

Legal offices
Preceded by Coe I. Crawford	Attorney General of South Dakota; 1897–1899	Succeeded by John L. Pyle
