= Huron Colony, South Dakota =

- Census-designated place
- Location within South Dakota Location within the United States
- Coordinates: 44°33′48″N 98°12′20″W
- Country: United States
- State: South Dakota
- County: Beadle

Area
  - Total: 0.22 sq mi (0.58 km^{2})
  - Land: 0.22 sq mi (0.58 km^{2})
  - Water: 0 sq mi (0.00 km^{2})
- Elevation: 1,260 ft (380 m)

Population (2020)
  - Total: 2
  - Density: 9.0/sq mi (3.46/km^{2})
- Time zone: UTC-6 (Central (CST))
  - Summer (DST): UTC-5 (CDT)
- ZIP Code: 57350 (Huron)
- Area code: 605
- FIPS code: 46-31140
- GNIS feature ID: 2812993

Huron Colony is a Hutterite colony and census-designated place (CDP) in Beadle County, South Dakota, United States. It was first listed as a CDP prior to the 2020 census. The population of the CDP was 2 at the 2020 census.

It is in the northern part of the county, on the northeast side of the James River. It is 15 miles (24 km) north of Huron, the county seat, off South Dakota Highway 37.

== Demographics ==
Historical population
Census	Pop.	Note	%±
2020	2		—
U.S. Decennial Census
