= Huron School District (South Dakota) =

Public school district in South Dakota, US

Location
- 150 5th St. SW Huron, South Dakota, 57350; United States

District information
- Type: Public
- Motto: Pride, Respect, Excellence for All
- Grades: K–12
- Established: 1886
- Superintendent: Dr. Kraig Steinhoff
- Accreditation: South Dakota Board of Education
- Schools: 9
- Budget: $ 40,743,000 (2022-2023)

Students and staff
- Students: 2933 (2022–23)
- Staff: 490
- Athletic conference: ESD
- District mascot: Tigers
- Colors: Orange, white and black

Other information
- Website: www.huron.k12.sd.us

The Huron School District 02-2 is a public school district in Huron, South Dakota, United States. It contains four elementary schools, a middle school, a vocational school, Huron High School, two Hutterite colonies and an alternative high school. The school district owns and operated the local arena and the former Si Tanka University sports center. Huron School District is a member of the South Dakota High School Activities Association. It offers special education, Title I, and a large ESL program.

The voters in the Huron School District are voting on a $22.165 million bond issue to remodel and add to the current elementary school due to its limited space and poor conditions.

Most of the district is in Beadle County, where it includes Huron, Morningside, and Riverside Colony. A portion is in Sanborn County.

== History ==
The Huron School District was founded in 1880 with 15 students in a converted store in downtown Huron. They stayed there until the first school buildings were ready to be used.

- The school district owns and operates the city arena, built in 1950 at a cost of $900,000 and renovated throughout the 2000s.
- Huron bought the Huron University Activities Center in 2008.
- The original football stadium stood from 1937-1974 and is now a residential section with street names including Quarterback Court and Gridiron Place.
- The current football stadium with full track and field was built in 1974.

The following is list of former and current schools operated by the district.

- Hamilton School, 1882-?
- First Jefferson, 1886-1927
- Second Jefferson, 1927–present
- First High School, 1904-1914, renovated 1919, 1937; served as the first junior high school; demolished 1999
- Second High School, 1914-1967 demolished 1967
- Third High School, 1967–present; renovated 2009 office expanded and remodeled 2020
- McKinley, 1921-1998; added on in 1960; the 1998 demotion was on the 1921 building now the home to the local Head Start
- Middle School, 1999–present
- Madison School, 1956–present; remodeled/expanded in 1960, 2012, 2013
- Lincoln School, 1910-1975; razed to make way for Lincoln Square Apartments
- Huron Vocational School, built in 1977
- Washington School, 1954–present
- Buchanan School, 1961–present; expanded in 1970, 1996

== Athletics ==
Huron high school team name is Huron Tigers. The school has athletic teams for boys' football, basketball, wrestling, track, cross-country, tennis, golf, and soccer. Teams for girls include volleyball, basketball, track, cross country, gymnastics, tennis, golf, competitive cheer and dance, and soccer

State Championships:

- Boys Basketball - 1917, 1927, 1930, 1936, 1937, 1945, 1958, 1973, 1981, 1993, 2004
- Girls Basketball - 1989
- Boys Cross country - 1983, 1989
- Girls Cross country - 1978, 1981, 1987, 1989
- Boys Football - 1992
- Boys Track - 1910, 1911, 1952
- Boys Wrestling - 1994
- Boys Golf - 1939, 1942, 1963, 1974
- Girls Volleyball - 1998, 1999

== Notable alumni ==
- Jennifer Hart, perpetrator of the Hart family murders
- Cheryl Ladd - actress and singer, Charlie's Angels. Born Cheryl Jean Stoppelmoor in Huron, SD on July 12, 1951.
- Gladys Pyle - United States Senator, 1938–1939. First woman ever elected United States Senator from South Dakota was born in Huron on October 4, 1890.
