= Nikko Briteramos =

American basketball player

Nikko Briteramos (born June 22, 1983, in Chicago, Illinois) is a former Huron University basketball player convicted in 2002 for not informing his partner of his HIV status before having sex. He received national attention after he was the first person arrested under a South Dakota law requiring that persons inform prospective sexual partners that they are HIV positive. He became the central subject of wide-ranging ethical and philosophical debates regarding the unconstitutionality and illegitimacy of partner notification law.

In March 2002, he allegedly participated in a "Post 9-11" Red Cross" blood drive. Several weeks later he was informed by Red Cross officials that the donation that he gave was flagged for HIV.

Briteramos admitted having unprotected sex with the woman in his dorm on April 13. The woman later tested negative for HIV. He was arrested after Health Department officials discovered Briteramos and the woman in his dorm room. Briteramos gave health officials the names of at least 10 other women with whom he had unprotected sex in recent months. Two tested positive for HIV. Those two listed 50 recent partners between them. Authorities said there were dozens, quite possibly hundreds more, who may have been exposed to the deadly virus through a web of sexual contacts. He was initially charged with three counts of intentional exposure to the AIDS virus. Two counts were dropped in exchange for his guilty plea.

He pled guilty to one count of "Intentional Exposure to HIV" and received a suspended sentence of five years, 120 days in jail, and 200 hours community service plus fines. According to the plea deal he was to register for school where later found out that he had lost his scholarship. He was eventually arrested for violating the terms of his probation for having spent five hours registering for classes and tested positive for marijuana when he returned to jail. Briteramos spent 18 months in the South Dakota State Penitentiary.

Following his release from prison, the 6 foot-9 inch Briteramos played in 2005–06 for Chicago State University. He was not drafted by the NBA in 2006.

In July 2018, Briteramos filed a complaint against a Los Angeles barbershop that reportedly denied him service due to his HIV status. The complaint was settled in June 2019 when Briteramos was granted a defualt judgement after the defendant did not respond to the filing or appear at the hearing. He was awarded $75,000 in damages.
