= Lake Byron (South Dakota) =

Lake in the state of South Dakota, United States

- Location within South Dakota Location within the United States
- Location: Beadle County, South Dakota
- Coordinates: 44°34′18″N 98°08′02″W
- Type: Natural lake
- Primary inflows: Foster Creek
- Primary outflows: James River
- Catchment area: 115,350 acres (466.8 km^{2})
- Basin countries: United States
- Surface area: 1,805 acres (7.30 km^{2})
- Max. depth: 10 feet (3.0 m)
- Surface elevation: 1,250 ft (380 m)
- Islands: none

Lake Byron is a lake in Beadle County, South Dakota, U.S.; it is fed by Foster Creek and feeds out to the James River.

The lake derives its name of Byron Pay, who stayed briefly at the lake in the 1860s and left his name carved on a tree there.

The Albert S. Piper Homestead Claim Shanty is about two miles north, and the Milford Hutterite Colony is to the northeast.

== Fish ==
Species of game fish in the lake include walleye, yellow perch, and black crappies. The lake also supports populations of Northern pike, black bullheads, and common carp. The lake is relatively shallow, and a number of winter-related fish kills have occurred there.

Lake Byron contains a public access boat ramp and is the location of 'Byron Bible Camp'.

== See also ==
- List of lakes in South Dakota
- Bethel Church
