= Royal C. Johnson =

American soldier and politician

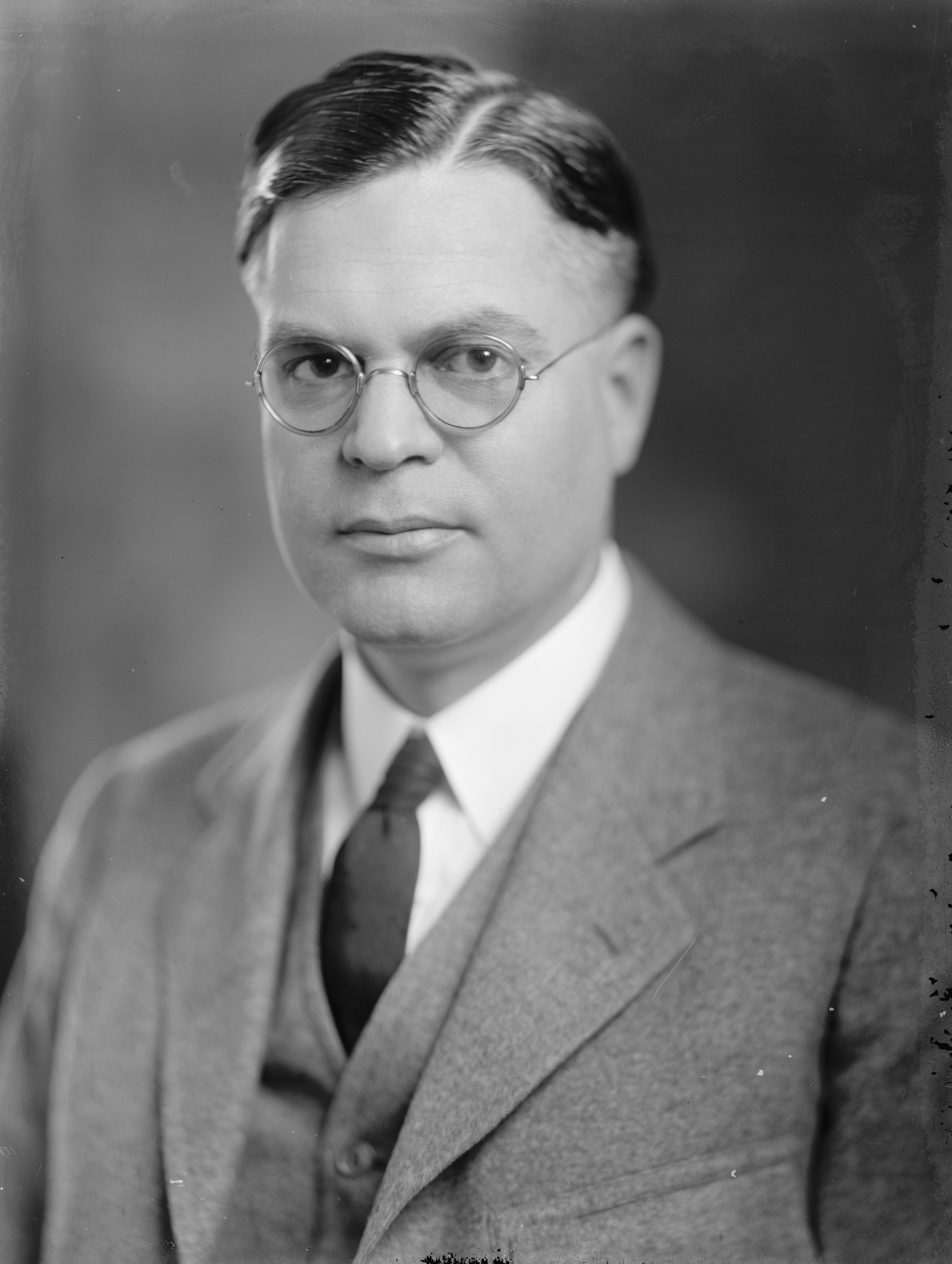

Member of the U.S. House of Representatives from South Dakota's 2nd district
- In office March 4, 1915 – March 3, 1933
- Preceded by: Charles H. Burke
- Succeeded by: Theodore B. Werner

8th Attorney General of South Dakota
- In office 1911–1915
- Governor: Robert S. Vessey; Frank M. Byrne
- Preceded by: S. Wesley Clark
- Succeeded by: Clarence C. Caldwell

Personal details
- Born: Royal Cleaves Johnson; October 3, 1882 Cherokee, Iowa, U.S.
- Died: August 2, 1939 (aged 56) Washington, D.C., U.S.
- Party: Republican
- Education: University of South Dakota School of Law
- Occupation: Attorney

Military service
- Allegiance: United States
- Branch/service: United States Army
- Rank: Captain
- Unit: Company K, 313th Infantry, 79th Division
- Battles/wars: World War I; Meuse-Argonne (WIA); Defensive Sector
- Awards: Distinguished Service Cross; War Cross 1914–1918 (France)

Royal Cleaves Johnson (October 3, 1882 – August 2, 1939) was a U.S. representative from South Dakota and a highly decorated veteran of World War I while he was still a member of Congress. Despite voting against United States declaration of war on Germany, he took a leave of absence from Congress to enlist. He became a highly decorated veteran receiving the Distinguished Service Cross from the United States government. He also received the War Cross 1914–1918 from the French government.

== Early life and education ==
Royal Cleaves Johnson was born in Cherokee, Iowa in 1882. He moved with his parents to Highmore, South Dakota in 1883, and attended the public schools. He graduated from the University of South Dakota School of Law in 1906, and was admitted to the bar that same year.

== Career ==
He started his practice in Highmore. He became the assistant state's attorney for Hyde County in 1906, and State's Attorney in 1908 and 1909. In 1910, he became the Attorney General of South Dakota. In 1913, he moved to Aberdeen, South Dakota and returned to private practice. He was elected to the United States House of Representatives in 1915, serving through the end of the Seventy-Second Congress in 1932. He was the chairman for the Committee on Expenditures in the Department of War (1921–1925), and the Committee on World War Veteran's Legislation (1929–1932). He was not a candidate for reelection in 1932.

== World War I ==
In 1918, even though he had on April 5, 1917, voted against declaring war on Germany, he absented himself from the Congress and enlisted in the United States Army to fight in World War I. He served in the 313th Infantry Regiment as a private, sergeant, second lieutenant, and first lieutenant. In Montfaucon, France, on the 26th and 27 September 1918, he was involved in a combat situation wherein he repeatedly exposed himself to enemy fire and was wounded by an exploding shell. Although severely wounded, he accompanied two of his fellow soldiers to the rear and refused space in an ambulance until his comrades were cared for. For this, he received the Distinguished Service Cross from the United States government, the citation for which reads:

The President of the United States of America, authorized by Act of Congress, July 9, 1918, takes pleasure in presenting the Distinguished Service Cross to First Lieutenant (Infantry) Royal Cleaves Johnson, United States Army, for extraordinary heroism in action while serving with 313th Infantry Regiment, 79th Division, A.E.F., at Montfaucon, France, September 26–27, 1918. Lieutenant Johnson constantly exposed himself to the enemy fire during the action at Montfaucon, setting an example to his men by his fearlessness. When severely wounded by shell fire, he assisted two wounded men of his company to the rear and refused to occupy space in the ambulance until these men had been provided for.

He also received the Croix de Guerre with gold star from the Republic of France.

== The American Legion ==
After Johnson returned from the war, he resumed his seat in Congress. Johnson was the House sponsor of legislation to create a federal charter for The American Legion. The Senate co-sponsor was Sen. Josiah Wolcott of Delaware. The bill was filed on June 27, 1919, passed the House on August 27, passed the Senate on September 5 and was signed by President Wilson on September 16, 1919.

== Later life ==
In 1930, in a speech before the US War Policies Commission, Johnson advocated for legislation that called for the mandatory conscription of "everything", including all private property and all United States citizens, should war be declared. The proposal was intended to address war profiteering, in solidarity with members of the American armed forces.

Upon retiring from the House, Johnson continued to practice law in Washington, D.C., until his death there in 1939. He was buried at Arlington National Cemetery. In 1953 he was posthumously awarded the Distinguished Service Medal by The American Legion.

== Legacy ==
The Veterans Administration hospital in Sioux Falls, South Dakota, The Royal C. Johnson Veterans Memorial Medical Center, is named in his honor.

== Awards ==
Johnson's awards and decorations included the following:

U.S. military decorations
Distinguished Service Cross
U.S. nonmilitary decorations
World War I Victory Medal (with two bronze service stars)
Foreign military decorations
War Cross 1914–1918 (France)

== See also ==
- List of members of the American Legion

Party political offices
Preceded by S. Wesley Clark	Republican nominee for Attorney General of South Dakota; 1910, 1912	Succeeded by Clarence C. Caldwell
Legal offices
Preceded by S. Wesley Clark	Attorney General of South Dakota; 1911–1915	Succeeded by Clarence C. Caldwell
U.S. House of Representatives
Preceded by Charles H. Burke	United States Representative (2nd district) for South Dakota; 1915–1933	Succeeded by Theodore B. Werner
