= Burke Act =

1906 amendment to the Dawes Act

- Other short titles: General Allotment Act Amendment of 1906
- Long title: An Act to amend section six of an act approved February eighth, eighteen hundred and eighty-seven, entitled "An Act to provide for the allotment of lands in severalty to Indians on the various reservations, and to extend the protection of the laws of the United States and the Territories over the Indians, and for other purposes.
- Nicknames: Dawes Act Amendment of 1906
- Enacted by: the 59th United States Congress
- Effective: May 8, 1906

Citations
- Public law: Pub. L. 59–149
- Statutes at Large: 34 Stat. 182

Codification
- Titles amended: 25 U.S.C.: Indians
- U.S.C. sections amended: 25 U.S.C. ch. 9 § 349

Legislative history
- Introduced in the House as H.R. 11946 by Charles H. Burke (R–SD); Signed into law by President Theodore Roosevelt on May 8, 1906

The Burke Act (1906), formally known as the General Allotment Act Amendment of 1906 and also called the Forced Fee Patenting Act, amended the Dawes Act of 1887 under which the communal land held by tribes on the Indian reservations was broken up and distributed in severalty to individual households of tribal members. It required the government to assess whether individuals were "competent and capable" before giving them fee simple patents to their allotted land.

Because the federal government believed that many Indians were not prepared for United States citizenship, the act further provided that citizenship will not be granted to Native American individuals until at the time of the final validation of their trust patents instead of upon the receipt of the trust patents, as stated in the Dawes Act. Those who were issued fee simple patents were granted citizenship upon receipt. Those whose land remained in trust status were to be granted citizenship at the conclusion of the twenty-five year trust period.

It was named for U. S. Congressman Charles H. Burke.

== Background ==
=== Competence ===
The Burke Act amended the GAA to provide for the Secretary of the Interior to assess individual Native Americans as ‘competent and capable.’ before issuing any person receiving a land allotment a patent in fee simple. Receiving a fee simple patent meant that the land of the allotee would be removed from federal trust status and made subject to taxation. The allotee would be able to sell it on the private market.

The act reads:

“..the Secretary of the Interior may, in his discretion, and he is hereby authorized, whenever he shall be satisfied that any Indian allottee is competent and capable of managing his or her affairs at any time to cause to be issued to such allottee a patent in fee simple, and thereafter all restrictions as to sale, incumbrance [sic], or taxation of said land shall be removed.”

Studies have shown that Bureau of Indian Affairs officials tended first to classify people as 'competent and capable' if they were of mixed-race (with some European ancestry).

The following passage from the 1913 annual report from the Pine Ridge Indian Reservation reveals that the supervisor of the reservation expected eventual dispossession of land after individual Lakota people had been issued fee patent.

The Burke Act had other consequences. In some cases, individual Indians deemed "competent" were not notified of the status and were not informed that their land's status had shifted from trust land to fee patent. As a result, individual owners did not realize the land was subject to taxation. After a period of taxes being unpaid, local or state jurisdictions could sell the land without the owner's consent to pay past taxes.
