= Theodore B. Werner =

American politician

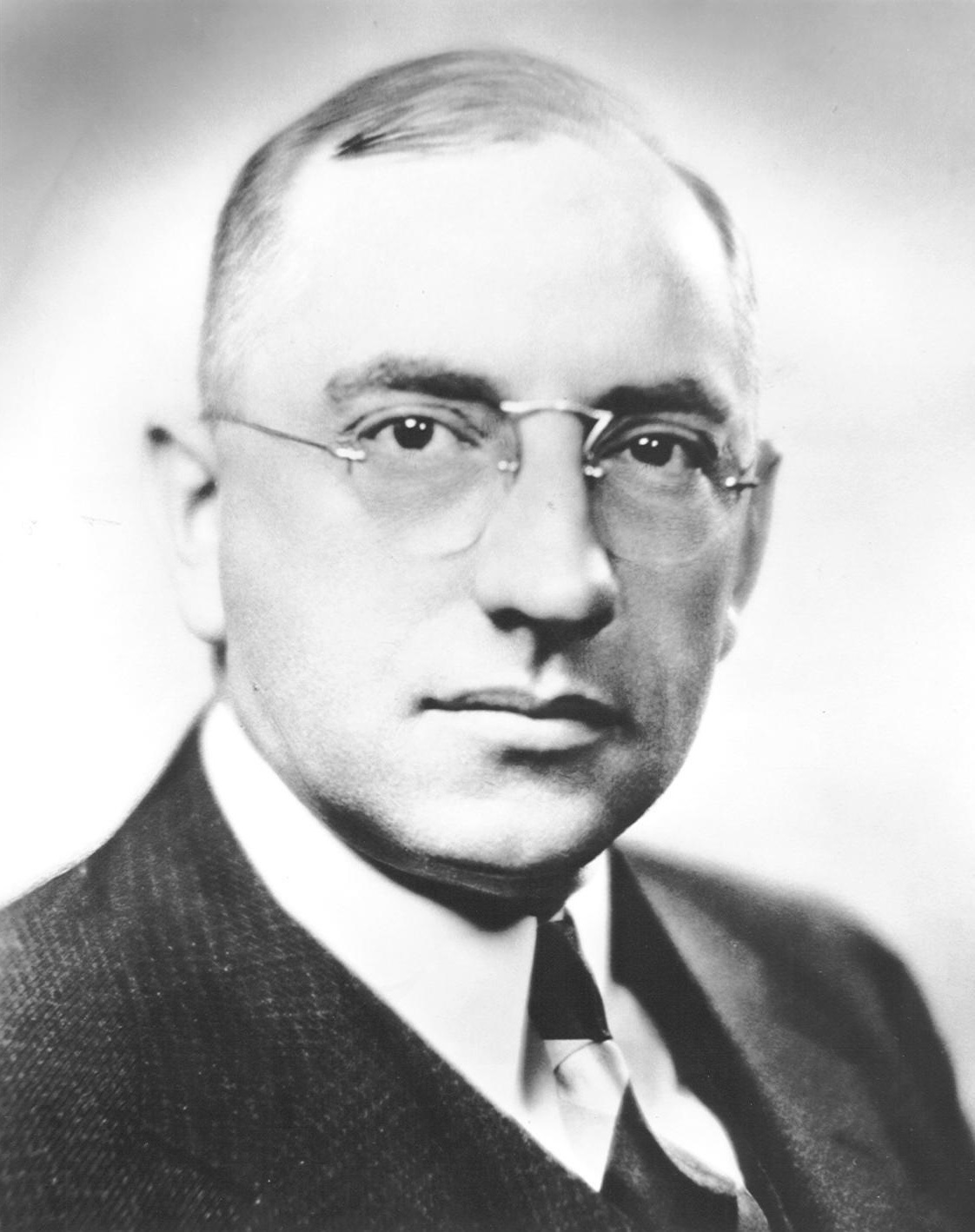
- Theodore B. Werner

Mayor of Rapid City, South Dakota
- In office 1929–1930
- Preceded by: Eugene Bangs
- Succeeded by: Winfield Morrill

Member of the U.S. House of Representatives from South Dakota's 2nd district
- In office March 4, 1933 – January 3, 1937
- Preceded by: Royal C. Johnson
- Succeeded by: Francis H. Case

Personal details
- Born: June 2, 1892 Ossian, Iowa, U.S.
- Died: January 24, 1989 (aged 96) Rapid City, South Dakota, U.S.
- Party: Democratic

Theodore B. Werner (June 2, 1892 – January 24, 1989) was a U.S. Democratic politician who served as a member of Congress from South Dakota.

== Early life and education ==
Werner was born in Ossian, Iowa to German immigrants. He attended parochial schools in Iowa, after which he studied law in Illinois and Wisconsin.

== Career ==
In 1909 Werner moved to Rapid City, South Dakota, where he became involved in the newspaper and commercial printing businesses. He became editor and publisher of the weekly Gate City Guide in 1912, and continued as publisher until 1965.

== Political career ==
He was Rapid City's Postmaster from 1915 to 1923. He was a City Commissioner from 1927 to 1930, and served as Rapid City's Mayor in 1929 and 1930. In 1930 he was an unsuccessful candidate for Congress.

In 1932 Werner was elected to the United States House of Representatives. He was reelected in 1934 and served from March 4, 1933 to January 3, 1937. He lost his 1936 bid for reelection to Francis H. Case.

In 1947 Werner was appointed United States Marshal for South Dakota, and he served until 1951.

He died in Rapid City on January 24, 1989, and was buried in Rapid City's Mountain View Cemetery.

== Sources ==
- United States Congress. "Theodore B. Werner (id: W000299)". Biographical Directory of the United States Congress.
- Theodore B. Werner at United States Marshals Service
- Theodore B. Werner at Rapid City Public Library

U.S. House of Representatives
Preceded by Royal C. Johnson	United States Representative (2nd district) for South Dakota; 1933–1937	Succeeded by Francis H. Case
