= Iroquois, South Dakota =

- City
- Location in Beadle County (and Kingsbury County) and the state of South Dakota and the state of South Dakota
- Coordinates: 44°22′04″N 97°50′28″W
- Country: United States
- State: South Dakota
- Counties: Kingsbury, Beadle
- Incorporated: 1887

Area
  - Total: 0.62 sq mi (1.61 km^{2})
  - Land: 0.62 sq mi (1.61 km^{2})
  - Water: 0 sq mi (0.00 km^{2})
- Elevation: 1,394 ft (425 m)

Population (2020)
  - Total: 292
  - Density: 471/sq mi (181.7/km^{2})
- Time zone: UTC-6 (Central (CST))
  - Summer (DST): UTC-5 (CDT)
- ZIP code: 57353
- Area code: 605
- FIPS code: 46-32020
- GNIS feature ID: 1267438

Iroquois is a city on the border of Beadle and Kingsbury counties in South Dakota, United States. The population was 292 at the 2020 census. The school building (K–12) is located in Kingsbury County, while the school parking lot is located in Beadle County. Highway 14 runs directly through Iroquois.

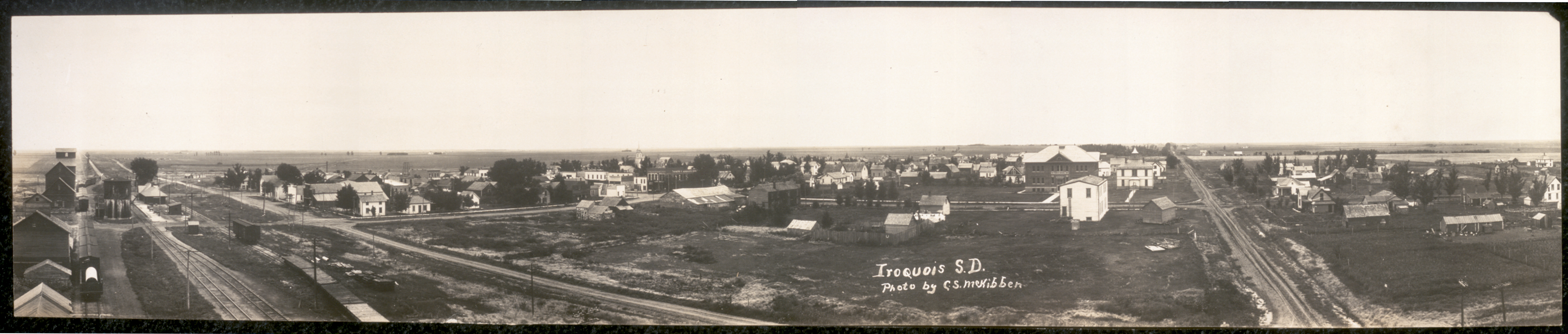
Panorama of Iroquois from 1912

== History ==
Iroquois was laid out in 1880. The city was named after the Haudenosaunee (Iroquois) people. A post office called Iroquois has been in operation since 1880.

== Geography ==
According to the United States Census Bureau, the city has a total area of 0.62 square miles (1.61 km^{2}), all land.

== Demographics ==
Historical population
Census	Pop.	Note	%±
1890	181		—
1900	276		52.5%
1910	578		109.4%
1920	651		12.6%
1930	531		−18.4%
1940	413		−22.2%
1950	413		0.0%
1960	385		−6.8%
1970	375		−2.6%
1980	348		−7.2%
1990	328		−5.7%
2000	278		−15.2%
2010	266		−4.3%
2020	292		9.8%
U.S. Decennial Census

=== 2020 census ===
As of the 2020 census, Iroquois had a population of 292. The median age was 40.3 years. 27.4% of residents were under the age of 18 and 15.4% of residents were 65 years of age or older. For every 100 females there were 117.9 males, and for every 100 females age 18 and over there were 116.3 males age 18 and over.

As of the 2020 census, 0.0% of residents lived in urban areas, while 100.0% lived in rural areas.

There were 124 households in Iroquois, of which 33.1% had children under the age of 18 living in them. Of all households, 55.6% were married-couple households, 21.0% were households with a male householder and no spouse or partner present, and 12.9% were households with a female householder and no spouse or partner present. About 21.8% of all households were made up of individuals and 4.8% had someone living alone who was 65 years of age or older.

There were 129 housing units, of which 3.9% were vacant. The homeowner vacancy rate was 0.0% and the rental vacancy rate was 7.1%.

Racial composition as of the 2020 census
Race	Number	Percent
White	289	99.0%
Black or African American	0	0.0%
American Indian and Alaska Native	0	0.0%
Asian	0	0.0%
Native Hawaiian and Other Pacific Islander	1	0.3%
Some other race	0	0.0%
Two or more races	2	0.7%
Hispanic or Latino (of any race)	3	1.0%

=== 2010 census ===
As of the census of 2010, there were 266 people, 119 households, and 76 families residing in the city. The population density was 429.0 inhabitants per square mile (165.6/km^{2}). There were 135 housing units at an average density of 217.7 per square mile (84.1/km^{2}). The racial makeup of the city was 98.5% White and 1.5% from two or more races. Hispanic or Latino of any race were 0.4% of the population.

There were 119 households, of which 25.2% had children under the age of 18 living with them, 54.6% were married couples living together, 5.0% had a female householder with no husband present, 4.2% had a male householder with no wife present, and 36.1% were non-families. 32.8% of all households were made up of individuals, and 13.5% had someone living alone who was 65 years of age or older. The average household size was 2.24 and the average family size was 2.86.

The median age in the city was 40.6 years. 21.8% of residents were under the age of 18; 6.4% were between the ages of 18 and 24; 25.9% were from 25 to 44; 31.2% were from 45 to 64; and 14.7% were 65 years of age or older. The gender makeup of the city was 52.3% male and 47.7% female.

=== 2000 census ===
As of the census of 2000, there were 278 people, 113 households, and 77 families residing in the city. The population density was 521.0 inhabitants per square mile (201.2/km^{2}). There were 121 housing units at an average density of 226.7 per square mile (87.5/km^{2}). The racial makeup of the city was 95.68% White, 0.36% Native American, 0.36% Asian, 1.44% from other races, and 2.16% from two or more races. Hispanic or Latino of any race were 2.52% of the population.

There were 113 households, out of which 31.9% had children under the age of 18 living with them, 56.6% were married couples living together, 10.6% had a female householder with no husband present, and 31.0% were non-families. 31.0% of all households were made up of individuals, and 11.5% had someone living alone who was 65 years of age or older. The average household size was 2.46 and the average family size was 3.06.

In the city, the population was spread out, with 28.4% under the age of 18, 6.1% from 18 to 24, 28.8% from 25 to 44, 16.9% from 45 to 64, and 19.8% who were 65 years of age or older. The median age was 37 years. For every 100 females, there were 85.3 males. For every 100 females age 18 and over, there were 93.2 males.

The median income for a household in the city was $25,625, and the median income for a family was $36,250. Males had a median income of $25,417 versus $16,806 for females. The per capita income for the city was $13,277. About 18.8% of families and 17.4% of the population were below the poverty line, including 24.7% of those under the age of eighteen and 9.8% of those 65 or over.

== See also ==
- List of cities in South Dakota
