= Morningside, South Dakota =

- Census-designated place
- Location within South Dakota
- Coordinates: 44°21′59″N 98°11′01″W
- Country: United States
- State: South Dakota
- County: Beadle
- Township: Custer

Area
  - Total: 0.53 sq mi (1.36 km^{2})
  - Land: 0.52 sq mi (1.34 km^{2})
  - Water: 0.0077 sq mi (0.02 km^{2})
- Elevation: 1,280 ft (390 m)

Population (2020)
  - Total: 70
  - Density: 135.8/sq mi (52.43/km^{2})
- Time zone: UTC-6 (Central (CST))
  - Summer (DST): UTC-5 (CDT)
- Area code: 605
- FIPS code: 46-43780
- GNIS feature ID: 2584561

Morningside is a census-designated place (CDP) in Beadle County, South Dakota, United States. The population was 70 at the 2020 census.

== Geography ==
Morningside is located on the east side of the city of Huron, the Beadle County seat. The James River forms the western edge of Morningside and separates it from the center of Huron. An eastern extension of the city borders Morningside to the south. U.S. Route 14 forms the northern edge of Morningside and leads west into Huron and east 31 miles (50 km) to De Smet.

According to the United States Census Bureau, the Morningside CDP has a total area of 0.50 square miles (1.3 km^{2}), all land.

== Demographics ==
Historical population
Census	Pop.	Note	%±
2020	70		—
U.S. Decennial Census

== Education ==
It is in the Huron School District.
