= McMonies Barn =

- U.S. National Register of Historic Places
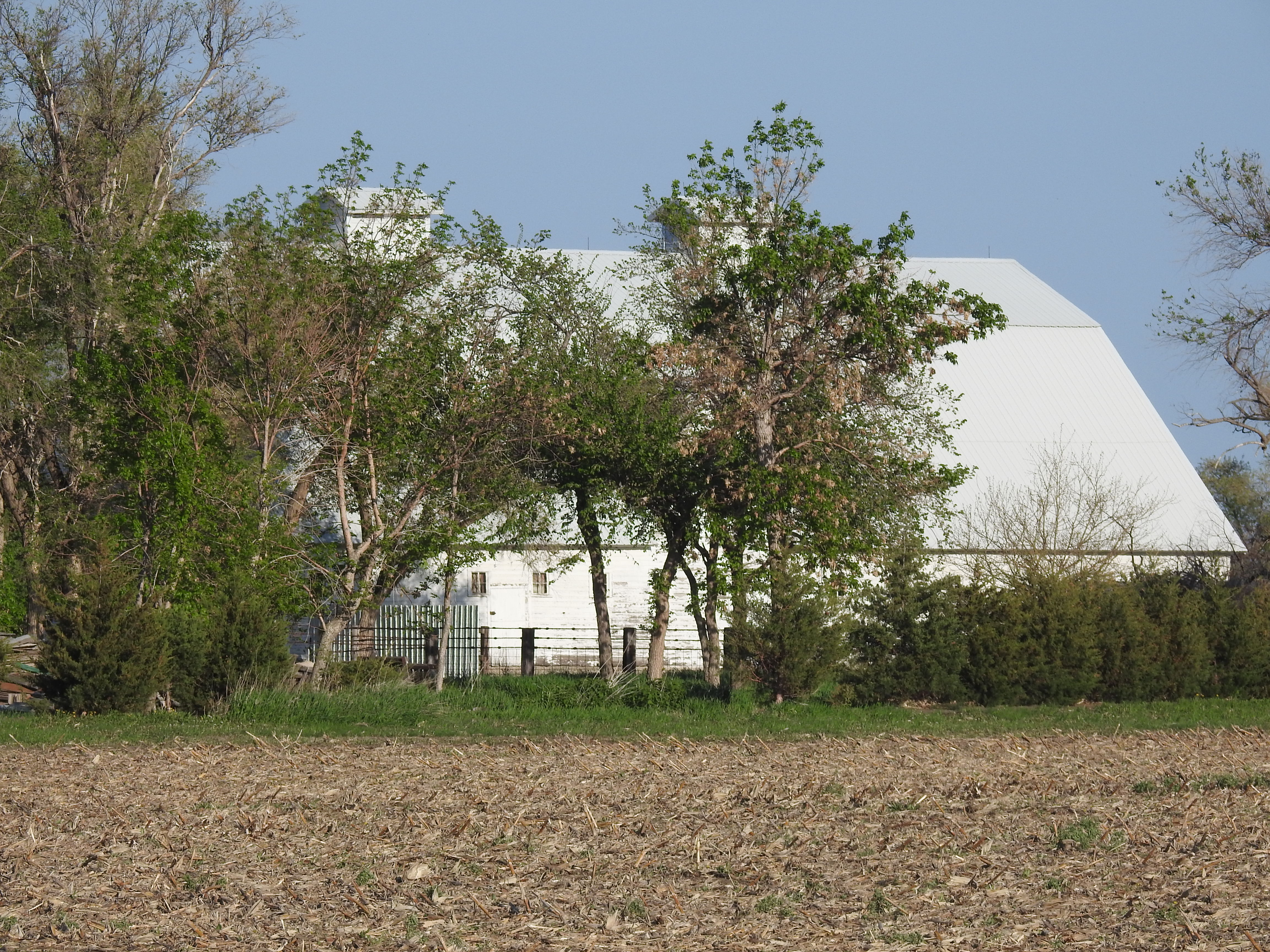

- Location within South Dakota
- Location: 604 33rd Street, S.E., near Huron, South Dakota
- Coordinates: 44.325217°N 98.203457°W
- Area: 1 acre (0.40 ha)
- Built: 1915
- Architectural style: Feeder Barn
- NRHP reference No.: 04000762
- Added to NRHP: July 28, 2004

The McMonies Barn, near Huron, South Dakota, was built in 1915. It was listed on the National Register of Historic Places in 2004.

It is a wood-framed feeder barn with a gambrel roof, on a cement foundation. It has also been known as the Mentzel Barn.
