= Broadland, South Dakota =

- Town
- Location in Beadle County and the state of South Dakota
- Coordinates: 44°29′38″N 98°20′47″W
- Country: United States
- State: South Dakota
- County: Beadle
- Incorporated: 1911

Area
  - Total: 1.01 sq mi (2.61 km^{2})
  - Land: 1.01 sq mi (2.61 km^{2})
  - Water: 0 sq mi (0.00 km^{2})
- Elevation: 1,303 ft (397 m)

Population (2020)
  - Total: 27
  - Density: 26.8/sq mi (10.35/km^{2})
- Time zone: UTC-6 (Central (CST))
  - Summer (DST): UTC-5 (CDT)
- ZIP code: 57350
- Area code: 605
- FIPS code: 46-07420
- GNIS feature ID: 2396603

Broadland is a town in Beadle County, South Dakota, United States. The population was 27 at the 2020 census.

== History ==
Broadland was laid out in 1881. It was named from the broad valley in which the town site is located.

== Geography ==
According to the United States Census Bureau, the town has a total area of 1.01 square miles (2.62 km^{2}), all land.

== Demographics ==
Historical population
Census	Pop.	Note	%±
1920	129		—
1930	102		−20.9%
1940	73		−28.4%
1950	74		1.4%
1960	33		−55.4%
1970	45		36.4%
1980	49		8.9%
1990	40		−18.4%
2000	38		−5.0%
2010	31		−18.4%
2020	27		−12.9%
U.S. Decennial Census

=== 2010 census ===
As of the census of 2010, there were 31 people, 13 households, and 10 families residing in the town. The population density was 30.7 inhabitants per square mile (11.9/km^{2}). There were 18 housing units at an average density of 17.8 per square mile (6.9/km^{2}). The racial makeup of the town was 100.0% White.

There were 13 households, of which 23.1% had children under the age of 18 living with them, 76.9% were married couples living together, and 23.1% were non-families. 23.1% of all households were made up of individuals, and 7.7% had someone living alone who was 65 years of age or older. The average household size was 2.38 and the average family size was 2.80.

The median age in the town was 50.8 years. 22.6% of residents were under the age of 18; 3.2% were between the ages of 18 and 24; 16.2% were from 25 to 44; 48.4% were from 45 to 64; and 9.7% were 65 years of age or older. The gender makeup of the town was 51.6% male and 48.4% female.

=== 2000 census ===
As of the census of 2000, there were 38 people, 14 households, and 11 families residing in the town. The population density was 38.0 inhabitants per square mile (14.7/km^{2}). There were 15 housing units at an average density of 15.0 per square mile (5.8/km^{2}). The racial makeup of the town was 100.00% White.

There were 14 households, out of which 42.9% had children under the age of 18 living with them, 71.4% were married couples living together, 7.1% had a female householder with no husband present, and 21.4% were non-families. 21.4% of all households were made up of individuals, and none had someone living alone who was 65 years of age or older. The average household size was 2.71 and the average family size was 3.18.

In the town, the population was spread out, with 28.9% under the age of 18, 5.3% from 18 to 24, 31.6% from 25 to 44, 23.7% from 45 to 64, and 10.5% who were 65 years of age or older. The median age was 40 years. For every 100 females, there were 100.0 males. For every 100 females age 18 and over, there were 107.7 males.

The median income for a household in the town was $34,583, and the median income for a family was $71,250. Males had a median income of $34,583 versus $100,000 for females. The per capita income for the town was $20,059. None of the population and none of the families were below the poverty line.

== See also ==
- List of towns in South Dakota
