= Philo Hall =

American politician

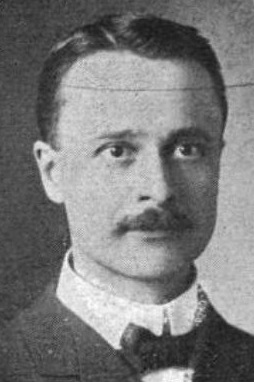

Member of the U.S. House of Representatives from South Dakota's at-large district
- In office March 4, 1907 – March 3, 1909
- Preceded by: Charles H. Burke
- Succeeded by: Charles H. Burke

6th Attorney General of South Dakota
- In office 1903–1907
- Governor: Charles N. Herreid; Samuel H. Elrod
- Preceded by: Adolphus W. Burtt
- Succeeded by: S. Wesley Clark

Member of the South Dakota Senate
- In office 1901–1903

Personal details
- Born: December 31, 1865 Wilton Township, Waseca County, Minnesota, U.S.
- Died: October 7, 1938 (aged 72) Brookings, South Dakota, U.S.
- Resting place: Greenwood Cemetery, Brookings, South Dakota, U.S.
- Party: Republican
- Education: South Dakota State University; Read Law under J.O. Andrews
- Occupation: Attorney

Philo Hall (December 31, 1865 – October 7, 1938) was a South Dakota attorney and politician. He served as Attorney General of South Dakota and a member of the United States House of Representatives.

== Early life and American Civil War ==
Philo Hall was born in Wilton Township, Waseca County, Minnesota on December 31, 1865, the son of Mary E. (Greene) and Philo Hall, a Union Army veteran in the First Minnesota Infantry Regiment, Company G during the American Civil War and direct descendant of Mayflower Compact signatory, John Alden. Philo and Mary (née Greene) Hall ran a hotel in Wilton, but the family moved to Brookings, Dakota Territory after the 1883 death of the senior Philo Hall.

The young Philo Hall was educated in Wilton and South Dakota State College. He then studied law under Judge J. O. Andrews, was admitted to the bar in 1887, and practiced in Brookings. He was one of the first members of The United States Congress and South Dakota state government to graduate from a South Dakota educational institution.

== Career ==
In 1890 Hall married Mary A. Cooke, and they were the parents of three children: Vivian (b. 1891); Philo, Jr. (b. 1895); and Morrell (b. 1898). A Republican, he was the prosecuting attorney for Brookings County from 1892 to 1898, and also served as city attorney for Brookings. In 1895 he was elected mayor of Brookings, and served one two-year term.

He served in the South Dakota State Senate from 1901 to 1903, and as Attorney General of South Dakota from 1903 through 1907.

In 1906 Hall was elected to Seat A, one of South Dakota's two at-large seats in the U.S. House, and he served one term, March 4, 1907 to March 3, 1909. He did not win renomination for a second term in 1908, and returned to the practice of the law.

Hall died in Brookings on October 7, 1938. He was buried at Greenwood Cemetery in Brookings.

Party political offices
Preceded by John L. Pyle	Republican nominee for Attorney General of South Dakota; 1902, 1904	Succeeded by S. Wesley Clark
Legal offices
Preceded by Adolphus W. Burtt	Attorney General of South Dakota; 1903–1907	Succeeded by S. Wesley Clark
