= Huron University =

Private university in Huron, South Dakota, US (1883–2005)

Coordinates: 44°21′26″N 98°13′09″W

- Type: Private (closed)
- Active: 1883; 143 years ago – 2005; 21 years ago
- Location: Huron, South Dakota, United States
- Affiliations: formerly NAIA Division II
- Nickname: Screaming Eagles
- Website: sitanka.edu at the Wayback Machine (archive index) huron.edu at the Wayback Machine (archive index)

Huron University, also known as Si Tanka University at Huron, was a private university formerly located in Huron, South Dakota, United States. Founded in 1883, it closed on April 1, 2005.

== History ==
=== Founding ===
What became Huron University was founded in 1883 as Presbyterian University of Southern Dakota, founded in Pierre while it was still Dakota Territory. A year later, the school became Pierre University, but was commonly known as Pierre College. On May 31, 1887, the university conferred its first degree, which was the first degree to be awarded in the Dakota Territory.

In 1897, the efforts of John L. Pyle, Mamie Shields Pyle, and other Huron residents led to the university's move to Huron, where it became Huron College. By 1915, the school had become accredited by the North Central Association of Colleges and Schools (NCA). Two years later one of its alumni won a Rhodes Scholarship and in 1932 one of its attending students also won the award. One student was George M. McCune, co-developer of the McCune–Reischauer romanization of Korean.

=== For-profit ownership ===
By the 1980s the school had fallen into debt. After the town of Huron agreed to take over existing debt as well as to purchase the school's Fine Arts Center for $1.5m, Midwest Educational Systems Inc. (owner of Rapid City-based for-profit business school National College) agreed to manage the school. The deal was finalized on July 11, 1984, marking the end of the school's 100 years of Presbyterian affiliation. The new owner shifted the school's emphasis from liberal arts education to business. After three years of managing the school, Midwest Educational Systems exercised an option to buy the school for $1 and became the Higher Education Corporation of America.

In January 1989, the school was sold to Lansdowne University Ltd., a South Dakota corporation with ties to a college in London. The board of trustees of the school changed the name to Huron University, and soon opened a new branch: Huron University USA in London, which became an independent institution.

In February 1992, Eastern International Education Association, a Delaware-based corporation headed by a member of the Japanese House of Representatives, purchased the school and set up a branch campus in Tokyo. Businessman Chikara Higashi was assigned as president of the university and chairman of the board of trustees. Different management styles and a lack of understanding of the American education system caused problems for the school, and the North Central Association threatened to not renew the school's accreditation in 1996. Higashi resigned in July of that year and the school went up for sale once again.

In December 1996, the Huron and Sioux Falls campuses were sold for $3.5 million to for-profit Whitman Education Group, Inc., then owners of Colorado Technical University (CTU). The Sioux Falls campus currently remains a part of the CTU system. A group of local investors bought the Huron campus from Whitman Education Group in August 1999.

=== Tribal ownership ===
In April 2001, the university was purchased by Si Tanka College, a former community-college chartered by the Cheyenne River Sioux Tribe of the Cheyenne River Indian Reservation. Si Tanka College, named after the Teton Sioux chief of the same name, already had a campus in Eagle Butte, and both campuses became the two-campus Si Tanka University. The Huron campus became Si Tanka University-Huron, the first off-reservation university controlled by a Native American tribe.

The Tribe financed the deal with $6.6 million in loans and guarantees from the U.S. Department of Agriculture. The federal government grants required at least 50% Native American enrollment, and Si Tanka could not meet that threshold with its new, primarily white Huron campus. Financial issues and allegations of improper spending by the university board of directors surfaced by the end of 2001. The situation was further complicated by a scandal in April 2002, when a freshman basketball player at Si Tanka was arrested and eventually pleaded guilty to intentionally exposing another student to the AIDS virus. The case received national media coverage and student enrollment the following fall declined by 53 students to 475.

The property fell into foreclosure in 2004 after the Tribe defaulted on $6.6 million worth of loans and faced a $2 million federal tax lien. On February 26, 2006, the Higher Learning Commission of the NCA voted to revoke the school's accreditation, effective on August 7, 2006, because the school's trustees had voted to cease operation as a university in the previous January. By March 2005, teachers and staff had not been paid since mid-February and gave the administration a vote of no confidence, walking out and effectively ending classes at the end of March.

=== Closure ===
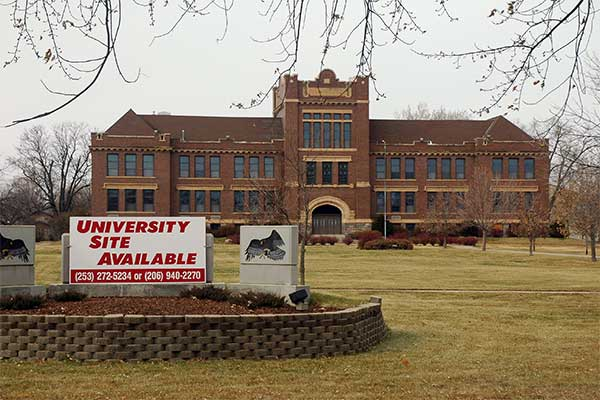
Voorhees Hall at the former Huron College, photographed November 10, 2006 as the campus awaits a potential buyer.

The Huron campus officially closed on April 1, 2005. On April 9, Si Tanka filed for Chapter 11 bankruptcy protection. By April 25, the U.S. Department of Education alerted the school that it was no longer permitted to take part in federal grants and that its students were no longer eligible for federal student loans. On April 30, an unofficial graduation ceremony was held for the school's final seniors. Northern State University, a public university in Aberdeen, took control of the school's transcripts.

In February 2006, the Chapter 11 case was dismissed when a federal judge found there were not enough remaining assets for unsecured creditors. On May 5, 2006, the campus and all its assets were placed onto the auction block, including 23 acres (93,000 m^{2}) with classrooms, campus center, dorms, library and gym — along with bleachers, band uniforms, bookcases and basketball banners. Two empty lots, including the football field, were sold immediately.

In 2008, the Huron School District bought the university arena. The Fine Arts Center is now owned by the City of Huron and is a community Fine Arts Center.

In 2011, the City of Huron voted to tear down the campus to make room for Central Park, which was to include a park and new swimming pool complex. Demolition was started on September 19, 2011. Construction was due to start in early 2012, and the park opened in 2013. As of 2021 all but a few buildings on the old campus was demolished: McDougal Residence Hall (1953), originally a women's dorm, was sold and converted into the Huron Area Senior Center in 1978; the city renovated and kept the Campus Center (1970) & Fine Arts Center (1973).

== Notable alumni ==
- Nikko Briteramos, basketball player
- Garney Henley, Canadian Football Hall of Fame player
- Muriel Humphrey, wife of Vice President Hubert Humphrey; served briefly as U.S. Senator from Minnesota
- Gladys Pyle, South Dakota secretary of state and interim U.S. senator
- Lynn Schneider, member of the South Dakota House of Representatives
- Harvey L. Wollman, lieutenant governor and governor of South Dakota

== Sources ==
- Auction ushers end to college, Aberdeen American News, May 5, 2006. Accessed May 5, 2006.
- Associated Press, Timeline of significant events in history of former Huron University, Aberdeen American News, May 5, 2006. Accessed May 5, 2006.
- Roger Larsen, City wants court to decide if it owns Fine Arts Center free of all mortgages, liens and encumbrances, Huron Plainsman. Accessed May 5, 2006.
