= Riverside Colony, South Dakota =

- Census-designated place
- Location within South Dakota Location within the United States
- Coordinates: 44°28′56″N 98°08′12″W
- Country: United States
- State: South Dakota
- County: Beadle

Area
  - Total: 0.78 sq mi (2.02 km^{2})
  - Land: 0.77 sq mi (1.99 km^{2})
  - Water: 0.012 sq mi (0.03 km^{2})
- Elevation: 1,273 ft (388 m)

Population (2020)
  - Total: 72
  - Density: 93.6/sq mi (36.13/km^{2})
- Time zone: UTC-6 (Central (CST))
  - Summer (DST): UTC-5 (CDT)
- ZIP Code: 57350 (Huron)
- Area code: 605
- FIPS code: 46-55220
- GNIS feature ID: 2812996

Riverside Colony is a Hutterite colony and census-designated place (CDP) in Beadle County, South Dakota, United States. It was first listed as a CDP prior to the 2020 census. The population of the CDP was 72 at the 2020 census.

It is in northeastern Beadle County, on the west side of the James River. It is 12 miles (19 km) north-northeast of Huron, the county seat.

== Demographics ==
Historical population
Census	Pop.	Note	%±
2020	72		—
U.S. Decennial Census

== Education ==
It is in the Huron School District.
