= Yale, South Dakota =

- Town
- Location in Beadle County and the state of South Dakota
- Coordinates: 44°26′02″N 97°59′19″W
- Country: United States
- State: South Dakota
- County: Beadle
- Incorporated: 1925

Area
  - Total: 0.15 sq mi (0.39 km^{2})
  - Land: 0.15 sq mi (0.38 km^{2})
  - Water: 0.0039 sq mi (0.01 km^{2})
- Elevation: 1,339 ft (408 m)

Population (2020)
  - Total: 112
  - Density: 771.3/sq mi (297.79/km^{2})
- Time zone: UTC-6 (Central (CST))
  - Summer (DST): UTC-5 (CDT)
- ZIP code: 57386
- Area code: 605
- FIPS code: 46-73020
- GNIS feature ID: 1267664

Yale is an incorporated town in Beadle County, South Dakota, United States. The population was 112 at the 2020 census.

== History ==
Yale was founded in the late 1880s, and named after Yale University.

== Geography ==
According to the United States Census Bureau, the town has a total area of 0.15 square miles (0.39 km^{2}), all land.

== Demographics ==
Historical population
Census	Pop.	Note	%±
1930	190		—
1940	156		−17.9%
1950	164		5.1%
1960	171		4.3%
1970	148		−13.5%
1980	136		−8.1%
1990	128		−5.9%
2000	118		−7.8%
2010	108		−8.5%
2020	112		3.7%
U.S. Decennial Census

=== 2010 census ===
As of the census of 2010, there were 108 people, 50 households, and 30 families residing in the town. The population density was 720.0 inhabitants per square mile (278.0/km^{2}). There were 56 housing units at an average density of 373.3 per square mile (144.1/km^{2}). The racial makeup of the town was 95.4% White, 0.9% African American, and 3.7% from two or more races.

There were 50 households, of which 26.0% had children under the age of 18 living with them, 46.0% were married couples living together, 8.0% had a female householder with no husband present, 6.0% had a male householder with no wife present, and 40.0% were non-families. 32.0% of all households were made up of individuals, and 18% had someone living alone who was 65 years of age or older. The average household size was 2.16 and the average family size was 2.77.

The median age in the town was 44 years. 22.2% of residents were under the age of 18; 7.4% were between the ages of 18 and 24; 20.4% were from 25 to 44; 36.2% were from 45 to 64; and 13.9% were 65 years of age or older. The gender makeup of the town was 51.9% male and 48.1% female.

=== 2000 census ===
As of the census of 2000, there were 118 people, 47 households, and 33 families residing in the town. The population density was 749.8 inhabitants per square mile (289.5/km^{2}). There were 55 housing units at an average density of 349.5 per square mile (134.9/km^{2}). The racial makeup of the town was 100.00% White. There were 47 households, out of which 36.2% had children under the age of 18 living with them, 66.0% were married couples living together, and 27.7% were non-families. 25.5% of all households were made up of individuals, and 12.8% had someone living alone who was 65 years of age or older. The average household size was 2.51 and the average family size was 3.00.

In the town, the population was spread out, with 27.1% under the age of 18, 5.1% from 18 to 24, 32.2% from 25 to 44, 22.9% from 45 to 64, and 12.7% who were 65 years of age or older. The median age was 36 years. For every 100 females, there were 93.4 males. For every 100 females age 18 and over, there were 100.0 males.

The median income for a household in the town was $41,250, and the median income for a family was $49,167. Males had a median income of $28,125 versus $15,625 for females. The per capita income for the town was $13,118. There were no families and 4.2% of the population living below the poverty line, including no under eighteens and 15.4% of those over 64.
