= Argus Leader =

Newspaper published in South Dakota

- The October 22, 2012, front page of the Argus Leader, after the death of George McGovern
- Type: Daily newspaper
- Format: Broadsheet
- Owner: Lee Enterprises
- Founder: William A. Fulmer
- Founded: 1881 (as the Sioux Falls Argus)
- Language: English
- Headquarters: 710 N Western Ave; Sioux Falls, South Dakota 57104
- Circulation: 7,000 Digital Subscribers; 26,720 Daily; 44,550 Sunday (as of 2015)
- Website: argusleader.com

The Argus Leader is the daily newspaper of Sioux Falls, South Dakota. It is the largest newspaper by total circulation in South Dakota.

== History ==
On August 2, 1881, William A. Fulmer relocated the Hamburg Democrat from Iowa to South Dakota and relaunched it as the weekly Sioux Falls Argus. That November, Fulmer died at age 29. In February 1882, T.S. Goddard bought the paper, and then sold it that December to W.S. Wynn.

On March 4, 1885, the Argus expanded from a weekly to a daily. In November 1885, Goddard's sons, Walter W. and Paul R., bought the paper from Wynn. In 1886, Charles M. Day was hired at the Argus. In 1887, the Goddard brothers acquired the Sioux Falls Leader from Robert Buchanan and consolidated with the Argus to form the Argus Leader. In 1888, Day succeeded W.W. Goddard as editor.

Day published the paper until his death in 1945. He was succeeded by his son Dr. Herbert J. Day. In 1951, a fire caused $150,000 worth of damage to the paper's printing plant. In 1954, H.J. Day died. His sister Mrs. Dorothy Day Davenport then took over the Argus Leader and in 1955 sold it to John A. Kennedy Under the name Kraco Enterprises he expanded his media holdings in 1961, acquiring KRGV-TV. In 1963, Speidel Newspapers bought the Argus Leader, and in 1976 the company agreed to merge with Gannett.

In 2021, the paper's print production plant in Sioux Falls printing plant ceased and production operations were consolidated with other Gannett-owned newspapers in Des Moines, Iowa. In March 2022, the Argus Leader moved to a six day printing schedule, eliminating its printed Saturday edition. That same year, the Argus Leader sold its office building to local investors.

In November 2023, the newspaper announced it was moving its newsroom at 200 S. Minnesota Avenue in downtown Sioux Falls after nearly 70 years occupying the same space. The team of seven to 10 reporters will join the rest of its distribution team at 710 N. Western Avenue. In November 2025, Gannett was renamed to USA Today Co. In September 2026, the Argus Leader was acquired by Lee Enterprises.

== Readership ==
The Argus Leader is South Dakota's largest newspaper in total circulation as of 2023. The weekday circulation for the newspaper was 23,721 as of October 2017. The Sunday edition has a circulation of 32,981 as of October 2017.

Its website boasts the most traffic and unique visitors in its market, according to Comscore data. The company claimed to have over 786,000 unique users visit the site every month in 2018.

The company estimates that it informs and engages 75% of adults in Sioux Falls MSA in a typical week and 84% over a month across its print and digital brands.

== Notable Reporting ==
In 2011, the newspaper sought information about the federal food stamps program through a Freedom of Information Act request. The request was denied, and eight years later, the United States Supreme Court ruled in favor of the government by a 6–3 decision.

The newspaper reported that the FBI had 'mined secrets about the past' of 1972 presidential candidate George McGovern in more than 1,400 files requested by a Freedom of Information Act.

== See also ==
- List of newspapers in South Dakota
