= Carpenter, South Dakota =

- Town
- Location within the state of South Dakota Carpenter (the United States)
- Coordinates: 44°38′17″N 97°54′54″W
- Country: United States
- State: South Dakota
- County: Clark
- Time zone: UTC-6 (Central (CST))
  - Summer (DST): UTC-5 (CDT)
- ZIP codes: 57322
- Area code: 605

Carpenter is a town in Clark County, South Dakota, United States. Located 14 miles (23 km) west of Willow Lake on the GNR, it was founded in 1899, and had an estimated population of 85 in 1921.

It was named by its first postmaster John C. Opsahl for his recently deceased friend, G. W. Carpenter, a land office agent in nearby Watertown.

It had a lumberyard, the Carpenter Lumber Company, whose building stood for many years in the mid-20th-century before being finally demolished in the 1990s. It had a general store, C. W. Chambers General Merchandise. It also had (in 1921) three churches, Methodist, Lutheran, and Congregational; a bank; a hotel; and a feed mill. In the 1970s, the Farmers Union Oil Company ran a fertilizer plant there.

Celebrated residents at the turn of the 20th century included Canton Hobit, who reportedly weighed 512 pounds (232 kg) and had to slide off his buggy with the use of a board. One Dr Leach, the local physician who had moved there in 1907, drove its first automobile there in 1909.
