= Beadle County, South Dakota =

County in South Dakota, United States

- County
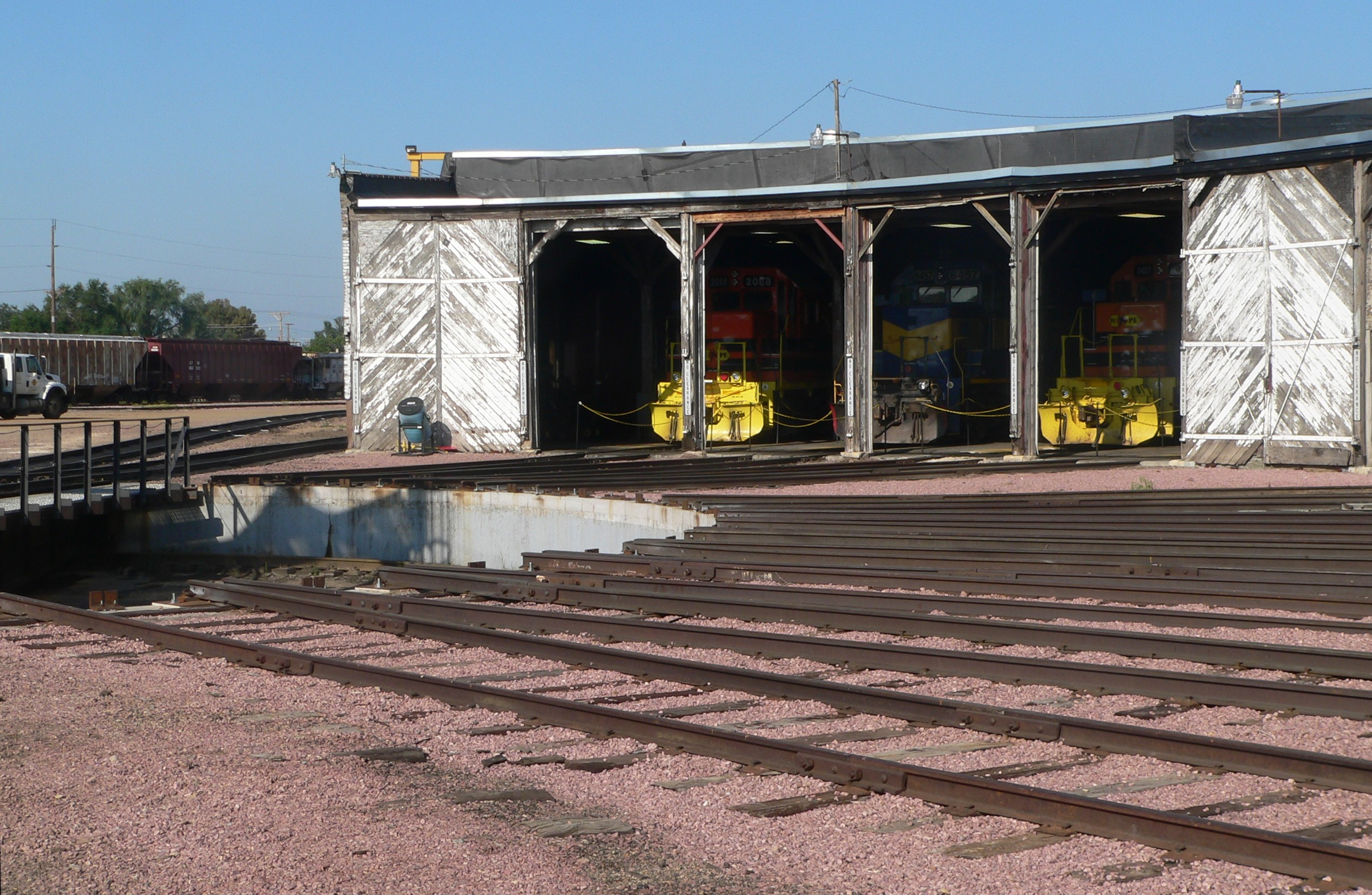
- Chicago and Northwestern roundhouse in Huron, South Dakota.

- Location within the U.S. state of South Dakota
- Coordinates: 44°25′N 98°17′W
- Country: United States
- State: South Dakota
- Created: 1879
- Organized: 1880
- Named for: William Henry Harrison Beadle
- Seat: Huron
- Largest city: Huron

Area
  - Total: 1,265 sq mi (3,280 km^{2})
  - Land: 1,259 sq mi (3,260 km^{2})
  - Water: 6.1 sq mi (16 km^{2}) 0.5%

Population (2020)
  - Total: 19,149
  - Estimate (2025): 19,624 ▲
  - Density: 15.6/sq mi (6.0/km^{2})
- Time zone: UTC−6 (Central)
  - Summer (DST): UTC−5 (CDT)
- Congressional district: At-large
- Website: www.beadlesd.org

Beadle County is a county in the U.S. state of South Dakota. As of the 2020 census, the population was 19,149, making it the 11th most populous county in South Dakota. Its county seat is Huron. The county was created in 1879 and organized in 1880. Beadle County comprises the Huron, SD Micropolitan Statistical Area.

== History ==
Beadle County, named for Brigadier General William Henry Harrison Beadle, was created by the Dakota Territory Legislature in 1879, and was organized in 1880 with the appointment of three county commissioners by Governor Nehemiah G. Ordway. The first town within Beadle County was Cavour, but Huron was named the county seat when the county commissioners first met there in July 1880.

== Geography ==
The James River flows south-southeastward through the eastern central part of Beadle County. The terrain of Beadle County consists of low rolling hills, sloping toward the river valley. The county's highest point is its SW corner, at 1,841 ft (561 m) ASL. Its lowest point is on the south boundary line, where James River flows into adjacent Sanborn County, at 1,230 ft (370 m) ASL.

The county has a total area of 1,265 square miles (3,280 km^{2}), of which 1,259 square miles (3,260 km^{2}) is land and 6.1 square miles (16 km^{2}) (0.5%) is water.

=== Major highways ===
- U.S. Highway 14
- U.S. Highway 281
- South Dakota Highway 28
- South Dakota Highway 37

=== Adjacent counties ===
- Spink County – north
- Clark County – northeast
- Kingsbury County – east
- Sanborn County – southeast
- Jerauld County – southwest
- Hand County – west

=== Protected areas ===
- Bob Roe Memorial State Game Production Area
- Brecken Slough State Game Production Area
- Cavour Lake State Game Production Area
- James River School State game Production Area
- Lake Byron Hogsback State Game Production Area
- Mallard Slough State Game Production Area
- Mud Lake State Game Production Area
- North Byron State Game Production Area
- Norwegian/Borden State Game Production Area
- Pheasant Country State Game Production Area
- Sand Creek State Game Production Area
- South Byron State Game Production Area
- South James River State Game Production Area
- Staum Dam State Game Production Area
- Third Street Dam State Game Production Area
- Upper Cain Creek State Game Production Area

== Demographics ==
Historical population
| Census | Pop. | Note | %± |
|---|---|---|---|
| 1880 | 1,290 | | — |
| 1890 | 9,586 | | 643.1% |
| 1900 | 8,081 | | −15.7% |
| 1910 | 15,776 | | 95.2% |
| 1920 | 19,273 | | 22.2% |
| 1930 | 22,917 | | 18.9% |
| 1940 | 19,648 | | −14.3% |
| 1950 | 21,082 | | 7.3% |
| 1960 | 21,682 | | 2.8% |
| 1970 | 20,877 | | −3.7% |
| 1980 | 19,195 | | −8.1% |
| 1990 | 18,253 | | −4.9% |
| 2000 | 17,023 | | −6.7% |
| 2010 | 17,398 | | 2.2% |
| 2020 | 19,149 | | 10.1% |
| 2025 (est.) | 19,624 | ▲ | 2.5% |
U.S. Decennial Census

=== 2020 census ===
As of the 2020 census, there were 19,149 people, 7,369 households, and 4,623 families residing in the county. Of the residents, 27.2% were under the age of 18 and 17.8% were 65 years of age or older; the median age was 36.2 years. For every 100 females there were 100.7 males, and for every 100 females age 18 and over there were 100.6 males.

The population density was 15.2 inhabitants per square mile (5.9/km^{2}).

The racial makeup of the county was 72.4% White, 0.9% Black or African American, 1.7% American Indian and Alaska Native, 10.8% Asian, 7.0% from some other race, and 6.9% from two or more races. Hispanic or Latino residents of any race comprised 14.3% of the population.

Of the 7,369 households, 31.3% had children under the age of 18 living with them and 23.6% had a female householder with no spouse or partner present. About 32.1% of all households were made up of individuals and 14.2% had someone living alone who was 65 years of age or older.

There were 8,396 housing units, of which 12.2% were vacant. Among occupied housing units, 65.7% were owner-occupied and 34.3% were renter-occupied. The homeowner vacancy rate was 1.8% and the rental vacancy rate was 13.8%.

=== 2010 census ===
As of the 2010 census, there were 17,398 people, 7,276 households, and 4,509 families residing in the county. The population density was 13.8 inhabitants per square mile (5.3/km^{2}). There were 8,304 housing units at an average density of 6.6 per square mile (2.5/km^{2}). The racial makeup of the county was 89.7% white, 3.6% Asian, 1.1% American Indian, 0.8% black or African American, 0.1% Pacific islander, 3.0% from other races, and 1.6% from two or more races. Those of Hispanic or Latino origin made up 7.7% of the population. In terms of ancestry, 45.4% were German, 11.7% were Norwegian, 10.3% were Irish, 8.8% were English, and 4.1% were American.

Of the 7,276 households, 28.6% had children under the age of 18 living with them, 49.5% were married couples living together, 8.3% had a female householder with no husband present, 38.0% were non-families, and 33.0% of all households were made up of individuals. The average household size was 2.31 and the average family size was 2.92. The median age was 41.2 years.

The median income for a household in the county was $40,716 and the median income for a family was $56,288. Males had a median income of $37,020 versus $25,824 for females. The per capita income for the county was $23,409. About 6.3% of families and 13.1% of the population were below the poverty line, including 12.8% of those under age 18 and 12.5% of those age 65 or over.

== Communities ==
=== Cities ===
- Huron (county seat)
- Iroquois (partial)
- Wessington (partial)

=== Towns ===
- Broadland
- Cavour
- Hitchcock
- Virgil
- Wolsey
- Yale

=== Census-designated places ===
- Huron Colony
- Morningside
- Pearl Creek Colony
- Riverside Colony
- Shamrock Colony

=== Townships ===
- Allen
- Altoona
- Banner
- Barrett
- Belle Prairie
- Bonilla
- Broadland
- Burr Oak
- Carlyle
- Cavour
- Clifton
- Clyde
- Custer
- Dearborn
- Fairfield
- Foster
- Grant
- Hartland
- Huron
- Iowa
- Kellogg
- Lake Byron
- Liberty
- Logan
- Milford
- Nance
- Pearl Creek
- Pleasant View
- Richland
- Sand Creek
- Theresa
- Valley
- Vernon
- Wessington
- Whiteside
- Wolsey

== Politics ==
Beadle County has become more Republican in recent history. In 2000, George W. Bush won the county, ending a streak of Democratic-majority voting that began in 1992.

United States presidential election results for Beadle County, South Dakota
| Year | Republican | | Democratic | | Third party(ies) | |
| Year | No. | % | No. | % | No. | % |
|---|---|---|---|---|---|---|
| 1892 | 984 | 52.85% | 206 | 11.06% | 672 | 36.09% |
| 1896 | 935 | 49.89% | 915 | 48.83% | 24 | 1.28% |
| 1900 | 1,220 | 55.56% | 915 | 41.67% | 61 | 2.78% |
| 1904 | 1,818 | 73.78% | 493 | 20.01% | 153 | 6.21% |
| 1908 | 1,776 | 58.50% | 1,105 | 36.40% | 155 | 5.11% |
| 1912 | 0 | 0.00% | 1,464 | 45.85% | 1,729 | 54.15% |
| 1916 | 1,662 | 45.72% | 1,828 | 50.29% | 145 | 3.99% |
| 1920 | 2,852 | 56.54% | 925 | 18.34% | 1,267 | 25.12% |
| 1924 | 3,466 | 53.37% | 851 | 13.10% | 2,177 | 33.52% |
| 1928 | 5,094 | 61.43% | 3,168 | 38.20% | 31 | 0.37% |
| 1932 | 2,995 | 32.05% | 6,246 | 66.83% | 105 | 1.12% |
| 1936 | 2,965 | 32.90% | 5,843 | 64.84% | 203 | 2.25% |
| 1940 | 4,356 | 45.33% | 5,253 | 54.67% | 0 | 0.00% |
| 1944 | 3,610 | 48.44% | 3,842 | 51.56% | 0 | 0.00% |
| 1948 | 3,662 | 45.15% | 4,372 | 53.90% | 77 | 0.95% |
| 1952 | 6,487 | 65.33% | 3,443 | 34.67% | 0 | 0.00% |
| 1956 | 5,216 | 53.06% | 4,614 | 46.94% | 0 | 0.00% |
| 1960 | 5,911 | 59.17% | 4,079 | 40.83% | 0 | 0.00% |
| 1964 | 4,051 | 40.43% | 5,968 | 59.57% | 0 | 0.00% |
| 1968 | 4,214 | 42.66% | 5,357 | 54.23% | 307 | 3.11% |
| 1972 | 5,922 | 57.81% | 4,297 | 41.95% | 25 | 0.24% |
| 1976 | 4,758 | 49.22% | 4,846 | 50.13% | 62 | 0.64% |
| 1980 | 5,921 | 58.60% | 3,521 | 34.85% | 662 | 6.55% |
| 1984 | 5,876 | 62.36% | 3,523 | 37.39% | 23 | 0.24% |
| 1988 | 4,611 | 50.23% | 4,523 | 49.27% | 46 | 0.50% |
| 1992 | 3,363 | 36.81% | 3,925 | 42.96% | 1,848 | 20.23% |
| 1996 | 3,670 | 42.77% | 3,984 | 46.43% | 927 | 10.80% |
| 2000 | 4,347 | 56.17% | 3,216 | 41.56% | 176 | 2.27% |
| 2004 | 4,917 | 57.98% | 3,443 | 40.60% | 120 | 1.42% |
| 2008 | 4,054 | 52.55% | 3,493 | 45.28% | 167 | 2.16% |
| 2012 | 4,230 | 58.24% | 2,881 | 39.67% | 152 | 2.09% |
| 2016 | 4,455 | 65.79% | 1,912 | 28.23% | 405 | 5.98% |
| 2020 | 4,808 | 67.90% | 2,107 | 29.76% | 166 | 2.34% |
| 2024 | 4,826 | 68.84% | 2,017 | 28.77% | 167 | 2.38% |

== Education ==
School districts include:

- Doland School District 56-2
- Hitchcock-Tulare School District 56-6
- Huron School District
- Iroquois School District 02-3
- Miller Area School District 29-4
- Wessington Springs School District 36-2
- Willow Lake School District 12-3
- Wolsey-Wessington School District 02-6

== See also ==
- National Register of Historic Places listings in Beadle County, South Dakota
- The Old Timers by J. L. Carr

== Bibliography ==
- J.L. Carr (1957) The Old Timers. A social history of the way of life of the home-steading pioneers in the Prairie States during the first few years of settlement, as shown by a typical community, the 'old-timers' of Beadle County in South Dakota. Huron, South Dakota: privately printed.
