= List of United States political families (G) =

The following is an alphabetical list of political families in the United States whose last name begins with G.

== The Gabbards ==
- Mike Gabbard (1948–present), Hawaii State Senator 2006–present, Member of the Honolulu City Council 2002–2004. Father of Tulsi Gabbard.
  - Tulsi Gabbard (1981–present), Hawaii State Representative 2002–2004, Member of the Honolulu City Council 2011–2012, U.S. Representative from Hawaii 2013–2021, 25th Director of National Intelligence 2025–2026. Daughter of Mike Gabbard.

== The Gadsdens ==
- Christopher Gadsden (1723–1805), Delegate to the Continental Congress from South Carolina 1774–76, Lieutenant Governor of South Carolina 1778–80. Grandfather of John Gadsden and James Gadsden.
  - John Gadsden (1787–1831), South Carolina State Representative 1819, U.S. Attorney of South Carolina 1820–31, Intendant of Charleston, South Carolina 1827–29. Grandson of Christopher Gadsden.
  - James Gadsden (1788–1858), member of the Florida Territorial Legislature, U.S. Minister to Mexico 1853–56. Grandson of Christopher Gadsden.
    - Philip H. Gadsden (1867–1965), delegate to the Democratic National Convention 1916. Grandnephew of John Gadsen and James Gadsden.

== The Gaetzs ==
- Jerry Gaetz (1914–1964), Mayor of Rugby, North Dakota 1958–64, North Dakota State Senator. Father of Don Gaetz.
  - Don Gaetz (1948–present), Florida State Senator 2006-2016, 2024-present; Florida Senate President 2014-2016. Son of Jerry Gaetz. Father of Matt Gaetz
    - Matt Gaetz (1982–present), Florida State Representative 2010-2016, U.S. Representative from Florida 2017–2024. Son of Don Gaetz.

== The Gaines ==
- Ted Gaines (born 1958), Member of the California State Assembly 2006–11, Member of the California Senate 2011–19, Member of the California State Board of Equalization 2019–present.
- Beth Gaines (born 1959), Member of the California State Assembly 2011–16. Wife of Ted Gaines.

== The Gales ==
- George Gale (1756–1815), U.S. Representative from Maryland 1789–91. Father of Levin Gale.
  - Levin Gale (1784–1834), Maryland State Senator 1816, U.S. Representative from Maryland 1827–29. Son of George Gale.

== The Gallatins, Nicholsons, and Davies ==
- Albert Gallatin (1761–1849), delegate to the Pennsylvania Constitutional Convention 1790, Pennsylvania State Representative 1790–92, U.S. Senator from Pennsylvania 1793–94, U.S. Representative from Pennsylvania 1795–1801, U.S. Secretary of the Treasury 1801–14, U.S. Minister to France 1815–23, U.S. Minister to Great Britain 1826–27. Cousin by marriage of Joseph Hopper Nicholson.
- Joseph Hopper Nicholson (1770–1817), Maryland House Delegate 1796–98, U.S. Representative from Maryland 1799–1806, Judge of the Maryland Court of Appeals 1806–17. Cousin by marriage of Albert Gallatin.
  - Eugenie Mary Ladenburg Davie (1895–1975), delegate to the Republican National Convention 1936. Great-great-granddaughter of Albert Gallatin.

NOTE: Joseph Hopper Nicholson was also brother-in-law of U.S. Attorney Francis Scott Key. Eugenie Mary Ladenburg Davie was also a descendant by marriage of North Carolina Governor William Richardson Davie and granddaughter-in-law of U.S. Representative William Preston.

== The Gallegos ==
- Ruben Gallego (born 1979), Arizona State Representative 2011–14, U.S. Representative from Arizona 2015–present.
- Kate Gallego (born 1981), Member of the Phoenix City Council 2014–18, Mayor of Phoenix 2019–present. Former wife of Ruben Gallego.

== The Gallups and Sumners ==
- David Gallup (1808–1882), delegate to the Republican National Convention 1860, Connecticut State Senator 1869, Lieutenant Governor of Connecticut 1879–81. Father-in-law of David Gallup.
  - George G. Sumner (1841–1906), Connecticut State Representative 1867, Mayor of Hartford, Connecticut 1878–80; Lieutenant Governor of Connecticut 1878–80; Connecticut State Senator 1887–88. Son-in-law of David Gallup.

== The Gambles ==
- John Rankin Gamble (1848–1891), District Attorney of Yankton County, Dakota Territory 1876–78; U.S. Attorney of the Dakota Territory 1878; Dakota Territory Representative 1877–79; Dakota Territory Councilman 1881–85; U.S. Representative from South Dakota 1891. Brother of Robert J. Gamble.
- Robert J. Gamble (1851–1924), District Attorney in Dakota Territory 1880, Attorney of Yankton, Dakota Territory 1881–82; U.S. Representative from South Dakota 1895–97 1899–1901; U.S. Senator from South Dakota 1901–13. Brother of John Rankin Gamble.
  - Ralph A. Gamble (1885–1959), New York Assemblyman 1931–37, U.S. Representative from New York 1937–57. Son of Robert J. Gamble.

== The Ganos ==
- John Gano (1727–1804), chaplain for the Continental Army and selected by George Washington to deliver the prayer marking the official end to the American Revolutionary War
- Stephan Gano (1762–1828), son of John Gano, became a chaplain and surgeon's mate during the American Revolution
- Richard M. Gano (1775–1815), general in the War of 1812
- John Gano Price (1797–1867), grandson of John Gano, served as a Missouri State Senator in 1844 and again in 1848
- William Hubbel Price (1820–1895), son of John G. Price (1797–1867) and great grandson of John Gano. He served in the Missouri State Guard during the Civil War. He later moved to Texas and was elected to the Texas Legislature.
- Richard Montgomery Gano (1830–1913), Tarrant County Representative to the Texas Legislature 1860–62, Brigadier general of the Confederate States of America 1865
- Stephan Gano Burbridge (1831–1894), prominent Union General during the Civil War
- William Price Sanders (1833–1863), Union Brigadier-General during the Civil War.
- William Beriah Gano (1854–1913), son of Richard Montgomery Gano (1830-1913), worked as a lawyer and judge in Texas. He was also the grandfather of billionaire Howard Hughes (1905–1976)
- Francis Gano Benedict (1870–1957), renowned chemist and physiologist who developed the calorimeter and spirometer.
- Roy Alexander "Red" Gano (1902-1971), Vice-Admiral in the United States Navy.

== The Garcias ==
- Jorge Luis Garcia (1953–2010), member of the Arizona Senate for District 27.
  - Maria Garcia, member of the Arizona Senate for District 27. Wife of Jorge Luis Garcia.

== The Garcelons ==
- Alonzo Garcelon (1813–1906), delegate to the Republican National Convention 1856, candidate for U.S. Representative from Maine 1868, Mayor of Lewiston, Maine 1871–72; Governor of Maine 1879–80. Father of Alonzo Marston Garcelon.
  - Alonzo Marston Garcelon, Mayor of Lewiston, Maine 1883–84. Son of Alonzo Garcelon.

== The Gardiners ==
- Robert H. Gardiner, Mayor of Gardiner, Maine 1850. Great-great-grandfather of William Tudor Gardiner.
  - William Tudor Gardiner (1892–1953), Maine State Representative 1921–26, Governor of Maine 1929–33, delegate to the Republican National Convention 1932. Great-great-grandson of Robert H. Gardiner.
  - Margaret Gardiner, delegate to the Republican National Convention 1936. Wife of William Tudor Gardiner.

== The Gardners and Hoeys ==
- Oliver Max Gardner (1882–1947), chairman of the Cleveland County, North Carolina Democratic Party 1907–08; North Carolina Democratic Executive Committeeman 1910–14; North Carolina State Senator 1911 1915; Lieutenant Governor of North Carolina 1917–21; candidate for Governor of North Carolina 1920 delegate to the Democratic National Convention 1924 1932 1940 1944; Governor of North Carolina 1929–33. Husband of Fay Webb Gardner.
- Fay Webb-Gardner, Second Lady of North Carolina 1917–1921, First Lady of North Carolina 1929–1933, North Carolina Committeewoman 1929, North Carolina Democratic Executive Committeewoman 1930–32, delegate to the Democratic National Convention 1948 1952. Wife of Oliver Max Gardner.
- Clyde R. Hoey (1877–1954), North Carolina State Representative 1899–1902, North Carolina State Senator 1903–06, U.S. Representative from North Carolina 1919–21, Governor of North Carolina 1937–41, delegate to the Democratic National Convention 1940 1944 1948 1952, Democratic National Committeeman 1941–44, U.S. Senator from North Carolina 1945–54. Brother-in-law of Oliver Max Gardner.
- Margaret Gardner Hoey (1875–1942), First Lady of North Carolina 1937–1941. Sister of Oliver Max Gardner and wife of Clyde R. Hoey.

== The Garfields ==
- James A. Garfield (1831–1881), U.S. Representative from Ohio 1863–81, President of the United States; 1881. Father of Harry A. Garfield and James A. Garfield.
  - Harry A. Garfield (1863–1942), U.S. Fuel Administrator 1917–19. Son of James A. Garfield.
  - James R. Garfield (1865–1950), Ohio State Senator 1896–99, member of the United States Civil Service Commission 1902–03, Commissioner of Corporations of the Department of Commerce and Labor 1903–07, Secretary of the Interior 1907–09, Progressive Party nominee for Governor of Ohio, 1914. Son of James A. Garfield.

John Phillip Garfield (born 1949), Oakland County Commissioner (Michigan) 1993–2002. Michigan State Representative (Republican) (2003–08) Michigan State Senate candidate (2010) 4th great cousin to President James A. Garfield. Born: Detroit, Michigan

== The Garlands ==
- Rufus King Garland Jr. (1830–1886), member of the Arkansas Legislature, 1858–61, Confederate States Representative from Arkansas 1864–65, delegate to the Arkansas Constitutional Convention 1874, candidate for Governor of Arkansas 1882. Brother of Augustus H. Garland.
- Augustus H. Garland (1832–1899), Confederate States Representative from Arkansas 1862–64, Confederate States Senator from Arkansas 1864–65, Governor of Arkansas 1874–77, U.S. Senator from Arkansas 1877–85, Attorney General of the United States 1885–89. Brother of Rufus King Garland Jr.

== The Garrards ==
- James Garrard (1749–1822), second Governor of Kentucky, 1796–1804; member, Virginia House of Delegates, 1779; Democratic-Republican; eponym, Garrard County, Kentucky.
  - William Garrard (1771–1838), member Kentucky State Legislature, 1793, 1796–1800, 1822.
  - James Garrard (1773–1838) member, Kentucky State Senate, 1813–17; member Kentucky House of Representatives 1808, 1820, 1831.
  - Daniel Garrard (1780–1866) member Kentucky Senate 1813, 1817,1825,1829; member, Kentucky House of Representatives, 1822
    - James H. Garrard (1810–1865), Kentucky State Treasurer, 1857–65; member, Kentucky State Legislature, 1836; member, Second Constitutional Convention of the United States
    - Theophilus T. Garrard (1813–1902), member, Kentucky House of Representatives.
  - Margaret Garrard (1788–1815), wife of United States Senator Isham Talbot

== The Garretts ==
- John W. Garrett (1872–1942), U.S. Minister to Venezuela 1910–11; U.S. Minister to Argentina 1911–13; U.S. Minister to the Netherlands 1917–19; U.S. Minister to Luxembourg 1917–19; delegate to the Republican National Conventions of 1920 and 1924; U.S. Ambassador to Italy 1929–33. Brother of Robert Garrett.
- Robert Garrett, candidate for member of Maryland House of Delegates, 1903 and 1905; candidate for U.S. Representative from Maryland, 1904, 1906, and 1908; Maryland Republican Committeeman 1912. Brother of John W. Garrett.

== The Garrisons ==
- Lindley M. Garrison (1864–1932), U.S. Secretary of War 1913–16. Brother of Charles G. Garrison.
- Charles G. Garrison, Justice of the New Jersey Supreme Court 1888–93 1896–1900. Brother of Lindley M. Garrison.

== The Gartrells and Randells ==
- Lucius Jeremiah Gartrell (1821–1891), Solicitor General in Georgia, Georgia State Representative 1847–50, U.S. Representative from Georgia 1857–61, Confederate States Representative from Georgia 1862–64, delegate to the Georgia Constitutional Convention 1877. Uncle of Choice B. Randell.
  - Choice B. Randell (1857–1945), U.S. Representative from Texas 1901–13, candidate for U.S. Senate from Texas 1912. Nephew of Lucius Jeremiah Gartrell.

== The Gasques ==
- Allard H. Gasque (1873–1938), U.S. Representative from South Carolina 1923–38.
- Elizabeth Hawley Gasque (1886–1989), U.S. Representative from South Carolina 1938–39. Wife of Allard H. Gasque.

== The Gastons ==
- William Gaston (1820–1894), Massachusetts State Representative 1853–56, Massachusetts State Senator 1868, Mayor of Boston, Massachusetts 1871–72; candidate for Governor of Massachusetts 1873 1877; Governor of Massachusetts 1875–76. Father of William A. Gaston.
  - William A. Gaston (1859–1927), candidate for Governor of Massachusetts 1902 1903 1926, candidate for U.S. Senate from Massachusetts 1922. Son of William Gaston.
    - William Gaston, candidate for U.S. Representative from Connecticut 1948. Son of William A. Gaston.

== The Gates ==
- Ralph F. Gates (1893–1978), delegate to the Republican National Convention 1928 1936 1948, chairman of the Indiana Republican Party 1941–44, Governor of Indiana 1945–49, Republican National Committeeman 1946–50. Father of Robert E. Gates.
  - Robert E. Gates (1920–1994), candidate for Republican nomination for Governor of Indiana 1964. Son of Ralph F. Gates.
    - Kenneth N. Giffin (born 1944), Indianapolis, Indiana Councilman 1972–96. Grandson-in-law of Ralph F. Gates.

== The Gays ==
- Edward James Gay (1816–1889), U.S. Representative from Louisiana 1885–89. Grandfather of Edward James Gay.
  - Edward James Gay (1878–1952), Louisiana State Representative 1904–18, U.S. Senator from Louisiana 1918–21. Grandson of Edward James Gay.

== The Geddes ==
- James Geddes (1763–1838), U.S. Representative from New York 1819–21. Father of George Geddes.
  - George Geddes (1809–1883), New York State Senator 1847–51. Son of James Geddes.

== The Gehrmanns ==
- Bernard J. Gehrmann (1880–1958), chairman of the board of Mellen, Wisconsin 1921–32; Wisconsin State Assemblyman 1927–33 1947–54; delegate to the Republican National Convention 1932; Wisconsin State Senator 1933–34 1955–57; U.S. Representative from Wisconsin 1935–43. Father of Bernard E. Gehrmann.
  - Bernard E. Gehrmann (1920–2006), Ashland, Wisconsin Councilman; member of the Ashland County, Wisconsin Board of Supervisors; Wisconsin State Assemblyman 1965–68. Son of Bernard J. Gehrmann.

== The Georges of Oregon ==
- Gary George, member of the Oregon State Senate 1997–2009
  - Larry George (born 1968), member of the Oregon State Senate 2007–15

== The Georges and Leavells ==
- James Z. George (1826–1897), U.S. Senator from Mississippi 1881–97. Father-in-law of William Hayne Leavell.
  - William Hayne Leavell (1850–1930), U.S. Minister to Guatemala 1913–18. Son-in-law of James Z. George.

== The Gephardts and Talents ==
- Richard A. Gephardt (born 1941), U.S. Representative from Missouri 1977–2005, candidate for the Democratic nomination for President of the United States 1988 2004, delegate to the Democratic National Convention 2000 2004 2008. Relative of James M. Talent.
- James M. Talent (born 1956), Missouri State Representative 1985–92, U.S. Representative from Missouri 1993–2001, candidate for Governor of Missouri 2000, U.S. Senator from Missouri 2002–07, delegate to the Republican National Convention 2004. Relative of Richard A. Gephardt.

== The Gerens ==
- Charlie Geren (born 1949), Republican member of the Texas House of Representatives from his native Fort Worth, Texas, since 2001; businessman, brother of Pete Geren
- Pete Geren (born 1952), Democratic member of the United States House of Representatives from Texas's 12th congressional district, 1989 to 1997; United States Secretary of the Army, 2007 to 2009, brother of Charlie Geren

== The Gerrys ==
- Elbridge Gerry (1744–1814), Massachusetts Colony 1772–75, Delegate to the Continental Congress from Massachusetts 1776–80 1783–85, U.S. Representative from Massachusetts 1789–93, candidate for Governor of Massachusetts 1800 1801 1802 1803, Governor of Massachusetts 1810–12, Vice President of the United States 1813–14. Grandfather of Elbridge Gerry.
  - Elbridge Gerry (1813–1886), U.S. Representative from Maine 1849–51. Grandson of Elbridge Gerry.
    - Peter G. Gerry (1879–1957), U.S. Representative from Rhode Island 1913–15, U.S. Senator from Rhode Island 1917–29 1935–47. Great-grandson of Elbridge Gerry.

== The Gholsons ==
- Thomas Gholson Jr. (1780–1816), member of the Virginia Legislature 1806, U.S. Representative from Virginia 1808 1809–16. Uncle of James Herbert Gholson and Thomas Saunders Gholson.
  - James Herbert Gholson (1798–1848), member of the Virginia Legislature 1824, U.S. Representative from Virginia 1833–35. Nephew of Thomas Gholson Jr.
  - Thomas Saunders Gholson (1808–1868), Virginia State Court Judge 1859–63, Confederate States Representative from Virginia 1864–65. Nephew and son-in-law of Thomas Gholson Jr.
  - Richard D. Gholson (1802–1861), Kentucky State Senator 1851–55, Governor of Washington Territory 1859–61. Relative of Thomas Gholson Jr.

== The Gibbses ==
- W. Benjamin Gibbs (1889–1940), U.S. Representative from Georgia 1939–40.
- Florence Reville Gibbs (1890–1964), U.S. Representative from Georgia 1940–41. Wife of W. Benjamin Gibbs.

== The Gibbons ==
- Julia Smith Gibbons (born 1950), Judge of the United States District Court for the Western District of Tennessee 1983–2002, Judge of the United States Court of Appeals for the Sixth Circuit 2002–present.
- Bill Gibbons, candidate for Governor of Tennessee 2010. Husband of Julia Smith Gibbons.

== The Gibbons and Rasmusons and von Imhofs ==
- Elmer E. Rasmuson (1909–2000), Mayor of Anchorage, Alaska 1964–67, candidate for U.S. Senate from Alaska 1968. Father of Lile Gibbons and grandfather of Natasha von Imhof.
  - Lile Gibbons, Connecticut State Representative. Daughter of Elmer E. Rasmuson.
    - Natasha von Imhof (1970–), member of the Anchorage School Board 2012–2015, Alaska state senator 2017–present. Granddaughter of Elmer E. Rasmuson.

== The Gibsons ==
- Ernest Willard Gibson (1872–1940), Vermont House of Representatives, 1906, Vermont State Senate, Windham County State's Attorney, 1919–21, U.S. Representative from Vermont 1923–33, U.S. Senator from Vermont 1933–40. Father of Ernest W. Gibson Jr. and Preston F. Gibson.
  - Ernest W. Gibson Jr. (1901–1969), U.S. Senator from Vermont 1940–41, Governor of Vermont 1947–50, Judge of U.S. District Court of Vermont 1950–69. Son of Ernest Willard Gibson.
    - Ernest W. Gibson III (1927–2020), son of Ernest W. Gibson Jr., Justice of the Vermont Supreme Court, Windham County State’s Attorney, Vermont House of Representatives.
    - Robert H. Gibson (1931–1999), son of Ernest W. Gibson Jr., Assistant Secretary of the Vermont Senate from 1963 to 1967, secretary from 1967 to 1999.
    - David A. Gibson (1936–2010), son of Ernest W. Gibson Jr., Vermont State Senate, 1977 to 1983, Senate Secretary from 2000 to 2010.
  - Preston F. Gibson (1908–1955), son of Ernest Willard Gibson, Judge of the Brattleboro municipal court.

== The Gibsons of Maryland and Tennessee ==
- Henry R. Gibson (1837–1938), delegate to the Tennessee Constitutional Convention 1870, Tennessee State Senator 1871–75, Tennessee State Representative 1875–77, Post Office Inspector of Knoxville, Tennessee; U.S. Pension Agent of Knoxville, Tennessee 1883–85; U.S. Representative from Tennessee 1895–1905; delegate to the Republican National Convention 1900. Cousin of Charles H. Gibson.
- Charles H. Gibson (1842–1900), Attorney of Talbot County, Maryland 1871–75; U.S. Representative from Maryland 1885–91; U.S. Senator from Maryland 1891–97. Cousin of Henry R. Gibson.

== The Gibsons of Pennsylvania ==
- John Gibson (1740–1822), delegate to the Pennsylvania Constitutional Convention 1790, Secretary of Indiana Territory 1800–16, acting Governor of Indiana Territory 1812–13. Uncle of John B. Gibson.
  - John B. Gibson (1780–1853), Pennsylvania State Representative 1810–12, Justice of the Pennsylvania Supreme Court 1816–27 1851–53, Chief Justice of the Pennsylvania Supreme Court 1827–51. Nephew of John Gibson.

== The Giddings and Julians ==
- Joshua Reed Giddings (1795–1864), Ohio State Representative 1826–28, U.S. Representative from Ohio 1838–59. Father-in-law of George Washington Julian.
  - George Washington Julian (1817–1899), Indiana State Representative, delegate to the Free Soil Party National Convention 1848, U.S. Representative from Indiana 1849–51 1861–71, candidate for Vice President of the United States 1852. Son-in-law of Joshua Reed Giddings.

== The Gilberts ==
- George G. Gilbert (1849–1909), Prosecuting Attorney of Spencer County, Kentucky 1876–80; Kentucky State Senator 1885–89; delegate to the Democratic National Convention 1896; U.S. Representative from Kentucky 1899–1907. Father of Ralph Waldo Emerson Gilbert.
  - Ralph Waldo Emerson Gilbert (1882–1939), Judge of the Shelby County, Kentucky Court 1910–17; U.S. Representative from Kentucky 1921–29 1931–33; Kentucky State Representative 1929 1933; Kentucky State Senator 1936. Son of George G. Gilbert.

== The Gilchrists ==
- William E. Gilchrist, Florida State Senator. Father of Albert W. Gilchrist.
  - Albert W. Gilchrist (1858–1926), Florida State Representative 1893–96 1903–06, Governor of Florida 1909–13, delegate to the Democratic National Convention 1912, candidate for the Democratic nomination for U.S. Senate from Florida 1916. Son of William E. Gilchrist.

== The Gills ==
- Oscar S. Gill (1880–1947), Mayor of Anchorage, Alaska 1932–33 1934–36; Alaska Territory Representative 1945–47. Father of Victor Gill.
  - Victor Gill, candidate for Mayor of Anchorage, Alaska 1936. Son of Oscar S. Gill.

== The Gills of Washington and Wisconsin ==
- Charles R. Gill (1830–1883), Wisconsin State Senator 1860–61, Attorney General of Wisconsin 1866–70. Father of Hiram Gill.
  - Hiram Gill (1866–1919), Mayor of Seattle, Washington 1910–11 1914–18. Son of Charles R. Gill.

== The Gillettes ==
- Francis Gillette (1807–1879), Connecticut State Representative 1832 1836 1838, U.S. Senator from Connecticut 1854–55. Father of Edward H. Gillette.
  - Edward H. Gillette (1840–1918), chairman of the Greenback Party National Committee, delegate to the Greenback Party National Convention 1876, U.S. Representative from Iowa 1879–81. Son of Francis Gillette.

NOTE: Edward H. Gillette was also a distant relative of U.S. President William Howard Taft.

== The Gilligans and the Sebeliuses ==
- John J. Gilligan (1921-2013), U.S. Representative, 1965–67; governor of Ohio, 1971–75.
- Keith Sebelius (1916–1982), U.S. Representative from Kansas, 1969–81.
  - Kathleen Sebelius (born 1949), Kansas insurance commissioner, 1995–2003; Governor of Kansas, 2003–09; Secretary of Health and Human Services, 2009–2014; daughter of John Gilligan and daughter-in-law of Keith Sebelius.
  - Gary Sebelius son of Keith Sebelius magistrate judge of the United States District Court for the District of Kansas (2003–present )

== The Gilmans ==
- Nathaniel Folsom (1726–1790), Delegate to the Continental Congress from New Hampshire 1774 1777–80, New Hampshire Governor's Councilman 1776–77 1783–84, Common Pleas Court Judge in New Hampshire 1776–90, delegate to the New Hampshire Constitutional Convention 1783. Third cousin and father-in-law of John Taylor Gilman.
  - John Taylor Gilman (1753–1828), New Hampshire State Representative 1779 1781 1810–11, Delegate to the Continental Congress from New Hampshire 1782–83, treasurer of New Hampshire 1791, Governor of New Hampshire 1794–1805 1813–16. Third cousin and son-in-law of Nathaniel Folsom.
  - Nicholas Gilman (1755–1814), Delegate to the Continental Congress from New Hampshire 1787–89, U.S. Representative from New Hampshire 1789–97, U.S. Senator from New Hampshire 1805–14. Brother of John Taylor Gilman.
    - Charles J. Gilman (1824–1901), New Hampshire State Representative 1851–52, Maine State Representative 1854–55, Maine Whig Party Committeeman, U.S. Representative from Maine 1857–59, delegate to the Republican National Convention 1860. Grandnephew of John Taylor Gilman and Nicholas Gilman.

== The Gilmores ==
- John Gilmore (1780–1845), Pennsylvania State Representative 1816–21, U.S. Representative from Pennsylvania 1829–33, Treasurer of Pennsylvania 1841–42. Father of Alfred Gilmore.
  - Alfred Gilmore (1812–1858), U.S. Representative from Pennsylvania 1849–53. Son of John Gilmore.

== The Gingrichs ==
- Newt Gingrich (born 1943), Member of the U.S. House of Representatives January 3, 1979 – January 3, 1999, House Minority Whip March 20, 1989 – January 3, 1995, Speaker of the U.S. House of Representatives January 4, 1995 – January 3, 1999
- Callista Gingrich (born 1966), United States Ambassador to the Holy See December 22, 2017 – 2021. Ambassador to Switzerland and Liechtenstein Wife of Newt Gingrich.

== The Glass ==
- Robert H. Glass (1820–1896), delegate to the Democratic National Convention 1860. Father of Carter Glass.
  - Carter Glass (1858–1946), Virginia State Senator 1899–1902, delegate to the Virginia Constitutional Convention 1901 1902, U.S. Representative from Virginia 1902–18, delegate to the Democratic National Convention 1916 1920 1924 1928 1932 1940 1944, Democratic National Committeeman 1916–28, U.S. Secretary of the Treasury 1918–20, U.S. Senator from Virginia 1920–46, candidate for the Democratic nomination for President of the United States 1920. Son of Robert H. Glass.

== The Gleasons ==
- Richard D. Gleason (1896–1937), member of the Massachusetts House of Representatives (1923–1925, 1929–1931) and Boston City Council (1930–1937). Brother of John Gleason and Mildred Harris.
- John L. Gleason (1903–1936), member of the Massachusetts House of Representatives (1935–1936). Brother of Richard Gleason and Mildred Harris.
- Mildred M. Harris (died 1974), member of the Boston City Council (1937–1940). Sister of Richard and John Gleason.

== The Glenns ==
- Luther Glenn (1818–1886), Georgia legislator, Mayor of Atlanta, Georgia 1858–60. Father of John Thomas Glenn.
  - John Thomas Glenn (1844–1899), Mayor of Atlanta, Georgia 1889–91. Son of Luther Glenn.

== The Glicks and Orrs ==
- George W. Glick (1827–1911), Kansas State Representative 1864, candidate for Governor of Kansas 1868 Kansas State Senator 1873, Kansas State Court Judge 1877, Governor of Kansas 1883–85. Father-in-law of J.W. Orr.
  - J.W. Orr, Kansas Democratic Central Committeeman 1884–1908, Mayor of Atchison, Kansas 1901–07; Kansas State Representative 1911–13; delegate to the Democratic National Convention 1924. Son-in-law of George W. Glick.

== The Glovers ==
- John Montgomery Glover (1822–1891), Collector of Internal Revenue in Missouri 1866–67, U.S. Representative from Missouri 1873–79. Uncle of John Milton Glover.
  - John Milton Glover (1852–1929), U.S. Representative from Missouri 1885–89, candidate for Governor of Missouri 1888. Nephew of John Montgomery Glover.

== The Goddards ==
- Sam Goddard (1919–2006), chairman of the Arizona Democratic Party; Governor of Arizona, 1965–67. Father of Terry Goddard
  - Terry Goddard (born 1947), Mayor of Phoenix, Arizona, 1984–90; Arizona Attorney General, 2003–2011. Son of Sam Goddard.

== The Goebels ==
- William Goebel (1856–1900), Kentucky State Senator 1887–99, delegate to the Kentucky Constitutional Convention 1890 1891, Governor of Kentucky 1900. Brother of Justus Goebel.
- Justus Goebel, delegate to the Democratic National Convention 1912. Brother of William Goebel.

== The Goffs ==
- Nathan Goff, Sr., West Virginia House Delegate 1863 1865 1870. Father of Nathan Goff Jr.
  - Nathan Goff Jr. (1843–1920), West Virginia House Delegate 1867–68, U.S. Attorney for West Virginia 1868–81 1881–82, candidate for U.S. Representative from West Virginia 1870 1874, delegate to the Republican National Convention 1872 1876 1880, candidate for Governor of West Virginia 1876 1888, U.S. Secretary of the Navy 1881, U.S. Representative from West Virginia 1883–89, U.S. Circuit Judge for West Virginia 1892–1913, U.S. Senator from West Virginia 1913–19. Son of Nathan Goff Jr.
    - Guy D. Goff (1866–1933), U.S. District Attorney for Wisconsin 1911–15, general counsel to the United States Shipping Board 1920, U.S. Senator from West Virginia 1925–31. Son of Nathan Goff Jr.
      - Louise Goff Reece (1898–1970), delegate to the Republican National Convention 1960 1964, U.S. Representative from Tennessee 1861–63, Republican National Committeewoman 1967. Daughter of Guy D. Goff.
      - B. Carroll Reece (1889–1961), U.S. Representative from Tennessee 1921–29 1933–47 1951–61, delegate to the Republican National Convention 1928 1932 1936 1940 1948, Republican National Committeeman 1939–40, chairman of the Republican National Committee 1946–48, candidate for U.S. Senate from Tennessee 1948, chairman of the Tennessee Republican Party 1958. Husband of Louise Goff Reece.

== The Goldsboroughs ==
- Robert Goldsborough (1733–1788), Sheriff of Dorchester County, Maryland 1761–65; Maryland Assemblyman; Attorney General of Maryland; Delegate to the Continental Congress from Maryland 1774–76; Maryland State Senator 1777. Father of Robert H. Goldsborough.
  - Robert H. Goldsborough (1779–1836), U.S. Senator from Maryland 1813–19 1835–36, Maryland House Delegate 1825. Son of Robert Goldsborough.
    - Charles Goldsborough (1765–1834), Maryland State Senator 1791–95 1799–1801, U.S. Representative from Maryland 1805–17, Governor of Maryland 1819. Grandson of Robert Goldsborough.
      - Winder Laird Henry (1864–1940), U.S. Representative from Maryland 1894–95, Chief Judicial Circuit Court Judge in Maryland 1908–09. Great-grandson of Charles Goldsborough.
      - Thomas Alan Goldsborough (1877–1951), Prosecuting Attorney of Caroline County, Maryland 1904–08; U.S. Representative from Maryland 1921–39; U.S. District Court Judge of District of Columbia 1939–51. Great-grandson of Charles Goldsborough.

NOTE: William Laird Henry was also son of U.S. Representative Daniel Maynadier Henry.

== The Goldthwaites, Pettits, and Siebels ==
- George Thomas Goldthwaite (1809–1879), Judge of the Alabama Circuit Court 1843–52, Justice of the Alabama Supreme Court 1852–56, U.S. Senator from Alabama 1871–77. Great-grandfather of George G. Seibels Jr..
  - William Pettit, Mayor of Norfolk, Virginia. Grandfather of George G. Seibels Jr.
    - George G. Siebels Jr. (1913–2000), candidate for Alabama State Representative 1962, Mayor of Birmingham, Alabama 1967–75; delegate to the Republican National Convention 1972; Alabama State Representative 1979–92. Grandson of William Pettit.

== The Goldwaters ==
- Michael Goldwater (1821–1903), Mayor of Prescott, Arizona 1885. Father of Morris Goldwater.
  - Morris Goldwater (1852–1939), Mayor of Prescott, Arizona 1879; Arizona Territory Councilman; delegate to the Arizona Constitutional Convention 1910; member of the Arizona Senate. Son of Michael Goldwater.
    - Barry Goldwater (1909–1998), Phoenix, Arizona Councilman; U.S. Senator from Arizona 1953–65 1969–87; candidate for President of the United States 1964. Grandson of Michael Goldwater.
      - Barry Goldwater Jr. (born 1938), U.S. Representative from California 1969–83, candidate for Republican nomination for U.S. Senate from California 1982. Son of Barry Goldwater.
      - Donald H. Goldwater (born 1955), chairman for the Arizona Republican Party, candidate for Republican nomination for Arizona State Senate 1992, delegate to the Republican National Convention 2004, candidate for Republican nomination for Governor of Arizona 2006. Nephew of Barry Goldwater.

== The Gonzalezes ==
- Henry B. Gonzalez (1916–2000), San Antonio, Texas Councilman 1953–56; Texas State Senator 1956–61; U.S. Representative from Texas 1961–99. Father of Charles A. Gonzalez.
  - Charles A. Gonzalez (born 1945), U.S. Representative from Texas 1999–2013. Son of Henry B. Gonzalez.

== The Goodells ==
- Charles Goodell (1926–1987) United States Senator from New York 1968–71, Congressman in New York's 43rd District 1959–63, Congressmen from New York's 38th District 1963–68, Congressional liaison assistant to Department of Justice 1954–55, vice-chairman of President Gerald Ford's committee to draft rules for granting amnesty to Vietnam War-era draft evaders and deserters, lobbyist for DGA International, father of Roger Goodell, Tim Goodell and Bill Goodell.
  - Roger Goodell (born 1959), Commissioner of the National Football League 2006–present, son of Charles Goodell, brother of Tim Goodell and Bill Goodell.
  - Bill Goodell, chief operating officer of Maverick Capital, chairman of lobbying firm Managed Funds Association 2012–13, co-chair of Environment Defense Action Fund, lobbyist for Environmental Defense Fund, brother of Roger and Tim Goodell, son of Charles Goodell.
  - Tim Goodell, senior vice president and general counsel of Hess, brother of Roger and Bill Goodell, son of Charles Goodell.
    - Andy Goodell (born 1954), member of New York State Assembly 2011–present, County Executive of Chautauqua County, New York 1990–97, cousin of Roger, Bill and Tim Goodell.

== The Goodenows ==
- Rufus K. Goodenow (1790–1863), Clerk of Oxford County, Maine Courts 1821–37; Maine State Representative 1837–38; delegate to the Whig National Convention 1839; U.S. Representative from Maine 1849–51. Brother of Robert Goodenow.
- Robert Goodenow (1800–1874), attorney of Franklin County, Maine 1828–34 1869–70; U.S. Representative from Maine 1851–53; treasurer of Franklin County, Maine 1866–68. Brother of Rufus K. Goodenow.

== The Goodenows and Holmes ==
- John Holmes (1773–1843), member of the Massachusetts General Court 1802 1803 1812, Massachusetts State Senator, U.S. Representative from Massachusetts 1817–20, U.S. Senator from Maine 1820–27 1829–33, Maine State Representative 1836–37, U.S. Attorney of Maine 1841–43. Father-in-law of Daniel Goodenow.
  - Daniel Goodenow, candidate for Governor of Maine 1831 1832 1833, Attorney General of Maine 1838 1841, Justice of the Maine Supreme Court 1855–62. Son-in-law of John Holmes.
    - John H. Goodenow, Maine State Representative 1859, Maine State Senator 1861–62, U.S. Consul General in Constantinople, Ottoman Empire 1864–65 1874. Son of Daniel Goodenow.

== The Goodlands ==
- John Goodland, Sr. (1831–1919), District Attorney of Outagamie County, Wisconsin 1888–91. Judge of the 10th Judicial District, starting in 1891. Father of:
- Walter Samuel Goodland (1862–1947), Mayor of Racine, Wisconsin 1911–15; delegate to the Republican National Convention 1912 1928; Lieutenant Governor of Wisconsin 1939–45; Governor of Wisconsin 1943–47. Brother of John Goodland Jr.
- John Goodland Jr., Mayor of Appleton, Wisconsin 1930–44. Brother of Walter Samuel Goodland.

== The Goodlings ==
- George A. Goodling (1896–1982), Pennsylvania State Representative 1943–57, U.S. Representative from Pennsylvania 1961–65 1967–75. Father of William F. Goodling.
  - William F. Goodling (1927-2017), president of the Dallastown, Pennsylvania School Board 1964–67; U.S. Representative from Pennsylvania 1975–2001; delegate to the Republican National Convention 2000. Son of George A. Goodling.

== The Goodriches ==
- Chauncey Goodrich (1759–1815), Connecticut State Representative 1793–94, U.S. Representative from Connecticut 1795–1801, U.S. Senator from Connecticut 1807–13, Mayor of Hartford, Connecticut 1912–15; Lieutenant Governor of Connecticut 1913–15. Brother of Elizur Goodrich.
- Elizur Goodrich (1761–1849), Connecticut State Representative 1795–1802, U.S. Representative from Connecticut 1799–1801, Collector of Customs for the port of New Haven, Connecticut; Mayor of New Haven, Connecticut 1803–22. Brother of Chauncey Goodrich.

== The Goodwins ==
- Joseph Robert Goodwin (born 1942), City Attorney of Ripley, West Virginia 1971–72; Municipal Judge of Ripley, West Virginia 1972–73; U.S. District Court Judge in West Virginia 1995–present. Uncle of Carte Goodwin and father of Booth Goodwin.
  - Carte Goodwin (born 1974), U.S. Senator from West Virginia 2010. Nephew of Joseph Robert Goodwin.
  - Booth Goodwin (born 1971), U.S. Attorney in West Virginia. Son of Joseph Robert Goodwin.
  - Amy Shuler Goodwin (born 1971), Mayor of Charleston, West Virginia 2019–present. Wife of Booth Goodwin.

Note: Amy Shuler Goodwin's grandmother, Thais Blatnik, served in both chambers of the West Virginia Legislature from 1977–1978, and again from 1980–1996.

== The Gordons and Haralsons ==
- Hugh A. Haralson (1805–1854), U.S. Representative from Georgia 1843–51. Father-in-law of James Brown Gordon.
  - John Brown Gordon (1832–1904), candidate for Governor of Georgia 1868, U.S. Senator from Georgia 1873–80 1891–97, Governor of Georgia 1886–90. Son-in-law of Hugh A. Haralson.

== The Gordons and Paines ==
- George Gordon (1836–1911), U.S. Representative from Tennessee 1907–11. Uncle by marriage of Rowlett Paine.
  - Rowlett Paine, Mayor of Memphis, Tennessee 1920–27. Nephew by marriage of George Gordon.

== The Gordons and Waynes ==
- James M. Wayne (1790–1867), Georgia State Representative 1815–16, Mayor of Savannah, Georgia 1817–19; Common Pleas Court Judge in Savannah, Georgia 1820–22; Superior Court Judge in Savannah, Georgia 1822–28; U.S. Representative from Georgia 1829–35; Justice of the U.S. Supreme Court 1835–67. Uncle by marriage of William Washington Gordon.
  - William Washington Gordon (1796–1842), Mayor of Savannah, Georgia 1834–36; Georgia State Representative 1835; Georgia State Senator 1838. Nephew by marriage of James M. Wayne.
    - W.W. Gordon (1834–1912), Georgia State Representative 1884–90. Son of William Washington Gordon.

== The Gores ==
- Albert A. Gore Sr. (1907–1998), U.S. Representative from Tennessee, 1939–44 and 1945–53; U.S. Senator from Tennessee, 1953–71.
  - Albert A. Gore Jr. (born 1948), U.S. Representative from Tennessee, 1977–85; U.S. Senator from Tennessee, 1985–93; candidate for Democratic nomination for president, 1988;, vice president, 1993–2001; Democratic nominee for president, 2000; Nobel Peace Prize winner 2007; son of Albert Gore Sr.
  - Louise Gore, state senator and gubernatorial candidate in Maryland and U.S. Ambassador to UNESCO, was a second cousin of Al Gore Jr.
    - Deborah Gore Dean, former HUD official convicted in a kickback scandal, is a niece of Louise Gore.

Note: Writer Gore Vidal asserted that his grandfather, Thomas Pryor Gore, who served as U.S. senator from Oklahoma, was related to the Gores of Tennessee, but no such relationship has been proven.

== The Gormans and Johnsons ==
- Arthur Pue Gorman (1839–1906), Maryland House Delegate 1870–72, Maryland State Senator 1876–82, U.S. Senator from Maryland 1881–99 1903–06. Father-in-law of Richard A. Johnson.
  - Richard A. Johnson, candidate for U.S. Representative from Maryland 1914. Son-in-law of Arthur Poe Gorman.

== The Gorskis ==
- Chester C. Gorski (1906–1975), member of the Erie County, New York Board of Supervisors 1941–45; Buffalo, New York Common Councilman 1946–48 1954–56 1960–74; U.S. Representative from New York 1949–51. Father of Dennis Gorski and Jerome Gorski.
  - Dennis Gorski, New York Assemblyman 1975–83, Erie County, New York Executive 1988–99; candidate for U.S. Representative from New York 1992. Son of Chester C. Gorski.
  - Jerome Gorski, Justice of the New York Supreme Court. Son of Chester C. Gorski.

== The Gorsuchs and Burfords ==
- Anne Gorsuch Burford (1942–2004), Colorado State Representative 1976–80, Administrator of the Environmental Protection Agency 1981–83.
- Robert F. Burford (1924–1993), Colorado State Representative 1975–81, Speaker of the Colorado House of Representatives 1979–81, Director of the Bureau of Land Management 1981–89. Husband of Anne Gorsuch Burford.
  - Neil Gorsuch (born 1967), Principal Deputy Associate Attorney General, 2005–06, Judge of the United States Court of Appeals for the Tenth Circuit 2006–17, Associate Justice of the Supreme Court of the United States 2017–present. Son of Anne Gorsuch Burford.

== The Gosars ==
- Paul Gosar (born 1958), U.S. Representative from Arizona 2011–present. Brother of Pete Gosar.
- Pete Gosar (born 1967), candidate for the Democratic nomination for Governor of Wyoming 2010, Democratic nominee for Governor of Wyoming 2014. Brother of Paul Gosar.

== The Gortons ==
- Slade Gorton (1928–2020), Washington State legislator 1959–69, Attorney General of Washington 1969–81, U.S. Senator from Washington 1981–87 1989–2001.
- Nathaniel M. Gorton (born 1938), Judge of the United States District Court for the District of Massachusetts 1992–present. Brother of Slade Gorton.

== The Goulds and Judds ==
- Norman B. Judd (1815–1878), Illinois State Senator 1844–60, delegate to the Republican National Convention 1860, U.S. Minister to Prussia 1861–65, U.S. Representative from Illinois 1867–71. Grandfather of Norman J. Gould.
  - Norman J. Gould (1877–1964), delegate to the Republican National Convention 1908 1916, chairman of the Seneca County, New York Republican Committee 1912–23; U.S. Representative from New York 1915–23. Grandson of Norman B. Judd.

== The Grahams of Florida ==
- Ernest R. (Cap) Graham (1896–1957), Florida State Senator 1937–44, candidate for Democratic nomination for Governor of Florida 1944. Father of Daniel R. Graham.
  - Daniel R. (Bob) Graham (born 1936), Florida State Representative 1967–71; Florida State Senator 1970–78; Governor of Florida 1979–87; U.S. Senator from Florida 1987–2005; delegate to Democratic National Conventions of 2000, 2004, and 2008, candidate for 2004 Democratic nomination for President of the United States (withdrew). Son of Ernest R. Graham.
    - Gwen Graham (born 1963), U.S. Representative from Florida's second district 2015–2017; Assistant Secretary of Education for Legislation and Congressional Affairs, 2021-2025. Daughter of Bob Graham.

== The Grahams of North Carolina ==
- James Graham, U.S. Representative, North Carolina state legislator
- William Alexander Graham, brother of James Graham, Governor of North Carolina, United States Senator, United States Secretary of the Navy
  - William A. Graham, son of William Alexander Graham, state legislator and North Carolina Commissioner of Agriculture
  - John Washington Graham, son of William Alexander Graham, member of the North Carolina Senate
  - Augustus Washington Graham, son of William Alexander Graham, speaker of the North Carolina House of Representatives
  - Walter Clark, son-in-law of William Alexander Graham, chief justice of North Carolina Supreme Court
    - Alexander H. Graham, son of John Washington Graham, Speaker of the North Carolina House of Representatives, Lieutenant Governor of North Carolina

== The Grahams of South Carolina ==
- Lindsey Graham (1955 - 2026), South Carolina State Representative 1992-94, U.S. Representative from South Carolina 1995-2003, U.S. Senator from South Carolina 2003-26.
- Darline Graham (born 1964), Commissioner of the South Carolina Commission for the Blind 2019-26, U.S. Senator from South Carolina 2026-present. Sister of Lindsey Graham

== The Granades and Rives ==
- Richard Rives (1895–1982), Judge of the United States Court of Appeals for the Fifth Circuit 1951–66.
  - Callie V. Granade (born 1950), Judge of the United States District Court for the Southern District of Alabama 2002–16. Granddaughter of Richard Rives.

== The Granahans ==
- William T. Granahan (1895–1956), U.S. Representative from Pennsylvania 1945–47 1949–56.
- Kathryn E. Granahan (1894–1979), U.S. Representative from Pennsylvania 1956–63. Wife of William T. Granahan.

== The Grangers ==
- Gideon Granger (1767–1822), Connecticut Assemblyman, candidate for U.S. Representative from Connecticut 1798, U.S. Postmaster General 1801–14. Father of Francis Granger.
  - Francis Granger (1792–1868), New York Assemblyman 1826–28 1830–32, candidate for Lieutenant Governor of New York 1828, candidate for Governor of New York 1830 1832, candidate for Vice President of the United States 1836, U.S. Representative from New York 1835–41 1841–43, U.S. Postmaster General 1841. Son of Gideon Granger.
  - Amos P. Granger (1789–1866), U.S. Representative from New York 1855–59. Nephew of Gideon Granger.

== The Granholms and Mulherns ==
- Jennifer Granholm (born 1959), Attorney General of Michigan 1999–2003; Governor of Michigan 2003–11; United States Secretary of Energy 2021-present. Wife of Daniel G. Mulhern.
- Daniel G. Mulhern, delegate to the Democratic National Conventions of 2004 and 2008. Husband of Jennifer Granholm.
- Mary Mulhern, Tampa, Florida Councilwoman 2007–present. Sister of Daniel G. Mulhern.

== The Grants ==
- Ulysses S. Grant, eighteenth President of the United States
  - Frederick Dent Grant, U.S. Minister to Austria, New York City Police Commissioner, son of Ulysses S. Grant
    - Ulysses S. Grant III, U.S. Army general, member of the U.S. delegation to the Supreme War Council at Versailles, son of Frederick Dent Grant. He married Edith Root, daughter of Elihu Root.
  - Ulysses S. Grant Jr., Delegate to the Republican National Convention from California, Presidential elector for California, son of Ulysses Grant. He married Fannie Josephine Chaffee, daughter of Jerome Bunty Chaffee

NOTE: Ulysses S. Grant was also seventh cousin of U.S. President Millard Fillmore and sixth cousin once removed of U.S. President Grover Cleveland.

== The Grants and Murphys ==
- Edward Murphy Jr. (1836–1911), Mayor of Troy, New York 1875–83; delegate to the Democratic National Convention 1880 1884 1888 1892 1896 1904; chairman of the New York Democratic Party 1887–94; U.S. Senator from New York 1893–99. Father-in-law of Hugh J. Grant.
  - Hugh J. Grant (1857–1910), candidate for Mayor of New York City 1884 1894, Sheriff of New York County, New York 1886–88; Mayor of New York City 1889–92; delegate to the Democratic National Convention 1896. Son-in-law of Edward Murphy Jr.

== The Grassleys ==
- Chuck Grassley (born 1933), Iowa State Representative 1959–75, U.S. Representative from Iowa 1975–81, U.S. Senator from Iowa 1981–present.
  - Pat Grassley (born 1983), Iowa State Representative 2007–present, Speaker of the Iowa House of Representatives 2020–present. Grandson of Chuck Grassley.

== The Graves ==
- Samuel Graves (born 1963), U.S. Representative from Missouri 2001–present.
- Todd Graves, U.S. Attorney in Missouri 2001–06. Brother of Samuel Graves.

== The Grays ==
- William Gray (1750–1825), Massachusetts State Senator, Lieutenant Governor of Massachusetts 1810–12. Father of Frances Eally Gray.
  - Frances Eally Gray (1790–1856), Massachusetts State Representative. Son of William Gray.
    - Horace Gray (1828–1902), Justice of the Massachusetts Supreme Court 1864–73, Chief Justice of the Massachusetts Supreme Court 1873–81, Justice of the U.S. Supreme Court 1881–1902. Descendant of William Gray.

NOTE: Horace Gray was also son-in-law of U.S. Supreme Court Justice Stanley Matthews.

== The Greaves ==
- Stephen A. D. Greaves (1817–1880), Mississippi State Representative 1854. Father of Stephen, John, Clarence, and Harry Greaves.
  - Stephen A. D. Greaves Jr. (1854–1915), Mississippi State Representative 1908–1912
  - John M. Greaves (1860–1914), Mississippi State Representative 1912–1914. Father-in-law of John R. Anderson.
    - John R. Anderson (1882–1924), Mississippi State Representative 1920–1924. Married Elease Greaves, daughter of John M. Greaves
  - Clarence B. Greaves (1863–1940), Mississippi State Senator, 1896–1900 and 1912–1920, and Mississippi State Representative, 1904–1908. Married Elizabeth Baker, descendant of Mississippi Governor John J. Pettus.
  - Harry B. Greaves (1867–1944), Mississippi State Senator, 1902–1908, and Mississippi State Representative, 1894–1896.

== The Greeleys ==
- Horace Greeley (1811–1872), U.S. Representative from New York 1848–49, delegate to the Republican National Convention 1860, Republican National Committeeman 1866–70, delegate to the New York Constitutional Convention 1867, candidate for U.S. Representative from New York 1870, candidate for President of the United States 1872. Second cousin of Wallace M. Greeley.
  - Wallace M. Greeley, Mayor of Ames, Iowa 1888–90. Second cousin of Horace Greeley.
  - Horace W. Greeley, Maine State Representative 1919–20. Fifth cousin once removed of Horace Greeley.

== The Greeleys of Florida and Minnesota ==
- Martin Greeley (1814–1899), Minnesota State Representative 1872. Third cousin of Elam A.J. Greeley.
- Elam Greeley (1818–1882), Minnesota Territory Councilman 1852–53, Minnesota Territory Representative 1857. Third cousin of Martin Greeley.
  - J.C. Greeley, Florida State Representative 1862–63, Mayor of Jacksonville, Florida 1873–74; Florida State Senator 1883–86. First cousin once removed of Martin Greeley, third cousin once removed of Elam A.J. Greeley.
    - Otto E. Greeley, delegate to the Republican National Convention 1908. Grandnephew of Martin Greeley.

== The Greens ==
- William J. Green Jr. (1910–1963), U.S. Representative from Pennsylvania 1945–47 1949–63, delegate to the Democratic National Convention 1956. Father of William J. Green III.
  - William J. Green III (born 1938), U.S. Representative from Pennsylvania 1964–77, candidate for Democratic nomination for Mayor of Philadelphia, Pennsylvania 1971; candidate for U.S. Senate from Pennsylvania 1976; Mayor of Philadelphia, Pennsylvania 1980–84. Son of William J. Green Jr.

== The Greens of Massachusetts ==
- Addison L. Green (1862–1942), candidate for U.S. Representative from Massachusetts 1894. Father of Marshall Green.
  - Marshall Green (1916–1998), U.S. Consul General in Hong Kong, China 1961–63; U.S. Ambassador to Indonesia 1965–69; U.S. Ambassador to Australia 1973–75; U.S. Ambassador to Nauru 1974–75. Son of Addison L. Green.
  - Margaret A. Green, delegate to the Republican National Convention 1936 1944, Republican National Committeewoman 1936–37. Daughter-in-law of Addison L. Green.

NOTE: Marshall Green was also son-in-law of U.S. Ambassador Edward S. Crocker II.

== The Greens of Missouri (19th century) ==
- Martin E. Green (1815–1863), Judge in Lewis County, Missouri. Brother of James S. Green.
- James S. Green (1817–1870), delegate to the Missouri Constitutional Convention 1845, U.S. Representative from Missouri 1847–51, U.S. Chargé d'Affaires to Colombia 1853–54, U.S. Senator from Missouri 1857–61. Brother of Martin E. Green.

== The Greens of Missouri (21st century) ==
- Jason Green, Missouri state representative
- Lucas Green, Missouri state representative, brother.

== The Greens, Ransoms, and Whartons ==
- Jesse Wharton (1782–1833), U.S. Representative from Tennessee 1807–09, U.S. Senator from Tennessee 1814–15. Father-in-law of Thomas Jefferson Green.
  - Thomas Jefferson Green (1802–1863), North Carolina Assemblyman 1823, member of the Florida Legislature, Congressman of the Texas Republic, California State Senator 1850. Son-in-law of Jesse Wharton.
    - Wharton J. Green (1831–1910), delegate to the Democratic National Convention 1868 1872 1876 1888, U.S. Representative from North Carolina 1883–87. Son of Thomas Jefferson Green.
    - Matt Whitaker Ransom (1826–1904), Attorney General of North Carolina 1852–55, member of the North Carolina House of Commons 1858–61, U.S. Senator from North Carolina 1872–95, U.S. Minister to Mexico 1895–97. Cousin of Wharton J. Green.

== The Greenes ==
- William Greene, Governor of Rhode Island Colony. Father of William Greene.
  - William Greene (1731–1809), Governor of Rhode Island 1778–86. Son of William Greene.
    - Ray Greene (1765–1849), U.S. Senator from Rhode Island 1797–1801. Son of William Greene.

== The Greggs ==
- Hugh Gregg (1917–2003), Nashua, New Hampshire Alderman 1947–50; Mayor of Nashua, New Hampshire 1950; Governor of New Hampshire 1953–55. Father of Judd Gregg.
  - Judd Gregg (born 1947), U.S. Representative from New Hampshire 1981–89, Governor of New Hampshire 1989–93, U.S. Senator from New Hampshire 1993–2011. Son of Hugh Gregg.

== The Gregorys ==
- William Voris Gregory (1877–1936), Surveyor of Graves County, Kentucky 1902–10; Judge of Graves County, Kentucky 1913–19; U.S. Attorney in Kentucky 1919–23; U.S. Representative from Kentucky 1927–36. Brother of Noble Jones Gregory.
- Noble Jones Gregory (1897–1971), U.S. Representative from Kentucky 1937–58. Brother of William Voris Gregory.

== The Greshams and Penningtons ==
- Dennis Pennington (1776–1854), Indiana Territorial Legislature speaker 1810–16, Indiana State Senator 1816–20 1825–27 1830–33 1842–45, Indiana State Representative 1822–24 1828–30 1845–46.
  - Walter Q. Gresham (1832–1895), Judge of the United States District Court for the District of Indiana 1869–83, United States Postmaster General 1883–84, United States Secretary of the Treasury 1884, Judge of the United States Circuit Courts for the Seventh Circuit 1884–93 Judge of the United States Court of Appeals for the Seventh Circuit 1891–93, United States Secretary of State 1893–95. Grandnephew of Dennis Pennington.

== The Grew, Lyons, Moffats, and Bennetts ==
- Joseph Grew (1880–1965), U.S. Minister to Denmark 1920–21, U.S. Minister to Switzerland 1921–24, U.S. Under Secretary of State 1924–27 and 1944–45, U.S. Ambassador to Turkey 1927–32, U.S. Ambassador to Japan 1932–41. Father-in-law of Jay Pierrepont Moffat and Cecil B. Lyon.
  - Jay Pierrepont Moffat (1896–1943), U.S. Consul General in Sydney, Australia 1935–37; U.S. Minister to Canada 1940–43. Son-in-law of Joseph Grew.
  - Cecil B. Lyon (1903–1993), U.S. Vice Consul in Havana, Cuba 1931; U.S. Vice Consul in Hong Kong, China 1932; U.S. Consul in Tianjin, China 1938; U.S. Ambassador to Chile 1956–58; U.S. Ambassador to Ceylon 1964–67; U.S. Ambassador to the Maldive Islands 1968. Son-in-law of Joseph Grew.
    - Jay P. Moffat (born 1932), U.S. Ambassador to Chad 1983–85. Son of Jay Pierrepont Moffat.
    - William Tapley Bennett Jr. (1917–1994), U.S. Ambassador to the Dominican Republic 1964–66, U.S. Ambassador to Portugal 1966–69. Nephew by marriage of Jay Pierrepont Moffat.

NOTE: Jay Pierrepont Moffat was also great-grandnephew of New York City Mayor Seth Low, nephew of Connecticut State Representative Seth Low Pierrepont, brother of New York Assemblyman Abbot Low Moffat, and brother-in-law of U.S. Ambassador John Campbell White.

== The Griffins ==
- Robert P. Griffin (1923–2015), U.S. Representative from Michigan 1957–66, U.S. Senator from Michigan 1966–79, Justice of the Michigan Supreme Court 1987–94. Father of Richard Allen Griffin.
  - Richard Allen Griffin (born 1952), Judge of the Michigan Court of Appeals 1989–2005, candidate for Justice of the Michigan Supreme Court 1994, Judge of the U.S. Court of Appeals 2005–present. Son of Robert P. Griffin.

== The Griffins and Mercers ==
- Cyrus Griffin (1748–1810), Virginia House Delegate 1777–78 1786–87, Delegate to the Continental Congress from Virginia 1778–81 1787–88, U.S. District Court Judge in Virginia 1789–1810. Great-grandfather of George A. Mercer.
  - George A. Mercer (1835–1907), member of the Georgia legislature, delegate to the Democratic National Convention from Georgia 1892. Great-grandson of Cyrus Griffin.

== The Griffiths and Williams ==
- Vern D. Griffith (1915–1972), Mayor of Butte, Montana 1959–64. Father of Carol Williams.
  - Carol Williams (born 1943), Montana State Representative 1999–2000, Montana State Senator 2004–present. Daughter of Vern D. Griffith.
  - John Patrick Williams (born 1937), Montana State Representative 1967–69, U.S. Representative from Montana 1979–97. Husband of Carol Williams.

== The Grigsbys ==
- Melvin Grigsby (1845-1917). South Dakota Attorney General (1877–79); organizer and commander, 3rd United States Volunteer Cavalry Regiment (Grigsby’s Cowboys) (1898); brigadier, 1st Cavalry Brigade (1898–99).
  - Sioux K. Grigsby (1873-1968), South Dakota Lieutenant Governor (1945–49). Son of Melvin Grigsby.
  - George B. Grigsby (1874-1962), Attorney General of Alaska (1916-1919); Alaska Territorial Delegate to US House of Representatives (1920–21); Mayor, Nome, Alaska (1914); Delegate to Democratic National Convention (1920, 1924). Son of Melvin Grigsby.
  - John T. Grigsby (1890-1977), South Dakota Lieutenant Governor (1929–31). Son of Melvin Grigsby.
  - Jessie Dillabough "Jay" Grigsby (1888-1963). Delegate to Democratic National Convention (1952). Wife of George Grigsby.

== The Grijalvas ==
- Raúl Grijalva (1948–2025), member of the U.S. House of Representatives, January 3, 2003 – March 13, 2025.
  - Adelita Grijalva (born 1970), member of the U.S. House of Representatives from Arizona's 7th congressional district, 2025–present. Daughter of Raúl Grijalva.

== The Grinnells ==
- Joseph Grinnell (1788–1885), Massachusetts Governor's Councilman 1839–41, U.S. Representative from Massachusetts 1843–51. Brother of Moses H. Grinnell.
- Moses H. Grinnell (1803–1877), U.S. Representative from New York 1839–41, Collector of Port of New York City 1869–70. Brother of Joseph Grinnell.

== The Groesbecks ==
- Charles G. Groesbeck, Michigan State Representative 1863–64. Brother of Louis Groesbeck.
- Louis Groesbeck, Sheriff of Macomb County, Michigan 1879–80 1883–86. Brother of Charles G. Groesbeck.
  - Alexander J. Groesbeck (1873–1953), candidate for Republican nomination for Governor of Michigan 1914 1930 1934, Attorney General of Michigan 1917–20, Governor of Michigan 1921–26, delegate to the Republican National Convention 1924 1944. Son of Louis Groesbeck.

== The Grouts ==
- William W. Grout (1836–1902), Vermont State Representative 1868, delegate to the Republican National Convention 1868, Vermont State Senator 1876, U.S. Representative from Vermont 1881–83 1885–91. Brother of Josiah Grout.
- Josiah Grout (1841–1925), Vermont State Representative 1872–74, 1884–88, 1894, Vermont State Senator 1892, Governor of Vermont 1896–98. Brother of William W. Grout. Father of Aaron H. Grout.
  - Aaron H. Grout (1879-1966), Vermont House of Representatives (1922–23), Secretary of State of Vermont (1923–27), Judge of Burlington's Municipal Court (1933-1941). Son of Josiah Grout.
- Theophilus Grout (1848-1937), State's Attorney for Orleans County (1878–79), Vermont House of Representatives (1880–81). Brother of William W. and Josiah Grout.

== The Gubbruds and Rommeriams ==
- Andrew J. Rommeriam (1851–1926), South Dakota State Representative 1911–14. Grandfather of Archie M. Gubbrud.
  - Archie M. Gubbrud (1910–1987), South Dakota State Representative 1951–52, Governor of South Dakota 1961–65, candidate for U.S. Senate from South Dakota 1968. Grandson of Andrew J. Rommeriam.

== The Gudgers and Langleys ==
- Hezekiah A. Gudger (1849–1917), North Carolina State Representative 1873–76, North Carolina State Senator 1885, U.S. Consul General in Panama 1897–1905, Justice of the Panama Canal Zone Supreme Court 1904–09, Chief Justice of the Panama Canal Zone Supreme Court 1909–14. Brother of James M. Gudger Jr.
- James M. Gudger Jr. (1855–1920), North Carolina State Senator 1900, North Carolina Solicitor 1901–02, U.S. Representative from North Carolina 1903–07 1911–15. Brother of Hezekiah A. Gudger.
  - Katherine G. Langley (1888–1948), vice chairman of the Kentucky Republican Committee 1920–22, delegate to the Republican National Convention 1924, U.S. Representative from Kentucky 1927–31. Daughter of James M. Gudger Jr.
  - John W. Langley (1868–1932), Kentucky State Representative 1886–90, U.S. Representative from Kentucky 1907–26. Husband of Katherine G. Langley.

== The Guggenheims ==
- Solomon R. Guggenheim (1861–1949), delegate to the Republican National Convention 1924. Brother of Simon Guggenheim.
- Simon Guggenheim (1867–1941), U.S. Senator from Colorado 1907–13. Brother of Solomon R. Guggenheim.
  - Meyer Guggenheim (1885–1959), U.S. Ambassador to Portugal 1953–54. Nephew of Solomon R. Guggenheim and Simon Guggenheim.
  - Harry Frank Guggenheim (1890–1971), U.S. Ambassador to Cuba 1929–33. Nephew of Solomon R. Guggenheim and Simon Guggenheim.
  - V. Henry Rothschild II (1908–1991), candidate for Justice of the New York Supreme Court 1959. Nephew by marriage of Solomon R. Guggenheim and son of Victor Henry Rothschild.

NOTE: Harry Frank Guggenheim was also grandson-in-law of U.S. Secretary of Agriculture J. Sterling Morton, son-in-law of U.S. Secretary of the Navy Paul Morton, and brother-in-law of Republican National Committeewoman Pauline Sabin and U.S. Secretary of War Dwight F. Davis.

== The Gulottas ==
- Frank A. Gulotta (1907–1989), New York State Supreme Court Justice 1958–71, New York State Appellate Division Court 1971–77, Senior Associate Justice 1977–83, District Attorney of Nassau County, New York 1949–58, Assistant District Attorney of Nassau County, New York 1938–49, Lynbrook, New York Village Council and Zoning 1930s. Father of Thomas Gulotta and Frank A. Gulotta Jr.
  - Frank A. Gulotta Jr, Nassau County, New York Supreme Court Judge 2009–13, Nassau County Court Judge 1996–2005, Judge of New York Court of Claims 2005–09, Assistant District Attorney of Nassau County 1965–69. Son of Frank Gulotta, Brother or Thomas Gulotta.
  - Thomas Gulotta (Born 1944), New York State Assemblyman 1977–81, Presiding Supervisor of Town of Hempstead, New York 1981–86, County Executive of Nassau County, New York 1987–2001.

== The Gunters ==
- Thomas M. Gunter (1826–1904), U.S. Representative from Arkansas 1874–83. Father of Julius Caldeen Gunter.
  - Julius Caldeen Gunter (1858–1940), District Court Judge in Colorado 1889–95, Judge of the Colorado Court of Appeals 1901–05, Justice of the Colorado Supreme Court 1905–07, Governor of Colorado 1917–19. Son of Thomas M. Gunter.

== The Gurleys ==
- Henry Hosford Gurley (1788–1833), U.S. Representative from Louisiana 1823–31, District Judge in Louisiana. Brother of John Ward Gurley.
- John Ward Gurley, Secretary of the Territory of Orleans. Brother of Henry Hosford Gurley.
