= Stephen Greaves =

Stephen Greaves is the name of:

- Stephen A. D. Greaves (1817-1880), American army officer, plantation owner, lawyer, and Democratic politician
- Stephen A. D. Greaves Jr. (1854-1915), American planter and politician
