= Robert J. Gamble =

American politician (1851–1924)

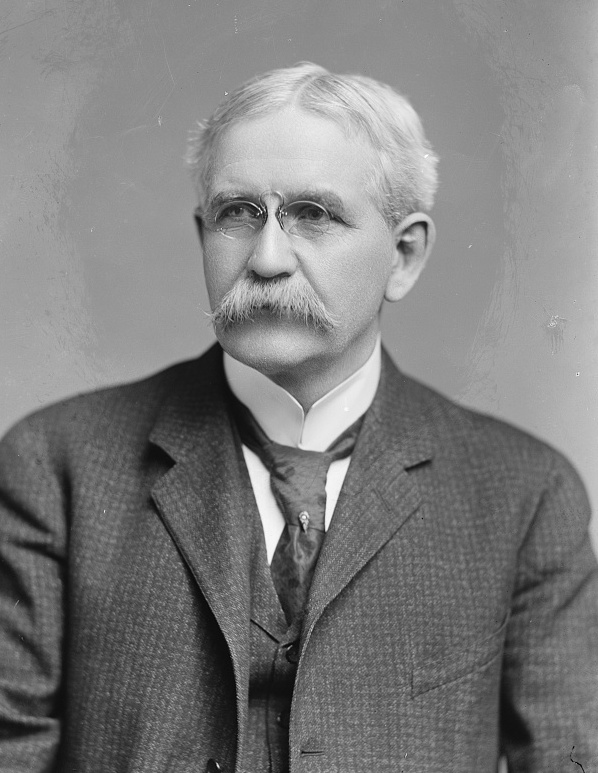
- Gamble, c. March 1905–August 1906, by C. M. Bell Studio

United States Senator from South Dakota
- In office March 4, 1901 – March 3, 1913
- Preceded by: Richard F. Pettigrew
- Succeeded by: Thomas Sterling

Member of the U.S. House of Representatives from South Dakota's at-large district
- In office March 4, 1899 – March 3, 1901
- Preceded by: Freeman T. Knowles
- Succeeded by: Eben W. Martin
- In office March 4, 1895 – March 3, 1897
- Preceded by: William V. Lucas
- Succeeded by: Freeman T. Knowles

Personal details
- Born: Robert Jackson Gamble; February 7, 1851 Genesee County, New York, U.S.
- Died: September 22, 1924 (aged 73) Sioux Falls, South Dakota, U.S.
- Resting place: Yankton City Cemetery
- Party: Republican
- Relations: Gamble family

Robert Jackson Gamble (February 7, 1851 – September 22, 1924) was an American politician who served as a U.S. representative and senator from South Dakota. He was the father of Ralph A. Gamble and brother of John Rankin Gamble, members of South Dakota's prominent Gamble family.

== Early life ==
Gamble was born in Genesee County, near Akron, New York, the son of Robert Gamble and Jennie (Abernethy) Gamble. In 1862, he moved with his parents to Fox Lake, Wisconsin. In 1874, he graduated from Lawrence University in Appleton, Wisconsin with a Bachelor of Science degree, and he later received his Master of Science from Lawrence. While attending college, Gamble taught school in the summer to pay his tuition. After graduating, he studied law with the Milwaukee firm of Jenkins, Elliot & Wheeler, and was admitted to the bar in 1875. He moved to Yankton in the portion of the Dakota Territory which later became South Dakota.

== Start of career ==
A Republican, he became a district attorney for the second judicial district of the Territory of Dakota in 1880, and was Yankton's city attorney in 1881 and 1882. He served on the Territorial Council in 1885. In 1894, he was elected to Seat B, one of South Dakota's two at-large seats in the U.S. House of Representatives, and he served in the Fifty-fourth Congress. He ran unsuccessfully for reelection in 1896, but was again elected to Seat B in 1898, and served in the Fifty-sixth Congress. During the Fifty-sixth Congress, he became the chairman of the U.S. House Committee on Expenditures on the Public Buildings.

== U.S. Senator ==
In 1901, Gamble was elected to the United States Senate. Re-elected in 1906, he served until March 1913, after being an unsuccessful candidate for renomination. During his senate career, he was chairman of the: Committee on Indian Depredations (57th Congress); Committee on Transportation Routes to the Seaboard (58th to 60th Congresses); Committee on Indian Affairs (62nd Congress); and Committee on Enrolled Bills (64th Congress).

== Later life, death and legacy ==
In 1915, Gamble moved to Sioux Falls and resumed the practice of law. From 1916 to 1924, he served as a referee in bankruptcy for the southern district of South Dakota. He was a member of the National Executive Committee of the League to Enforce Peace.

Gamble died in Sioux Falls on September 22, 1924, aged 73, and was buried at Yankton City Cemetery in Yankton.

In 1909, Lawrence University posthumnously awarded Gamble the honorary LL.D.

== Family ==
In 1884, Gamble married Carrie S. Osborne of Portage, Wisconsin. They were the parents of two sons, Ralph and George.

== Sources ==
=== Books ===
- Coursey, Oscar William (1913). Who's Who in South Dakota. Vol. I. Mitchell, SD: Educator School Supply Co.
- Lawrence College (1918). Lawrence College Alumni Record, 1857-1915. Appleton, WI: Post Publishing Company.
- United States Congress (2005). Biographical Directory of the United States Congress, 1774-2005. Washington, DC: US Government Printing Office. ISBN 978-0-16-073176-1.

U.S. House of Representatives
Preceded by William V. Lucas	South Dakota's at-large congressional district 1895–1897	Succeeded by Freeman T. Knowles
Preceded by Freeman T. Knowles	South Dakota's at-large congressional district 1899–1901	Succeeded by Eben W. Martin
U.S. Senate
Preceded by Richard F. Pettigrew	United States Senator (Class 2) from South Dakota; 1901–1913	Succeeded by Thomas Sterling
