= Harry B. Greaves =

American politician (1867–1944)

Member of the Mississippi State Senate from the 18th district
- In office January 1902 – January 1908
- Preceded by: James O. Looney

Member of the Mississippi House of Representatives from the Madison County district
- In office January 1894 – January 1896

Personal details
- Born: December 13, 1867 Madison County, Mississippi, U.S.
- Died: July 1944 (aged 76) Canton, Mississippi, U.S.
- Party: Democratic
- Parent: Stephen A. D. Greaves (father)

Harry Battley Greaves (December 13, 1867 - July 1944) was an American lawyer and Democratic politician. He represented Madison County in the Mississippi State Senate from 1902 to 1908 and in the Mississippi House of Representatives from 1894 to 1896.

== Early life ==
Harry Battley Greaves was born on December 13, 1867, near Livingston, Madison County, Mississippi. He was the son of lawyer, Confederate general and former member of the Mississippi House of Representatives Stephen A. D. Greaves Sr. and his second wife, Jennie (Battley) Greaves. Greaves attended the "primary schools" of Madison County. He then attended the Mississippi Military Institute at Pass Christian from 1881 to 1882, Mississippi College between 1882 and 1884, and the Mississippi A & M College (now Mississippi State University) in 1885, finishing his sophomore year there.

== Career ==
After completing his sophomore year, Greaves left school to become a teacher and study law at the same time. He was admitted to the Mississippi State Bar in November 1889 in Canton, Mississippi, and then began practicing law there. In 1893, Greaves was elected to fill an unexpired term in the Mississippi House of Representatives, and represented Madison County as a Democrat in the 1894 session. On January 15, 1902, Greaves was elected to fill in an unexpired term (of 18th District senator James O. Looney) in the Mississippi State Senate, and served in the 1902 session. Greaves was re-elected to represent the 18th Senate District on November 3, 1903, and served the term from 1904 to 1908. Greaves continued his law practice until his health failed circa 1940, about 4 years before his death.

== Personal life ==
Greaves was a member of the Episcopalian Church. He was also a member of the Knights of Pythias, the Woodmen of the World, and the Elks.

Greaves married Eliza Mosby Parker on January 12, 1897. They had two children before 1904, Florence Parker Greaves and Stephen Arne Decatur Greaves, and a child born after 1904 named Harry B. Greaves.

Greaves died after a stroke at his home in Canton, Mississippi, in July 1944. He was survived by his widow and his sons Stephen and Harry.
