= United States Congressional Joint Committee on Housing =

The United States Congress Joint Committee on Housing was established July 25, 1947 in response to the housing shortages in the US after World War II.

Home building virtually stopped during World War II as supplies and labor were diverted elsewhere. When the veterans returned to civilian life at the end of the war, an acute housing shortage developed. In an effort to deal with this crisis, Congress established the Joint Committee on Housing, with members drawn from the House and Senate Committees on Banking and Currency. The Committee conducted hearings in 33 cities, receiving testimony from 1,286 witnesses. It also undertook extensive studies on specific subjects and conferred informally with industry and labor leaders.

Ralph A. Gamble served as chairman during the 80th United States Congress.

The Committee submitted its final report (House Report 1564, 80th Congress, 2nd session, Serial 11210) on March 15, 1948.
