= John L. Jolley =

American politician

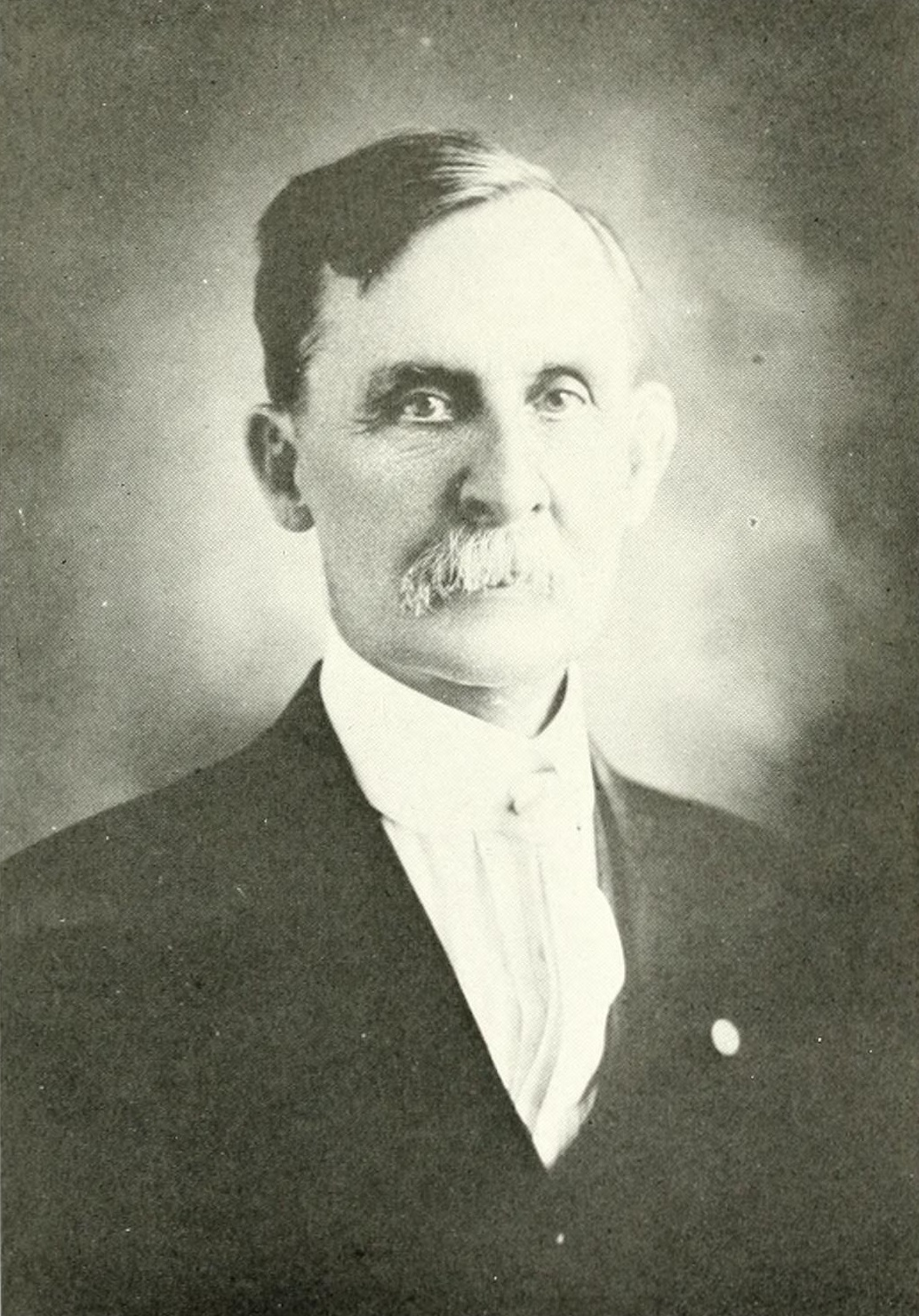

Member of the U.S. House of Representatives from South Dakota's at-large district
- In office December 7, 1891 – March 3, 1893
- Preceded by: John Rankin Gamble
- Succeeded by: William V. Lucas

Personal details
- Born: July 14, 1840 Montreal, Upper Canada (now Quebec)
- Died: December 14, 1926 (aged 86) Vermillion, South Dakota, U.S.
- Party: Republican

John Lawlor Jolley (July 14, 1840 – December 14, 1926) was a member of the United States House of Representatives from South Dakota.

== Biography ==
He was born in Montreal, Upper Canada (now Quebec) in 1840, where he attended the common schools. He graduated from Eastman Business College in Poughkeepsie, New York. He moved to Wisconsin in 1857, and enlisted as a private in Company C, Twenty-third Regiment, of the Wisconsin Volunteer Infantry. He was mustered out as a second lieutenant on July 4, 1865.

He took up the study of the law and was admitted to the bar in 1866. Vermillion of the Dakota Territory.is where he first established his practice. He was a member of the territorial council in 1875 and 1881. In 1887 and 1895, he was elected mayor of Vermillion. He was a delegate to the Republican National Convention in 1884.

In 1889, he was a delegate to the state constitutional convention. He was also selected for the South Dakota State Senate in 1889. In 1891 he was elected to Seat B, one of South Dakota's two at-large seats in the United States House of Representatives, filling the vacancy caused by the death of John Rankin Gamble. He chose not to seek a full term, and resumed the practice of law. He died in Vermillion in 1926, and was buried at Vermillion's Bluff View Cemetery.

Jolley Elementary School, in Vermillion, SD, is named after Mr. Jolley.

U.S. House of Representatives
Preceded by John Rankin Gamble	Member of the U.S. House of Representatives from South Dakota's at-large congressional district 1891–1893	Succeeded by William V. Lucas
