= Clarence B. Greaves =

American politician

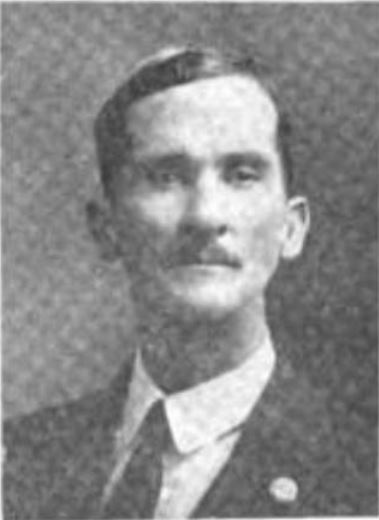
- c. 1917

Member of the Mississippi Senate from the 18th district
- In office January 1912 – January 1920
- In office January 1896 – January 1900

Member of the Mississippi House of Representatives from the Madison County district
- In office January 1904 – January 1908

Personal details
- Born: August 22, 1863 Livingston, Mississippi
- Died: August 1940 (aged 76–77)
- Party: Democrat
- Parent: Stephen A. D. Greaves

Clarence Budney Greaves (August 22, 1863 – August 1940) was an American lawyer and Democratic member of the Mississippi state legislature in the late 19th and early 20th centuries. He represented the Mississippi's 18th senatorial district in the Mississippi Senate from 1896 to 1900 and from 1912 to 1920, and represented Madison County in the Mississippi House of Representatives from 1904 to 1908.

== Early life ==
Clarence Budney Greaves was born on August 22, 1863, in Livingston, Mississippi. He was the son of Stephen Arne Decatur Greaves, a lawyer who represented Hinds County in the Mississippi House of Representatives, and Sarah (Lowe) Greaves. Clarence's older brother, Stephen A. D. Greaves Jr., would also represent Hinds County in the Mississippi House from 1908 to 1912. Clarence Greaves attended the primary schools of Madison County. He moved to Flora, Mississippi, in 1879. He attended Mississippi Agricultural & Mechanical College (now Mississippi State University) for one year. He read law and was admitted to the bar in Canton, Mississippi, in 1889.

== Political career ==
Greaves was elected to represent Mississippi's 18th district in the Mississippi Senate as a Democrat in 1895 for the 1896–1900 term. He then represented Madison County in the Mississippi House of Representatives from 1904 to 1908. He then represented the 18th district in the Senate again from 1912 to 1920, being re-elected in 1915. From 1916 to 1920, he was the chairman of the senate's Public Works committee.

== Later life and death ==
Greaves stopped practicing law due to partial blindness. In August 1940, he was killed in an automobile accident when the partially-blind Greaves stepped in front of an incoming car. The driver of the car, Mrs. S. A. Terry, had swerved the car into an embankment in a failed attempt to avoid hitting him. Terry was cleared of wrongdoing after initial questioning; the Investigating Patrolman found the accident "unavoidable".

== Personal life ==
Greaves was a member of the Methodist Church and Woodmen of the World. Greaves married Elizabeth Baker, a descendant of John J. Pettus, on July 16, 1893, in Pocahontas, Mississippi. They had six children: Leila Crisler (Greaves) Naquin, Harry Battley Greaves, Clarence Budney Greaves Jr, Eleanor Elizabeth, Mary Baker, and Charles Scott.
