= John L. Gleason =

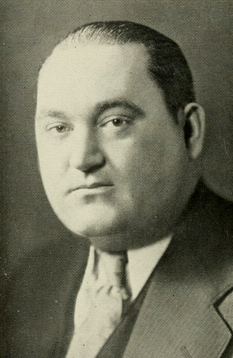

Member of the Massachusetts House of Representatives for the 9th Suffolk District
- In office 1935–1936
- Preceded by: John J. Craven
- Succeeded by: John J. Craven / David M. Owens Jr.

Personal details
- Born: June 27, 1903 Roxbury
- Died: January 8, 1936 (aged 32) Roxbury
- Party: Democratic

John Leo Gleason (June 27, 1903 – January 8, 1936) was an American politician who was a member of the Massachusetts House of Representatives from 1935 to 1936.

Gleason was born on June 27, 1903, in Boston. His older brother, Richard D. Gleason, ran a political machine in Boston's Ward 9 and served in the Massachusetts House of Representatives and the Boston City Council. The younger Gleason served as a city constable and was elected to the Massachusetts House of Representatives in 1934. On January 7, 1936, Gleason was admitted to the Boston City Hospital for stomach ulcers. He died suddenly the following morning at his home in Roxbury. In the election to fill Gleason's seat, the Gleason vote was split between his sister Mildred M. Harris and his widow, Mary Gleason.
