= Charles D. Millard =

American politician (1873–1944)

Charles Dunsmore Millard
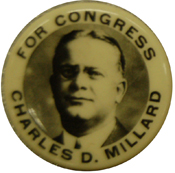
- Campaign button, circa 1934

Member of the U.S. House of Representatives from New York's 25th district
- In office March 4, 1931 – September 29, 1937
- Preceded by: J. Mayhew Wainwright
- Succeeded by: Ralph A. Gamble

Personal details
- Born: December 1, 1873 Tarrytown, New York, U.S.
- Died: December 11, 1944 (aged 71) New York City, U.S.
- Party: Republican
- Education: Brown University; New York University School of Law

Charles Dunsmore Millard (December 1, 1873 – December 11, 1944) was a Republican member of the United States House of Representatives from New York.

== Biography ==
Millard was born in Tarrytown, New York. He attended Phillips Academy, Brown University, and New York University School of Law. He was Supervisor of the Town of Greenburgh (a member of the Board of Supervisors of Westchester County) from 1907 to 1931. He was elected to Congress in 1930 and represented New York's 25th congressional district from March 4, 1931, until his resignation on September 29, 1937, to serve as surrogate of Westchester County. During the 74th Congress, Millard was assigned to the Immigration and Naturalization Committee and Naval Affairs Committee. He retired in 1943.

He died from suicide on December 11, 1944, by jumping from the Henry Hudson Bridge in New York City.

== Sources ==
- United States Congress. "Charles D. Millard (id: M000709)". Biographical Directory of the United States Congress.

U.S. House of Representatives
Preceded by J. Mayhew Wainwright	Member of the U.S. House of Representatives from New York's 25th congressional district 1931–1937	Succeeded by Ralph A. Gamble
