= James E. Agnew =

American politician

Boston Corporation Counsel
- In office 1945–1946
- Preceded by: Frank Jerome Murray
- Succeeded by: Joseph A. Scolponeti

Massachusetts Fish and Game Commissioner
- In office 1939–1941
- Preceded by: Patrick W. Hehir
- Succeeded by: Horatio S. Dumont

Member of the Boston City Councilor from Ward 21
- In office 1934–1939
- Preceded by: James Hein
- Succeeded by: Michael J. Ward

Personal details
- Died: October 30, 1956 (aged 65) Boston, Massachusetts, U.S.
- Party: Democratic
- Education: Boston University School of Law

James E. Agnew was an American politician who served as a Boston City Councilor, Massachusetts Fish and Game Commissioner, and Corporation Counsel of Boston.

== Early life ==
Agnew was born in South Boston. His parents were from Carrickmacross. His father died when Agnew was 16 and he became head of his family. He worked at a department store, first as an office boy, then as a salesman. He also pursued musical training and eventually formed his own orchestra. Music provided Agnew with enough money to fund his studies at the Boston University School of Law. His education was interrupted by World War I. He enlisted in the United States Marine Corps and was assigned to the morale section. After the war he toured veteran's hospitals and other places were servicemen met. He made enough money to go back to law school. He graduated in 1926.

== Political career ==
In 1931, Agnew ran for Boston City Council in Ward 21. He finished second in the eight candidate race behind incumbent James Hein.

In 1933, he was elected to represent Brighton. In 1938 he was nominated by Governor Charles F. Hurley for the position of director of Fisheries and Game. Agnew chose to remain on the council, but stated that he would not run for reelection. He was confirmed by the Massachusetts Governor's Council on January 3, 1939. That same day, he was a candidate for city council president. His election was opposed a group of eight freshmen councilors and one second term member (Mildred M. Harris), who voted for William J. Galvin. Agnew and Galvin each had nine votes, while the three Republican councilors refused to vote for either.

Agnew withdrew from the race on January 13, citing his added duties as Fish and Game Commissioner. He backed George A. Murray, who went on to win the presidency on the 11th ballot. In 1942, Agnew was the Democratic nominee for Massachusetts Attorney General. He lost to Republican Robert T. Bushnell 56% to 43%. During World War II, Agnew served as a special assistant United States attorney investigating war fraud. In 1945, Governor Maurice J. Tobin nominated Agnew for the position of conservation commissioner.

Agnew refused the appointment and two months later accepted the position of corporation council of Boston. In 1950 he was a candidate for clerk of the Supreme Judicial Court for Suffolk County. The sixteen-candidate race was won by Chester A. Dolan Jr.

== Death ==
Agnew died on October 30, 1956, in Boston following a long illness. He was 65 years old.

Party political offices
Preceded by James Henry Brennan	Democratic nominee for Attorney General of Massachusetts; 1942	Succeeded by Francis E. Kelly
