= Edwin B. Dooley =

American journalist and politician (1905–1982)

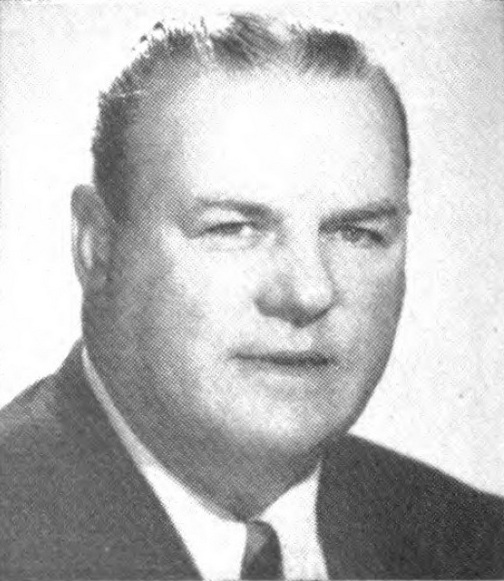

Member of the U.S. House of Representatives from New York's 26th district
- In office January 3, 1957 – January 3, 1963
- Preceded by: Ralph A. Gamble
- Succeeded by: Ogden Reid

Chairman of the New York State Athletic Commission
- In office 1966–1975
- Preceded by: Melvin Krulewitch
- Succeeded by: James A. Farley Jr.

Mayor of Mamaroneck, New York
- In office 1951–1956
- Preceded by: Battista J. Santoro
- Succeeded by: Alexander Schwab

Personal details
- Born: Edwin Benedict Dooley; April 13, 1905 Brooklyn, New York, US
- Died: January 25, 1982 (aged 76) Boca Raton, Florida, US
- Resting place: Gate of Heaven Cemetery, Hawthorne, New York
- Party: Republican
- Spouse(s): Harriette M. Feeley; Anita M. Gilles; Margaret Sheffel
- Children: Edwin B. Dooley, Jr.
- Education: Dartmouth College; Fordham University School of Law

Edwin Benedict Dooley (April 13, 1905 – January 25, 1982) was a Republican member of the United States House of Representatives from New York.

== Early life ==
Edwin B. "Eddie" Dooley was born in Brooklyn, New York, on April 13, 1905. He graduated from Dartmouth College in 1927, and was an All American as quarterback of the football team. He graduated from Fordham University School of Law in 1930.

== Start of career ==
Dooley was a feature writer on sports for the New York Sun from 1927 until 1938, and was a radio sports broadcaster in New York City from 1936 to 1948. From 1938 to 1955 Dooley pursued a career as a public relations executive for General Foods.

During World War II Dooley served as a member of committees on food production and distribution for the War and Navy departments.

== Political career ==
Dooley was a trustee of the village of Mamaroneck from 1942 to 1946, and mayor from 1951 until 1956.

In 1956 Dooley was a successful candidate for the United States House. He was reelected in 1958 and 1960, and served from January 3, 1957, until January 3, 1963. He was an unsuccessful candidate for renomination in 1962. Dooley voted in favor of the civil rights acts of 1957 and 1960, but voted present on the 24th Amendment to ban poll taxes.

== Post-Congressional career ==
After leaving Congress, Dooley returned to his career in public relations and worked as a lobbyist in Washington, D.C. From 1966 to 1975 he served as chairman of the New York State Athletic Commission. In this role, he generated controversy when he suspended the boxing license of Muhammad Ali for refusing to be drafted into the Army. In 1972, he changed the policy on access for women sports journalists, permitting them to occupy seats reserved for the press and to enter dressing rooms provided that male athletes were properly attired.

== Death and burial ==
He died in Boca Raton, Florida, on January 25, 1982. He was cremated, and his ashes were scattered at the family grave site in Hawthorne's Gate of Heaven Cemetery.

== Family ==
Dooley met his first wife, Harriette M. Feeley of Norwich, Vermont, while they were in college, and they married in 1926. After her death in 1952 he married Anita M. Gilles, who died in 1962. His third wife, Margaret Sheffel, survived him, as did his son, Edwin B. Dooley Jr. (1933–2008).

== Sources ==
- United States Congress. "Edwin B. Dooley (id: D000425)". Biographical Directory of the United States Congress.

U.S. House of Representatives
Preceded by Ralph A. Gamble	Member of the U.S. House of Representatives from New York's 26th congressional district 1957–1963	Succeeded by Ogden R. Reid
