= William V. Lucas =

American politician

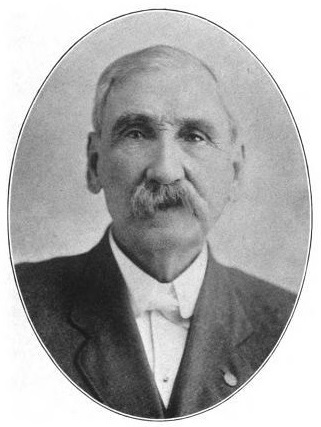

Member of the U.S. House of Representatives from South Dakota's at-large district
- In office March 4, 1893 – March 3, 1895
- Preceded by: John L. Jolley
- Succeeded by: Robert J. Gamble

9th State Auditor of Iowa
- In office 1881–1882
- Governor: John H. Gear
- Preceded by: Buren R. Sherman
- Succeeded by: John L. Brown

Personal details
- Born: William Vincent Lucas; July 3, 1835 Delphi, Indiana, U.S.
- Died: November 10, 1921 (aged 86) Santa Cruz, California, U.S.
- Party: Republican

William Vincent Lucas (July 3, 1835 – November 10, 1921) was a United States politician, within the Republican party. He served as the State Auditor of Iowa; and later a member of the United States House of Representatives from South Dakota.

== Biography ==
Born near Delphi, Indiana, Lucas moved to Iowa in 1856. At the start of the American Civil War Lucas joined the Union Army, enlisting as a private, and then receiving a First Lieutenant's commission in Company B, 14th Iowa Volunteer Infantry Regiment. He was a Captain when he was discharged at the end of the war.

After returning to Iowa, Lucas served as Bremer County Treasurer from 1866 until 1872. He was editor of the Waverly Republican from 1872 to 1876, and editor of the Cerro Gordo Republican from 1876 to 1883.

A Republican. in 1878 he was appointed Chief Clerk of the Iowa House of Representatives, a post he held until 1880. From 1879 to 1880 Lucas served as Mayor of Mason City.

Lucas served as Iowa's State Auditor from 1881 until 1882. At the completion of his term he moved to Chamberlain, South Dakota. Lucas became a farmer, and served as Treasurer of Brule County from 1888 to 1890.

When the Soldiers Home in Hot Springs was constructed in 1890, Lucas was appointed the first commandant with the rank of Colonel, and he served from 1890 until 1894.

In 1892 Lucas was elected to Seat B, one of South Dakota's two at-large seats in the United States House of Representatives, and he served one term, March 4, 1893, to March 3, 1895. He was an unsuccessful candidate for renomination in 1894, and served as a Delegate to the 1896 Republican National Convention.

In 1897 Lucas moved back to Chamberlain, where he served as Register of the United States Land Office until 1901. Lucas served as commandant of the Hot Springs Soldiers Home again from 1901 to 1903.

In 1904 Lucas moved to Santa Cruz, California, where he lived in semi-retirement while writing a column, Pen Points, for the Santa Cruz Sentinel. He was active in the Presbyterian Church and the Grand Army of the Republic. In addition, letters Lucas submitted for publication to the Waverly Democrat in Iowa were compiled and published as 1918's Pioneer Days of Bremer County, Iowa.

During World War I Lucas was a Four Minute Man, one of thousands of volunteers who made speeches in support of the war effort. In addition, he served as a member of Santa Cruz's draft board.

Lucas died in Santa Cruz on November 10, 1921. He was buried at Oakwood Memorial Park in Santa Cruz, California.

Political offices
| Preceded by Buren R. Sherman | State Auditor of Iowa; 1881–1882 | Succeeded by John L. Brown |
U.S. House of Representatives
| Preceded by John L. Jolley | Member of the U.S. House of Representatives from South Dakota's at-large congressional district March 4, 1893 – March 3, 1895 | Succeeded by Robert J. Gamble |
