= Beatties Bluff, Mississippi =

- Ghost town
- Location within Mississippi Location within the United States
- Coordinates: 32°39′49″N 90°11′51″W
- Country: United States
- State: Mississippi
- County: Madison
- Elevation: 160 ft (50 m)
- Time zone: UTC-6 (Central (CST))
  - Summer (DST): UTC-5 (CDT)

Beatties Bluff (also Beattie's Bluff) is a ghost town and former county seat in Madison County, Mississippi, United States. Once a thriving hamlet on the south shore of the Big Black River, which formed the northern boundary of the county, the settlement declined when it was replaced as the county seat. Nothing remains of it. In 2001, a new $32 million wastewater treatment plant was constructed here as part of infrastructure support for a Nissan plant in Canton. It is in the Central Standard Time Zone which is GMT+6.

== History ==
Beatties Bluff was founded in the early 1800s as an outpost along the Natchez Trace. When Yazoo County was created in 1823, Beatties Bluff was made its first county seat. In 1829, the county seat was moved to Benton. When Madison County was created in 1828, it too named Beatties Bluff as its first county seat. Soon after, the county seat was moved to Livingston.

Boats ascended the Big Black River to Beatties Bluff, which had a post office, court house, and other buildings made of hewn logs.

In 1835, rumors of a slave uprising were overheard on a plantation at Beatties Bluff. Slaves there were tortured to extract information, which led to the arrest and quick execution of two itinerant white men. This incident coincided with the general hysteria about slave uprisings known as the "Murrell Excitement".

When Beatties Bluff was replaced a second time as the county seat, it immediately lost businesses and residents to the new judicial center. It eventually became extinct.

In 2000, Nissan Motor Company began construction of a vehicle assembly plant in nearby Canton. As part of the infrastructure, a site just west of the old town was selected in 2001 for the construction of the Beatties Bluff Wastewater Treatment Facility, capable of processing 8,000,000 US gal (30,000,000 L) of water per day.
