= Way, Mississippi =

- Unincorporated community
- Location within Mississippi Location within the United States
- Coordinates: 32°44′38″N 90°01′59″W
- Country: United States
- State: Mississippi
- County: Madison
- Elevation: 210 ft (64 m)
- Time zone: UTC-6 (Central (CST))
  - Summer (DST): UTC-5 (CDT)
- ZIP code: 39046
- Area code: 601
- GNIS feature ID: 679398

Way is an unincorporated community located in Madison County, Mississippi. Way is approximately 9 miles (14 km) north of Canton on Way Road.

Way is located within the Jackson Metropolitan Statistical Area.

== History ==
Way is located on the Grenada Railroad. A post office operated under the name Way's Bluff from 1858 to 1895 and under the name Way from 1895 to 1968.

In 1900, the community had a population of 36.

The Allison's Wells Hotel—described as a stately structure with a large ballroom—was located in Way. In 1948, the Mississippi Art Colony was organized at the hotel. The hotel was destroyed by fire in 1963.

Camp Bratton-Green, the summer camping program of the Episcopal Diocese of Mississippi, housed on the campus of the Duncan M. Gray Center, is located in Way, Mississippi.
