= John Rankin Gamble =

American politician (1848–1891)

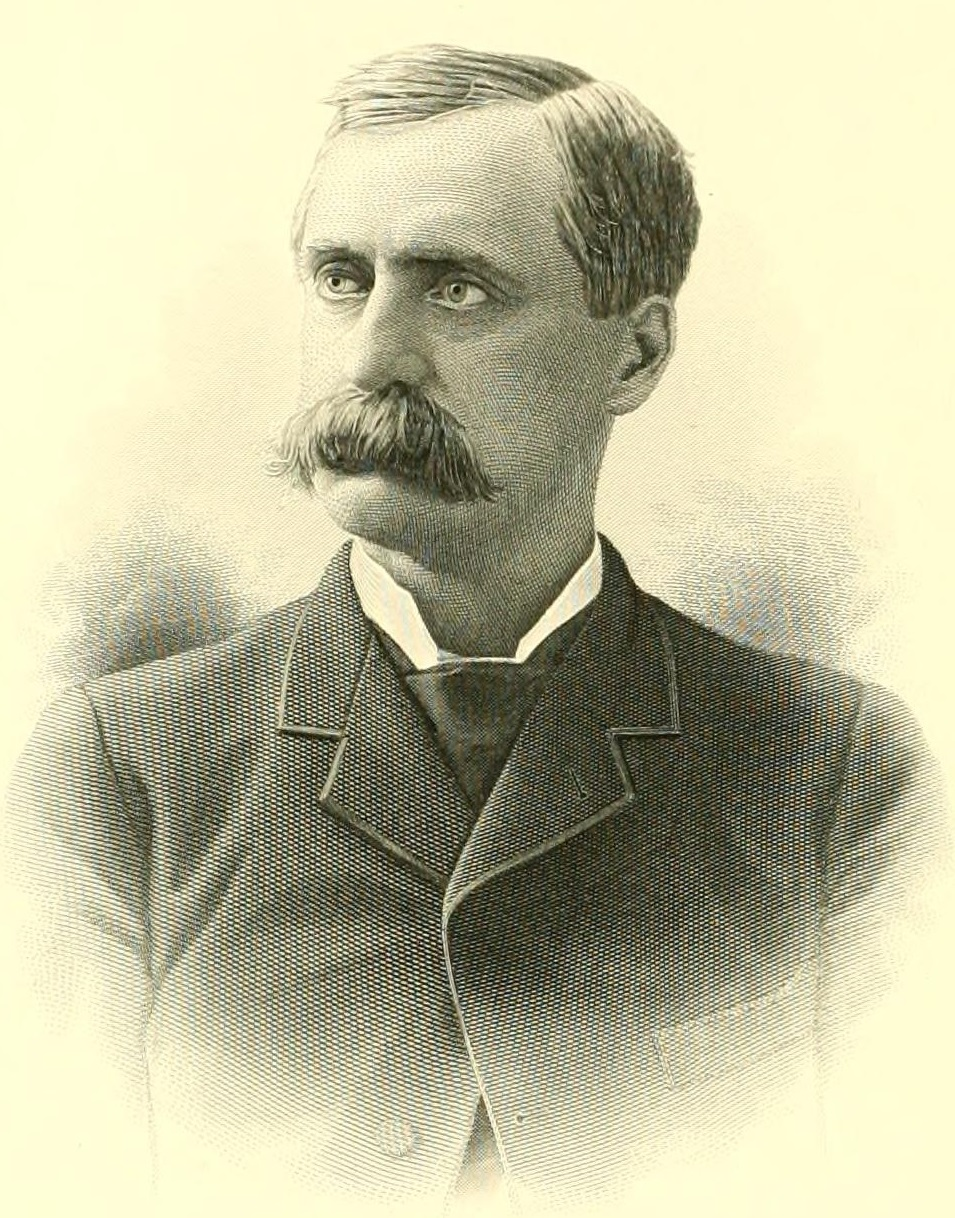
- 1893 lithograph of Gamble

Member of the U.S. House of Representatives from South Dakota's at-large district
- In office March 4, 1891 – August 14, 1891
- Preceded by: Oscar S. Gifford
- Succeeded by: John L. Jolley

Personal details
- Born: January 15, 1848 Alabama, New York, U.S.
- Died: August 14, 1891 (aged 43) Yankton, South Dakota, U.S.
- Party: Republican
- Education: Lawrence University

John Rankin Gamble (January 15, 1848 – August 14, 1891) was a lawyer and politician from South Dakota. He was born in Alabama, New York in 1848, and was the brother of Robert J. Gamble and uncle of Ralph Abernethy Gamble.

He attended the common schools in New York, and moved with his family to Fox Lake, Wisconsin, and graduated from Lawrence University in 1872. He later studied law, and was admitted to the bar in 1873.

He started his practice in Yankton in the Dakota Territory, becoming the district attorney for Yankton County from 1876–1878, and the United States attorney for the Dakota Territory in 1878. He was elected to the Territorial House of Representatives in 1877, and served there until 1879. He also served in the Territorial council from 1881 to 1885.

In 1890, Gamble was elected to Seat B, one of two South Dakota at-large seats in the United States House of Representatives. He served from March 4, 1891 until his death in Yankton on August 14, 1891. Gamble was buried at Yankton City Cemetery.

== See also ==
- List of members of the United States Congress who died in office (1790–1899)

U.S. House of Representatives
Preceded by Oscar S. Gifford	Member of the U.S. House of Representatives from South Dakota's at-large congressional district March 4, 1891 - August 14, 1891	Succeeded by John L. Jolley
