= Vernon, Madison County, Mississippi =

Vernon, Mississippi
- Unincorporated community
- Location within Mississippi Location within the United States
- Coordinates: 32°35′23″N 90°19′47″W
- Country: United States
- State: Mississippi
- County: Madison
- Elevation: 190 ft (58 m)
- Time zone: UTC-6 (Central (CST))
  - Summer (DST): UTC-5 (CDT)
- GNIS feature ID: 679206

Vernon is an unincorporated community in Madison County, Mississippi, United States.

== History ==
Vernon was incorporated in 1833 and disincorporated at an unknown time. A post office operated under the name Vernon from 1828 to 1887.

In 1835, John Murrell's gang planned to attack Vernon on the night of July 4, but the attack was never carried out.

Company I of the 18th Mississippi Infantry Regiment was organized at Vernon in 1861.
