= Freeman Knowles =

American lawyer and politician (1846–1910)

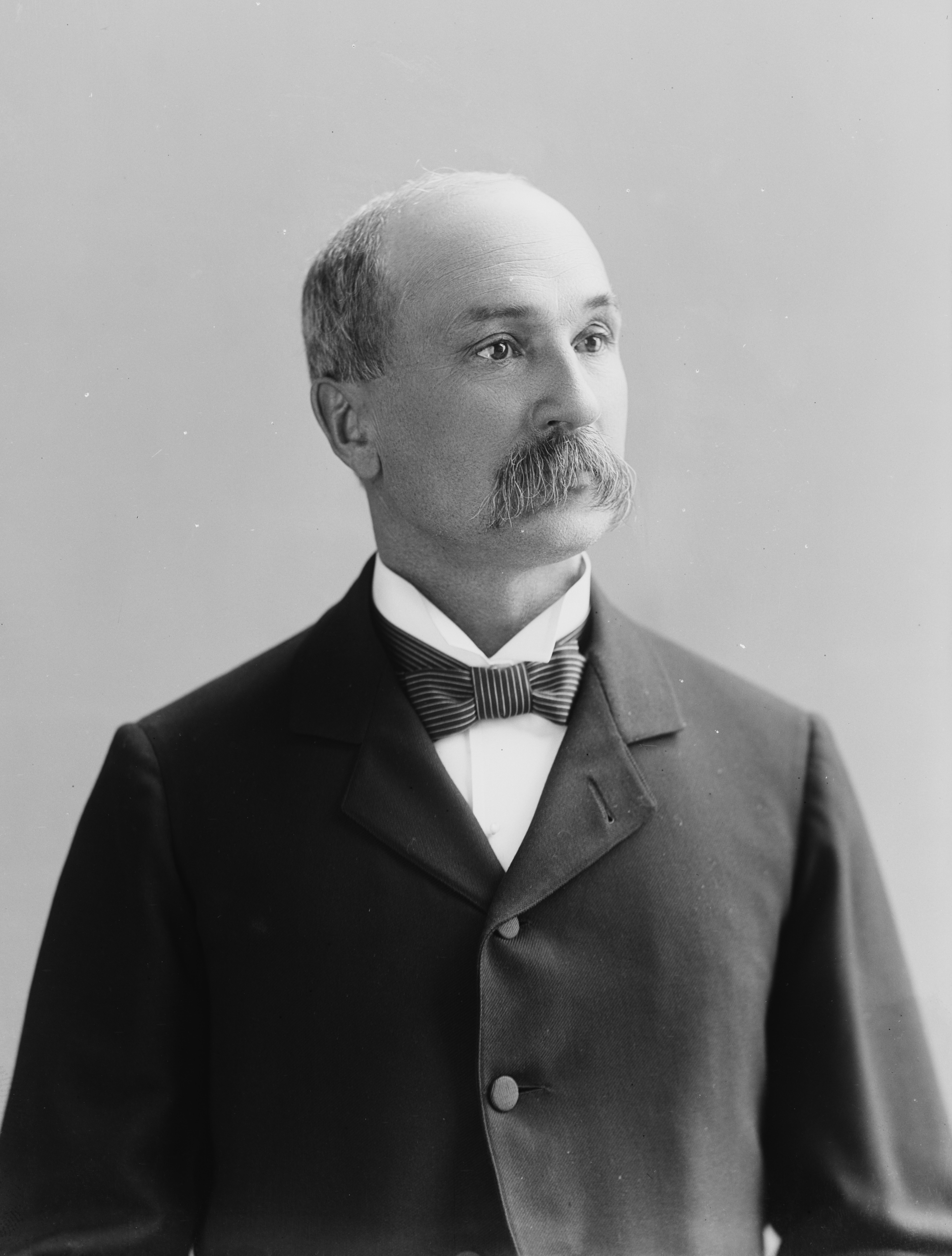
- Portrait by C. M. Bell c. 1897–1899

Member of the U.S. House of Representatives from South Dakota's At-Large district
- In office March 4, 1897 – March 3, 1899
- Preceded by: Robert J. Gamble
- Succeeded by: Robert J. Gamble

Personal details
- Born: October 10, 1846 Harmony, Maine, U.S.
- Died: June 1, 1910 (aged 63) Deadwood, South Dakota, U.S.
- Resting place: Mount Moriah Cemetery, Deadwood, South Dakota, U.S.
- Party: Populist
- Other political affiliations: Socialist (1900s)
- Occupation: Attorney

Freeman Tulley Knowles (October 10, 1846 – June 1, 1910) was a veteran of the American Civil War, lawyer, journalist and social activist. From 1897 to 1899, he served one term in the United States House of Representatives as a Populist.

== Biography ==
Knowles was born in Harmony, Maine, and educated at the local schools and Bloomfield Academy in Skowhegan.

=== Civil War ===
He enlisted for the American Civil War in 1862, joining the 16th Maine Volunteer Infantry Regiment. He served until the end of the war, took part in several battles including the Battle of Gettysburg, and attained the rank of Corporal.

=== Career ===
After the war Knowles moved to Denison, Iowa, where he studied law and attained admission to the bar. He practiced in Denison from 1869 until 1886, when he moved to Nebraska to become publisher of the Ceresco Times.

Knowles moved to Tilford, South Dakota in 1888 to begin publication of the Meade County Times. He subsequently moved to Deadwood to publish the Evening Independent.

=== Congress ===
In addition to his activities in journalism, Knowles became active in the Populist Party. After running unsuccessfully for Seat A in 1894, in 1896 he was elected to Seat B, one of South Dakota's two at-large seats in the United States House of Representatives. He served in the 55th United States Congress, March 4, 1897 to March 3, 1899, and was an unsuccessful candidate for reelection in 1898.

=== Later career ===
Knowles later became involved with the Socialist Party of America, and made unsuccessful runs for Governor of South Dakota in 1904 and 1906. In addition, he started a socialist newspaper, The Lantern, and his editorials and stories on topics including birth control, labor rights, and labor unions angered mine owners and other business leaders, which resulted in scrutiny by law enforcement agencies and other government officials. In 1908 he was charged with sending obscene material through the mails, and sentenced to a year in prison.

=== Death and burial ===
Knowles died in Deadwood, South Dakota on June 1, 1910. He was buried at Mount Moriah Cemetery in Deadwood.

U.S. House of Representatives
Preceded by Robert J. Gamble	Member of the U.S. House of Representatives from South Dakota's at-large congressional district March 4, 1897 – March 3, 1899	Succeeded by Robert J. Gamble
