= Mildred M. Harris =

American politician

Member of the Boston City Council for Ward 9
- In office 1937–1940
- Preceded by: Richard D. Gleason
- Succeeded by: Daniel F. Sullivan

Personal details
- Died: January 8, 1974 West Roxbury
- Party: Democratic

Mildred M. (Gleason) Harris was an American politician who was the first woman to serve on the Boston City Council.

Harris got her start in politics campaigning for her brothers Richard D. Gleason and John L. Gleason. Her first run for office came in 1936, when she ran to succeed John Gleason in the Massachusetts House of Representatives following his death. During the campaign, Harris was charged with stealing $252 in welfare payments from the city of Everett, Massachusetts. She was found not guilty by directed verdict after her husband pleaded guilty. She finished third in the sixteen candidate Democratic primary. The Gleason vote was split during the election, as Gleason's widow, Mary Gleason, was also a candidate.

In 1937, Richard Gleason died and she ran in the special election for his Ward 9 seat on the Boston City Council. In addition to receiving support from the Gleason political machine, including former rival Mary Gleason, Harris was also backed by African-American political leader Edna Black, who chose to support Harris over African-American candidate Ernest D. Cooke. On March 30, Harris defeated 10 other candidates to become the first woman ever elected to the Boston City Council. She was sworn into office on April 7, 1937. Harris won a full term that fall, defeating her nearest opponent by 680 votes. In 1939, Harris joined eight first-term councilors in blocking the election of James E. Agnew for council president. On September 19, 1939, Harris was critically injured in an automobile accident in Peabody, Massachusetts. Harris suffered a fractured skull and required fifty stitches for cuts on her head, neck, and face, however the car she was driving in was undamaged. By following day, Harris had recovered enough to give a statement to police. She stated that she fell out of the vehicle after accidentally hitting the door handle while putting a blanket on a passenger in the car's back seat. Two of the occupants in the car were charged with drunkenness, including the driver, who was also charged with driving while intoxicated. Harris was defeated for reelection by Daniel F. Sullivan. In 1941, Harris finished sixth in the Boston school committee election. Her political career ended when she left her husband and their six children for a younger man. She died on January 8, 1974, in West Roxbury.
