= Maria Garcia (Arizona politician) =

American politician

Member of the Arizona Senate from the 27th district
- In office November 10, 2010 – January 10, 2011
- Preceded by: Jorge Luis Garcia
- Succeeded by: Olivia Cajero Bedford

Personal details
- Born: Tucson, Arizona
- Party: Democratic
- Spouse: Jorge Luis Garcia (until 2010)

Maria Garcia is an American politician who served as a member of the Arizona State Senate.

== Career ==
In 2010, her husband Jorge Luis Garcia, a state senator died. She was appointed to fill his seat by Governor on November 10, 2010. In 2018, she was a candidate midterm to fill a seat on the Pima Community College Board of Governors. She was elected.
