= Stephen A. D. Greaves =

American politician (1817–1880)

Member of the Mississippi House of Representatives from the Hinds County district
- In office 1854

Personal details
- Born: January 30, 1817 Marion County, South Carolina, US
- Died: November 17, 1880 (aged 63) Madison County, Mississippi, US
- Party: Democrat

Stephen Arne Decatur Greaves Sr. (January 30, 1817 – November 17, 1880) was an American army officer, plantation owner, lawyer, and Democratic politician. He was a member of the Mississippi House of Representatives, representing Hinds County, in 1846.

== Biography ==
Stephen Arne Decatur Greaves was born on January 30, 1817, in Marion County, South Carolina. He served as an officer in the Mexican War, ending his service as a Brigadier General. In 1846, he became a member of the Mississippi House of Representatives, representing Hinds County as a Democrat. After the war, he married Sarah Lowe around 1850 and moved to her 10,000-acre plantation, named "Sunny Place", in Madison County. Before the American Civil War, they owned 600 slaves that worked on the plantation. He died in Madison County, Mississippi, on November 17, 1880, aged 63.

== Personal life and family ==
Greaves married Sarah Anna Frances Lowe. They had several children. Their first child and son, S. A. D. Junior, was born on February 26, 1854. Their second son, William F., was born on June 3, 1856. Another son, John Madison, was born on April 16, 1860. Another son, Clarence Budney, was born on August 22, 1863. Mrs. Greaves died on August 2, 1865. Stephen married Jennie Battley in 1866. On December 13, 1867, they had a son, Harry B.. Stephen, John, Clarence, and Harry would all serve in the Mississippi Legislature.
