= Jason Green (politician) =

American politician

Member-elect of the Missouri House of Representatives from the 116th district
- Assuming office January 6, 2027
- Succeeding: Dale Wright

Personal details
- Party: Republican

Jason Green is an American politician of the Missouri Republican Party who is the representative-elect for the 116th district in the Missouri House of Representatives. He was elected in the 2026 general election. He is a Madison County Commissioner. He was elected alongside his brother Lucas Green in the 146th district.
