= Lucas Green (politician) =

American politician

Member-elect of the Missouri House of Representatives from the 146th district
- Assuming office January 6, 2027
- Succeeding: Barry Hovis

Personal details
- Born: Cape Girardeau, Missouri
- Party: Republican
- Education: University of Missouri; Colorado State University

Lucas Green is an American politician of the Missouri Republican Party who is the representative-elect for the 146th district in the Missouri House of Representatives. He was elected in the 2026 general election. He is a business owner and Army National Guard veteran. He was elected alongside his brother Jason Green in the 116th district.
