= Livingston, Mississippi =

- Unincorporated community
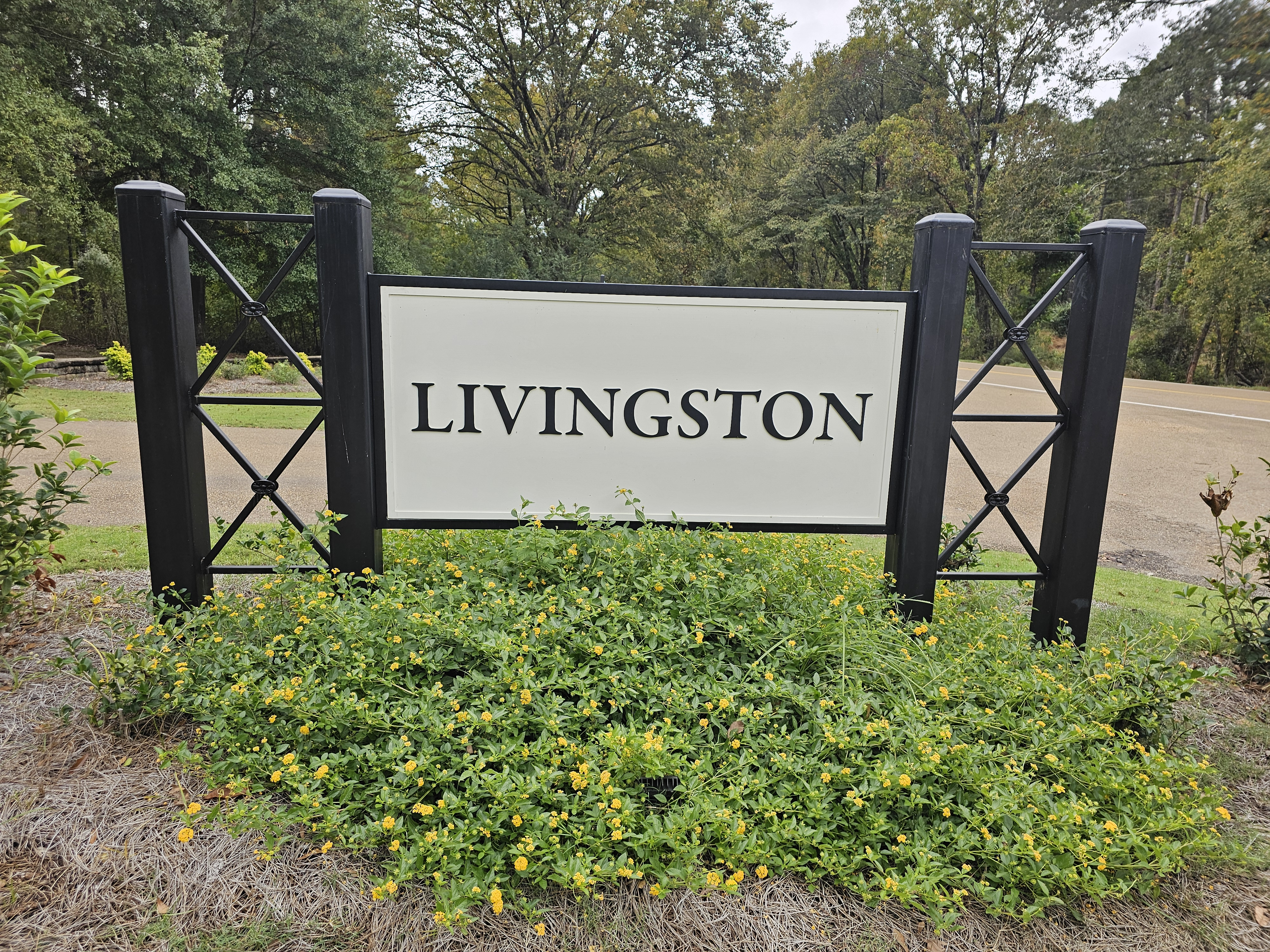
- Sign off of Mississippi Highway 463 in Livingston

- Location within Mississippi Location within the United States
- Coordinates: 32°33′11″N 90°12′58″W
- Country: United States
- State: Mississippi
- County: Madison
- Elevation: 289 ft (88 m)
- Time zone: UTC-6 (Central (CST))
  - Summer (DST): UTC-5 (CDT)
- GNIS feature ID: 672734

Livingston is an unincorporated community located in Madison County, Mississippi, United States.

Once a thriving commercial center, Livingston was nearly deserted by the Civil War. Recent commercial and residential development has revived the lost community.

== History ==
In 1829, the county seat was moved from Beatties Bluff to Livingston. A courthouse and jail were built by 1833, and the town was incorporated in 1836. That same year, the county seat was officially moved to Canton, though Livingston "unofficially" remained the county seat until 1858, because its courthouse continued to be used until that year.

Livingston became an important trading center for nearby plantations.

A Methodist church was established in Livingston around 1830, and there was a Masonic Lodge from 1854 to 1866, when Union forces ransacked and destroyed it.

By the 1850s, railways had been established across the county, and Livingston had been bypassed. Most of the town's residents moved and businesses shut down, though the post office remained until at least 1902. The only remains of the original town are a cemetery, and the foundation of the court square.

=== New development ===
In 2012, a farmers market opened in Livingston, featuring food and entertainment. It became a popular summertime destination, and attracted performers such as country music singer Travis Tritt. Developers began a $73 million construction project in Livingston in 2013, which included an 1800s-style town square, men's barbershop, mercantile store, and office building.

== Notable people ==
- Scott Winfield Bond, businessman
- Clarence B. Greaves, former member of the Mississippi Senate and Mississippi House of Representatives
- Stephen A. D. Greaves Jr., member of the Mississippi House of Representatives from 1908 to 1912, brother of Clarence Greaves
