= Stephen A. D. Greaves Jr. =

Mississippian planter and politician

Member of the Mississippi House of Representatives from the Hinds County district
- In office January 1908 – January 1912

Personal details
- Born: February 26, 1854 Livingston, Mississippi
- Died: December 5, 1915 (aged 61)
- Party: Democrat
- Parent: Stephen A. D. Greaves Sr.

Stephen Arne Douglas Greaves, Jr. (February 26, 1854 - December 5, 1915) was a planter and a Democratic member of the Mississippi House of Representatives, representing Hinds County, from 1908 to 1912.

== Biography ==
Stephen Arne Douglas Greaves, Junior, was born on February 26, 1854, in Livingston, Mississippi. He was the eldest son of brigadier general and state legislator Stephen A. D. Greaves Sr. and Sarah (Lowe) Greaves. His siblings included fellow Mississippi legislators John M. Greaves and Clarence Greaves, his full siblings, and another Mississippi legislator, Harry B. Graves, his half-brother. He attended the public schools of Madison County and attended the Summerville Institute near Shuqualak, Mississippi, from 1872 to 1873. He represented Hinds County in the Mississippi House of Representatives as a Democrat from 1908 to 1912. He died from liver trouble on December 5, 1915.
