= Richard D. Gleason =

American politician (1896–1937)

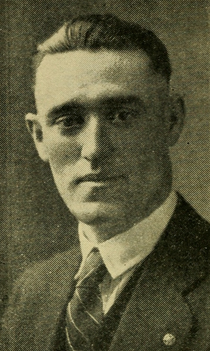

Member of the Boston City Council for Ward 9
- In office 1930–1937
- Preceded by: Michael J. Ward
- Succeeded by: Mildred M. Harris

Member of the Massachusetts House of Representatives for the 9th Suffolk District
- In office 1929–1931

Member of the Massachusetts House of Representatives for the 13th Suffolk District
- In office 1923–1925

Personal details
- Born: September 22, 1896 Roxbury
- Died: January 17, 1937 (aged 40) Roxbury
- Party: Democratic

Richard Daniel Gleason (September 22, 1896 – January 17, 1937) was an American politician who served in the Massachusetts House of Representatives and on the Boston City Council.

== Massachusetts House of Representatives ==
Gleason was born on September 22, 1896, in Roxbury. He was first elected to the Massachusetts House of Representatives in 1922. On December 29, 1923, Gleason, his brother Joseph, and two others were charged with assault and battery on a former political supporter. Gleason was found guilty and sentenced to a month in the House of Correction. Later that year, Gleason and four others were charged with keeping and exposing liquor for sale at the Roxbury Democratic Club. Joseph Gleason pleaded guilty on May 2, 1924, and the charges against Richard Gleason and the three others were dropped. Gleason was defeated for reelection in 1924, but returned to the House in 1929.

== Boston City Council ==
In 1929, Gleason was elected to the Boston City Council. During the 1930 Democratic State Convention, Gleason was ejected by police during a fistfight during a roll call vote. In 1933, the vote for city council president was deadlocked between Joseph McGrath and Joseph Cox. Gleason, who supported McGrath, was wheeled in from Boston City Hospital to cast his vote. However, even with Gleason's support, neither candidate had enough votes to be elected president and both McGrath and Cox agreed to adjourn for the day if Gleason would go back to the hospital. On November 15, 1934, he was found guilty of assaulting a police officer, wanton destruction, and drunkenness and was fined $70. On May 24, 1935, he was removed from the Council chamber after threatening to punch Councilor Albert D. Fish. In the 1935 election Gleason faced an African-American opponent, Ernest D. Cooke. On election day, 100 people, including Gleason, were involved in a race riot started by an argument between Gleason and Cooke supporters. Gleason remained on the council until his death on January 17, 1937. He was succeeded on the council by his sister, Mildred M. Harris.

== See also ==
- 1923–1924 Massachusetts legislature
- 1929–1930 Massachusetts legislature
