= Ralph A. Gamble =

American politician (1885–1959)

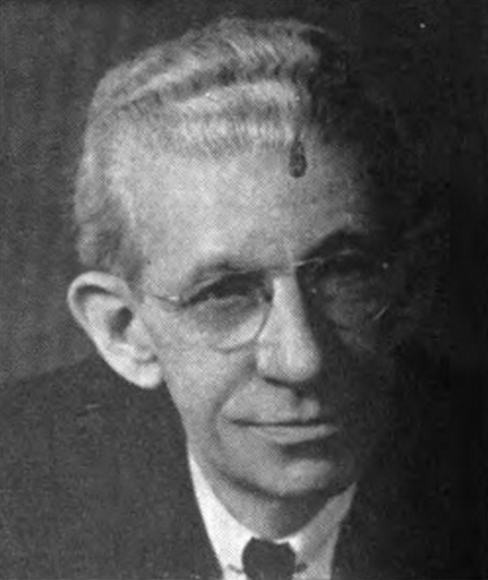

Member of the U.S. House of Representatives from New York
- In office November 2, 1937 – January 3, 1957
- Preceded by: Charles D. Millard
- Succeeded by: Edwin B. Dooley
- Constituency: 25th district (1937–1945); 28th district (1945–1953); 26th district (1953–1957)

Member of the New York State Assembly from the 2nd Westchester District
- In office January 1, 1931 – November 1, 1937
- Preceded by: Herbert B. Shonk
- Succeeded by: Theodore Hill, Jr.

Personal details
- Born: Ralph Abernathy Gamble; May 6, 1885 Yankton, Dakota Territory
- Died: March 4, 1959 (aged 73) Saint Michaels, Maryland, US
- Education: Princeton University; George Washington University Law School; Columbia Law School
- Occupation: politician

Ralph Abernethy Gamble (May 6, 1885 – March 4, 1959) was an American politician who represented Westchester County, New York in the United States House of Representatives from 1937 to 1957. He was a member of the prominent Gamble family of South Dakota.

== Life ==
Gamble was born on May 6, 1885, in Yankton, South Dakota. He graduated from Princeton University in 1909, from George Washington University Law School in 1911, and from Columbia Law School in 1912. He practiced first in New York City, and later in Larchmont. He was counsel for the town of Mamaroneck from 1918 to 1933, and for the Village of Larchmont from 1926-1928.

He was a member of the New York State Assembly (Westchester Co., 2nd D.) in 1931, 1932, 1933, 1934, 1935, 1936 and 1937.

He was elected to Congress in 1937 to fill the vacancy caused by the resignation of Charles D. Millard and served from November 2, 1937, to January 3, 1957. He was chairman of the United States Congress Joint Committee on Housing during the 80th United States Congress. He was one of a small number of House Republicans to support the Lend-Lease Act.

He died on March 4, 1959, in Saint Michaels, Maryland.

== Sources ==
- United States Congress. "Ralph A. Gamble (id: G000031)". Biographical Directory of the United States Congress.

New York State Assembly
Preceded by Herbert B. Shonk	New York State Assembly; Westchester County, 2nd District; 1931–1937	Succeeded by Theodore Hill, Jr.
U.S. House of Representatives
Preceded by Charles D. Millard	Member of the U.S. House of Representatives from New York's 25th congressional district 1937–1945	Succeeded by Charles A. Buckley
Preceded by William T. Byrne	Member of the U.S. House of Representatives from New York's 28th congressional district 1945–1953	Succeeded by Katharine St. George
Preceded by Christopher C. McGrath	Member of the U.S. House of Representatives from New York's 26th congressional district 1953–1957	Succeeded by Edwin B. Dooley
