= Madison County, Mississippi =

County in Mississippi, United States

- County
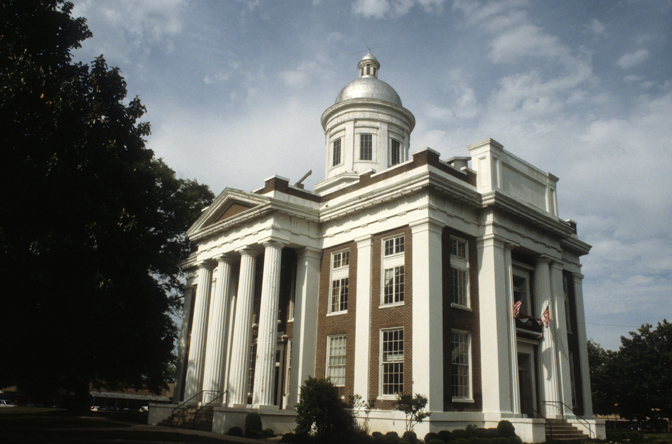
- Madison County Courthouse in Canton

- Location within the U.S. state of Mississippi
- Coordinates: 32°38′N 90°02′W
- Country: United States
- State: Mississippi
- Founded: January 29, 1828
- Named for: James Madison
- Seat: Canton
- Largest city: Madison

Area
  - Total: 742 sq mi (1,920 km^{2})
  - Land: 715 sq mi (1,850 km^{2})
  - Water: 27 sq mi (70 km^{2}) 3.7%

Population (2020)
  - Total: 109,145
  - Estimate (2025): 116,298 ▲
  - Density: 153/sq mi (58.9/km^{2})
- Time zone: UTC−6 (Central)
  - Summer (DST): UTC−5 (CDT)
- Congressional districts: 2nd, 3rd
- Website: www.madison-co.com

Madison County is a county located in the U.S. state of Mississippi. As of the 2020 census, the population was 109,145. The county seat is Canton. The county is named for Founding Father and U.S. President James Madison. Madison County is part of the Jackson, MS Metropolitan Statistical Area.

== Geography ==
According to the U.S. Census Bureau, the county has a total area of 742 square miles (1,920 km^{2}), of which 715 square miles (1,850 km^{2}) is land and 27 square miles (70 km^{2}) (3.7%) is water. The southeastern border of the county is defined by the old course of the Pearl River before it was dammed to create the 33,000 acres (130 km^{2}) Ross Barnett Reservoir.

In 1828 that part of Yazoo County, Mississippi east of the Big Black River (Mississippi) was organized as Madison County.

The boundaries of the county are set in Mississippi Code section 19-1-89 as: Madison County is bounded by beginning at a point on Big Black River, where the same crosses the center line in township twelve, range three, east; thence east to the old Choctaw boundary line; thence north on said boundary line to the center line of township twelve, range five, east; thence through the center of said township twelve, range five, east, to the range line between townships five and six, east; thence south on said range line to Pearl River; thence down said river, with its meanderings, to the line between townships six and seven, north; thence west on said township line to the basis meridian of the Choctaw survey; thence north on said meridian line to the line between townships seven and eight, north; thence west on said township line to the line between ranges two and three, west; thence north on said range line to Big Black River; thence up said river, with its meanderings, to the beginning.

=== Major highways ===
- Interstate 55
- Interstate 220
- U.S. Highway 49
- U.S. Highway 51
- Mississippi Highway 16
- Mississippi Highway 17
- Mississippi Highway 22
- Mississippi Highway 43
- Natchez Trace Parkway

=== Adjacent counties ===
- Attala County (north)
- Leake County (east)
- Scott County (southeast)
- Rankin County (south)
- Hinds County (southwest)
- Yazoo County (west)

=== National protected area ===
- Natchez Trace Parkway (part)

== History ==
Madison County was the site of the Mississippi Slave Insurrection Scare of 1835 at Beatties Bluff.

During the antebellum period, Madison County rapidly developed as a cotton-producing region with a substantial enslaved population. By the time of the 1830 census, the county's population consisted of 2,806 free people and 2,167 enslaved persons. A decade later, the enslaved population had grown to 11,533 - the third-highest total among Mississippi's counties - while 253 people worked in commerce and manufacturing. By 1860, with 77 percent of its residents enslaved, Madison ranked tenth among Mississippi's sixty counties in proportion of enslaved population. The county's soil and labor force were highly productive: Madison ranked third in the state in corn production, fourth in cotton, fifth in Irish potatoes, and first in sweet potatoes.

Following the Civil War, the county's population remained roughly stable, with 19,907 African Americans and 5,946 whites recorded in 1880, and the county continued to rely on a tenant-farming economy. By 1900 the population had grown to 32,493, of whom 25,918 (79 percent) were African American. By 1930, Canton had grown to a town of 3,252 people, but the county continued to have an agricultural economy, with more than 6,000 farms, over 80 percent of them operated by tenant farmers; major crops included cotton, corn, and cattle.

The Civil Rights Movement brought significant activity to Madison County beginning in the 1950s. Voter registration efforts gained momentum when the Congress of Racial Equality, the Student Nonviolent Coordinating Committee, and the Council of Federated Organizations organized boycotts, a Freedom House, and a Freedom School. Activists faced violence during the Freedom Summer of 1964 and again during the 1966 March against Fear. Prominent figures included local businessman C. O. Chinn, whose courage was documented by Anne Moody in Coming of Age in Mississippi, and Canton native Annie Devine, one of the organizers of the Mississippi Freedom Democratic Party.

In the twenty-first century, the county's economy has diversified significantly. The Nissan Vehicle Assembly Plant in Canton began production on May 27, 2003, and as of 2022 employed approximately 5,000 people, having built nearly 5 million vehicles since opening. In 2022 Nissan announced a $500 million retooling of the facility to support electric vehicle production.

In 2017 the ACLU filed a lawsuit (Brown v. Madison County), claiming that black residents were being systematically targeted by the sheriff’s department. In 2019 this led to a consent decree, aimed at preventing unconstitutional policing tactics by the County.

== Demographics ==
Historical population
Census	Pop.	Note	%±
1830	4,973		—
1840	15,530		212.3%
1850	18,173		17.0%
1860	23,382		28.7%
1870	20,948		−10.4%
1880	25,866		23.5%
1890	27,321		5.6%
1900	32,493		18.9%
1910	33,505		3.1%
1920	29,292		−12.6%
1930	35,796		22.2%
1940	37,504		4.8%
1950	33,860		−9.7%
1960	32,904		−2.8%
1970	29,737		−9.6%
1980	41,613		39.9%
1990	53,794		29.3%
2000	74,674		38.8%
2010	95,203		27.5%
2020	109,145		14.6%
2025 (est.)	116,298	▲	6.6%
U.S. Decennial Census; 1790-1960 1900-1990; 1990-2000 2010-2014

=== Racial and ethnic composition ===
Madison County, Mississippi – Racial and ethnic composition Note: the US Census treats Hispanic/Latino as an ethnic category. This table excludes Latinos from the racial categories and assigns them to a separate category. Hispanics/Latinos may be of any race.
Race / Ethnicity (NH = Non-Hispanic)	Pop 1980	Pop 1990	Pop 2000	Pop 2010	Pop 2020	% 1980	% 1990	% 2000	% 2010	% 2020
White alone (NH)	18,179	29,635	44,613	53,287	60,273	43.69%	55.09%	59.74%	55.97%	55.22%
Black or African American alone (NH)	22,935	23,656	27,897	36,227	38,526	55.11%	43.98%	37.36%	38.05%	35.30%
Native American or Alaska Native alone (NH)	11	40	82	124	160	0.03%	0.07%	0.11%	0.13%	0.15%
Asian alone (NH)	59	182	965	2,029	3,167	0.14%	0.34%	1.29%	2.13%	2.90%
Native Hawaiian or Pacific Islander alone (NH)	x	x	15	18	13	x	x	0.02%	0.02%	0.01%
Other race alone (NH)	38	5	26	70	300	0.09%	0.01%	0.03%	0.07%	0.27%
Mixed race or Multiracial (NH)	x	x	334	642	2,589	x	x	0.45%	0.67%	2.37%
Hispanic or Latino (any race)	391	276	742	2,806	4,117	0.94%	0.51%	0.99%	2.95%	3.77%
Total	41,613	53,794	74,674	95,203	109,145	100.00%	100.00%	100.00%	100.00%	100.00%

=== 2020 census ===
As of the 2020 census, the county had a population of 109,145. The median age was 39.4 years. 24.0% of residents were under the age of 18 and 16.4% of residents were 65 years of age or older. For every 100 females there were 91.3 males, and for every 100 females age 18 and over there were 87.4 males age 18 and over.

The racial makeup of the county was 55.7% White, 35.4% Black or African American, 0.3% American Indian and Alaska Native, 2.9% Asian, <0.1% Native Hawaiian and Pacific Islander, 2.4% from some other race, and 3.3% from two or more races. Hispanic or Latino residents of any race comprised 3.8% of the population.

74.2% of residents lived in urban areas, while 25.8% lived in rural areas.

There were 41,980 households in the county, of which 33.8% had children under the age of 18 living in them. Of all households, 49.6% were married-couple households, 16.7% were households with a male householder and no spouse or partner present, and 29.9% were households with a female householder and no spouse or partner present. About 27.8% of all households were made up of individuals and 10.6% had someone living alone who was 65 years of age or older.

There were 46,033 housing units, of which 8.8% were vacant. Among occupied housing units, 74.6% were owner-occupied and 25.4% were renter-occupied. The homeowner vacancy rate was 1.8% and the rental vacancy rate was 14.4%.

=== 2000 census ===
As of the census of 2000, there were 74,674 people, 27,219 households, and 19,325 families residing in the county. The population density was 104 inhabitants per square mile (40/km^{2}). There were 28,781 housing units at an average density of 40 per square mile (15/km^{2}). The racial makeup of the county was 60.29% White, 37.48% Black or African American, 0.11% Native American, 1.30% Asian, 0.02% Pacific Islander, 0.27% from other races, and 0.53% from two or more races. 0.99% of the population were Hispanic or Latino of any race.

There were 27,219 households, out of which 37.40% had children under the age of 18 living with them, 51.90% were married couples living together, 15.60% had a female householder with no husband present, and 29.00% were non-families. 25.00% of all households were made up of individuals, and 6.70% had someone living alone who was 65 years of age or older. The average household size was 2.67 and the average family size was 3.23.

In the county, the population was spread out, with 28.60% under the age of 18, 8.90% from 18 to 24, 32.40% from 25 to 44, 20.30% from 45 to 64, and 9.70% who were 65 years of age or older. The median age was 33 years. For every 100 females, there were 90.20 males. For every 100 females age 18 and over, there were 86.20 males.

The median income for a household in the county was $46,970, and the median income for a family was $58,172. Males had a median income of $41,460 versus $29,170 for females. The per capita income for the county was $23,469. About 10.60% of families and 14.00% of the population were below the poverty line, including 21.30% of those under age 18 and 13.20% of those age 65 or over.

Madison County has the highest per capita income in the State of Mississippi. It is the only county in Mississippi with a per capita income higher than the national average.

== Communities ==
=== Cities ===
- Canton (county seat)
- Gluckstadt
- Jackson (mostly in Hinds County, also in Rankin County)
- Madison
- Ridgeland

=== Town ===
- Flora

=== Census-designated place ===
- Kearney Park

=== Other unincorporated communities ===
- Camden
- Farmhaven
- Livingston
- Sharon
- Vernon
- Way

=== Ghost town ===
- Beatties Bluff

== Politics ==
Madison County is a Republican leaning county although Democrats do respectably well by receiving over 40% of the vote. The last Democrat to win the county was Jimmy Carter in 1980.

United States presidential election results for Madison County, Mississippi
Year	Republican		Democratic		Third party(ies)	
Year	No.	%	No.	%	No.	%
1912	11	1.50%	663	90.45%	59	8.05%
1916	36	4.29%	782	93.10%	22	2.62%
1920	57	6.36%	831	92.75%	8	0.89%
1924	109	6.39%	1,598	93.61%	0	0.00%
1928	124	7.55%	1,519	92.45%	0	0.00%
1932	51	3.33%	1,474	96.15%	8	0.52%
1936	32	1.71%	1,838	98.24%	1	0.05%
1940	66	3.14%	2,038	96.86%	0	0.00%
1944	104	5.14%	1,921	94.86%	0	0.00%
1948	51	2.60%	81	4.12%	1,833	93.28%
1952	1,496	51.22%	1,425	48.78%	0	0.00%
1956	377	15.74%	996	41.59%	1,022	42.67%
1960	525	18.35%	753	26.32%	1,583	55.33%
1964	3,283	92.90%	251	7.10%	0	0.00%
1968	876	9.26%	4,515	47.72%	4,071	43.02%
1972	5,047	57.20%	3,464	39.26%	313	3.55%
1976	4,838	42.75%	6,240	55.14%	238	2.10%
1980	6,024	42.91%	7,621	54.28%	394	2.81%
1984	9,298	53.24%	8,002	45.82%	163	0.93%
1988	11,399	57.50%	8,242	41.57%	184	0.93%
1992	12,810	54.00%	9,386	39.57%	1,525	6.43%
1996	14,467	58.60%	9,354	37.89%	867	3.51%
2000	19,109	64.00%	10,416	34.88%	334	1.12%
2004	24,257	64.30%	13,268	35.17%	199	0.53%
2008	27,203	57.55%	19,831	41.95%	235	0.50%
2012	28,507	57.51%	20,722	41.80%	342	0.69%
2016	28,265	56.75%	20,343	40.85%	1,194	2.40%
2020	31,091	55.31%	24,440	43.48%	681	1.21%
2024	32,333	58.04%	22,700	40.75%	677	1.22%

== Education ==
There are two school districts: Madison County School District and Canton Public School District.

Private schools:

- Canton Academy
- Madison-Ridgeland Academy
- St. Andrew's Episcopal School (Secondary school campus)
- St. Joseph Catholic School (of the Roman Catholic Diocese of Jackson)
- Veritas School (CLOSED)

The local community college is Holmes Community College.

Tougaloo College is in Madison County.

== See also ==
- National Register of Historic Places listings in Madison County, Mississippi
- Disappearance of Myra Lewis, a child who went missing from Madison County in 2014
