= 2026 in South Dakota =

- Decades: 2000s; 2010s; 2020s
- See also: History of South Dakota; Historical outline of South Dakota; List of years in South Dakota; 2026 in the United States

The following is a list of events of the year 2026 in South Dakota.

== Incumbents ==
=== State government ===
- Governor: Larry Rhoden (R)

== Events ==
- June 2 – Primaries are held for multiple elections in the state.
- June 23 – State Senator Tom Pischke (R-Dell Rapids) is arrested and accused of falsifying signatures to put candidates for state party positions without them knowing. He is charged with knowingly submitting a falsified or forged document.
- July 17 – A federal judge rules South Dakota cannot enforce a law that bans advertising of abortion services like pills.
- November 3:
  - 2026 South Dakota Amendment L
  - 2026 South Dakota House of Representatives election
  - 2026 South Dakota Senate election
  - 2026 South Dakota Attorney General election
  - 2026 South Dakota gubernatorial election: Larry Rhoden wins reelection.
  - 2026 South Dakota Secretary of State election
  - 2026 United States House of Representatives election in South Dakota: Marty Jackley wins the election.
  - 2026 United States Senate election in South Dakota: Mike Rounds wins reelection.

== See also ==
- 2026 in the United States
