= Trail of Governors =

Series of bronze statues in South Dakota

Statue of Arthur C. Mellette, the first Governor of South Dakota and the first statue to be placed on the Trail of Governors

The Trail of Governors is a series of life-size bronze statues of former governors of South Dakota in Pierre, the state capital. After installing its first statues in 2012, the project completed its goal of placing statues of every former governor ten years later with the 2022 unveiling. Beginning with Kristi Noem, governors are added after they leave office. Sculptors who have created statues for the project include John Lopez, James Van Nuys, James Michael Maher, Lee Leuning and Sherry Treeby.

Statues have been added to the trail since 2012:

- 2012: The trail's first statues portrayed Arthur C. Mellette, Harlan J. Bushfield and Walter Dale Miller.
- 2013: Statues were added of Frank Farrar, Harvey L. Wollman and William J. Janklow.
- 2014: In conjunction with celebrations of the South Dakota's 125th anniversary of statehood, the trail added statues of Robert S. Vessey, Peter Norbeck and George S. Mickelson.
- 2015: New statues were added portraying Charles N. Herreid, George T. Mickelson and Richard F. Kneip.
- 2016: The trail added statues of Warren E. Green, Nils Boe and M. Michael Rounds.
- 2017: Four statues were added to the trail, portraying Tom Berry, Leslie Jensen, Sigurd Anderson and Joe Foss.
- 2018: Statues of William H. McMaster, Merrell Q. Sharpe and Ralph Herseth were added to the trail.
- 2019: The trail added statues of Samuel H. Elrod, Archie M. Gubbrud and Dennis Daugaard.
- 2021: Statues of Charles H. Sheldon, Coe I. Crawford and Carl Gunderson were unveiled, following a one-year delay due to the COVID-19 pandemic.
- 2022: The trail completed its initial placement of statues, adding Andrew E. Lee, Frank M. Byrne and William J. Bulow.
- 2026: A statue of Kristi Noem was unveiled. It features her with one of her horses, "Ice Man."
