= 1889 in South Dakota =

- Decades: 1880s; 1890s; 1900s
- See also: History of South Dakota; Historical outline of South Dakota; List of years in South Dakota; 1889 in the United States

The following is a list of events of the year 1889 in South Dakota.

== Incumbents ==
=== State government ===
- Governor: Arthur C. Mellette (R) (starting November 2)

== Events ==
- November 2 – The Dakota Territory is admitted to the union of the United States, with South Dakota becoming the 40th U.S state.
- October 1 – 1889 South Dakota gubernatorial election.
- November 2 – Arthur C. Mellette wins the gubernatorial election, becoming the first governor of South Dakota.

== See also ==
- 1889 in the United States
