= 1900 South Dakota gubernatorial election =

- November 6, 1900
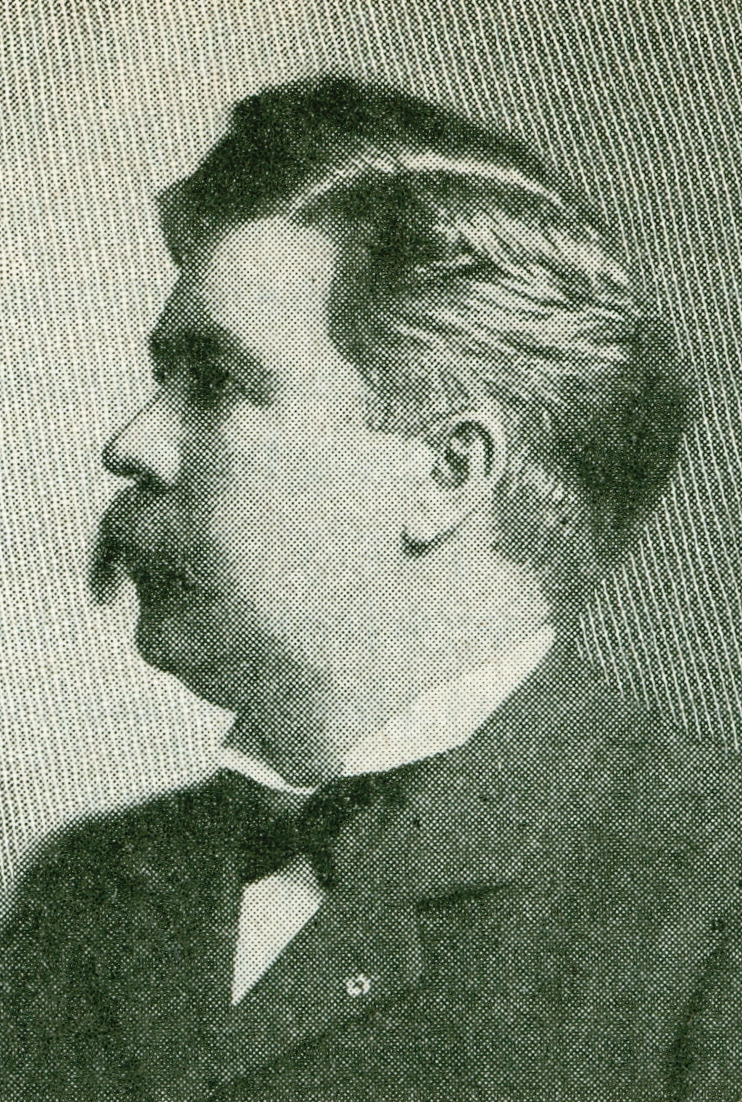

Nominee	Charles N. Herreid	Burre H. Lien
Party	Republican	Fusion
Popular vote	53,803	40,091
Percentage	56.31%	41.96%
- County results Herreid: 40–50% 50–60% 60–70% 70–80% Lien: 40–50% 50–60% No Vote
Governor of South Dakota before election
Andrew E. Lee
Populist
Elected Governor of South Dakota
Charles N. Herreid
Republican

The 1900 South Dakota gubernatorial election was held on November 6, 1900. Incumbent Governor Andrew E. Lee, a Populist elected under Fusion with Populists, Free Silver Republicans, and Democrats, opted to run for Congress rather than for a third term. Former Sioux Falls Mayor Burre H. Lien won the Fusion nomination and ran against former Lieutenant Governor Charles N. Herreid. However, despite the closeness of the 1896 and 1898 elections, the Fusion's luck ran out; Herreid defeated Lien in a landslide to reclaim the office for the Republican Party.

== Republican convention ==
Several months prior to the Republican convention in Sioux Falls on May 24, 1900, former Lieutenant Governor Charles N. Herreid, who had previously sought the Republican nomination for Governor in 1896, announced that he would run for governor. No serious challengers emerged, and he was seen as the likely frontrunner. At the convention, he was nominated unanimously.

== Fusion conventions ==
At the Fusion convention in Yankton, former Sioux Falls Mayor Burre H. Lien and Railroad Commissioner W. T. LaFollette were mentioned as the leading candidates, though some delegates suspected that Governor Lee might be renominated for a third term, breaking "the unwritten law of the political parties of South Dakota." LaFollette's unpopularity led to his chances shrinking at the convention, and the momentum favored Lien; Lee, meanwhile, was floated as a Fusion candidate for Congress. Ultimately, Lien was nominated for Governor and Lee for Congress, which was ratified by the Populist and Democratic conventions.

== General election ==
=== Results ===
1900 South Dakota gubernatorial special election
Party	Candidate	Votes	%	±%
Republican	Charles N. Herreid	53,803	56.31%	+7.15%
Fusion	Burre H. Lien	40,091	41.96%	−7.69%
Prohibition	F. J. Carlisle	1,331	1.39%	+0.21%
Populist	L. E. Stair	316	0.33%	—
Majority		13,712	14.35%	+13.86%
Turnout		95,541	100.00%	
Republican gain from Fusion				
