= Lieutenant Governor of South Dakota =

Official in the U.S state of South Dakota

- Seal of South Dakota

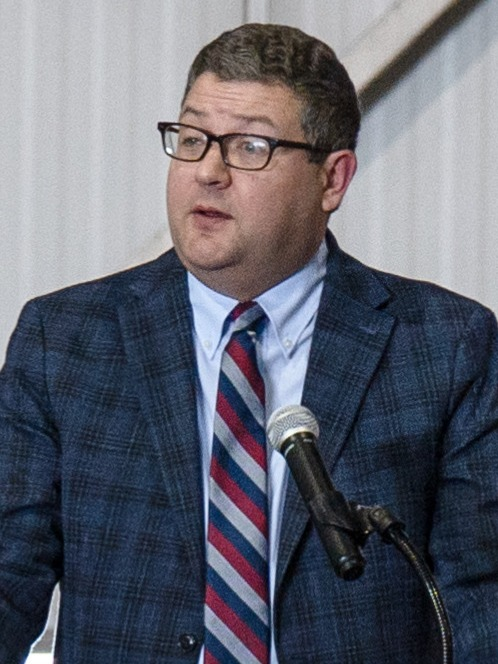
- Incumbent; Tony Venhuizen since January 30, 2025
- Style: The Honorable
- Term length: 4 years, renewable once, same election with The governor's Ticket
- Inaugural holder: James H. Fletcher, 1889
- Formation: Constitution of South Dakota
- Salary: $112,885.76
- Website: Governor's Website

The lieutenant governor of South Dakota is the second-ranking member of the executive branch of South Dakota state government and also serves as presiding officer of the South Dakota Senate. The lieutenant governor succeeds to the governorship if the office becomes vacant, and may also serve as acting governor if the governor is incapacitated or absent from the state.

Since 1974, the lieutenant governor has been elected on a ticket with the governor. Seven lieutenant governors have gone on to be elected governor in their own right: Charles N. Herreid (1900 & 1902), Frank M. Byrne (1912 & 1914), Peter Norbeck (1916 & 1918), William H. McMaster (1920 & 1922), Carl Gunderson (1924), Nils Boe (1964 & 1966) and Dennis Daugaard (2010 & 2014). Three others succeeded to the office of governor: Harvey L. Wollman, Walter Dale Miller, and Larry Rhoden.

The current lieutenant governor is Tony Venhuizen, since 30 January 2025.

== List of lieutenant governors ==
Parties

Democratic (6) Republican (34)

No.	Image	Lt. Governor	Party	From	To	Governor(s) served under
1		James H. Fletcher	Republican	1889	1891	Arthur C. Mellette
2		George H. Hoffman	Republican	1891	1893	Arthur C. Mellette
3		Charles N. Herreid	Republican	1893	1897	Charles H. Sheldon
4		Daniel T. Hindman	Republican	1897	1899	Andrew E. Lee
5		John T. Kean	Republican	1899	1901	Andrew E. Lee
6		George W. Snow	Republican	1901	1905	Charles N. Herreid
7		John E. McDougall	Republican	1905	1907	Samuel H. Elrod
8		Howard C. Shober	Republican	1907	1911	Coe I. Crawford; Robert S. Vessey
9		Frank M. Byrne	Republican	1911	1913	Robert S. Vessey
10		Edward Lincoln Abel	Republican	1913	1915	Frank M. Byrne
11		Peter Norbeck	Republican	1915	1917	Frank M. Byrne
12		William H. McMaster	Republican	1917	1921	Peter Norbeck
13		Carl Gunderson	Republican	1921	1925	William H. McMaster
14		Alva Clark Forney	Republican	1925	1927	Carl Gunderson
15		Hyatt E. Covey	Republican	1927	1929	William J. Bulow
16		Clarence E. Coyne	Republican	1929	1929	William J. Bulow
17		John T. Grigsby	Democratic	1929	1931	William J. Bulow
18		Odell K. Whitney	Republican	1931	1933	Warren Green
19		Hans Ustrud	Democratic	1933	1935	Tom Berry
20		Robert Peterson	Democratic	1935	1937	Tom Berry
21		Donald McMurchie	Republican	1937	1941	Leslie Jensen; Harlan J. Bushfield
22		Albert C. Miller	Republican	1941	1945	Harlan J. Bushfield; Merrill Q. Sharpe
23		Sioux K. Grigsby	Republican	1945	1949	Merrill Q. Sharpe; George T. Mickelson
24		Rex A. Terry	Republican	1949	1955	George T. Mickelson; Sigurd Anderson
25		L. Roy Houck	Republican	1955	1959	Joe Foss
26		John F. Lindley	Democratic	1959	1961	Ralph Herseth
27		Joseph H. Bottum	Republican	1961	1962	Archie M. Gubbrud
28		Nils Boe	Republican	1963	1965	Archie M. Gubbrud
29		Lem Overpeck	Republican	1965	1969	Nils Boe
30		James Abdnor	Republican	1969	1971	Frank Farrar
31		William Dougherty	Democratic	1971	1975	Richard Kneip
32		Harvey L. Wollman	Democratic	1975	1978	Richard Kneip
33		Lowell C. Hansen II	Republican	1979	1987	Bill Janklow
34		Walter Dale Miller	Republican	1987	1993	George S. Mickelson
35		Steve T. Kirby	Republican	1993	1995	Walter Dale Miller
36		Carole Hillard	Republican	1995	2003	Bill Janklow
37		Dennis Daugaard	Republican	2003	2011	Mike Rounds
38		Matt Michels	Republican	2011	2019	Dennis Daugaard
39		Larry Rhoden	Republican	2019	2025	Kristi Noem
40		Tony Venhuizen	Republican	2025	Incumbent	Larry Rhoden

== See also ==
- Lieutenant governor (United States) (generally)
