= 1902 South Dakota gubernatorial election =

- November 4, 1902
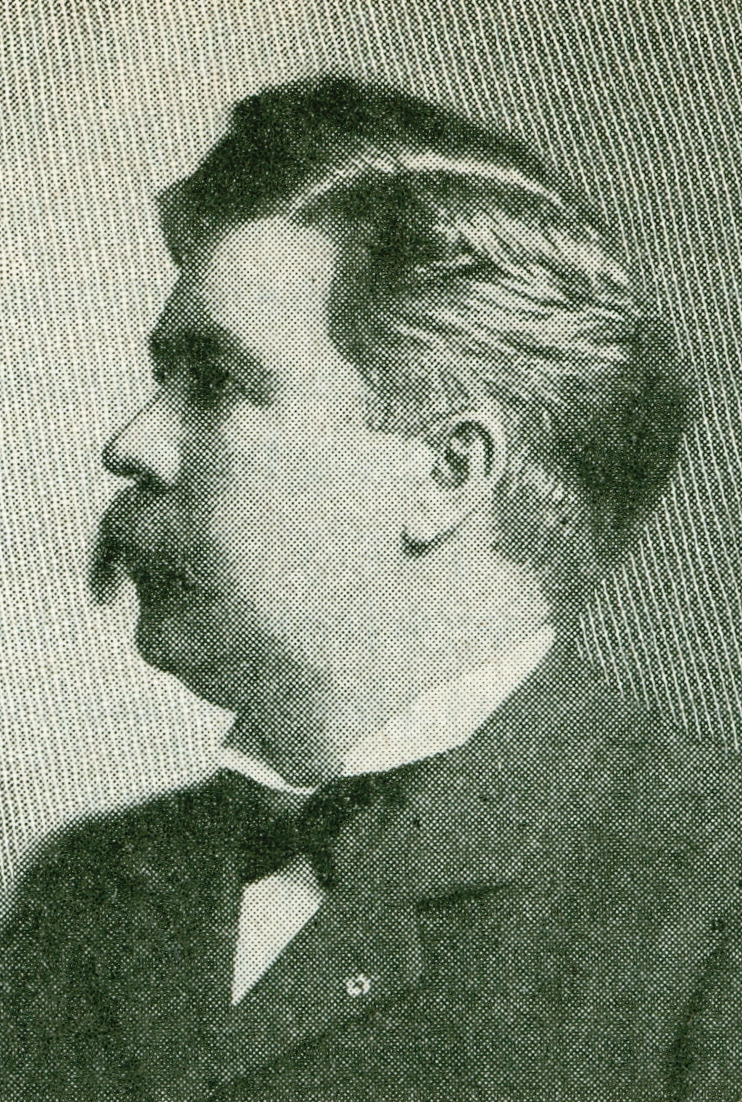

| Nominee | Charles N. Herreid | John W. Martin |
| Party | Republican | Democratic |
| Popular vote | 48,196 | 21,396 |
| Percentage | 64.73% | 28.74% |
- County results Herreid: 40–50% 50–60% 60–70% 70–80% 80–90% Martin: 40–50% No Vote
Governor of South Dakota before election
Charles N. Herreid
Republican
Elected Governor of South Dakota
Charles N. Herreid
Republican

The 1902 South Dakota gubernatorial election was held on November 4, 1902. Incumbent Republican Governor Charles N. Herreid ran for re-election to a second term. He faced former Watertown Mayor John W. Martin, the Fusion nominee who was listed as the Democratic nominee, in the general election. Herreid defeated Martin in a landslide to win his second term.

== Republican convention ==
At the Republican convention in June 1902, Governor Charles N. Herreid was renominated unanimously and without opposition.

== Fusion conventions ==
As was the case in 1898 and 1900, the Democratic and Populist Parties held separate conventions and then fused together with a common set of nominees. However, this time, the parties agreed that the ticket, though fused, would be listed as the Democratic Party on the ballot. At the conventions, former Watertown Mayor John W. Martin was named as the Fusion nominee.

== General election ==
=== Results ===
1902 South Dakota gubernatorial special election
| Party | Candidate | Votes | % | ±% |
|---|---|---|---|---|
| Republican | Charles N. Herreid (inc.) | 48,196 | 64.73% | +8.42% |
| Democratic | John W. Martin | 21,396 | 28.74% | −13.23% |
| Socialist | John C. Crawford | 2,620 | 3.52% | — |
| Prohibition | H. H. Curtis | 2,245 | 3.02% | +2.68% |
| Majority | | 26,800 | 35.99% | +21.64% |
| Turnout | | 74,457 | 100.00% | |
| Republican hold | | | | |
