= Mellette =

Mellette may refer to:

- Mellette, South Dakota
- Mellette County, South Dakota
- Mellette House, Watertown, South Dakota
- USS Mellette (APA-156)

== People with the surname ==
- Aaron Mellette (born 1989), American football player
- Arthur C. Mellette (1842–1896), American politician
