= 1894 South Dakota gubernatorial election =

- November 6, 1894
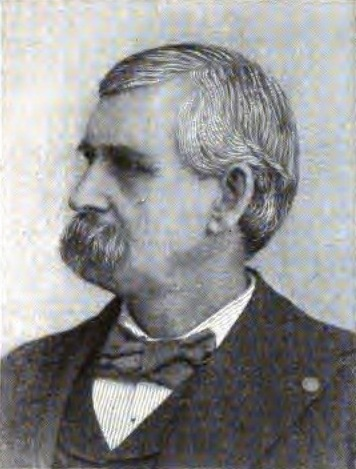

Nominee	Charles H. Sheldon	Isaac Howe	James A. Ward
Party	Republican	Populist	Democratic
Popular vote	40,381	26,568	8,756
Percentage	52.64%	34.63%	11.41%
- County results Sheldon: 30–40% 40–50% 50–60% 60–70% 70–80% Howe: 40–50% 50–60% 60–70% No Vote
Governor of South Dakota before election
Charles H. Sheldon
Republican
Elected Governor of South Dakota
Charles H. Sheldon
Republican

The 1894 South Dakota gubernatorial election was held on November 6, 1894. Incumbent Republican Governor Charles H. Sheldon ran for re-election to a second term. Despite facing a thread of defeat at the Republican convention, Sheldon was renominated unanimously. In the general election, he faced Populist nominee Isaac Howe, a Spink County Judge; James A. Ward, the former state chairman of the South Dakota Democratic Party; and Prohibition nominee M. D. Alexander. The election was largely a replay of the gubernatorial elections of 1890 and 1892, with the Farmers' Alliance candidate placing second and the Democratic nominee placing a distant third. This time, however, Sheldon won an outright majority and the Democratic Party's vote share shrank to just 11%, its worst performance in state history.

== Populist Party convention ==
By 1894, the Independent Party, which had formed out of the South Dakota Farmers' Alliance, began to affiliate itself with the Populist Party. In the lead-up to its June 1894 convention, several names were mentioned as likely gubernatorial candidates: former State Representative Robert Buchanan, an erstwhile Republican; Spink County Judge Isaac Howe; and Sioux Falls University President E. B. Meredith, a prohibitionist.

As the convention began on June 13, 1894, Buchanan, who had previously rejected entreaties to run for governor, acceded and became a candidate. At this point, Meredith faded from contention and supported Buchanan over Howe. The contest between Howe and Buchanan became a proxy battle between Henry L. Loucks, a longtime leader of the Farmers' Alliance, and Buchanan, and despite Howe supporters' hope that he would be nominated by acclamation, Buchanan took an early lead. The next day, however, it appeared that Buchanan had lost his early lead, and Howe was overwhelmingly nominated.

== Republican convention ==
At the Republican convention in August 1894, Governor Sheldon faced a threat of losing renomination, but the forces opposed to him were unable to recruit a challenger to him. Accordingly, he was renominated unopposed.

== Democratic convention ==
The Democratic convention convened in Sioux Falls in September 1894, three candidates were mentioned as likely contenders for Governor: Samuel A. Ramsey, the 1892 Democratic nominee for Lieutenant Governor; L. G. Oschenreiter, the President of the South Dakota World's Fair Commission; and Court Boyd. At the convention, however, though Ramsey was nominated for governor, he withdrew in favor of James A. Ward, the state party chairman, who was nominated by acclamation.

== General election ==
=== Results ===
1894 South Dakota gubernatorial special election
Party	Candidate	Votes	%	±%
Republican	Charles H. Sheldon (inc.)	40,381	52.64%	+5.18%
Independent Party	Isaac Howe	26,568	34.63%	+2.64%
Democratic	James A. Ward	8,756	11.41%	−9.14%
Prohibition	M. D. Alexander	1,011	1.32%	—
Majority		13,813	18.01%	+2.54%
Turnout		70,410	100.00%	
Republican hold				
