= 1892 South Dakota gubernatorial election =

- November 8, 1892
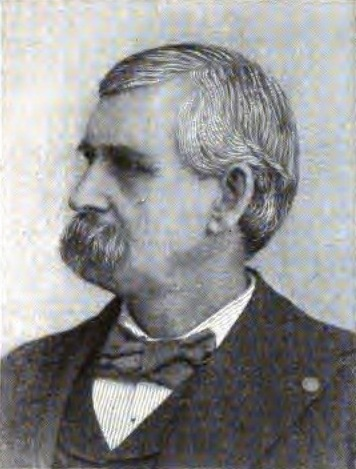

| Nominee | Charles H. Sheldon | Abraham Lincoln Van Osdel | Peter Couchman |
| Party | Republican | Independent Party | Democratic |
| Popular vote | 33,414 | 22,524 | 14,472 |
| Percentage | 47.46% | 31.99% | 20.55% |
- County results Sheldon: 30–40% 40–50% 50–60% 60–70% Van Osdel: 30–40% 40–50% Couchman: 30–40% No Vote
Governor of South Dakota before election
Arthur C. Mellette
Republican
Elected Governor of South Dakota
Charles H. Sheldon
Republican

The 1892 South Dakota gubernatorial election was held on November 8, 1892. Incumbent Republican governor Arthur C. Mellette declined to seek re-election to a third term. Former territorial legislator Charles H. Sheldon was nominated by the Republican Party as Mellette's replacement, and he faced former legislator Abraham Lincoln Van Osdel, a leader in the South Dakota Farmers' Alliance and the nominee of the Independent Party, along with Democratic nominee Peter Couchman, in the general election. The result was largely a replay of the 1890 election, with Sheldon winning by a large margin, but only a plurality, and Van Osdel taking second place over Couchman.

== Independent Party convention ==
Following the split vote in the 1890 election, some members of the Independent Party pushed for a fusion with the Democratic Party. However, in the lead-up to the June 1892 convention, Independent leaders and convention delegates made clear that they were strongly opposed to fusion and would nominate their own candidates. Their 1890 gubernatorial nominee, Henry L. Loucks, was initially seen as the frontrunner for the nomination, but former territorial delegate Abraham Lincoln Van Osdel, who was the Party's 1890 lieutenant-gubernatorial nominee, emerged as the nominee.

== Republican convention ==
At the Republican convention in July 1892, Governor Mellette declined to be a candidate for another term. To replace him, a crowded field developed:

- A. E. Clough, Chairman of the Republican Party of South Dakota
- John P. Davis, State Representative from Kingsbury County
- Robert Dollard, Attorney General
- George H. Hoffman, Lieutenant Governor
- Edward T. Sheldon, former State Representative from Hand County
- Charles H. Sheldon, former territorial legislator
- L. C. Taylor, State Auditor
- Seth T. Winslow, State Representative from Sanborn County

However, before a formal ballot could be taken, the delegates agreed on nominating Charles H. Sheldon for Governor, and he received the nomination by acclamation.

== Democratic convention ==
Just as the Independent Party rejected the idea of fusion, so too did the Democratic Party. At their September 1890 convention, the delegates overwhelmingly voted, 376–36, against forming a coalition and to instead nominate their own candidates for state offices. The convention nominated Peter Couchman, a former member of the New York State Assembly who moved to South Dakota in 1872 and ran as the 1890 Democratic nominee for Lieutenant Governor, by acclamation.

== General election ==
=== Results ===
1892 South Dakota gubernatorial special election
| Party | Candidate | Votes | % | ±% |
|---|---|---|---|---|
| Republican | Charles H. Sheldon | 33,414 | 47.46% | +2.99% |
| Independent Party | Abraham Lincoln Van Osdel | 22,524 | 31.99% | +0.28% |
| Democratic | Peter Couchman | 14,472 | 20.55% | −3.28% |
| Majority | | 10,890 | 15.47% | +2.71% |
| Turnout | | 70,410 | 100.00% | |
| Republican hold | | | | |
