= 2022 in South Dakota =

- Decades: 2000s; 2010s; 2020s
- See also: History of South Dakota; Historical outline of South Dakota; List of years in South Dakota; 2022 in the United States

The following is a list of events of the year 2022 in South Dakota.

== Incumbents ==
=== State government ===
- Governor:Kristi Noem (R)

== Events ==
- January 27 – Sioux Falls City FC is founded in the Women's Premier Soccer League.
- June 21 – The South Dakota Senate votes to convict Attorney General Jason Ravnsborg over his role in a 2020 car accident in which his car struck 55-year old Joseph Boever, removing him from office immediately.
- August 1 – More than two million people are under red flag warnings in the United States as wildfires continue to spread across various states, including South Dakota.
- The Expedition League collegiate summer baseball league ceases operations.

== See also ==
- 2022 in the United States
