= Senator McDougall (disambiguation) =

James A. McDougall (1817–1867) was a U.S. Senator from California from 1861 to 1867. Senator McDougall may also refer to:

- Alexander McDougall (1732–1786), New York State Senate
- John E. McDougall (1860–1932), South Dakota State Senate

== See also ==
- Ryan McDougle (born 1971), Virginia State Senate
