= Indigenous peoples of South Dakota =

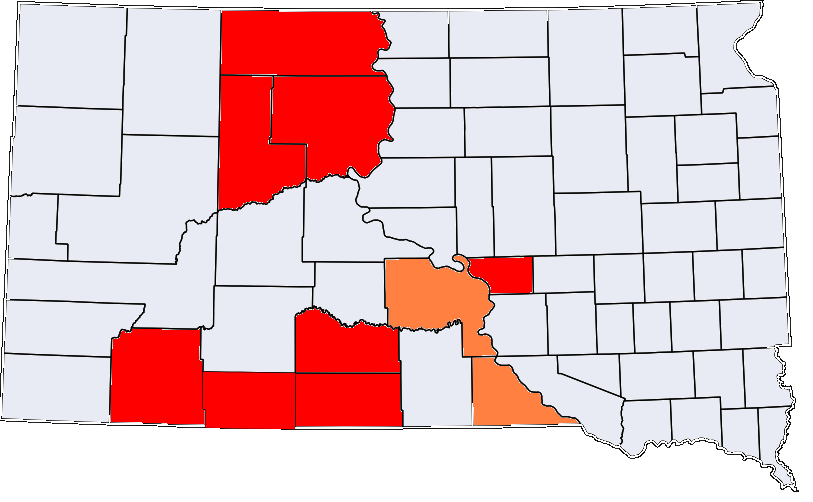

Total population
- 11.1% (2020)

Languages
- Native American languages, American Indian English

Religion
- Native American religion, Native American Church

Prior to the arrival of white settlers in Dakota area, numerous Native American tribes inhabited South Dakota. This included ancient groups like the Mound Builders, in addition to historically recognized tribes such as the Crow, Kiowa, Omaha, Ponca, Arikara, and Mandan.

== Crime ==
Native American women in South Dakota face higher rates of involvement in sex trafficking and prostitution compared to other groups. Drug problems and gang activity are real issues that exist on Native American reservations throughout South Dakota. A lot of Native Americans living in the state struggle with illicit drug use as well.

== See also ==
- History of South Dakota
