= 2021 in South Dakota =

- Decades: 2000s; 2010s; 2020s
- See also: History of South Dakota; Historical outline of South Dakota; List of years in South Dakota; 2021 in the United States

The following is a list of events of the year 2021 in South Dakota.

== Incumbents ==
=== State government ===
- Governor:Kristi Noem (R)

== Events ==
Ongoing: COVID-19 pandemic in South Dakota

- The Dacotah Bank Stadium is completed in Aberdeen.
- The Rapid City Marshals indoor football team are established in Rapid City.
- May – The Ringneck and Western Railroad opens.
- May 31 – South Dakota Veterans Cemetery opens in Sioux Falls.

== See also ==
- 2021 in the United States
