= Senator Shober =

Senator Shober may refer to:

- Francis Edwin Shober (1831–1896), North Carolina State Senate
- Howard C. Shober (1859–1956), South Dakota State Senate
