= 1898 South Dakota gubernatorial election =

- November 8, 1898
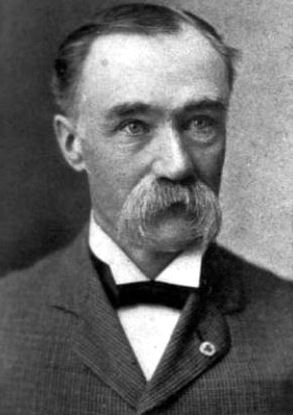

| Nominee | Andrew E. Lee | Kirk G. Phillips |
| Party | Fusion | Republican |
| Popular vote | 37,319 | 36,949 |
| Percentage | 49.65% | 49.16% |
- County results Lee: 40–50% 50–60% 60–70% Phillips: 40–50% 50–60% 60–70% 70–80% No Vote
Governor of South Dakota before election
Andrew E. Lee
Populist
Elected Governor of South Dakota
Andrew E. Lee
Fusion

The 1898 South Dakota gubernatorial election was held on November 8, 1898. Incumbent governor Andrew E. Lee, elected in 1896 as a Populist, he ran for re-election as a Fusion candidate. He was challenged by Republican nominee Kirk G. Phillips, the state treasurer. Lee narrowly defeated Phillips to win his second term as governor, but most of his Fusion allies lost their elections, leaving him as the lone statewide officeholder.

== Fusion conventions ==
Prior to the separate conventions of the Democrats, Populists, and Free Silver Republicans, U.S. Senator Richard F. Pettigrew worked behind the scenes to continue the coalition's success. To ensure that anti-silver Democrats didn't bolt from the coalition, he convinced the three parties that the Democrats should be granted four positions on the statewide ticket, which the parties embraced. In the end, the nominations were divvied up among the three parties as follows:

- Governor: Andrew E. Lee, Populist
- Lieutenant Governor: T. C. Robinson, Free Silver Republican
- Secretary of State: George Sparling, Populist
- Treasurer: Maris Taylor, Democrat
- Superintendent of Public Instruction: L. G. Hintz, Democrat
- Attorney General: C. S. Palmer, Free Silver Republican
- Auditor: Hugh J. Smith, Democrat
- Commissioner of School Lands: John Scollard, Democrat
- Railroad Commissioner: W. H. Tompkins, Populist

== Republican convention ==
State Treasurer Kirk G. Phillips entered the Republican convention, held on August 24, 1898, in Mitchell, as the clear frontrunner for the Republican nomination. He ended up winning the nomination in a landslide, winning 449 votes to O. S. Gifford's 449 and H. M. Finnerud's 43.

== General election ==
=== Results ===
1898 South Dakota gubernatorial special election
| Party | Candidate | Votes | % | ±% |
|---|---|---|---|---|
| Fusion | Andrew E. Lee (inc.) | 37,319 | 49.65% | −0.10% |
| Republican | Kirk G. Phillips | 36,949 | 49.16% | −0.21% |
| Prohibition | K. Lewis | 891 | 1.19% | +0.31% |
| Majority | | 370 | 0.49% | +0.11% |
| Turnout | | 75,159 | 100.00% | |
| Fusion hold | | | | |
