= 1896 South Dakota gubernatorial election =

- November 3, 1896
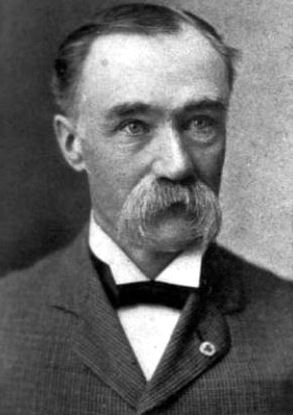

Nominee	Andrew E. Lee	Amund O. Ringsrud
Party	Populist	Republican
Popular vote	41,187	40,868
Percentage	49.76%	49.37%
- County results Lee: 40–50% 50–60% 60–70% Ringsrud: 50–60% 60–70% 70–80% 80–90% Tie: 50% No Vote
Governor of South Dakota before election
Charles H. Sheldon
Republican
Elected Governor of South Dakota
Andrew E. Lee
Populist

The 1896 South Dakota gubernatorial election was held on November 3, 1896. Incumbent Republican Governor Charles H. Sheldon declined to run for re-election to a third term. Former Secretary of State Amund O. Ringsrud was nominated as Sheldon's replacement at the Republican convention. Ringrud's main opponent was businessman Andrew E. Lee, who was nominated by a makeshift coalition of Populists, Free Silver Republicans, and Democrats. In the general election, Lee narrowly defeated Ringsrud, the first defeat for the Republican Party in a gubernatorial election since statehood.

== Republican convention ==
In the lead-up to the Republican convention, which took place in Aberdeen on July 8, 1896, several candidates either announced their candidacies for Governor or were seen as likely candidates: former Secretary of State Amund O. Ringsrud, Lieutenant Governor Charles N. Herreid, former State Representative Millard F. Greeley from Deuel County, and F. G. Hale, a member of the South Dakota Board of Regents. As the convention approached, Ringsrud emerged as the frontrunner, and ultimately won the nomination.

== People's Party convention ==
After three straight elections in which the left-leaning vote in South Dakota was split, a fusion finally took place. The coalition was precipitated by the exodus of Free Silver Republicans from the Republican Party of South Dakota, led by U.S. Senator Richard F. Pettigrew. Pettigrew and the Silver Republicans joined forces with the Populist Party at its convention, which started on July 15, 1896, in Huron. In the months preceding the convention, there was much speculation about whether prominent businessman Andrew E. Lee would be the Populist nominee for Governor, or whether another candidate—like F. M. Goodykoontz or former territorial legislator H. B. Wynn—would replace him. But when Pettigrew's forces joined with the Populists, Pettigrew began negotiating with Henry A. Loucks, a prominent leader in the Farmers' Alliance. The tentative agreement between Pettigrew and Loucks was to name Wynn as their nominee for Governor, and if this failed, to name Lee for Governor and Wynn for Treasurer. But Wynn's refusal to accept a position other than Governor, and Lee's refusal to accept any deal with Wynn, ultimately led the convention to nominate Lee for Governor. Shortly after the convention, the Democratic Party endorsed the Populist slate of candidates, declining to hold its own convention. As a result, the People's Party was formed to contest the 1896 election.

== Campaign ==
Populist candidates John Edward Kelley and Freeman Knowles also won both of South Dakota's seats in the concurrent U.S. House election.

== General election ==
=== Results ===
1896 South Dakota gubernatorial election
Party	Candidate	Votes	%	±%
Populist	Andrew E. Lee	41,187	49.76%	+15.12%
Republican	Amund O. Ringsrud	40,868	49.37%	−3.27%
Prohibition	J. F. Hanson	722	0.87%	−0.45%
Majority		319	0.39%	−17.62%
Turnout		82,777	100.00%	
Populist gain from Republican				

== Works cited ==
- Maier, Chris (2014). "The Farmers' Fight for Representation: Third-Party Politics in South Dakota, 1889–1918". Great Plains Quarterly. 34 (2). University of Nebraska Press: 143–62. doi:10.2307/24468096. JSTOR 24468096.
