= Daniel T. Hindman =

American politician

Daniel T. Hindman (February 22, 1839 – November 7, 1915) was an American politician and banker. Between 1897 and 1899 he was the fourth Lieutenant Governor of South Dakota.

== Life ==
Daniel Hindman was born near Oxford, Ohio. Later he moved with his parents to Indiana and Illinois where he attended the public schools and he also pursued a commercial course. During the Civil War he served in the Seventeenth Illinois Infantry, which was part of the Union Army. He fought in various battles and reached the rank of a lieutenant. Hindman stayed with the military until 1866 when he returned to Illinois where he lived until 1884. In that year he moved to the Dakota Territory where he settled in the area that is now known as Marshall County. He became treasurer of the Britton Land & Trust Company and he got involved in the lumber business and he bought and sold land. He was the owner of 480 aces of rich and valuable land and he also had large investments in Los Angeles in California. Additionally he was engaged in banking. He became President of the Citizens Bank and he was one of the founders and President of the First National Bank of Britton.

Politically he joined the Republican Party. His political career started during the years when he still lived in Illinois. There he was treasurer of the Mercer County and of the Agricultural Society. After his relocation to the Dakota Territory he continued his political activities. In 1890 he was elected to the South Dakota Senate, where he remained for two years and in 1896 he was elected to the office of the Lieutenant Governor of South Dakota. He served in this position between 1897 and 1899 when his term ended. In this function he was the deputy of Governor Andrew E. Lee and he presided over the State Senate. In 1900 he was an alternate delegate to the Republican National Convention that nominated President William McKinley for re-election. After the end of his term as Lieutenant Governor Daniel Hindman did not hold any other political offices. However he continued his former business activities. Hindman died on November 7, 1915, in New Boston, Illinois.

Political offices
Preceded by Charles N. Herreid	Lieutenant Governor of South Dakota; 1897-1899	Succeeded by John T. Kean
