= 2025 in South Dakota =

- Decades: 2000s; 2010s; 2020s
- See also: History of South Dakota; Historical outline of South Dakota; List of years in South Dakota; 2025 in the United States

The following is a list of events of the year 2025 in South Dakota.

== Incumbents ==
=== State government ===
- Governor: Kristi Noem (R) (until January 25), Larry Rhoden (R) (starting January 25)

== Events ==
- March 6 – Governor Larry Rhoden signs a law prohibiting the taking of private property for the use of building carbon dioxide pipelines.
- September 24 – A federal judge orders the University of South Dakota to reinstate a professor who was fired for calling Charlie Kirk a "hate-spreading Nazi" following his assassination earlier that day.
- December 19 – A Sioux Falls hotel owner who banned Native Americans from the establishment in 2022 is found liable for discrimination.

=== Sports ===
- March 5 – 9: 2025 Summit League men's basketball tournament

== See also ==
- 2025 in the United States
