= James H. Fletcher =

American politician

James Hayden Fletcher (1835 – April 13, 1917) was an American politician who served as the first Lieutenant Governor of South Dakota from 1889 to 1891.

== Life ==
James Fletcher was born in Charlottetown, the capital and largest city of the Colony of Prince Edward Island. His father was John Fletcher, and his mother was Miss Moar, from New Perth.

In 1869, Fletcher was the editor of the "Island Argus." He later moved to Pierre, a settlement in the Dakota Territory, and became a member of the Republican Party. In 1889, he was elected to the office of Lieutenant Governor of the newly founded State of South Dakota, under Governor Arthur C. Mellette. He served in this position from 1889 to 1891, presiding over the South Dakota Senate.

Fletcher died in Portland, Oregon on April 13, 1917.

Political offices
Preceded by None	Lieutenant Governor of South Dakota; 1889-1891	Succeeded by George H. Hoffman
