= Henry Loucks =

American politician in South Dakota (1846–1928)

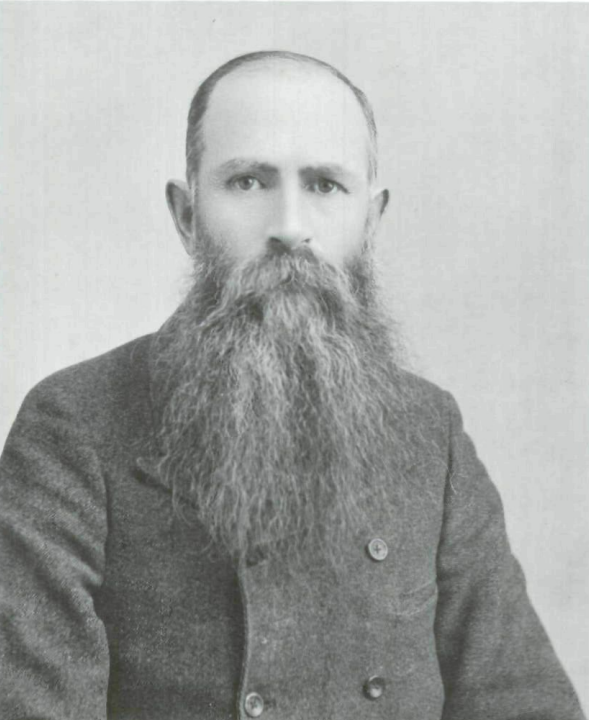
Loucks c. 1890.

Henry Loucks (1846–1928) was a newspaper editor and politician in the Dakota Territory, United States.

== Biography ==
Henry Langford Loucks was born in Canada of Luxembourger-German and Irish immigrants. In 1890, he was nominated by members of the Farmers' Alliance as candidate for governor of South Dakota for the Independent Party, a precursor to the People's Party (United States). However, he lost to Arthur C. Mellette.

He was also the editor of the Dakota Ruralist newspaper.

One of his sons, Daniel K. Loucks, was the Speaker of the South Dakota House of Representatives.

== Bibliography ==
- Government ownership of railroads and telegraph: as advocated by the National Farmers' Alliance and industrial union (1893)
- The new monetary system as advocated by the National Farmers' Alliance and Industrial Union (1895)
- The great conspiracy of the house of Morgan and how to defeat it (1916)
- Our Daily Bread: Must Be Freed from the Greed of Private Monopoly (1919)
- How to restore and maintain our government bonds at par (1921)
