= John T. Kean =

American politician

John Taylor Kean (March 11, 1857 – October 26, 1933) was an American politician. Between 1899 and 1901 he was the fifth Lieutenant Governor of South Dakota.

Kean was born in Whitewater, Wisconsin. Later he attended the public Schools in Monroe, Wisconsin. Afterwards he studied law at the University of Wisconsin–Madison and in 1877 he was admitted to the bar. For financial reasons he worked in different jobs until 1880 when he relocated to Lake Mills, Iowa, where he practiced as a lawyer. In 1883 he completed a post-graduate course at the National Law School in Washington, D.C., and in 1884 he moved to Woonsocket in the Dakota Territory, where he worked as an attorney. Between 1890 and 1892 he served as county judge of Sanborn County. In addition he was engaged in the real estate business.

Politically he joined the Republican Party. In 1898 he was elected to the office of the Lieutenant Governor of South Dakota. He served in this position between 1899 and 1901 when his term ended. In this function he was the deputy of Governor Andrew E. Lee and he presided over the South Dakota Senate. In 1902 he was elected to the Mayor's office of Woonsocket. Kean later moved to Minneapolis, Minnesota, and then to La Jolla, California. He died in La Jolla on October 26, 1933, at the age of 76.

Political offices
Preceded by Daniel T. Hindman	Lieutenant Governor of South Dakota; 1899-1901	Succeeded by George W. Snow
