= Edward Lincoln Abel =

American politician

Edward Lincoln Abel (17 November 1860 – 5 December 1926) was an American politician. Between 1913 and 1915 he served as Lieutenant Governor of South Dakota.

== Life ==
Edward Abel was born in Springfield, Illinois. He studied law and after his admission to the bar he practiced as an attorney. He settled in Bridgewater, South Dakota and continued his work as a lawyer. In addition he was engaged in agricultural pursuits such as farming and ranching and in the banking business. Politically he joined the Republican Party and became city attorney, alderman and mayor of Bridgewater. He was also President of the Board of Education. Between 1903 and 1906 he held a seat in the State Senate. Since 1907 he resided in Huron, South Dakota where he also occupied some local political offices. In 1907 he became president of the City National Bank.

In 1912, Abel was elected to the office of the Lieutenant Governor of South Dakota. He served in this position between 1913 and 1915 when his term ended. In this function he was the deputy of Governor Frank M. Byrne and he presided over the State Senate. After the end of his term he did not hold any other political offices. He died on 5 December 1926 in Long Beach, California.

Political offices
Preceded by Frank M. Byrne	Lieutenant Governor of South Dakota; 1913-1915	Succeeded by Peter Norbeck
