= 2024 in South Dakota =

- Decades: 2000s; 2010s; 2020s
- See also: History of South Dakota; Historical outline of South Dakota; List of years in South Dakota; 2024 in the United States

The following is a list of events of the year 2024 in South Dakota.

== Incumbents ==
=== State government ===
- Governor:Kristi Noem (R)

== Events ==
- June 24 – Officials in Blue Earth County, Minnesota issue an evacuation warning due to flooding on the Blue Earth River breaching the Rapidan Dam, pushing it into an "imminent failure condition" upstream of several cities. Flooding collapses a railroad bridge connecting South Dakota and Iowa and kills two people.
- November 5 –
  - 2024 United States presidential election in South Dakota
  - 2024 South Dakota House of Representatives election

== See also ==
- 2024 in the United States
