= 2023 in South Dakota =

- Decades: 2000s; 2010s; 2020s
- See also: History of South Dakota; Historical outline of South Dakota; List of years in South Dakota; 2023 in the United States

The following is a list of events of the year 2023 in South Dakota.

== Incumbents ==
=== State government ===
- Governor:Kristi Noem (R)

== Events ==
- June 28 – Smoke from the wildfires in Canada reaches a number of U.S. states including South Dakota.

== Sports ==
- Augustana (South Dakota) Vikings men's ice hockey team is established at the Augustana University.
- August 11 – Bellator 298 is held at the Sanford Pentagon in Sioux Falls.

== See also ==
- 2023 in the United States
