= Hughes County Courthouse =

- U.S. National Register of Historic Places
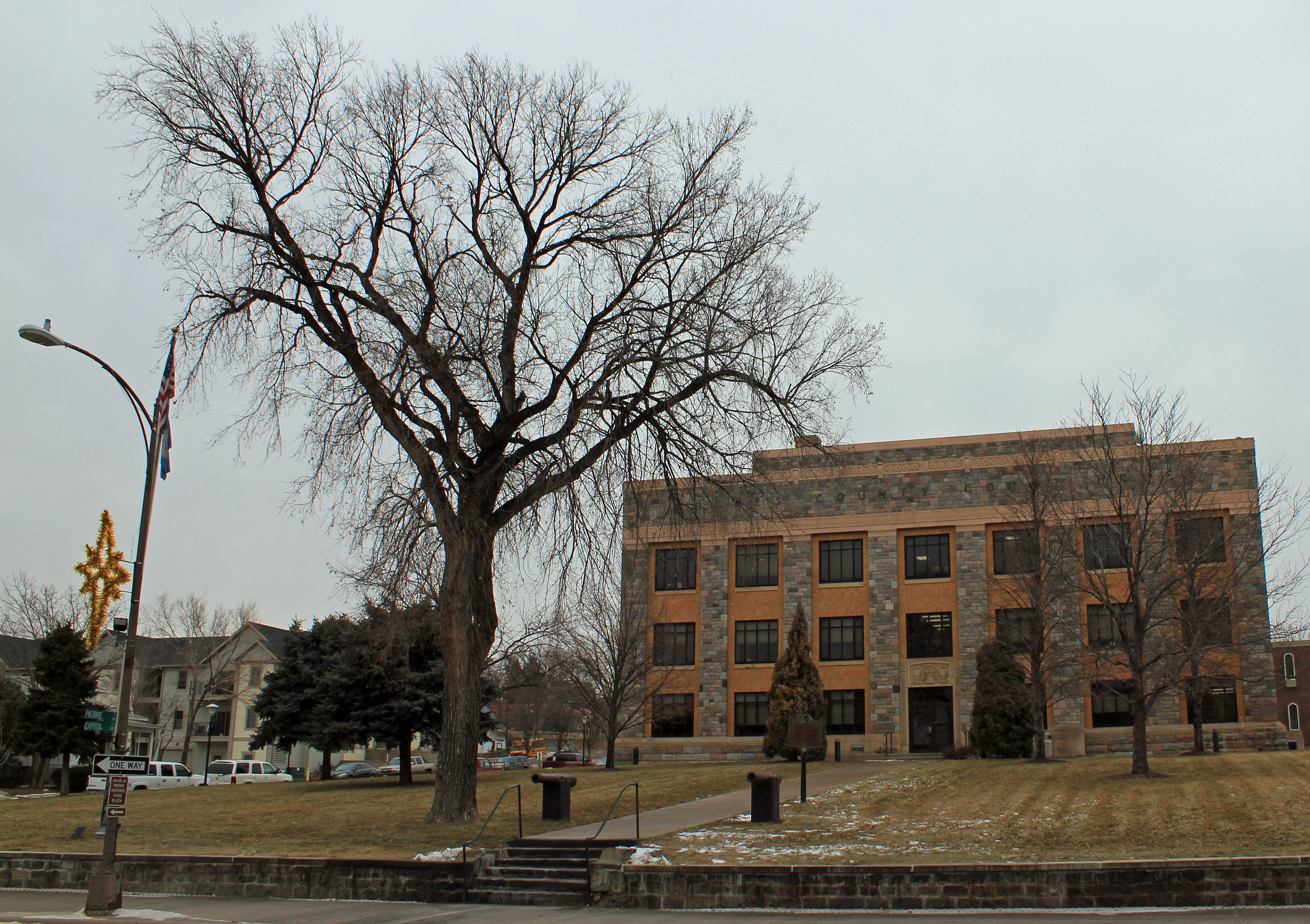

- Location within South Dakota Location within the United States
- Interactive map showing the location of Hughes County Courthouse
- Location: Capitol Ave. between Grand and Euclid Aves., Pierre, South Dakota
- Coordinates: 44°22′9″N 100°21′2″W
- Area: less than one acre
- Built: 1934–35
- Built by: Henry Carlson Co.
- Architect: Hugill & Blatherwick
- Architectural style: Moderne, Art Deco
- MPS: County Courthouses of South Dakota MPS
- NRHP reference No.: 92001859
- Added to NRHP: February 10, 1993

The Hughes County Courthouse, located on Capitol Avenue in Pierre, is the center of government of Hughes County, South Dakota. The courthouse was built from 1934 to 1935, replacing a building built in 1883. Architects Hugill & Blatherwick designed the building in the Moderne style with Art Deco details, a common design choice in courthouses of the period. While their design was generally minimalist, it includes some Art Deco decorations, such as spandrels with patterned brickwork that divide the vertically arranged windows.

The courthouse was added to the National Register of Historic Places on February 10, 1993.
