= Howard C. Shober =

American politician

Howard Clayton Shober (24 December 1859 – 29 April 1956) was an American politician. Between 1907 and 1911 he served as Lieutenant Governor of South Dakota.

== Life ==
Howard Shober was born in Tipton, Iowa. He grew up on a farm and after the completion of his own education he worked as teacher for a time. Since 1882 he resided in Highmore, South Dakota, where he was engaged in the newspaper business. In addition he was also interested in cattle raising. He joined the Republican Party. He became chairman of the Republican Central Committee in Hyde County, South Dakota and he was a member of the Republican state central committee. He also held the positions of the County Commissioner and the County auditor. In the years 1905 and 1906 Howard Shober was a member of the State Senate. In 1906 he was elected to the office of the Lieutenant Governor of South Dakota. After a re-election in 1908 he served in this position between 1906 and 1911 when his second term ended. In this function he was the deputy of Governor Coe I. Crawford (first term) and Governor Robert S. Vessey (second term) and he presided over the State Senate. In 1916 he was an alternate delegate to the Republican National Convention. Howard Shober died at the age of 96 years on 29 April 1956 in Huron, South Dakota.

Political offices
| Preceded by John E. McDougall | Lieutenant Governor of South Dakota; 1907-1911 | Succeeded by Frank M. Byrne |
