= Mellette House =

- U.S. National Register of Historic Places
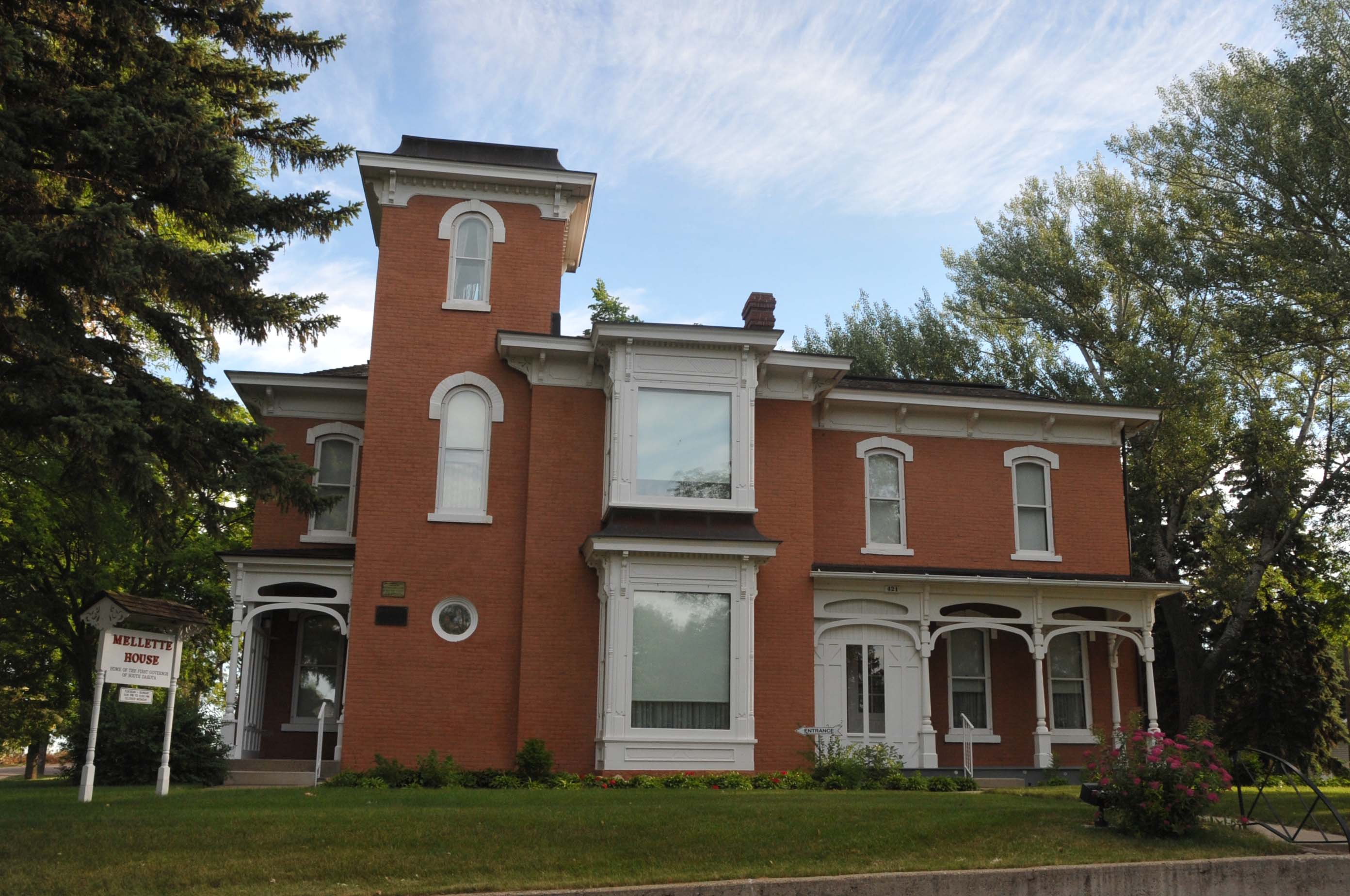

- Location within South Dakota Location within the United States
- Interactive map showing the location of Mellette House
- Nearest city: Watertown, South Dakota
- Coordinates: 44°54′26″N 97°07′16″W
- Built: 1885
- Architectural style: Italianate
- NRHP reference No.: 76001725
- Added to NRHP: 13 August 1976

The Mellette House is a historic home and museum located at 421 Fifth Avenue Northwest in Watertown, South Dakota. It is the former residence of the first governor of South Dakota, Arthur C. Mellette.

The Mellette family built the two story house in 1885 on Prospect Hill (now Mellette Hill) and lived there until 1895. It was the location of Watertown's first radio station in 1929. When the house was condemned in 1943, a group purchased the property and formed the Mellette Memorial Association to restore and preserve it. They now give free tours in the summer. The house was added to the National Register of Historic Places in 1976. There are pictures of the Mellette family in the house along with original furniture and household items.
