= 1889 South Dakota gubernatorial election =

- October 1, 1889
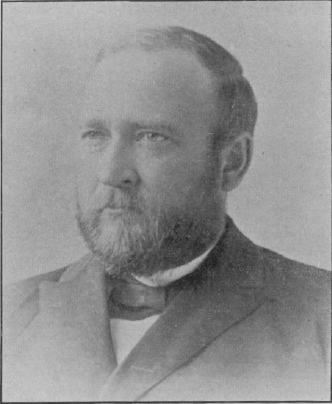

Nominee	Arthur C. Mellette	P. F. McClure
Party	Republican	Democratic
Popular vote	53,964	23,840
Percentage	69.36%	30.64%
- County results Mellette: 50–60% 60–70% 70–80% 80–90% >90% McClure: 50–60% No Vote
Governor of Dakota Territory before election
Arthur C. Mellette
Republican
Governor of South Dakota
Arthur C. Mellette
Republican

The 1889 South Dakota gubernatorial election was held on October 1, 1889, to elect the first Governor of South Dakota. Territorial Governor Arthur C. Mellette received the Republican nomination and faced former Territorial Commissioner of Immigration P. F. McClure, the Democratic nominee, in the general election. Mellette defeated McClure in a landslide.

== Party conventions ==
At the Republican convention in August 1889, Territorial Governor Arthur C. Mellette faced no opponents in the gubernatorial race and was nominated by acclamation. The next week, at the Democratic convention, Adjutant General James W. Harden was nominated for governor, but upon the nomination of Territorial Commissioner of Immigration P. F. McClure, Harden's name was withdrawn and McClure was nominated by acclamation.

1889 South Dakota gubernatorial election
Party	Candidate	Votes	%
Republican	Arthur C. Mellette (inc.)	53,964	69.36%
Democratic	P. F. McClure	23,840	30.64%
Majority		30,124	38.72%
Total votes		77,804	100.00%
Republican hold			
