= Charles N. Herreid =

American politician

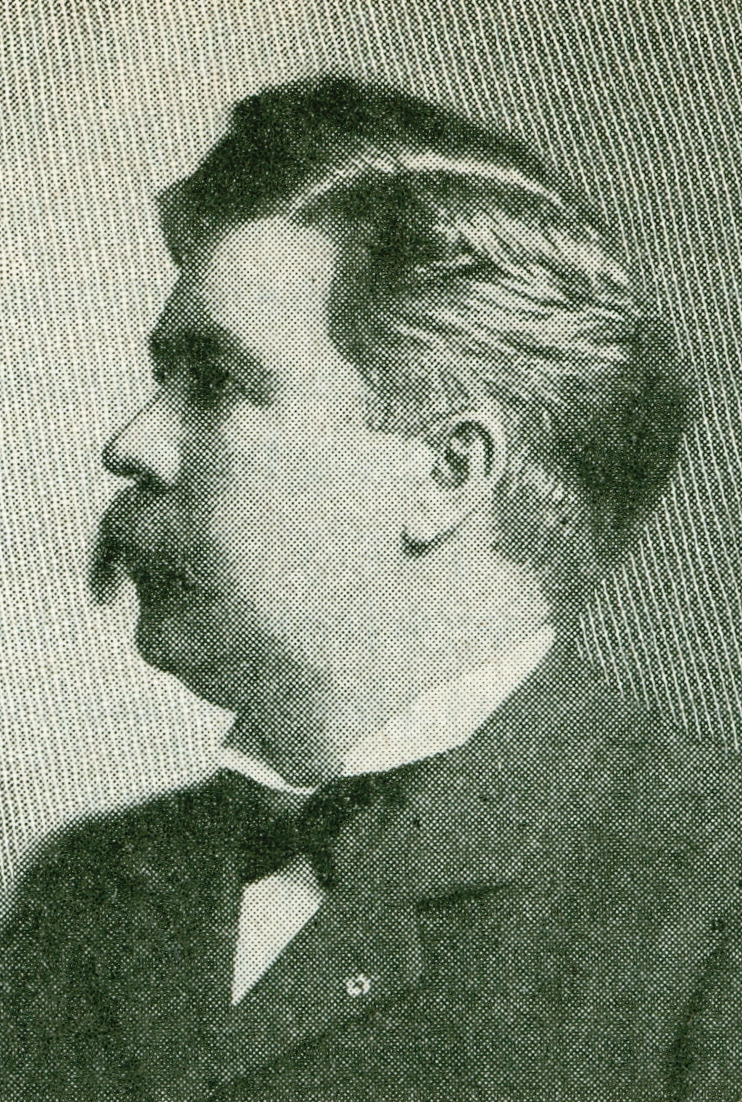

4th Governor of South Dakota
- In office January 8, 1901 – January 3, 1905
- Lieutenant: George W. Snow
- Preceded by: Andrew E. Lee
- Succeeded by: Samuel H. Elrod

Lieutenant Governor of South Dakota
- In office 1893–1897
- Governor: Charles H. Sheldon
- Preceded by: George H. Hoffman
- Succeeded by: Daniel T. Hindman

Personal details
- Born: October 20, 1857 Dane County, Wisconsin, U.S.
- Died: July 6, 1928 (aged 70) Aberdeen, South Dakota, U.S.
- Party: Republican
- Spouse: Eunice Jeanette Slye
- Education: University of Wisconsin–Madison
- Profession: Attorney; Banker

Charles Nelson Herreid (October 20, 1857 – July 6, 1928) was the fourth governor of South Dakota.

== Biography ==
Charles Herreid was born in Dane County, Wisconsin. His parents, Nels Olson Herreid (1832–1902) and Thone Kittelson Herreid (1833–1908), were both Norwegian immigrants. He attended Galesville University in Wisconsin from 1874 to 1878 and the University of Wisconsin from 1880 to 1882. He married Jeannette E. Slye in 1881 and he moved to McPherson County, South Dakota in 1883. There he served as a McPherson County court judge from 1888 to 1891.

== Career ==
Herreid was elected Lieutenant Governor of the new State of South Dakota from 1892 to 1896. He chaired the Republican State Central Committee from 1898 until 1900, when he was elected governor. Herreid, a Republican from Eureka, South Dakota, served from 1901 to 1905. He had previously served as the third Lieutenant Governor of South Dakota from 1893 to 1897 under Governor Charles H. Sheldon.

During Herreid's first gubernatorial term, efforts were made to reform the state's penal code, and a reduction in railroad rates helped ease the plight of farmers. Herreid worked for growth in state schools, Indian care and the development of good roads during his term as governor. During his second term, big business interests were brought under control, as was the power of political machines.

Herreid declined to run for a third term, returning to his law practice in Aberdeen, South Dakota. In addition to his political activism and engagement in the practice of law, during his lifetime, Herreid was director of the Western Mutual Life Insurance Company, president of Citizens Trust and Savings Bank, Federal Food Administrator for South Dakota, chairman of the South Dakota Military Training Camps Association, trustee of the University of Wisconsin, and a member of the Board of Regents for Education for South Dakota. He also served as a member of the South Dakota committee of the Red Cross.

== Death ==
Herreid died in Aberdeen, South Dakota

Party political offices
Preceded by Kirk G. Phillips	Republican nominee for Governor of South Dakota; 1900, 1902	Succeeded by Samuel H. Elrod
Political offices
Preceded by George H. Hoffman	Lieutenant Governor of South Dakota; 1893–1897	Succeeded by Daniel T. Hindman
Preceded by Andrew E. Lee	Governor of South Dakota; 1901–1905	Succeeded by Samuel H. Elrod
