= George W. Snow =

American politician

George W. Snow (December 13, 1842 – November 8, 1927) was an American politician who served as the Lieutenant Governor of South Dakota between 1901 and 1905.

== Early life ==
George W. Snow was born on December 13, 1842, in Posey County, Indiana. During his childhood, his family relocated to Wisconsin.

During the American Civil War, Snow served in Company F of the 20th Wisconsin Infantry Regiment, joining in August 1862 and leaving in July 1865.

== Career ==
In 1869, he moved to South Dakota and settled in Bon Homme County. He was the second person to settle in the area which later became Springfield. While there, he became involved in the banking and real estate businesses.

Prior to 1899, Snow served two terms as treasurer of Bon Homme County. He was a member of the 1885 Dakota constitutional convention in Sioux Falls.

In 1890, he began serving as a member of the South Dakota Senate. From 1901 until 1905, he served as Lieutenant Governor of South Dakota.

=== Other activities ===
In 1867, Snow was initiated into the Independent Order of Odd Fellows, later serving as grand master and grand treasurer. He also served as a grand patron of the Order of the Eastern Star for South Dakota, and grand treasurer of the state's Grand Masonic Lodge in 1886. He was a member and master of Mt. Zion lodge No. 6 in Springfield, a member of the Oriental Consistory at Yankton and the El Riad Shrine in Sioux Falls.

Snow served as commander of the Grand Army of the Republic's South Dakota department in 1901 and 1902.

== Personal life ==
Snow was a member of the Episcopal church.

Snow had at least one son, Frank M. Snow, with whom he entered into business. He died on November 8, 1927, and his funeral was held in Springfield two days later.

Political offices
Preceded by John T. Kean	Lieutenant Governor of South Dakota; 1901-1905	Succeeded by John E. McDougall
