= 1890 South Dakota gubernatorial election =

- November 4, 1890
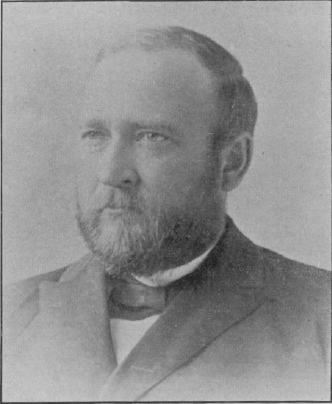

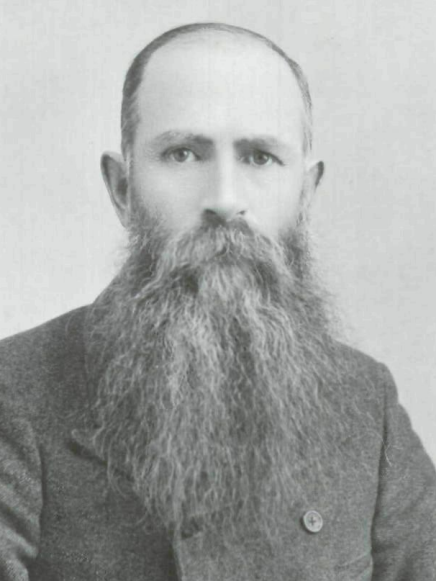

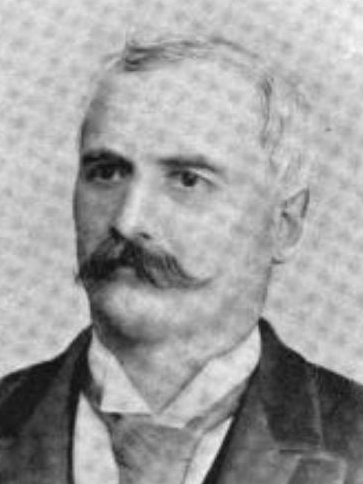
Nominee	Arthur C. Mellette	Henry Loucks	Maris Taylor
Party	Republican	Independent Party	Democratic
Popular vote	34,487	24,591	18,484
Percentage	44.46%	31.70%	23.83%
- County results Mellette: 30–40% 40–50% 50–60% 60–70% Loucks: 30–40% 40–50% 50–60% 60–70% Taylor: 40–50% No Vote
Governor of South Dakota before election
Arthur C. Mellette
Republican
Elected Governor of South Dakota
Arthur C. Mellette
Republican

The 1890 South Dakota gubernatorial election was held on November 4, 1890. Incumbent Republican Governor Arthur C. Mellette ran for re-election to a second term. He was challenged in the general election by State Surveyor General Maris Taylor, the Democratic nominee, and Henry A. Loucks, the President of the South Dakota Farmers' Alliance and the Independent Party nominee. In part because the left-leaning vote was split, Mellette won re-election, but by a significantly reduced margin, winning a weak plurality with just 44% of the vote. Loucks beat out Maris for second place, receiving 32% of the vote to Taylor's 24%.

== Party conventions ==
At the Democratic convention in June 1890, many convention delegates wanted to nominate Bartlett Tripp, the former Chief Justice of the Dakota Territorial Supreme Court. However, Tripp had declined to be a candidate several weeks prior, and State Surveyor General Maris Taylor was nominated by acclamation. Similarly, at the Republican convention in August, Governor Arthur C. Mellette received the gubernatorial nomination by acclamation.

Separately, the South Dakota Farmers' Alliance held a convention in 1890 and delegates voted to form the Independent Party and to contest the state elections. When the delegates reconvened at their nominating convention in July, Henry L. Loucks, the President of the Alliance, who had been seen as the frontrunner for the Independent Party's nomination in June, faced a challenge from Abraham Lincoln Van Osdel, a former territorial legislator. A close race developed between Loucks and Van Osdel, with just two votes separating them on the first, informal ballot and Loucks leading, 127–125. On the second, formal ballot, Loucks defeated Van Osdel by a wider margin, 134–115, and Van Osdel was subsequently nominated for Lieutenant Governor.

== General election ==
=== Results ===
1892 South Dakota gubernatorial special election
Party	Candidate	Votes	%	±%
Republican	Arthur C. Mellette (inc.)	34,487	44.46%	−24.90%
Independent Party	H. L. Loucks	24,591	31.70%	—
Democratic	Maris Taylor	18,484	23.83%	−6.81%
Majority		9,896	12.76%	−25.96%
Turnout		77,562	100.00%	
Republican hold				
