= John E. McDougall =

American politician (1860-1907)

John Edmund McDougall (24 February 1860 – 13 April 1932) was an American politician. Between 1905 and 1907 he served as Lieutenant Governor of South Dakota.

== Life ==
John McDougall was born in Prince Edward Island, then part of British North America. He attended the public schools and was trained as a carpenter. At the age of twenty he left his home and emigrated to the United States where he lived in Maine, Massachusetts and in Minneapolis before he settled in Britton, South Dakota. In his new home town he worked in different jobs. Mainly he was engaged in agricultural pursuits and he owned a large stock farm of four hundred acres which he managed. He shipped cattle and hogs and became a rich man. The Political Graveyard also states he was a lawyer, however this remains unclear because it is not verified in other sources.

Politically he joined the Republican Party. In the years 1901 and 1902 he was a member of the South Dakota House of Representatives and from 1903 to 1904 he held a seat in the State Senate. In 1904 McDougall was elected to the office of the Lieutenant Governor of South Dakota. He served in this position between 1905 and 1907 when his term ended. In this function he was the deputy of Governor Samuel H. Elrod and he presided over the State Senate. After the end of his term he did not hold any other political offices. John McDougall died on 13 April 1932 in South Dakota.

Political offices
Preceded by George W. Snow	Lieutenant Governor of South Dakota; 1905-1907	Succeeded by Howard C. Shober
