= George H. Hoffman =

American politician

George Harrison Hoffman (January 21, 1838 – August 31, 1922) was the second Lieutenant Governor of South Dakota from 1891 to 1893.

== Life ==
George Hoffman was born in Adams County, Pennsylvania. In 1844 he moved with his parents to DeKalb County, Indiana where his father worked as teacher and farmer, while he attended the local schools. Later he worked as a carpenter and he was also engaged in agriculture. During the American Civil War he enlisted in the Union Army as a member of the Thirteenth Indiana Volunteer Infantry. After the war he returned to Indiana where he worked as a farmer until 1884. In that year he moved with his sons to the Dakota Territory where he founded a Ranch in Walworth County, South Dakota.

Politically Hoffman joined the Republican Party. In 1889 when South Dakota became a regular US-State he was elected to the State Senate. In 1890 he was elected to the office of the Lieutenant Governor of South Dakota. He served in this position between 1891 and 1893 when his term ended. In this function, he was the deputy of Governor Arthur C. Mellette and he presided over the State Senate. Hoffman was also a member of various organizations and institutions including the Grand Army of the Republic. He died on 31 August 1922.

Political offices
Preceded by James H. Fletcher	Lieutenant Governor of South Dakota; 1891–1893	Succeeded by Charles N. Herreid
