= Fusion Party =

Various political parties

Fusion Party is a name for multiple political parties in United States history and more recently a federal political party established in Australia. The different parties that used the name don't share any particular political positions; instead, confederations of people from disparate political backgrounds united around a common cause individual to their situation—often opposition to a common enemy—and used the name Fusion Party to reflect the aggregate nature of their new party.

== City Fusion Party in New York City ==
The City Fusion Party of New York City was the vehicle that Republican Fiorello La Guardia used to defeat the Democrats of Tammany Hall and get elected mayor of New York in 1933, and reelected in 1937 and 1941. It was part of the New Deal coalition and worked closely with President Franklin D. Roosevelt, who provided federal patronage.

== Fusion Party in Ohio and Indiana ==
The Fusion Party was the original name of the Republican Party in the state of Ohio. In 1854, anti-slavery parties were forming in many northern states in opposition to the Kansas Nebraska Act of 1854. While many of these state parties adopted the name "Republican", the Ohio convention adopted the name "Fusionist" or "Fusion Party", which they felt more accurately described the fusion of persons from a variety of political backgrounds, including members of the Free Soil Party, the Conscience Whig Party, and the Know-Nothing Party along with members of the Democratic Party who were opposed to slavery.

Similarly, in Indiana, the Know-Nothings were not strong enough to run candidates on their own, and so combined with Republicans and other interest groups to run candidates on the Fusion or People's Party tickets in opposition to the Anti-Nebraska movement.

== Fusion Party in South Dakota ==
In South Dakota, the Fusion Party was a short-lived political party that existed in the late 19th and early 20th centuries. The party was formed in 1896 from an alliance of Democrats, Free Silver Republicans, and Populists who were opposed to the platform of the state Republican Party. A total of 56 Fusion Party representatives were elected to the state legislature during its brief existence. In addition, Senator Richard F. Pettigrew, who served from 1889 to 1901, was the Fusion Party candidate for the Senate in 1900, having left the Republican Party to join the Silver Republicans in 1896. South Dakota Governor Andrew E. Lee was also an elected to his second term as a Fusionist.

== Fusion Party in Nevada ==
In the very early 20th century, a coalition of Nevada Democrats and Silverites called themselves the Fusion Party upon the insistence of Francis G. Newlands, who wanted to emphasize the need for fusion between the two groups if he wanted to hope for victory in the 1902 election. Fusion clubs were established in a number of counties throughout Nevada, and, despite a few temporary setbacks, a successful fusion of the two parties in the state did occur, and Newlands was elected Senator.

== Fusion Party in Australia ==
Established in January 2022, the Fusion Party is an amalgamation of five political parties. The Climate Change Justice Party, Pirate Party, Science Party, Secular Party of Australia, and Vote Planet. The merger was initiated by a change in the Australian Electoral Commission legislative change to require a minimum of 1500 active members. Concerned that each of the five parties would not be able to meet the minimum criteria, they joined together under the Fusion Party.

== See also ==
- Fusionism in North Carolina
