= Charles H. Sheldon =

American politician and 2nd Governor of South Dakota

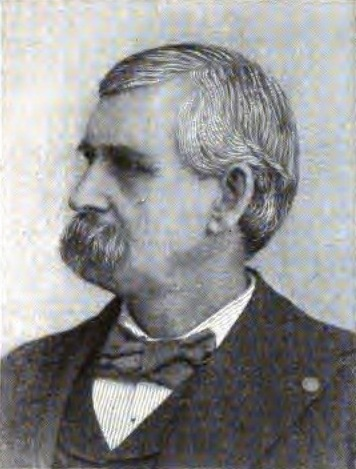

2nd Governor of South Dakota
- In office January 3, 1893 – January 1, 1897
- Lieutenant: Charles N. Herreid
- Preceded by: Arthur C. Mellette
- Succeeded by: Andrew E. Lee

Personal details
- Born: September 12, 1840 Johnson, Vermont, U.S.
- Died: October 20, 1898 (aged 58) Deadwood, South Dakota, U.S.
- Party: Republican
- Spouses: Mary Waters; Martha Frizzell
- Profession: Farmer

Charles Henry Sheldon (September 12, 1840 – October 20, 1898) was the second governor of South Dakota.

== Biography ==
Charles Henry Sheldon was born in Johnson, Vermont, the third of four children of Gresham and Mary (Brown) Sheldon. After the death of his father in 1844, Sheldon worked as a farm laborer from the ages of twelve to eighteen; and then, he worked at a store. He joined the abolitionist movement. On November 23, 1861, Sheldon joined Company E of the 7th Vermont Infantry Regiment and then entered active service in 1862 as a sergeant at Rutland, Vermont. On July 13, 1865, he became a captain and was then mustered out at Brownsville, Texas. Sheldon's last year in the military was spent on the western frontier. After leaving the Army, Sheldon entered the mercantile business in Pope County, Illinois. Sheldon's first wife, Mary Walters Sheldon, died in 1874. They had two children. His second wife was Martha Frizell Sheldon with whom he had three children.

== Career ==
After spending his last year in Illinois at Chicago, Charles Sheldon moved to Groton in Brown County, Dakota Territory because of the health of his son, James. Doctors had told Sheldon that only a northern climate could help his son, who was suffering from malaria. Sheldon settled on government land and became a farmer. Sheldon entered politics in 1886, when he represented the twelfth legislative district in the Territorial Legislature. He represented Day, Roberts, Grant, and Codington Counties; and, this continued until 1887. In 1890, Sheldon was chairman of the Day County delegation at the state Republican convention in Mitchell, South Dakota. At the state Republican convention in 1892, Sheldon was nominated for Governor. In the general election, he beat both A. L. Van Osdel (the Independent candidate) and Peter Couchman (the Democratic Candidate). He held the office for two terms from 1893 to 1897.

== Death ==
In 1897, Sheldon retired to his farm near Pierpont. He went on a speaking tour for the Republicans during the 1898 election campaign but fell ill as a result of a cold. Sheldon gave his last speech at Deadwood on October 15, 1898, and died of pneumonia five days later, with his wife and son at his bedside. He was buried at the Pierpont Cemetery.

Party political offices
Preceded by Arthur C. Mellette	Republican nominee for Governor of South Dakota; 1892, 1894	Succeeded by Amund O. Ringsrud
Political offices
Preceded by Arthur C. Mellette	Governor of South Dakota; 1893–1897	Succeeded by Andrew E. Lee
