= Andrew E. Lee =

American politician

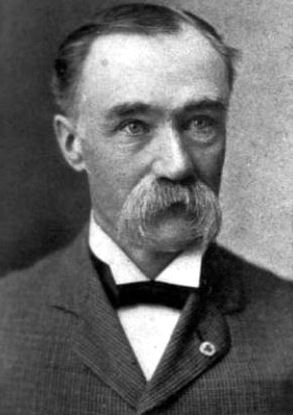

3rd Governor of South Dakota
- In office January 1, 1897 – January 8, 1901
- Lieutenant: Charles N. Herreid; Daniel T. Hindman; John T. Kean
- Preceded by: Charles H. Sheldon
- Succeeded by: Charles N. Herreid

Personal details
- Born: March 18, 1847 Bergen, Norway
- Died: March 19, 1934 (aged 87) Vermillion, South Dakota
- Party: People's Party
- Spouse: Annie Chappell
- Profession: Merchant

Andrew Ericson Lee (March 18, 1847 – March 19, 1934) was an American politician who served as the third governor of South Dakota.

== Biography ==
Lee was born near Bergen in Norway and at a young age moved with his parents to the United States. His parents were Eric Lee and Augusta (Johnson) Lee. He spent his childhood on a farm in Dane County, Wisconsin. He moved to Dakota Territory and settled at Vermillion in 1867. Lee and Charles E. Prentis became partners in a mercantile business in 1869.

== Career ==
In 1896, Lee ran for Governor of South Dakota on the Populist ticket and beat A. O. Ringsrud of Elk Point by only 319 votes. He was elected to his second term on the Fusion Party ticket, an alliance of Independents in the state. He was the only non-Republican governor to hold office until the election of William J. Bulow in 1926. Populist governor Lee was instrumental in getting the Initiative and Referendum passed. A major focus during his administration was eliminating inefficiency and mismanagement within State Government. A major issue during his administration was the organization and return of the state militia which served in the Philippines during the Spanish–American War.

In 1900, the Populists nominated Lee for Congress, and he spoke at the Populist convention in Sioux Falls, South Dakota. Lee lost in a Republican landslide, which ended the political influence of the Populists in South Dakota. In 1908, Lee ran unsuccessfully as a Democratic candidate for Governor of South Dakota.

== Death ==
Andrew Lee died at his home in Vermillion, South Dakota, on March 19, 1934, the day after his 87th birthday. The Gundersons and the Lees are buried in the old Bluff's Cemetery (Bluff View Cemetery in Vermillion, Clay County, South Dakota US).

Party political offices
First	Populist nominee for Governor of South Dakota; 1896	Succeeded by Himself as Fusion candidate
First	Fusion nominee for Governor of South Dakota; 1898	Succeeded by Burre H. Lien
Preceded by John A. Stransky	Democratic nominee for Governor of South Dakota; 1908	Succeeded by Chauncey L. Wood
Political offices
Preceded by Charles H. Sheldon	Governor of South Dakota; 1897–1901	Succeeded by Charles N. Herreid
