= Arthur C. Mellette =

American politician

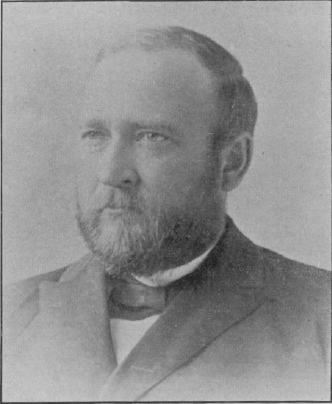

1st Governor of South Dakota
- In office November 2, 1889 – January 3, 1893
- Lieutenant: James H. Fletcher; George H. Hoffman
- Preceded by: Himself (as governor of Dakota Territory)
- Succeeded by: Charles H. Sheldon

10th Governor of the Dakota Territory
- In office March 22, 1889 – November 2, 1889
- Preceded by: Louis K. Church
- Succeeded by: John Miller (as governor of North Dakota); Himself (as governor of South Dakota)

Personal details
- Born: Arthur Calvin Mellette; June 23, 1842 Henry County, Indiana, U.S.
- Died: May 25, 1896 (aged 53) Pittsburg, Kansas, U.S.
- Resting place: Mount Hope Cemetery
- Party: Republican
- Spouse: Margaret Wylie
- Education: Indiana University, Bloomington (LLB)

Arthur Calvin Mellette (June 23, 1842 – May 25, 1896) was the last governor of Dakota Territory, the first governor of the State of South Dakota, and an American Civil War veteran.

He is the namesake of Mellette, South Dakota, and Mellette County, South Dakota.

== Early life, education, and Civil War ==
Mellette was the son of Charles Mellette and was born in Henry County, Indiana. He was educated at Marion Academy in Marion, Indiana. In 1862, Mellette entered Indiana University Bloomington as a sophomore and graduated in 1863. On October 6, 1864, he enlisted in Company H of the 9th Indiana Volunteers, serving as a conscripted soldier until mustering out on September 28, 1865. He served in the army as a substitute for his older invalid brother and experienced many humiliations as a result. In 1866, Mellette graduated from the School of Law at the Indiana University and went to Muncie, Indiana, where he began practicing law with Thomas J. Brady. On May 26, 1866, he married Margaret Wylie.

== Career ==
Mellette was elected as district attorney for Delaware County, Indiana. In 1870, Mellette purchased the Muncie Times, a newspaper which became influential and prosperous under his tutelage. During that same year, Mellette was elected the county superintendent of schools.

When his wife became ill, Mellette visited western states to find a climate that would be more beneficial to her. Mellette's family eventually settled in Springfield, Dakota Territory, for two years; and, Mellette served as register of the United States Land Office in Springfield until the land office was moved to Watertown, Dakota Territory, in 1880.

== Political career in the Dakotas ==
In October 1885, the Republicans nominated Mellette for governor of Dakota Territory. In November 1885, Mellette ran unopposed for the office of governor; and, voters selected Huron as the temporary capitol of Dakota Territory. In 1889, voters approved the new constitution for South Dakota and elected Arthur C. Mellette as South Dakota's first Governor. On November 2, 1889, President Benjamin Harrison signed the proclamation to make South Dakota the fortieth state. Mellette County, South Dakota, is named in his honor.

== Personal life ==
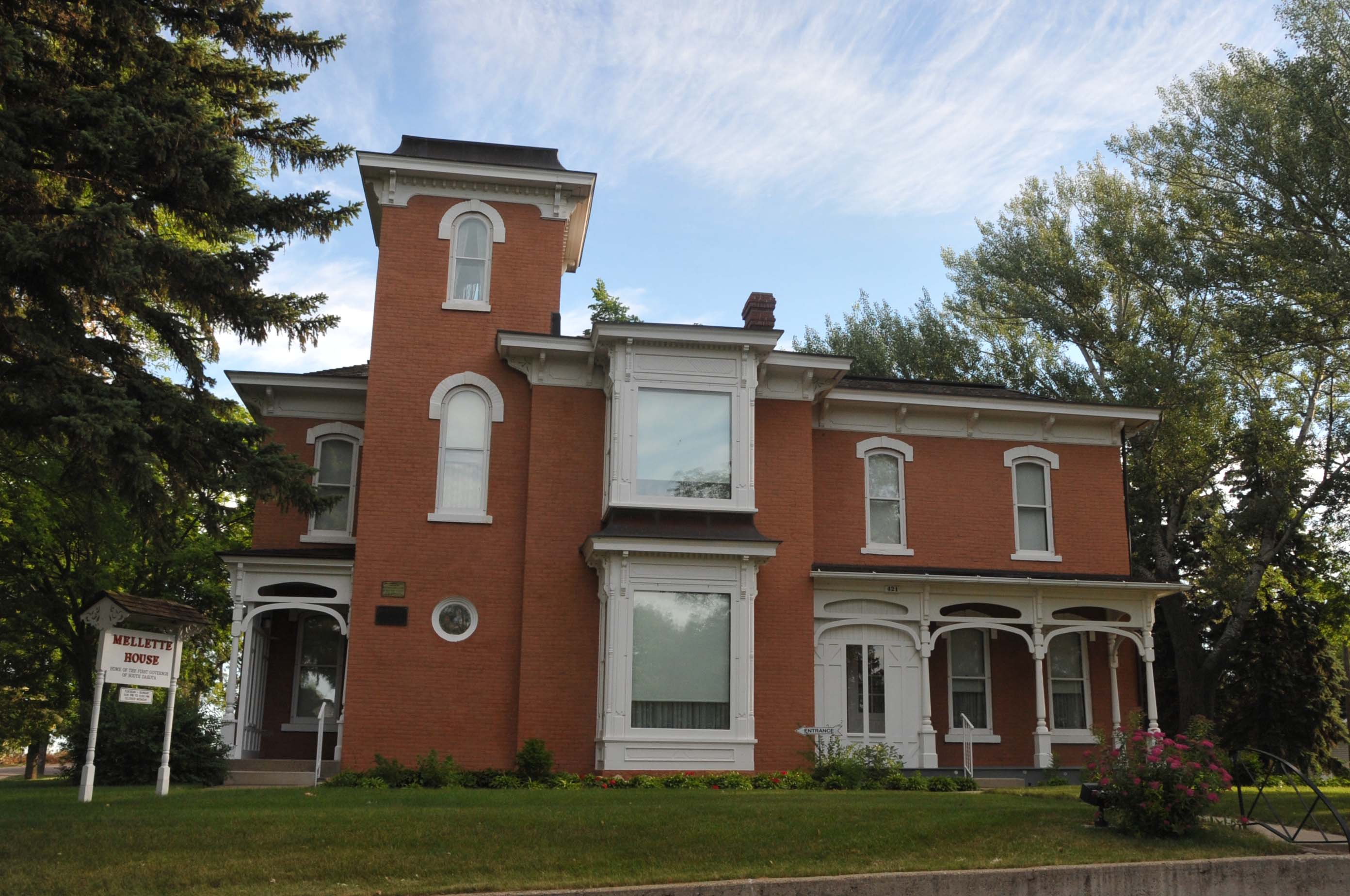
Mellette House in Watertown, South Dakota

Mellette built a mansion on the bluffs of the Big Sioux River in Watertown, South Dakota. He was an advocate of bringing the capitol to the area. He summered on Lake Kampeska.

== Death and legacy ==
The family made what was meant to be a temporary move from Watertown to Pittsburg, Kansas, in 1895. Mellette died May 25, 1896, while in Pittsburg. His body was sent back to Watertown and interred in Mount Hope Cemetery.

The Trail of Governors statue of Mellette, by sculptor John Lopez, was unveiled in 2012 and installed in Pierre, South Dakota in front of the Hughes County Courthouse.Mellette's former home in Watertown is maintained as a museum. In 2012, a statue of Mellette was unveiled in Pierre, South Dakota and installed in front of the Hughes County Courthouse; it was the first statue placed on the city's Trail of Governors.

Political offices
Preceded by Louis K. Church	Governor of the Dakota Territory; 1889	Succeeded by John Miller as Governor of North Dakota
Preceded by Louis K. Church	Governor of the Dakota Territory; 1889	Succeeded by Himself as Governor of South Dakota
Preceded by Himself as Governor of the Dakota Territory	Governor of South Dakota; 1889–1893	Succeeded by Charles H. Sheldon
Party political offices
First	Republican nominee for Governor of South Dakota; 1889, 1890	Succeeded by Charles H. Sheldon
