= History of South Dakota =

The history of South Dakota describes the history of the U.S. state of South Dakota over the course of several millennia, from its first inhabitants to the recent issues facing the state.

== Early inhabitants ==
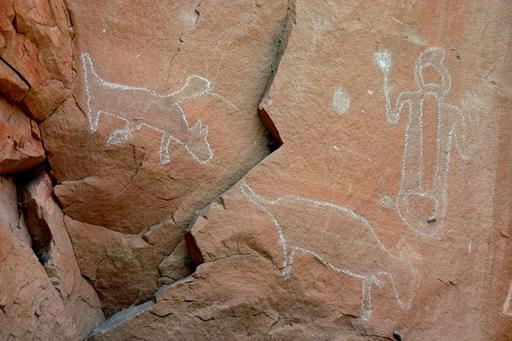
Craven Canyon petroglyphs in the Black Hills.

Human beings have lived in what is today South Dakota for at least several thousand years. Early hunters are believed to have first entered North America at least 17,000 years ago via the Bering land bridge, which existed during the last ice age and connected Siberia with Alaska. Early settlers in what would become South Dakota were nomadic hunter-gatherers, using primitive Stone Age technology to hunt large prehistoric mammals in the area such as mammoths, sloths, and camels. The Paleolithic culture of these people disappeared around 5000 BC, after the extinction of most of their prey species.

Between AD 500 and 800, much of eastern South Dakota was inhabited by a people known as the 'Mound Builders'. The Mound Builders were hunters who lived in temporary villages and were named for the low earthen burial mounds they constructed, many of which still exist. Their settlement seems to have been concentrated around the watershed of the Big Sioux River and Big Stone Lake, although other sites have been excavated throughout eastern South Dakota. Either assimilation or warfare led to the demise of the Mound Builders by the year 800. Between 1250 and 1400 an agricultural people, likely the ancestors of the modern Mandan of North Dakota, arrived from the east and settled in the central part of the state. In 1325, what has become known as the Crow Creek Massacre occurred near Chamberlain. An archeological excavation of the site has discovered 486 bodies buried in a mass grave within a type of fortification; many of the skeletal remains show evidence of scalping and decapitation.

=== Arikara ===
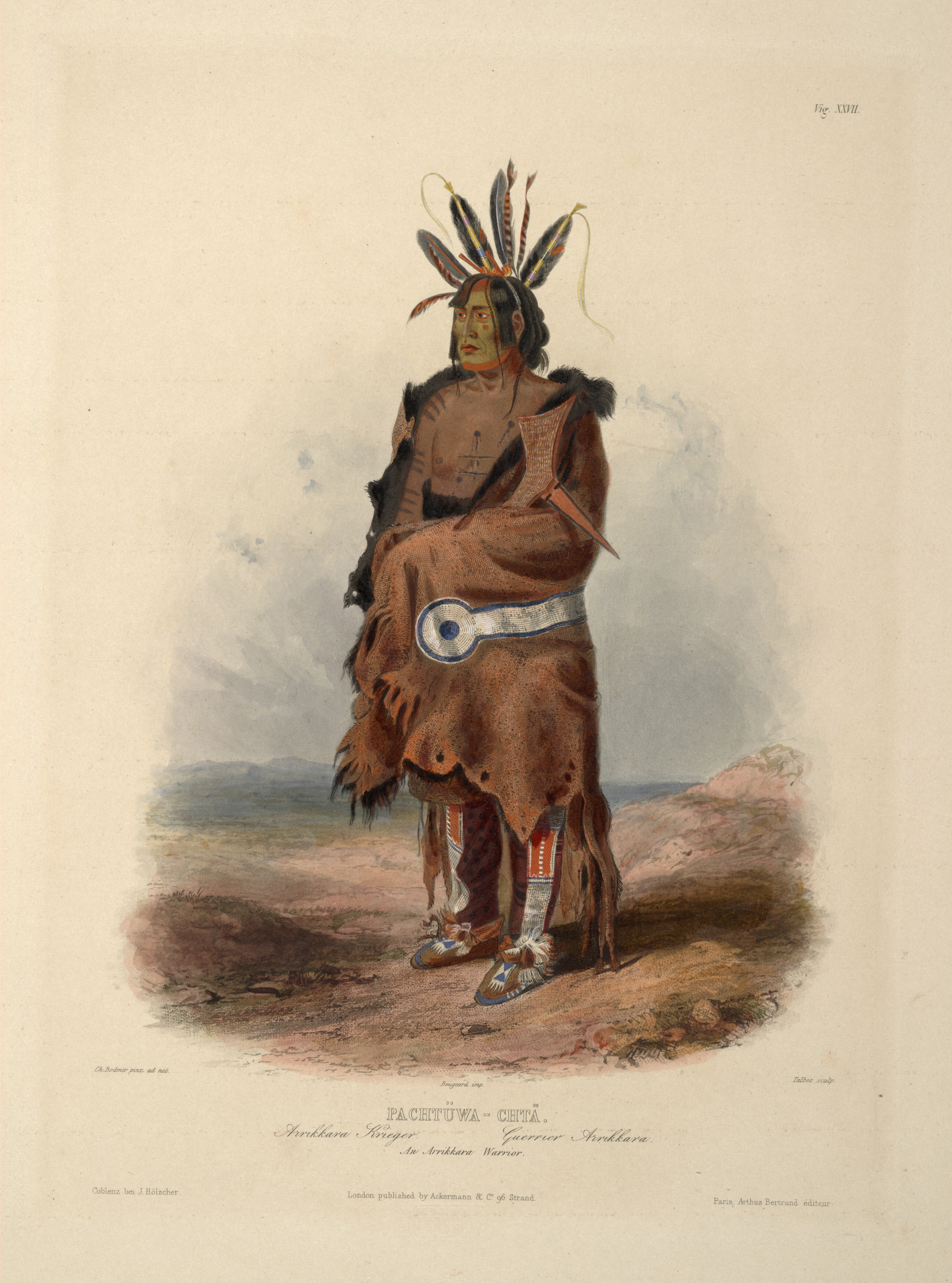
Karl Bodmer's portrait of an Arikara warrior, early 1840s.

The Arikara, also known as the Ree, began arriving from the south in the 16th century. They spoke a Caddoan language similar to that of the Pawnee, and probably originated in what is now Kansas and Nebraska. Although they would at times travel to hunt or trade, the Arikara were far less nomadic than many of their neighbors, and lived for the most part in permanent villages. These villages usually consisted of a stockade enclosing a number of circular earthen lodges built on bluffs looking over the rivers. Each village had a semi-autonomous political structure, with the Arikara's various subtribes being connected in a loose alliance. In addition to hunting and growing crops such as corn, beans, pumpkin and other squash, the Arikara were also skilled traders, and would often serve as intermediaries between tribes to the north and south. It was probably through their trading connections that Spanish horses first reached the region around 1760. The Arikara reached the height of their power in the 17th century, and may have included as many as 32 villages. Due both to disease as well as pressure from other tribes, the number of Arikara villages would decline to only two by the late 18th century, and the Arikara eventually merged entirely with the Mandan to the north.

The sister tribe of the Arikaras, the Pawnee, may have also had a small amount of land in the state. Both were Caddoan and were among the only known tribes in the continental U.S. to have committed human sacrifice, via a religious ritual that occurred once a year. It is said that the U.S. government worked hard to halt this practice before their homelands came to be heavily settled, for fear that the general public might react harshly or refuse to move there.

=== Cheyenne ===
The Lakota Oral histories tell of them driving the Algonquian ancestors of the Cheyenne from the Black Hills regions, south of the Platte River, in the 18th century. Before that, the Cheyenne say that they were, in fact, two tribes, which they call the Tsitsistas & Sutaio After their defeat, much of their territory was contained to southeast Wyoming & western Nebraska. While they had been able to hold off the Sioux for quite some time, they were heavily damaged by a smallpox outbreak. They are also responsible for introducing the horse to the Lakota.

=== Ioway ===
The Ioway, or Iowa people, also inhabited the region where the modern states of South Dakota, Minnesota & Iowa meet, north of the Missouri River. They also had a sister nation, known as the Otoe who lived south of them. They were Chiwere speaking, a very old variation of Siouan language said to have originated amongst the ancestors of the Ho-Chunk of Wisconsin. They also would have had a fairly similar culture to that of the Dhegihan Sioux tribes of Nebraska & Kansas.

=== Sioux ===
The earliest evidence of Sioux American Indian Tribes was recorded by French Priests who went to Wisconsin in the 1640s. The name Sioux came from an enemy, Nadewesiou, of the Ojibwa tribe. The Sioux tribe consisted of three major divisions: Santee, Teton and Yankton. The mother tribe called themselves Dakota; a second tribe split ranging from the Missouri River to the Rockies, becoming Teton; and a smaller group, Yankton, resided between the two. By the 17th century, the Sioux, who made up much of the population, spoke a language of the Siouan language family, and were divided by dialect variations in language, Santee speaking Dakota, Yankton speaking Nakota and the Teton speaking Lakota, all meaning an alliance of friends.

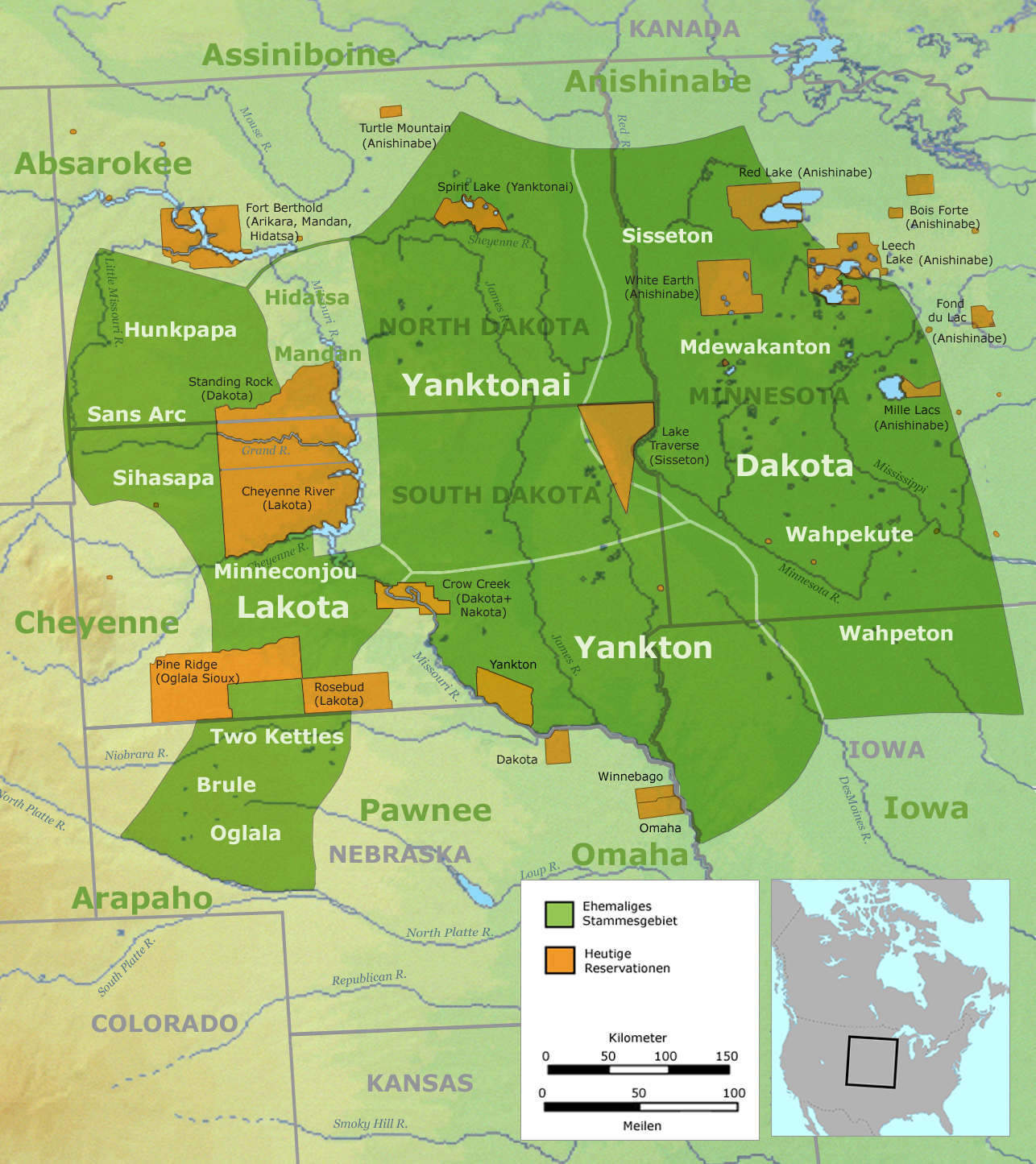
Map showing the general locations of the tribes and subtribes of the Sioux by the late 18th century; current reservations are shown in orange.

In moving west into the prairies, the lifestyle of the Sioux would be greatly altered, coming to resemble that of a nomadic northern plains tribe much more so than a largely settled eastern woodlands one. Characteristics of this transformation include a greater dependence on the bison for food, a heavier reliance on the horse for transportation, and the adoption of the tipi for habitation, a dwelling more suited to the frequent movements of a nomadic people than their earlier semi-permanent lodges.

Once on the plains, a schism caused the two subgroups of the Sioux to divide into three separate nations—the Lakota, who migrated south, the Asiniboine who migrated back east to Minnesota & the remaining Sioux. It appears to be around this time that the Dakota people became more prominent over the Nakota & the entirety of the people came to call themselves as such.

The Lakota, who crossed the Missouri around 1760 and reached the Black Hills by 1776, would come to settle largely in western South Dakota, northwestern Nebraska, and southwestern North Dakota. The Yankton primarily settled in southeastern South Dakota, the Yanktonnais settled in northeastern South Dakota and southeastern North Dakota, and the Santee settled primarily in central and southern Minnesota. Due in large part to the Sioux migrations, a number of tribes would be driven from the area. The tribes in and around the Black Hills, most notably the Cheyenne, would be pushed to the west, the Arikara would move further north along the Missouri, and the Omaha would be driven out of southeastern South Dakota and into northeastern Nebraska.

Later, the Lakota & Assiniboine returned to the fold, forming a single confederacy known as the Oceti Sakowin, or Seven council fire. This was divided into four cultural groups—the Lakota, Dakota, Nakota & Nagoda-- & seven distinct tribes, each with their own chief—the Nakota Mdewakan (Note—Older attempts at Lakota language show a mistake in writing the sound 'bl' as 'md', such as summer, Bloketu, misprinted as mdoketu. Therefore, this word should be Blewakan. ) & Wahpeton, the Dakota Santee & Sisseton, the Nagoda Yankton & Yanktonai & the Lakota Teton. In this form, they were able to secure from the U.S. government a homeland, commonly referred to as Mni-Sota Makoce, or the Lakotah Republic. However, conflicts increased between Sioux & American citizens in the decades leading up the Civil War & a poorly funded & organized Bureau of Indian Affairs had difficulty keeping peace between groups. This eventually resulted in the United States blaming the Sioux for the atrocities & rendering the treaty which recognized the nation of Lakotah null and void. The U.S., however, later recognized their fault in a Supreme Court case in the 1980s after several decades of failed lawsuits by the Sioux, yet little has been done to smooth the issue over to the best interests of both sides.

== European and American exploration (ca. 1740s-1810s) ==
=== France ===
France was the first European nation to hold any real claim over what would become South Dakota. Its claims covered most of the modern state. However, at most a few French scouting parties may have entered eastern South Dakota. In 1679 Daniel G. Duluth sent explorers west from Lake Mille Lacs, and they may have reached Big Stone Lake and the Coteau des Prairies. Pierre Le Sueur's traders entered the Big Sioux River Valley on multiple occasions. Evidence for these journeys is from a 1701 map by William De L'Isle that shows a trail to below the falls of the Big Sioux River from the Mississippi River.

After 1713, France looked west to sustain its fur trade. The first Europeans to enter South Dakota from the north, the Verendrye brothers, began their expedition in 1743. The expedition started at Fort La Reine on Lake Manitoba, and was attempting to locate an all-water route to the Pacific Ocean. They buried a lead plate inscribed near Ft. Pierre; it was rediscovered by schoolchildren in 1913.

=== Spain ===
In 1762, France granted Spain all French territory west of the Mississippi River in the Treaty of Fontainebleau. The agreement, which was signed in secret, was motivated by a French desire to convince Spain to come to terms with Britain and accept defeat in the Seven Years' War. In an attempt to secure Spanish claims in the region against possible encroachment from other European powers, Spain adopted a policy for the upper Missouri which emphasized the development of closer trade relations with local tribes as well as greater exploration of the region, a primary focus of which would be a search for a water route to the Pacific Ocean. Although traders such as Jacques D'Eglise and Juan Munier had been active in the region for several years, these men had been operating independently, and a determined effort to reach the Pacific and solidify Spanish control of the region had never been undertaken. In 1793, a group commonly known as the Missouri Company was formed in St. Louis, with the twin goals of trading and exploring on the upper Missouri. The company sponsored several attempts to reach the Pacific Ocean, none of which made it further than the mouth of the Yellowstone. In 1794, Jean Truteau (also spelled Trudeau) built a cabin near the present-day location of Fort Randall, and in 1795 the Mackay-Evans Expedition traveled up the Missouri as far as present-day North Dakota, where they expelled several British traders who had been active in the area. In 1801, a post known as Fort aux Cedres was constructed by Registre Loisel of St. Louis, on Cedar Island on the Missouri about 35 miles (56 km) southeast of the present location of Pierre. This trading post was the major regional post until its destruction by fire in 1810. In 1800, Spain gave Louisiana back to France in the Treaty of San Ildefonso.

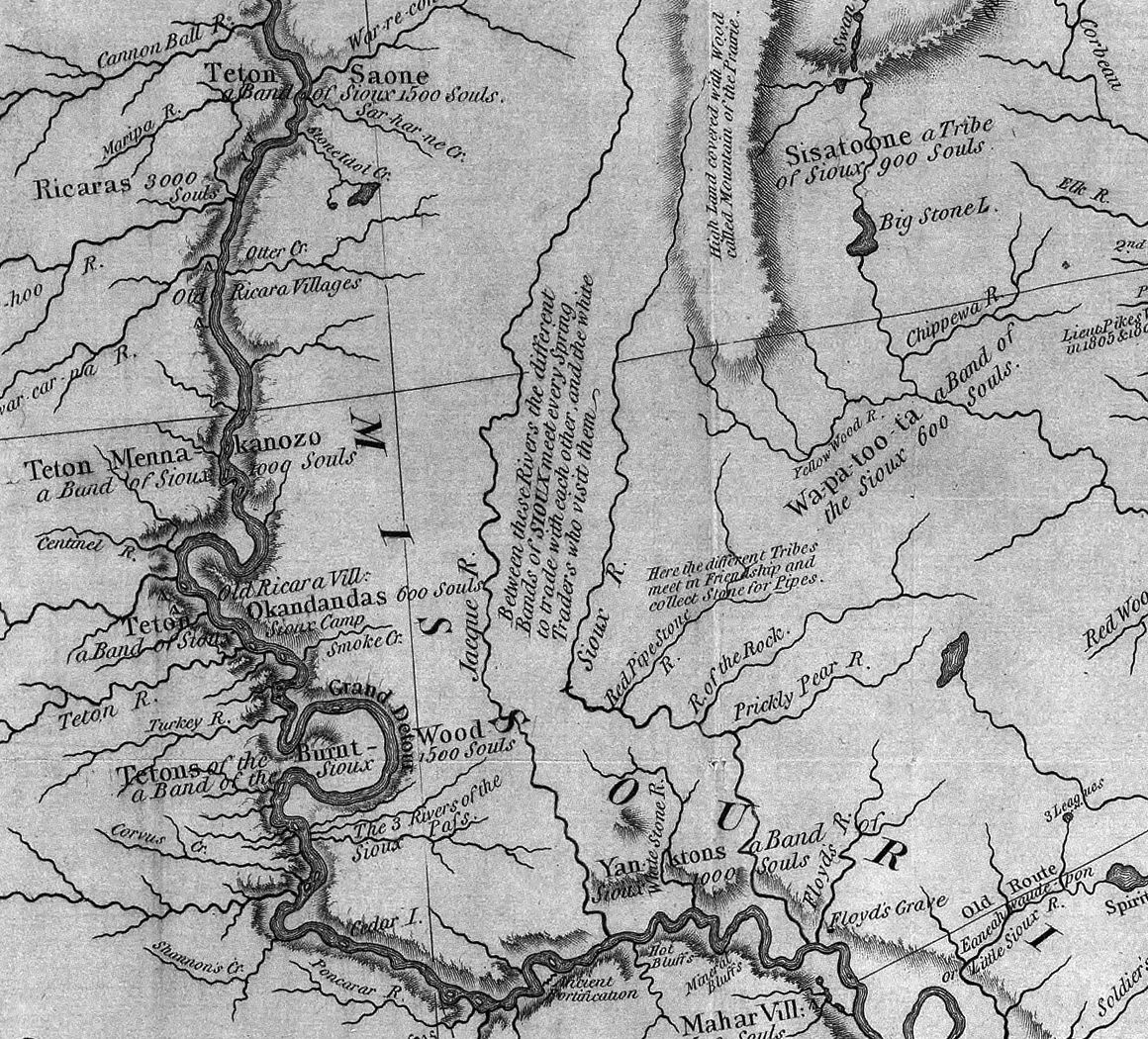
Detail from a map drawn by the Lewis and Clark Expedition, showing much of what would become eastern and central South Dakota.

=== United States ===
In 1803, the United States purchased the Louisiana Territory from Napoleon for $11,000,000. The territory included most of the western half of the Mississippi watershed and covered nearly all of present-day South Dakota, except for a small portion in the northeast corner of the state. The region was still largely unexplored and unsettled, and President Thomas Jefferson organized a group commonly referred to as the Lewis and Clark Expedition to explore the newly acquired region over a period of more than two years. The expedition, also known as the Corps of Discovery, was tasked with following the route of the Missouri to its source, continuing on to the Pacific Ocean, establishing diplomatic relations with the various tribes in the area, and taking cartographic, geologic, and botanical surveys of the area. The expedition left St. Louis on May 14, 1804, with 45 men and 15 tons of supplies in three boats (one keelboat and two pirogues). The party progressed slowly against the Missouri's current, reaching what is today South Dakota on August 22. Near present-day Vermillion, the party hiked to the Spirit Mound after hearing local legends of the place being inhabited by "little spirits" (or "devils"). Shortly after this, a peaceful meeting took place with the Yankton Sioux, while an encounter with the Lakota Sioux further north was not as uneventful. The Lakota mistook the party as traders, at one point stealing a horse. Weapons were brandished on both sides after it appeared as though the Lakota were going to further delay or even halt the expedition, but they eventually stood down and allowed the party to continue up the river and out of their territory. In north central South Dakota, the expedition acted as mediators between the warring Arikara and Mandan. After leaving the state on October 14, the party wintered with the Mandan in North Dakota before successfully reaching the Pacific Ocean and returning by the same route, safely reaching St. Louis in 1806. On the return trip, the expedition spent only 15 days in South Dakota, traveling more swiftly with the Missouri's current.

Pittsburgh lawyer Henry Marie Brackenridge was South Dakota's first recorded tourist. In 1811 he was hosted by fur trader Manuel Lisa.

== Fur trading (ca. 1800-1840s) ==
In 1817, an American fur trading post was set up at present-day Fort Pierre, beginning continuous American settlement of the area. During the 1830s, fur trading was the dominant economic activity for the few white people who lived in the area. More than one hundred fur-trading posts were in present-day South Dakota in the first half of the 19th century, and Fort Pierre was the center of activity. General William Henry Ashley, Andrew Henry, and Jedediah Smith of the Rocky Mountain Fur Company, and Manuel Lisa and Joshua Pilcher of the St. Louis Fur Company, trapped in that region. Pierre Chouteau Jr. brought the steamship Yellowstone to Fort Tecumseh on the Missouri River in 1831. In 1832 the fort was replaced by Fort Pierre Chouteau Jr.: today's town of Fort Pierre. Pierre bought the Western Department of John Jacob Astor's American Fur Company and renamed it Pratte, Chouteau and Company, and then Pierre Chouteau and Company. It operated in present-day South Dakota from 1834 to 1858. Most trappers and traders left the area after European demand for furs dwindled around 1840.

== Territorial Period (1862-1889) ==
=== American settlement ===
In 1855, the U.S. Army bought Fort Pierre but abandoned it the following year in favor of Fort Randall to the south. Settlement by Americans and Europeans was by this time increasing rapidly, and in 1858 the Yankton Sioux signed the 1858 "Treaty of Washington", ceding most of present-day eastern South Dakota to the United States.

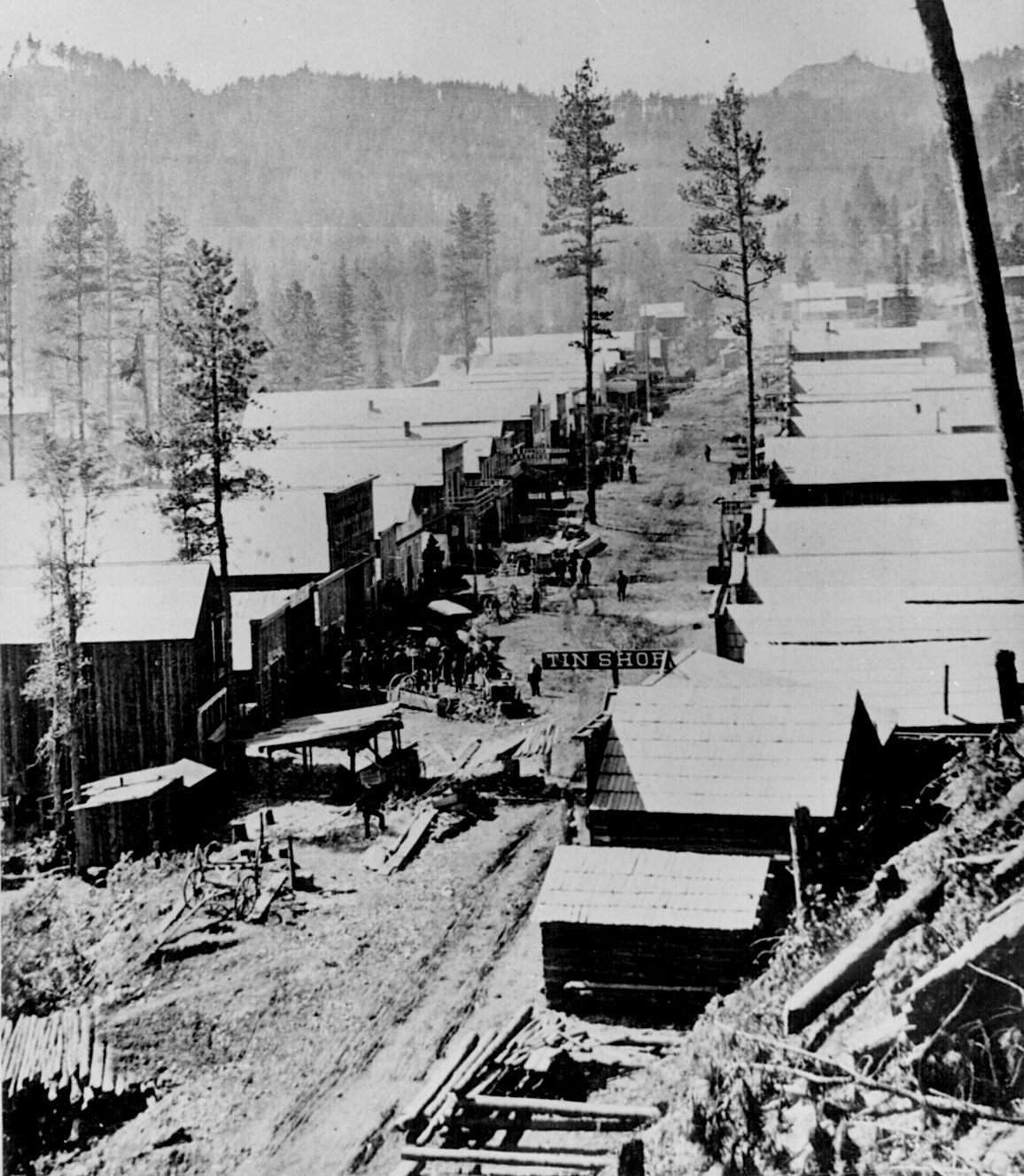
Deadwood, like many other Black Hills towns, was founded after the discovery of gold.

Land speculators founded two of eastern South Dakota's largest present-day cities: Sioux Falls in 1856 and Yankton in 1859. The Big Sioux River falls was the spot of an 1856 settlement established by a Dubuque, Iowa, company; that town was quickly removed by native residents. But in the following year, May 1857, the town was resettled and named Sioux Falls. That June, St. Paul, Minnesota's Dakota Land Company came to an adjacent 320 acres (130 ha), calling it Sioux Falls City. In June 1857, Flandreau and Medary, South Dakota, were established by the Dakota Land Company. Along with Yankton in 1859, Bon Homme, Elk Point, and Vermillion were among the new communities along the Missouri River or border with Minnesota. Settlers therein numbered about 5,000 in 1860. In 1861, Dakota Territory was established by the United States government (this initially included North Dakota, South Dakota, and parts of Montana and Wyoming). Settlers from Scandinavia, Germany, Ireland, Czechoslovakia and Russia, as well as elsewhere in Europe and from the eastern U.S. states increased from a trickle in the 1860s to a flood during the Dakota Boom of the 1870s and '80s, especially after the completion of an eastern railway link to the territorial capital of Yankton in 1872, and the discovery of gold in the Black Hills in 1874 during a military expedition led by George A. Custer.

The Dakota Territory had significant regional tensions between the northern part and the southern part from the beginning, the southern part always being more populated – in the 1880 United States census, the population of the southern part (98,268) was more than two and a half times of the northern part (36,909), and southern Dakotans saw the northern part as bit of disreputable, "controlled by the wild folks, cattle ranchers, fur traders” and too frequently the site of conflict with the indigenous population. Also, the new railroads built connected the northern and southern parts to different hubs – northern part was closer tied to Minneapolis–Saint Paul area; and southern part to Sioux City and from there to Omaha. The last straw was territorial governor Nehemiah G. Ordway moving the territorial capital from Yankton to Bismarck in modern-day North Dakota. As the Southern part had the necessary population for statehood (60,000), they held a separate convention in September 1883 and drafted a constitution. Various bills to divide the Dakota Territory in half ended up stalling, until in 1887, when the Territorial Legislature submitted the question of division to a popular vote at the November general elections, where it was approved by 37,784 votes over 32,913. A bill for statehood for North Dakota and South Dakota (as well as Montana and Washington) titled the Enabling Act of 1889 was passed on February 22, 1889, during the Administration of Grover Cleveland, dividing Dakota along the seventh standard parallel. It was left to his successor, Benjamin Harrison, to sign proclamations formally admitting North and South Dakota to the Union on November 2, 1889. Harrison directed his Secretary of State James G. Blaine to shuffle the papers and obscure from him which he was signing first and the actual order went unrecorded.

=== Indian affairs ===
The national government continued to handle Indian affairs. The Army's 1874 Custer expedition took place despite the fact that the western half of present-day South Dakota had been granted to the Sioux by the Treaty of Fort Laramie as part of the Great Sioux Reservation. The Sioux declined to grant mining rights or land in the Black Hills, and the Great Sioux War of 1876 broke out after the U.S. failed to stop white miners and settlers from entering the region. The Sioux were eventually defeated and settled on reservations within South Dakota and North Dakota.

In 1889 Harrison sent general George Crook with a commission to persuade the Sioux to sell half their reservation land to the government. It was believed that the state would not be viable unless more land was made available to settlers. Crook used a number of dubious methods to secure agreement and obtain the land.

On December 29, 1890, the Wounded Knee Massacre occurred on the Pine Ridge Indian Reservation. It was the last major armed conflict between the United States and the Sioux Nation, the massacre resulted in the deaths of 300 Sioux, many of them women and children. In addition 25 U.S. soldiers were also killed in the episode.

== Early Statehood (1889-1920s) ==
=== Politics ===
With statehood South Dakota was now in a position to make decisions on the major issues it confronted: prohibition, women's suffrage, the location of the state capital, the opening of the Sioux lands for settlement, and the cyclical issues of drought (severe in 1889) and low wheat prices (1893–1896). In early 1889 a prohibition bill passed the new state legislature, only to be vetoed by Governor Louis Church. Fierce opposition came from the wet German community, with financing from beer and liquor interests. The Yankee women organized to demand suffrage, as well as prohibition. Neither party supported their cause, and the wet element counter-organized to block women's suffrage.

Popular interest reached a peak in the debates over locating the state capital. Prestige, real estate values and government jobs were at stake, as well as the question of access in such a large geographical region with limited railroads. Huron was the temporary site, centrally located Pierre was the best organized contender, and three other towns were in the running. Real estate speculators had money to toss around. Pierre, population 3200, made the most generous case to the voters—its promoters truly believed it would be the next Denver and be the railway hub of the Dakotas. The North Western railroad came through but not the others it expected. In 1938 Pierre counted 4000 people and three small hotels.

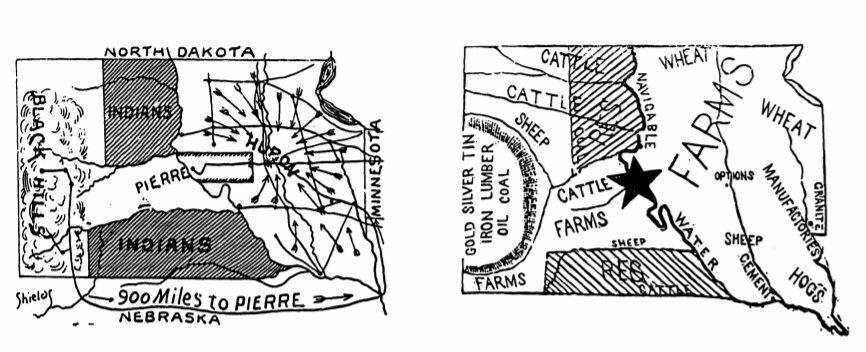
Huron (left) and Pierre (right) issued rival maps that claimed each as the best place voters should choose for the new state capital in 1890.

=== Railroads and western expansion ===
Railroads played a central role in South Dakota transportation from the late 19th century until the 1930s, when they were surpassed by highways. The Milwaukee Road and the Chicago & North Western were the state's largest railroads, and the Milwaukee's east–west transcontinental line traversed the northern tier of the state. About 4,420 miles (7,110 km) of railroad track were built in South Dakota during the late nineteenth and early twentieth centuries, though only 1,839 miles (2,960 km) were active in 2007.

The railroads sold land to prospective farmers at very low rates, expecting to make a profit by shipping farm products out and home goods in. They also set up small towns that would serve as shipping points and commercial centers, and attract businessmen and more farmers. The Minneapolis and St. Louis Railway (M&StL) in 1905, under the leadership of vice president and general manager L. F. Day, added lines from Watertown to LeBeau and from Conde through Aberdeen to Leola. It developed town sites along the new lines and by 1910, the new lines served 35 small communities.

Not all of the new towns survived. The M&StL situated LeBeau along the Missouri River on the eastern edge of the Cheyenne River Indian Reservation. The new town was a hub for the cattle and grain industries. Livestock valued at one million dollars were shipped out in 1908, and the rail company planned a bridge across the Missouri River. Allotment of the Cheyenne River Reservation in 1909 promised further growth. By the early 1920s, however, troubles multiplied, with the murder of a local rancher, a fire that destroyed the business district, and drought that ruined ranchers and farmers alike. LeBeau became a ghost town.

Most of the traffic was freight, but the main lines also offered passenger service. After the European immigrants settled, there never were many people moving about inside the state. Profits were slim. Automobiles and busses were much more popular, but there was an increase during World War II when gasoline was scarce. All passenger service was ended in the state by 1969.

=== Retail ===
In the rural areas farmers and ranchers depended on local general stores that had a limited stock and slow turnover; they made enough profit to stay in operation by selling at high prices. Prices were not marked on each item; instead the customer negotiated a price. Men did most of the shopping, since the main criterion was credit rather than quality of goods. Indeed, most customers shopped on credit, paying off the bill when crops or cattle were later sold; the owner's ability to judge credit worthiness was vital to his success.

In the cities consumers had much more choice, and bought their dry goods and supplies at locally owned department stores. They had a much wider selection of goods than in the country general stores and price tags that gave the actual selling price. The department stores provided a very limited credit, and set up attractive displays and, after 1900, window displays as well. Their clerks—usually men before the 1940s—were experienced salesmen whose knowledge of the products appealed to the better educated middle-class housewives who did most of the shopping. The keys to success were a large variety of high-quality brand-name merchandise, high turnover, reasonable prices, and frequent special sales. The larger stores sent their buyers to Denver, Minneapolis, and Chicago once or twice a year to evaluate the newest trends in merchandising and stock up on the latest fashions. By the 1920s and 1930s, large mail-order houses such as Sears, Roebuck & Co. and Montgomery Ward provided serious competition, making the department stores rely even more on salesmanship and close integration with the community.

Many entrepreneurs built stores, shops, and offices along Main Street. The most handsome ones used pre-formed, sheet iron facades, especially those manufactured by the Mesker Brothers of St. Louis. These neoclassical, stylized facades added sophistication to brick or wood-frame buildings throughout the state.

== Dust bowl and Depression (1930s) ==
During the 1930s, several economic and climatic conditions combined with disastrous results for South Dakota. A lack of rainfall, extremely high temperatures and over-cultivation of farmland produced what was known as the Dust Bowl in South Dakota and several other plains states. Fertile topsoil was blown away in massive dust storms, and several harvests were completely ruined. The experiences of the Dust Bowl, coupled with local bank foreclosures and the general economic effects of the Great Depression resulted in many South Dakotans leaving the state. The population of South Dakota declined by more than seven percent between 1930 and 1940.

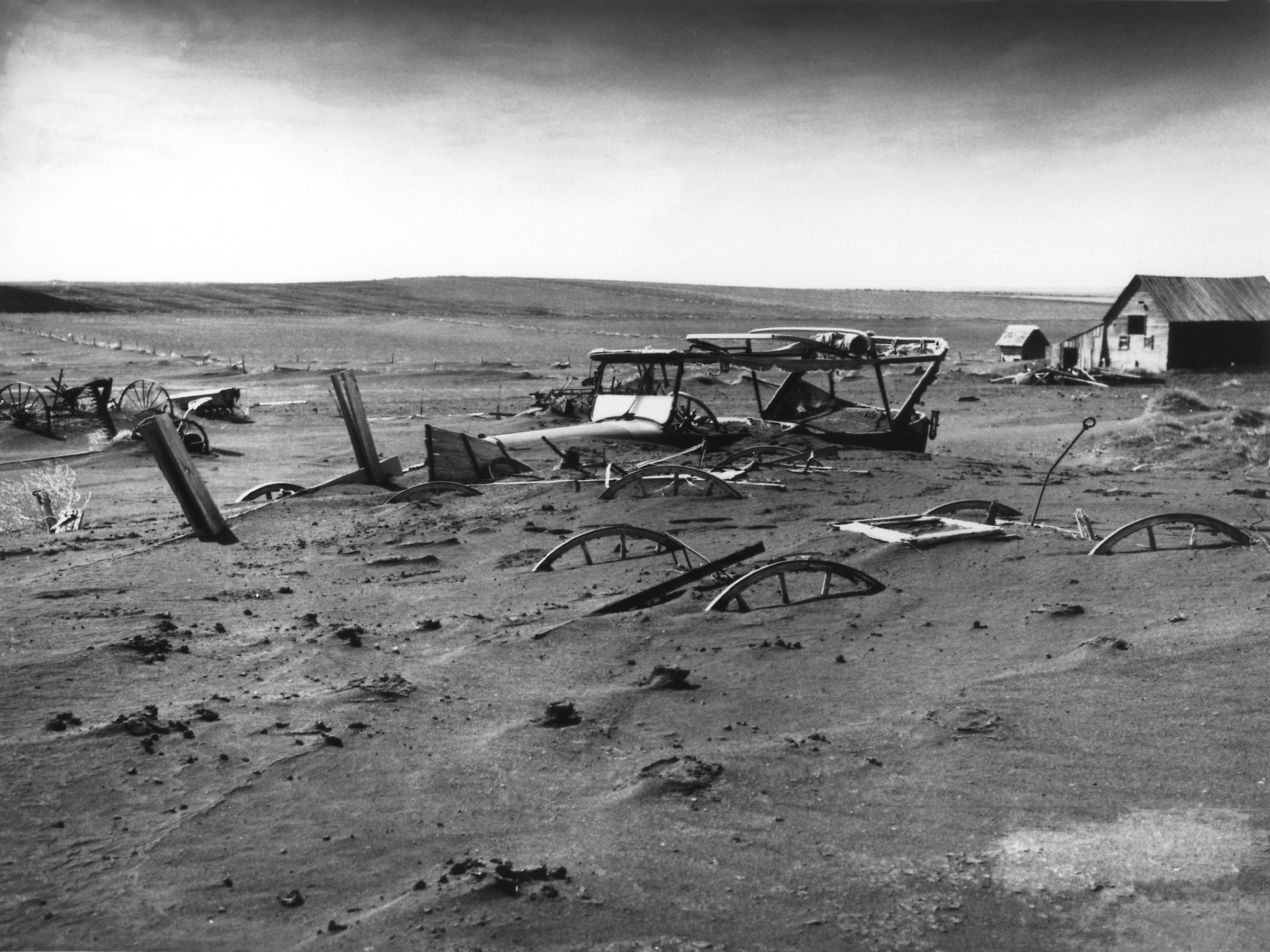
A South Dakota farm during the Dust Bowl, 1936

== World War II and the modern era (1941-Present) ==
Prosperity returned with the U.S. entry into World War II in 1941, when demand for the state's agricultural and industrial products grew as the nation mobilized for war. Over 68,000 South Dakotans served in the armed forces during the war, of which over 2,200 were killed.

In 1944, the Pick-Sloan Plan was passed as part of the Flood Control Act of 1944 by the U.S. Congress, resulting in the construction of six large dams on the Missouri River, four of which are at least partially located in South Dakota. Flood control, hydroelectricity and recreational opportunities such as boating and fishing are provided by the dams and their reservoirs. While beneficial for some, the dams resulted in significant flooding in the areas north of the dams, forcing many individuals to relocate from prime river-front areas. Much of the negative impact was borne by the American Indian people who lived on reservations that bordered the river.

On the night of June 9–10, 1972, heavy rainfall in the eastern Black Hills caused the Canyon Lake Dam on Rapid Creek to fail. The failure of the dam, combined with heavy runoff from the storm, turned the usually small creek into a massive torrent that washed through central Rapid City. The flood resulted in 238 deaths and destroyed 1,335 homes and around 5,000 automobiles. Damage from the flood totaled $160 million (the equivalent of $664 million today).

On April 19, 1993, Governor George S. Mickelson was killed in a plane crash in Iowa while returning from a business meeting in Cincinnati. Several other state officials were also killed in the crash. Mickelson, who was in the middle of his second term as governor, was succeeded by Walter Dale Miller.

=== Changing industries ===
In recent decades, South Dakota has transformed from a state dominated by agriculture to one with a more diversified economy. The tourism industry has grown considerably since the completion of the interstate system in the 1960s, with the Black Hills being especially impacted. The financial service industry began to grow in the state as well, with Citibank moving its credit card operations from New York to Sioux Falls in 1981, a move that has since been followed by several other financial companies. In 2007, the site of the recently closed Homestake gold mine near Lead was chosen as the location of a new underground research facility. Despite a growing state population and recent economic development, many rural areas have been struggling over the past 50 years with locally declining populations and the emigration of educated young adults to larger South Dakota cities, such as Rapid City or Sioux Falls, or to other states. The Cattleman's Blizzard of October 2013 killed tens of thousands of livestock in western South Dakota, and was one of the worst blizzards in the state's history.

== See also ==
- History of the Midwestern United States
- Railroad land grants in the United States
- Territorial evolution of South Dakota
- Timeline of South Dakota
- Timeline of Sioux Falls, South Dakota
- Women's suffrage in South Dakota

== Bibliography and further reading ==
- Alexander, Ruth Ann. “Women in South Dakota Missions.” Anglican and Episcopal History 63#3 (1994), pp. 334–62. online
- Boettcher, Susan E., and W. Carter Johnson. "Restoring the pre-settlement landscape in Stanley County, South Dakota." Great Plains Research (1997): 27–40. online
- Dagel, Kenneth Charles. "Ranchers' adjustments to drought in western South Dakota, 1870–1990s: Creating sustainable operations in a marginal environment" (The University of Nebraska-Lincoln, 1994) online.
- Deloria, Philip J.; Salisbury, Neal, eds. (2004). A Companion to American Indian History. Oxford: Wiley-Blackwell. ISBN 1-4051-2131-9.
- Egge, Sara. "Responsible Citizens: Comparing Woman Suffrage in Arizona and South Dakota." Journal of Arizona History 61.2 (2020): 225–230. online
- Ericksen, Neil J. “A Tale of Two Cities: Flood History and the Prophetic Past of Rapid City, South Dakota.” Economic Geography 51#4 (1975), pp. 305–20. online
- Federal Writers' Project, A South Dakota Guide (1938, 1993 reprint)
- Fite, Gilbert C. "South Dakota's Rural Credit System: A Venture in State Socialism, 1917–1946." Agricultural History 21.4 (1947): 239–249 online.
- Fite, Gilbert C. "Peter Norbeck and the Defeat of the Nonpartisan League in South Dakota." Mississippi Valley Historical Review 33.2 (1946): 217–236. online
- Hasselstrom, Linda M. (1994). Roadside History of South Dakota. Missoula, MT: Mountain Press Publishing Company. ISBN 0-87842-262-5.
- Heefner, Gretchen. “Missiles and Memory: Dismantling South Dakota’s Cold War.” Western Historical Quarterly 38#2 (2007), pp. 181–203. online
- Hoglund, C. R., and M. Bruce Johnson. "Ranching in Northwestern South Dakota." (1947). online
- Holder, Preston (1974). The Hoe and the Horse on the Plains: A Study of Cultural Development Among North American Indians. Lincoln, NE: University of Nebraska Press. ISBN 0-8032-5809-7.
- Hoheisel, Tim. “Razing the Past in South Dakota.” History News 57#4 (2002), pp. 5–8. online
- Howe, Jenika. "Power in the pasture: Energy and the history of ranching in western South Dakota" (Diss. Colorado State University, 2012) online
- Karolevitz, Robert F. Challenge: The South Dakota Story (Brevet Press, 1975)
- Kumlien, Wendell Frichiof, and Howard M. Sauer. "Population Migration To and from South Dakota: 1930–1940." (1940) online.
- Lauck, Jon, et al. The Plains Political Tradition: Essays on South Dakota Political Tradition (South Dakota State Historical Society Press, 2011).
- Lindell, Lisa R. " 'So Long as I Can Read': Farm Women’s Reading Experiences in Depression-Era South Dakota” Agricultural History 83#4 (2009), pp. 503–27. online
- Lundy, Gabriel. "Graphic Views of Changes in South Dakota Agriculture." (1949) online.
- Maier, Chris. "The Farmers' Fight for Representation: Third-Party Politics in South Dakota, 1889–1918." Great Plains Quarterly 34.2 (2014): 143–162. excerpt
- Miller, John E. “Restrained, Respectable Radicals: The South Dakota Farm Holiday.” Agricultural History 59#3 (1985), pp. 429–47. online in 1932.
- Nelson, Paula M. The Prairie Winnows Out Its Own: The West River Country of South Dakota in the Years of Depression and Dust (University of Iowa Press, 2005) excerpt.
- Petheram, Vera, and W. F. Kumlien. "Population Changes in South Dakota." (1940). online
- Pratt, William C. "Rethinking the Farm Revolt of the 1930s." Great Plains Quarterly (1988): 131–144. online
- Ronda, James P. (2002). Lewis and Clark Among the Indians. Lincoln, NE: University of Nebraska Press. ISBN 0-8032-8990-1.
- Schell, Herbert S. (2004). History of South Dakota. Pierre, SD: South Dakota State Historical Society Press. ISBN 0-9715171-3-4.
- Schwieder, Dorothy Hubbard. Growing Up with the Town: Family and Community on the Great Plains (2003) Memoir plus history of Presho, South Dakota, 1905 to the 1950s; a primary source. details
- Thompson, Harry F., ed. (2009). A New South Dakota History (Second ed.). Sioux Falls, SD: Center for Western Studies – Augustana College. ISBN 978-0-931170-00-3.
- Urton, Harold E. "History of vocational agriculture in South Dakota high schools, 1917–1940." (1943) online.
