= List of United States federal courthouses in South Dakota =

Following is a list of current and former courthouses of the United States federal court system located in South Dakota. Each entry indicates the name of the building along with an image, if available, its location and the jurisdiction it covers, the dates during which it was used for each such jurisdiction, and, if applicable the person for whom it was named, and the date of renaming. Dates of use will not necessarily correspond with the dates of construction or demolition of a building, as pre-existing structures may be adapted or court use, and former court buildings may later be put to other uses. Also, the official name of the building may be changed at some point after its use as a federal court building has been initiated.

== Courthouses ==
Courthouse	City	Image	Street address	Jurisdiction	Dates of use	Named for
U.S. Post Office	Aberdeen		4th Avenue Southeast & South Lincoln Street	D.S.D.	1904–1937; Demolished.	n/a
U.S. Post Office & Court House^{†}	Aberdeen		102 4th Avenue Southeast	D.S.D.	1937–present	n/a
U.S. Post Office & Court House	Deadwood		68 Sherman Street	D.S.D.	1907–? Still in use as a post office.	n/a
U.S. Post Office & Court House	Pierre		118 West Capitol Avenue	D.S.D.	1906–1965; Now in use by various state agencies.	n/a
Pierre Federal Building, U.S. Post Office and Courthouse	Pierre		225 South Pierre Street	D.S.D.	1965–present	n/a
Andrew W. Bogue Federal Building & U.S. Courthouse	Rapid City		515 Ninth Street	D.S.D.	1973–present	District Court judge Andrew Wendell Bogue (2011)
Federal Building & U.S. Courthouse^{†}	Sioux Falls		400 South Phillips Avenue	D.S.D.	1895–present	n/a

== Key ==
^{†}	Listed on the National Register of Historic Places (NRHP)
^{††}	NRHP-listed and also designated as a National Historic Landmark
