= List of federal judges appointed by Joe Biden =

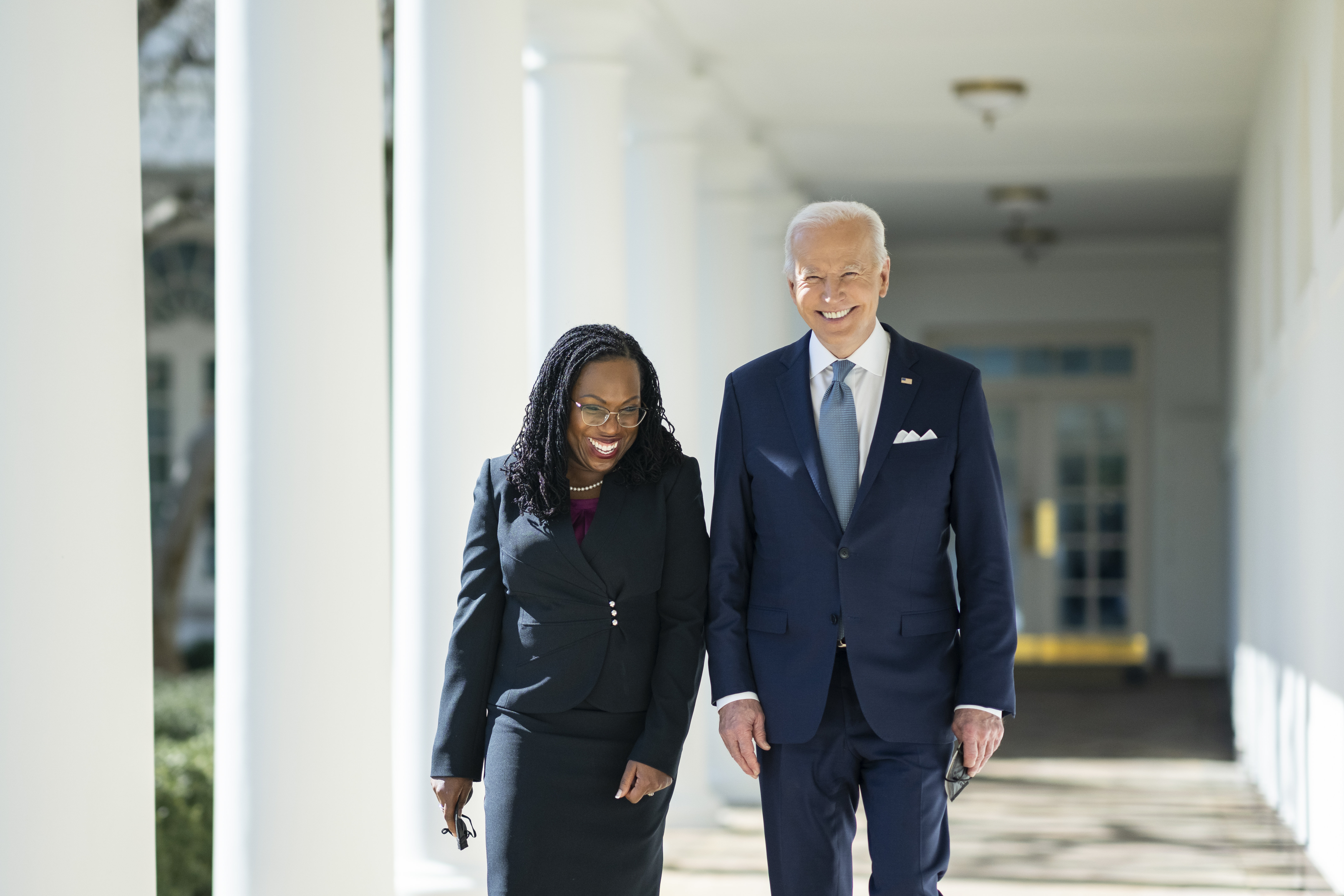
Joe Biden with his then-Supreme Court nominee, Ketanji Brown Jackson

This is a comprehensive list of all Article III and Article IV United States federal judges appointed by President Joe Biden, as well as a partial list of Article I federal judicial appointments, excluding appointments to the District of Columbia judiciary.

The total number of Article III judges nominated by Biden and confirmed by the United States Senate was 235, including one associate justice of the Supreme Court of the United States, 45 judges for the United States courts of appeals, 187 judges for the United States district courts and two judges for the United States Court of International Trade.

In terms of Article I courts, Biden appointed 17 judges: five to the United States Court of Federal Claims, five to the United States Court of Military Commission Review, one to the United States Court of Appeals for the Armed Forces and six to the United States Tax Court. On March 2, 2021, Biden designated Elaine D. Kaplan as chief judge of the Court of Federal Claims.

On the Article IV territorial courts, Biden made one appointment.

== Supreme Court of the United States ==
#	Justice	Seat	State	Former justice	Nomination date	Confirmation date	Confirmation vote	Began service (Note: Although under the Judiciary Act a judge must take the judicial oath "before performing the duties of his office", this article uses the date they receive their commission as the date they begin service because this information is readily available from the Federal Judicial Center. When a judge receives their commission and takes their judicial oath on different days, this will result in inconsistencies with other articles.)	Ended service
1	Ketanji Brown Jackson	2	Washington, D.C.	Stephen Breyer	February 28, 2022	April 7, 2022	53–47	June 30, 2022 (Note: The Federal Judicial Center notes that Jackson received her commission on April 8, 2022, however, Justice Stephen Breyer did not assume senior status until noon on June 30, 2022, at which time Jackson took her constitutional and judicial oaths soon after.)	Incumbent

== United States courts of appeals ==
#	Judge	Circuit	Nomination date	Confirmation date	Confirmation vote	Began active service	Ended active service	Ended senior status
1	Ketanji Brown Jackson	D.C.	April 19, 2021	June 14, 2021	53–44	June 17, 2021	June 29, 2022	Elevated
2	Candace Jackson-Akiwumi	Seventh	April 19, 2021	June 24, 2021	53–40	July 1, 2021	Incumbent	–
3	Tiffany P. Cunningham	Federal	April 19, 2021	July 19, 2021	63–33	August 6, 2021	Incumbent	–
4	Eunice C. Lee	Second	May 12, 2021	August 7, 2021	50–47	August 16, 2021	Incumbent	–
5	Veronica S. Rossman	Tenth	May 12, 2021	September 20, 2021	50–42	September 28, 2021	Incumbent	–
6	Gustavo Gelpí	First	May 12, 2021	October 18, 2021	52–41	October 19, 2021	Incumbent	–
7	Myrna Pérez	Second	June 15, 2021	October 25, 2021	48–43	November 12, 2021	Incumbent	–
8	Beth Robinson	Second	August 5, 2021	November 1, 2021	51–45	November 5, 2021	Incumbent	–
9	Toby J. Heytens	Fourth	July 13, 2021	November 1, 2021	53–43	November 2, 2021	Incumbent	–
10	Lucy Koh	Ninth	September 20, 2021 (Note: Originally nominated on February 25, 2016, by President Obama. That nomination expired on January 3, 2017. Renominated by President Biden to a different seat on the same court on September 20, 2021.)	December 13, 2021	50–45	December 14, 2021	Incumbent	–
11	Jennifer Sung	Ninth	July 13, 2021	December 15, 2021	50–49	December 20, 2021	Incumbent	–
12	Gabriel P. Sanchez	Ninth	September 20, 2021	January 12, 2022	52–47	January 24, 2022	Incumbent	–
13	Holly A. Thomas	Ninth	September 20, 2021	January 20, 2022	48–40	January 24, 2022	Incumbent	–
14	Leonard P. Stark	Federal	November 3, 2021 (Note: Initial nomination was returned on January 3, 2022. Subsequently renominated the same day.)	February 9, 2022	61–35	March 16, 2022	Incumbent	–
15	Alison Nathan	Second	November 18, 2021	March 23, 2022	49–47	March 30, 2022	Incumbent	–
16	Stephanie D. Davis	Sixth	February 2, 2022	May 24, 2022	49–43	June 14, 2022	Incumbent	–
17	J. Michelle Childs	D.C.	January 10, 2022	July 19, 2022	64–34	July 25, 2022	Incumbent	–
18	Roopali Desai	Ninth	June 15, 2022	August 4, 2022	67–29	October 3, 2022	Incumbent	–
19	John Z. Lee	Seventh	April 25, 2022	September 7, 2022	50–44	September 9, 2022	Incumbent	–
20	Andre Mathis	Sixth	November 18, 2021	September 8, 2022	48–47	September 27, 2022	Incumbent	–
21	Salvador Mendoza Jr.	Ninth	April 25, 2022	September 12, 2022	46–40	September 15, 2022	Incumbent	–
22	Lara Montecalvo	First	May 19, 2022	September 14, 2022	52–47	September 20, 2022	Incumbent	–
23	Sarah A. L. Merriam	Second	May 19, 2022	September 15, 2022	53–44	September 23, 2022	Incumbent	–
24	Florence Y. Pan	D.C.	May 25, 2022	September 20, 2022	52–42	September 26, 2022	Incumbent	–
25	Arianna J. Freeman	Third	January 19, 2022	September 29, 2022	50–47	October 20, 2022	Incumbent	–
26	Doris Pryor	Seventh	May 25, 2022	December 5, 2022	60–31	December 9, 2022	Incumbent	–
27	Tamika Montgomery-Reeves	Third	July 11, 2022	December 12, 2022	53–35	February 7, 2023	Incumbent	–
28	Dana Douglas	Fifth	June 15, 2022	December 13, 2022	65–31	December 16, 2022	Incumbent	–
29	DeAndrea G. Benjamin	Fourth	September 6, 2022 (Note: Initial nomination was returned on January 3, 2023. Subsequently renominated the same day.)	February 9, 2023	53–44	February 21, 2023	Incumbent	–
30	Cindy K. Chung	Third	July 12, 2022	February 13, 2023	50–44	February 21, 2023	Incumbent	–
31	Maria Araújo Kahn	Second	August 1, 2022	March 9, 2023	51–42	March 10, 2023	Incumbent	–
32	Anthony Johnstone	Ninth	September 6, 2022	May 1, 2023	49–45	May 5, 2023	Incumbent	–
33	Brad Garcia	D.C.	June 15, 2022	May 15, 2023	53–40	May 16, 2023	Incumbent	–
34	Nancy Abudu	Eleventh	January 10, 2022	May 18, 2023	49–47	May 26, 2023	Incumbent	–
35	Julie Rikelman	First	August 1, 2022	June 20, 2023	51–43	June 23, 2023	Incumbent	–
36	Rachel Bloomekatz	Sixth	May 25, 2022	July 18, 2023	50–48	July 20, 2023	Incumbent	–
37	Ana de Alba	Ninth	April 17, 2023	November 13, 2023	48–43	November 15, 2023	Incumbent	–
38	Irma Carrillo Ramirez	Fifth	April 17, 2023	December 4, 2023	80–12	December 8, 2023	Incumbent	–
39	Richard Federico	Tenth	July 27, 2023	December 11, 2023	61–29	December 13, 2023	Incumbent	–
40	Joshua P. Kolar	Seventh	July 27, 2023 (Note: Initial nomination was returned on January 3, 2024. Subsequently renominated on January 8, 2024.)	January 30, 2024	66–25	January 31, 2024	Incumbent	–
41	Nicole Berner	Fourth	November 27, 2023	March 19, 2024	50–47	March 19, 2024	Incumbent	–
42	Seth Aframe	First	October 4, 2023	May 20, 2024	49–40	May 23, 2024	Incumbent	–
43	Nancy L. Maldonado	Seventh	February 27, 2024	July 8, 2024	47–43	July 11, 2024	Incumbent	–
44	Kevin G. Ritz	Sixth	March 21, 2024	September 16, 2024	48–46	September 19, 2024	Incumbent	–
45	Embry Kidd	Eleventh	May 14, 2024	November 18, 2024	49–45	January 2, 2025	Incumbent	–

== United States district courts ==
#	Judge	Court (Note: See List of United States district and territorial courts)	Nomination date	Confirmation date	Confirmation vote	Began active service	Ended active service	Ended senior status
1	Julien Neals	D.N.J.	April 19, 2021 (Note: Originally nominated on February 26, 2015, by President Obama. That nomination expired on January 3, 2017. Renominated by President Biden to a different seat on the same court on April 19, 2021.)	June 8, 2021	66–33	June 22, 2021	Incumbent	–
2	Regina M. Rodriguez	D. Colo.	April 19, 2021 (Note: Originally nominated on April 28, 2016, by President Obama. That nomination expired on January 3, 2017. Renominated by President Biden to a different seat on the same court on April 19, 2021.)	June 8, 2021	72–28	July 1, 2021	Incumbent	–
3	Zahid Quraishi	D.N.J.	April 19, 2021	June 10, 2021	81–16	June 22, 2021	Incumbent	–
4	Lydia Griggsby	D. Md.	April 19, 2021	June 16, 2021	59–39	July 20, 2021	Incumbent	–
5	Deborah Boardman	D. Md.	April 19, 2021	June 23, 2021	52–48	June 25, 2021	Incumbent	–
6	David Estudillo	W.D. Wash.	April 29, 2021	September 14, 2021	54–41	October 7, 2021	Incumbent	–
7	Angel Kelley	D. Mass.	May 12, 2021	September 14, 2021	52–44	September 15, 2021	Incumbent	–
8	Margaret Strickland	D.N.M.	April 19, 2021	September 21, 2021	52–45	October 22, 2021	Incumbent	–
9	Florence Y. Pan	D.D.C.	June 15, 2021	September 23, 2021	68–30	September 23, 2021	September 28, 2022	Elevated
10	Lauren J. King	W.D. Wash.	May 12, 2021	October 5, 2021	55–44	December 7, 2021	Incumbent	–
11	Sarah A. L. Merriam	D. Conn.	June 15, 2021	October 6, 2021	54–46	October 8, 2021	September 28, 2022	Elevated
12	Christine O'Hearn	D.N.J.	April 29, 2021	October 19, 2021	53–44	October 22, 2021	Incumbent	–
13	Tana Lin	W.D. Wash.	April 29, 2021	October 21, 2021	52–45	November 23, 2021	Incumbent	–
14	Jia M. Cobb	D.D.C.	June 15, 2021	October 26, 2021	52–45	November 12, 2021	Incumbent	–
15	Karen M. Williams	D.N.J.	May 12, 2021	October 26, 2021	56–38	November 1, 2021	Incumbent	–
16	Patricia Tolliver Giles	E.D. Va.	July 13, 2021	October 26, 2021	68–27	November 1, 2021	Incumbent	–
17	Michael S. Nachmanoff	E.D. Va.	July 13, 2021	October 27, 2021	52–46	November 2, 2021	Incumbent	–
18	Sarala Nagala	D. Conn.	June 15, 2021	October 27, 2021	52–46	November 2, 2021	Incumbent	–
19	Omar A. Williams	D. Conn.	June 15, 2021	October 28, 2021	52–46	November 12, 2021	Incumbent	–
20	Samantha D. Elliott	D.N.H.	September 30, 2021	December 15, 2021	62–37	December 21, 2021	Incumbent	–
21	Linda Lopez	S.D. Cal.	September 30, 2021	December 17, 2021	48–25	December 21, 2021	Incumbent	–
22	Jinsook Ohta	S.D. Cal.	September 30, 2021	December 17, 2021	47–24	December 27, 2021	Incumbent	–
23	David H. Urias	D.N.M.	September 20, 2021	December 17, 2021	45–26	January 14, 2022	Incumbent	–
24	Maame Frimpong	C.D. Cal.	September 20, 2021	December 17, 2021	46–24	February 7, 2022	Incumbent	–
25	Jane M. Beckering	W.D. Mich.	July 13, 2021	December 17, 2021	45–25	December 21, 2021	Incumbent	–
26	Shalina D. Kumar	E.D. Mich.	July 13, 2021	December 17, 2021	44–25	December 21, 2021	Incumbent	–
27	Jennifer L. Thurston	E.D. Cal.	September 20, 2021	December 17, 2021	46–24	December 27, 2021	Incumbent	–
28	Katherine M. Menendez	D. Minn.	September 20, 2021	December 18, 2021	49–21	December 21, 2021	Incumbent	–
29	Mary Dimke	E.D. Wash.	August 5, 2021	December 18, 2021	47–23	December 21, 2021	Incumbent	–
30	Bridget M. Brennan	N.D. Ohio	September 30, 2021	February 1, 2022	61–35	February 8, 2022	Incumbent	–
31	Charles E. Fleming	N.D. Ohio	September 30, 2021	February 1, 2022	56–42	February 8, 2022	Incumbent	–
32	David A. Ruiz	N.D. Ohio	September 30, 2021	February 1, 2022	62–35	February 8, 2022	Incumbent	–
33	Jacqueline Scott Corley	N.D. Cal.	November 3, 2021	March 17, 2022	63–36	March 30, 2022	Incumbent	–
34	Fred W. Slaughter	C.D. Cal.	December 15, 2021	March 17, 2022	57–41	April 19, 2022	Incumbent	–
35	Ruth Bermudez Montenegro	S.D. Cal.	November 3, 2021	March 22, 2022	55–41	March 30, 2022	Incumbent	–
36	Victoria Calvert	N.D. Ga.	September 30, 2021	March 22, 2022	50–46	April 5, 2022	Incumbent	–
37	Julie Rubin	D. Md.	November 3, 2021	March 23, 2022	51–46	March 30, 2022	Incumbent	–
38	Hector Gonzalez	E.D.N.Y.	December 15, 2021 (Note: Originally nominated on September 8, 2020, by President Trump. That nomination expired on January 3, 2021. Renominated by President Biden on December 15, 2021.)	March 23, 2022	52–45	April 18, 2022	Incumbent	–
39	John H. Chun	W.D. Wash.	September 30, 2021	March 23, 2022	49–47	March 30, 2022	Incumbent	–
40	Cristina D. Silva	D. Nev.	November 3, 2021	March 23, 2022	50–46	April 7, 2022	Incumbent	–
41	Anne Traum	D. Nev.	November 3, 2021 (Note: Originally nominated on April 28, 2016, by President Obama. That nomination expired on January 3, 2017. Renominated by President Biden on November 3, 2021. That nomination was returned on January 3, 2022. Subsequently renominated that same day.)	March 23, 2022	49–47	April 7, 2022	Incumbent	–
42	Sarah Geraghty	N.D. Ga.	September 30, 2021	March 31, 2022	52–48	April 8, 2022	Incumbent	–
43	Georgette Castner	D.N.J.	November 3, 2021	March 31, 2022	52–47	April 5, 2022	Incumbent	–
44	Sherilyn Peace Garnett	C.D. Cal.	December 15, 2021	April 27, 2022	62–33	June 24, 2022	Incumbent	–
45	Jennifer L. Rochon	S.D.N.Y.	December 15, 2021	May 18, 2022	51–47	June 13, 2022	Incumbent	–
46	Trina Thompson	N.D. Cal.	November 3, 2021	May 18, 2022	51–44	August 5, 2022	Incumbent	–
47	Sunshine Sykes	C.D. Cal.	December 15, 2021	May 18, 2022	51–45	June 14, 2022	Incumbent	–
48	Evelyn Padin	D.N.J.	December 15, 2021	May 25, 2022	51–43	June 24, 2022	Incumbent	–
49	Charlotte Sweeney	D. Colo.	August 5, 2021	May 25, 2022	48–46	July 18, 2022	Incumbent	–
50	Nina Morrison	E.D.N.Y.	December 15, 2021	June 8, 2022	53–46	August 11, 2022	Incumbent	–
51	Robert S. Huie	S.D. Cal.	January 19, 2022	June 9, 2022	51–46	June 14, 2022	Incumbent	–
52	Ana de Alba	E.D. Cal.	January 19, 2022	June 21, 2022	53–45	July 7, 2022	November 16, 2023	Elevated
53	Stephen H. Locher	S.D. Iowa	April 25, 2022	July 14, 2022	voice vote	July 18, 2022	Incumbent	–
54	Nina Y. Wang	D. Colo.	January 19, 2022	July 19, 2022	58–36	July 22, 2022	Incumbent	–
55	Nancy L. Maldonado	N.D. Ill.	April 25, 2022	July 19, 2022	53–45	August 10, 2022	July 11, 2024	Elevated
56	Gregory B. Williams	D. Del.	April 25, 2022	July 20, 2022	52–43	September 1, 2022	Incumbent	–
57	Elizabeth Hanes	E.D. Va.	May 19, 2022	August 2, 2022	59–37	August 5, 2022	Incumbent	–
58	Jennifer H. Rearden	S.D.N.Y.	January 19, 2022 (Note: Originally nominated on February 12, 2020, by President Trump. That nomination expired on January 3, 2021. Renominated by President Biden on January 19, 2022.)	September 8, 2022	voice vote	October 7, 2022	Incumbent	–
59	María Antongiorgi-Jordán	D.P.R.	June 15, 2022	November 15, 2022	55–43	December 1, 2022	Incumbent	–
60	Camille Vélez-Rivé	D.P.R.	June 15, 2022	November 30, 2022	55–42	December 9, 2022	Incumbent	–
61	Anne M. Nardacci	N.D.N.Y.	May 19, 2022	November 30, 2022	52–44	December 16, 2022	Incumbent	–
62	F. Kay Behm	E.D. Mich.	July 11, 2022	December 6, 2022	49–47	December 15, 2022	Incumbent	–
63	Kelley B. Hodge	E.D. Pa.	July 12, 2022	December 6, 2022	52–44	December 23, 2022	Incumbent	–
64	Mia Roberts Perez	E.D. Pa.	July 12, 2022	December 7, 2022	52–43	December 16, 2022	Incumbent	–
65	Kai Scott	E.D. Pa.	July 12, 2022	December 7, 2022	50–42	January 18, 2023	Incumbent	–
66	John Frank Murphy	E.D. Pa.	July 12, 2022	December 7, 2022	63–28	December 23, 2022	Incumbent	–
67	Jerry W. Blackwell	D. Minn.	June 15, 2022	December 7, 2022	51–43	December 20, 2022	Incumbent	–
68	Jeffery P. Hopkins	S.D. Ohio	August 1, 2022	December 8, 2022	64–32	December 16, 2022	Incumbent	–
69	Gina R. Méndez-Miró	D.P.R.	June 15, 2022	February 14, 2023	54–45	February 24, 2023	Incumbent	–
70	Lindsay C. Jenkins	N.D. Ill.	September 19, 2022	February 14, 2023	59–40	February 24, 2023	Incumbent	–
71	Matthew L. Garcia	D.N.M.	July 14, 2022	February 14, 2023	53–46	February 21, 2023	Incumbent	–
72	Adrienne Nelson	D. Ore.	July 14, 2022	February 15, 2023	52–46	February 23, 2023	Incumbent	–
73	Ana C. Reyes	D.D.C.	May 19, 2022	February 15, 2023	51–47	February 21, 2023	Incumbent	–
74	Daniel Calabretta	E.D. Cal.	August 1, 2022	February 16, 2023	51–45	February 21, 2023	Incumbent	–
75	Jamar K. Walker	E.D. Va.	July 13, 2022	February 28, 2023	52–41	March 3, 2023	Incumbent	–
76	Jamal Whitehead	W.D. Wash.	July 13, 2022	February 28, 2023	51–43	March 14, 2023	Incumbent	–
77	Araceli Martínez-Olguín	N.D. Cal.	August 1, 2022	February 28, 2023	49–48	March 3, 2023	Incumbent	–
78	Margaret R. Guzman	D. Mass.	July 13, 2022	March 1, 2023	49–48	March 3, 2023	Incumbent	–
79	Colleen Lawless	C.D. Ill.	September 6, 2022 (Note: Initial nomination was returned on January 3, 2023. Subsequently renominated on January 23, 2023.)	March 2, 2023	51–41	March 9, 2023	Incumbent	–
80	Jonathan J. C. Grey	E.D. Mich.	September 6, 2022	March 2, 2023	49–42	March 9, 2023	Incumbent	–
81	Robert S. Ballou	W.D. Va.	July 13, 2022	March 7, 2023	59–37	March 9, 2023	Incumbent	–
82	Andrew G. Schopler	S.D. Cal.	July 14, 2022	March 7, 2023	56–39	March 10, 2023	Incumbent	–
83	Arun Subramanian	S.D.N.Y.	September 6, 2022	March 7, 2023	59–37	April 13, 2023	Incumbent	–
84	James E. Simmons Jr.	S.D. Cal.	July 14, 2022	March 9, 2023	51–43	March 10, 2023	Incumbent	–
85	Jessica G. L. Clarke	S.D.N.Y.	December 15, 2021	March 16, 2023	48–43	April 20, 2023	Incumbent	–
86	Gordon Gallagher	D. Colo.	September 6, 2022	March 22, 2023	53–43	March 24, 2023	Incumbent	–
87	Matthew P. Brookman	S.D. Ind.	January 3, 2023	March 29, 2023	voice vote	March 31, 2023	Incumbent	–
88	Michael E. Farbiarz	D.N.J.	January 3, 2023	May 2, 2023	65–34	May 5, 2023	Incumbent	–
89	Robert Kirsch	D.N.J.	January 3, 2023	May 2, 2023	57–42	May 8, 2023	Incumbent	–
90	Orelia Merchant	E.D.N.Y.	September 6, 2022	May 3, 2023	51–48	May 12, 2023	Incumbent	–
91	Wesley Hsu	C.D. Cal.	January 23, 2023	May 3, 2023	53–43	May 12, 2023	Incumbent	–
92	LaShonda A. Hunt	N.D. Ill.	January 31, 2023	May 4, 2023	56–41	May 26, 2023	Incumbent	–
93	Amanda Brailsford	D. Idaho	January 31, 2023	May 4, 2023	voice vote	May 17, 2023	Incumbent	–
94	Jeremy C. Daniel	N.D. Ill.	March 21, 2023	May 17, 2023	56–40	June 6, 2023	Incumbent	–
95	Darrel J. Papillion	E.D. La.	March 21, 2023	May 30, 2023	59–31	June 1, 2023	Incumbent	–
96	Hernán D. Vera	C.D. Cal.	September 20, 2021 (Note: Initial nomination was returned on January 3, 2022. Subsequently renominated the same day. Nomination returned on January 3, 2023. Subsequently renominated the same day.)	June 13, 2023	51–48	June 15, 2023	Incumbent	–
97	P. Casey Pitts	N.D. Cal.	September 6, 2022	June 14, 2023	53–46	July 7, 2023	Incumbent	–
98	Dale Ho	S.D.N.Y.	September 30, 2021	June 14, 2023	50–49	August 18, 2023	Incumbent	–
99	Nusrat Jahan Choudhury	E.D.N.Y.	January 19, 2022	June 15, 2023	50–49	July 5, 2023	Incumbent	–
100	Natasha C. Merle	E.D.N.Y.	January 19, 2022	June 21, 2023	50–49	August 11, 2023	Incumbent	–
101	Kymberly Evanson	W.D. Wash.	July 13, 2022	July 11, 2023	50–42	July 18, 2023	Incumbent	–
102	Tiffany Cartwright	W.D. Wash.	January 19, 2022	July 12, 2023	50–47	July 18, 2023	Incumbent	–
103	Myong J. Joun	D. Mass.	August 1, 2022	July 12, 2023	52–46	July 14, 2023	Incumbent	–
104	Jeffrey Cummings	N.D. Ill.	January 31, 2023	September 12, 2023	50–45	October 10, 2023	Incumbent	–
105	Vernon D. Oliver	D. Conn.	May 4, 2023	September 19, 2023	53–44	October 18, 2023	Incumbent	–
106	Rita F. Lin	N.D. Cal.	August 1, 2022	September 19, 2023	52–45	October 4, 2023	Incumbent	–
107	Brendan Hurson	D. Md.	March 21, 2023	October 4, 2023	53–44	October 6, 2023	Incumbent	–
108	Susan K. DeClercq	E.D. Mich.	May 4, 2023	October 4, 2023	52–42	November 9, 2023	Incumbent	–
109	Jennifer L. Hall	D. Del.	July 11, 2023	October 17, 2023	67–29	January 4, 2024	Incumbent	–
110	Julia K. Munley	M.D. Pa.	May 4, 2023	October 17, 2023	52–45	November 7, 2023	Incumbent	–
111	Matthew J. Maddox	D. Md.	March 21, 2023	October 31, 2023	55–42	November 3, 2023	Incumbent	–
112	Kenly Kiya Kato	C.D. Cal.	December 15, 2021	November 7, 2023	51–46	November 17, 2023	Incumbent	–
113	Julia Kobick	D. Mass.	August 1, 2022	November 7, 2023	52–46	November 13, 2023	Incumbent	–
114	Ramon Reyes	E.D.N.Y.	September 6, 2022	November 8, 2023	51–48	November 13, 2023	Incumbent	–
115	Mónica Ramírez Almadani	C.D. Cal.	January 23, 2023	November 9, 2023	51–44	November 21, 2023	Incumbent	–
116	Brandy R. McMillion	E.D. Mich.	July 11, 2023	November 9, 2023	53–42	November 13, 2023	Incumbent	–
117	Jeffrey Bryan	D. Minn.	July 27, 2023	November 28, 2023	49–46	November 30, 2023	Incumbent	–
118	Margaret Garnett	S.D.N.Y.	July 11, 2023	November 28, 2023	49–46	January 9, 2024	Incumbent	–
119	Micah W. J. Smith	D. Haw.	September 11, 2023	November 29, 2023	57–41	January 31, 2024	Incumbent	–
120	Jamel K. Semper	D.N.J.	September 18, 2023	November 29, 2023	54–44	December 1, 2023	Incumbent	–
121	Shanlyn A. S. Park	D. Haw.	September 27, 2023	November 30, 2023	53–45	October 15, 2024	Incumbent	–
122	Loren AliKhan	D.D.C.	May 4, 2023	December 5, 2023	51–50	December 13, 2023	Incumbent	–
123	Jerry Edwards Jr.	W.D. La.	June 8, 2023	December 14, 2023	66–24	December 22, 2023	Incumbent	–
124	Brandon Scott Long	E.D. La.	June 8, 2023	December 14, 2023	64–22	December 19, 2023	Incumbent	–
125	Sara E. Hill	N.D. Okla.	October 24, 2023	December 19, 2023	52–14	January 2, 2024	Incumbent	–
126	John D. Russell	N.D. Okla.	October 24, 2023	December 19, 2023	voice vote	January 4, 2024	Incumbent	–
127	John A. Kazen	S.D. Tex.	September 11, 2023	January 9, 2024	83–14	January 12, 2024	Incumbent	–
128	Kato Crews	D. Colo.	February 27, 2023	January 10, 2024	51–48	January 12, 2024	Incumbent	–
129	Jacquelyn D. Austin	D.S.C.	November 6, 2023	January 24, 2024	80–17	January 29, 2024	Incumbent	–
130	Cristal C. Brisco	N.D. Ind.	November 27, 2023	January 24, 2024	67–32	January 26, 2024	Incumbent	–
131	Gretchen S. Lund	N.D. Ind.	November 27, 2023	January 25, 2024	87–6	January 29, 2024	Incumbent	–
132	Kirk E. Sherriff	E.D. Cal.	November 15, 2023	January 31, 2024	54–45	February 7, 2024	Incumbent	–
133	Karoline Mehalchick	M.D. Pa.	July 11, 2023	January 31, 2024	50–49	February 5, 2024	Incumbent	–
134	Amy M. Baggio	D. Ore.	November 27, 2023	February 6, 2024	54–44	August 22, 2024	Incumbent	–
135	Jacqueline Becerra	S.D. Fla.	November 6, 2023	February 27, 2024	56–40	February 29, 2024	Incumbent	–
136	David S. Leibowitz	S.D. Fla.	November 6, 2023	February 27, 2024	64–33	March 1, 2024	Incumbent	–
137	Julie S. Sneed	M.D. Fla.	November 6, 2023	February 28, 2024	54–44	March 4, 2024	Incumbent	–
138	Melissa Damian	S.D. Fla.	November 6, 2023	February 28, 2024	77–20	March 4, 2024	Incumbent	–
139	Kelly H. Rankin	D. Wyo.	January 10, 2024	March 7, 2024	voice vote	March 12, 2024	Incumbent	–
140	Jasmine H. Yoon	W.D. Va.	February 1, 2024	March 12, 2024	55–41	July 8, 2024	Incumbent	–
141	Sunil Harjani	N.D. Ill.	February 1, 2024	March 12, 2024	53–46	March 20, 2024	Incumbent	–
142	Melissa R. DuBose	D.R.I.	February 1, 2024	March 12, 2024	51–47	January 2, 2025	Incumbent	–
143	Edward S. Kiel	D.N.J.	October 4, 2023	March 20, 2024	50–49	March 25, 2024	Incumbent	–
144	Eumi K. Lee	N.D. Cal.	July 27, 2023	March 20, 2024	50–49	May 7, 2024	Incumbent	–
145	Ernesto Gonzalez	W.D. Tex.	January 10, 2024 (Note: Originally nominated on January 10, 2024, to a seat on the Western District of Texas. Nomination withdrawn and renominated to a different seat on February 7, 2024.)	March 22, 2024	88–7	April 9, 2024	Incumbent	–
146	Leon Schydlower	W.D. Tex.	January 10, 2024	March 22, 2024	90–8	March 26, 2024	Incumbent	–
147	Susan M. Bazis	D. Neb.	January 10, 2024	April 9, 2024	78–21	April 10, 2024	Incumbent	–
148	Robert J. White	E.D. Mich.	February 1, 2024	April 9, 2024	58–42	April 15, 2024	Incumbent	–
149	Ann Marie McIff Allen	D. Utah	January 10, 2024	April 10, 2024	100–0	April 12, 2024	Incumbent	–
150	Georgia N. Alexakis	N.D. Ill.	February 27, 2024	May 1, 2024	54–44	August 2, 2024	Incumbent	–
151	Sanket J. Bulsara	E.D.N.Y.	February 8, 2024	May 15, 2024	51–42	December 20, 2024	Incumbent	–
152	Eric Schulte	D.S.D.	February 8, 2024	May 15, 2024	61–33	June 3, 2024	Incumbent	–
153	Camela C. Theeler	D.S.D.	February 8, 2024	May 16, 2024	90–4	June 4, 2024	Incumbent	–
154	Krissa M. Lanham	D. Ariz.	February 27, 2024	May 21, 2024	66–26	June 3, 2024	Incumbent	–
155	Angela M. Martinez	D. Ariz.	February 27, 2024	May 22, 2024	66–28	July 2, 2024	Incumbent	–
156	Dena M. Coggins	E.D. Cal.	February 8, 2024	May 22, 2024	50–44	September 18, 2024	Incumbent	–
157	Stacey D. Neumann	D. Me.	April 30, 2024	July 30, 2024	50–43	August 22, 2024	Incumbent	–
158	Meredith Vacca	W.D.N.Y.	May 14, 2024	July 31, 2024	50–41	August 1, 2024	Incumbent	–
159	Joseph F. Saporito Jr.	M.D. Pa.	May 14, 2024	July 31, 2024	53–39	August 13, 2024	Incumbent	–
160	Adam B. Abelson	D. Md.	May 14, 2024	September 10, 2024	53–43	September 12, 2024	Incumbent	–
161	Jeannette Vargas	S.D.N.Y.	March 21, 2024	September 10, 2024	51–43	November 6, 2024	Incumbent	–
162	Mary Kay Lanthier	D. Vt.	June 4, 2024	September 11, 2024	55–42	September 12, 2024	Incumbent	–
163	Laura Provinzino	D. Minn.	June 13, 2024	September 12, 2024	54–41	September 16, 2024	Incumbent	–
164	Mary Kay Costello	E.D. Pa.	June 13, 2024	September 17, 2024	52–41	September 19, 2024	Incumbent	–
165	Michelle Williams Court	C.D. Cal.	April 30, 2024	September 18, 2024	49–44	November 7, 2024	Incumbent	–
166	Byron B. Conway	E.D. Wis.	July 8, 2024	September 25, 2024	58–37	November 4, 2024	Incumbent	–
167	April Perry	N.D. Ill.	July 11, 2024	November 12, 2024	51–44	November 20, 2024	Incumbent	–
168	Jonathan E. Hawley	C.D. Ill.	July 8, 2024	November 13, 2024	50–46	November 15, 2024	Incumbent	–
169	Mustafa T. Kasubhai	D. Ore.	September 18, 2023	November 19, 2024	51–44	November 22, 2024	Incumbent	–
170	Sarah F. Russell	D. Conn.	October 4, 2023	November 19, 2024	50–44	November 26, 2024	Incumbent	–
171	Rebecca L. Pennell	E.D. Wash.	March 21, 2024	November 20, 2024	50–48	December 9, 2024	Incumbent	–
172	Amir Ali	D.D.C.	February 1, 2024	November 20, 2024	50–49	November 22, 2024	Incumbent	–
173	Sharad H. Desai	D. Ariz.	September 9, 2024	November 21, 2024	82–12	January 7, 2025	Incumbent	–
174	Anne Hwang	C.D. Cal.	April 30, 2024	December 2, 2024	48–43	December 6, 2024	Incumbent	–
175	Brian E. Murphy	D. Mass.	March 21, 2024	December 2, 2024	47–45	December 6, 2024	Incumbent	–
176	Sparkle L. Sooknanan	D.D.C.	February 27, 2024	December 3, 2024	50–48	January 2, 2025	Incumbent	–
177	Catherine Henry	E.D. Pa.	June 4, 2024	December 3, 2024	50–48	December 6, 2024	Incumbent	–
178	Gail A. Weilheimer	E.D. Pa.	July 8, 2024	December 3, 2024	50–48	January 2, 2025	Incumbent	–
179	Anthony Brindisi	N.D.N.Y.	July 31, 2024	December 4, 2024	50–49	December 9, 2024	Incumbent	–
180	Elizabeth C. Coombe	N.D.N.Y.	September 9, 2024	December 4, 2024	52–45	December 9, 2024	Incumbent	–
181	Sarah M. Davenport	D.N.M.	September 9, 2024	December 5, 2024	52–45	January 13, 2025	Incumbent	–
182	Tiffany R. Johnson	N.D. Ga.	July 31, 2024	December 9, 2024	48–44	January 2, 2025	Incumbent	–
183	Keli M. Neary	M.D. Pa.	July 31, 2024	December 10, 2024	49–48	January 17, 2025	Incumbent	–
184	Cynthia Valenzuela Dixon	C.D. Cal.	April 30, 2024	December 10, 2024	49–47	December 16, 2024	Incumbent	–
185	Noël Wise	N.D. Cal.	June 13, 2024	December 11, 2024	50–47	December 19, 2024	Incumbent	–
186	Benjamin J. Cheeks	S.D. Cal.	November 18, 2024	December 20, 2024	49–47	January 9, 2025	Incumbent	–
187	Serena Murillo	C.D. Cal.	November 18, 2024	December 20, 2024	49–47	January 9, 2025	Incumbent	–

== United States Court of International Trade ==
#	Judge	Nomination date	Confirmation date	Confirmation vote	Began active service	Ended active service	Ended senior status
1	Lisa Wang	July 11, 2023	February 1, 2024	53–42	February 7, 2024	Incumbent	–
2	Joseph A. Laroski	July 11, 2023	February 5, 2024	76–0	February 14, 2024	Incumbent	–

== Specialty courts (Article I) ==
=== United States Court of Federal Claims ===
#	Judge	Nomination date	Confirmation date	Confirmation vote	Began active service	Ended active service	Ended senior status
1	Armando O. Bonilla	July 13, 2021 (Note: Originally nominated on May 21, 2014, by President Obama. That nomination was returned on December 16, 2014. Renominated on January 7, 2015, but was expired on January 3, 2017. Renominated by President Biden on July 13, 2021, but was withdrawn on October 5, 2021 to include corrected information. It was resubmitted on the same day.)	December 18, 2021	voice vote	February 17, 2022	Incumbent	–
2	Carolyn N. Lerner	July 13, 2021	December 18, 2021	voice vote	February 17, 2022	Incumbent	–
3	Molly Silfen	February 27, 2023	June 8, 2023	55–39	June 13, 2023	Incumbent	–
4	Philip Hadji	June 8, 2023	September 21, 2023	voice vote	September 28, 2023	Incumbent	–
5	Robin M. Meriweather	January 10, 2024	July 11, 2024	52–39	August 8, 2024	Incumbent	–

=== United States Tax Court ===
#	Judge	Nomination date	Confirmation date	Confirmation vote	Began active service	Ended active service	Ended senior status
1	Kashi Way	February 1, 2024	July 25, 2024	79–16	August 7, 2024	Incumbent	–
2	Adam B. Landy	February 1, 2024	July 29, 2024	73–13	August 8, 2024	Incumbent	–
3	Rose E. Jenkins	February 1, 2024	September 23, 2024	69–17	October 15, 2024	Incumbent	–
4	Jeffrey Arbeit	May 9, 2024	September 25, 2024	voice vote	October 3, 2024	Incumbent	–
5	Benjamin A. Guider III	May 9, 2024	September 25, 2024	voice vote	October 3, 2024	Incumbent	–
6	Cathy Fung	May 9, 2024	November 14, 2024	59–37	December 13, 2024	Incumbent	–

=== United States Court of Appeals for the Armed Forces ===
#	Judge	Nomination date	Confirmation date	Confirmation vote	Began active service	Ended active service	Ended senior status
1	M. Tia Johnson	January 7, 2022	December 15, 2022	76–20	January 3, 2023	Incumbent	–

=== United States Court of Military Commission Review ===
#	Judge	Nomination date	Confirmation date	Confirmation vote	Began active service	Ended active service
1	Natalie D. Richardson	January 26, 2023	February 16, 2023	voice vote	March 22, 2023	2025
2	LaJohnne A. Morris	January 26, 2023	February 16, 2023	voice vote	March 22, 2023	Incumbent
3	Jennifer A. Parker	January 26, 2023	February 16, 2023	voice vote	March 29, 2023	2025
4	Michael C. Holifield	January 26, 2023	February 16, 2023	voice vote	March 22, 2023	2025
5	Stuart T. Kirkby	January 26, 2023	February 16, 2023	voice vote	March 28, 2023	2025

== Territorial courts (Article IV) ==
#	Judge	Court	Nomination date	Confirmation date	Confirmation vote	Began active service	Ended active service	Ended senior status
1	Ramona Villagomez Manglona	D. N. Mar. I.	September 11, 2023	April 16, 2024	96–2	July 29, 2011 (Note: Manglona was first appointed as judge by President Obama on July 29, 2011. Her commission expired on July 28, 2021, but she continued to serve until a successor was appointed. She was renominated to the position by President Biden and confirmed.)	Incumbent	–

== See also ==
- Judicial appointment history for United States federal courts
- List of presidents of the United States by judicial appointments
- List of United States attorneys appointed by Joe Biden
- Joe Biden judicial appointment controversies
