= Circuit court =

Type of court in many countries

Circuit courts are court systems in several common law jurisdictions. It may refer to:

- Courts that literally sit 'on circuit', i.e., judges move around a region or country to different towns or cities where they will hear cases;
- Courts that sit within a judicial circuit, i.e., an administrative division of a country's judiciary; or
- A higher-level trial court, e.g., for felony or indictment offences.

== History ==
=== Origin in England ===
The term "circuit court" is derived from the English custom of itinerant courts whose judges periodically travelled on pre-set paths – or circuits – to hear cases from different areas.

==== Establishment ====
The first formal circuits were defined in 1293, when a statute was enacted which established four assize circuits.

It was long assumed that these circuits originated with the eyre in common pleas during the reign of Henry II, but during the late 1950s, legal historians such as Ralph Pugh recognized that the eyre's "connection with later circuit justices is rather collateral than lineal", and the eyre was merely one of a number of experiments in "systematized itinerant justice" undertaken by the English crown during the late 12th century and the 13th century.

==== Development ====
The development of the assize circuits was interrupted in 1305 by the appointment of justices of trailbaston by King Edward I. Under King Edward III, two statutes were enacted in 1328 and 1330 which restored the assize circuits and reorganized the counties of England into six circuits where assizes were supposed to be held thrice yearly (but were more often held twice each year).

By 1337, the six assize circuits had stabilized:

Circuit	Counties
Home	Essex, Hertfordshire, Kent, Middlesex, Surrey, Sussex
Midland	Derbyshire, Leicestershire, Lincolnshire, Nottinghamshire, Northamptonshire, Rutland, Warwickshire
Norfolk	Bedfordshire, Buckinghamshire, Cambridgeshire, Huntingdonshire, Norfolk, Suffolk
Oxford	Gloucestershire, Herefordshire, Shropshire, Staffordshire, Worcestershire
Northern	Cumberland, Lancashire, Northumberland, Westmorland, Yorkshire
Western	Berkshire, Cornwall, Devon, Dorset, Hampshire, Oxfordshire, Somerset, Wiltshire

During the 1500s, two major changes occurred. Middlesex was removed from the Home Circuit and grouped with the adjacent City of London (which was never part of the circuits), and Oxfordshire and Berkshire were transferred from the Western Circuit to the Oxford Circuit. The Welsh county of Monmouthshire was also transferred into the Oxford Circuit.

After that, the circuits of England remained largely static for almost four centuries, until they were again reorganized during the 19th century. Twice each year, judges "literally rode each circuit," meaning that a pair of common law judges assigned to a circuit rode on horseback through all the county towns and several other important towns in each circuit and heard cases.

=== Origin in North America ===
On the American frontier, a judge often travelled on horseback along with a group of lawyers. Abraham Lincoln was one such attorney who regularly rode the circuit in Illinois, along with Circuit Judge David Davis. In more settled areas, a stagecoach would be used. Eventually, the legal caseload in a county would become great enough to warrant the establishment of a local judiciary.

Most of these local judicial circuits (that is, in terms of the actual routes travelled by judges) have been thus replaced by judges regularly stationed at local courthouses, but in many areas, the legacy term remains in use.

== England and Wales ==
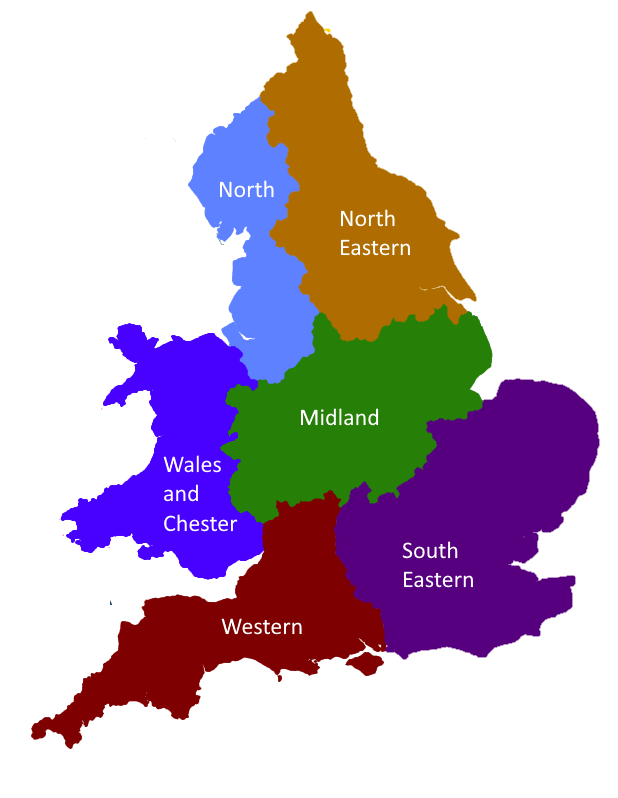
Map of the geographic boundaries of the circuits of England and Wales.

England and Wales is divided into six circuits for the purposes of the administration of justice: the Midland Circuit, North Eastern Circuit, Northern Circuit, South Eastern Circuit, Western Circuit, and the Wales and Chester Circuit.

The system is overseen by the Lord Chancellor. The membership consists of High Court Judges, Circuit Judges, District Judges, law practitioners and academic lawyers. The Circuits also form the basis for administration of the Bar in England and Wales except for Cheshire.

Until 2007 for court administration purposes it formed part of the Wales and Chester Circuit. When in 2007 it became part of the Northern Circuit for court administrative purposes post devolution, the "Wales and Chester Circuit" continued to be the Circuit Bar.

The Circuit Bars are represented on the Bar Council through the Circuit Leaders.

== Ireland ==
In Ireland the Circuit Court is part of the Courts of First Instance, senior to the District Court but junior to the High Court (Ireland). It was first established as the Circuit Court of Justice under the Courts of Justice Act 1924 and replaced the County Court on the civil side, and quarter sessions and recorder's courts on the criminal side, as well as some of the jurisdiction of the assizes. These are heard by a judge sitting alone. It also has jurisdiction to hear appeals from the District Court. Appeals from the court lie to the High Court on the civil side and the Court of Criminal Appeal on the criminal side.

The Circuit Court is so-called because of the circuits on which its judges travel, namely Dublin, Cork, Northern, Western, Eastern, South Western, South Eastern, and Midland, each of which are composed of a number of counties. The court consist of a President and thirty-seven judges. Although there is strictly speaking just one Circuit Court, a sitting of the Circuit Court in any particular location is referred to as name of town Circuit Court, e.g. Trim Circuit Court.

The High Court also sits "on circuit" twice yearly, though this is called the High Court on Circuit rather than a circuit court. In this case, "on circuit" means sitting in a location other than Dublin.

== United States ==
=== Federal courts of appeals ===
Map of the geographic boundaries of the circuit courts, the appeal courts directly under the Supreme Court. Cases appeal from a District Court to an Appeals Court located within a specific circuit. From there, cases may appeal to the Supreme Court.

In the United States, circuit courts were first established in the Thirteen British Colonies. In 1789, the United States circuit courts were United States federal courts established in each federal judicial district. These circuit courts exercised both original (first instance) and appellate jurisdiction. They existed until 1912. The original jurisdiction formerly exercised by the United States circuit courts is now exercised by the United States district courts. Their appellate jurisdiction is now exercised by the United States courts of appeals, which were known as the United States circuit courts of appeals from their establishment in 1894 until 1947.

The federal courts of appeals sit permanently in 13 appellate circuits (11 regional circuits as well as a DC Circuit and the Federal Circuit). There are several other federal courts that bear the phrase "Court of Appeals" in their names, but they are not Article Three courts and are not considered to sit in appellate circuits.

The federal courts of appeals are intermediate courts, between the district courts (the federal trial courts) and the Supreme Court. Smaller circuits, such as the Second Circuit and Third Circuit, are based at a single federal courthouse, while others, such as the large Ninth Circuit, are spread across many courthouses. Since three-judge federal appellate panels are randomly selected from all sitting circuit judges, Ninth Circuit judges must often "ride the circuit," though this duty has become much easier to carry out since the development of modern air travel.

=== Supreme Court of the United States ===
Under the original Judiciary Act of 1789 and subsequent acts, the justices of the Supreme Court of the United States in Washington, D.C. had the responsibility of "riding circuit" and personally hearing both appeals and trials in the circuit courts, in addition to their caseload back in the capital. This duty was reasonable when the United States consisted of the original Thirteen Colonies along the East Coast of the United States, but became increasingly onerous and impractical with the country's rapid westward expansion during the 19th century, and was repealed by Congress with the enacting of the Judiciary Act of 1891. The U.S. Supreme Court justices still retain vestiges of the days of riding circuit; each justice is designated to hear certain interlocutory appeals from specific circuits and can unilaterally decide them or refer them to the entire court. The court's customary summer recess originated as the time during which the justices would leave Washington and ride circuit (since dirt roads were more passable in the summer).

=== State courts ===
Many U.S. states have state courts called "circuit courts." Most are trial courts of general, original jurisdiction.

- Alabama – Alabama Circuit Courts
- Arkansas – Arkansas Circuit Courts
- Connecticut – Connecticut Circuit Courts
- Florida – Florida circuit courts
- Hawaii – Hawaii State Circuit Courts
- Illinois – Illinois circuit courts
- Indiana – Indiana Circuit Courts
- Kentucky – Kentucky Circuit Courts
- Maryland – Maryland Circuit Courts
- Michigan – Michigan Circuit Courts
- Mississippi – Mississippi Circuit Courts
- Missouri – Missouri Circuit Courts
- New Hampshire – New Hampshire Circuit Courts
- Oregon – Oregon circuit courts
- South Carolina – South Carolina Circuit Court
- South Dakota – South Dakota Circuit Courts
- Tennessee – Tennessee Circuit Courts
- Virginia – Virginia Circuit Court – court of record that has appellate jurisdiction over a county's general district court and juvenile and domestic relations court and original jurisdiction over major civil cases and all the county's felony cases. A circuit court has the power to issue death sentences and impanel grand juries. The court's decisions become legal precedents.
- West Virginia – West Virginia Circuit Courts
- Wisconsin – Wisconsin circuit courts

In Louisiana, the intermediate appellate courts are called the Louisiana Circuit Courts of Appeal. There are five separate judicial circuits.

In many states, such as Missouri, a judicial circuit can encompass one or more counties (see Missouri Circuit Courts). Each circuit court can have several divisions, including circuit, associate, small claims, probate, family, or drug court. Each division hears cases within its particular area of subject-matter jurisdiction, and jurisdiction is based on the size or type of a civil claim or the severity or type of a criminal charge. Drug court, for example, hears only drug-related criminal cases.

Several U.S. states have state supreme courts that traditionally "ride the circuit" in the sense of hearing oral arguments at multiple locations throughout their jurisdictions each year. Among the states with circuit-riding supreme courts are Alaska, California, Idaho, Oregon, Pennsylvania, Tennessee, and Washington.

== Canada ==
Courts serving certain areas particularly in Northern Canada, such as the Nunavut Court of Justice and courts serving northern Quebec, travel as circuit courts to hear cases in remote communities. Additionally, Canada's Federal Courts, such as the Federal Court of Appeal and the Federal Court, are also circuit courts, sitting in regional courthouses across Canada (while being based primarily in Ottawa).

== Australia ==
Courts serving remote areas in the Northern Territory are known as circuit courts, sometimes referred to as "bush courts".

== See also ==
- Assizes
- Circuit riding
