= Senator Wyman =

Senator Wyman may refer to:

- Alfred Lee Wyman (1874–1953), South Dakota State Senate
- Louis C. Wyman (1917–2002), U.S. Senator from New Hampshire for three days in 1974 and 1975
- Phil Wyman (1945–2019), California State Senate
