= United States District Court for the District of South Dakota =

United States federal district court of South Dakota

Coordinates: 45.460896°N 98.485908°W

- (D.S.D.)
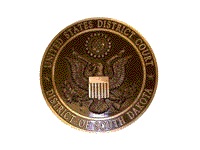

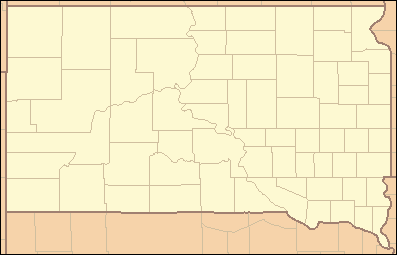
- Location: Federal Building and United States Courthouse (Sioux Falls) More locations: Rapid City; Pierre; United States Post Office and Courthouse (Aberdeen)
- Appeals to: Eighth Circuit
- Established: November 2, 1889
- Judges: 3
- Chief Judge: Roberto Lange

Officers of the court
- U.S. Attorney: Ron A. Parsons Jr.
- U.S. Marshal: Daniel C. Mosteller
- www.sdd.uscourts.gov

The United States District Court for the District of South Dakota (in case citations, D.S.D.) is the United States District Court or the Federal district court, whose jurisdiction for issues pertaining to federal law or diversity for the state of South Dakota. The court is based in Sioux Falls with other courthouses in Rapid City, Pierre, and Aberdeen. The district was created in 1889, when the Dakota Territory was divided into North and South Dakota.

Appeals from the District of South Dakota are taken to the United States Court of Appeals for the Eighth Circuit (except for patent claims and claims against the U.S. government under the Tucker Act, which are appealed to the Federal Circuit).

The United States Attorney's Office for the District of South Dakota represents the United States in civil and criminal litigation in the court. As of October 14, 2025 the United States Attorney for the District of South Dakota is Ron A. Parsons Jr..

== Current judges ==
As of June 4, 2024:

| # | Title | Judge | Duty station | Born | Term of service | | | Appointed by |
| # | Title | Judge | Duty station | Born | Active | Chief | Senior | Appointed by |
|---|---|---|---|---|---|---|---|---|
| 16 | Chief Judge | Roberto Lange | Sioux Falls | 1963 | 2009–present | 2020–present | — | Obama |
| 17 | District Judge | Eric Schulte | Pierre | 1972 | 2024–present | — | — | Biden |
| 18 | District Judge | Camela C. Theeler | Rapid City | 1975 | 2024–present | — | — | Biden |
| 12 | Senior Judge | Lawrence L. Piersol | Sioux Falls | 1940 | 1993–2009 | 1999–2005 | 2009–present | Clinton |
| 13 | Senior Judge | Charles B. Kornmann | Aberdeen | 1937 | 1995–2008 | — | 2008–present | Clinton |
| 14 | Senior Judge | Karen Schreier | Sioux Falls | 1956 | 1999–2024 | 2006–2013 | 2024–present | Clinton |

== Former judges ==
| # | Judge | Born–died | Active service | Chief Judge | Senior status | Appointed by | Reason for termination |
|---|---|---|---|---|---|---|---|
| 1 | Alonzo J. Edgerton | 1827–1896 | 1889–1896 (Note: Recess appointment; formally nominated on December 16, 1889, confirmed by the United States Senate on January 16, 1890, and received commission the same day) | — | — | B. Harrison | death |
| 2 | John Emmett Carland | 1853–1922 | 1896–1911 (Note: Recess appointment; formally nominated on December 8, 1896, confirmed by the Senate on December 15, 1896, and received commission the same day) | — | — | Cleveland | elevation |
| 3 | James Douglas Elliott | 1859–1933 | 1911–1933 | — | — | Taft | death |
| 4 | Alfred Lee Wyman | 1874–1953 | 1929–1953 | — | — | Hoover | death |
| 5 | George T. Mickelson | 1903–1965 | 1953–1965 (Note: Recess appointment; formally nominated on January 11, 1954, confirmed by the Senate on February 9, 1954, and received commission on February 10, 1954) | 1954–1965 | — | Eisenhower | death |
| 6 | Axel J. Beck | 1894–1981 | 1958–1969 | 1965–1966 | 1969–1981 | Eisenhower | death |
| 7 | Fred Joseph Nichol | 1912–1996 | 1965–1980 | 1966–1980 | 1980–1996 | L. Johnson | death |
| 8 | Andrew Wendell Bogue | 1919–2009 | 1970–1985 | 1980–1985 | 1985–2009 | Nixon | death |
| 9 | Donald J. Porter | 1921–2003 | 1979–1992 | 1985–1991 | 1992–2003 | Carter | death |
| 10 | John Bailey Jones | 1927–2023 | 1981–1995 | 1991–1994 | 1995–2023 | Reagan | death |
| 11 | Richard Battey | 1929–2017 | 1985–1999 | 1994–1998 | 1999–2017 | Reagan | death |
| 15 | Jeffrey L. Viken | 1952–present | 2009–2021 | 2013–2019 | 2021–2023 | Obama | retirement |

== Chief judges ==
Chief judges have administrative responsibilities with respect to their district court. Unlike the Supreme Court, where one justice is specifically nominated to be chief, the office of chief judge rotates among the district court judges. To be chief, a judge must have been in active service on the court for at least one year, be under the age of 65, and have not previously served as chief judge.

A vacancy is filled by the judge highest in seniority among the group of qualified judges. The chief judge serves for a term of seven years, or until age 70, whichever occurs first. The age restrictions are waived if no members of the court would otherwise be qualified for the position.

When the office was created in 1948, the chief judge was the longest-serving judge who had not elected to retire, on what has since 1958 been known as senior status, or declined to serve as chief judge. After August 6, 1959, judges could not become or remain chief after turning 70 years old. The current rules have been in operation since October 1, 1982.

== Succession of seats ==
Seat 1
Seat established on November 2, 1889 by 25 Stat. 676
| Edgerton | 1890–1896 |
| Carland | 1896–1911 |
| Elliott | 1911–1933 |
Seat abolished on January 30, 1933 (temporary judgeship expired)

Seat 2
Seat established on February 26, 1929 by 45 Stat. 1317 (temporary)
Seat became permanent upon the abolition of Seat 1 on January 30, 1933
| Wyman | 1929–1953 |
Seat abolished on December 15, 1953 (temporary judgeship expired)

Seat 3
Seat established on December 9, 1953 pursuant to 65 Stat. 710 (temporary)
Seat became permanent upon the abolition of Seat 2 on December 15, 1953
| Mickelson | 1954–1965 |
| Nichol | 1965–1980 |
| Jones | 1981–1995 |
| Kornmann | 1995–2008 |
| Lange | 2009–present |

Seat 4
Seat established on February 10, 1954 by 68 Stat. 8 (temporary)
Seat expired never having been filled
Seat reestablished and made permanent on September 7, 1957 by 71 Stat. 631
| Beck | 1958–1969 |
| Bogue | 1970–1985 |
| Battey | 1985–1999 |
| Schreier | 1999–2024 |
| Schulte | 2024–present |

Seat 5
Seat established on October 20, 1978 by 92 Stat. 1629
| Porter | 1979–1992 |
| Piersol | 1993–2009 |
| Viken | 2009–2021 |
| Theeler | 2024–present |

== See also ==
- Courts of South Dakota
- List of current United States district judges
- List of United States federal courthouses in South Dakota
- United States Attorney for the District of South Dakota
