= Camela C. Theeler =

American judge (born 1975)

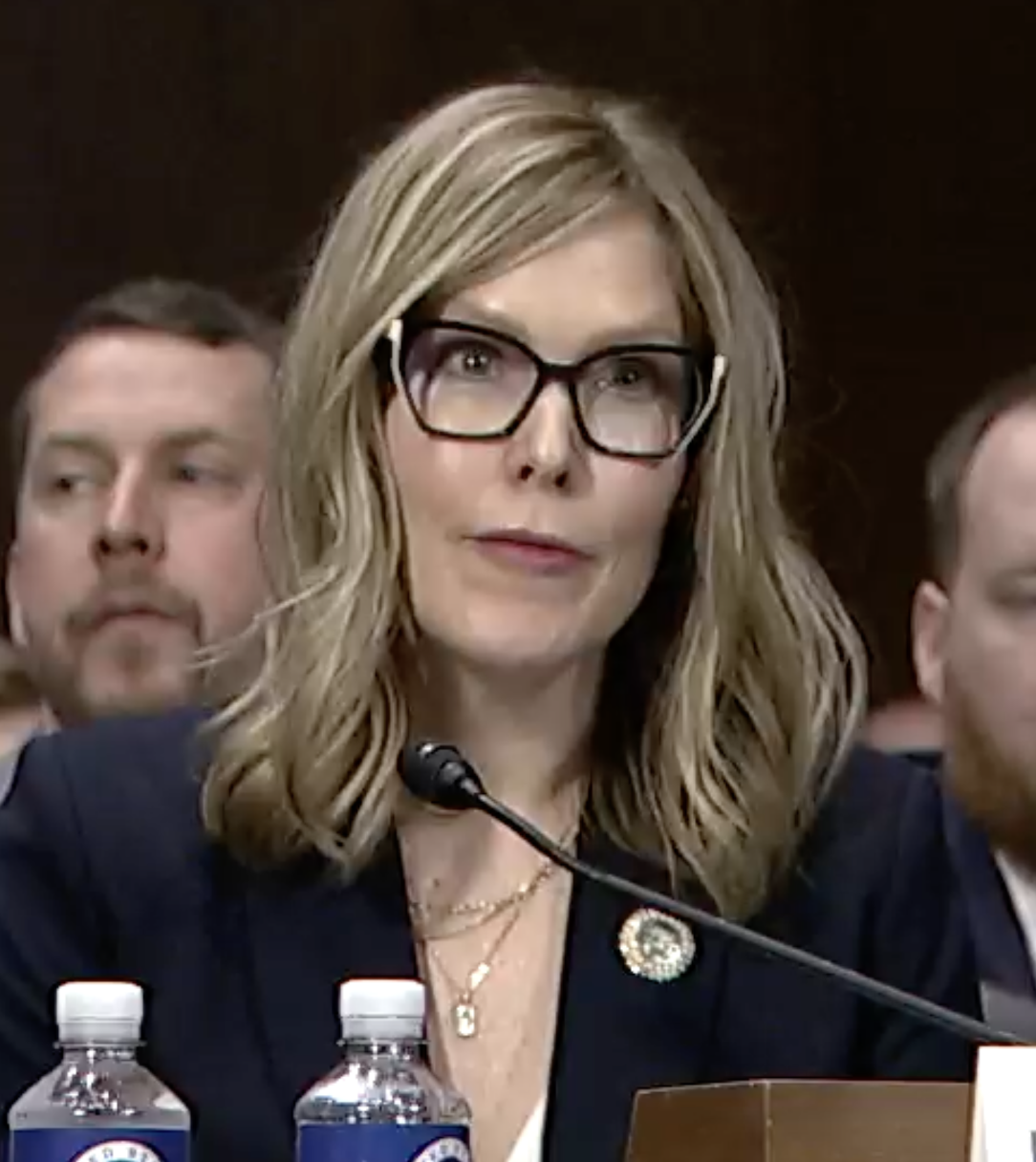

Judge of the United States District Court for the District of South Dakota
- Incumbent
- Assumed office June 4, 2024
- Appointed by: Joe Biden
- Preceded by: Jeffrey L. Viken

Judge of the Second Judicial Circuit Court of the South Dakota
- In office 2018 – June 4, 2024
- Appointed by: Dennis Daugaard
- Preceded by: Joseph Neiles

Personal details
- Born: Camela Catherine Clark; 1975 (age 50–51) Sioux Falls, South Dakota, U.S.
- Party: Republican
- Education: University of South Dakota (BA, JD)

Camela Catherine Theeler (née Clark; born 1975) is an American lawyer who has served as a United States district judge of the United States District Court for the District of South Dakota since 2024. She previously served as a judge of the Second Judicial Circuit Court of the South Dakota from 2018 to 2024.

== Education ==
Theeler earned a Bachelor of Arts from the University of South Dakota in 1998 and a Juris Doctor from the University of South Dakota School of Law in 2000.

== Career ==
From 2001 to 2002, she served as a law clerk for the First Judicial Circuit of the South Dakota Unified Judicial System. From 2002 to 2003, she worked as an associate at the Morgan Theeler Law Firm, L.L.P. From 2003 to 2008, she was an associate with Lynn, Jackson, Shultz & Lebrun, P.C. and was a partner with the same firm from 2008 to 2012. From 2012 to 2018, she served as an assistant United States attorney in the U.S. Attorney's Office for the District of South Dakota. On January 12, 2018, South Dakota Governor Dennis Daugaard appointed her to serve as a judge of the Second Judicial Circuit Court of the South Dakota, to fill the vacancy left by the retirement of Judge Joseph Neiles.

=== Federal judicial service ===
On February 7, 2024, President Joe Biden announced his intent to nominate Theeler to serve as a United States district judge of the United States District Court for the District of South Dakota as part of a bipartisan package of nominees including Eric Schulte. She was recommended to the White House by Senators John Thune and Mike Rounds. On February 8, 2024, her nomination was sent to the Senate. President Biden nominated Theeler to the seat vacated by Judge Jeffrey L. Viken, who assumed senior status on October 1, 2021. On March 6, 2024, a hearing on her nomination was held before the Senate Judiciary Committee. On April 11, 2024, her nomination was reported out of committee by a 20–1 vote. On May 16, 2024, the United States Senate confirmed her nomination by a 90–4 vote. She received her judicial commission on June 4, 2024.

=== Notable cases ===
In July 2026, Theeler blocked South Dakota's abortion pill advertising ban, which opponents have criticized as a violation of the First Amendment.

Legal offices
Preceded by Jeffrey L. Viken	Judge of the United States District Court for the District of South Dakota; 2024–present	Incumbent
