= Richard Battey =

American judge

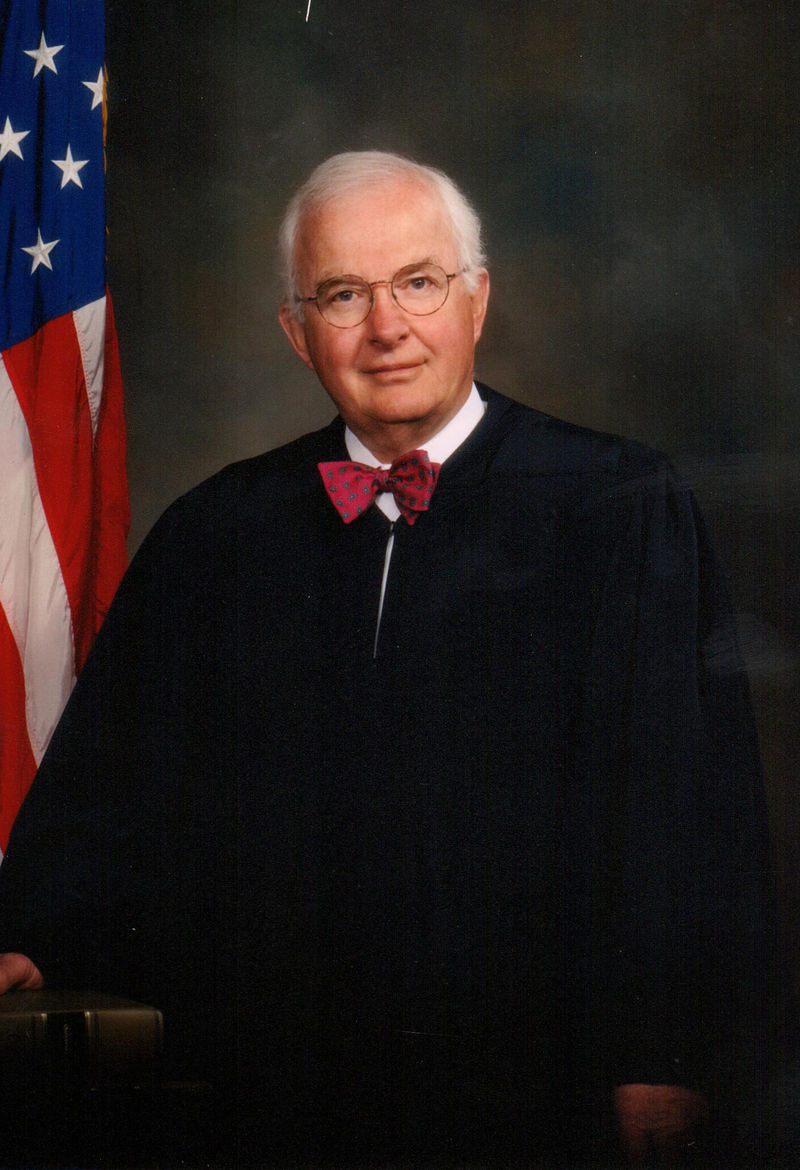

Senior Judge of the United States District Court for the District of South Dakota
- In office January 1, 1999 – May 6, 2017

Chief Judge of the United States District Court for the District of South Dakota
- In office 1994–1998
- Preceded by: John Bailey Jones
- Succeeded by: Lawrence L. Piersol

Judge of the United States District Court for the District of South Dakota
- In office October 28, 1985 – January 1, 1999
- Appointed by: Ronald Reagan
- Preceded by: Andrew Wendell Bogue
- Succeeded by: Karen Schreier

Personal details
- Born: Richard Howard Battey; October 16, 1929 Aberdeen, South Dakota
- Died: May 6, 2017 (aged 87) Alexandria, Minnesota
- Education: University of South Dakota; University of South Dakota School of Law (J.D.)

Richard Howard Battey (October 16, 1929 – May 6, 2017) was a United States district judge of the United States District Court for the District of South Dakota.

== Education and career ==
Battey was born in Aberdeen, South Dakota. After attending the University of South Dakota in 1950, he received a Juris Doctor from the University of South Dakota School of Law in 1953. After serving as a United States Army lieutenant from 1953 to 1955, he went into private practice in Redfield, South Dakota, from 1955 to 1985.

== Federal judicial service ==
Battey was nominated to be a United States district judge of the United States District Court for the District of South Dakota by Ronald Reagan on September 27, 1985. He was confirmed by the United States Senate on October 25, 1985, and received his commission on October 28, 1985. He served as chief judge from 1994 to 1998. He assumed senior status on January 1, 1999, serving in that status until his death.

=== 'Sue' dinosaur fossil dispute ===
Battey is known for being the presiding judge in the dispute over the recovery fossil remains on federal lands including by the Sue discoverer Peter Larson and Black Hills Institute of Geological Research paleontologists. Following a trial on charges unrelated to the "Sue" T. rex find, Larson was convicted of two felonies and two misdemeanors, charges which some considered politically motivated. Battey sentenced Larson to two years in federal prison. In 2015, South Dakota lawmakers petitioned Barack Obama for a formal full pardon of Larson. Battey is portrayed in a negative light for his handling of Sue Dinosaur Case in the Sundance Film Festival Documentary Dinosaur 13.

=== Notable law clerks ===
Among Battey's notable judicial law clerks were David Lust, Marty Jackley, and Veronica Duffy.

== Death ==
Richard Battey died in Alexandria, Minnesota, on May 6, 2017.

== Sources ==
Legal offices
Preceded by Andrew Wendell Bogue	Judge of the United States District Court for the District of South Dakota; 1985–1999	Succeeded by Karen Schreier
Preceded by John Bailey Jones	Chief Judge of the United States District Court for the District of South Dakota; 1994–1998	Succeeded by Lawrence L. Piersol
