= Adam B. Abelson =

American judge (born 1982)

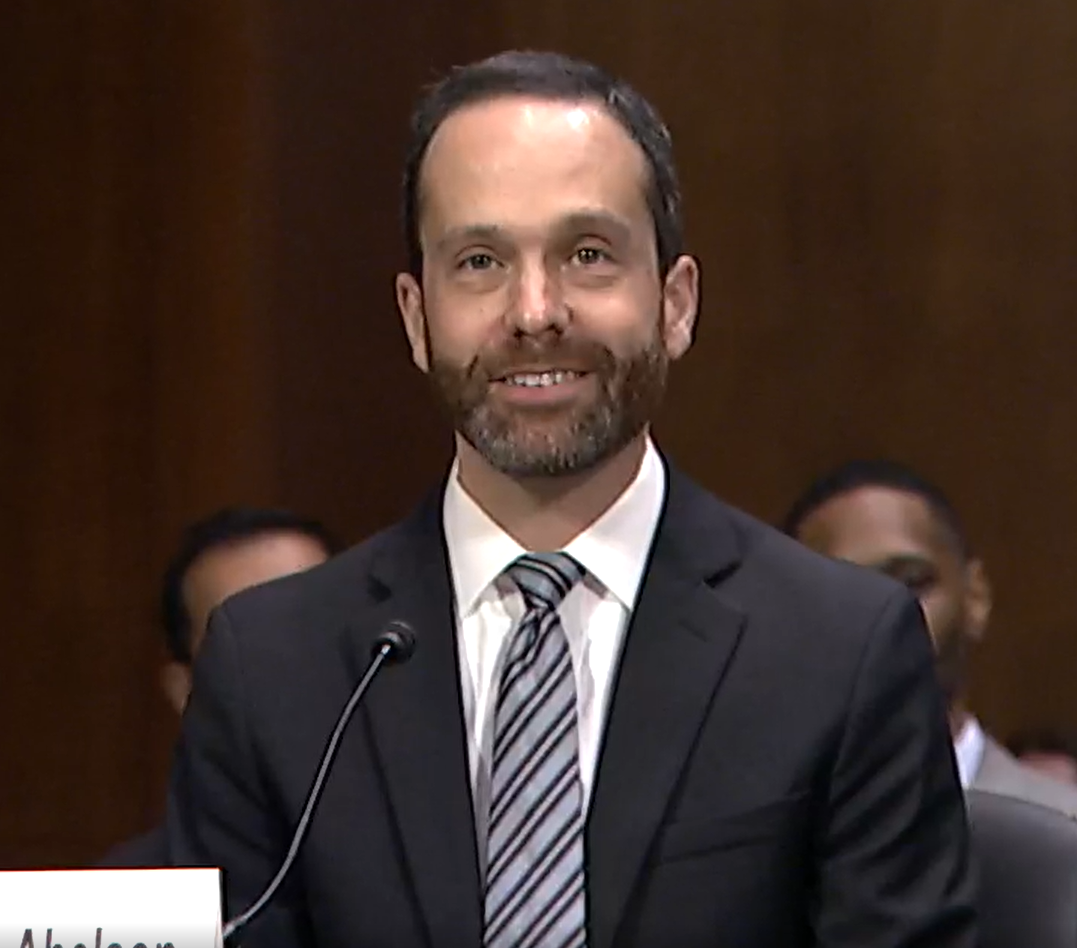

Judge of the United States District Court for the District of Maryland
- Incumbent
- Assumed office September 12, 2024
- Appointed by: Joe Biden
- Preceded by: James K. Bredar

Magistrate Judge of the United States District Court for the District of Maryland
- In office September 18, 2023 – September 12, 2024
- Preceded by: Beth P. Gesner
- Succeeded by: Chelsea J. Crawford

Personal details
- Born: Adam Ben Abelson; 1982 (age 43–44) Cleveland, Ohio, U.S.
- Education: Princeton University (BA); New York University (JD)

Adam Ben Abelson (born 1982) is an American lawyer who has served as a United States district judge of the United States District Court for the District of Maryland since 2024. He previously served as a United States magistrate judge of the same court from 2023 to 2024.

== Education ==
Abelson grew up in Shaker Heights, Ohio. He received a Bachelor of Arts, cum laude, from Princeton University in 2005 and a Juris Doctor, magna cum laude, from New York University School of Law in 2010.

== Career ==
From 2010 to 2011, he served as a law clerk to Judge Catherine C. Blake of the United States District Court for the District of Maryland and again from 2011 to 2012 to Judge Andre M. Davis of the United States Court of Appeals for the Fourth Circuit. From 2012 to 2023, Abelson worked in private practice at Zuckerman Spaeder LLP.

=== Federal judicial service ===
Abelson assumed office as a United States magistrate judge on September 18, 2023. He was appointed to an 8-year term which would expire in 2031, but he was appointed as a district judge instead.

=== District court service ===
On May 8, 2024, President Joe Biden announced his intent to nominate Abelson to serve as a United States district judge of the United States District Court for the District of Maryland. On May 14, 2024, his nomination was sent to the Senate. President Biden nominated Abelson to the seat vacated by Judge James K. Bredar, who assumed senior status on April 30, 2024. On June 5, 2024, a hearing on his nomination was held before the Senate Judiciary Committee. On July 11, 2024, his nomination was reported out of committee by a 12–9 vote. On September 9, 2024, the United States Senate invoked cloture on his nomination by a 50–40 vote. The following day, his nomination was confirmed by a 53–43 vote. He received his judicial commission on September 12, 2024. He was sworn in on September 16, 2024.

=== Notable cases ===
On February 21, 2025, Abelson issued a preliminary injunction against three provisions of executive orders 14151 and 14173, which would terminate all federal equity-related grants or contracts and require federal contractors to certify they do not operate DEI programs for purposes of FCA liability. In issuing his opinion, Abelson argued that the order failed to define terms such as "DEI" or "Equity related", resulting in the order being too vague and broad for a federal employee or grant recipient to reasonably determine their compliance. Additionally, Abelson noted the orders possible impacts impairing free speech rights, potentially discouraging businesses, organizations and public entities from openly supporting diversity, equity and inclusion. Soon after, The Fourth Circuit Court of Appeals lifted the hold, allowing for enforcement to go into effect and for the Trump administration to demonstrate whether the orders would abide by the First Amendment and anti-discrimination laws in ongoing litigation.

Legal offices
Preceded by James K. Bredar	Judge of the United States District Court for the District of Maryland; 2024–present	Incumbent
