= Karen Schreier =

American judge (born 1956)

Karen Elizabeth Schreier
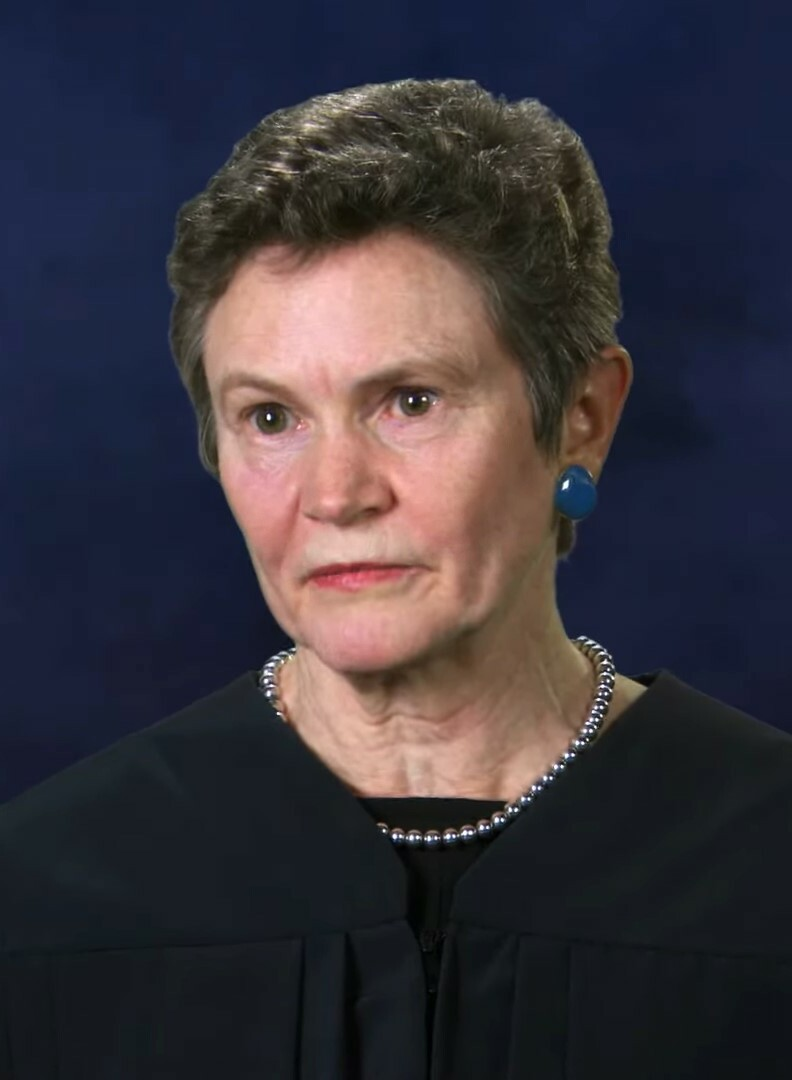
- Schreier in 2019

Senior Judge of the United States District Court for the District of South Dakota
- Incumbent
- Assumed office May 15, 2024

Chief Judge of the United States District Court for the District of South Dakota
- In office January 1, 2006 – January 1, 2013
- Preceded by: Lawrence L. Piersol
- Succeeded by: Jeffrey L. Viken

Judge of the United States District Court for the District of South Dakota
- In office July 7, 1999 – May 15, 2024
- Appointed by: Bill Clinton
- Preceded by: Richard Battey
- Succeeded by: Eric Schulte

36th United States Attorney for the District of South Dakota
- In office July 19, 1993 – July 7, 1999
- Appointed by: Bill Clinton
- Preceded by: Ted McBride (interim)
- Succeeded by: Ted McBride

Personal details
- Born: 1956 (age 69–70) Sioux Falls, South Dakota, U.S.
- Education: Saint Louis University (A.B., J.D.)

Karen Elizabeth Schreier (born 1956) is a senior United States district judge of the United States District Court for the District of South Dakota and was the 36th United States Attorney for the District of South Dakota.

== Early life and education ==
Born in Sioux Falls, South Dakota, Schreier earned an Artium Baccalaureus degree from Saint Louis University in 1978 and a Juris Doctor from the Saint Louis University School of Law in 1981.

== Career ==
Schreier worked as a judicial law clerk for South Dakota Supreme Court Justice Francis G. Dunn from 1981 until 1982. Schreier worked in private law practice in Sioux Falls from 1982 until 1993. She was elected as Chairwoman of the South Dakota Democratic Party in 1992, and stepped down at the end of the year. Schreier was one of the Democratic Party's electors for Bill Clinton and Al Gore in 1992.

She was recommended by Senator Tom Daschle to serve as United States Attorney for the District of South Dakota in 1993, and was nominated to the position by President Bill Clinton on July 19, 1993. Prior to her confirmation by the U.S. Senate, Schreier was appointed as interim U.S. Attorney by Attorney General Janet Reno on July 29, 1993, becoming the first woman to serve as U.S. Attorney in South Dakota. On September 21, 1993, the United States Senate confirmed her nomination by voice vote.

== Federal judicial service ==
On March 8, 1999, President Bill Clinton nominated Schreier to be a United States District Judge of the United States District Court for the District of South Dakota to replace Richard Battey, who had taken senior status on January 1, 1999. The United States Senate confirmed Schreier on June 30, 1999, as part of a package of nominees it approved in a 94–4 vote. Schreier received her commission on July 7, 1999. She served as Chief Judge from January 1, 2006, to January 1, 2013. She assumed senior status on May 15, 2024.

== See also ==
- List of first women lawyers and judges in South Dakota

== Sources ==
Legal offices
Preceded by Ted McBride (interim)	36th United States Attorney for the District of South Dakota; 1993-1999	Succeeded by Ted McBride
Preceded by Richard Battey	Judge of the United States District Court for the District of South Dakota; 1999–2024	Succeeded by Eric Schulte
Preceded by Lawrence L. Piersol	Chief Judge of the United States District Court for the District of South Dakota; 2006–2013	Succeeded by Jeffrey L. Viken
