= Joseph H. Gale =

American judge (born 1953)

Joe Gale
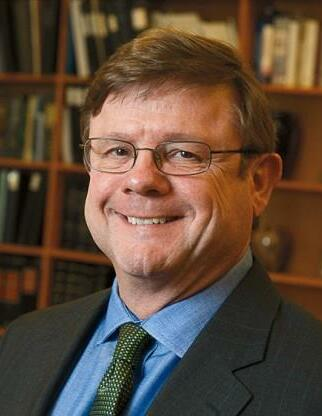

Senior Judge of the United States Tax Court
- In office August 26, 2023 – October 1, 2024

Judge of the United States Tax Court
- In office October 18, 2011 – August 26, 2023
- Appointed by: Barack Obama
- Preceded by: Himself
- Succeeded by: Cathy Fung
- In office February 6, 1996 – February 5, 2011
- Appointed by: Bill Clinton
- Preceded by: Edna G. Parker
- Succeeded by: Himself

Personal details
- Born: Joseph Harold Gale; August 26, 1953 (age 73) Suffolk, Virginia, U.S.
- Education: Princeton University (BA); University of Virginia (JD)

Joseph Harold Gale (born August 26, 1953) is a former judge of the United States Tax Court.

He holds a Bachelor of Arts in philosophy from Princeton University and obtained his Juris Doctor from the University of Virginia School of Law in 1980. After five years in private practice, he became an adviser to Senator Daniel Patrick Moynihan, and later held several positions in service to the United States Senate Committee on Finance until 1996.

He was appointed by President Bill Clinton as a judge on the United States Tax Court on February 6, 1996, for a term ending February 5, 2011. He was reappointed by President Barack Obama on July 8, 2011.

Gale is the first openly gay male appointed to the federal bench.

== Career ==
- Associate Attorney, Dewey Ballantine, Washington, DC, and New York, 1980–83
- Associate Attorney, Dickstein, Shapiro and Morin, Washington, DC, 1983–85
- Tax Legislative Counsel for Senator Daniel Patrick Moynihan, (D-NY), 1985–88
- Administrative Assistant and Tax Legislative Counsel, 1989; Chief Counsel, 1990–93
- Chief Tax Counsel, Committee on Finance, U.S. Senate, 1993–95
- Minority Chief Tax Counsel, Senate Finance Committee, January 1995-July 1995
- Minority Staff Director and Chief Counsel, Senate Finance Committee, July 1995-January 1996;

== Organizations ==
- District of Columbia Bar
- American Bar Association, Section of Taxation

== See also ==
- List of LGBT jurists in the United States

Legal offices
Preceded by Edna G. Parker	Judge of the United States Tax Court; 1996–2011	Succeeded by Himself
Preceded by Himself	Judge of the United States Tax Court; 2011–2023	Succeeded by Cathy Fung
