= Patricia E. Campbell-Smith =

American judge (born 1966)

Patricia Campbell-Smith
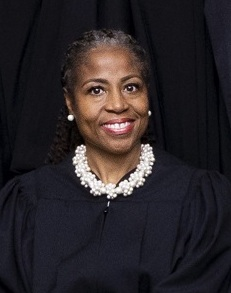
- Campbell-Smith in 2022

Chief Judge of the United States Court of Federal Claims
- In office October 21, 2013 – March 13, 2017
- Appointed by: Barack Obama
- Preceded by: Emily C. Hewitt
- Succeeded by: Susan G. Braden

Judge of the United States Court of Federal Claims
- In office September 19, 2013 – September 30, 2023
- Appointed by: Barack Obama
- Preceded by: Lawrence Baskir
- Succeeded by: Robin M. Meriweather

Personal details
- Born: Patricia Elaine Campbell; 1966 (age 59–60) Baltimore, Maryland, U.S.
- Education: Duke University (BS); Tulane University (JD)

Patricia Elaine Campbell-Smith (born 1966) is a former judge of the United States Court of Federal Claims and former chief special master of that court. She served as chief judge from October 21, 2013, to March 13, 2017, and she was the first African American (and African-American woman) chief judge to serve in that capacity.

== Biography ==
Campbell-Smith was born in 1966 in Baltimore. She received a Bachelor of Science degree, cum laude, in Electrical Engineering in 1987, from Duke University. She received a Juris Doctor, cum laude, in 1992, from Tulane Law School. She then served as a law clerk for Judge Martin Leach-Cross Feldman and as a law clerk for Judge Sarah S. Vance of the United States District Court for the Eastern District of Louisiana. Campbell-Smith then worked at the law firm of Liskow & Lewis in New Orleans. From 1998 to 2005 she served as a career law clerk for Judge Emily C. Hewitt of the United States Court of Federal Claims. She became a special master of the United States Court of Federal Claims in 2005 and Chief Special Master in 2011, serving in that role until she was confirmed to the court in 2013.

=== Claims court service ===
On March 19, 2013, President Barack Obama nominated Campbell-Smith to serve as a judge of the United States Court of Federal Claims, to the seat vacated by Judge Lawrence Baskir, who subsequently assumed senior status on April 1, 2013. The Senate Judiciary Committee held a hearing on her nomination on May 8, 2013, and reported her nomination to the floor by voice vote on June 6, 2013. The Senate confirmed her nomination by voice vote on September 17, 2013. She received her commission on September 19, 2013, and took the oath of office the same day. Her commission will expire on September 18, 2028, and her term will end that day, unless she is reappointed. On October 21, 2013, President Barack Obama designated Campbell-Smith to serve as Chief Judge of the United States Court of Federal Claims. She served as Chief Judge until March 13, 2017, when she was succeeded in that position by Judge Susan G. Braden. She retired from the bench on September 30, 2023.

== Notable cases ==
Following the shutdown of the federal government in 2013, Campbell-Smith ruled that the federal government violated federal labor law and may owe damages to employees affected by the shutdown. If employees seek damages, the ruling could raise the cost of the shutdown significantly.

In 2020, Campbell-Smith issued a preliminary injunction in a case concerning the U.S. Department of Defense’s Joint Enterprise Defense Infrastructure (JEDI) cloud computing contract. The contract, awarded to Microsoft, was challenged by Amazon Web Services, which alleged irregularities in the procurement process. The injunction temporarily halted work on the project pending further legal review.

Legal offices
Preceded by Lawrence Baskir	Judge of the United States Court of Federal Claims; 2013–2023	Succeeded by Robin M. Meriweather
Preceded by Emily Hewitt	Chief Judge of the United States Court of Federal Claims; 2013–2017	Succeeded by Susan G. Braden
