= Fred Joseph Nichol =

American judge

Senior Judge of the United States District Court for the District of South Dakota
- In office June 11, 1980 – December 31, 1996

Chief Judge of the United States District Court for the District of South Dakota
- In office 1966–1980
- Preceded by: Axel J. Beck
- Succeeded by: Andrew Wendell Bogue

Judge of the United States District Court for the District of South Dakota
- In office June 10, 1965 – June 11, 1980
- Appointed by: Lyndon B. Johnson
- Preceded by: George T. Mickelson
- Succeeded by: John Bailey Jones

Personal details
- Born: Fred Joseph Nichol; March 19, 1912 Sioux City, Iowa
- Died: December 31, 1996 (aged 84)
- Education: Yankton College (A.B.); University of South Dakota School of Law (LL.B.)

Fred Joseph Nichol (March 19, 1912 – December 31, 1996) was a United States district judge of the United States District Court for the District of South Dakota.

== Education and career ==
Born in Sioux City, Iowa, Nichol received an Artium Baccalaureus degree from Yankton College in 1933. He received a Bachelor of Laws from University of South Dakota School of Law in 1936. He was an assistant to the administrative assistant for the United States Senate in Washington, D.C. from 1936 to 1938. He was in private practice of law in Mitchell, South Dakota from 1938 to 1958. He was a United States Navy Lieutenant from 1943 to 1946. He was state's attorney of Davison County, South Dakota from 1947 to 1951. He was a member of the South Dakota House of Representatives from 1951 to 1952 and from 1957 to 1958. He was an Assistant United States Attorney of the District of South Dakota from 1951 to 1953. He was a Judge of the 4th Judicial Circuit Court of South Dakota from 1959 to 1965.

== Federal judicial service ==
Nichol was nominated by President Lyndon B. Johnson on May 18, 1965, to a seat on the United States District Court for the District of South Dakota vacated by Judge George T. Mickelson. He was confirmed by the United States Senate on June 9, 1965, and received his commission on June 10, 1965. He served as Chief Judge from 1966 to 1980. He assumed senior status on June 11, 1980. His service was terminated on December 31, 1996, due to his death.

== Sources ==
Legal offices
Preceded by George T. Mickelson	Judge of the United States District Court for the District of South Dakota; 1965–1980	Succeeded by John Bailey Jones
Preceded by Axel J. Beck	Chief Judge of the United States District Court for the District of South Dakota; 1966–1980	Succeeded by Andrew Wendell Bogue
