= Lawrence L. Piersol =

American judge (born 1940)

Lawrence Leroy Piersol
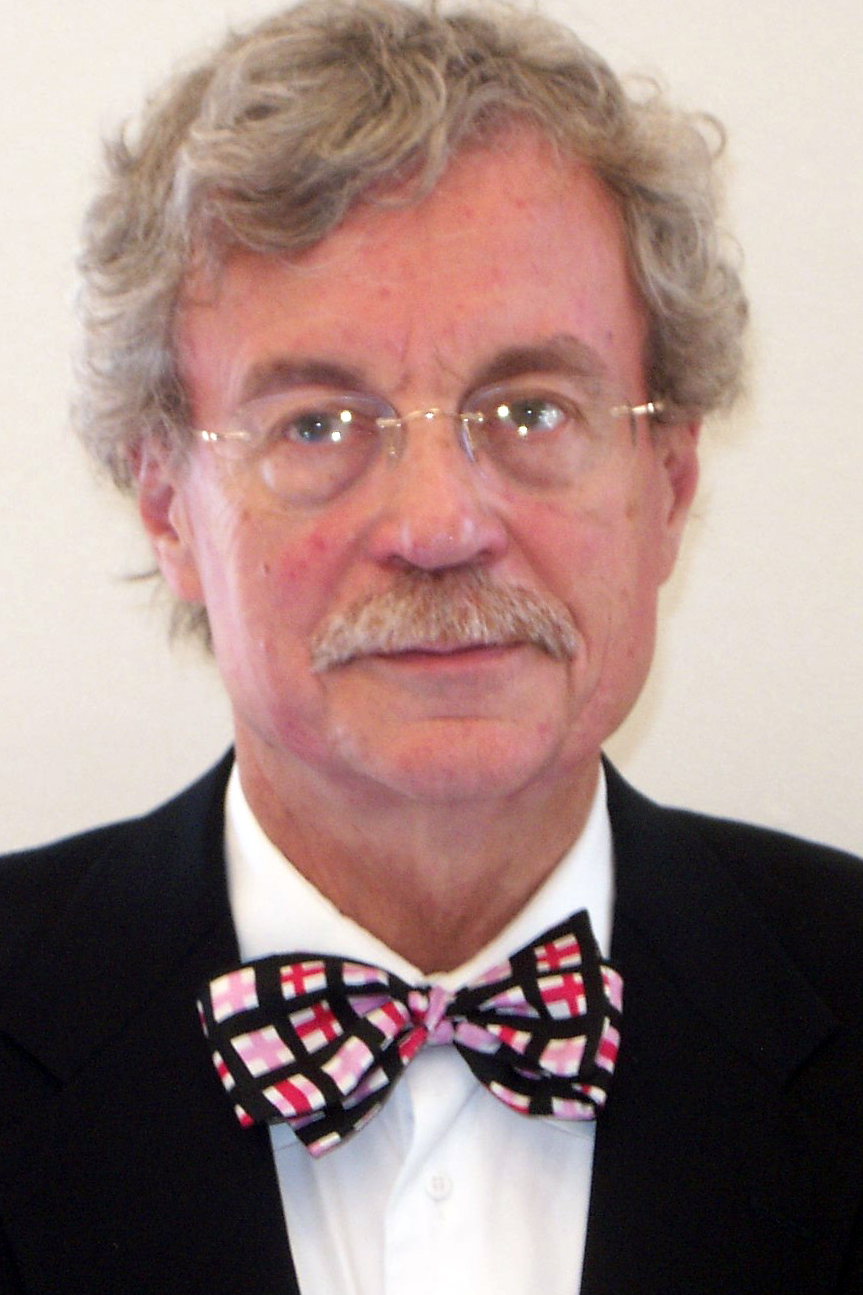

Senior Judge of the United States District Court for the District of South Dakota
- Incumbent
- Assumed office July 31, 2009

Chief Judge of the United States District Court for the District of South Dakota
- In office 1999–2005
- Preceded by: Richard Battey
- Succeeded by: Karen Schreier

Judge of the United States District Court for the District of South Dakota
- In office November 22, 1993 – July 31, 2009
- Appointed by: Bill Clinton
- Preceded by: Donald J. Porter
- Succeeded by: Jeffrey L. Viken

Personal details
- Born: Lawrence Leroy Piersol; October 21, 1940 (age 85) Vermillion, South Dakota
- Party: Democratic
- Education: University of South Dakota (BA, JD)

Military service
- Allegiance: United States
- Branch/service: United States Army
- Years of service: 1965–1968
- Rank: Captain
- Unit: J.A.G. Corps

Lawrence Leroy Piersol (born October 21, 1940) is a senior United States district judge of the United States District Court for the District of South Dakota.

== Early life and education ==
Born in Vermillion, South Dakota, Piersol received a Bachelor of Arts degree from the University of South Dakota in 1962 and a Juris Doctor from the University of South Dakota School of Law in 1965.

== Career ==
Piersol attended The Judge Advocate General's Legal Center and School at the University of Virginia and entered Judge Advocate General's Corps, United States Army, where he served in from 1965 to 1968. He was in private practice in Sioux Falls, South Dakota from 1968 to 1993. A member of the Democratic Party, he served in the South Dakota House of Representatives, serving as Minority Whip (1971 to 1972) and Majority Leader (1973 to 1974).

== Federal judicial service ==
On August 6, 1993, Piersol was nominated by President Bill Clinton to a seat on the United States District Court for the District of South Dakota vacated by Donald J. Porter. Piersol was confirmed by the United States Senate on November 20, 1993, and received his commission on November 22, 1993. He served as chief judge from 1999 to 2005 and assumed senior status on July 31, 2009.

Legal offices
Preceded by Donald J. Porter	Judge of the United States District Court for the District of South Dakota; 1993–2009	Succeeded by Jeffrey L. Viken
Preceded by Richard Battey	Chief Judge of the United States District Court for the District of South Dakota; 1999–2005	Succeeded by Karen Schreier
