= Jeffrey L. Viken =

American judge (born 1952)

Jeffrey Lynn Viken
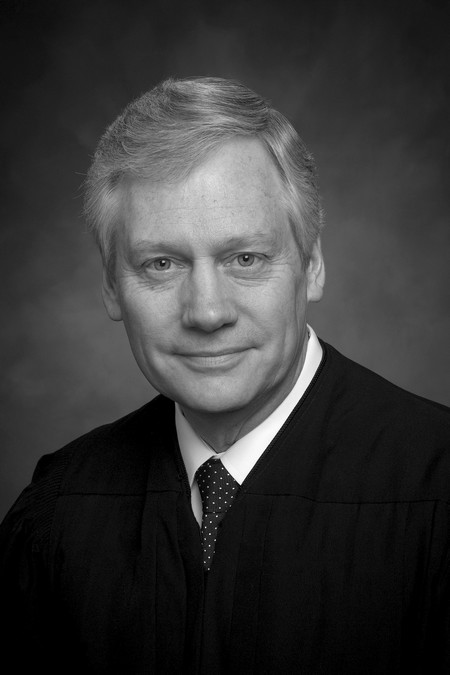

Senior Judge of the United States District Court for the District of South Dakota
- In office October 1, 2021 – October 1, 2023

Chief Judge of the United States District Court for the District of South Dakota
- In office January 1, 2013 – December 31, 2019
- Preceded by: Karen Schreier
- Succeeded by: Roberto Lange

Judge of the United States District Court for the District of South Dakota
- In office September 30, 2009 – October 1, 2021
- Appointed by: Barack Obama
- Preceded by: Lawrence L. Piersol
- Succeeded by: Camela C. Theeler

Personal details
- Born: Jeffrey Lynn Viken; August 8, 1952 (age 73) Huron, South Dakota, U.S.
- Education: University of South Dakota (BA, JD)

Jeffrey Lynn Viken (born August 8, 1952) is a former United States district judge of the United States District Court for the District of South Dakota.

== Early life and education ==
Born in Huron, South Dakota, Viken earned a Bachelor of Arts from the University of South Dakota in May 1974 and a Juris Doctor from the University of South Dakota School of Law in May 1977. He did not take the bar exam as he was admitted to the South Dakota bar under diploma privilege.

== Career ==
From 1977 to 1981, Viken served as an assistant United States attorney for the District of South Dakota and in 1981 became the Acting United States Attorney for the District of South Dakota. From 1981 to 1982, Viken was a partner in the Rapid City, South Dakota law firm of Finch, Viken & Viken, and then from 1981 to 1992, Viken was a partner in the Rapid City firm of Finch, Viken, Viken & Pechota. From 1992 to 2003, Viken served as a partner in the Rapid City law firm of Viken, Viken, Pechota, Leach & Dewell, LLP.

In 2003, Viken was appointed the federal public defender for the District of South Dakota by the United States Court of Appeals for the Eighth Circuit. In 2005, the Eighth Circuit appointed Viken the Federal Public Defender for the District of North Dakota as well to lead a combined-district organization for both North Dakota and South Dakota.

=== Federal judicial service ===
On June 25, 2009, President Barack Obama nominated Viken to a vacant seat on the United States District Court for the District of South Dakota that was created when Judge Lawrence L. Piersol assumed senior status. The United States Senate confirmed Viken on September 29, 2009 by a 99–0 vote. He received his commission the following day. He served as chief judge from 2013 to 2019. He assumed senior status on October 1, 2021. He retired from active service on October 1, 2023.

Legal offices
Preceded by Lawrence L. Piersol	Judge of the United States District Court for the District of South Dakota; 2009–2021	Succeeded by Camela C. Theeler
Preceded by Karen Schreier	Chief Judge of the United States District Court for the District of South Dakota; 2013–2019	Succeeded by Roberto Lange
