= Roberto Lange =

American judge (born 1963)

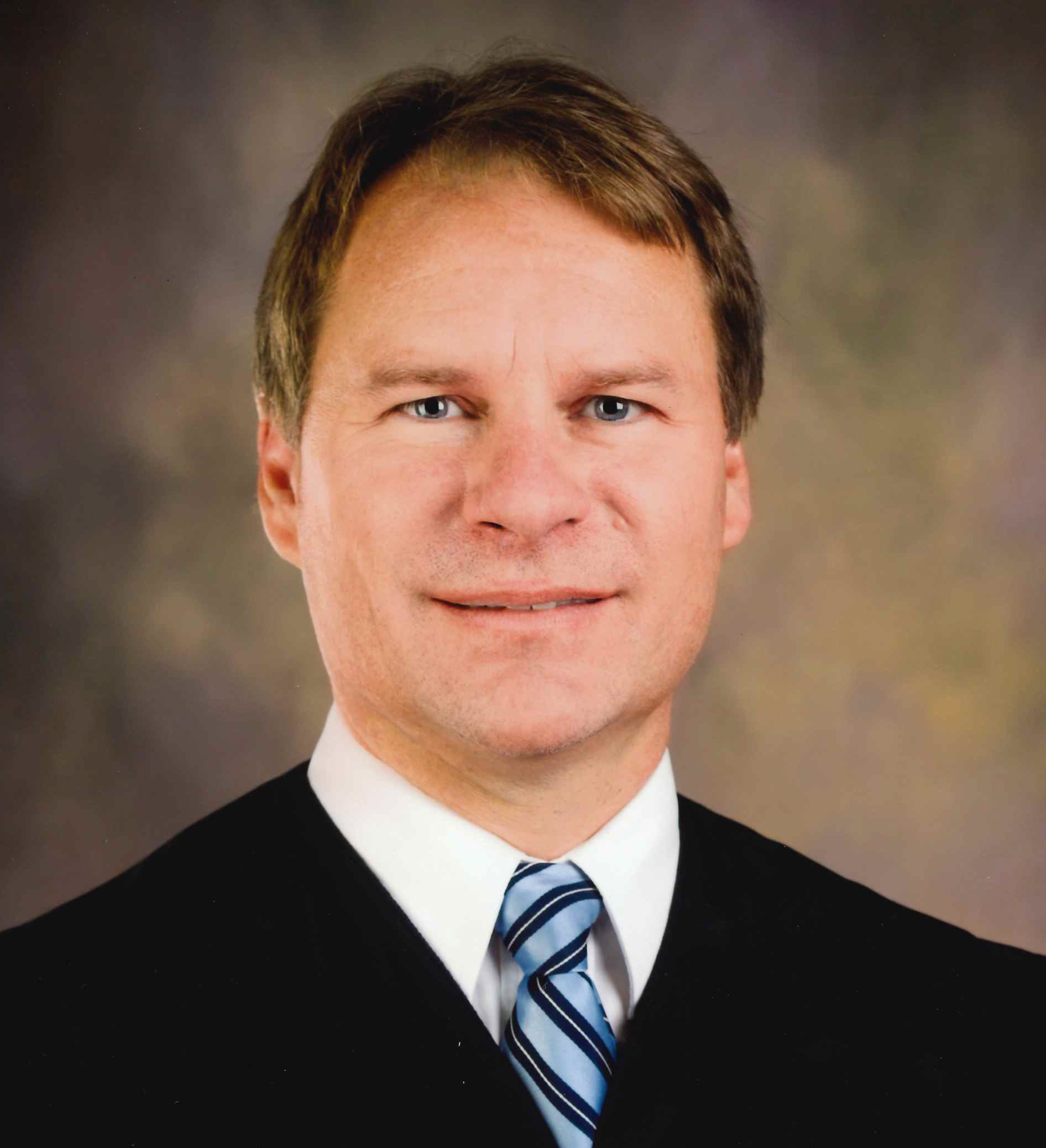

Chief Judge of the United States District Court for the District of South Dakota
- Incumbent
- Assumed office January 1, 2020
- Preceded by: Jeffrey L. Viken

Judge of the United States District Court for the District of South Dakota
- Incumbent
- Assumed office October 21, 2009
- Appointed by: Barack Obama
- Preceded by: Charles B. Kornmann

Personal details
- Born: Roberto Antonio Lange; April 22, 1963 (age 63) Pamplona, Spain
- Education: University of South Dakota (BA); Northwestern University (JD)

Roberto Antonio Lange (born April 22, 1963) is the chief United States district judge of the United States District Court for the District of South Dakota.

== Early life and education ==
Born in Pamplona, Spain, Lange was raised on a family farm near Madison, South Dakota. Lange earned a Bachelor of Arts degree from the University of South Dakota in 1985 where he graduated magna cum laude as a University Scholar having received the McGovern-Abourezk Human Rights Award. He attended Northwestern University School of Law and received his Juris Doctor in 1988, cum laude.

During his time at law school, Lange worked as an editor and board member for the Northwestern University Law Review, represented the law school on the Jessup International Moot Court team and board, and graduated with the Order of the Coif distinction as within the top ten percent of his class.

== Career ==
After graduating law school, Lange worked as a law clerk in 1988 and 1989 for Judge Donald J. Porter, of the District of South Dakota. Lange then joined the law firm Davenport, Evans, Hurwitz & Smith in Sioux Falls, South Dakota, in 1989.

Lange became a partner in 1993, and later served as the head of the firm's litigation section. Lange specialized in complex commercial litigation, products liability, and personal injury cases, class action, and ERISA litigation. During his twenty years with the firm, he handled business disputes for individuals, small businesses, and nationally known clients.

=== Rhines v. Weber ===
In 2005, Lange argued the case of Rhines v. Weber in front of the Supreme Court of the United States. As court-appointed counsel for a death-row inmate, he presented the issue of whether a federal court may stay a section 2254 habeas corpus petition which included exhausted and unexhausted claims. The Supreme Court ruled in favor of Lange's client, by a 9–0 vote, reversed the Court of Appeals for the Eighth Circuit, and allowed the district court to stay Rhines' petition. Ultimately, in 2019, Rhines was executed.

=== Federal judicial service ===
Upon the recommendation of U.S. Senator Tim Johnson, President Barack Obama nominated Lange to a vacant seat on the United States District Court for the District of South Dakota on July 8, 2009, that had been created by Judge Charles B. Kornmann assuming senior status. The American Bar Association Standing Committee on the Judicial Nominations voted unanimously to rate Lange as "well qualified." The United States Senate Committee on the Judiciary reported Lange's nomination out of committee on October 1, 2009. The United States Senate confirmed Lange by a 100–0 vote on October 21, 2009. He received his commission the same day. He became chief judge on January 1, 2020.

==== Seminal cases ====
In March 2020, Lange interpreted the 1868 Treaty of Fort Laramie in light of congressional enactments and the federal government's trust obligation to American Indian tribes to require the federal government to provide the Rosebud Sioux Tribe with "competent physician-led health care" in a suit that followed the Indian Health Services having closed the emergency department of the lone medical facility on the reservation. Lange however ruled that the State of South Dakota, and not the Cheyenne River Sioux Tribe, was granted the statutory right to set the speed limit on a United States Highway crossing through a reservation.

On June 2, 2021, Lange ruled against South Dakota Governor Kristi Noem's efforts to have fireworks at Mount Rushmore, finding four of the five reasons given by the National Park Service and Department of the Interior Secretary Deb Haaland were valid.

Before the 2022 election, Lange granted a preliminary injunction on a showing that Lyman County in South Dakota had violated the Voting Rights Act of 1965 by their five at-large commissioner districts, which had prevented the Lower Brule Sioux Tribe, though constituting 40% of the county's population, from ever electing a county commissioner. Lange ultimately allowed the 2022 election of commissioners to proceed under a plan that resolved the Voting Rights Act violation by 2024.

In April 2020, Lange issued a 106-page decision finding that five of six plaintiffs who had been forcibly catheterized at the direction of South Dakota law enforcement had viable claims for violation of their Fourth Amendment protections against unreasonable searches and seizures. Lange wrote that "Defendants' need to obtain plaintiffs' urine to prove low-level drug crimes did not justify subjecting the plaintiffs to involuntary catheterization, a highly invasive--and in these cases--degrading medical procedure."

== Service to Judiciary ==
Lange in February 2014 testified before the United States Sentencing Commission on implementation of the Violence Against Women Act of 2013. Lange's criminal case load is the highest among federal judges for Native American defendants and violent crime from reservations. Lange served on the national Tribal Issues Advisory Group, and testified before the Sentencing Commission in July 2016 concerning the report of the Tribal Issues Advisory Group.

Lange was elected by his peers in the Eighth Circuit to serve as its district representative to the Judicial Conference of the United States, which is the policy making and governing body of the federal judiciary, following six years on the Committee on Defender Services and as chair of its Budget and Data Subcommittee overseeing funding for the defense function for indigent criminal defendants in federal court.

Legal offices
Preceded by Charles B. Kornmann	Judge of the United States District Court for the District of South Dakota; 2009–present	Incumbent
Preceded by Jeffrey L. Viken	Chief Judge of the United States District Court for the District of South Dakota; 2020–present	Incumbent
