= Axel J. Beck =

American judge

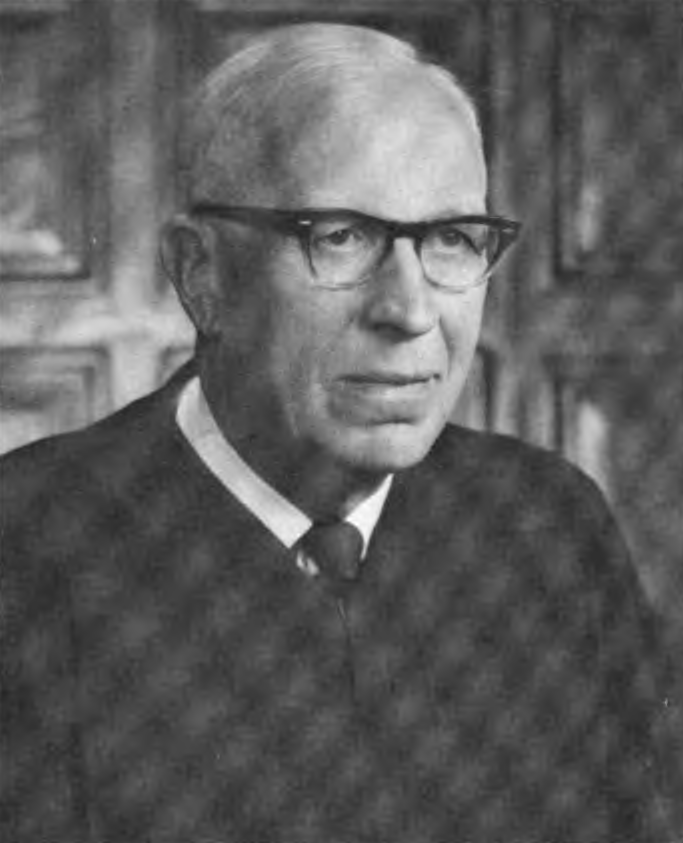

Senior Judge of the United States District Court for the District of South Dakota
- In office October 27, 1969 – September 2, 1981

Chief Judge of the United States District Court for the District of South Dakota
- In office 1965–1966
- Preceded by: George T. Mickelson
- Succeeded by: Fred Joseph Nichol

Judge of the United States District Court for the District of South Dakota
- In office March 4, 1958 – October 27, 1969
- Appointed by: Dwight D. Eisenhower
- Preceded by: Seat established by 71 Stat. 631
- Succeeded by: Andrew Wendell Bogue

Personal details
- Born: Axel John Beck; May 6, 1894 Timmersdala, Sweden
- Died: September 2, 1981 (aged 87) Aberdeen, South Dakota
- Resting place: Sunset Memorial Gardens; Aberdeen, South Dakota
- Party: Republican
- Education: Morningside College (A.B.); University of Chicago Law School (J.D.)

Axel John Beck (May 6, 1894 – September 2, 1981) was a United States district judge of the United States District Court for the District of South Dakota.

== Early life and education ==
Beck was born in the village of Timmersdala, Sweden as one of seven children born to Carl Melcher and Anna Helena (Jonson) Back. His father was a member of the Swedish military and the owner and operator of a lime kiln. In March 1906, at the age of 11, Beck immigrated to the United States arriving in South Dakota in the middle of April 1906. He became a naturalized citizen of the United States of May 17, 1913. He received an Artium Baccalaureus degree from Morningside College in 1920. He received a J.D. degree from the University of Chicago Law School in 1922. During World War I, he was a Second Lieutenant in the United States Army. He served in the Field Artillery at Camp Zachary Taylor, Kentucky, where it appears he was a junior officer of the 4th Company Convalescent Center.

== Career ==
Beck was in private practice in Chicago, Illinois, from 1923 to 1924. He was in private practice in Elk Point, Union County, South Dakota, from 1924 to 1958. He was an organizer of the Bank of Union County in Elk Point in 1943, and went on to serve as president and chairman of the board of the Bank of Union County from 1947 to 1958. He served as Union County Republican Chairman from 1936 to 1941 and served as a delegate to several South Dakota Republican state conventions. He was elected to serve as National Committeeman from South Dakota in 1948, and served in this capacity until 1957.

== Federal judicial service ==
Beck was nominated by President Dwight D. Eisenhower on January 31, 1958, to the United States District Court for the District of South Dakota, to a new seat created by 71 Stat. 631. He was confirmed by the United States Senate on February 28, 1958, and received his commission on March 4, 1958. He served as Chief Judge from 1965 to 1966. He assumed senior status on October 27, 1969. His service was terminated on September 2, 1981, due to his death in Aberdeen, South Dakota. He was interred at Sunset Memorial Gardens in Aberdeen.

== Sources ==
Legal offices
Preceded by Seat established by 71 Stat. 631	Judge of the United States District Court for the District of South Dakota; 1958–1969	Succeeded by Andrew Wendell Bogue
Preceded by George Theodore Mickelson	Chief Judge of the United States District Court for the District of South Dakota; 1965–1966	Succeeded by Fred Joseph Nichol
