= Eric Schulte =

American judge (born 1972)

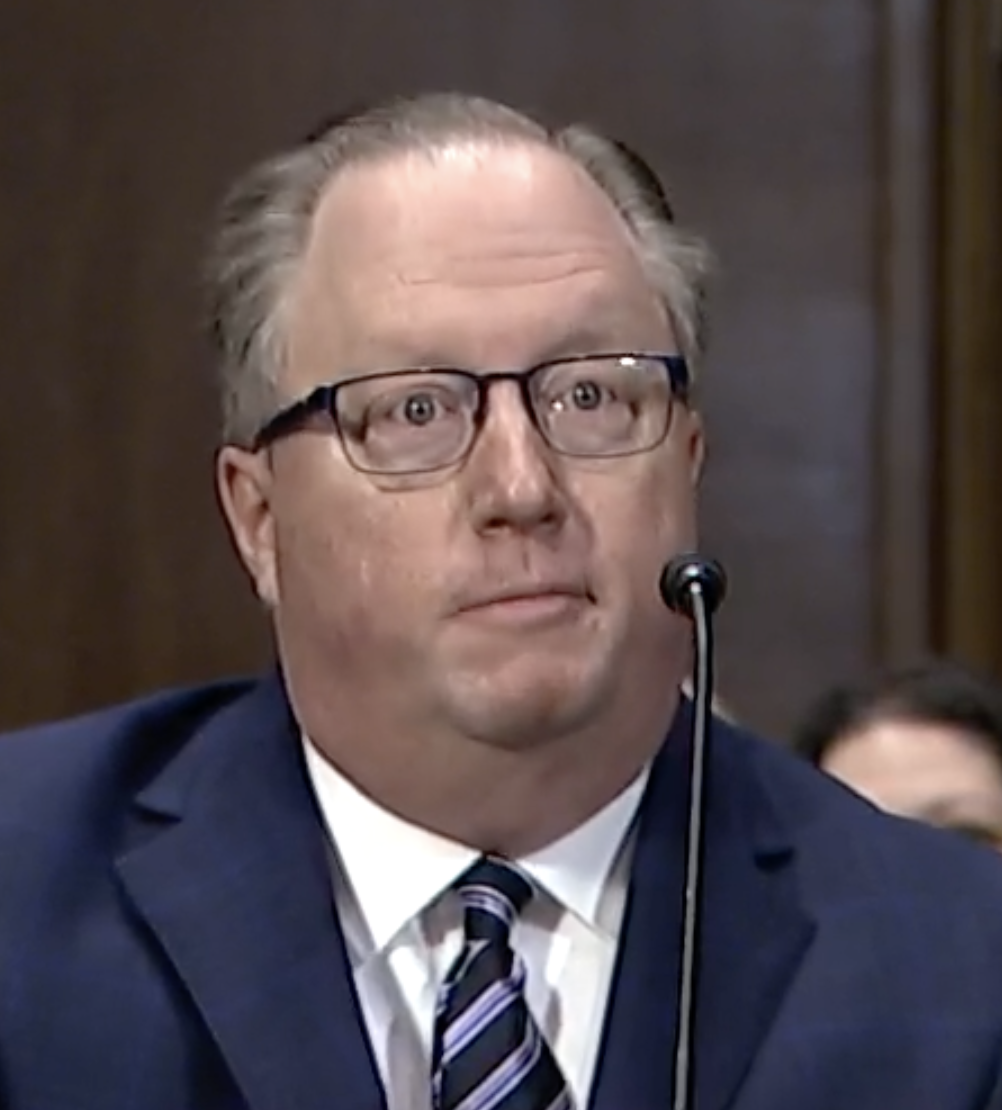

Judge of the United States District Court for the District of South Dakota
- Incumbent
- Assumed office June 3, 2024
- Appointed by: Joe Biden
- Preceded by: Karen Schreier

Personal details
- Born: Eric Claude Schulte; 1972 (age 53–54) Sioux Falls, South Dakota, U.S.
- Education: University of South Dakota (BA, JD)

Eric Claude Schulte (born 1972) is an American lawyer who is serving as a United States district judge of the United States District Court for the District of South Dakota.

== Education ==
Schulte earned a Bachelor of Arts from the University of South Dakota in 1994 and a Juris Doctor from the University of South Dakota School of Law in 1999.

== Career ==
From 1999 to 2000, Schulte served as a law clerk to the South Dakota Second Judicial Circuit in Sioux Falls. From 2000 to 2005, he served as an associate with Davenport, Evans, Hurwitz & Smith, L.L.P. and served as a partner with the same firm from 2006 to 2024.

=== Federal judicial service ===
In December 2023, Schulte was seen as a top contender for nomination to the federal bench. He was recommended to the White House by Senators John Thune and Mike Rounds. On February 7, 2024, President Joe Biden announced his intent to nominate Schulte to serve as a United States district judge of the United States District Court for the District of South Dakota. On February 8, 2024, his nomination was sent to the Senate. President Biden nominated Schulte to the seat being vacated by Judge Karen Schreier, who announced her intent to assume senior status upon confirmation of a successor. On March 6, 2024, a hearing on his nomination was held before the Senate Judiciary Committee. On April 11, 2024, his nomination was reported out of committee by a 12–9 vote. The Republicans on the committee opposed his nomination because of Schulte's prior writings on the issue of “preclearance”. On May 15, 2024, the United States Senate confirmed his nomination by a 61–33 vote. He received his judicial commission on June 3, 2024.

Legal offices
Preceded by Karen Schreier	Judge of the United States District Court for the District of South Dakota; 2024–present	Incumbent
