= Courts of South Dakota =

South Dakota Courts

Courts of South Dakota include: State courts of South Dakota

- South Dakota Supreme Court
  - South Dakota Circuit Courts (7 circuits)
  - South Dakota Magistrate Courts

Federal courts located in South Dakota

- United States District Court for the District of South Dakota
