= Alfred Lee Wyman =

American judge

Judge of the United States District Court for the District of South Dakota
- In office May 10, 1929 – December 15, 1953
- Appointed by: Herbert Hoover
- Preceded by: Seat established by 45 Stat. 1317
- Succeeded by: Seat abolished

Personal details
- Born: Alfred Lee Wyman; December 9, 1874 Yankton, Dakota Territory
- Died: December 15, 1953 (aged 79)
- Education: read law

Alfred Lee Wyman (December 9, 1874 – December 15, 1953) was a United States district judge of the United States District Court for the District of South Dakota.

== Education and career ==
Born in Yankton, Dakota Territory (State of South Dakota from November 2, 1889), Wyman read law in 1896 to enter the Bar, and was in private practice in Yankton intermittently from 1896 until 1929. He was state's attorney of Yankton County from 1905 to 1908 and again from 1915 to 1918. He was city attorney of Yankton from 1909 to 1914. He was a member of the South Dakota House of Representatives in 1909, and of the South Dakota Senate in 1911. He was the Mayor of Yankton from 1914 to 1924.

== Federal judicial service ==
On April 18, 1929, Wyman was nominated by President Herbert Hoover to a new seat on the United States District Court for the District of South Dakota created by 45 Stat. 1317. He was confirmed by the United States Senate on May 10, 1929, and received his commission the same day. On December 9, 1953, President Dwight D. Eisenhower certified Wyman involuntarily as disabled in accordance with the act of October 31, 1951, 65 Stat. 710, which entitled the President to appoint an additional judge for the court and provided that no successor to the judge certified as disabled be appointed. George Theodore Mickelson was appointed to the additional judgeship. Wyman died six days later on December 15, 1953.

== Sources ==
Legal offices
Preceded by Seat established by 45 Stat. 1317	Judge of the United States District Court for the District of South Dakota; 1929–1953	Succeeded by Seat abolished
