= Cathy Fung =

American judge

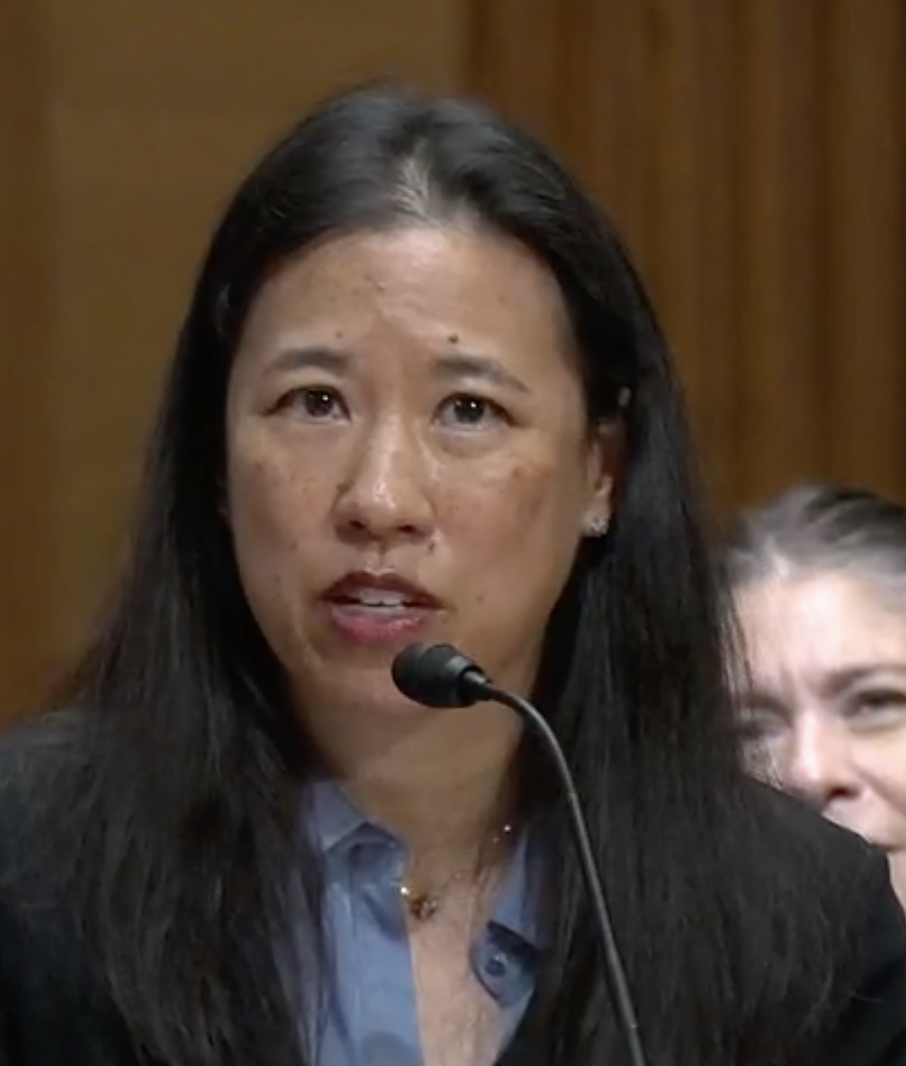

Judge of the United States Tax Court
- Incumbent
- Assumed office December 13, 2024
- Appointed by: Joe Biden
- Preceded by: Joseph H. Gale

Personal details
- Education: University of California, Los Angeles (BA); University of North Carolina, Chapel Hill (JD); New York University (LLM); Georgetown University (LLM)

Cathy Fung is an American lawyer who is serving as a judge of the United States Tax Court.

== Education ==
Fung received a Bachelor of Arts from the University of California, Los Angeles in 1995; a Juris Doctor from the University of North Carolina School of Law in 2003; a Master of Laws in taxation from New York University School of Law in 2004 and a Master of Laws in securities and financial regulation from Georgetown University Law Center in 2006.

== Career ==
From 2004 to 2006, Fung served as an attorney-advisor for Judge Robert Wherry of the United States Tax Court. From 2006 to 2009, she worked as a tax controversy and litigation associate at Dewey Ballantine (later Dewey & LeBoeuf). From 2009 to 2024, she served as a deputy area counsel at the Office of Chief Counsel (Large Business & International) in the Internal Revenue Service, where she held multiple attorney positions.

=== Tax court service ===
On May 9, 2024, President Joe Biden nominated Fung to serve as a judge of the United States Tax Court. She was nominated to the seat vacated by Judge Joseph H. Gale, who assumed senior status on August 26, 2023. On July 10, 2024, a hearing on her nomination was held before the Senate Finance Committee. On July 25, 2024, her nomination was reported out of committee by a 19–8 vote. On November 13, 2024, the United States Senate invoked cloture on her nomination by a 58–37 vote. The following day, her nomination was confirmed by a 59–37 vote. She was sworn in on December 13, 2024.

== Personal life ==
Fung is a California native and a resident of the District of Columbia.

Legal offices
Preceded by Joseph H. Gale	Judge of the United States Tax Court; 2024–present	Incumbent
