= Andrew Wendell Bogue =

American judge (1919-2009)

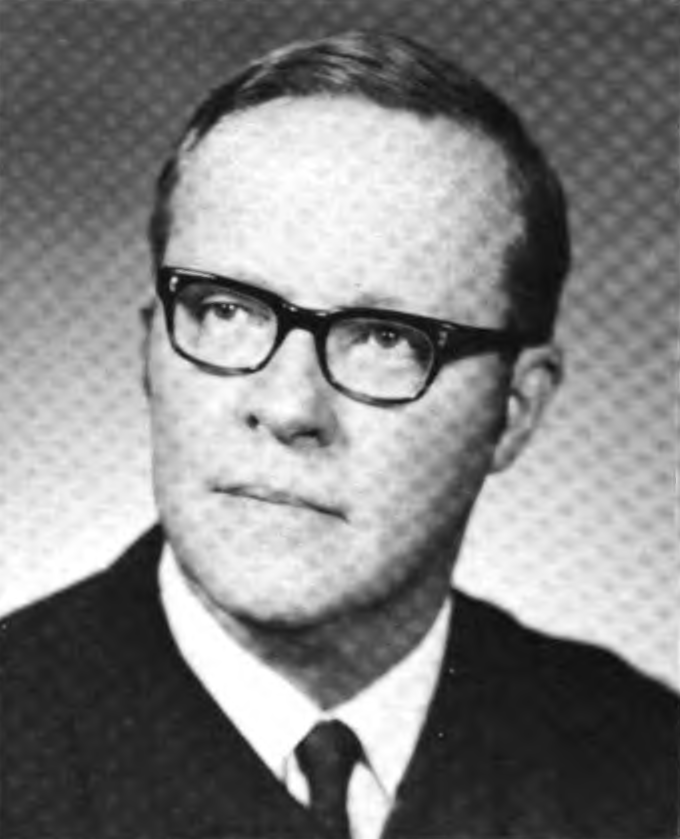

Senior Judge of the United States District Court for the District of South Dakota
- In office July 1, 1985 – June 10, 2009

Chief Judge of the United States District Court for the District of South Dakota
- In office 1980–1985
- Preceded by: Fred Joseph Nichol
- Succeeded by: Donald J. Porter

Judge of the United States District Court for the District of South Dakota
- In office April 24, 1970 – July 1, 1985
- Appointed by: Richard Nixon
- Preceded by: Axel J. Beck
- Succeeded by: Richard Battey

Personal details
- Born: Andrew Wendell Bogue; May 23, 1919 Yankton, South Dakota, U.S.
- Died: June 10, 2009 (aged 90) Hisega, South Dakota, U.S.
- Education: South Dakota State College (B.S.); University of South Dakota (LL.B.)

Military service
- Allegiance: United States
- Branch/service: United States Army
- Years of service: 1941-1952
- Rank: Captain
- Unit: J.A.G. Corps
- Battles/wars: World War II

Andrew Wendell Bogue (May 23, 1919 – June 10, 2009) was a United States district judge of the United States District Court for the District of South Dakota.

== Education and career ==
Born in Yankton, South Dakota, Bogue received a Bachelor of Science degree from South Dakota State College in 1941 and was in the United States Army Signal Corps during World War II, from 1943 to 1946. He received a Bachelor of Laws from the University of South Dakota School of Law in 1947. He entered private practice in Parker, South Dakota later that year.

He returned to the military as a First Lieutenant after attending The JAG School and entered U.S. Army JAG Corps. He was promoted to Captain in 1951. He retired from military service in 1952. He was thereafter a state's attorney of Turner County, South Dakota from 1952 to 1954, resuming his private practice in Parker from 1954 to 1957, and then in Canton, South Dakota until 1967. He was a judge of the Second Judicial District in Sioux Falls, South Dakota from 1967 to 1970.

== Federal judicial service ==
On March 19, 1970, Bogue was nominated by President Richard Nixon to a seat on the United States District Court for the District of South Dakota vacated by Judge Axel J. Beck. Bogue was confirmed by the United States Senate on April 23, 1970, and received his commission on April 24, 1970. He served as Chief Judge from 1980 to 1985, assuming senior status on July 1, 1985, and continuing to serve in that capacity until his death, on June 10, 2009, in Hisega, South Dakota.

== Sources ==
- Google Books
- Andrew Wendell Bogue's obituary

Legal offices
| Preceded by Axel J. Beck | Judge of the United States District Court for the District of South Dakota; 1970–1985 | Succeeded by Richard Battey |
| Preceded by Fred Joseph Nichol | Chief Judge of the United States District Court for the District of South Dakota; 1980–1985 | Succeeded by Donald J. Porter |
