= Robin M. Meriweather =

American judge (born 1974)

Robin Meriweather
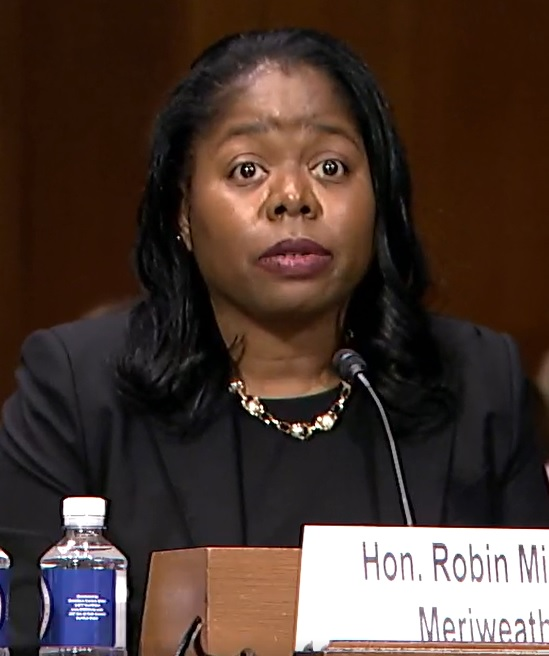

Judge of the United States Court of Federal Claims
- Incumbent
- Assumed office August 8, 2024
- Appointed by: Joe Biden
- Preceded by: Patricia E. Campbell-Smith

Personal details
- Born: Robin Michelle Meriweather; 1974 (age 51–52) Detroit, Michigan, U.S.
- Education: University of Michigan (BA); Yale University (JD)

Robin Michelle Meriweather (born 1974) is an American lawyer who has served as a judge of the United States Court of Federal Claims since 2024. She previously served as a United States magistrate judge for the United States District Court for the District of Columbia from 2017 to 2024.

== Education ==
Meriweather received a Bachelor of Arts from the University of Michigan in 1995 and a Juris Doctor from Yale Law School in 1998.

== Career ==
From 1998 to 1999, Meriweather served as a law clerk for Judge Merrick Garland of the United States Court of Appeals for the District of Columbia Circuit. From 1999 to 2007, she worked in private practice as an associate at Jenner & Block in their Washington, D.C. office. From 2007 to 2017, she served as an assistant United States attorney in the U.S. Attorney's Office for the District of Columbia, including as the deputy chief of the Civil Division in that office from 2011 to 2017. She served as a United States magistrate judge of the United States District Court for the District of Columbia from January 10, 2017 to August 8, 2024.

=== Court of claims service ===
On December 19, 2023, President Joe Biden announced his intent to nominate Meriweather to serve as a judge of the United States Court of Federal Claims. On January 10, 2024, her nomination was sent to the Senate. President Biden nominated Meriweather to the seat vacated by Judge Patricia E. Campbell-Smith, who retired on September 30, 2023. On January 24, 2024, a hearing on her nomination was held before the Senate Judiciary Committee. During her confirmation hearing, she was questioned by Republican senators over her record and prior experience as a magistrate judge on the D.C. district court. She was asked about her decision to grant a 21-day release motion for a defendant in a child pornography case so that he could seek cancer treatment. Her decision was reversed by the D.C. Circuit. On February 29, 2024, her nomination was reported out of committee by a 12–9 vote. On July 9, 2024, the United States Senate invoked cloture on her nomination by a 53–42 vote. On July 11, 2024, her nomination was confirmed by a 52–39 vote. She received her judicial commission on August 8, 2024, and took the oath of office on August 9, 2024.

== See also ==
- List of African American jurists
- List of African American federal judges

Legal offices
Preceded by Patricia E. Campbell-Smith	Judge of the United States Court of Federal Claims; 2024–present	Incumbent
