= Federal Building and United States Courthouse (Sioux Falls, South Dakota) =

- Federal Building and U.S. Courthouse
- U.S. National Register of Historic Places
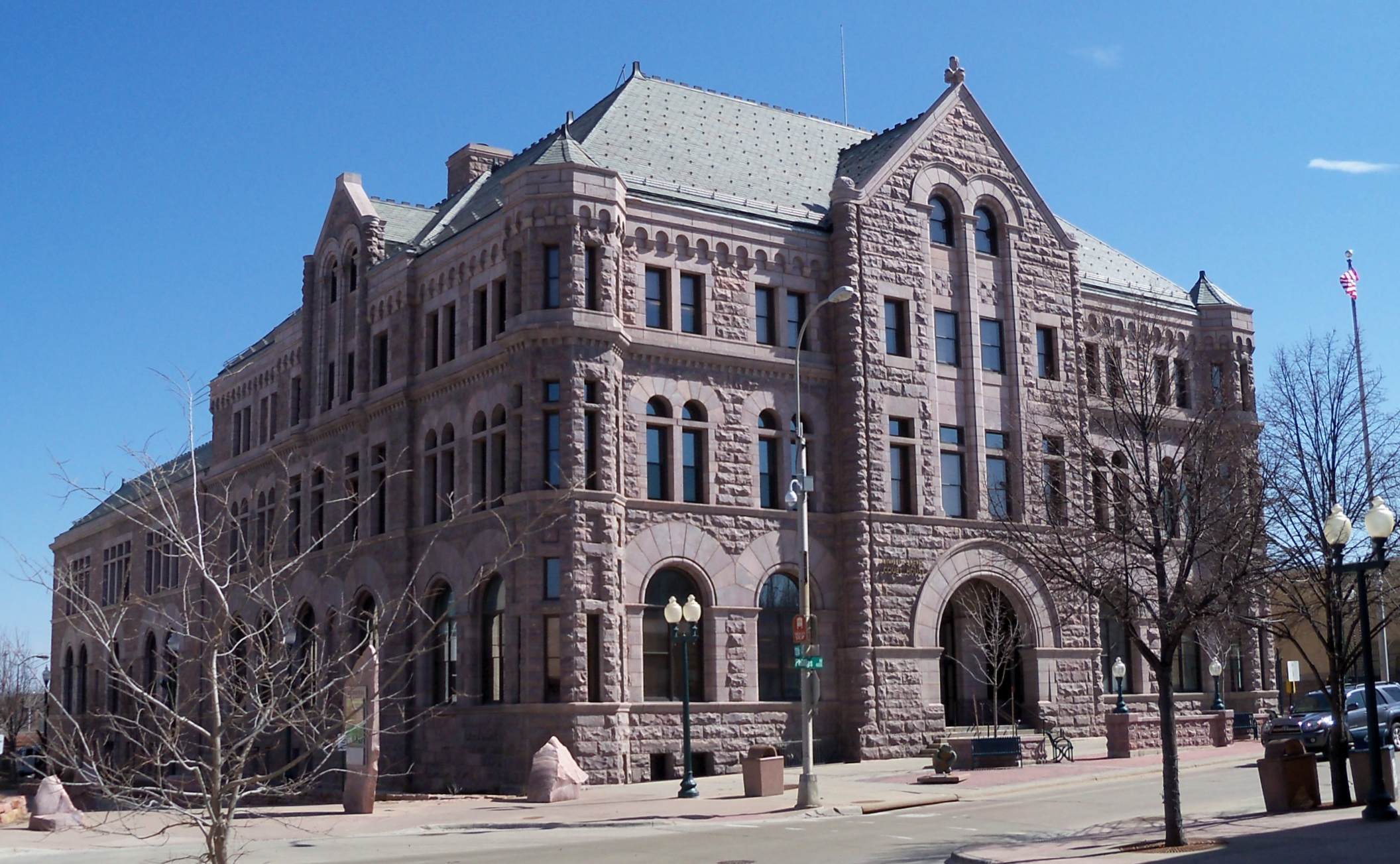
- Federal Building and United States Courthouse, March 2010

- Location within South Dakota Location within the United States
- Map showing the location of Federal Building and U.S. Courthouse, Sioux Falls
- Location: 400 S. Phillips Ave; Sioux Falls, South Dakota
- Coordinates: 43°32′36″N 96°43′33″W
- Area: less than one acre
- Built: 1892
- Architectural style: Romanesque
- NRHP reference No.: 74001894
- Added to NRHP: May 2, 1974

The Federal Building and U.S. Courthouse, also known as U.S. Courthouse, Sioux Falls, is a historic federal office and courthouse building located at Sioux Falls in Minnehaha County, South Dakota. The building is still in use as a federal courthouse, being the seat of the United States District Court for the District of South Dakota. The structure is listed on the National Register of Historic Places.

== Building history ==
The monumental Romanesque U.S. Courthouse in Sioux Falls, South Dakota, embodied and validated the federal government's faith in westward expansion. The U.S. Government purchased a two-lot parcel dedicated to the construction of a Federal building in Sioux Falls, South Dakota, on July 22, 1891. South Dakota's first senator, Richard Pettigrew, introduced a bill to fund the structure, recommending that native Sioux quartzite be used for its construction. Willoughby J. Edbrooke, Supervising Architect of the Treasury and architect for the original portion of the building, designed it to house a post office on the entry level and a courthouse on the second floor. Originally constructed between 1892 and 1895, the building was expanded in 1911 and again in 1931.

In the early 1890s, South Dakota was a young state that had recently witnessed a major conflict between the U.S. Army and Native Americans at the Wounded Knee Massacre. The construction of a Federal building at Sioux Falls was intended to create a sense of stability and permanence among the newly arrived settlers.

Since its construction, the federal building has been a landmark in the downtown area, where it occupies most of an entire city block. In May 1995, the Centennial Observance of the building was held to celebrate 100 years of service to the federal government. During the celebration, the building was rededicated and a historical marker, provided by the Minnehaha County Historical Society, was unveiled. At the same time, the building was officially renamed as the U.S. Courthouse. Historic memorabilia, photographs, and art were displayed throughout the building.

== Architecture ==
The original 1892-1895 building was a two-story structure with an attic and basement built in the Romanesque style. Popularized by master architect Henry Hobson Richardson in the late 19th century, the Romanesque style was widely emulated by other architects throughout the nation. The character-defining Romanesque features of the U.S. Courthouse, an excellent example of the style, include handsome, wide (Romanesque) arches; rough-hewn stone finishes accented with smooth stones; and heavy, monumental massing.

The exterior walls are primarily of rose-colored quartzite (also known as jasper), which was shipped by train from nearby Jasper, Minnesota. Like granite, quartzite is durable with a similar texture and workability. Unlike granite, however, the surface of quartzite has a slightly translucent appearance. A smoothly finished quartzite that looks much like terracotta was used for the trim and voussoirs (wedge-shaped stones in the arches).

Belt courses encircle the building, delineating the interior floors. A distinctive cornice, which echoes the arched shape of the windows on the first and second stories, is topped by a slate roof. The roof form is primarily hipped, crossed by central gable parapet-wall dormers and terminated at each end with octagonal turrets. Entrance to the building is gained through a large, central Romanesque arch on the Phillips Street facade.

In 1911, under James Knox Taylor, Supervising Architect of the Treasury, the building was extended 30 feet to the east, and the third floor was added. Substantial interior alterations, compatible with the original design, were also completed. The post office lobby was extended, and a new marble stair was placed in the southwest portion of the original building, replacing the turret stair. An elevator was installed adjacent to the stair lobby. The new public hallways, lobbies, and stairs featured marble baseboards, treads, and landings, and terrazzo with a marble border served as flooring.

In 1931, a two-story wing with a full basement was added to the rear (east side) of the building under the direction of the Office of the Supervising Architect under James A. Wetmore. Like the 1911 alterations, this addition was sympathetic to the original building. The same quartzite stone was used, and cornice and fenestration patterns found in the existing structure were repeated in the addition. Handsome decorative elements and finishes in these areas included marble wainscot and trim, marble and terrazzo flooring, and brass elevator doors and frames. The basement and first floor are organized around a central corridor flanked with offices. The second and third floors have offices located around the perimeter as well as within the central core of the building. The large, second-floor courtroom, and another on the first floor, remain.

Interior modernizations have occurred during the course of the building's history, including alterations made in 1968 when the post office relocated to another building. However, many features remain, including the 1911 iron and marble stairs, the oak-paneled courtroom, and two small vaults with mural scenes painted on the doors.

In 1974, the building was listed in the National Register of Historic Places.

== Significant events ==
- 1892-1895: The building is constructed.
- 1895: Judge Alonzo J. Edgerton is appointed as the first judge to occupy the courthouse.
- 1911-1913: The first major addition, including a 30-foot extension to the east and a complete third story, is constructed.
- 1931-1933: A two-story wing is added to the rear.
- 1968: The post office relocates, resulting in interior and exterior modifications.
- 1974: The building is listed in the National Register of Historic Places.
- 1995: The building's centennial celebration occurs.

== Building facts ==
- Architects: W.J. Edbrooke, with additions by James Knox Taylor (1911) and James A. Wetmore (1931)
- Construction Dates: 1892–1895, 1911–1913, 1931
- Landmark Status: Listed in the National Register of Historic Places
- Location: Corner of Phillips and Twelfth Streets
- Architectural Style: Romanesque
- Primary Materials: Jasper quartzite
- Prominent Feature: Romanesque design elements, such as arched openings and stone finishes
