= United States Post Office and Courthouse–Aberdeen =

- U.S. Post Office and Courthouse–Aberdeen
- U.S. National Register of Historic Places
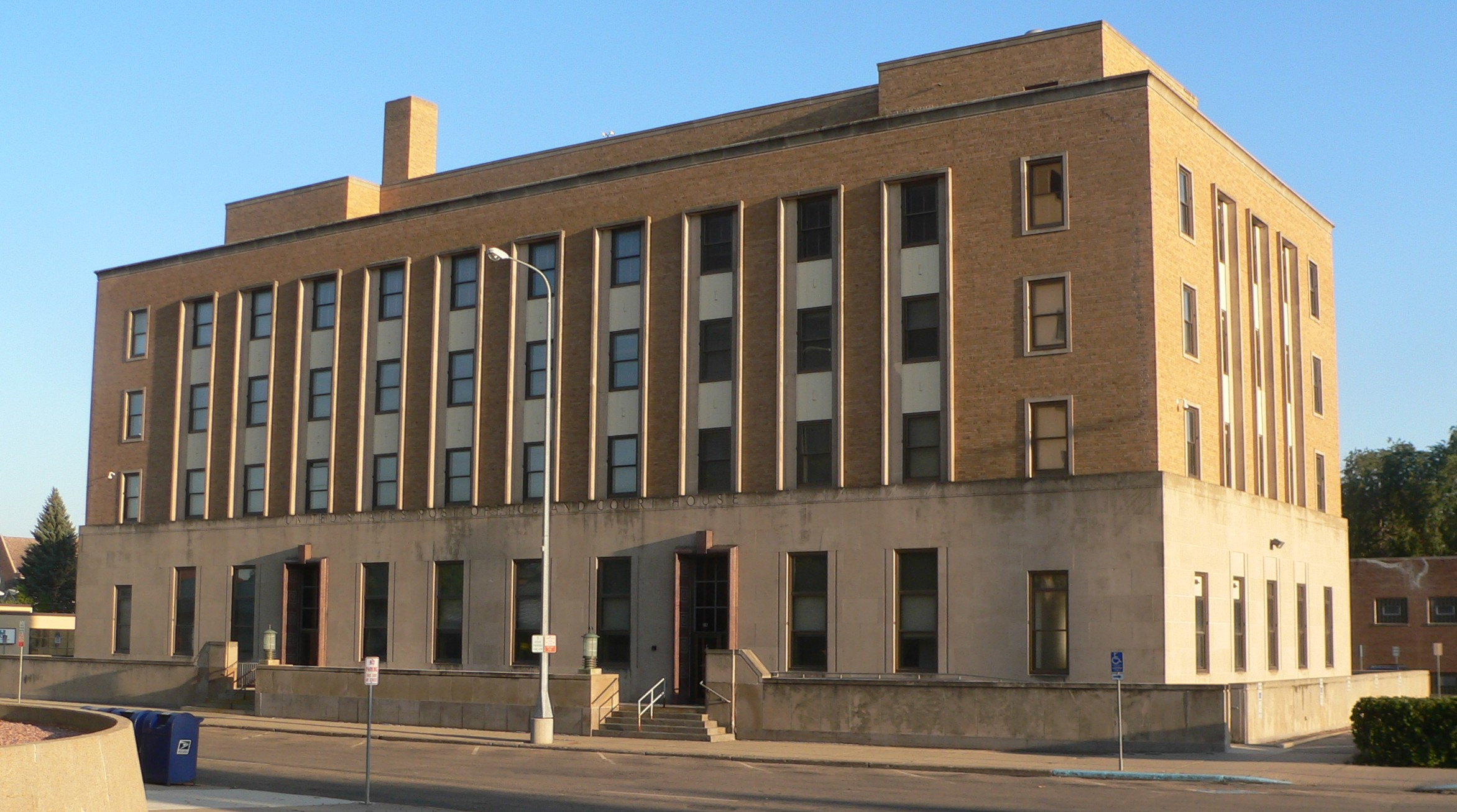

- Location within South Dakota Location within the United States
- Location: 102 4th Ave. SE, Aberdeen, South Dakota
- Coordinates: 45.460880°N 98.485791°W
- Built: 1936
- Built by: Paul Steenberg Construction Co.
- Architect: William Dewey Foster
- Architectural style: Art Deco
- NRHP reference No.: 06000931
- Added to NRHP: October 4, 2006

The U.S. Post Office and Courthouse in Aberdeen, South Dakota, was built in 1936 with Art Deco features. It is a steel-framed four-story rectangular building, 67 feet (20 m) tall on a 150 feet (46 m) by 64 feet (20 m) base, with a one-story 100 feet (30 m) by 64 feet (20 m) extension (part of the original).

It was listed on the National Register of Historic Places in 2006. Historically, it served as a government office building, post office, and courthouse.

== See also ==
- Yule marble
- List of United States post offices
