= List of justices of the South Dakota Supreme Court =

Following is a list of past and present justices of the South Dakota Supreme Court, including justices of the Dakota Territorial Supreme Court.

== Current justices ==
The current justices of the South Dakota Supreme Court are as follow:

Title	Name	Appointment	Current term ends	Law school	Appointed by	Bar admission
Chief Justice	Steven R. Jensen	2021	2028	University of South Dakota	Dennis Daugaard	South Dakota bar exam, 1988
Associate Justice	Mark Salter	2018	2030	University of South Dakota	Dennis Daugaard	South Dakota bar exam, 1993
Associate Justice	Patricia DeVaney	2019	2030	University of Virginia	Kristi Noem	South Dakota bar exam, 1993
Associate Justice	Scott P. Myren	2021	2032	Rutgers Law	Kristi Noem	South Dakota bar exam, 1990
Associate Justice	Robert Gusinsky	2025	2028	University of South Dakota	Larry Rhoden	

== Past justices ==
=== South Dakota Supreme Court ===
- Dighton Corson, 1889–1913
- Alphonso G. Kellam, 1889–1896
- John E. Bennett, 1889–1893 (died in office)
- Howard G. Fuller, 1894–1908
- Charles S. Whiting, 1908–1922 (died in office)
- James H. McCoy, 1909–1921
- Ellison G. Smith, 1909–1923
- Samuel C. Polley, 1913–1947
- John Howard Gates, 1913–1927
- Frank Anderson, 1921–1925
- Carl G. Sherwood, 1922–1931
- Charles Hall Dillon, 1923–1927
- Dwight Campbell, 1925–1937
- Newton D. Burch, 1926–1931
- James Brown, 1927
- Frederick A. Warren, 1931–1944
- Herbert B. Rudolph, 1931–1957
- St. Clair Smith, 1937–1962
- Charles R. Hayes, 1947–1951
- Boyd Leedom, 1951–1955
- Charles S. Hanson, 1956–1973
- Alex Rentto, 1955–1971
- Chief justice Frank Biegelmeier, 1959–1974
- Fred J. Homeyer, 1962–1971
- Chief justice Roger L. Wollman, 1971
- James M. Doyle, 1971–1976 (died in office)
- Fred R. Winans, 1971–1976
- Chief justice Francis G. Dunn, 1973–1985
- Oren P. Coler, 1974–1977
- Robert E. Morgan, 1976–1991
- Laurence J. Zastrow, 1976–1978
- Donald J. Porter, 1977–1979
- Chief justice Jon Fosheim, 1978–1986
- Frank Henderson, 1979–1994
- Chief justice George W. Wuest, 1984–1995
- Richard W. Sabers, 1986–2008
- Chief justice Robert A. Miller, 1986–2001
- John K. Konenkamp, 1994–20??
- Steven L. Zinter, 2002–2018
- Judith Meierhenry, 2002–2011
- David Gilbertson, 1995–2021, Chief 2001–2021
- Janine M. Kern, 2015–2025
