= List of South Dakota State University people =

This is a list of prominent alumni of South Dakota State University.

== Academia, science, and technology ==
- Cleveland L. Abbott, professor and coach of Tuskegee University and namesake of Tuskegee's Abbott Memorial Alumni Stadium
- John Merton Aldrich (1888), zoologist, entomologist and curator of insects at the United States National Museum
- Gene Amdahl (1948), architect of the IBM 360, IBM 704, IBM 709, and Amdahl's Law
- Stephen Foster Briggs (1907), inventor of the Briggs & Stratton engine
- Robert H. Burris (1936), National Academy of Sciences professor of Biochemistry at the University of Wisconsin–Madison
- Irwin Gunsalus, discovered lipoic acid, founder of United Nations International Center for Genetic Engineering and Biotechnology, and chair of National Academy of Sciences
- Cheris Kramarae, feminist scholar
- John Mortvedt (1953), soils scientist
- Vern L. Schramm (1963), professor of Biochemistry at the Albert Einstein College of Medicine
- Theodore Schultz (1928), economist, Nobel laureate, 1979 Nobel Prize in Economics, and chair of Chicago School of Economics
- Jim Sutton, stock contractor
- Roger Zwieg (1964), NASA astronaut and flight instructor

== Arts and literature ==
- Jeanine Basinger (1958), film historian
- Kang-i Sun Chang (1972), chair of the East Asian Languages and Literatures at Yale University
- Harvey Dunn (1902), painter
- James Pollock (1965), abstract and landscape artist

== Business ==
- Nizar Al-Adsani (1983), CEO of Kuwait Petroleum Corporation

== Government and law ==
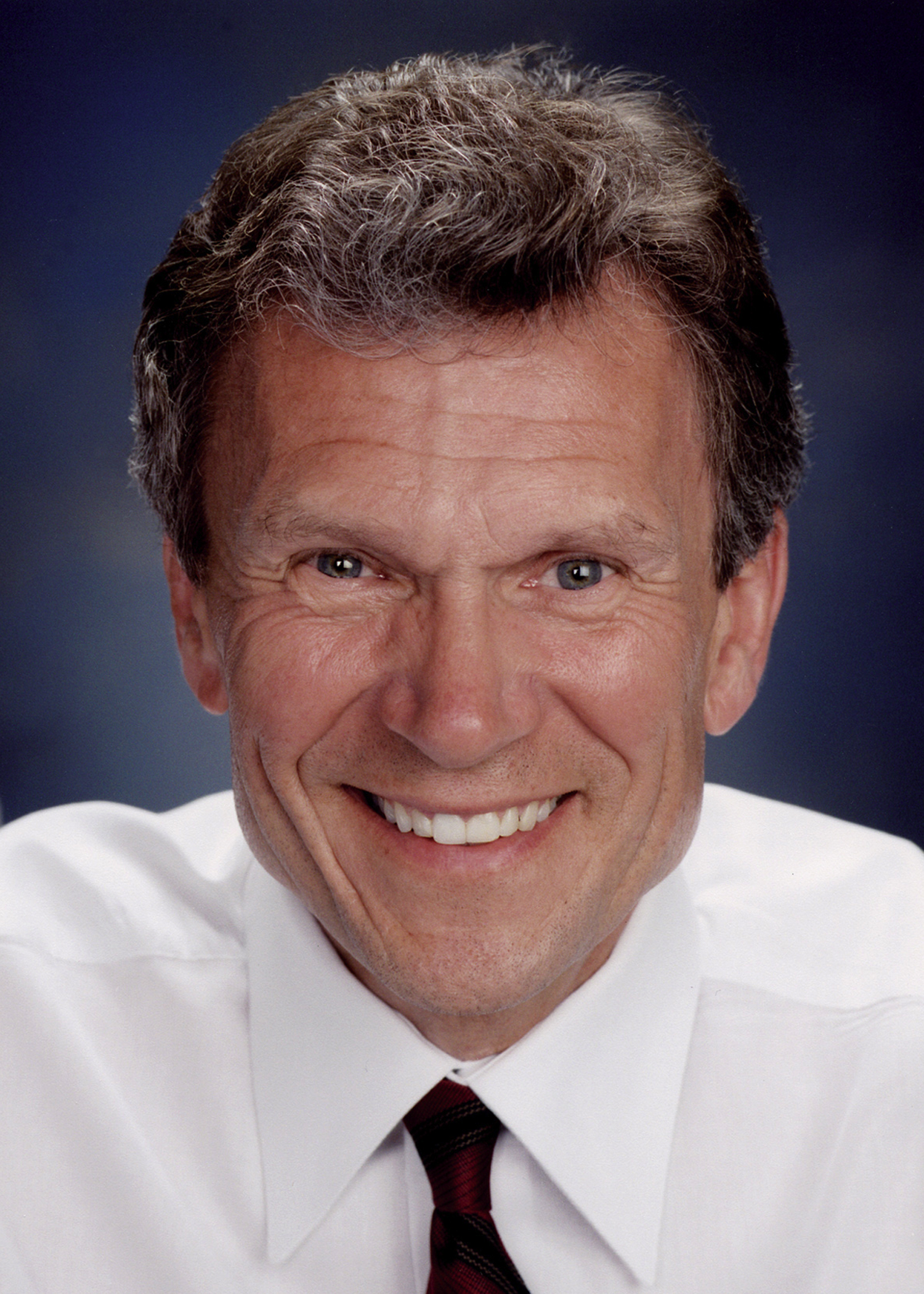
Tom Daschle

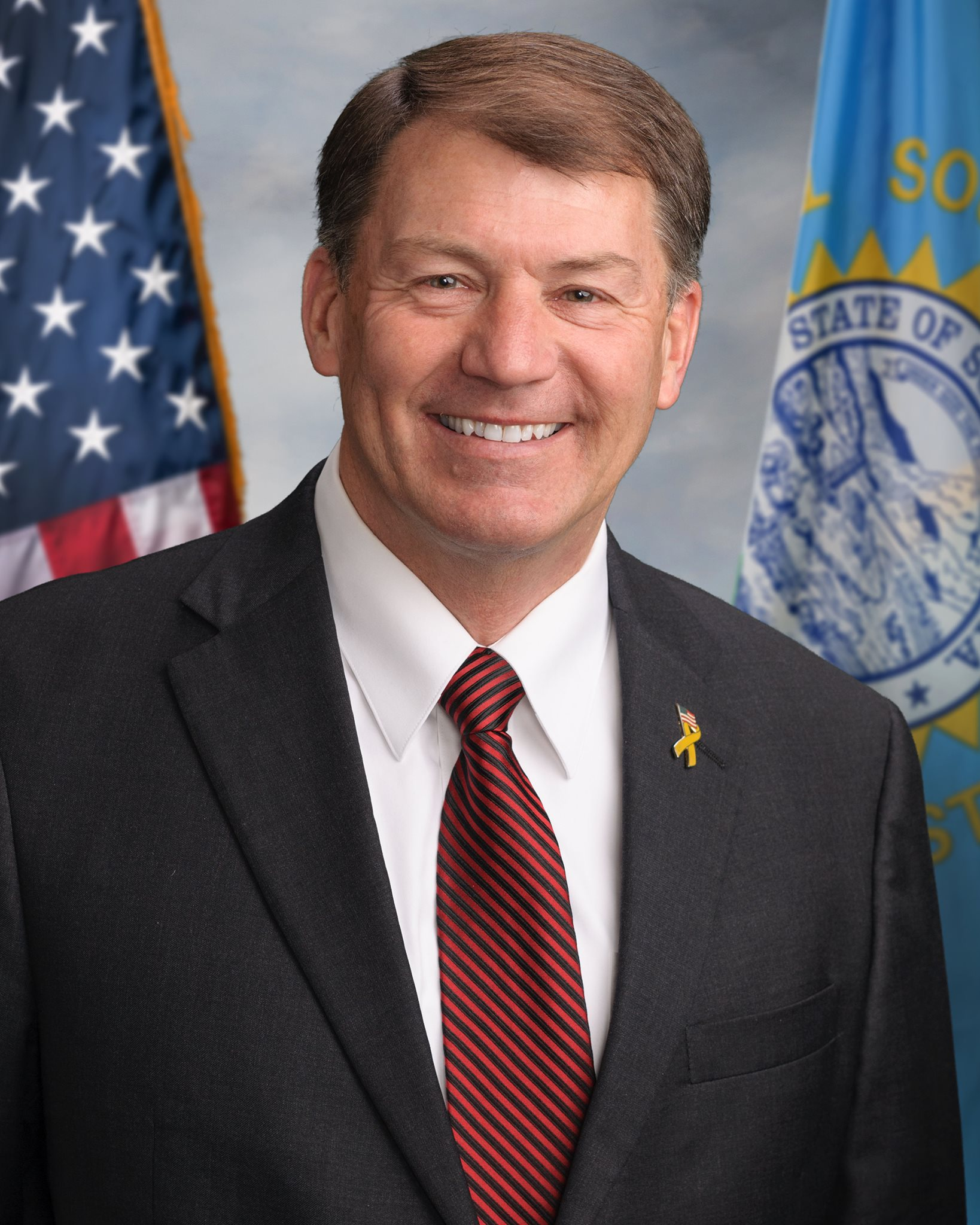
Mike Rounds

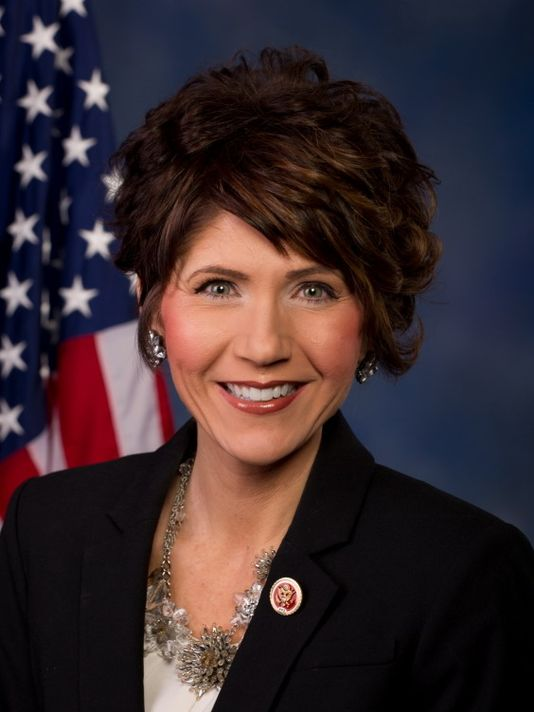
Kristi Noem

- Sigurd Anderson, 19th governor of South Dakota
- Andrew Wendell Bogue (1941), chief judge, United States District Court for the District of South Dakota
- Stephen Censky (1981), former United States deputy secretary of agriculture
- Pam Cole, former member of the South Dakota State Senate
- Tom Daschle (1969), majority leader of the United States Senate and U.S. representative from South Dakota
- Frank E. Denholm (1956), U.S. representative from South Dakota
- William Dougherty (1954), lieutenant governor of South Dakota
- Francis G. Dunn (1935), chief justice, South Dakota Supreme Court
- Kristie Fiegen (1984), chairwoman of South Dakota Public Utilities Commission
- Jason Frerichs (2007), current South Dakota Senate minority leader
- David Gilbertson (1972), current chief justice, South Dakota Supreme Court
- Philo Hall (1886), U.S. representative from South Dakota and 6th attorney general of South Dakota
- Carole Hillard (1982), lieutenant governor of South Dakota
- Kenneth B. Jones (1950s), former member of the South Dakota Senate
- Richard F. Kneip (1945), 6th U.S. ambassador to the Republic of Singapore and 25th governor of South Dakota
- Alan Lance (1971), 31st attorney general of Idaho, judge of the United States Court of Appeals for Veterans Claims, and national commander of the American Legion
- Larry Long (1969), 29th attorney general of South Dakota
- Gordon Mydland (1944), 23rd attorney general of South Dakota
- Kristi Noem (2011), 8th secretary of Homeland Security, former U.S. representative from South Dakota and first female governor of South Dakota
- Ben Reifel (1932), U.S. representative from South Dakota, first Indian member of Congress
- Mike Rounds (1976), current U.S. senator from South Dakota and 31st governor of South Dakota
- Mark Salter (1990), current associate justice of the South Dakota Supreme Court
- Kermit A. Sande (1964), 24th attorney general of South Dakota
- Randy Seiler, 41st United States attorney for the District of South Dakota
- Gregory J. Stoltenburg (1984), current presiding judge, Third Circuit Court of South Dakota
- Tony Venhuizen (2005), lieutenant governor of South Dakota

== Military ==
- Willibald C. Bianchi (1939), World War II veteran and Medal of Honor recipient
- Franklin J. Blaisdell (1971), U.S. Air Force general
- Raymond W. Carpenter (1970), U.S. major general of the United States Army, director of the Army National Guard
- Mark A. Clark (1980), U.S. major general of United States Marine Corps
- William E. DePuy (1941), U.S. Army general and first commander of TRADOC
- Jake Krull (1960), U.S. general and South Dakota state senator
- Gregory J. Stoltenburg (1984), U.S. lieutenant colonel
- Leo K. Thorsness (1953), U.S. Air Force colonel, Medal of Honor recipient, and Washington state senator

== Sports ==
- Mark Barber (1937), NFL fullback for Cleveland Rams
- Danny Batten (2010), NFL defensive end for Buffalo Bills
- Tom Black (1964), NBA center for Seattle SuperSonics
- Lynn Boden (1975), NFL guard for Detroit Lions and Chicago Bears
- Colin Cochart (2011), former NFL tight end for Cincinnati Bengals and Dallas Cowboys
- Rod DeHaven (1991), 2000 Olympic marathoner and 2000 U.S. Olympic trials champion
- Parker Douglass (2009), NFL placekicker for Cleveland Browns and New York Jets
- Doug Eggers (1955), NFL linebacker for Baltimore Colts and Chicago Cardinals
- Paul Ellering, manager of the Road Warriors Hawk and Animal; currently working in NXT managing The Authors of Pain
- Dallas Goedert (2018), NFL tight end for Philadelphia Eagles
- JaRon Harris (2009), NFL wide receiver for Green Bay Packers
- Steve Heiden (1999), NFL tight end for the Cleveland Browns, San Diego Chargers, and current NFL special teams coach of the Arizona Cardinals
- Jim Langer (1970), NFL center, Pro Football Hall of Fame inductee, and 2x Super Bowl Champion
- Steve Lingenfelter (1981), NBA forward for Washington Bullets and San Antonio Spurs
- Jon Madsen, NCAA Wrestling National Champion, current mixed martial artist
- David Michaud, professional mixed martial artist
- Doug Miller (1993), NFL linebacker for San Diego Chargers
- Paul Miller (1936), NFL halfback for the Green Bay Packers and 1x NFL Champion
- Dale Moss (2012), NFL wide receiver who last played for the Chicago Bears
- Josh Ranek (2002), CFL running back for the Edmonton Eskimos, Hamilton Tiger-Cats, and Ottawa Renegades
- Wayne Rasmussen (1964), NFL safety for the Detroit Lions
- Joel Reichow (2016), distance runner
- Pete Retzlaff (1956), NFL player, 5x Pro-bowler and president of the NFL Players Association
- Brad Seely (1978), former NFL special teams coach
- Adam Timmerman (1995), NFL guard for Green Bay Packers and St. Louis Rams, 2x Pro-Bowler, and 2x Super Bowl Champion
- Adam Vinatieri (1996), Pro Football Hall of Fame inductee, 4x Super Bowl Champion, and all-time NFL point scorer
- Jake Wieneke (2018), football wide receiver who last played for the Saskatchewan Roughriders
- Bryan Witzmann (2014), NFL offensive lineman for Kansas City Chiefs
- Nate Wolters (2013), basketball guard who last played for Panathinaikos B.C.
- Zach Zenner (2014), NFL running back for Detroit Lions
