= Fred Warren =

Fred Warren or Frederick Warren may refer to:

- Fred Warren (footballer, born 1907) (died 1986), a Welsh association footballer.
- Frederick Warren (1775–1848), Royal Navy vice-admiral
- Frederick Wilson Warren (1887–1959), Canadian architect and politician
- Frederick A. Warren (c. 1878–1944), South Dakota Supreme Court justice
- E. Alyn Warren (1874–1940), American actor sometimes known as "Fred Warren"
- Freddie Warren (footballer, born 1992), English footballer
