= De Grey =

De Grey may refer to:

Places

- De Grey, Western Australia
- De Grey, South Dakota

People

- de Grey (surname)
