= Lori S. Wilbur =

American judge

Justice of the South Dakota Supreme Court
- In office 2011–2017

Personal details
- Born: Madison, South Dakota, U.S.
- Education: University of South Dakota (BA, JD)

Lori S. Wilbur is a former Justice of the South Dakota Supreme Court.

She is a native of Madison, South Dakota. She graduated from the University of South Dakota with a B.A. in 1974, and graduated from the University of South Dakota School of Law in 1977. She did not take the bar exam but was admitted to the South Dakota bar under the state's diploma privilege. She became a magistrate judge for the Sixth Judicial Circuit in 1992, and a circuit court judge on the Sixth Judicial Circuit in 1999. She was appointed to the Supreme Court on August 16, 2011, by Governor Dennis Daugaard, and was retained by the voters in 2014 for a full eight-year term. She retired in June 2017.

Dennis Daugaard appointed Steven R. Jensen to succeed her on November 3, 2017.
