= Clear Lake, South Dakota =

Clear Lake, South Dakota mdéza
- City
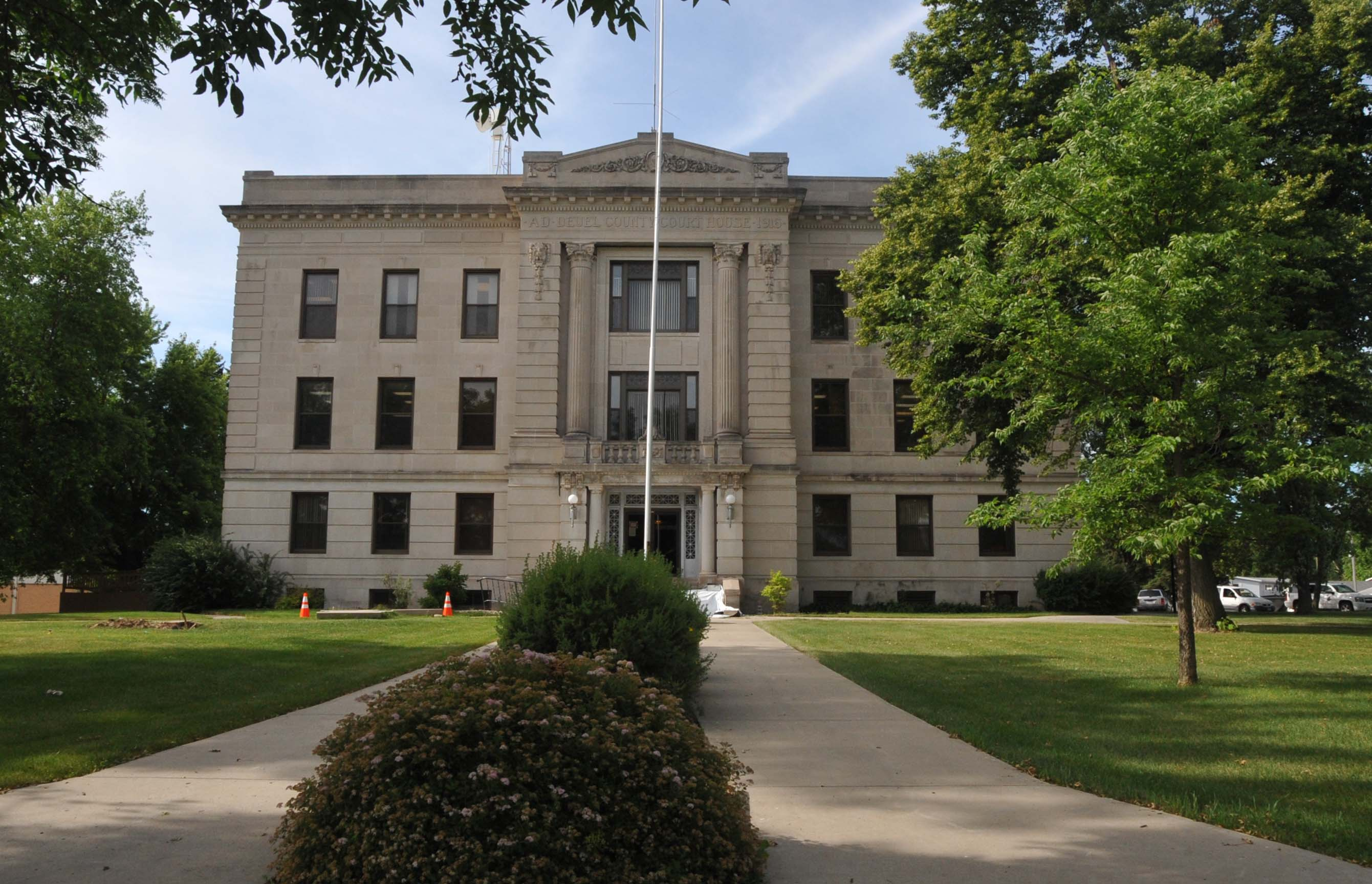
- Deuel County Courthouse in Clear Lake

- Location in Deuel County and the state of South Dakota
- Coordinates: 44°45′14″N 96°40′39″W
- Country: United States
- State: South Dakota
- County: Deuel
- Incorporated: 1900

Area
  - Total: 3.21 sq mi (8.31 km^{2})
  - Land: 3.03 sq mi (7.85 km^{2})
  - Water: 0.18 sq mi (0.46 km^{2})
- Elevation: 1,795 ft (547 m)

Population (2020)
  - Total: 1,218
  - Density: 402.0/sq mi (155.23/km^{2})
- Time zone: UTC−6 (Central (CST))
  - Summer (DST): UTC−5 (CDT)
- ZIP code: 57226
- Area code: 605
- FIPS code: 46-12540
- GNIS feature ID: 1267331
- Website: www.clearlakesd.com

Clear Lake (Dakota: mdéza; "Clear") is a city in and the county seat of Deuel County, South Dakota, United States. The population was 1,218 at the 2020 census.

== History ==
The city was named after the local Clear Lake.

== Geography ==
According to the United States Census Bureau, the city has a total area of 3.25 square miles (8.42 km^{2}), of which 3.07 square miles (7.95 km^{2}) is land and 0.18 square miles (0.47 km^{2}) is water.

=== Climate ===
Clear Lake has a dry-winter humid continental climate (Köppen Dwb).

Climate data for Clear Lake, South Dakota, 1991–2020 normals, 1903-2020 extremes: 1812ft (552m)
Month	Jan	Feb	Mar	Apr	May	Jun	Jul	Aug	Sep	Oct	Nov	Dec	Year
Record high °F (°C)	66 (19)	62 (17)	81 (27)	94 (34)	98 (37)	102 (39)	107 (42)	102 (39)	97 (36)	89 (32)	78 (26)	60 (16)	107 (42)
Mean maximum °F (°C)	41.5 (5.3)	47.7 (8.7)	62.5 (16.9)	78.0 (25.6)	86.1 (30.1)	89.8 (32.1)	91.6 (33.1)	90.0 (32.2)	86.1 (30.1)	79.3 (26.3)	62.4 (16.9)	45.0 (7.2)	91.8 (33.2)
Mean daily maximum °F (°C)	20.8 (−6.2)	25.5 (−3.6)	37.6 (3.1)	52.8 (11.6)	65.7 (18.7)	75.4 (24.1)	80.3 (26.8)	78.1 (25.6)	70.3 (21.3)	56.2 (13.4)	39.8 (4.3)	26.0 (−3.3)	52.4 (11.3)
Daily mean °F (°C)	11.6 (−11.3)	16.0 (−8.9)	27.9 (−2.3)	42.0 (5.6)	55.1 (12.8)	65.3 (18.5)	70.1 (21.2)	67.8 (19.9)	59.5 (15.3)	45.4 (7.4)	30.5 (−0.8)	17.4 (−8.1)	42.4 (5.8)
Mean daily minimum °F (°C)	2.4 (−16.4)	6.6 (−14.1)	18.2 (−7.7)	31.1 (−0.5)	44.4 (6.9)	55.2 (12.9)	59.9 (15.5)	57.5 (14.2)	48.7 (9.3)	34.5 (1.4)	21.2 (−6.0)	8.9 (−12.8)	32.4 (0.2)
Mean minimum °F (°C)	−18.4 (−28.0)	−14.4 (−25.8)	−5.1 (−20.6)	15.9 (−8.9)	30.3 (−0.9)	43.0 (6.1)	48.5 (9.2)	46.1 (7.8)	33.4 (0.8)	20.6 (−6.3)	2.3 (−16.5)	−13.1 (−25.1)	−21.6 (−29.8)
Record low °F (°C)	−37 (−38)	−33 (−36)	−22 (−30)	0 (−18)	17 (−8)	34 (1)	39 (4)	37 (3)	19 (−7)	9 (−13)	−18 (−28)	−30 (−34)	−37 (−38)
Average precipitation inches (mm)	0.72 (18)	0.80 (20)	1.55 (39)	2.49 (63)	3.42 (87)	4.46 (113)	3.27 (83)	3.37 (86)	3.01 (76)	2.35 (60)	1.13 (29)	0.91 (23)	27.48 (697)
Average snowfall inches (cm)	10.80 (27.4)	10.30 (26.2)	9.60 (24.4)	7.00 (17.8)	0.20 (0.51)	0.00 (0.00)	0.00 (0.00)	0.00 (0.00)	0.00 (0.00)	1.40 (3.6)	7.80 (19.8)	13.60 (34.5)	60.7 (154.21)
Average precipitation days (≥ 0.01 in)	6.9	6.2	7.1	9.4	12.2	12.1	9.1	9.6	8.9	8.0	6.0	6.5	102
Average snowy days (≥ 0.1 in)	6.5	5.5	4.4	2.1	0.0	0.0	0.0	0.0	0.0	0.8	3.6	5.9	28.8
Source 1: NOAA
Source 2: XMACIS2 (temp records & monthly max/mins)

== Demographics ==
Historical population
Census	Pop.	Note	%±
1890	147		—
1900	491		234.0%
1910	704		43.4%
1920	835		18.6%
1930	834		−0.1%
1940	997		19.5%
1950	1,105		10.8%
1960	1,137		2.9%
1970	1,157		1.8%
1980	1,310		13.2%
1990	1,247		−4.8%
2000	1,335		7.1%
2010	1,273		−4.6%
2020	1,218		−4.3%
U.S. Decennial Census; 2018 Estimate

=== 2020 census ===
As of the 2020 census, Clear Lake had a population of 1,218. The median age was 44.5 years. 22.9% of residents were under the age of 18 and 24.5% of residents were 65 years of age or older. For every 100 females there were 92.4 males, and for every 100 females age 18 and over there were 89.3 males age 18 and over.

0.0% of residents lived in urban areas, while 100.0% lived in rural areas.

There were 522 households in Clear Lake, of which 24.5% had children under the age of 18 living in them. Of all households, 48.5% were married-couple households, 18.4% were households with a male householder and no spouse or partner present, and 25.3% were households with a female householder and no spouse or partner present. About 35.8% of all households were made up of individuals and 18.4% had someone living alone who was 65 years of age or older.

There were 588 housing units, of which 11.2% were vacant. The homeowner vacancy rate was 4.2% and the rental vacancy rate was 12.8%.

Racial composition as of the 2020 census
Race	Number	Percent
White	1,169	96.0%
Black or African American	5	0.4%
American Indian and Alaska Native	19	1.6%
Asian	0	0.0%
Native Hawaiian and Other Pacific Islander	3	0.2%
Some other race	5	0.4%
Two or more races	17	1.4%
Hispanic or Latino (of any race)	17	1.4%

=== 2010 census ===
As of the census of 2010, there were 1,273 people, 552 households, and 338 families living in the city. The population density was 414.7 inhabitants per square mile (160.1/km^{2}). There were 617 housing units at an average density of 201.0 per square mile (77.6/km^{2}). The racial makeup of the city was 97.6% White, 0.4% African American, 0.1% Asian, 0.4% from other races, and 1.5% from two or more races. Hispanic or Latino of any race were 1.0% of the population.

There were 552 households, of which 27.4% had children under the age of 18 living with them, 49.5% were married couples living together, 8.2% had a female householder with no husband present, 3.6% had a male householder with no wife present, and 38.8% were non-families. 35.7% of all households were made up of individuals, and 18.5% had someone living alone who was 65 years of age or older. The average household size was 2.22 and the average family size was 2.85.

The median age in the city was 44.3 years. 21.7% of residents were under the age of 18; 7% were between the ages of 18 and 24; 22.3% were from 25 to 44; 25% were from 45 to 64; and 23.9% were 65 years of age or older. The gender makeup of the city was 48.8% male and 51.2% female.

=== 2000 census ===
As of the census of 2000, there were 1,335 people, 565 households, and 354 families living in the city. The population density was 441.4 inhabitants per square mile (170.4/km^{2}). There were 607 housing units at an average density of 200.7 per square mile (77.5/km^{2}). The racial makeup of the city was 99.03% White, 0.15% Native American, 0.30% Asian, and 0.52% from two or more races. Hispanic or Latino of any race were 0.15% of the population.

There were 565 households, out of which 27.4% had children under the age of 18 living with them, 54.3% were married couples living together, 6.7% had a female householder with no husband present, and 37.2% were non-families. 33.8% of all households were made up of individuals, and 18.4% had someone living alone who was 65 years of age or older. The average household size was 2.24 and the average family size was 2.86.

In the city, the population was spread out, with 23.4% under the age of 18, 6.9% from 18 to 24, 23.1% from 25 to 44, 19.7% from 45 to 64, and 26.9% who were 65 years of age or older. The median age was 42 years. For every 100 females, there were 88.0 males. For every 100 females age 18 and over, there were 82.4 males.

As of 2000 the median income for a household in the city was $31,522 and the median income for a family was $40,859. Males had a median income of $27,250 versus $19,236 for females. The per capita income for the city was $15,755. About 3.4% of families and 9.2% of the population were below the poverty line, including 3.7% of those under age 18 and 21.7% of those age 65 or over.

== Community activities ==
Clear Lake is host to one of the largest rodeos in the area. The Crystal Springs Ranch Rodeo is held the end of June each year, drawing thousands of people to the town. It is held in the nation's most natural rodeo bowl in the Coteau Hills, a native grassland prairie formed by glaciers. During the rodeo, visitors and residents alike enjoy camping, community garage and yard sales, and a parade.

== Notable people ==
- Gregory J. Stoltenburg, presiding judge of Third Judicial Circuit of South Dakota.
- Marvin Heemeyer, also known as Killdozer, a man who went on a destruction rampage using a modified bulldozer in Granby, Colorado, where he owned a muffler shop.

== See also ==
- List of cities in South Dakota
