= Justice Warren (disambiguation) =

Justice Warren may refer to:

- Earl Warren (1891–1974), chief justice of the United States
- Frederick A. Warren (1907–1995), associate justice of the South Dakota Supreme Court
- Henry L. Warren (1837–1900), associate justice of the Territorial Montana Supreme Court

== See also ==
- Warren E. Burger (1907–1995), chief justice of the United States
