= Fred J. Homeyer =

American judge (c. 1914–1990)

Fred J. Homeyer (1913 – March 26, 1990) was a justice of the South Dakota Supreme Court from December 1, 1962 to 1971.

Born in South Dakota, Homeyer received his law degree from the University of South Dakota School of Law, magna cum laude, in 1935.

He entered the practice in Selby, South Dakota, and "entered the armed services nine years later". He served in the United States Army in World War II.

He was associated with George T. Mickelson in law practice in Selby until 1947, when Mickelson was elected governor". In 1962, Governor Archie M. Gubbrud appointed Homeyer to a seat on the state supreme court. In January 1970, Homeyer announced that he would not seek reelection to the seat that year, saying that he intended to return to private life.

Political offices
Preceded by St. Clair Smith	Justice of the South Dakota Supreme Court; 1962–1971	Succeeded by Roger Leland Wollman
