= Robert Gusinsky =

American judge

Associate Justice of the South Dakota Supreme Court
- Incumbent
- Assumed office December 8, 2025
- Appointed by: Larry Rhoden
- Preceded by: Janine M. Kern

Personal details
- Born: Latvian SSR, Soviet Union (now Latvia)
- Education: Embry-Riddle Aeronautical University (BS); University of South Dakota (JD)

Robert Gusinsky is an associate justice of the South Dakota Supreme Court.

== Early life and education ==
Gusinsky was born in the Latvian Soviet Socialist Republic of the Soviet Union. He migrated with his family to Israel and Germany before settling in California in 1978 at age 13, eventually becoming naturalized as a United States citizen.

Gusinsky graduated from Embry Riddle Aeronautical University in 1990 with a Bachelor of Science in aeronautical engineering and worked as a commercial airline pilot and flight instructor for three years. He then entered the University of South Dakota School of Law, earning his Juris Doctor in 1996.

== Career ==
After graduation from law school, Gusinsky began practicing law at various Rapid City firms. In 2007 he joined the United States attorney's office. South Dakota governor Dennis Daugaard appointed him to serve on the Seventh Judicial Circuit Court in 2013, where he served until being appointed to the South Dakota Supreme Court by Governor Larry Rhoden in 2025. His appointment to the supreme court filled a vacancy created by the retirement of Justice Janine M. Kern. Gusinsky was sworn into office on December 8, 2025.

Legal offices
Preceded by Janine M. Kern	Associate Justice of the South Dakota Supreme Court; 2025–present	Incumbent
