= Senator Sherwood =

Senator Sherwood may refer to:

- Andrew Sherwood (politician) (born 1980), Arizona State Senate
- Carl G. Sherwood (1855–1938), South Dakota State Senate
- Franklin D. Sherwood (1841–1907), New York State Senate
- Lyman Sherwood (1802–1865), New York State Senate
