= Gregory J. Stoltenburg =

American judge

Presiding Judge of the Third Judicial Circuit of South Dakota
- Incumbent
- Assumed office January 1, 2013
- Preceded by: David Gienapp

States Attorney of Deuel County
- In office 2002–2012

Personal details
- Born: 1964 (age 61–62) Clear Lake, South Dakota, U.S.
- Education: South Dakota State University (BS); University of South Dakota (JD)

Military service
- Allegiance: United States
- Branch/service: United States Army
- Years of service: 1981-2017
- Rank: Lieutenant Colonel
- Unit: J.A.G. Corps
- Battles/wars: Gulf War

Gregory J. Stoltenburg (born 1964) is an American lawyer, veteran, and current presiding judge of the Third Judicial Circuit in South Dakota.

== Early life and education ==
Born in Clear Lake, South Dakota, Stoltenburg earned a bachelor's degree in Agricultural Business and Commercial Economics from South Dakota State University in May 1986. In 1981, he joined the South Dakota Army National Guard (SDARNG) and served on active duty in Saudi Arabia during Operation Desert Storm in 1991. He also volunteered for service following Hurricane Katrina in 2005. Stoltenburg attended the University of South Dakota School of Law, graduating with Sterling honors in 1995.

== Career ==
Following graduation, he worked as a judicial law clerk for Justice John K. Konenkamp of the South Dakota Supreme Court before returning to his hometown of Clear Lake in 1996 to practice law. Stoltenburg continued his military service in the U.S. Army JAG Corps in 1996 and subsequently attended The JAG School at the University of Virginia.

In addition to his private practice, Stoltenburg was Deuel County Deputy States Attorney from 1996 to 2000 and as the Deuel County States Attorney from 2000 to 2012. Stoltenburg eventually rose to become the Deputy Staff Judge Advocate for the South Dakota Army National Guard. He retired from the JAG Corps with the rank of Lieutenant Colonel in 2017.

== State judicial service ==
He was appointed by Governor Dennis Daugaard in October 2012 to replace David Gienapp. Stoltenburg took office after Gienapp's retirement on January 1, 2013. He was re-elected in 2014 for a term that expires in 2022. In April 2015, Stoltenburg was appointed presiding judge of the Third Circuit by Chief Justice David Gilbertson.

After being appointed to the circuit bench, Stoltenburg has sat on the South Dakota Supreme Court bench lieu Justice John K. Konenkamp, whom he had clerked for, on a number of cases.

== Personal life ==
Stoltenburg is a member of St. Mary's Catholic Church in Clear Lake and is involved in many community organizations and events. He and his wife, Lynn, have five children.
