= Oren P. Coler =

American judge (1925–1978)

Oren Phil Coler (June 20, 1925 – December 4, 1978) was a justice of the South Dakota Supreme Court from 1974 to 1977.

== Biography ==
Born in De Grey, South Dakota, Coler served in the United States Navy during World War II, and graduated from the University of South Dakota School of Law in 1952.

Coler then entered the practice of law in Chamberlain, South Dakota, and "served as Supreme Court reporter and revisor of statutes before becoming code counsel for the Legislative Research Council".

On August 29, 1974, Governor Richard F. Kneip announced the appointment of Coler to a seat on the state supreme court being vacated by the retirement of Justice Frank Biegelmeier. Coler remained on the court until 1977, when he was appointed revenue secretary of South Dakota.

== Personal life ==
On August 29, 1947, Coler married Marge Koehler in Chamberlain, South Dakota, with whom he had a son and two daughters.

Political offices
Preceded by Frank Biegelmeier	Justice of the South Dakota Supreme Court; 1974–1977	Succeeded by Robert E. Morgan
