= Jon Fosheim =

American judge (1923–2004)

Jon Fosheim (January 25, 1923 – October 12, 2004) was a justice of the South Dakota Supreme Court from 1978 to December 12, 1986, serving as chief justice for the final three years of his tenure.

== Early life, education, and career ==
Born in Howard, South Dakota, Fosheim attended the public schools of that city and served in the United States Army during World War II, from 1942 to 1943. He received his law degree from the University of South Dakota School of Law in 1946. He then entered the practice of law in Huron, South Dakota, and "served four years as state's attorney of Beadle County and two years as deputy state's attorney".

== Judicial service ==
In September 1959, Governor Ralph Herseth appointed Fosheim as a circuit judge in the 9th Judicial Circuit of South Dakota. Fosheim was "re-elected to that office four consecutive times", becoming presiding judge of the 3rd Judicial Circuit of South Dakota. In the early 1970s, he served on the state's Constitutional Revision Commission, "which recommended extensive changes to the executive and judicial articles of the South Dakota Constitution that were adopted by voters in 1972".

In April 1978, Fosheim filed to run for a seat on the state supreme court. Fosheim was elected to the state supreme court in November 1978, defeating incumbent Donald J. Porter by 45 votes out of over 49,000 votes cast. Fosheim became chief justice in 1983, and announced in January 1986 that he would retire from the court later that year.

== Personal life and death ==
On December 28, 1948, Fosheim married Mary Lou Olson of Huron, with whom he had three sons and two daughters. Mary Lou died in 1994. Fosheim died ten years later, in a hospital in Sioux Falls, South Dakota, at the age of 81.

Political offices
Preceded by Donald J. Porter	Justice of the South Dakota Supreme Court; 1978–1986	Succeeded by Robert A. Miller
