= Charles B. Kornmann =

American judge (born 1937)

Senior Judge of the United States District Court for the District of South Dakota
- Incumbent
- Assumed office July 31, 2008

Judge of the United States District Court for the District of South Dakota
- In office March 24, 1995 – July 31, 2008
- Appointed by: Bill Clinton
- Preceded by: John Bailey Jones
- Succeeded by: Roberto Lange

Personal details
- Born: September 14, 1937 (age 89) Watertown, South Dakota, U.S.
- Party: Democratic
- Education: College of St. Thomas (BA); Georgetown University (LLB)

Charles Bruno Kornmann (born September 14, 1937) is a senior United States district judge of the United States District Court for the District of South Dakota.

== Early life, education, and career ==
Born in Watertown, South Dakota, Kornmann graduated from Castlewood High School in Castlewood, South Dakota. Kornmann then received a Bachelor of Arts degree from College of St. Thomas in 1959 and a Bachelor of Laws from Georgetown University Law Center in 1962.

He was in the South Dakota National Guard from 1963 to 1972 and the United States Army from 1968 to 1972. He became a captain. He was a Legislative assistant to U.S. Senator George McGovern in 1963. Kornmann was an Executive secretary of South Dakota Democratic Party from 1963 to 1965.

He was in private practice in Aberdeen, South Dakota from 1965 to 1995, also working as an assistant city attorney for the City of Aberdeen from 1970 to 1986.

== Federal judicial service ==
On January 23, 1995, Kornmann was nominated by President Bill Clinton to a seat on the United States District Court for the District of South Dakota vacated by John Bailey Jones. On March 24, 1995, Kornmann was confirmed by the United States Senate. On May 7, 1995, he took the oath of office and began his position.

== Sources ==
Legal offices
Preceded by John Bailey Jones	Judge of the United States District Court for the District of South Dakota; 1995–2008	Succeeded by Roberto Lange
