= Frank Biegelmeier =

American judge (1901–1988)

Justice of the South Dakota Supreme Court
- In office 1959–1974

Chief Justice of the South Dakota Supreme Court
- In office 1973–1974

Personal details
- Born: September 9, 1901 Yankton, South Dakota, U.S.
- Died: March 27, 1988 (aged 86) Yankton, South Dakota, U.S.
- Spouse: Maude McKenna (m. 1929)
- Children: 3
- Education: University of South Dakota School of Law

Frank Biegelmeier (September 9, 1901 – March 27, 1988) was an American lawyer and judge who served as a justice of the South Dakota Supreme Court from May 11, 1959, until his retirement on August 31, 1974, serving as chief justice for the last two years of his tenure.

== Early life, education, and career ==
Born in Yankton, South Dakota, Biegelmeier attended Yankton High School and received an LL.B. from the University of South Dakota School of Law in 1927. He began his career in private legal practice in Yankton before serving as both a city attorney and a state's attorney.

== Judicial service and later life ==
In 1959, Biegelmeier was appointed as a justice of the South Dakota Supreme Court, representing the 4th District. He assumed the newly established role of Chief Justice in 1973, following a state constitutional overhaul creating a Unified Judicial System. He served in that capacity until his retirement in 1974. After retiring, he traveled, lectured, and remained active in civic organizations.

In 1987, he was a party to the case of Johnson v. Biegelmeier, which reached the South Dakota Supreme Court, where Biegelmeier's claim of adverse possession over a plot of 2.43 acres was affirmed.

== Personal life and death ==
In 1929, he married Maude Frances McKenna of Tyndall, South Dakota, with whom he had three daughters.

He was active in the Boy Scouts of America, receiving the Silver Beaver Award, and participated in the Order of the Arrow and the Red Cross swimming and lifesaving programs.

Biegelmeier died in Yankton at the age of 86, and was buried in Yankton Cemetery.

Political offices
Preceded by Harold Bogue	Justice of the South Dakota Supreme Court; 1959–1974	Succeeded by Oren P. Coler
