= Bar examination in the United States =

Exam to become a lawyer

In the United States, aspiring lawyers must normally pass a bar examination before they can be admitted to the bar and become licensed to practice law. Bar exams are administered by states or territories, usually by agencies under the authority of state supreme courts. (Note: Sometimes the agency is an office or committee of the state's highest court or intermediate appellate court. In some states which have a unified or integrated bar association (meaning that formal membership in a public corporation controlled by the judiciary is required to practice law therein), the agency is either the state bar association or a subunit thereof. Other states split the integrated bar membership and the admissions agency into different bodies within the judiciary; in Texas, the Board of Law Examiners is appointed by the Texas Supreme Court and is independent from the integrated State Bar of Texas.) Almost all states use some examination components created by the National Conference of Bar Examiners (NCBE). Forty-one jurisdictions have adopted the Uniform Bar Examination (UBE), which is composed entirely of NCBE-created components.

In every U.S. jurisdiction except Wisconsin, Oregon, and Washington, all those seeking admission to the bar must pass a bar examination. In Wisconsin, graduates of the Juris Doctor degree programs of the state's two American Bar Association-accredited law schools—the University of Wisconsin Law School and Marquette University Law School—may be admitted to the Wisconsin bar by diploma privilege without taking a bar examination. Oregon permits students who have completed a Juris Doctor program with certain required coursework to obtain bar admission through a Supervised Practice Portfolio Examination. In Washington, the State Supreme Court in March 2024 approved "in concept" alternative pathways based on apprenticeship or work experience.

== History ==
The first bar examination in what is now the United States was administered in oral form in the Delaware Colony in 1783. From the late 18th to the late 19th centuries, bar examinations were generally oral and administered after a period of study under a lawyer or judge (a practice called "reading the law"). The trend in the 19th century was toward more casual examinations and options for exemptions.

After the emergence of law schools in the 1870s onward, bar examinations became even less common as many states offered diploma privilege to local law school graduates. Between 1890 and 1920, most states replaced oral examinations with written bar examinations. Written examinations became commonplace as lawyers began to practice in states other than those where they were trained.

In 1921, the American Bar Association formally expressed a preference for required written bar examinations in place of diploma privilege for law school graduates. In subsequent decades, the prevalence of diploma privilege declined deeply, and bar examinations became a standard requirement of admission to the bar. By 1980, all but five states required written bar examinations; as of 2020, only Wisconsin allows J.D. graduates of accredited law schools to seek admission to the state bar without passing a bar examination.

== Content of the bar examination ==
The bar examination is generally administered over two days (in some cases, three days). In most jurisdictions, it is administered twice a year, in February and July. Bar examinations in all but two jurisdictions in the United States use some examination component created by the National Conference of Bar Examiners (NCBE).

=== Components created by the National Conference of Bar Examiners (NCBE) ===
==== Multistate Bar Examination (MBE) ====
The MBE is a standardized test consisting of 200 multiple-choice questions covering seven key areas of law: constitutional law, contracts, criminal law and procedure, federal rules of civil procedure, federal rules of evidence, real property, and torts. The MBE formerly addressed only six topics, with civil procedure added by the NCBE in 2009 and administered starting in 2015. Examinees have three hours to answer 100 questions in a morning session and the same for an afternoon session. The MBE is administered in all U.S. states and territories, except Louisiana and Puerto Rico, which follow civil law systems very different from the legal systems in other states, and California, which in 2024 replaced the MBE with a test generated with the help of artificial intelligence to cut costs. The MBE is administered in most jurisdictions on the last Wednesday in February and July.

Of the 200 questions, 175 are scored and 25 are questions under evaluation for future use. The NCBE grades the MBE using a scaled score ranging from 40 to 200. Taking the MBE in one jurisdiction may allow an applicant to use his or her MBE score to waive into another jurisdiction or to use the MBE score with another state's bar examination. NCBE provides free example MBE questions for civil procedure with explanatory answers along with further free example questions and answer explanations.

==== Multistate Essay Examination (MEE) ====
The MEE consists of six 30-minute essay questions that examines a candidate's ability to analyze legal issues and communicate them effectively in writing. In addition to the topics examined in the MBE, the MEE also covers Agency law, Corporations law, and Partnerships law. The MEE is administered on the last Tuesday in February and July, the day before the MBE.

The NCBE drafts six MEE questions for each exam. The questions are drafted by the NCBE Drafting Committee, with the assistance of outside academics and practitioners who are experts in the fields being tested, and then reviewed by outside experts and state boards of bar examiners. Unlike the MBE, which is graded and scored by the NCBE, the MEE is graded exclusively by the jurisdiction that administers the bar examination. Each jurisdiction has the choice of grading MEE questions according to general U.S. common law or the jurisdiction's own law.

==== Multistate Performance Test (MPT) ====
The MPT is a "closed-universe" test in which each candidate is required to perform a standard lawyering task, such as a memo or brief. The candidate is provided with a case file and a "library" which contains all of the substantive law required to perform the task (plus some non-relevant material). The MPT is administered on the last Tuesday in February and July, the same day as the MEE. The NCBE provides two MPT questions. The MPT is usually situated in the fictional state of Franklin.

=== Components created by states and territories ===
California and Pennsylvania draft and administer their own performance tests.

California began administering three-hour-long performance tests in 1983, based on the results of a July 1980 experiment. California performance tests are far more difficult than the MPT. Starting with the July 2017 bar examination, California switched to a 90-minute format but continues to prepare its own performance tests, which are usually situated in the fictional state of Columbia.

Essay questions are the most variable component of the bar exam. States emphasize different areas of law in their essay questions depending upon their respective histories and public policy priorities. For example, unlike Texas and California, Louisiana did not convert to the common law when it was acquired by the United States, so its essay questions require knowledge of the state's unique civil law system. Several states whose family law was influenced by Spanish and Mexican civil law, like California and Texas, require all bar exam applicants to demonstrate knowledge of community property law. Pennsylvania, with a history of federal tax evasion (e.g., the Whiskey Rebellion), tests federal income tax law, while New Jersey, with a history of discriminatory zoning (resulting in the controversial Mount Laurel doctrine), tests zoning and planning law. New Mexico, South Dakota, and Washington each test Indian law, because of their relatively large populations of Native Americans and large numbers of Indian reservations. Most states test knowledge of the law of negotiable instruments and secured transactions (Articles 3 and 9 of the Uniform Commercial Code), but Alaska, California, Minnesota, and Pennsylvania do not; they have recognized that the vast majority of criminal, personal injury, and family lawyers will never draft a promissory note or litigate the validity of a security interest.

=== Uniform Bar Examination (UBE) ===
The Uniform Bar Examination (UBE) is a standardized bar examination in the United States developed by the NCBE. It consists solely of the MBE, MEE, and MPT, and offers portability of scores across state lines. According to the NCBE, the UBE is intended to "test knowledge and skills that every lawyer should be able to demonstrate prior to becoming licensed to practice law", and "is uniformly administered, graded, and scored by user jurisdictions and results in a portable score." UBE jurisdictions are allowed to additionally test candidates' knowledge of state-specific law, through either a test or course.

The UBE was created in 2011, and was first administered that year by Missouri and North Dakota. It has since been adopted by 41 United States jurisdictions (out of a possible 56). The American Bar Association also endorsed the UBE at its 2016 mid-year meeting. However, some of the largest legal markets—including California and Florida—have not adopted the UBE. Concerns include the lack of questions on state law, and that the test provides NCBE with control over the bar credentialing process. In addition, the largest UBE market (New York), indicated that it may withdraw from the UBE, after a task force commissioned by the New York State Bar found in 2020 that "since the adoption of the UBE, the fundamental purpose of the bar examination, which is to protect the public, has been lost."

A number of jurisdictions are considering or have considered adoption of the UBE:

- In 2014, The Florida Bar formed a Uniform Bar Examination Committee.
- In 2016, the Virginia Board of Bar Examiners considered the UBE, but stated that "it is not in the best interests of the public of Virginia or the Virginia judicial system."
- In May 2020, Nevada indicated that it will not adopt the UBE anytime in the near future. In Nevada, the UBE is supported by the dean of the William S. Boyd School of Law but opposed by the chair of the state Board of Bar Examiners.

=== NextGen UBE ===
The NCBE is developing a new test format for the Uniform Bar Examination called the NextGen UBE. It has debuted in 10 jurisdictions in July 2026 and is set to debut in another 13 in July 2027. Its tests will be administered in three three-hour sections over the course of a day and a half.

== Preparation for the bar examination ==
Most law schools teach students common law and how to analyze hypothetical fact patterns like a lawyer, but do not specifically prepare law students for any particular bar exam. Only a minority of law schools offer bar preparation courses.

To refresh their memory on "black-letter rules" tested on the bar, most students engage in a regimen of study (called "bar review") between graduating from law school and sitting for the bar. For bar review, most students in the United States attend a private bar review course which is provided by a third-party company and not their law school.

== Overview of bar examination by jurisdiction ==
Overview of bar examination components by U.S. jurisdiction
Jurisdiction	UBE	MBE	MEE	MPT	Locally administered exam components
Alabama	✔	✔	✔	✔	
Alaska	✔	✔	✔	✔	
Arizona	✔	✔	✔	✔	
Arkansas	✔	✔	✔	✔	
California					219 multiple-choice questions, including 48 drawn from the First-Year Law Students' Examination, plus 23 scored questions developed using artificial intelligence
Colorado	✔	✔	✔	✔	
Connecticut	✔	✔	✔	✔	
Delaware		✔		✔	8 essay questions
District of Columbia	✔	✔	✔	✔	
Florida		✔			3 essay questions, 100 multiple-choice questions
Georgia		✔		✔	4 essay questions
Guam		✔	✔	✔	1 essay question
Hawaii		✔	✔	✔	15 multiple-choice questions
Idaho	✔	✔	✔	✔	
Illinois	✔	✔	✔	✔	
Indiana	✔	✔	✔	✔	
Iowa	✔	✔	✔	✔	
Kansas	✔	✔	✔	✔	
Kentucky	✔	✔	✔	✔	
Louisiana					9 locally developed sections
Maine	✔	✔	✔	✔	
Maryland	✔	✔	✔	✔	
Massachusetts	✔	✔	✔	✔	
Michigan	(Starting February 2023)	✔	✔	✔	
Minnesota	✔	✔	✔	✔	
Mississippi		✔	6 essay questions		
Missouri	✔	✔			
Montana	✔	✔			
Nebraska	✔	✔			
Nevada		✔		8 essay questions	
New Hampshire	✔	✔	✔		
New Jersey	✔	✔	✔		
New Mexico	✔	✔	✔		
New York	✔	✔	✔	New York Law Exam	
North Carolina	✔	✔	✔		
North Dakota	✔	✔	✔		
Northern Mariana Islands		✔	✔	2 essay questions	
Ohio	✔	✔	✔	✔	✔
Oklahoma	✔	✔		✔	✔
Oregon	✔	✔	✔	✔	✔
Pennsylvania	✔	✔	✔	✔	✔
Puerto Rico					8 essay questions, 184 multiple-choice questions
Rhode Island	✔	✔	✔	✔	
South Carolina	✔	✔	✔	✔	
South Dakota		✔	✔	✔	1 Indian law question
Tennessee	✔	✔	✔	✔	
Texas	✔	✔	✔	✔	
Utah	✔	✔	✔	✔	
Vermont	✔	✔	✔	✔	
Virgin Islands	✔	✔	✔	✔	
Virginia		✔			9 essay questions, 10 multiple-choice questions
Washington	✔	✔	✔	✔	
West Virginia	✔	✔	✔	✔	
Wisconsin		✔	✔	✔	Combination of MEE, MPT, and locally drafted essay questions
Wyoming	✔	✔	✔	✔	

=== Details of UBE by jurisdiction ===
Transfer scores and eligibility, adoption dates, and additional requirements for jurisdictions that have adopted the UBE
State or territory	In-state score	Transfer score	First UBE administration	Additional exam or course	UBE transfer eligibility
Alabama	260	260	July 2011	Yes	25 months
Alaska	270	270	July 2014	No	60 months
Arizona	270	273	July 2012	Yes	60 months
Arkansas	270	270	February 2020	No	36 months
Colorado	270	276	February 2012	No	36 months (Note: 3 years + 2 years active practice immediately preceding)
Connecticut	266	266	February 2017	No	36 months
District of Columbia	266	266	July 2016	No	60 months
Idaho	270	280	February 2012	No	37 months
Illinois	266	266	July 2019	No	48 months
Indiana	264	264	July 2021	No	60 months
Iowa	266	266	February 2016	No	60 months (Note: with proof upon filing of regular practice 2 of 3 years immediately preceding)
Kansas	266	266	February 2016	No	36 months
Kentucky	266	266	February 2021	No	60 months
Maine	270	276	July 2017	No	36 months
Maryland	266	266	July 2019	Yes	36 months
Massachusetts	270	270	July 2018	Yes	36 months
Michigan	268	268	February 2023	No	TBD
Minnesota	260	260	February 2014	No	36
Missouri	260	260	February 2011	Yes	24 months
Montana	266	266	July 2013	Yes	36 months
Nebraska	270	270	February 2012	No	36 months
New Hampshire	270	270	February 2014	No	36 months (Note: if older than 3 years, applicant must show practice for prior 2 years and was in good standing for the whole duration)
New Jersey	266	266	February 2017	No	36 months
New Mexico	260	260	February 2016	Yes	36 months
New York	266	266	July 2016	Yes	36 months
North Carolina	270	270	February 2019	Yes	36 months
North Dakota	260	260	February 2011	No	24 months
Ohio	270	270	July 2020	No	60 months
Oklahoma	264	264	July 2021	No	36 months
Oregon	270	274	July 2017	No	36 months
Pennsylvania	270	270	July 2022	No	30 months
Rhode Island	270	270	February 2019	Yes	24 months
South Carolina	266	266	February 2017	Yes	36 months
Tennessee	270	270	February 2019	No	36 months
Texas	270	270	February 2021	Yes	24/60
Utah	270	270	February 2013	No	24/60 (Note: for attorneys of other jurisdictions with proof of full-time law practice for at least half of the time since passing the exam) months
Vermont	270	270	July 2016	No	36 months (Note: if engaged in the practice of law for 2 years and in good standing)
Washington	270	270	July 2013	Yes	40 months
West Virginia	270	270	July 2017	No	36 months
Wyoming	270	270	July 2013	No	36 months
U.S. Virgin Islands	266	266	July 2017	Yes	36 months

== Criticism ==
=== Arguments against bar exams ===
A statement by the Society of American Law Teachers (SALT) articulates many criticisms of the bar exam. The SALT statement, however, does propose some alternative methods of bar admission that are partially test-based. A response to the SALT statement was made by Suzanne Darrow-Kleinhaus in The Bar Examiner.

=== Arguments for alternatives to the bar exam ===
The NCBE published an article in 2005 addressing alternatives to the bar exam, including a discussion of the Daniel Webster Scholar Honors Program, an alternate certification program introduced at the University of New Hampshire School of Law (formerly Franklin Pierce Law Center) in that year.

== See also ==
- Multistate Professional Responsibility Examination – Separate examination often required of attorneys
