= Frank Anderson (judge) =

American judge (1870–1931)

Frank Anderson (October 18, 1870 – March 16, 1931) was a justice of the South Dakota Supreme Court from December 1, 1921 to 1925.

Born in Minnesota, Anderson was a state attorney in Webster, South Dakota, for several years, later becoming a state circuit court judge for three years before being appointed to the state supreme court in 1921, by Governor William H. McMaster. He retired due to poor health, and moved to Davenport, Iowa, several years thereafter.

On November 8, 1899, Anderson married Sophie Knudson in Davis, Illinois. He died in his home in Davenport at the age of 60.

Political offices
Preceded by James H. McCoy	Justice of the South Dakota Supreme Court; 1921–1925	Succeeded by Dwight Campbell
