= Scott P. Myren =

American judge (born 1964)

Scott Myren

Associate Justice of the South Dakota Supreme Court
- Incumbent
- Assumed office January 5, 2021
- Appointed by: Kristi Noem
- Preceded by: David Gilbertson

Personal details
- Born: Scott Palmer Myren; September 22, 1964 (age 60); Mobridge, South Dakota, U.S.
- Education: University of South Dakota (BS); Rutgers University, Camden (JD)

Scott Palmer Myren (born September 22, 1964) is an Associate Justice of the South Dakota Supreme Court.

== Education ==
Myren earned his Bachelor of Science from the University of South Dakota in 1985 and he earned his Juris Doctor from the Rutgers Law School in 1988.

== Legal career ==
After graduation from law school, Myren began practicing law in Denver, Colorado. In 1990, he returned to South Dakota to serve as the South Dakota Supreme Court's permanent staff attorney.

== Judicial career ==
=== State judicial career ===
Myren began his judicial career as an administrative law judge after being appointed by Governor Walter Dale Miller. From 1999 to 2004 Myren served as a Magistrate Judge for the Sixth Judicial Circuit. In 2004, he was appointed as a Circuit Judge for the Fifth Judicial Circuit by Governor Mike Rounds. In 2014 he became the Presiding Judge and served until his appointment to the South Dakota Supreme Court.

=== South Dakota Supreme Court service ===
On October 28, 2020, Governor Kristi Noem announced her appointment of Myren to be a justice of the South Dakota Supreme Court to fill the vacancy left by the retirement of David Gilbertson. He was sworn into office on January 5, 2021.

Legal offices
Preceded by David Gilbertson	Associate Justice of the South Dakota Supreme Court; 2021–present	Incumbent
