= James Brown (South Dakota judge) =

American judge (c. 1864–1936)

James Brown (c. 1864 – December 20, 1936) was a justice of the South Dakota Supreme Court from 1927 to 1930.

Born in Crosshouse, Ayrshire, Scotland, Brown came to the United States in 1880 and received his law degree from the University of Iowa College of Law before moving to Chamberlain, South Dakota, in 1888. Brown practiced law in Chamberlain until November 1927, when he was appointed to the court by Governor William J. Bulow following the death of Justice John H. Gates. Brown unsuccessfully sought reelection to the seat in 1930, losing to Frederick A. Warren. Although election returns initially showed Brown winning the November election by 83 votes, Warren sought a recount which was concluded in January 1931, and led to Warren being declared the winner by 254 votes out of nearly 127,000 cast. Brown thereafter served as an assistant attorney general of South Dakota from February 1931 to April 1936.

Brown died in Pierre, South Dakota, at the age of 76.

Political offices
Preceded by John H. Gates	Justice of the South Dakota Supreme Court; 1927–1930	Succeeded by Frederick A. Warren
