= Ellison G. Smith =

American judge (1854–1935)

Justice of the South Dakota Supreme Court
- In office 1909–1923
- Succeeded by: Charles Hall Dillon

Member of the Dakota Territorial Council from the 2nd district
- In office 1887–1889
- Succeeded by: Abraham L. Van Osdel

Personal details
- Born: Ellison Griffith Smith; December 5, 1854; Cincinnati, Ohio, U.S.
- Died: September 3, 1935 (aged 80); Sioux City, Iowa, U.S.
- Political party: Republican
- Spouses: Anna F. Kirkwood (m. 1887; died 1909); Pearl Florence Hunkins (m. 1922; died 1925); Alberta V. Green (m. 1927)
- Children: 3
- Education: Lenox College (BA); Iowa State University (LLB)

Ellison Griffith Smith (December 5, 1854 – September 3, 1935) was a justice of the South Dakota Supreme Court from 1909 to 1923.

== Early life, education, and career ==
Born in Cincinnati, Ohio, to Amos G. and Mary (Ellison) Smith, the family moved to Delaware County, Iowa, during Smith's childhood, and he attended the public schools there. He received a B.A. from Lenox College in 1871, and an LL.B. from the Iowa State University in 1874, and in that year he was elected principal of the Mechanicsville high school and held that position for one year.

In 1876 he moved to Yankton, South Dakota, where he became a partner of Gideon C. Moody. Smith then took charge of the entire law business of the firm, which "was extensive and important and which included that of the office of register in bankruptcy", and Smith "gained recognition as an attorney of unusual ability". From 1878 to 1882 he served as territorial district attorney, and he was for some time the associate of the Hon. Hugh Campbell as special assistant United States Attorney. From 1886 to 1889 he was the representative of Yankton county in the territorial legislature, serving as a Republican.

== Judicial service and later life ==
For several years he also held the position of reporter for the territorial supreme court of Dakota, and in 1889, while the incumbent in that office, was elected judge of the first judicial circuit. He was reelected thereafter, serving in that capacity for twenty years, until April 1, 1909, when Governor Robert S. Vessey appointed Smith to a newly established seat on the supreme court of South Dakota, for the fourth district. In the general election held in November, 1910, he was elected to that office for a term of six years. In 1911, he became presiding judge of the court, and was reelected in 1916, serving in that capacity until 1922, when he was defeated in his next bid for reelection by Congressman Charles Hall Dillon.

On March 1, 1923, Smith became a professor at the University of South Dakota School of Law, remaining with that institution until his death.

== Personal life and death ==
In 1887, Smith married Anna Kirkwood of Ontario, Canada. She died in July, 1909, leaving their three children: Ellison G. Jr., who became a graduate of the Columbian University of Washington, D.C., and thereafter practiced law in Sioux City; Agnes G., who remained with her parents; and Amos Campbell, a civil engineer who became connected with the Chicago, Milwaukee & St. Paul Railroad at Aberdeen, South Dakota. In 1922, Smith married Pearl Florence Hunkins, who died in 1925. In 1927, Smith married Alberta V. Green, who survived him.

Smith died in Sioux City, Iowa, following a two-week bout of pneumonia.

Political offices
Preceded by Newly established seat	Justice of the South Dakota Supreme Court; 1909–1923	Succeeded by Charles Hall Dillon
