= Herbert B. Rudolph =

American judge (1894–1957)

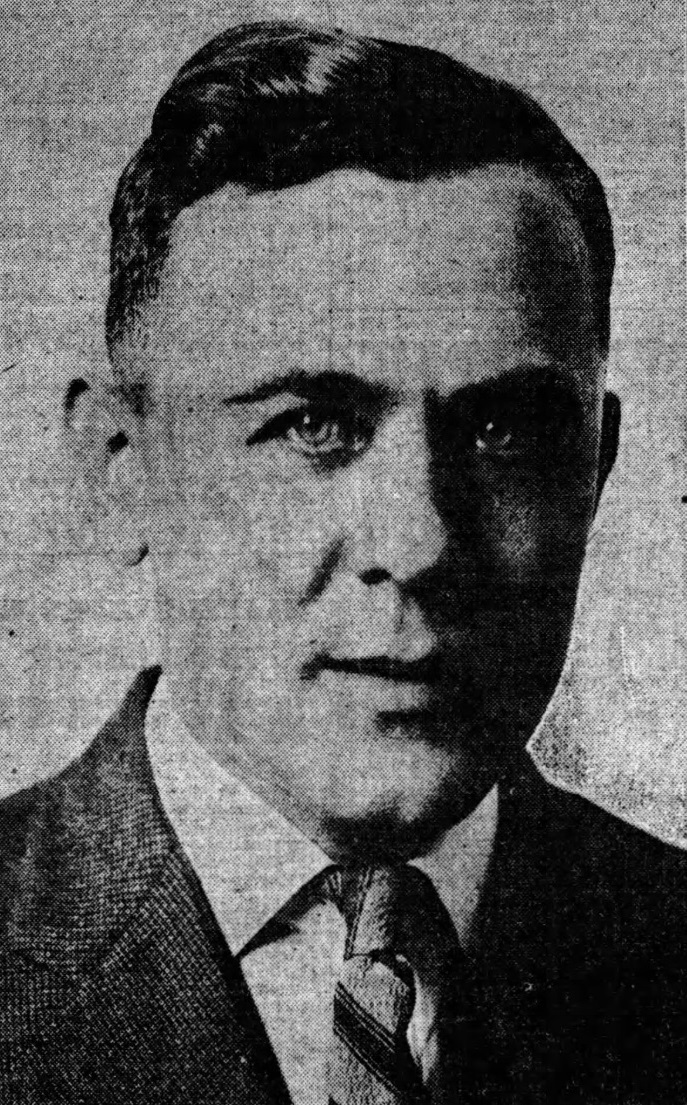
Herbert B. Rudolph, pictured in a 1926 campaign ad for election to the district court

Herbert Blaine Rudolph (May 22, 1894 – September 2, 1957) was an American attorney and jurist who served as a justice of the South Dakota Supreme Court from 1931 until his death on September 2, 1957.

== Early life and education ==
Rudolph was born in Canton, South Dakota in 1894. He graduated from the University of South Dakota, where he was the editor of the campus newspaper, The Volante, and received his Juris Doctor from the University of Michigan Law School.

Rudolph served as a lieutenant in the U.S. Army in World War I, and was a member of the American Legion.

== Career ==
After graduating, Rudolph worked as an attorney in Canton, before serving as county judge of Lincoln County.

On April 1, 1924, Rudolph was nominated by Governor William H. McMaster to serve on the second judicial circuit of South Dakota, succeeding Asa Forrest.

On March 27, 1931, Rudolph was appointed by Governor Warren Green to the South Dakota Supreme Court to succeed Justice Newton D. Burch. As a justice, his opinions were "recognized for their, terse, simple phrasealogy", and he frequently served "as the neutral member of the board which resolves differences between railway labor and management" for the state.

== Personal life and death ==
Rudolph married Neva Streator of Canton, Minnesota, with whom he had a daughter and a son. Neva suffered from multiple sclerosis later in life, and Rudolph was devoted to her care. Rudolph died at a hotel in Rochester, Minnesota, following a heart attack at the age of 63. He was buried at Forest Hill Cemetery, Canton, South Dakota.

Political offices
Preceded by Newton D. Burch	Justice of the South Dakota Supreme Court; 1931–1957	Succeeded by Harold Bogue
