= Charles Hall Dillon =

American judge

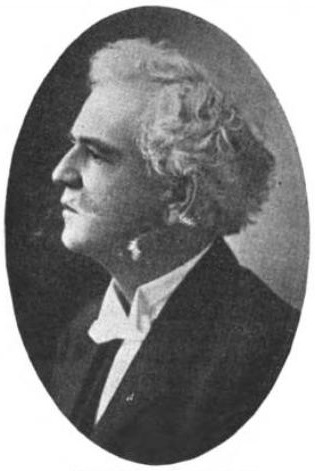

Member of the U.S. House of Representatives from South Dakota's 1st district
- In office March 4, 1913 – March 3, 1919
- Preceded by: none
- Succeeded by: Charles A. Christopherson

Member of the South Dakota Senate
- In office 1903

Personal details
- Born: December 18, 1853 near Jasper, Indiana, U.S.
- Died: September 15, 1929 (aged 75) Vermillion, South Dakota, U.S.
- Resting place: Yankton Cemetery
- Party: Republican
- Education: Indiana University Maurer School of Law
- Occupation: Lawyer

Charles Hall Dillon (December 18, 1853 – September 15, 1929) was a member of the United States House of Representatives from South Dakota (1913–19). He later served on the South Dakota Supreme Court. He was born near Jasper, Indiana in 1853.

== Early life and education ==
He attended the public schools, and received his undergraduate degree from Indiana University Bloomington in 1854, with a graduate law degree two years later from Indiana University Maurer School of Law. He started his career as an attorney in Jasper, later moving to Marion, Iowa in 1881, to Mitchell, Dakota Territory, in 1882, and to Yankton, South Dakota in 1884.

== Political career ==
He was first elected to the South Dakota Senate in 1903, serving through 1911. He was a delegate to the Republican National Conventions in 1900 and 1908. In 1913, he won election to the United States House of Representatives, remaining in that capacity through 1918, when he lost the Republican primary for renomination to a fourth term. On April 5, 1917, he was one of 50 representatives who voted against declaring war on Germany. He returned to Yankton, moving in 1922 to Vermillion, South Dakota, after being made an associate justice of the South Dakota Supreme Court, where he remained until 1926.

== Later career and death ==
He went on to seek election to the United States Senate, and retired from active political life in 1926.

=== Death and burial ===
He died in Vermillion, South Dakota in 1929, aged 75. He is buried in the Yankton Cemetery.

U.S. House of Representatives
Preceded by District created	Member of the U.S. House of Representatives from South Dakota's 1st congressional district 1913–1919	Succeeded by Charles A. Christopherson
Political offices
Preceded by Ellison G. Smith	Justice of the South Dakota Supreme Court; 1922–1926	Succeeded by Newton D. Burch
