= Samuel C. Polley =

American lawyer and judge (1864–1949)

Justice of the South Dakota Supreme Court
- In office 1913–1947

6th Secretary of State of South Dakota
- In office 1909–1913
- Governor: Robert S. Vessey
- Preceded by: David D. Wipf
- Succeeded by: Frank P. Glasner

Personal details
- Born: January 13, 1864 Winnebago Township, Minnesota, U.S.
- Died: January 13, 1949 (aged 85) Rapid City, South Dakota, U.S.
- Occupation: Politician, attorney, lawyer

Samuel Cleland Polley (January 13, 1864 – May 7, 1949) was a South Dakota lawyer, politician, and judge who served as Secretary of State of South Dakota and was a justice of the South Dakota Supreme Court. He served as secretary of state from 1908 to 1912. He served on the court from 1913 to 1947.

== Early life and education ==
Polley was born in Winnebago Valley in Houston County, Minnesota, to John C. and Amanda A. (Korn) Polley. His father was a farmer who moved to Houston County in 1857, and then to Aitkin County, Minnesota, in 1878, becoming the county's first farmer. Polley attended the State Normal School in St. Cloud, Minnesota, and the University of Minnesota, where he studied law, graduating with an LL. B. in 1890.

== Career ==
He lived in Deadwood, South Dakota, from 1890 and was in private practice. He also had a hand in litigation in the state. He was state attorney for Lawrence County, South Dakota, in 1901 and 1902. In 1908 he was elected Secretary of State of South Dakota, and was reelected to a second term in 1910. In 1908 he was a member of the Capitol Commission, which was responsible for the building of the new capitol at Pierre, the state board of pardons and the state board of assessment and equalization. In 1912 he was elected to the state Supreme Court; in 1930 he was reelected to a fourth six-year term. He was a lifelong Republican. In 1931, Polley served as presiding judge of the South Dakota Supreme Court, as shown in an advisory opinion issued by the court that year.

Polley was buried at Rose Hill Cemetery in Spearfish, South Dakota.

== Personal life ==
On November 15, 1899, Polley married Lenore V. McConnell, daughter of Alexander S. McConnell, at Deadwood. They had a daughter and two sons. He was a member of the Episcopal church.

Polley died in a convalescent home in Rapid City at the age of 85.

Political offices
Preceded by Dighton Corson	Justice of the South Dakota Supreme Court; 1913–1947	Succeeded by Charles R. Hayes
