= Charles R. Hayes =

American judge (1899–1968)

Charles R. Hayes (December 24, 1899 – May 30, 1968) was a justice of the South Dakota Supreme Court from 1947 to 1951.

Born in Deadwood, South Dakota, Hayes attended the local schools and volunteered to serve in the United States Army during World War I, from which he was discharged on December 11, 1918. He received an LL.B. from the University of South Dakota in 1924, and moved to Miami, Florida, to practice law until 1930, when he returned to South Dakota. He served in the South Dakota House of Representatives from 1937 to 1939, when he became a circuit judge of the South Dakota Eighth Judicial Circuit, where he remained until 1947. During that period, he also served as a specialist reserve captain in the governance of the United States Army from July 1943 to January 1944, and as a special justice of the South Dakota Supreme Court in the fall of 1945. In July 1947, Governor George T. Mickelson appointed Hayes to a seat on the South Dakota Supreme Court vacated by the retirement of Samuel C. Polley.

Hayes died from heart failure at St. Joseph's Hospital in Deadwood, at the age of 68.

Political offices
Preceded by Samuel C. Polley	Justice of the South Dakota Supreme Court; 1947–1951	Succeeded by Boyd Leedom
