= John Bailey Jones =

American judge (1927–2023)

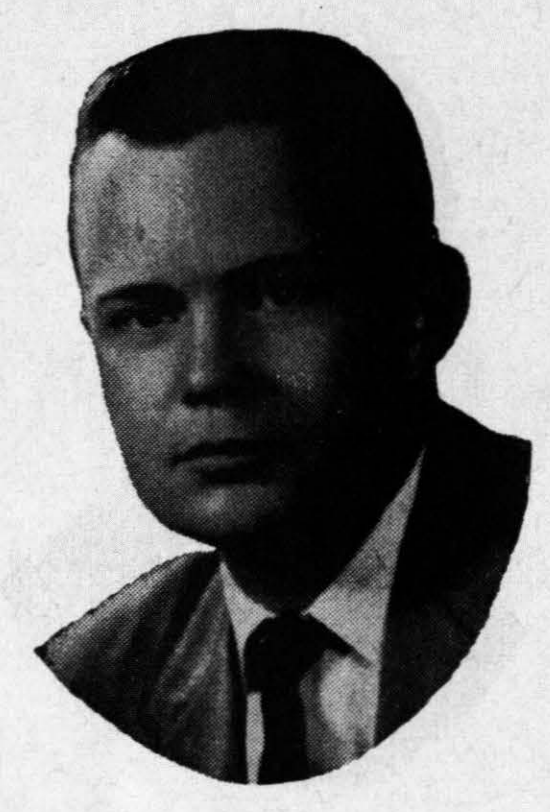
- Portrait as state legislator

Senior Judge of the United States District Court for the District of South Dakota
- In office January 1, 1995 – January 30, 2023

Chief Judge of the United States District Court for the District of South Dakota
- In office 1991–1994
- Preceded by: Donald J. Porter
- Succeeded by: Richard Battey

Judge of the United States District Court for the District of South Dakota
- In office November 18, 1981 – January 1, 1995
- Appointed by: Ronald Reagan
- Preceded by: Fred Joseph Nichol
- Succeeded by: Charles B. Kornmann

Member of the South Dakota House of Representatives from the 47th district
- In office 1957–1960

Personal details
- Born: March 30, 1927 Mitchell, South Dakota, U.S.
- Died: January 30, 2023 (aged 95) Sioux Falls, South Dakota, U.S.
- Education: University of South Dakota (B.S., LLB)

John Bailey Jones (March 30, 1927 – January 30, 2023) was a United States district judge of the United States District Court for the District of South Dakota.

== Early life, education, and career ==
Born in Mitchell, South Dakota, Jones was in the United States Naval Reserve from 1945 to 1947. He received a Bachelor of Science degree from the University of South Dakota in 1951 and a Bachelor of Laws from the University of South Dakota School of Law in 1953. He was in private practice in Presho, South Dakota from 1953 to 1966. He was a county judge of Lyman County, South Dakota from 1953 to 1956. He was a South Dakota state representative from 1956 to 1960. He was a circuit judge of the South Dakota Tenth Judicial Circuit from 1967 to 1974. He was a circuit judge of the South Dakota Sixth Judicial Circuit from 1974 to 1981.

== Federal judicial service ==
On October 20, 1981, Jones was nominated by President Ronald Reagan to a seat on the United States District Court for the District of South Dakota vacated by Judge Fred Joseph Nichol. Jones was confirmed by the United States Senate on November 18, 1981, and received his commission the same day. He served as chief judge from 1991 to 1994. He assumed senior status on January 1, 1995.

== Personal life and death ==
Jones died in Sioux Falls, South Dakota, on January 30, 2023, at the age of 95.

== Sources ==
Legal offices
| Preceded by Fred Joseph Nichol | Judge of the United States District Court for the District of South Dakota; 1981–1995 | Succeeded by Charles B. Kornmann |
| Preceded by Donald J. Porter | Chief Judge of the United States District Court for the District of South Dakota; 1991–1994 | Succeeded by Richard Battey |
