= Dwight Campbell =

American judge (1887–1964)

Justice of the South Dakota Supreme Court
- In office April 1, 1925 – 1937
- Preceded by: Frank Anderson

Personal details
- Born: Dwight Ezra Campbell; November 5, 1887 Orange City, Iowa, U.S.
- Died: June 15, 1964 (aged 76) Aberdeen, South Dakota, U.S.
- Party: Republican
- Spouse: Adelaide Pauline Caywood (m. 1912)
- Children: 1
- Education: Grinnell College; Harvard University
- Occupation: Judge

Dwight Ezra Campbell (November 5, 1887 – June 15, 1964) was a justice of the South Dakota Supreme Court from 1925 to 1937.

== Biography ==
Dwight Campbell was born in Orange City, Iowa on November 5, 1887. He was the child of Frank Ezra and Cornelia A. (Bell) Campbell. He graduated from Grinnell College in 1909, and received his law degree from Harvard University in 1912.

In 1912, Campbell married Adelaide Pauline Caywood of Des Moines, Iowa. He had one son, Dwight Ezra Campbell Jr.

Campbell began practicing as an attorney in Aberdeen, South Dakota, in 1912, serving as city attorney from 1921 to 1923, and in the South Dakota State Senate for Brown County, South Dakota, in 1923 as a Republican. In March 1925, Governor Carl Gunderson appointed Campbell to a seat on the state supreme court vacated by the retirement of ailing justice Frank Anderson; Campbell assumed office on April 1, 1925.

During his life, Campbell was a member of the American Bar Association, the Aberdeen Commercial and Country Clubs, the Pierre Kiwanis and Country Clubs, and the Alpha Sigma Phi and Phi Delta Phi fraternities. He was also a 32nd Degree Scottish Rite Mason and an Elk.

== Death ==
Campbell died at his home in Aberdeen, South Dakota, at the age of 76.

Political offices
Preceded by Frank Anderson	Justice of the South Dakota Supreme Court; 1925–1937	Succeeded by St. Clair Smith
