= Charles S. Hanson =

American judge (1911–1994)

Charles S. Hanson (April 14, 1911 – January 24, 1994) was a justice of the South Dakota Supreme Court from 1956 to 1973.

== Career ==
Born in Howard, South Dakota, he attended General Beadle College for two years. He received a B.A. from South Dakota State University and a J.D. from the University of South Dakota in 1934.

Hanson was a lawyer in Miner County from 1934 to 1948 when he was appointed circuit judge. He won election in 1950 and reelected in 1954.

In 1984, Hanson was honored by the State Bar of South Dakota for surpassing fifty years as an attorney.

== Personal life and death ==
Hanson and his wife Lois had a son, Dan Charles Hanson, who was also an attorney as well as a leader in the state's gay rights movement.

Hanson died at Brownsville Medical Center in Brownsville, Texas, at the age of 82.

Political offices
Preceded by Vernon R. Sickel	Justice of the South Dakota Supreme Court; 1956–1973	Succeeded by Francis G. Dunn
