= Charles S. Whiting =

American judge (1863–1922)

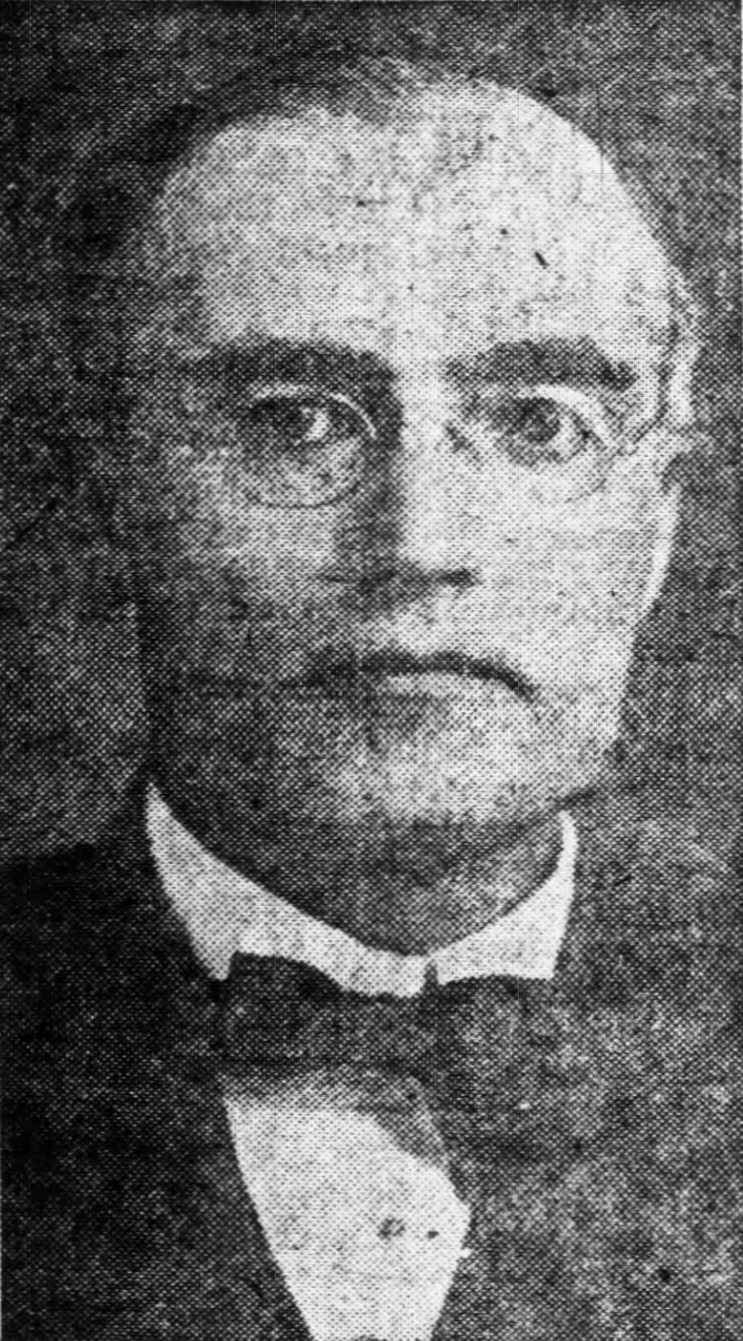
Charles S. Whiting

Charles S. Whiting (May 25, 1863 – March 25, 1922) was a justice of the South Dakota Supreme Court from 1908 until his death in 1922.

Born in Rochester, Minnesota, Whiting studied law at the University of Michigan and the University of Minnesota. He was prosecuting attorney of Kingsbury County, South Dakota for four terms. In 1903, Governor Charles N. Herreid appointed Whiting as a circuit court judge, where he served until 1908, when Governor Coe I. Crawford appointed Whiting to a seat on the state supreme court vacated by the death of Howard G. Fuller. Whiting remained on the supreme court until his own death.

Whiting died at the age of 59 after an anesthetic administered in preparation for an operation on his tonsils caused heart convulsions.

Political offices
Preceded by Howard G. Fuller	Justice of the South Dakota Supreme Court; 1908–1922	Succeeded by Carl G. Sherwood
