= Boyd Leedom =

American judge (1906–1969)

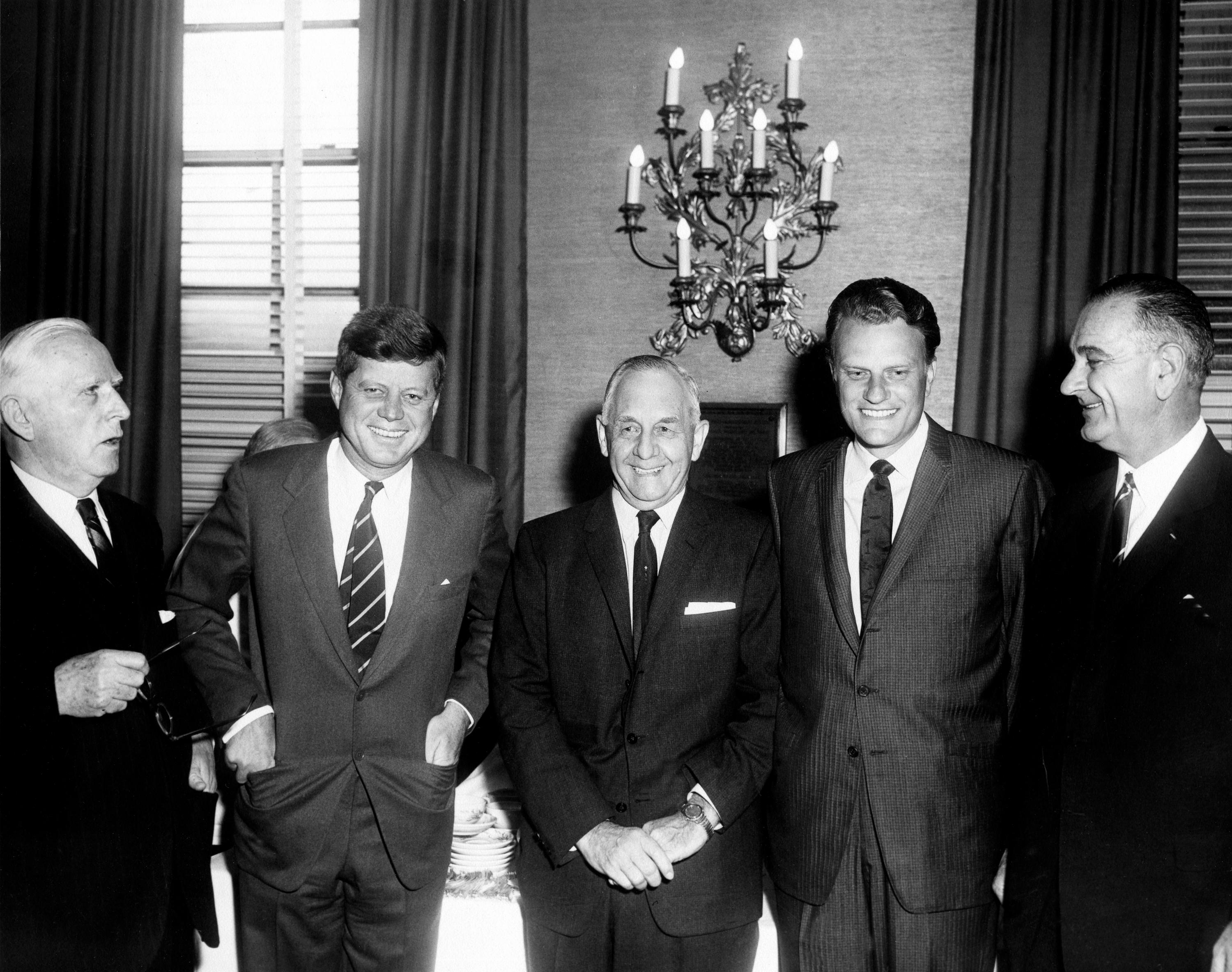
- Leedom (left) in 1961
- Born: 1906
- Died: August 11, 1969 (aged 62–63)
- Occupation: Justice of the South Dakota Supreme Court
- Known for: Member of the National Labor Relations Board

Boyd Stuart Leedom (1906 – August 11, 1969) was a justice of the South Dakota Supreme Court from 1951 to 1955, and a member of the National Labor Relations Board from 1955 to 1964.

Leedom, a Republican, was appointed to the NLRB by President Dwight D. Eisenhower, and served as its chair February 11, 1955 to June 3, 1961. He continued on the NLRB as a member until December 16, 1964. After Stanley Forman Reed resigned from the Supreme Court early in 1957, it was suggested by the Pennington County Republican organization and subsequently by Representative Ellis Yarnal Berry that Leedom be named as his replacement. Leedom's candidacy was not discussed outside South Dakota and neighbouring localities, while the seat ultimately went to Charles Evans Whittaker of the Eighth Circuit.

Political offices
Preceded by Charles R. Hayes	Justice of the South Dakota Supreme Court; 1951–1955	Succeeded by Alex Rentto
