= Admission to the bar in the United States =

Registration to practice law in a US jurisdiction

In the United States, admission to the bar is the granting of permission by a particular court system to a lawyer to practice law in the jurisdiction. Each U.S. state and jurisdiction (e.g. territories under federal control) has its own court system and sets its own rules and standards for bar admission. In most cases, a person is admitted or called to the bar of the highest court in the jurisdiction and is thereby authorized to practice law in the jurisdiction. Federal courts, although often overlapping in admission requirements with states, include additional steps for admission.

Typically, lawyers seeking admission to the bar of one of the U.S. states must earn a Juris Doctor degree from a law school approved by the jurisdiction, pass a bar exam and professional responsibility examination, and undergo a character and fitness evaluation, with some exceptions to each requirement.

A lawyer admitted in one state is not automatically allowed to practice in any other. Some states have reciprocal agreements that allow attorneys from other states to practice without sitting for another's bar exam.

== Terminology ==
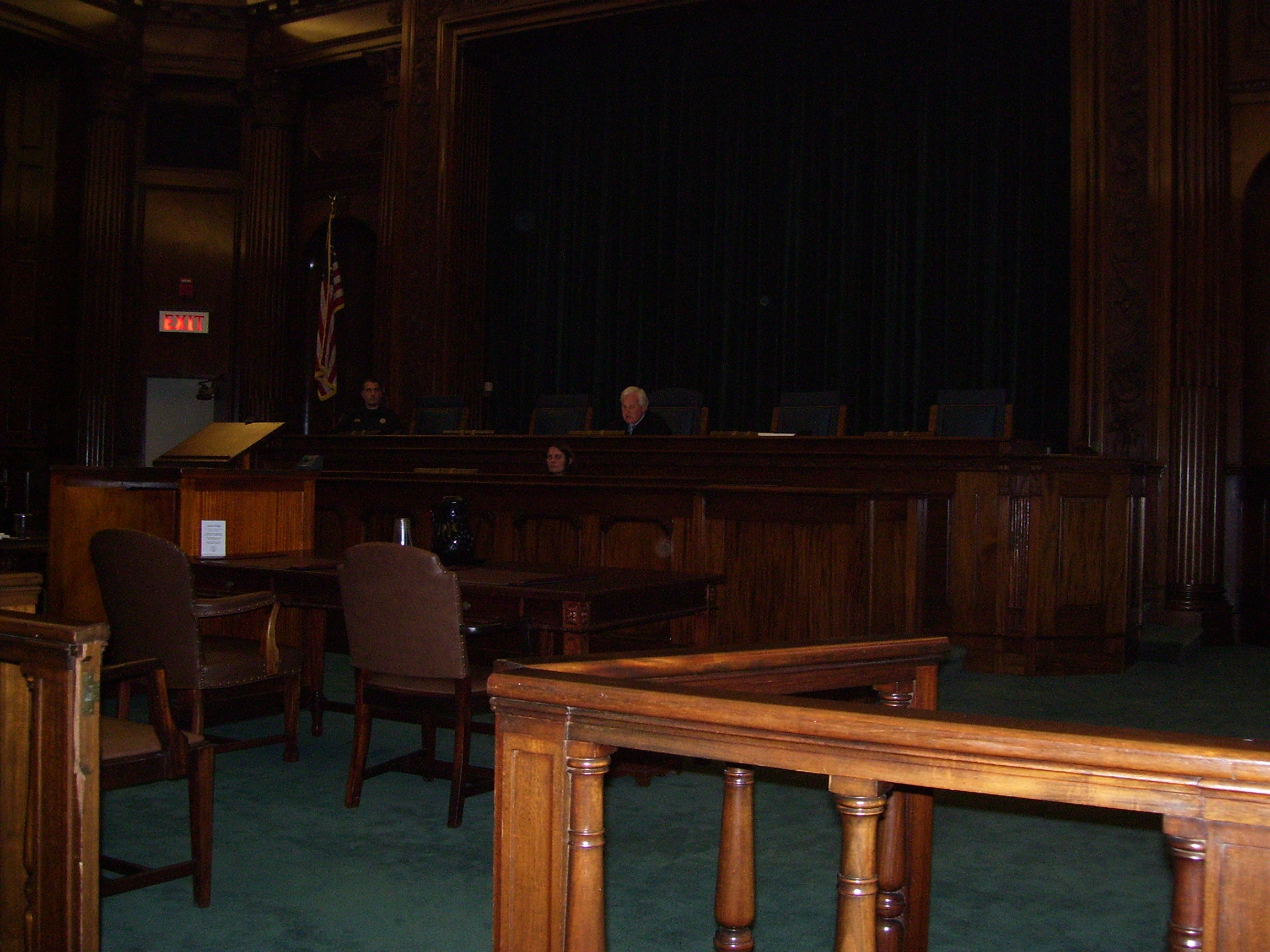
The bar (railing) at the Rhode Island Supreme Court

The use of the term bar comes from English custom. In the early 16th century, a railing divided the hall in the Inns of Court, with students occupying the body of the hall and readers or benchers on the other side. Students who officially became lawyers were "called to the bar", crossing the symbolic physical barrier and thus "admitted to the bar". In modern courtrooms, a railing may still be in place to enclose the space which is occupied by legal counsel as well as the criminal defendants and civil litigants who are before the court.

== History ==
The first bar exam in what is now the United States was instituted by Delaware Colony in 1763, as an oral examination before a judge. Many other American colonies soon followed suit. In the early United States, most states' requirements for bar admission included a period of study under a lawyer or judge (a practice called "reading the law") and a brief examination. Examinations were generally oral, and applicants were sometimes exempted from the examination if they had clerked in a law office for a certain number of years. During the 19th century, admission requirements became lower in many states. Most states continued to require both apprenticeship and examination, but these apprenticeships became shorter and examinations generally brief and casual.

After 1870, law schools began to emerge as an alternative to apprenticeship. This rise was accompanied by the practice of diploma privilege, whereby law school graduates received automatic admission to the bar. Diploma privilege reached its peak between 1879 and 1921. In most states, diploma privilege only applied to those who graduated law school in the state where they practiced. Examinations continued to exist for those ineligible for diploma privilege, and were often administered by committees of attorneys. Between 1890 and 1920, most states replaced oral examinations with written bar examinations. Written examinations became commonplace as lawyers began to practice in states other than those where they were trained.

In 1921, the American Bar Association formally expressed a preference for required written bar examinations in place of diploma privilege for law school graduates. In subsequent decades, the prevalence of diploma privilege declined deeply. By 1948, only 13 law schools in 9 states retained diploma privilege. By 1980, only Mississippi, Montana, South Dakota, West Virginia, and Wisconsin honored diploma privilege. As of 2020, only Wisconsin allows J.D. graduates of accredited law schools to seek admission to the state bar without passing a bar examination.

== Admission requirements ==
Today, each U.S. jurisdiction has its own rules which govern admission to its bar. Generally, admission to a bar requires that a candidate does the following:

- Earn a Juris Doctor degree or read law
- Pass a professional responsibility examination or equivalent
- Pass a bar examination (except where diploma privilege is allowed)
- Undergo a character and fitness certification
- Formally apply for admission and pay required fees

=== Educational requirement ===
Most jurisdictions require that candidates earn a Juris Doctor degree from an approved law school, usually a school accredited by the American Bar Association (ABA). Exceptions include Alabama, California, Connecticut, Massachusetts, West Virginia, and Tennessee, which allow individuals who have not graduated from state-approved law schools to take the bar exam. The state of New York makes special provision for persons educated in the common law overseas, with most LLB degree holders being qualified to take the bar exam and be admitted to the bar. In California, the Committee of Bar Examiners (CBE) of the State Bar of California allows graduates of certain "registered" law schools to take the California Bar Examination, although those schools are not accredited by the ABA or the CBE. However, students at such law schools must take and pass the First-Year Law Students' Examination (commonly referred to as the "baby bar") administered by the CBE, and may continue their studies upon passage of this exam.

Four jurisdictions, namely California, Vermont, Virginia and Washington, allow applicants to study under a judge or practicing attorney for an extended period of time rather than attending any law school. This method is known as "reading law" or "reading the law". New York requires bar applicants who have "read law" to also have at least one year of law school study. Maine allows students with two years of law school to serve an apprenticeship in lieu of their third year. New Hampshire's only law school has an alternative licensing program that allows students who have completed certain curricula and a separate exam to bypass the regular bar examination. Until the late 19th century, reading the law was common and law schools were rare. For example, Abraham Lincoln did not attend law school, and did not even read with anyone else.

Unlike some other jurisdictions, the American legal system, generally, has no formal apprenticeship or clinical training requirements for bar admission, with a few exceptions. Delaware requires that applicants serve five months in a clerkship with a lawyer in the state. Vermont had a similar requirement but eliminated it in 2016. Washington requires, since 2005, that applicants complete a minimum of four hours of approved pre-admission education. Some law schools have tried to rectify this lack of experience by requiring supervised "Public Service Requirements" of all graduates. States that encourage law students to undergo clinical training or perform public service in the form of pro bono representation may allow students to appear and practice in limited court settings under the supervision of an admitted attorney. (Note: For example, in New York's Third Appellate Department, "Any officer or agency of the state ... or any legal aid organization ... may make application to the presiding justice of this court for an order authorizing the employment or utilization of law students who have completed at least two semesters of law school and eligible law school graduates as law interns to render and perform legal services ... which the officer, agency or organization making the application is authorized to perform." Similarly, New York's state Department of Labor allows law students to practice in unemployment benefits hearings before the agency.)

=== Professional responsibility requirement ===
In all jurisdictions except Puerto Rico and Wisconsin, candidates must pass the Multistate Professional Responsibility Examination (MPRE), which covers the professional responsibility rules governing lawyers. This test is not administered separately from bar examinations, and most candidates usually sit for the MPRE while still in law school, right after studying professional responsibility (a required course in all ABA-accredited law schools). Some states require that a candidate pass the MPRE before being allowed to sit for the bar exam. New Jersey waives the MPRE for candidates who have received a grade of C Minus or better in a law school professional ethics class.

=== Bar examination requirement ===
In all jurisdictions except Wisconsin and Oregon, candidates are required to pass a bar examination, usually administered by the state bar association or under the authority of the supreme court of the particular state. Wisconsin and Oregon are the only states that do not require the bar examination. In Wisconsin, graduates of ABA-accredited law schools in the state (currently the University of Wisconsin Law School and Marquette University Law School) may be admitted to the state bar through diploma privilege. Oregon permits students who have completed a Juris Doctor program with certain required coursework to obtain bar admission through a Supervised Practice Portfolio Examination.

State bar examinations are usually administered by the state bar association or under the authority of the supreme court of the particular state. In 2011, the National Conference of Bar Examiners (NCBE) created the Uniform Bar Examination (UBE), which has since been adopted by 37 jurisdictions (out of a possible 56). The UBE consists of three parts: the Multistate Bar Examination (MBE), a standardized test consisting of 200 multiple-choice questions; the Multistate Essay Examination (MEE), a uniform though not standardized test that examines a candidate's ability to analyze legal issues and communicate them effectively in writing; and the Multistate Performance Test (MPT), a "closed-universe" test in which each candidate is required to perform a standard lawyering task, such as a memo or brief.

Non-UBE jurisdictions usually also include a combination of multiple-choice questions, essay questions, and performance tests. Many jurisdictions use some NCBE-created components. For example, all jurisdictions except Louisiana and Puerto Rico use the MBE. Many states also use state-specific content is usually included in the examination, such as essays in Washington, Minnesota and Massachusetts. Some states, such as Florida, include both essays and multiple-choice questions in their state-specific sections.

=== Character and fitness requirement ===
Most states also require an applicant to demonstrate good moral character. Character Committees look to an applicant's history to determine whether the person will be fit to practice law in the future. This history may include prior criminal arrests or convictions, academic honor code violations, prior bankruptcies or evidence of financial irresponsibility, addictions or psychiatric disorders, sexual misconduct, prior civil lawsuits or driving history. In recent years, such investigations have increasingly focused on the extent of an applicant's financial debt, as increased student loans have prompted concern for whether a new lawyer will honor legal or financial obligations. For example, in early 2009, a person who had passed the New York bar and had over $400,000 in unpaid student loans was denied admission by the New York Supreme Court, Appellate Division due to excessive indebtedness, despite being recommended for admission by the state's character and fitness committee. He moved to void the denial, but the court upheld its original decision in November 2009, by which time his debt had accumulated to nearly $500,000. More recently, the Court of Appeals of Maryland rejected the application of a candidate who displayed a pattern of financial irresponsibility, applied for a car loan with false information, and failed to disclose a recent bankruptcy. Most states require an applicant to secure character certification from the law school attended and also provide additional character references.

When applying to take a state's bar examination, applicants are required to complete extensive questionnaires seeking the disclosure of significant personal, financial and professional information. For example, in Virginia, each applicant must complete a 24-page questionnaire and may appear before a committee for an interview if the committee initially rejects their application. The same is true in the State of Maryland, and in many other jurisdictions, where the state's supreme court has the ultimate authority to determine whether an applicant will be admitted to the bar. In completing the bar application, and at all stages of this process, honesty is paramount. An applicant who fails to disclose material facts, no matter how embarrassing or problematic, will greatly jeopardize the applicant's chance of practicing law.

=== Formal admission ===
Once all prerequisites have been satisfied, an attorney must formally apply for admission. The mechanics of this final stage vary widely. For example, in California, the admittee simply takes an oath before any state judge or notary public, who then co-signs the admission form. Upon receiving the signed form, the State Bar of California adds the new admittee to a list of applicants recommended for admission to the bar which is automatically ratified by the Supreme Court of California at its next regular weekly conference; then everyone on the list is added to the official roll of attorneys. The State Bar also holds large-scale formal admission ceremonies in conjunction with the U.S. Court of Appeals for the Ninth Circuit and the federal district courts, usually in the same convention centers where new admittees took the bar examination, but these are optional. In other jurisdictions, such as the District of Columbia, new admittees were historically required to attend a special session of court to take the oath in person, though recent rule changes now permit admission in absentia.

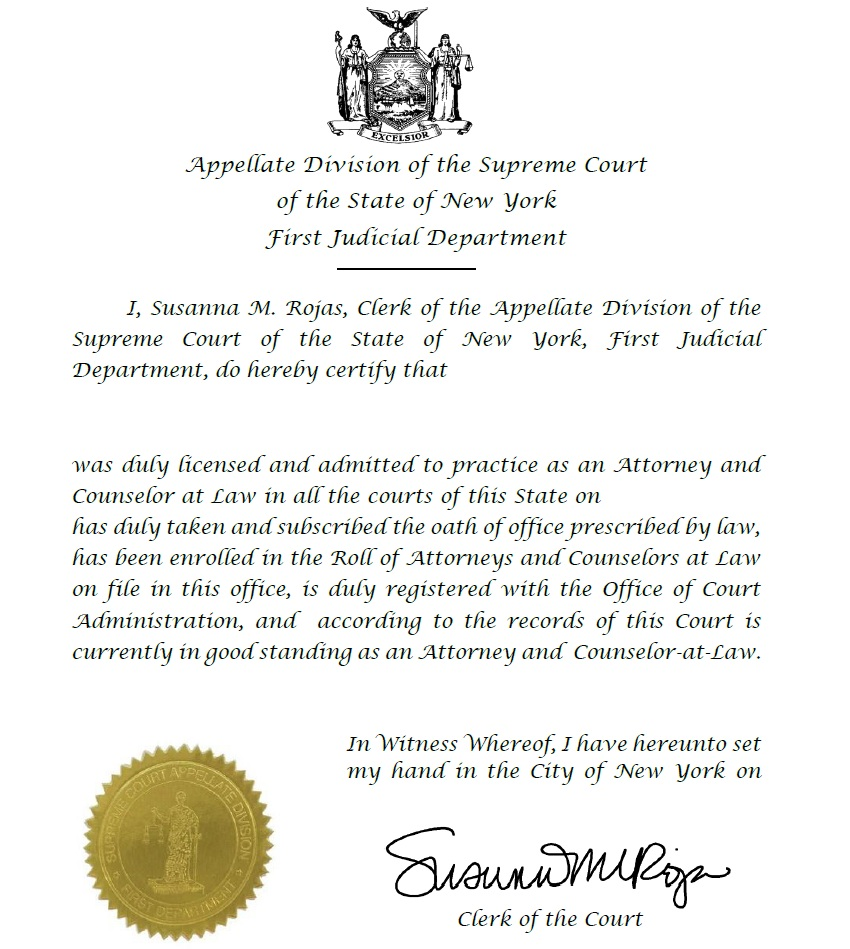
Certificate of Admission to practice as an attorney issued by the New York Supreme Court, Appellate Division, First Judicial Department

A successful applicant is permitted to practice law after being sworn in as an officer of the Court; in most states, that means they may begin filing pleadings and appearing as counsel of record in any trial or appellate court in the state. Upon admission, a new lawyer is often issued a certificate of admission, usually, but not always from the state's highest court.

Two states are exceptions to the general rule of admission by the state's highest court. In New York, admission is granted by one of the state's four intermediate appellate courts corresponding generally to the Department of residence of the applicant; once admitted, however, the applicant can practice in any (non-federal) court in the state. In Georgia, each new attorney is admitted to practice by the Superior Court of any county, typically the county in which he or she resides or desires to practice. The new attorney, although licensed to practice in any local trial court in the state, must separately seek admission to the Georgia Court of Appeals as well as the Georgia Supreme Court.

In most states, lawyers are also issued a unique bar identification number. In California, the state bar number must appear on all documents submitted by a lawyer.

== Admission in multiple states ==
Most attorneys seek and obtain admission only to the bar of one state, and then rely upon pro hac vice admissions for the occasional out-of-state matter. However, many new attorneys do seek admission in multiple states, either by taking multiple bar exams or applying for reciprocity. This is common for those living and working in metro areas which sprawl into multiple states, such as Washington, D.C., and New York City. Attorneys based in predominantly rural states or rural areas near state borders frequently seek admission in multiple states in order to enlarge their client base.

Note that in states that allow reciprocity, admission on motion may have conditions that do not apply to those admitted by examination. For example, attorneys admitted on motion in Virginia are required to show evidence of the intent to practice full-time in Virginia and are prohibited from maintaining an office in any other jurisdiction. Also, their licenses automatically expire when they no longer maintain an office in Virginia.

== Types of state bar associations ==
Admission to a state's bar is not necessarily the same as membership in that state's bar association. There are two kinds of state bar associations:

=== Mandatory (integrated) bar ===
Thirty-two states and the District of Columbia require membership in the state's bar association to practice law there. This arrangement is called having a mandatory, unified, or integrated bar.

For example, the State Bar of Texas is an agency of the judiciary and is under the administrative control of the Texas Supreme Court, and is composed of those persons licensed to practice law in Texas; each such person is required by law to join the State Bar by registering with the clerk of the Texas Supreme Court.

=== Voluntary and private bar associations ===
A voluntary bar association is a private organization of lawyers. Each may have social, educational, and lobbying functions, but does not regulate the practice of law or admit lawyers to practice or discipline lawyers. An example of this is the New York State Bar Association.

There is a statewide voluntary bar association in each of the eighteen states that have no mandatory or integrated bar association. There are also many voluntary bar associations organized by geographic area (e.g., Chicago Bar Association), interest group or practice area (e.g., Federal Communications Bar Association), or ethnic or identity community (e.g., Hispanic National Bar Association).

The American Bar Association (ABA) is a nationwide voluntary bar association with the largest membership in the United States. The National Bar Association was formed in 1925 to focus on the interests of African-American lawyers after they were denied membership by the ABA.

== Federal courts ==
Although generally requiring state bar admission, admission to a state bar alone does not automatically entitle an individual to practice in federal courts, such as the United States district courts or United States court of appeals. In general, an already state-qualified attorney is admitted to the bar of these federal courts upon payment of a fee and taking an oath of admission. An attorney must apply to each district separately. For instance, a Texas attorney who practices in federal courts throughout the state would have to be admitted separately to the Northern District of Texas, the Eastern District, the Southern District, and the Western District. To handle a federal appeal, the attorney would also be required to be admitted separately to the Fifth Circuit Court of Appeals for general appeals and to the Federal Circuit for appeals that fall within that court's jurisdiction. As the bankruptcy courts are divisions of the district courts, admission to a particular district court usually includes automatic admission to the corresponding bankruptcy court. The bankruptcy courts require that attorneys attend training sessions on electronic filing before they may file motions.

Some federal district courts have extra admission requirements. For instance, the Southern District of Texas requires attorneys seeking admission to attend a class on that District's practice and procedures. The District of Puerto Rico has administered its own bar exam since 2004, part of which is an essay which tests for English proficiency. For some time, the Southern District of Florida administered an entrance exam, but that requirement was eliminated by Court order in February 2012. The District of Rhode Island requires candidates to attend classes and to pass an examination.

An attorney wishing to practice before the Supreme Court of the United States must apply to do so, must be admitted to the bar of the highest court of a state for three years, must be sponsored by two attorneys already admitted to the Supreme Court bar, must pay a fee and must take either a spoken or written oath.

Various specialized courts with subject-matter jurisdiction, including the United States Tax Court, have separate admission requirements. The Tax Court is unusual in that a non-attorney may be admitted to practice. However, the non-attorney must take and pass an examination administered by the Court to be admitted, while attorneys are not required to take the exam. Most members of the Tax Court bar are attorneys.

Admission to the Court of Appeals for the Federal Circuit is open to any attorney admitted to practice and in good standing with the U.S. Supreme Court, any of the other federal courts of appeal, any federal district court, the highest court of any state, the Court of International Trade, the Court of Federal Claims, the Court of Appeals for Veterans Claims, or the District of Columbia Court of Appeals. An oath and fee are required.

Some federal courts also have voluntary bar associations associated with them. For example, the Bar Association of the Fifth Federal Circuit, the Bar Association of the Third Federal Circuit, or the Association of the Bar of the United States Court of Appeals for the Eighth Circuit all serve attorneys admitted to practice before specific federal courts of appeals.

=== District Court Reciprocity ===
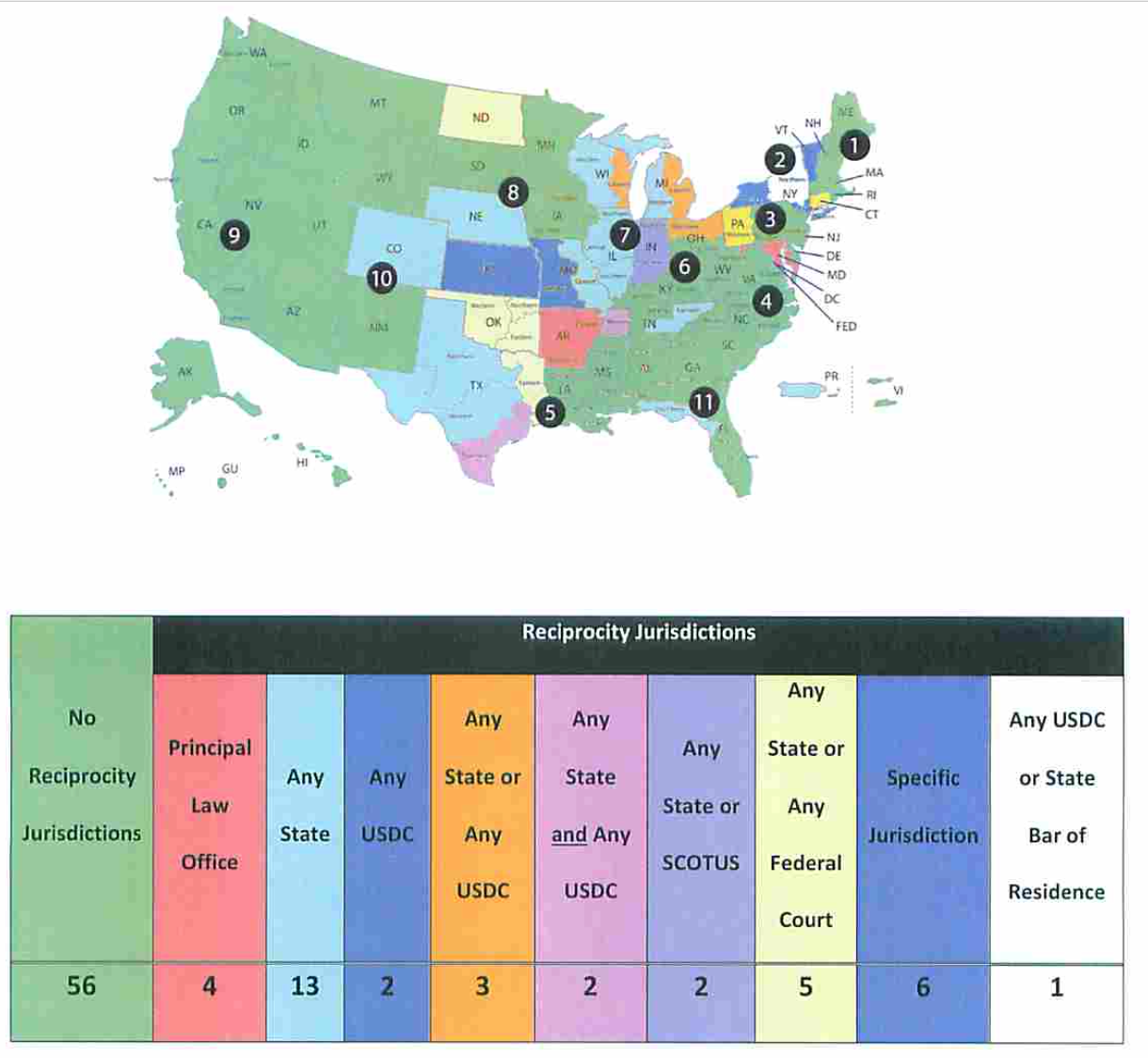
United States District Court reciprocity map

56 districts (around 60% of all district courts) require an attorney to be admitted to practice in the state where the district court sits. The other 39 districts (around 40% of all district courts) extend admission to certain lawyers admitted in other states, although conditions vary from court to court. Only 13 districts extend admission to attorneys admitted to any U.S. state bar. This requirement is not necessarily consistent within a state. For example, in Ohio, the Southern District generally requires membership in the Ohio state bar for full admission, while full admission to the Northern District is open to all attorneys in good standing with any U.S. jurisdiction. In the Northern District of Ohio, admitted attorneys need not maintain an office in the district, or associate with a local attorney, unless ordered to do so by the court. The District of Vermont requires membership in the Vermont State Bar or membership in the Bar of a federal district court in the First and Second Circuits. The District of Connecticut, within the Second Circuit, will admit any member of the Connecticut bar or of the bar of any United States District Court.

=== Patent practice ===
Persons wishing to prosecute patent applications (i.e., represent clients in the process of obtaining a patent) must first pass the USPTO registration examination, frequently referred to as the "patent bar." Detailed information about applying for the registration examination is available in the USPTO's General Requirements Bulletin. Although only registered patent attorneys or patent agents can prosecute patent applications in the USPTO, passing the patent bar is not necessary to advise clients on patent infringement, to litigate patent issues in court, or to prosecute trademark applications.

A J.D. degree is not required to sit for the patent bar, but a science or engineering degree is required. Lawyers who pass the patent bar exam may refer to themselves as a patent attorney (rules of legal ethics prohibit lawyers from using the title "patent attorney" unless they are admitted to practice before the USPTO). While patent lawyers have a relevant four-year degree and many have graduate technical degrees, patent litigation attorneys do not have to be patent attorneys, although some are. On the other hand, non-lawyers who pass the patent bar are referred to as "patent agents." Patent agents may not hold themselves out as licensed attorneys.

Applicants must have U.S. citizenship, permanent residency (a Green Card), or a valid work visa for a patent-related job. An applicant on a work visa, upon passing the exam, is only given "limited recognition" to perform work for the employer listed on the work visa. Only U.S. citizens can maintain their registration in the patent bar while they are working outside the United States. Additionally, the USPTO requires that applicants to the patent bar have earned a bachelor's degree. Applicants are categorized as having earned an accredited "bachelor's degree in a recognized technical subject" (category A), having earned a "bachelor's degree in another subject" with sufficient credits to qualify for the exam (category B), or having "practical engineering or scientific experience" (category C).

Applicants in "category A" must have an engineering or "hard science" degree in a field listed in the General Requirements Bulletin. Note that the degree field as shown on the diploma must be exactly as it appears on the list; for example, "aerospace engineering" does not qualify under category A, while "aeronautical engineering" does. A computer science degree is accepted under "category A" as long as it is received from an Accreditation Board for Engineering and Technology (ABET)-accredited or CSAB-accredited program.

Applicants in "category B" must have earned a bachelor's degree, and must have sufficient credits in science and engineering courses to meet the USPTO's requirements; the number of credits depends on the specific discipline. The coursework must include a minimum of eight credit-hours of acceptable classes in either chemistry or physics. Each course being relied upon by the applicant for credit is evaluated by the USPTO's Office of Enrollment and Discipline for suitability; see the General Requirements Bulletin for the details. Engineering and Computer Science majors whose degree programs do not meet "category A" requirements (typically due to the named field of the degree or, especially in computer science, lack of program accreditation) can apply under "category B."

Applicants in "category C" may present evidence of passing the Fundamentals of Engineering exam as proof of technical education. They must also have a bachelor's degree. Although the admission requirements allow applicants to substitute proof of technical experience for technical education, this is rarely done in practice.

=== Military law ===
Service as a member of a military service's Judge Advocate General's Corps requires graduation from an ABA-accredited law school, a license to practice law in any state or territory of the United States, and training at the specialized law school of one of the three military services (The Judge Advocate General's Legal Center and School for the Army, the Naval Justice School for the Navy, Marine Corps, and Coast Guard, and the Air Force Judge Advocate General School for the Air Force).

In a court-martial, the accused is always provided JAG Corps defense counsel at no expense to the accused, but is also entitled to retain private civilian counsel at his or her own expense. Civilian counsel must either be a member of both a federal bar and a state bar, or must be otherwise authorized to practice law by a recognized licensing authority and certified by the military judge as having sufficient familiarity with criminal law as applicable in courts-martial.
