= Donald J. Porter =

American judge

Senior Judge of the United States District Court for the District of South Dakota
- In office March 16, 1992 – February 17, 2003

Chief Judge of the United States District Court for the District of South Dakota
- In office 1985–1991
- Preceded by: Andrew Wendell Bogue
- Succeeded by: John Bailey Jones

Judge of the United States District Court for the District of South Dakota
- In office May 11, 1979 – March 16, 1992
- Appointed by: Jimmy Carter
- Preceded by: Seat established by 92 Stat. 1629
- Succeeded by: Lawrence L. Piersol

Personal details
- Born: Donald James Porter; March 24, 1921 Madison, South Dakota
- Died: February 17, 2003 (aged 81) Pierre, South Dakota
- Education: University of South Dakota (BS); University of South Dakota School of Law (LLB)

Donald James Porter (March 24, 1921 – February 17, 2003) was a United States district judge of the United States District Court for the District of South Dakota.

== Education and career ==
Born in Madison, South Dakota, Porter received a Bachelor of Science degree from the University of South Dakota in 1942 and a Bachelor of Laws from the University of South Dakota School of Law in 1943. He was in the United States Army during World War II, from 1943 to 1946. He was staff attorney of the Office of Temporary Controls, in Sioux Falls, South Dakota, in 1946. He was also staff attorney of the Office of Temporary Controls, in Saint Paul, Minnesota, in 1947. He was in private practice, in Chamberlain, South Dakota, from 1947 to 1959. He was the state attorney of Brule County, South Dakota, from 1948 to 1952. He served as a South Dakota state representative, from 1955 to 1957. He was the state attorney of Brule County, from 1957 to 1959. He was in private practice in Pierre, South Dakota, from 1959 to 1977.

== Judicial service ==
=== State supreme court ===
In 1976, Porter was appointed by Governor Richard F. Kneip to a seat as an associate justice of the South Dakota Supreme Court, serving from 1977 to 1979. In his 1978 reelection bid, Porter was defeated by opponent Jon Fosheim by 45 votes out of over 49,000 votes cast.

=== Federal judicial service ===
Porter was nominated by President Jimmy Carter, on March 15, 1979, to the United States District Court for the District of South Dakota, to a new seat created by 92 Stat. 1629. He was confirmed by the United States Senate, on May 10, 1979, and received his commission on May 11, 1979. He served as Chief Judge from 1985 to 1991. He assumed senior status on March 16, 1992, taking inactive senior status in 1993. While he remained a federal judge, he no longer heard cases or participated in the business of the court. He remained in that status until his death.

=== Notable law clerk ===
Among the judicial law clerks that served Porter was Roberto Lange, also a United States district judge.

== Death ==
Porter died on February 17, 2003, in Pierre of complications of Alzheimer's disease.

== Sources ==
Legal offices
Preceded by Fred R. Winans	Justice of the South Dakota Supreme Court; 1977–1979	Succeeded by Jon Fosheim
Preceded by Seat established by 92 Stat. 1629	Judge of the United States District Court for the District of South Dakota; 1979–1992	Succeeded by Lawrence L. Piersol
Preceded by Andrew Wendell Bogue	Chief Judge of the United States District Court for the District of South Dakota; 1985–1991	Succeeded by John Bailey Jones
