= Alex Rentto =

American judge (1905–1995)

Alexander Rentto (October 5, 1905 – March 7, 1995) was a justice of the South Dakota Supreme Court from May 1, 1955, to September 15, 1971.

Born in Lead, South Dakota, Rentto attended the local high school and graduated from South Dakota State College and received his law degree from the University of South Dakota School of Law. Rentto practiced law in Sioux Falls, South Dakota, then worked for a year at the Federal Land Bank in Omaha, Nebraska, and was later elected state's attorney in Lawrence County, South Dakota, from 1934 to 1939, after which he returned to private practice. In 1943, Rentto was appointed as a county court judge, and was elected to the circuit court in 1947. In 1955, Governor Joe Foss appointed Rentto to a seat on the South Dakota Supreme Court vacated by the resignation of Boyd Leedom, who had accepted an appointment to the National Labor Relations Board.

Rentto resigned from the court in 1971, but remained active as a senior justice until 1975. He died from heart failure at Northern Hills General Hospital in Deadwood, South Dakota, at the age of 89, and was buried at South Lead Cemetery.

Political offices
| Preceded by Boyd Leedom | Justice of the South Dakota Supreme Court; 1955–1975 | Succeeded by James M. Doyle |
