= Janine M. Kern =

American judge (born 1961)

Janine Kern

Associate Justice of the South Dakota Supreme Court
- In office January 5, 2015 – December 8, 2025
- Appointed by: Dennis Daugaard
- Preceded by: John K. Konenkamp
- Succeeded by: Robert Gusinsky

Personal details
- Born: February 14, 1961 (age 65)
- Education: Arizona State University, Tempe (BS); University of Minnesota (JD)

Janine M. Kern (born February 14, 1961) is an American attorney and jurist who served as an associate justice of the South Dakota Supreme Court.

== Education ==
She graduated from Arizona State University with a Bachelor of Science in 1982, and graduated from the University of Minnesota Law School in 1985.

== Career ==
She served in the Attorney General of South Dakota's office from 1985 to 1996, and became a circuit court judge in the Seventh Judicial Circuit in 1996. She was appointed to the Supreme Court on November 25, 2014, by Governor Dennis Daugaard, and took office on January 5, 2015. She was sworn in by her father, retired South Dakota circuit court judge Paul James Kern. Kern retired from the court in December 2025.

Legal offices
Preceded by John K. Konenkamp	Associate Justice of the South Dakota Supreme Court; 2015–2025	Succeeded by Robert Gusinsky
