= Newton D. Burch =

American judge (1871–1931)

Newton Dexter Burch (June 16, 1871 – March 17, 1931) was a justice of the South Dakota Supreme Court from 1926 to 1931.

Born on a farm in Stewartsville, Missouri, Burch was primarily a farmer in Texas and Nebraska until he was 23, thereafter receiving a law degree from the University of Nebraska in 1898. Burch entered the practice of law in Nebraska, practicing law there until 1907 and serving as the county attorney of Boyd County, Nebraska from 1903 to 1907. He then moved to Dallas, South Dakota, where he practiced law and served two terms as mayor. In 1921, Burch was elected to the South Dakota Eleventh Circuit court judge.

== Personal life and death ==
In 1899, Burch married Sarah E. Jarman, with whom he had three children.

He died in Pierre, South Dakota at the age of 60, following an intracerebral hemorrhage.

Political offices
Preceded by Charles Hall Dillon	Justice of the South Dakota Supreme Court; 1926–1931	Succeeded by Herbert B. Rudolph
