= Carl G. Sherwood =

American judge (1855–1938)

Carl G. Sherwood (January 18, 1855 – August 18, 1938) was a justice of the South Dakota Supreme Court from 1922 to 1931.

Born in Whitney Point, New York, to George Sherwood, a farmer, and Mary Ann Jeffords, Sherwood attended high school in Binghamton, New York. He did not attend a college, but read law, first with E. K Clark in Binghamton, and then with A. R. McCoy in Clinton, Iowa, to gain admission to the bar in the Dakota Territory, in 1881. He entered into practice in what would later become Clark County, South Dakota, also serving as the county's register of deeds from 1882 to 1986. He was elected as a delegate to state constitutional conventions in 1883 and 1889, was thereafter a member of the South Dakota State Senate, representing the 29th District of South Dakota from 1889 to 1891.

In 1912, Governor Robert S. Vessey appointed Sherwood to a seat on the Third Judicial Circuit Court of South Dakota. Elected to a four-year term on that court in 1914, Sherwood resigned in 1917 to assume control of the law practice of his son, George F. Sherwood, following the son's enlistment in the U.S. Army during World War I. In 1921, Governor William H. McMaster appointed Sherwood to a seat on the South Dakota Supreme Court vacated by the death of Charles S. Whiting. Sherwood was elected to the seat in 1924, and served as presiding judge of the court in 1924 and 1929. He served until he resignation on January 1, 1931, after which he managed several farms that he owned, and maintained a limited legal practice.

Political offices
Preceded by Charles S. Whiting	Justice of the South Dakota Supreme Court; 1922–1931	Succeeded by E.D. Roberts
