= Dighton Corson =

American judge

The Honorable Dighton Corson
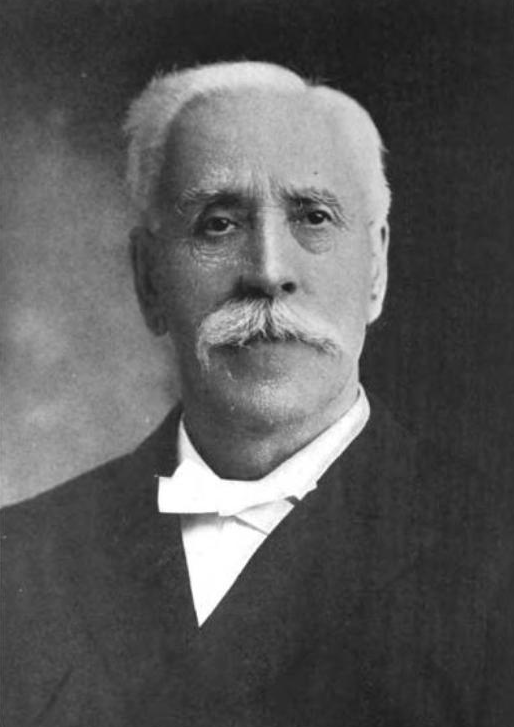

Justice of the South Dakota Supreme Court
- In office 1889–1913
- Preceded by: Position established
- Succeeded by: Samuel C. Polley

Member of the Wisconsin State Assembly from the Milwaukee 1st district
- In office January 4, 1858 – January 3, 1859
- Preceded by: Frederick K. Bartlett
- Succeeded by: Edwin Palmer

Personal details
- Born: October 21, 1827 Canaan, Maine, U.S.
- Died: May 7, 1915 (aged 87) Pierre, South Dakota, U.S.
- Resting place: Mount Muncie Cemetery, Lansing, Kansas
- Party: Republican; Democratic (before 1861)
- Spouse: Elizabeth Hoffman (m. 1882–1915)
- Children: Ralph E. Corson; (b. 1859; died 1925)
- Occupation: lawyer, politician
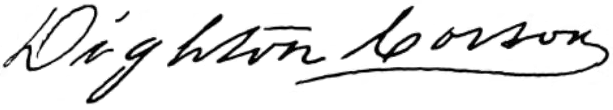
- Signature

Dighton Corson (October 21, 1827 – May 7, 1915) was an American lawyer, politician, and jurist, and was a pioneer of Wisconsin and South Dakota. He was one of the first justices of the South Dakota Supreme Court.

== Biography ==
On October 21, 1827, Dighton was born to Isaac and Nancy Corson in Canaan, Maine. He studied law and was admitted to the bar in 1853.

He would live in Milwaukee, Wisconsin, and Virginia City, Nevada, before eventually moving to South Dakota. Corson married Elizabeth Hoffman on May 22, 1882. On May 7, 1915, he died at his home in Pierre, South Dakota. Corson County, South Dakota is named for him.

On May 31, 1861, Corson and his family left New York City aboard the steamship North Star. On December 13, 1861, he was appointed as the first District Attorney for the First Judicial District of Nevada Territory.

== Career ==
Corson was a member of the Wisconsin State Assembly from 1857 to 1858. In 1859, he was District Attorney of Milwaukee County, Wisconsin. He was a delegate to the South Dakota State Constitutional Convention in 1885 and 1889 and would serve as a justice of the South Dakota Supreme Court from 1889 to 1913.

Wisconsin State Assembly
Preceded by Frederick K. Bartlett	Member of the Wisconsin State Assembly from the Milwaukee 1st district January 4, 1858 – January 3, 1859	Succeeded by Edwin Palmer
Legal offices
State government established	Justice of the South Dakota Supreme Court; 1889–1913	Succeeded by Samuel C. Polley
