= Jim Sutton (stock contractor) =

American stock contractor (1935–2026)

- Born: James Louverne Sutton Jr. April 20, 1935; Hughes County, South Dakota, U.S.
- Died: September 3, 2026 (aged 91)
- Education: South Dakota State University
- Occupation: Stock contractor
- Spouse: Julie Nelson (m. 1953)

James Louverne Sutton Jr. (April 20, 1935 – September 3, 2026) was an American stock contractor.

== Early life and career ==
Sutton was born in Hughes County, South Dakota, on April 20, 1935, the son of James Sutton Sr. and Flossie Nystrom. He was raised on his family's ranch, owned by his grandfather Edwin Sutton. He attended and graduated from Onida High School. After graduating, he played college basketball and rodeo at South Dakota State University, and earned his degree in animal husbandry. He served as a second lieutenant at the Reserve Officers' Training Corps at Fort Sill.

In 1968, Sutton and his father co-founded the Sutton Rodeo Company in South Dakota, and developed the breeding program. His company notably breed PRCA bucking horses. In 1978, he founded the Black Hills Stock Show and Rodeo in Rapid City, South Dakota, and in 1979, he served as a stock contractor for the National High School Rodeo at the Red River Valley in Fargo, South Dakota.

In 2020, Sutton was inducted into the ProRodeo Hall of Fame.

== Personal life and death ==
In 1953, Sutton married Julie Nelson. Their marriage lasted until Sutton's death in 2026.

Sutton died on September 3, 2026, at the age of 91.
