= Steven R. Jensen =

American judge (born 1963)

Steven Jensen

Chief Justice of the South Dakota Supreme Court
- Incumbent
- Assumed office January 5, 2021
- Preceded by: David Gilbertson

Associate Justice of the South Dakota Supreme Court
- Incumbent
- Assumed office November 3, 2017
- Appointed by: Dennis Daugaard
- Preceded by: Lori S. Wilbur

Personal details
- Born: March 18, 1963 (age 63)
- Education: Bethel University (BA); University of South Dakota (JD)

Steven R. Jensen (born March 18, 1963) is the chief justice of the South Dakota Supreme Court since 2021. He was appointed as an associate justice by Governor Dennis Daugaard in 2017. He became the 50th member of the court, succeeding Justice Lori S. Wilbur.

== Early life and education ==
Jensen, the son of Raymond and Dorsie Jensen, was raised on a homestead farm outside of Wakonda, South Dakota. Following his graduation from Wakonda High School. Jensen attended Bethel College in St. Paul, Minnesota, and graduated from there in 1985. During the summer of 1984, he worked as an intern for U.S. Senator Chuck Grassley. During his internship with Grassley, Jensen decided to switch his career path from farming to law. His Juris Doctor degree was conferred by the University of South Dakota in 1988.

== Career ==
Jensen served as a law clerk for Associate Justice Richard W. Sabers of the South Dakota Supreme Court. In 1989, he started working at the Crary Huff Law Firm in Sioux City, Iowa. Jensen practiced for 14 years in both South Dakota and Iowa, handling civil litigation. He was an attorney at Crary Huff until 2003. At that time he was appointed to the First Judicial Circuit Court of South Dakota by then-governor Mike Rounds, serving until 2014. He was Presiding Judge of that circuit from 2011 to 2014.

=== South Dakota Supreme Court ===
Jensen was appointed as an associate justice to the South Dakota Supreme Court in November 2017. In June 2020, it was announced that Jensen was selected to replace David Gilbertson as the next Chief Justice of the South Dakota Supreme Court by his colleagues. As Chief Justice, Jensen manages the operations of the state judicial system and its nearly 600 employees and $58 million operating budget. He assumed office in January 2021. In January 2025, it was announced that Jensen was reelected to a four-year term as Chief Justice by the Court.

As chief justice, Jensen has secured pay raises for court staff, including judges, and improved security practices at the state's 66 county courthouses. Jensen also established an Indigent Defense task force to improve the state public defense practices.

Jensen's professional affiliations include his service as chairman of the Unified Judicial System’s Presiding Judges Council and president of the South Dakota Judges Association. Jensen currently serves as the President-Elect of the Conference of Chief Justices and has served on the board of the National Center for State Courts since 2024.

=== Miller v Barnett ===
On April 28, 2021, the South Dakota Supreme Court heard arguments in Miller v Barnett, challenging Amendment A passed in the state in 2020, which legalized recreational and medical marijuana. The challengers argued that the Amendment violated the state's single-subject ballot measure provision and was a "revision" (which would require a constitutional convention) rather than an amendment.

Jensen wrote the 4-1 majority opinion for the court striking down Amendment A. In the opinion, he stated, "It is clear that Amendment A contains provisions embracing at least three separate subjects, each with distinct objects or purposes," referring to the topics of recreational marijuana, medical marijuana and hemp.

== Personal life ==
Jensen married Sue Nelson (sister of former South Dakota Secretary of State Chris Nelson) in 1990. They have one daughter, Rachel; two sons, Ryan and Andrew; and a son-in-law, Blake Roberts.

Legal offices
Preceded by Lori S. Wilbur	Associate Justice of the South Dakota Supreme Court; 2017–present	Incumbent
Preceded by David Gilbertson	Chief Justice of the South Dakota Supreme Court; 2021–present	Incumbent
