= St. Clair Smith =

American judge (1889–1988)

St. Clair Smith (July 10, 1889 – May 3, 1988) was a justice of the South Dakota Supreme Court from January 9, 1937, to December 1, 1962.

Born in Brown County, South Dakota, Smith received his law degree from the George Washington University Law School, and practiced in Aberdeen, South Dakota, from 1913 until his appointment to the bench.

Smith was initially appointed to the court, and was reelected in 1940, and every six years thereafter until his retirement.

Smith died at his home in Pierre, South Dakota, at the age of 98.

Political offices
Preceded by Dwight Campbell	Justice of the South Dakota Supreme Court; 1937–1962	Succeeded by Frederick Homeyer
