= John K. Konenkamp =

American judge

John K. Konenkamp (born October 20, 1944) is a retired justice of the South Dakota Supreme Court.

== Early life and education ==
Born in Brooklyn, N.Y., as the first of eight children born to Margaret and John Konenkamp. He attended private Catholic Schools throughout the duration of his childhood and adolescence. In his early teen years, his family moved to Macon, Georgia. Konenkamp graduated from the University of Georgia in 1967, served for four years in the United States Navy where he met Geri his wife to be, a Navy Nurse, and following that, attended the University of South Dakota School of Law. He graduated with a Juris Doctor degree in 1974.

== Career ==
He served as Deputy State's Attorney for Rapid City, South Dakota through 1977, then entered private practice. Konenkamp and his wife served for several years as foster parents for the South Dakota Department of Social Services.

== Judicial service ==
In 1984 South Dakota Governor Bill Janklow appointed Konenkamp a circuit court judge. He became presiding judge of the seventh circuit in 1988. In 1994 Governor Walter Dale Miller appointed him to the state supreme court. He was retained in retention elections in 1998 and again in 2006. Among the judicial law clerks that worked under him include Gregory J. Stoltenburg.
