= David Gilbertson =

American judge

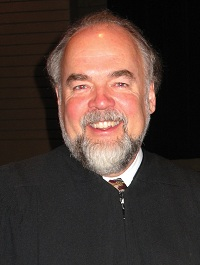

Chief Justice of the South Dakota Supreme Court
- In office September 15, 2001 – January 5, 2021
- Preceded by: Robert Miller
- Succeeded by: Steven R. Jensen

Associate Justice of the South Dakota Supreme Court
- In office April 13, 1995 – January 5, 2021
- Appointed by: Bill Janklow
- Preceded by: Rudy Henderson
- Succeeded by: Scott P. Myren

Personal details
- Born: October 29, 1949 (age 76)
- Party: Democratic
- Spouse: Deborah Gilbertson
- Children: 4
- Education: South Dakota State University (BS); University of South Dakota (JD)

David Gilbertson (born October 29, 1949) is the former chief justice of the South Dakota Supreme Court.

== Early life and education ==
Gilbertson attended South Dakota State University, graduating in 1972 with a Bachelor of Science in Geography. He then graduated from the University of South Dakota School of Law in 1975. He did not take the bar exam as he was admitted to the South Dakota bar under diploma privilege.

== Career ==
Gilbertson established a private practice in Sisseton, South Dakota and simultaneously served as Roberts County Deputy State's Attorney and City Attorney for Sisseton.

== State judicial service ==
In 1986 Governor Bill Janklow appointed him circuit judge of the Fifth Judicial Circuit. Janklow appointed Gilbertson an Associate Justice of the South Dakota Supreme Court April 3, 1995. He was retained by the voters for successive eight-year terms in 1998, 2006, and 2014.

When Chief Justice Robert A. Miller retired in 2001, Gilbertson was elected chief justice of the court. In 2009 Gilbertson was reelected to his third 4-year term as chief justice.

Gilberston retired upon reaching mandatory retirement age upon the completion of his current term on January 5, 2021.

Legal offices
Preceded by Rudy Henderson	Justice of the South Dakota Supreme Court; 1995–2021	Succeeded by Scott P. Myren
Preceded by Robert A. Miller	Chief Justice of the South Dakota Supreme Court; 2001–2021	Succeeded by Steven R. Jensen
