= Diploma privilege =

Method for licensing lawyers in the United States

In the United States, the diploma privilege is a method for lawyers to be admitted to the bar (i.e. authorized to practice law) without taking a bar examination. Wisconsin is the only jurisdiction that currently allows diploma privilege as an alternative to the bar examination. In 2026, the New Mexico Supreme Court approved an approximately 6 month skills-based pathway in lieu of taking and passing the bar exam.

In 25 states, attorneys who were initially admitted to practice by another state's diploma privilege are eligible for admission to the state bar on motion of the admission committee.

== History ==
Diploma privilege arose as a method for admission to the bar along with the rise of law schools in the United States. Prior to the 1870s, most aspiring lawyers trained through apprenticeships under a lawyer or a judge, a practice called "reading law". In the 1870s, law schools began to emerge across the country as an alternative form of legal education. To incentivize aspiring lawyers to attend law schools, many states offered "diploma privilege" to graduates of law schools, wherein they would receive automatic admission to the bar. This practice reached its peak between 1879 and 1917.

The practice of diploma privilege declined in favor of formal, written bar examinations from the late 1910s onward. The privilege was abolished in California in 1917. In 1921, the American Bar Association formally expressed opposition to diploma privilege. By 1948, only 9 states maintained diploma privilege. The most recent states to abolish diploma privilege and require law school graduates to sit for a bar examination were Mississippi in 1981, Montana and South Dakota in 1983, and West Virginia in 1988.

As of 2024, Wisconsin is the only state that allows graduates of in-state law schools to gain admission to the bar through diploma privilege rather than a bar examination. New Hampshire does not have diploma privilege, but its only law school has an alternative licensing program called the Daniel Webster Honors Program that allows a limited number of students who have completed certain curricula and a separate exam to bypass the regular bar exam. Iowa considered reinstating diploma privilege in 2014.

== Present ==
=== Diploma privilege in Wisconsin ===
In Wisconsin, J.D. graduates of the two American Bar Association-accredited law schools in the state, Marquette University Law School and the University of Wisconsin Law School, may seek admission to the State Bar of Wisconsin without having to sit for a bar examination. LLM and SJD graduates of these law schools are not eligible for diploma privilege.

The diploma privilege in Wisconsin dates to 1870, when it was passed by the Wisconsin State Legislature in the same legislation that established the University of Wisconsin Law School. At that time a law department was established in the State University and a course of study under able instructors was prescribed for students in the law department. The 1870 law provided that graduates of this department should be entitled to admission to the bar upon their certificate of graduation—that is, their law degree. It was offered to encourage future lawyers to get a formal legal education instead of simply "reading law," which was the typical legal training of the time.

Graduates of out-of-state law schools, even if they are Wisconsin residents, must still take the Wisconsin bar exam to be admitted in Wisconsin. Likewise, graduates of Wisconsin law schools must take the bar exam in many other states in which they are going to practice. A number of U.S. states do not grant reciprocal admission for attorneys who obtained their bar admission through the diploma privilege, requiring those attorneys to take that state's bar exam, regardless of the length of that attorney's practice. The policy reasoning behind diploma privilege is to incentivize Wisconsin residents to attend in-state law schools and to keep Wisconsin residents working in-state. Another policy consideration is preventing "brain drain" in Wisconsin. This theory holds that without the diploma privilege, the smartest from the state will leave Wisconsin for their education or for their career, specifically to nearby Chicago (the Iowa Bar Association cited similar territorial concerns). Another advantage is that state of Wisconsin subsidizes in-state resident tuition for law students, and therefore incentivizes them to stay to retain the state's educational investment. It is also claimed that the diploma privilege helps keep youth in Wisconsin.

In Wiesmueller v. Kosobucki, a class action lawsuit certified in the United States District Court for the Western District of Wisconsin in June 2008, the petitioners asserted that the state's policy discriminates against interstate commerce in violation of the Commerce Clause because it affords a diploma privilege in lieu of a bar examination only to lawyers graduating from Wisconsin's law schools. The suit sought injunctive relief to expand the privilege to all applicants to the Wisconsin Bar who obtain a J.D. from any law school accredited by the American Bar Association. The district court subsequently dismissed the case for failure to state a cause of action. On July 9, 2009, the Seventh Circuit reversed the district court's dismissal of the case, saying "we find ourselves in an evidentiary vacuum created by the early termination of the case," and remanded the case to the district court.

== Future ==
=== Planned licensure pathway in New Mexico ===
In 2026, the New Mexico Supreme Court created a new pathway for becoming an attorney that did not require taking and passing the bar exam, expected to begin in 2027.

== Former ==
=== Diploma privilege during the COVID-19 pandemic ===
There was a renewed interest in diploma privilege as an alternative to the bar examination, which is generally administered in large conference rooms and auditoriums every July and February, in light of the COVID-19 pandemic. On March 22, 2020, several legal scholars who study licensure identified "emergency diploma privilege" as an alternative that showed "considerable promise" in a working paper discussing how states may continue to license new lawyers during the COVID-19 pandemic. The National Conference of Bar Examiners (NCBE), which writes the Uniform Bar Exam (UBE), came out in opposition of diploma privilege in a white paper in which it argued that bar exams ensure lawyer competency. Several legal news outlets criticized the NCBE's position, noting that the NCBE has a conflict of interest as the developer of the UBE and that the NCBE's President and CEO, Judith Gundersen, is a recipient of diploma privilege herself. A number of petitions for emergency diploma privilege by law school deans, professors, and recent graduates in other states grew during this time. Organizations like United for Diploma Privilege hosted webinars and organized recent graduates to circulate similar petitions in over 30 states.

On March 27, New York became the first state to announce the postponement of its July 2020 bar examination as a result of the COVID-19 pandemic. Several states and territories followed suit by postponing their exams to August, September, or October, while others looked for alternative options to an in-person examination, including remote examinations or offering diploma privilege to qualified individuals. 39 jurisdictions postponed or canceled their July bar examinations, with postponed exams taking place in September, October, or other dates and at least 25 jurisdictions offered remotely-administered examinations.

On April 21, Utah became the first state to grant temporary, emergency diploma privilege during the COVID-19 pandemic. Afterwards, Washington, Oregon, Louisiana, and the District of Columbia have all instituted temporary diploma privilege policies, as detailed in the table below. However, some Washington legal employers told recent graduates that they would not recognize diploma privilege and wanted them to sit for the test regardless. In the District of Columbia, candidates who chose the diploma privilege option rather than taking the bar examination were required to be supervised for three years by a qualified attorney admitted to the D.C. bar. On July 6, New York State Senator Brad Hoylman introduced legislation to provide 2020 graduates with diploma privilege.

Temporary provision of diploma privilege during the COVID-19 pandemic
Jurisdiction	Date announced	Eligibility requirements	Responsible authority
Utah	April 21, 2020	Registered for the July 2020 bar exam.; Graduated from an ABA-accredited law school with a first-time bar passage rate at or above 86%.	Utah Supreme Court
Washington (Note: Option offered between diploma privilege and in-person September examination.)	June 12, 2020	Registered for the July 2020 bar exam (which had been postponed to September).; Graduated from an ABA-accredited law school.	Washington Supreme Court
Oregon	June 29, 2020	Registered for the July 2020 bar exam.; Graduated from an ABA-accredited law school with a first-time bar passage rate at or above 86%.	Oregon Supreme Court
Louisiana	July 22, 2020	Registered for the July or October 2020 bar exams.; Graduated from an ABA-accredited law school.; Had not previously sat for any other bar exam in another state.; By the end of 2021, had to complete 25 hours of continuing legal education and a mentoring program.	Louisiana Supreme Court
District of Columbia (Note: Option offered between diploma privilege and online October examination.)	September 24, 2020	Registered for the 2020 or 2021 bar exams.; Graduated from an ABA-accredited law school in 2019 or 2020.; Had not previously sat for any bar exam or had a bar application denied.; Passed the Multistate Professional Responsibility Exam.; Required to be directly supervised while practicing for three years by a qualified attorney.	District of Columbia Court of Appeals
