= Frederick A. Warren =

American judge (c. 1878–1944)

Frederick A. Warren (c. 1878 – June 18, 1944) was a justice of the South Dakota Supreme Court from January 1931 to June 18, 1944.

Warren ran for a seat on the state high court in 1930, against incumbent Justice James Brown. Although the November 1930 election returns initially showed Warren losing by 83 votes, Warren sought a recount which was concluded in January 1931, and led to Warren being declared the winner by 254 votes out of nearly 127,000 cast.

Warren remained on the court until his death from a heart attack at the age of 66. He died while reading his mail at home in Pierre, South Dakota, having previously gone to church and his office that day.

Political offices
| Preceded by James Brown | Justice of the South Dakota Supreme Court; 1931–1944 | Succeeded by Vernon R. Sickel |
