= Francis G. Dunn =

American judge

Francis G. Dunn was a justice of the South Dakota Supreme Court from 1973 to September 7, 1985, serving as Chief Justice from 1974 to 1978.

== Career ==
Dunn was a lawyer in Madison and Sioux Falls. He served as municipal judge of Sioux Falls until Governor Ralph Herseth appointed him as the state's eleventh circuit judge. In 1973, Dunn became a justice of the South Dakota Supreme Court, succeeding Charles S. Hanson, representing the Second district.
