= De Grey, South Dakota =

Unincorporated community in South Dakota, U.S.

Coordinates: 44°17′09″N 99°55′04″W

De Grey is an unincorporated community in Hughes County, in the U.S. state of South Dakota.

== History ==
A post office called De Grey was established in 1886, and remained in operation until 1955. The community was named in honor of Charles DeGrey, a pioneer settler.
