= South Dakota Circuit Courts =

South Dakota Circuit Courts are the state courts within the state of South Dakota.

== Structure of the court ==
There are seven judicial circuits and 38 circuit judges, who are elected by the voters of the district in non-partisan elections to eight-year terms or appointed by the Governor when there is a vacancy. The Chief Justice of the Supreme Court of South Dakota appoints one judge in each circuit to act as the presiding circuit judge. Presiding judges supervise and administer operations within each circuits.

== Jurisdiction of the court ==
The circuit courts are the trial courts of general jurisdiction in the Unified Judicial System of South Dakota. The courts have original jurisdiction in all criminal and civil cases.

They have exclusive jurisdiction in trials concerning felony cases, civil cases with an amount in controversy in excess of $10,000, as well as appellate jurisdiction over appeals from magistrate courts and administrative agencies.
