= List of University of South Dakota School of Law people =

This is a list of prominent alumni and faculty of the University of South Dakota School of Law.

== Academia ==
James W. Abbott	J.D. 1974	president of the University of South Dakota 1997–present
Harvey Jewett	J.D. 1973	president of South Dakota Board of Regents

== Attorneys general ==
Sigurd Anderson	L.L.B. 1937	17th attorney general of South Dakota
Clarence C. Caldwell	L.L.B. 1906	9th attorney general of South Dakota
Frank Farrar	L.L.B. 1953	22nd attorney general of South Dakota
Marty Jackley	J.D. 1995	current 30th attorney general of South Dakota; petitioner in South Dakota v. Wayfair, Inc.
William Janklow	J.D. 1966	25th attorney general of South Dakota; petitioner in South Dakota v. Opperman and Reeves, Inc. v. Stake
Royal Johnson	L.L.B. 1906	8th attorney general of South Dakota
Larry Long	J.D. 1972	29th attorney general of South Dakota, judge of 2nd Circuit Court of South Dakota
George Mickelson	L.L.B. 1927	16th attorney general of South Dakota
Albert C. Miller	L.L.B.	21st attorney general of South Dakota
Gordon Mydland	L.L.B. 1948	23rd attorney general of South Dakota
Kermit Sande	J.D. 1968	24th attorney general of South Dakota
Merrel Sharpe	L.L.B. 1914	12th attorney general of South Dakota

== Business ==
Roswell Bottum	L.L.B. 1924	chief counsel for Reconstruction Finance Corporation
Frank Farrar	L.L.B. 1953	founder, owner, and chairman of First Savings Bank
Harvey C. Jewett IV	J.D. 1973	CEO of Super 8 Motels and heir to Jewett fortune
Steve T. Kirby	J.D. 1975	co-founder of Bluestem Capital
Joe Robbie	L.L.B. 1946	founder-owner of the Miami Dolphins, 1966–1990

== Governors and lieutenant governors ==
Sigurd Anderson	L.L.B. 1937	19th governor of South Dakota
Joseph H. Bottum	L.L.B. 1927	27th lieutenant governor of South Dakota, and presiding judge of the Fifth Circuit Court of South Dakota
Frank L. Farrar	L.L.B. 1953	24th governor of South Dakota
John T. Grigsby	L.L.B. 1903	lieutenant governor of South Dakota and member of the prominent Kingsbury family
William J. Janklow	J.D. 1966	27th and 30th governor of South Dakota
Leslie Jensen	L.L.B. 1921	15th governor of South Dakota
Steve Kirby	J.D. 1975	lieutenant governor of South Dakota
Matt Michels	J.D. 1985	current lieutenant governor of South Dakota, 2011–present
George S. Mickelson	J.D. 1965	28th governor of South Dakota
George T. Mickelson	L.L.B. 1927	18th governor of South Dakota and 1952 U.S. presidential candidate
Lem Overpeck	L.L.B. 1936	lieutenant governor of South Dakota
Merrell Q. Sharpe	L.L.B. 1914	17th governor of South Dakota

== State supreme court justices ==
Francis G. Dunn	L.L.B. 1937	chief justice, South Dakota Supreme Court
David Gilbertson	J.D. 1975	current chief justice, South Dakota Supreme Court
Daryl Hecht	J.D. 1977	current justice, Iowa Supreme Court
Frank Henderson	L.L.B. 1952	justice, South Dakota Supreme Court
Steven R. Jensen	J.D. 1988	current justice, South Dakota Supreme Court
John K. Konenkamp	J.D. 1974	justice, South Dakota Supreme Court
Boyd Leedom	L.L.B. 1955	justice, South Dakota Supreme Court
Judith Meierhenry	J.D. 1977	justice, South Dakota Supreme Court
Robert A. Miller	J.D. 1963	chief justice, South Dakota Supreme Court
Donald J. Porter	L.L.B. 1943	justice, South Dakota Supreme Court
Richard W. Sabers	J.D. 1963	justice, South Dakota Supreme Court
Mark Salter	J.D. 1993	current justice, South Dakota Supreme Court
Glen A. Severson	J.D. 1975	justice, South Dakota Supreme Court
Lori S. Wilbur	J.D. 1977	justice, South Dakota Supreme Court
Roger L. Wollman	J.D. 1962	justice, South Dakota Supreme Court
Steven L. Zinter	J.D. 1975	current justice, South Dakota Supreme Court

== United States district attorneys ==
William F. Clayton	L.L.B. 1951	30th U.S. attorney, District of South Dakota
Philip N. Hogen	J.D. 1970	34th U.S. attorney, District of South Dakota, commissioner of National Indian Gaming Commission
Marty Jackley	J.D. 1995	39th U.S. attorney, District of South Dakota
Ted McBride	J.D. 1978	37th U.S. attorney, District of South Dakota
James E. McMahon	J.D. 1977	38th U.S. attorney, District of South Dakota
Ron A. Parsons Jr.	J.D. 1997	current 42nd U.S. attorney, District of South Dakota 2018–present
Randy Seiler	J.D. 1980	41st U.S. attorney, District of South Dakota
Jeff Viken	J.D. 1977	33rd U.S. attorney, District of South Dakota

== United States District Court ==
Richard Battey	L.L.B. 1953	chief judge, U.S. District Court for the District of South Dakota, presiding judge of "Sue" dinosaur case
Andrew Wendell Bogue	L.L.B. 1947	chief judge, U.S. District Court for the District of South Dakota
John Bailey Jones	L.L.B. 1953	chief judge, U.S. District Court for the District of South Dakota
George Theodore Mickelson	L.L.B. 1927	chief judge, United States District Court for the District of South Dakota
Fred Joseph Nichol	L.L.B. 1936	chief judge, U.S. District Court of for the District of South Dakota
Lawrence Leroy Piersol	J.D. 1965	chief judge, U.S. District Court for the District of South Dakota
Donald J. Porter	L.L.B. 1943	chief judge, U.S. District Court for the District of South Dakota
Jeffrey Lynn Viken	J.D. 1977	current chief judge, U.S. District Court for the District of South Dakota, 2013–present

== United States Court of Appeals ==
Roger Leland Wollman	J.D. 1962	chief judge, United States Court of Appeals for the Eighth Circuit

== United States House of Representatives ==
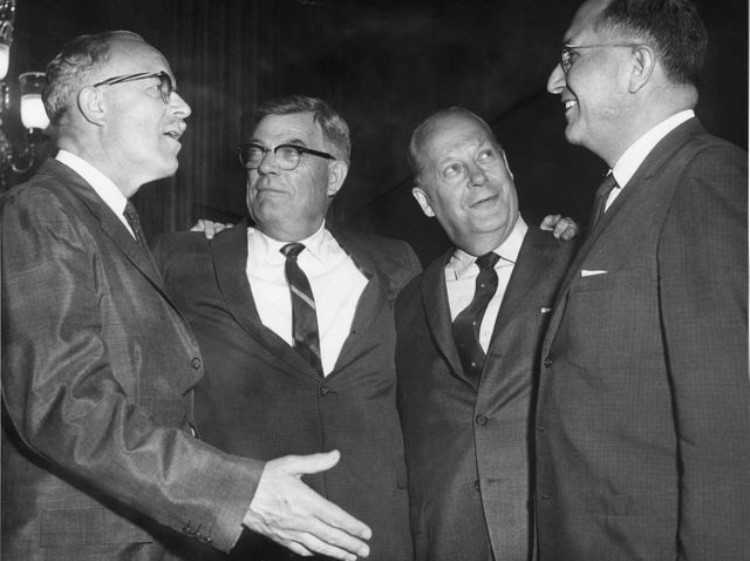
U.S. congressional delegation from South Dakota for the 87th United States Congress contained three alumni from the class of 1927: E.Y. Berry, Joseph H. Bottum, and Harold Lovre.

James Abourezk	J.D. 1966	32nd U.S. representative, author of the Indian Child Welfare Act, and first Lebanese-American member of Congress
Ellis Yarnal Berry	L.L.B. 1927	28th U.S. representative from South Dakota
Frank E. Denholm	L.L.B. 1959	31st U.S. representative from South Dakota
Bill Janklow	J.D. 1966	39th U.S. representative from South Dakota
Royal Cleaves Johnson	L.L.B. 1906	19th U.S. representative from South Dakota, and highly decorated WWI veteran while he was a member of Congress
Tim Johnson	J.D. 1975	U.S. representative from South Dakota
Harold Lovre	L.L.B. 1927	27th U.S. representative from South Dakota
William Williamson	L.L.B. 1905	22nd U.S. representative from South Dakota

== United States Tax Court ==
Diane Kroupa	J.D. 1981	judge, United States Tax Court and chief judge, Minnesota Tax Court

== United States Senate ==
James Abourezk	J.D. 1966	21st U.S. senator from South Dakota; first Arab-American member of Congress
Joseph H. Bottum	L.L.B. 1927	19th U.S. senator from South Dakota
Tim Johnson	J.D. 1975	25th U.S. senator from South Dakota

== United States military ==
George E. "Bud" Day	L.L.B. 1949	U.S. colonel, Medal of Honor recipient, most highly decorated military officer since Douglas MacArthur, and POW cell-mate with John McCain
Leslie Jensen	L.L.B. 1921	U.S. colonel in Pacific Theater of WWII
Royal C. Johnson	L.L.B. 1906	U.S. lieutenant, Distinguished Service Cross recipient and Croix de Guerre with gold star from the Republic of France
Gregory J. Stoltenburg	J.D. 1995	U.S. lt. colonel and current presiding judge of the Third Circuit Court of South Dakota, 2015–present

== State legislature ==
- Roswell Bottum (1924), member of South Dakota House of Representatives
- Joni Cutler, member of South Dakota House of Representatives
- Ervin E. Dupper, member of South Dakota Senate
- Marc Feinstein (1995), member of South Dakota House of Representatives
- Margaret V. Gillespie, member of South Dakota House of Representatives
- Brian Gosch (1996), current majority leader and former speaker of the House of South Dakota House of Representatives
- Donald A. Haggar, member of South Dakota House of Representatives
- Anne Hajek, member of South Dakota House of Representatives
- Scott Heidepriem (1980), minority leader of South Dakota Senate
- Roger W. Hunt, member of South Dakota House of Representatives
- Timothy Johns, member of South Dakota House of Representatives
- Craig Kennedy, member of South Dakota Senate
- David Lust (1997), majority leader of South Dakota House of Representatives
- Lance Russell (2000), member of South Dakota House of Representatives
- Mike Stevens, member of South Dakota House of Representatives
- Ron J. Volesky, member of South Dakota Senate
- William Garner Waddel (1904), member of South Dakota Senate

== Tribal, sovereign, foreign courts ==
- Creighton Leland Robertson (1976), chief judge of the Sisseton Wapheton Oyate Reservation Tribal Court

== Noted faculty ==
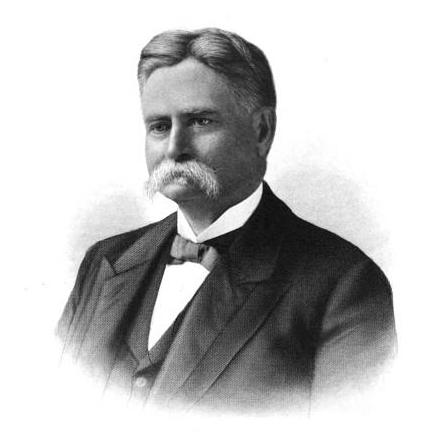
Bartlett Tripp

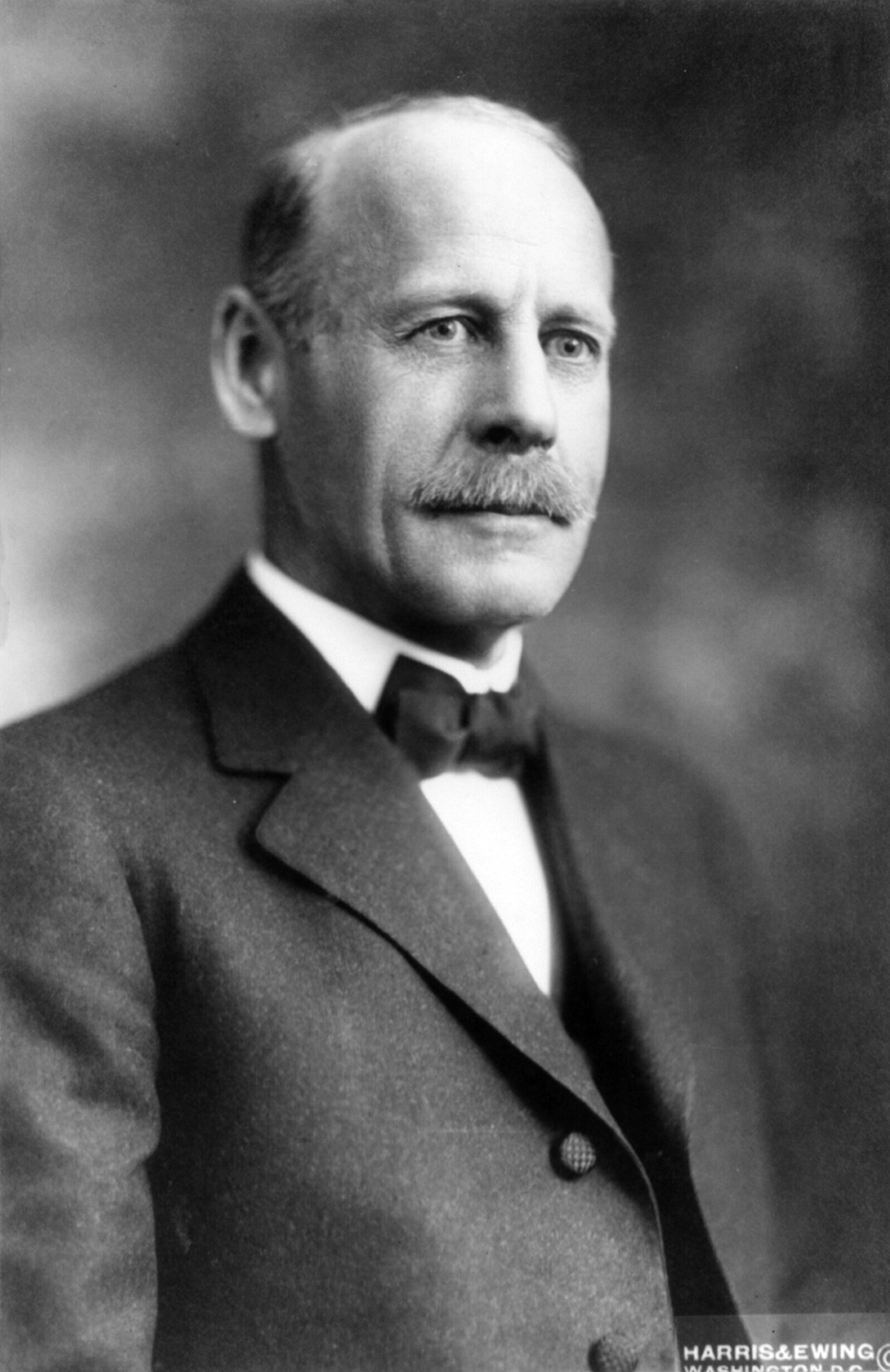
Thomas Sterling

=== Current ===
- Patrick Garry, constitutional law professor
- Brendan Johnson, adjunct law professor and former U.S. attorney for the District of South Dakota
- Frank Pommersheim, American Indian Law professor, Camden 28 member, chief judge for the Cheyenne River Sioux Tribal Court of Appeals, and chief justice of the Rosebud Sioux Supreme Court

=== Former ===
- Roger Baron, professor of Law, ERISA scholar, and counsel in Sereboff v. Mid Atlantic Medical Services, Inc
- Charles Hall Dillon, professor of Law, U.S. representative from South Dakota and associate justice of the South Dakota Supreme Court; namesake of Dillon Lecture Series
- Ralph E. Erickson, 5th dean of the College of Law and 11th deputy attorney general of the United States during the Nixon Administration
- Thomas Sterling, 1st dean of the College of Law and U.S. senator from South Dakota; namesake of Sterling Honors
- Bartlett Tripp, 1st professor of Law, 25th U.S. ambassador to Austria, last chief justice of Dakota Territory Supreme Court, and first president of the South Dakota Bar Association

== See also ==
- South Dakota Attorney General
- South Dakota Supreme Court
- United States Attorney for the District of South Dakota
