= University of South Dakota School of Law =

Public law school in Vermillion, South Dakota, US

University of South Dakota Knudson School of Law
- Coat of Arms of the School of Law
- Motto: Veritas (Latin for Truth)
- Parent school: University of South Dakota
- Established: 1901; 125 years ago
- School type: Public law school
- Parent endowment: $401.5 million
- Dean: Neil Fulton
- Location: Vermillion, South Dakota, U.S. 42°47′11″N 96°55′39″W
- Enrollment: 168 J.D. candidates
- Faculty: 20
- USNWR ranking: 122nd (tie) (2026)
- Bar pass rate: 82.8%
- Website: www.usd.edu/law
- ABA profile: University of South Dakota School of Law Profile

The University of South Dakota School of Law also known as University of South Dakota Knudson School of Law or USD Law in Vermillion, South Dakota, United States, is a professional school of the University of South Dakota and the only law school in the state of South Dakota. It was established in 1901 by U.S. Ambassador Bartlett Tripp and U.S. Senator Thomas Sterling. The law school is home to approximately 168 students and has more than 3,000 alumni. With 168 J.D. candidates, it is currently the second-smallest law school and smallest public law school student population among the American Bar Association accredited law schools.

The University of South Dakota School of Law has produced 8 Governors of South Dakota, including as well as many judges of the South Dakota Supreme Court and the U.S. District Court for the District of South Dakota, 13 members of the U.S. Congress, 19 Attorneys General of South Dakota, 14 U.S. Attorneys for the District of South Dakota, as well as other key figures important to the development of the state, earning it the nickname "the Alma Mater of the State."

== History ==
Law School Founders

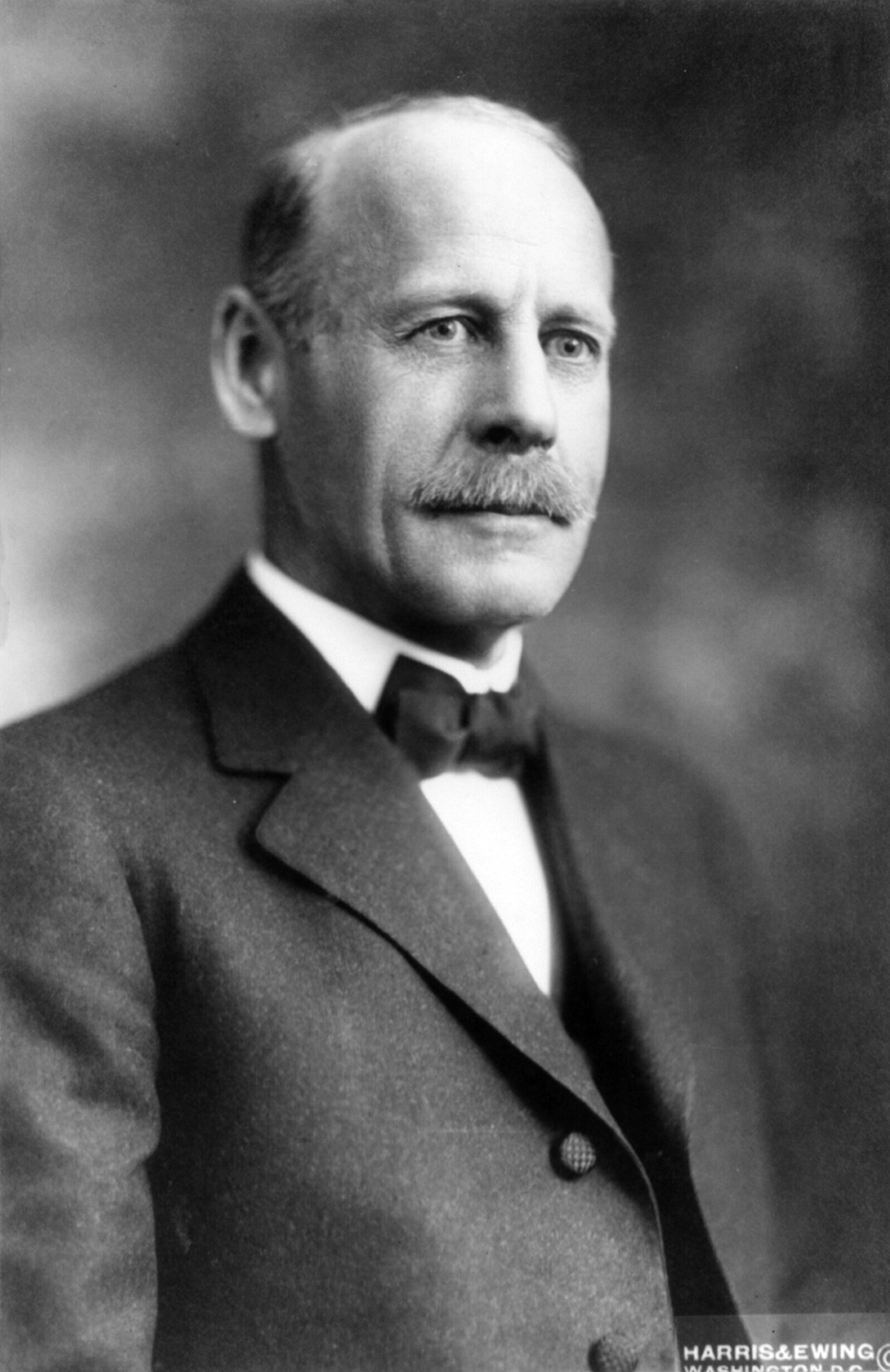
U.S. Senator
Thomas Sterling

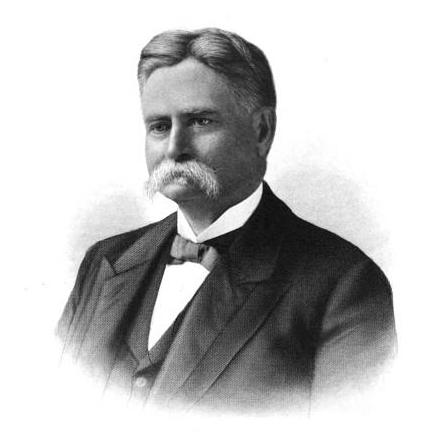
U.S. Ambassador
Bartlett Tripp

Sterling served as school's first dean from 1901-1911. Tripp served as the first professor until his death in 1911.

=== 1901–1911 (The Sterling Years) ===
The University of South Dakota College of Law was founded in 1901. Thomas Sterling served as the law school's first dean until 1911 when he left to become the third U.S. Senator from South Dakota. During the Sterling years, the law school proved successful in developing attorneys for the new state. In fact, by the time Sterling was in Congress, two of his earliest graduates William Williamson and Royal C. Johnson were Congressmen themselves. Before Sterling and the College of Law, the few lawyers there were, came from eastern states or read law for admission into the bar.

Along with Sterling, U.S. Ambassador to Austria Bartlett Tripp was an integral part of establishing the school. Tripp was returning to South Dakota from his diplomatic post in Austria at the turn of the century. Tripp had been initially considered to be the running mate of President William McKinley, his friend and Albany Law School classmate, but was overlooked in lieu of then-Governor of New York Teddy Roosevelt. With no other political opportunities left to him, Tripp devoted his full attention to establishing the College of Law. He played many roles in the law school, not only was he the school's first taxation and constitutional law professor but he had served as President of the first bar association, the Constitutional Convention of South Dakota & the commission to codify South Dakota's laws, as well as the last Chief Justice of the Dakota Territory Supreme Court. Tripp and his son-in-law Charles Hall Dillon, a fellow professor, provided much of the law library's contents and upon Tripp's death donated much of his estate to the College of Law. It is speculated that had William McKinley not overlooked him for Vice President of the United States the College of Law may not have been founded as soon as it was. Thomas Sterling's 1911 departure was partly led by the death of his friend and colleague Bartlett Tripp.

=== 1911–1984 ===
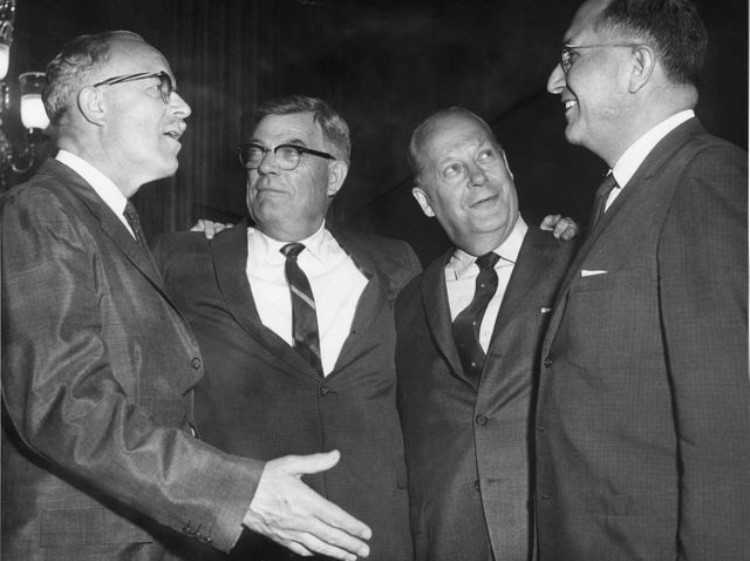
U.S. congressional delegation from South Dakota for the 87th Congress contained three alumni from the class of 1927: Rep. E.Y. Berry, Sen. Joseph Bottum, and Rep. Harold Lovre.

In 1911, Marshall McKusick became the school's second and subsequent longest-serving dean, serving until his death in 1950. The 1927 class proved to be one of the strongest classes in USD Law history, producing Frank Biegelmeier, George T. Mickelson, E.Y. Berry, Joseph Bottum, and Harold Lovre. A stronger class did not come until 1975, when USD Law produced Steven L. Zinter, David Gilbertson, Glen A. Severson, Steve T. Kirby, and Tim Johnson. In 1982, the College of Law moved from its then-82-year-old building to a new building and was renamed the 'School of Law'. During this period the law school was led by the 11th Deputy Attorney General of the United States from the Nixon Administration, Ralph E. Erickson.

=== 1984–2016 ===
In 1984, the South Dakota Supreme Court abolished the nearly century-old practice of diploma privilege, which previously admitted School of Law graduates into South Dakota bar without examination. Also in 1984, Camden 28 member and Indian Law scholar Frank Pommersheim joined the faculty. From 1993 until 2011 Barry Vickrey, a Vanderbilt law alumnus, served as Dean of the School of Law. During Vickrey's tenure, noted federalist professor Patrick Garry joined the faculty in 2003. Former CEO of the Mayo Clinic, Mike Myers served on the faculty as an elder law professor. Myers, known for his eccentric behavior, resigned in 2012 and ran for Governor of South Dakota in the next election. In 2013, Thomas Earl Geu, a University of Nebraska College of Law alumnus, was hired from his previous position of interim dean into full dean.

=== 2016–present ===
In June 2017, George "Mark" Mickelson, son and grandson of alumnus George S. Mickelson and George T. Mickelson chaired the USD Law Task Force to determine if the location of the School of Law should be moved to Sioux Falls, South Dakota. The USD Law Task Force voted 8–5 to keep the School of Law in Vermilion, South Dakota, but would develop non-degree programs there. On March 20, 2018, Thomas Geu announced his intentions to resign as dean of the School of Law. Neil Fulton, the Federal Public Defender for the District of South Dakota and District of North Dakota, became the new dean of the School of Law.

On May 15, 2020, the council of the American Bar Association's Section of Legal Education and Admissions to the Bar met remotely and determined this school and nine others had significant noncompliance with Standard 316. This Standard was revised in 2019 to provide that at least 75% of an accredited law school's graduates who took a bar exam must pass one within two years of graduation. The school was asked to submit a report by Feb. 1, 2021; and, if the council did not find the report demonstrated compliance, the school would be asked to appear before the council at its May, 2021 meeting. On February 26, 2021, the ABA’s council posted that the school was now in compliance with the standard.

== Demographics and rankings ==
Admission is competitive; for the class entering in the fall of 2010, 220 out of 449 J.D. applicants were offered admission (48.9%), with 75 matriculating. They came from 46 colleges and 14 states. 58% percent were South Dakota residents, 42% were female, and 9% minorities. The 25th, 50th, and 75th percentile LSAT scores and GPAs for the class were 150/153/156 and 3.18/3.44/3.73 respectively. The 2026 U.S. News & World Report law school rankings placed South Dakota at 122nd of the law schools in the U.S. In 2013, The National Jurist listed South Dakota Law in the top 5 schools for "Best Value." In 2013, The National Law Journal listed South Dakota Law #5 for employment in the government and Public Interest sector, as the law school alumni populates many of the prominent government positions within the state.

University of South Dakota School of Law is accredited by the American Bar Association and is a member of the Association of American Law Schools. According to South Dakota's official 2013 ABA-required disclosures, 60.6% of the Class of 2013 obtained full-time, long-term, JD-required employment nine months after graduation, making it the best in the region with the exception of the University of Minnesota Law School. Within the state of South Dakota, it is widely regarded as the most historically significant and venerable educational institution due to its long-time role of producing most of the lawyers of the state.

== Notable faculty ==
=== Current ===
- Patrick Garry, constitutional law professor
- Brendan Johnson, adjunct law professor and former U.S. Attorney for the District of South Dakota
- Myanna Dellinger, law professor and international relations specialist
- Neil Fulton, current dean and former federal public defender for United States Court of Appeals for the Eighth Circuit and chief of staff to Governor Mike Rounds

=== Former ===
- Thomas Sterling, 1st Dean of the College of Law and U.S. Senator from South Dakota. Namesake of Sterling Honors.
- Bartlett Tripp, 1st Professor of Law, 25th U.S. Ambassador to Austria, last Chief Justice of Dakota Territory Supreme Court, and first president of the South Dakota Bar Association.
- Ralph E. Erickson, 5th Dean of the College of Law and 11th Deputy Attorney General of the United States during the Nixon Administration.
- Charles Hall Dillon, Professor of Law, U.S. Representative from South Dakota and Associate Justice of the South Dakota Supreme Court. Namesake of the Dillon Lecture Series.
- Roger Baron, Professor of Law, ERISA scholar, and counsel in Sereboff v. Mid Atlantic Medical Services, Inc.
- Mike Myers, Professor of Law, CEO of Mayo Clinic, and candidate for Governor of South Dakota.
- Frank Pommersheim, American Indian Law Professor, Camden 28 member, Chief Judge for the Cheyenne River Sioux Tribal Court of Appeals and the Chief Justice of the Rosebud Sioux Supreme Court

== Notable alumni ==
The University of South Dakota School of Law has historically produced a number of noted alumni among which include eight governors, thirteen members of the U.S. congressional delegation from South Dakota, nineteen state attorneys general, thirteen U.S. Attorneys, twenty-nine state supreme court justices, and twelve federal judges including the Chief Judge of the U.S. Court of Appeals for the Eighth Circuit, Roger Leland Wollman and the Chief Judge of the U.S. District Court for the District of South Dakota, Jeffrey L. Viken.

Notable School of Law alumni include:

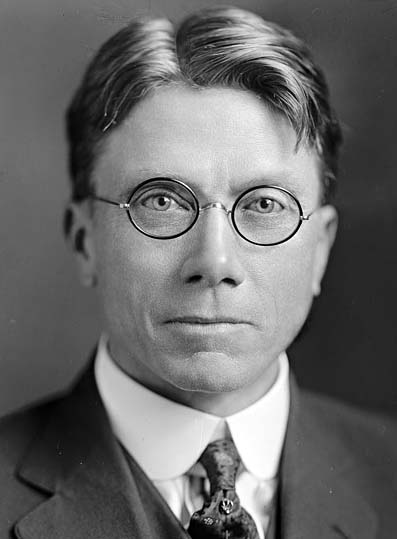
William Williamson
L.L.B. 1905
U.S. Representative from South Dakota

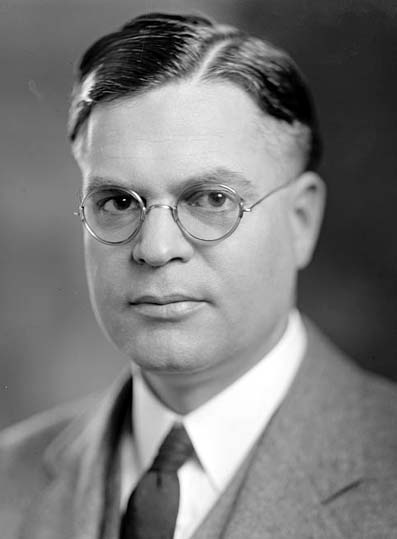
Royal C. Johnson
L.L.B. 1906
U.S. Representative from South Dakota,
8th Attorney General of South Dakota,
Most highly decorated member of Congress

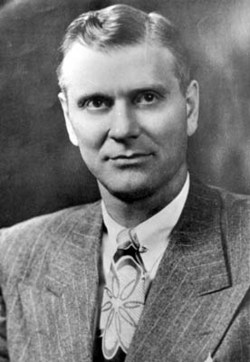
George T. Mickelson
L.L.B. 1927
Chief Judge U.S. District Court for the District of South Dakota,
18th Governor of South Dakota,
16th Attorney General of South Dakota

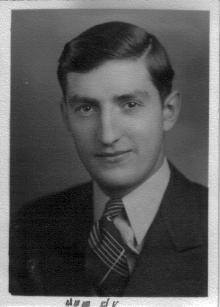
Joe Robbie
L.L.B 1947
Founder-owner of the Miami Dolphins,
2x Super Bowl Champion.

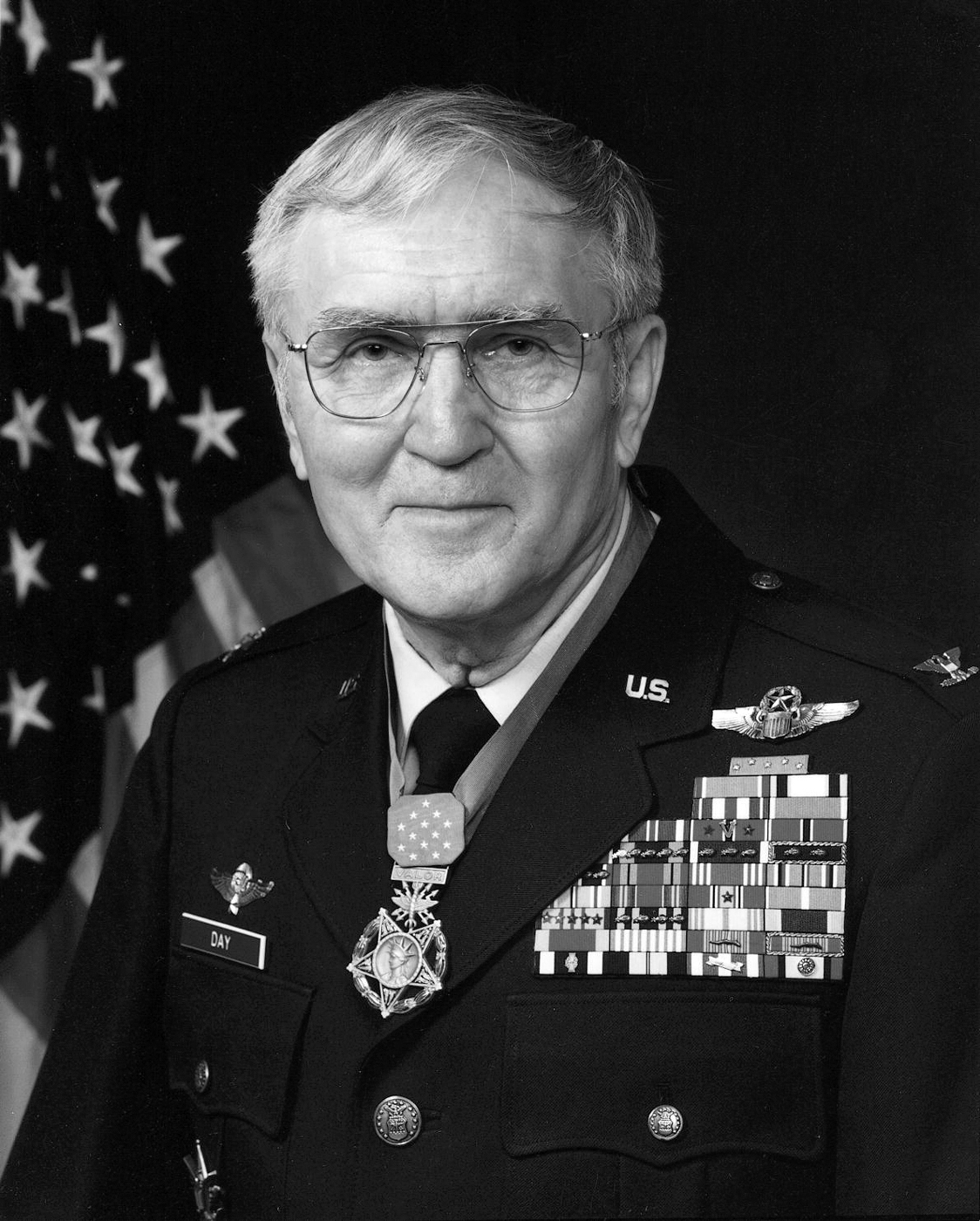
Bud Day
L.L.B. 1949
Medal of Honor recipient,
Most highly decorated U.S. Military officer in modern history.

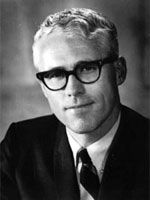
Frank Farrar
L.L.B. 1953
24th Governor of South Dakota & 22nd Attorney General of South Dakota

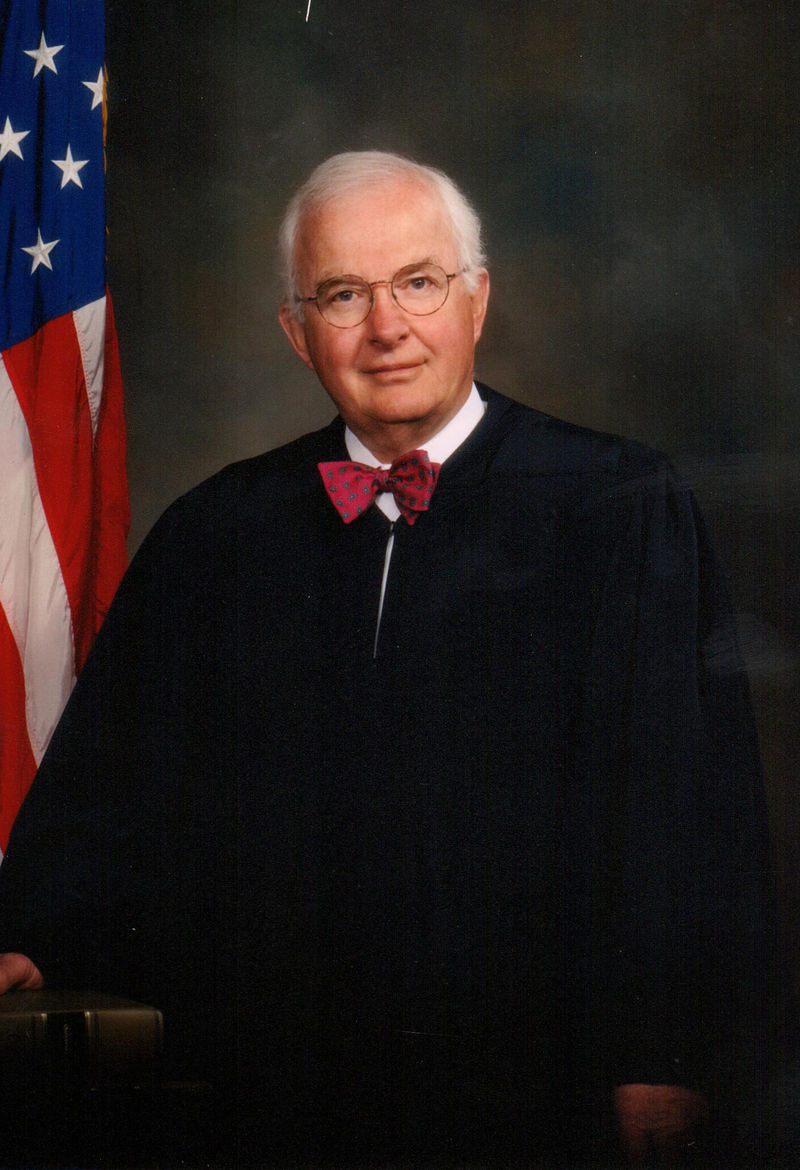
Richard Battey
L.L.B. 1953
Chief Judge, U.S. District Court for the District of South Dakota

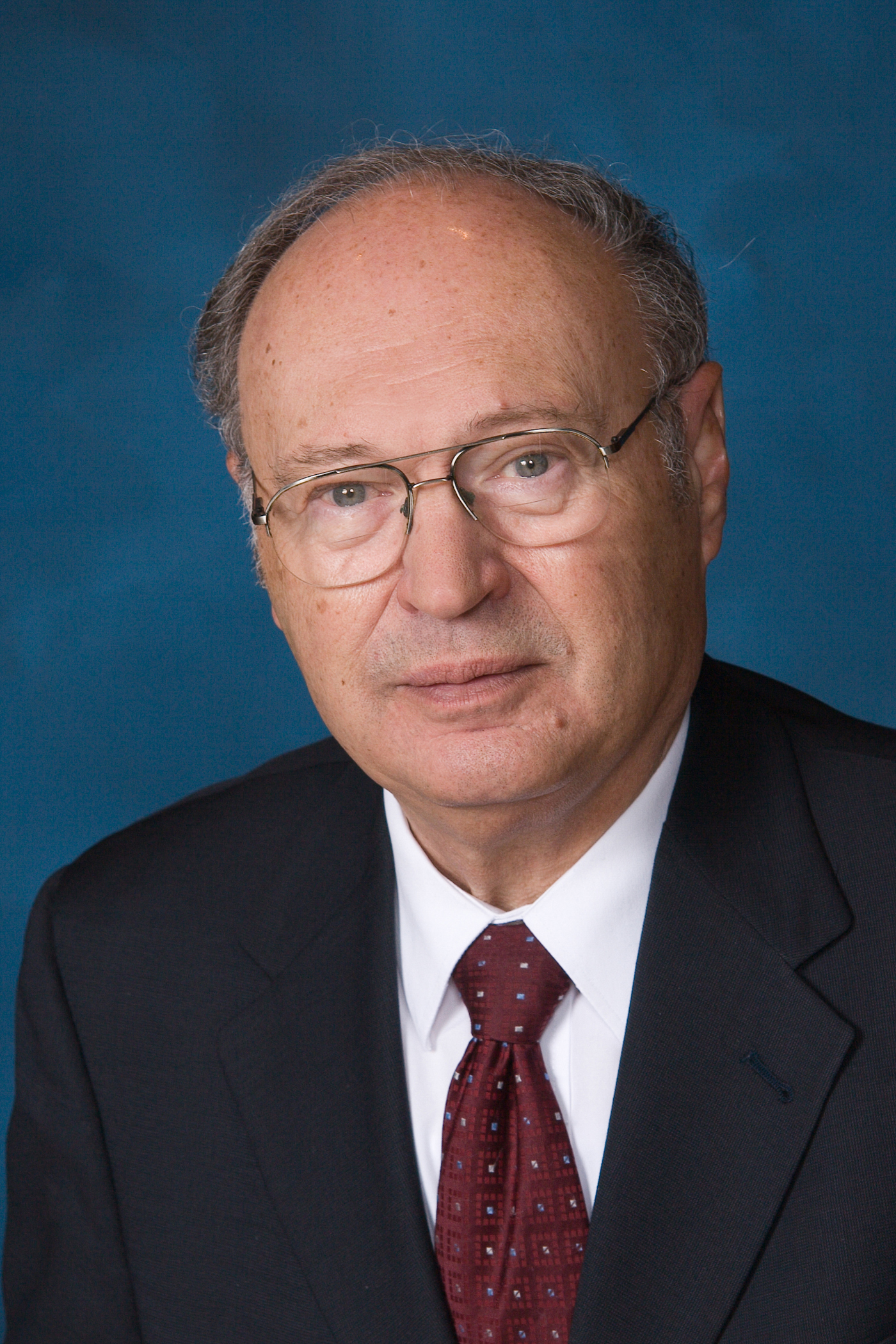
Roger Leland Wollman
J.D. 1962
Chief Judge, U.S. Court of Appeals for the Eighth Circuit,
4th Chief Justice, South Dakota Supreme Court

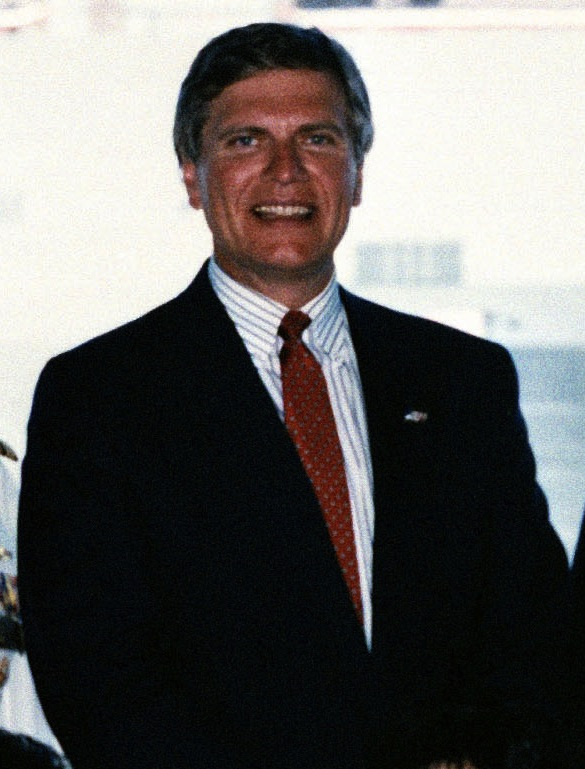
George S. Mickelson
J.D. 1965
28th Governor of South Dakota

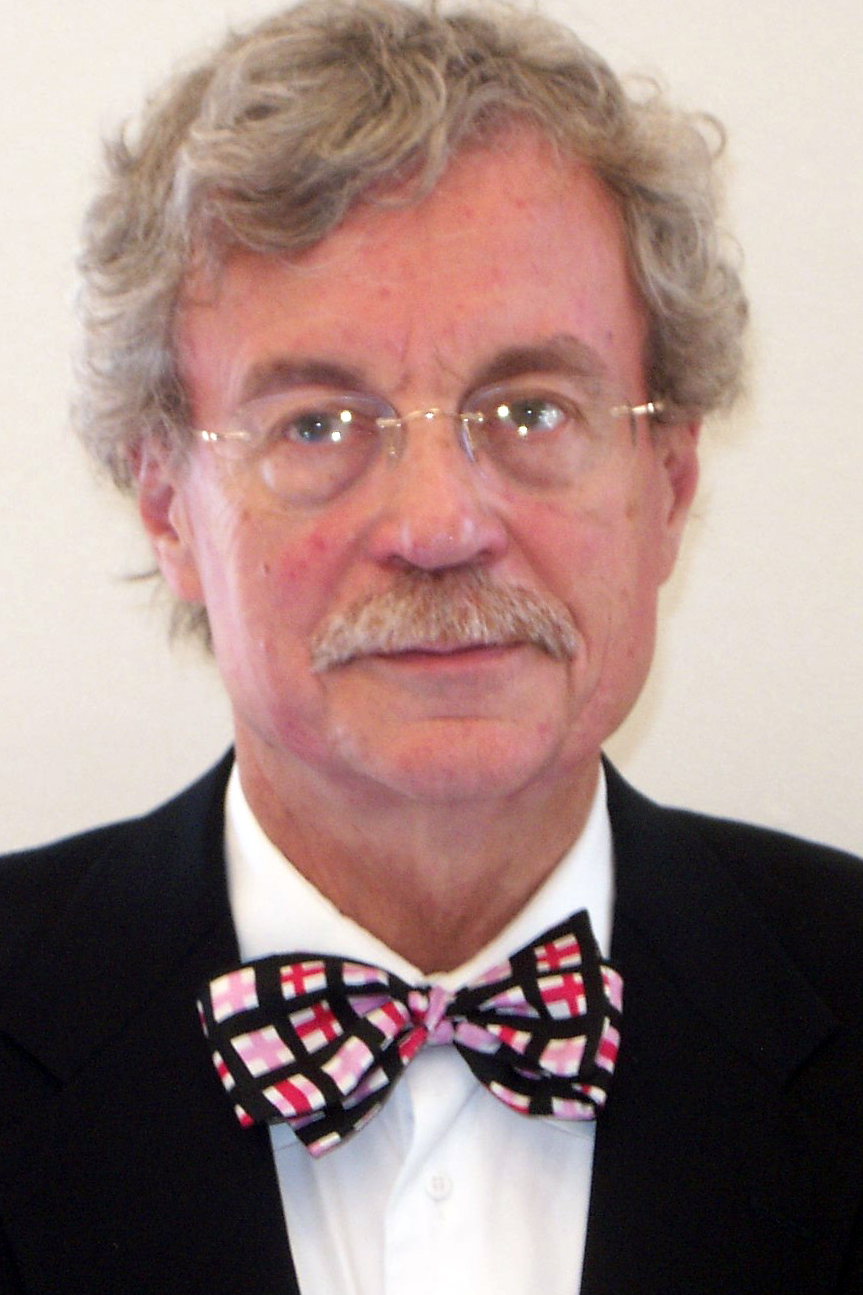
Lawrence Piersol
J.D. 1965
Chief Judge, U.S. District Court for the District of South Dakota

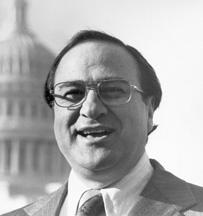
James Abourezk
J.D. 1966
U.S. Senator & U.S. Representative from South Dakota, First Arab-American member of Congress,
Author, Indian Child Welfare Act.

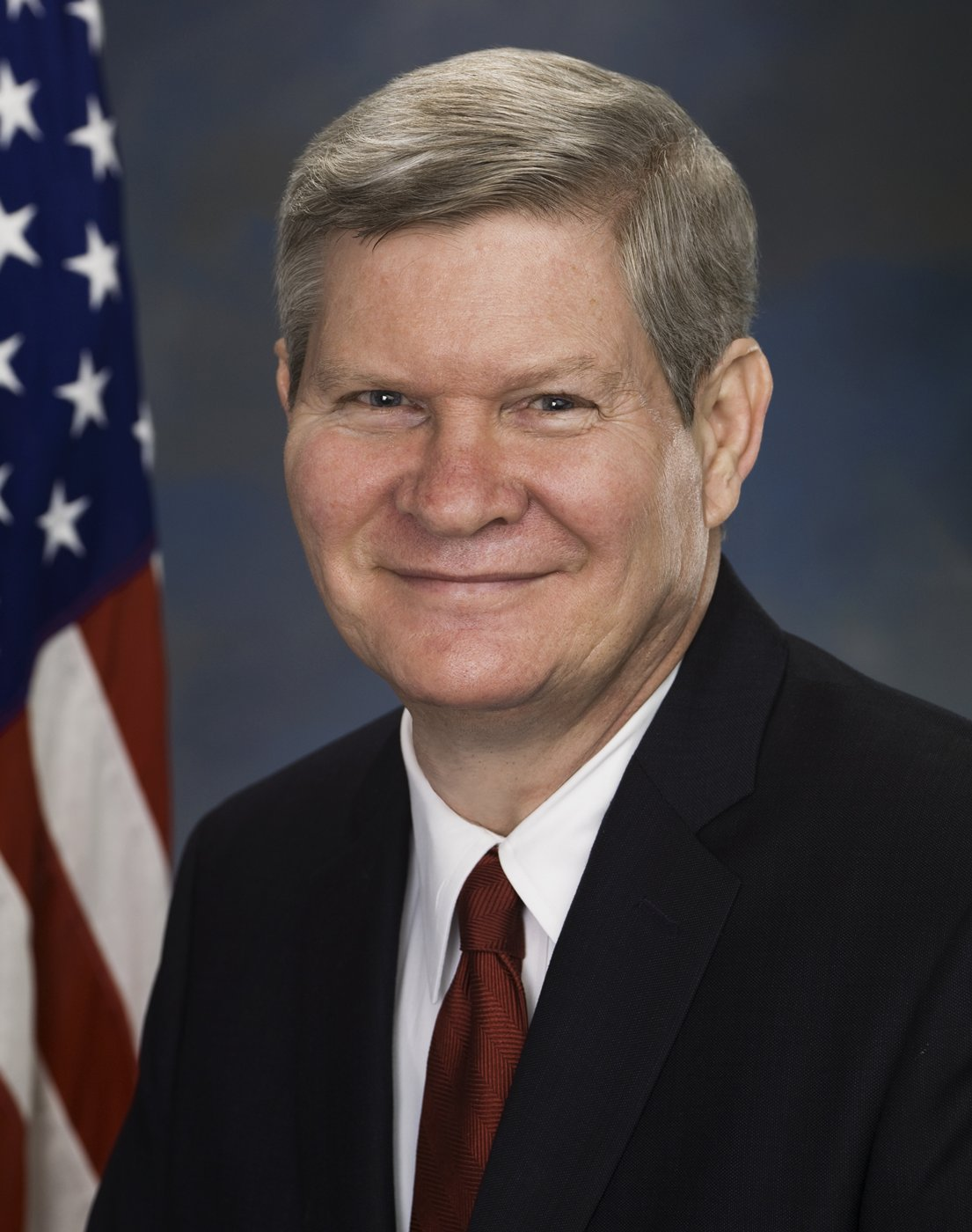
Tim Johnson
J.D. 1975
U.S. Senator,
U.S. Representative from South Dakota

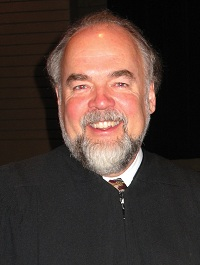
David Gilbertson
J.D. 1975
9th Chief Justice, South Dakota Supreme Court

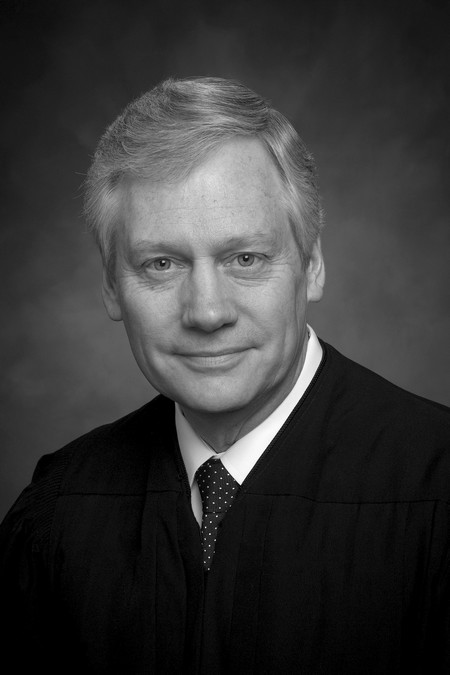
Jeffrey L. Viken
J.D. 1977
Chief Judge, U.S. District Court for the District of South Dakota

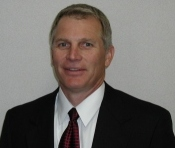
James E. McMahon
J.D. 1977
38th U.S. Attorney for the District of South Dakota

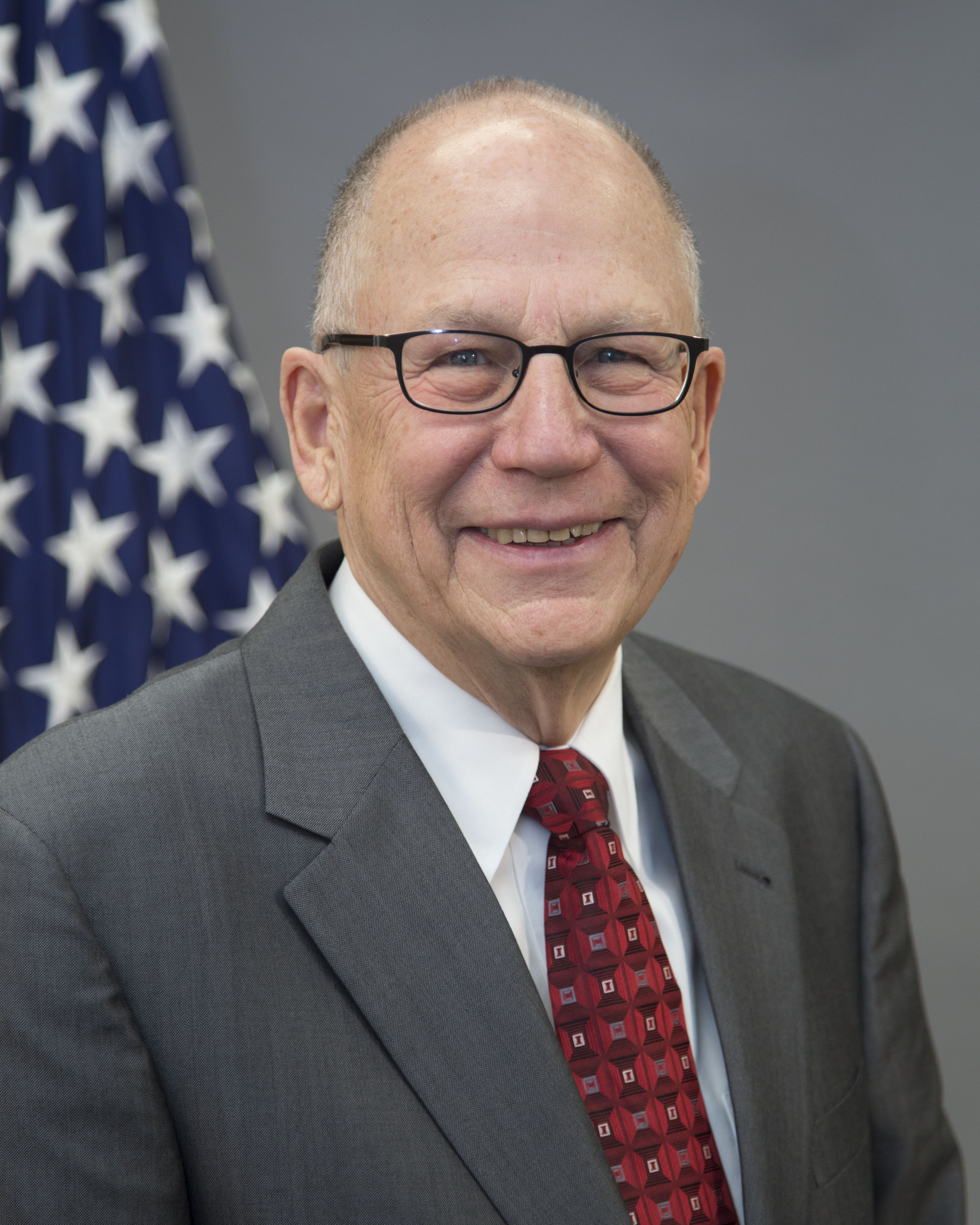
Randy Seiler
J.D. 1980
41st U.S. Attorney for the District of South Dakota

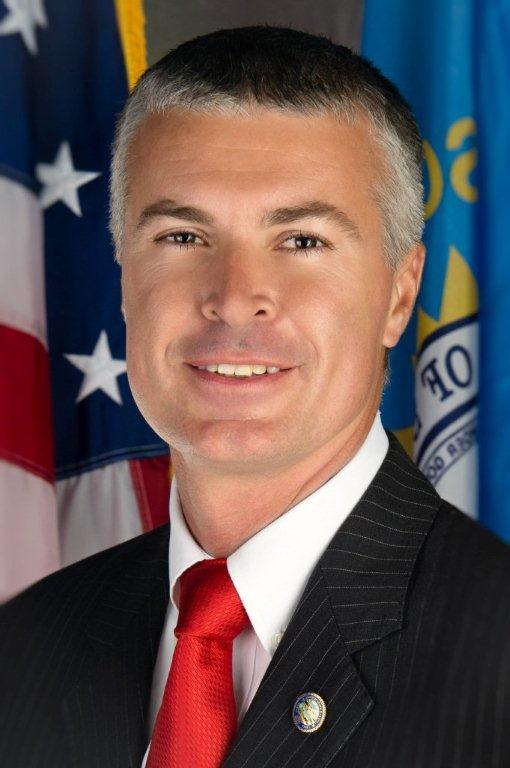
Marty Jackley
J.D. 1995
30th Attorney General of South Dakota,
39th U.S. Attorney for the District of South Dakota

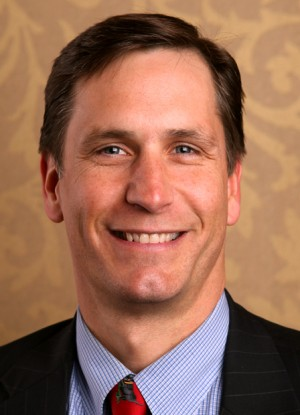
David Lust
J.D. 1997
Majority Leader of the South Dakota House of Representatives

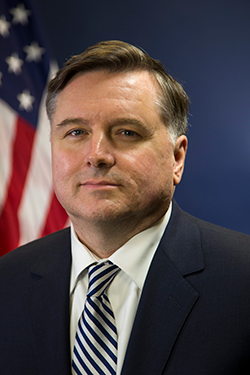
Ron A. Parsons Jr.
J.D. 1997
U.S. Attorney for the District of South Dakota

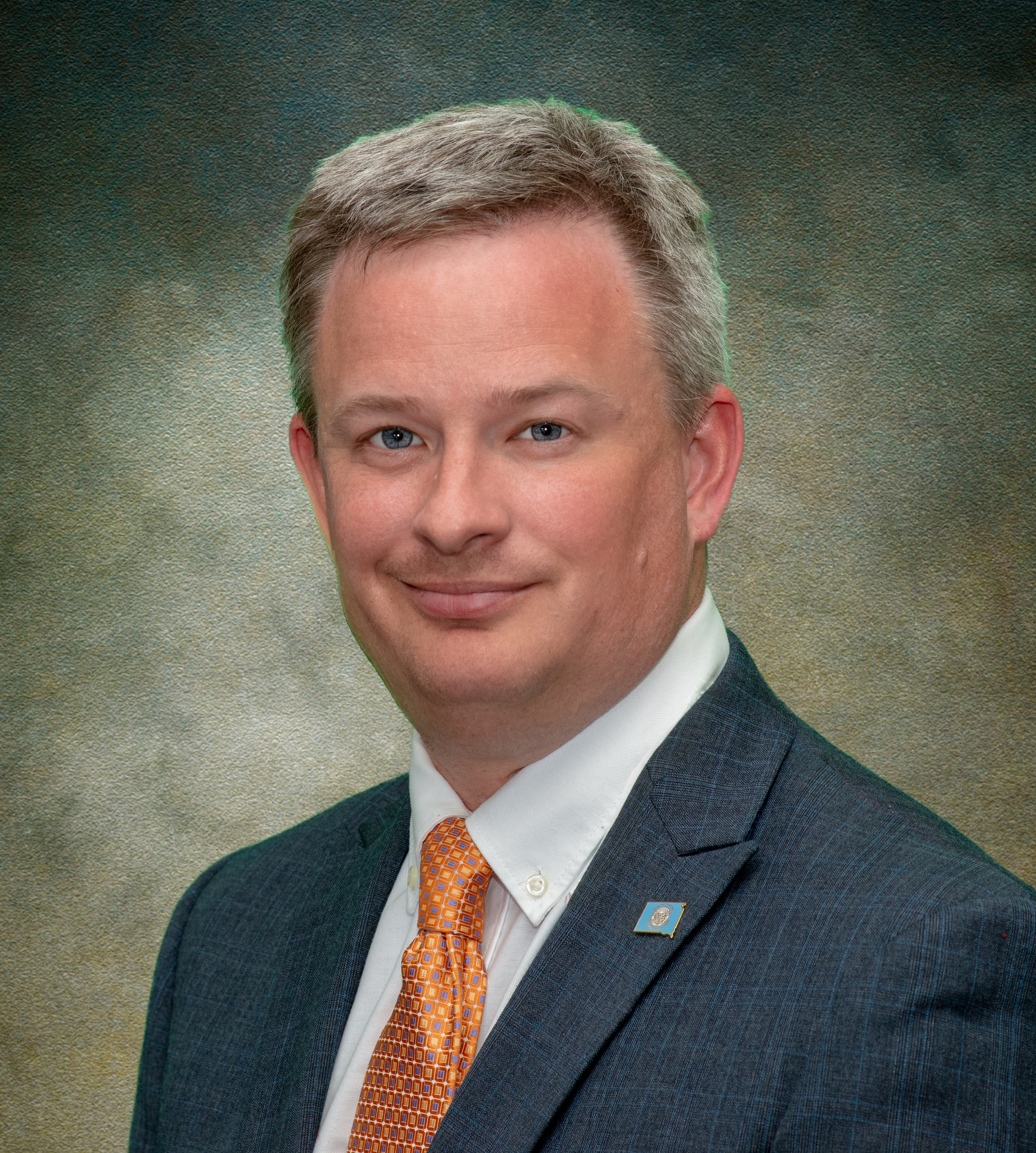
Jason Ravnsborg
J.D. 2001
Attorney General of South Dakota

== Academia ==
James W. Abbott	J.D. 1974	President of the University of South Dakota 1997–2018.
Harvey Jewett	J.D. 1973	President of South Dakota Board of Regents 1997–2017

== Attorneys General ==
Royal Johnson	L.L.B. 1906	8th Attorney General of South Dakota
Clarence C. Caldwell	L.L.B. 1906	9th Attorney General of South Dakota.
Buell F. Jones	L.L.B.	11th Attorney General of South Dakota.
Merrel Sharpe	L.L.B. 1914	12th Attorney General of South Dakota.
D. Walter Conway	L.L.B.	13th Attorney General of South Dakota.
George Mickelson	L.L.B. 1927	16th Attorney General of South Dakota.
Sigurd Anderson	L.L.B. 1937	17th Attorney General of South Dakota.
Parnell J. Donahue	L.L.B. 1938	20th Attorney General of South Dakota.
Albert C. Miller	L.L.B.	21st Attorney General of South Dakota.
Frank Farrar	L.L.B. 1953	22nd Attorney General of South Dakota.
Gordon Mydland	L.L.B. 1948	23rd Attorney General of South Dakota.
Kermit Sande	J.D. 1968	24th Attorney General of South Dakota.
William Janklow	J.D. 1966	25th Attorney General of South Dakota and petitioner in South Dakota v. Opperman and Reeves, Inc. v. Stake.
Mark V. Meierhenry	J.D. 1970	26th Attorney General of South Dakota and petitioner in Solem v. Helm and Solem v. Bartlett.
Roger Tellinghuisen	J.D. 1978	27th Attorney General of South Dakota and petitioner in South Dakota v. Dole.
Mark Barnett	J.D. 1978	28th Attorney General of South Dakota and petitioner in South Dakota v. Bourland.
Larry Long	J.D. 1972	29th Attorney General of South Dakota, Judge of 2nd Circuit Court of South Dakota.
Marty Jackley	J.D. 1995	30th Attorney General of South Dakota and petitioner in South Dakota v. Wayfair, Inc.
Jason Ravnsborg	J.D. 2001	31st Attorney General of South Dakota.

== Business ==
Roswell Bottum	L.L.B. 1924	chief counsel to Reconstruction Finance Corporation
Joe Robbie	L.L.B. 1946	founder-owner of the Miami Dolphins, 1966–1990.
Frank Farrar	L.L.B. 1953	founder, owner, and chairman of First Savings Bank.
Mike Myers	J.D. 1967	CEO of Mayo Clinic and board director of Minnesota Blue Cross Blue Shield
Harvey C. Jewett IV	J.D. 1973	CEO of Super 8 Motels
John Porter	J.D. 1974	CEO of Avera Health.
Steve T. Kirby	J.D. 1975	co-founder of Bluestem Capital.
Ross Dupper	J.D. 1982	President & CEO of Porsche North America, Inc.

== Governors and Lieutenant Governors ==
John T. Grigsby	L.L.B 1903	Lieutenant Governor of South Dakota and member of the prominent Kingsbury family.
Leslie Jensen	L.L.B. 1921	15th Governor of South Dakota
Merrell Q. Sharpe	L.L.B. 1914	17th Governor of South Dakota.
George T. Mickelson	L.L.B. 1927	18th Governor of South Dakota and 1952 U.S. Presidential Candidate
Albert C. Miller	L.L.B. 1924	22nd Lieutenant Governor of South Dakota
Joseph H. Bottum	L.L.B. 1927	27th Lieutenant Governor of South Dakota, and presiding Judge of the Fifth Circuit Court of South Dakota.
Lem Overpeck	L.L.B. 1936	29th Lieutenant Governor of South Dakota.
Sigurd Anderson	L.L.B. 1937	19th Governor of South Dakota.
Frank L. Farrar	L.L.B. 1953	24th Governor of South Dakota.
George S. Mickelson	J.D. 1965	28th Governor of South Dakota.
William J. Janklow	J.D. 1966	27th and 30th Governor of South Dakota.
Steve Kirby	J.D. 1975	35th Lieutenant Governor of South Dakota.
Matt Michels	J.D. 1985	38th Lieutenant Governor of South Dakota.

== State Court of Appeals Judges ==
Daryl Hecht	J.D. 1977	Judge, Iowa Court of Appeals.

== State Supreme Court Justices ==
Charles R. Hayes	L.L.B.	Justice, South Dakota Supreme Court.
Charles R. Hanson	L.L.B.	Justice, South Dakota Supreme Court.
James M. Doyle	L.L.B.	Justice, South Dakota Supreme Court.
Fred R. Winans	L.L.B.	Justice, South Dakota Supreme Court.
Jon Fosheim	L.L.B. 1943	Chief Justice, South Dakota Supreme Court.
Frank Biegelmeier	L.L.B. 1927	Justice, South Dakota Supreme Court.
Alex Rentto	L.L.B. 1933	Justice, South Dakota Supreme Court.
Francis G. Dunn	L.L.B. 1937	Chief Justice, South Dakota Supreme Court.
Fred J. Homeyer	L.L.B. 1942	Justice, South Dakota Supreme Court.
Donald J. Porter	L.L.B. 1943	Justice, South Dakota Supreme Court.
George W. Wuest	L.L.B. 1949	Chief Justice, South Dakota Supreme Court.
Robert E. Morgan	L.L.B. 1950	Justice, South Dakota Supreme Court.
Oren P. Coler	L.L.B. 1952	Justice, South Dakota Supreme Court.
Frank Henderson	L.L.B. 1952	Justice, South Dakota Supreme Court.
Boyd Leedom	L.L.B. 1955	Justice, South Dakota Supreme Court.
Roger Leland Wollman	J.D. 1962	Justice, South Dakota Supreme Court.
Richard W. Sabers	J.D. 1963	Justice, South Dakota Supreme Court.
Robert A. Miller	J.D. 1963	Chief Justice, South Dakota Supreme Court.
Laurence J. Zastrow	J.D. 1970	Justice, South Dakota Supreme Court.
John K. Konenkamp	J.D. 1974	Justice, South Dakota Supreme Court.
Steven L. Zinter	J.D. 1975	current Justice, South Dakota Supreme Court.
David Gilbertson	J.D. 1975	current Chief Justice, South Dakota Supreme Court.
Glen A. Severson	J.D. 1975	Justice, South Dakota Supreme Court.
Lori S. Wilbur	J.D. 1977	Justice, South Dakota Supreme Court.
Judith Meierhenry	J.D. 1977	Justice, South Dakota Supreme Court.
Daryl Hecht	J.D. 1977	Justice, Iowa Supreme Court.
Steven R. Jensen	J.D. 1988	current Justice, South Dakota Supreme Court.
Douglas Bahr	J.D. 1990	current Justice, North Dakota Supreme Court.
Mark Salter	J.D. 1993	current Justice, South Dakota Supreme Court.

== United States Attorneys ==
George Barnes Grigsby	L.L.B.	U.S. Attorney for the District of Alaska under the T. Roosevelt Administration.
Leo P. Flynn	L.L.B. 1934	27th U.S. Attorney for the District of South Dakota under the Truman Administration.
Clinton G. Richards	L.L.B. 1928	28th U.S. Attorney, District of South Dakota under the Eisenhower Administration.
Harold C. Doyle	L.L.B. 1951	29th U.S. Attorney, District of South Dakota under the Kennedy Administration.
William F. Clayton	L.L.B. 1951	30th U.S. Attorney, District of South Dakota under the Nixon Administration.
David V. Vrooman	L.L.B. 1956	31st U.S. Attorney, District of South Dakota under the Carter Administration.
Robert D. Hiaring	J.D. 1968	32nd U.S. Attorney, District of South Dakota.
Jeff Viken	J.D. 1977	33rd U.S. Attorney, District of South Dakota.
Philip N. Hogen	J.D. 1970	34th U.S. Attorney, District of South Dakota, Commissioner of National Indian Gaming Commission.
Ted McBride	J.D. 1978	37th U.S. Attorney, District of South Dakota under the Clinton Administration.
James E. McMahon	J.D. 1977	38th U.S. Attorney, District of South Dakota under the Bush Administration.
Marty Jackley	J.D. 1995	39th U.S. Attorney, District of South Dakota.
Randy Seiler	J.D. 1980	41st U.S. Attorney, District of South Dakota under the Obama Administration and first Trump Administration.
Ron A. Parsons Jr.	J.D. 1997	42nd U.S. Attorney, District of South Dakota under the first Trump Administration.

== United States District Court ==
George Theodore Mickelson	L.L.B. 1927	Judge, United States District Court for the District of South Dakota.
Fred Joseph Nichol	L.L.B. 1936	Judge, U.S. District Court of for the District of South Dakota
Donald J. Porter	L.L.B. 1943	Judge, U.S. District Court for the District of South Dakota.
Andrew Wendell Bogue	L.L.B. 1947	Judge, U.S. District Court for the District of South Dakota.
John Bailey Jones	L.L.B. 1953	Judge, U.S. District Court for the District of South Dakota.
Richard Battey	L.L.B. 1953	Judge, U.S. District Court for the District of South Dakota, presiding judge of 'Sue' Dinosaur Case.
Lawrence Leroy Piersol	J.D. 1965	Judge, U.S. District Court for the District of South Dakota.
Jeffrey Lynn Viken	J.D. 1977	Judge, U.S. District Court for the District of South Dakota.
William D. Gerdes	J.D. 1979	Magistrate Judge, U.S. District Court for the District of South Dakota.
Daneta Wollmann	J.D. 2003	Magistrate Judge, U.S. District Court for the District of South Dakota.

== United States Court of Appeals ==
Roger Leland Wollman	J.D. 1962	Chief Judge, United States Court of Appeals for the Eighth Circuit

== United States House of Representatives ==
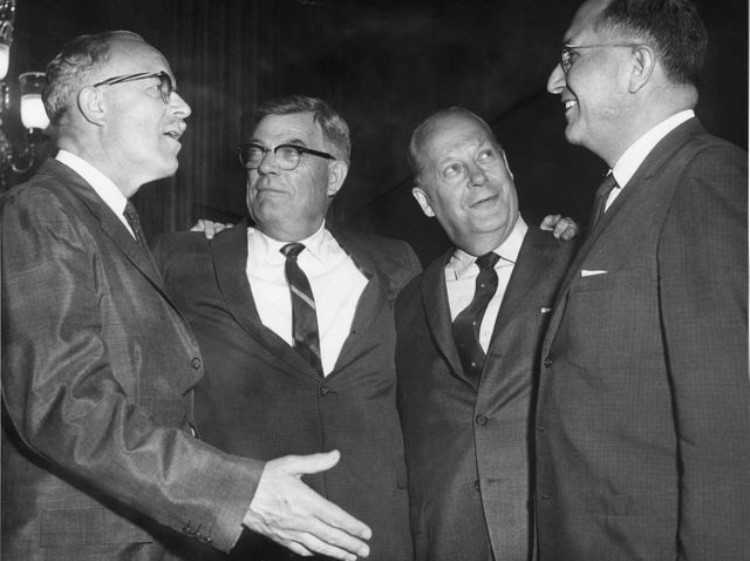
U.S. congressional delegation from South Dakota for the 87th United States Congress contained three alumni from the class of 1927: E.Y. Berry, Joseph H. Bottum, and Harold Lovre.

George Barnes Grigsby	L.L.B.	U.S. Delegate from territory of Alaska.
William Williamson	L.L.B. 1905	U.S. Representative from South Dakota.
Royal Cleaves Johnson	L.L.B. 1906	U.S. Representative from South Dakota, and highly decorated WWI veteran while he was a member of Congress.
Ellis Yarnal Berry	L.L.B. 1927	U.S. Representative from South Dakota.
Harold Lovre	L.L.B. 1927	U.S. Representative from South Dakota.
Frank E. Denholm	L.L.B. 1959	U.S. Representative from South Dakota.
Bill Janklow	J.D. 1966	U.S. Representative from South Dakota.
James Abourezk	J.D. 1966	U.S. Representative, author of the Indian Child Welfare Act, and first Lebanese-American member of Congress.
Tim Johnson	J.D. 1975	U.S. Representative from South Dakota.

== United States Tax Court ==
Diane Kroupa	J.D. 1981	Judge, United States Tax Court and Chief Judge, Minnesota Tax Court

== United States Senate ==
Joseph H. Bottum	L.L.B. 1927	U.S. Senator from South Dakota
James Abourezk	J.D. 1966	U.S. Senator from South Dakota and first Arab-American member of Congress.
Tim Johnson	J.D. 1975	U.S. Senator from South Dakota.

== United States Military ==
Royal C. Johnson	L.L.B. 1906	U.S. Lieutenant, Distinguished Service Cross recipient and Croix de Guerre with gold star from the Republic of France.
Leslie Jensen	L.L.B. 1921	U.S. Colonel in Pacific Theater of WWII
George E. "Bud" Day	L.L.B. 1949	U.S. Brigadier General, Medal of Honor recipient, most highly decorated military officer since Douglas MacArthur, and POW cell-mate with John McCain
Gregory J. Stoltenburg	J.D. 1995	U.S. Lt. Colonel and current Presiding Judge of the Third Circuit Court of South Dakota, 2015–present.
Jason Ravnsborg	J.D. 2001	U.S. Lt. Colonel, Bronze Star recipient and current and 31st Attorney General of South Dakota.

== See also ==
- Attorney General of South Dakota
- South Dakota Supreme Court
- United States Attorney for the District of South Dakota
