= Robert Amundson =

American judge (1938–2024

Associate Justice of the South Dakota Supreme Court
- In office March 11, 1991 – October 11, 2002
- Appointed by: George S. Mickelson
- Preceded by: Robert E. Morgan
- Succeeded by: Judith Meierhenry

Personal details
- Born: June 12, 1938 Sioux Falls, South Dakota, U.S.
- Died: December 11, 2024 (aged 86) Sioux Falls, South Dakota, U.S.
- Education: Augustana College; University of South Dakota School of Law (JD)

Robert Arnold Amundson (July 12, 1938 – December 11, 2024) was an American judge. He served as justice of the South Dakota Supreme Court between 1991 and 2002.

== Early life and education ==
Robert Amundson was born on July 12, 1938, in Sioux Falls, South Dakota. His father was Arnold E. Amundson, a former state legislator.

Amundson graduated from Washington High School in 1956. He completed his undergraduate studies at Augustana College in 1961, earning a degree in business administration, and went on to receive a Juris Doctor (J.D.) degree from the University of South Dakota School of Law in 1964.

== Career ==
Between 1965 and 1969, Amundson served as state assistant attorney general. He became South Dakota securities commissioner in 1971 and held that post for three years. He also had private law practices in Lead and Belle Fourche between 1970 and 1987.

Amundson was appointed to the state second judicial circuit in 1987 by Governor George S. Mickelson. In 1991, Mickelson appointed Amundson to the South Dakota Supreme Court, replacing Robert E. Morgan. He announced his retirement in 2002 and was replaced by Judith Meierhenry.

Augustana University awarded Amundson its Alumni Achievement Award in 2011.

== Personal life and death ==
Amundson married Katherine Ann Larson on August 7, 1965, and the couple had three children together. Amundson was a Republican.

Amundson died in Sioux Falls on December 11, 2024, at the age of 86. The South Dakota Supreme Court chief justice, Steven R. Jensen, called Amundson "a steadfast advocate for fairness and justice, embodying the highest principles of the judiciary during his years of service".

== See also ==
- List of justices of the South Dakota Supreme Court
