= Patricia DeVaney =

American judge (born 1968)

Associate Justice of the South Dakota Supreme Court
- Incumbent
- Assumed office April 4, 2019
- Appointed by: Kristi Noem
- Preceded by: Steven L. Zinter

Personal details
- Born: October 30, 1968 (age 56); Miller, South Dakota, U.S.
- Education: University of South Dakota (BA); University of Virginia (JD)

Patricia J. DeVaney (born October 30, 1968) is an associate justice of the South Dakota Supreme Court, appointed by Governor Kristi Noem in 2019. She became the 52nd member of the court, succeeding the seat vacated by the death of Justice Steven L. Zinter.

== Early life and education ==
She graduated summa cum laude from the University of South Dakota in Vermillion, South Dakota, in 1990, and from the University of Virginia School of Law in 1993.

== Career ==
After graduating law school, DeVaney served in the state attorney general’s office from 1993 to 2012 as a trial lawyer and an appellate lawyer.

In 2012, DeVaney was appointed as a Circuit Court Judge by Governor Dennis Daugaard. She served as a circuit court judge until her elevation to the South Dakota Supreme Court in 2019.

=== South Dakota Supreme Court ===
On April 4, 2019, Governor Kristi Noem appointed DeVaney to the South Dakota Supreme Court, to the seat vacated by the death of Justice Steven Zinter. She was sworn in on May 23, 2019.

Legal offices
Preceded by Steven L. Zinter	Associate Justice of the South Dakota Supreme Court; 2019–present	Incumbent
