= Miller, South Dakota =

City of Miller, South Dakota
- City
- Location in Hand County and the state of South Dakota
- Coordinates: 44°31′12″N 98°59′11″W
- Country: United States
- State: South Dakota
- County: Hand
- Incorporated: 1905

Government
  - Mayor: Tom McGough

Area
  - Total: 0.99 sq mi (2.57 km^{2})
  - Land: 0.99 sq mi (2.56 km^{2})
  - Water: 0 sq mi (0.00 km^{2})
- Elevation: 1,578 ft (481 m)

Population (2020)
  - Total: 1,349
  - Density: 1,362.4/sq mi (526.03/km^{2})
- Time zone: UTC-6 (Central)
  - Summer (DST): UTC-5 (Central Daylight Time)
- Zip Code: 57362
- Area code: 605
- FIPS code: 46-42460
- GNIS feature ID: 1256470
- Website: www.millersd.org

Miller is a city in and the county seat of Hand County, South Dakota, United States. The population was 1,349 at the 2020 census.

== History ==
The city was named for its founder, Henry Miller. The post office has been in operation since 1881.

== Geography ==
According to the United States Census Bureau, the city has a total area of 0.98 square miles (2.54 km^{2}), all land.

Miller has been assigned the ZIP code 57362.

=== Climate ===
Climate data for Miller, South Dakota (1991−2020 normals, extremes 1902−present)
Month	Jan	Feb	Mar	Apr	May	Jun	Jul	Aug	Sep	Oct	Nov	Dec	Year
Record high °F (°C)	65 (18)	70 (21)	90 (32)	98 (37)	107 (42)	112 (44)	113 (45)	112 (44)	110 (43)	97 (36)	82 (28)	70 (21)	113 (45)
Mean daily maximum °F (°C)	26.2 (−3.2)	30.6 (−0.8)	42.6 (5.9)	56.3 (13.5)	68.2 (20.1)	78.2 (25.7)	84.8 (29.3)	82.6 (28.1)	74.4 (23.6)	58.9 (14.9)	43.5 (6.4)	30.4 (−0.9)	56.4 (13.6)
Daily mean °F (°C)	16.6 (−8.6)	20.3 (−6.5)	31.7 (−0.2)	44.1 (6.7)	56.4 (13.6)	66.9 (19.4)	72.7 (22.6)	70.3 (21.3)	61.7 (16.5)	47.2 (8.4)	32.9 (0.5)	21.2 (−6.0)	45.2 (7.3)
Mean daily minimum °F (°C)	7.0 (−13.9)	9.9 (−12.3)	20.7 (−6.3)	31.9 (−0.1)	44.7 (7.1)	55.6 (13.1)	60.7 (15.9)	58.1 (14.5)	49.1 (9.5)	35.4 (1.9)	22.3 (−5.4)	12.1 (−11.1)	34.0 (1.1)
Record low °F (°C)	−48 (−44)	−43 (−42)	−27 (−33)	0 (−18)	15 (−9)	30 (−1)	35 (2)	32 (0)	18 (−8)	−10 (−23)	−22 (−30)	−38 (−39)	−48 (−44)
Average precipitation inches (mm)	0.42 (11)	0.77 (20)	0.91 (23)	2.21 (56)	3.51 (89)	3.86 (98)	3.01 (76)	2.46 (62)	1.95 (50)	2.02 (51)	0.61 (15)	0.59 (15)	22.32 (567)
Average snowfall inches (cm)	7.0 (18)	10.7 (27)	6.8 (17)	5.1 (13)	0.0 (0.0)	0.0 (0.0)	0.0 (0.0)	0.0 (0.0)	0.0 (0.0)	1.1 (2.8)	4.3 (11)	8.7 (22)	43.7 (111)
Average precipitation days (≥ 0.01 in)	4.0	4.7	4.8	7.5	10.3	10.1	7.9	7.4	5.9	6.0	3.2	4.3	76.1
Average snowy days (≥ 0.1 in)	3.3	3.7	2.5	1.6	0.0	0.0	0.0	0.0	0.0	0.5	1.8	3.4	16.8
Source: NOAA

== Demographics ==
Historical population
Census	Pop.	Note	%±
1890	536		—
1900	544		1.5%
1910	1,202		121.0%
1920	1,478		23.0%
1930	1,447		−2.1%
1940	1,460		0.9%
1950	1,916		31.2%
1960	2,081		8.6%
1970	2,148		3.2%
1980	1,931		−10.1%
1990	1,678		−13.1%
2000	1,530		−8.8%
2010	1,489		−2.7%
2020	1,349		−9.4%
U.S. Decennial Census

=== 2020 census ===
As of the 2020 census, Miller had a population of 1,349. The median age was 51.3 years. 18.7% of residents were under the age of 18 and 30.8% of residents were 65 years of age or older. For every 100 females there were 93.0 males, and for every 100 females age 18 and over there were 90.8 males.

0.0% of residents lived in urban areas, while 100.0% lived in rural areas.

There were 627 households in Miller, of which 20.7% had children under the age of 18 living in them. Of all households, 47.7% were married-couple households, 21.5% were households with a male householder and no spouse or partner present, and 28.9% were households with a female householder and no spouse or partner present. About 41.4% of all households were made up of individuals and 22.1% had someone living alone who was 65 years of age or older.

There were 782 housing units, of which 19.8% were vacant. The homeowner vacancy rate was 2.3% and the rental vacancy rate was 21.9%.

Racial composition as of the 2020 census
Race	Number	Percent
White	1,264	93.7%
Black or African American	7	0.5%
American Indian and Alaska Native	10	0.7%
Asian	1	0.1%
Native Hawaiian and Other Pacific Islander	0	0.0%
Some other race	27	2.0%
Two or more races	40	3.0%
Hispanic or Latino (of any race)	39	2.9%

=== 2010 census ===
As of the census of 2010, there were 1,489 people, 724 households, and 396 families living in the city. The population density was 1,519.4 inhabitants per square mile (586.6/km^{2}). There were 839 housing units at an average density of 856.1 units per square mile (330.5 units/km^{2}). The racial makeup of the city was 97.8% White, 0.2% African American, 0.5% Native American, 0.1% Asian, 0.3% from other races, and 1.1% from two or more races. Hispanic or Latino of any race were 0.6% of the population.

There were 724 households, of which 20.3% had children under the age of 18 living with them, 46.1% were married couples living together, 7.5% had a female householder with no husband present, 1.1% had a male householder with no wife present, and 45.3% were non-families. 43.2% of all households were made up of individuals, and 25.4% had someone living alone who was 65 years of age or older. The average household size was 1.97 and the average family size was 2.70.

The median age in the city was 51.2 years. 18.9% of residents were under the age of 18; 4.6% were between the ages of 18 and 24; 17.8% were from 25 to 44; 25.5% were from 45 to 64; and 33.2% were 65 years of age or older. The gender makeup of the city was 45.9% male and 54.1% female.

=== 2000 census ===
As of the census of 2000, there were 1,530 people, 720 households, and 406 families living in the city. The population density was 1,614.1 inhabitants per square mile (623.2/km^{2}). There were 845 housing units at an average density of 891.4 units per square mile (344.2 units/km^{2}). The racial makeup of the city was 99.15% White, 0.07% African American, 0.13% Native American, 0.07% Asian, 0.20% from other races, and 0.39% from two or more races. Hispanic or Latino of any race were 0.26% of the population.

There were 720 households, out of which 21.4% had children under the age of 18 living with them, 48.6% were married couples living together, 6.1% had a female householder with no husband present, and 43.5% were non-families. 41.9% of all households were made up of individuals, and 26.4% had someone living alone who was 65 years of age or older. The average household size was 2.03 and the average family size was 2.77.

In the city, the population was spread out, with 19.1% under the age of 18, 4.4% from 18 to 24, 21.1% from 25 to 44, 22.1% from 45 to 64, and 33.3% who were 65 years of age or older. The median age was 49 years. For every 100 females, there were 83.7 males. For every 100 females age 18 and over, there were 78.9 males.

As of 2000 the median income for a household in the city was $28,929, and the median income for a family was $39,293. Males had a median income of $25,962 versus $17,216 for females. The per capita income for the city was $18,401. About 4.2% of families and 9.5% of the population were below the poverty line, including 8.2% of those under age 18 and 12.2% of those age 65 or over.

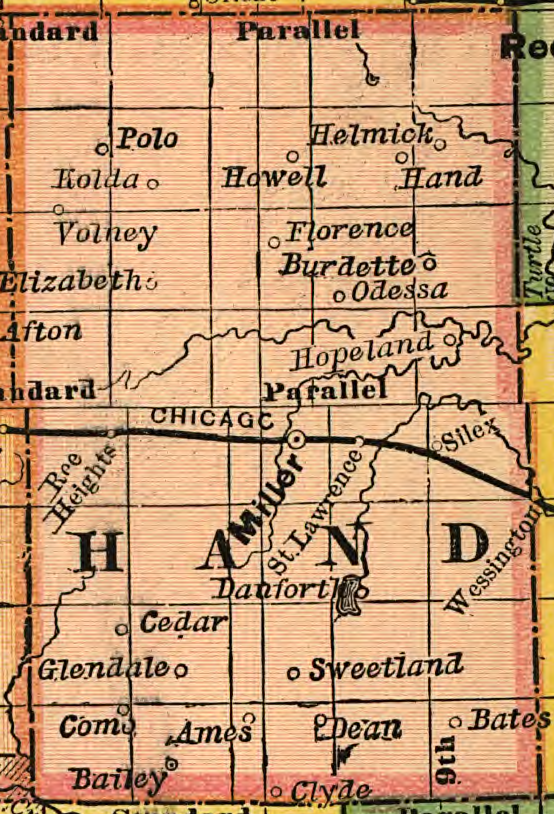
1892 map of Hand County showing Miller and surrounding villages

== Notable people ==
- Harlan J. Bushfield, U.S. senator and governor of South Dakota
- Vera C. Bushfield, U.S. senator from South Dakota, wife of Harlan Bushfield
- Neil Fulton, dean of the University of South Dakota School of Law
- Dale Hargens, South Dakota state representative
- John B. Heilman, South Dakota state representative
- Frank Henderson, justice of the South Dakota Supreme Court
- James Jones, South Dakota state representative
- John L. Pyle, attorney general of South Dakota

== Popular culture ==
Miller was the focal point of a 2002 episode of This American Life discussing a racial incident that occurred in the town.

== See also ==
- List of cities in South Dakota
