= Donald A. Haggar =

American politician

Donald Abraham Haggar (March 12, 1924 – February 23, 2013) was an American lawyer, businessman, and politician.

== Life and career ==
Born in Sioux Falls, South Dakota, Haggar served in the United States Army during World War II. He received his law degree from University of South Dakota School of Law and practiced law. Haggar was elected to represent Minnehaha County in the South Dakota House of Representatives in 1958, as a Republican, and in 1960 was appointed director of the South Dakota Highway department. After serving as director, he operated a real estate firm, Haggar Action Reality, which dealt mostly in ranches and agricultural property. Haggar died in Sioux Falls at the age of 89.
