= Neil Fulton =

American lawyer

14th Dean of University of South Dakota School of Law
- Incumbent
- Assumed office July 1, 2019
- Preceded by: Thomas Geu

Federal Public Defender for District of South Dakota and District of North Dakota
- In office 2010–2019
- Governor: Kristi Noem; Doug Burgum
- Preceded by: Jeffrey L. Viken
- Succeeded by: Jason Tupman

Chief of Staff to the Governor of South Dakota
- In office 2003–2011
- Governor: Mike Rounds
- Preceded by: Dave Knudson
- Succeeded by: Dusty Johnson

Personal details
- Born: Miller, South Dakota
- Party: Independent
- Education: Yale University (BA); University of Minnesota (JD)

Neil Fulton is an American attorney who is the 14th Dean of the University of South Dakota School of Law and was the former Federal Public Defender for the District of South Dakota and District of North Dakota from 2010 to 2019.

== Education ==
Fulton received his bachelor's degree from Yale University in 1994. He enrolled in the University of Minnesota Law School in Minneapolis, Minnesota, where he received his J.D. in 1997, graduating first in his class.

== Legal career ==
Fulton was a judicial law clerk for Judge Diana Murphy of the United States Eighth Circuit Court of Appeals after graduating from law school.

In 2007, Fulton became Chief of Staff for then-Governor Mike Rounds. In that capacity he oversaw the day-to-day operations of state government, managed legislative and budgetary proposals for the Office of the Governor, drafted legislation on many issues and worked with public and private organizations across the state.

== Federal public defender for South Dakota and North Dakota ==
In 2010, Fulton was appointed by the United States Court of Appeals for the Eighth Circuit as the Federal Defender for South Dakota and North Dakota.
