= Laurence J. Zastrow =

American judge (born 1945)

Laurence J. Zastrow (born October 19, 1945) was a justice of the South Dakota Supreme Court from August 10, 1976 to 1978.

Born in Gann Valley, South Dakota, Zastrow received a B.A. from the University of South Dakota–Springfield and an LL.B. from the University of South Dakota, and served as director of the Pennington County, South Dakota, Public Defender Program from 1973 to 1976.

Zastrow was appointed to the court by Governor Richard F. Kneip, following the death of James M. Doyle. He was defeated for reelection to the court in 1978 by Frank Henderson.

Political offices
Preceded by James M. Doyle	Justice of the South Dakota Supreme Court; 1976–1978	Succeeded by Frank Henderson
