= Mark Salter (judge) =

American judge (born 1968)

Associate Justice of the South Dakota Supreme Court
- Incumbent
- Assumed office July 9, 2018
- Appointed by: Dennis Daugaard
- Preceded by: Glen A. Severson

Personal details
- Born: September 26, 1968 (age 57) Huron, South Dakota, U.S.
- Education: South Dakota State University (BS); University of South Dakota (JD)

Military service
- Allegiance: United States
- Branch/service: United States Navy (1994–1997); United States Navy Reserve (2002–2012)
- Rank: Lieutenant Commander
- Unit: Navy Judge Advocate General's Corps

Mark E. Salter (born September 26, 1968) is an American attorney, veteran, and current Associate Justice of the South Dakota Supreme Court, appointed by Governor Dennis Daugaard in 2018. He became the 51st member of the court.

== Early life and education ==
He attended South Dakota State University in Brookings, South Dakota, and graduated from there in 1990. His Juris Doctor degree was conferred by the University of South Dakota School of Law in 1993.

== Career ==
Following law school, Salter served as a law clerk for the Third Judicial District of Minnesota in Marshall, Minnesota in 1993. Following his judicial clerkship, Salter attended the Naval Justice School and entered the U.S. Navy JAG Corps from 1994 to 1997. During that time he served as a prosecuting and defense attorney. He served in the Naval Reserve until 2002 and was honorably discharged as a lieutenant commander in 2012. Salter left active duty and joined the Cutler & Donahoe law firm in Sioux Falls, South Dakota, where he became a partner and focused on civil and business law. While at Cutler & Donahoe, Salter also served for a year as Turner County deputy state’s attorney. From 2004 to 2012, he worked as an assistant United States attorney.

Salter also serves as an adjunct professor at the USD School of Law, where he previously taught advanced criminal procedure and currently teaches advanced appellate advocacy.

=== State judicial service ===
Governor Daugaard appointed Salter as a circuit judge in the Second Judicial Circuit in 2012, and he took office in early 2013.

On May 24, 2018, Governor Dennis Daugaard announced the appointment of Salter to the South Dakota Supreme Court to fill the vacancy to be left by Glen A. Severson who would retire in June 2018. He was sworn in on July 9, 2018.

== Personal life ==
Salter and his wife, Sue, have four children. They are members of Holy Spirit Catholic Church in Sioux Falls.

Legal offices
Preceded by Glen A. Severson	Associate Justice of the South Dakota Supreme Court; 2018–present	Incumbent
