= Richard W. Sabers =

American judge (1938–2022)

Richard Wayne Sabers (February 12, 1938 – January 12, 2022) was an associate justice of the South Dakota Supreme Court.

== Early life and education ==
Sabers was born in Salem, South Dakota. He graduated from St. John's University of Collegeville, Minnesota, in 1960 with a Bachelor of Arts, then served two years as a lieutenant in the Army Corps of Engineers for the United States Army, where he was stationed in Germany. Following his service, he attended University of South Dakota College of Law and began practicing law in Sioux Falls, South Dakota, following his graduation in 1966.

== State judicial service ==
In 1986, South Dakota Governor Bill Janklow appointed Sabers to the state supreme court. Sabers was reelected in 1990, 1998 and 2006.

Sabers retired in 2008 when he reached the mandatory retirement age of 70. He has said that the mandatory retirement age should be raised to 75.
