= George T. Kirk =

Greek-American politician

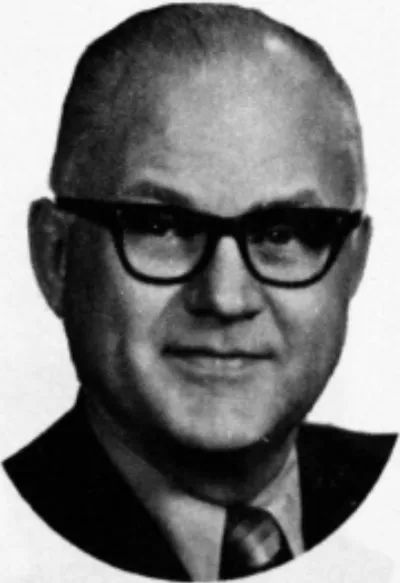
- Kirk in 1971

Member of the South Dakota House of Representatives
- In office 1969–1972

Personal details
- Born: February 14, 1918 Greece
- Died: April 23, 1993 (aged 75)
- Party: Republican

George T. Kirk (February 14, 1918 – April 23, 1993) was a Greek-American politician. He served as a Republican member of the South Dakota House of Representatives.

== Life and career ==
Kirk was born in Greece. In 1969, he was appointed to the South Dakota House of Representatives, following the resignation of William F. Clayton. He died on April 23, 1993, at the age of 75.
