= Sereboff v. Mid Atlantic Medical Services, Inc. =

- Supreme Court of the United States

Argued March 28, 2006 Decided May 15, 2006
- Full case name: Joel Sereboff and Marlene Sereboff, Petitioners v. Mid Atlantic Medical Services, Incorporated
- Citations: 547 U.S. 356 (more) 126 S. Ct. 1869; 164 L. Ed. 2d 612; 2006 U.S. LEXIS 3954; 74 U.S.L.W. 4240; 37 Employee Benefits Cas. (BNA) 1929

Case history
- Prior: Motion to dismiss denied, summary judgment granted in part to plaintiff, 303 F. Supp. 2d 691 (D. Md. 2004); judgment for plaintiff, 316 F. Supp. 2d 265 (D. Md. 2004); affirmed in part, vacated, 407 F.3d 212 (4th Cir. 2005); cert. granted, 546 U.S. 1030 (2005).

Holding
- An ERISA plan fiduciary may seek reimbursement for medical costs from the proceeds of the beneficiary's personal injury settlement.

Court membership
- Chief Justice John Roberts Associate Justices John P. Stevens · Antonin Scalia; Anthony Kennedy · David Souter; Clarence Thomas · Ruth Bader Ginsburg; Stephen Breyer · Samuel Alito

Case opinion
- Majority: Roberts, joined by unanimous

Laws applied
- 29 U.S.C. § 1132(a)(3) (ERISA § 502(a)(3))

Sereboff v. Mid Atlantic Medical Services, Inc., 547 U.S. 356 (2006), was a case decided by the Supreme Court of the United States involving the ability of an Employee Retirement Income Security Act (ERISA) plan fiduciary to recover medical costs from a beneficiary who has been reimbursed for injuries by a third party. The Court ruled unanimously that ERISA permitted the fiduciary to recover costs from the settlement proceeds a beneficiary received in a personal injury lawsuit.

== Background ==
=== ERISA plan, injuries, and settlement ===
Marlene Sereboff and her husband Joel were the beneficiaries of a health insurance plan administered by Mid Atlantic Medical Services, Inc., and covered by ERISA. The plan contained an "Acts of Third Parties" provision, which applied if a third party was responsible for their illness or injury, and required the beneficiaries to reimburse Mid Atlantic for plan benefits from any recovery from that third party. The provision further stated that Mid Atlantic's share of the recovery would not be reduced because the beneficiary did not receive the full damages claimed.

The Sereboffs were injured in a car accident in California, and the plan paid the couple's medical expenses. They filed a tort action in state court against several third parties, seeking compensatory damages for their injuries. Beginning soon after the suit was commenced, Mid Atlantic sent the Sereboffs and their attorney several letters in which it asserted a lien on the anticipated proceeds from the suit for paid medical expenses eventually totaling $74,869.37. The Sereboffs eventually settled their tort suit for $750,000, but did not distribute anything to Mid Atlantic.

=== Collection suit ===
Mid Atlantic filed suit in the U.S. District Court for the District of Maryland, claiming a right to collect from the Sereboffs under § 502(a)(3) of ERISA. Because the Sereboffs' attorney had already distributed the settlement proceeds to them, Mid Atlantic sought a temporary restraining order and preliminary injunction requiring the couple to retain and set aside at least $74,869.37 from the proceeds. The District Court approved a stipulation under which the Sereboffs agreed to preserve the amount claimed in an investment account until after the case was decided on the merits and all appeals exhausted.

The District Court ruled for Mid Atlantic and ordered the Sereboffs to pay $74,869.37, plus interest, with a deduction for Mid Atlantic's share of the attorney's fees and court costs that the Sereboffs had incurred in state court. On appeal, the United States Court of Appeals for the Fourth Circuit affirmed in relevant part. though it observed that the circuits were divided on the question of whether § 502(a)(3) authorized recovery in those circumstances.

== Opinion of the Court ==
The Court unanimously affirmed the Fourth Circuit in an opinion delivered by Chief Justice John G. Roberts.

Under § 502(a)(3) of ERISA, A fiduciary may bring a civil action "(A) to enjoin any act or practice which violates [*11] any provision of this subchapter or the terms of the plan, or (B) to obtain other appropriate equitable relief (i) to redress such violations or (ii) to enforce any provisions of this subchapter or the terms of the plan." The Court believed the only question remaining in the case was whether the relief Mid Atlantic sought from the District Court was "equitable" under § 502(a)(3)(B). The Court analyzed this issue by considering both the nature of the remedy Mid Atlantic sought, and the basis for its claim against the Sereboffs.

=== Equitable nature of relief sought ===
The Court had previously construed section 502(a)(3)(B) of ERISA to only authorize remedies "that were typically available in equity." This was elaborated upon in Great-West Life & Annuity Ins. Co. v. Knudson, in which the Court rejected an ERISA fiduciary's claim for restitution. Knudson had involved similar facts, and the Court had ruled that the restitution sought was not equitable because the funds were not actually in the beneficiary's possession. The liability sought was therefore personal and legal. By contrast, equitable restitution sought to impose a constructive trust or equitable lien on specific funds or property that were in the defendant's possession.

The Court believed that Mid Atlantic's claim was one for equitable restitution, because the Sereboffs' possession of the settlement funds satisfied the requirement that was missing in Knudson. Mid Atlantic was not simply seeking to recover from the Sereboffs' assets generally, but rather to recover through a constructive trust or equitable lien on a specifically identified fund. That this action involved a breach of contract claim did not mean that the relief was not equitable, because that would make the ERISA provision that expressly provides for equitable relief to enforce plan terms "an empty promise."

=== Equitable basis for claim ===
Regarding the basis for Mid Atlantic's claim, the Court considered Barnes v. Alexander to be instructive, in which attorneys sued their supervisor to recover the promised one third of the contingency fee in the case on which they had worked. The Court had ruled that a lien attached to the fee and followed it into the hands of the supervisor, based upon "the familiar rule of equity that a contract to convey a specific object even before it is acquired will make the contractor a trustee as soon as he gets a title to the thing." The Court considered the "Acts of Third Parties" provision in the Sereboffs' ERISA plan analogous to the contingency fee claim, as the provision specifically identified a particular fund and a particular share of that fund to which Mid Atlantic was entitled. Under the rule of equity set forth in Barnes, Mid Atlantic could "follow a portion of the recovery into the Sereboffs' hands as soon as the settlement fund was identified, and impose on that portion a constructive trust or equitable lien."

== See also ==
- Ark. Dep't of Human Servs. v. Ahlborn, 547 U.S. 268 (2006), a case decided the same term regarding the ability of a state agency to recover Medicaid expenditures from personal injury settlement proceeds
- Professor Roger Baron, an ERISA expert who consulted on the Sereboff case and has written extensively about the court's decision in Sereboff.
