= William F. Clayton =

American politician

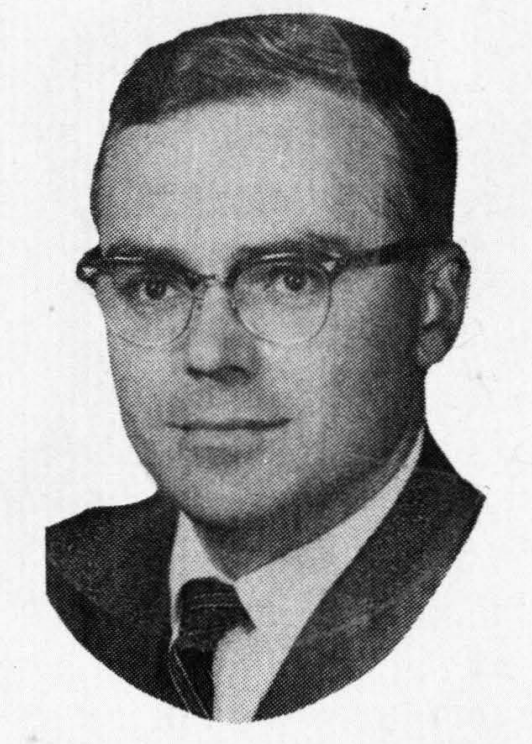

31st United States Attorney for the District of South Dakota
- In office 1969–1977
- President: Richard Nixon

Member of the South Dakota House of Representatives for the 30th district
- In office 1967–1969
- Succeeded by: George T. Kirk

Personal details
- Born: September 20, 1923
- Died: April 20, 2017 (aged 93) Sioux Falls, South Dakota
- Party: Republican
- Education: University of South Dakota; School of Law
- Profession: Attorney

William F. Clayton (September 20, 1923 – April 20, 2017) was an American politician and U.S. Attorney for District of South Dakota.

== Early life and education ==
Clayton graduated from the University of South Dakota School of Law in 1951.

== Career ==
He was a member of the South Dakota House of Representatives. He was a veteran of World War II, with the United States Army. He was later an attorney. He was the United States Attorney for the District of South Dakota from 1969 until 1977.
