= Patrick Garry =

Patrick M. Garry
- Born: July 15, 1955 (age 71)
- Education: University of Minnesota (P.h.D., J.D.)
- Scientific career
- Fields: Constitutional law First Amendment
- Workplaces: University of South Dakota School of Law
- Website: sites.google.com/view/patrickgarry

Patrick Garry (born July 15, 1955) is an American law professor and author who is the director of the Hagemann Center for Legal & Public Policy Research.

== Early life and education ==
Garry attended the University of Minnesota where he earned his B.A., MA., J.D. and a Ph.D. in constitutional history. Garry was a research scholar at the Freedom Forum Media Studies Center and a visiting scholar at Columbia University Law School. Garry served as the legal advisor to the Silha Center for Media Law and Ethics at the University of Minnesota. Garry also served as the legal counsel to the Minnesota News Council.

== Academic career ==
In 2003, Garry became a professor at the University of South Dakota School of Law. He later would become the research director of the Hagemann Center for Legal & Public Policy Research at the university. He is a visiting professor at the University of Utah Law School, University of Missouri School of Law, University of St. Thomas School of Law, and George Washington University Law School.

=== Awards ===
Garry was awarded a Research Catalyst Grant by the University of South Dakota, as well as several other research awards. He has received research grants from the Chiesman Foundation, and has been awarded a Center for Teaching and Learning grant. He is the only faculty member in the history of the University of South Dakota to win the President's Research Excellence Award—the university's highest scholarly research award—outright in both the junior and established faculty categories.

== Selected works ==
In addition to being an author of nonfiction books, Garry has published eight novels. These novels have won 21 literary awards.

=== Books ===
- Nation of Adversaries (1993)
- Scrambling for Protection (1994)
- Wrestling with God: The Courts’ Tortuous Treatment of Religion (2006)
- An Entrenched Legacy (2008)
- Rediscovering a Lost Freedom (2009)
- The South Dakota Constitution (2010)
- Conservatism Redefined: A Creed for the Poor and Disadvantaged (2010)
- Limited Government and the Bill of Rights (2012)
