= James E. McMahon =

American attorney

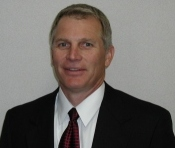

38th United States Attorney for the District of South Dakota
- In office 2002–2005
- President: George W. Bush
- Preceded by: Ted McBride
- Succeeded by: Steven K. Mullin

Personal details
- Party: Republican
- Education: Morningside College; University of South Dakota (JD)
- Profession: Attorney

James E. McMahon is an American attorney and 38th United States Attorney for the District of South Dakota.

== Early life and education ==
Jim McMahon graduated with a J.D. University of South Dakota School of Law in 1977.

== Career ==
McMahon was nominated by President George W. Bush to be the United States Attorney for the District of South Dakota in 2002. McMahon was sworn in as U.S. Attorney on May 12, 2002.

== Later legal career ==
McMahon joined in Redstone Law Firm in Sioux Falls, South Dakota, following his departure from the United States Attorney for the District of South Dakota office.

Legal offices
Preceded by Ted McBride	United States Attorney for the District of South Dakota; 2002–2005	Succeeded by Steven K. Mullin

== See also ==
- United States Attorney for the District of South Dakota
- University of South Dakota School of Law
