= Bartlett Tripp =

American judge

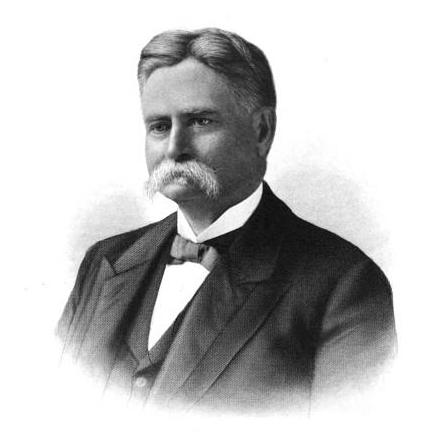

16th United States Minister to Austria-Hungary
- In office 1893–1897
- President: Grover Cleveland
- Preceded by: Frederick Dent Grant
- Succeeded by: Charlemagne Tower Jr.

Chief Justice of the Dakota Territory Supreme Court
- In office 1886–1889
- Preceded by: Alonzo J. Edgerton
- Succeeded by: None (position eliminated at statehood)

Personal details
- Born: July 15, 1839 Harmony, Maine, U.S.
- Died: December 8, 1911 (aged 72) Yankton, South Dakota, U.S.
- Education: Colby College; Albany Law School
- Profession: Attorney; Diplomat; Philanthropist
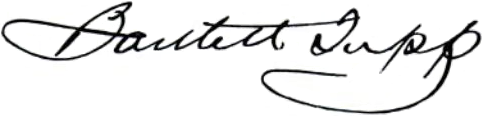
- Signature

Bartlett Tripp (July 15, 1839 – December 8, 1911) was a diplomat, Chief Justice of the Dakota Territory Supreme Court, first professor of the University of South Dakota College of Law and first President of the South Dakota Bar Association.

He was initially considered as a nominee for Vice President of the United States by his law school classmate and best friend William McKinley.

== Early life and education ==
Tripp was born in Harmony, Maine on July 15, 1839, the son of William Tripp (1794–1875), a farmer and Methodist minister who had served in the War of 1812; his mother was Naamah Bartlett (1798–1874), William Tripp's second wife and a sister of Mormon pioneer Patty Bartlett Sessions. The family moved from Harmony to the nearby town of Ripley in 1844. Bartlett Tripp entered Colby College in 1857, but left without graduating in 1861 to travel to California. On the way he visited his older half-brother William in Iowa and also visited the south-eastern part of the Dakota Territory. In California he did some surveying, then moved to Salt Lake City, Utah (where his brother Enoch Bartlett Tripp (1823–1909), a prominent Mormon merchant, lived) and taught school (1864–65). He eventually returned to Maine to regain his health. He then attended Albany Law School, graduating in 1867. While in law school Tripp met future president William McKinley, who became a lifelong friend.

== Initial career in the Dakota Territory ==
Following law school, Tripp practiced law, first in Maine and then in Yankton with his half-brother William, who had been appointed as a Surveyor General for Dakota Territory. He was active in Democratic Party politics, serving as Dakota Territory party chairman, delegate to the national convention in 1872 and 1892, and in 1878 the Democratic candidate for the Territory's delegate in Congress. Bartlett was part of a commission that codified the laws of the territory in 1877 and again in 1903, and served as president of an 1883 Constitutional Convention of for Statehood of South Dakota. From 1885 to 1889 he served as chief justice of the Dakota Territory Supreme Court.

== International career and return to South Dakota ==
From 1893 to 1897 he served as 25th United States Ambassador to Austria under president Grover Cleveland. In December 1897 he was elected as the first president of the recently established South Dakota Bar Association. In 1899, at the request of McKinley, he headed an American-British-German commission which visited Samoa and helped negotiate the Tripartite Convention of 1899 which settled disputes between those countries over the area. Tripp later published a book on his experiences there (My Trip to Samoa, 1911).

Tripp was briefly considered a candidate to be the Republican nominee for vice president under McKinley in 1900, but he withdrew after Theodore Roosevelt entered the field. With no political opportunities left to him, he throw his full efforts into establishing a law school in South Dakota. Once the establishment of the University of South Dakota College of Law was complete in 1901, he became its first professor lecturing on constitutional law and taxation there. Upon his death in 1911, he donated his entire legal collection to the law school's library.

== Legacy ==
His efforts and contributions to the Dakota Territory and the later state of South Dakota earned him multiple namesakes. Tripp County and the town of Tripp in South Dakota are named after Bartlett Tripp. Tripp Park in Yankton was sold to the city for $1 by Tripp's estate; Tripp had intended to give the land to the city, but had not completed the transaction in his lifetime.

== Personal life ==
Tripp was married twice, in 1863 to Ellen Jennings (died 1884) and then in 1887 to Maria Janet (Davis) Washburn (1846–1934), sister of Senator and Governor Cushman K. Davis of Minnesota. Tripp had one daughter, Maude B., by his first wife. Maude (1866–1894) married South Dakota lawyer Charles Hall Dillon, later U.S. Representative and Associate Justice of the South Dakota Supreme Court.

Tripp's second wife Janet (as she was usually called) had been married to a bookkeeper named Franklin Washburn, and had two children by her first marriage. Her first husband was killed in 1902 in a notable train wreck in the Park Avenue railroad tunnel in New York City.

Bartlett Tripp died from heart disease at his home in Yankton, South Dakota on December 8, 1911.
