= Philip N. Hogen =

U.S. Attorney from 1981 to 1991 for the District of South Dakota

34th United States Attorney for the District of South Dakota
- In office 1981–1991
- President: Ronald Reagan
- Succeeded by: Kevin Schieffer

Personal details
- Citizenship: American; Oglala Sioux
- Party: Republican
- Spouse: Marty Hogen
- Children: Vanya Hogen, Herbert Hogen
- Education: Augustana College; University of South Dakota (JD)
- Profession: Attorney

Philip N. Hogen is an American attorney who was formerly the United States Attorney for the District of South Dakota and the chairman of the National Indian Gaming Association. He served as U.S. Attorney from 1981 to 1991, the longest-serving U.S. Attorney in South Dakota's history. He is an Oglala from the Pine Ridge Indian Reservation.

== Early life and education ==
Hogen was born in Kadoka, South Dakota. Hogen graduated from Augustana College in 1967 and the University of South Dakota School of Law in 1970. After obtaining his J.D. degree, he moved to Kennebec, South Dakota.

== Career ==
From 1973 to 1974, Hogen served as an administrative assistant to U.S. senator Jim Abdnor.

Hogen was nominated by President Ronald Reagan in 1981 to be the United States Attorney for the District of South Dakota. He was reappointed in 1987 and served in this position until 1991.

On September 3, 2002, President George W. Bush nominated Hogen to chair the National Indian Gaming Association (NIGC). Hogen was confirmed on November 14, 2002 and served until October 2009, the longest-serving chair of the NIGC. Upon his retirement from federal service, he joined a law firm based in St. Paul, Minnesota, specializing in Native American law.

Legal offices
Preceded by	34th United States Attorney for the District of South Dakota; 1981-1991	Succeeded by Kevin Schieffer
