= Glen A. Severson =

American judge

Glen A. Severson (born March 9, 1949) is a former justice of the South Dakota Supreme Court.

== Early life and education ==
He received a Bachelor of Science from the University of South Dakota in 1972, and graduated from the University of South Dakota School of Law in 1975. He did not take the bar exam as he was admitted to the South Dakota bar under diploma privilege.

== Career ==
In 1993 he was appointed to the trial bench in South Dakota, serving as a circuit judge for the second circuit. Governor Mike Rounds appointed him to the Supreme Court in 2009, and in 2012 the voters retained him for a full eight-year term. In 2017, Severson found that the U.S. Constitution's Dormant Commerce Clause did not allow the state to collect sales tax from out-of-state retailers. In South Dakota v. Wayfair, Inc. (2018), the Supreme Court of the United States vacated that judgment by a vote of 5–4. Severson retired from active service in June 2018.
