= Ted McBride =

American attorney (1949–2018)

35th & 37th United States Attorney for the District of South Dakota
- In office 1999–2001
- President: Bill Clinton
- Preceded by: Karen Schreier
- Succeeded by: James E. McMahon

Personal details
- Party: Democratic
- Education: University of South Dakota (JD)
- Profession: Attorney

Ted McBride (1949–2018) was an American attorney and 37th United States Attorney for the District of South Dakota.

== Early life and education ==
Ted McBride graduated with a J.D. University of South Dakota School of Law in 1978.

== Career ==
McBride initially served as the interim U.S. Attorney in 1993, after the United States Senate voted to not confirm the appointment of Kevin Schieffer after the controversial handling of the Sue-Dinosaur legal dispute. McBride was then appointed by President Bill Clinton to be the United States Attorney for the District of South Dakota in 1999 to replace outgoing U.S. Attorney Karen Schreier, who was appointed a U.S. District Judge by Clinton. McBride was sworn in as U.S. Attorney later that year. He resigned shortly after the accession of George W. Bush to the U.S. Presidency.

== See also ==
- United States Attorney for the District of South Dakota
- University of South Dakota School of Law

Legal offices
Preceded by Karen Schreier	37th United States Attorney for the District of South Dakota; 1999–2001	Succeeded by James E. McMahon
