= Robert A. Miller (judge) =

American judge

Chief justice of the South Dakota Supreme Court
- In office 1990–2001
- Preceded by: Jon Fosheim

Robert Arthur Miller (born August 28, 1939) is a former chief justice of the South Dakota Supreme Court. He was a member of the state's judiciary for 31 years and in 1990, he became Chief Justice of the South Dakota Supreme Court. In 1998, he was appointed to the State Justice Institute (SJI) Board of Directors, which he chaired until 2010.

Born in Aberdeen, South Dakota, Miller received a degree in business administration from the University of South Dakota in 1961, and a J.D. from the same institution in 1963. After working for the office of the South Dakota Attorney General from 1963 to 1965, he entered private practice until his appointment to the South Dakota Sixth Circuit Court in 1971. In 1976, he became presiding judge for that court, and in 1986 Governor Bill Janklow elevated Miller to the state supreme court. In 1990, his colleagues on the court voted him chief justice, and he remained in that office for the duration of his service.

In July 2001, Miller announced his retirement from the state supreme court; his last official duty as a judge was overseeing an adoption by a former law clerk.

On September 5, 1964, Miller married Shirlee, with whom he had five children.
