= Harvey C. Jewett IV =

American attorney and CEO

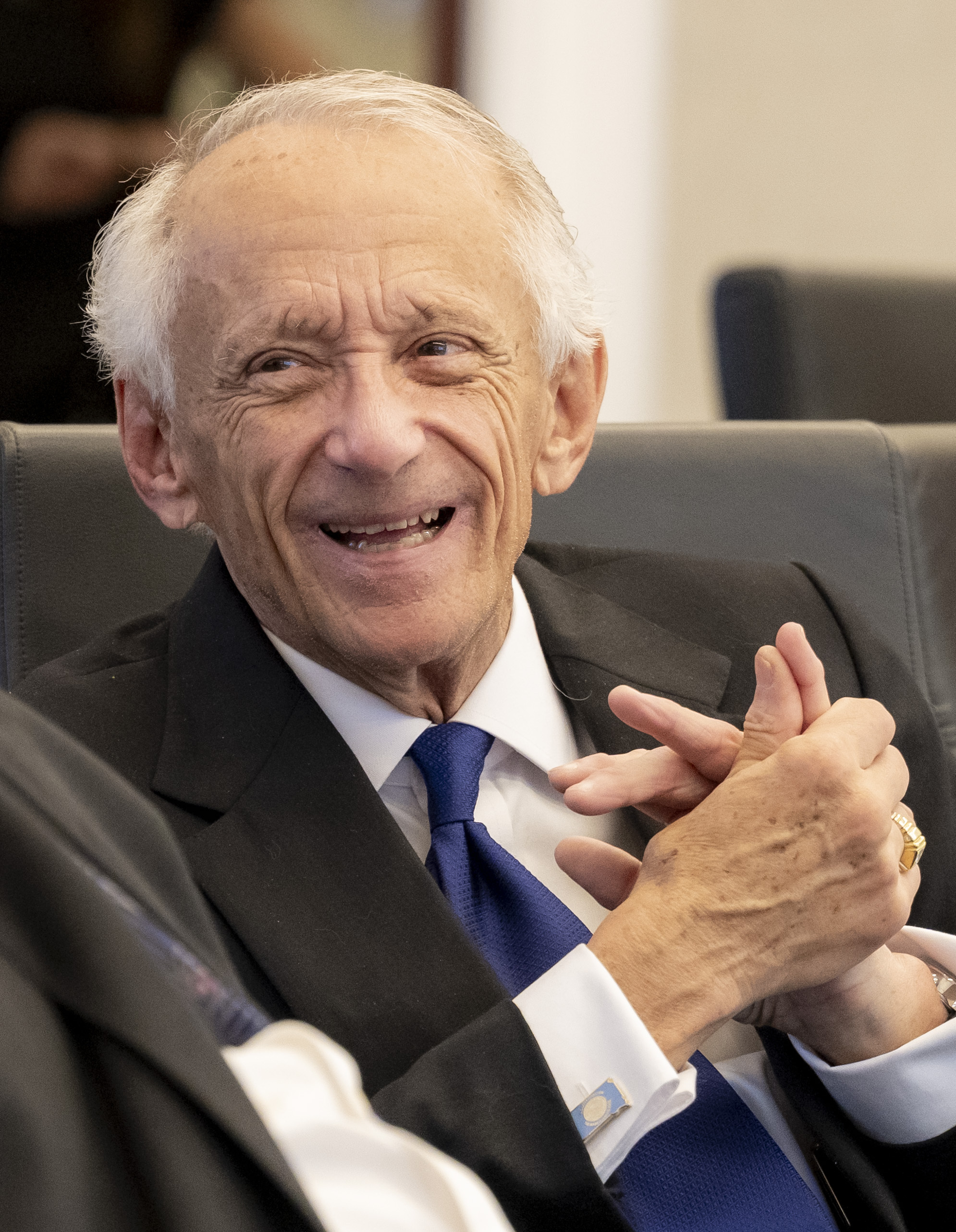
- Jewett in 2025
- Born: October 7, 1948 (age 76); Aberdeen, South Dakota, U.S.
- Occupation: Former CEO of Super 8 Motels

Harvey C. Jewett IV (born October 7, 1948) is an American attorney, former president of South Dakota Board of Regents, and former CEO of Super 8 Motels.

== Early life and education ==
Harvey C. Jewett IV was born in Aberdeen, South Dakota on October 7, 1948. His ancestor and namesake Harvey C. Jewett I was one of the first settlers of Brown County in South Dakota, where he started one of the first wholesale grocery stores in the area. Jewett received his J.D. degree from the University of South Dakota School of Law in 1973 and was the editor-in-chief of the South Dakota Law Review. Jewett was a partner in the Aberdeen law firm of Siegel, Barnett & Schutz.

== Career ==
Jewett was the president of Super 8 Motels, which was sold to Cendant in 1993. He currently is a member of the Super 8 Motels, Inc., Franchisee Advisory Board, Chairman of the Board of Directors of Jewett Drug Co., Inc., also of Aberdeen, and was a member of the Board of Directors of D & K Healthcare Resources, Inc.

He also serves as Chairman of the Great Plains Education Foundation, Inc., Dakota Corp. Scholarship Program, and the Catholic Foundation for Eastern South Dakota. He was a Trustee of the College of St. Benedict and a member of the Joint Governance and other committees for St. John's University and the College of St. Benedict.

Jewett is currently President and Chief Operating Office of the Rivett Group L.L.C., which owns and operates hotel franchises.

== Academic career ==
Following his business career, Jewett was a member and president of the South Dakota Board of Regents. He was first appointed in 1997 by South Dakota Governor William Janklow. He was reappointed in 1999 by Janklow, in 2005 by South Dakota Governor Mike Rounds, and in 2011 by South Dakota Governor Dennis Daugaard. Jewett left the board in 2017 when his term expired.
