= South Dakota v. Opperman =

- Supreme Court of the United States

Argued March 29, 1976 Decided July 6, 1976
- Full case name: South Dakota v. Opperman
- Citations: 428 U.S. 364 (more) 96 S. Ct. 3092; 49 L. Ed. 2d 1000; 1976 U.S. LEXIS 15

Case history
- Prior: Certiorari to the Supreme Court of South Dakota

Holding
- Warrantless routine inventory searches of automobiles impounded or otherwise in lawful police custody, pursuant to standard police procedures, are reasonable and not prohibited by the Fourth Amendment.

Court membership
- Chief Justice Warren E. Burger Associate Justices William J. Brennan Jr. · Potter Stewart; Byron White · Thurgood Marshall; Harry Blackmun · Lewis F. Powell Jr. William Rehnquist · John P. Stevens

Case opinions
- Majority: Burger, joined by Blackmun, Powell, Rehnquist, Stevens
- Concurrence: Powell
- Dissent: White
- Dissent: Marshall, joined by Brennan, Stewart

Laws applied
- U.S. Const. amend. IV

South Dakota v. Opperman, 428 U.S. 364 (1976), elaborated on the community caretaking doctrine. Under the Fourth Amendment, "unreasonable" searches and seizures are forbidden. In addition to their law-enforcement duties, the police must engage in what the court has termed a community caretaking role, including such duties as removing obstructions from roadways to ensure the free flow of traffic. When the police act in this role, they may inventory cars they have seized without "unreasonably" searching those cars.

== Facts of the case ==
Opperman's car was found illegally parked on a street in Vermillion, South Dakota, in the early morning hours of December 10, 1973. Acting pursuant to police procedures, Opperman's car was impounded. Because sundry items were scattered about in the passenger cabin, the police decided to inventory the contents of the car. During the inventory, police found some marijuana in the glove compartment. When Opperman came to the police station to claim his property, he was arrested for possession of marijuana. At trial, he asked to suppress the marijuana, but the trial court denied his request. Opperman was sentenced to 14 days in jail and fined $100. He appealed, and the Supreme Court of South Dakota reversed his conviction on the grounds that the inventory search was an unreasonable one under the Fourth Amendment. At South Dakota's request, the Supreme Court agreed to review the case.

== Inventory searches are reasonable ==
By the time of Opperman, a distinction had emerged in Fourth Amendment jurisprudence between searches of the home and searches of automobiles. Because automobiles were inherently mobile, typically kept outside the home, and subject to regulation and licensing by state and local governments, the law recognized a diminished expectation of privacy in an automobile relative to the expectation of privacy a person has in his home.

The court had also recognized that in addition to their law-enforcement duties, the police engage in a community caretaking function. "To permit the uninterrupted flow of traffic and in some circumstances to preserve evidence, disabled or damaged vehicles will often be removed from the highways or streets at the behest of police engaged solely in caretaking and traffic-control activities. Police will also frequently remove and impound automobiles which violate parking ordinances and which thereby jeopardize both the public safety and the efficient movement of vehicular traffic." The police typically follow established standardized procedures when impounding vehicles for these reasons. These procedures protect the owner's property from vandalism, protect the police from disputes about damage to the property, and protect individual officers from unknown danger associated with vehicle storage.

By the time of the Opperman decision, a number of state and federal courts had already sustained these practices against challenges that they engendered "unreasonable" searches and seizures that violate the Fourth Amendment. In other words, by the time of the Opperman decision, numerous lower courts had already reached a consensus that "when the police take custody of any sort of container [such as] an automobile... it is reasonable to search the container to itemize the property to be held by the police. [This reflects] the underlying principle that the fourth amendment proscribes only unreasonable searches." Inventory searches of automobiles must necessarily extend to the trunk and the glove compartment, since these are places where people keep important documents and valuables.

Accordingly, the court had little trouble concluding that these inventory searches did not violate the Fourth Amendment. Allowing the police the authority to hold the car itself, but deny them the authority to search inside it, would be incongruous. Furthermore, the court had already sanctioned an inventory search of an impounded car suspected to contain the service revolver of a fugitive Chicago police officer. The search in this case was conducted according to standard police procedure, and no suggestion existed that the search was a pretext for an investigation. Thus, the search here was reasonable, as well.

== Balancing the interests of society and the individual ==
Justice Powell believed that the Fourth Amendment required a balancing of the interests of society against those of the individual. Balancing those interests in this case, he concluded that the search of Opperman's car was reasonable and did not require a warrant.

Powell contended that little danger was associated with impounding automobiles. On occasion, a car could contain some very dangerous item, and the police cannot know in advance which cars those might be. Furthermore, society has an interest in minimizing the number of false claims filed against the police, yet Powell did not believe that inventories were completely effective in discouraging false claims, since an interloper could have stolen something before the police impounded the car, or the police could make a mistake in recording the contents of the car. Also, society has a great interest in the protection of property in impounded cars, because people might not be comfortable leaving valuables in their cars for several days even if they might do so for a few hours. Powell also asserted that people have a nontrivial expectation of privacy in the contents of their automobiles. The search in this case, though, did not invade that interest, because it was limited to an inventory of the contents and conducted according to standard procedures.

For these reasons, Powell concluded that the search was reasonable, so did not require a warrant. To be sure, the inventory search at issue in Opperman did not fall into one of the six traditional exceptions to the warrant requirement. Because inventory searches are not intended to discover evidence of criminal activity (even though discovering such evidence might incidentally result), the abuses against which the warrant requirement is intended to protect did not arise in the case of inventory searches. Furthermore, an inventory search does not involve the exercise of discretion, as criminal investigations and certain regulatory searches do.

Justice Marshall struck a different balance between the interests of society and the individual. A diminished expectation of privacy was not the same as no expectation of privacy at all. Furthermore, Marshall disputed that the three reasons the majority advanced to justify the inventory search were as compelling in this case as the majority claimed. A search of valuables does not address a concern for police safety. Looking in the glove compartment for valuables seemed excessive in light of the other legal protections afforded "gratuitous depositors" under South Dakota law. Although protecting valuables inside an impounded car is important, searching each and every impounded car without the owner's consent exceeded the owner's privacy interest. "One need not carry contraband to prefer that the police not examine one's private possessions."

Thus, Justice Marshall argued, "according to the court's result, the law may presume that each owner in Opperman's position consents to the search." This could not be, for the law ordinarily required the police to obtain consent on a case-by-case basis. If the police were to dispense with the consent requirement, a specific reason must exist to believe that this car contained "particular valuable property threatened by the impoundment." But Justice Marshall saw no such specific evidence in the record in this case, because the owner was apparently content to leave the car parked on the street and the other items that were in plain view did not suggest that anything of particular value would be in the glove compartment. "The court's result in this case elevates the conservation of property interests—indeed mere possibilities of property interests—above the privacy and security interests protected by the Fourth Amendment."

== See also ==
- List of United States Supreme Court cases, volume 428
