= Frank Henderson (South Dakota politician) =

American judge

Frank Ellis "Rudy" Henderson (April 7, 1928 – December 28, 2012) was an American politician and jurist from Miller, South Dakota.

== Career ==
Henderson served in the South Dakota Senate twice, in 1965–1966 and in 1969–1970. Henderson had a law practice in Rapid City and then Hill City.

== Judicial service ==
In 1974, he was elected as a circuit judge for the Seventh Judicial Circuit Court for South Dakota. In 1979, he was elected as an associate justice of the South Dakota Supreme Court, defeating incumbent Laurence J. Zastrow, and served until 1994.

== Military service ==
Henderson was a veteran who fought in the Korean War from 1951 to 1953. He earned the United Nations Medal, the Korean Service Medal and a Bronze Star for his service. He also suffered for several decades from post-traumatic stress disorder.
