= Harold Lovre =

American politician (1904–1972)

Harold O. Lovre
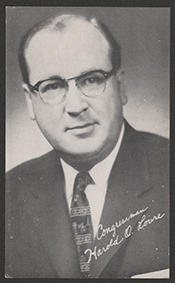

Member of the U.S. House of Representatives from South Dakota's 1st district
- In office January 3, 1949 – January 3, 1957
- Preceded by: Karl E. Mundt
- Succeeded by: George McGovern

Member of the South Dakota Senate
- In office 1941–1944

Personal details
- Born: Harold Orrin Lovre; January 30, 1904 Toronto, South Dakota, U.S.
- Died: January 17, 1972 (aged 67) Silver Spring, Maryland, U.S.
- Resting place: Parklawn Memorial Park in Rockville, Maryland
- Party: Republican
- Spouse: Viola Florell
- Education: St. Olaf College; University of South Dakota (JD)

Harold Orrin Lovre (January 30, 1904 – January 17, 1972) was an American politician. A member of the Republican Party, Lovre represented South Dakota in the United States House of Representatives from 1949 to 1957.

== Early life and education ==
Lovre was born in Toronto, South Dakota. He was married to Viola Florell. He earned his bachelor's degree at St. Olaf College in Northfield, Minnesota, then graduated from the University of South Dakota School of Law with his J.D. in 1927.

== Law and political career ==
He was admitted to the bar in 1927 via diploma privilege and began the practice of law in Hayti, South Dakota. He twice acted as the state's attorney of Hamlin County (1929–1932 and 1937–1940), and later practiced law in Watertown, South Dakota. He additionally served as president of the State Board of Agriculture in 1939 and 1940.

Lovre served in the South Dakota Senate from 1941 to 1944 as a Republican, and later served as chairman of the South Dakota Republican Committee in 1947 and 1948.

== Congressional career ==
In 1948, Lovre was elected as a Republican to the United States House of Representatives, representing South Dakota's 1st congressional district. He served from January 3, 1949, to January 3, 1957. He ran for re-election to a fifth term in 1956, but was defeated by Democrat George McGovern, a future presidential nominee.

== Later life and death ==
Lovre then resumed the private practice of law in Maryland until his death, living in Silver Spring, Maryland, where he died. His remains were buried at Parklawn Memorial Park in Rockville, Maryland.

U.S. House of Representatives
Preceded by Karl E. Mundt	Member of the U.S. House of Representatives from South Dakota's 1st congressional district 1949–1957	Succeeded by George McGovern
