= Roger Baron =

American academic

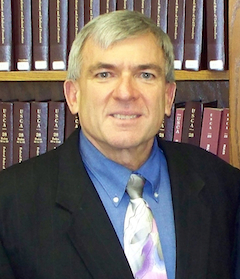
- Education: University of Missouri School of Law
- Occupations: Professor; Attorney
- Website: erisawithprofessorbaron.com/

Roger Baron is an American attorney, ERISA Subrogation and Reimbursement Expert, and law professor at University of South Dakota School of Law from 1990 to 2015.

== Early life and education ==
Baron graduated from the University of Missouri at Columbia School of Law in 1976. He practiced law in Missouri for nine years before beginning his teaching career at South Texas College of Law in 1985.

== Career ==
Baron's is an ERISA reimbursement claims specialist. His writings on ERISA Reimbursement and subrogation have been cited in written opinions by Federal Courts in Nebraska, Illinois, New Jersey, and Washington.
