= Ralph E. Erickson =

American lawyer (born 1928)

11th United States Deputy Attorney General
- In office June 28, 1972 – February 1973
- President: Richard Nixon
- Preceded by: Richard Kleindienst
- Succeeded by: Joseph Tyree Sneed III

Personal details
- Born: October 3, 1928 (age 98) Jamestown, New York, U.S.
- Spouse: Janet Cass
- Children: 2
- Education: Cornell University (AB); Harvard University (JD)
- Profession: Attorney

Ralph E. Erickson (born October 3, 1928) is an American lawyer who served as the 11th Deputy Attorney General of the United States from 1972 to 1973.

== Biography ==
Erickson was born in Jamestown, New York, on October 3, 1928. He attended Cornell University and graduated with his A.B. He later attended Harvard Law School, where he obtained his J.D. He practiced law in Los Angeles. He was appointed the 11th Deputy Attorney General of the United States and took office on June 28, 1972.
