= Steven L. Zinter =

American lawyer (1950–2018)

Associate Justice of the South Dakota Supreme Court
- In office April 2, 2002 – October 30, 2018
- Appointed by: Bill Janklow

Personal details
- Born: September 18, 1950 Minneapolis, Minnesota, U.S.
- Died: October 30, 2018 (aged 68) Cannon Falls, Minnesota, U.S.
- Party: Democratic
- Education: University of South Dakota (BS, JD)

Steven Lee Zinter (September 18, 1950 – October 30, 2018) was an American lawyer who served as an associate justice of the South Dakota Supreme Court.

== Early life and education ==
Zinter was born in Minneapolis, Minnesota, on September 18, 1950, and attended the University of South Dakota, receiving his Bachelor of Science in 1972 and his Juris Doctor in 1975.

== Legal career ==
He did not take the bar exam as he was admitted to the South Dakota bar under the state's diploma privilege. He opened a private practice in Pierre, served as an Assistant Attorney General of South Dakota for the state, and served as Hughes County State's Attorney. In 1987 Zinter was appointed a circuit court judge and became presiding judge of the sixth judicial circuit in 1997. Zinter also served as trustee of the South Dakota Retirement System and president of the South Dakota Judges Association. South Dakota Governor Bill Janklow appointed him to the state supreme court on April 2, 2002.

== Death ==
Zinter died on October 30, 2018, in Cannon Falls, Minnesota, from complications from surgery at the Mayo Clinic, in Rochester, Minnesota, at the age of 68.
