= Courts of Minnesota =

US state judicial system

Courts of Minnesota refers to the judicial system of the U.S. state of Minnesota, which has several levels, including two appellate-level courts — the Minnesota Supreme Court and the Minnesota Court of Appeals — and various lower courts.

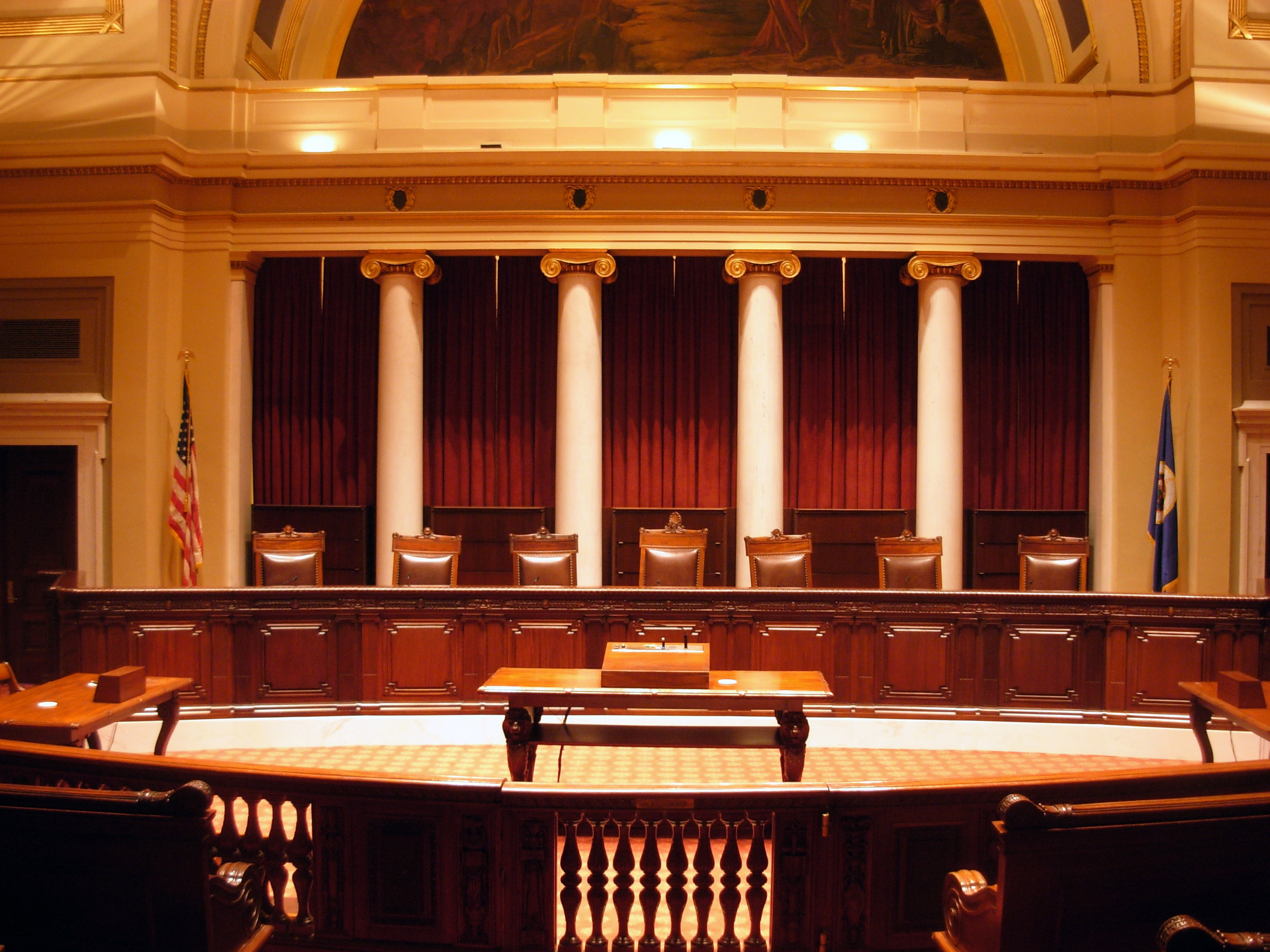
Supreme Court Chamber of the Minnesota Supreme Court in the Minnesota State Capitol in Saint Paul.

State courts of Minnesota

- Minnesota Supreme Court
  - Minnesota Court of Appeals
    - Minnesota District Courts (10 districts)
  - Minnesota Tax Court
  - Minnesota Workers' Compensation Court of Appeals

Federal courts located in Minnesota

- United States District Court for the District of Minnesota
