= Judith Meierhenry =

American judge

Judith Knittel Meierhenry (born January 20, 1944) is a former associate justice and the first woman to serve on the South Dakota Supreme Court.

== Early life and education ==
Meierhenry attended the University of South Dakota, receiving her Bachelor of Science in 1966, her Master's degree in English in 1968, and her Juris Doctor from the University of South Dakota School of Law in 1977. She lived in Vermillion, South Dakota and practiced law there.

== Career ==
In 1979 South Dakota Governor Bill Janklow appointed her to serve in the State Economic Opportunity Office. In 1980 she became state Secretary of Labor, and in 1983 she became state Secretary of Education and Cultural Affairs. From 1985 through 1988 she served as senior manager and assistant general counsel for Citibank South Dakota in Sioux Falls.

Meierhenry was appointed judge of the Second Circuit Court on December 16, 1988 by Governor George S. Mickelson and presiding judge of the Second Circuit Court in 1997. In November 2002 Governor Janklow appointed her to the South Dakota Supreme Court, and she served until her retirement in June 2011.

== Personal life ==
Meierhenry's husband, Mark V. Meierhenry, served as Attorney General of South Dakota from 1979 to 1987.

Meierhenry has two children.

== See also ==
- List of female state supreme court justices
