= South Dakota Supreme Court =

Highest court in the U.S. state of South Dakota

- Seal of the South Dakota Supreme Court
- Interactive map of South Dakota Supreme Court
- Established: 1889
- Jurisdiction: South Dakota
- Location: Pierre, South Dakota
- Composition method: Missouri Plan
- Authorised by: South Dakota Constitution
- Appeals to: Supreme Court of the United States
- Judge term length: 8 years
- Number of positions: 5
- Website: Official Website

Chief Justice
- Currently: Steven R. Jensen
- Since: January 5, 2021
- Lead position ends: 2028

The South Dakota Supreme Court is the highest court in the state of South Dakota. It is composed of a chief justice and four associate justices appointed by the governor. One justice is selected from each of five geographic appointment districts. Justices face a nonpolitical retention election three years after appointment and every eight years after that. The justices also select their own chief justice.

The Supreme Court of South Dakota serves as the final appellate court in the state, reviewing the decisions of state circuit courts. The Supreme Court is also authorized to issue original or remedial writs and provide advice to the governor regarding the scope of executive powers.

The court also provides administration for South Dakota's unified court system, preparing and submitting the judiciary's annual budget, appointing court personnel, and generally supervising the circuit courts. The court is also charged with making the rules covering practice and procedure, administration of the courts, terms of courts, admissions to the bar, and discipline of members of the bar within the state of South Dakota.

== History ==
=== Territorial court ===
The Supreme Court of the Dakota Territory was established in Yankton, South Dakota in 1861. It was the first Territorial Supreme Court in American history. Initially, justices were appointed directly by the President of the United States. The first court consisted of three justices: Philemon Bliss, Lorenzo P. Williston, and Joseph L. Williams, appointed by President Abraham Lincoln. The court heard no cases until December 3, 1867. In 1879 the court enlarged to four justices, then six in 1884, and eight in 1888.

=== Statehood ===
In 1889, the Dakota Territory was split into North Dakota and South Dakota, and the Territorial Supreme Court was formally dissolved by President Benjamin Harrison. Bartlett Tripp served as the last Chief Justice of the Dakota Territory. He left the court in 1889 upon South Dakota's statehood and to become the 25th United States Ambassador to Austria.

An election was held in South Dakota to select the first state supreme court. Justices Dighton Corson, Alphonso G. Kellam, and John E. Bennett were elected and sworn on October 15, 1889. Since there was no capitol building yet for the new state, the oath-taking ceremony took place on the Hughes County courthouse veranda.

The court was forced to use the county courthouse until 1891 when it began holding court in the state legislature's senate chambers. The South Dakota Supreme Court did not receive its own chambers until the autumn of 1905.

=== Modern day court ===
In 2002, Judith Meierhenry was appointed by Governor William Janklow as the first female Supreme Court Justice. She served until her retirement in 2011. In 2014, Janine Kern was appointed by Governor Dennis Daugaard. At the time of her appointment she was the only Justice on the South Dakota Supreme Court to not receive admission via diploma privilege. In 2017, she was joined by Steven R. Jensen who sat for the bar exam in 1988.

== Districts ==
Candidates for selection as Justices for the South Dakota Supreme Court come from one of five Appointment Districts. These districts follow county lines as follows:

=== District 1 ===
- Custer
- Lawrence
- Meade
- Pennington

=== District 2 ===
- Minnehaha

=== District 3 ===
- Bennett
- Brookings
- Brule
- Buffalo
- Fall River
- Haakon
- Hand
- Hughes
- Hyde
- Jackson
- Jerauld
- Jones
- Kingsbury
- Lake
- Lyman
- Mellette
- Miner
- Moody
- Oglala Lakota
- Sanborn
- Stanley
- Sully
- Todd
- Tripp

=== District 4 ===
- Aurora
- Bon Homme
- Charles Mix
- Clay
- Davison
- Douglas
- Gregory
- Hanson
- Hutchinson
- Lincoln
- McCook
- Turner
- Union
- Yankton

=== District 5 ===
- Brown
- Butte
- Campbell
- Clark
- Codington
- Corson
- Day
- Deuel
- Dewey
- Edmunds
- Faulk
- Grant
- Hamlin
- Harding
- Marshall
- McPherson
- Perkins
- Potter
- Roberts
- Spink
- Walworth
- Ziebach

== Justices ==
=== Supreme Court justices ===
The current justices of the South Dakota Supreme Court.

District	Name	Born	Start	Chief term	Term ends	Appointer	Law school
4	Steven R. Jensen, Chief Justice	March 18, 1963 (age 63)	November 3, 2017	2021–present	2028	Dennis Daugaard (R)	South Dakota
2	Mark Salter	September 26, 1968 (age 57)	July 9, 2018	–	2030	Dennis Daugaard (R)	South Dakota
3	Patricia DeVaney	October 30, 1968 (age 57)	April 4, 2019	–	2030	Kristi Noem (R)	Virginia
5	Scott P. Myren	September 22, 1964 (age 61)	January 5, 2021	–	2032	Kristi Noem (R)	Rutgers-Camden
1	Robert Gusinsky		December 8, 2025	–	2028	Larry Rhoden (R)	South Dakota
