= Mike Wilson (South Dakota politician) =

American politician

Member of the South Dakota House of Representatives from the 32nd district
- In office January 1999 – January 2001 Serving with Tom Hennies
- Succeeded by: Stan Adelstein

Personal details
- Party: Democratic

Michael A. Wilson is an American lawyer and politician from South Dakota.

== Legal career ==
Wilson studied economics at South Dakota State University and earned a J. D. from the University of South Dakota School of Law. He was a law clerk for the Fourth Judicial Circuit Court, then worked for Morgan, Theeler, Cogley & Padrnos, starting in 1987. After moving to Rapid City, Wilson joined the Quinn, Eiesland, Day & Barker law firm. In 2007, the firm was renamed for Wilson and Ken Barker.

== Political career ==
Wilson was elected to the South Dakota House of Representatives in 1998 for District 32, but lost reelection in 2000. James W. Abbott and Wilson formed the Democratic gubernatorial ticket for the 2002 election, and lost to Republicans Mike Rounds and Dennis Daugaard. Wilson declared his candidacy for the state house in 2004, but was defeated for the second time. He endorsed Hillary Clinton's 2008 presidential campaign.

Party political offices
Preceded by Elsie Meeks	Democratic nominee for Lieutenant Governor of South Dakota; 2002	Succeeded by Eric Abrahamson
