= 2002 South Dakota gubernatorial election =

- November 2, 2002
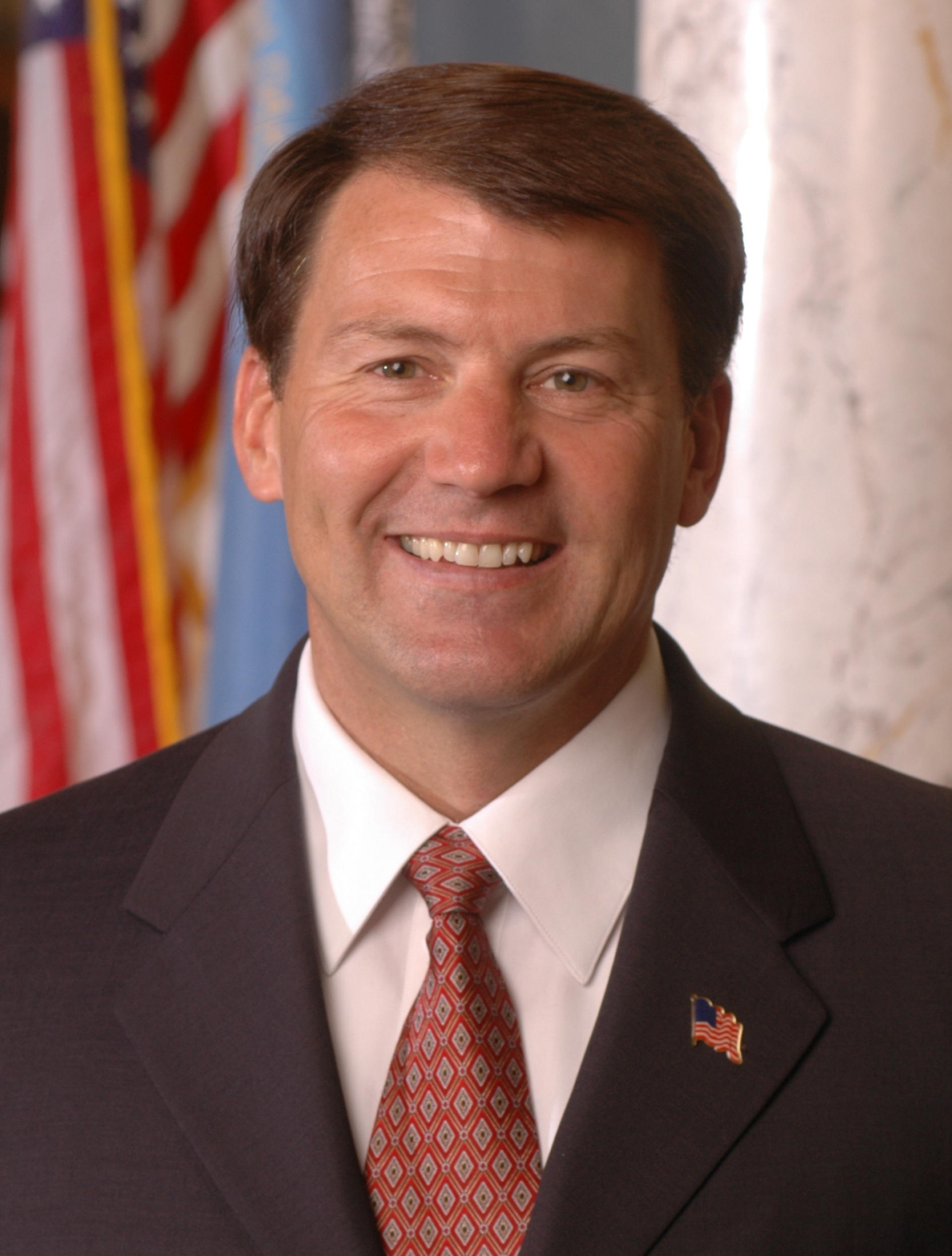

Nominee	Mike Rounds	Jim Abbott
Party	Republican	Democratic
Running mate	Dennis Daugaard	Michael Wilson
Popular vote	189,920	140,263
Percentage	56.77%	41.92%
- County results Rounds: 50–60% 60–70% 70–80% 80–90% Abbott: 50–60% 60–70% 70–80% 80–90%
Governor before election
Bill Janklow
Republican
Elected Governor
Mike Rounds
Republican

The 2002 South Dakota gubernatorial election took place on November 2, 2002 to elect a Governor of South Dakota. Incumbent Governor Bill Janklow was term-limited and couldn't seek reelection to a third consecutive (and fifth overall) term. Janklow instead ran successfully for the at-large district in the United States House of Representatives. Republican nominee Mike Rounds was elected with 56.8% of the vote, defeating Democratic nominee Jim Abbott by a margin of almost 15%.

== Democratic primary ==
=== Candidates ===
- Jim Abbott, President of the University of South Dakota, former South Dakota State Representative
- Ron J. Volesky, South Dakota State Senator
- Jim Hutmacher, South Dakota State Senator
- Robert Hockett

=== Results ===
Democratic primary results
Party	Candidate	Votes	%
Democratic	Jim Abbott	46,794	68.78
Democratic	Ron J. Volesky	11,481	16.87
Democratic	Jim Hutmacher	8,847	13.00
Democratic	Robert Hockett	915	1.34
Total votes		68,037	100.00

== Republican primary ==
=== Candidates ===
- Mike Rounds, former South Dakota State Senator
- Mark Barnett, Attorney General of South Dakota
- Steve T. Kirby, former Lieutenant Governor of South Dakota

=== Campaign ===
Rounds' victory was one of South Dakota's greatest political upsets. Until late in 2001, then-Congressman John Thune was the front-runner for the nomination. When Thune passed on the race in order to challenge Senator Tim Johnson, state Attorney General Mark Barnett and former Lieutenant Governor Steve T. Kirby quickly became candidates. Rounds declared his candidacy late, in December 2001 and was out-raised and outspent ten-to-one by each of his opponents.

However, the contest between Kirby and Barnett soon became very negative and "dirty". Barnett attacked Kirby for not investing in companies based in South Dakota and for his involvement with Collagenesis, a company which removed skin from donated human cadavers and processed them for use. It became the subject of a massive scandal when it was revealed that the company was using the skins for much more lucrative cosmetic surgery like lip and penis enhancements while burn victims "lie waiting in hospitals as nurses scour the country for skin to cover their wounds, even though skin is in plentiful supply for plastic surgeons". Kirby invested in the company after the scandal broke and Barnett attacked him for it in television advertisements. However, the advertisements backfired because "the claims were so outlandish, that people thought for sure that they were exaggerated or completely fabricated."

As the two front-runners concentrated on attacking each other, Rounds insisted on running a positive campaign and was not attacked by his opponents. Rounds' positive image and extensive knowledge of state government won him many supporters who were alienated by the front-runners. On the day of the primary election, Rounds won a stunning victory, with 44.3% of the vote to Barnett's 29.5% and Kirby's 26.1%.

=== Results ===
Republican primary results
Party	Candidate	Votes	%
Republican	Mike Rounds	49,331	44.34
Republican	Mark Barnett	32,868	29.54
Republican	Steve T. Kirby	29,065	26.12
Total votes		111,264	100.00

== General election ==
=== Predictions ===
Source	Ranking	As of
The Cook Political Report	Lean R	October 31, 2002
Sabato's Crystal Ball	Likely R	November 4, 2002

=== Results ===
South Dakota gubernatorial election, 2002
Party	Candidate	Votes	%	±%
Republican	Mike Rounds	189,920	56.77%	−7.27%
Democratic	Jim Abbott	140,263	41.92%	+9.07%
Independent	James P. Carlson	2,393	0.72%	
Libertarian	Nathan A. Barton	1,983	0.59%	−1.10%
Majority		49,657	14.84%	−16.35%
Turnout		334,559		
Republican hold		Swing		

==== Counties that flipped from Republican to Democratic ====
- Day (largest city: Webster)
- Roberts (largest city: Sisseton)
- Ziebach (largest city: Dupree)
- Corson (Largest city: McLaughlin)
- Bennett (largest city: Martin)
- Bon Homme (Largest city: Springfield)
