= Violet Biever =

American politician

Member of the South Dakota House of Representatives from the 25th district
- In office 1975–1982

Personal details
- Born: November 4, 1911 Oelrichs, South Dakota
- Died: October 3, 2010 (aged 98) Hot Springs, South Dakota
- Party: Democratic

Violet S. Biever (November 4, 1911 - October 3, 2010) was an American politician. A Democrat, she served in the South Dakota House of Representatives from 1975 to 1982.

== Biography ==
Biever was born on November 4, 1911 in Oelrichs, South Dakota. Outside of being a politician, Biever also worked as a teacher.

On May 1, 1974, Biever announced her candidacy as a representative for South Dakota's 25th legislative district. She won in the general election that November, and continued serving in the South Dakota House until 1982. After District 25 was redrawn in 1982 (a result of redistricting following the 1980 United States Census), there were three incumbents who now resided in the 25th district. In the general election, Republican incumbents (Note: In South Dakota, each legislative district elects one state senator and two state representatives. For state House elections, the two candidates with the most votes are elected representative.) Joel Rickenback and Gordon Pederson (who formerly represented the 27th district) defeated her and Democratic challenger Carol Anderson. In 1984, she ran for the South Dakota Senate, winning the Democratic primary but ultimately losing the general election to Jack Manke.

Biever died on October 3, 2010, at Fall River Hospital in Hot Springs, South Dakota.
