= Dan Ahlers =

American businessman and politician

Member of the South Dakota Senate from the 25th district
- In office January 13, 2009 – January 11, 2011
- Preceded by: Arnie Hauge
- Succeeded by: Tim Rave

Member of the South Dakota House of Representatives from the 25th district
- In office January 10, 2017 – January 8, 2019
- Preceded by: Roger W. Hunt
- Succeeded by: Jon Hansen
- In office January 9, 2007 – January 13, 2009
- Preceded by: Mike Kroger
- Succeeded by: Oran Sorenson

Personal details
- Born: Daniel Paul Ahlers; November 14, 1973 (age 52) Dell Rapids, South Dakota, U.S.
- Party: Democratic
- Spouse: Amy Coffaa Ahlers
- Children: 2
- Education: Augustana University (BA)
- Website: Campaign website

Daniel Paul Ahlers (born November 14, 1973) is an American businessman and politician who served in both the South Dakota House of Representatives, from 2006 to 2008 and later from 2017 to 2019, and the South Dakota Senate, from 2008 to 2010. A member of the Democratic Party, Ahlers represented the 25th legislative district, which encompasses Dell Rapids and areas north and northeast of Sioux Falls.

In 2020, Ahlers was his party's nominee for South Dakota's class 2 U.S. Senate seat, losing to Republican incumbent Mike Rounds. Ahlers was his party's nominee for the state's 2026 gubernatorial election.

== Early life, education, and business career ==
Daniel "Dan" Paul Ahlers was born in Dell Rapids, South Dakota, on November 14, 1973. His family moved to Rapid City and Gillette, Wyoming, before returning to Dell Rapids when he was in high school. He graduated from Dell Rapids High School, where he participated in concert and jazz band, newspaper, basketball, and cross country. In 1996, Ahlers served as a Senate Intern to Senator Bernie Hunhoff, Senator Chet Jones, and Senator JoAnn Morford Berg. Ahlers was an assistant manager at Menards from 1992 to 2001. He graduated from Augustana University in Sioux Falls in 1997 with a Bachelor's of Arts in government and international affairs.

In 1999, Ahlers opened Video Plus, a video rental store in Dell Rapids. He also opened Video Plus stores in Hartford, South Dakota and Tea, South Dakota, selling both in 2005. The Dell Rapids Video Plus closed in 2019. Ahlers has been a substitute teacher in the Dell Rapids School District. He also owned Jabberwock Coffee House from 2008 to 2011.

Ahlers has served community organizations as a Kids Voting South Dakota board member, a Carroll Institute board member, president of the Haven before & after school program, and president of the Dell Rapids Community Fund.

In February 2021, Ahlers stepped down as president and interim administrator of the Dell Rapids Chamber of Commerce after 12 years in the role.

Ahlers was hired in early 2023 to serve as executive director of the South Dakota Democratic Party. Ahlers was re-hired in October 2023.

== South Dakota State Legislature ==
Ahlers served in the state House of Representatives in 2007–08, in the state Senate in 2009–10, and again in state house in 2017–18. He narrowly lost his 2018 reelection bid, receiving 101 fewer votes than Republican Tom Pischke to represent the district in 2019–20.

== U.S. Senate campaign ==
On September 24, 2019, Ahlers filed a Statement of Organization to form a committee to run for the U.S. Senate in South Dakota. Ahlers was the Democratic nominee for U.S. Senate in South Dakota in the 2020 election, which he lost to Republican incumbent Mike Rounds by 66% to 34%.

== 2026 South Dakota gubernatorial campaign ==
In February 2026, Ahlers announced his candidacy for the Democratic nomination in the 2026 South Dakota gubernatorial election.

== Personal life ==
Ahlers is married to Amy. They have two children.

Party political offices
Preceded by Rick Weiland	Democratic nominee for U.S. Senator from South Dakota (Class 2); 2020	Succeeded by Julian Beaudion; Withdrew
Preceded by Jamie Smith	Democratic nominee for Governor of South Dakota; 2026	Most recent
