= James W. Abbott =

American politician and academic

Jim Abbott

President of the University of South Dakota
- In office July 1, 1997 – June 21, 2018
- Preceded by: Betty Asher
- Succeeded by: Sheila Gestring

Member of the South Dakota House of Representatives from the 18th district
- In office 1991–1993

Personal details
- Born: June 12, 1948 (age 78) Sioux City, Iowa, U.S.
- Party: Democratic
- Spouse: Colette Pugh (m. 1987; died 2016)
- Children: 1
- Education: University of South Dakota (BA, JD)

James W. Abbott (born June 12, 1948) is an American retired politician and academic, most recently serving as the president of the University of South Dakota from 1997 to 2018. Abbott was the Democratic nominee in the 2002 South Dakotan gubernatorial election. Abbott is a distinguished alumni of the Lambda Chi Alpha Fraternity.

== Career and politics ==
Abbott is a businessman and former politician. He represented Yankton County in the South Dakota State Legislature from 1991 to 1993. In 1994, Abbott was the Democratic nominee for Lieutenant Governor on the ticket with gubernatorial candidate Jim Beddow, a former president of Dakota Wesleyan University. The ticket was defeated by Republicans Bill Janklow and Carole Hillard. He was the Democratic nominee for Governor of South Dakota in 2002, but lost to Republican Mike Rounds. Abbott also mounted an unsuccessful bid for the Democratic nomination for U.S. House of Representatives in 1996, losing the nomination to Rick Weiland.

== Academic career ==
Abbott was named president of his alma mater, the University of South Dakota, in 1997. Abbott received his bachelor's degree in 1970 and his Juris Doctor in 1974 from University of South Dakota School of Law.

== South Dakota gubernatorial election, 2002 ==
In 2002, Abbott took a leave of absence from the presidency to seek to Democratic nomination for Governor of South Dakota. He won the Democratic primary against State Senators Ron J. Volesky and Jim Hutmacher. He was defeated in the general election by Republican Mike Rounds.

== Return to academia ==
After the election, Abbott returned to the presidency of the University of South Dakota.

In June 2007, Abbott took a leave of absence to donate a kidney to USD Chief diversity officer Bruce King at The Mayo Clinic in Rochester, Minn. The surgery was successful and Abbott returned to work two weeks later. He is a member of Lambda Chi Alpha fraternity.

Party political offices
Preceded by Shirley Halleen	Democratic nominee for Lieutenant Governor of South Dakota; 1994	Succeeded by Elsie Meeks
Preceded by Bernie Hunhoff	Democratic nominee for Governor of South Dakota; 2002	Succeeded by Jack Billion
