= Helena Hassard =

American politician

Member of the South Dakota House of Representatives from the 30th district
- In office January 10, 1995 – January 12, 1999
- Succeeded by: Mike Koehn; Jim Lintz

Personal details
- Born: December 18, 1930 Rotterdam, Netherlands
- Died: July 19, 2009 (aged 78) Port Aransas, Texas
- Party: Republican

Helena Hassard (December 18, 1930 – July 19, 2009) was an American politician who served in the South Dakota House of Representatives from the 30th district from 1995 to 1999.

She died on July 19, 2009, in Port Aransas, Texas at age 78.
