= Vitter =

Vitter may refer to:

== People ==
- David Vitter (born 1961), American politician from Louisiana
- Drue Vitter (1942–2004), American politician from South Dakota
- Jeffrey Vitter (born 1955), American university administrator
- Wendy Vitter (born 1961), American federal judge from Louisiana

== Other ==
- Vittra (folklore), singular form vitter, a creature found in Scandinavian folklore
