= Mike Rounds =

American businessman and politician (born 1954)

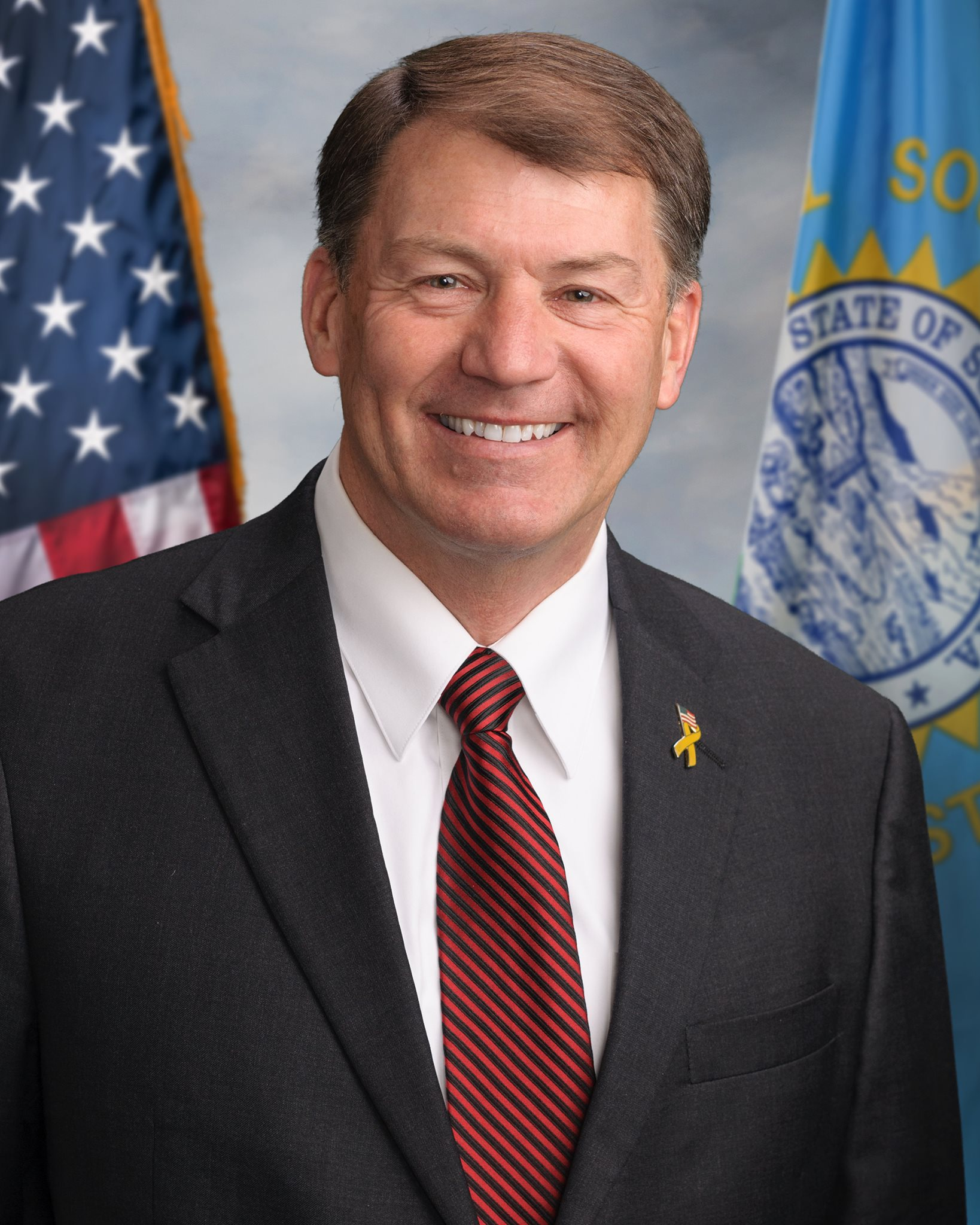
- Official portrait, 2015

United States Senator from South Dakota
- Incumbent
- Assumed office January 3, 2015 Serving with John Thune
- Preceded by: Tim Johnson

31st Governor of South Dakota
- In office January 7, 2003 – January 8, 2011
- Lieutenant: Dennis Daugaard
- Preceded by: Bill Janklow
- Succeeded by: Dennis Daugaard

Member of the South Dakota Senate from the 24th district
- In office January 3, 1991 – January 3, 2001
- Preceded by: Jacquie Kelley
- Succeeded by: Patricia de Hueck

Personal details
- Born: Marion Michael Rounds; October 24, 1954 (age 72) Huron, South Dakota, U.S.
- Party: Republican
- Spouse: Jean Vedvei (m. 1978; died 2021)
- Children: 4
- Relatives: Tim Rounds (brother)
- Education: South Dakota State University (BS)
- Website: Senate website Campaign website
- Rounds's voice Rounds on Native American housing safety Recorded July 20, 2021

Marion Michael Rounds (born October 24, 1954) is an American businessman and politician serving as the junior United States senator from South Dakota since 2015. A member of the Republican Party, he served as the 31st governor of South Dakota from 2003 to 2011.

Rounds was raised in Pierre, South Dakota. He attended South Dakota State University, where he earned his Bachelor of Science degree. He was elected to the South Dakota Senate in 1990, representing the 24th district until 2001. Rounds ran for governor of South Dakota in 2002, and after an upset victory in the Republican primary, won the general election. He was reelected in 2006.

In 2014, Rounds was elected to the United States Senate, succeeding retiring Democrat Tim Johnson. He was reelected in 2020 and 2026.

== Early life, education, and business career ==
The eldest of 11 children, Rounds was born in Huron, South Dakota, the son of Joyce (née Reinartz) and Don Rounds. He has German, Belgian, Swedish and English ancestry. Rounds has lived in the state capital of Pierre since he was three years old. He was named for an uncle, Marion Rounds, who was killed in the Pacific theater during World War II. Several members of the Rounds family have been involved in state government. His father worked at various times as state director of highway safety, a staffer for the Rural Electrification Administration, and executive director of the South Dakota Petroleum Council. His brother Tim Rounds was a member of the South Dakota House of Representatives, representing District 24, which includes Pierre, from 2003 to 2011 and from 2013 to 2021.

Rounds attended South Dakota State University in Brookings, where he earned his Bachelor of Science in political science.

Rounds is a former partner in Fischer Rounds & Associates, an insurance and real estate firm with offices in Pierre, Rapid City, Mitchell, Watertown and Sioux Falls.

== South Dakota Senate (1991-2001) ==
=== Elections ===
Rounds represented District 24, which was based in Pierre. In 1990, he defeated incumbent state Senator Jacqueline Kelley, 53%–47%. He was reelected in 1992 (60%), 1994 (77%), 1996 (66%), and 1998 (75%). Rounds had to leave the Senate in 2001 because of legislative term limits South Dakota voters had passed in 1992.

=== Tenure ===
Rounds represented Hughes, Lyman, Stanley, and Sully counties. In 1993, he became Senate Minority Whip. In 1995, his peers selected him to be Senate Majority Leader.

=== Committee assignments ===
- Commerce
- Education
- Legislative Procedure
- Local Government
- Retirement Laws
- State Affairs
- Taxation

== Governor of South Dakota (2003-2011) ==
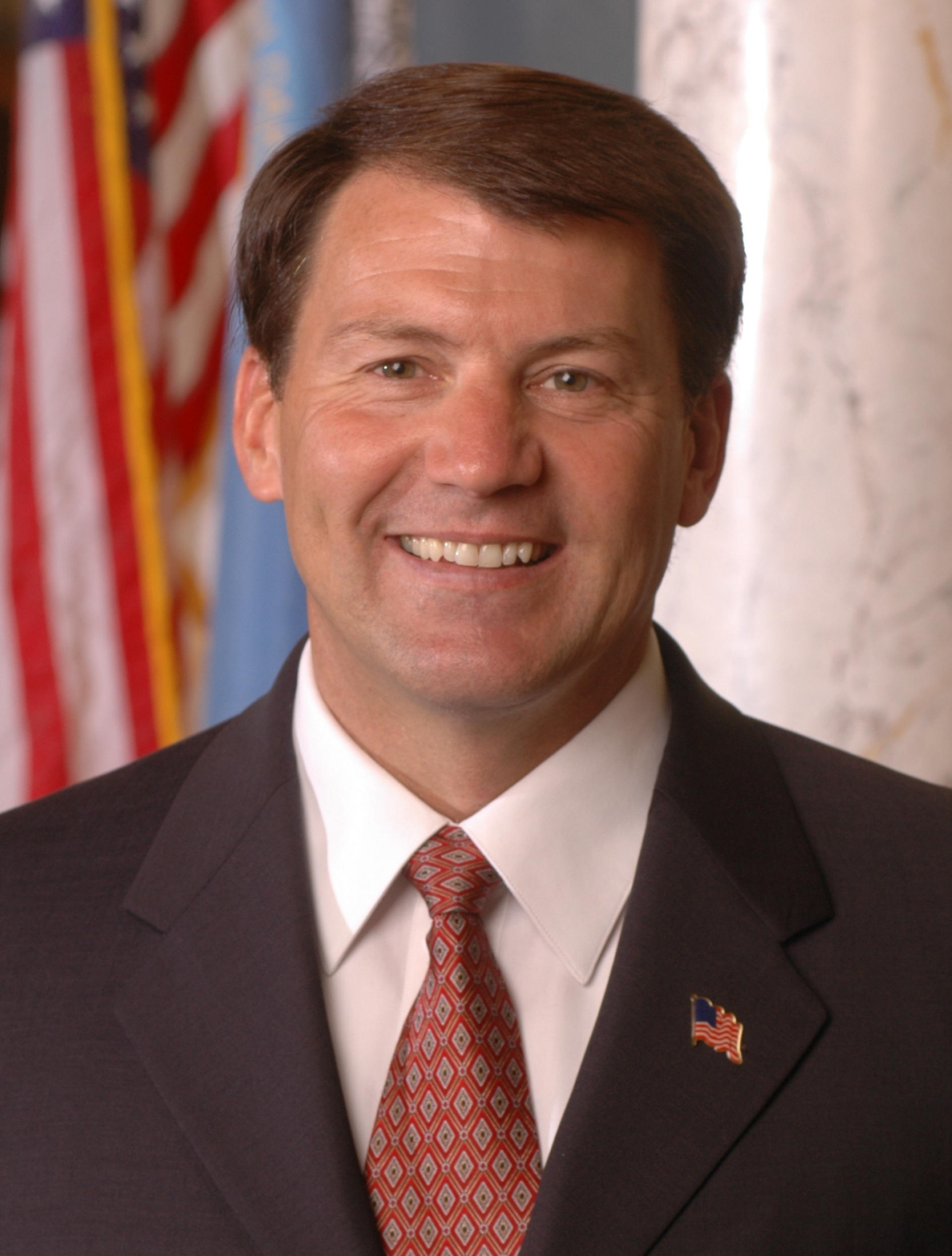
Governor Mike Rounds (2004)

=== Elections ===
==== 2002 ====
As the 2002 race for governor took shape, media and political observers largely dismissed Rounds as an extreme long shot. Until late 2001, then-Congressman John Thune was the front-runner for the nomination. When Thune passed on the race to challenge Senator Tim Johnson, state Attorney General Mark Barnett and former Lieutenant Governor Steve T. Kirby became candidates.

Rounds benefited from the heated competition between Kirby and Barnett, much of which centered on ethical concerns about Kirby's personal business investments and damaged both candidates' reputations, with Barnett's campaign advertisements involving claims "so outlandish that people thought for sure that they were exaggerated or completely fabricated". By staying above the fray, Rounds won the primary by 15 points.

After winning the Republican nomination, Rounds chose State Senator Dennis Daugaard of Dell Rapids as his running mate. Their Democratic opponents were University of South Dakota President Jim Abbott of Vermillion and his running mate, former State Representative Mike Wilson of Rapid City.

Rounds was elected governor on November 5, 2002. The results were as follows:

- Republicans: Rounds and Daugaard, 56.8%
- Democrats: Abbott and Wilson, 41.9%
- Independent: Jim Carlson and Ron Bosch, 0.7%
- Libertarians: Nathan Barton and Eric Risty, 0.6%

==== 2006 ====
Two Democratic candidates emerged to challenge Rounds: Jack Billion, a retired surgeon and former state legislator from Sioux Falls, and Dennis Wiese, the former president of the South Dakota Farmers Union. Billion easily won the nomination and selected Rapid City school board member Eric Abrahamson as his running mate.

The Rounds/Daugaard ticket was reelected on November 7, 2006. The results were as follows:

- Republicans: Rounds and Daugaard, 61.7%
- Democrats: Billion and Abrahamson, 36.1%
- Constitution: Steven J. Willis and Larry Johnsen, 1.2%
- Libertarians: Tom Gerber and Betty Rose Ryan, 1.0%

=== Tenure ===
Rounds served as a member of the Governors' Council at the Bipartisan Policy Center. He was the 2008 Chair of the Midwestern Governors Association.

== Political positions ==
=== Research centers ===
Rounds's 2010 Initiative established ten research centers at state-supported universities. In the program's first four years, the state's first five research centers generated an estimated $59 million in federal and private funding, with an estimated $110 million economic impact.

=== Abortion ===
On February 22, 2006, the South Dakota Legislature passed an act banning all medical abortions except those necessary to save the mother's life. Rounds signed the act on March 6 and the ban was to have taken effect on July 1, 2006, but did not, because of a court challenge. A referendum on repealing H.B. 1215 was placed on the ballot for the November 2006 statewide election due to a petition. On May 30, over 38,000 signatures were filed, more than twice the 17,000 required to qualify. Voters repealed the law on November 7, 2006, the day of Rounds's reelection.

=== EB-5 Visa inquiry ===
During Rounds's administration, South Dakota offered green cards to foreign investors in exchange for investments in a new South Dakota beef packing plant and other economic investments through the EB-5 visa program the federal government established in 1990. After the beef packing plant went bankrupt, questions emerged about the nature of the investments and the foreign investors. Some investors received neither their EB-5 visas nor the money back from their failed investments, with no indication as to where their money went.

State officials misused funds to pay for their salaries, did not disclose that they owned companies which they gave contracts to, directed money to companies that went bankrupt and arranged for loans from unknown sources from shell companies located in tax havens. In October 2014, Rounds admitted that he had approved a $1 million state loan to beef packing plant Northern Beef shortly after learning that Secretary of Tourism and State Development Richard Benda had agreed to join the company, with Benda then getting another $600,000 in state loans that was ultimately used to pay his own salary. Benda committed suicide in October 2013, days before a possible indictment over embezzlement and grand theft charges.

=== 3D-printed weapons ===
Of 3D-printed weapons, Rounds has said, "This is a new technology which you're not going to put back into the bottle. It is there." He has suggested creating and using new technologies, such as metal detectors that can also recognize plastic, in schools, airports and other public places.

== U.S. Senate (2015-present) ==
=== Election ===
==== 2014 ====
Speculation persisted that in 2014 Rounds would seek the United States Senate seat held by Tim Johnson, a Democrat who had served since 1997. Johnson opted not to run for reelection.

On November 29, 2012, Rounds launched a campaign for the seat being vacated by Johnson's retirement. He won the June 2014 Republican primary, defeating four other candidates. Early polls showed Rounds leading by a 2–1 margin against Democratic opponent Rick Weiland. October 2014 polls showed a closer three-way race between Rounds, Weiland, and independent former Senator Larry Pressler. Independent conservative former state legislator Gordon Howie was also in the race.

In November Rounds was elected with a majority of the vote. The results were:

- Republican: Rounds, 50.37%
- Democrat: Weiland, 29.51%
- Independent: Pressler, 17.09%
- Independent: Howie, 3.03%

==== 2020 ====
In the 2020 election, Scyller Borglum, a first-term member of the South Dakota House of Representatives, challenged Rounds in the Republican primary. Borglum positioned herself as an ally of Donald Trump. Rounds defeated Borglum, 75% to 25%. He won the general election against Democratic nominee Dan Ahlers with nearly 66% of the vote.

==== 2026 ====
On July 21, 2025, Trump endorsed Rounds for reelection on Truth Social, writing, "Mike Rounds has my Complete and Total Endorsement for Re-election – HE WILL NEVER LET YOU DOWN!" He won re-nomination in the Republican primary and faces independent candidate Brian Bengs in the 2026 general election.

=== Tenure ===
==== Artificial Intelligence ====
Rounds co-chairs the Senate AI Caucus and was one of the four members of the Bipartisan Senate AI Working Group led by Senate Minority Leader Chuck Schumer. On May 15, 2024, the group released a report recommending actions for the federal government to take to regulate and support AI development. The report recommended $32 billion of annual funding for development of non-defense AI.

==== Education ====
In February 2019, Rounds was one of 20 senators to sponsor the Employer Participation in Repayment Act, enabling employers to contribute up to $5,250 to their employees' student loans as a means of granting them relief and incentivizing people to apply for jobs with employers who implement the policy. In November 2024, he introduced a bill in the Senate that proposes the abolishment of the Department of Education.

==== Environment ====
In 2017, Rounds was one of 22 senators to sign a letter to President Donald Trump urging him to withdraw the United States from the Paris Agreement. According to OpenSecrets, Rounds has received over $200,000 from oil, gas and coal interests since 2012. Rounds supported embattled Environmental Protection Agency Administrator Scott Pruitt, who had come under scrutiny because of extraordinary expenditures for personal security and luxury travel, and the appearances of ethical conflicts, defending him on Meet the Press. Calling the criticism "nitpicking", he said, "I don't know how much of it is overblown and how much of it is accurate, to be honest."

==== Criminal justice ====
Rounds opposed the FIRST STEP Act, a bipartisan criminal justice reform bill that Trump signed into law. The bill passed 87–12 on December 18, 2018.

==== Israel Anti-Boycott Act ====
In March 2018, Rounds co-sponsored the Israel Anti-Boycott Act (s. 720), which would make it a federal crime for Americans to encourage or participate in boycotts against Israel and Israeli settlements in the West Bank if protesting actions by the Israeli government.

==== Health care ====
Rounds opposes the Affordable Care Act (also known as Obamacare), and has voted to repeal it. In 2019, he said he supported lawsuits seeking to overturn it.

==== 2020 presidential election ====
On January 9, 2022, Rounds said that the 2020 presidential election was not stolen from Donald Trump: "[We] looked at over 60 different accusations made in multiple states. While there were some irregularities, there were none of the irregularities which would have risen to the point where they would have changed the vote outcome in a single state". Rounds said the election was fair, and added that Republicans should stop making arguments to the contrary: "If we simply look back and tell our people, 'Don't vote because there's cheating going on,' then we're going to put ourselves in a huge disadvantage. So, moving forward, let's focus on what it takes to win those elections. We can do that." Trump responded by calling Rounds a "jerk", "crazy" and "stupid" and accused him of being "woke" for acknowledging the election results.

==== 2021 United States Capitol attack ====
On May 28, 2021, Rounds abstained from voting on the creation of the January 6 commission.

==== 2024 presidential election ====
Rounds endorsed Senator Tim Scott for the Republican nomination in the 2024 United States presidential election. In an interview on Meet the Press, Rounds refused to commit to supporting the eventual Republican nominee if Scott was not nominated. Scott suspended his campaign on November 12, 2023, and not long after, Rounds endorsed Trump.

=== Committee assignments, 119th Congress ===
- Committee on Appropriations
  - Subcommittee on Agriculture, Rural Development, Food and Drug Administration, and Related Agencies
  - Subcommittee on Energy and Water Development
  - Subcommittee on Interior, Environment, and Related Agencies
  - Subcommittee on Labor, Health and Human Services, Education, and Related Agencies
  - Subcommittee on Legislative Branch
  - Subcommittee on Military Construction, Veterans Affairs, and Related Agencies
- Committee on Armed Services
  - Subcommittee on Cybersecurity (Chair)
  - Subcommittee on Emerging Threats and Capabilities
  - Subcommittee on Strategic Forces
- Committee on Banking, Housing, and Urban Affairs
  - Subcommittee on Securities, Insurance, and Investment (Chair)
  - Subcommittee on Economic Policy
  - Subcommittee on Housing, Transportation, and Community Development
- Committee on Indian Affairs
- Select Committee on Intelligence

=== Caucus memberships ===
- Congressional Motorcycle Caucus
- Senate Taiwan Caucus

== Personal life ==
While attending South Dakota State University, Rounds met Jean Vedvei, formerly of Lake Preston, South Dakota. They married in 1978 and had four children. On November 2, 2021, Jean Rounds died at age 65, two years after she was diagnosed with cancer.

Rounds is the older brother of Tim Rounds, a former member of the South Dakota House of Representatives.

Rounds is a member of Sts. Peter and Paul Catholic Church of Pierre. He is also a member of numerous service clubs and community organizations, including Elks, Exchange Club, Knights of Columbus and Ducks Unlimited.

=== Honors ===
In May 2011, Rounds's alma mater, South Dakota State University, gave him an honorary doctorate for public service.

== Electoral history ==
=== South Dakota State Senate ===
South Dakota State Senate District 24 election, 1990
Primary election
Party	Candidate	Votes	%
Republican	Mike Rounds	2,188	62.69
Republican	Kent Bowers	1,302	37.31
Total votes		3,490	100.00
General election
Republican	Mike Rounds	4,790	52.54
Democratic	Jacquie Kelly (incumbent)	4,326	47.46
Total votes		9,116	100.00
Republican gain from Democratic			

South Dakota State Senate District 24 election, 1992
Party	Candidate	Votes	%
Republican	Mike Rounds (incumbent)	6,591	59.93
Democratic	Rick Riggle	4,406	40.07
Total votes		10,997	100.00
Republican hold			

South Dakota State Senate District 24 election, 1994
Party	Candidate	Votes	%
Republican	Mike Rounds (incumbent)	8,270	77.35
independent (politician)	Mary Morin	2,421	22.65
Total votes		10,691	100.00
Republican hold			

South Dakota State Senate District 24 election, 1996
Party	Candidate	Votes	%
Republican	Mike Rounds (incumbent)	7,070	66.01
Democratic	Kenneth Meyer	3,641	33.99
Total votes		9,711	100.00
Republican hold			

South Dakota State Senate District 24 election, 1998
Party	Candidate	Votes	%
Republican	Mike Rounds (incumbent)	7,374	74.93
Democratic	Robert Hockett	2,467	25.07
Total votes		9,841	100.00
Republican hold			

=== South Dakota Governor ===
2002 South Dakota gubernatorial election
Primary election
Party	Candidate	Votes	%
Republican	Mike Rounds	49,331	44.34
Republican	Mark Barnett	32,868	29.54
Republican	Steve T. Kirby	29,065	26.12
Total votes		111,264	100.00
General election
Republican	Mike Rounds	189,920	56.77
Democratic	Jim Abbott	140,263	41.92
independent (politician)	James Carlson	2,393	0.72
Libertarian	Nathan Barton	1,983	0.59
Total votes		334,559	100.00
Republican hold			

2006 South Dakota gubernatorial election
Party	Candidate	Votes	%
Republican	Mike Rounds (incumbent)	206,990	61.69
Democratic	Jack Billion	121,226	36.13
Constitution	Steven Willis	4,010	1.20
Libertarian	Tom Gerber	3,282	0.98
Total votes		335,508	100.00
Republican hold			

=== U.S. Senator ===
2014 United States Senate election in South Dakota
Primary election
Party	Candidate	Votes	%
Republican	Mike Rounds	41,377	55.54
Republican	Larry Rhoden	13,593	18.25
Republican	Stace Nelson	13,179	17.69
Republican	Annette Bosworth	4,283	5.75
Republican	Jason Ravnsborg	2,066	2.77
Total votes		74,498	100.00
General election
Republican	Mike Rounds	140,741	50.37
Democratic	Rick Weiland	82,456	29.51
independent (politician)	Larry Pressler	47,741	17.09
independent (politician)	Gordon Howie	8,474	3.03
Total votes		279,412	100.00
Republican gain from Democratic			

2020 United States Senate election in South Dakota
Primary election
Party	Candidate	Votes	%
Republican	Mike Rounds (incumbent)	70,365	75.23
Republican	Scyller Borglum	23,164	24.77
Total votes		93,529	100.00
General election
Republican	Mike Rounds (incumbent)	276,232	65.74
Democratic	Dan Ahlers	143,987	34.26
Total votes		420,219	100.00
Republican hold			

Party political offices
Preceded by Bill Janklow	Republican nominee for Governor of South Dakota; 2002, 2006	Succeeded by Dennis Daugaard
Preceded by Joel Dykstra	Republican nominee for U.S. Senator from South Dakota (Class 2); 2014, 2020, 2026	Most recent
Political offices
Preceded by Bill Janklow	Governor of South Dakota; 2003–2011	Succeeded by Dennis Daugaard
U.S. Senate
Preceded by Tim Johnson	U.S. Senator (Class 2) from South Dakota; 2015–present Served alongside: John Thune	Incumbent
U.S. order of precedence (ceremonial)
Preceded by Shelley Moore Capito	Order of precedence of the United States as United States Senator	Succeeded by Steve Daines
Preceded by Steve Daines	United States senators by seniority 52nd	Succeeded by Thom Tillis
