= Scyller Borglum =

American politician

Member of the South Dakota House of Representatives from the 32nd district
- In office August 8, 2018 – January 12, 2021
- Preceded by: Sean McPherson
- Succeeded by: Becky Drury

Personal details
- Born: June 19, 1977 (age 49)
- Party: Republican
- Spouse: Timothy Masterlark (m. 2018)
- Education: Pacific Lutheran University (BBA); Duke Divinity School (MTS); Montana Technological University (MA); South Dakota School of Mines and Technology (MA, PhD)
- Occupation: engineer

Scyller J. Borglum (born June 19, 1977) is an American politician and engineer from the state of South Dakota. A Republican, Borglum served in the South Dakota House of Representatives for the 32nd district from 2018 to 2021.

Borglum unsuccessfully ran to represent South Dakota in U.S. Senate in 2020, losing the Republican primary to incumbent Mike Rounds.

== Early life, education, and career ==
Borglum is from Great Falls, Montana. She graduated from Charles M. Russell High School in 1995, where she was class president and governor of the Montana Youth Legislature. Borglum attended Pacific Lutheran University, where she earned a Bachelor of Business Administration. She received a Fulbright Scholarship, which she used to study oil and gas development in Oslo, Norway.

After her brother, Troy, died in a traffic collision, Borglum went to Duke Divinity School, and earned a master's degree in theological studies (MTS) in 2003. She then worked in pharmaceutical sales in Oregon and Texas.

Borglum attended Montana Technological University, where she earned a master's degree in petroleum engineering. She then enrolled at the South Dakota School of Mines and Technology to earn a doctoral degree in geology and geological engineering, while working as a production engineer in an oil field in North Dakota. She also enrolled at Montana Tech to earn a bachelor's degree in engineering, which she needed to become a licensed engineer. She was laid off from her job in 2015, and moved to South Dakota, where she works as a staff engineer at RESPEC.

== Political career ==
In the 2018 elections, Borglum ran to represent the 32nd district in the South Dakota House of Representatives. She and Sean McPherson earned the Republican Party's nomination for the district's two seats, even though McPherson, an incumbent, had died of cancer. Governor Dennis Daugaard appointed Borglum to fill McPherson's vacant seat on August 8. She was elected to a full term in November.

Borglum ran in the Republican primary for the United States Senate against incumbent Mike Rounds in the 2020 election. She positioned herself as an ally of then-President Donald Trump. She accused U.S. Representative Dusty Johnson of having worked to intimidate her on Rounds' behalf to keep her out of the Senate race. Rounds defeated Borglum, 75% to 25%.

== Post-political career ==
Borglum recently was hired by Westlake Petrochemical as a Salt/Brine expert as of September 2025. Borglum was vice president for underground storage at WSP Global, an engineering firm through 2025 In 2024, Borglum authored the book STEM Study Habits: Successfully Navigate Math, Science, Engineering, and Life for Your Degree.

== Personal life ==
Borglum married Timothy Masterlark, a professor at the South Dakota School of Mines and Technology, in 2018.
