= Sean McPherson =

American politician (1970–2018)

Member of the South Dakota House of Representatives from the 32nd district
- In office 2017 – April 26, 2018 Serving with Kristin Conzet
- Preceded by: Brian Gosch
- Succeeded by: Scyller Borglum

Personal details
- Born: November 23, 1970 Goose Creek, South Carolina, U.S.
- Died: April 26, 2018 (aged 47) Rapid City, South Dakota, U.S.
- Party: Republican

Military service
- Branch/service: United States Navy

Sean Patrick McPherson (November 23, 1970 – April 26, 2018) was an American politician, pastor, and educator who served as a member of the South Dakota House of Representatives from 2017 until his death in April 2018.

== Early life ==
McPherson was born in Goose Creek, South Carolina. After his father's retirement from the United States Navy, McPherson and his family lived in Newton, Kansas. He enlisted in the navy after graduating high school.

== Career ==
After leaving the navy, McPherson worked for Intel in Rio Rancho, New Mexico. He later taught at Rapid City Christian School and worked as pastor of the Real Life Church in Rapid City. He was elected to the South Dakota House of Representatives in 2017 as a Republican.

In the 2018 elections, McPherson and Scyller Borglum earned the Republican Party's nomination for the 32nd district's two seats, even though McPherson had died of cancer. Governor Dennis Daugaard appointed Borglum to fill McPherson's vacant seat on August 8.

== Personal life ==
In February 2017, McPherson was diagnosed with cancer. He died on April 26, 2018, in Rapid City, South Dakota.
