= 2006 South Dakota gubernatorial election =

- November 7, 2006
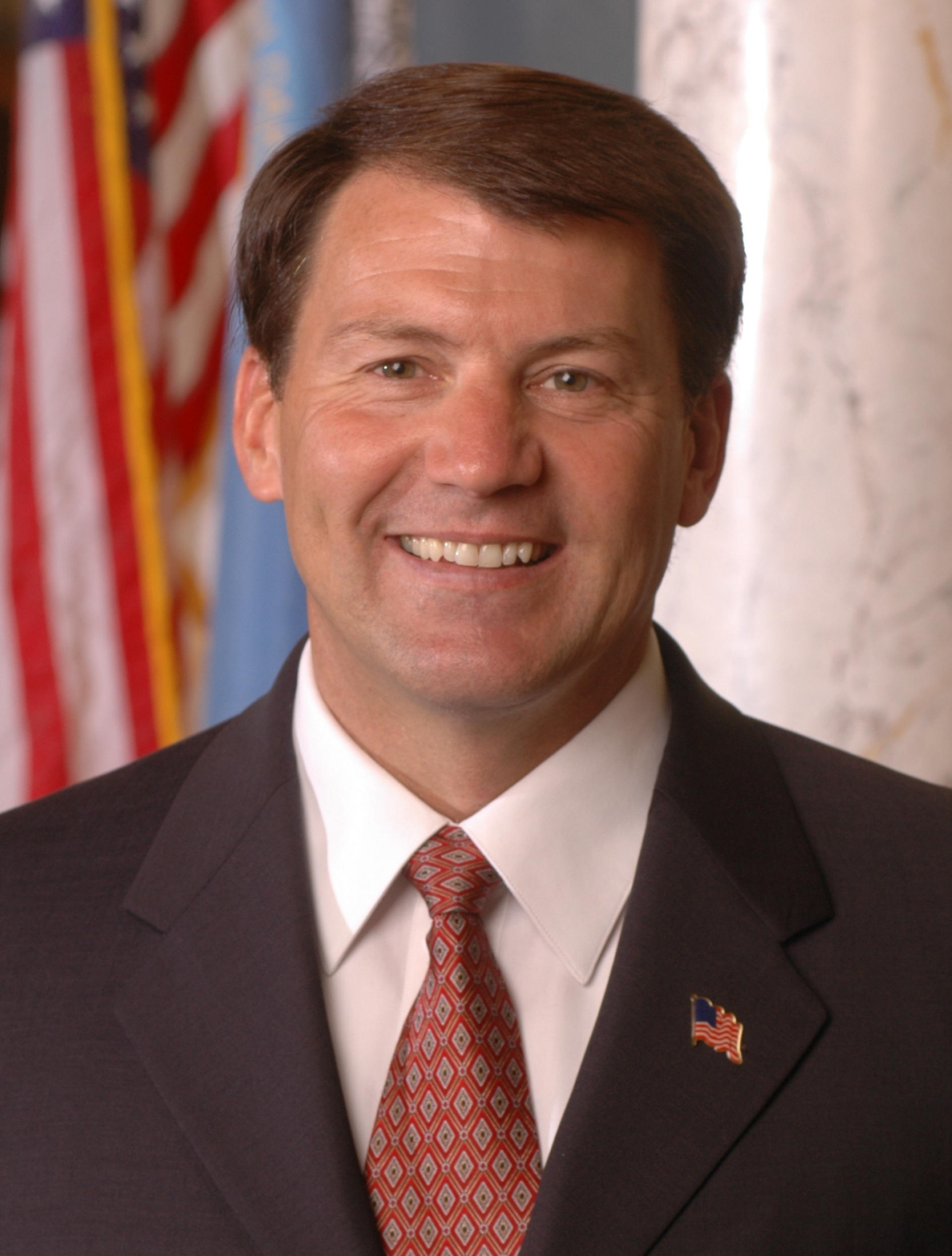

Nominee	Mike Rounds	Jack Billion
Party	Republican	Democratic
Running mate	Dennis Daugaard	Eric Abrahamson
Popular vote	206,990	121,226
Percentage	61.69%	36.13%
- County results Rounds: 50–60% 60–70% 70–80% 80–90% Billion: 40–50% 50–60% 60–70%
Governor before election
Mike Rounds
Republican
Elected Governor
Mike Rounds
Republican

The 2006 South Dakota gubernatorial election was held on November 7, 2006. Incumbent Republican Governor Mike Rounds defeated Democrat Jack Billion to serve a second term as governor.

== Democratic primary ==
=== Candidates ===
- Jack Billion, former South Dakota state representative
- Dennis Weise, president of the South Dakota Farmers Union

=== Results ===
Democratic primary results
Party	Candidate	Votes	%
Democratic	Jack Billion	22,527	61.91
Democratic	Dennis Weise	13,862	38.09
Total votes		36,389	100.00

== Republican primary ==
=== Candidates ===
- Mike Rounds, incumbent governor of South Dakota

=== Results ===
Rounds faced no opposition in the Republican primary.

== Minor parties ==
=== Libertarian Party ===
- Tom Gerber

=== Constitution Party ===
- Steven J. Willis, small business owner, Navy veteran, conservative activist

== General election ==
=== Predictions ===
Source	Ranking	As of
The Cook Political Report	Solid R	November 6, 2006
Sabato's Crystal Ball	Safe R	November 6, 2006
Rothenberg Political Report	Safe R	November 2, 2006
Real Clear Politics	Safe R	November 6, 2006

=== Election results ===
South Dakota gubernatorial election, 2006
Party	Candidate	Votes	%	±%
Republican	Mike Rounds (incumbent)	206,990	61.69%	+4.93%
Democratic	Jack Billion	121,226	36.13%	−5.79%
Constitution	Steven J. Willis	4,010	1.20%	
Libertarian	Tom Gerber	3,282	0.98%	+0.39%
Majority		85,764	25.56%	+10.72%
Turnout		335,508		
Republican hold		Swing		

==== Counties that flipped from Democratic to Republican ====
- Day (largest city: Webster)
- Roberts (largest city: Sisseton)
- Ziebach (largest city: Dupree)
- Corson (largest city: McLaughlin)
- Dewey (largest city: North Eagle Butte)
- Bennett (largest city: Martin)
- Yankton (largest city: Yankton)

== See also ==
- 2006 United States gubernatorial elections
