= James L. Stoick =

American politician

Member of the South Dakota Senate from the 25th district
- In office 1985–1992
- Preceded by: Jack Manke
- Succeeded by: Eleanor Saukerson

Member of the South Dakota Senate from the 20th district
- In office 1979–1984
- Preceded by: LeRoy G. Hoffman
- Succeeded by: Leonard E. Andera

Member of the South Dakota House of Representatives from the 25th district
- In office 1975–1978

Personal details
- Born: March 14, 1919
- Died: October 16, 2004 (aged 85) Mobridge, South Dakota
- Party: Republican

James L. Stoick (March 14, 1919 – October 16, 2004) was an American politician.

Born in 1914, Stoick worked as a grocer. He served three years in the South Dakota House of Representatives from 1975 to 1978. Stoick ran for the South Dakota Senate and was seated in 1979. He stepped down in 1992, and died in Mobridge, South Dakota on October 16, 2004, aged 85.
