= Canova, South Dakota =

- Town
- Location in Miner County and the state of South Dakota
- Coordinates: 43°52′53″N 97°30′06″W
- Country: United States
- State: South Dakota
- County: Miner
- Incorporated: 1898

Area
  - Total: 0.31 sq mi (0.81 km^{2})
  - Land: 0.31 sq mi (0.81 km^{2})
  - Water: 0 sq mi (0.00 km^{2})
- Elevation: 1,526 ft (465 m)

Population (2020)
  - Total: 89
  - Density: 283.2/sq mi (109.33/km^{2})
- Time zone: UTC-6 (Central (CST))
  - Summer (DST): UTC-5 (CDT)
- ZIP code: 57321
- Area code: 605
- FIPS code: 46-09420
- GNIS feature ID: 1267309

Canova is a town in Miner County, South Dakota, United States. The population was 89 at the 2020 census.

== History ==
Canova was platted in 1883. The town is named after Italian sculptor Antonio Canova.

Ted and Dorothy Hustead lived in Canova just before moving to Wall, South Dakota, and establishing the Wall Drug Store.

== Geography ==
According to the United States Census Bureau, the town has a total area of 0.31 square miles (0.80 km^{2}), all land.

== Demographics ==
Historical population
Census	Pop.	Note	%±
1900	169		—
1910	311		84.0%
1920	338		8.7%
1930	364		7.7%
1940	333		−8.5%
1950	340		2.1%
1960	247		−27.4%
1970	204		−17.4%
1980	194		−4.9%
1990	172		−11.3%
2000	140		−18.6%
2010	105		−25.0%
2020	89		−15.2%
U.S. Decennial Census

=== 2010 census ===
As of the census of 2010, there were 105 people, 47 households, and 24 families residing in the town. The population density was 338.7 inhabitants per square mile (130.8/km^{2}). There were 59 housing units at an average density of 190.3 per square mile (73.5/km^{2}). The racial makeup of the town was 98.1% White and 1.9% African American. Hispanic or Latino of any race were 7.6% of the population.

There were 47 households, of which 21.3% had children under the age of 18 living with them, 42.6% were married couples living together, 2.1% had a female householder with no husband present, 6.4% had a male householder with no wife present, and 48.9% were non-families. A single person aged 65 or older lived alone in 25.5% of all homes, which made up 44.7% of all households overall. There were 2.23 people per home and 3.17 people per family on average.

The median age in the town was 44.3 years. 21% of residents were under the age of 18; 9.6% were between the ages of 18 and 24; 21% were from 25 to 44; 27.7% were from 45 to 64; and 21% were 65 years of age or older. The gender makeup of the town was 47.6% male and 52.4% female.

=== 2000 census ===
As of the census of 2000, there were 140 people, 62 households, and 38 families residing in the town. The population density was 443.9 inhabitants per square mile (171.4/km^{2}). There were 72 housing units at an average density of 228.3 per square mile (88.1/km^{2}). The racial makeup of the town was 100.00% White.

There were 62 households, out of which 21.0% had children under the age of 18 living with them, 53.2% were married couples living together, 6.5% had a female householder with no husband present, and 38.7% were non-families. 33.9% of all households were made up of individuals, and 9.7% had someone living alone who was 65 years of age or older. The average household size was 2.26 and the average family size was 2.87.

In the town, the population was spread out, with 24.3% under the age of 18, 5.0% from 18 to 24, 28.6% from 25 to 44, 19.3% from 45 to 64, and 22.9% who were 65 years of age or older. The median age was 40 years. For every 100 females, there were 109.0 males. For every 100 females age 18 and over, there were 100.0 males.

The median income for a household in the town was $24,500, and the median income for a family was $33,750. Males had a median income of $33,438 versus $15,417 for females. The per capita income for the town was $14,624. There were 7.1% of families and 12.7% of the population living below the poverty line, including 32.3% of under eighteens and 8.1% of those over 64.

== Notable persons ==
- David Gassman - member for the 8th district of the South Dakota House of Representatives, 2003-2007
- Clarence L. Kooistra - member for the 9th district of the South Dakota House of Representatives from 1997-2003, and Senator for the 25th district of the South Dakota Senate from 2003-2007
- Gaylord Larsen - crime writer
