= John Anundson =

American politician

Member of the South Dakota House of Representatives
- In office 1949–1954

Personal details
- Born: November 20, 1891 Dell Rapids, South Dakota, U.S.
- Died: July 7, 1980 (aged 88) Volga, South Dakota, U.S.
- Party: Republican
- Spouse: Dagmar Christensen
- Children: 4

John Anundson (November 20, 1891 – July 7, 1980) was an American politician. He served as a Republican member of the South Dakota House of Representatives.

== Life and career ==
Anundson was born in Dell Rapids, South Dakota. He moved to Volga, South Dakota in 1914 and fought during World War I.

In 1949, Anundson was elected to the South Dakota House of Representatives, representing Brookings County, South Dakota, serving until 1954.

Anundson died in July 1980 at the White Care Center in Volga, South Dakota, at the age of 88.
