= Becky Drury =

Women state legislator in South Dakota

Member of the South Dakota House of Representatives
- In office January 12, 2021 – January 14, 2025 Serving with Mike Derby
- Preceded by: Scyller Borglum
- Succeeded by: Heather Baxter
- Constituency: 32nd district (2021–2024); 34th district (2024–present)

Personal details
- Born: November 24, 1958 (age 67)
- Party: Republican
- Education: University of South Dakota
- Profession: communications specialist and marketing coordinator

Becky Drury (born November 24, 1958) is an American politician who served as a Republican member of the South Dakota House of Representatives from January 12, 2021, to January 14, 2025.

Drury was originally elected to represent District 32, but in January 2024 she was appointed to fill a vacancy in District 34 after moving there.

== Election history ==
- In 2020, Drury was elected with 5,587 votes along with Rep. Chris P. Johnson who received 6,391 votes and they defeated James Preston who received 3,932 votes and Toni Diamond who received 3,826 votes.

2020 South Dakota House of Representatives District 32 General election
Party	Candidate	Votes	%
Republican	Chris P. Johnson (incumbent)	6,391	32.38%
Republican	Becky Drury	5,587	28.31%
Democratic	James Preston	3,932	19.92%
Democratic	Toni Diamond	3,826	19.39%
Total votes		19,736	100.0%
Republican hold			
Republican hold			
