= Jim Hutmacher =

American politician

Member of the South Dakota Senate from the 25th district
- In office 1995–2002
- Preceded by: Eleanor Saukerson
- Succeeded by: Clarence L. Kooistra

South Dakota Senate Minority Leader
- In office 1999–2002

South Dakota Senate Minority Whip
- In office 1997–1998

Personal details
- Born: September 24, 1953 (age 72)
- Party: Democratic
- Profession: Contractor

James K. Hutmacher (born September 24, 1953) is an American politician.

Born in 1953, Hutmacher worked as a well-drilling contractor. He served on the South Dakota Senate between 1995 and 2002. In December 2001, Hutmacher announced that he would contest the Democratic Party gubernatorial primary to be held in 2002, and won an early endorsement from Bernie Hunhoff. Ron J. Volesky was the second to join the race, followed by James W. Abbott and Robert Hockett. Hutmacher finished third in the primary. He was later named to the South Dakota Board of Water Management.
