= 2020 United States Senate election in South Dakota =

- November 3, 2020
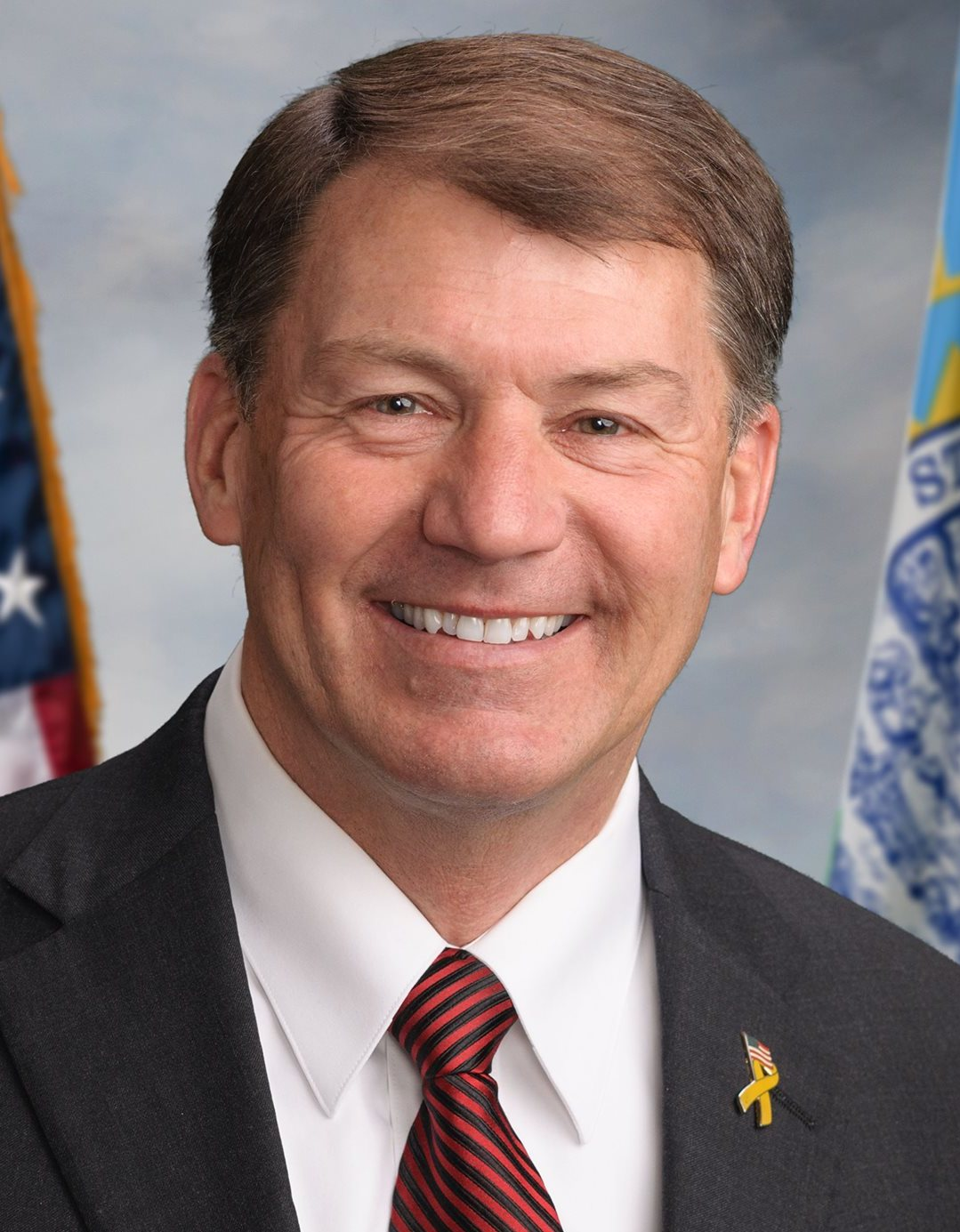

Nominee	Mike Rounds	Dan Ahlers
Party	Republican	Democratic
Popular vote	276,232	143,987
Percentage	65.74%	34.26%
- Rounds: 50–60% 60–70% 70–80% 80–90% >90% Ahlers: 50–60% 60–70% 70–80% 80–90% >90%
U.S. senator before election
Mike Rounds
Republican
Elected U.S. Senator
Mike Rounds
Republican

The 2020 United States Senate election in South Dakota was held on November 3, 2020, to elect a member of the United States Senate to represent the State of South Dakota, concurrently with the 2020 U.S. presidential election, as well as other elections to the United States Senate, elections to the United States House of Representatives and various state and local elections. Incumbent Republican Senator Mike Rounds was reelected to a second term in office, overperforming Donald Trump in the concurrent presidential election by 5.32 points.

== Republican primary ==
=== Candidates ===
==== Nominee ====
- Mike Rounds, incumbent U.S. senator

==== Eliminated in primary ====
- Scyller Borglum, state representative

=== Results ===
Results by county: Rounds: 50–60%; 60–70%; 70–80%; 80–90%; Borglum: 50–60%

Republican primary results
Party	Candidate	Votes	%
Republican	Mike Rounds (incumbent)	70,365	75.23%
Republican	Scyller Borglum	23,164	24.77%
Total votes		93,529	100.00%

== Democratic primary ==
=== Candidates ===
==== Nominee ====
- Daniel Ahlers, former state representative and former state senator

==== Did not qualify ====
- Clara Hart, board member of the Sioux Falls Arts Council

==== Declined ====
- Erin Healy, state representative
- Brendan Johnson, former United States Attorney for the District of South Dakota
- Billie Sutton, former minority leader of the South Dakota Senate and nominee for Governor of South Dakota in 2018
- Susan Wismer, state senator and Democratic nominee for Governor of South Dakota in 2014

== Independents ==
=== Candidates ===
==== Withdrew ====
- Clayton Walker, independent candidate in the 2014 United States Senate election in South Dakota and Democratic candidate in the 2010 South Dakota House of Representatives elections

== General election ==
=== Predictions ===
Source	Ranking	As of
The Cook Political Report	Safe R	October 29, 2020
Inside Elections	Safe R	October 28, 2020
Sabato's Crystal Ball	Safe R	November 2, 2020
Daily Kos	Safe R	October 30, 2020
Politico	Safe R	November 2, 2020
RCP	Safe R	October 23, 2020
DDHQ	Safe R	November 3, 2020
538	Safe R	November 2, 2020
Economist	Safe R	November 2, 2020

=== Polling ===
Poll source	Date(s) administered	Sample size (Note: Key: A – all adults RV – registered voters LV – likely voters V – unclear)	Margin of error	Mike Rounds (R)	Dan Ahlers (D)	Undecided
Nielson Brothers Polling	October 24–28, 2020	479 (LV)	± 4.48%	56%	39%	5%

=== Results ===
2020 United States Senate election in South Dakota
Party	Candidate	Votes	%	±%
Republican	Mike Rounds (incumbent)	276,232	65.74%	+15.37%
Democratic	Daniel Ahlers	143,987	34.26%	+4.75%
Total votes		420,219	100.00%	N/A
Republican hold				

==== By county ====
County	Mike Rounds Republican		Daniel Ahlers Democratic		Margin		Total votes
County	#	%	#	%	#	%	Total votes
Aurora	1,002	71.32	403	28.68	599	42.63	1,405
Beadle	5,104	71.99	1,986	28.01	3,118	43.98	7,090
Bennett	729	62.52	437	37.48	292	25.04	1,166
Bon Homme	2,156	72.11	834	27.89	1,322	44.21	2,990
Brookings	8,792	60.48	5,746	39.52	3,046	20.95	14,538
Brown	11,168	64.00	6,283	36.00	4,885	27.99	17,451
Brule	1,735	69.65	756	30.35	979	39.30	2,491
Buffalo	223	40.92	322	59.08	-99	-18.17	545
Butte	3,809	79.85	961	20.15	2,848	59.71	4,770
Campbell	745	85.93	122	14.07	623	71.86	867
Charles Mix	2,542	66.88	1,259	33.12	1,283	33.75	3,801
Clark	1,397	75.64	450	24.36	947	51.27	1,847
Clay	2,857	50.44	2,807	49.56	50	0.88	5,664
Codington	9,479	72.33	3,626	27.67	5,853	44.66	13,105
Corson	681	53.88	583	46.12	98	7.75	1,264
Custer	3,973	72.82	1,483	27.18	2,490	45.64	5,456
Davison	5,893	69.88	2,540	30.12	3,353	39.76	8,433
Day	1,895	63.93	1,069	36.07	826	27.87	2,964
Deuel	1,714	73.19	628	26.81	1,086	46.37	2,342
Dewey	884	45.43	1,062	54.57	-178	-9.15	1,946
Douglas	1,469	86.21	235	13.79	1,234	72.42	1,704
Edmunds	1,539	77.45	448	22.55	1,091	54.91	1,987
Fall River	3,009	75.19	993	24.81	2,016	50.37	4,002
Faulk	975	82.07	213	17.93	762	64.14	1,188
Grant	2,723	72.63	1,026	27.37	1,697	45.27	3,749
Gregory	1,766	78.35	488	21.65	1,278	56.70	2,254
Haakon	1,032	90.69	106	9.31	926	81.37	1,138
Hamlin	2,413	78.60	657	21.40	1,756	57.20	3,070
Hand	1,480	79.66	378	20.34	1,102	59.31	1,858
Hanson	1,796	76.10	564	23.90	1,232	52.20	2,360
Harding	727	90.88	73	9.13	654	81.75	800
Hughes	6,217	70.95	2,546	29.05	3,671	41.89	8,763
Hutchinson	2,982	79.44	772	20.56	2,210	58.87	3,754
Hyde	568	79.89	143	20.11	425	59.77	711
Jackson	756	67.92	357	32.08	399	35.85	1,113
Jerauld	720	72.22	277	27.78	443	44.43	997
Jones	497	83.39	99	16.61	398	66.78	596
Kingsbury	1,970	70.89	809	29.11	1,161	41.78	2,779
Lake	3,816	64.84	2,069	35.16	1,747	29.69	5,885
Lawrence	9,385	68.29	4,358	31.71	5,027	36.58	13,743
Lincoln	21,221	65.83	11,013	34.17	10,208	31.67	32,234
Lyman	1,066	66.67	533	33.33	533	33.33	1,599
Marshall	1,334	61.00	853	39.00	481	21.99	2,187
McCook	2,072	71.28	835	28.72	1,237	42.55	2,907
McPherson	1,086	82.21	235	17.79	851	64.42	1,321
Meade	10,355	76.53	3,176	23.47	7,179	53.06	13,531
Mellette	468	60.70	303	39.30	165	21.40	771
Miner	807	70.42	339	29.58	468	40.84	1,146
Minnehaha	52,773	57.63	38,799	42.37	13,974	15.26	91,572
Moody	1,877	58.29	1,343	41.71	534	16.58	3,220
Oglala Lakota	510	15.93	2,691	84.07	-2,181	-68.13	3,201
Pennington	37,694	66.27	19,184	33.73	18,510	32.54	56,878
Perkins	1,395	84.85	249	15.15	1,146	69.71	1,644
Potter	1,160	83.82	224	16.18	936	67.63	1,384
Roberts	2,529	58.87	1,767	41.13	762	17.74	4,296
Sanborn	898	76.17	281	23.83	617	52.33	1,179
Spink	2,178	68.84	986	31.16	1,192	37.67	3,164
Stanley	1,274	77.12	378	22.88	896	54.24	1,652
Sully	759	81.88	168	18.12	591	63.75	927
Todd	706	28.22	1,796	71.78	-1,090	-43.57	2,502
Tripp	2,188	81.34	502	18.66	1,686	62.68	2,690
Turner	3,416	75.21	1,126	24.79	2,290	50.42	4,542
Union	6,364	72.56	2,407	27.44	3,957	45.11	8,771
Walworth	2,040	79.53	525	20.47	1,515	59.06	2,565
Yankton	6,994	64.51	3,848	35.49	3,146	29.02	10,842
Ziebach	450	49.56	458	50.44	-8	-0.88	908
Totals	276,232	65.74	143,987	34.26	132,245	31.47	420,219

Counties that flipped from Democratic to Republican

- Clay (largest municipality: Vermillion)
- Day (largest municipality: Webster)
- Marshall (largest municipality: Britton)
- Mellette (largest municipality: White River)
- Roberts (largest municipality: Sisseton)
