= 1994 South Dakota gubernatorial election =

- November 8, 1994
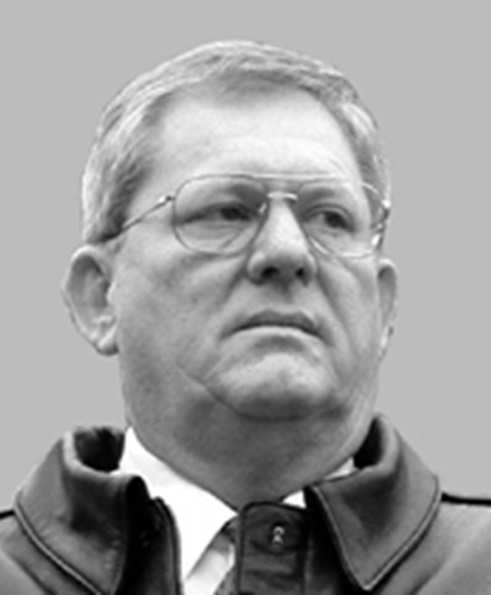

Nominee	Bill Janklow	Jim Beddow
Party	Republican	Democratic
Running mate	Carole Hillard	James W. Abbott
Popular vote	172,515	126,273
Percentage	55.36%	40.52%
- County results Janklow: 40–50% 50–60% 60–70% 70–80% Beddow: 50–60% 80–90%
Governor before election
Walter Dale Miller
Republican
Elected Governor
Bill Janklow
Republican

The 1994 South Dakota gubernatorial election, took place on November 8, 1994, to elect a Governor of South Dakota. Republican former Governor Bill Janklow was elected, defeating Democratic nominee Jim Beddow.

== Republican primary ==
=== Candidates ===
- Bill Janklow, former Governor of South Dakota
- Walter Dale Miller, incumbent Governor of South Dakota

=== Results ===
Republican primary results
Party	Candidate	Votes	%
Republican	Bill Janklow	57,221	53.99
Republican	Walter Dale Miller (incumbent)	48,754	46.01
Total votes		105,975	100.00

== Democratic primary ==
=== Candidates ===
- Jim Beddow, former Dakota Wesleyan University president
- Carrol V. Allen
- Jim Burg

=== Results ===
Democratic primary results
Party	Candidate	Votes	%
Democratic	Jim Beddow	29,082	55.45
Democratic	Carrol V. Allen	12,184	23.23
Democratic	Jim Burg	11,181	21.32
Total votes		52,447	100.00

== Third parties ==
=== Candidates ===
- Nathan A. Barton (Libertarian)

== General election ==
=== Results ===
South Dakota gubernatorial election, 1994
Party	Candidate	Votes	%	±%
Republican	Bill Janklow	172,515	55.36%	−3.54%
Democratic	Jim Beddow	126,273	40.52%	−0.59%
Libertarian	Nathan A. Barton	12,825	4.12%	+4.12%
Majority		46,242	14.84%	−2.95%
Turnout		311,613		
Republican hold		Swing		
