= Clarence L. Kooistra =

American politician

Member of the South Dakota Senate from the 25th district
- In office 2003–2006
- Preceded by: Jim Hutmacher
- Succeeded by: Arnie Hauge

Member of the South Dakota House of Representatives from the 25th district
- In office 1997–2002

Personal details
- Born: January 25, 1941 (age 85) Canova, South Dakota
- Party: Democratic, formerly Republican
- Spouse: Arlene Kay Fiskvik
- Children: two
- Profession: teacher

Clarence L. Kooistra (born January 25, 1941) is an American former politician. He served in the South Dakota House of Representatives from 1997 to 2002 and in the Senate from 2003 to 2006.

After losing renomination in 2006, Kooistra joined the South Dakota Democratic Party.
