= Arnie Hauge =

American politician

Member of the South Dakota Senate from the 25th district
- In office 2007–2008
- Preceded by: Clarence L. Kooistra
- Succeeded by: Dan Ahlers

Personal details
- Born: June 28, 1941 (age 85)
- Party: Republican
- Profession: Business Owner

Arlen Lee "Arnie" Hauge (born June 28, 1941) is an American former politician. He served in the South Dakota Senate from 2007 to 2008.
