= Jim Emery =

American politician (1934–2021)

James W. Emery

Member of the South Dakota Senate for the 30th district
- In office Appointed December 18, 1985 – 1996
- Preceded by: Jack Manke
- Succeeded by: Drue J. Vitter

Member of the South Dakota House of Representatives
- In office 1985

Personal details
- Born: January 24, 1934 Cheyenne Agency, South Dakota
- Died: December 10, 2021 (aged 87) Rapid City, South Dakota
- Party: Republican
- Spouse: Elaine Faye Ritchie
- Children: one
- Occupation: former power company manager

James William Emery (January 24, 1934 – December 10, 2021) was an American politician. He served in the South Dakota House of Representatives in 1985 and in the Senate from 1986 to 1996. He is a Cheyenne River Sioux.
