= Jack Billion =

American politician (1939–2023)

Member of the South Dakota House of Representatives from the 13th district
- In office January 1993 – January 1997

Personal details
- Born: March 4, 1939 Sioux Falls, South Dakota, U.S.
- Died: February 25, 2023 (aged 83) Sioux Falls, South Dakota, U.S.
- Party: Democratic
- Spouses: Linda Lambur (m. 1962); Deb Billion (m. 1980)
- Children: 7
- Education: Loras College (BS); Loyola University, Chicago (MD)

Military service
- Branch/service: United States Air Force
- Years of service: 1969–1971
- Rank: Major

John "Jack" Joseph Billion (March 4, 1939 – February 25, 2023) was an American politician and physician who was the 2006 Democratic Party candidate for Governor of South Dakota and served as a member of the South Dakota House of Representatives from the 13th district from 1993 to 1997.

== Early years ==
John Joseph Billion was born in Sioux Falls, South Dakota, on March 4, 1939. He was the third of nine children of Henry and Evelyn Billion.

== Education ==
Billion attended elementary and high school in Sioux Falls. He graduated from Cathedral High School in 1957. He received his BA degree from Loras College in Dubuque, Iowa and was admitted to the Loyola University Chicago in August 1960. He was awarded his Doctor of Medicine degree in 1964 and began his internship and residency training at St. Francis Hospital in Peoria, Illinois.

== Career ==
After completing his orthopedic residency in 1969, Billion served two years in the United States Air Force as a Major. He returned to Sioux Falls in 1971 to begin his orthopedic surgery practice. Billion practiced as a Board Certified Orthopedic Surgeon from 1971 through 1997.

Billion formerly chaired the Dakota Wesleyan University (DWU) Board of Trustees, and in 2013, he was awarded an honorary doctor of humane letters from DWU.

== Political career ==
In 1992, Billion was elected, along with fellow Democrat Linda Barker, as one of two South Dakota State Representatives from the Sioux Falls-based 13th District. Billion was re-elected in 1994. In 1996, Billion declined to seek a third term in the State House, instead choosing to run for the State Senate from the 13th District. However, he lost to Republican Kermit Staggers by an 876-vote margin. In 2006, Billion re-entered politics and emerged as the Democratic nominee for Governor of South Dakota in 2006. He selected Rapid City historian Eric Abrahamson as his running mate, but was defeated in the general election by incumbent Republican governor Mike Rounds.

== Personal life ==
Billion married Linda Lambur in 1962, and they had five children. In 1980, he married his second wife, Deborah, and they had two children. He died at Avera McKennan Hospital in Sioux Falls, South Dakota, on February 25, 2023, at the age of 83. He is buried at Woodlawn Cemetery in Sioux Falls.

Party political offices
Preceded by Jim Abbott	Democratic nominee for Governor of South Dakota; 2006	Succeeded by Scott Heidepriem
