= Leonard E. Andera =

American politician from South Dakota

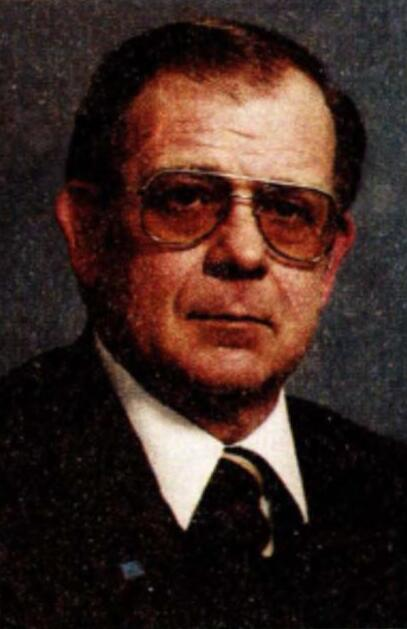

Member of the South Dakota Senate from the 20th district
- In office 1985–1990
- Preceded by: James L. Stoick
- Succeeded by: Eleanor Saukerson

Personal details
- Born: Leonard Edward Andera; May 17, 1934 near Stickney, South Dakota, U.S.
- Died: February 7, 2012 (aged 77) Sioux Falls, South Dakota, U.S.
- Party: Democratic
- Education: Wessington Springs College; University of South Dakota; University of South Dakota School of Law (JD)

Leonard Edward Andera (May 17, 1934 – February 7, 2012) was an American politician who served in the South Dakota Senate from 1985 to 1990.

Andera was raised on a farm near Stickney, South Dakota. He obtained a teaching certification from Wessington Springs Junior College upon graduation from high school. He served in the United States Army from 1953 to 1955, mainly as an instructor at Adjutant General School. After his discharge from the army, Andera attended the University of South Dakota, where he earned a bachelor's and a master's degree. He then taught at USD for six years, then returned to school, receiving a J. D. from the University of South Dakota School of Law in 1969. While pursuing his legal education, Andera served as a deputy sheriff for Clay County. He was later named South Dakota's commissioner of drug control, which he left for the securities commission. Andera married Kay Bess in 1968, and moved to Chamberlain in 1971, where he worked as a lawyer. Andera was a member of the South Dakota Senate between 1985 and 1990. Upon stepping down, he helped lead several state organizations.
