= Eleanor Saukerson =

American politician

Member of the South Dakota Senate from the 25th district
- In office 1993–1994
- Preceded by: James L. Stoick
- Succeeded by: Jim Hutmacher

Member of the South Dakota Senate from the 20th district
- In office 1991–1992
- Preceded by: Leonard E. Andera
- Succeeded by: Mel Olson

Personal details
- Born: March 30, 1922 Omaha, Nebraska, U.S.
- Died: October 22, 2005 (aged 83) Aberdeen, South Dakota, U.S.
- Party: Republican

Eleanor Geraldine Saukerson (née Beam; March 30, 1922 – October 22, 2005) was an American politician in South Dakota.

Born at Methodist Hospital in Omaha, Nebraska in 1922, she attended Benson High School. She moved to Chamberlain, South Dakota shortly after marrying Wilbur Saukerson in 1945. She served on the local school board and the South Dakota Housing Authority. From 1966 to 1991, she was the Brule County Register of Deeds. Between 1990 and 1994, Saukerson served on the South Dakota Senate. Her husband died in June 2001. Eleanor Saukerson moved to Aberdeen in 2003, and died there on October 22, 2005.
