= Gaylord Larsen =

American crime writer (born 1932)

Gaylord Larsen (born January 4, 1932) is an American crime writer.

He is well known for his fictional murder mystery Dorothy and Agatha, incorporating the well-known mystery novelists Dorothy L. Sayers and Agatha Christie as title characters, where Sayers must solve a crime when a man is murdered in her dining room.

Larsen was born in Canova, South Dakota, and educated at Sioux Falls College (B.A. 1953) and the University of California, Los Angeles (M.A. 1959). During the 1960s, he worked in the television and advertising industries in Los Angeles. In addition to his crime novels, Larsen is also a former writer for the Christian television anthology series This Is the Life. His literary influences include Raymond Chandler, Dorothy L. Sayers, and Ross Macdonald.

He is also the author of the Jason Bradley Mystery Series, as well as:

- 1981 The Kilbourne Connection
- 1983 Trouble Crossing the Pyrenees issued 1986 as An Educated Death
- 1987 One Hundred Eighty Degrees Murder
- 1988 A Paramount Kill set in Hollywood with Raymond Chandler as detective.
- 1989 Atascadro Island
- 1990 Dorothy and Agatha
