= Carole Hillard =

American politician

36th Lieutenant Governor of South Dakota
- In office January 7, 1995 – January 3, 2003
- Governor: Bill Janklow
- Preceded by: Steve T. Kirby
- Succeeded by: Dennis Daugaard

Member of the South Dakota House of Representatives

Personal details
- Born: Carole Kay Rypkema; August 14, 1936 Deadwood, South Dakota, U.S.
- Died: October 25, 2007 (aged 71) Lausanne, Switzerland
- Party: Republican
- Spouse: John Hillard
- Relations: Nicole Uhre-Balk (niece)
- Children: 5
- Education: University of Arizona; South Dakota State University; University of South Dakota

Carole Kay Hillard (née Rypkema; August 14, 1936 – October 25, 2007) was an American politician who was the first woman to serve as Lieutenant Governor of South Dakota.

== Personal ==
Hillard was born in Deadwood, South Dakota, August 14, 1936, to Edward Rypkema and Vernell Peterson; she was the oldest of three daughters born to them. She graduated from the University of Arizona in 1957 with an undergraduate degree in education. She subsequently earned a master's degree in education from South Dakota State University in 1982 and then a master's degree in political science at the University of South Dakota in 1984.

Hillard was married to John Hillard. They had five children.

== Politics ==
Hillard's electoral career began when she served on the Rapid City Common Council. She was then elected to two terms in the South Dakota House of Representatives from Rapid City.

Hillard, a Republican, was elected as lieutenant governor in 1994 and was re-elected in 1998 as the running mate of Bill Janklow; she served from 1995 to 2003. She was instrumental in the foundation of the Rapid City woman's shelter and the Cornerstone Rescue Mission and was inducted into the South Dakota Hall of Fame in 2007. In 1996, incumbent Democratic U.S. Congressman Tim Johnson of South Dakota's At-large congressional district decided to retire from the U.S. Senate. Hillard decided to run for the open seat, and lost to John Thune, 59%-41% in the Republican primary.

== Death ==
Hillard suffered a spinal fracture and three broken ribs on October 8, 2007, while sailing on a boat with friends in the Adriatic Sea. She underwent surgery in Zagreb, Croatia two days later. On October 19, 2007, she was hospitalized while in Switzerland before she was bound to return home to the United States. She had developed pneumonia, a bacterial blood infection and suffered a series of strokes. Hillard died at University Hospital in Lausanne on October 25, 2007, at age 71.

== See also ==
- List of female lieutenant governors in the United States

Party political offices
Preceded by Walter Dale Miller	Republican nominee for Lieutenant Governor of South Dakota; 1994, 1998	Succeeded by Dennis Daugaard
Political offices
Preceded by Steve T. Kirby	Lieutenant Governor of South Dakota; 1995–2003	Succeeded by Dennis Daugaard
