= Eric Abrahamson =

American historian

Eric John Abrahamson is an institutional historian and the 2006 Democratic candidate for the office of lieutenant governor in South Dakota. His running mate was Jack Billion.

== Professional and civic life ==
Abrahamson is the president of Vantage Point Historical Services, Inc. Vantage Point's clients include Fortune 500 companies in financial services, telecommunications, and banking as well as leading philanthropic organizations.

Abrahamson received a Ph.D. in American history from Johns Hopkins University in 2003. His dissertation and coursework focused on the role of government in promoting innovation and economic growth in the development of cellular telephony. Abrahamson has written a number of books and articles, including Spirited Commitment: The Samuel and Saidye Bronfman Foundation, which he co-authored with Roderick MacLeod (McGill-Queens University Press, 2010) and Anytime, Anywhere: Entrepreneurship and the Creation of a Wireless World, which he co-authored with Louis Galambos of Johns Hopkins University (Cambridge University Press, 2002). His book Building Home: Howard F. Ahmanson and the Politics of the American Dream was published by the University of California Press in February 2013. He edited a six-volume series of books on the history of the Rockefeller Foundation, including his book Beyond Charity: A Century of Philanthropic Innovation, which was released by the Rockefeller Foundation in March 2013.

In 2010, Abrahamson cofounded the Black Hills Knowledge Network, an innovative library-based community news and information project. He serves on the board of the John T. Vucurevich Foundation, as well as the South Dakota Humanities Council. He has also been a member of the Rapid City Area Schools Board of Education, chairman of the South Dakota State Library Board, a member of the board of the Black Hills Area Community Foundation and a member of the Rapid City Library Board of Trustees.

== Family ==
Eric is married to Lois Facer. They are the parents of two sons, Reed and Zachary.

== Publications ==
=== Books ===
- Anytime, anywhere : entrepreneurship and the creation of a wireless world by Louis Galambos; Eric John Abrahamson Cambridge, UK; New York : Cambridge University Press, 2002. ISBN 0-521-81616-5 held in 442 libraries
- Beyond Charity: A Century of Philanthropic Innovation by Eric John Abrahamson New York: Rockefeller Foundation, 2013. ISBN 9780979638923.
- Building Home: Howard F. Ahmanson and the Politics of the American Dream by Eric John Abrahamson Berkeley, CA: University of California Press, 2013. ISBN 9780520273757.
- Spirited Commitment: The Samuel and Saidye Bronfman Family Foundation by Roderick MacLeod and Eric John Abrahamson Montreal & Kingston: McGill-Queens University Press, 2010. ISBN 9780773537101.

Party political offices
Preceded by Mike Wilson	Democratic nominee for Lieutenant Governor of South Dakota; 2006	Succeeded by Ben Arndt
