= Steve T. Kirby =

American politician (born 1952)

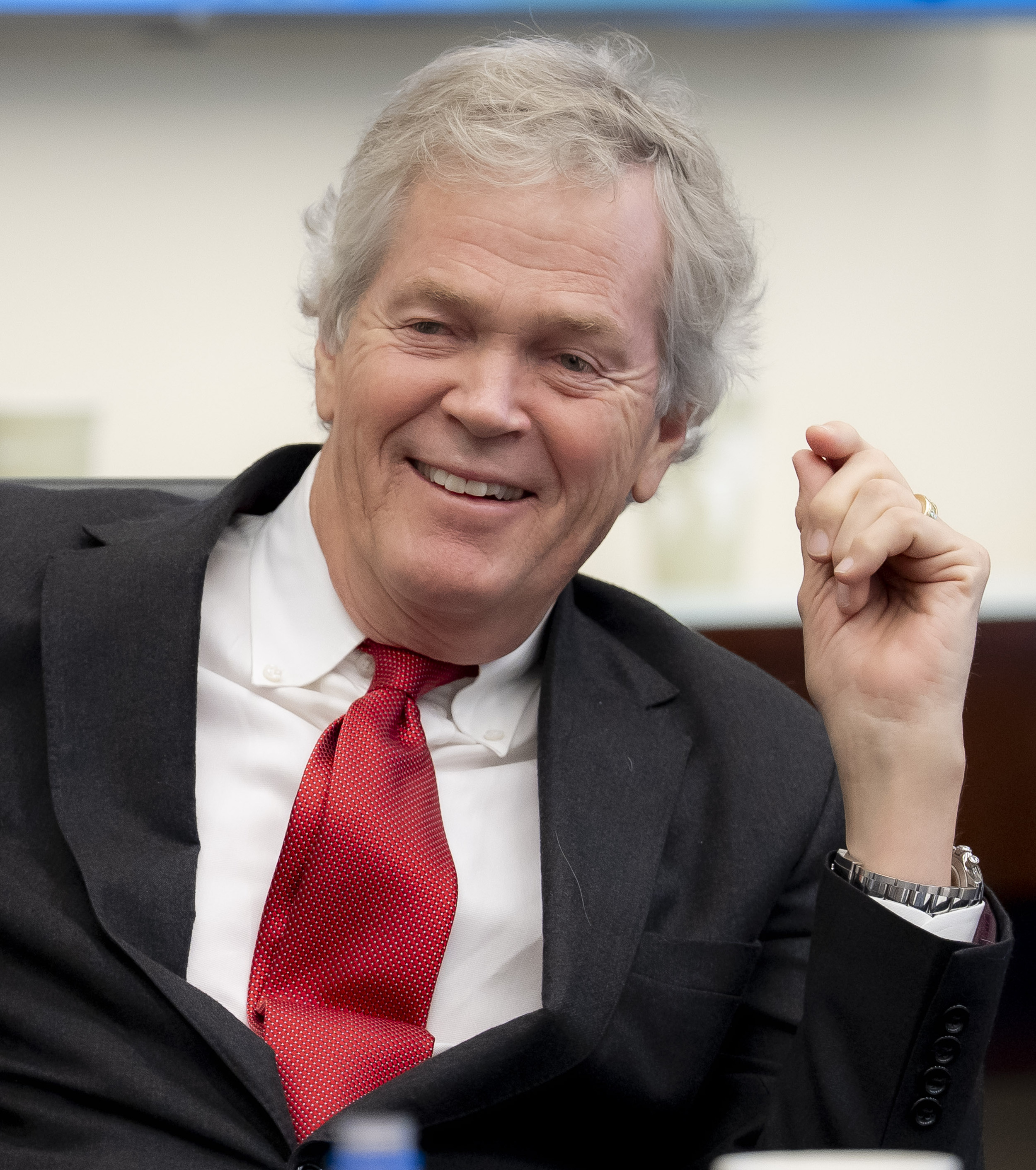
- Kirby in 2025

35th Lieutenant Governor of South Dakota
- In office April 19, 1993 – January 7, 1995
- Governor: Walter Miller
- Preceded by: Walter Miller
- Succeeded by: Carole Hillard

Personal details
- Born: Steven Thomas Kirby; March 26, 1952 (age 74) Sioux Falls, South Dakota, US
- Party: Republican
- Spouse: Suzette Kirby
- Education: Arizona State University (BS); University of South Dakota (JD)

Steven Thomas Kirby (born March 26, 1952) is an American politician. A Republican, he was the Lieutenant Governor of South Dakota from 1993 to 1995.

== Early life and education ==
Kirby graduated with a Bachelor of Science degree in political science from Arizona State University and a Juris Doctor from the University of South Dakota School of Law. He married Suzette Hustead and became the father of a son and two daughters.

== Career and politics ==
Kirby worked for Western Surety Company from 1977 until 1992, as corporate secretary and senior claim counsel. In 1992, he was a founding partner in South Dakota's largest venture capital firm, Bluestem Capital Company. He was the Lieutenant Governor of South Dakota from April 19, 1993, to January 7, 1995.

Kirby ran for the Republican nomination for Governor of South Dakota in 2002. The contest between Kirby and Barnett soon became negative and "dirty". Barnett attacked Kirby for not investing in companies based in South Dakota and for his involvement with Collagenesis, a company which removed skin from donated human cadavers and processed them for use. It became the subject of a massive scandal when it was revealed that the company was using the skins for much more lucrative cosmetic surgery like lip and penis enhancements while burn victims "lie waiting in hospitals as nurses scour the country for skin to cover their wounds, even though skin is in plentiful supply for plastic surgeons". However, the advertisements backfired because "the claims were so outlandish, that people thought for sure that they were exaggerated or completely fabricated".

Kirby considered running for the U.S. Senate in 2008 but chose not to. He has said that he considered running for the Senate in 2014 following incumbent Senator Tim Johnson's retirement.

Political offices
Preceded by Walter Miller	Lieutenant Governor of South Dakota; 1993–1995	Succeeded by Carole Hillard
