= Mike Kroger =

American politician

Member of the South Dakota House of Representatives from the 25th district
- In office 2003–2006

Personal details
- Born: April 24, 1951 (age 75) Salt Lake City, Utah
- Party: Democratic
- Profession: Businessman

Michael W. Kroger (born April 24, 1951) is an American former politician. He served in the South Dakota House of Representatives from 2003 to 2006.
