= Jim Lintz =

American politician

Member of the South Dakota Senate from the 30th district
- In office 2005–2008
- Preceded by: Drue Vitter
- Succeeded by: Gordon Howie

Member of the South Dakota House of Representatives from the 30th district
- In office 1999–2004

Personal details
- Born: November 14, 1949 (age 76) Rapid City, South Dakota
- Party: Republican
- Spouse: Brenda
- Children: two
- Profession: rancher, teacher

James A. Lintz (born November 14, 1949) is an American former politician. He served in the South Dakota House of Representatives from 1999 to 2004 and in the Senate from 2005 to 2008.
