= Drue Vitter =

American politician

Member of the South Dakota Senate from the 30th district
- In office 1997–2004
- Preceded by: James W. Emery
- Succeeded by: Jim Lintz

Personal details
- Born: July 21, 1942
- Died: October 8, 2004 (aged 62) Hill City, South Dakota, US
- Party: Republican
- Profession: rancher,

Drue J. Vitter (July 21, 1942 – October 8, 2004) was an American politician who served in the South Dakota Senate from 1997 until his death in 2004. He died at the age of 62 in at his home in Hill City, South Dakota.
