= South Dakota's 25th legislative district =

American legislative district

South Dakota's 25th State Senate district

South Dakota's 25th legislative district is one of 35 districts in the South Dakota Legislature. Each district is represented by 1 senator and 2 representatives. In the Senate, it has been represented by Republican Tom Pischke since 2017. In the House, it has been represented by Republicans Randy Gross and Jon Hansen since 2019.

== Geography ==
The district contains Minnehaha and Moody counties in eastern South Dakota, just north of Sioux Falls. Its largest city is Dell Rapids.
