= Jack Manke =

American politician

Member of the South Dakota Senate from the 30th district
- In office January 1985 – August 12, 1985
- Preceded by: district created
- Succeeded by: James W. Emery

Member of the South Dakota Senate from the 25th district
- In office January 1981 – December 1984
- Preceded by: Marshall J. Truax
- Succeeded by: James L. Stoick

Personal details
- Born: January 1917
- Died: August 12, 1985 (aged 68) near Hot Springs, South Dakota
- Party: Republican

John Donald Manke (January 1917 – August 12, 1985) was an American sheriff and politician.

Born in January 1917, Manke attended Edgemont High School for two years. He did not graduate, but eventually earned a certification equivalent to the high school diploma in 1975. From 1971 to 1979, Manke was the sheriff of Fall River County, South Dakota. He ran in the state legislative elections of 1980, and served in the South Dakota Senate between 1981 and 1985. Manke died of a heart attack on August 12, 1985, while traveling to Fall River Feedlot near Hot Springs, South Dakota. His funeral, held four days later, was attended by governor of South Dakota Bill Janklow. Manke's wife Margaret died in August 2003.
