= Dell Rapids, South Dakota =

- City
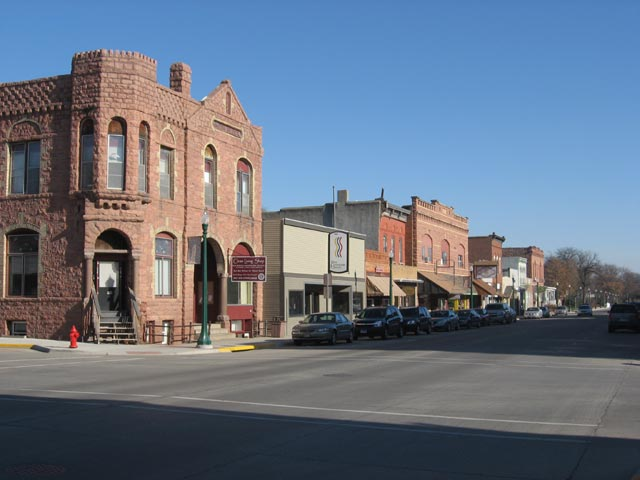
- Sioux Quartzite was used in the reconstruction of downtown Dell Rapids after a fire burned down the wooden buildings in the 1880s.

- Logo
- Nickname: "The Little City with the Big Attractions"
- Location in Minnehaha County and the state of South Dakota
- Coordinates: 43°49′28″N 96°42′52″W
- Country: United States
- State: South Dakota
- County: Minnehaha
- Founded: 1871
- Incorporated: 1888

Government
  - Mayor: Tom Earley

Area
  - Total: 2.32 sq mi (6.02 km^{2})
  - Land: 2.25 sq mi (5.84 km^{2})
  - Water: 0.069 sq mi (0.18 km^{2})
- Elevation: 1,539 ft (469 m)

Population (2020)
  - Total: 3,996
  - Density: 1,772.6/sq mi (684.39/km^{2})
- Time zone: UTC−6 (Central (CST))
  - Summer (DST): UTC−5 (CDT)
- ZIP code: 57022
- Area code: 605
- FIPS code: 46-15980
- GNIS feature ID: 1267351
- Website: City of Dell Rapids

Dell Rapids is a city in Minnehaha County, South Dakota, United States. The population was 3,996 at the 2020 census. It is known as "The Little City with the Big Attractions."

The city took its name from the Dells of the Wisconsin River, which were likened to the local rapids on the Big Sioux River.

== History ==
Dell Rapids was originally named Dell City, but was renamed after the rapids of the Big Sioux River. After a fire broke out on the main street and burned most of the town, it was rebuilt out of Sioux Quartzite, a common rock in the area. The Chicago, Milwaukee, and Saint Paul Railroad built a railroad into the area, reaching Dell Rapids from Egan in 1881. Two large Sioux Quartzite quarries owned by LG Everist are operated via this rail line, which is now operated by LG's subsidiary, the D&I Railroad. The community celebrates its heritage with the annual "Quarry Days" in July, and in June, the city hosts "Cootie Days", where rides and games are set up and available in the city's park.

== Geography ==
Dell Rapids is located along the Big Sioux River.

According to the United States Census Bureau, the city has an area of 2.09 square miles (5.41 km^{2}), of which 2.03 square miles (5.26 km^{2}) is land and 0.06 square miles (0.16 km^{2}) is water.

== Demographics ==
Historical population
Census	Pop.	Note	%±
1880	260		—
1890	993		281.9%
1900	1,255		26.4%
1910	1,367		8.9%
1920	1,677		22.7%
1930	1,657		−1.2%
1940	1,706		3.0%
1950	1,650		−3.3%
1960	1,863		12.9%
1970	1,991		6.9%
1980	2,389		20.0%
1990	2,484		4.0%
2000	2,980		20.0%
2010	3,633		21.9%
2020	3,996		10.0%
U.S. Decennial Census; 2020 census

=== 2020 census ===
As of the 2020 census, Dell Rapids had a population of 3,996 and a median age of 37.4 years. 27.8% of residents were under the age of 18 and 17.8% were 65 years of age or older. For every 100 females there were 102.4 males, and among adults there were 97.3 males for every 100 females age 18 and over.

0.0% of residents lived in urban areas, while 100.0% lived in rural areas.

There were 1,551 households in Dell Rapids, of which 35.8% had children under the age of 18 living in them. Of all households, 56.0% were married-couple households, 16.3% were households with a male householder and no spouse or partner present, and 22.2% were households with a female householder and no spouse or partner present. About 25.3% of all households were made up of individuals and 13.4% had someone living alone who was 65 years of age or older.

There were 1,606 housing units, of which 3.4% were vacant. The homeowner vacancy rate was 0.9% and the rental vacancy rate was 5.4%.

Racial composition as of the 2020 census
Race	Number	Percent
White	3,819	95.6%
Black or African American	5	0.1%
American Indian and Alaska Native	23	0.6%
Asian	12	0.3%
Native Hawaiian and Other Pacific Islander	0	0.0%
Some other race	21	0.5%
Two or more races	116	2.9%
Hispanic or Latino (of any race)	59	1.5%

=== 2010 census ===
At the 2010 census there were 3,633 people, 1,388 households, and 973 families living in the city. The population density was 1,789.7 inhabitants per square mile (691.0/km^{2}). There were 1,495 housing units at an average density of 736.5 per square mile (284.4/km^{2}). The racial makeup of the city was 98.0% White, 0.1% African American, 0.6% Native American, 0.2% Asian, 0.2% from other races, and 0.9% from two or more races. Hispanic or Latino of any race were 1.4%.

Of the 1,388 households 38.3% had children under the age of 18 living with them, 58.8% were married couples living together, 7.8% had a female householder with no husband present, 3.5% had a male householder with no wife present, and 29.9% were non-families. 25.1% of households were one person and 11.4% were one person aged 65 or older. The average household size was 2.58 and the average family size was 3.10.

The median age was 34.8 years. 28.9% of residents were under the age of 18; 6.6% were between the ages of 18 and 24; 27.6% were from 25 to 44; 21.7% were from 45 to 64; and 15% were 65 or older. The gender makeup of the city was 48.7% male and 51.3% female.

=== 2000 census ===
At the 2000 census, there were 2,980 people, 1,127 households, and 793 families living in the city. The population density was 1,519.9 inhabitants per square mile (586.8/km^{2}). There were 1,181 housing units at an average density of 602.3 per square mile (232.5/km^{2}). The racial makeup of the city was 98.69% White, 0.13% African American, 0.47% Native American, 0.20% Asian, 0.07% from other races, and 0.44% from two or more races. Hispanic or Latino of any race were 0.64% of the population.

Of the 1,127 households 36.7% had children under the age of 18 living with them, 60.5% were married couples living together, 7.2% had a female householder with no husband present, and 29.6% were non-families. 26.0% of households were one person and 13.5% were one person aged 65 or older. The average household size was 2.55 and the average family size was 3.09.

The age distribution was 28.4% under the age of 18, 6.5% from 18 to 24, 27.3% from 25 to 44, 19.4% from 45 to 64, and 18.3% 65 or older. The median age was 36 years. For every 100 females, there were 91.4 males. For every 100 females age 18 and over, there were 90.3 males.

As of 2000 the median income for a household in the city was $42,572, and the median family income was $49,536. Males had a median income of $31,867 versus $24,333 for females. The per capita income for the city was $17,731. About 1.9% of families and 4.0% of the population were below the poverty line, including 2.3% of those under age 18 and 12.7% of those age 65 or over.

== Education ==
Dell Rapids is home to two separate school systems: the Dell Rapids public school system and St. Mary's, a private Catholic parochial school.

The public school system includes Dell Rapids High School, a middle school, and an elementary school. The Public School District's mascot is the Quarriers, named after the large Sioux Quartzite rock quarries that are also in Dell Rapids. St. Mary's school also includes St. Mary High School, a junior high school, and elementary school. The St. Mary School District's mascot is the Cardinals.

== Notable people ==
- Daniel Ahlers, former member of the South Dakota House of Representatives
- John Anundson, former member of the South Dakota House of Representatives
- Dennis Daugaard, former governor of South Dakota
- Jon Hansen, member of the South Dakota House of Representatives
- William E. Merry, former member of the South Dakota House of Representatives
- John Mortvedt, soil scientist born and raised on a farm near Dell Rapids
- Marsha Symens, member of the South Dakota Senate

== Bibliography ==
- Thompson, Harry F. (2009). A New South Dakota History (Second ed.). Sioux Falls, SD: Center for Western Studies - Augustana College. ISBN 978-0-931170-00-3.
