= Ron J. Volesky =

American lawyer (born 1954)

Member of the South Dakota House of Representatives from the 21st district
- In office 1981–1986

Member of the South Dakota Senate from the 21st district
- In office 1993–2000

Member of the South Dakota Senate from the 21st district
- In office 2001–2002

Personal details
- Born: July 13, 1954 (age 72) Bullhead, South Dakota, U.S.
- Party: Democratic Party (1993-Present); Republican Party (1976-1993)
- Children: 3
- Education: Harvard University; South Dakota State University; University of South Dakota Law School

Ron J. Volesky (born July 13, 1954) is an American lawyer, who served 16 years in the South Dakota Senate, first as a member of the Republican Party before switching to the Democratic Party.

== Early life and education ==
Volesky was born in Bullhead, South Dakota on the Standing Rock Indian Reservation. Volesky graduated from Harvard University in 1976 with a degree in Government and International Relations and earned a master's degree from South Dakota State University and a Juris Doctor degree from the University of South Dakota.

== Personal life ==
Volesky lives in Huron, S.D. and is an enrolled member of the Standing Rock Tribe.

== Notable legal cases ==
Volesky represented an estimated 800 former workers in the significant class action case, Kirkvold v. Dakota Pork Industries, Inc., et al., when the Dakota Industries Plant in Huron, South Dakota shut down in 1997. The case involved bringing litigation against Dakota Pork Industries, Inc. due to failure of the company to comply with the federal requirements under the WARN Act. As a result, there were significant pleadings involved and briefing and discovery work and the matter was set for trial but prior to the same settled.

In the Matter of J.H., Abused or Neglected Child, Volesky represented a grandmother in her efforts to adopt her grandchild. Her grandchild was the victim of an abuse and neglect case in Lyman County and the parents' parental rights were eventually terminated. After termination, Volesky litigated to assist the grandmother in getting custody of the child and eventually being able to adopt the child. As a result, Judge Max Gors ruled in favor of the grandmother, but the case appealed to the Supreme Court and reversed on the basis that the Court did not have jurisdiction to place the child with the grandmother rather than the Department of Social Services. After further litigation and negotiations, the State dropped its efforts to block the adoption and eventually approved that adoption for the grandmother.

Volesky represents Debra Jenner-Tyler of Huron, who is serving a life sentence for the murder of her 3-year-old daughter Abby. In 1987, Jenner-Tyler stabbed her daughter roughly 70 times. Volesky speaks for Jenner-Tyler, as she routinely seeks parole from the Parole Board. Jenner-Tyler has repeatedly been denied parole.

== Political career and ambitions ==
Volesky has been an active member of both the Republican and Democratic parties in South Dakota. He has served in local and state government and made several attempts for higher state office.

Volesky served three years as city commissioner in Huron and 16 years in the State Senate.

In 2002, he ran for governor and finished second in a four-way Democratic primary to Jim Abbott.

Volesky again ran for governor of South Dakota in 2004 with his intention to be the Democratic candidate opposing Republican Mike Rounds. But he abandoned his bid on February 22, 2006, citing an inability to raise funds.

In August 2009, Volesky again announced his intention to run for governor of South Dakota. He was the fifth candidate to enter the race and the second Democratic candidate. According to year-end campaign finance reports, Volesky hadn't created or spent any money on or for his campaign.

Volesky also was the Democratic nominee for attorney general in 2002 and 2006.

Volesky ran for South Dakota Attorney General against Marty Jackley in the 2010 election.
