= Dennis Daugaard =

Governor of South Dakota from 2011 to 2019

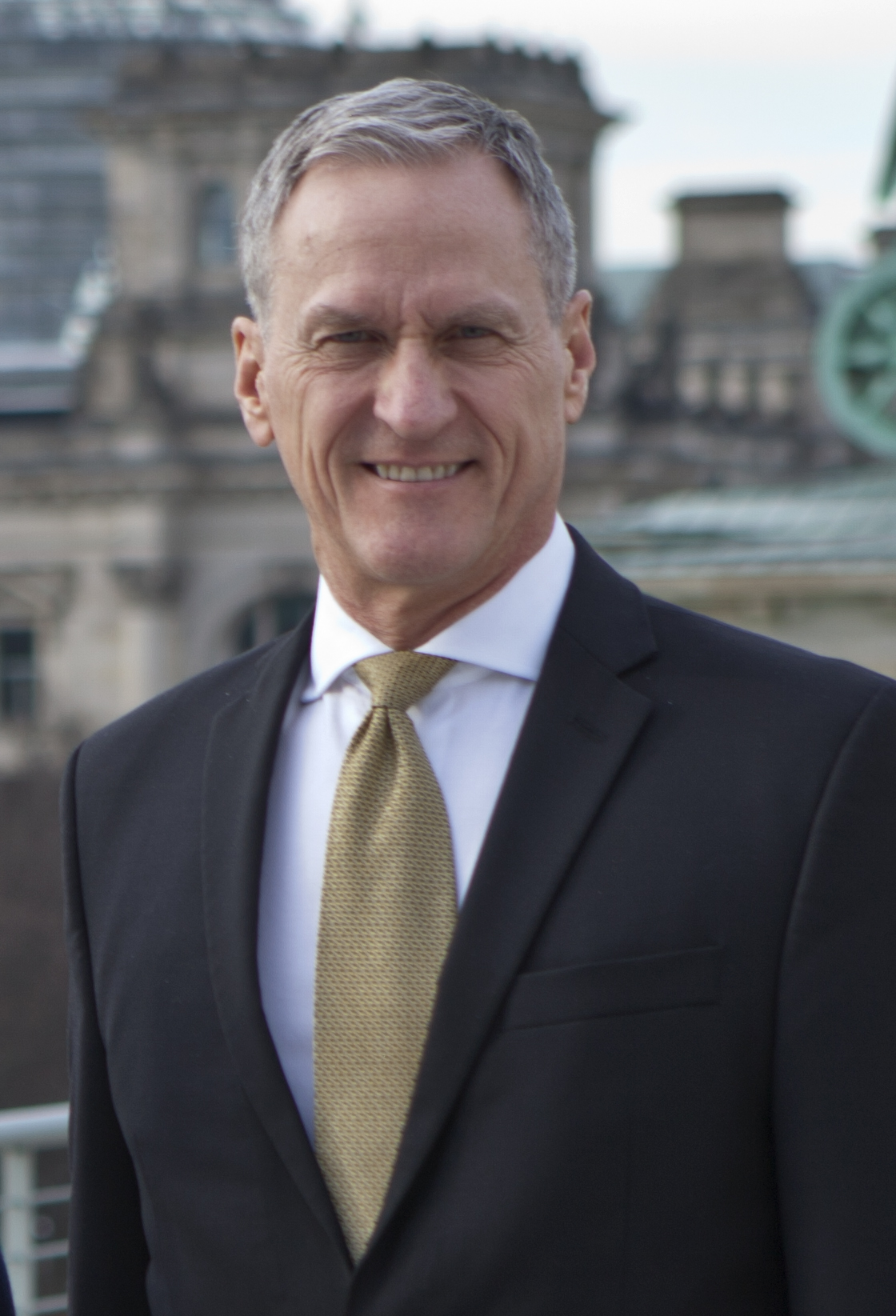
- Daugaard in 2017

32nd Governor of South Dakota
- In office January 8, 2011 – January 5, 2019
- Lieutenant: Matt Michels
- Preceded by: Mike Rounds
- Succeeded by: Kristi Noem

37th Lieutenant Governor of South Dakota
- In office January 7, 2003 – January 8, 2011
- Governor: Mike Rounds
- Preceded by: Carole Hillard
- Succeeded by: Matt Michels

Member of the South Dakota Senate from the 9th district
- In office January 7, 1997 – January 7, 2003
- Preceded by: Mark E. Rogen
- Succeeded by: Tom Dempster

Personal details
- Born: Dennis Martin Daugaard; June 11, 1953 (age 73) Garretson, South Dakota, U.S.
- Party: Republican
- Spouse: Linda Schmidt (m. 1981)
- Children: 3
- Relatives: Tony Venhuizen (son-in-law)
- Education: University of South Dakota (BS); Northwestern University (JD)

Dennis Martin Daugaard (born June 11, 1953) is an American attorney and politician who served as the 32nd governor of South Dakota from 2011 to 2019. A member of the Republican Party, he was the first chief executive of a U.S. state to be the child of deaf parents. Before being elected governor, he was a lawyer, banker, development director for a nonprofit organization; he also served as a state senator from 1997 to 2003 and the 37th lieutenant governor of South Dakota from 2003 to 2011.

== Background, education and family ==
Dennis Martin Daugaard was born in 1953 and raised on a family farm near Garretson, South Dakota, the son of Florence Margaret (Kennedy) and Raymond Victor Daugaard. Both of his parents were deaf. His paternal grandparents were immigrants from Denmark. While Dennis Daugaard was growing up, his family's primary language at home was American Sign Language. Daugaard went to a local one-room country school as a child. For high school, he moved to the City of Dell Rapids, where he played the French horn. He graduated in 1971.

Daugaard attended the University of South Dakota in Vermillion where he was advised by William O. Farber. He graduated from USD in 1975 with a Bachelor of Science in government and from Northwestern University School of Law in 1978. Daugaard worked to pay his way through law school as an ASL interpreter, a bus driver, a law clerk and a security guard.

== Early career ==
Daugaard worked as an attorney in Chicago from 1978 to 1981 before returning to South Dakota. He married Linda Schmidt that year and they have three children: Laura, who is married to Jay Mitchell; Sara, who is married to Tony Venhuizen; and Christopher, who is married to Emily Conway.

Daugaard worked as an executive banker in Sioux Falls, South Dakota, from 1981 to 1990. He then worked for the Children's Home Society of South Dakota, as Development Director from 1990 to 2002 and Executive Director from 2002 to 2009.

Daugaard's first entry into electoral politics came in 1996, when he was elected to the South Dakota State Senate as a Republican. He remained a state senator until he was elected the 37th lieutenant governor of South Dakota in 2002 as the running mate of Governor Mike Rounds, a position he held for eight years.

== Service as state senator ==
While serving in the state legislature, Daugaard said his priorities were helping children and the disabled, as well as reducing crime.

== South Dakota lieutenant governor ==
Daugaard was elected Lieutenant Governor in 2002 and reelected in 2006. As a lieutenant governor, he served as the president of the South Dakota Senate. In addition, he served as the chair of the Workers' Compensation Advisory Council, which reviews and makes recommendations regarding South Dakota's worker compensation program. While lieutenant governor, Daugaard also fulfilled other duties assigned by the governor and delegated by the state constitution. He served as a member of a commission that dealt with state constitutional amendments and was chairman of a task force that considered options to reduce the number of South Dakotans lacking health insurance.

In 2009, Daugaard promoted legislation to establish the South Dakota Ellsworth Development Authority to promote and manage economic development in Rapid City and other areas surrounding Ellsworth Air Force Base in western South Dakota. He has also promoted the Honor Flight program, which honors World War II veterans.

== 2010 and 2014 gubernatorial campaigns ==
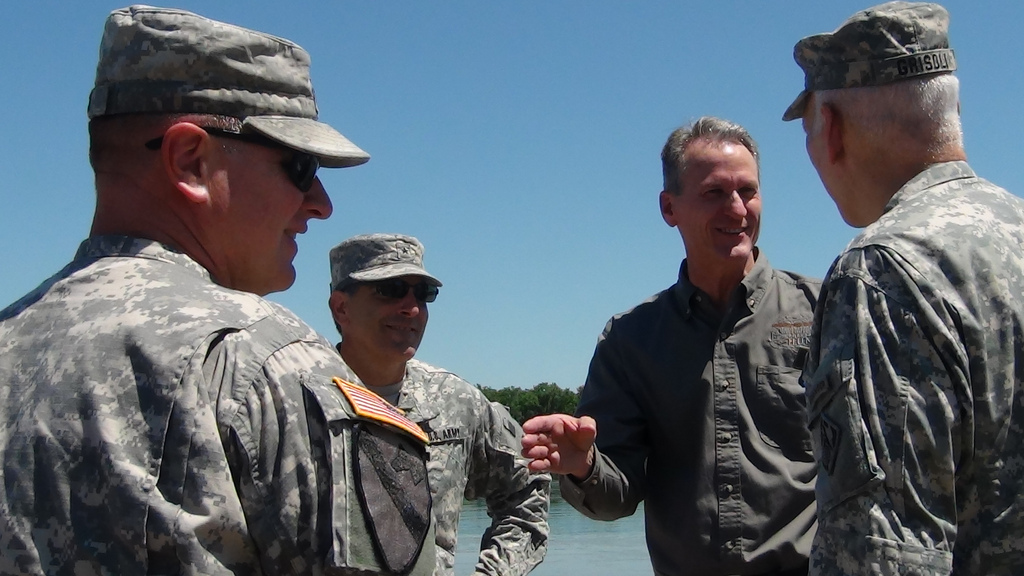
Governor Dennis Daugaard is briefed on flood preparations

In 2010 Daugaard ran for the Republican nomination for governor. He won the primary election against several other candidates. Daugaard chose Matt Michels as his running mate. His campaign was led by his son-in-law Tony Venhuizen.

The Daugaard/Michels ticket beat Democratic nominees Scott Heidepriem and Ben Arndt by 61.5% to 38.5% in the November general election. Daugaard was the first child of deaf adults to be elected governor of any state. During his campaign, he stressed that he has often promoted issues affecting the deaf and hard of hearing, and is sympathetic to their children, most of whom are hearing, as he is.

Daugaard and Michels were reelected in 2014.

== Daugaard administrations ==
In 2011, Daugaard established the first Office of Tribal Relations in his cabinet, appointing J.R. LaPlante (Cheyenne River Sioux) as its secretary. No other state government has such an office. LaPlante had a law practice in Vermillion, and had served as the "chief judge and court administrator for the Crow Creek Sioux Tribe in Fort Thompson. In addition, he had served as an administrative officer for the Cheyenne River Sioux Tribe." He worked with Daugaard to build government-to-government working relationships on issues such as "housing, economic development, public safety, and human services." He used mediation to resolve conflicts, for instance reaching agreement among state, county and tribal officials in Charles Mix County to recognize the Yankton Sioux's historical presence in highway signage. In 2011, Daugaard appointed Dusty Johnson as his chief of staff. In 2014, he appointed his son-in-law and former campaign director Tony Venhuizen as his chief of staff.

According to a Morning Consult poll conducted from May through September 2016, Daugaard was the most popular governor of any U.S. state, with a 74% statewide approval rating. In rankings published in July 2018, he was 5th most popular, with an approval rating of 61%.

On October 23, 2018, Daugaard endorsed Kristi Noem for governor in the imminent election.

== Electoral history ==
South Dakota State Senate 9th District Election, 1996
Party	Candidate	Votes	%
Republican	Dennis Daugaard	5,419	59.13
Democratic	Mark Rogen (inc.)	3,746	40.87

South Dakota State Senate 9th District Election, 1998
Party	Candidate	Votes	%
Republican	Dennis Daugaard (inc.)	4,581	62.38
Democratic	Mark Anderson	2,763	37.62

South Dakota State Senate 9th District Election, 2000
Party	Candidate	Votes	%
Republican	Dennis Daugaard (inc.)	6,218	66.65
Democratic	Donald Beaner	3,111	33.35

South Dakota Governor Republican Primary Election, 2010
Party	Candidate	Votes	%
Republican	Dennis Daugaard	42,261	50.42
Republican	Scott Munsterman	14,726	17.57
Republican	Dave Knudson	13,218	15.77
Republican	Gordon Howie	10,426	12.44
Republican	Ken Knuppe	3,186	3.80

South Dakota Governor Election, 2010
Party	Candidate	Votes	%
Republican	Dennis Daugaard	195,046	61.51
Democratic	Scott Heidepriem	122,037	38.49

South Dakota Governor Republican Primary Election, 2014
Party	Candidate	Votes	%
Republican	Dennis Daugaard (inc.)	60,017	80.87
Republican	Lora Hubbel	14,196	19.13

South Dakota Governor Election, 2014
Party	Candidate	Votes	%
Republican	Dennis Daugaard (inc.)	195,477	70.47
Democratic	Susan Wismer	70,549	25.43
Independent	Michael Myers	11,377	4.10

Party political offices
Preceded by Carole Hillard	Republican nominee for Lieutenant Governor of South Dakota; 2002, 2006	Succeeded by Matt Michels
Preceded by Mike Rounds	Republican nominee for Governor of South Dakota; 2010, 2014	Succeeded by Kristi Noem
Political offices
Preceded by Carole Hillard	Lieutenant Governor of South Dakota; 2003–2011	Succeeded by Matt Michels
Preceded by Mike Rounds	Governor of South Dakota; 2011–2019	Succeeded by Kristi Noem
U.S. order of precedence (ceremonial)
Preceded by Martha McSally as Former U.S. Senator	Order of precedence of the United States; Within South Dakota	Succeeded by Jack Markell as Former Governor
Preceded by Jack Dalrymple as Former Governor	Order of precedence of the United States; Outside South Dakota	Succeeded by Mark Racicot as Former Governor
