= 1978 Iowa Senate election =

- November 7, 1978

25 out of 50 seats in the Iowa State Senate 26 seats needed for a majority
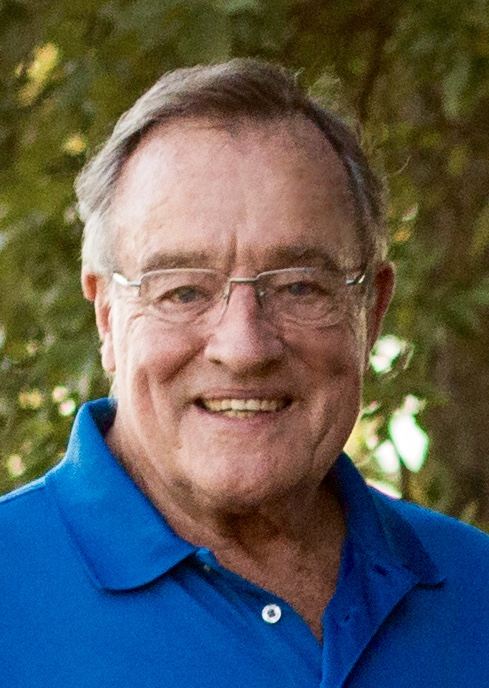
	Majority party	Minority party
Leader	Calvin Hultman	George Kinley
Party	Republican	Democratic
Leader's seat	49th	34th
Last election	24	26
Seats before	24	26
Seats after	28	22
Seat change	▲4	▼4
Majority Leader before election
George Kinley
Democratic
Elected Majority Leader
Calvin Hultman
Republican

The 1978 Iowa State Senate elections took place as part of the biennial 1978 United States elections. Iowa voters elected state senators in half of the state senate's districts—the 25 odd-numbered state senate districts. State senators serve four-year terms in the Iowa State Senate, with half of the seats up for election each cycle. A statewide map of the 50 state Senate districts in the year 1978 is provided by the Iowa General Assembly here.

The primary election on June 6, 1978, determined which candidates appeared on the November 7, 1978 general election ballot. Primary election results can be obtained here. General election results can be obtained here.

Following the previous election in 1976, Democrats had control of the Iowa state Senate with 26 seats to Republicans' 24 seats.

To take control of the chamber from Democrats, the Republicans needed to net 2 Senate seats.

Republicans flipped control of the Iowa State Senate following the 1978 general election, with Republicans claiming 28 seats and Democrats falling to 22 seats after the election (a net gain of 4 seats for the Republicans).

== Summary of Results ==
- NOTE: The 25 even-numbered districts did not have elections in 1978 so they are not listed here.

State Senate District	Incumbent	Party	Elected Senator	Party
1st	Lucas DeKoster	Rep	Lucas DeKoster	Republican
3rd	Warren E. Curtis	Rep	Arne F. Waldstein	Republican
5th	Ray Taylor	Rep	Ray Taylor	Republican
7th	Milo Merritt	Dem	Arthur Gratias	Republican
9th	Dale L. Tieden	Rep	Dale L. Tieden	Republican
11th	Stephen W. Bisenius	Rep	Stephen W. Bisenius	Republican
13th	James M. Redmond	Dem	Arthur R. Kudart	Republican
15th	Robert "Bob" Rush	Dem	Robert "Bob" Rush	Democratic
17th	Fred Nolting	Dem	Richard L. Comito	Republican
19th	Clifford Earl Burroughs	Rep	John W. Jensen	Republican
21st	John S. Murray	Rep	John S. Murray	Republican
23rd	C. Joseph Coleman	Dem	C. Joseph Coleman	Democratic
25th	E. Kevin Kelly	Rep	Clarence S. Carney	Republican
27th	Louis P. Culver	Dem	Jack W. Hester	Republican
29th	Norman Rodgers	Dem	Norman Rodgers	Democratic
31st	Earl Willits	Dem	Earl Willits	Democratic
33rd	Philip B. Hill	Rep	Julia Gentleman	Republican
35th	Eugene Marshall Hill	Dem	Joe Brown	Democratic
37th	Minnette Doderer	Dem	Arthur A. Small	Democratic
39th	Roger John Shaff	Rep	Norman J. Goodwin	Republican
41st	Forrest F. Ashcraft	Rep	Patrick J. Deluhery	Democratic
43rd	Lowell Junkins	Dem	Lowell Junkins	Democratic
45th	Gene W. Glenn	Dem	Sue Yenger	Republican
47th	Richard Ramsey	Rep	Richard Ramsey	Republican
49th	Calvin Hultman	Rep	Calvin Hultman	Republican

== Detailed Results ==
- Reminder: Only odd-numbered Iowa Senate seats were up for election in 1978; therefore, even-numbered seats did not have elections in 1978 & are not shown.
- Note: If a district does not list a primary, then that district did not have a competitive primary (i.e., there may have only been one candidate file for that district).

=== District 1 ===
Iowa Senate, District 1 Republican Primary Election, 1978
Party	Candidate	Votes	%
Republican	Lucas DeKoster (incumbent)	4,330	50.4
Republican	Henry T. Hoefakker	4,268	49.6
Total votes		8,598	100.0

Iowa Senate, District 1 General Election, 1978
Party	Candidate	Votes	%
Republican	Lucas DeKoster (incumbent)	9,038	63.0
Independent	Henry T. Hoefakker	5,307	37.0
Total votes		14,345	100.0
Republican hold			

=== District 3 ===
Iowa Senate, District 3 Republican Primary Election, 1978
Party	Candidate	Votes	%
Republican	Arne Waldstein	2,152	63.5
Republican	Dick Angove	1,239	36.5
Total votes		3,391	100.0

Iowa Senate, District 3 General Election, 1978
Party	Candidate	Votes	%
Republican	Arne Waldstein	8,597	53.6
Democratic	Keith Baker	7,451	46.4
Total votes		16,048	100.0
Republican hold			

=== District 5 ===
Iowa Senate, District 5 General Election, 1978
Party	Candidate	Votes	%
Republican	Ray Taylor (incumbent)	8,838	60.0
Democratic	Daryl Frey	5,889	40.0
Total votes		14,727	100.0
Republican hold			

=== District 7 ===
Iowa Senate, District 7 General Election, 1978
Party	Candidate	Votes	%
Republican	Arthur Gratias	9,838	54.9
Democratic	Milo Merritt (incumbent)	8,080	45.1
Total votes		17,918	100.0
Republican gain from Democratic			

=== District 9 ===
Iowa Senate, District 9 General Election, 1978
Party	Candidate	Votes	%
Republican	Dale L. Tieden (incumbent)	10,702	100.0
Total votes		10,702	100.0
Republican hold			

=== District 11 ===
Iowa Senate, District 11 General Election, 1978
Party	Candidate	Votes	%
Republican	Stephen W. Bisenius (incumbent)	9,146	54.3
Democratic	Maurice Hennessey	7,684	45.7
Total votes		16,830	100.0
Republican hold			

=== District 13 ===
Iowa Senate, District 13 Democratic Primary Election, 1978
Party	Candidate	Votes	%
Democratic	James M. Redmond (incumbent)	1,447	51.8
Democratic	Walter L. McNamara	1,345	48.2
Total votes		2,792	100.0

Iowa Senate, District 13 General Election, 1978
Party	Candidate	Votes	%
Republican	Arthur R. Kudart	9,433	57.6
Democratic	Nick Berry	6,953	42.4
Total votes		16,386	100.0
Republican gain from Democratic			

=== District 15 ===
Iowa Senate, District 15 General Election, 1978
Party	Candidate	Votes	%
Democratic	Bob Rush (incumbent)	8,847	54.6
Republican	Lloyd E. Humphreys	7,354	45.4
Total votes		16,201	100.0
Democratic hold			

=== District 17 ===
Iowa Senate, District 17 General Election, 1978
Party	Candidate	Votes	%
Republican	Richard Comito	8,691	51.5
Democratic	Fred Nolting (incumbent)	8,184	48.5
Total votes		16,875	100.0
Republican gain from Democratic			

=== District 19 ===
Iowa Senate, District 19 Republican Primary Election, 1978
Party	Candidate	Votes	%
Republican	John W. Jensen	2,672	60.3
Republican	Cliff Burroughs (incumbent)	1,761	39.7
Total votes		4,433	100.0

Iowa Senate, District 19 General Election, 1978
Party	Candidate	Votes	%
Republican	John W. Jensen	9,564	61.8
Democratic	Jerald Fuerstenberg	5,900	38.2
Total votes		15,464	100.0
Republican hold			

=== District 21 ===
Iowa Senate, District 21 General Election, 1978
Party	Candidate	Votes	%
Republican	John S. Murray (incumbent)	11,906	62.7
Democratic	Larry N. Larson	7,083	37.3
Total votes		18,989	100.0
Republican hold			

=== District 23 ===
Iowa Senate, District 23 General Election, 1978
Party	Candidate	Votes	%
Democratic	C. Joseph Coleman (incumbent)	10,388	100.0
Total votes		10,388	100.0
Democratic hold			

=== District 25 ===
Iowa Senate, District 25 General Election, 1978
Party	Candidate	Votes	%
Republican	Clarence Carney	8,247	55.1
Democratic	Fred T. Kelly	6,724	44.9
Total votes		14,971	100.0
Republican hold			

=== District 27 ===
Iowa Senate, District 27 Democratic Primary Election, 1978
Party	Candidate	Votes	%
Democratic	Louis P. Culver (incumbent)	1,436	51.0
Democratic	John R. Meyer	1,379	49.0
Total votes		2,815	100.0

Iowa Senate, District 27 General Election, 1978
Party	Candidate	Votes	%
Republican	Jack W. Hester	8,555	57.3
Democratic	Wade Burchett	6,364	42.7
Total votes		14,919	100.0
Republican gain from Democratic			

=== District 29 ===
Iowa Senate, District 29 Democratic Primary Election, 1978
Party	Candidate	Votes	%
Democratic	Norman Rodgers (incumbent)	1,682	55.1
Democratic	Barry Piatt	1,369	44.9
Total votes		3,051	100.0

Iowa Senate, District 29 General Election, 1978
Party	Candidate	Votes	%
Democratic	Norman Rodgers (incumbent)	10,641	55.2
Republican	Roy W. Meadows	8,649	44.8
Total votes		19,290	100.0
Democratic hold			

=== District 31 ===
Iowa Senate, District 31 General Election, 1978
Party	Candidate	Votes	%
Democratic	Earl Willits (incumbent)	8,349	63.2
Republican	Donald Kerr	4,859	36.8
Total votes		13,208	100.0
Democratic hold			

=== District 33 ===
Iowa Senate, District 33 General Election, 1978
Party	Candidate	Votes	%
Republican	Julia Gentleman	12,736	61.4
Democratic	John Dengler	7,078	34.1
Independent	Michael Feld	928	4.5
Total votes		20,742	100.0
Republican hold			

=== District 35 ===
Iowa Senate, District 35 Democratic Primary Election, 1978
Party	Candidate	Votes	%
Democratic	Joe Brown	1,285	44.8
Democratic	Eugene M. Hill (incumbent)	1,088	37.9
Democratic	Arnold Brouwer	495	17.3
Total votes		2,868	100.0

Iowa Senate, District 35 General Election, 1978
Party	Candidate	Votes	%
Democratic	Joe Brown	10,063	56.0
Republican	Bart Basche	7,911	44.0
Total votes		17,974	100.0
Democratic hold			

=== District 37 ===
Iowa Senate, District 37 Republican Primary Election, 1978
Party	Candidate	Votes	%
Republican	Victor V. Woolums II	818	55.3
Republican	Bob Baker	662	44.7
Total votes		1,480	100.0

Iowa Senate, District 37 Democratic Primary Election, 1978
Party	Candidate	Votes	%
Democratic	Arthur A. Small	2,502	55.6
Democratic	William J. Hargrave, Jr.	1,994	44.4
Total votes		4,496	100.0

Iowa Senate, District 37 General Election, 1978
Party	Candidate	Votes	%
Democratic	Arthur A. Small	10,781	63.6
Republican	Victor V. Woolums II	5,817	34.3
Socialist	David Manuel	357	2.1
Total votes		16,955	100.0
Democratic hold			

=== District 39 ===
Iowa Senate, District 39 General Election, 1978
Party	Candidate	Votes	%
Republican	Norman J. Goodwin	9,522	59.4
Democratic	Paul R. Willis, Jr.	6,515	40.6
Total votes		16,037	100.0
Republican hold			

=== District 41 ===
Iowa Senate, District 41 Democratic Primary Election, 1978
Party	Candidate	Votes	%
Democratic	Patrick J. Deluhery	1,174	72.2
Democratic	Mike Manno	453	27.8
Total votes		1,627	100.0

Iowa Senate, District 41 General Election, 1978
Party	Candidate	Votes	%
Democratic	Patrick J. Deluhery	6,368	57.0
Republican	Forrest F. Ashcraft (incumbent)	4,808	43.0
Total votes		11,176	100.0
Democratic gain from Republican			

=== District 43 ===
Iowa Senate, District 43 General Election, 1978
Party	Candidate	Votes	%
Democratic	Lowell Junkins (incumbent)	8,757	63.5
Republican	Gordon C. McMillan	5,033	36.5
Total votes		13,790	100.0
Democratic hold			

=== District 45 ===
Iowa Senate, District 45 General Election, 1978
Party	Candidate	Votes	%
Republican	Sue Yenger	8,387	51.6
Democratic	Gene W. Glenn (incumbent)	7,860	48.4
Total votes		16,247	100.0
Republican gain from Democratic			

=== District 47 ===
Iowa Senate, District 47 General Election, 1978
Party	Candidate	Votes	%
Republican	Dick Ramsey (incumbent)	11,178	60.3
Democratic	Rollin C. Bridge	7,369	39.7
Total votes		18,547	100.0
Republican hold			

=== District 49 ===
Iowa Senate, District 49 General Election, 1978
Party	Candidate	Votes	%
Republican	Calvin Hultman (incumbent)	9,983	66.2
Democratic	David Childs	5,087	33.8
Total votes		15,070	100.0
Republican hold			

== See also ==
- United States elections, 1978
- United States House of Representatives elections in Iowa, 1978
- Elections in Iowa
