= 1974 Iowa Senate election =

- November 5, 1974

26 out of 50 seats in the Iowa State Senate 26 seats needed for a majority
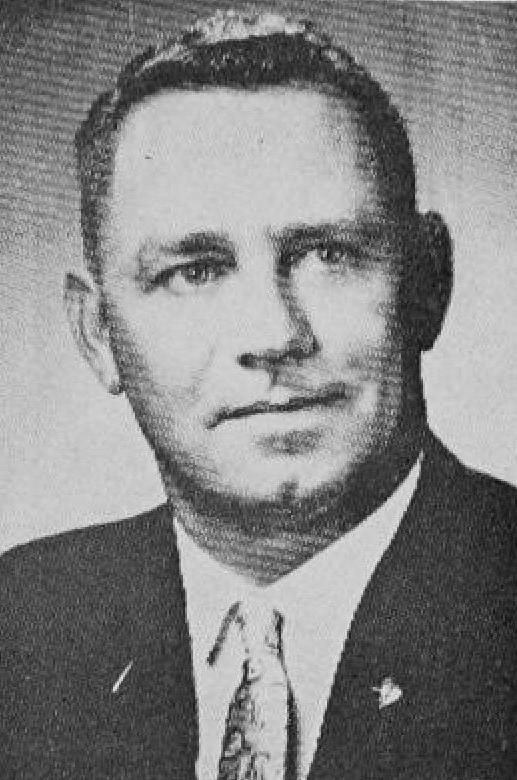

	Majority party	Minority party
Leader	James Schaben	Clifton C. Lamborn
Party	Democratic	Republican
Leader's seat	27th	12th
Last election	22	28
Seats before	22	28
Seats after	26	24
Seat change	▲4	▼4
Majority Leader before election
Clifton C. Lamborn
Republican
Elected Majority Leader
George Kinley
Democratic

The 1974 Iowa State Senate elections took place as part of the biennial 1974 United States elections. Iowa voters elected state senators in 26 of the state senate's districts—the 25 odd-numbered state senate districts and a special election in district 10. State senators serve four-year terms in the Iowa State Senate, with half of the seats up for regularly scheduled election each cycle. A statewide map of the 50 state Senate districts in 1974 is provided by the Iowa General Assembly here.

The primary election on June 4, 1974, determined which candidates appeared on the November 5, 1974 general election ballot. Primary election results can be obtained here. General election results can be obtained here.

Following the previous election in 1972, Republicans had control of the Iowa state Senate with 28 seats to Democrats' 22 seats.

To take control of the chamber from Republicans, the Democrats needed to net 4 Senate seats.

Democrats flipped control of the Iowa State Senate following the 1974 general election, with Democrats claiming 26 seats and Republicans falling to 24 seats after the election (a net gain of four seats for the Democrats).

== Summary of results ==
- NOTE: 24 of the even-numbered districts did not have elections in 1974, so they are not listed here (district 10 had a special election).

State senate district	Incumbent	Party	Elected senator	Party
1st	Lucas DeKoster	Rep	Lucas DeKoster	Republican
3rd	Warren E. Curtis	Rep	Warren E. Curtis	Republican
5th	Ray Taylor	Rep	Ray Taylor	Republican
7th	Ralph Farnham McCartney	Rep	Milo Merritt	Democratic
9th	Dale L. Tieden	Rep	Dale L. Tieden	Republican
10th (Note: Special election.)	Mike Blouin	Dem	Robert M. "Bob" Carr	Democratic
11th	Gene Kennedy	Dem	Richard John Norpel	Democratic
13th	Tom Riley	Rep	James M. Redmond	Democratic
15th	Ralph Wilson Potter	Rep	Steve Sovern	Democratic
17th	Barton L. Schwieger	Rep	Fred Nolting	Democratic
19th	Clifford Earl Burroughs	Rep	Clifford Earl Burroughs	Republican
21st	John S. Murray	Rep	John S. Murray	Republican
23rd	C. Joseph Coleman	Dem	C. Joseph Coleman	Democratic
25th	E. Kevin Kelly	Rep	E. Kevin Kelly	Republican
27th	James Schaben	Dem	Louis P. Culver	Democratic
29th	Norman Rodgers	Dem	Norman Rodgers	Democratic
31st	Earl Willits	Dem	Earl Willits	Democratic
33rd	George F. Milligan	Rep	Philip B. Hill	Republican
35th	Eugene Marshall Hill	Dem	Eugene Marshall Hill	Democratic
37th	Minnette Doderer	Dem	Minnette Doderer	Democratic
39th	Roger John Shaff	Rep	Roger John Shaff	Republican
41st	Bill Gluba	Dem	Bill Gluba	Democratic
43rd	Lowell Junkins	Dem	Lowell Junkins	Democratic
45th	Gene W. Glenn	Dem	Gene W. Glenn	Democratic
47th	Richard Ramsey	Rep	Richard Ramsey	Republican
49th	Calvin Hultman	Rep	Calvin Hultman	Republican

== Detailed results ==
- Reminder: All odd-numbered Iowa Senate seats were up for regularly scheduled election in 1974, as well as a special election in the 10th district. All other even-numbered districts did not have elections in 1974.
- Note: If a district does not list a primary, then that district did not have a competitive primary (i.e., there may have only been one candidate file for that district).

=== District 1 ===
Iowa Senate, District 1 Republican primary election, 1974
Party	Candidate	Votes	%
Republican	Lucas DeKoster (incumbent)	3,272	51.4
Republican	Harold E. Vermeer	3,095	48.6
Total votes		6,367	100.0

Iowa Senate, District 1 general election, 1974
Party	Candidate	Votes	%
Republican	Lucas DeKoster (incumbent)	12,800	67.4
Democratic	Harry Gerrit Kobes	6,196	32.6
Total votes		18,996	100.0
Republican hold			

=== District 3 ===
Iowa Senate, District 3 general election, 1974
Party	Candidate	Votes	%
Republican	Warren E. Curtis (incumbent)	9,540	50.7
Democratic	Jack Clark	9,277	49.3
Total votes		18,817	100.0
Republican hold			

=== District 5 ===
Iowa Senate, District 5 general election, 1974
Party	Candidate	Votes	%
Republican	Ray Taylor (incumbent)	9,060	52.3
Democratic	Henry J. Stoffer	8,272	47.7
Total votes		17,332	100.0
Republican hold			

=== District 7 ===
Iowa Senate, District 7 general election, 1974
Party	Candidate	Votes	%
Democratic	Milo Merritt	10,038	53.6
Republican	Orlo G. Natvig	8,705	46.4
Total votes		18,743	100.0
Democratic gain from Republican			

=== District 9 ===
Iowa Senate, District 9 Democratic primary election, 1974
Party	Candidate	Votes	%
Democratic	Mathew Karpan	1,165	52.5
Democratic	James L. Eno	1,055	47.5
Total votes		2,220	100.0

Iowa Senate, District 9 general election, 1974
Party	Candidate	Votes	%
Republican	Dale L. Tieden (incumbent)	10,884	63.6
Democratic	Mathew Karpan	6,240	36.4
Total votes		17,124	100.0
Republican hold			

=== District 10 ===
Iowa Senate, District 10 special election, November 5, 1974
Party	Candidate	Votes	%
Democratic	Robert M. Carr	6,273	59.5
Republican	James L. Esmoil	4,270	40.5
Total votes		10,543	100.0
Democratic hold			

=== District 11 ===
Iowa Senate, District 11 general election, 1974
Party	Candidate	Votes	%
Democratic	Richard J. Norpel, Sr.	8,790	54.7
Republican	Stephen W. Bisenius	7,276	45.3
Total votes		16,066	100.0
Democratic hold			

=== District 13 ===
Iowa Senate, District 13 Republican primary election, 1974
Party	Candidate	Votes	%
Republican	Ivor W. Stanley	1,376	59.3
Republican	Norris C. Dobbin	944	40.7
Total votes		2,320	100.0

Iowa Senate, District 13 general election, 1974
Party	Candidate	Votes	%
Democratic	James Michael Redmond	10,441	57.2
Republican	Ivor W. Stanley	7,820	42.8
Total votes		18,261	100.0
Democratic gain from Republican			

=== District 15 ===
Iowa Senate, District 15 general election, 1974
Party	Candidate	Votes	%
Democratic	Steve Sovern	9,931	56.9
Republican	Ralph W. Potter (incumbent)	7,518	43.1
Total votes		17,449	100.0
Democratic gain from Republican			

=== District 17 ===
Iowa Senate, District 17 general election, 1974
Party	Candidate	Votes	%
Democratic	Fred Nolting	9,620	54.9
Republican	Myrna Green	7,887	45.1
Total votes		17,507	100.0
Democratic gain from Republican			

=== District 19 ===
Iowa Senate, District 19 general election, 1974
Party	Candidate	Votes	%
Republican	Clifford E. Burroughs (incumbent)	10,392	57.0
Democratic	Donald D. Clark	7,838	43.0
Total votes		18,230	100.0
Republican hold			

=== District 21 ===
Iowa Senate, District 21 general election, 1974
Party	Candidate	Votes	%
Republican	John S. Murray (incumbent)	11,539	57.5
Democratic	Tom Richards	8,514	42.5
Total votes		20,053	100.0
Republican hold			

=== District 23 ===
Iowa Senate, District 23 general election, 1974
Party	Candidate	Votes	%
Democratic	C. Joseph Coleman (incumbent)	10,560	100.0
Total votes		10,560	100.0
Democratic hold			

=== District 25 ===
Iowa Senate, District 25 Republican primary election, 1974
Party	Candidate	Votes	%
Republican	E. Kevin Kelly (incumbent)	1,171	62.8
Republican	Edgar J. Koch	693	37.2
Total votes		1,864	100.0

Iowa Senate, District 25 general election, 1974
Party	Candidate	Votes	%
Republican	E. Kevin Kelly (incumbent)	9,305	52.1
Democratic	E. Phil Vondrak	8,540	47.9
Total votes		17,845	100.0
Republican hold			

=== District 27 ===
Iowa Senate, District 27 Democratic primary election, 1974
Party	Candidate	Votes	%
Democratic	Louis P. Culver	2,466	62.5
Democratic	James T. Craford	1,480	37.5
Total votes		3,946	100.0

Iowa Senate, District 27 general election, 1974
Party	Candidate	Votes	%
Democratic	Louis P. Culver	9,545	51.0
Republican	Jewell O. Waugh	9,156	49.0
Total votes		18,701	100.0
Democratic hold			

=== District 29 ===
Iowa Senate, District 29 general election, 1974
Party	Candidate	Votes	%
Democratic	Norman Rodgers (incumbent)	10,866	52.1
Republican	Diane Glass	10,003	47.9
Total votes		20,869	100.0
Democratic hold			

=== District 31 ===
Iowa Senate, District 31 general election, 1974
Party	Candidate	Votes	%
Democratic	Earl Willits (incumbent)	9,705	62.4
Republican	Joseph B. Flatt	5,850	37.6
Total votes		15,555	100.0
Democratic hold			

=== District 33 ===
Iowa Senate, District 33 Republican primary election, 1974
Party	Candidate	Votes	%
Republican	Philip B. Hill	2,724	77.8
Republican	Russel De Jong	777	22.2
Total votes		3,501	100.0

Iowa Senate, District 33 general election, 1974
Party	Candidate	Votes	%
Republican	Philip B. Hill	11,556	58.3
Democratic	William E. Shay	8,268	41.7
Total votes		19,824	100.0
Republican hold			

=== District 35 ===
Iowa Senate, District 35 Republican primary election, 1974
Party	Candidate	Votes	%
Republican	Margaret Bovenkamp	1,160	50.1
Republican	Les Turner	1,154	49.9
Total votes		2,314	100.0

Iowa Senate, District 35 general election, 1974
Party	Candidate	Votes	%
Democratic	Eugene M. Hill (incumbent)	10,897	60.2
Republican	Margaret Bovenkamp	7,196	39.8
Total votes		18,093	100.0
Democratic hold			

=== District 37 ===
Iowa Senate, District 37 general election, 1974
Party	Candidate	Votes	%
Democratic	Minnette Doderer (incumbent)	11,866	67.7
Republican	Glen Leon Jackson	5,663	32.3
Total votes		17,529	100.0
Democratic hold			

=== District 39 ===
Iowa Senate, District 39 general election, 1974
Party	Candidate	Votes	%
Republican	Roger J. Shaff	8,954	55.2
Democratic	John James Hunter	7,255	44.8
Total votes		16,209	100.0
Republican hold			

=== District 41 ===
Iowa Senate, District 41 general election, 1974
Party	Candidate	Votes	%
Democratic	William E. "Bill" Gluba (incumbent)	8,770	69.5
Republican	Cheryl Rigdon	3,850	30.5
Total votes		12,620	100.0
Democratic hold			

=== District 43 ===
Iowa Senate, District 43 general election, 1974
Party	Candidate	Votes	%
Democratic	Lowell Junkins (incumbent)	10,320	62.4
Republican	Will Davis	6,227	37.6
Total votes		16,547	100.0
Democratic hold			

=== District 45 ===
Iowa Senate, District 45 general election, 1974
Party	Candidate	Votes	%
Democratic	Gene W. Glenn (incumbent)	11,723	100.0
Total votes		11,723	100.0
Democratic hold			

=== District 47 ===
Iowa Senate, District 47 general election, 1974
Party	Candidate	Votes	%
Republican	Richard Ramsey (incumbent)	11,514	55.2
Democratic	James W. Davis	9,356	44.8
Total votes		20,870	100.0
Republican hold			

=== District 49 ===
Iowa Senate, District 49 general election, 1974
Party	Candidate	Votes	%
Republican	Calvin Hultman (incumbent)	10,829	63.2
Democratic	Ambrose Doyle	6,295	36.8
Total votes		17,124	100.0
Republican hold			

== See also ==
- United States elections, 1974
- United States House of Representatives elections in Iowa, 1974
- Elections in Iowa
