= Branstad (disambiguation) =

Terry Branstad (born 1946) is an Iowa politician, university administrator, and diplomat. Branstad may also refer to:

- Christine Branstad, former First Lady of Iowa, wife of Terry Branstad
- Clifford Branstad (1924–2014), served in the Iowa House of Representatives, second cousin of Terry Branstad
- Eric Branstad, American lobbyist, son of Terry Branstad
- Puerto Rico v. Branstad, a 1987 extradition case decided by the Supreme Court of the United States
- Branstad, Wisconsin, an unincorporated community in the town of Grantsburg, Burnett County
