= 1990 Iowa gubernatorial election =

- November 8, 1990
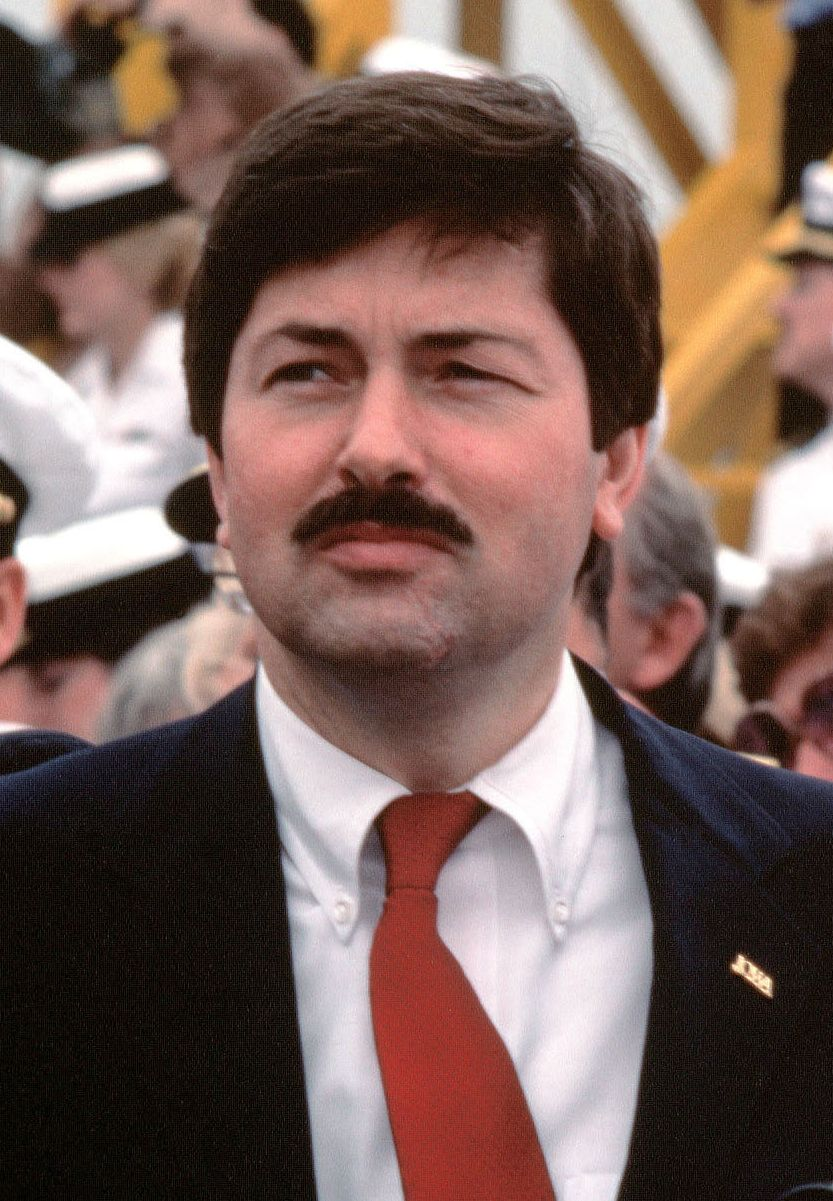

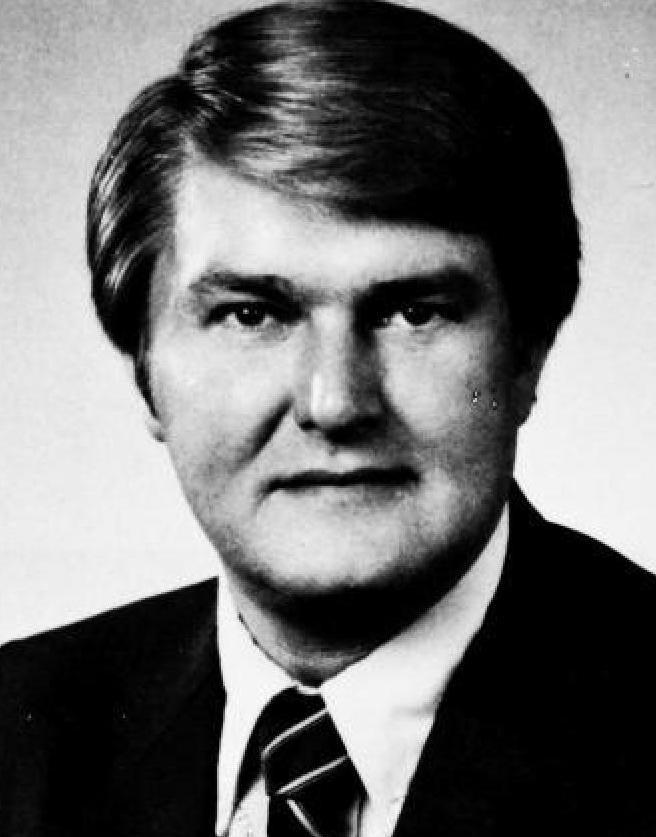
Nominee	Terry Branstad	Donald Avenson
Party	Republican	Democratic
Running mate	Joy Corning	Jo Ann Zimmerman
Popular vote	591,852	379,372
Percentage	60.61%	38.85%
- County results Branstad: 50–60% 60–70% 70–80% 80–90% Avenson: 50–60%
Governor before election
Terry Branstad
Republican
Elected Governor
Terry Branstad
Republican

The 1990 Iowa gubernatorial election took place November 8, 1990. Incumbent Republican Governor of Iowa Terry Branstad ran for re-election to a third term as governor. On the Democratic side, state representative Donald Avenson won his party's nomination and both Branstad and Avenson moved on to the general election. Branstad won re-election to a third term as governor, defeating Avenson by a margin of over 20 points.

This election is first where candidates run on a joint ticket with their respective running mates.

== Democratic primary ==
=== Candidates ===
- Donald Avenson, former Iowa State Representative
- Tom Miller, Iowa Attorney General
- Jo Ann Zimmerman, Iowa Lieutenant Governor
- John Crystal
- Darold Powers

=== Results ===
Democratic primary results
Party	Candidate	Votes	%
Democratic	Donald Avenson	79,022	39.45
Democratic	Tom Miller	63,364	31.63
Democratic	John Crystal	52,170	26.05
Democratic	Jo Ann Zimmerman	4,475	2.23
Democratic	Darold Powers	1,167	0.58
Democratic	Write-ins	107	0.05
Total votes		200,305	100.00

== Republican primary ==
=== Candidates ===
- Terry Branstad, incumbent Governor of Iowa

=== Results ===
Republican primary results
Party	Candidate	Votes	%
Republican	Terry Branstad (inc.)	94,253	99.52
Republican	Write-ins	453	0.47
Total votes		94,706	100.00

== General election ==
=== Results ===
Iowa gubernatorial election, 1990
Party	Candidate	Votes	%	±%
Republican	Terry Branstad (inc.)	591,852	60.61%	+8.70%
Democratic	Donald Avenson	379,372	38.85%	−9.14%
Socialist Workers	Nan Bailey	4,263	0.44%	
Write-ins		996	0.10%	
Turnout		976,483		
Republican hold		Swing		

== See also ==
- United States gubernatorial elections, 1990
- State of Iowa
- Governors of Iowa
