= Harry Nielsen =

Harry Nielsen may refer to:

- Harry Nielsen (cricketer) (born 1995), Australian cricketer
- Harry Nielsen (politician) (1895–1981), American politician from Iowa
- Harry Nielsen (rower) (born 1930), Danish rower
