= 1986 Iowa gubernatorial election =

- November 4, 1986
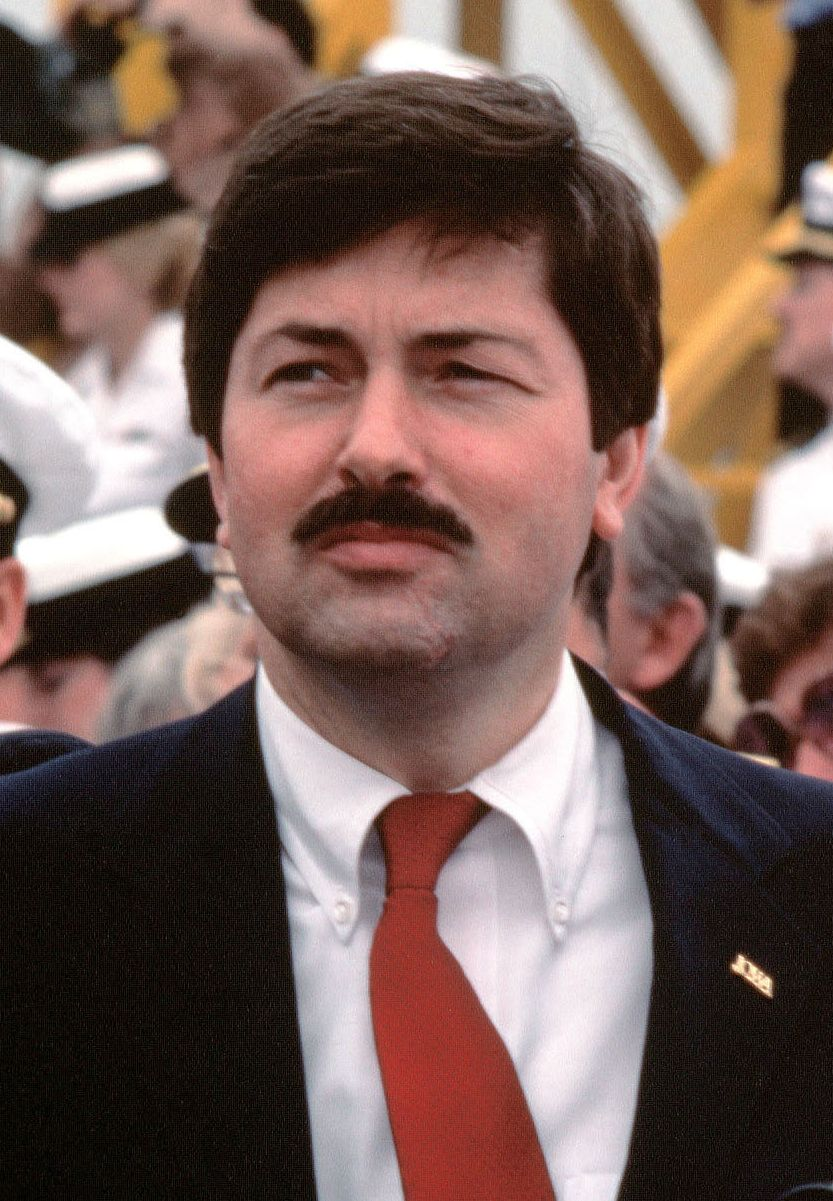

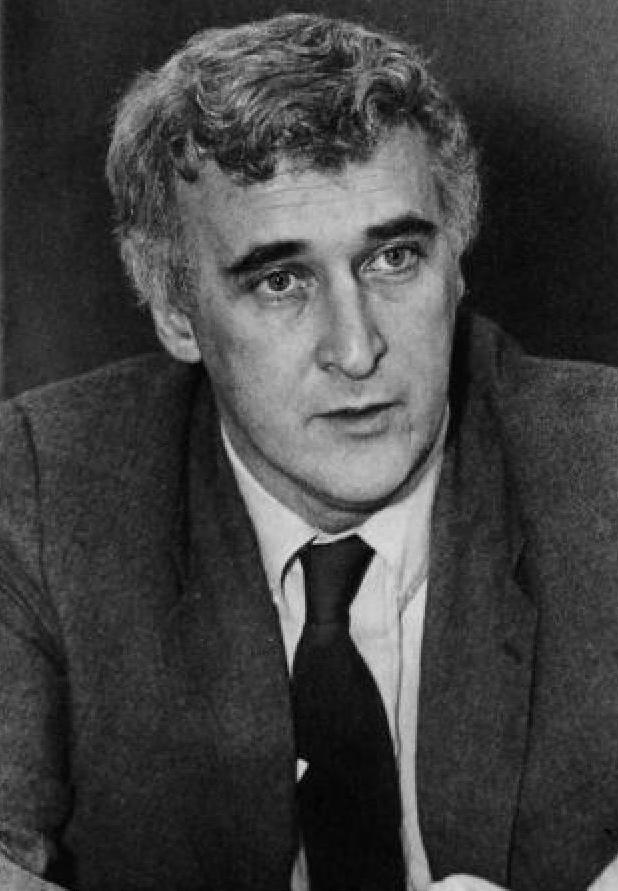
Nominee	Terry Branstad	Lowell Junkins
Party	Republican	Democratic
Popular vote	472,712	436,987
Percentage	51.91%	47.99%
- County results Branstad: 50–60% 60–70% 70–80% Junkins: 50–60% 60–70%
Governor before election
Terry Branstad
Republican
Elected Governor
Terry Branstad
Republican

The 1986 Iowa gubernatorial election was held on November 4, 1986. Incumbent Republican Terry Branstad defeated Democratic nominee Lowell Junkins with 51.91% of the vote. This election was the closest of Branstad’s six campaigns for Governor.

== Primary elections ==
Primary elections were held on June 3, 1986.

=== Democratic primary ===
==== Candidates ====
- Lowell Junkins, majority leader of the Iowa Senate
- Robert T. Anderson, incumbent Lieutenant Governor
- George Kinley, State Senator
- Clinton E. Berryhill

==== Results ====
Democratic primary results
Party	Candidate	Votes	%
Democratic	Lowell Junkins	70,605	52.62
Democratic	Robert T. Anderson	44,550	33.20
Democratic	George Kinley	15,473	11.53
Democratic	Clinton E. Berryhill	3,503	2.61
Democratic	Write-ins	60	0.04
Total votes		134,191	100.00

=== Republican primary ===
==== Candidates ====
- Terry Branstad, incumbent Governor

==== Results ====
Republican primary results
Party	Candidate	Votes	%
Republican	Terry Branstad (incumbent)	104,482	99.85
Republican	Write-ins	154	0.15
Total votes		104,636	100.00

== General election ==
=== Candidates ===
- Terry Branstad, Republican
- Lowell Junkins, Democratic

=== Results ===
1986 Iowa gubernatorial election
Party	Candidate	Votes	%	±%
Republican	Terry Branstad (incumbent)	472,712	51.91%	−0.90%
Democratic	Lowell Junkins	436,987	47.99%	+1.44%
Write-ins		924	0.10%	
Majority		35,725	3.92%	
Turnout		910,623		
Republican hold		Swing		
