= Bisenius =

Bisenius is a surname. Notable people with the surname include:

- Joe Bisenius (born 1982), American baseball player and scout
- Stephen W. Bisenius (born 1947), American politician
