= Roy Hadden =

American politician (1904–1991)

Member of the Iowa House of Representatives from the 57th district
- In office 12 January 1953 – 13 January 1957
- Preceded by: Harry Nielsen
- Succeeded by: Elroy Maule

Personal details
- Born: 7 July 1904 Monona County, Iowa
- Died: 15 December 1991 (aged 87) Whiting, Iowa
- Party: Republican

Roy Hadden (7 July 1904 – 15 December 1991) was an American politician.

Roy Hadden was the fourth of five children born to parents Lewis Hadden and Maggie Hall of Jordan Township, Monona County, Iowa, on 7 July 1904. Upon graduating from Soldier High School in 1922, he left his home county to study law, first enrolling at Morningside College between 1923 and 1925, then transferring to the University of South Dakota, which he attended until 1928. Hadden then returned to run his family farm. He married Mariam Carritt in 1931. The couple raised three children on their farm in Castana. Hadden retired from farming in 1974, and his wife died on 11 January 1981.

Politically, Hadden was affiliated with the Republican Party, and served two terms on the Iowa House of Representatives for District 57 from 1953 to 1957. In later life, Hadden moved to Pleasant View Nursing Home in Whiting, where he died on 15 December 1991.
