= 1994 Iowa gubernatorial election =

- November 8, 1994
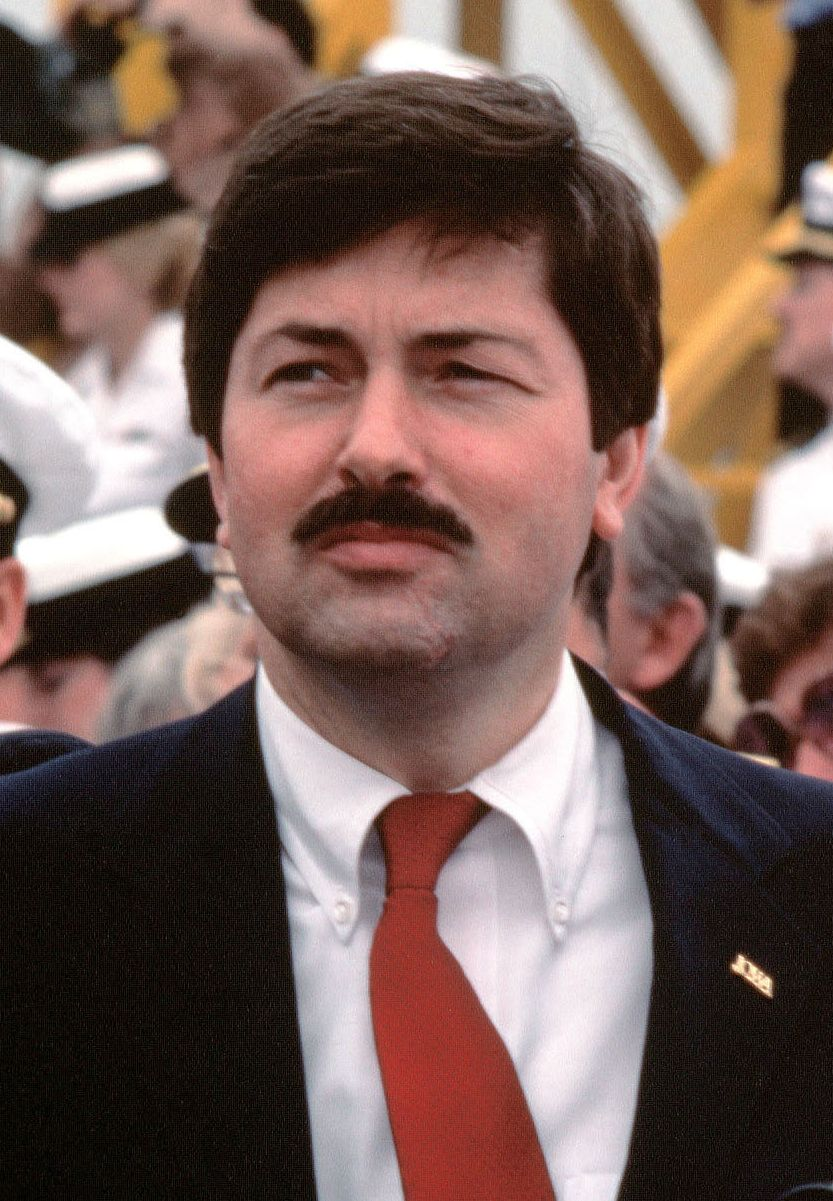

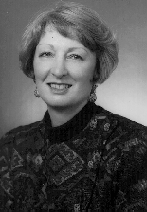
Nominee	Terry Branstad	Bonnie Campbell
Party	Republican	Democratic
Running mate	Joy Corning	Leonard Boswell
Popular vote	566,395	414,453
Percentage	56.80%	41.56%
- County results Branstad: 40–50% 50–60% 60–70% 70–80% 80–90% Campbell: 40–50% 50–60%
Governor before election
Terry Branstad
Republican
Elected Governor
Terry Branstad
Republican

The 1994 Iowa gubernatorial election took place on November 8, 1994. Incumbent Republican Governor Terry Branstad narrowly defeated a primary challenger by 11,419 votes. On the Democratic side, State Attorney General Bonnie Campbell won her party's nomination. Branstad ultimately won re-election to a fourth term as governor, defeating Campbell in a landslide. This was the last time until 2010 that a Republican was elected Governor of Iowa, when Branstad defeated incumbent Democrat Chet Culver.

== Republican primary ==
=== Candidates ===
- Terry Branstad, incumbent Governor of Iowa
- Fred Grandy, U.S. Representative from Sioux City and former actor

=== Results ===
Republican primary results
Party	Candidate	Votes	%
Republican	Terry Branstad (inc.)	161,228	51.80
Republican	Fred Grandy	149,809	48.13
Write-in		240	0.08
Total votes		311,277	100.00

== Democratic primary ==
=== Candidates ===
- Bonnie Campbell, Attorney General of Iowa
- Darold Powers
- Bill Reichardt, former State Senator from Iowa City and former Green Bay Packers football player

=== Results ===
Democratic primary results
Party	Candidate	Votes	%
Democratic	Bonnie Campbell	99,718	77.71
Democratic	Bill Reichardt	24,630	19.19
Democratic	Darold Powers	3,170	2.47
Write-in		799	0.62
Total votes		128,317	100.00

== General election ==
Governor Terry Branstad made reinstatement of the death penalty a central focus of his 1994 re-election campaign; however, despite successfully being re-elected, he was unable to implement this policy due to opposition from Democrats in the Iowa State Senate.

=== Polling ===
Source	Date	Branstad (R)	Campbell (D)
Des Moines Register	Nov. 7, 1994	47%	34%
KCCI-TV	Nov. 4, 1994	47%	43%
Cedar Rapids Gazette	Oct. 23, 1994	45%	43%
Des Moines Register	Oct. 7, 1994	45%	41%

=== Debate ===
1994 Iowa gubernatorial election debate
No.	Date	Host	Moderator	Link	Republican	Democratic
Key: P Participant A Absent N Not invited I Invited W Withdrawn						
Key: P Participant A Absent N Not invited I Invited W Withdrawn					Terry Branstad	Bonnie Campbell
1	Oct. 6, 1994	WHO-TV		C-SPAN	P	P

=== Results ===
Iowa gubernatorial election, 1994
Party	Candidate	Votes	%	±%
Republican	Terry Branstad (inc.)	566,395	56.80%	−3.81%
Democratic	Bonnie Campbell	414,453	41.56%	+2.71%
Independent	Richard O'Dell Hughes	5,505	0.55%	
Natural Law	Veronica Bells Butler	3,737	0.37%	
Libertarian	Carl Eric Olsen	2,772	0.28%	
Socialist Workers	Michael Galati	770	0.08%	−0.36%
Write-ins		3,616	0.36%	
Majority		151,942	15.24%	−6.52%
Turnout		997,248		
Republican hold		Swing		

== See also ==
- United States gubernatorial elections, 1994
- State of Iowa
- Governors of Iowa
