= Senator Corning =

Senator Corning may refer to:

- Erastus Corning 2nd (1909–1983), New York State Senate
- Joy Corning (1932–2017), Iowa State Senate
