= Jewell Waugh =

American politician

Member of the Iowa House of Representatives from the 27th district
- In office January 11, 1971 – January 7, 1973
- Preceded by: James Middleswart
- Succeeded by: James D. Wells

Member of the Iowa House of Representatives from the 57th district
- In office January 9, 1967 – January 10, 1971
- Preceded by: Elroy Maule
- Succeeded by: Earl M. Willits

Personal details
- Born: June 13, 1910 Lyons, Nebraska
- Died: November 16, 2006 (aged 96) West Branch, Iowa
- Party: Republican

Jewell Obert Waugh (June 13, 1910 – November 16, 2006) was an American politician who served in the Iowa House of Representatives from 1967 to 1973.

He died of heart failure on November 16, 2006, in West Branch, Iowa at age 96.
