= Donald Avenson =

American politician (1944–2017)

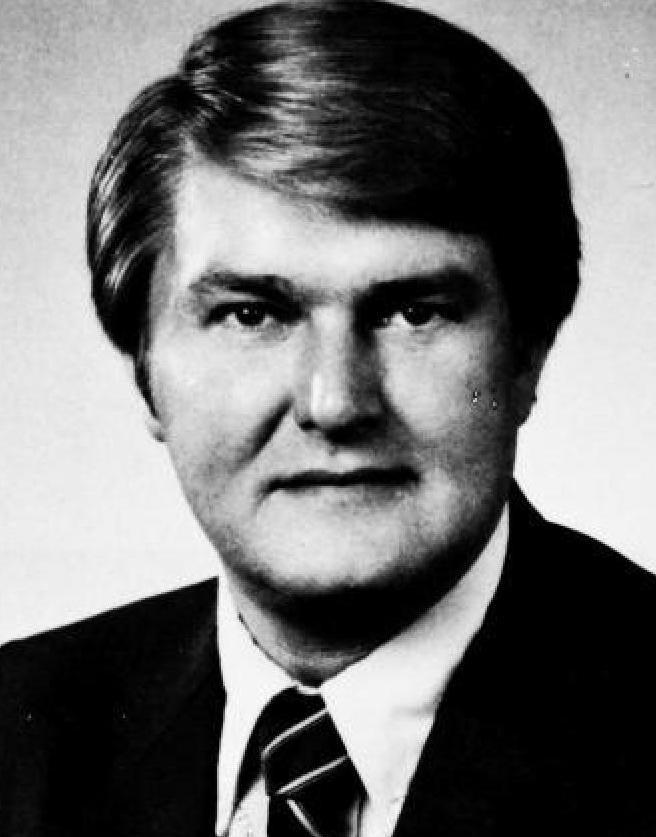

Member of the Iowa House of Representatives
- In office January 8, 1973 – January 8, 1991

Personal details
- Born: September 16, 1944 Minneapolis, Minnesota, U.S.
- Died: May 19, 2017 (aged 72) North Platte, Nebraska, U.S.
- Party: Democratic
- Occupation: Tool and die maker, office manager

Donald D. Avenson (September 16, 1944 – May 19, 2017) was an American politician in the U.S. state of Iowa who served in the Iowa House of Representatives as a member of the Democratic Party, representing Iowa's 15th House of Representatives district from 1973 to 1983 and Iowa's 28th House of Representatives district from 1983 to 1991.

== Early life ==
Avenson was born on September 16, 1944, in Minneapolis, Minnesota to Donald C. and Wilma G. Avenson. The family lived in Oelwein, Iowa, and he graduated from Oelwein Community High School in 1962.

On August 1, 1964, he married Diane Mary Duda and the couple had three children. Avenson attended the University of Wisconsin–River Falls, receiving his bachelor's degree in political science and history in 1970, and completed his graduate studies in history at the University of Northern Iowa.

== Political career ==
Avenson worked at the Oelwein Tool & Die Company. He served in the Iowa House of Representatives from 1973 to 1991, as a Democrat. He is the longest-serving Speaker of the Iowa House of Representatives in Iowan history. He unsuccessfully ran for governor in 1990, losing to Terry Branstad.

== Later life ==
Avenson died in Great Plains Medical Center in North Platte, Nebraska on May 19, 2017, from a heart attack. He was 72 years old.

Party political offices
Preceded by Lowell Junkins	Democratic nominee for Governor of Iowa; 1990	Succeeded by Bonnie Campbell
