= Bonnie Campbell (politician) =

American lawyer (born 1948)

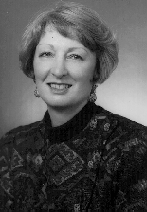

Director of the Office on Violence Against Women
- In office March 21, 1995 – January 20, 2001
- President: Bill Clinton
- Preceded by: Position established
- Succeeded by: Diane Stuart

31st Attorney General of Iowa
- In office January 11, 1991 – January 6, 1995
- Governor: Terry Branstad
- Preceded by: Tom Miller
- Succeeded by: Tom Miller

Personal details
- Born: April 9, 1948 (age 78) Norwich, New York, U.S.
- Party: Democratic
- Education: Drake University (BA, JD)

Bonnie J. Campbell (born April 9, 1948) is an American attorney and politician who served as Attorney General of Iowa from 1991 to 1995. Campbell was also a gubernatorial candidate, an official in the U.S. Department of Justice. President Clinton nominated her to be a judge on the U.S. Court of Appeals for the Eighth Circuit but the Senate never acted on her nomination.

== Early life and education ==
Born in Norwich, New York, Campbell moved to Washington, D.C., after completing high school and began working for a succession of politicians, including for United States Secretary of Housing and Urban Development, Robert C. Weaver, as a clerk-stenographer from 1965 to 1967. She then worked as a clerk for the U.S. Senate Subcommittee on Intergovernmental Relations from 1967 to 1969. She joined the office of Harold Hughes as a caseworker from 1969 to 1974. Her work for Hughes brought her to Iowa, where she took a job with John Culver as a field office coordinator from 1974 to 1981.

During her time working for Culver, Campbell pursued her undergraduate degree, earning a bachelor's degree from Drake University in 1982. She subsequently earned a Juris Doctor degree from Drake University Law School in 1984. She worked as a lawyer in private practice in Iowa from 1985 to 1991, and also was the chairwoman of the Iowa Democratic Party from 1987 until 1991.

== Career ==
In 1990, Campbell won election as Iowa's attorney general as a Democrat, defeating her Republican opponent, Ed Kelly. She is known most during her time as attorney general for having written an anti-stalking law that became a national blueprint. In 1994, Campbell ran for governor but lost to incumbent Terry Branstad. On March 21, 1995, Bill Clinton appointed Campbell to head the United States Department of Justice's newly created Office on Violence Against Women.

In 1997, Time magazine named Campbell one of the magazine's 25 most influential Americans.

=== Nomination to the Eighth Circuit ===
On March 2, 2000, President Clinton nominated Campbell to the Eighth Circuit vacancy created by the retirement of George Gardner Fagg. The Eighth Circuit was and is the least gender diverse of all the circuits, having had only two women judges, Diana Murphy and Jane Kelly. While she had the official backing of both Democrat Tom Harkin and Chuck Grassley, Campbell had supported Bill Clinton rather than Tom Harkin in the presidential race. Republicans in the Senate targeted her nomination, noting that she had angered Christian conservatives during her 1994 gubernatorial run by saying, "I hate to call them Christian because I am Christian, and I hate to call them religious, because they're not, so I'll call them the radical right."

While the Senate Committee on the Judiciary did conduct a hearing on her judicial nomination on May 25, 2000, with less than eight months remaining before Clinton's presidency ended, the Republican-led Committee never voted on her nomination, preventing the Senate from ever taking a full voice vote. Clinton renominated her on January 3, 2001, but her nomination was returned by newly elected president George W. Bush on March 20, 2001, along with 61 other executive and judicial nominations Clinton had made. Michael Joseph Melloy was eventually nominated by Bush, and was confirmed by the Senate on February 11, 2002.

=== Later career ===
After Clinton's term ended, Campbell joined the Washington, D.C., law firm Arent Fox. She moved back to Iowa in 2003 and opened a private legal practice. In 2007, she was appointed by Gov. Chet Culver to the Iowa Board of Regents.

In the 2020 Democratic Party presidential primaries, Campbell endorsed former Vice President Joe Biden.

== See also ==
- Bill Clinton judicial appointment controversies
- List of female state attorneys general in the United States

Legal offices
Preceded by Tom Miller	Attorney General of Iowa; 1991–1995	Succeeded by Tom Miller
Party political offices
Preceded by Tom Miller	Democratic nominee for Attorney General of Iowa; 1990	Succeeded by Tom Miller
Preceded by Donald Avenson	Democratic nominee for Governor of Iowa; 1994	Succeeded by Tom Vilsack
