= Elroy Maule =

American politician

Member of the Iowa House of Representatives from the 57th district
- In office January 14, 1957 – January 8, 1967
- Preceded by: Roy Hadden
- Succeeded by: Jewell Waugh

Personal details
- Born: May 16, 1913 Mondamin, Iowa
- Died: April 19, 1984 (aged 70) Onawa, Iowa
- Party: Democratic

Elroy Maule (May 16, 1913 – April 19, 1984) was an American politician who served in the Iowa House of Representatives from the 57th district from 1957 to 1967.

He died of cancer on April 19, 1984, in Onawa, Iowa at age 70.
