= Jo Ann Zimmerman =

American politician (1936–2019)

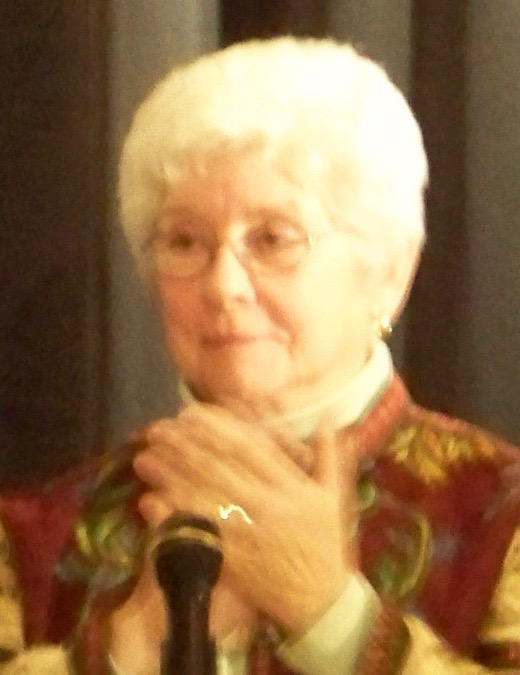

42nd Lieutenant Governor of Iowa
- In office January 16, 1987 – January 18, 1991
- Governor: Terry Branstad
- Preceded by: Robert T. Anderson
- Succeeded by: Joy Corning

Member of the Iowa House of Representatives from the 89th district
- In office January 10, 1983 – January 11, 1987
- Preceded by: Charles Poncy
- Succeeded by: Wayne McKinney

Personal details
- Born: Jo Ann McIntosh; December 24, 1936 Van Buren County, Iowa, U.S.
- Died: October 22, 2019 (aged 82) Des Moines, Iowa, U.S.
- Party: Democratic
- Spouse: Tom Zimmerman
- Profession: Nurse

Jo Ann McIntosh Zimmerman (December 24, 1936 – October 22, 2019) was an American democratic politician who served as the 42nd Lieutenant Governor of Iowa from 1987 to 1991. She was the first woman to serve in the office of Lieutenant Governor in Iowa history. She also served as a nurse and congresswoman previously, while also being involved in various administrative organizations. Zimmerman was an advocate for women's and farmers' rights.

== Early life ==
Zimmerman was born on December 24, 1936, to Russell and Hazel McIntosh, in Van Buren County, Iowa as the eldest of three children. She graduated from Keosauqua High School (located in Keosauqua, Iowa) as valedictorian of her class in 1954. During her high school years, she helped to establish the first Girls Scout troop in Keosauqua and was active in fine arts, such as band and drama. After graduation, Zimmerman entered the Broadlawns Hospital School of Nursing in Des Moines, Iowa and completed her nursing degree in 1958. The same year, Zimmerman also became an assistant head nurse of the maternity department at Broadlawns. Later on, Zimmerman was promoted to supervisor of the maternity department in 1966 and became a maternity nursing instructor in 1968. She continued to pursue education and graduated with Bachelor of Arts from Drake University. Zimmerman completed her graduate work at Iowa University.

In 1956, she married Tom Zimmerman, and had five children: Andy, Lisa, twins Don and Ron, and Beth.

== Political career ==
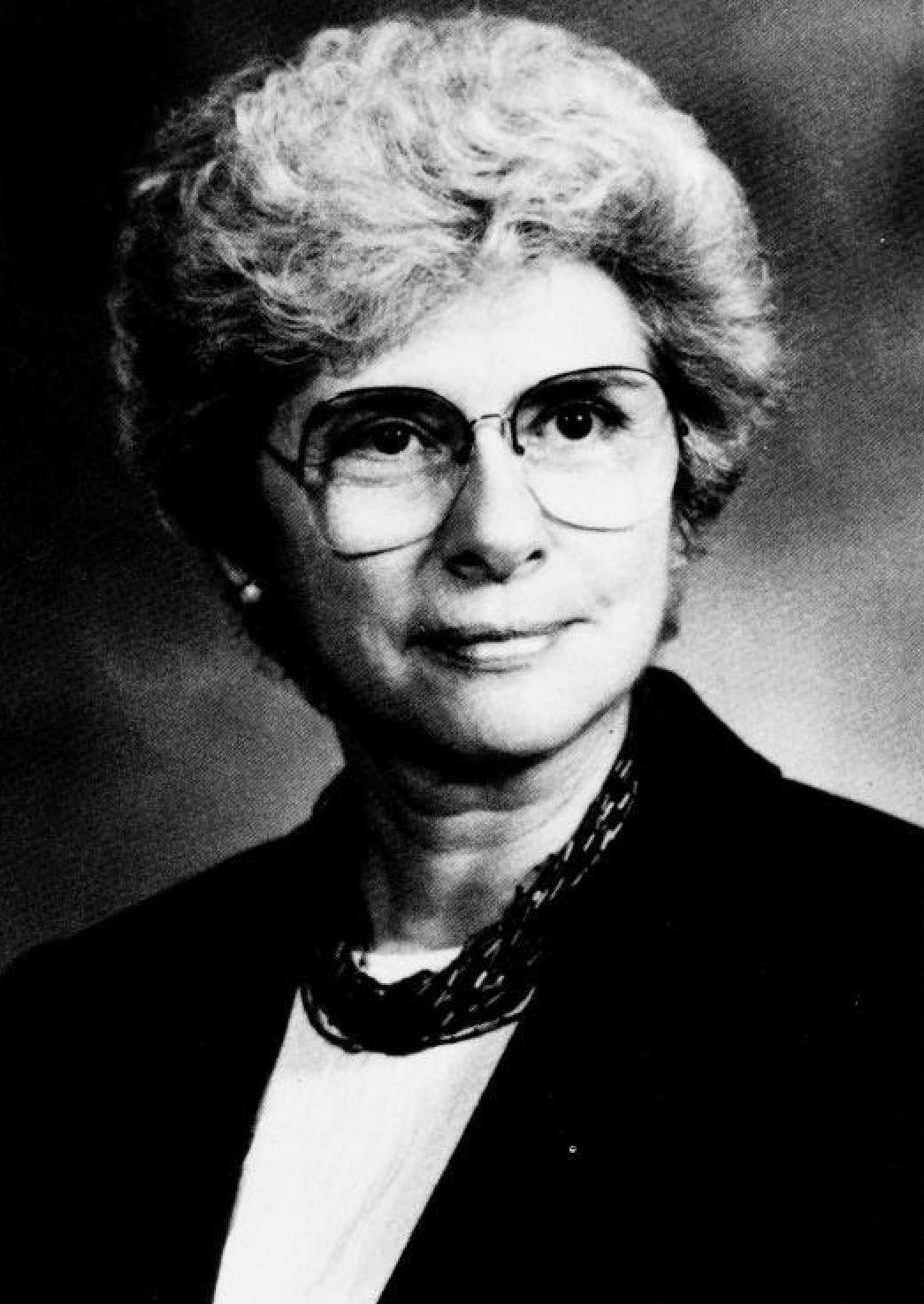
As Lieutenant Governor

In 1982, Zimmerman won election to the Iowa House of Representatives where she advocated for improved healthcare, cleaner air, and living wills. She also won the 1986 election for Lieutenant Governor of Iowa, separately from Governor Terry Branstad. Winning the Lt. Governor election meant that she was to serve as President of the Senate. Zimmerman was the first women to serve as Lt. Governor in Iowa history, and she was the second Democratic Lt. Governor to serve a Republican governor. As Lt. Governor, Zimmerman advocated for the elimination of her own office (as it was considered a figurehead position) and championed other progressive causes in her position. Certain policies Zimmerman was involved in included the passage of the ERA, refinement of abortion rights, creation of a statewide library system, and establishment of government programs focused on providing assistance to the elderly. Zimmerman briefly entered the 1990 gubernatorial election to unseat incumbent governor Branstad, but dropped out to run on the Iowa Democratic Party ticket as Lt. Governor with Donald Avenson (who subsequently lost to Branstad). She left office in 1991 after being defeated by Republican Joy Corning.

== Post-political career ==
Zimmerman raised cattle on her family's farm. During the 1980s farms crisis, the Zimmerman family faced losing their 292-acre farm in a sheriff's auction due to bank foreclosure. Despite not being in government, Jo Ann Zimmerman still worked to improve farmers' and women's rights. In 1992, she co-founded the Democratic Activists Women's Network (DAWN, now known as Emerge Iowa) with the goal of helping more Democratic women get elected to office. Zimmerman also gathered nurses throughout Iowa to form the Nurses for Harkin advocacy group that became an unbiased health advisor to the US Senator. Other positions she served on included Des Moines Pastoral Counseling Center Board of Directors, and the Iowa Nurses Association Board. The AFSMCE, the FINE Educational Research Foundation, and the Roundtable for Women Legislators are also organizations Zimmerman engaged with. According to the US Presidency Project, Zimmerman also joined over 100 Iowa women who were or are currently elected officials in endorsing Hillary Clinton for the 2016 presidential election.

On August 27, 2005, Jo Ann Zimmerman was inducted into Iowa Women's Hall of Fame with three other inductees: Johnie Wright Hammond, Brenda LaBlanc, and Susan Schechter. The Iowa Commission on the Status of Women (ICSW) sponsored the event, and Lieutenant Governor Sally J. Pederson alongside ICSW Chair Kimberly Painter presented the award to the recipients.

== Death ==
Zimmerman died of pulmonary fibrosis complications on October 22, 2019, at the age of 82. She had been suffering from the disease for about 8 years previously. A visitation service and her memorial service were both hosted by the First Christian Church in Des Moines, Iowa. Iowa governor Kim Reynolds also ordered the flags to be flown at half-mast for two days in her honor.

== See also ==
- List of female lieutenant governors in the United States

Party political offices
Preceded by Robert T. Anderson	Democratic nominee for Lieutenant Governor of Iowa; 1986, 1990	Succeeded by Leonard Boswell
Political offices
Preceded by Robert T. Anderson	Lieutenant Governor of Iowa; 1987–1991	Succeeded by Joy Corning
