= Steve Sovern =

American politician (born 1942)

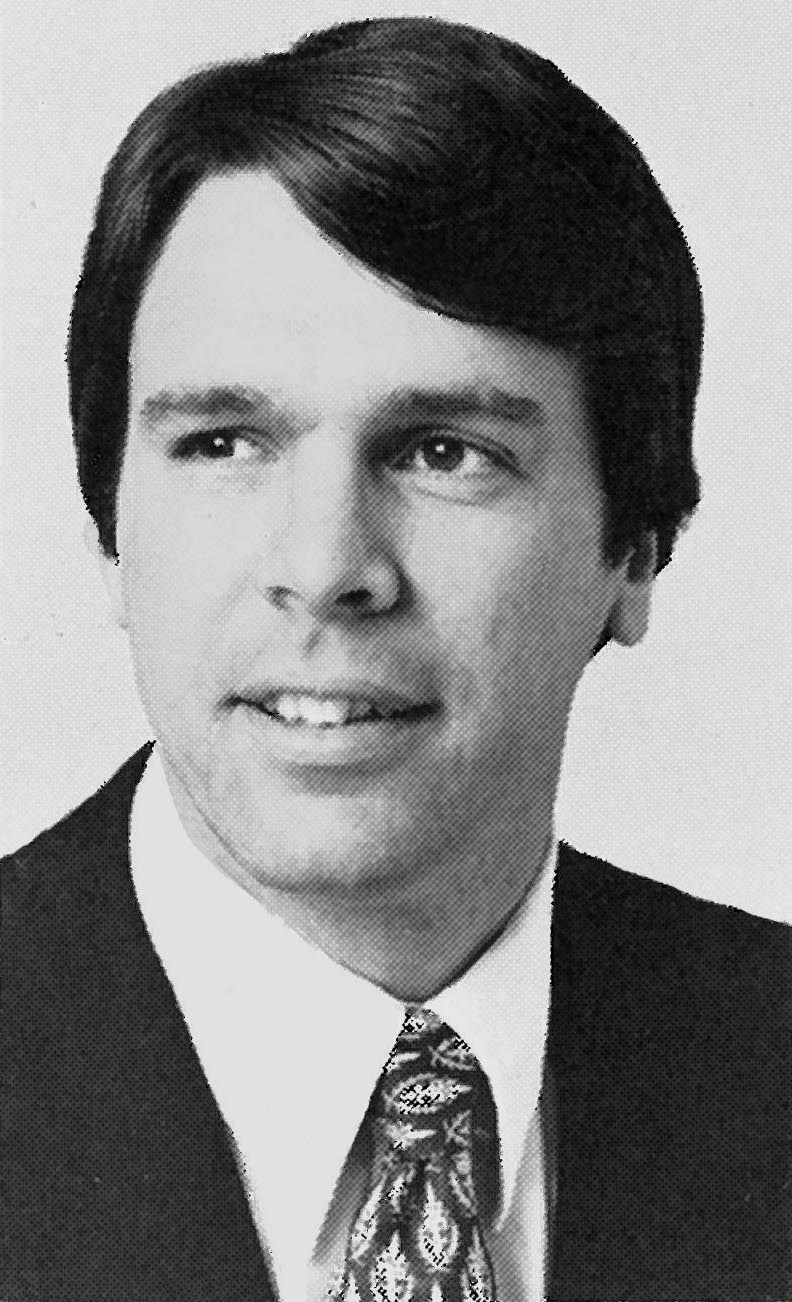

Member of the Iowa Senate from the 15th district
- In office January 13, 1975 – January 9, 1976
- Preceded by: Ralph Wilson Potter
- Succeeded by: Bob Rush

Personal details
- Born: January 20, 1942 (age 84) Near Davenport, Iowa, U.S.
- Party: Democratic

Steve Sovern (born January 20, 1942) is an American politician, businessman, and mediator who served as an Iowa State Senator from District 15 (1975–1976).

== Early life and education ==
Born in January 1942, Steven Harold Sovern was the youngest of three children born to parents Harold and Elizabeth Sovern. The family lived in Monticello, Iowa but later settled in Cedar Rapids, Iowa, where Sovern graduated from Washington High School in 1960. A basketball standout, he received a scholarship from Marquette University in Milwaukee, Wisconsin and played there, graduating in 1964 with a bachelor's degree in psychology. In 1965, Sovern married Bonnie Smolinski, with whom he raised three children.

== Career ==
Sovern led Nesper Sign Company in Cedar Rapids, his family's business, until 1990 when he sold the company. After attending law school at the University of Iowa, he began work as a mediator, establishing his own firm, Sovern Mediation.

== Political career ==
In 1970, Sovern ran for and won a seat on the Cedar Rapids Community School District board of education, his first political victory.

In 1974, Sovern ran for the Iowa State Senate representing District 15, winning against incumbent Ralph Wilson Potter. He served from 1975 to 1976. During this period, Sovern was active in several committees and councils, serving as the Vice Chair on the Education Committee and co-chair on the Land Use Study Committee, where he helped to plan a forum for the analysis of House File 505 and the land use issues surrounding the bill.

In 1980, he ran as the Democratic nominee for Iowa's 2nd congressional district against Republican Tom Tauke but was unsuccessful.

In 1990, Sovern made another bid for the U.S. House of Representatives in Iowa's 2nd congressional district. Sovern took a firm stance against accepting Political Action Committee (PAC) contributions, making him one of only two House candidates nationwide to refuse PAC money that year. He attended a Democratic Congressional Campaign Committee (DCCC) candidate workshop in Washington, D.C., where he challenged the party's emphasis on PAC fundraising. Sovern lost the Democratic primary to Eric Tabor, who had previously been one of the highest PAC-funded challengers in the nation. Tabor went on to lose the general election to Republican Jim Nussle.

After his congressional campaigns, Sovern remained active in Democratic Party politics, particularly in Cedar Rapids and Linn County, Iowa. In 2020, he continued his involvement by hosting campaign events for presidential candidates, including an event for Elizabeth Warren's campaign featuring California Representative Katie Porter as a surrogate. Despite his initial skepticism about surrogate events, the gathering at his Cedar Rapids condominium drew 45 attendees and proved successful in garnering support for Warren's campaign.

== Community involvement ==
Sovern serves on the board of ConnectCR, a Cedar Rapids organization dedicated to improving the Cedar Lake area. As board treasurer and an early promoter of the Alliant Energy LightLine pedestrian bridge project, he played a significant role in the development of what was originally known as the "Sleeping Giant" project.

The project involves replacing a historic railroad bridge that was built around 1865 and partially destroyed in the 2008 flood. Sovern began advocating for the bridge's redevelopment in 2014 while serving on the Southside Investment Board, focusing on the future of the NewBo neighborhood. Through his research into the bridge's history, he discovered connections to Cedar Rapids' past, including its original builders Stephen L. Dows, John F. Ely, and Charles E. Ives. The bridge served as a crucial link for Czech immigrant workers accessing the Sinclair packing plant.

The new $20 million bridge project, scheduled to begin construction in late 2024, will feature a 165-foot tower outlined in LED lights and will connect the NewBo District on the east side of the river to the Czech Village District on the west. The project plans to incorporate elements of the original bridge into historical signage, preserving the structure's connection to Cedar Rapids' industrial and cultural heritage.
