= Christine Branstad =

American politician

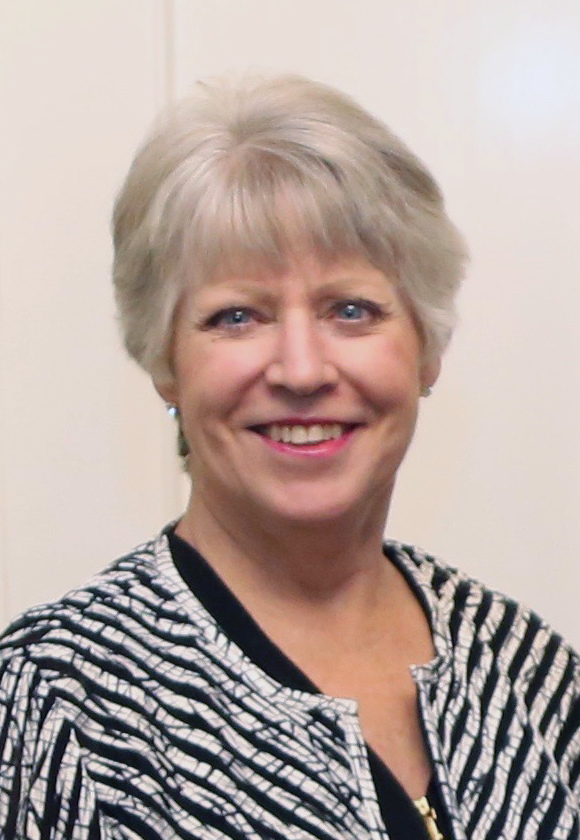
- Branstad in 2018

First Lady of Iowa
- In role January 14, 2011 – May 24, 2017
- Governor: Terry Branstad
- Preceded by: Mariclare Culver
- Succeeded by: Kevin Reynolds (First Gentleman)
- In role January 14, 1983 – January 15, 1999
- Preceded by: Billie Ray
- Succeeded by: Christie Vilsack

Personal details
- Born: Christine Ann Johnson c. 1950 (aged c. 74) Fort Dodge, Iowa, United States
- Party: Republican
- Spouse: Terry Branstad (m. 1972)
- Children: Eric, 1 daughter and 1 other son
- Education: Des Moines Area Community College

Christine Ann Branstad (born c. 1950) is an American public figure, health activist, and retired medical assistant who served as the First Lady of Iowa for six nonconsecutive terms during the tenure of her husband, Governor Terry Branstad, from 1983 to 1999 and again from 2011 until 2017. She holds the record as Iowa's longest serving first lady, having spent over 22 years in the position. In addition to her record as Iowa's first lady, Christine Branstad is the longest serving first lady of any U.S. state in the country's history.

== Biography ==
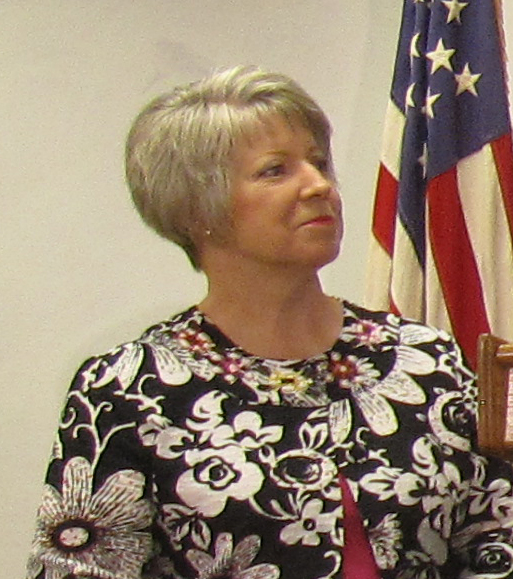
Branstad in 2010

Branstad was born Christine Ann Johnson in Fort Dodge, Iowa to Richard and Clara Johnson. She is the oldest of 5 siblings. She married her husband, future Iowa Governor Terry Branstad on June 17, 1972. The couple had three children - Eric, Allison, and Marcus.

Branstad became First Lady of Iowa in January 1983 following the election of Terry Branstad to his first term as governor. She served as First Lady from 1983 until 1999 while simultaneously raising her children at the governor's residence. (Their youngest son, Marcus, was born while the Branstads were in office). As first lady, Christine Branstad focused on public health issues, including substance abuse, health and safety, and children's healthcare. In 1992, she earned her degree from Des Moines Area Community College with honors. She went on to work as a certified medical assistant in the Des Moines metro area during the 1990s and 2000s. More recently, after leaving office in 1999, she worked as volunteer several schools throughout central Iowa and the Boone County Hospital, including as President of the Boone County Hospital Auxiliary. Additionally, Branstad serves of the board of directors of the Des Moines Symphony and the Food Bank of Iowa.

Christine Branstad returned for a fifth term as First Lady in 2010 following Terry Branstad's election in 2010. At the time, Branstad admitted that she thought she had moved on from life as a public figure before the 2010 gubernatorial campaign. Governor Branstad won re-election to an unprecedented sixth term in 2014, making Christine Branstad the longest serving First Lady in Iowa's history. In a break with tradition, no new doll of First Lady Branstad was created in 2014 to mark the election. It had been traditional that a doll of each of Iowa's 41 first ladies, wearing their inaugural gowns, be created and displayed Iowa State Capitol. The dolls, which are now a tourist attraction, was started by Branstad's predecessor, Billie Ray, during the 1970s.

Governor Terry Branstad became the longest serving state governor in U.S. history in 2015. Likewise, Christine Branstad also holds the record as the longest serving state first lady in history as well. Christine Branstad's tenure as first lady ended in 2017, following 22 years and 8,169 days in office, when Governor Terry Branstad resigned from office to become the United States Ambassador to China. She was succeeded by First Gentleman Kevin Reynolds, the first man to hold the position in Iowa's history.

Honorary titles
Preceded by Mariclare Culver	First Lady of Iowa; 2010–2017	Succeeded by Kevin Reynolds
Preceded by Billie Ray	First Lady of Iowa; 1983–1999	Succeeded by Christie Vilsack
