= Lowell Junkins =

American politician and candidate for governor of Iowa

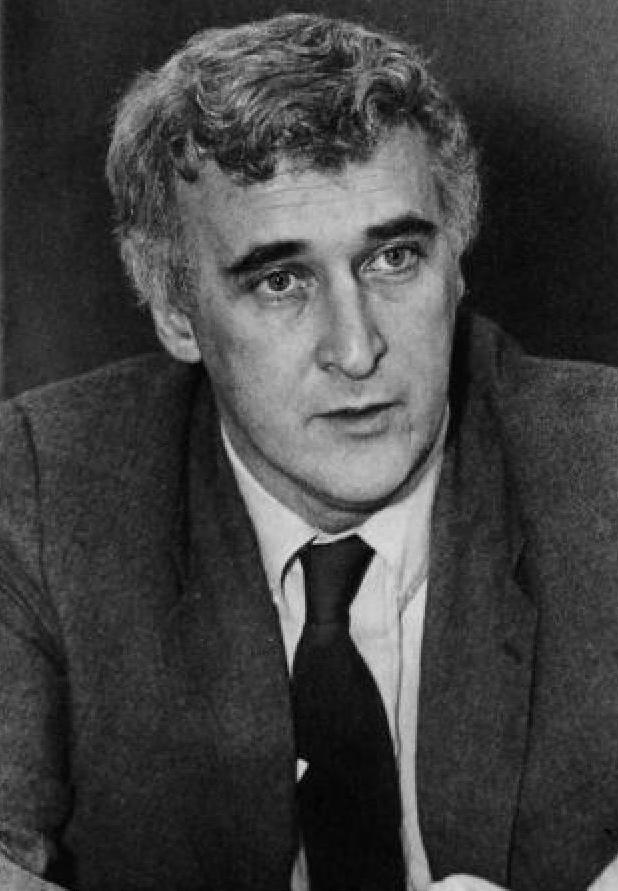

Majority Leader of the Iowa Senate
- In office January 10, 1983 – December 1, 1985
- Preceded by: Calvin Hultman
- Succeeded by: Bill Hutchins

Minority Leader of the Iowa Senate
- In office January 8, 1979 – January 10, 1983
- Preceded by: Calvin Hultman
- Succeeded by: Calvin Hultman

Member of the Iowa State Senate
- In office January 8, 1973 – December 1, 1985
- Preceded by: Wilson Davis
- Succeeded by: Gene Fraise
- Constituency: 43rd district (1973–1983); 31st district (1983–1985)

Personal details
- Born: March 9, 1944 (age 82) Fort Madison, Iowa, U.S.
- Party: Democratic
- Spouse: Linda Decker
- Children: 2
- Occupation: real estate developer, businessman, farmer

Lowell L. Junkins (born March 9, 1944) is an American politician in the state of Iowa.

Junkins was born in Fort Madison, Iowa to Ralph and Selma Junkins and attended Iowa State University. He served in the Iowa Senate from 1973 to 1985, as a Democrat. He resigned from the State Senate in 1985 to unsuccessfully run for Governor in 1986, losing to Terry Branstad. He was succeeded in the State Senate by Democrat Gene Fraise.

Party political offices
Preceded by Roxanne Conlin	Democratic nominee for Governor of Iowa; 1986	Succeeded by Donald Avenson
