= Arthur R. Kudart =

American lawyer and politician (1930–2026)

Member of the Iowa State Senate
- In office 1979–1983

Personal details
- Born: July 27, 1930 Mount Vernon, Iowa, U.S.
- Died: September 18, 2026 (aged 96) Chicago, Illinois, U.S.
- Party: Republican
- Occupation: lawyer

Arthur Ronald "Bud" Kudart (July 27, 1930 – September 18, 2026) was an American politician in the state of Iowa.

== Life and career ==
Kudart was born in Mount Vernon, Iowa, on July 27, 1930. He attended Cornell College and the University of Iowa and was a lawyer. Kudart served in the Iowa State Senate from 1979 to 1983 as a Republican.

Kudart died on September 18, 2026, at the age of 96.
