= Robert T. Anderson (politician) =

American politician

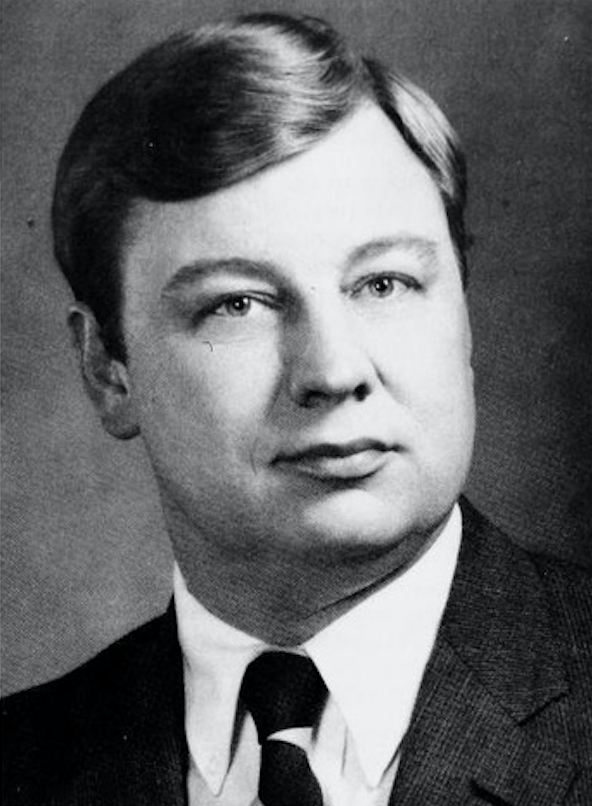

41st Lieutenant Governor of Iowa
- In office January 14, 1983 – January 16, 1987
- Governor: Terry Branstad
- Preceded by: Terry Branstad
- Succeeded by: Jo Ann Zimmerman

Member of the Iowa House of Representatives from the 69th district
- In office January 13, 1975 – January 9, 1983
- Preceded by: Norman Roorda
- Succeeded by: Robert J. Grandia

Personal details
- Born: March 8, 1945 (age 81) Marshalltown, Iowa, U.S.
- Party: Democratic
- Profession: Teacher

Robert T. Anderson (born March 8, 1945) is an American politician who was the Lieutenant Governor of Iowa from 1983 to 1987. A Democrat, he was the last male to be elected as Lieutenant Governor of Iowa until Adam Gregg was elected in 2018. Anderson was the first Democrat in Iowa history elected Lieutenant Governor alongside a Republican Governor.

Anderson received his bachelor's and master's degrees from the University of Iowa. He then became a high school teacher before being elected to the Iowa House of Representatives.

Since leaving office, Anderson has focused on humanitarian causes. In 1987, he founded the Iowa Peace Institute, and, in 1991, founded the Iowa Resource for International Service (IRIS). Anderson was a sponsor for Thai Dam refugees in the 1970s and 80s. He led programs to assist Iraqi refugees in Iowa from 2008 to 2009, and was named Immigrant Entrepreneurial Champion in 2009. Prior to his retirement, he also served as executive director of the Institute for Tomorrow's Workforce, an initiative to improve k-12 educational opportunity in Iowa. He received the Outstanding Alumni for Service award from the University of Iowa in 2013.

== Personal life ==
Anderson and his wife reside in Gig Harbor, Washington. He is an active volunteer Court Appointed Special Advocate, facilitates a Youth Suicide Prevention Coalition and is active with youth through the Midday Rotary Club of Gig Harbor.

Party political offices
Preceded by William D. Palmer	Democratic nominee for Lieutenant Governor of Iowa; 1982	Succeeded by Jo Ann Zimmerman
Political offices
Preceded by Terry E. Branstad	Lieutenant Governor of Iowa; 1983–1987	Succeeded by Jo Ann Zimmerman
