= Eric Branstad =

American political consultant

Personal details
- Born: 1975 (age 50–51)
- Party: Republican
- Children: 4 daughters
- Relatives: Christine Branstad (mother); Terry Branstad (father)
- Education: Rockhurst University (BA)

Eric Branstad (born 1975) is an American political consultant, lobbyist, and public relations professional. He is the son of Terry Branstad, the former Governor of Iowa and US Ambassador to China. In 2023, it was announced that he would serve as a senior advisor to Donald Trump's 2024 presidential campaign in Iowa.

== Early and personal life ==
Branstad is the son of Terry and Christine Branstad. He has two younger siblings, Allison and Marcus.

In 1991, Branstad was involved in a car crash that killed two people. He paid $34.50 in fines and court costs for improper passing. The relatively light penalty was seen by many Iowans as an example of his father's political influence. In 1992, Branstad was convicted of public intoxication at an after-school party. In January 1993, Branstad pleaded guilty to using a fake ID in an attempt to purchase alcohol. In June 1993, Branstad, then 17 years old, was a passenger of a crashed vehicle that was registered to his father and was charged with illegal possession of alcohol. After this series of run-ins with the law, Branstad was sent to Wentworth Military Academy and College.

Branstad is a graduate of Rockhurst University. He is married to Adrianna and has four daughters.

== Political activities ==
=== George W. Bush 2004 presidential campaign ===
Branstad was named field director for the George W. Bush 2004 presidential campaign.

=== Lobbying activities ===
Following the Bush 2004 campaign, Branstad was named Deputy Finance Director of the Republican Party of Iowa. He subsequently spent two years as an Account Manager with the Lincoln Strategies Group (a firm co-founded by Charles W. Larson Jr., the son of a political appointee by Branstad's father) and the Development Director for Iowans for Tax Relief. In 2011, he co-founded the Des Moines-based consulting firm, Matchpoint Strategies.

Branstad is a longtime lobbyist for the ethanol and biofuels industries. He was state director for America's Renewable Future, a pro-ethanol group opposed to the candidacy of Ted Cruz in the 2016 Republican Party presidential primaries due to Cruz's position on the Renewable Fuel Standard, a mandate that "requires corn-based ethanol and other biofuels be blended with gasoline." On January 9, 2016, Branstad's father Governor Terry Branstad called for Ted Cruz's defeat due to Cruz's rejection of ethanol subsidies. On the night of the 2016 Iowa Republican presidential caucuses, Branstad publicly spoke on Donald Trump's behalf at a middle school in Des Moines. After Cruz won the 2016 Iowa Republican presidential caucuses, the elder Branstad accused Cruz of underhanded tactics.

In February 2018, Branstad was announced as the head of Mercury Public Affairs LLC (a subsidiary of the Omnicom Group) new office in Des Moines, Iowa.

=== Donald Trump 2016 presidential campaign ===
In March 2016, Branstad tweeted in defense of Donald Trump for mocking the appearance of Ted Cruz's wife, Heidi.

In June 2016, Branstad was named Iowa state director for Trump 2016. After Trump won the 2016 presidential election, Branstad served as a liaison to governors in Trump's inaugural committee. After Trump took office, Branstad was appointed senior White House adviser to the Commerce Department.

=== Donald Trump 2020 presidential campaign ===
Branstad was a senior advisor to Trump Victory 2020, the joint fundraising committee between the Trump 2020 campaign and the Republican National Committee.

=== Donald Trump 2024 presidential campaign ===
In August 2021, Branstad was hired by Trump's Save America PAC, fueling speculations that Trump may run again in 2024.

In January 2023, Branstad was hired by Trump 2024 presidential campaign.

== Controversies ==
=== Proposed nuclear technology sharing with Saudi Arabia ===
While working at the Department of Commerce, Branstad became entangled in a controversy involving Rick Gates and Tom Barrack. Barrack was pitching a proposal to share nuclear technology with Saudi Arabia and asked Gates to ask Branstad to facilitate a meeting about this proposal with Commerce Secretary, Wilbur Ross. The House Oversight Committee later found that Barrack stood to profit from this proposal.

=== Defense contract with Romania ===
In 2017, Republican fundraiser Elliot Broidy entered into a defense contract with Romania, but needed the endorsement of the Commerce Department. Rick Gates asked Branstad to pass along the request to Commerce Department staff and an endorsement was granted.

=== Business ties to China ===
Eric's business activities in China came under scrutiny while his father was US Ambassador to China, particularly his effort to overturn the Trump administration's ban on Chinese technology company, ZTE. His father, Terry, denied the allegation that Branstad profited from his father's role as US Ambassador to China.
