= Richard Ramsey =

American politician

Member of the Iowa State Senate
- In office January 8, 1973 – January 9, 1983

Personal details
- Born: November 23, 1940 (age 85) Clarke County, Iowa, United States
- Party: Republican
- Occupation: Attorney

Richard R. Ramsey (born November 23, 1940) is an American politician in the state of Iowa.

== Early life ==
Ramsey was born in Osceola, Clarke County, Iowa. He graduated from the University of Northern Iowa and the University of Iowa College of Law.

Ramsey served in the armed forces for a year during the Vietnam War.

== Political career ==
Ramsey was twice elected attorney for Clarke County, serving for four years. He was Clarke County Republican chairman during the same period. He served Iowa Senate from 1973 to 1983. His initial election was won by 27 votes against opponent Arlo Hullinger, with Democratic Party officials alleging there had been irregularities in the handling of absentee ballots. As senator, he served as chairman for the Energy Committee and the Ethics Committee.

After leaving the senate, Ramsey joined the Job Service of Iowa appeal board. In August 1983, he joined the staff of Iowa governor Terry Branstad as an aide. He served as Branstad's legislative lobbyist for the 1984 session of the Iowa General Assembly.

In 1984, Ramsey became executive director of Iowa's Criminal and Juvenile Justice Planning Agency. On his position within the agency, Branstad said "I believe someone with Dick's ability as a lawyer can make a real contribution to its long-term role in state government".

During the 1990s, Ramsey served as chairman for the Public Employment Relations Board. He was succeeded by Richard Moore in 1998.

== Personal life ==
In 1984, Ramsey and his wife, Natalie, had four children.

Iowa Senate
Preceded by Charles Laverty	47th district 1973–1983	Succeeded by Calvin Hultman
