= John S. Murray (Iowa politician) =

American politician (born 1939)

John S. Murray (born 22 March 1939) is an American politician and lawyer from Iowa.

Murray was born in Ames, Iowa on 22 March 1939 to parents William and Mildred. He graduated from Ames High School in 1957, then earned his bachelor's degree from Cornell University in 1961, followed by a master's degree at Columbia University in 1962. At Cornell, Murray was captain of the track team, and a member of the Quill and Dagger society. In 2009, he was inducted into the university's Hall of Fame.

Murray served in the United States Marines from 1962 to 1965 with the rank of lieutenant, and subsequently returned to Iowa. He obtained a Juris Doctor degree at the University of Iowa College of Law in 1968. Murray worked for Robert D. Ray between 1970 and 1972. Later that year, he was elected to the Iowa Senate as a Republican legislator for District 21. Murray remained in office until 1983.

From 1999-2005 Murray was a member of the faculty of the Maxwell School of Citizenship and Public Affairs at Syracuse University, where he was Professor of Practice. In that capacity Murray served as Associate Director of the Program on the Analysis and Resolution of Conflicts (PARC). He led work on applied conflict management, teaching mediation and organizing PARC's annual Summer Institute for Creative Conflict Resolution.
