= Fred Nolting =

American politician (1932–2016)

Fred W. Nolting

Member of the Iowa State Senate
- In office 1975–1979

Member of the Iowa House of Representatives
- In office 1969–1971

Personal details
- Born: August 21, 1932 (age 94) near Frederika, Iowa, United States
- Died: April 22, 2016 (aged 83) Denton, Texas
- Party: Democratic
- Occupation: meat cutter

Fred W. Nolting (August 21, 1932 - April 22, 2016) was an American politician in the state of Iowa.

Nolting was born near Frederika, Iowa. He attended East Waterloo High School and was a meat cutter. He served in the Iowa State Senate from 1975 to 1979, and House of Representatives from 1969 to 1971 as a Democrat.
