= Clifford Burroughs =

American politician (1917–1999)

Member of the Iowa Senate from the 19th district
- In office November 20, 1973 – January 7, 1979
- Preceded by: Vernon Kyhl
- Succeeded by: John W. Jensen

Personal details
- Born: Clifford Earl Burroughs; January 28, 1917 Near Clarksville, Iowa
- Died: June 11, 1999 (aged 82)
- Party: Republican

Clifford Earl Burroughs (January 28, 1917 – June 11, 1999) was an American politician.

Burroughs was born on January 28, 1917, to parents Alfred and Effie Mae Burroughs, on the family farm near Clarksville, Iowa. He was educated in country schools and Greene High School. After graduating in 1935, Burroughs took short courses in business administration, aircraft mechanics, supervisor training and civil defense monitoring. He started working for John Deere in Waterloo in 1937. Five years later, Burroughs joined the Iowa Transmission Company as an assembler of tank transmissions. He subsequently moved to Arizona, and was employed as an aircraft mechanic at Luke Field and then at Yuma Army Air Base. Burroughs himself was drafted into the United States Army in 1945. After leaving military service, Burroughs sold securities at an investment firm until 1974.

Burroughs married Mary Virginia Pooley on June 29, 1940. The couple moved to Greene, Iowa, in 1947. Burroughs, a Republican, served as mayor of Greene between 1948 and 1949. Burroughs won a special election following the death of Vernon Kyhl, and assumed the District 19 seat in the Iowa Senate on November 20, 1973. Burroughs won a full four-year term in his own right in 1974, and stepped down from the state senate on January 7, 1979. He died on June 11, 1999, aged 82.
