= Warren Curtis =

American politician (1914–1998)

Member of the Iowa Senate from the 3rd district
- In office January 8, 1973 – January 7, 1979
- Preceded by: Wayne D. Keith
- Succeeded by: Arne Waldstein

Member of the Iowa House of Representatives from the 25th district
- In office January 11, 1971 – January 7, 1973
- Succeeded by: John E. Patchett

Personal details
- Born: Warren E. Curtis; January 19, 1914 Doon, Iowa, U.S.
- Died: May 31, 1998 (aged 84)
- Party: Republican
- Spouse: Emily Ericksen (m. 1935)
- Children: 2
- Education: University of Iowa (BS)
- Occupation: Politician

Military service
- Allegiance: United States
- Branch/service: United States Navy
- Years of service: 1943–1947
- Battles/wars: World War II

Warren E. Curtis (January 19, 1914 – May 31, 1998) was an American politician from Iowa.

== Life and career ==
Warren E. Curtis was born in Doon, Iowa, on January 19, 1914, to parents William and Nora Curtis. He attended grade school in Sheldon before graduating from Holstein High School in 1931. Curtis then earned a bachelor of science degree from the University of Iowa in 1936. He qualified as a Certified Public Accountant in 1941, and was active in the American Institute of Certified Public Accountants. Between 1943 and 1947, during World War II, Curtis served in the United States Navy. Following the end of his military service, Curtis settled in the city of Cherokee with his wife Emily Ericksen, a Holstein native he had married in 1935. The couple raised two children, a son and a daughter. While residing in Cherokee, Curtis served on the Cherokee Library Board for six years, was a member of the Rotary Club, and was a member and president of the Cherokee Chamber of Commerce.

Curtis served on the Cherokee city council for five years prior to his election to the state legislature. In November 1970, he was elected to the Iowa House of Representatives, and was seated from the 25th district. Curtis sought the 3rd district seat in the Iowa Senate during the next election cycle, and won. He served three consecutive terms in the upper house of the state legislature, until 1979. During his political career, Curtis was affiliated with the Republican Party.

Curtis died aged 84, on May 31, 1998.
