= Norman Rodgers =

American politician (1927–2023)

Member of the Iowa State Senate
- In office 1973–1987

Member of the Iowa House of Representatives
- In office 1969–1973

Personal details
- Born: September 21, 1927 Chatfield, Minnesota, U.S.
- Died: August 30, 2023 (aged 95)
- Party: Democratic
- Education: American Institute of Business
- Occupation: farmer, grocer

Norman George Rodgers (September 21, 1927 – August 30, 2023) was an American politician in the state of Iowa.

== Life and career ==
Norman George Rodgers was born in Chatfield, Minnesota on September 21, 1927. Graduating from high school in 1944, he is a farmer and former grocer. He served in the Iowa State Senate from 1973 to 1987, and House of Representatives from 1969 to 1973, as a Democrat. Rodgers died on August 30, 2023, at the age of 95.
