= Harry Nielsen (politician) =

American politician

Harry Nielsen (3 May 1895 – 8 August 1981) was an American politician. Nielsen was born in Pottawattamie County, Iowa, on 3 May 1895. His family moved to Blencoe during his preadolescent years. Nielsen graduated from Little Sioux High School and became a farmer. He was affiliated with the Democratic Party and had served as Sherman Township trustee and president of the Blencoe school board before being elected to the Iowa House of Representatives. Nielsen held the District 57 seat for two terms, from 1949 to 1953. After stepping down from the state house, Nielsen remained active in politics as mayor of Blencoe.

Nielsen married Irene Miller Perry on 22 July 1922. The couple raised five children. She died on 8 May 1971. Harry Nielsen died on 8 August 1981 at Burgess Memorial Hospital in Onawa.
