= Dale Tieden =

American politician

Dale L. Tieden (11 October 1922 – 3 November 1994) was an American politician.

He was born to parents Lewis and Grace née Fisher. He graduated from Elkader High School and Elkader Junior College, then enrolled at the University of Iowa. After one year of university, Tieden returned to the family farm in Elkader, held by his ancestors for over a century. The land remained a farm until 1959, when Tieden began focusing on feed and livestock.

Tiden won his first legislative election in 1964, as a Republican candidate for the 70th district of the Iowa House of Representatives. He served three terms, a total of six years, as a state representative for the 70th district, and one term for the 14th district. In 1972, Tieden was elected to the Iowa Senate for the first time as the legislator for District 9. He held the seat until 1983, after which he represented District 16. Tieden remained a state senator until 1993.
