= Earl Willits =

American politician

Member of the Iowa Senate from the 31st district
- In office January 8, 1973 – July 30, 1979
- Preceded by: George Milligan
- Succeeded by: Gary L. Baugher

Member of the Iowa House of Representatives from the 57th district
- In office January 11, 1971 – January 7, 1973
- Preceded by: Jewell Waugh
- Succeeded by: Andrew Varley

Personal details
- Born: October 30, 1946 Marshalltown, Iowa
- Died: July 11, 1990 (aged 43) Des Moines, Iowa
- Party: Democratic

Earl M. Willits (October 30, 1946 – July 11, 1990) was an American politician who served in the Iowa House of Representatives from the 57th district from 1971 to 1973 and in the Iowa Senate from the 31st district from 1973 to 1979.

Willits graduated from Union-Whitten High School, earned an undergraduate degree from Iowa State University in 1968. He earned the Cardinal's Key for academic excellence. In 1970, he was elected to the Iowa House of Representatives. In 1972, he was elected to the Iowa Senate. He earned a Juris Doctor degree from Drake University Law School in 1974.

In 1979, he resigned from the Senate to work in the farm division of the Attorney General Office, but later became the First Assistant Attorney General.

Earl married Martha Oldson of Eagle Grove in 1969 and they had of two daughters. They were divorced in 1986. He died of AIDS on July 11, 1990, in Des Moines, Iowa at age 43.
