= Calvin Hultman =

American politician

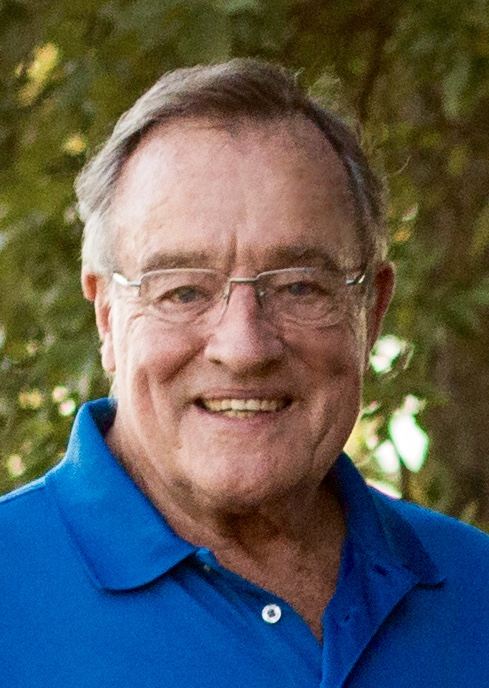

Member of the Iowa Senate from the 49th district
- In office January 8, 1973 – January 9, 1983
- Preceded by: Gene W. Glenn
- Succeeded by: Jack W. Hester

Member of the Iowa Senate from the 47th district
- In office January 10, 1983 – January 13, 1991
- Preceded by: Richard Ramsey
- Succeeded by: Derryl McLaren

Personal details
- Born: Calvin Oscar Hultman; May 24, 1941 Omaha, Nebraska, U.S.
- Died: October 19, 2017 (aged 76) McKinney, Texas, U.S.
- Party: Republican
- Spouse: Mary Ellan
- Children: Calvin Oscar II, Daniel Andrew Oscar, Christopher Oscar James
- Parent: Oscar Hultman (father)
- Education: Iowa State University
- Occupation: Businessman, lobbyist

Calvin Oscar Hultman (May 24, 1941 – October 19, 2017) was an American politician in the state of Iowa.

Hultman was born in Omaha, Nebraska and attended Iowa State University and Dana College. He lived in Stanton, Iowa (1941–1971), Red Oak, Iowa (1971–1991), Des Moines, Iowa (1991–2014) and McKinney, Texas until the time of his death. He spent his summers in Moose, Wyoming and later had a summer home in Dubois, Wyoming. Hultman was in the retail and lumber business, as well as realty, and became a lobbyist after he retired from the state Senate. Hultman served in the Iowa Senate from 1973 to 1991, as a Republican. He died of cancer in McKinney, Texas in 2017.
