= Terry Branstad =

American politician (born 1946)

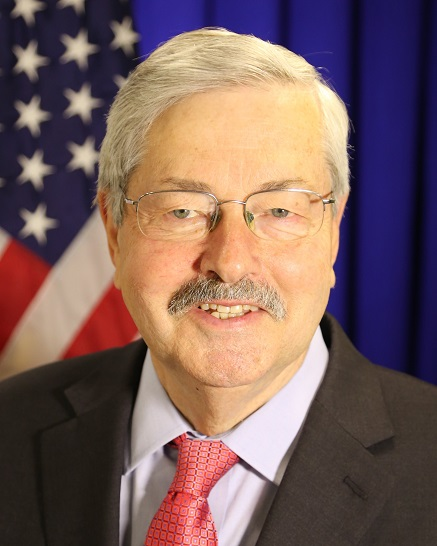
- Official portrait, 2017

12th United States Ambassador to China
- In office July 12, 2017 – October 4, 2020
- President: Donald Trump
- Preceded by: Max Baucus
- Succeeded by: R. Nicholas Burns

39th and 42nd Governor of Iowa
- In office January 14, 2011 – May 24, 2017
- Lieutenant: Kim Reynolds
- Preceded by: Chet Culver
- Succeeded by: Kim Reynolds
- In office January 14, 1983 – January 15, 1999
- Lieutenant: Robert Anderson; Jo Ann Zimmerman; Joy Corning
- Preceded by: Robert Ray
- Succeeded by: Tom Vilsack

President of Des Moines University
- In office August 9, 2003 – October 16, 2009
- Preceded by: Richard Ryan
- Succeeded by: Steve Dengle

Chair of the National Governors Association
- In office August 1, 1989 – July 31, 1990
- Preceded by: Gerald Baliles
- Succeeded by: Booth Gardner

40th Lieutenant Governor of Iowa
- In office January 12, 1979 – January 14, 1983
- Governor: Robert D. Ray
- Preceded by: Arthur A. Neu
- Succeeded by: Robert Anderson

Member of the Iowa House of Representatives from the 8th district
- In office January 8, 1973 – January 7, 1979
- Preceded by: Del Stromer
- Succeeded by: Clifford Branstad

Personal details
- Born: Terry Edward Branstad; November 17, 1946 (age 80) Leland, Iowa, U.S.
- Party: Republican
- Spouse: Christine Johnson (m. 1972)
- Children: 3, including Eric
- Education: University of Iowa (BA); Drake University (JD)

Military service
- Allegiance: United States
- Branch/service: United States Army
- Years of service: 1969–1971
- Unit: 503rd Military Police Battalion
- Awards: Army Commendation Medal

Terry Edward Branstad (born November 17, 1946) is a retired American politician and U.S. Army veteran who served as the 39th and 42nd governor of Iowa (1983–1999; 2011–2017) and the United States ambassador to China (2017–2020). A member of the Republican Party, Branstad is the longest-serving governor in United States history, with a total gubernatorial tenure of 22 years, 4 months, and 13 days.

Branstad served three terms in the Iowa House of Representatives and one term as the 40th lieutenant governor of Iowa before he was elected governor in 1982. At age 36, he was the youngest governor in Iowa history upon taking office. After 16 years as governor, he served as president of Des Moines University, a private medical osteopathic school, from 2003 to 2009. In 2010, Branstad returned to Iowa politics, running for governor again and defeating Democratic incumbent Chet Culver to become the state's 42nd governor.

In December 2016, president-elect Donald Trump nominated Branstad to serve as the United States Ambassador to China. Branstad resigned as governor of Iowa on May 24, 2017, and was sworn in as the United States ambassador to China on July 12, 2017. In 2020, Branstad resigned from his post to work on Trump's 2020 presidential campaign. Branstad retired from public life in 2025.

== Early life ==
Branstad was born in Leland, Iowa, on November 17, 1946. His father was Edward Arnold Branstad, a farmer; his mother was Rita (née Garland). Branstad's mother was Jewish, and his father was a Norwegian American Lutheran. Branstad was raised Lutheran and later converted to Catholicism.

== Education ==
Branstad received a Bachelor of Arts in political science from the University of Iowa in 1969 and a Juris Doctor from Drake University Law School in 1974. He was drafted after college and served in the United States Army from 1969 to 1971 as a military policeman in the 503rd Military Police Battalion at Fort Bragg. He was awarded the Army Commendation Medal for meritorious service; he once recalled that he arrested actress Jane Fonda for coming onto the post at Arlington National Cemetery, where she was planning to attend an antiwar protest.

== Early political career ==
Branstad served three terms in the Iowa House of Representatives from 1973 to 1979 and was the Lieutenant Governor of Iowa from 1979 to 1983, the year he was first elected governor.

== Governor of Iowa ==
=== First tenure (1983–1999) ===
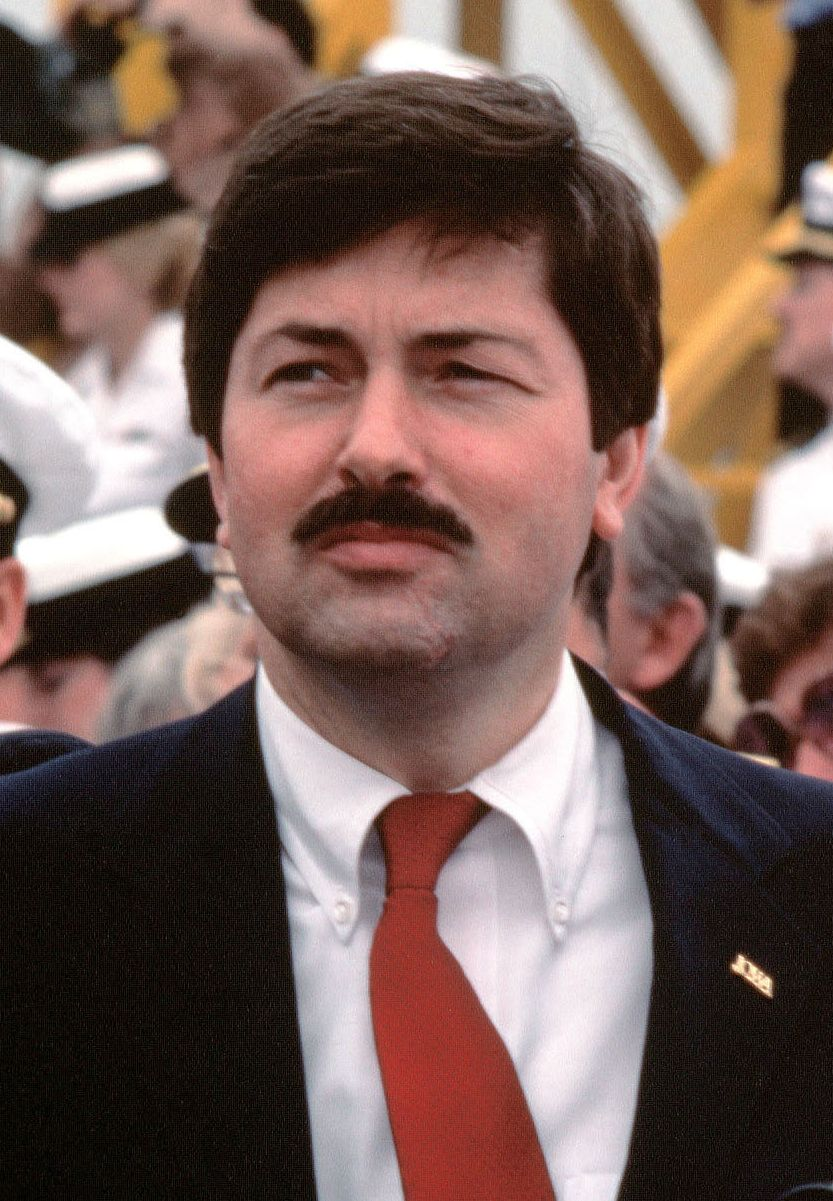
Branstad attending the recommissioning ceremony for the USS Iowa, April 28, 1984

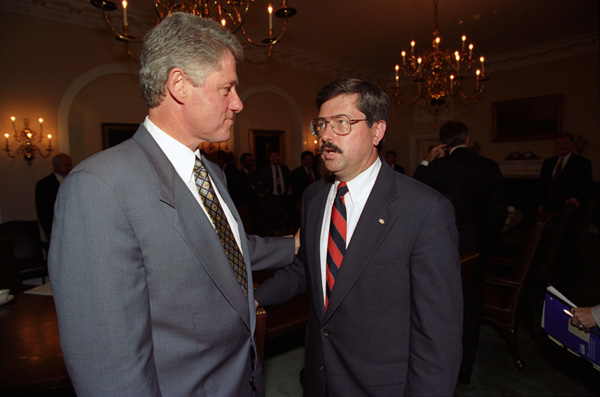
Branstad with President Bill Clinton in 1993

When he took office as governor at age 36, Branstad became the youngest chief executive in Iowa's history. Reelected in 1986, 1990, and 1994, he left office as Iowa's longest-serving governor. He served as Chairman of the National Governors Association in 1989–1990, and also was Chair of the Midwestern Governors Association. In 1997 he chaired the Education Commission of the States, the Republican Governors Association, and the Governors' Ethanol Coalition.

In 1983 Branstad vetoed a bill to establish a state lottery.

Branstad made reinstatement of the death penalty a central focus of his 1994 re-election campaign; however, despite successfully being re-elected, he was unable to implement this policy due to opposition from Democrats in the Iowa State Senate.

Iowa's unemployment rate went from 8.5% when Branstad took office to a record low 2.5% by the time he left office in 1999. In his first year as governor, the state budget had a $90 million deficit. It took several years until the budget was balanced. Branstad said he did not have enough support in the legislature to approve budget reforms until 1992. By 1999 Iowa had an unprecedented $900 million budget surplus.

=== Inter-gubernatorial career ===
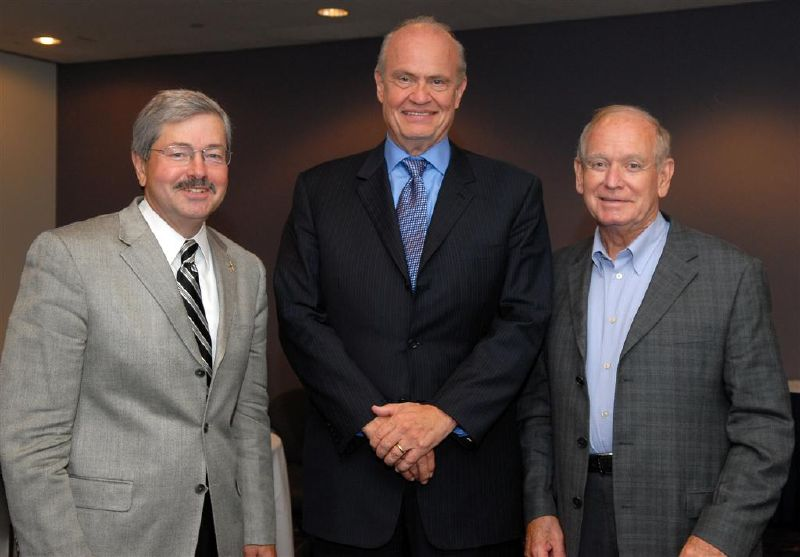
Branstad (left) with Fred Thompson and Robert D. Ray in 2007

Branstad focused most of his efforts outside of politics after leaving office in early 1999. He founded Branstad and Associates, LLC and was also a partner in the firm of Kaufman, Pattee, Branstad & Miller and a financial advisor for Robert W. Baird and Co.

In August 2003 Branstad accepted an offer from Des Moines University to become its president. On October 16, 2009, he announced his retirement from Des Moines University to run again for governor.

President George W. Bush appointed Branstad to chair the President's Commission on Excellence in Special Education. The commission was charged with developing a plan to improve the educational performance of students with disabilities. After completing his work with the commission in 2003, Branstad was asked to serve as a member of the National Advisory Council for Positive Action for Teen Health, or PATH. The advisory council encourages action to detect adolescent mental illness. In April 2003 Branstad was named a public member of the American Institute of Certified Public Accountants, which comprises both professional and public members who address a variety of issues related to accounting.

Branstad serves on the boards of Conmed Health Management Inc, American Future Fund, the Iowa Health System, Liberty Bank, the American Institute of Certified Public Accountants, and Living History Farms.

=== Second tenure (2011–2017) ===
Branstad surpassed George Clinton's record as longest serving governor of the United States of 20 years, and 11 months, and 2 days on 14 December 2015.

==== 2010 gubernatorial election ====
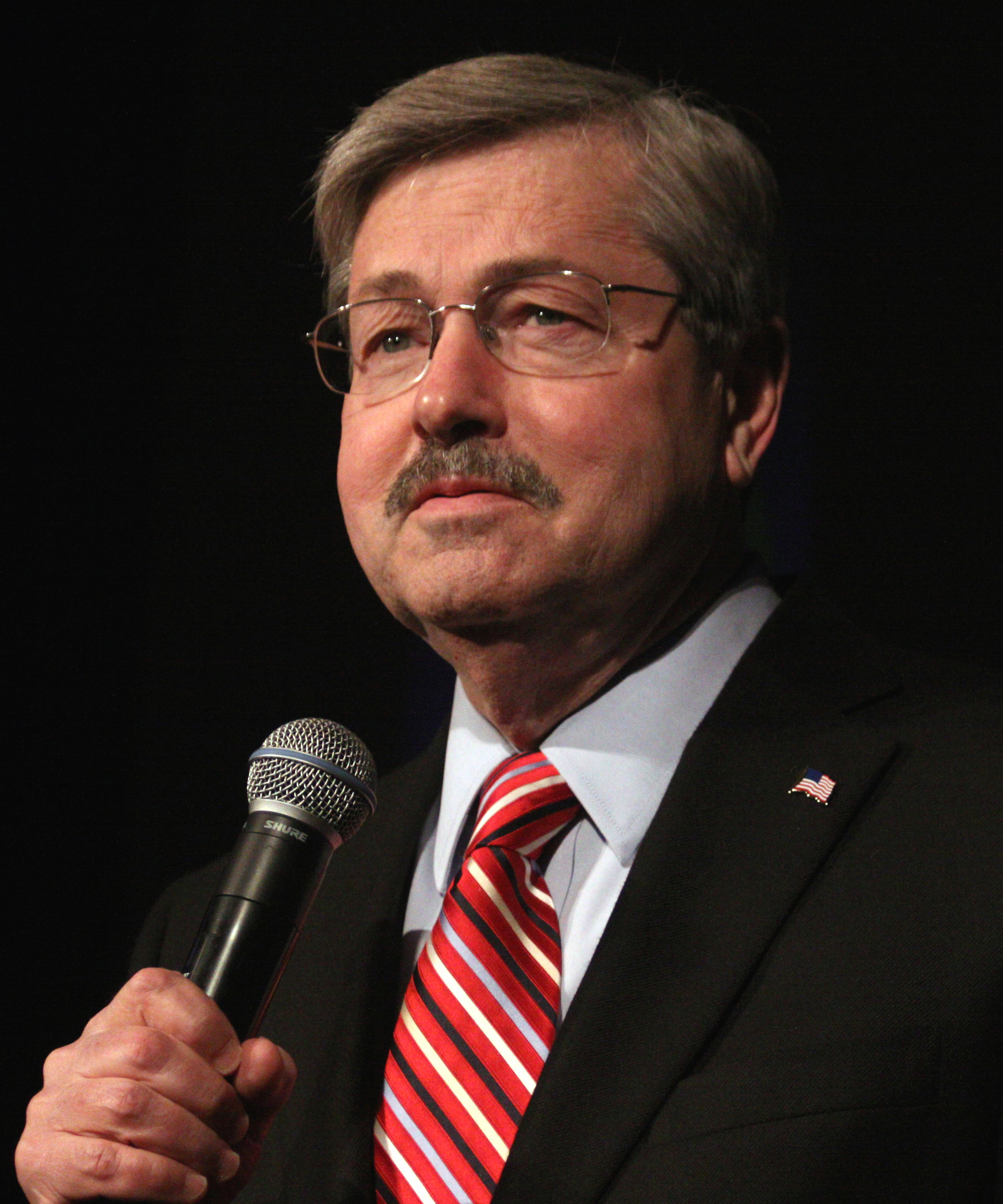
Branstad in 2011

On August 2, 2009, The Des Moines Register reported that Branstad was actively considering seeking the Republican nomination for governor. On October 7, Branstad filed papers to run for governor in the 2010 election. According to a September Des Moines Register poll, he maintained a 70% favorability rating from Iowans as compared to Governor Chet Culver's rating of 50%.

On June 8, 2010, Branstad won the Republican gubernatorial nomination, but when opposing candidate Bob Vander Plaats conceded, he did not endorse Branstad.

The Des Moines Tea Party gave Branstad a "no" on their report card regarding "criteria for acceptance" and said Branstad had "a history of raising taxes, [was] not a true conservative, increased the size of government every year he held office, [and] built a state-owned phone company." Former Iowa State Auditor Richard Johnson accused Branstad of keeping "two sets of books" on the state budget while governor. Johnson said Branstad needed to be "transparent" to Iowa voters about the reporting of Iowa's finances during his tenure as governor.

==== 2014 gubernatorial election ====
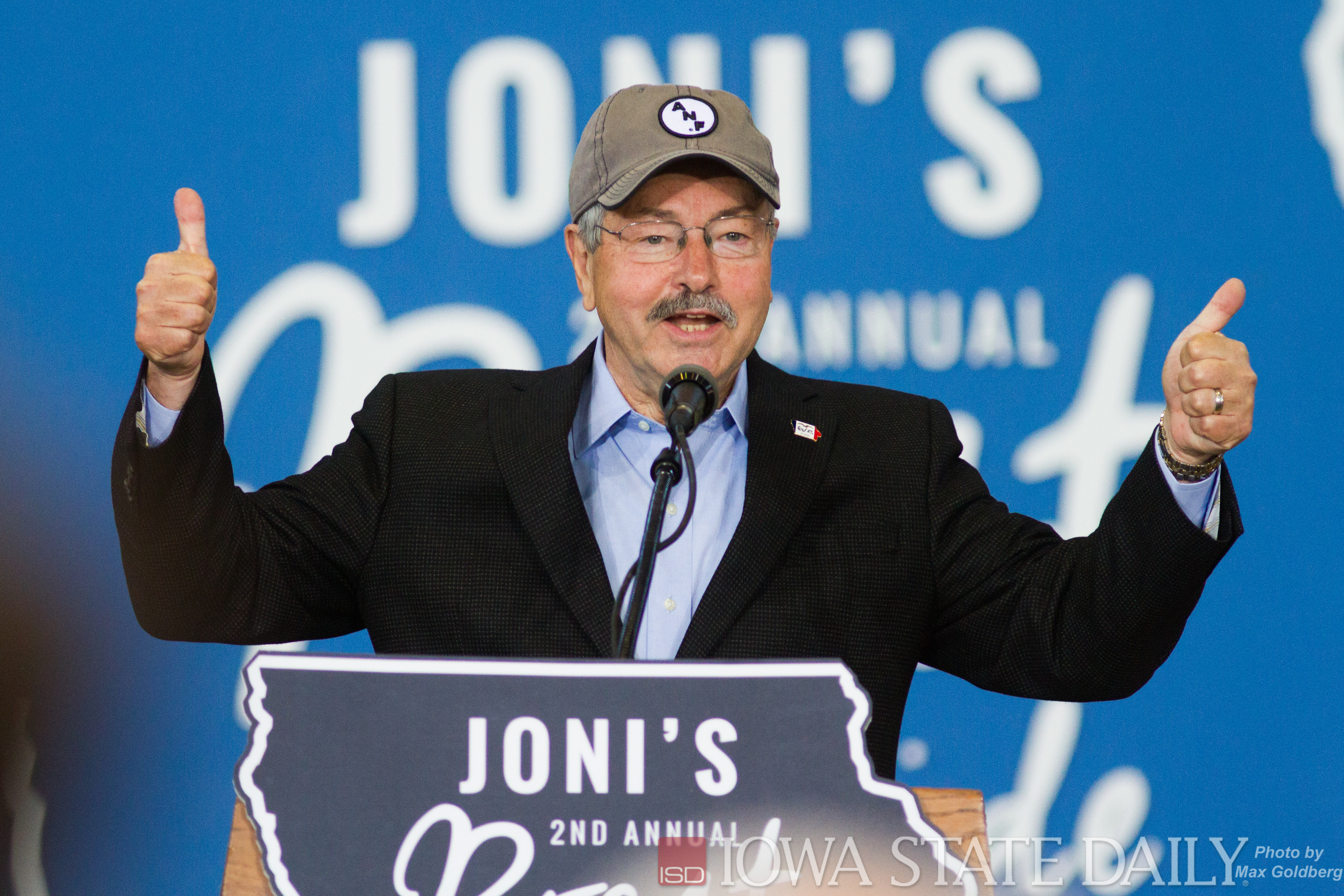
Branstad speaking at the 2016 Roast and Ride, hosted by U.S. Senator Joni Ernst

Branstad ran for reelection in 2014. He was opposed in the Republican primary by Tom Hoefling, a political activist and nominee for president in 2012 for both America's Party and American Independent Party. Branstad won the primary with 83% of the vote.

In the general election, Branstad faced Democratic nominee State Senator Jack Hatch and won with 59% of the vote.

==== Voting rights ====
Branstad rescinded an executive order signed by governor Tom Vilsack that restored voting rights to approximately 115,000 felons who had completed their sentences. Iowa was the last remaining state to have felons permanently disenfranchised until 2020, when Branstad's successor, Kim Reynolds, restored voting rights for some felons who had completed their sentences.

==== Taxes ====
In June 2013, Branstad signed into law a sweeping tax reform bill that had widespread bipartisan support, passing the Iowa Senate by 44 votes to 6 and the Iowa House by 84 votes to 13. The bill, Senate File 295, provided for the state's largest tax cut in history, including an estimated $4.4 billion in property tax reform and an estimated $90 million of annual income tax relief, in part in the form of an increase in the earned income tax credit. The bill also included significant reforms to education and health care.

==== Job creation ranking ====
A June 2013 Business Journals analysis of 45 of the country's 50 governors ranked Branstad 28th in job creation. The ranking was based on a comparison of the annual private sector growth rate in all 50 states using data from the U.S. Bureau of Labor Statistics.

==== Gun rights ====
On April 13, 2017, with large Republican majorities in the Iowa legislature, Branstad signed a bill into law expanding gun rights, enacting a stand-your-ground law, expanding the right of citizens to sue if they believe their Second Amendment rights are being infringed, and expanding the gun rights of minors, among several other provisions.

==== Bakken pipeline ====
Branstad's business-friendly appointments to the Iowa Utilities Board were controversial. They have "virtually assured" approval of the Iowa section of the Dakota Access pipeline. His last appointment was that of Richard W. Lozier Jr., who represented a pro-pipeline lobby group and who had to recuse himself one month after he joined in 2017.

==== Discrimination lawsuit ====
On July 15, 2019, a jury in Polk County, Iowa awarded a gay former state official $1.5 million in damages, finding that Branstad had discriminated against him based on sexual orientation in 2012.

== U.S. Ambassador to China ==
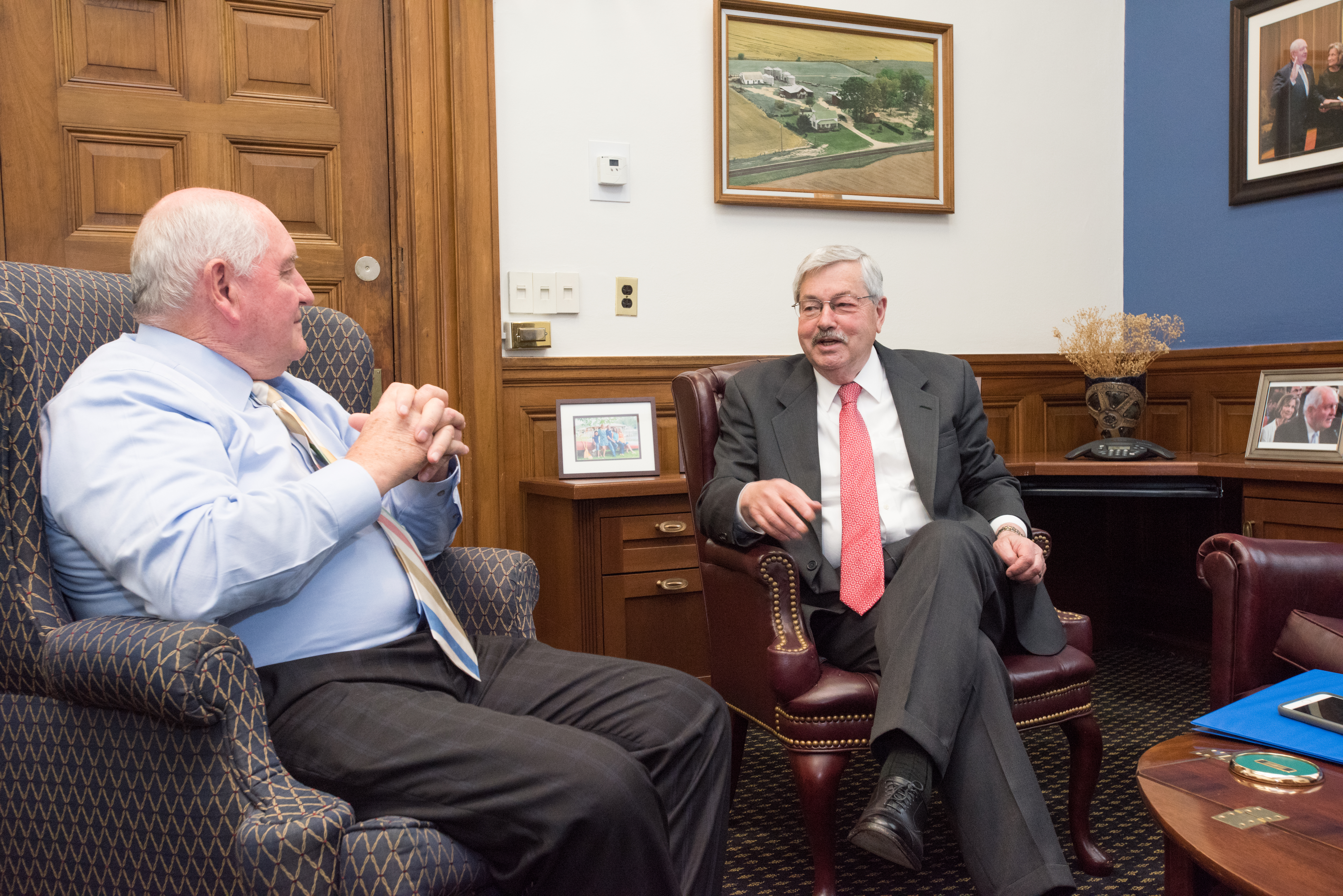
Branstad meeting with U.S. Secretary of Agriculture Sonny Perdue, May 30, 2017

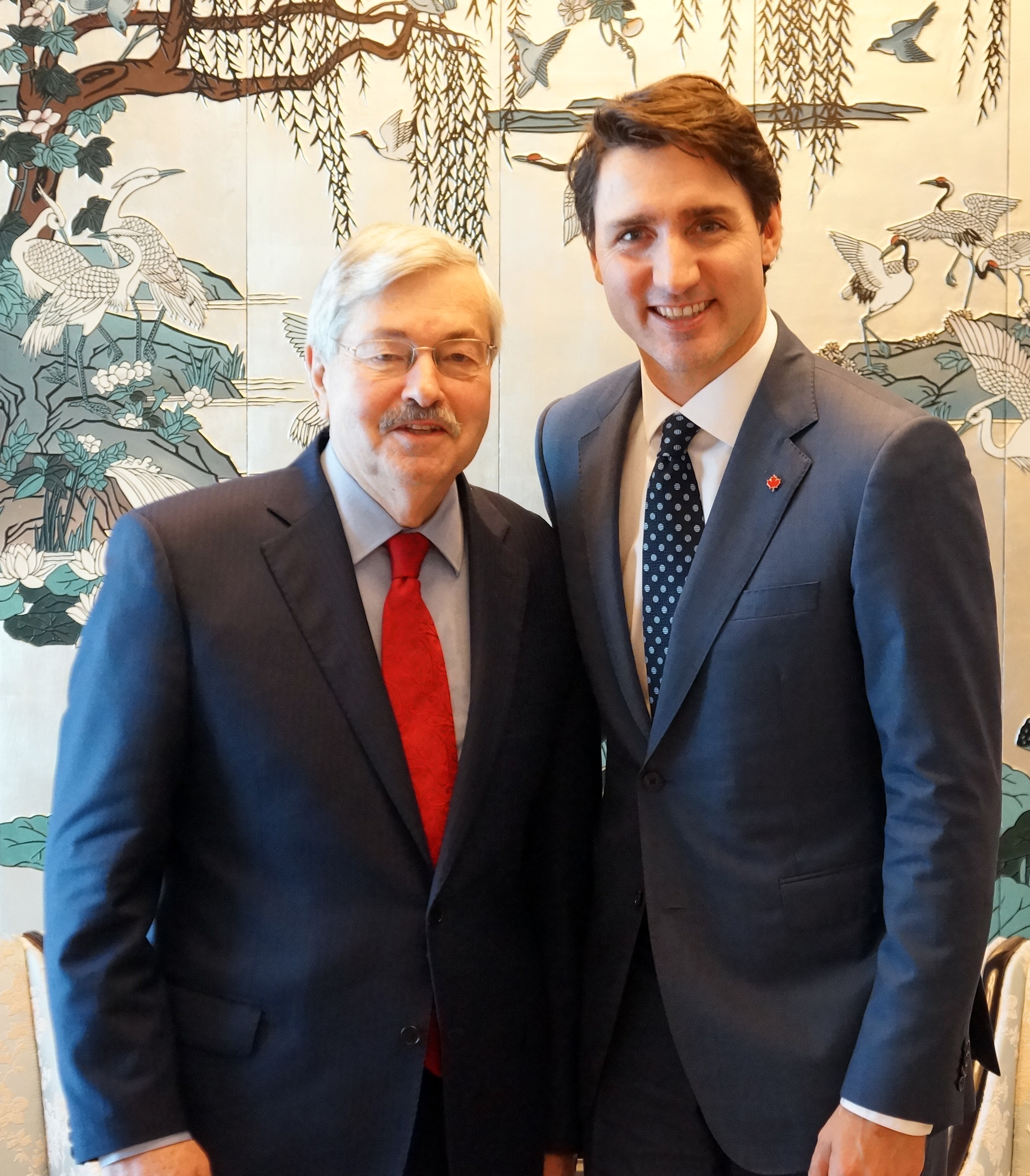
Terry Branstad with Prime Minister of Canada Justin Trudeau, 2017

In December 2016 President-elect Donald Trump chose Branstad to serve as US Ambassador to China, succeeding Max Baucus. Branstad accepted the offer within one day after meeting with Trump in New York. Trump cited Branstad's decades of experience with China while governor of Iowa. Xi Jinping, China's paramount leader, considers Branstad an "old friend". Branstad's relationship with Xi dates to 1985, when Xi, then a young official from Hebei Province, headed a five-man agricultural delegation to Iowa. Branstad's hearing before the U.S. Senate Foreign Relations Committee was held on May 2, 2017.

Branstad was confirmed by the Senate on May 22, 2017, in an 82 to 13 vote. He resigned as governor on May 24, 2017, in a ceremony at the Iowa State House, and was immediately sworn in as U.S. Ambassador to China. His appointment marked the third time in a decade that a politician resigned a statewide office to become the Ambassador to China; Jon Huntsman Jr. resigned as governor of Utah in 2009, and Max Baucus resigned as U.S. senator from Montana in 2014.

In October 2018, the Financial Times reported that Branstad opposed a proposal by White House Senior Advisor Stephen Miller to halt the issuance of student visas to Chinese nationals, making it impossible for Chinese citizens to study in the United States. Branstad argued that such a ban would harm US trade to China and hurt small American universities more than the elite ones.

In May 2019, Branstad traveled to Tibet Autonomous Region amid heightening trade tensions between the United States and China. This diplomatic journey was designed to give the United States a better perception of Tibet and its people, cultural practices, and life.

Branstad resigned as U.S. Ambassador to China in early October 2020, at the request of President Trump to help with his 2020 presidential campaign.

== World Food Prize ==
On January 24, 2023, it was announced that Branstad would become president of the World Food Prize Foundation.

Branstad announced his retirement on November 19, 2024, and formally retired in February 2025.

== Personal life ==
Branstad married Christine Johnson on June 17, 1972. They have three children, Eric, Allison, and Marcus, and eight grandchildren. His wife has worked as a medical assistant and as a volunteer at schools and hospitals. Eric Branstad is a political consultant and lobbyist whose lobbying activities on behalf of Chinese firms while Branstad was US Ambassador to China led to charges with conflict of interest. Branstad denied the allegation. Allison moved to Beijing with her father when he was appointed ambassador because she landed a job at the International School of Beijing as a third grade teacher. Marcus was appointed by his father to the Iowa Natural Resources Commission in 2013 and works as a lobbyist for the American Chemistry Council.

Branstad is a member of the Ancient and Accepted Scottish Rite of Freemasonry. He received the honor of "Knight Commander of the Court of Honor" in 2015.

In 2015, longtime newspaperman and Iowa historian Mike Chapman published a biography of Branstad, Iowa's Record-Setting Governor: The Terry Branstad Story. The book details Branstad's youth on the family farm, his high school days in Forest City, and his rise in politics.

Branstad is a second cousin of Merrick Garland, who served as United States attorney general under President Joe Biden. (Note: Branstad's maternal grandfather was Louis Edward Garland, whose brother Max Hyman (later "Harry") Garland is the grandfather of Merrick Garland. Max and Louis were born in Vagova, Lithuania, then part of the Pale of Settlement within the Russian Empire; they immigrated to the United States together, arriving in New York City on December 7, 1907 and listing their race as "Hebrew". The Garland brothers then settled in Council Bluffs, Iowa.)

== Electoral history ==
- 1972 election for Iowa House of Representatives District 8:
  - Terry Branstad (R), 59.0%
  - Elmer Selbrand (D), 41.0%
- 1974 election for Iowa House of Representatives District 8:
  - Terry Branstad (R), 68.7%
  - Jean Haugland (D), 31.3%
- 1976 election for Iowa House of Representatives District 8:
  - Terry Branstad (R), 70.4%
  - Franklin Banwart (D), 29.6%
- 1978 Republican primary election for Lieutenant Governor of Iowa:
  - Terry Branstad, 42.1%
  - Hansen, 32.7%
  - Oakley, 25.2%
- 1978 election for Lieutenant Governor of Iowa:
  - Terry Branstad (R), 57.7%
  - William Palmer (D), 42.3%

Iowa gubernatorial election, 1982
Party	Candidate	Votes	%	±%
Republican	Terry Branstad	548,313	52.81%	−5.51%
Democratic	Roxanne Conlin	483,291	46.55%	+5.57%
Libertarian	Marcia Farrington	3,307	0.32%	−0.15%
Socialist	Jim Bittner	2,767	0.27%	+0.04%
Write-ins		551	0.05%	
Majority		65,022	6.26%	
Turnout		1,038,229		
Republican hold		Swing		

Iowa gubernatorial election, 1986
Party	Candidate	Votes	%	±%
Republican	Terry Branstad (incumbent)	472,712	51.91%	−0.90%
Democratic	Lowell Junkins	436,987	47.99%	−1.44%
Write-ins		924	0.10%	
Majority		35,725	3.92%	
Turnout		910,623		
Republican hold		Swing		

Iowa gubernatorial election, 1990
Party	Candidate	Votes	%	±%
Republican	Terry Branstad (inc.)	591,852	60.61%	+8.70%
Democratic	Donald Avenson	379,372	38.85%	−9.14%
Socialist Workers	Nan Bailey	4,263	0.44%	
Write-ins		996	0.10%	
Turnout		976,483		
Republican hold		Swing		

Iowa Gubernatorial Republican primary results, 1994
Party	Candidate	Votes	%
Republican	Terry Branstad (inc.)	161,228	51.80
Republican	Fred Grandy	149,809	48.13
Write-in		240	0.08
Total votes		311,277	100.00

Iowa gubernatorial election general results, 1994
Party	Candidate	Votes	%	±%
Republican	Terry Branstad (inc.)	566,395	56.80%	−3.81%
Democratic	Bonnie Campbell	414,453	41.56%	+2.71%
Independent	Richard O'Dell Hughes	5,505	0.55%	
Natural Law	Veronica Bells Butler	3,737	0.37%	
Libertarian	Carl Eric Olsen	2,772	0.28%	
Socialist Workers	Michael Galati	770	0.08%	−0.36%
Write-ins		3,616	0.36%	
Majority		151,942	15.24%	−6.52%
Turnout		997,248		
Republican hold		Swing		

Iowa Gubernatorial Republican primary results, 2010
Party	Candidate	Votes	%
Republican	Terry Branstad	114,450	50.30
Republican	Bob Vander Plaats	93,058	40.90
Republican	Rod Roberts	19,896	8.74
Republican	Write-ins	121	0.05
Total votes		227,525	100

Iowa gubernatorial election general results, 2010
Party	Candidate	Votes	%	±%
Republican	Terry Branstad	592,494	52.81%	+8.43%
Democratic	Chet Culver (incumbent)	484,798	43.21%	−10.81%
Iowa Party	Jonathan Narcisse	20,859	1.86%	n/a
Libertarian	Eric Cooper	14,398	1.28%	+0.74%
Independent	Gregory Hughes	3,884	0.35%	n/a
Socialist Workers	David Rosenfeld	2,757	0.25%	+0.06%
Write-in		2,823	0.25%	n/a
Total votes		1,122,013	100.00%	n/a
Republican gain from Democratic				

Iowa Gubernatorial Republican primary results, 2014
Party	Candidate	Votes	%
Republican	Terry Branstad (incumbent)	129,712	83.00
Republican	Tom Hoefling	26,284	16.82
Republican	Write-In	279	0.18
Total votes		156,275	100

Iowa gubernatorial election general results, 2014
Party	Candidate	Votes	%	±%
Republican	Terry Branstad (incumbent) / Kim Reynolds (incumbent)	666,032	58.99%	+6.18%
Democratic	Jack Hatch / Monica Vernon	420,787	37.27%	−5.94%
Libertarian	Lee Deakins Hieb / Tim Watson	20,321	1.80%	+0.52%
Independent	Jim Hennager / Mary Margaret Krieg	10,582	0.94%	N/A
Iowa	Jonathan R. Narcisse / Michael L. Richards	10,240	0.91%	−0.95%
n/a	Write-ins	1,095	0.09%	n/a
Total votes		1,129,057	100.00%	n/a
Republican hold				

== Notes ==
Party political offices
Preceded by Arthur Neu	Republican nominee for Lieutenant Governor of Iowa; 1978	Succeeded by Lawrence Pope
Preceded by Robert Ray	Republican nominee for Governor of Iowa; 1982, 1986, 1990, 1994	Succeeded by Jim Lightfoot
Preceded by John Engler	Chair of the Republican Governors Association; 1996–1997	Succeeded by David Beasley
Preceded by Jim Nussle	Republican nominee for Governor of Iowa; 2010, 2014	Succeeded by Kim Reynolds
Political offices
Preceded by Arthur Neu	Lieutenant Governor of Iowa; 1979–1983	Succeeded by Robert Anderson
Preceded by Robert D. Ray	Governor of Iowa; 1983–1999	Succeeded by Tom Vilsack
Preceded by Gerald Baliles	Chair of the National Governors Association; 1989–1990	Succeeded by Booth Gardner
Preceded by Chet Culver	Governor of Iowa; 2011–2017	Succeeded by Kim Reynolds
Academic offices
Preceded by Richard Ryan	President of Des Moines University; 2003–2009	Succeeded by Steve Dengle
Diplomatic posts
Preceded by Max Baucus	United States Ambassador to China; 2017–2020	Succeeded by R. Nicholas Burns
U.S. order of precedence (ceremonial)
Preceded by Martha McSally as Former U.S. Senator	Order of precedence of the United States; Within Iowa	Succeeded by Chet Culver as Former Governor
Preceded by Charlie Crist as Former Governor	Order of precedence of the United States; Outside Iowa	Succeeded by Chet Culver as Former Governor
