= Joy Corning =

American politician (1932-2017)

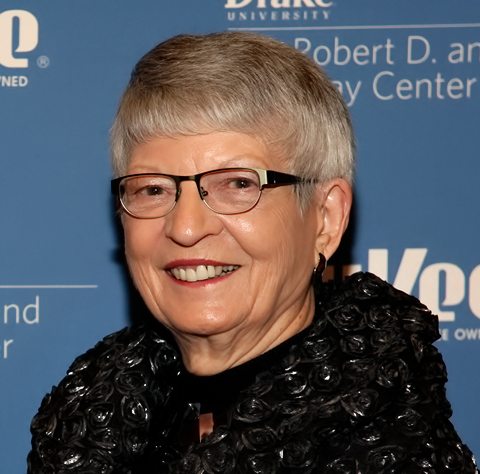
- Corning in 2015

43rd Lieutenant Governor of Iowa
- In office January 18, 1991 – January 15, 1999
- Governor: Terry Branstad
- Preceded by: Jo Ann Zimmerman
- Succeeded by: Sally Pederson

36th Chair of the National Lieutenant Governors Association
- In office 1995–1996
- Preceded by: Melinda Schwegmann
- Succeeded by: Kim Robak

Member of the Iowa Senate
- In office January 14, 1985 – January 13, 1991
- Constituency: 12th District

Personal details
- Born: Joy Cole; September 7, 1932 Bridgewater, Iowa, U.S.
- Died: May 20, 2017 (aged 84) Des Moines, Iowa, U.S.
- Party: Republican
- Spouse: Burton Corning (m. 1955; died 1990)
- Children: 3
- Profession: Educator

Joy Corning (née Cole; September 7, 1932 – May 20, 2017) was an American politician who served as the 43rd Lieutenant Governor of Iowa from 1991 to 1999. She was a member of the Republican Party.

== Early life ==
Corning was born in 1932, the only daughter of three children born to Perry Aaron Cole and Ethel (née Sullivan) Cole, in Bridgewater. She graduated from Bridgewater Highschool in 1949. She attended and graduated from the University of Northern Iowa, with Bachelor's Degree in Elementary Education. She then became a teacher.

On June 19, 1955, she married Burton Corning in Bridgewater. They had three daughters and nine grandchildren.

== Early political career ==
Corning served as a state senator representing then Senate District 12 in Black Hawk County from 1985 to 1991. She also served as the president of the Cedar Falls School Board, and worked as the director of the Iowa Housing Finance Authority from 1981 to 1984.

== 1998 gubernatorial race ==
Corning entered the 1998 Republican gubernatorial primary, making history as the first woman to run for the Republican nomination to the office of governor in the state’s history. After an abbreviated gubernatorial campaign, she was forced to drop out due in large part to a lack of financial support. She subsequently became Governor Branstad's Lieutenant Governor from 1991 to 1999.

== Political positions ==
Corning has long been recognized as a leader among moderates and social liberals within the Republican Party. Corning was state Captain of the Republican Leadership Council.

A vocal proponent of abortion rights, Corning served on the Board of Directors for Iowa’s chapter of Planned Parenthood and even led that organization’s fundraising drive in 2002.

A proponent of gay rights, on May 12, 2009, Corning received the "Interfaith Award" along with the woman who followed her as Lt. Governor, Sally Pederson. The award was presented by the Interfaith Alliance of Iowa, and came after a joint letter to the editor of the Des Moines Register penned by the pair of former Lieutenant Governors promoting gay marriage.

== Death ==
Corning died May 20, 2017, from a liver condition.

She was awarded the 2017 Edward S. Allen Award by the ACLU of Iowa in August 2017.

== See also ==
- List of female lieutenant governors in the United States

Party political offices
Preceded by Joan Lipsky	Republican Party nominee for Lieutenant Governor of Iowa; 1990, 1994	Succeeded by Almo Hawkins
Political offices
Preceded by Jo Ann Zimmerman	Lieutenant Governor of Iowa; 1991–1999	Succeeded by Sally Pederson
