= Stephen W. Bisenius =

American politician

Member of the Iowa Senate from the 11th district
- In office January 10, 1977 – January 9, 1983
- Preceded by: Richard Norpel
- Succeeded by: John W. Jensen

Personal details
- Born: June 16, 1947 (age 79) Monticello, Iowa
- Party: Republican
- Parent(s): Edwin Bisenius; Louise S. Bisenius

Stephen W. Bisenius (born June 16, 1947) is an American Republican politician. He served as a member of the Iowa Senate from 1977 to 1983, representing Dubuque County.
