= List of elections in 1994 =

The following elections occurred in the year 1994.

== Africa ==
- 1994 Botswana general election
- 1994 Central African constitutional referendum
- 1994 Ethiopian Constituent Assembly election
- 1994 Guinea-Bissau general election
- 1994 Malawian general election
- 1994 Mozambican general election
- 1994 Namibian general election
- 1994 South African general election
- 1994 South African presidential election
- 1994 São Tomé and Príncipe legislative election
- 1994 Togolese parliamentary election
- 1994 Tunisian general election
- 1994 Ugandan Constituent Assembly election

== Asia ==
- 1994 Abkhazian presidential election
- 1994 Albanian constitutional referendum
- 1994 Kazakhstani legislative election
- 1994 Kazakh local elections
- 1994 Kyrgyz constitutional referendum
- 1994 Maldivian parliamentary election
- 1994 Nepalese legislative election
- 1994 Omani general election
- 1994 Sri Lankan parliamentary election
- 1994 Sri Lankan presidential election
- 1994 Syrian parliamentary election
- 1994 Taiwanese local elections
- 1994 Tajik presidential election
- 1994 Tajik constitutional referendum
- 1994 Turkish local elections
- 1994 Turkmen parliamentary election
- 1994-95 Uzbek parliamentary election

=== Malaysia ===
- 1994 Sabah state election

=== Turkey ===
- 1994 Turkish local elections

== Australia ==
- 1994 Bonython by-election
- 1994 Elizabeth state by-election
- 1994 Fremantle by-election
- 1994 Mackellar by-election
- 1994 Northern Territory general election
- 1994 Taylor state by-election
- 1994 Torrens state by-election
- 1994 Warringah by-election
- 1994 Werriwa by-election

== Europe ==
- 1994 Basque parliamentary election
- 1994 Belarusian presidential election
- 1994 Belgian local elections
- 1994 Bulgarian parliamentary election
- 1994 Crimean presidential election
- 1994 Czech municipal elections
- 1994 Danish parliamentary election
- 1994 Dutch general election
- 1994 European Parliament election
- 1994 Faroese parliamentary election
- 1994 Fianna Fáil leadership election
- 1994 Finnish presidential election
- 1994 Hungarian parliamentary election
- 1994 Irish local elections
- 1994 Italian general election
- 1994 Italian local elections
- 1994 Kazakhstani legislative election
- 1994 Macedonian general election
- 1994 Norwegian European Union membership referendum
- 1994 Polish local elections
- 1994 Slovak parliamentary election
- 1994 Stockholm municipal election
- 1994 Swedish general election
- 1994 Turkish local elections
- 1994 Ukrainian parliamentary election
- 1994 Ukrainian presidential election
- 1994 Austrian legislative election
- 1994 German federal election
- 1994 German presidential election

=== European Parliament ===
- 1994 European Parliament election
- 1994 European Parliament election in Belgium
- 1994 European Parliament election in Denmark
- 1994 European Parliament election in Portugal
- 1994 European Parliament election in the United Kingdom
- 1994 European Parliament election in France
- 1994 European Parliament election in Germany
- 1994 European Parliament election in Greece
- 1994 European Parliament election in Ireland
- 1994 European Parliament election in Italy
- 1994 European Parliament election in Luxembourg
- 1994 European Parliament election in the Netherlands
- 1994 European Parliament election in Spain
- 1994 European Parliament election in Germany
- 1994 European Parliament election in Spain

=== France ===
- 1994 European Parliament election in France
- 1994 French cantonal elections

=== Moldova ===
- 1994 Moldovan parliamentary election
- 1994 Moldovan referendum

=== United Kingdom ===
- 1994 Barking by-election
- 1994 Bradford South by-election
- 1994 Dagenham by-election
- 1994 Dudley West by-election
- 1994 Eastleigh by-election
- 1994 European Parliament election in the United Kingdom
- Richard Huggett
- 1994 Labour Party leadership election
- 1994 Scottish regional elections
- 1994 Monklands East by-election
- 1994 Newham North East by-election
- 1994 Rotherham by-election

==== United Kingdom local ====
- 1994 United Kingdom local elections

===== English local =====
- 1994 Bristol City Council election
- 1994 Lambeth Council election
- 1994 Lewisham Council election
- 1994 Manchester Council election
- 1994 Newham Council election
- 1994 Southwark Council election
- 1994 Tower Hamlets Council election
- 1994 Trafford Council election
- 1994 Wolverhampton Council election

== North America ==
- 1994 Aruban general election
- 1993–1994 Belizean municipal elections
- 1994 Costa Rican general election
- 1994 Guatemalan parliamentary election
- 1994 Panamanian general election
- 1994 Salvadoran general election

=== Canada ===
- 1994 Brantford municipal election
- 1994 Edmonton municipal by-election
- 1994 Ottawa municipal election
- 1994 Quebec general election
- 1994 Quebec municipal elections
- 1994 Toronto municipal election

=== Caribbean ===
- 1994 Anguillian general election
- 1994 Aruban general election
- 1994 Antigua and Barbuda general election
- 1994 Barbadian general election
- 1994 Dominican Republic general election
- 1994 Vincentian general election

=== Mexico ===
- 1994 Mexican general election

=== United States ===
- 1994 United States Senate elections

==== United States Senate ====
- 1994 United States Senate elections
- 1994 United States Senate election in Arizona
- 1994 United States Senate election in California
- 1994 United States Senate election in Connecticut
- 1994 United States Senate election in Delaware
- 1994 United States Senate election in Florida
- 1994 United States Senate election in Hawaii
- 1994 United States Senate election in Indiana
- 1994 United States Senate election in Maine
- 1994 United States Senate election in Maryland
- 1994 United States Senate election in Massachusetts
- 1994 United States Senate election in Michigan
- 1994 United States Senate election in Minnesota
- 1994 United States Senate election in Mississippi
- 1994 United States Senate election in Missouri
- 1994 United States Senate election in Montana
- 1994 United States Senate election in Nebraska
- 1994 United States Senate election in Nevada
- 1994 United States Senate election in New Jersey
- 1994 United States Senate election in New Mexico
- 1994 United States Senate election in New York
- 1994 United States Senate election in North Dakota
- 1994 United States Senate election in Ohio
- 1994 United States Senate election in Oklahoma
- 1994 United States Senate special election in Oklahoma
- 1994 United States Senate election in Pennsylvania
- 1994 United States Senate election in Rhode Island
- 1994 United States Senate special election in Tennessee
- 1994 United States Senate election in Tennessee
- 1994 United States Senate election in Texas
- 1994 United States Senate election in Utah
- 1994 United States Senate election in Vermont
- 1994 United States Senate election in Virginia
- 1994 United States Senate election in Washington
- 1994 United States Senate election in West Virginia
- 1994 United States Senate election in Wisconsin
- 1994 United States Senate election in Wyoming

==== United States lieutenant gubernatorial ====
- 1994 Alabama lieutenant gubernatorial election
- 1994 Arkansas lieutenant gubernatorial election
- 1994 California lieutenant gubernatorial election
- 1994 Georgia lieutenant gubernatorial election
- 1994 Oklahoma lieutenant gubernatorial election
- 1994 Texas lieutenant gubernatorial election

==== United States gubernatorial ====
- 1994 Alabama gubernatorial election
- 1994 Alaska gubernatorial election
- 1994 Arizona gubernatorial election
- 1994 Arkansas gubernatorial election
- 1994 California gubernatorial election
- 1994 Colorado gubernatorial election
- 1994 Connecticut gubernatorial election
- 1994 Florida gubernatorial election
- 1994 Georgia gubernatorial election
- 1994 Hawaii gubernatorial election
- 1994 Idaho gubernatorial election
- 1994 Iowa gubernatorial election
- 1994 Kansas gubernatorial election
- 1994 Maine gubernatorial election
- 1994 Maryland gubernatorial election
- 1994 Massachusetts gubernatorial election
- 1994 Michigan gubernatorial election
- 1994 Minnesota gubernatorial election
- 1994 Nebraska gubernatorial election
- 1994 Nevada gubernatorial election
- 1994 New Hampshire gubernatorial election
- 1994 New Mexico gubernatorial election
- 1994 New York gubernatorial election
- 1994 Ohio gubernatorial election
- 1994 Oklahoma gubernatorial election
- 1994 Oregon gubernatorial election
- 1994 Pennsylvania gubernatorial election
- 1994 Rhode Island gubernatorial election
- 1994 South Carolina gubernatorial election
- 1994 South Dakota gubernatorial election
- 1994 Tennessee gubernatorial election
- 1994 Texas gubernatorial election
- 1994 United States gubernatorial elections
- 1994 Vermont gubernatorial election
- 1994 Wisconsin gubernatorial election
- 1994 Wyoming gubernatorial election

==== United States mayoral ====
- 1994 Anchorage mayoral election
- 1994 Auburn, Alabama municipal election
- 1994 Fort Lauderdale mayoral election
- 1994 Irvine mayoral election
- 1994 Little Rock mayoral election
- 1994 New Orleans mayoral election
- 1994 Newark mayoral election
- 1994 Oakland mayoral election
- 1994 San Jose mayoral election
- 1994 Shreveport mayoral election
- 1994 Sioux Falls mayoral election
- 1994 Washington, D.C. mayoral election

==== California ====
- 1994 California State Assembly election
- 1994 California Attorney General election
- 1994 California Insurance Commissioner election
- 1994 California Secretary of State election
- 1994 California State Controller election
- 1994 California elections
- 1994 California State Treasurer election
- 1994 California Superintendent of Public Instruction election
- 1994 California Courts of Appeal election
- 1994 California State Senate election
- United States House of Representatives elections in California, 1994
- United States Senate election in California, 1994

==== Massachusetts ====
- 1994 Massachusetts general election

==== Oklahoma ====
- 1994 Oklahoma state elections

== Oceania ==
- 1994 Cook Islands general election
- 1994 Fijian general election
- 1994 Kiribati parliamentary election
- 1994 Kiribati presidential election

=== Australia ===
- 1994 Bonython by-election
- 1994 Elizabeth state by-election
- 1994 Fremantle by-election
- 1994 Mackellar by-election
- 1994 Northern Territory general election
- 1994 Taylor state by-election
- 1994 Torrens state by-election
- 1994 Warringah by-election
- 1994 Werriwa by-election

== South America ==
- 1994 Argentine Constitutional Assembly election
- 1994 Brazilian general election
- 1994 Colombian parliamentary election
- 1994 Colombian presidential election
- 1994 Ecuadorian parliamentary election
- 1994 Uruguayan general election
- August 1994 Uruguayan constitutional referendum
