= 1994 Oklahoma lieutenant gubernatorial election =

- November 8, 1994
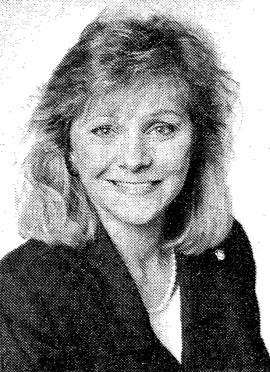

Nominee	Mary Fallin	Nance Diamond	Bruce Hartnitt
Party	Republican	Democratic	Independent
Popular vote	489,359	435,215	60,384
Percentage	49.69%	44.18%	6.13%
- County results Fallin: 40–50% 50–60% 60–70% 70–80% Diamond: 40–50% 50–60% 60–70% 70–80%
Lieutenant Governor before election
Jack Mildren
Democratic
Elected Lieutenant Governor
Mary Fallin
Republican

The 1994 Oklahoma lieutenant gubernatorial election was held on November 8, 1994, to elect the Lieutenant Governor of Oklahoma, concurrently with elections to the United States Senate, U.S. House of Representatives, governor, and other state and local elections. Primary elections were held on August 23, 1994, with runoff elections held on September 20 in races where no single candidate cleared at least 50% of the vote.

Incumbent Democratic lieutenant governor Jack Mildren was eligible to run for re-election to a second term in office, but announced in January 1994 he would instead run for governor. During what would later became known as the Republican Revolution, Republican state representative Mary Fallin defeated Democratic community activist Nance Diamond to become the first female and first Republican lieutenant governor in the state's history.

== Democratic primary ==
=== Candidates ===
==== Nominee ====
- Nance Diamond, community activist and teacher

==== Eliminated in primary runoff ====
- Bob Cullison, president pro tempore of the Oklahoma Senate (1988–present) from the 34th district (1979–present)

==== Eliminated in primary ====
- Dave McBride, former Oklahoma Public Safety Commissioner
- Walt Roberts, state representative from the 18th district (1987–1991)

=== Endorsements ===
Bob Cullison

State legislators

- Stratton Taylor, state senator from the 12th district (1982–present)

Labor unions

- Oklahoma Public Employees Association (also endorsed Roberts)

Organizations

- Oklahoma Fraternal Order of Police (runoff election only)
Walt Roberts

Labor unions

- Oklahoma Education Association
- Oklahoma Public Employees Association (also endorsed Cullison)

Organizations

- Oklahoma Fraternal Order of Police

=== Results ===
Democratic primary results
Party	Candidate	Votes	%
Democratic	Nance Diamond	156,624	36.80
Democratic	Bob Cullison	118,210	27.77
Democratic	Dave McBride	101,533	23.86
Democratic	Walt Roberts	49,207	11.57
Total votes		425,574	100.0
Runoff election
Democratic	Nance Diamond	210,031	56.31
Democratic	Bob Cullison	162,920	43.69
Total votes		372,951	100.0

== Republican primary ==
=== Candidates ===
==== Nominee ====
- Mary Fallin, state representative from the 85th district (1991–present)

==== Eliminated in primary runoff ====
- Terry Neese, business owner and nominee for lieutenant governor in 1990

==== Eliminated in primary ====
- Ronnie Eisenhour, funeral home director

=== Endorsements ===
Mary Fallin

Labor unions

- Oklahoma Public Employees Association

=== Results ===
Republican primary results
Party	Candidate	Votes	%
Republican	Terry Neese	73,336	37.57
Republican	Mary Fallin	69,785	35.75
Republican	Ronnie Eisenhour	52,081	26.68
Total votes		195,202	100.0
Runoff election
Republican	Mary Fallin	67,000	52.97
Republican	Terry Neese	59,488	47.03
Total votes		126,488	100.0

== General election ==
=== Post-primary endorsements ===
Nance Diamond (D)

Statewide officials

- Dave McBride, former Oklahoma Public Safety Commissioner (previously ran against Diamond)

=== Results ===
1994 Oklahoma lieutenant gubernatorial election
Party	Candidate	Votes	%
Republican	Mary Fallin	489,539	49.69
Democratic	Nance Diamond	435,215	44.18
Independent	Bruce Hartnitt	60,384	6.13
Total votes		985,138	100.0
Republican gain from Democratic			
