= 1990 Oklahoma lieutenant gubernatorial election =

- November 6, 1990
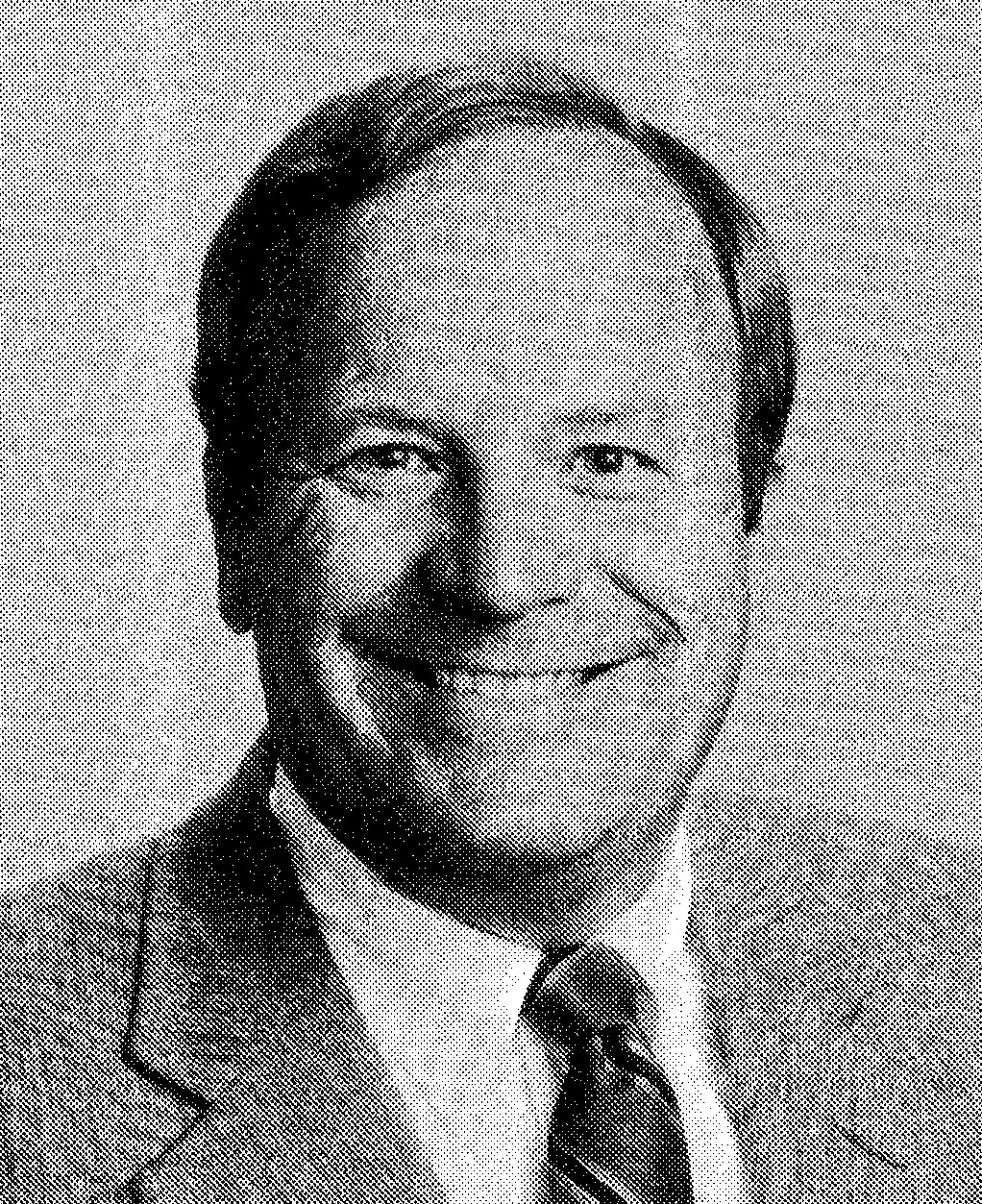

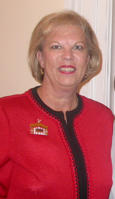
Nominee	Jack Mildren	Terry Neese
Party	Democratic	Republican
Popular vote	537,777	345,831
Percentage	60.86%	39.14%
- County results Mildren: 50–60% 60–70% 70–80% 80–90% Neese: 50–60% 60–70%
Lieutenant Governor before election
Robert S. Kerr III
Democratic
Elected Lieutenant Governor
Jack Mildren
Democratic

The 1990 Oklahoma lieutenant gubernatorial election was held on November 6, 1990, to elect the Lieutenant Governor of Oklahoma, concurrently with elections to the United States Senate, U.S. House of Representatives, governor, and other state and local elections. Primary elections were held on August 28, 1990, with runoff elections held on September 18 in races where no single candidate cleared at least 50% of the vote.

Incumbent Democratic lieutenant governor Robert S. Kerr III, who was originally considering a run for governor, opted to run for Oklahoma's 3rd congressional district in 1990, losing in the Democratic primary to Bill Brewster. Former professional football player Jack Mildren won the open race against Republican businesswoman Terry Neese.

== Democratic primary ==
=== Candidates ===
==== Nominee ====
- Jack Mildren, former defensive back for the Baltimore Colts (1972–1973), New England Patriots (1974), and former quarterback for the University of Oklahoma

==== Eliminated in primary runoff ====
- Jim Davis, Oklahoma State University professor

==== Eliminated in primary ====
- Lee Cate, former state senator (1973–1987) and former state representative (1966–1973)
- Huey P. Long, city manager of Mustang and religious minister
- Roger Pugh, business owner and former Oklahoma director of the National Federation of Independent Business

==== Declined ====
- Robert S. Kerr III, incumbent lieutenant governor (1987–present) (ran for U.S. House)

=== Results ===
Democratic primary results
Party	Candidate	Votes	%
Democratic	Jack Mildren	214,983	44.44
Democratic	Jim Davis	109,808	22.70
Democratic	Huey P. Long	50,762	10.49
Democratic	Roger Pugh	46,848	9.68
Democratic	Lee Cate	32,846	6.79
Democratic	Will Decker	28,524	5.90
Total votes		483,771	100.0
Runoff election
Democratic	Jack Mildren	269,059	59.81
Democratic	Jim Davis	180,747	40.19
Total votes		449,806	100.0

== Republican primary ==
=== Candidates ===
==== Nominee ====
- Terry Neese, businesswoman

==== Eliminated in primary runoff ====
- Neal McCaleb, Oklahoma Secretary of Transportation (1987–1990) and former minority leader of the Oklahoma House of Representatives (1979–1983) from the 35th district (1974–1983)

==== Eliminated in primary ====
- James Braly, attorney and World War II veteran

==== Withdrew before primary ====
- Carol Ann Ferguson Withrow, businesswoman (remained on ballot)

=== Results ===
Republican primary results
Party	Candidate	Votes	%
Republican	Terry Neese	68,498	38.95
Republican	Neal McCaleb	68,225	38.79
Republican	Carol Ann Ferguson Withrow (withdrawn)	28,445	16.17
Republican	James Braly	10,669	6.09
Total votes		175,867	100.0
Runoff election
Republican	Terry Neese	92,151	51.74
Republican	Neal McCaleb	85,927	48.26
Total votes		178,078	100.0

== General election ==
=== Results ===
1990 Oklahoma lieutenant gubernatorial election
Party	Candidate	Votes	%
Democratic	Jack Mildren	537,777	60.86
Republican	Terry Neese	345,831	39.14
Total votes		883,608	100.0
Democratic hold			
