= Marcelo Dotti =

Ecuadorian politician (1942–2026)

Marcelo Dotti (December 2, 1942 – February 14, 2026) was an Ecuadorian politician.

== Life and career ==
Dotti was born in Quito on December 2, 1942. He began his career in radio in 1984 on the program "Nuestra realidad". In 1988, he became campaign manager of Rodrigo Paz Delgado, candidate of the Popular Democracy for mayor of Quito, also advising him for much of his term. After joining the party, he tried to reach the prefecture of the province of Pichincha in the 1992 elections, but lost in a close race against Federico Pérez Intriago, candidate of the Frente Radical Alfarista.

In the legislative elections of 1994 he was elected deputy of Pichincha for Popular Democracy; while in his role as a radio broadcaster he became the director of the news program "La voz de la gente" on the Quito radio station Radio Sucesos. In November 1995, he joined the Social Christian Party as part of Jaime Nebot's presidential campaign team. When asked if he regretted having criticized León Febres-Cordero Ribadeneyra, the top leader of the Social Christians, in the past, he said that although he did not regret it, at that time he did not understand the meaning of the "human capitalism that now predominates throughout the world."

In the 1996 sectional elections he again tried unsuccessfully to be elected prefect of Pichincha, after being the favorite in the polls during the course of the campaign.

For the Constituent Assembly of 1997 he was a representative of Pichincha for the Social Christian Party. The following year, in the legislative elections of 1998, he was elected national deputy a position for which he was re-elected in 2002, although this time for the province of Pichincha.

In August 2006, he resigned from Congress to run as a candidate for the Andean Parliament, resulting in the only Social Christian to be elected during that election to the position.

Dotti died in Quito on February 14, 2026, at the age of 83.
