= Bernice Shedrick =

American politician (1940–2026)

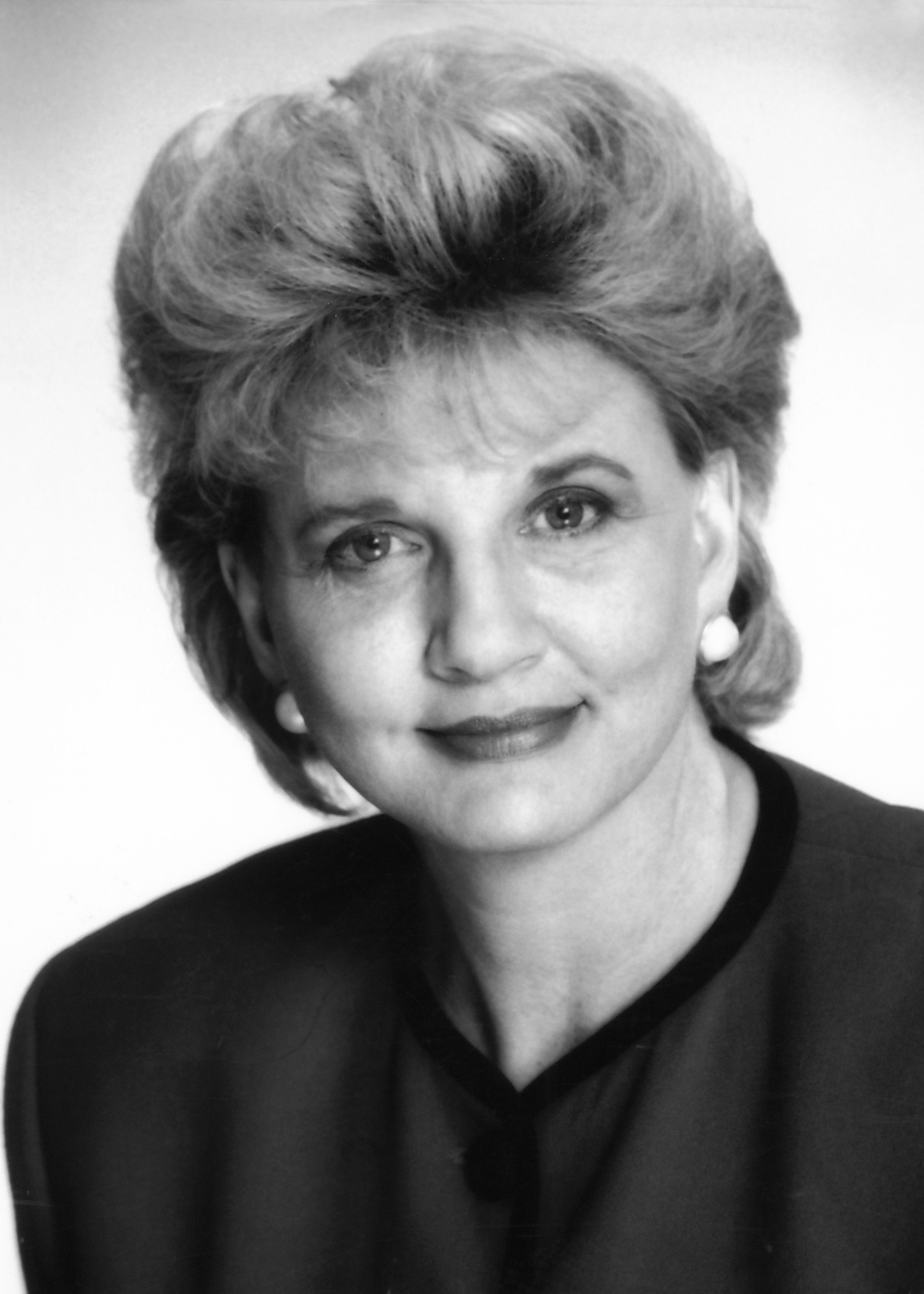

Member of the Oklahoma Senate from the 21st district
- In office 1980–1996
- Preceded by: Robert M. Murphy
- Succeeded by: Mike Morgan

Personal details
- Born: Bernice Link; August 9, 1940 Chickasha, Oklahoma, U.S.
- Died: January 20, 2026 (aged 85)
- Party: Democratic
- Education: Oklahoma State University

Mary Bernice Shedrick (August 9, 1940 – January 20, 2026) was an American politician who served in the Oklahoma Senate representing the 21st district from 1980 to 1996. In 1994, she was a candidate for Governor of Oklahoma.

== Early life ==
Shedrick was born in Chickasha, Oklahoma, on August 9, 1940, to parents Irene May Williams-Link and Arthur Cole Link Sr. Her father died when she was only 11 years old and her mother passed two years later. Shedrick's oldest brother's wife stayed with the siblings while her husband was overseas for the Korean War. The four siblings were later separated, all living with different family members. Shedrick moved with her older brother and wife to Wynnewood, Oklahoma. They later moved to Norman, Oklahoma where Shedrick met her husband. The two were married for 32 years then divorced in 1995, yet remained close friends until his death in 2006. Shedrick earned both her bachelor's and master's degrees from Oklahoma State University.

She taught in the Stillwater Public School system from 1969 to 1980 before running for a seat in the state senate.

== Oklahoma Senate (1980–1996) ==
Elected in 1980, Shedrick was only the third woman to serve in the Oklahoma Senate. While serving in the Senate, Shedrick earned her Juris Doctor from the Oklahoma City University School of Law. In 1996 Shedrick was inducted into the Oklahoma Women's Hall of Fame. Shedrick focused on education during her time in the Senate. She served as primary author on HB 1017, also known as the Oklahoma Educational Reform Act, which was signed into law by Governor Henry Bellmon in April 1990. She was also an original author of HB 1286 which established the Oklahoma School of Science and Mathematics in 1983. There is a library in the school named after Shedrick.

In 1994, Shedrick ran in the gubernatorial election. Shedrick raised close to $900,000 for her campaign and traveled all over the state. Her opponent, Jack Mildren, won the run-off for the democratic candidacy and Shedrick returned to the Senate for her final two years in the political arena.

== Later life and death ==
Shedrick practiced law after retiring from the state legislature. She also worked as an administrative law judge and for the Oklahoma Ethics Commission. She died on January 20, 2026, at the age of 85.
