= 1998 California Courts of Appeal election =

The 1998 California Courts of Appeal election was held November 3, 1998. The judges of the California Courts of Appeal are either approved to remain in their seat or rejected by the voters. All of the judges kept their seats.

== Results ==
Final results from the California Secretary of State:

=== District 1 ===
==== Division 1 ====
Associate Justice Douglas E. Swager
Vote on retention	Votes	%
Yes	727,802	74.60%
No	247,756	25.40%
Invalid or blank votes	705,919	41.98%
Totals	1,681,477	100.00%
Voter turnout	%	

==== Division 2 ====
Associate Justice James R. Lambden
Vote on retention	Votes	%
Yes	714,111	74.59%
No	243,223	25.41%
Invalid or blank votes	724,143	43.07%
Totals	1,681,477	100.00%
Voter turnout	%	

Associate Justice Ignazio John Ruvolo
Vote on retention	Votes	%
Yes	692,941	73.01%
No	256,224	26.99%
Invalid or blank votes	732,312	43.55%
Totals	1,681,477	100.00%
Voter turnout	%	

==== Division 3 ====
Presiding Justice Michael J. Phelan
Vote on retention	Votes	%
Yes	717,477	75.55%
No	232,144	24.45%
Invalid or blank votes	731,856	24.45%
Totals	1,681,477	100.00%
Voter turnout	%	

Associate Justice Carol A. Corrigan
Vote on retention	Votes	%
Yes	734,392	77.01%
No	219,260	22.99%
Invalid or blank votes	727,825	43.28%
Totals	1,681,477	100.00%
Voter turnout	%	

Associate Justice Joanne C. Parrilli
Vote on retention	Votes	%
Yes	726,293	76.32%
No	225,376	23.68%
Invalid or blank votes	729,808	43.40%
Totals	1,681,477	100.00%
Voter turnout	%	

Associate Justice Wes Walker
Vote on retention	Votes	%
Yes	703,891	74.96%
No	235,189	25.04%
Invalid or blank votes	742,397	44.15%
Totals	1,681,477	100.00%
Voter turnout	%	

==== Division 4 ====
Presiding Justice Daniel M. "Mike" Hanlon
Vote on retention	Votes	%
Yes	710,748	75.34%
No	232,616	24.66%
Invalid or blank votes	738,113	43.90%
Totals	1,681,477	100.00%
Voter turnout	%	

Associate Justice William R. McGuiness
Vote on retention	Votes	%
Yes	706,769	75.37%
No	230,942	24.63%
Invalid or blank votes	743,766	44.23%
Totals	1,681,477	100.00
Voter turnout	%	

Associate Justice Timothy A. Reardon
Vote on retention	Votes	%
Yes	720,461	75.99%
No	227,602	24.01%
Invalid or blank votes	733,414	43.62%
Totals	1,681,477	100.00%
Voter turnout	%	

==== Division 5 ====
Associate Justice Lawrence T. Stevens
Vote on retention	Votes	%
Yes	710,010	76.20%
No	221,765	23.80%
Invalid or blank votes	749,702	44.59%
Totals	1,681,477	100.00%
Voter turnout	%	

=== District 2 ===
==== Division 1 ====
Presiding Justice Vaino Spencer
Vote on retention	Votes	%
Yes	1,271,364	78.36%
No	351,160	21.64%
Invalid or blank votes	860,668	34.66%
Totals	2,483,192	100.00%
Voter turnout	%	

==== Division 2 ====
Associate Justice Morio L. Fukuto
Vote on retention	Votes	%
Yes	1,189,500	74.84%
No	399,958	25.16%
Invalid or blank votes	893,734	35.99%
Totals	2,483,192	100.00%
Voter turnout	%	

Associate Justice John Zebrowski
Vote on retention	Votes	%
Yes	1,200,971	75.50%
No	389,702	24.50%
Invalid or blank votes	892,519	35.94%
Totals	2,483,192	100.00%
Voter turnout	%	

==== Division 3 ====
Associate Justice Walter Croskey
Vote on retention	Votes	%
Yes	1,220,220	77.66%
No	351,059	22.34%
Invalid or blank votes	911,913	36.72%
Totals	2,483,192	100.00%
Voter turnout	%	

==== Division 4 ====
Presiding Justice Charles S. Vogel
Vote on retention	Votes	%
Yes	1,239,888	78.64%
No	336,843	21.36%
Invalid or blank votes	906,461	36.50%
Totals	2,483,192	100.00%
Voter turnout	%	

Associate Justice Daniel A. Curry
Vote on retention	Votes	%
Yes	1,238,240	79.08%
No	327,538	20.92%
Invalid or blank votes	917,414	36.94%
Totals	2,483,192	100.00%
Voter turnout	%	

==== Division 5 ====
Associate Justice Orville "Jack" Armstrong
Vote on retention	Votes	%
Yes	1,275,037	80.12%
No	316,403	19.88%
Invalid or blank votes	891,752	35.91%
Totals	2,483,192	100.00%
Voter turnout	%	

==== Division 6 ====
Associate Justice Paul H. Coffee
Vote on retention	Votes	%
Yes	1,274,400	79.94%
No	319,861	20.06%
Invalid or blank votes	888,931	35.80%
Totals	2,483,192	100.00%
Voter turnout	%	

Associate Justice Arthur Gilbert
Vote on retention	Votes	%
Yes	1,263,437	79.56%
No	324,548	20.44%
Invalid or blank votes	895,207	36.05%
Totals	2,483,192	100.00%
Voter turnout	%	

==== Division 7 ====
Associate Justice Earl Johnson, Jr.
Vote on retention	Votes	%
Yes	1,255,347	79.38%
No	326,165	20.62%
Invalid or blank votes	901,680	36.31%
Totals	2,483,192	100.00%
Voter turnout	%	

Associate Justice Richard C. Neal
Vote on retention	Votes	%
Yes	1,243,137	79.14%
No	327,754	20.86%
Invalid or blank votes	912,301	36.74%
Totals	2,483,192	100.00%
Voter turnout	%	

=== District 3 ===
Associate Justice Connie Callahan
Vote on retention	Votes	%
Yes	518,935	75.73%
No	166,270	24.27%
Invalid or blank votes	320,473	31.87%
Totals	1,005,678	100.00%
Voter turnout	%	

Associate Justice Harry Hull
Vote on retention	Votes	%
Yes	484,595	72.48%
No	184,009	27.52%
Invalid or blank votes	337,074	33.52%
Totals	1,005,678	100.00%
Voter turnout	%	

Associate Justice George Nicholson
Vote on retention	Votes	%
Yes	508,056	74.75%
No	171,651	25.25%
Invalid or blank votes	325,971	32.41%
Totals	1,005,678	100.00%
Voter turnout	%	

=== District 4 ===
==== Division 1 ====
Presiding Justice Daniel J. Kremer
Vote on retention	Votes	%
Yes	1,030,251	74.59%
No	345,455	25.01%
Invalid or blank votes	832,770	37.71%
Totals	2,218,476	100.00%
Voter turnout	%	

Associate Justice Alex C. McDonald
Vote on retention	Votes	%
Yes	1,004,772	73.89%
No	355,106	26.11%
Invalid or blank votes	848,598	38.42%
Totals	2,218,476	100.00%
Voter turnout	%	

Associate Justice James A. McIntyre
Vote on retention	Votes	%
Yes	1,012,507	74.50%
No	346,576	25.50%
Invalid or blank votes	849,393	38.46%
Totals	2,218,476	100.00%
Voter turnout	%	

==== Division 2 ====
Presiding Justice Manuel A. Ramirez
Vote on retention	Votes	%
Yes	1,007,254	72.92%
No	374,016	27.08%
Invalid or blank votes	827,206	37.46%
Totals	2,218,476	100.00%
Voter turnout	%	

Associate Justice Barton C. Gaut
Vote on retention	Votes	%
Yes	947,758	71.04%
No	386,360	28.96%
Invalid or blank votes	874,358	39.59%
Totals	2,218,476	100.00%
Voter turnout	%	

Associate Justice James D. Ward
Vote on retention	Votes	%
Yes	1,013,868	75.14%
No	335,495	24.86%
Invalid or blank votes	859,113	38.90%
Totals	2,218,476	100.00%
Voter turnout	%	

==== Division 3 ====
Presiding Justice Davide G. Sills
Vote on retention	Votes	%
Yes	998,091	75.00%
No	332,667	25.00%
Invalid or blank votes	877,718	39.74%
Totals	2,218,476	100.00%
Voter turnout	%	

Associate Justice William W. Bedsworth
Vote on retention	Votes	%
Yes	969,025	73.86%
No	342,922	26.14%
Invalid or blank votes	896,529	40.59%
Totals	2,218,476	100.00%
Voter turnout	%	

Associate Justice W.F. "Bill" Rylaarsdam
Vote on retention	Votes	%
Yes	920,807	70.06%
No	393,572	29.94%
Invalid or blank votes	894,097	40.48%
Totals	2,218,476	100.00%
Voter turnout	%	

Associate Justice Edward J. Wallin
Vote on retention	Votes	%
Yes	940,915	71.18%
No	380,943	28.82%
Invalid or blank votes	886,618	40.15%
Totals	2,218,476	100.00%
Voter turnout	%	

=== District 5 ===
Presiding Justice Jim Ardaiz
Vote on retention	Votes	%
Yes	332,970	74.59%
No	113,447	25.41%
Invalid or blank votes	168,914	27.45%
Totals	615,331	100.00%
Voter turnout	%	

Associate Justice Bert Levy
Vote on retention	Votes	%
Yes	332,854	75.37%
No	108,774	24.63%
Invalid or blank votes	173,703	28.23%
Totals	615,331	100.00%
Voter turnout	%	

Associate Justice Steve Vartabedian
Vote on retention	Votes	%
Yes	316,280	72.16%
No	122,038	27.84%
Invalid or blank votes	177,013	28.77%
Totals	615,331	100.00%
Voter turnout	%	

Associate Justice Becky Wiseman
Vote on retention	Votes	%
Yes	334,709	75.45%
No	108,907	24.55%
Invalid or blank votes	171,715	27.91%
Totals	615,331	100.00%
Voter turnout	%	

=== District 6 ===
Presiding Justice Christopher C. Cottle
Vote on retention	Votes	%
Yes	316,262	78.76%
No	85,296	21.24%
Invalid or blank votes	225,409	35.95%
Totals	626,967	100.00%
Voter turnout	%	
