= Carol Corrigan =

American judge (born 1948)

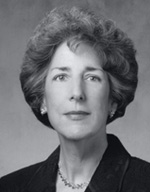

Associate Justice of the Supreme Court of California
- Incumbent
- Assumed office January 4, 2006
- Appointed by: Arnold Schwarzenegger
- Preceded by: Janice Rogers Brown

Personal details
- Born: Carol Ann Corrigan; August 16, 1948 (age 78) Stockton, California, U.S.
- Party: Republican
- Education: Holy Names College (BA); University of California, Hastings (JD)

Carol Ann Corrigan (born August 16, 1948) is an associate justice of the California Supreme Court. She is a former prosecutor.

== Background ==
Corrigan, the daughter of a newspaperman and a homemaker, grew up in the San Joaquin Valley city of Stockton, California. She graduated from Saint Mary's High School in Stockton, and attended the Catholic, then women-only, Holy Names College in Oakland, graduating in 1970. After a brief stint in a graduate program in psychology, Corrigan enrolled at the University of California, Hastings College of the Law, where she served as Notes and Comments Editor of the Hastings Law Journal. She received her Juris Doctor degree in 1975 and was admitted to the California bar the same year.

Corrigan worked as a prosecutor in Alameda County, California from 1975, and as a senior prosecutor from 1985 until 1987 when she was appointed to a municipal court in the county. In 1991 she became a Judge of the Alameda County Superior Court, the state's principal trial court there, where she was affectionately known as Big Bird. In 1994, Governor Pete Wilson appointed her as an associate justice in the California Court of Appeal, First District. She was elected to a term later in 1994, and re-elected in 1998. There, she served on a commission that overhauled the state's court rules.

Corrigan has resided in and around Oakland for most of her adult life.

== California Supreme Court ==
On December 9, 2005, California Governor Arnold Schwarzenegger nominated her to the Supreme Court of California to replace Justice Janice Rogers Brown. Corrigan was confirmed in this position January 4, 2006.

Corrigan's notable opinions include a March 2, 2017, ruling in City of San Jose v. Superior Court, that emails and text messages on personal devices of government employees are subject to disclosure under the California Public Records Act. In 2012, she dissented in a case concerning the statute of limitations for claims of abuse by a priest. In 2011, she authored the majority opinion in Save the Plastic Bag Coalition v. City of Manhattan Beach, in which the court upheld a city ordinance banning plastic bags, reversing the appellate court. In 2008, she wrote a dissent in the same-sex marriage case, In re Marriage Cases, which held that the Equal Protection Clause of the California Constitution mandated that the state allow same-sex marriages.

In 2022, Corrigan voted to uphold a lower-court order that forced UC Berkeley to cut its enrollment numbers after a group of Berkeley residents sued the university. The Berkeley residents claimed that UC Berkeley was violating the California Environmental Quality Act by expanding its enrollment numbers.

== See also ==
- List of justices of the Supreme Court of California

== Video ==
- Appearances on C-SPAN

Legal offices
Preceded by	Associate Justice of the California Court of Appeal, First District; 1994–2006	Succeeded by
Preceded by Janice Rogers Brown	Associate Justice of the Supreme Court of California; 2006–present	Incumbent
