= 1994 Sioux Falls mayoral election =

- November 22, 1994; December 6, 1994

Candidate	Gary W. Hanson	Jack G. Rentschler
First round	7,991; 29.20%	8,630; 31.53%
Runoff	14,205; 55.85%	11,230; 44.15%
Candidate	Rick Knobe	Loila Hunking
First round	4,209; 15.38%	3,931; 14.36%
Runoff	Eliminated	Eliminated
Mayor before election
Jack White
Nonpartisan
Elected mayor
Gary W. Hanson
Nonpartisan

The 1994 Sioux Falls mayoral election took place on December 6, 1994, following a primary on November 22, 1994. The election was the first to take place after voters adopted a mayor–council government on September 13, 1994, which scheduled a new mayoral election two months later. Incumbent Mayor Jack White declined to seek another term.

Seven candidates ran to succeed White, including former State Representative Jack G. Rentschler, City Commissioner Gary W. Hanson, former Mayor Rick Knobe, and former City Commissioner Loila Hunking. Rentschler placed first in the primary with 32 percent of the vote, and Hanson placed second with 29 percent. In the general election, Hanson defeated Rentschler by a wide margin, winning with 56 percent of the vote.

== Primary election ==
=== Candidates ===
- Jack G. Rentschler, former State Representative
- Gary W. Hanson, City Commissioner
- Rick Knobe, former Mayor
- Loila Hunking, former City Commissioner
- Donald R. Blalock, construction manager
- Ross Reinhart, retired business executive
- Rich Nelson, plumber

=== Results ===
1994 Sioux Falls mayoral primary election
Party	Candidate	Votes	%
Nonpartisan	Jack G. Rentschler	8,630	31.53%
Nonpartisan	Gary W. Hanson	7,991	29.20%
Nonpartisan	Rick Knobe	4,209	15.38%
Nonpartisan	Loila Hunking	3,931	14.36%
Nonpartisan	Donald R. Blalock	1,277	1.12%
Nonpartisan	Ross Reinhart	1,034	3.78%
Nonpartisan	Rich Nelson	298	1.09%
Total votes		27,370	100.00%

== General election ==
=== Results ===
1994 Sioux Falls mayoral runoff election
Party	Candidate	Votes	%
Nonpartisan	Gary W. Hanson	14,205	55.85%
Nonpartisan	Jack G. Rentschler	11,230	44.15%
Total votes		25,435	100.00%
