= Save the Plastic Bag Coalition v. City of Manhattan Beach =

2011 California Supreme Court case

- Supreme Court of California

Argued May 4, 2011 Decided July 14, 2011
- Full case name: Save the Plastic Bag Coalition v. City of Manhattan Beach
- Citation(s): 52 Cal. 4th 155

Case history
- Prior history: Review granted, California Court of Appeals

Holding
- Reversed the judgment of the Court of Appeals ruling that the City of Manhattan Beach had to prepare an EIR before implementing a ban on plastic bags.

Court membership
- Chief Justice: Tani Cantil-Sakauye
- Associate Justices: Kathryn Werdegar, Ming Chin, Marvin R. Baxter, Carol Corrigan, Joyce L. Kennard, H. Walter Croskey - Associate Justice, Court of Appeal, Second Appellate District, Division 3

Case opinions
- Majority: Corrigan
- Concurrence: Cantil-Sakauye, Werdegar, Kennard, Baxter, Chin, Croskey

Laws applied
- California Environmental Quality Act

Save the Plastic Bag Coalition v. City of Manhattan Beach is a California Supreme Court case, decided by a full majority on July 14, 2011, in which the plaintiffs challenged the City of Manhattan Beach's ordinance banning single-use plastic bags.

== Background ==
On July 14, 2008, the City of Manhattan Beach adopted Ordinance No. 2115 to ban the use of single use plastic bags at "retail establishments, restaurants, vendor or non-profit vendor." The plastic ban ordinance is only applicable to plastic bags used to take goods away from a store, but not produce bags from grocery stores. As stated in Section 1, A of the ordinance, "As a coastal city Manhattan Beach has a strong interest in protecting the marine environment an element which contributes to the unique quality of life in the City."

The City of Manhattan Beach concluded the proposed ordinance would not have a significant effect on the environment and a Negative Declaration was prepared. Subsequently, a petition for a writ of mandate was filed with the Los Angeles Superior Court which was affirmed by the Appeals Court. A petition for review was submitted to California Supreme Court by City of Manhattan Beach and on April 21, 2010, the California Supreme Court accepted the City of Manhattan Beach's Petition. On July 14, 2011, by unanimous decision the California Supreme Court upheld the standing of the Save the Plastic Bag Coalition, but reversed the judgment by the Court of the appeals that there was substantial evidence in the administrative record that an environmental impact report should be prepared.

== Issues addressed ==
The two issues that were addressed include the following (as stated in the California Supreme Court opinion):

1. The standing requirements for a corporate entity to challenge a determination on the preparation of an environmental impact report
2. If the City of Manhattan Beach was required to prepare an environmental impact report on the effects of an ordinance banning the use of plastic bags by local businesses

== Parties ==
The Plaintiff - Save The Plastic Bag Coalition (the "Coalition"), founded by Elkay Plastics and Command Packaging, is an unincorporated association. Its members are plastic bag manufacturers, plastic bag distributors, retailers, and concerned citizens. The coalition grew quickly after the ordinance banning plastic bags was adopted by the City of Manhattan Beach and included several other companies that sell and distribute plastic bags to retail stores, restaurants and other businesses operating in the City of Manhattan Beach.

The Defendant - The City of Manhattan Beach. The City had completed an initial environmental study regarding the environmental impact of banning single-use plastic carry bags. The premise for the ban was that plastic bags make up a significant portion of litter within the city and create a significant eyesore throughout the community. The City of Manhattan performed the initial environmental study in June 2008 to meet the requirements of California Environmental Quality Act (CEQA). Based on that study, the City of Manhattan determined that an Environmental Impact Report (EIR) was not required and a Negative Declaration was prepared and adopted by the City along with the ordinance banning plastic bags on July 15, 2008.

== Rulings ==
=== Los Angeles Superior Court ===
On August 12, 2008, the Save the Plastic Bag Coalition submitted a writ of mandate to the Los Angeles Superior Court. The petitioners claim that the City of Manhattan Beach as the lead agency should have prepared an environmental impact report to address the assumptions of using plastic bags on the environment and analyze the impacts to the environment of increased usage of paper bags. Evidence was presented suggesting that using paper bags can have significant environmental impacts.

Included in the writ of mandate was the City of Oakland decision issued in April 2008. The City of Oakland approved a similar ordinance as City of Manhattan Beach using a "common sense" and two categorical exemptions from the California Environmental Quality Act. The Alameda Superior Court determined the City of Oakland had not considered the environmental effects of increased paper bag usage because a Notice of Exemption had been issued.

On February 29, 2009, the petition for a writ of mandate was granted by the Los Angeles Superior Court. The first issue the Superior Court determined was if the petitioner had standing. The petitioner was granted standing because they are not "a for profit corporation that is seeking a commercial advantage over a specific competitor." The second issue decided was that there was enough substantial evidence in the public record to support the conclusion that an environmental import report should be prepared to evaluate the impacts of increased paper bag usage prior to a decision by the City of Manhattan Beach.

=== California Court of Appeal ===
The appeal, written by Judge David P. Yaffe held the Superior Court decision. The opinion reviewed four reports (the Scottish Government Report, the Boustead Report, ULS Report, and the Franklin Report) presented as substantial evidence in the record. The opinion concludes the Save the Plastic Bag Coalition is granted standing because they are a "beneficially interested" party; the ordinance is a "project" pursuant to review subject to the California Environmental Quality Act; and there is a fair argument for the preparation of an environmental impact report.

The opinion highlights the four different reports that concluded, "a plastic bag ban is likely to lead to increased use of paper as well as reusable bags; paper bags have greater negative environmental effects as compared to plastic bags; and the negative environmental effects include greater nonrenewable energy and water consumption, greenhouse gas emissions, solid waste production, and acid rain." Based on a "low threshold for preparation of an environmental impact report" there is substantial evidence in the administrative record to support the conclusion that the plastic ban ordinance may have a significant impact on the environment, which requires the preparation of an environmental impact report to analyze the impacts. The City of Manhattan Beach lawyers argued the geographic size supports the conclusion that increased paper bag is negligible. However, as stated by the opinion, the Initial Study prepared by the City of Manhattan Beach did not include this analysis and statutory exemptions from the California Environmental Quality Act do not apply to Cities "based on geographic or population size."

The dissenting opinion, written by Judge J. Mosk, focuses on the language in the ordinance by clarifying the focus of the ordinance is on "distribution (not use) of plastic carryout bags" and "promotes the use of reusable bags (not paper bags) and does not consider the ordinance as a project pursuant to the California Environmental Quality Act. Also, the dissenting opinion, disputes the premise the reports presented are substantial evidence because they are general conclusions about the international plastic bag industry and/or does not specifically address the environmental impacts of plastic bags in a small coastal town in California.

=== California Supreme Court ===
The unanimous opinion written by Justice Corrigan concludes the Save the Plastic Bag Coalition satisfies the requirement for public interest, whereas the City argued the plaintiff does not have standing based on the Waste Management, supra, 79 Cal.App.4th 1223. The Supreme Court rejected "the Waste Management rule holding corporations to a higher standard in qualifying for public interest standing" and concluded, "the ordinance's ban on plastic bags would have a severe and immediate effect on their business in the City."

On the issue of whether there was a fair argument that City of Manhattan Beach prepare an environmental impact report, the Court ruled that, "Substantial evidence and common sense support the city's determination that its ordinance would have no significant environmental effect. Therefore, a negative declaration was sufficient to comply with the requirements of the California Environmental Quality Act." This decision was based on the "overreliance on generic studies of life cycle impacts" and the Court concluded proper perspective must be adhered in order to evaluate environmental impacts.

== Plastic Bag History ==
The high-density polyethylene (HDPE) single-use bag was invented by a Swedish company in the 1960s. The single-use plastic bag was introduced into the U.S. by ExxonMobil Corporation and had found its way to grocery stores by 1976. In the United States, there are approximately 92 billion plastic bags used annually by retail industries such as supermarkets and pharmacies as compared to roughly 5 billion paper bags. From a global perspective, it is estimated there are anywhere from 500 billion to 1 trillion plastic bags used each year. Due to concerns over litter and impacts to marine wildlife and environments, many countries have either banned or placed levies on plastic bags. Within the United States, there are 16 states that have introduced some type of legislation banning, imposing fees, or mandating plastic bag recycling. Following the San Francisco 2007 ordinance banning plastic bags, twelve California cities have enacted plastic bag ordinances, including Malibu, Santa Monica, Fairfax, Palo Alto, Long Beach and Manhattan Beach. Similar actions have taken place at the county level in Los Angeles, Marin and Santa Clara counties with numerous other cities and counties following suit with proposed plastic bag ordinances pending activation. In efforts to respond to pressure from retailers and environmental and special interest groups, the plastic bag industry is looking to increase the amount of recycled material in plastic bags to 40% by the year 2015. The plastic bag industry believes that by increasing the recycling of plastic bags, some 463 million pounds of greenhouse gas emissions and 300 million pounds of waste will be avoided on an annual basis.
