= Janice Rogers Brown =

American retired federal judge (born 1949)

Janice Brown
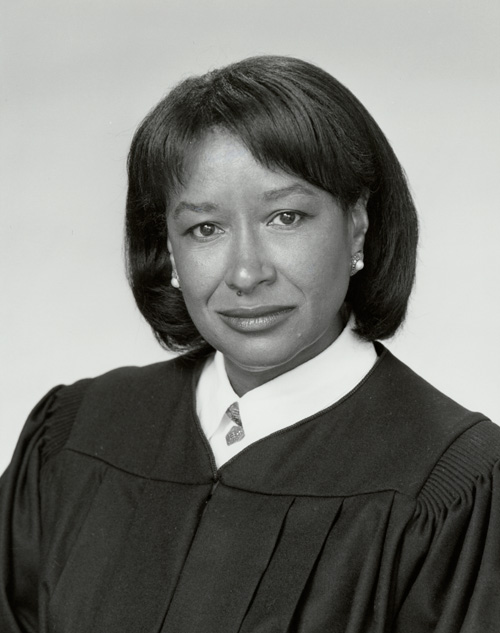
- Portrait, c. 1996–2005

Judge of the United States Court of Appeals for the District of Columbia Circuit
- In office June 10, 2006 – August 31, 2017
- Appointed by: George W. Bush
- Preceded by: Stephen F. Williams
- Succeeded by: Gregory G. Katsas

Associate Justice of the California Supreme Court
- In office May 3, 1996 – June 10, 2006
- Appointed by: Pete Wilson
- Preceded by: Ronald M. George
- Succeeded by: Carol Corrigan

Personal details
- Born: Janice Olivia Allen; May 11, 1949 (age 77) Greenville, Alabama, U.S.
- Party: Republican
- Spouses: Alan Brown (died 1988); Dewey Parker (m. 1991)
- Education: California State University, Sacramento (BA); University of California, Los Angeles (JD); University of Virginia (LLM)

Janice Rogers Brown (née Allen; born May 11, 1949) is an American jurist. She served as a United States circuit judge of the United States Court of Appeals for the District of Columbia Circuit from 2006 to 2017 and before that, Associate Justice of the California Supreme Court from 1996 to 2006. She is a member of the Federalist Society and frequently features at events hosted by the organization.

Her 2003 nomination by George W. Bush to the U.S. Court of Appeals for the District of Columbia Circuit was opposed by civil rights groups and stalled for nearly two years by Democratic senators who saw her as an extreme "conservative judicial activist.” She was eventually re-nominated and confirmed in 2006. The following month, after Justice Sandra Day O'Connor retired from the Supreme Court of the United States, Brown was reportedly considered as a potential nominee to replace O'Connor. Brown was ultimately not nominated to the Supreme Court.

== Early life and education ==
Brown was born Janice Olivia Allen in Greenville, Alabama, in 1949. Her father was a World War II veteran who sharecropped a leased 158-acre plot before reenlisting. After her parents separated, she was raised primarily by her paternal grandmother until, as a teenager, she moved to Sacramento, California, with her mother who was a nurse. When her mother remarried, she took the name Rogers.

Brown earned a B.A. from California State University, Sacramento, in 1974 while working as a single mother at the Department of Corrections where she met her first husband, Allen E. Brown Sr., who was an administrator there. She earned a J.D. from UCLA in 1977. She received a Master of Laws degree from the University of Virginia School of Law in 2004.

Brown has said that during her childhood her family refused to enter race-segregated businesses and that she as a "young single mother once called herself so leftist as to be almost Maoist."

== Early legal career ==
For the first two decades of her career, Brown primarily worked for government agencies.

From 1977 to 1979, she was Deputy Legislative Counsel for the California Legislative Counsel.

From 1979 to 1987, she served as California Deputy Attorney General for the Criminal and Civil Divisions.

From 1987 to 1989, Brown was Deputy Secretary and General Counsel for the California Business, Transportation and Housing Agency and a University of the Pacific McGeorge School of Law Adjunct Professor from 1988 to 1989.

She briefly entered private practice at the firm of Nielsen, Merksamer, Parrinello, Mueller & Naylor in 1990, but left in January 1991 to return to government as Legal Affairs Secretary for Governor Pete Wilson from January 1991 to November 1994. The job included diverse duties, ranging from analysis of administration policy, court decisions, and pending legislation to advice on clemency and extradition questions. The Legal Affairs Office monitored all significant state litigation and had general responsibility for supervising departmental counsel and acting as legal liaison between the Governor's office and executive departments.

== California Supreme Court ==
In November 1994, Wilson appointed Brown to the California Courts of Appeal, Third Appellate District.

In May 1996, Wilson appointed Brown as Associate Justice to the Supreme Court of California. Brown was rated "not qualified" by the State Bar of California JNE Commission for her lack of experience and tendency to inject her political views into her opinion. Brown was the first "not qualified" appointment to the California Supreme Court.

=== Tenure ===
In Hi-Voltage Wire-Works, Inc. v. City of San Jose (2000), Brown wrote overturning a program of racial set-asides adopted by the city of San Jose. The opinion upheld an amendment to the California Constitution which banned discrimination against or preferential treatment for any individual or group on the basis of race, sex, color, ethnicity, or national origin in public employment, education, or contracting.

Brown also wrote the majority opinion in Varian v. Delfino, an important First Amendment case involving the interpretation of California's SLAPP statute.

In another case, American Academy of Pediatrics v. Lungren (1997), Brown dissented from an opinion striking down a parental consent law for abortions. Brown, who declined to discuss her personal views on abortion when she was appointed to the court, defended the law during oral arguments. “Isn’t the law just acknowledging less capacity on the part of minors than adults, and isn’t that rational?” she asked.

In 2000, she authored the opinion in Kasler v. Lockyer, upholding the right of the State of California to ban semi-automatic firearms, and of the Attorney General of California to add to the list of prohibited weapons. Her opinion in that case clearly explained that the decision was not an endorsement of the policy, but rather recognition of the power of the state.

Brown was the lone dissenter to contend that a provision in the California Constitution requires drug offenders be given treatment instead of jail time, and also voted to uphold California's ban on semi-automatic firearms.

== U.S. Court of Appeals for the D.C. Circuit ==
=== Nomination and confirmation ===
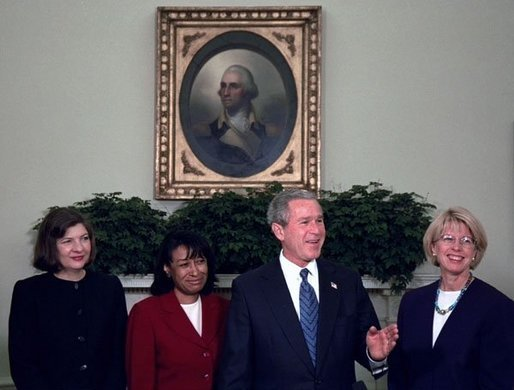
Brown with President George W. Bush, Priscilla Owen, and Carolyn Kuhl in 2003

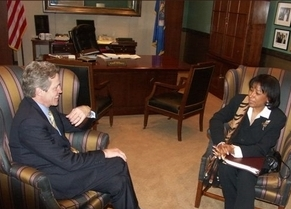
Brown meeting with Senator Norm Coleman in 2005 prior to her confirmation

Brown was nominated by President George W. Bush to the U.S. Court of Appeals for the District of Columbia Circuit on July 25, 2003 to fill the seat vacated by Stephen F. Williams.

The Senate Judiciary Committee held a hearing on her nomination on October 22. After her name had passed out of committee and had been sent to the full Senate, there was a failed cloture vote on her nomination on November 14, 2003. Brown's nomination was returned to the President under the standing rules of the Senate when the 108th United States Congress adjourned.

Bush renominated Brown on February 14, 2005, early in the first session of the 109th United States Congress. On April 21, 2005, the Senate Judiciary Committee again endorsed Brown and referred her name to the full Senate. On May 23, Senator John McCain brokered an agreement between seven Republican and seven Democratic U.S. Senators, the Gang of 14 deal, to ensure an up-or-down vote on Brown and several other stalled Bush nominees.

The Leadership Conference on Civil and Human Rights opposed her nomination to the court based on her record on the California Supreme Court where she exhibited "a strong, persistent, and disturbing hostility toward affirmative action, civil rights, the rights of individuals with disabilities, workers' rights, and the fairness of the criminal justice system."

Democrats blocked Brown's confirmation because they saw her as a "conservative judicial activist who ignores the law in favor of her own political views", "one of President Bush's most ideological and extreme judicial nominees", and a "jurist who supported limits on abortion rights and corporate liability and opposed affirmative action." On June 8, freshman Senator Barack Obama, in a speech on the floor of the U.S. Senate, characterized her judicial activism as social darwinism. He said:

Justice Scalia says that, generally speaking, "the legislature has the power to make laws and the judiciary should only interpret the laws that are made or are explicitly in the Constitution." That is not Justice Brown's philosophy. It is simply intellectually dishonest and logically incoherent to suggest that somehow the Constitution recognizes an unlimited right to do what you want with your private property and yet does not recognize a right to privacy that would forbid the Government from intruding in your bedroom. Yet that seems to be the manner in which Justice Brown would interpret our most cherished document.

Brown's nomination to the Court of Appeals was confirmed on June 8, 2005 by a 56–43 vote, after 14 senators stuck a deal to avoid filibustering judicial nominees except in "extraordinary circumstances". She received her commission on June 10, 2005. She began hearing federal cases on September 8, 2005. Brown retired from the U.S. Court of Appeals for the D.C. Circuit on August 31, 2017.

=== Tenure ===
One month into Brown's tenure she was reportedly considered as one of 13 potential nominees to replace retiring Justice Sandra Day O'Connor on the United States Supreme Court. The potential candidates included John G. Roberts, who was initially chosen by Bush but instead nominated for the seat of Chief Justice William Rehnquist who died unexpectedly, and Samuel Alito, who was then nominated for O'Connor's seat. In July 2005, Senator Joe Biden appeared on Face the Nation, and said a filibuster to prevent Brown from replacing O'Connor was more likely than if she were nominated to replace a more conservative justice, like Rehnquist.

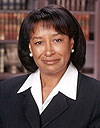
Official portrait of Brown as a federal judge, c. 2006

Brown's dissenting opinion in Omar v. Harvey sets forth her judicial outlook on the constitutional balance of powers. The United States Court of Appeals for the D.C. Circuit upheld an injunction that forbade the U.S. military to transfer Shawqi Ahmad Omar, a suspected insurgent, out of U.S. custody while his habeas corpus suit was pending. Brown's dissent took the view that the majority was trespassing on the Executive Branch's authority:

Summarizing its position, the majority declares: "The United States may certainly share information with other sovereigns ..., but it may not do so in a way that converts Omar's 'release' into a transfer that violates a court order." This is a striking conclusion. The majority in effect holds that, in the proper circumstance, a single unelected district court judge can enjoin the United States military from sharing information with an allied foreign sovereign in a war zone and may do so with the deliberate purpose of foiling the efforts of the foreign sovereign to make an arrest on its own soil, in effect secreting a fugitive to prevent his capture. The trespass on Executive authority could hardly be clearer.

In 2012, she wrote a concurring opinion for the case Hettinga v. United States in which she severely criticized the dominant post-Lochner approach in the U.S. judiciary, that laws involving economic policy deserve "a strong presumption of validity."

In June 2017, Brown wrote for a unanimous circuit panel finding that the next friend of Yemenis killed in a U.S. drone strike could not sue under the Torture Victims Protection Act nor the Alien Tort Statute because the attack was not justiciable. However she wrote a separate concurring opinion that criticized this lack of oversight, which is barred by precedent, concluding, "The political question doctrine, and the state secrets privilege confer such deference to the Executive in the foreign relations arena that the Judiciary has no part to play. These doctrines may be deeply flawed."

In August 2017, Brown partially dissented when the court found that the Military Extraterritorial Jurisdiction Act authorized the prosecution of the Nisour Square massacre killers.

== Post-retirement (2017–present) ==
In November 2018, President Donald Trump reportedly considered nominating Brown for U.S. Attorney General after the resignation of Jeff Sessions. Trump appointed Matthew Whitaker acting U.S. Attorney General before nominating William Barr to the position in December 2018.

In 2019, Brown held the position of jurist-in-residence, funded by a grant from the Hugh and Hazel Darling Foundation, at University of California Berkeley School of Law, co-teaching a workshop class with John Yoo and Steven F. Hayward.

In November 2021, she headlined and gave an address on Cancelling Cancel Culture at a University of California, Berkeley event co-hosted with the Federalist Society and the Pacific Research Institute.

As of November 2021, Brown was on the Boards of Regents of Pepperdine University and the University of the Pacific and on the Board of Advisors of the New Civil Liberties Alliance, a conservative-libertarian law firm opposed to "the administrative state".

As of February 2022, the University of California Berkeley School of Law listed her as a lecturer.

== Affiliations ==
Brown is affiliated with the Woodson Center, Federalist Society, the American Judges Association, and the American Judicature Society.

== Political views ==
Brown shared her family's liberal Democratic views but later became more conservative. She has been critical of affirmative action and abortion rights. In People v. Robert Young, 34 Cal. 4th 1149, 1237, (2005), Brown, ignoring prior precedent set by the California Supreme Court in 1985, argued that Black women should not be considered as a "cognizable group" and that prosecutors could therefore "use preemptory [sic] challenges to exclude jurors solely on the basis that they are black women."

Her political beliefs have been expressed in speeches, notably one delivered to the University of Chicago Law School Federalist Society in 2000. Brown's speech cited Ayn Rand and lamented the triumph of "the collectivist impulse" in which capitalism receives "contemptuous tolerance but only for its capacity to feed the insatiable maw of socialism." Brown argued that "where government moves in, community retreats, civil society disintegrates, and our ability to control our own destiny atrophies" and suggested that the ultimate result for the United States has been a "debased, debauched culture which finds moral depravity entertaining and virtue contemptible." She has also compared liberal democracy to slavery by the government.

Her remarks gained particular attention for her thesis that the 1937 court decisions, such as West Coast Hotel Co. v. Parrish, upholding minimum-wage laws and other New Deal legislation, marked "the triumph of our own socialist revolution" and was the culmination of "a particularly skewed view of human nature" that could be "traced from the Enlightenment, through the Terror, to Marx and Engels, to the Revolutions of 1917 and 1937." She called instead for a return to Lochnerism, the pre-1937 view that the US Constitution severely limits federal and state power to enact economic regulations. In an exegesis of Brown's speech that was largely responsible for bringing it to public attention during her confirmation process in 2005, legal-affairs analyst Stuart Taylor Jr. noted, "Almost all modern constitutional scholars have rejected Lochnerism as 'the quintessence of judicial usurpation of power'" and cited "leading conservatives — including Justice Antonin Scalia, Senator Orrin Hatch, and former Attorney General Edwin Meese, as well as [Robert] Bork."

In the same speech, Brown explained that the Federalist Society had been described as a "rare bastion (nay beacon) of conservative and libertarian thought" in her invitation to speak, and that the "latter notion [had] made your invitation well-nigh irresistible." She also gave hints of her philosophical foundations, approvingly quoting descriptions of private property as "the guardian of every other right" and collectivism as "slavery to the tribe". She also described government as a "leviathan [that] will continue to lumber along, picking up ballast and momentum, crushing everything in its path."

== Personal life ==
Janice Rogers Brown had one son, Nathan Allen Brown, born in 1971, with her first husband, Allen E. Brown Sr., who died of cancer in 1988. Three years later, she married jazz electric bassist Dewey Parker.

== See also ==
- List of African-American federal judges
- List of African-American jurists
- List of first women lawyers and judges in California
- List of justices of the Supreme Court of California
- George W. Bush judicial appointment controversies
- George W. Bush Supreme Court candidates
- Gang of 14
- Black conservatism in the United States

== Videos ==
- Appearances on C-SPAN
- Video of Judge Brown's Investiture

Legal offices
Preceded by Ronald M. George	Associate Justice of the California Supreme Court; 1996–2005	Succeeded by Carol Corrigan
Preceded by Stephen F. Williams	Judge of the United States Court of Appeals for the District of Columbia Circuit; 2005–2017	Succeeded by Gregory G. Katsas
