= 1994 Oklahoma elections =

- November 8, 1994

The 1994 Oklahoma state elections were held on November 8, 1994. The primary election was held on July 26. The runoff primary election was held on August 23. The 1994 elections marked the first time in state history that Republicans held a majority of the state-wide elected offices: 7 out of 11. It also marked the first time Republicans controlled both the offices of Governor and Lieutenant Governor at the same time.

== Overview ==
Executive Branch Before Election

| Office | Current Officer | Party |
|---|---|---|
| Governor | David Walters | Democratic |
| Lieutenant Governor | Jack Mildren | Democratic |
| State Auditor and Inspector | Clifton Scott | Democratic |
| Attorney General | Susan B. Loving | Democratic |
| State Treasurer | Claudette Henry | Republican |
| State School Superintendent | Sandy Garrett | Democratic |
| Labor Commissioner | Dave Renfro | Democratic |
| Insurance Commissioner | Cathy Weatherford | Democratic |
| Corporation Commissioner | Bob Anthony | Republican |

Legislature Before Election

| House | Democrats | Republicans |
|---|---|---|
| Oklahoma Senate | 37 | 11 |
| Oklahoma House of Representatives | 68 | 33 |

Executive Branch After Election

| Office | Current Officer | Party |
|---|---|---|
| Governor | Frank Keating | Republican |
| Lieutenant Governor | Mary Fallin | Republican |
| State Auditor and Inspector | Clifton Scott | Democratic |
| Attorney General | Drew Edmondson | Democratic |
| State Treasurer | Robert Butkin | Democratic |
| State School Superintendent | Sandy Garrett | Democratic |
| Labor Commissioner | Brenda Reneau | Republican |
| Insurance Commissioner | John P. Crawford | Republican |
| Corporation Commissioner | Bob Anthony | Republican |

Legislature After Election

| House | Democrats | Republicans |
|---|---|---|
| Oklahoma Senate | 35 | 13 |
| Oklahoma House of Representatives | 65 | 36 |

== See also ==
- 1994 Oklahoma gubernatorial election
- Government of Oklahoma
- Oklahoma House of Representatives
- Oklahoma Senate
- Politics of Oklahoma
- Oklahoma's congressional districts
