= Robert S. Kerr III =

American politician

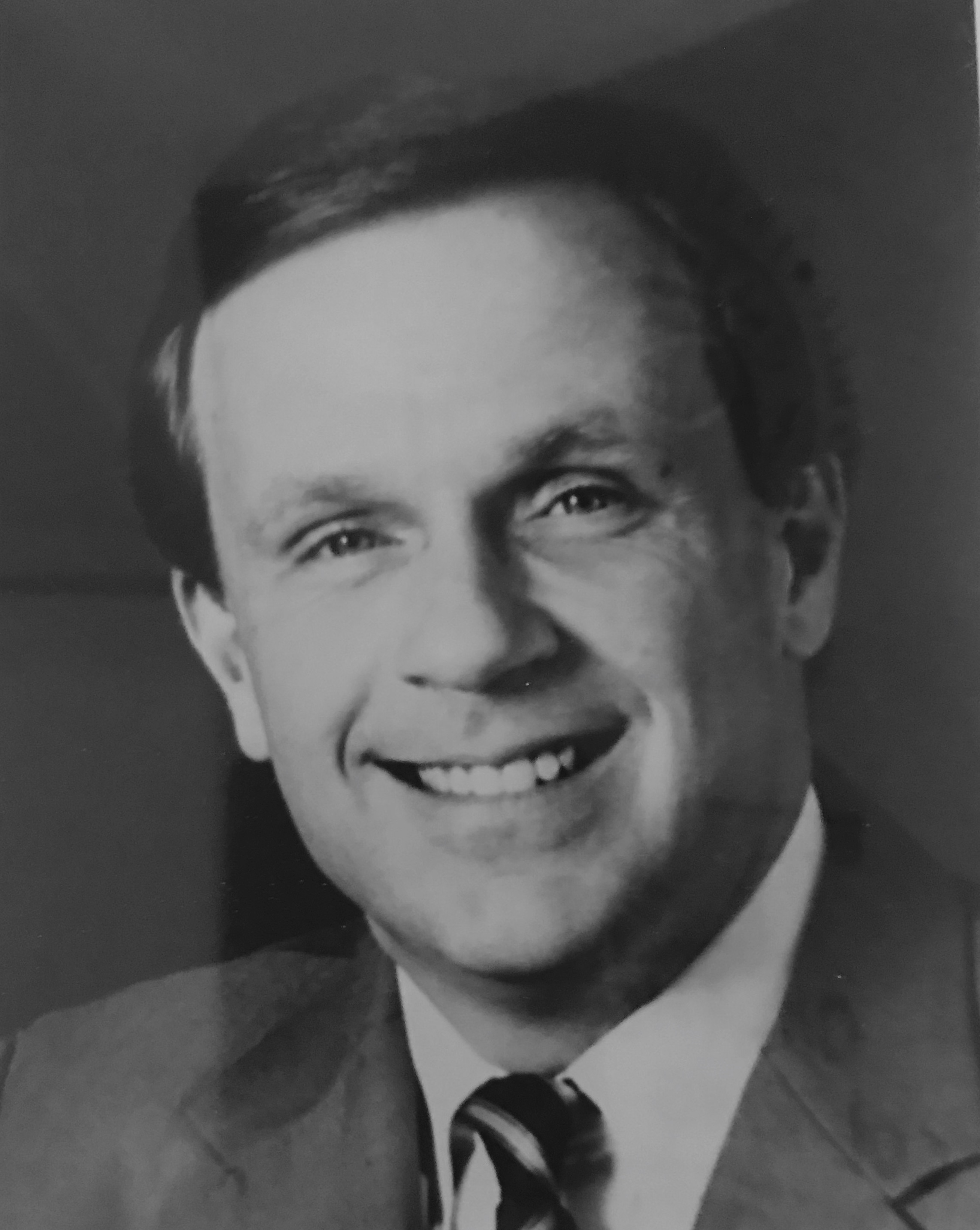

12th Lieutenant Governor of Oklahoma
- In office January 12, 1987 – January 14, 1991
- Governor: Henry Bellmon
- Preceded by: Spencer Bernard
- Succeeded by: Jack Mildren

Member of the Oklahoma House of Representatives from the 86th district
- In office 1978–1980
- Preceded by: Rick Stahl
- Succeeded by: David Hood

Personal details
- Born: Robert Samuel Kerr III; October 12, 1950 (age 75) Oklahoma City, Oklahoma, U.S.
- Party: Democratic
- Relatives: Robert S. Kerr (grandfather)

Robert Samuel Kerr III (born October 12, 1950) is an American Democratic politician from the U.S. state of Oklahoma. He served as a member of the Oklahoma House of Representatives from the 86th district from 1978 to 1980, 12th lieutenant governor of Oklahoma from 1987 to 1991, and as chair of the Oklahoma Democratic Party. He ran unsuccessfully for Oklahoma's 3rd Congressional district seat, losing in the Democratic Party primary to State Representative William K. Brewster, he was endorsed by Carl Albert.

Kerr was raised in southeastern Oklahoma. He is the grandson of U.S. Senator Robert S. Kerr. As Lieutenant Governor of Oklahoma, he served alongside Governor Henry Bellmon.

Kerr endorsed Bill Bradley for President of the United States in 2000, and in 2004 he endorsed Dick Gephardt.

== Electoral history ==
1978 Oklahoma House District 86 Democratic Primary Election
Candidates	Party	Votes	%
Robert S. "Bob" Kerr III	Democratic Party	1,173	47.36%
Jack Hachmeister	Democratic Party	642	25.92%
Elaine Bryant	Democratic Party	354	14.30%
I.C. Claud Nancy	Democratic Party	242	9.76%
Jess Kirby	Democratic Party	66	2.66%
Total Votes		2,477	100%

1978 Oklahoma House District 86 Election
Candidates	Party	Votes	%
Robert S. "Bob" Kerr III	Democratic Party	3,237	52.43%
George Barnes	Republican Party	2,937	47.57%
Total Votes		6,174	100%

1980 Oklahoma House District 86 Election
Candidates	Party	Votes	%
Rick Stahl	Republican Party	4,383	55.77%
Robert S. "Bob" Kerr III	Democratic Party	3,477	44.23%
Total Votes		7,860	100%

1986 Oklahoma Democratic Lieutenant Governor Primary Election
Candidates	Party	Votes	%
Robert S. Kerr III	Democratic Party	157,738	31.20%
Cleta Mitchell	Democratic Party	152,096	30.09%
Spencer T Bernard (Incumbent)	Democratic Party	113,844	22.52%
Pete Reed	Democratic Party	38,185	7.55%
Bill Dickerson	Democratic Party	26,390	5.22%
Roger Streetman	Democratic Party	17,271	3.42%
Total Votes		505,524	100%

1986 Oklahoma Democratic Lieutenant Governor Primary Runoff Election
Candidates	Party	Votes	%
Robert S. Kerr III	Democratic Party	246,391	53.21%
Cleta Mitchell	Democratic Party	216,671	46.79%
Total Votes		463,062	100%

1986 Oklahoma Lieutenant Governor Election
Candidates	Party	Votes	%
Robert S. Kerr III	Democratic Party	469,781	52.47%
Tim Leonard	Republican Party	425,540	47.53%
Total Votes		895,321	100%

1990 Oklahoma District 3 Democratic Primary House Election
Candidates	Party	Votes	%
Bill Brewster	Democratic Party	67,069	50.87%
Robert S. Kerr III	Democratic Party	54,471	41.31%
Will Robison	Democratic Party	8,141	6.17%
Eugene Poling	Democratic Party	2,173	1.65%
Total Votes		131,854	100%

Party political offices
Preceded by Spencer Bernard	Democratic nominee for Lieutenant Governor of Oklahoma; 1986	Succeeded by Jack Mildren
Political offices
Preceded by Spencer Bernard	Lieutenant Governor of Oklahoma; 1987–1991	Succeeded by Jack Mildren
