= 1994 Central African constitutional referendum =

- 28 December 1994

Results
Choice	Votes	%
Yes	460,407	82.70%
No	96,337	17.30%
Valid votes	556,744	99.23%
Invalid or blank votes	4,340	0.77%
Total votes	561,084	100.00%
Registered voters/turnout	1,247,290	44.98%

A constitutional referendum was held in the Central African Republic on 28 December 1994. The new constitution would make the country a presidential republic with a unicameral National Assembly and a Prime Minister accountable to both the President and the National Assembly. It was approved by 82.7% of voters with a 45% turnout.

== Results ==
Choice	Votes	%
For	460,407	82.7
Against	96,337	17.3
Invalid/blank votes	4,340	–
Total	561,084	100
Registered voters/turnout	1,247,290	44.98
Source: African Elections Database
