= August 1994 Uruguayan constitutional referendum =

28 August 1994

Results
Choice	Votes	%
Yes	559,321	31.08%
No	1,240,059	68.92%
Valid votes	1,799,380	91.58%
Invalid or blank votes	165,391	8.42%
Total votes	1,964,771	100.00%
Registered voters/turnout	2,278,375	86.24%

A constitutional referendum was held in Uruguay on 28 August 1994. The proposals were rejected by 69% of voters.

== Proposals ==
The proposed amendments to the constitution were put forward by the General Assembly, passing in the Chamber of Deputies on 11 May with 62 of the 99 members voting in favour, and in the Senate on 8 July with 22 of the 30 members voting in favour. The amendments would split the vote for president, parliament and governors, set wages for councillors and the method of payment of pensions.

== Results ==
Choice	Votes	%
For	559,321	31.08
Against	1,240,059	68.92
Unevaluated votes	110,711	–
Invalid/blank votes	54,680	–
Total	1,964,771	100
Registered voters/turnout	2,278,375	86.23
Source: Direct Democracy

Unevaluated votes were those cast by voters outside of their local polling station. They would have been examined after a court had decided on their validity, but as the result was already clear, they were not counted.
