= 1994 California Courts of Appeal election =

The 1994 California Courts of Appeal election was held November 8, 1994. The judges of the California Courts of Appeal are either approved to remain in their seat or rejected by the voters. All of the judges kept their seats.

== Results ==
Final results from the California Secretary of State:

=== District 1 ===
==== Division 1 ====
Presiding Justice Gary E. Strankman
| Vote on retention | Votes | % |
|---|---|---|
| Yes | 513,504 | 56.71% |
| No | 398,807 | 44.04% |
| Invalid or blank votes | 800,814 | 46.75% |
| Totals | 1,715,125 | 100.00% |
| Voter turnout | % | |

Associate Justice Robert L. Dossee
| Vote on retention | Votes | % |
|---|---|---|
| Yes | 507,790 | 56.08% |
| No | 397,686 | 43.92% |
| Invalid or blank votes | 807,649 | 47.14% |
| Totals | 1,715,125 | 100.00% |
| Voter turnout | % | |

==== Division 2 ====
Associate Justice Paul R. Haerle
| Vote on retention | Votes | % |
|---|---|---|
| Yes | 494,590 | 55.32% |
| No | 399,403 | 44.68% |
| Invalid or blank votes | 819,132 | 47.82% |
| Totals | 1,715,125 | 100.00% |
| Voter turnout | % | |

Associate Justice Michael J. Phelan
| Vote on retention | Votes | % |
|---|---|---|
| Yes | 624,390 | 68.62% |
| No | 285,587 | 31.38% |
| Invalid or blank votes | 803,148 | 46.88% |
| Totals | 1,715,125 | 100.00% |
| Voter turnout | % | |

Associate Justice Jerry Smith
| Vote on retention | Votes | % |
|---|---|---|
| Yes | 514,117 | 56.49% |
| No | 395,943 | 43.51% |
| Invalid or blank votes | 803,065 | 46.88% |
| Totals | 1,715,125 | 100.00% |
| Voter turnout | % | |

==== Division 3 ====
Presiding Justice Ming Chin
| Vote on retention | Votes | % |
|---|---|---|
| Yes | 530,120 | 56.75% |
| No | 403,987 | 43.25% |
| Invalid or blank votes | 779,018 | 45.47% |
| Totals | 1,715,125 | 100.00% |
| Voter turnout | % | |

Associate Justice Carol A. Corrigan
| Vote on retention | Votes | % |
|---|---|---|
| Yes | 669,213 | 71.48% |
| No | 267,008 | 28.52% |
| Invalid or blank votes | 776,904 | 45.35% |
| Totals | 1,715,125 | 100.00% |
| Voter turnout | % | |

==== Division 4 ====
Associate Justice James F. Perley, Jr.
| Vote on retention | Votes | % |
|---|---|---|
| Yes | 502,366 | 55.94% |
| No | 395,660 | 44.06% |
| Invalid or blank votes | 815,099 | 47.58% |
| Totals | 1,715,125 | 100.00% |
| Voter turnout | % | |

Associate Justice Marc Poché
| Vote on retention | Votes | % |
|---|---|---|
| Yes | 490,688 | 54.15% |
| No | 415,424 | 45.85% |
| Invalid or blank votes | 807,013 | 47.11% |
| Totals | 1,715,125 | 100.00% |
| Voter turnout | % | |

Associate Justice Timothy A. Reardon
| Vote on retention | Votes | % |
|---|---|---|
| Yes | 654,135 | 71.14% |
| No | 265,375 | 28.86% |
| Invalid or blank votes | 793,615 | 46.33% |
| Totals | 1,715,125 | 100.00% |
| Voter turnout | % | |

==== Division 5 ====
Presiding Justice John Clinton Peterson
| Vote on retention | Votes | % |
|---|---|---|
| Yes | 512,132 | 57.01% |
| No | 386,262 | 42.99% |
| Invalid or blank votes | 814,731 | 47.56% |
| Totals | 1,715,125 | 100.00% |
| Voter turnout | % | |

=== District 2 ===
==== Division 1 ====
Associate Justice William A. Masterson
| Vote on retention | Votes | % |
|---|---|---|
| Yes | 983,136 | 62.73% |
| No | 584,159 | 37.27% |
| Invalid or blank votes | 1,024,903 | 39.54% |
| Totals | 2,592,288 | 100.00% |
| Voter turnout | % | |

Associate Justice Reuben A. Ortega
| Vote on retention | Votes | % |
|---|---|---|
| Yes | 972,462 | 61.52% |
| No | 608,383 | 38.48% |
| Invalid or blank votes | 1,011,353 | 39.02% |
| Totals | 2,592,288 | 100.00% |
| Voter turnout | % | |

==== Division 2 ====
Associate Justice Roger W. Boren
| Vote on retention | Votes | % |
|---|---|---|
| Yes | 938,711 | 61.10% |
| No | 597,605 | 38.90% |
| Invalid or blank votes | 1,055,882 | 40.73% |
| Totals | 2,592,288 | 100.00% |
| Voter turnout | % | |

Associate Justice Michael G. Nott
| Vote on retention | Votes | % |
|---|---|---|
| Yes | 928,227 | 60.45% |
| No | 607,299 | 39.55% |
| Invalid or blank votes | 1,056,672 | 40.76% |
| Totals | 2,592,288 | 100.00% |
| Voter turnout | % | |

==== Division 3 ====
Associate Justice Richard D. Aldrich
| Vote on retention | Votes | % |
|---|---|---|
| Yes | 967,522 | 62.75% |
| No | 574,436 | 37.25% |
| Invalid or blank votes | 1,050,240 | 40.52% |
| Totals | 2,592,288 | 100.00% |
| Voter turnout | % | |

Associate Justice Patti S. Kitching
| Vote on retention | Votes | % |
|---|---|---|
| Yes | 962,239 | 61.98% |
| No | 590,375 | 38.02% |
| Invalid or blank votes | 1,039,584 | 40.10% |
| Totals | 2,592,288 | 100.00% |
| Voter turnout | % | |

==== Division 4 ====
Presiding Justice Arleigh Woods
| Vote on retention | Votes | % |
|---|---|---|
| Yes | 933,810 | 60.68% |
| No | 605,032 | 39.32% |
| Invalid or blank votes | 1,053,356 | 40.64% |
| Totals | 2,592,288 | 100.00% |
| Voter turnout | % | |

Associate Justice Norman L. Epstein
| Vote on retention | Votes | % |
|---|---|---|
| Yes | 936,656 | 59.69% |
| No | 632,492 | 40.31 |
| Invalid or blank votes | 1,023,050 | 39.47% |
| Totals | 2,592,288 | 100.00% |
| Voter turnout | % | |

Associate Justice J. Gary Hastings
| Vote on retention | Votes | % |
|---|---|---|
| Yes | 1,039,078 | 67.17% |
| No | 507,806 | 32.83% |
| Invalid or blank votes | 1,045,314 | 40.33% |
| Totals | 2,592,288 | 100.00% |
| Voter turnout | % | |

Associate Justice Charles S. Vogel
| Vote on retention | Votes | % |
|---|---|---|
| Yes | 1,040,314 | 67.18% |
| No | 508,140 | 32.82% |
| Invalid or blank votes | 1,043,744 | 40.26% |
| Totals | 2,592,288 | 100.00% |
| Voter turnout | % | |

==== Division 5 ====
Associate Justice Orville "Jack" Armstrong
| Vote on retention | Votes | % |
|---|---|---|
| Yes | 1,029,584 | 67.52% |
| No | 495,256 | 32.48% |
| Invalid or blank votes | 1,067,358 | 41.18% |
| Totals | 2,592,288 | 100.00% |
| Voter turnout | % | |

Associate Margaret A. Grignon
| Vote on retention | Votes | % |
|---|---|---|
| Yes | 947,463 | 62.17% |
| No | 576,527 | 37.83% |
| Invalid or blank votes | 1,068,208 | 41.21% |
| Totals | 2,592,288 | 100.00% |
| Voter turnout | % | |

Associate Justice Ramona Godoy Perez
| Vote on retention | Votes | % |
|---|---|---|
| Yes | 949,403 | 61.19% |
| No | 602,124 | 38.81% |
| Invalid or blank votes | 1,040,671 | 40.15% |
| Totals | 2,592,288 | 100.00% |
| Voter turnout | % | |

==== Division 6 ====
Presiding Justice Steven J. Stone
| Vote on retention | Votes | % |
|---|---|---|
| Yes | 924,623 | 61.03% |
| No | 590,487 | 38.97% |
| Invalid or blank votes | 1,077,088 | 41.55% |
| Totals | 2,592,288 | 100.00% |
| Voter turnout | % | |

Associate Justice Kenneth R. Yegan
| Vote on retention | Votes | % |
|---|---|---|
| Yes | 959,052 | 63.53% |
| No | 550,613 | 36.47% |
| Invalid or blank votes | 1,082,533 | 41.76% |
| Totals | 2,592,288 | 100.00% |
| Voter turnout | % | |

==== Division 7 ====
Associate Justice Fred Woods
| Vote on retention | Votes | % |
|---|---|---|
| Yes | 953,214 | 62.54% |
| No | 570,867 | 37.46% |
| Invalid or blank votes | 1,068,117 | 41.21% |
| Totals | 2,592,288 | 100.00% |
| Voter turnout | % | |

=== District 3 ===
Associate Justice Coleman A. Blease
| Vote on retention | Votes | % |
|---|---|---|
| Yes | 343,469 | 51.95% |
| No | 317,654 | 48.05% |
| Invalid or blank votes | 337,099 | 33.77% |
| Totals | 998,222 | 100.00% |
| Voter turnout | % | |

Associate Justice Fred K. Morrison
| Vote on retention | Votes | % |
|---|---|---|
| Yes | 375,189 | 56.11% |
| No | 293,446 | 43.89% |
| Invalid or blank votes | 329,587 | 33.02% |
| Totals | 998,222 | 100.00% |
| Voter turnout | % | |

Associate Justice George Nicholson
| Vote on retention | Votes | % |
|---|---|---|
| Yes | 446,532 | 67.00% |
| No | 219,957 | 33.00% |
| Invalid or blank votes | 331,733 | 33.23% |
| Totals | 998,222 | 100.00% |
| Voter turnout | % | |

=== District 4 ===
==== Division 1 ====
Associate Justice Patricia D. Benke
| Vote on retention | Votes | % |
|---|---|---|
| Yes | 845,717 | 57.05% |
| No | 636,632 | 42.95% |
| Invalid or blank votes | 811,546 | 35.38% |
| Totals | 2,293,895 | 100.00% |
| Voter turnout | % | |

Associate Justice Judith L. Haller
| Vote on retention | Votes | % |
|---|---|---|
| Yes | 821,039 | 56.26% |
| No | 638,445 | 43.74% |
| Invalid or blank votes | 834,411 | 36.38% |
| Totals | 2,293,895 | 100.00% |
| Voter turnout | % | |

Associate Justice Richard D. Huffman
| Vote on retention | Votes | % |
|---|---|---|
| Yes | 842,730 | 57.36% |
| No | 626,365 | 42.64% |
| Invalid or blank votes | 824,800 | 35.96% |
| Totals | 2,293,895 | 100.00% |
| Voter turnout | % | |

Associate Justice Don R. Work
| Vote on retention | Votes | % |
|---|---|---|
| Yes | 785,142 | 53.80% |
| No | 674,130 | 46.20% |
| Invalid or blank votes | 834,623 | 36.38% |
| Totals | 2,293,895 | 100.00% |
| Voter turnout | % | |

==== Division 2 ====
Presiding Justice Manuel A. Ramirez
| Vote on retention | Votes | % |
|---|---|---|
| Yes | 918,548 | 62.32% |
| No | 555,378 | 37.68% |
| Invalid or blank votes | 819,969 | 35.75% |
| Totals | 2,293,895 | 100.00% |
| Voter turnout | % | |

Associate Justice Howard M. Dabney
| Vote on retention | Votes | % |
|---|---|---|
| Yes | 815,611 | 56.06% |
| No | 639,266 | 43.94% |
| Invalid or blank votes | 839,018 | 36.58% |
| Totals | 2,293,895 | 100.00% |
| Voter turnout | % | |

Associate Justice Art W. McKinster
| Vote on retention | Votes | % |
|---|---|---|
| Yes | 817,004 | 56.20% |
| No | 636,716 | 43.80% |
| Invalid or blank votes | 840,175 | 36.63% |
| Totals | 2,293,895 | 100.00% |
| Voter turnout | % | |

Associate Justice Betty Ann Richli
| Vote on retention | Votes | % |
|---|---|---|
| Yes | 823,487 | 56.03% |
| No | 646,263 | 43.97% |
| Invalid or blank votes | 824,145 | 35.93% |
| Totals | 2,293,895 | 100.00% |
| Voter turnout | % | |

==== Division 3 ====
Associate Justice Sheila Prell Sonenshine
| Vote on retention | Votes | % |
|---|---|---|
| Yes | 788,806 | 54.58% |
| No | 656,481 | 45.42% |
| Invalid or blank votes | 848,608 | 36.99% |
| Totals | 2,293,895 | 100.00% |
| Voter turnout | % | |

=== District 5 ===
Associate Justice James A. Ardaiz
| Vote on retention | Votes | % |
|---|---|---|
| Yes | 253,811 | 54.32% |
| No | 213,480 | 45.68% |
| Invalid or blank votes | 174,797 | 27.22% |
| Totals | 642,088 | 100.00% |
| Voter turnout | % | |

Associate Justice Timothy S. Buckley
| Vote on retention | Votes | % |
|---|---|---|
| Yes | 206,374 | 56.26% |
| No | 202,414 | 43.74% |
| Invalid or blank votes | 179,300 | 27.92% |
| Totals | 642,088 | 100.00% |
| Voter turnout | % | |

Associate Justice Thomas A. Harris
| Vote on retention | Votes | % |
|---|---|---|
| Yes | 257,146 | 55.71% |
| No | 204,444 | 44.29% |
| Invalid or blank votes | 180,498 | 28.11% |
| Totals | 642,088 | 100.00% |
| Voter turnout | % | |

=== District 6 ===
Presiding Justice Christopher C. Cottle
| Vote on retention | Votes | % |
|---|---|---|
| Yes | 291,549 | 73.08% |
| No | 107,415 | 26.92% |
| Invalid or blank votes | 262,144 | 39.65% |
| Totals | 661,108 | 100.00% |
| Voter turnout | % | |

Presiding Justice Nathan D. Mihara
| Vote on retention | Votes | % |
|---|---|---|
| Yes | 228,599 | 57.87% |
| No | 166,439 | 42.13% |
| Invalid or blank votes | 266,070 | 40.25% |
| Totals | 661,108 | 100.00% |
| Voter turnout | % | |

Presiding Justice William M. Wunderlich
| Vote on retention | Votes | % |
|---|---|---|
| Yes | 247,910 | 63.31% |
| No | 143,645 | 36.69% |
| Invalid or blank votes | 269,553 | 40.77% |
| Totals | 661,108 | 100.00% |
| Voter turnout | % | |
