= 1994 California Superintendent of Public Instruction election =

- November 8, 1994
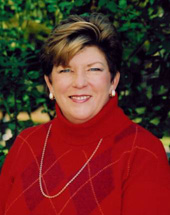

Nominee	Delaine Eastin	Maureen DiMarco	Wilbert Smith
Party	Democratic	Nonpartisan	Nonpartisan
First round vote	879,111	548,046	474,025
First round percentage	22.67%	14.13%	12.23%
Runoff vote	3,892,681	3,108,221	Eliminated
Runoff percentage	55.60%	44.40%	Eliminated
Nominee	Carol S. Koppel	Gloria Marra Tuchman	Joseph D. Carrabino
Party	Nonpartisan	Nonpartisan	Nonpartisan
First round vote	381,841	312,562	285,766
First round percentage	9.85%	8.06%	7.37%
Runoff vote	Eliminated	Eliminated	Eliminated
Runoff percentage	Eliminated	Eliminated	Eliminated
Nominee	Robert Stewart	Hal Rice
Party	Nonpartisan	Nonpartisan
First round vote	253,397	251,685
First round percentage	6.54%	6.49%
Runoff vote	Eliminated	Eliminated
Runoff percentage	Eliminated	Eliminated

Map key
Eastin:
10–20%
20–30%
30–40%
40–50%
50–60%
60–70%
70–80%
DiMarco:
10–20%
50–60%
60–70%
Koppel:
10–20%
Smith:
10–20%
Tuchman:
10–20%
Stewart:
10–20%
SPI before election
Bill Honig
Nonpartisan
Elected SPI
Delaine Eastin
Democratic

The 1994 California Superintendent of Public Instruction election was held on June 7, 1994, to elect the Superintendent of Public Instruction of California. The officially nonpartisan position is elected via a general election, with a runoff held if no candidate receives a majority of the vote. Delaine Eastin and Maureen DiMarco advanced to run the runoff, which was held on November 8, 1994 and won by Eastin.

== Runoff ==
=== Results ===
California Superintendent of Public Instruction election, 1994
Candidate	Votes	%
Delaine Eastin	3,892,681	55.60
Maureen DiMarco	3,108,221	44.40
Hal Rice (write-in)	20	0.00
Invalid or blank votes	1,899,714	21.34
Total votes	7,000,922	100.00
Turnout	{{{votes}}}	46.98%

=== Results by county ===
County	Eastin	Votes	DiMarco	Votes	Rice	Votes
Alameda	70.99%	238,980	29.01%	97,654	0.00%	0
San Francisco	70.61%	111,542	29.39%	46,418	0.00%	0
Santa Cruz	63.29%	43,872	36.71%	25,446	0.00%	0
San Mateo	62.75%	105,114	37.25%	62,392	0.00%	0
Mendocino	62.55%	15,002	37.45%	8,982	0.00%	0
San Luis Obispo	62.43%	45,956	37.57%	27,658	0.00%	0
Santa Barbara	62.26%	67,211	37.74%	40,732	0.00%	3
Contra Costa	61.15%	151,462	38.85%	96,245	0.00%	0
Santa Clara	60.88%	213,466	39.12%	137,167	0.00%	1
Marin	60.63%	50,025	39.37%	32,479	0.00%	0
Solano	59.77%	50,780	40.23%	34,179	0.00%	0
Sonoma	59.68%	78,106	40.32%	52,764	0.00%	0
Lake	59.10%	10,094	40.90%	6,986	0.00%	0
Napa	58.73%	20,804	41.27%	14,619	0.00%	0
Nevada	57.56%	17,904	42.44%	13,199	0.00%	0
Humboldt	57.52%	22,542	42.48%	16,645	0.00%	0
Stanislaus	57.18%	49,475	42.82%	37,050	0.00%	0
Yolo	57.02%	24,072	42.98%	18,142	0.00%	0
Los Angeles	56.10%	925,316	43.90%	724,071	0.00%	3
Tuolumne	55.84%	9,417	44.16%	7,446	0.00%	0
Sacramento	55.25%	159,757	44.75%	129,368	0.00%	2
Monterey	55.17%	42,078	44.83%	34,185	0.00%	1
Yuba	55.09%	6,847	44.91%	5,582	0.00%	0
Plumas	54.92%	4,039	45.08%	3,316	0.00%	0
San Joaquin	54.67%	61,609	45.33%	51,083	0.00%	0
Mono	54.66%	1,582	45.34%	1,312	0.00%	0
Lassen	53.99%	3,789	46.01%	3,229	0.00%	0
Ventura	53.84%	94,764	46.16%	81,262	0.00%	0
Alpine	53.62%	289	46.38%	250	0.00%	0
San Bernardino	53.52%	156,294	46.48%	135,746	0.00%	0
Sierra	53.43%	733	46.57%	639	0.00%	0
Modoc	52.81%	1,682	47.19%	1,503	0.00%	0
Mariposa	52.35%	3,265	47.65%	2,972	0.00%	0
San Benito	52.17%	5,273	47.83%	4,835	0.00%	0
Amador	51.81%	5,915	48.19%	5,501	0.00%	0
Calaveras	51.81%	7,122	48.19%	6,624	0.00%	0
Del Norte	51.40%	3,130	48.60%	2,959	0.00%	0
Placer	51.12%	31,703	48.88%	30,318	0.00%	0
San Diego	50.55%	300,616	49.45%	294,060	0.00%	2
El Dorado	50.55%	23,801	49.45%	23,287	0.00%	0
Tulare	50.43%	34,645	49.57%	34,054	0.00%	0
Sutter	50.10%	9,550	49.90%	9,512	0.00%	0
Trinity	49.88%	2,324	50.12%	2,335	0.00%	0
Riverside	49.64%	145,612	50.36%	147,696	0.00%	0
Orange	49.59%	296,160	50.41%	301,091	0.00%	3
Imperial	48.68%	9,455	51.32%	9,967	0.00%	0
Fresno	47.56%	70,729	52.44%	77,995	0.00%	5
Merced	46.90%	15,224	53.10%	17,236	0.00%	0
Inyo	46.53%	2,828	53.47%	3,250	0.00%	0
Siskiyou	45.55%	6,982	54.45%	8,345	0.00%	0
Madera	45.05%	10,475	54.95%	12,779	0.00%	0
Butte	44.54%	26,348	55.46%	32,811	0.00%	0
Kings	43.87%	8,631	56.13%	11,045	0.00%	0
Colusa	43.53%	1,885	56.47%	2,445	0.00%	0
Kern	42.42%	57,248	57.58%	77,707	0.00%	0
Shasta	42.21%	20,134	57.79%	27,565	0.00%	0
Tehama	41.34%	6,701	58.66%	9,507	0.00%	0
Glenn	33.66%	2,322	66.34%	4,576	0.00%	0

== See also ==
- California state elections, 1994
- State of California
- California Department of Education
