= Jack Gilbert Rentschler =

American politician

Member of the South Dakota House of Representatives
- In office 1991–1992

Personal details
- Born: April 28, 1931 (age 95) Clay City, Indiana, U.S.
- Party: Republican
- Spouse: Joyce Lavely (m. 1953)
- Education: Indiana State University

Jack Gilbert Rentschler (born April 28, 1931) is an American politician. He served as a Republican member of the South Dakota House of Representatives.

== Life and career ==
Rentschler was born in Clay City, Indiana. He attended Indiana State University.

Rentschler was owner of Rentschler's Truck Plaza.

Renschler served in the South Dakota House of Representatives from 1991 to 1992.
