= 1994 Kazakh local elections =

Local elections were held in Kazakhstan on 7 March 1994 for the first time to elect 5,935 members of the mäslihats (local assemblies). The mäslihat elections coincided with the legislative elections and the voter turnout was reported to be 73.52%.

== Background ==
During Soviet era prior to the changes of local governments, in which its representative bodies in Kazakhstan were the Soviet of People's Deputies of which the members were elected by citizens living in the Kazakh SSR on secret ballot for a five-year term.

Following the independence from the Soviet Union, things took a turn in Kazakhstan's local political structures. On 8 November 1993, the Alatau District Soviet of People's Deputies of the city of Almaty made an unprecedented decision on self-dissolution. The members of the District Council then appealed to the members of the Supreme Soviet and other People's Deputies Soviets to dissolve themselves due to "people's will". The following day the members of Lenin and Oktyabr District Soviets resigned their powers and then was followed by the Auezov and Frunzensky Didtricts of Almaty.

On 8 December 1993, the Supreme Soviet adopted a law which called for elections of local legislatures for 7 March 1994, which would be held subsequently with the Supreme Council elections, and on the following day on 9 December, the powers of the local Soviet of People's Deputies were dissolved nationwide.

On 10 December, the bill "On local representative and executive bodies of the Republic of Kazakhstan" was passed by the Supreme Soviet which brought changes in the structure of local representative bodies with Soviet of People's Deputies being renamed to mäslihats (local assemblies).

== Electoral system ==
The members of mäslihats (local assemblies) were elected by population living in administrative-territorial units for a five-year term on basis of secret ballot through first-past-the-post system. An election was considered to be legitimate if more than 50% of registered voters cast ballots in an electoral district. enrolled in voter lists, cast ballots.

A member of the mäslihat was required to be 20 years old with an active suffrage experience.

== Conduct ==
Mäslihat candidates were nominated by themselves or public associations of which were required to collect signatures by the 3% of people living in their constituency.

A total of 13,744 candidates in 5,935 constituencies were nominated for mäslihats of all levels in which were:

- 9,710 to district mäslihats
- 2,322 to city mäslihats
- 1,712 to regional mäslihats

Registration of candidates by the Central Election Commission (OSK) took place from 26 January 1994 and was finished on 8 February 1994, just one month before election date.

== Results ==
According to results published by the Central Election Commission (OSK), out of 9,561,534 registered voters, 73.52% or 7,030,050 cast their votes with number of blank or invalid votes being 12,593.

5,897 of the 5,935 total mäslihat members were elected. As a result of low turnout rate in 38 constituencies, by-elections were held to fill in the seats.
