= 1994 Kyrgyz constitutional referendum =

22 October 1994

Do you approve through referenda to decide on changes to the Constitution, laws and other important issues of political life?
Yes	89.03%
No	10.97%

Do you approve of the introduction of a bicameral parliament?
Yes	88.11%
No	11.89%

A constitutional referendum was held in Kyrgyzstan on 22 October 1994. Voters were asked questions on two topics:

1. Whether they approved of using referendums to decide on amendments to the constitution, laws and other important questions of political life.
2. Whether they approved of the introduction of a bicameral parliament.

Both were approved by almost 90% of voters, with turnout reported to be 86.0%.

== Results ==
=== Question 1: Referendums ===
Choice	Votes	%
For	1,636,372	89.03
Against	201,594	10.97
Total	1,837,966	100.00
Valid votes	1,837,966	95.73
Invalid/blank votes	81,967	4.27
Total votes	1,919,933	100.00
Registered voters/turnout	2,231,339	86.04
Source: Nohlen et al.

=== Question 2: Bicameral parliament ===
Choice	Votes	%
For	1,620,231	88.11
Against	218,692	11.89
Total	1,838,923	100.00
Valid votes	1,838,923	95.83
Invalid/blank votes	80,087	4.17
Total votes	1,919,010	100.00
Registered voters/turnout	2,231,339	86.00
Source: Nohlen et al.
