= 1994 South African presidential election =

- 9 May 1994

400 votes in the National Assembly 201 votes needed to win
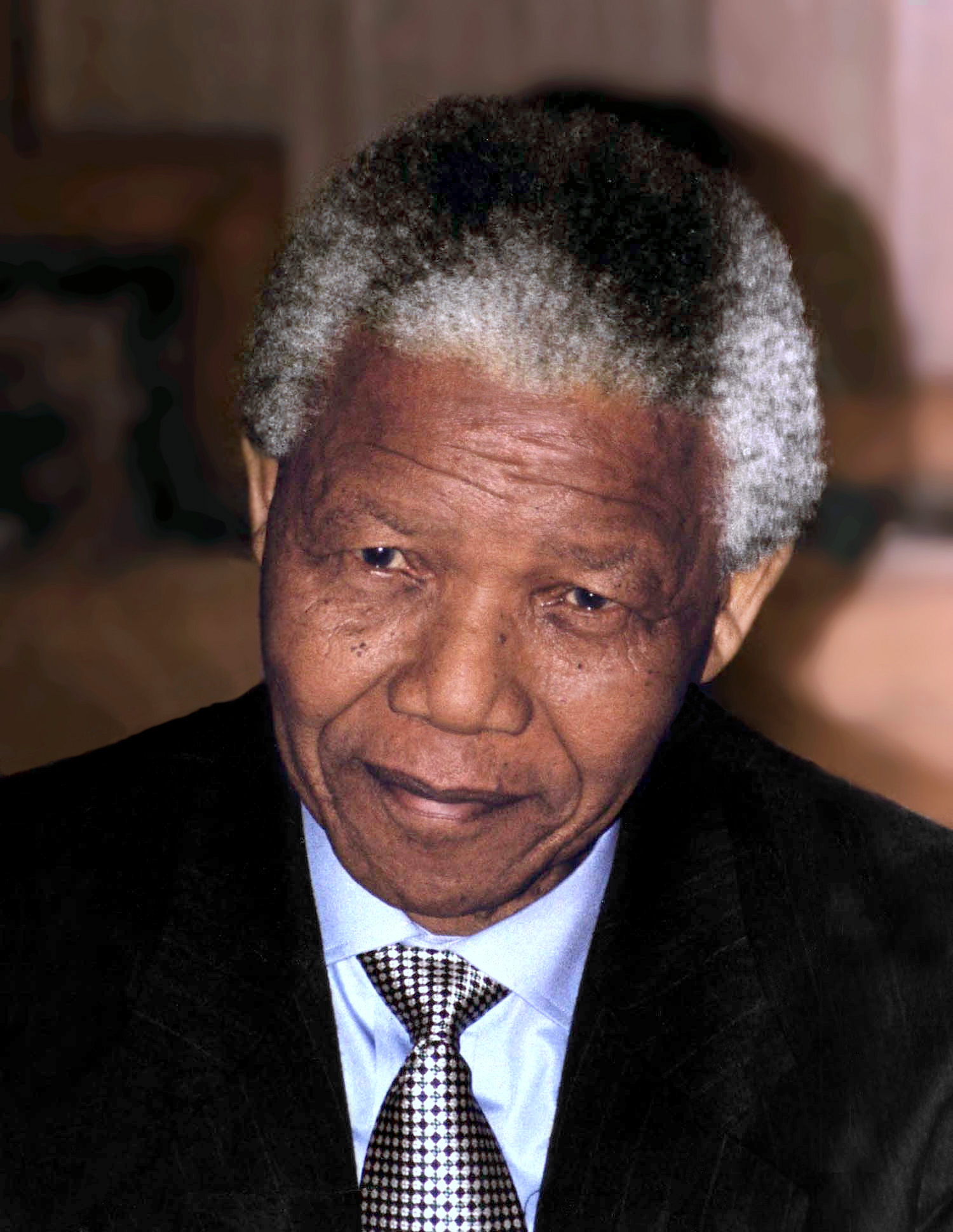
Nominee	Nelson Mandela
Party	ANC
Electoral vote	Unopposed
President before election
F.W. de Klerk
NP
Elected President
Nelson Mandela
ANC

On 9 May 1994, the newly election National Assembly held its first presidential election. This would be the first in which a black chief-executive would be indirectly elected. The African National Congress (ANC) had won an overwhelming majority of 62.25% in the 26-29 April general election. Under the 1993 Interim Constitution, any member of the National Assembly can be nominated for president though will need a 50% +1 majority of the house.

== Elections ==
On 26–29 April 1994, South Africa held its first general election on the basis of universal suffrage. The ANC won this election with 62.25%, giving them an overwhelming mandate to govern outright. This gave the ANC 252 seats in the National Assembly, well over the 201-seat majority and enough to elect a president. On 9 May 1994, once the National Assembly had assembled, newly elected National Assembly member and wife of anti-apartheid activist Walter Sisulu, Albertina Sisulu, nominated Nelson Mandela for president. Mandela stood unopposed and thus was dually elected president of the Republic of South Africa, the first black individual to hold an executive office.

== Inauguration ==
One day after the National Assembly indirectly elected Nelson Mandela as president, the inauguration took place at the Union Buildings in Pretoria. This ceremony involved the swearing in of the president and his executive deputies.
