= 1994 Tajik constitutional referendum =

6 November 1994

Results
Choice	Votes	%
Yes	2,352,554	95.72%
No	105,300	4.28%
Valid votes	2,457,854	96.94%
Invalid or blank votes	77,583	3.06%
Total votes	2,535,437	100.00%
Registered voters/turnout	2,685,724	94.4%

A constitutional referendum was held in Tajikistan on 6 November 1994. The new constitution was approved by 96% of voters.

== Results ==
Choice	Votes	%
For	2,352,554	95.72
Against	105,300	4.28
Total	2,457,854	100.00
Valid votes	2,457,854	96.94
Invalid/blank votes	77,583	3.06
Total votes	2,535,437	100.00
Registered voters/turnout	2,685,724	94.40
Source: Direct Democracy
