= 1994 Little Rock mayoral election =

Little Rock mayoral election, 1994
- November 8, 1994
Candidate	Jim Dailey	Frank Daley
Party	nonpartisan candidate	nonpartisan candidate
Popular vote	3,820	777
Percentage	83.10%	16.90%
Mayor before election
Dalton J. "Jim" Dailey, Jr.
Elected mayor
Dalton J. "Jim" Dailey, Jr.

The 1994 Little Rock mayoral election took place on November 8, 1994, to elect the mayor of Little Rock, Arkansas. It saw the reelection of incumbent mayor Dalton J. "Jim" Dailey, Jr.

This was the first time that voters directly elected the mayor of Little Rock since the city had previously adopted a council–manager government style of government in 1957.

The election was officially nonpartisan.

If no candidate had received a majority of the vote in the initial round, a runoff election was held between the top-two finishers.

== Results ==
Results
Party	Candidate	Votes	%
Nonpartisan	Jim Dailey (incumbent)	3,820	83.10
Nonpartisan	Frank Daley	777	16.90
Total votes		4,597	
