= 1994 Ecuadorian parliamentary election =

Parliamentary elections were held in Ecuador on 1 June 1994. Only the district members of the House of Representatives were elected. The Social Christian Party emerged as the largest party, winning 23 of the 65 seats up for election.

== Results ==
Party	Votes	%	Seats
Social Christian Party	810,846	26.36	23
Ecuadorian Roldosist Party	516,268	16.78	10
Democratic Left	306,272	9.96	6
Democratic People's Movement	253,760	8.25	7
Popular Democracy	253,122	8.23	5
Ecuadorian Revolutionary Popular Action	183,383	5.96	2
Conservative Party	172,725	5.61	6
Alfarista Radical Front	144,508	4.70	1
Republican Union Party	120,096	3.90	1
Socialist Party	98,248	3.19	0
Concentration of People's Forces	67,433	2.19	2
Ecuadorian Radical Liberal Party	61,412	2.00	1
UDP–FADI	30,103	0.98	0
National Liberation	27,174	0.88	1
Latin American People's Union	17,445	0.57	0
People, Change, Democracy	11,044	0.36	0
Assad Bucaram Party	2,523	0.08	0
Total	3,076,362	100.00	65
Valid votes	3,076,362	76.06	
Invalid/blank votes	968,071	23.94	
Total votes	4,044,433	100.00	
Registered voters/turnout	6,175,991	65.49	
Source: Nohlen, Hoy
