= Terry Neese =

American businesswoman and political candidate (born 1946)

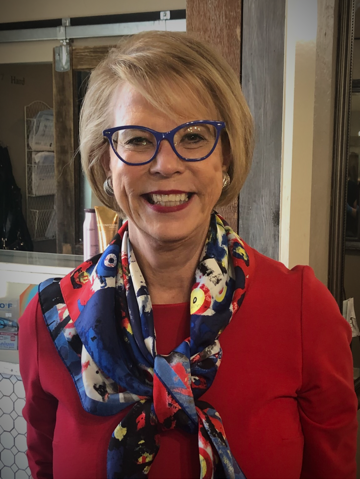

Personal details
- Born: December 1, 1947 (age 78) Walters, Oklahoma, U.S.
- Party: Republican
- Education: University of Oklahoma
- Website: Campaign website

Terry Neese (born December 1, 1947) is an American businesswoman and politician. A member of the Republican Party, she was the first woman nominated by a major political party for the office of Lieutenant Governor of Oklahoma, in 1990; in 2020 she was a candidate for the Republican nomination in Oklahoma's 5th congressional district.

Neese has spent over 30 years working for non-governmental organizations, founding Terry Neese Personnel Services (TNPS), National Grassroots Network, Women Impacting Public Policy (WIPP) and the Institute for Economic Empowerment of Women (IEEW).

Neese is a member of the U.S.-Afghan Women's Council, as well as a past national president of the National Association of Women Business Owners (NAWBO). She is known as a small business expert and was recognized by Fortune magazine as one of the "Power 30" — the most influential small business persons in Washington, D.C. She has been featured throughout several media outlets including MSNBC, FOX News, CNN, SBTV, The Wall Street Journal, the Washington Examiner, The Washington Times and The Washington Post.

== Early life and education ==
Neese was born in Walters, Oklahoma to Clifford and Vida Mae Farley; she was raised in Cookietown, Oklahoma. She has two sisters. She graduated from Burkburnett High School in Burkburnett, Texas. According to Neese, she briefly attended the University of Oklahoma, studying secretarial science with the intention of being an administrative assistant.

== Career ==
Neese began her career as a secretary and office manager. In 1975, she launched her own business, Terry Neese Personnel Service, which has helped over 34,000 people in Oklahoma get jobs. In 2000, she then passed the company to her daughter, Kim Neese-Brown.

The impact of Neese's career then took off as she created and led multiple organizations around the world. She co-founded GrassRoots Impact, Inc. with Democratic National Committee member Barbara Kasoff. GrassRoots Impact provides a communications strategy for corporations and government agencies to effectively reach out to women and minorities in business. In 1986, she founded a charity called Oklahomans Helping Oklahomans. The next year, she was named a co-chair for Business Partners Inc. in Oklahoma.

Neese is a co-founder of WIPP — Women Impacting Public Policy — which was created in 2001. WIPP currently has over 600,000 members and works to advocate for women in business.

Neese currently serves as the founder and CEO of IEEW.org, the Institute for Educating and Empowering Women All Around the World, which is a business education training and mentorship program for women around the world, most notably in Afghanistan & Rwanda.

In 2001, she created the Terry Neese Center for Entrepreneurial Excellence, which is an SBA Women's Business Center. She served as chairwoman of the board.

=== Politics ===
In 1990, Neese became the first woman nominated by a major political party for Lieutenant Governor of Oklahoma.

During the 2016 United States Presidential Election, Neese served as the National Finance Chair for the Carly Fiorina 2016 presidential campaign.

In April 2019, Neese announced her candidacy for Oklahoma's 5th congressional district in the 2020 election. In the June 30, 2020, Republican primary, she placed first among a field of nine candidates, but was then defeated in a runoff election by state senator Stephanie Bice.

=== Controversies ===
Neese had claimed "Native American (Cherokee) Heritage" membership in the Cherokee Nation. This led to her being appointed by President George H. W. Bush in the 1990s to be a Commissioner to the National Advisory Council on Indian Education, whose members must be Native American. She was reappointed to this Council in 1993 by President Bill Clinton. Similarly, President George W. Bush nominated Neese to lead the U.S. Mint in 2005 at least partly because of her claim to have roots in the Cherokee Indian Community. In an article published at the time (of President George W. Bush), Neese stated that "her roots to the Cherokee Indian Community run deep". A 2020 investigation by KFOR later found Neese to have no membership in the Cherokee tribe.

In 2005, Neese was requested to decline a government appointment from President Bush after training tapes had been uncovered in which she instructed her employees to lie and use unethical behavior. At the time, Neese — who had been a large Bush fundraiser — claimed she was declining her appointment as Director of the U.S. Mint for family reasons; the allegation of impropriety was not made until 2019. Neese said the tapes were doctored.

== Awards and nominations ==
Neese was inducted into the Enterprising Women Hall of Fame, sponsored by Enterprising Women, in 2004. In 2013, she earned their Enterprising Women Legacy Award.

Neese was inducted into the Oklahoma Women's Hall of Fame in 2007.

In 2006, Neese was named an Outstanding Business Leader by the Northwood University Board of Trustees and received an honorary Doctor of Laws degree from the university in 2008.

In 2017, Neese was among 24 leaders from the United States and around the globe who were recognized at the 21st annual Global Goddess Artemis Award ceremony (given annually by the Euro-American Women's Council) at the Acropolis Museum in Athens, Greece. Neese was recognized and honored as a leader, innovator and visionary for impacting and supporting women.

In 2018, Neese was honored as one of 100 Oklahoma Women Trailblazers, by the League of Women Voters of Oklahoma, in commemoration of the 100th Anniversary of Oklahoma women winning the right to vote.

Other notable accolades include NAWBO's Lifetime Achievement Award.

== Electoral history ==
2020 Oklahoma's 5th congressional district Republican primary results
Party	Candidate	Votes	%
Republican	Terry Neese	24,828	36.5
Republican	Stephanie Bice	17,292	25.4
Republican	David Hill	12,922	19.0
Republican	Janet Barresi	6,799	10.0
Republican	Jake A. Merrick	1,736	2.6
Republican	Michael Ballard	1,691	2.5
Republican	Miles V. Rahimi	967	1.4
Republican	Shelli Landon	912	1.3
Republican	Charles Tuffy Pringle	908	1.3
Total votes		68,055	100.0

=== Runoff results ===
Republican primary runoff results
Party	Candidate	Votes	%
Republican	Stephanie Bice	27,402	52.9
Republican	Terry Neese	24,369	47.1
Total votes		51,771	100.0

Party political offices
Preceded by Timothy D. Leonard	Republican nominee for Lieutenant Governor of Oklahoma; 1990	Succeeded by Mary Fallin
