= 1994 Oklahoma gubernatorial election =

- November 8, 1994
- Turnout: 42% ▲9.19 pp
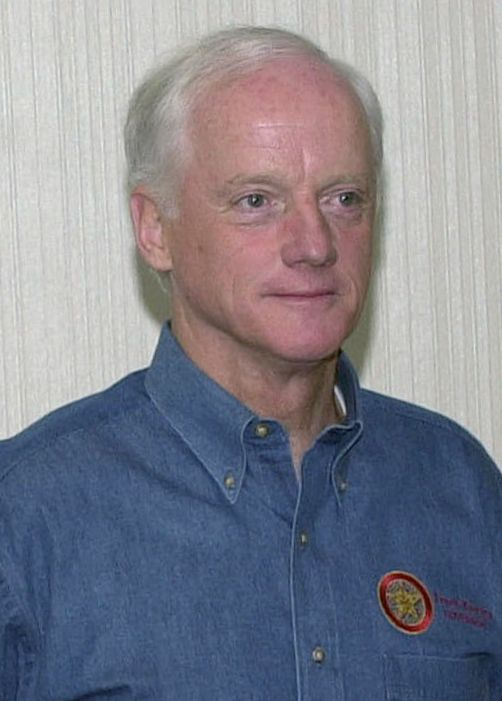

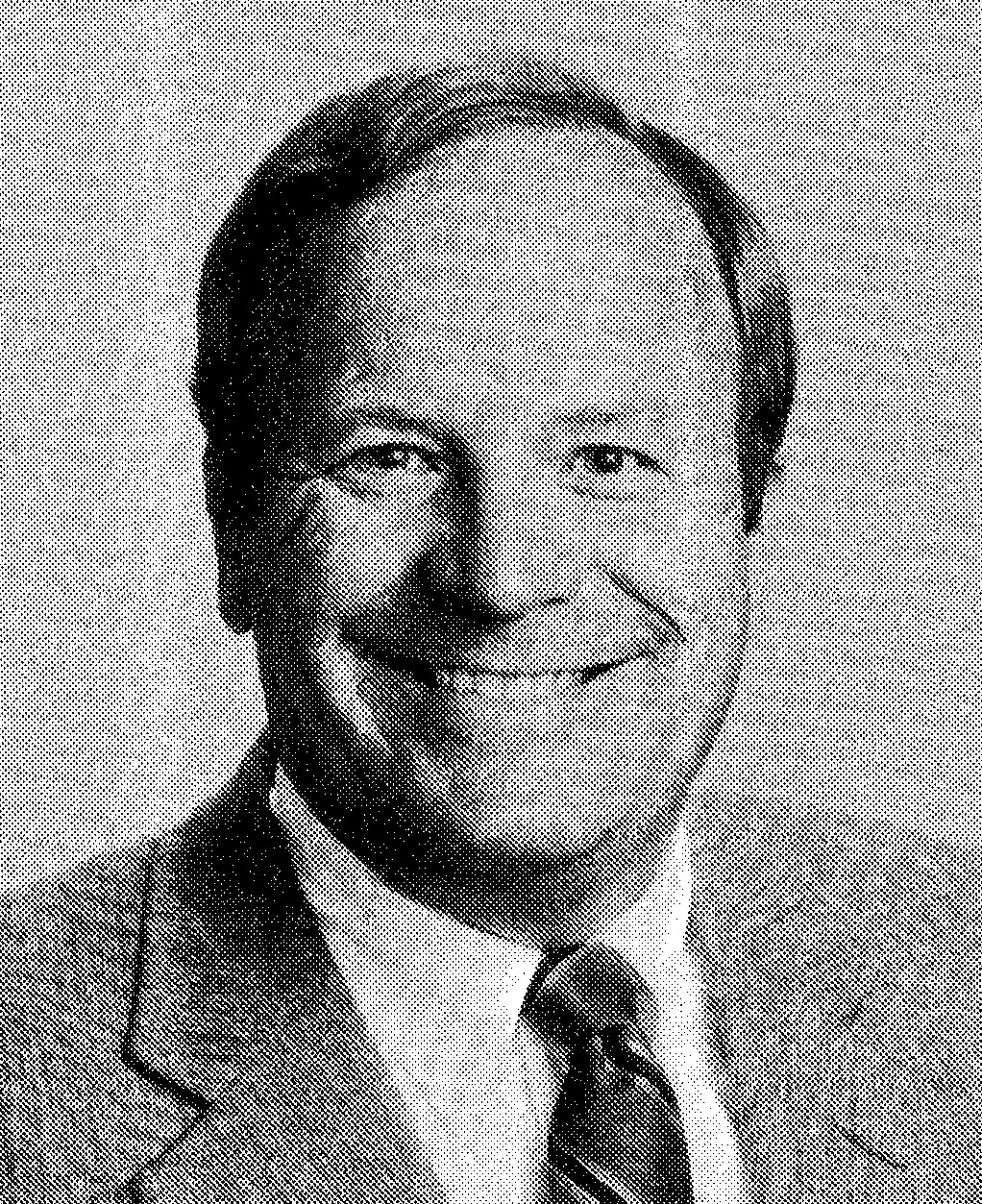

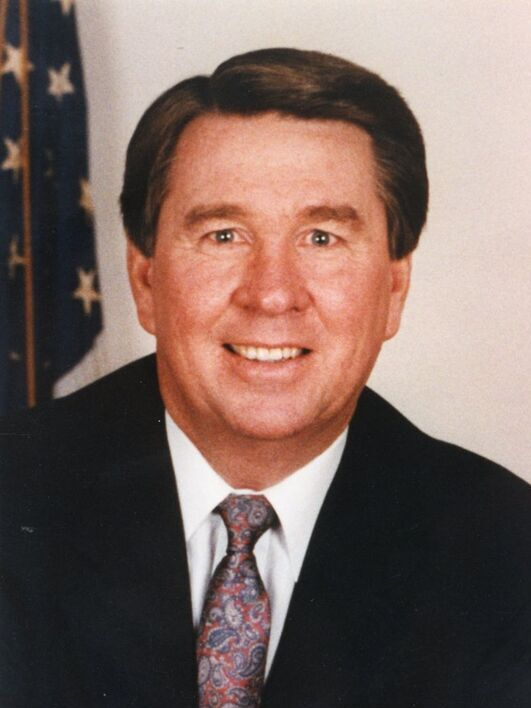
Nominee	Frank Keating	Jack Mildren	Wes Watkins
Party	Republican	Democratic	Independent
Popular vote	466,740	294,936	233,336
Percentage	46.91%	29.64%	23.45%
- County results Keating: 30–40% 40–50% 50–60% 60–70% Mildren: 30–40% 40–50% 50–60% Watkins: 30–40% 40–50% 50–60% 60–70%
Governor before election
David Walters
Democratic
Elected Governor
Frank Keating
Republican

The 1994 Oklahoma gubernatorial election was held on November 8, 1994, and was a race for Governor of Oklahoma. Former United States Associate Attorney General Frank Keating pulled an upset in the three-way race to become only the third Republican governor in Oklahoma history.

The Democratic vote was split between Lieutenant Governor Jack Mildren, an Oklahoma Sooners star quarterback from 1969 to 1971, and former Democratic congressman Wes Watkins, who ran as an independent. Watkins won 24% of the vote and carried numerous counties (by wide margins in some cases); his 233,000 votes far exceeded Keating's 171,000-vote winning margin over Mildren.

This was the first time since Oklahoma statehood that Jackson, Stephens, and Grady counties voted Republican in a gubernatorial election, and the first time since 1914 that Comanche county voted Republican.

== Primary election ==
Primary elections were held on August 23, 1994 with runoffs occurring on September 20, 1994.

=== Democratic party ===
Lt. Governor Jack Mildren and Bernice Shedrick advanced to the runoff where both candidates received vote totals similar to the first primary, securing the win for Mildren.

==== Candidates ====
- Jack Mildren, Lieutenant Governor of Oklahoma
- Bernice Shedrick, state senator
- Joe Vickers
- Danny Williams

==== Results ====
Democratic primary results
Party	Candidate	Votes	%
Democratic	Jack Mildren	214,765	48.56%
Democratic	Bernice Shedrick	165,066	37.33%
Democratic	Danny Williams	46,571	10.53%
Democratic	Joe Vickers	15,821	3.58%
Total votes		442,223	100.00%

Democratic primary runoff results
Party	Candidate	Votes	%
Democratic	Jack Mildren	223,861	58.82%
Democratic	Bernice Shedrick	156,749	41.18%
Total votes		380,610	100.00%

=== Republican party ===
Frank Keating, a former assistant attorney general and member of the Reagan and Bush administrations, defeated four other Republicans to win the GOP nomination.

==== Candidates ====
- Virginia Hale
- Frank Keating- Assistant Attorney General, General Counsel member, and Deputy Secretary of Housing and Urban Development under President George H. W. Bush; Assistant Secretary of the Treasury and United States Associate Attorney General under President Ronald Reagan
- Jerry Kobyluk
- Thomas H. Lay
- Jerry Pierce, member of Oklahoma Senate

==== Results ====
Republican primary results
Party	Candidate	Votes	%
Republican	Frank Keating	117,265	56.94%
Republican	Jerry Pierce	60,280	29.27%
Republican	Virginia Hale	15,229	7.39%
Republican	Thomas H. Lay	7,744	3.76%
Republican	Jerry Kobyluk	5,429	2.64%
Total votes		205,947	100.00%

== General election ==
Wes Watkins, a former representative from Oklahoma's 3rd congressional district, mounted an independent campaign for governor. Watkins had previously sought the Democratic nomination for governor in 1990, but narrowly lost in a runoff to David Walters despite having received the most votes in the initial three-way primary.

=== Polling ===
Source	Date	Keating (R)	Mildren (D)	Watkins (I)
KSWO-TV	Nov. 4, 1994	40%	39%	15%
Tulsa World	Nov. 1, 1994	28%	29%	21%

=== Results ===
1994 Oklahoma gubernatorial election
Party	Candidate	Votes	%	±%
Republican	Frank Keating	466,740	46.91%	+14.25%
Democratic	Jack Mildren	294,936	29.64%	−27.77%
Independent	Wes Watkins	233,336	23.45%	
Total votes		995,012	100.00%	
Plurality		171,804	17.27%	
Republican gain from Democratic		Swing	+42.02%	

=== Results by county ===
County	Frank Keating Republican		Jack Mildren Democratic		Wes Watkins Independent		Margin (Note: Because this was a three-way race, the margins between county winners and county runners up vary among the candidates. The default margin is Keating over Mildren and other combinations are noted for each county.)		Total votes cast
County	#	%	#	%	#	%	#	%	Total votes cast
Adair	2,063	41.95%	1,937	39.39%	918	18.67%	126	2.56%	4,918
Alfalfa	1,017	43.44%	550	23.49%	774	33.06%	243 (Note: Keating's margin over Watkins)	10.38%	2,341
Atoka	839	23.18%	761	21.03%	2,019	55.79%	-1,180 (Note: Watkins' margin over Keating)	-32.61%	3,619
Beaver	1.252	58.95%	416	19.59%	456	21.47%	796	37.48%	2,124
Beckham	2,235	41.85%	1,590	29.77%	1,516	28.38%	645	12.08%	5,341
Blaine	1,803	42.58%	1,076	25.41%	1,355	32.00%	448	10.58%	4,234
Bryan	1,683	17.19%	2,251	23.00%	5,855	59.81%	-3,604 (Note: Watkins' margin over Mildren)	-36.82%	9,789
Caddo	2,607	32.88%	2,705	34.11%	2,618	33.01%	-87 (Note: Mildren's margin over Watkins)	-1.10%	7,930
Canadian	15,004	60.53%	5,460	22.03%	4,322	17.44%	9,544	38.51%	24,786
Carter	3,788	30.41%	3,316	26.62%	5,352	42.97%	-1,564	-12.56%	12,456
Cherokee	3,620	34.63%	4,569	43.71%	2,265	21.67%	-949	-9.08%	10,454
Choctaw	652	15.14%	1,127	26.17%	2,528	58.70%	-1,401	-32.53%	4,307
Cimarron	830	60.01%	226	16.34%	327	23.64%	503	36.37%	1,383
Cleveland	31,459	54.29%	17,409	30.04%	9,076	15.66%	14,050	24.25%	57,944
Coal	381	19.86%	552	28.78%	985	51.36%	-433	-22.58%	1,918
Comanche	10,032	40.97%	9,554	39.02%	4,902	20.02%	478	1.95%	24,488
Cotton	545	23.28%	885	37.80%	911	38.91%	-26	-1.11%	2,341
Craig	1,561	35.50%	1,760	40.03%	1,076	24.47%	-199	-4.53%	4,397
Creek	7,825	42.71%	6,476	35.35%	4,020	21.94%	1,349	7.36%	18,321
Custer	3,857	47.46%	2,098	25.82%	2,171	26.72%	1,686	20.75%	8,126
Delaware	4,050	43.08%	3,619	38.50%	1,732	18.42%	431	4.58%	9,401
Dewey	870	38.91%	472	21.11%	894	39.98%	-24	-1.07%	2,236
Ellis	784	43.58%	365	20.29%	650	36.13%	134	7.45%	1,799
Garfield	11,120	35.34%	5,131	25.53%	3,843	19.13%	5,989	29.80%	20,094
Garvin	2,795	33.06%	2,677	31.66%	2,983	35.28%	-188	-2.22%	8,455
Grady	5,822	43.81%	3,921	29.51%	3,545	26.68%	1,901	14.31%	13,288
Grant	1,004	40.96%	596	24.32%	851	34.72%	153	6.24%	2,451
Greer	609	30.00%	847	41.72%	574	28.28%	-238	-11.72%	2,030
Harmon	252	22.60%	460	41.26%	403	36.14%	-57	-5.11%	1,115
Harper	722	42.55%	385	22.69%	590	34.77%	132	7.78%	1,697
Haskell	736	22.22%	1,220	36.82%	1,357	40.96%	-137	-4.14%	3,313
Hughes	805	18.19%	1,119	25.29%	2,501	56.52%	-1,382	-31.23%	4,425
Jackson	2,604	37.89%	2,180	31.72%	2,089	30.39%	424	6.17%	6,873
Jefferson	408	17.17%	972	40.91%	996	41.92%	-24	-1.01%	2,376
Johnston	505	16.84%	620	20.67%	1,874	62.49%	-1,254	-41.81%	2,999
Kay	8,652	48.52%	5,243	29.40%	3,938	22.08%	3,409	19.12%	17,833
Kingfisher	2,628	48.74%	974	18.06%	1,790	33.20%	838	15.54%	5,392
Kiowa	1,357	35.41%	1,490	38.88%	985	25.70%	-133	-3.47%	3,832
Latimer	509	16.81%	1,121	37.02%	1,398	46.17%	-277	-9.15%	3,028
Le Flore	2,699	26.77%	3,529	35.00%	3,854	38.23%	-325	-3.22%	10,082
Lincoln	3,777	39.49%	2,250	23.52%	3,538	36.99%	239	2.50%	9,565
Logan	5,020	51.39%	2,526	25.86%	2,223	22.76%	2,494	25.53%	9,769
Love	366	14.86%	545	22.13%	1,552	63.01%	-1,007	-40.89%	2,463
Major	1,588	49.19%	579	17.94%	1,061	32.87%	527	16.33%	3,228
Marshall	831	21.78%	1,075	28.18%	1,909	50.04%	-834	-21.86%	3,815
Mayes	3,902	36.47%	4,453	41.62%	2,345	21.92%	-551	-5.15%	10,700
McClain	3,545	43.16%	2,421	29.47%	2,248	27.37%	1,124	13.68%	8,214
McCurtain	1,553	18.57%	2,461	29.43%	4,348	52.00%	-1,887	-22.57%	8,362
McIntosh	1,931	27.67%	2,990	42.85%	2,057	29.48%	-933	-13.37%	6,978
Murray	1,011	25.71%	1,188	30.21%	1,734	44.09%	-546	-13.88%	3,933
Muskogee	6,728	33.93%	8,515	42.94%	4,587	23.13%	-1,787	-9.01%	19,830
Noble	1,865	43.01%	840	19.37%	1,631	37.62%	234	5.40%	4,336
Nowata	1,148	36.06%	1,195	37.53%	841	26.41%	-47	-1.48%	3,184
Okfuskee	1,018	28.29%	1,253	34.82%	1,327	36.88%	-74	-2.06%	3,598
Oklahoma	107,489	58.15%	50,589	27.37%	26,785	14.49%	56,900	30.78%	184,863
Okmulgee	3,335	31.23%	4,718	44.18%	2,626	24.59%	-1,383	-12.95%	10,679
Osage	4,863	39.15%	5,040	40.58%	2,518	20.27%	-177	-1.43%	12,421
Ottawa	2,985	34.62%	4,325	50.16%	1,312	15.22%	-1,340	-15.54%	8,622
Pawnee	2,038	38.27%	1,889	35.47%	1,399	26.27%	149	2.80%	5,326
Payne	7,518	36.95%	3,455	16.98%	9,374	46.07%	-1,856	-9.12%	20,347
Pittsburg	3,352	24.27%	4,558	33.00%	5,903	42.74%	-1,345	-9.74%	13,813
Pontotoc	2,456	20.41%	2,377	19.75%	7,201	59.84%	-4,745	-39.43%	12,034
Pottawatomie	7,458	41.08%	4,967	27.36%	5,730	31.56%	1,728	9.52%	18,155
Pushmataha	760	18.21%	1,115	26.71%	2,299	55.08%	-1,184	-28.37%	4,174
Roger Mills	705	38.55%	479	26.19%	645	35.27%	60	3.28%	1,829
Rogers	9,991	50.34%	6,106	30.76%	3,751	18.90%	3,885	19.57%	19,848
Seminole	2,049	27.32%	1,943	25.91%	3,507	46.77%	-1,458	-19.44%	7,499
Sequoyah	2,827	35.03%	3,911	48.46%	1,333	16.52%	-1,084	-13.43%	8,071
Stephens	5,556	36.57%	4,931	32.46%	4,704	30.97%	625	4.11%	15,191
Texas	2,668	59.13%	792	17.55%	1,052	23.32%	1,616	35.82%	4,512
Tillman	766	28.02%	1,215	44.44%	753	27.54%	-449	-16.42%	2,734
Tulsa	99,606	59.93%	45,549	27.41%	21,044	12.66%	54,057	32.53%	166,199
Wagoner	7,319	47.35%	5,167	33.43%	2,972	19.23%	2,152	13.92%	15,458
Washington	10,319	59.77%	4,401	25.49%	2,544	14.74%	5,918	34.28%	17,264
Washita	1,645	40.07%	1,293	31.50%	1,167	28.43%	352	8.57%	4,105
Woods	1,648	44.50%	830	22.41%	1,225	33.08%	423	11.42%	3,703
Woodward	3,120	49.89%	1,336	21.36%	1,798	28.75%	1,322	21.14%	6,254
Totals	466,470	46.91%	294,936	29.64%	233,336	23.45%	171,804	17.27%	995,012

==== Counties that flipped from Democratic to Republican ====
- Adair
- Alfalfa
- Beckham
- Blaine
- Canadian
- Cimarron
- Cleveland
- Comanche
- Creek
- Custer
- Delaware
- Ellis
- Garfield
- Grady
- Grant
- Harper
- Jackson
- Kay
- Kingfisher
- Lincoln
- Logan
- Major
- McClain
- Noble
- Oklahoma
- Pawnee
- Pottawatomie
- Roger Mills
- Rogers
- Stephens
- Tulsa
- Wagoner
- Washington
- Washita
- Woods
- Woodward

==== Counties that flipped from Democratic to Independent ====
- Atoka
- Bryan
- Carter
- Choctaw
- Coal
- Cotton
- Dewey
- Garvin
- Haskell
- Hughes
- Jefferson
- Johnston
- Latimer
- Le Flore
- Love
- Marshall
- McCurtain
- Murray
- Okfuskee
- Payne
- Pittsburg
- Pontotoc
- Pushmataha
- Seminole
