= Jack Mildren =

American football player and politician (1949–2008)

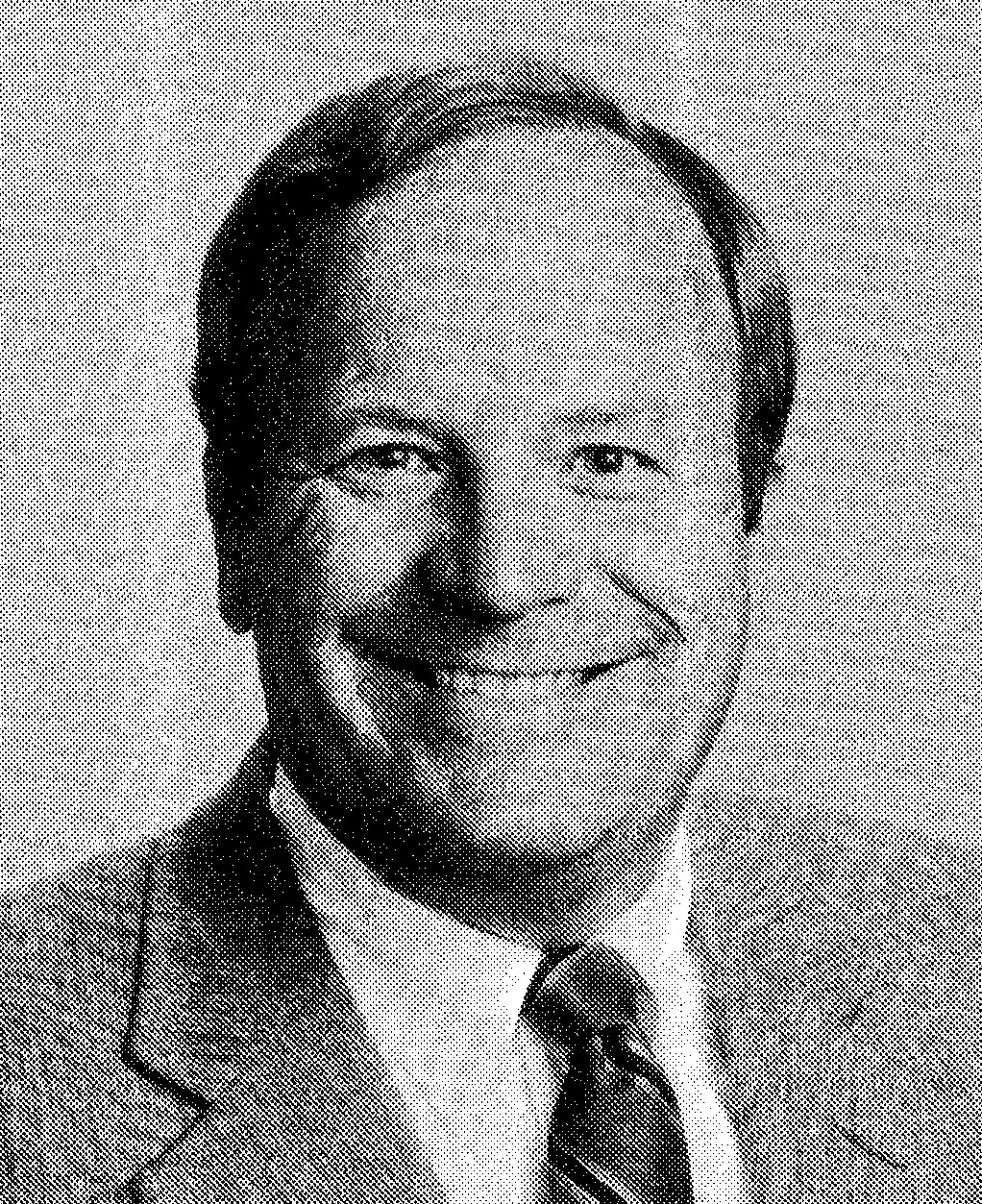
- Mildren, c. 1991

13th Lieutenant Governor of Oklahoma
- In office January 14, 1991 – January 9, 1995
- Governor: David Walters
- Preceded by: Robert Kerr
- Succeeded by: Mary Fallin

Personal details
- Born: October 10, 1949 Kingsville, Texas, U.S.
- Died: May 22, 2008 (aged 58) Oklahoma City, Oklahoma, U.S.
- Party: Democratic
- Education: University of Oklahoma (BA)
- Football career

Profile
- Position: Quarterback

Career information
- College: Oklahoma
- NFL draft: 1972: 2 / Pick 46th round

Career history
- 1972–1973: Baltimore Colts
- 1974: New England Patriots

Awards and highlights
- Second-team All-American (1971); First-team All-Big Eight (1971)
- Stats at Pro Football Reference

Larry Jack Mildren (October 10, 1949 – May 22, 2008), was an American football player and politician. He was an All-American quarterback at the University of Oklahoma, and professional football player with the Baltimore Colts and New England Patriots. A native Texan, he was later an oil company owner, elected as the 13th lieutenant governor of Oklahoma, and enjoyed a career as a successful bank executive in Oklahoma.

== Early life ==
Born in Kingsville, Texas, Mildren played football at Cooper High School in Abilene, set passing records, and graduated in 1968.

== College football ==
Mildren is perhaps best known as the "Godfather of the Wishbone" going back to his days as quarterback at the University of Oklahoma (1969–71). Introduced at OU in October 1970 by head coach Chuck Fairbanks, the success of "The Bone" depended on a quarterback with a rare combination of quickness, strength, and intelligence. Posting a mediocre 6–4 record in Mildren's sophomore year in 1969 and off to a lackluster 2–1 start in 1970, Fairbanks' Sooners installed the option offense during the two-week period between a 23–14 home loss to Oregon State, and the annual Red River Rivalry clash against arch-rival Texas. Despite losing 41–9 to the Longhorns (who had run the wishbone to a national title the previous season), Oklahoma quickly turned their season around, going 5–2–1 in their final eight games, and also ushered in a period of rushing dominance seldom seen before or since.

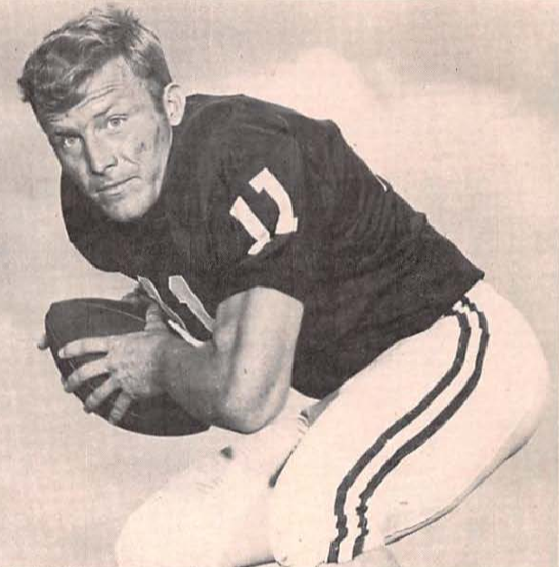
Mildren as a quarterback for the Oklahoma Sooners, c. 1971

Mildren set records in his senior season in 1971 that have since been exceeded. The Sooners posted an 11–1 record, with the wishbone averaging over 472 yards rushing per game. Mildren set records for most rushing yards in a season (1,140), most career touchdown passes (25), and season passing efficiency (209.0) record. OU won its first nine games and fell just short of a national championship, losing 35–31 at home in Norman on Thanksgiving to eventual champ Nebraska, billed as the Game of the Century. The defending national champion Cornhuskers gambled defensively by taking halfback Greg Pruitt out of the action and forced Mildren to defeat them virtually on his own; he threw for two touchdowns and ran for two more.

Mildren was named both All-American and Academic All-American his senior season. He was also named the Sugar Bowl MVP after the Sooners' 40–22 victory over #5 Auburn in New Orleans on New Year's Day, a game OU led 31–0 at halftime. Mildren's 1971 single-season record for yards rushing by a quarterback (1,140) was broken three seasons later by Freddie Solomon.

== Pro football ==
Mildren was selected in the second round of the 1972 NFL draft (46th overall) by the Baltimore Colts and joined the ranks of the pros for three seasons, playing defensive back for the Colts and New England Patriots.

== Political career ==
In 1990, Mildren was elected the 22nd Lieutenant Governor of Oklahoma. In 1994, Mildren was the Democratic nominee for Governor of Oklahoma, losing to Republican Frank Keating by approximately 17% of the popular vote (in a three-way race; narrowly coming in second place against independent gubernatorial candidate Wes Watkins, a former Democratic Congressman who later become a GOP Congressman). Although Mildren was at first the frontrunner in the Governor's race, 1994 was a strong year for the Republican party while President Bill Clinton was controversial nationally and unpopular in Oklahoma. The Republican congressional landslide of 1994 included the historic takeover of both houses of the U.S. Congress.

== Career in banking ==
Mildren served as the Vice-Chairman for the Arvest Bank Group, and as an announcer for Jox 930 WKY – Oklahoma's oldest radio station – which is an all-sports radio station in Oklahoma City. He was also a regular contributor on WWLS The Sports Animal, having a regular segment with Al and Jim (The Total Dominance Hour).

== Personal life ==
Mildren had four children; Leigh Woody (married to Russell Woody), Lauren Buchanan (married to Brad Buchanan) and Andrew Mildren (married to Caroline Mildren). His lineage now includes grandsons: Jacob Mildren Woody, Christopher Russell Woody, Jack Culver Mildren and Lucas Taylor Buchanan; and he had two granddaughters Elizabeth Grace Mildren and Olivia Claire Mildren. He is survived as well by his wife Janis. A fourth child, Jason Lamont, died at the age of one.

== Death ==
Mildren died of stomach cancer at age 58 in 2008.

Political offices
Preceded by Robert Kerr	Lieutenant Governor of Oklahoma; 1991–1995	Succeeded by Mary Fallin
Party political offices
Preceded by Robert S. Kerr III	Democratic nominee for Lieutenant Governor of Oklahoma; 1990	Succeeded by Nance Diamond
Preceded by David Walters	Democratic nominee for Governor of Oklahoma; 1994	Succeeded by Laura Boyd
