= 1990 United States gubernatorial elections =

- November 6, 1990

38 governorships 36 states; 2 territories
	Majority party	Minority party
Party	Democratic	Republican
Seats before	29	21
Seats after	28	20
Seat change	▼1	▼1
Popular vote	26,938,883	24,250,423
Percentage	49.86%	44.88%
Seats up	20	16
Seats won	19	15
	Third party	Fourth party
Party	A Connecticut Party	Alaskan Independence
Seats before	0	0
Seats after	1	1
Seat change	▲1	▲1
Popular vote	460,576	75,721
Percentage	0.85%	0.14%
Seats up	0	0
Seats won	1	1
- Map of the results Democratic gain Republican gain Democratic hold Republican hold Alaskan Independence gain A Connecticut Party gain No election

United States gubernatorial elections were held on November 6, 1990, in 36 states and two territories. Most elected in these elections would serve for a 4-year term, while those in New Hampshire, Rhode Island, and Vermont would serve for a 2-year term. The elections coincided with the mid-term elections for the United States Senate and the United States House of Representatives. Heading into the elections, there were 20 seats held by Democrats and 16 held by Republicans. By the end of the elections, 19 seats would be held by a Democrat, 15 would be held by a Republican, and two would be held by other parties.

Notably, in these elections, there were two people elected from a third party: former Alaskan governor and Secretary of the Interior under President Nixon Walter Joseph Hickel was elected governor as a part of the Alaskan Independence Party, and former U.S. Senator Lowell Weicker of Connecticut won on A Connecticut Party's ticket. In addition to Weicker, two other U.S. senators were elected governors that year, Republican Pete Wilson of California and Democrat Lawton Chiles of Florida. The 1990 cycle saw six incumbent governors defeated. These were Republicans Mike Hayden of Kansas, Kay Orr of Nebraska, Bob Martinez of Florida and Edward DiPrete of Rhode Island, as well as Democrats James Blanchard of Michigan and Rudy Perpich of Minnesota.

In 1988, Arizona voters approved a runoff-style election following the impeachment of governor Evan Mecham. Because no candidate received a majority (50%) of the vote in the November election, a run-off election occurred on February 26, 1991. This style of voting was later repealed in 1992.

== Election results ==
=== States ===
State	Incumbent	Party	First elected	Result	Candidates
Alabama	H. Guy Hunt	Republican	1986	Incumbent re-elected.	✓ H. Guy Hunt (Republican) 52.1%; Paul Hubbert (Democratic) 47.9%
Alaska	Steve Cowper	Democratic	1986	Incumbent retired. New governor elected. AK Independence gain.	✓ Wally Hickel (AK Independence) 38.9%; Tony Knowles (Democratic) 30.9%; Arliss Sturgulewski (Republican) 26.2%; Jim Sykes (Green) 3.4%
Arizona	Rose Mofford	Democratic	1988 (Note: Mofford took office after her predecessor (Evan Mecham) was removed from office.)	Incumbent retired. New governor elected. Republican gain.	✓ Fife Symington (Republican) 52.4%; Terry Goddard (Democratic) 47.6%
Arkansas	Bill Clinton	Democratic	1978; 1980 (defeated); 1982	Incumbent re-elected.	✓ Bill Clinton (Democratic) 57.5%; Sheffield Nelson (Republican) 42.5%
California	George Deukmejian	Republican	1982	Incumbent retired. New governor elected. Republican hold.	✓ Pete Wilson (Republican) 49.2%; Dianne Feinstein (Democratic) 45.8%; Dennis Thompson (Libertarian) 1.9%; Jerome McCready (American Independent) 1.8%; Maria E. Muñoz (Peace and Freedom) 1.3%
Colorado	Roy Romer	Democratic	1986	Incumbent re-elected.	✓ Roy Romer (Democratic) 61.9%; John Andrews (Republican) 35.4%; David Aitken (Libertarian) 1.9%
Connecticut	William A. O'Neill	Democratic	1980 (Note: O'Neill took office after his predecessor (Ella Grasso) resigned. He was subsequently elected in the 1982 Connecticut gubernatorial election.)	Incumbent retired. New governor elected. A Connecticut Party gain.	✓ Lowell Weicker (A Connecticut Party) 40.4%; John G. Rowland (Republican) 37.5%; Bruce Morrison (Democratic) 20.7%; Joseph Zdonczyk (Concerned Citizens) 1.4%
Florida	Bob Martinez	Republican	1986	Incumbent lost re-election. New governor elected. Democratic gain.	✓ Lawton Chiles (Democratic) 56.5%; Bob Martinez (Republican) 43.5%
Georgia	Joe Frank Harris	Democratic	1982	Incumbent term-limited. New governor elected. Democratic hold.	✓ Zell Miller (Democratic) 52.9%; Johnny Isakson (Republican) 44.5%; Carole Ann Rand (Libertarian) 2.6%
Hawaii	John D. Waiheʻe III	Democratic	1986	Incumbent re-elected.	✓ John D. Waiheʻe III (Democratic) 59.8%; Fred Hemmings (Republican) 38.6%
Idaho	Cecil Andrus	Democratic	1970; 1977 (resigned); 1986	Incumbent re-elected.	✓ Cecil Andrus (Democratic) 68.2%; Roger Fairchild (Republican) 31.8%
Illinois	James R. Thompson	Republican	1976	Incumbent retired. New governor elected. Republican hold.	✓ Jim Edgar (Republican) 50.7%; Neil Hartigan (Democratic) 48.2%; Jessie Fields (Solidarity) 1.1%
Iowa	Terry Branstad	Republican	1982	Incumbent re-elected.	✓ Terry Branstad (Republican) 60.6%; Donald Avenson (Democratic) 38.8%
Kansas	Mike Hayden	Republican	1986	Incumbent lost re-election. New governor elected. Democratic gain.	✓ Joan Finney (Democratic) 48.6%; Mike Hayden (Republican) 42.6%; Christina Campbell-Cline (Independent) 8.8%
Maine	John R. McKernan Jr.	Republican	1986	Incumbent re-elected.	✓ John R. McKernan Jr. (Republican) 46.7%; Joseph E. Brennan (Democratic) 44.0%; Andrew Adam (Independent) 9.3%
Maryland	William D. Schaefer	Democratic	1986	Incumbent re-elected.	✓ William D. Schaefer (Democratic) 59.8%; William S. Shepard (Republican) 40.2%
Massachusetts	Michael Dukakis	Democratic	1982	Incumbent retired. New governor elected. Republican gain.	✓ Bill Weld (Republican) 50.2%; John Silber (Democratic) 46.9%; Leonard Umina (Independent) 2.7%
Michigan	James Blanchard	Democratic	1982	Incumbent lost re-election. New governor elected. Republican gain.	✓ John Engler (Republican) 49.8%; James Blanchard (Democratic) 49.1%; William Roundtree (Workers World) 1.1%
Minnesota	Rudy Perpich	Democratic	1982	Incumbent lost re-election. New governor elected. Republican gain.	✓ Arne Carlson (Republican) 50.1%; Rudy Perpich (Democratic) 46.8%; Heart Warrior Chosa (EarthRIGHT) 1.2%; Ross S. Culverhouse (Grassroots) 1.0%
Nebraska	Kay A. Orr	Republican	1986	Incumbent lost re-election. New governor elected. Democratic gain.	✓ Ben Nelson (Democratic) 49.9%; Kay A. Orr (Republican) 49.2%
Nevada	Bob Miller	Democratic	1989 (Note: Miller took office after his predecessor (Richard Bryan) resigned.)	Incumbent elected to full term.	✓ Bob Miller (Democratic) 64.8%; Jim Gallaway (Republican) 29.9%; None of These Candidates 2.8%; James Frye (Libertarian) 2.5%
New Hampshire	Judd Gregg	Republican	1988	Incumbent re-elected.	✓ Judd Gregg (Republican) 60.3%; Joseph Grandmaison (Democratic) 34.5%; Miriam Luce (Libertarian) 4.9%
New Mexico	Garrey Carruthers	Republican	1986	Incumbent term-limited. New governor elected. Democratic gain.	✓ Bruce King (Democratic) 54.6%; Frank M. Bond (Republican) 45.2%
New York	Mario Cuomo	Democratic	1982	Incumbent re-elected.	✓ Mario Cuomo (Democratic) 53.2%; Pierre A. Rinfret (Republican) 21.3%; Herbert London (Conservative) 20.4%; Louis P. Wein (Right to Life) 3.4%
Ohio	Dick Celeste	Democratic	1982	Incumbent term-limited. New governor elected. Republican gain.	✓ George Voinovich (Republican) 55.7%; Anthony J. Celebrezze Jr. (Democratic) 44.3%
Oklahoma	Henry Bellmon	Republican	1986	Incumbent retired. New governor elected. Democratic gain.	✓ David Walters (Democratic) 57.4%; Bill Price (Republican) 32.7%; Thomas Ledgerwood (Independent) 9.9%
Oregon	Neil Goldschmidt	Democratic	1986	Incumbent retired. New governor elected. Democratic hold.	✓ Barbara Roberts (Democratic) 45.7%; David B. Frohnmayer (Republican) 40.0%; Al Mobley (Independent) 13.0%; Fred Oerther (Libertarian) 1.3%
Pennsylvania	Bob Casey Sr.	Democratic	1986	Incumbent re-elected.	✓ Bob Casey Sr. (Democratic) 67.6%; Barbara Hafer (Republican) 32.3%
Rhode Island	Edward D. DiPrete	Republican	1984	Incumbent lost re-election. New governor elected. Democratic gain.	✓ Bruce Sundlun (Democratic) 74.2%; Edward D. DiPrete (Republican) 25.8%
South Carolina	Carroll A. Campbell Jr.	Republican	1986	Incumbent re-elected.	✓ Carroll A. Campbell Jr. (Republican) 69.5%; Theo Mitchell (Democratic) 27.8%; John Peeples (American) 2.3%
South Dakota	George S. Mickelson	Republican	1986	Incumbent re-elected.	✓ George S. Mickelson (Republican) 58.9%; Bob L. Samuelson (Democratic) 41.1%
Tennessee	Ned McWherter	Democratic	1986	Incumbent re-elected.	✓ Ned McWherter (Democratic) 60.8%; Dwight Henry (Republican) 36.6%; W. Curtis Jacox (Independent) 1.4%; David B. Shepard (Independent) 1.1%
Texas	Bill Clements	Republican	1978; 1982 (defeated); 1986	Incumbent retired. New governor elected. Democratic gain.	✓ Ann Richards (Democratic) 49.5%; Clayton Williams (Republican) 46.9%; Jeff Daiell (Libertarian) 3.3%
Vermont	Madeleine Kunin	Democratic	1984	Incumbent retired. New governor elected. Republican gain.	✓ Richard A. Snelling (Republican) 51.8%; Peter Welch (Democratic) 46.0%; David Atkinson (Libertarian) 1.3%
Wisconsin	Tommy Thompson	Republican	1986	Incumbent re-elected.	✓ Tommy Thompson (Republican) 58.1%; Thomas A. Loftus (Democratic) 41.8%
Wyoming	Mike Sullivan	Democratic	1986	Incumbent re-elected.	✓ Mike Sullivan (Democratic) 65.3%; Mary Mead (Republican) 34.6%

=== Territories and federal district ===
State	Incumbent	Party	First elected	Result	Candidates
District of Columbia	Marion Barry	Democratic	1978	Incumbent retired. New mayor elected. Democratic hold.	✓ Sharon Pratt (Democratic) 86.1%; Maurice Turner (Republican) 11.5%
Guam	Joseph Franklin Ada	Republican	1986	Incumbent re-elected.	✓ Joseph Franklin Ada (Republican) 56.9%; Madeleine Bordallo (Democratic) 43.1%
U.S. Virgin Islands	Alexander Farrelly	Democratic	1986	Incumbent re-elected.	✓ Alexander Farrelly (Democratic) 56.5%; Juan Francisco Luis (Independent) 38.5%

== Closest states ==
States where the margin of victory was under 1%:

1. Michigan, 0.7%
2. Nebraska, 0.7%

States where the margin of victory was under 5%:

1. Illinois, 2.5%
2. Texas, 2.6%
3. Maine, 2.7%
4. Connecticut, 2.9%
5. Massachusetts, 3.3%
6. Minnesota, 3.3%
7. California, 3.4%
8. Alabama, 4.2%
9. Arizona, 4.8%

States where the margin of victory was under 10%:

1. Oregon, 5.7%
2. Vermont, 5.8%
3. Kansas, 6.0%
4. Alaska, 8.0%
5. Georgia, 8.4%
6. New Mexico, 9.4%

== Alabama ==
1990 Alabama gubernatorial election
- November 6, 1990
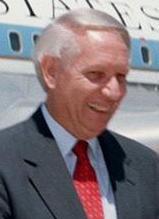

Nominee	H. Guy Hunt	Paul Hubbert
Party	Republican	Democratic
Popular vote	633,519	582,106
Percentage	52.1%	47.9%
- County results Hunt: 50–60% 60–70% 70–80% Hubbert: 50–60% 60–70% 70–80% 80–90%
Governor before election
H. Guy Hunt
Republican
Elected Governor
H. Guy Hunt
Republican

The 1990 Alabama gubernatorial election was held on November 6, 1990, to select the governor of Alabama. The election saw incumbent Republican governor Guy Hunt defeat Democrat Paul Hubbert, executive secretary of the Alabama Education Association. This marked the first time in history that a Republican won a second gubernatorial term in Alabama.

== Alaska ==
1990 Alaska gubernatorial election
- November 6, 1990
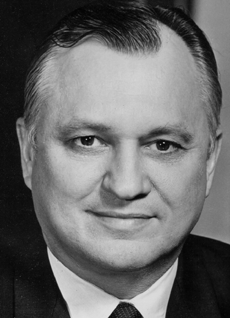

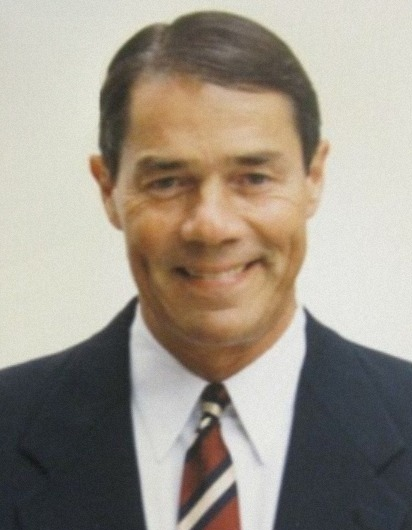

Nominee	Wally Hickel	Tony Knowles	Arliss Sturgulewski
Party	Independence	Democratic	Republican
Running mate	Jack Coghill	Willie Hensley	Jim Campbell
Popular vote	75,721	60,201	50,991
Percentage	38.88%	30.91%	26.18%
- Hickel: 30-40% 40-50% 50-60% 60-70% Knowles: 30–40% 40–50% 50–60% 60–70% 70–80% 80–90% Sturgulewski: 30–40% 40–50% 50–60% 60–70%
Governor before election
Steve Cowper
Democratic
Elected Governor
Wally Hickel
Independence

The 1990 Alaska gubernatorial election took place on November 6, 1990, for the open seat of Governor of Alaska. In 1989, incumbent governor Steve Cowper, a Democrat, had announced that he would not seek re-election for a second term.

In a rare third-party win in American politics, former Republican governor Wally Hickel, running on the ticket of the Alaskan Independence Party, defeated Democratic candidate Tony Knowles and Republican candidate Arliss Sturgulewski.

== Arizona ==
1990–91 Arizona gubernatorial election
- November 6, 1990 (first round); February 26, 1991 (runoff)
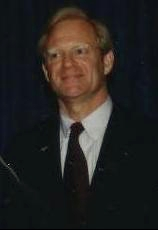

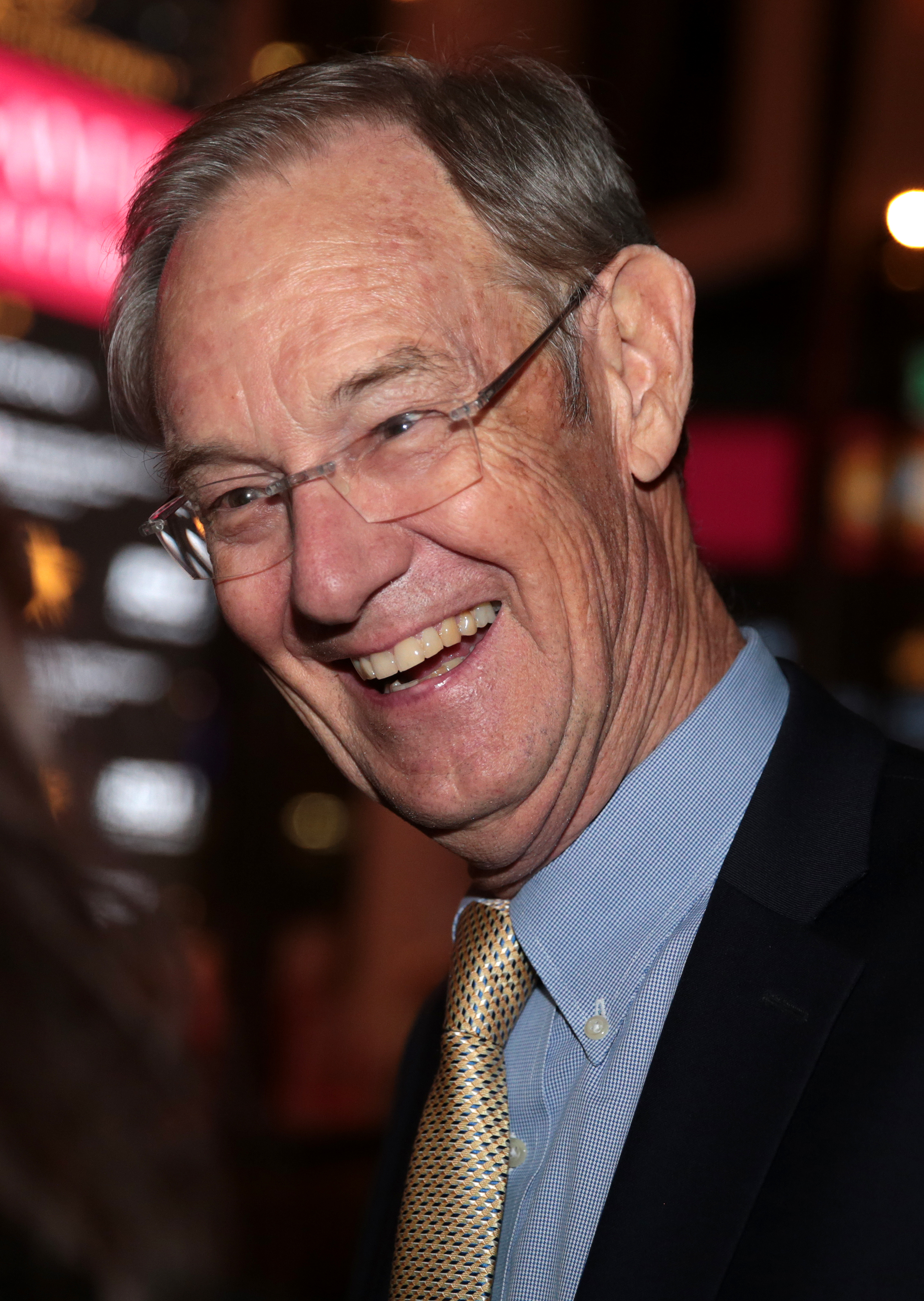
Candidate	Fife Symington	Terry Goddard
Party	Republican	Democratic
First round	523,984; 49.7%	519,691; 49.2%
Runoff	492,569; 52.4%	448,168; 47.6%
- Symington: 50–60% Goddard: 40–50% 50–60% 60–70% 70–80%
Governor before election
Rose Mofford
Democratic
Elected Governor
Fife Symington
Republican

The 1990–91 Arizona gubernatorial election took place on November 6, 1990, for the post of Governor of Arizona. Incumbent Democratic Governor Rose Mofford declined to run for a full term. Republican Fife Symington defeated the Democratic nominee and Mayor of Phoenix Terry Goddard. Because no candidate received a majority of votes, a runoff election was held later on February 26, 1991, which Symington also won. This is the only election where Arizona used a runoff election.

Evan Mecham, a former governor who was removed from office in 1988 upon being convicted in his impeachment trial, unsuccessfully ran for another term. This would be the last gubernatorial election until 2018 when the victorious gubernatorial candidate in the state would be of the same party as the incumbent president.

== Arkansas ==
1990 Arkansas gubernatorial election
- November 6, 1990

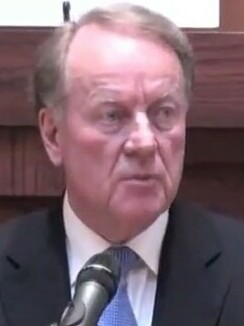
Nominee	Bill Clinton	Sheffield Nelson
Party	Democratic	Republican
Popular vote	400,386	295,925
Percentage	57.49%	42.49%
- County results Clinton: 50–60% 60–70% 70–80% Nelson: 50–60% 60–70%
Governor before election
Bill Clinton
Democratic
Elected Governor
Bill Clinton
Democratic

The 1990 Arkansas gubernatorial election took place on November 6, 1990. Incumbent Democratic governor Bill Clinton won re-election in a two-way race against Democrat turned Republican Sheffield Nelson with 57.5% of the vote. This was Clinton's fourth consecutive, and fifth overall, term as Governor of Arkansas, as well as his final term (he was elected to the presidency in 1992).

== California ==
1990 California gubernatorial election
- November 6, 1990
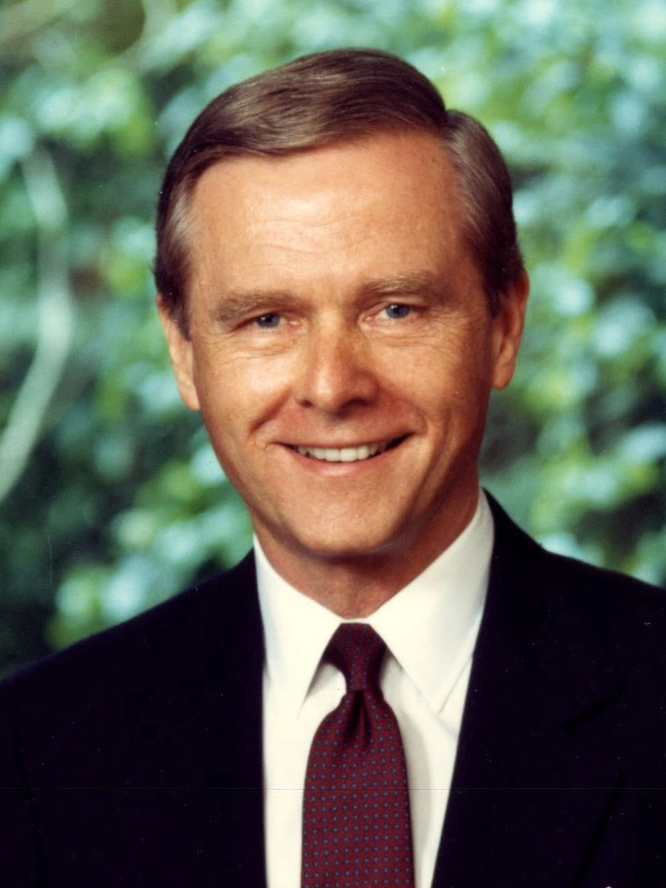

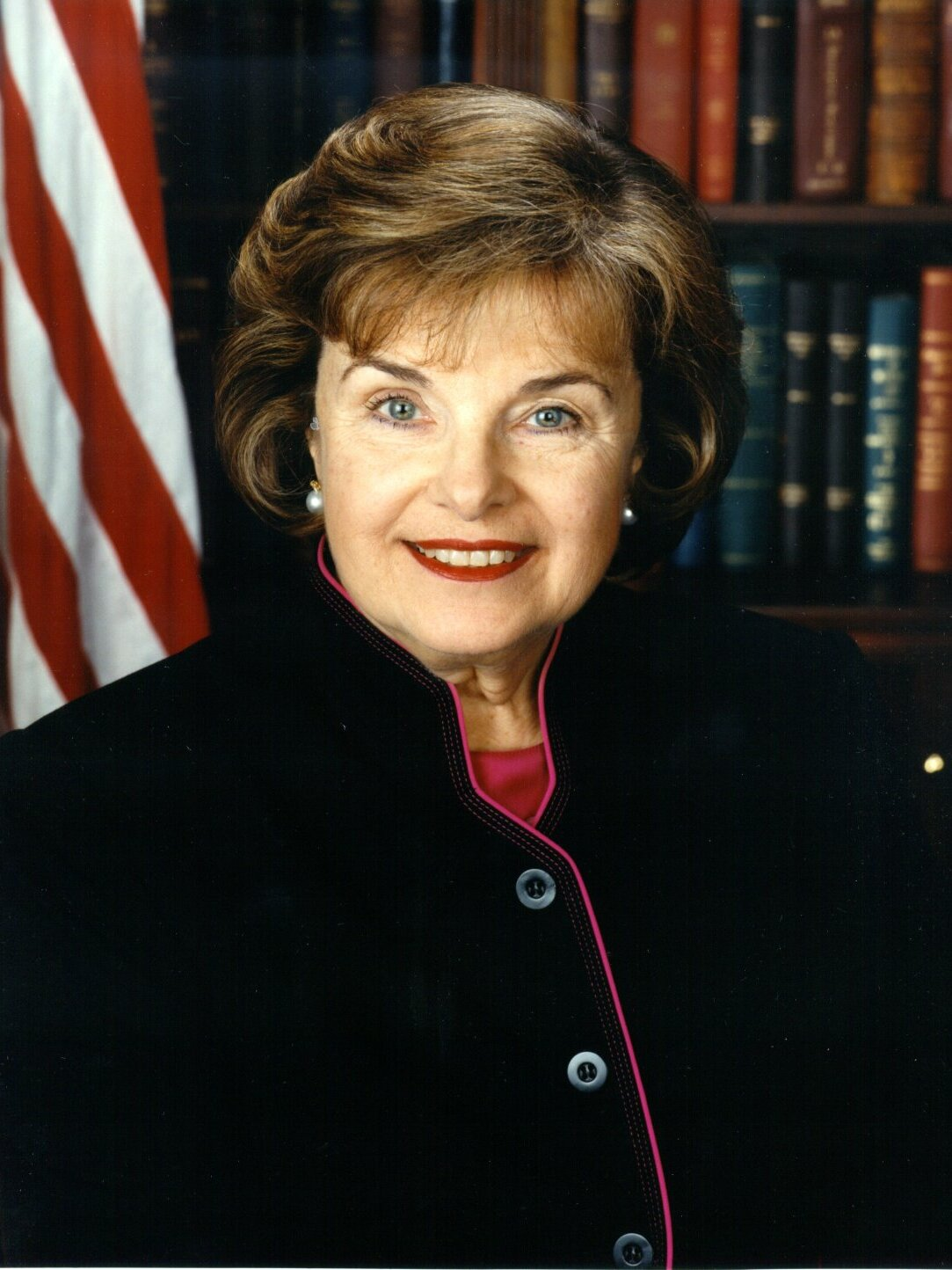
Nominee	Pete Wilson	Dianne Feinstein
Party	Republican	Democratic
Popular vote	3,791,904	3,525,197
Percentage	49.25%	45.78%
- Wilson: 40–50% 50–60% 60–70% Feinstein: 40–50% 50–60% 60–70% 70–80%
Governor before election
George Deukmejian
Republican
Elected Governor
Pete Wilson
Republican

The 1990 California gubernatorial election was held on November 6, 1990. The Republican candidate, Senator Pete Wilson, defeated the Democratic candidate, former San Francisco mayor Dianne Feinstein.

== Colorado ==
1990 Colorado gubernatorial election
- November 6, 1990
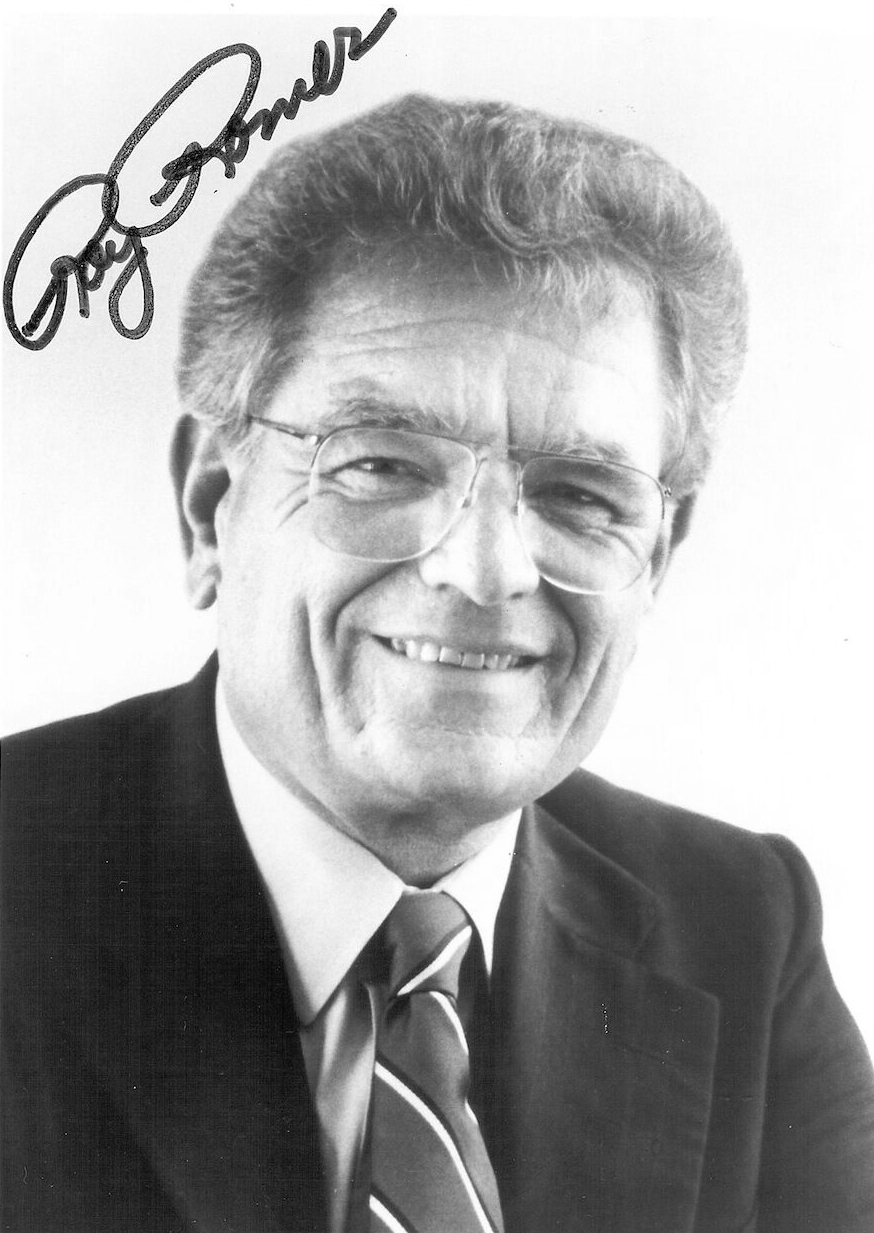

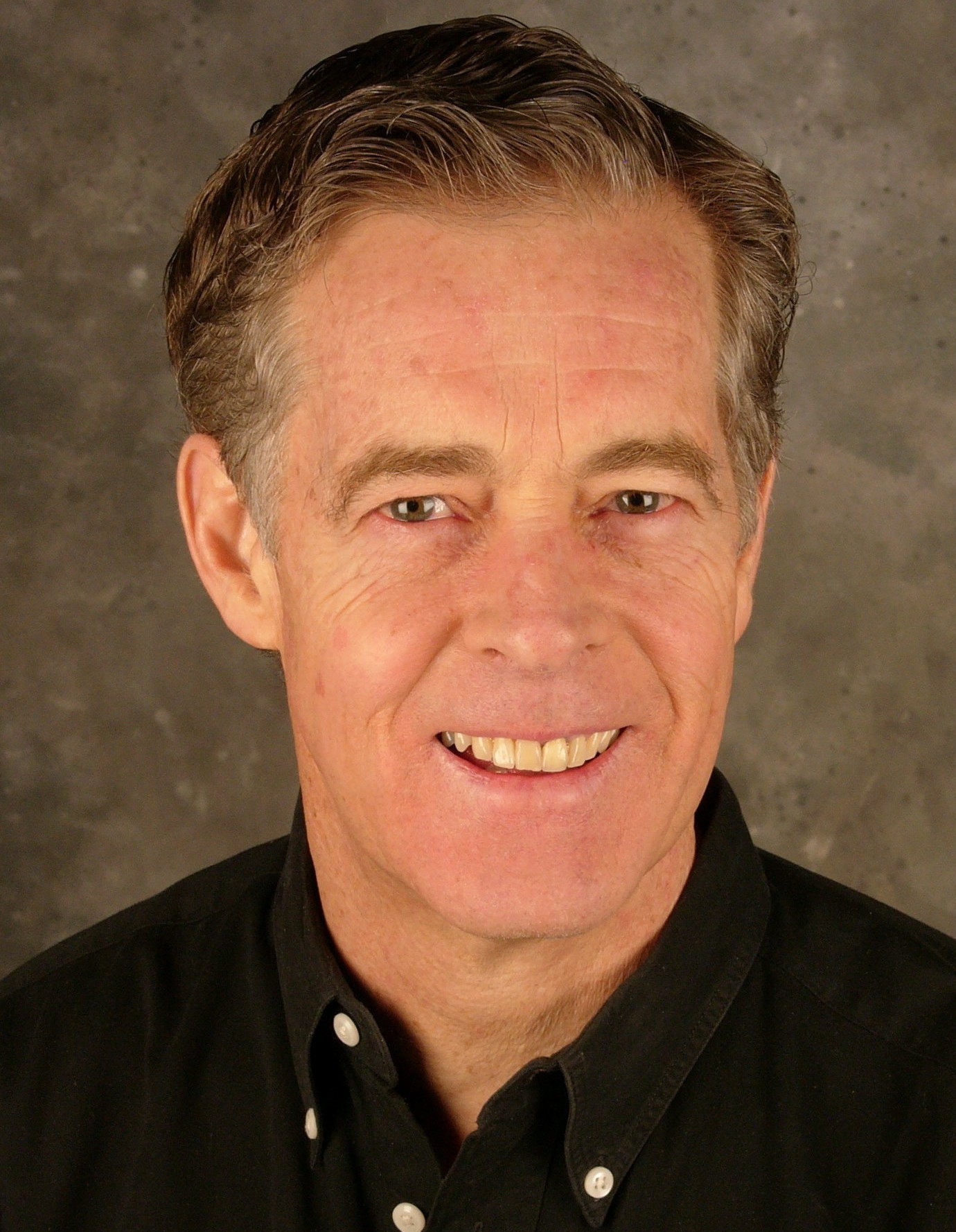
Nominee	Roy Romer	John Andrews
Party	Democratic	Republican
Running mate	Mike Callihan	Lillian Bickel
Popular vote	626,032	358,403
Percentage	61.89%	35.43%
- County results Romer: 40–50% 50–60% 60–70% 70–80% Andrews: 50–60% 60–70%
Governor before election
Roy Romer
Democratic
Elected Governor
Roy Romer
Democratic

The 1990 Colorado gubernatorial election was held on November 6, 1990. Incumbent Democrat Roy Romer defeated Republican nominee John Andrews with 61.89% of the vote.

== Connecticut ==
1990 Connecticut gubernatorial election
- November 6, 1990
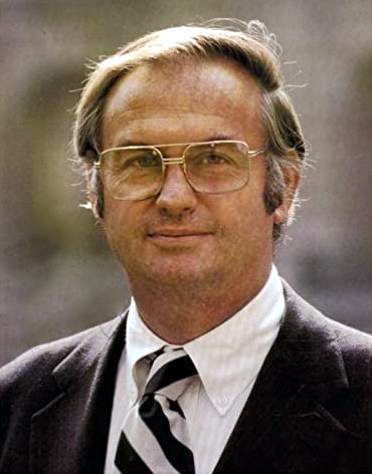

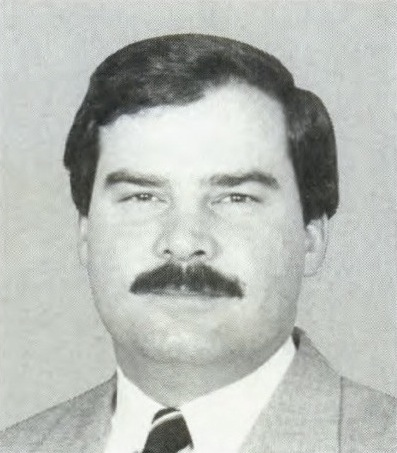

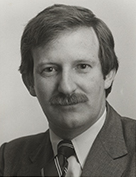
Nominee	Lowell Weicker	John G. Rowland	Bruce Morrison
Party	A Connecticut Party	Republican	Democratic
Running mate	Eunice Groark	Robert Jaekle	Sandra Bender
Popular vote	460,576	427,840	236,641
Percentage	40.4%	37.5%	20.7%
- Weicker: 30–40% 40–50% 50–60% 60–70% Rowland: 30–40% 40–50% 50–60% 60–70% Morrison: 30–40% 50–60%
Governor before election
Bill O'Neill
Democratic
Elected Governor
Lowell Weicker
A Connecticut Party

The 1990 Connecticut gubernatorial election took place on November 6, 1990, to elect the governor of Connecticut. It was a three-way race for a seat left open when Governor William A. O'Neill declined to run for re-election. A Connecticut Party nominee Lowell Weicker narrowly won the election, becoming the first candidate who was not a member of one of the two major parties to win a gubernatorial election since the 1974 election in Maine.

== Florida ==
1990 Florida gubernatorial election
- November 6, 1990
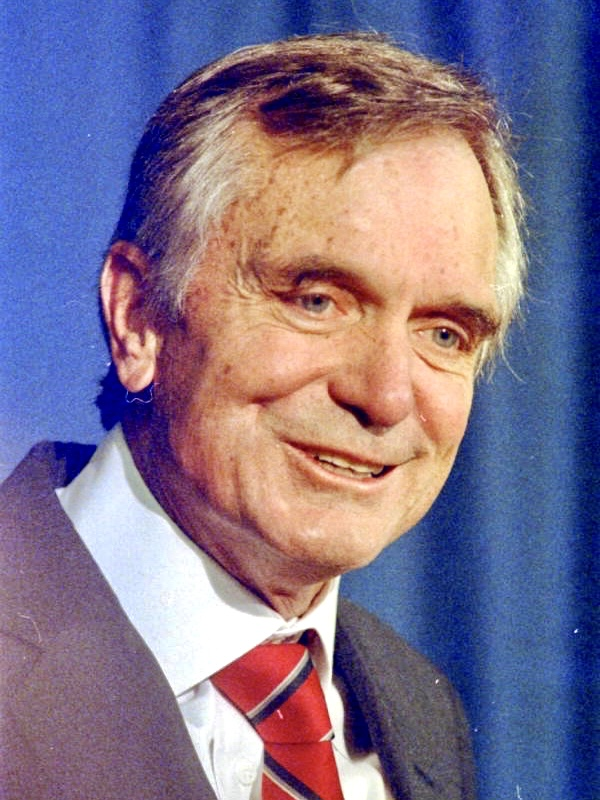

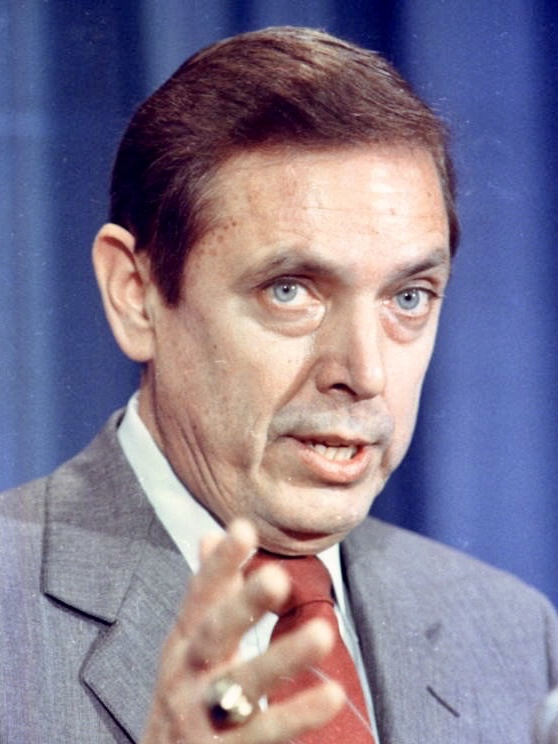
Nominee	Lawton Chiles	Bob Martinez
Party	Democratic	Republican
Running mate	Buddy MacKay	J. Allison DeFoor
Popular vote	1,995,206	1,535,068
Percentage	56.51%	43.49%
- County results Chiles: 50–60% 60–70% 70–80% Martinez: 50–60% 60–70%
Governor before election
Bob Martinez
Republican
Elected Governor
Lawton Chiles
Democratic

The 1990 Florida gubernatorial election took place on November 6, 1990. Incumbent Republican governor Bob Martinez ran for a second term in office, but was defeated by Democratic challenger Lawton Chiles, a former U.S. senator.

== Georgia ==
1990 Georgia gubernatorial election
- November 6, 1990
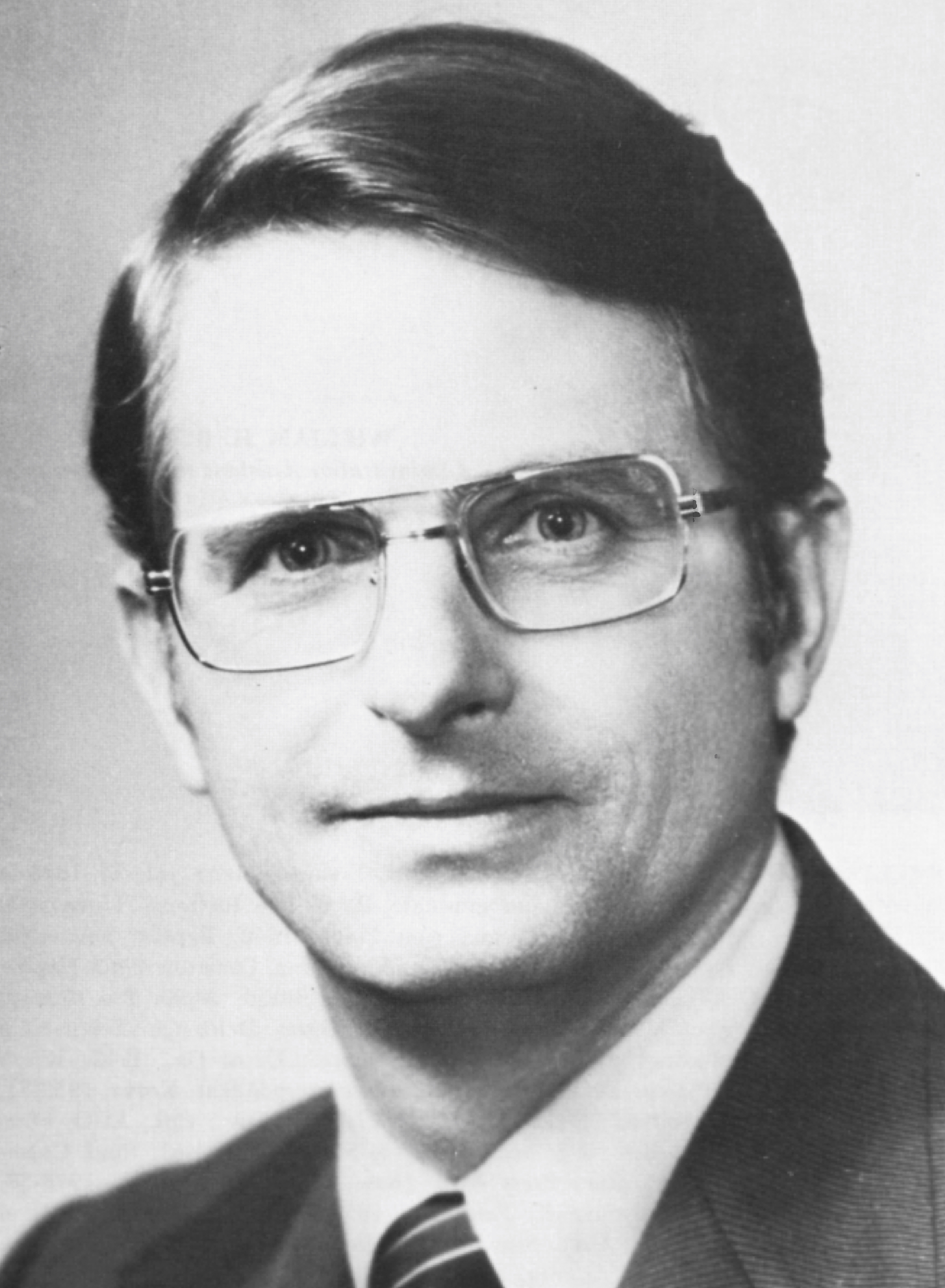

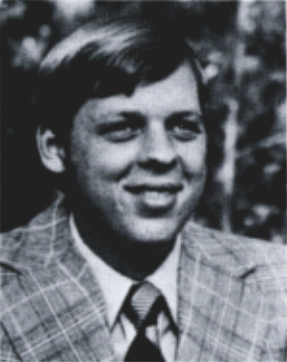
Nominee	Zell Miller	Johnny Isakson
Party	Democratic	Republican
Popular vote	766,662	645,625
Percentage	52.89%	44.54%
- County results Miller: 40–50% 50–60% 60–70% 70–80% Isakson: 50–60% 60–70%
Governor before election
Joe Frank Harris
Democratic
Elected Governor
Zell Miller
Democratic

The 1990 Georgia gubernatorial election was held on November 6, 1990. Lieutenant Governor Zell Miller ran for governor after incumbent Joe Frank Harris was term-limited, defeating Andrew Young, Roy Barnes, and Lester Maddox for the Democratic nomination, and defeated Johnny Isakson, a member of the Georgia House of Representatives.

== Hawaii ==
1990 Hawaii gubernatorial election
- November 6, 1990
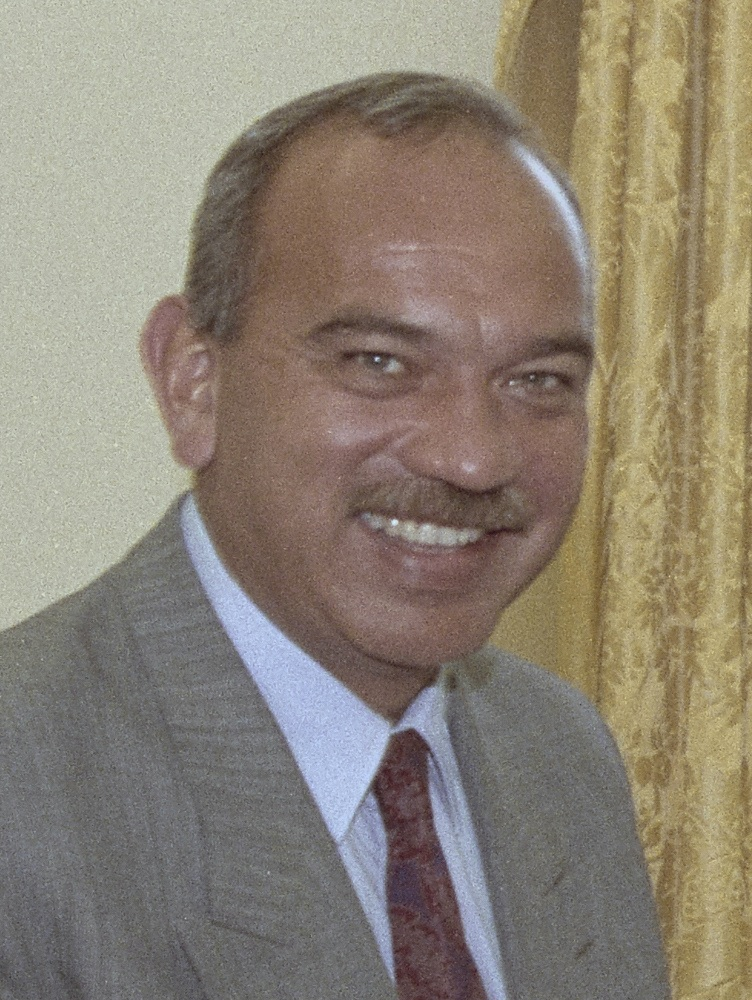

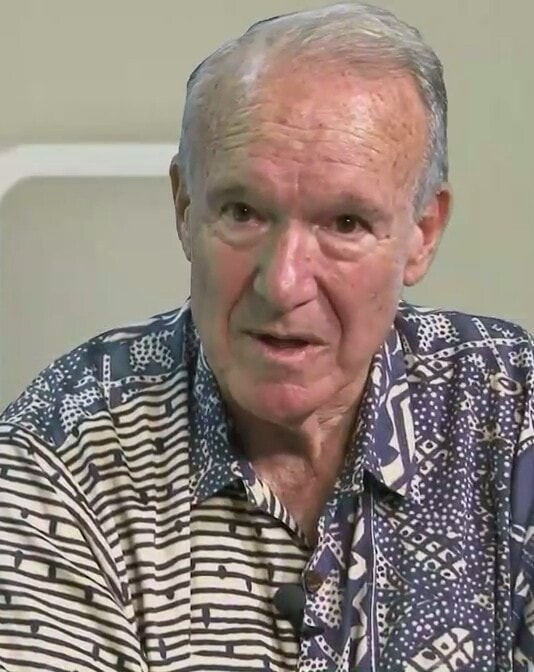
Nominee	John D. Waiheʻe III	Fred Hemmings
Party	Democratic	Republican
Running mate	Ben Cayetano	Billie Beamer
Popular vote	203,491	131,310
Percentage	59.8%	38.6%
- County results Waiheʻe: 50–60% 60–70% 70–80%
Governor before election
John D. Waiheʻe III
Democratic
Elected Governor
John D. Waiheʻe III
Democratic

The 1990 Hawaii gubernatorial election was Hawaii's ninth gubernatorial election. The election was held on November 6, 1990, and resulted in a victory for the Democratic candidate, incumbent Governor John D. Waiheʻe III over the Republican candidate, State Representative Fred Hemmings. Waihee received more votes than Hemmings in every county in the state.

== Idaho ==
1990 Idaho gubernatorial election
- November 6, 1990
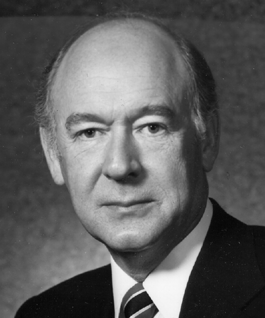

Nominee	Cecil Andrus	Roger Fairchild
Party	Democratic	Republican
Popular vote	218,673	101,937
Percentage	68.2%	31.8%
- County results Andrus: 50–60% 60–70% 70–80% 80–90% Fairchild: 50–60%
Governor before election
Cecil Andrus
Democratic
Elected Governor
Cecil Andrus
Democratic

The 1990 Idaho gubernatorial election was held on November 6, 1990, to elect the Governor of the state of Idaho. Cecil Andrus, the Democratic incumbent, ran for an unprecedented fourth term. Roger Fairchild, a former state senate majority leader from Fruitland, won the Republican nomination in May, but was easily defeated in November by the popular Andrus.

This was the sixth consecutive win for the Democrats, which started with Andrus' first victory twenty years earlier in 1970.

== Illinois ==
1990 Illinois gubernatorial election
- November 6, 1990
- Turnout: 54.00% ▲1.63 pp
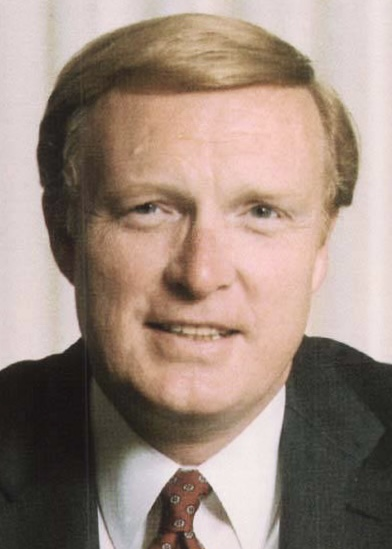
Nominee	Jim Edgar	Neil Hartigan
Party	Republican	Democratic
Running mate	Bob Kustra	Jim Burns
Popular vote	1,653,126	1,569,217
Percentage	50.75%	48.17%
- Edgar: 40–50% 50–60% 60–70% Hartigan: 40–50% 50–60% 60–70% 70–80%
Governor before election
James R. Thompson
Republican
Elected Governor
Jim Edgar
Republican

The 1990 Illinois gubernatorial election was held on November 6, 1990 to elect the governor and lieutenant governor of Illinois. The incumbent Governor Jim Thompson chose to retire instead of seeking reelection to a fifth term. The Republican nominee, Secretary of State Jim Edgar, narrowly defeated the Democratic nominee, Attorney General Neil Hartigan, by about 80,000 votes out of the over 3.2 million cast (a margin of 2.58%).

This was the first open-seat gubernatorial election in Illinois since 1952, which was 38 years previously. A competitive race, it had the narrowest margin of victory for a statewide election in Illinois that cycle and was one of the closest gubernatorial races in the nation that year. At the time, it was the costliest campaign in state history.

== Iowa ==
1990 Iowa gubernatorial election
- November 8, 1990
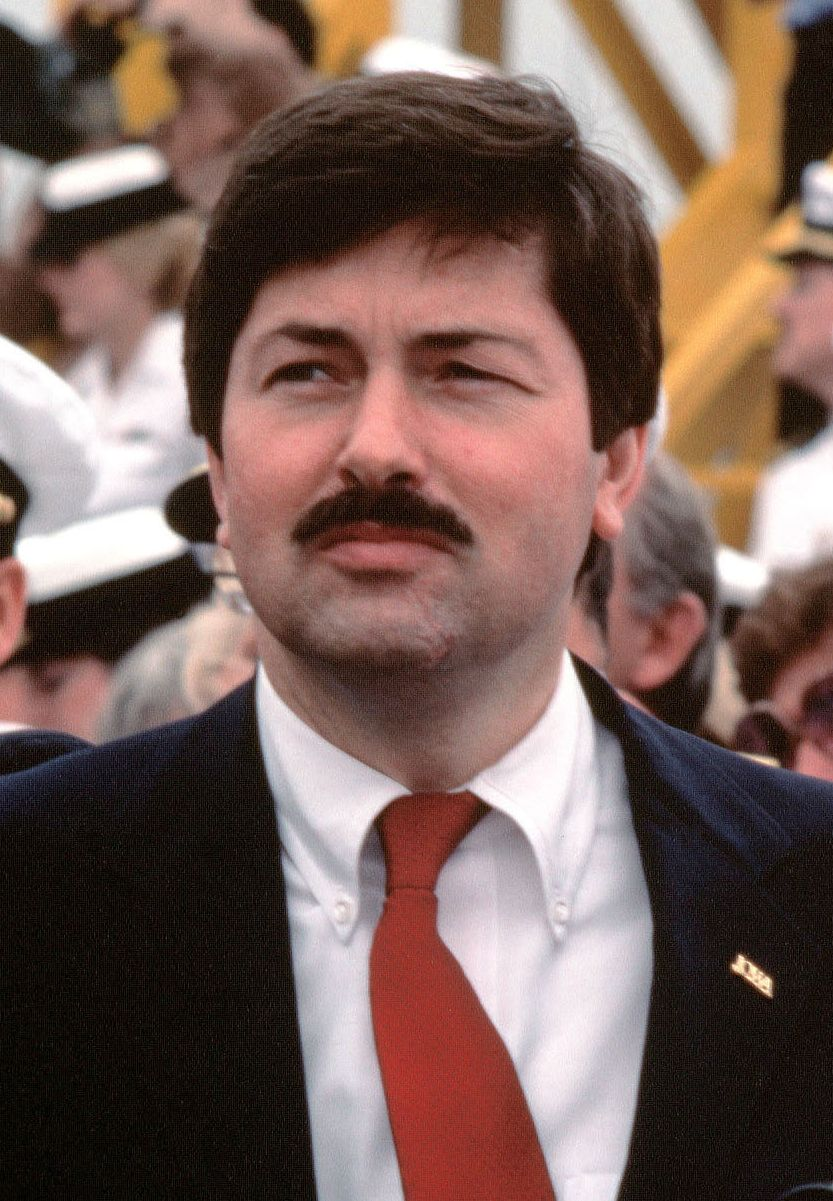

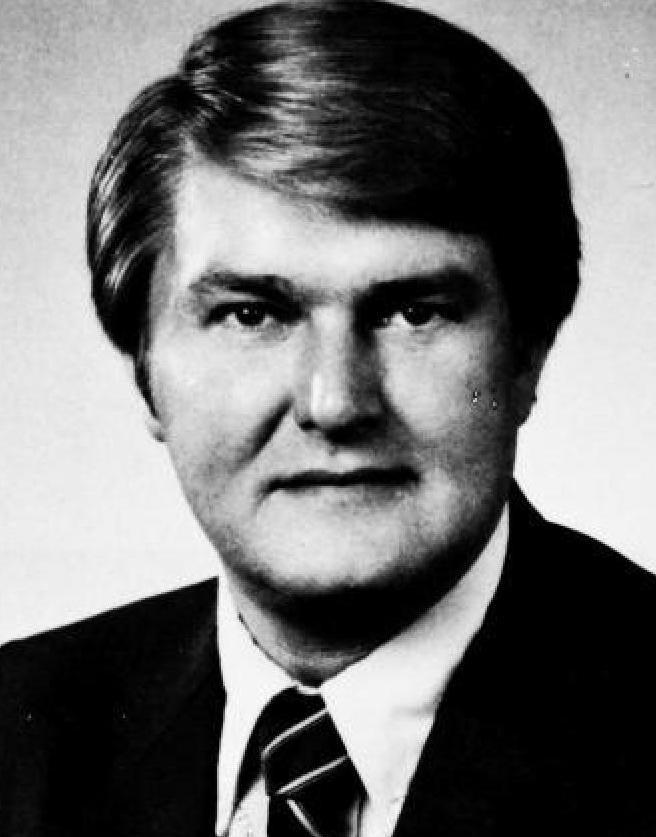
Nominee	Terry Branstad	Donald Avenson
Party	Republican	Democratic
Popular vote	591,852	379,372
Percentage	60.6%	38.9%
- County results Branstad: 50-60% 60-70% 70-80% 80-90% Avenson: 50–60%
Governor before election
Terry Branstad
Republican
Elected Governor
Terry Branstad
Republican

The 1990 Iowa gubernatorial election took place November 8, 1990. Incumbent Republican Governor of Iowa Terry Branstad ran for re-election to a third term as governor. On the Democratic side, state representative Donald Avenson won his party's nomination and both Branstad and Avenson moved on to the general election. Branstad won re-election to a third term as governor, defeating Avenson by a margin of over 20 points.

== Kansas ==
1990 Kansas gubernatorial election
- November 6, 1990
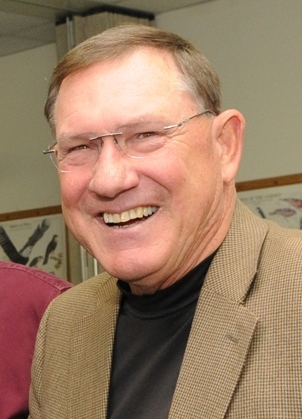

Nominee	Joan Finney	Mike Hayden	Christina Campbell-Cline
Party	Democratic	Republican	Independent
Popular vote	380,609	333,589	69,127
Percentage	48.6%	42.6%	8.8%
- County results Finney: 40–50% 50–60% 60–70% 70–80% Hayden: 40–50% 50–60% 60–70% 70–80%
Governor before election
Mike Hayden
Republican
Elected Governor
Joan Finney
Democratic

The 1990 Kansas gubernatorial election took place on November 6, 1990. Incumbent Republican Governor Mike Hayden lost re-election to Democratic nominee Joan Finney.

== Maine ==
1990 Maine gubernatorial election
- November 6, 1990
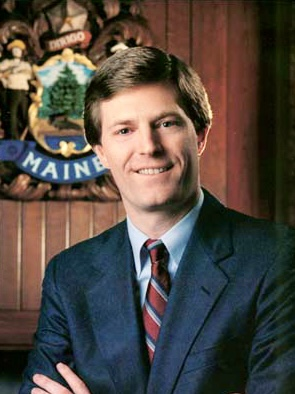

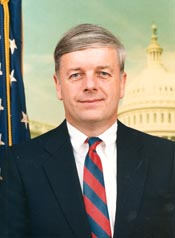

Nominee	John McKernan	Joseph Brennan	Andrew Adam
Party	Republican	Democratic	Independent
Popular vote	243,766	230,038	48,377
Percentage	46.7%	44.1%	9.3%
- McKernan: 40–50% 50–60% 60–70% 70–80% 80–90% >90% Brennan: 40–50% 50–60% 60–70% 70–80% 80–90% >90% Tie: 30–40% 40–50%
Governor before election
John McKernan
Republican
Elected Governor
John McKernan
Republican

The 1990 Maine gubernatorial election took place on November 6, 1990 to elect the governor of Maine. Incumbent Republican governor John McKernan won re-election to a second term, defeating Democratic nominee, former governor Joseph E. Brennan in a tight contest. Independent Andrew Adam took in 9.3% of the vote. Both Brennan and McKernan were unopposed in their respective primaries.

This was the last election until 2010 that Maine elected a Republican governor. This was also the last Maine gubernatorial election until 2022 in which the winner was of the same party as the incumbent president.

== Maryland ==
1990 Maryland gubernatorial election
- November 6, 1990
- Turnout: 54.85%
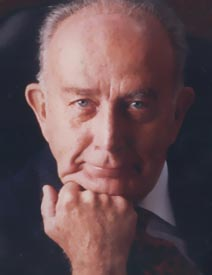

Nominee	William Donald Schaefer	William S. Shepard
Party	Democratic	Republican
Running mate	Melvin Steinberg	Lois Shepard
Popular vote	664,015	446,980
Percentage	59.76%	40.23%
- County results Schaefer: 50-60% 60-70% 70-80% Shepard: 50-60% 60-70%
Governor before election
William Donald Schaefer
Democratic
Elected Governor
William Donald Schaefer
Democratic

The 1990 Maryland gubernatorial election was held on November 6, 1990. Incumbent Democrat William Donald Schaefer defeated Republican nominee William S. Shepard handily (59.76% to 40.23%).

== Massachusetts ==
1990 Massachusetts gubernatorial election
- November 6, 1990
- Turnout: 75.85% ▲18.44
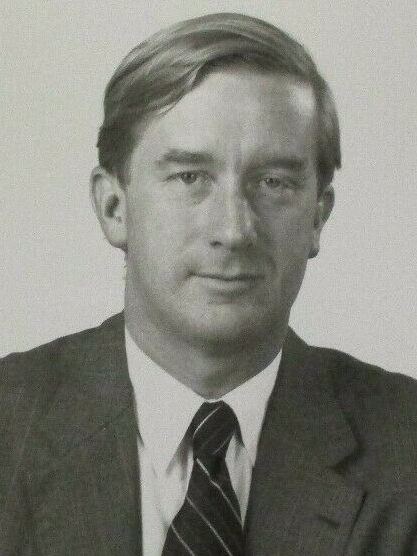

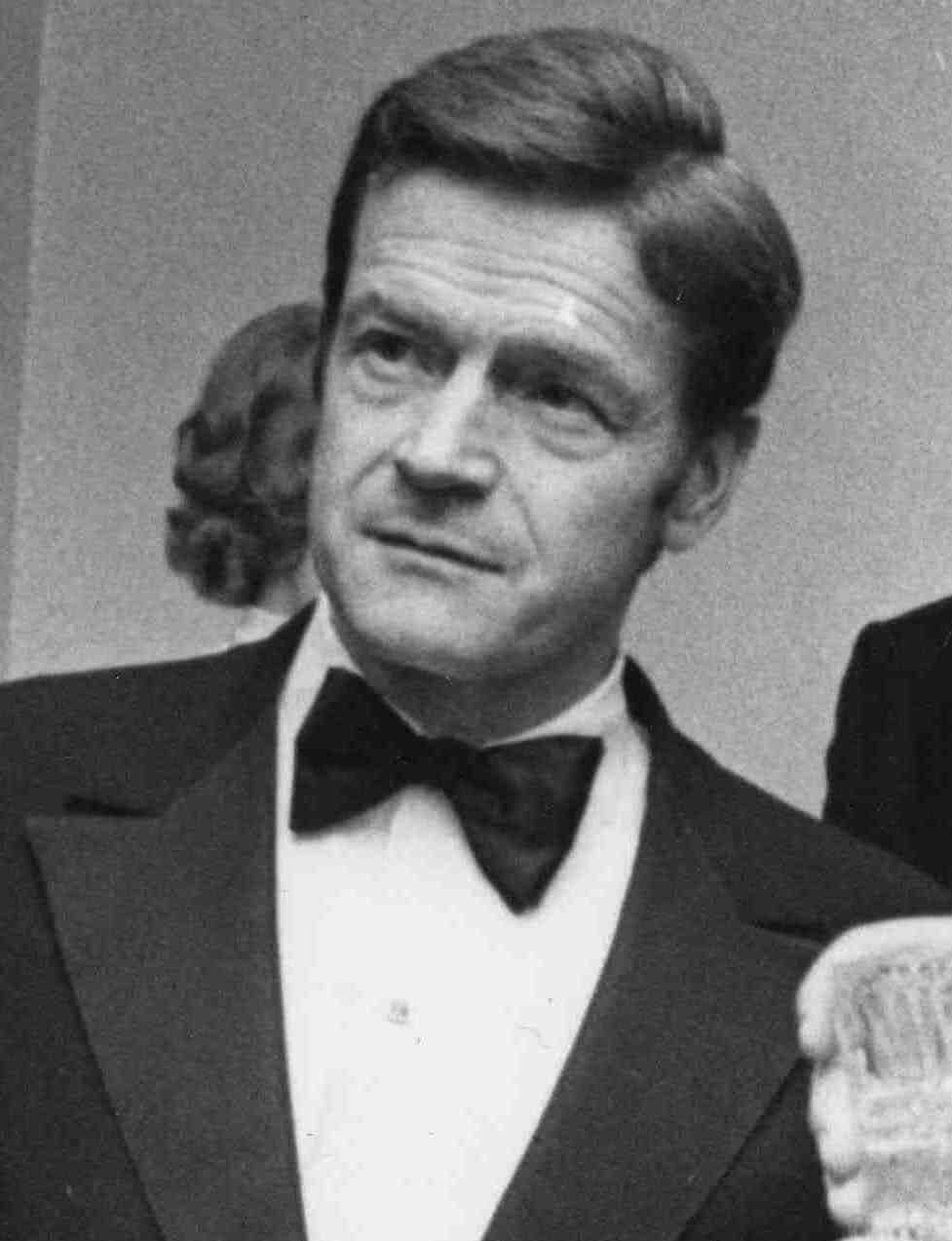
Nominee	Bill Weld	John Silber
Party	Republican	Democratic
Running mate	Paul Cellucci	Marjorie Clapprood
Popular vote	1,175,817	1,099,878
Percentage	50.19%	46.94%
- Weld: 40–50% 50–60% 60–70% 70–80% Silber: 40–50% 50–60% 60–70% 70–80%
Governor before election
Michael Dukakis
Democratic
Elected Governor
Bill Weld
Republican

The 1990 Massachusetts gubernatorial election was held on November 6, 1990. Incumbent Democratic governor Michael Dukakis, his party's nominee for president in 1988, opted to not seek a fourth term. Republican Bill Weld won the open seat, beating Democrat John Silber to become the first Republican governor of Massachusetts elected since 1970. This was the first open-seat gubernatorial election in Massachusetts since 1960.

== Michigan ==
1990 Michigan gubernatorial election
- November 6, 1990
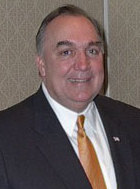

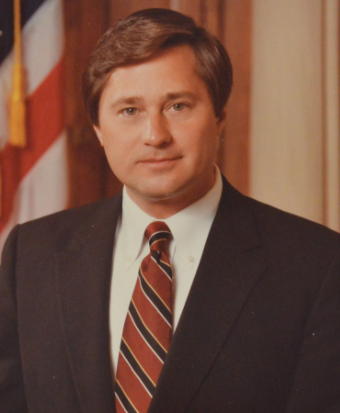
Nominee	John Engler	James Blanchard
Party	Republican	Democratic
Running mate	Connie Binsfeld	Olivia Maynard
Popular vote	1,276,134	1,258,539
Percentage	49.8%	49.1%
- County results Engler: 40-50% 50-60% 60-70% 70-80% Blanchard: 40–50% 50–60% 60–70%
Governor before election
James Blanchard
Democratic
Elected Governor
John Engler
Republican

The 1990 Michigan gubernatorial election was held on November 6, 1990, to elect the Governor and Lieutenant Governor of the state of Michigan. John Engler, a member of the Republican Party and State Senate majority leader, was elected over Democratic Party nominee, incumbent governor James Blanchard, who was seeking his third term.

In what turned out to be one of the closest elections in recent Michigan history, Engler defeated Blanchard by less than 18,000 votes and a 0.7% margin. Engler's victory was considered a major upset and became infamous among pollsters. The final Detroit News poll showed Engler trailing by 14 points, and the final Detroit Free Press poll showed Engler behind by 4 points. A retrospective of the polling suggests the News poll may have had questions that favored Blanchard and too heavily incorporated the opinions of registered voters rather than likely voters, and thus failed to correctly gauge turnout.

== Minnesota ==
1990 Minnesota gubernatorial election
- November 6, 1990
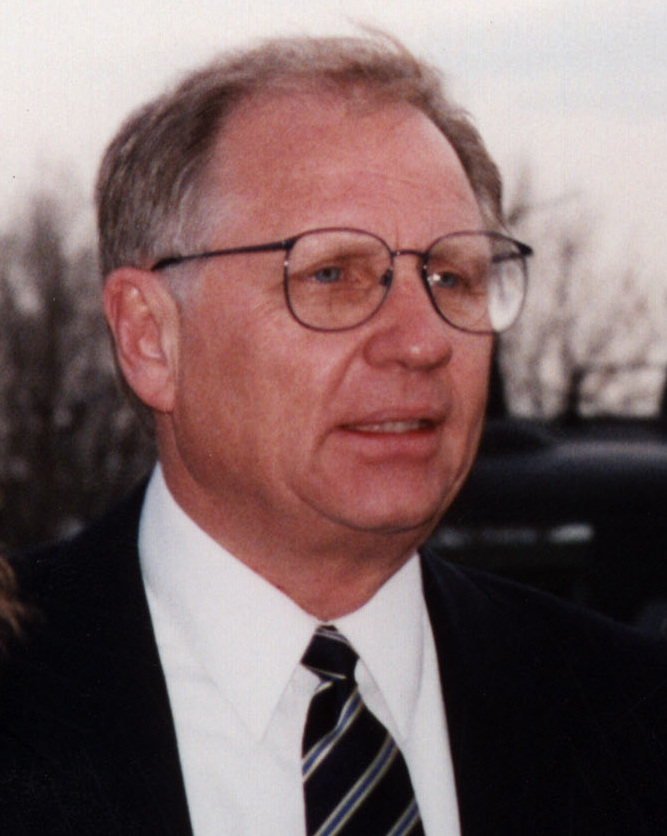

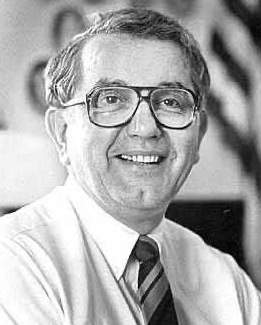
Nominee	Arne Carlson (replacing Jon Grunseth)	Rudy Perpich
Party	Ind.-Republican	Democratic (DFL)
Running mate	Joanell Dyrstad (replacing Sharon Clark)	Marlene Johnson
Popular vote	895,988	836,218
Percentage	50.11%	46.76%
- Carlson: 40–50% 50–60% 60–70% 70–80% 80–90% >90% Perpich: 40–50% 50–60% 60–70% 70–80% 80–90% >90%
Governor before election
Rudy Perpich
Democratic (DFL)
Elected Governor
Arne Carlson
Ind.-Republican

The 1990 Minnesota gubernatorial election took place on November 6, 1990. Independent-Republican Party Auditor Arne Carlson defeated incumbent Minnesota Democratic–Farmer–Labor Party Governor Rudy Perpich. This remains the last gubernatorial election in Minnesota to date in which an incumbent governor ran for reelection to a third consecutive term.

== Nebraska ==
1990 Nebraska gubernatorial election
- November 6, 1990
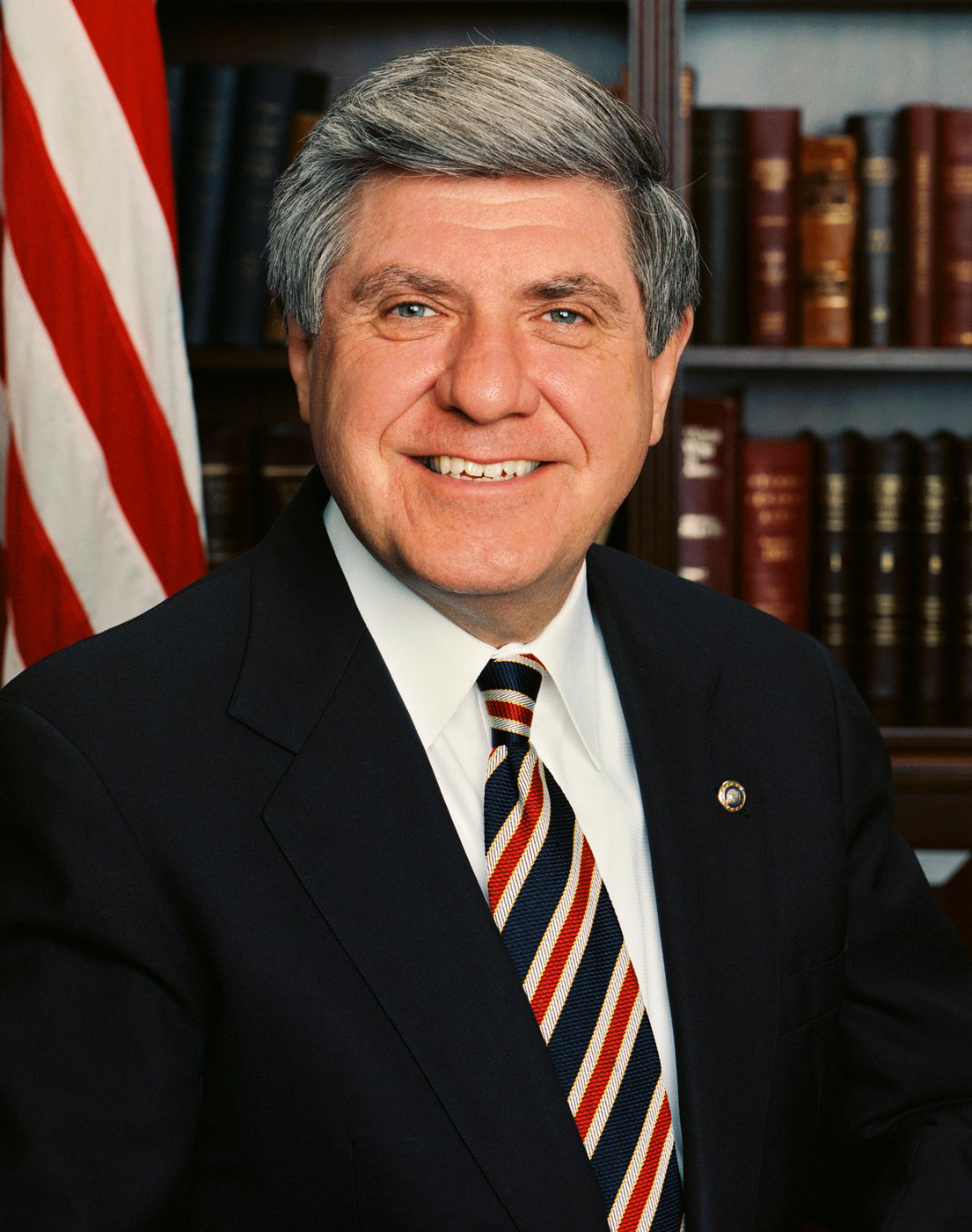

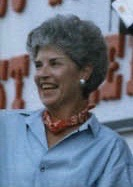
Nominee	Ben Nelson	Kay A. Orr
Party	Democratic	Republican
Running mate	Maxine Moul	Jack Maddux
Popular vote	292,771	288,741
Percentage	49.91%	49.23%
- County results Nelson: 40–50% 50–60% 60–70% Orr: 40–50% 50–60% 60–70% 70–80%
Governor before election
Kay A. Orr
Republican
Elected Governor
Ben Nelson
Democratic

In the 1990 Nebraska gubernatorial election, Democratic challenger Ben Nelson narrowly defeated first-term Republican incumbent Kay Orr for the governorship of the state of Nebraska.

== Nevada ==
1990 Nevada gubernatorial election
- November 6, 1990
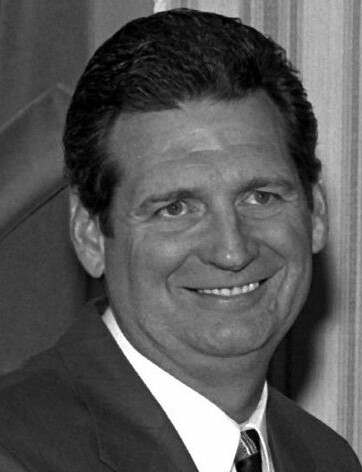

Nominee	Bob Miller	Jim Gallaway
Party	Democratic	Republican
Popular vote	207,878	95,789
Percentage	64.8%	29.9%
- County results Miller: 40–50% 50–60% 60–70%
Governor before election
Bob Miller
Democratic
Elected Governor
Bob Miller
Democratic

The 1990 Nevada gubernatorial election was held on November 6, 1990, to elect the next governor of Nevada, alongside an election to the United States House of Representatives and other state and local elections. Incumbent two-term Democratic Governor Richard Bryan resigned in 1989 after being elected to the United States Senate and under the Nevada succession law, Democrat Lieutenant Governor Bob Miller became the next governor. Miller won in a landslide victory to a full term, defeating Republican nominee Jim Gallaway.

== New Hampshire ==
1990 New Hampshire gubernatorial election
- November 6, 1990

Nominee	Judd Gregg	J. Joseph Grandmaison
Party	Republican	Democratic
Popular vote	177,773	101,923
Percentage	60.26%	34.55%
- County results Gregg: 50-60% 60-70% 70-80% Grandmaison: 40–50%
Governor before election
Judd Gregg
Republican
Elected Governor
Judd Gregg
Republican

The 1990 New Hampshire gubernatorial election took place on November 6, 1990. Incumbent Governor Judd Gregg won reelection to a second term that would be his last, as he ran for and won election to the United States Senate in 1992.

== New Mexico ==
1990 New Mexico gubernatorial election
- November 6, 1990
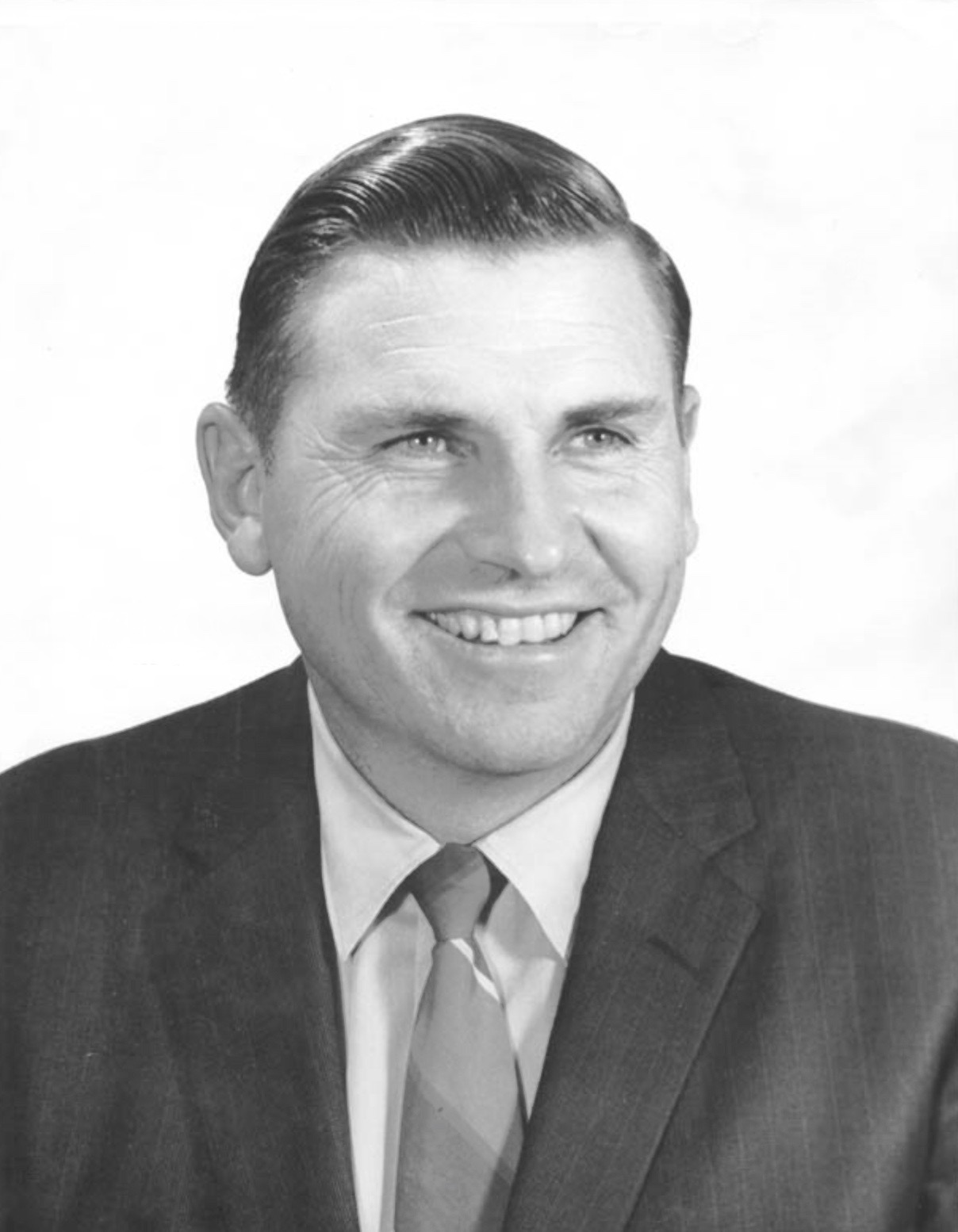

Nominee	Bruce King	Frank Bond
Party	Democratic	Republican
Running mate	Casey Luna	Mary L. Thompson
Popular vote	224,564	185,692
Percentage	54.61%	45.15%
- County results King: 50–60% 60–70% 70–80% Bond: 50–60% 60–70%
Governor before election
Garrey Carruthers
Republican
Elected Governor
Bruce King
Democratic

The 1990 New Mexico gubernatorial election took place on November 6, 1990, in order to elect the Governor of New Mexico. Due to term limits, incumbent Republican Garrey Carruthers was ineligible to seek a second term as governor. (Note: New Mexico's constitution was amended at the general election in 1986 to abolish the ban on consecutive terms for executive officers, but that amendment only applied for those elected starting in 1990.) Democrat Bruce King won his third and final term overall as governor, defeating Republican Frank Bond. King won the largest share of the vote out of his four gubernatorial campaigns. This is the most recent election in which Catron County has voted for a Democratic gubernatorial candidate.

== New York ==
1990 New York gubernatorial election
- November 6, 1990
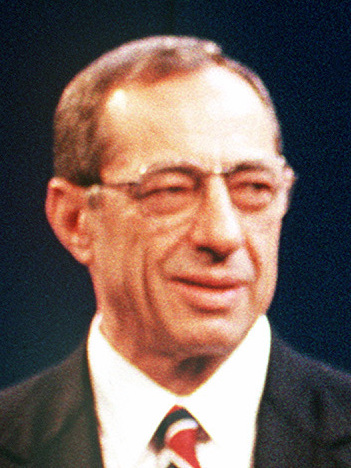

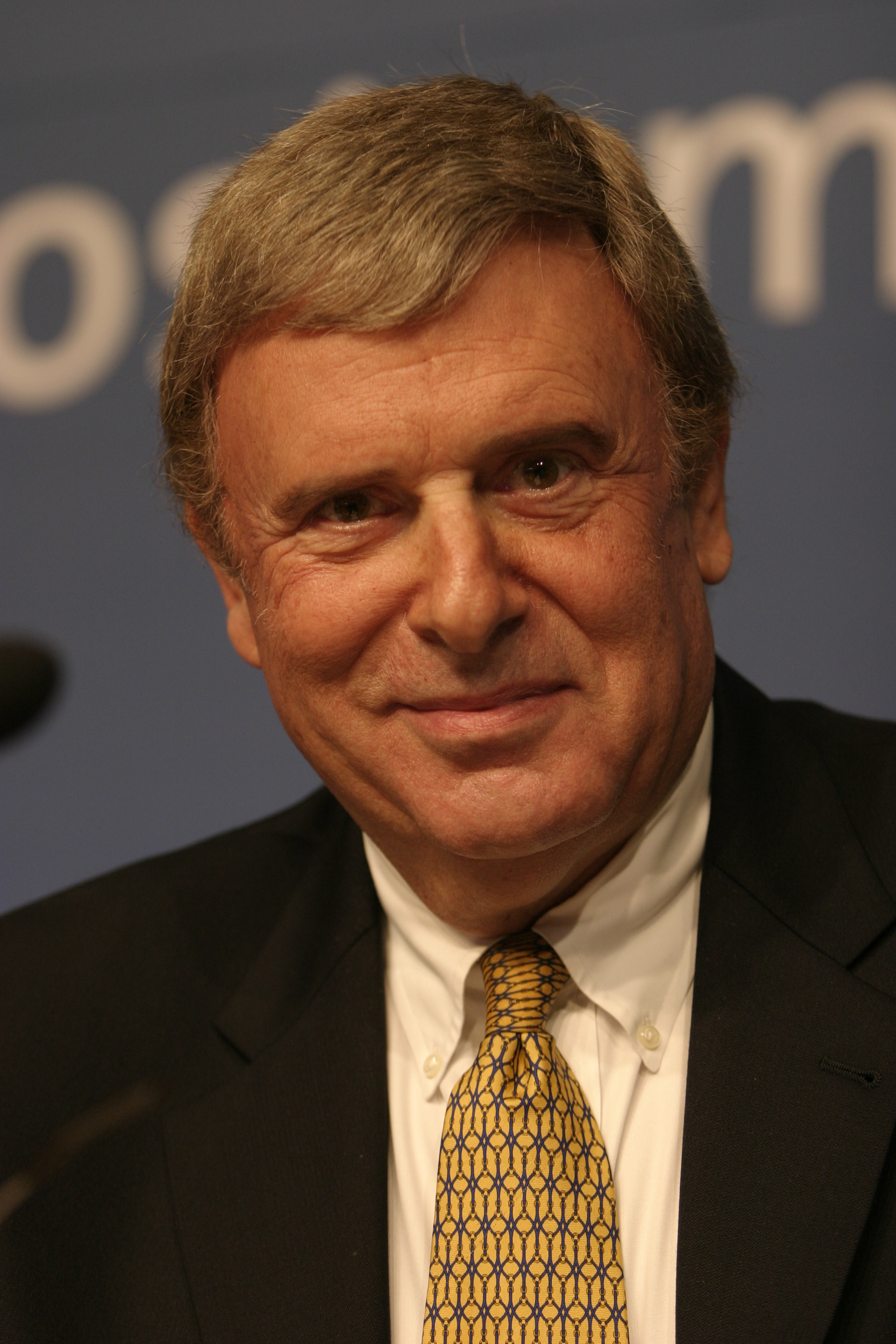
Nominee	Mario Cuomo	Pierre Rinfret	Herbert London
Party	Democratic	Republican	Conservative
Alliance	Liberal
Running mate	Stan Lundine	Geff Yancey	Anthony DiPerna
Popular vote	2,157,087	865,948	827,614
Percentage	53.17%	21.35%	20.40%
- Cuomo: 30–40% 40–50% 50–60% 60–70% 70–80% Rinfret: 30–40% 40–50% London: 30–40% 40–50% Tie: 30–40% 40–50%
Governor before election
Mario Cuomo
Democratic
Elected Governor
Mario Cuomo
Democratic

The 1990 New York gubernatorial election was held on November 6, 1990, to elect the governor and Lieutenant Governor of New York. Democratic governor Mario Cuomo won a third term in office, making him the first Democrat elected to three terms as Governor of New York since Herbert H. Lehman.

== Ohio ==
1990 Ohio gubernatorial election
- November 6, 1990
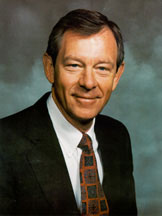

Nominee	George Voinovich	Anthony J. Celebrezze Jr.
Party	Republican	Democratic
Popular vote	1,938,103	1,539,416
Percentage	55.7%	44.3%
- Voinovich: 50–60% 60–70% 70–80% 80–90% Celebrezze: 50–60% 60–70% 70–80%
Governor before election
Dick Celeste
Democratic
Elected Governor
George Voinovich
Republican

The 1990 Ohio gubernatorial election was held on November 6, 1990. Incumbent Democratic governor Dick Celeste was unable to run for a third consecutive term due to term limits. Former mayor of Cleveland George Voinovich, who also ran for the United States Senate in 1988, was uncontested for the Republican nomination, while Ohio Attorney General Anthony J. Celebrezze Jr. emerged from the Democratic primary. In the end, Voinovich was able to defeat Celebrezze by a fairly wide margin, winning his first term in office.

== Oklahoma ==
1990 Oklahoma gubernatorial election
- November 6, 1990
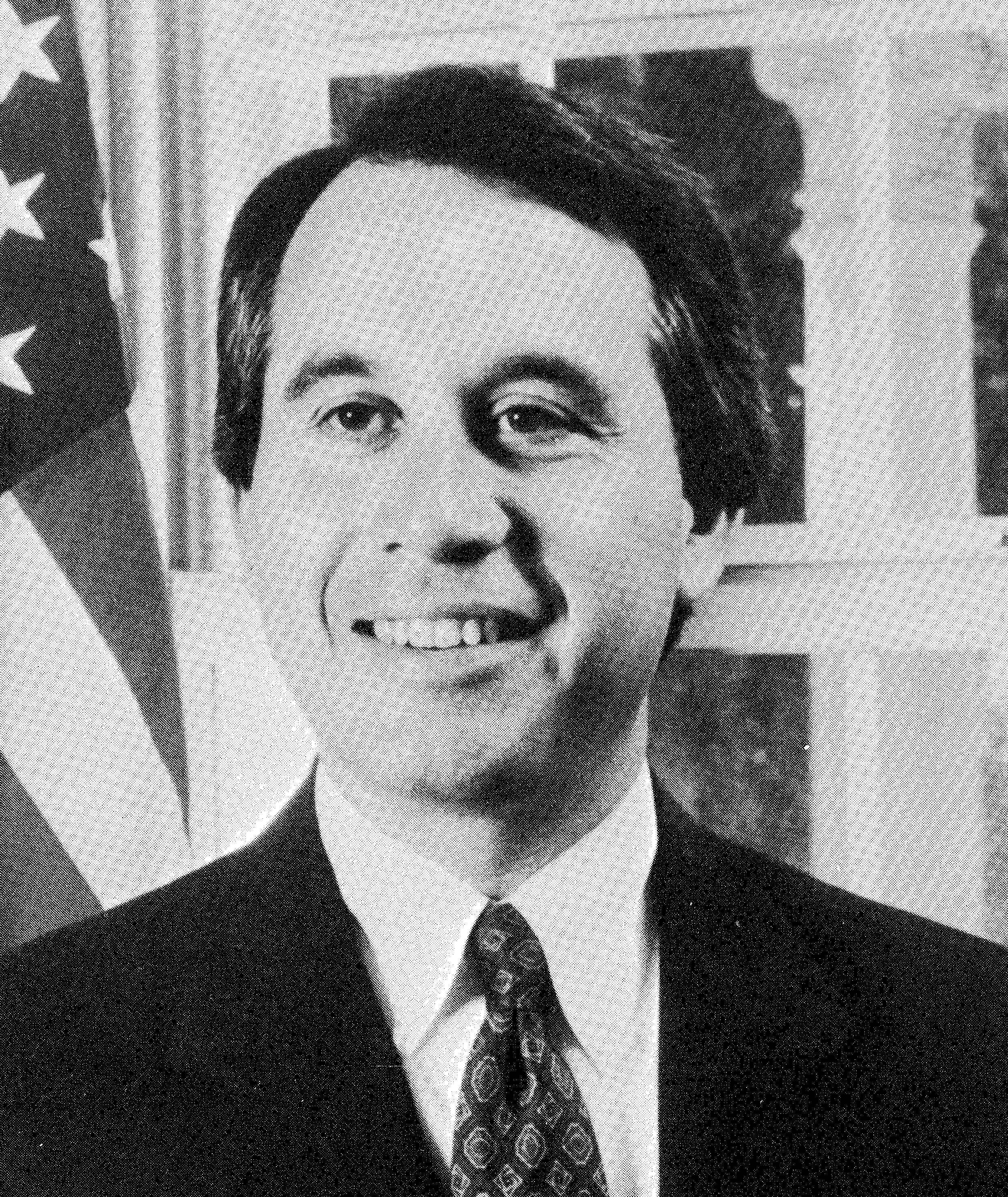

Nominee	David Walters	Bill Price	Thomas Ledgerwood
Party	Democratic	Republican	Independent
Popular vote	523,196	297,584	90,534
Percentage	57.4%	32.7%	9.9%
- County results Walters: 40–50% 50–60% 60–70% 70–80% Price: 40–50% 50–60%
Governor before election
Henry Bellmon
Republican
Elected Governor
David Walters
Democratic

The 1990 Oklahoma gubernatorial election was held on November 6, 1990, to elect the governor of Oklahoma. Democratic businessman David Walters won the election easily despite his lack of political experience.

== Oregon ==
1990 Oregon gubernatorial election
- November 7, 1990
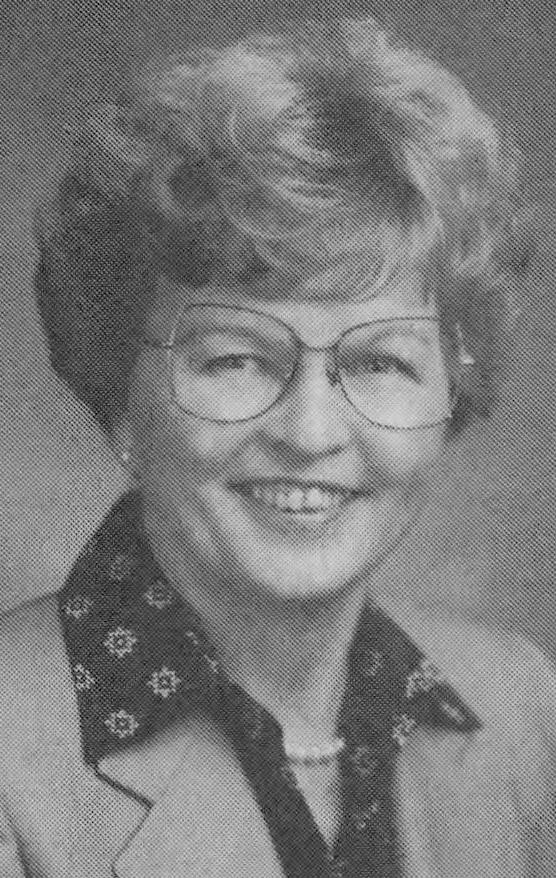

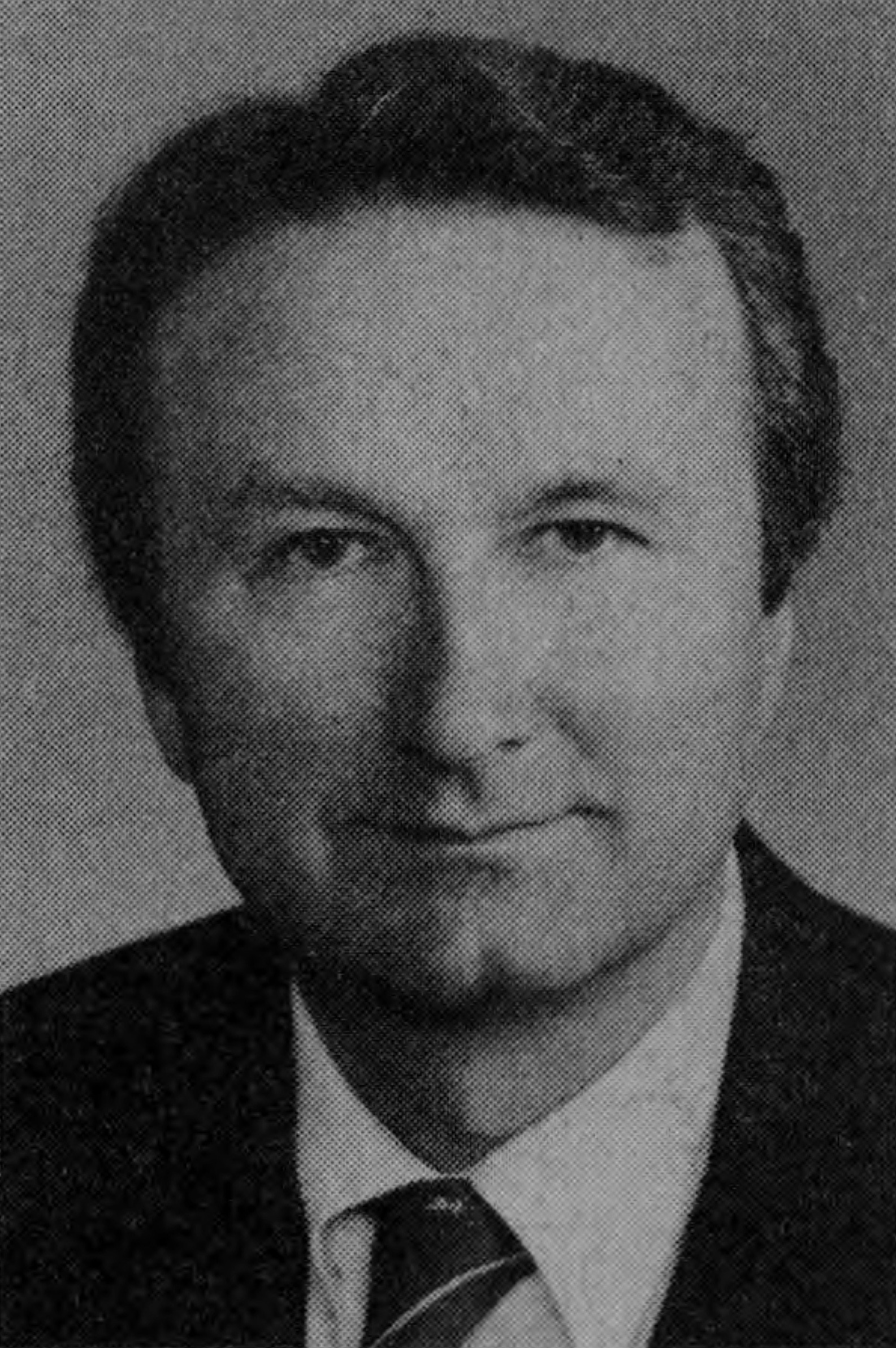

Nominee	Barbara Roberts	David Frohnmayer	Al Mobley
Party	Democratic	Republican	Independent
Popular vote	508,749	444,646	144,062
Percentage	45.7%	40.0%	13.0%
- County results Roberts: 40–50% 50–60% Frohnmayer: 30–40% 40–50% 50–60%
Governor before election
Neil Goldschmidt
Democratic
Elected Governor
Barbara Roberts
Democratic

The 1990 Oregon gubernatorial election took place on November 7, 1990. Democratic nominee Barbara Roberts defeated Republican David B. Frohnmayer and Independent Al Mobley to win the election.

== Pennsylvania ==
1990 Pennsylvania gubernatorial election
- November 6, 1990
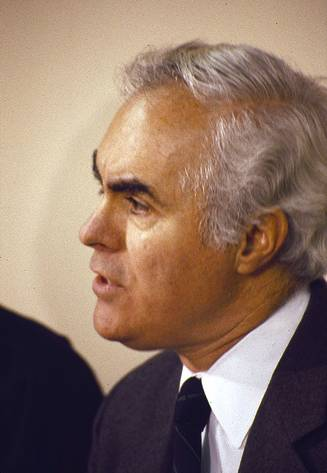

Nominee	Bob Casey	Barbara Hafer
Party	Democratic	Republican
Running mate	Mark Singel	Harold Mowery
Popular vote	2,065,244	987,516
Percentage	67.63%	32.34%
- Casey: 50–60% 60–70% 70–80% 80–90% >90% Hafer: 40-50% 50–60% 60-70% 80-90% Tie: 40-50% 50% No data
Governor before election
Robert P. Casey
Democratic
Elected Governor
Robert P. Casey
Democratic

The 1990 Pennsylvania gubernatorial election was held on November 6, 1990. Incumbent Democratic governor Robert P. Casey easily defeated Republican Barbara Hafer. Governor Casey defeated Hafer by a margin of 35.29%, and carried 66 out of 67 Pennsylvania counties.

== Rhode Island ==
1990 Rhode Island gubernatorial election
- November 6, 1990
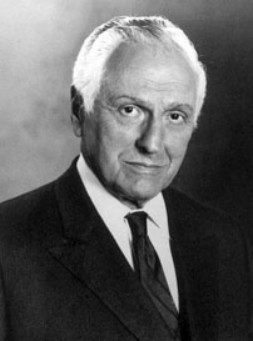

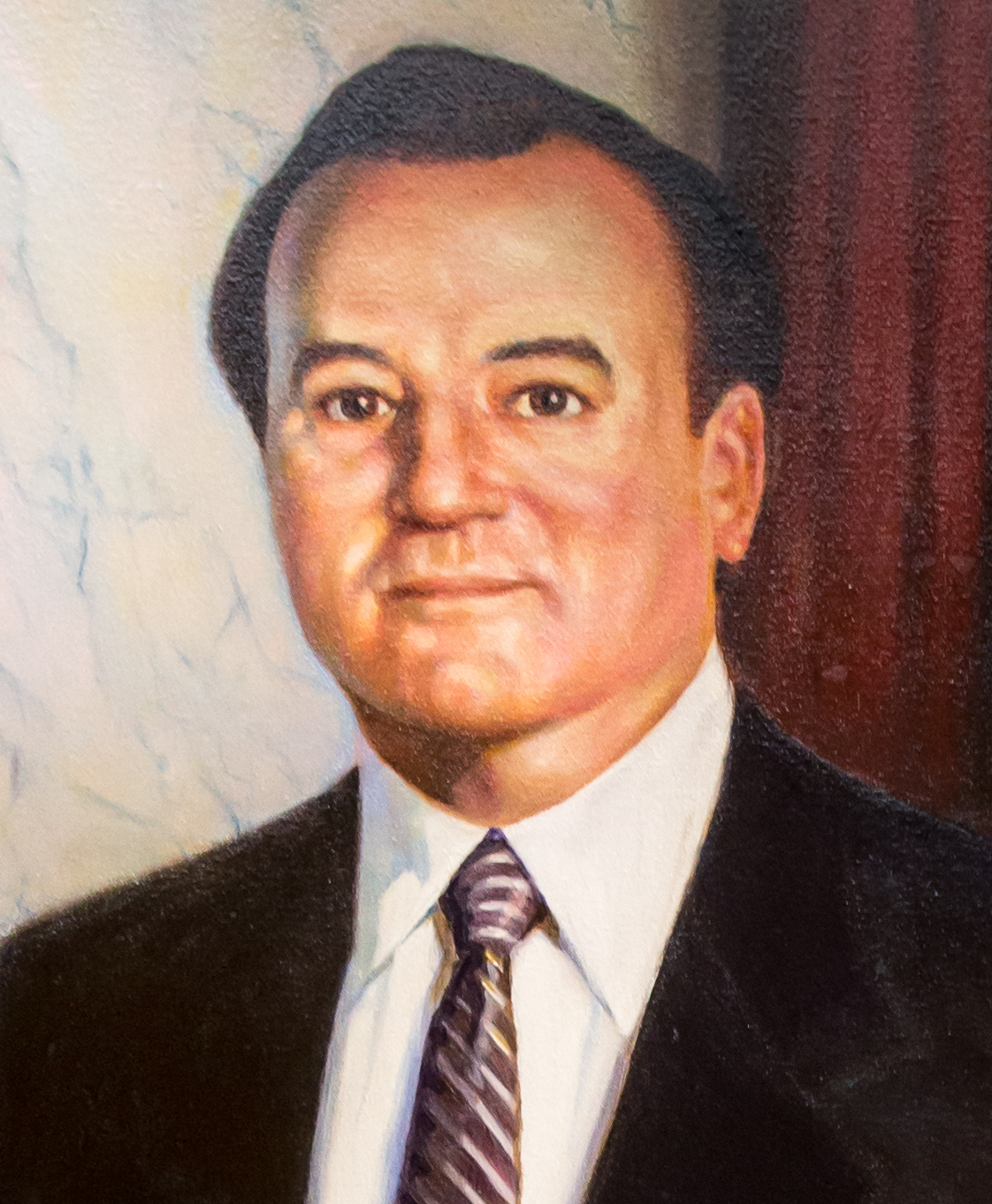
Nominee	Bruce Sundlun	Edward D. DiPrete
Party	Democratic	Republican
Popular vote	264,411	92,177
Percentage	74.2%	25.8%
- Sundlun: 60–70% 70–80% 80–90%
Governor before election
Edward D. DiPrete
Republican
Elected Governor
Bruce Sundlun
Democratic

The 1990 Rhode Island gubernatorial election was held on November 6, 1990. Democratic nominee Bruce Sundlun defeated incumbent Republican Edward D. DiPrete with 74.15% of the vote.

== South Carolina ==
1990 South Carolina gubernatorial election
- November 6, 1990
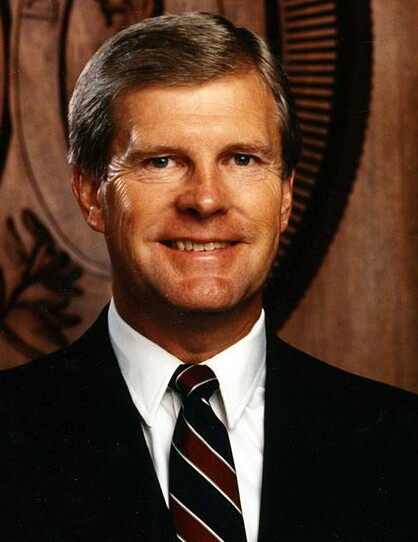

Nominee	Carroll Campbell	Theo Mitchell
Party	Republican	Democratic
Popular vote	528,831	212,048
Percentage	69.5%	27.8%
- County results Campbell: 40–50% 50–60% 60–70% 70–80% 80–90% Mitchell: 50–60%
Governor before election
Carroll A. Campbell Jr.
Republican
Elected Governor
Carroll A. Campbell Jr.
Republican

The 1990 South Carolina gubernatorial election was held on November 6, 1990 to select the governor of the state of South Carolina. Governor Carroll A. Campbell Jr., the popular Republican incumbent, handily defeated Democrat Theo Mitchell to become only the second governor at the time elected to a second consecutive four-year term.

== South Dakota ==
1990 South Dakota gubernatorial election
- November 6, 1990
- Turnout: 61.07% (voting eligible)
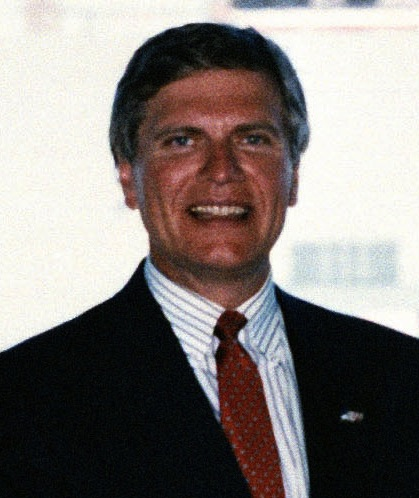

Nominee	George Mickelson	Bob Samuelson
Party	Republican	Democratic
Running mate	Walter Dale Miller	Shirley Halleen
Popular vote	151,198	105,525
Percentage	58.9%	41.1%
- County results Mickelson: 50–60% 60–70% Samuelson: 50–60% 60–70%
Governor before election
George Mickelson
Republican
Elected Governor
George Mickelson
Republican

The 1990 South Dakota gubernatorial election took place on November 6, 1990, to elect a governor of South Dakota. Republican governor George S. Mickelson was re-elected, defeating Democratic nominee Bob L. Samuelson. Mickelson died in a plane crash near Zwingle, Iowa on April 19, 1993.

== Tennessee ==
1990 Tennessee gubernatorial election
- November 6, 1990
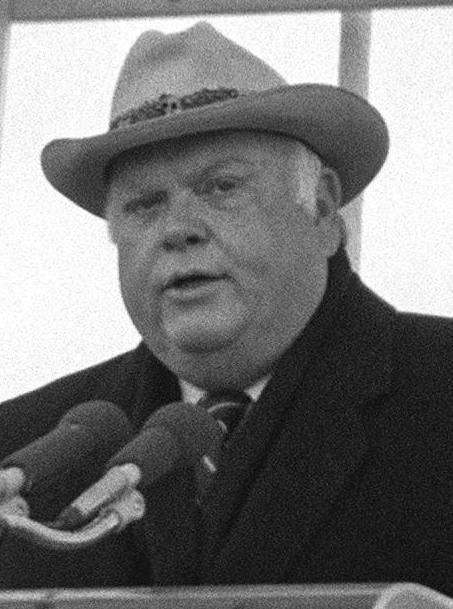

Nominee	Ned McWherter	Dwight Henry
Party	Democratic	Republican
Popular vote	479,990	288,904
Percentage	60.83%	36.61%
- County results McWherter: 40–50% 50–60% 60–70% 70–80% 80–90% Henry: 40–50% 50–60% Tie: 40–50%
Governor before election
Ned McWherter
Democratic
Elected Governor
Ned McWherter
Democratic

The 1990 Tennessee gubernatorial election took place on November 6, 1990, to elect the governor of Tennessee. Incumbent Democratic governor Ned McWherter was re-elected, defeating his Republican opponent Dwight Henry, a one term member of the Tennessee House of Representatives. McWherter received 60.8% of the vote.

== Texas ==
1990 Texas gubernatorial election
- November 6, 1990
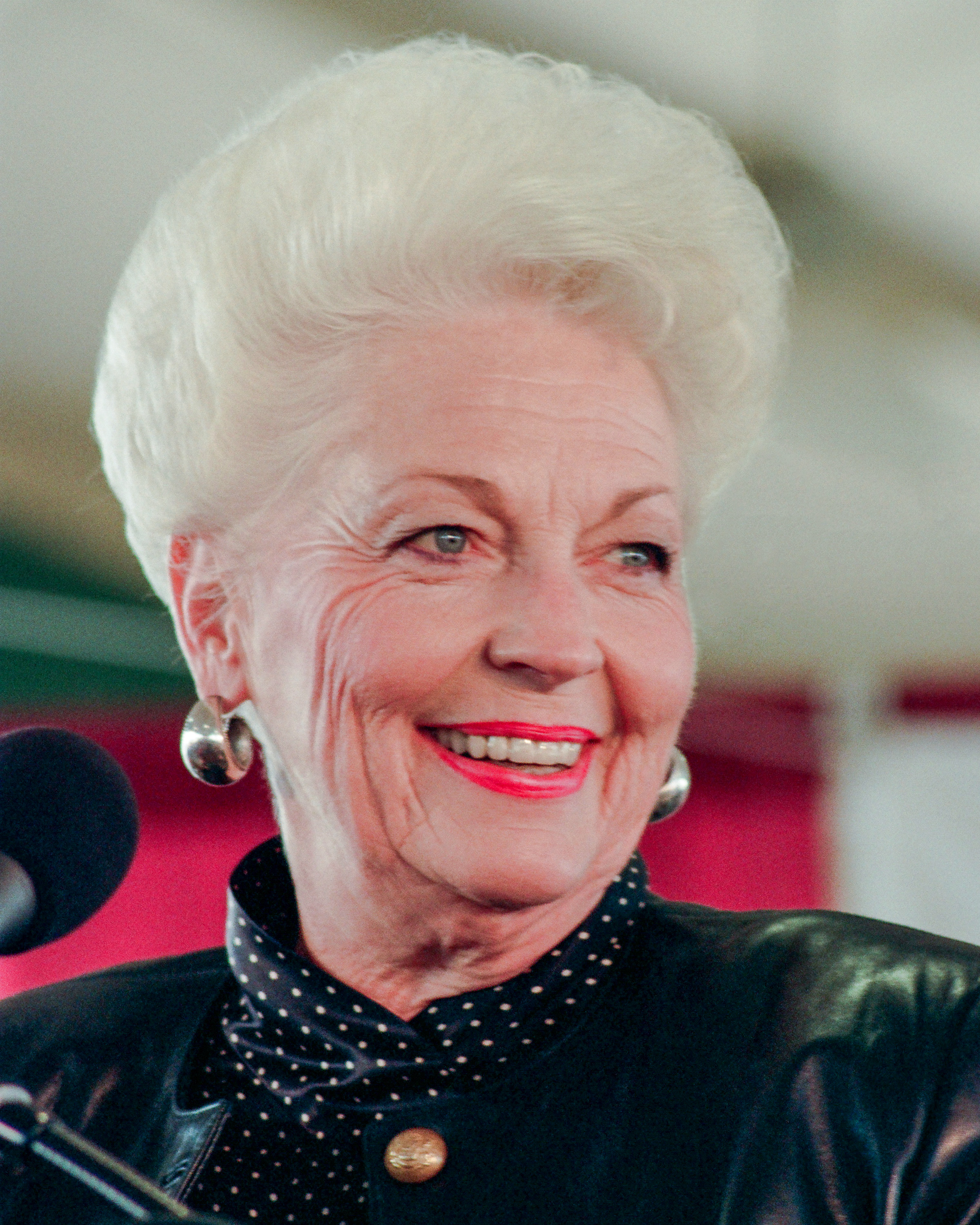

Nominee	Ann Richards	Clayton Williams
Party	Democratic	Republican
Popular vote	1,925,670	1,826,431
Percentage	49.5%	46.9%
- County results Richards: 40–50% 50–60% 60–70% 70–80% 80–90% Williams: 40–50% 50–60% 60–70% 70–80%
Governor before election
Bill Clements
Republican
Elected Governor
Ann Richards
Democratic

The 1990 Texas gubernatorial election was held on November 6, 1990, to elect the governor of Texas. Incumbent Republican governor Bill Clements did not run for re-election, so the election pitted Democrat Ann Richards against Republican Clayton Williams. Richards narrowly defeated Williams on Election Day, winning 49.5% of the vote to Williams' 46.9%.

== Vermont ==
1990 Vermont gubernatorial election
- November 6, 1990
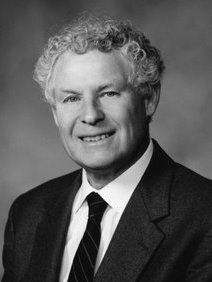

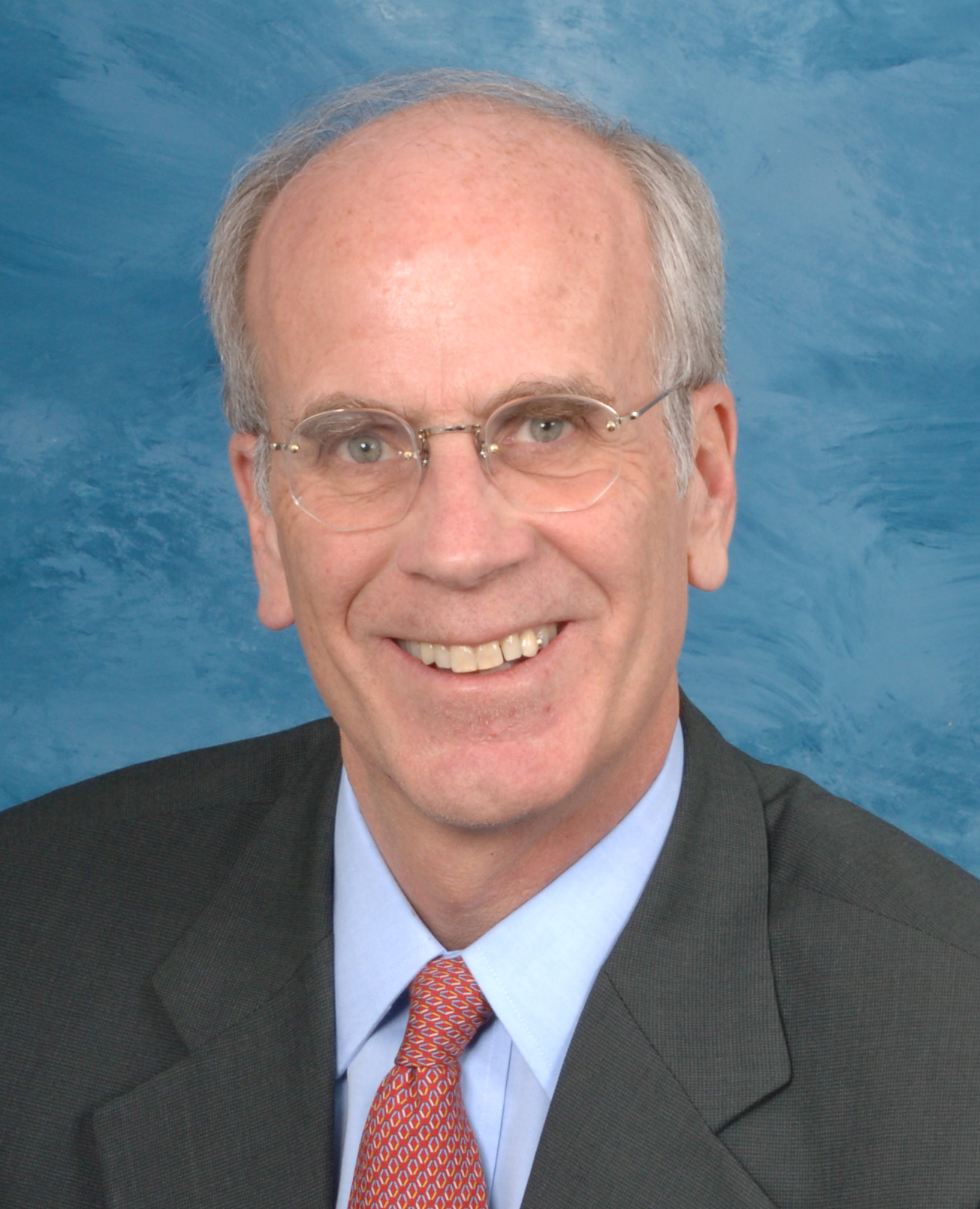
Nominee	Richard Snelling	Peter Welch
Party	Republican	Democratic
Popular vote	109,540	97,321
Percentage	51.8%	46.0%
- Snelling: 40-50% 50-60% 60-70% 70-80% 80-90% Welch: 40-50% 50-60% 60-70%
Governor before election
Madeleine Kunin
Democratic
Elected Governor
Richard Snelling
Republican

The 1990 Vermont gubernatorial election took place on November 6, 1990. Incumbent Democratic Governor Madeleine Kunin did not seek re-election. Former Governor Republican Richard Snelling defeated Democratic former State Senate President pro tempore Peter Welch in the general election. This would be the last Republican victory in a Vermont gubernatorial election until 2002.

== Wisconsin ==
1990 Wisconsin gubernatorial election
- November 6, 1990
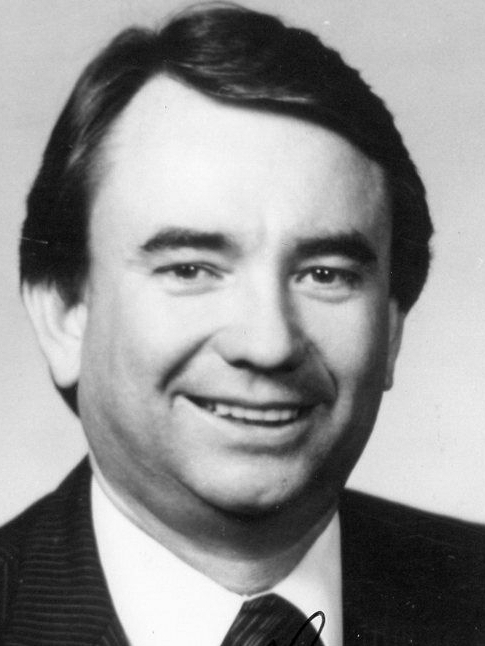

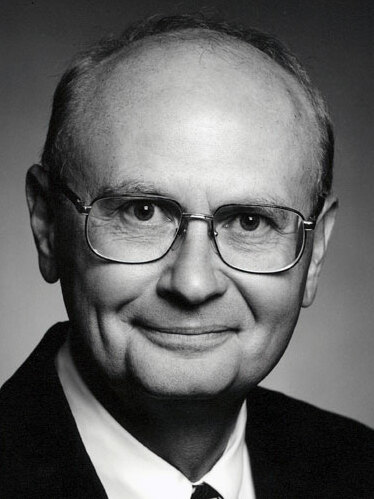
Nominee	Tommy Thompson	Thomas A. Loftus
Party	Republican	Democratic
Running mate	Scott McCallum	Joseph Czarnezki
Popular vote	802,321	576,280
Percentage	58.15%	41.77%
- Thompson: 40–50% 50–60% 60–70% 70–80% 80–90% >90% Loftus: 40–50% 50–60% 60–70% 70–80% 80–90% >90% Tie
Governor before election
Tommy G. Thompson
Republican
Elected Governor
Tommy G. Thompson
Republican

The 1990 Wisconsin gubernatorial election was held on November 6, 1990. Incumbent Republican governor Tommy Thompson won the election with 58% of the vote, winning a second term as Governor of Wisconsin. The primary elections were held on September 11, 1990.

== Wyoming ==
1990 Wyoming gubernatorial election
- November 6, 1990
- Turnout: 71.99% Registered ▲2.00% 35.30% of Total Population ▲0.22%
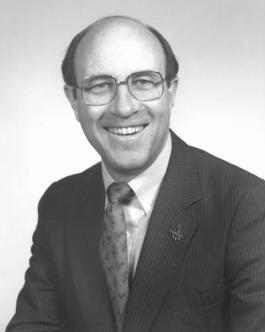

Nominee	Mike Sullivan	Mary Mead
Party	Democratic	Republican
Popular vote	104,638	55,471
Percentage	65.35%	34.65%
- County results Sullivan: 50–60% 60–70% 70–80% Mead: 50–60%
Governor before election
Mike Sullivan
Democratic
Elected Governor
Mike Sullivan
Democratic

The 1990 Wyoming gubernatorial election took place on November 6, 1990. Incumbent Democratic Governor Mike Sullivan ran for re-election. In the general election, he faced Republican nominee Mary Mead, a businesswoman and the daughter of former U.S. Senator and Governor Clifford Hansen.

== Territories and federal district ==
=== District of Columbia ===
1990 United States gubernatorial elections
- November 6, 1990
- Turnout: 26.8%
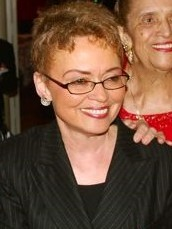

Nominee	Sharon Pratt Dixon	Maurice Turner
Party	Democratic	Republican
Popular vote	92,504	18,653
Percentage	86.1%	11.5%
- Results by ward Dixon: 80–90% >90%
Mayor before election
Marion Barry
Democratic
Elected mayor
Sharon Pratt Dixon
Democratic

On November 6, 1990, Washington, D.C., held an election for its mayor, with Democratic candidate Sharon Pratt Dixon defeating Republican Maurice Turner.

Sharon Pratt Dixon announced at the 1988 Democratic National Convention that she would challenge incumbent mayor Marion Barry in the 1990 election. Pratt was the only candidate to have officially announced her plans to run for mayor when Barry was arrested on drug charges and dropped out of the race in early 1990. Shortly thereafter, the race was joined by longtime councilmembers John Ray, Charlene Drew Jarvis and David Clarke. Pratt criticized her three main opponents, referring to them as the "three blind mice" who "saw nothing, said nothing and did nothing as the city rapidly decayed." She was the only candidate who called on Barry to resign from office, and ran specifically as an outsider to his political machine with the campaign slogan of "Clean House."

Following a series of televised debates during the last few weeks of the campaign, Pratt received the endorsement of The Washington Post. The day the endorsement appeared, her poll numbers skyrocketed, with many political observers attributing the rise specifically to the Post's backing. On the eve of the election, polls showed Councilmember John Ray holding the lead, but Pratt gaining ground fast and a large margin of undecided voters remaining. However, even with the smallest campaign staff and least money, Pratt won the election, defeating second-place Ray by 10%. As Washington is a heavily Democratic city, Dixon's victory over Republican former police chief Maurice T. Turner, Jr., in the November 6 general election was a foregone conclusion.

=== Guam ===
1990 Guamanian gubernatorial election
Party	Candidate	Votes	%
Republican	Joseph Franklin Ada Frank Blas	20,677	53.08%
Democratic	Madeleine Bordallo Ping Duenas	15,668	40.22%
Write-in		2,608	6.70%
Total votes		38,953	100.00%

=== U.S. Virgin Islands ===
Candidate	Running mate	Party	Votes	%
Alexander A. Farrelly	Derek M. Hodge	Democratic Party	13,714	59.77
Juan Francisco Luis	Bingley Richardson	Independent	9,230	40.23
Total			22,944	100.00

== See also ==
- 1990 United States elections
  - 1990 United States Senate elections
  - 1990 United States House of Representatives elections
