= Viewfield, South Dakota =

Unincorporated community in South Dakota, United States

- Unincorporated community
- Location within South Dakota
- Coordinates: 44°12′43″N 102°49′47″W
- Country: United States
- State: South Dakota
- County: Meade
- Elevation: 2,812 ft (857 m)
- Time zone: UTC-7 (Mountain (MST))
  - Summer (DST): UTC-6 (MDT)
- Area code: 605
- GNIS feature ID: 1261075

Viewfield is an unincorporated community in Meade County, South Dakota, United States.

Panoramic views over the surrounding fields can be had from the town site, hence the name.

== Notable person ==
- Walter Dale Miller, 29th Governor of South Dakota, was born in Viewfield.
