= George S. Mickelson =

Governor of South Dakota from 1987 to 1993

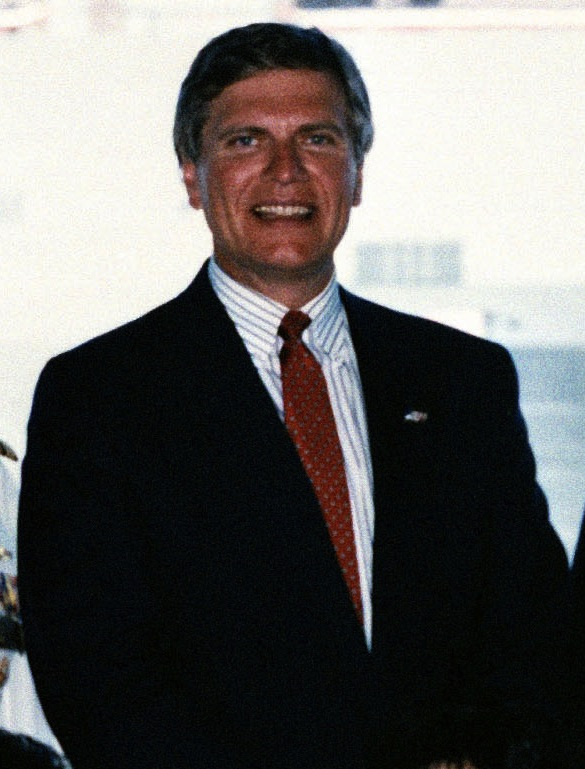
- Mickelson in May 1989

28th Governor of South Dakota
- In office January 6, 1987 – April 19, 1993
- Lieutenant: Walter Dale Miller
- Preceded by: Bill Janklow
- Succeeded by: Walter Dale Miller

Personal details
- Born: George Speaker Mickelson; January 31, 1941 Mobridge, South Dakota, U.S.
- Died: April 19, 1993 (aged 52) Otter Creek Township, Jackson County, Iowa, U.S.
- Cause of death: Plane crash
- Party: Republican
- Spouse: Linda McCahren
- Relatives: George Theodore Mickelson (father); Mark Mickelson (son)
- Education: University of South Dakota (BA, JD)

Military service
- Allegiance: United States
- Branch/service: United States Army
- Rank: Captain
- Battles/wars: Vietnam War

George Speaker Mickelson (January 31, 1941 – April 19, 1993) was an American politician and Vietnam War veteran who served as the 28th governor of South Dakota from 1987 until his death in 1993 in a plane crash near Zwingle, Iowa.

His father, George T. Mickelson, was also governor of South Dakota, from 1947 to 1951. To date, the Mickelsons are the only father-son duo to have held that office. He is a member of the prominent Mickelson family of South Dakota.

== Early life and education ==
Mickelson was born in Mobridge, South Dakota. His grandfather was a Norwegian immigrant. His parents, George Theodore Mickelson and Madge Mickelson, were the Governor and First Lady of South Dakota from 1947 to 1951.

Mickelson graduated from the University of South Dakota with a bachelor's in business administration in 1963 and from the University of South Dakota School of Law in 1965. He was a brother in Lambda Chi Alpha fraternity at USD. He served in the United States Army, including a tour of duty in Vietnam. He married Linda McCahren and they had three children, Amy, David and Mark.

== Public service and plane crash ==
Mickelson served as South Dakota State Assistant Attorney General (1967–68) and South Dakota State Attorney, Brookings County (1971–74). First elected to the South Dakota House of Representatives in 1974, he held office there for six years, serving as Speaker for the final two years. Mickelson was elected governor in 1986 and reelected four years later.

On April 19, 1993, Mickelson was one of eight people aboard a state-owned airplane returning to South Dakota from a lobbying effort in Ohio. The plane, a Mitsubishi MU-2 turboprop, reported engine trouble while flying near Dubuque, Iowa, and crashed into a farm silo about four miles south of Zwingle. Everyone on the plane was killed.

Mickelson was succeeded as governor by then-Lieutenant Governor Walter Dale Miller.

== Legacy ==
George S. Mickelson Middle School in Brookings is named after him, as is the George S. Mickelson Trail in the Black Hills and the George S. Mickelson Center for the Neurosciences in Yankton, South Dakota. The George S. Mickelson Education Center at Southeast Technical Institute in Sioux Falls, South Dakota, was built in 1990. The George S. Mickelson Great Service Award is given out annually by the South Dakota Office of Tourism. His alma mater, the University of South Dakota, awards South Dakota students with high ACTs/SATs a full-tuition scholarship, known as the George S. Mickelson Scholarship. It is the university's most prestigious scholarship.

== See also ==
- George S. Mickelson Trail

Political offices
Preceded by Lowell C. Hansen II	Speaker of the South Dakota House of Representatives; 1979–1980	Succeeded by Walt Miller
Preceded by Bill Janklow	Governor of South Dakota; 1987–1993	Succeeded by Walt Miller
Party political offices
Preceded by Bill Janklow	Republican nominee for Governor of South Dakota; 1986, 1990	Succeeded by Bill Janklow
