= 1986 South Dakota gubernatorial election =

- November 4, 1986
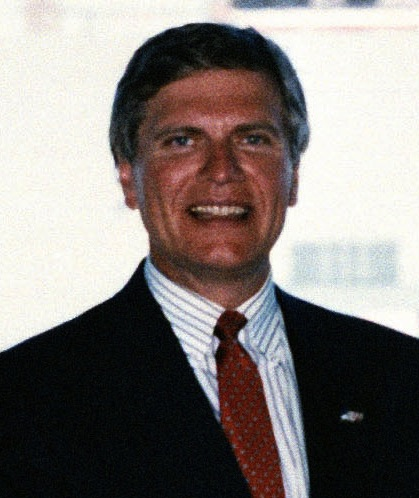

Nominee	George Mickelson	Lars Herseth
Party	Republican	Democratic
Running mate	Walter D. Miller	Ted Thoms
Popular vote	152,543	141,898
Percentage	51.81%	48.19%
- County results Mickelson: 50–60% 60–70% Herseth: 50–60% 60–70% 70–80%
Governor before election
Bill Janklow
Republican
Elected Governor
George Mickelson
Republican

The 1986 South Dakota gubernatorial election was held on November 4, 1986 to elect the Governor of South Dakota. Incumbent Bill Janklow was term-limited, so the field for the new governor was open. Republican nominee George S. Mickelson was elected, defeating Democratic nominee Ralph Lars Herseth. Until 2018, this would be the closest Gubernatorial election in South Dakota.

== Republican primary ==
=== Candidates ===
- George S. Mickelson, Speaker of the South Dakota House of Representatives
- Clint Roberts, former member of the United States House of Representatives from South Dakota's 2nd district
- Lowell Hansen, incumbent Lieutenant Governor of South Dakota
- Alice Kundert, South Dakota Secretary of State

=== Results ===
Republican primary results
Party	Candidate	Votes	%
Republican	George S. Mickelson	40,979	35.30
Republican	Clint Roberts	37,250	32.08
Republican	Lowell Hansen	21,884	18.85
Republican	Alice Kundert	15,985	13.77
Total votes		116,098	100.00

== Democratic primary ==
=== Candidates ===
- Ralph Lars Herseth, State Representative
- Richard F. Kneip, former Governor of South Dakota
- Kenneth D. Stofferahn, South Dakota Public Utilities Commissioner

=== Results ===
Democratic primary results
Party	Candidate	Votes	%
Democratic	Ralph Lars Herseth	30,801	42.81
Democratic	Richard F. Kneip	27,811	38.66
Democratic	Kenneth D. Stofferahn	13,332	18.53
Total votes		71,944	100.00

== General election ==
=== Results ===
South Dakota gubernatorial election, 1986
Party	Candidate	Votes	%
Republican	George S. Mickelson	152,543	51.81
Democratic	Ralph Lars Herseth	141,898	48.19
Total votes		294,441	100.00
Republican hold			
