= 1990 South Dakota gubernatorial election =

- November 6, 1990
- Turnout: 61.07% (voting eligible)
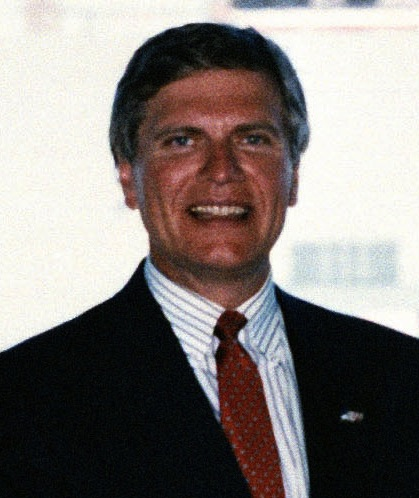

Nominee	George Mickelson	Bob Samuelson
Party	Republican	Democratic
Running mate	Walter Dale Miller	Shirley Halleen
Popular vote	151,198	105,525
Percentage	58.90%	41.10%
- County results Mickelson: 50–60% 60–70% Samuelson: 50–60% 60–70%
Governor before election
George Mickelson
Republican
Elected Governor
George Mickelson
Republican

The 1990 South Dakota gubernatorial election took place on November 6, 1990, to elect a governor of South Dakota. Republican governor George S. Mickelson was re-elected, defeating Democratic nominee Bob L. Samuelson. Mickelson died in a plane crash near Zwingle, Iowa on April 19, 1993.

== Republican primary ==
=== Candidates ===
- George S. Mickelson, incumbent governor of South Dakota

== Democratic primary ==
=== Candidates ===
- Bob L. Samuelson, former state senator

== General election ==
=== Results ===
South Dakota gubernatorial election, 1990
Party	Candidate	Votes	%
Republican	George S. Mickelson (inc.)	151,198	58.90
Democratic	Bob L. Samuelson	105,525	41.10
Total votes		256,723	100.00
Republican hold			
