= Walter Dale Miller =

American politician

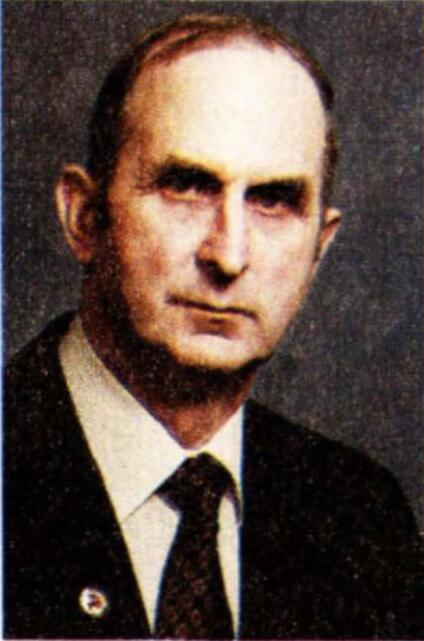
- Miller in 1985

29th Governor of South Dakota
- In office April 19, 1993 – January 7, 1995
- Lieutenant: Steve T. Kirby
- Preceded by: George S. Mickelson
- Succeeded by: Bill Janklow

34th Lieutenant Governor of South Dakota
- In office January 6, 1987 – April 19, 1993
- Governor: George S. Mickelson
- Preceded by: Lowell C. Hansen II
- Succeeded by: Steve T. Kirby

Member of the South Dakota House of Representatives
- In office January 1967 – January 6, 1987

Personal details
- Born: October 5, 1925 Viewfield, South Dakota, U.S.
- Died: September 28, 2015 (aged 89) Dallas, Texas, U.S.
- Party: Republican
- Occupation: Rancher; Businessman

Walter Dale "Walt" Miller (October 5, 1925 – September 28, 2015) was an American politician and member of the Republican Party. He served as the 29th governor of South Dakota from 1993 to 1995, having assumed the office upon the death of George S. Mickelson. He was, at age 67 upon taking office, the oldest person to serve as the governor of South Dakota.

== Biography ==
Miller was born in 1925 in the unincorporated community of Viewfield in Meade County, South Dakota near his family ranch, where he lived and worked throughout his life. He attended the South Dakota School of Mines and Technology but did not graduate. In addition to ranching, Miller was the president of the Dakota National Life Insurance Company from 1970 to 1985.

== Career ==
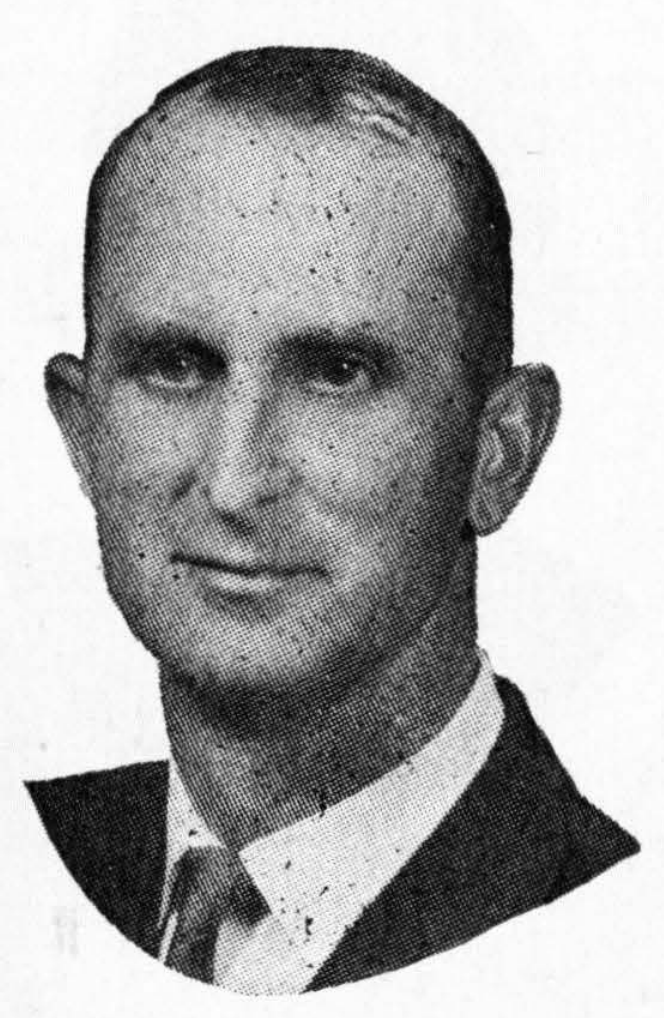
Miller c. 1969

From 1967 to 1986, Miller served in the South Dakota House of Representatives. From 1975 to 1978, and again in 1986, he served as House Majority Leader. Miller was Speaker of the House in 1981 and 1982. During his legislative tenure, he also served as Speaker Pro Tempore, Assistant Majority Leader, and Majority Whip.

In the 1984 presidential election, Miller was the state chair of the Reagan-Bush campaign, and in the 1988 presidential election he was the state co-chair of the Bush-Quayle campaign.

George S. Mickelson announced on June 16, 1986 that he would pick Miller to be his choice for lieutenant governor for that November's election. The ticket was victorious and Miller served as the 34th Lieutenant Governor of South Dakota and its first full-time lieutenant governor from 1987 until Governor Mickelson's death on April 19, 1993, when he assumed the governorship.

Miller lost the 1994 Republican gubernatorial primary to former two-term governor Bill Janklow.

== Personal life ==
After leaving office in 1995, Miller continued to ranch north of New Underwood, on the boundary between Meade and Pennington counties, and resided part-time in Fort Pierre, where he was involved in various lobbying and ranching activities.

In 1943, he married Mary Randall, with whom he had four children: Nancy, Karey, Randy and Renee. Mary died in 1989. In 1993, Miller married Patricia Caldwell, becoming the first governor of South Dakota to marry while in office. He had two stepchildren, Cade and Rebecca. Patricia Caldwell Miller ran unsuccessfully for the Republican nomination for state auditor in 2010. She served as deputy secretary of state, and unsuccessfully sought the Republican nomination for secretary of state in 2014.

Miller died on September 28, 2015, at age 89 one week before his 90th birthday, while visiting Dallas. He was returned to South Dakota, and buried in Viewfield.

Party political offices
Preceded by Lowell C. Hansen II	Republican nominee for Lieutenant Governor of South Dakota; 1986, 1990	Succeeded by Carole Hillard
Political offices
Preceded by George S. Mickelson	Speaker of the South Dakota House of Representatives; 1981–1982	Succeeded by Jerome B. Lammers
Preceded by Lowell C. Hansen II	Lieutenant Governor of South Dakota; 1987–1993	Succeeded by Steve T. Kirby
Preceded by George S. Mickelson	Governor of South Dakota; 1993–1995	Succeeded by Bill Janklow
