= Lowell C. Hansen II =

American politician

Lowell C. Hansen II (born October 11, 1939) is an American politician from South Dakota. He is a member of the Republican Party.

Hansen who is from Sioux Falls, served as a member of the South Dakota House of Representatives from 1973 to 1978, serving as Speaker of the House of that body from 1977 to 1978. He was elected as the 33rd Lieutenant Governor of South Dakota in 1978 and re-elected in 1982 as the running mate of Bill Janklow and served from 1979 until 1987.

Party political offices
Preceded by Charles Clay	Republican nominee for Lieutenant Governor of South Dakota; 1978, 1982	Succeeded by Walter Dale Miller
Political offices
Preceded by Harvey L. Wollman	Lieutenant Governor of South Dakota; 1979–1987	Succeeded by Walter Dale Miller
