= Shirley K. Halleen =

American politician

Member of the South Dakota House of Representatives
- In office 1981–1984

Personal details
- Born: May 17, 1935 (age 91) Russell, Iowa, U.S.
- Party: Democratic
- Spouse: Owen
- Children: 3
- Education: Wheaton College

Shirley K. Halleen (born May 17, 1935) is an American politician. She served as a Democratic member of the South Dakota House of Representatives.

== Life and career ==
Halleen was born in Russell, Iowa. She attended Wheaton College.

Halleen served in the South Dakota House of Representatives from 1981 to 1984.
