= List of elections in 1990 =

The following elections occurred in the year 1990.

== Africa ==
- 1990 Algerian local election
- 1990 Beninese constitutional referendum
- 1990 Chadian parliamentary election
- 1990 Comorian presidential election
- 1990 Egyptian parliamentary election
- 1990 Gabonese legislative election
- 1990 Guinean constitutional referendum
- 1990 Ivorian parliamentary election
- 1990 Ivorian presidential election
- 1990 São Tomé and Príncipe constitutional referendum
- 1990 Tanzanian general election
- 1990 Togolese parliamentary election
- 1990 Zimbabwean parliamentary election
- 1990 Zimbabwean presidential election

== Asia ==
- 1990 Autonomous Region in Muslim Mindanao general election
- 1990 Burmese general election
- 1990 Egyptian parliamentary election
- 1990 Kuwaiti National Council election
- 1990 Malaysian general election
- 1990 Mongolian legislative election
- 1990 Myanmar general election
- 1990 North Korean parliamentary election
- 1990 Pakistani general election
- 1990 Syrian parliamentary election
- 1990 Taiwan presidential election
- 1990 Uzbek presidential election

=== Japan ===
- 1990 Japanese general election

=== Soviet Union ===
- 1990 Azerbaijani parliamentary election
- 1990 Estonian Supreme Soviet election
- 1990 Georgian legislative election
- 1990 Latvian parliamentary election
- 1990 Lithuanian parliamentary election
- 1990 Soviet Union presidential election
- 1990 Ukrainian parliamentary election

==== Moldova ====
- 1990 Moldovan parliamentary election

==== Russia ====
- 1990 Russian legislative election

== Australia ==
- 1990 Australian federal election
- 1990 Coffs Harbour state by-election
- 1990 Cottesloe state by-election
- 1990 Custance state by-election
- 1990 Fremantle state by-election
- 1990 Heffron state by-election
- 1990 Macquarie Fields state by-election
- 1990 Maylands state by-election
- 1990 Northern Territory general election
- 1990 Smithfield state by-election
- 1990 Thomastown state by-election

== Europe ==
- 1990 Austrian legislative election
- 1990 Byelorussian Supreme Soviet election
- 1990 Belgian regional elections
- 1990 Bosnia and Herzegovina municipal elections
- Bulgaria:
  - 1990 Bulgarian Constitutional Assembly election
  - April 1990 Bulgarian presidential election
  - July-August 1990 Bulgarian presidential election
- 1990 Croatian parliamentary election
- Czechoslovakia (since 23 April 1990 Czech and Slovak Federative Republic):
  - 1990 Czech legislative election
  - 1990 Czechoslovak parliamentary election
  - 1990 Czech National Council election
  - 1990 Czechoslovak presidential election
  - 1990 Slovak parliamentary election
- 1990 Danish parliamentary election
- 1990 Faroese parliamentary election
- Germany:
  - 1990 Bavarian state election
  - 1990 Berlin state election
  - 1990 Brandenburg state election
  - 1990 East German general election
  - 1990 German federal election
  - 1990 Lower Saxony state election
  - 1990 Mecklenburg-Vorpommern state election
  - 1990 North Rhine-Westphalia state election
  - 1990 Saarland state election
  - 1990 Saxony state election
  - 1990 Saxony-Anhalt state election
  - 1990 Thuringian state election
- 1990 Greek legislative election
- 1990 Greek presidential election
- 1990 Hungarian parliamentary election (25 March and 8 April 1990)
- 1990 Hungarian presidential election (3 August 1990)
- 1990 Irish presidential election
- Italy:
  - 1990 Italian local elections
  - 1990 Venetian regional election
- 1990 Northern Cyprus parliamentary election
- 1990 Northern Cyprus presidential election
- 1990 Polish presidential election
- 1990 Romanian presidential election
- 1990 Serbian constitutional referendum
- Soviet Union
  - 1990 Azerbaijani parliamentary election
  - 1990 Estonian Supreme Soviet election
  - 1990 Georgian legislative election
  - 1990 Latvian parliamentary election
  - 1990 Lithuanian parliamentary election
  - 1990 Moldovan parliamentary election
  - 1990 Russian Supreme Soviet election
  - 1990 Soviet Union presidential election
  - 1990 Ukrainian parliamentary election
- Spain: 1990 Basque parliamentary election
- 1990 Swiss referendums
- United Kingdom
  - May 1990 Bootle by-election
  - November 1990 Bootle by-election
  - 1990 Bradford North by-election
  - 1990 Conservative Party leadership election
  - 1990 Eastbourne by-election
  - 1990 Knowsley South by-election
  - 1990 Paisley North by-election
  - 1990 Paisley South by-election
  - 1990 Mid Staffordshire by-election
  - 1990 Upper Bann by-election
  - United Kingdom local
    - 1990 Scottish regional elections
    - 1990 United Kingdom local elections
  - English local
    - 1990 Bristol City Council election
    - 1990 Lambeth Council election
    - 1990 Lewisham Council election
    - 1990 Manchester Council election
    - 1990 Newham Council election
    - 1990 Southwark Council election
    - 1990 Tower Hamlets Council election
    - 1990 Trafford Council election
    - 1990 Wolverhampton Council election
- Yugoslavia:
  - 1990 Bosnian general election
  - 1990 Croatian parliamentary election
  - 1990 Macedonian parliamentary election
  - 1990 Montenegrin municipal election
  - 1990 Montenegrin parliamentary election
  - 1990 Serbian parliamentary election
  - 1990 Slovenian parliamentary election
  - 1990 Slovenian presidential election

== North America ==
- 1989–1991 Belizean municipal elections
- 1990 Costa Rican general election
- 1990 Guatemalan general election
- 1990 Nicaraguan general election

=== Canada ===
- 1990 Liberal Party of Canada leadership election
- 1990 Manitoba general election
- 1990 Ontario general election

=== Caribbean ===
- 1990 Dominican general election
- 1990 Dominican Republic general election
- 1990 Grenadian general election
- 1990–1991 Haitian general election

=== United States ===
- 1990 United States elections

==== United States lieutenant gubernatorial ====
- 1990 Alabama lieutenant gubernatorial election
- 1990 California lieutenant gubernatorial election
- 1990 Georgia lieutenant gubernatorial election
- 1990 Oklahoma lieutenant gubernatorial election
- 1990 Texas lieutenant gubernatorial election

==== United States mayoral ====
- 1990 Anchorage mayoral election
- 1990 Auburn, Alabama municipal election
- 1990 Irvine mayoral election
- 1990 New Orleans mayoral election
- 1990 San Jose mayoral election
- 1990 Shreveport mayoral election
- 1990 Washington, D.C., mayoral election

==== United States gubernatorial ====
- 1990 Alabama gubernatorial election
- 1990 Alaska gubernatorial election
- 1990 Arizona gubernatorial election
- 1990 Arkansas gubernatorial election
- 1990 California gubernatorial election
- 1990 Colorado gubernatorial election
- 1990 Connecticut gubernatorial election
- 1990 Florida gubernatorial election
- 1990 Georgia gubernatorial election
- 1990 Hawaii gubernatorial election
- 1990 Idaho gubernatorial election
- 1990 Iowa gubernatorial election
- 1990 Kansas gubernatorial election
- 1990 Maine gubernatorial election
- 1990 Maryland gubernatorial election
- 1990 Massachusetts gubernatorial election
- 1990 Michigan gubernatorial election
- 1990 Minnesota gubernatorial election
- 1990 Nebraska gubernatorial election
- 1990 Nevada gubernatorial election
- 1990 New Hampshire gubernatorial election
- 1990 New Mexico gubernatorial election
- 1990 New York gubernatorial election
- 1990 Ohio gubernatorial election
- 1990 Oklahoma gubernatorial election
- 1990 Oregon gubernatorial election
- 1990 Pennsylvania gubernatorial election
- 1990 Rhode Island gubernatorial election
- 1990 South Carolina gubernatorial election
- 1990 South Dakota gubernatorial election
- 1990 Tennessee gubernatorial election
- 1990 Texas gubernatorial election
- 1990 United States gubernatorial elections
- 1990 Vermont gubernatorial election
- 1990 Wisconsin gubernatorial election
- 1990 Wyoming gubernatorial election

==== Alabama ====
- 1990 Alabama gubernatorial election

==== Alaska ====
- 1990 Alaska gubernatorial election

==== Arkansas ====
- United States Senate election in Arkansas, 1990

==== California ====
- 1990 California State Senate election
- 1990 California gubernatorial election
- United States House of Representatives elections in California, 1990

==== Connecticut ====
- 1990 Connecticut gubernatorial election

==== Georgia (U.S. state) ====
- 1990 Georgia gubernatorial election
- United States Senate election in Georgia, 1990

==== Hawaii ====
- United States Senate special election in Hawaii, 1990

==== Idaho ====
- 1990 Idaho gubernatorial election

==== Illinois ====
- United States Senate election in Illinois, 1990

==== Indiana ====
- United States Senate special election in Indiana, 1990

==== Iowa ====
- United States Senate election in Iowa, 1990

==== Kansas ====
- 1990 Kansas gubernatorial election
- United States Senate election in Kansas, 1990

==== Kentucky ====
- United States Senate election in Kentucky, 1990

==== Louisiana ====
- 1990 New Orleans mayoral election

==== Maine ====
- 1990 Maine gubernatorial election

==== Massachusetts ====
- 1990 Massachusetts general election
- 1990 Massachusetts gubernatorial election
- United States Senate election in Massachusetts, 1990

==== Michigan ====
- 1990 Michigan gubernatorial election

==== Minnesota ====
- 1990 Minnesota gubernatorial election

==== Mississippi ====
- United States Senate election in Mississippi, 1990

==== Nebraska ====
- United States Senate election in Nebraska, 1990

==== New Hampshire ====
- United States Senate election in New Hampshire, 1990

==== New Jersey ====
- United States Senate election in New Jersey, 1990

==== New York ====
- 1990 New York gubernatorial election

==== North Carolina ====
- United States Senate election in North Carolina, 1990

==== Oklahoma ====
- 1990 Oklahoma gubernatorial election

==== Oregon ====
- Oregon Ballot Measure 5 (1990)
- 1990 Oregon gubernatorial election

==== Rhode Island ====
- United States Senate election in Rhode Island, 1990

==== South Carolina ====
- 1990 South Carolina gubernatorial election
- United States House of Representatives elections in South Carolina, 1990

==== United States House of Representatives ====
- 1990 United States House of Representatives elections
- United States House of Representatives elections in California, 1990
- United States House of Representatives elections in South Carolina, 1990

==== United States Senate ====
- 1990 United States Senate elections
- United States Senate election in Arkansas, 1990
- United States Senate election in Georgia, 1990
- United States Senate special election in Hawaii, 1990
- United States Senate election in Illinois, 1990
- United States Senate special election in Indiana, 1990
- United States Senate election in Iowa, 1990
- United States Senate election in Kansas, 1990
- United States Senate election in Kentucky, 1990
- United States Senate election in Massachusetts, 1990
- United States Senate election in Mississippi, 1990
- United States Senate election in Nebraska, 1990
- United States Senate election in New Hampshire, 1990
- United States Senate election in New Jersey, 1990
- United States Senate election in North Carolina, 1990
- United States Senate election in Rhode Island, 1990
- United States Senate election in South Carolina, 1990
- United States Senate election in Virginia, 1990

==== Virginia ====
- United States Senate election in South Carolina, 1990
- United States Senate election in Virginia, 1990

==== Washington, D.C. ====
- 1990 Washington, D.C. mayoral election

==== West Virginia ====
- United States Senate election in West Virginia, 1990

== South America ==
- 1990 Brazilian legislative election
- Colombia:
  - 1990 Colombian Constitutional Assembly election
  - 1990 Colombian parliamentary election
  - 1990 Colombian presidential election
- 1990 Ecuadorian parliamentary election
- 1990 Peruvian general election

== Oceania ==
- 1990 Marshallese referendum
- 1990 New Zealand general election
- 1990 Niuean general election
- 1990 Tongan general election
- 1990 Western Samoan constitutional referendum

=== Australia ===
- 1990 Australian federal election
- 1990 Coffs Harbour state by-election
- 1990 Cottesloe state by-election
- 1990 Custance state by-election
- 1990 Fremantle state by-election
- 1990 Heffron state by-election
- 1990 Macquarie Fields state by-election
- 1990 Maylands state by-election
- 1990 Northern Territory general election
- 1990 Smithfield state by-election
- 1990 Thomastown state by-election

=== Hawaii ===
- United States Senate special election in Hawaii, 1990
