= Endorsements in the 1988 Democratic Party presidential primaries =

This is a list of endorsements for declared candidates in the Democratic primaries for the 1988 United States presidential election.

== Convention candidates ==
=== Jesse Jackson ===
List of Jesse Jackson endorsements

U.S. Senate

- Ernest Hollings, United States Senator from South Carolina

U.S. House of Representatives

- Bill Clay, member of the U.S. House of Representatives from Missouri's 1st congressional district (1969–2001)
- Cardiss Collins, member of the U.S. House of Representatives from Illinois's 7th congressional district (1973–1997)
- John Conyers, member of the U.S. House of Representatives from Michigan (1965–2017)
- Ron Dellums, member of the U.S. House of Representatives from California (1971–1998)
- Mervyn Dymally, CA-31 (1981–1993)
- Augustus Hawkins, member of the U.S. House of Representatives from California (1963–1991)
- Floyd Flake, member of the U.S. House of Representatives from New York's 6th congressional district (1987–1997)
- Harold Ford Sr., member of the U.S. House of Representatives from Tennessee (1975–1997)
- Charles Hayes, member of the U.S. House of Representatives from Illinois's 1st congressional district (1983–1993)
- Mickey Leland, member of the U.S. House of Representatives from Texas's 18th congressional district (1979–1989)
- Kweisi Mfume, member of the U.S. House of Representatives from Maryland's 7th congressional district (1987–1996)
- Major Owens, member of the U.S. House of Representatives from New York (1983–2017)
- Charles Rangel, member of the U.S. House of Representatives from New York (1971–2017)
- Gus Savage, member of the U.S. House of Representatives from Illinois's 2nd congressional district (1981–1993)
- Louis Stokes, member of the United States House of Representatives from Ohio (1969–1999)
- Edolphus Towns, member of the U.S. House of Representatives from New York (1983–2013)

Statewide officials

- Orval Faubus, former governor of Arkansas
- Jim Hightower, 8th Agriculture Commissioner of Texas (1983–1991)

Newspapers

- The Capital Times
- Daily Utah Chronicle
- The Nation
- Philadelphia Daily News

State legislators

California State Assembly

- Maxine Waters, CA-48 (1976–1990)

Iowa Senate

- Thomas Mann, IA-43 (1983-1989)

Michigan House of Representatives

- Floyd Clack, MI-80 (1983–1993), MI-48 (1993–1997)
- Teola Pearl Hunter, MI-05 (1981–1993)
- Carolyn Cheeks Kilpatrick, MI-18 (1979–1983), MI-08 (1983–1993), MI-09 (1993–1997)
- Raymond M. Murphy, MI-07 (1983–1989)
- Nelson Saunders, MI-07 (1983–1993), MI-10 (1993–1997)
- Alma G. Stallworth, MI-15 (1971–1973), MI-04 (1973–1974; 1983–1996), MI-12 (1993–1996), MI-08 (2003–2004)
- Ethel Terrell, MI-09 (1979–1991)
- Ilona Varga, MI-03 (1987–1993), MI-08 (1993–1999)
- Joe Young Sr., MI-15 (1975–1983), MI-15 (1983–1993), MI-03 (1993–1995)

Michigan Senate

- David S. Holmes Jr., MI-04 (1974–1994)

South Carolina House of Representatives

- Kenneth E. Bailey Sr., SC-94 (1985–1991)
- Joe Ellis Brown, SC-73 (1986–2005)
- James Faber, SC-70 (1985–1990)
- Benjamin J. Gordon Jr, SC-101 (1973–1989)
- Frank Gilbert, SC-62 (1983–1989)
- Frank McBride, SC-74 (1985–1991)
- Daniel E. Martin Sr., SC-111 (1984–1991)
- Sara Beatty Shelton, SC-23 (1985–1988)
- Luther L Taylor Jr, SC-77 (1983–1990)
- McKinley Washington Jr., SC-116 (1975–1990)
- Lucille Whipper, SC-109 (1986–1996)
- DeWitt Williams, SC-102 (1983–1996)

South Carolina Senate

- John W. Matthews Jr., SC-39 (1985–2021)
- Theo Mitchell, SC-07 (1985–1995)
- Kay Patterson, SC-19 (1985–2008)

Local officials

- Richard Arrington Jr., Mayor of Birmingham, Alabama (1979-1999)
- Marion Barry, Mayor of the District of Columbia (1979–1991; 1995–1999)
- Sidney Barthelemy, 58th Mayor of New Orleans (1986–1994)
- William A. Collins, 34th and 36th Mayor of Norwalk, Connecticut (1977–1981; 1983–1987)
- David Dinkins, Borough president of Manhattan (1986–1989)
- Clay Dixon, 52nd Mayor of Dayton, Ohio (1987–1994)
- Harvey Gantt, 50th Mayor of Charlotte, North Carolina
- Wilson Goode, 95th Mayor of Philadelphia (1984–1992)
- Richard G. Hatcher, 16th Mayor of Gary, Indiana
- James H. McGee, Mayor of Dayton, Ohio (1970–1982)
- Bernie Sanders, Mayor of Burlington, Vermont (1981-1989)
- Harold Washington, 51st Mayor of Chicago (1983–1987)

Labor unions

- National Union of Hospital and Health Care Employees

Organizations

- Tulsa Association of Community Organizations for Reform Now

Notable individuals

Actors and filmmakers

- Byron Allen, film producer
- Debbie Allen, actress
- Susan Anspach, actress
- Robert Blake, actor
- Ned Beatty, actor
- Eileen Brennan, actress
- Gary Busey, actor
- Bill Cosby, actor
- Ossie Davis, actor and director
- Robert Foxworth, actor
- Anthony Franciosa, actor
- Marla Gibbs, actress
- Louis Gossett Jr., actor
- Valerie Harper, actress
- John Heard, actor
- Gregory Hines, actor
- Margot Kidder, actress
- Kris Kristofferson, actor and singer
- Diane Ladd, actress
- Spike Lee, director
- Cleavon Little, actor
- Elizabeth Montgomery, actress
- Eddie Murphy, actor
- Oz Scott, director
- Martin Sheen, actor
- Meryl Streep, actress
- Cicely Tyson, actress
- Dennis Weaver, actor

Athletes

- Magic Johnson, basketball player
- Isiah Thomas, basketball player
- Mike Tyson, boxer

Music

- Carl Anderson, singer
- Harry Belafonte, singer
- Jackson Browne, singer
- Irene Cara, singer
- Natalie Cole, singer
- Rita Coolidge, singer
- David Crosby, singer
- Sammy Davis Jr., singer
- Roberta Flack, singer
- Aretha Franklin, singer
- Dick Griffey, producer
- Herbie Hancock, pianist
- Phyllis Hyman, singer
- Al Jarreau, singer
- Quincy Jones, producer
- Casey Kasem, disc jokey
- Gladys Knight, singer
- Melba Moore, singer
- Willie Nelson, singer
- Bonnie Raitt, singer and guitarist
- Lou Rawls, singer
- Helen Reddy, singer
- Buffy Sainte-Marie, singer
- Pete Seeger, singer
- Bob Seger, singer
- Mary Wilson, singer
- Stevie Wonder, singer

Other

- Amy Carter, daughter of Jimmy Carter
- Louis Farrakhan, leader of the Nation of Islam (1981–present)
- M. T. Mehdi, activist

== Withdrawn candidates ==
=== Bruce Babbitt ===
List of Bruce Babbitt endorsements

U.S. House of Representatives

- Mo Udall, member of the U.S. House of Representatives from Arizona's 2nd congressional district (1961–1991)

Statewide officials

- Kathy Karpan, 17th Secretary of State of Wyoming (1987–1995)
- Tom Miller, 31st and 33rd Attorney General of Iowa (1979–1991; 1995–2023)

Party officials

- Jean Westwood, chair of the Democratic National Committee (1972)

=== Joe Biden ===
List of Joe Biden endorsements

U.S. Senate

- Daniel Inouye, U.S. Senator from Hawaii (1963–2012)

U.S. House of Representatives

- Barbara Boxer, CA-06 (1983–1993)
- Norman D'Amours, NH-01 (1975–1985)
- Peter W. Rodino, NJ-10 (1949–1989)

Statewide officials

- William Allain, 59th Governor of Mississippi (1984–1988)
- Jo Ann Zimmerman, 42nd Lieutenant Governor of Iowa (1987–1991)

Municipal officials

- Eileen Foley, mayor of Portsmouth, New Hampshire (1968–1971; 1984–1985; 1988–1997)

=== Dick Gephardt ===
List of Dick Gephardt endorsements

U.S. Congress

- Michael A. Andrews, member of the U.S. House of Representatives from Texas's 25th congressional district (1983–1995)
- Beryl Anthony Jr., member of the U.S. House of Representatives from Arkansas's 4th congressional district (1979–1993)
- Anthony Beilenson, member of the U.S. House of Representatives from California (1977–1997)
- Richard W. Bolling, MO-05 (1949–1983)
- Rick Boucher, member of the U.S. House of Representatives from Virginia's 9th congressional district (1983–2011)
- John Bryant, member of the U.S. House of Representatives from Texas's 5th congressional district (1983–1997)
- Albert Bustamante, member of the U.S. House of Representatives from Texas's 23rd congressional district (1985–1993)
- Jim Chapman, member of the U.S. House of Representatives from Texas's 1st congressional district (1985–1997)
- Tony Coelho, member of the U.S. House of Representatives from California's 15th congressional district (1979–1989)
- Butler Derrick, member of the U.S. House of Representatives from South Carolina's 3rd congressional district (1975–1995)
- John Dingell, member of the U.S. House of Representatives from Michigan (1955–2015)
- Byron Dorgan, member of the U.S. House of Representatives from North Dakota's at-large congressional district (1981–1992)
- Glenn English, member of the U.S. House of Representatives from Oklahoma's 6th congressional district (1975–1994)
- Ben Erdreich, member of the U.S. House of Representatives from Alabama's 6th congressional district (1983–1993)
- Dante Fascell, member of the U.S. House of Representatives from Florida (1955–1993)
- Vic Fazio, member of the U.S. House of Representatives from California's 15th congressional district (1979–1999)
- Ed Feighan, member of the United States House of Representatives from Ohio's 19th congressional district (1983–1993)
- Ronnie Flippo, member of the U.S. House of Representatives from Alabama's 5th congressional district (1977–1991)
- Dan Glickman, member of the U.S. House of Representatives from Kansas's 4th congressional district (1977–1995)
- Bill Grant, member of the U.S. House of Representatives from Florida's 2nd congressional district (1987–1991)
- Jimmy Hayes, member of the U.S. House of Representatives from Louisiana's 7th congressional district (1987–1997)
- Carroll Hubbard, member of the U.S. House of Representatives from Kentucky's 1st congressional district (1975–1993)
- Jerry Huckaby, member of the U.S. House of Representatives from Louisiana's 5th congressional district (1977–1993)
- Tom Foley, WA-05 (1965–1995) and Majority Leader (1987–1989)
- Martin Frost, TX-24 (1979–2005)
- Ed Jenkins, GA-09 (1977–1993)
- Marvin Leath, member of the U.S. House of Representatives from Texas's 11th congressional district (1979–1991)
- Sander Levin, member of the U.S. House of Representatives from Michigan (1983–2019)
- Bill Lipinski, member of the U.S. House of Representatives from Illinois (1983–2005)
- Buddy MacKay, member of the U.S. House of Representatives from Florida's 6th congressional district (1983–1989)
- Thomas Manton, member of the U.S. House of Representatives from New York (1985–1999)
- Dave McCurdy, member of the U.S. House of Representatives from Oklahoma's 4th congressional district (1981–1995)
- Dan Mica, member of the U.S. House of Representatives from Florida (1979–1989)
- Jim Moody, member of the U.S. House of Representatives from Wisconsin's 5th congressional district (1983–1993)
- John Murtha, member of the U.S. House of Representatives from Pennsylvania's 12th congressional district (1974–2010)
- Bill Nelson, member of the U.S. House of Representatives from Florida (1979–1991)
- Jim Oberstar, member of the U.S. House of Representatives from Minnesota's 8th congressional district (1975–2011)
- Solomon Ortiz, member of the U.S. House of Representatives from Texas's 27th congressional district (1983–2011)
- Leon Panetta, member of the U.S. House of Representatives from California's 15th congressional district (1977–1993)
- Claude Pepper, FL-03 (1963–1967), FL-11 (1967–1973), FL-14 (1973–1983), FL-18 (1983–1989)
- J. J. Pickle, member of the U.S. House of Representatives from Texas's 10th congressional district (1963–1995)
- Dan Rostenkowski, IL-08 (1959–1993), IL-05 (1993–1995)
- Ike Skelton, member of the U.S. House of Representatives from Missouri's 4th congressional district (1977–2011)
- Jim Slattery, member of the U.S. House of Representatives from Kansas's 2nd congressional district (1983–1995)
- Lawrence J. Smith, member of the U.S. House of Representatives from Florida's 16th congressional district (1983–1993)
- John Spratt, member of the U.S. House of Representatives from South Carolina's 5th congressional district (1983–2011)
- Mike Synar, member of the U.S. House of Representatives from Oklahoma's 2nd congressional district (1979–1995)
- Robin Tallon, member of the U.S. House of Representatives from South Carolina's 6th congressional district (1983–1993)
- Lindsay Thomas, member of the U.S. House of Representatives from Georgia's 1st congressional district (1983–1993)
- Robert Torricelli, member of the U.S. House of Representatives from New Jersey's 9th congressional district (1983–1997)
- Harold Volkmer, member of the U.S. House of Representatives from Missouri's 9th congressional district (1977–1997)
- Doug Walgren, member of the U.S. House of Representatives from Pennsylvania's 18th congressional district (1977–1991)
- Alan Wheat, member of the U.S. House of Representatives from Missouri's 5th congressional district (1983–1995)
- Charlie Wilson, member of the U.S. House of Representatives from Texas's 2nd congressional district (1973–1996)
- Bob Wise, member of the U.S. House of Representatives from West Virginia (1983–2001)
- Ron Wyden, member of the U.S. House of Representatives from Oregon's 3rd congressional district (1981–1996)

Governors

- Robert Evander McNair, 108th Governor of South Carolina (1965–1971)
- Richard Riley, 111th Governor of South Carolina (1979–1987)

State legislators

Iowa House of Representatives

- Donald Avenson, IA-15 (1973–1983), IA-28 (1983–1991) and Speaker (1983–1990)

Iowa Senate

- Bill Hutchins, IA-28 (1977–1983), IA-48 (1983–1992) and Senate Majority Leader

Party officials

- Ed Campbell, chair of the Iowa Democratic Party

Notable individuals

- Erma Bombeck, humorist
- Charles M. Schulz, cartoonist

=== Al Gore ===
List of Al Gore endorsements

U.S. Senate

- Howell Heflin, member of the U.S. Senate from Alabama (1979–1997)
- Eugene McCarthy, U.S. Senator from Minnesota (1959–1971)
- Sam Nunn, U.S. Senator from Georgia (1972–1997)
- Harry Reid, member of the U.S. Senate from Nevada (1987–2017)
- Terry Sanford, member of the U.S. Senate from North Carolina (1986–1993)
- Jim Sasser, U.S. Senator from Tennessee (1977–1995)

U.S. House of Representatives

- James M. Clarke, member of the U.S. House of Representatives from North Carolina's 11th congressional district (1987–1991)
- Bob Clement, member of the U.S. House of Representatives from Tennessee's 5th congressional district (1988-2003)
- Jim Cooper, TN-04 (1983–1995), TN-05 (2003–2023)
- Norm Dicks, WA-06 (1977–2013)
- Thomas Downey, NY-02 (1975–1993)
- Bart Gordon, TN-06 (1985–2011)
- Ed Jones, member of the U.S. House of Representatives from Tennessee (1969-1989)
- Tom Lantos, member of the U.S. House of Representatives from California (1981–2008)
- Marilyn Lloyd, member of the U.S. House of Representatives from Tennessee's 3rd congressional district (1975-1995)
- Tom McMillen, member of the U.S. House of Representatives from Maryland's 4th congressional district (1987-1993)

Statewide officials

- Marshall Bennett, Mississippi State Treasurer (1988–2003)
- Max Cleland, 23rd Georgia Secretary of State (1983–1996)
- William J. Cole, former Mississippi State Treasurer (1980–1988)
- Butch Burnette, Kentucky Commissioner of Agriculture (1988–1992)
- James P. Coleman, former Governor of Mississippi (1956–1960)
- George Dale, Insurance Commissioner of Mississippi (1976–2008)
- Brad Dye, Lieutenant Governor of Mississippi (1980–1992)
- Jim Folsom Jr., Lieutenant Governor of Alabama (1987-1993)
- William P. Hobby Jr., 37th Lieutenant Governor of Texas (1973–1991)
- Pete Johnson, State Auditor of Mississippi (1988–1992)
- Wallace Wilkinson, 57th Governor of Kentucky (1987–1991)

State legislators

Alabama House of Representatives

- James S. Clark, Speaker of the Alabama House of Representatives (1987-1999)

Iowa House of Representatives

- Thomas E. Swartz, IA-39 (1981-1983), IA-72 (1983-1989)

South Carolina House of Representatives

- Linwood Altman
- James Arthur
- George Hampton Bailey, SC-97 (1984–2000; 2003–2005)
- Liston Barfield, (1985–1989; 1997–2014)
- David Beasley, SC-56 (1981–1993)
- Edward Bennett, SC-96 (1969–1980; 1983–1987)
- William D. Boan, SC-44 (1983–1997)
- Rex L. Carter, Greenville County (1952–1974), SC-24 (1974–1980) and 55th Speaker (1973–1980)
- C.D. Chamblee, SC-08 (1977–1982; 1985–1987)
- M.J. Cooper, SC-10
- Clyde Dangerfield, SC-112
- Fred Day, SC-92
- Larry E. Gentry, SC-39 (1979–1991)
- Jackson V. Gregory, SC-121 (1980–1990)
- Patrick Harris, SC-09 (1969–1994)
- Alex Harvin, SC-64 (1977–2005)
- James William Johnson Jr., SC-15 (1985–1991)
- Robert Kay, SC-11
- E. Crosby Lewis, SC-41 (1961–1964; 1983–1987)
- Larry A. Martin, (1979–1992)
- Jim Mattos, SC-26 (1985–1994)
- D. Malloy McEachin, SC-63 (1979–1989)
- Alfred McGinnis, SC-36 (1987–1991)
- LeRoy Nettles, SC-61 (1983–1991)
- Lewis Phillips, SC-18 (1977–1987)
- Chick Rice, SC-25 (1985–1987)
- Robert Sheheen, SC-52 (1976–2000) and 57th Speaker (1986–1994)
- Paul Short, SC-43 (1983–1990)
- John James Snow Jr., SC-103 (1977–1994; 2001–2003)
- Jean H. Toal, (1976–1988)
- John Tucker, SC-06 (1985–1993)
- Dave Waldrop, SC-40 (1981–1995)
- Joseph B. Wilder, SC-15 (1987–1993)
- DeWitt Williams, SC-102 (1983–1996)

South Carolina Senate

- T. Ed Garrison Jr., (1967–1988)
- Caldwell Hinson, SC-16 (1985–1991)
- Alexander Macaulay, SC-01 (1981–1993)

Texas House of Representatives

- Gib Lewis, Tarrant County (1971–1993) and Speaker of the Texas House of Representatives (1983–1993)

Wisconsin State Assembly

- Dale Bolle, member of the Wisconsin State Assembly from the 2nd district (1983–1990)
- Scott C. Fergus, member of the Wisconsin State Assembly from the 61st district (1985–1990)
- Richard Grobschmidt, member of the Wisconsin State Assembly from the 21st district (1985–1996)
- Vernon W. Holschbach, member of the Wisconsin State Assembly (1981–1993)
- Mark D. Lewis, member of the Wisconsin State Assembly (1983–1989)
- John Medinger, member of the Wisconsin State Assembly (1977–1993)
- John H. Robinson, member of the Wisconsin State Assembly (1981–1988)

Wisconsin State Senate

- Lloyd H. Kincaid, WI-12 (1983–1990)
- John Plewa, WI-07 (1984–1995)
- Marvin J. Roshell, WI-23 (1979–1992)
- Joseph A. Strohl, Majority Leader of the Wisconsin Senate
- Barbara Ulichny, WI-04 (1984–1995)
- William Te Winkle

Municipal and local officials

- Jim Bailes, member of the Richland County, South Carolina council
- Bob Coble, member of the Richland County, South Carolina council
- Dick Harpootlian, member of the Richland County, South Carolina council
- Ed Koch, Mayor of New York City (1978–1989)

Newspapers

- Chicago Tribune

Notable individuals

- Johnny Cash, singer
- Morgan Fairchild, actress
- Armand Hammer, businessman
- Tommy Lee Jones, actor
- Ernie Passailaigue, owner of Charleston Rainbows
- Pauline Phillips, advice columnist

=== Pat Schroeder ===
List of Pat Schroeder endorsements

U.S. Congress

- Tim Wirth, U.S. Senator from Colorado (1987–1993)

Notable individuals

- Eleanor Smeal, president of Feminist Majority Foundation

=== Paul Simon ===
List of Paul Simon endorsements

U.S. Senate

- Alan J. Dixon, member of the U.S. Senate from Illinois (1981–1993)
- Harold Hughes, U.S. Senator from Iowa (1969–1975)

U.S. House of Representatives

- Berkley Bedell, IA-06 (1975–1987)
- Barbara Boxer, member of the U.S. House of Representatives from California's 6th congressional district (1983–1993)
- Dick Durbin, member of the U.S. House of Representatives from Illinois's 20th congressional district (1983–1997)
- Lane Evans, member of the U.S. House of Representatives from Illinois's 17th congressional district (1983–2007)
- Kenneth J. Gray, member of the U.S. House of Representatives from Illinois (1985–1989)
- Kenneth Lamar Holland, SC-05 (1975–1983)
- Jim Jontz, member of the U.S. House of Representatives from Indiana's 5th congressional district (1987–1993)
- Marcy Kaptur, OH-09 (1983–present)
- Richard H. Lehman, CA-18 (1983–1993), CA-19 (1993–1995)
- Frank McCloskey, member of the U.S. House of Representatives from Indiana's 8th congressional district (1985–1995)
- Matthew F. McHugh, member of the U.S. House of Representatives from New York (1975–1993)
- Bruce Morrison, CT-03 (1983–1991)
- Stephen Solarz, NY-13 (1975–1993)
- Pete Stark, member of the U.S. House of Representatives from California (1973–2013)
- Ted Weiss, member of the U.S. House of Representatives from New York (1977–1992)
- Sidney R. Yates, member of the U.S. House of Representatives from Illinois's 9th congressional district (1965–1999)

Statewide officials

- Endicott Peabody, 62nd Governor of Massachusetts (1963–1965)
- John C. West, 109th Governor of South Carolina (1971–1975)

Newspapers

- The Des Moines Register

State legislators

Iowa House of Representatives

- Lowell Junkins, IA-43 (1973–1983), IA-35 (1983–1985) and Majority Leader

South Carolina Senate

- Tom Turnipseed, SC-08 (1976–1980)

Municipal officials

- Donald M. Fraser, 44th Mayor of Minneapolis (1980–1994)

Notable individuals

- Eddie Albert, actor
- Robert Foxworth, actor
- Whoopi Goldberg, actress
- Hugh Hefner, magazine publisher
- Paul Jersild, dean of Lutheran Theological Southern Seminary
- Ask Ann Landers, advice columnist
- Donna Mills, actress
- Christopher Reeve, actor
- Barbra Streisand, actress

== Works cited ==
=== Books ===
- Moreland, Laurence; Steed, Robert; Baker, Tod, eds. (1991). The 1988 Presidential Election in the South: Continuity Amidst Change in Southern Party Politics. Praeger Publishers. ISBN 0275931455.

=== Newspapers ===
- "Amy Carter endorses Jesse Jackson". Salisbury Post. February 28, 1988. p. 5A – via Newspapers.com.
- "Bush, Dole appear; Lawmakers endorse Gore". The Sheboygan Press. March 16, 1988. p. 6. Archived from the original on June 7, 2024 – via Newspapers.com.
- "Endorsements carry risk, reward". Hartford Courant. March 13, 1988. p. B11 – via Newspapers.com.
- "Eugene McCarthy flies in to make endorsement". Stevens Point Journal. March 25, 1988. p. 2 – via Newspapers.com.
- "Farrakhan endorses Jesse Jackson". Honolulu Star-Advertiser. April 14, 1988. p. A7 – via Newspapers.com.
- "For Jesse Jackson and His Campaign". The Nation. April 16, 1988. Archived from the original on January 18, 2025.
- "Georgia". The Tampa Tribune. August 30, 1987. p. 8A – via Newspapers.com.
- "Harvey Gantt Backs Jackson". The Charlotte Observer. February 21, 1988. p. 1C – via Newspapers.com.
- "Health workers' union endorses Jesse Jackson". Courier Journal. December 12, 1987. p. A9 – via Newspapers.com.
- "Hollywood stars coming out for favorite candidates". Ventura County Star. May 15, 1988. p. B6 – via Newspapers.com.
- "Iowa newspaper backs Dole, Simon". The Clarion-Ledger. February 1, 1988. p. 7A. Archived from the original on July 30, 2023 – via Newspapers.com.
- "Jackson worthy of consideration". Daily Utah Chronicle. April 25, 1988. p. 6 – via Newspapers.com.
- "Jesse Jackson wins endorsements". Lansing State Journal. March 18, 1988. p. 3B – via Newspapers.com.
- "Medhi endorses Jesse Jackson's presidential bid". The Gazette. October 24, 1987. p. 2A – via Newspapers.com.
- "Paparazzi Politics". New York Daily News. March 6, 1988. p. 5A – via Newspapers.com.
- "Philadelphia Daily News endorses Jesse Jackson". The Scranton Times-Tribune. April 22, 1988. p. 16 – via Newspapers.com.
- "Presidential campaign in S.C." The Index-Journal. March 2, 1988. p. 2 – via Newspapers.com.
- "Rallies here back Gore, Jackson". The Tennessean. March 7, 1988. p. 6A – via Newspapers.com.
- "Sound Off". The Capital Times. April 1, 1988. p. 11 – via Newspapers.com.
- "State, local officials endorse candidates". The Item. February 8, 1988. p. 5A – via Newspapers.com.
- "These are the presidential candidates favored by members of Congress from Ohio". Akron Beacon Journal. February 12, 1988. p. A12. Archived from the original on July 23, 2024 – via Newspapers.com.
- "Tracking Support". USA Today. August 7, 1987. p. 6A – via Newspapers.com.
- "Tribune Backs Gore". The Charlotte Observer. March 13, 1988. p. 8A – via Newspapers.com.
- "Tulsa ACORN Chapter Endorses Jesse Jackson". Tulsa World. March 4, 1988. p. A3 – via Newspapers.com.
- Chellgren, Mark (February 9, 1988). "Wilkinson officially endorses Gore for president". Winchester Sun. p. 3. Archived from the original on June 7, 2024 – via Newspapers.com.
- Copeskey, Jeff (February 12, 1988). "Gore visits Jackson on swing through South". The Clarion-Ledger. p. 1B. Archived from the original on July 30, 2023 – via Newspapers.com.
- Daley, Dave (April 12, 1988). "Dixon, McGee endorse Jackson for president". Dayton Daily News. p. 4A – via Newspapers.com.
- Daubenmier, Judy (November 23, 1987). "Candidates hoping endorsements will tip balance in Iowa". The Gazette. p. 4A – via Newspapers.com.
- Hardy, Thomas; Strong, James (February 12, 1988). "Chicago mayor uses rally to endorse Jesse Jackson". Arizona Daily Star. p. A7 – via Newspapers.com.
- Langford, Mark (March 3, 1988). "Texas agriculture official endorses Jesse Jackson". Kilgore News Herald. p. 5 – via Newspapers.com.
- Leggett, Jim (August 16, 1988). "Livingston touts N.O." The Town Talk. p. A3 – via Newspapers.com.
- Kurtz, Howard; Taylor, Paul (April 15, 1988). "Koch Endorses Gore". The Washington Post. Archived from the original on July 30, 2023.
- Williams, Vanessa (February 23, 1988). "Goode and others feel Jackson has a chance this time". The Philadelphia Inquirer. p. 16A – via Newspapers.com.
