= Rod Shealy =

South Carolina political consultant

Rod Shealy

Rod Shealy Sr. (December 22, 1953 – August 18, 2010) was a Republican political consultant and publisher from Lexington County, South Carolina. He worked on numerous campaigns as a political strategist, including those of André Bauer, Jim DeMint, Jake Knotts, Lindsey Graham, and George W. Bush. Shealy worked with Lee Atwater in the early 1970s and gained notoriety for negative campaigning.

Shealy owned a small chain of South Carolina newspapers including The Beaufort County News, The Lake Murray News, The Cayce-West Columbia News, The Northeast News, North Charleston News, Goose Creek, The Hanahan, and The New Irmo News. He also owned Gatsbees World Fair, an old fashioned soda shop.

== Early life ==
Rod Shealy was born on December 22, 1953 to Elsie (née Porth), who worked as an executive for World Book Encyclopedia, and Ryan Shealy, a South Carolina politician who served in the state's House and Senate. He was the second of five children. Shealy attended Lexington High School and graduated in 1972. One of his sisters, Sherry Shealy Martschink, (1949 –) served in both the SC House and Senate and ran for lieutenant governor.

== Career ==
In 1988, Shealy worked as an organizer for Taxpayers for the Lottery. The group worked to bring the lottery to South Carolina, a cause championed by Shealy's father. Shealy ran campaigns for a plethora of politicians over the years and had an impressive track record in bringing dark horse candidates to victory.

=== Benjamin Hunt Jr. ===
While running a campaign to elect his sister Sherry Martschink to Lieutenant Governor in 1990, Shealy, with the help of Robert Kohn, recruited unemployed black fisherman Benjamin Hunt Jr. to run for Congress against Republican Arthur Ravenel Jr. Shealy sought to increase the turnout of white voters by playing to the racial fears of the South Carolina electorate. He promised Hunt, who had a prior drug arrest, $900 to run for Congress and paid for his $2414 filing fee. Shealy paid for the fees with an unreported $5000 campaign contribution to his sister from Laidlaw Environmental Services.

Hunt's campaign was investigated by the solicitor's office, the FBI and the State Law Enforcement Division. Once the masquerade was uncovered, the story gained widespread media attention. At Shealy's trial, former state Representative Robert Kohn testified that he was asked by Shealy to find a black man to run against Ravenel. Shealy was convicted for violating campaign laws and fined $500. Hunt said that he never received the money he was promised in exchange for running. Shealy later referred to the fine as a "political parking ticket" and claimed it had a positive effect on his consulting business. The incident prompted a rewrite of South Carolina's ethics laws.

After the scandal, Shealy temporarily stopped working as a political consultant and developed a chain of newspapers. After a rival newspaper owner announced that he was running for state treasurer in 1994, Shealy stepped back into consulting to find a candidate to run against him.

=== "CockWheat" ===
Shealy's satirical newsletter, Gamecock Fever, drew criticism in 1991 and 1992 for its depiction of "CockWeat," a cartoon character that combined the features of Cocky, the mascot of the University of South Carolina and Buckwheat, the character from Our Gang. The CockWheat character was referred to as "U.S.C.'s Token Black Mascot" in an issue of Gamecock Fever that was distributed before a USC football game. Student leaders at the university deemed the character derogatory and called for Shealy to stop publishing the newsletter, which contains slurs against Asian, black and Hispanic students.

=== Political campaigns ===
Trey Walker, the field director for John McCain's 2000 presidential campaign, spoofed Shealy's email in 2002, when Larry Richter, Shealy's candidate for Attorney General was running against Walker's candidate, Henry McMaster. Walker sent an email that looked as if it came from one of Shealy's publications and contained allegations of a land deal between a drug dealer and Richter.

In 2003–04, Shealy was one of the political consultants hired by Thomas Ravenel of Charleston in his unsuccessful multimillion-dollar run in the Republican primary for U.S. Senate.

In 2006, Shealy ran the Republican primary campaign of André Bauer for lieutenant governor.

In 2007, Shealy represented SC Rep. Henry Brown Jr. in his 1st District Race and SC State Senator Dick Elliot in his Senate Campaign for the 2008 elections.

Shealy hired Will Folks in 2006 to work on the campaign of former State Treasurer Thomas Ravenel.

== Personal life ==
Shealy had two sons by his first wife Becky, Rod Jr. and Ross. He remarried to Pat Shealy and had a stepdaughter named Amy.

Shealy was diagnosed with melanoma in 1983 and given a 30% chance of survival. Twenty-five years later, in August 2008, he announced that the cancer had recurred. The brain tumor affected the portion of Shealy's brain that influences the ability to communicate, read and write. Oscar Lovelace, Shealy's physician said that Shealy was "having language difficulties and periods where he couldn’t remember what he needed to say. He was mixing up numbers and letters." Shealy died due to possible complications from the cancer on August 18, 2010.

Shealy was known to wear Hawaiian shirts.
