= Holly Cork =

Politician in South Carolina

Member of the South Carolina Senate from the 46th district
- In office March 17, 1992 – 1999
- Preceded by: James Madison Waddell, Jr.
- Succeeded by: Scott Head Richardson

Member of the South Carolina House of Representatives from the 123rd district
- In office October 10, 1989 – March 17, 1992
- Preceded by: William Neville Cork II
- Succeeded by: Scott Head Richardson

Personal details
- Born: March 8, 1966 (age 60) Savannah, Georgia
- Party: Republican

Holly A. Cork (born March 8, 1966) is an American politician. She served as a Republican member of the South Carolina House of Representatives from 1989 to 1992 representing District 123, and a member of the South Carolina State Senate, representing District 46 from 1992 to 1999. Cork was succeeded by Scott Head Richardson. At the time of her election in 1992, she and Sherry Shealy Martschink were the only women in the South Carolina Senate. She was a supporter of abortion rights.

In September 1996, Cork requested an opinion from the South Carolina attorney general about a referendum to establish a local-option sales tax to fund a highway construction project.

Cork graduated from the University of South Carolina in 1988 and worked as a legislative assistant for Congressman Arthur Ravenel Jr. for a year before her election to the South Carolina House of Representatives. Cork was preceded in the seat by her father William Neville Cork II, who died in 1989, and succeeded by Scott Head Richardson.
