= 1990 United States House of Representatives elections in South Carolina =

- November 6, 1990

All 6 South Carolina seats to the United States House of Representatives
	Majority party	Minority party
Party	Democratic	Republican
Last election	4	2
Seats won	4	2
Seat change	Steady	Steady
Popular vote	382,939	274,650
Percentage	57.15%	40.99%
Swing	▲1.72%	▼3.33%
District results
Democratic
60–70%
>90%
Republican
60–70%
80–90%

The 1990 United States House of Representatives elections in South Carolina were held on November 6, 1990, to select six Representatives for two-year terms from the state of South Carolina. The primary election for the Republicans was held on June 12. All six incumbents were re-elected and the composition of the state delegation remained four Democrats and two Republicans. As of 2026, this is the last time that Democrats won a majority of congressional districts in South Carolina.

== 1st congressional district ==
Incumbent Republican Congressman Arthur Ravenel, Jr. of the 1st congressional district, in office since 1987, defeated Benjamin Hunt, Jr. in the Republican primary and Democratic challenger Eugene Platt in the general election.

=== Republican primary ===
Republican primary
Candidate	Votes	%
Arthur Ravenel, Jr.	20,032	89.7
Benjamin Hunt, Jr.	2,302	10.3

=== General election results ===
South Carolina's 1st congressional district election results, 1990
Party	Candidate	Votes	%	±%
Republican	Arthur Ravenel, Jr. (incumbent)	80,842	65.5	+1.7
Democratic	Eugene Platt	42,555	34.4	−1.8
No party	Write-Ins	109	0.1	+0.1
Majority		38,287	31.1	+3.5
Turnout		123,506		
Republican hold				

== 2nd congressional district ==
Incumbent Republican Congressman Floyd Spence of the 2nd congressional district, in office since 1971, defeated Libertarian challenger Gebhard Sommer.

=== General election results ===
South Carolina's 2nd congressional district election results, 1990
Party	Candidate	Votes	%	±%
Republican	Floyd Spence (incumbent)	90,054	88.9	+36.1
Libertarian	Gebhard Sommer	11,101	10.9	+10.3
No party	Write-Ins	189	0.2	+0.2
Majority		78,953	78.0	+71.8
Turnout		101,344		
Republican hold				

== 3rd congressional district ==
Incumbent Democratic Congressman Butler Derrick of the 3rd congressional district, in office since 1975, defeated Republican challenger Ray Haskett.

=== General election results ===
South Carolina's 3rd congressional district election results, 1990
Party	Candidate	Votes	%	±%
Democratic	Butler Derrick (incumbent)	86,103	62.1	+8.4
Republican	Ray Haskett	52,433	37.8	−7.8
No party	Write-Ins	80	0.1	+0.1
Majority		33,670	24.3	+16.2
Turnout		138,616		
Democratic hold				

== 4th congressional district ==
Incumbent Democratic Congresswoman Liz J. Patterson of the 4th congressional district, in office since 1987, defeated Republican challenger Terry Haskins.

=== General election results ===
South Carolina's 4th congressional district election results, 1990
Party	Candidate	Votes	%	±%
Democratic	Liz J. Patterson (incumbent)	81,927	61.4	+9.3
Republican	Terry Haskins	51,338	38.4	−9.4
No party	Write-Ins	270	0.2	+0.1
Majority		30,589	23.0	+18.7
Turnout		133,535		
Democratic hold				

== 5th congressional district ==
Incumbent Democratic Congressman John M. Spratt, Jr. of the 5th congressional district, in office since 1983, was unopposed in his bid for re-election.

=== General election results ===
South Carolina's 5th congressional district election results, 1990
Party	Candidate	Votes	%	±%
Democratic	John M. Spratt, Jr. (incumbent)	78,203	99.8	+30.0
No party	Write-Ins	159	0.2	+0.2
Majority		78,044	99.6	+60.0
Turnout		78,362		
Democratic hold				

== 6th congressional district ==
Incumbent Democratic Congressman Robin Tallon of the 6th congressional district, in office since 1983, was unopposed in his bid for re-election.

=== General election results ===
South Carolina's 6th congressional district election results, 1990
Party	Candidate	Votes	%	±%
Democratic	Robin Tallon (incumbent)	94,121	99.6	+23.5
No party	Write-Ins	419	0.4	+0.4
Majority		93,702	99.2	+47.0
Turnout		94,540		
Democratic hold				

== See also ==
- United States House elections, 1990
- United States Senate election in South Carolina, 1990
- South Carolina gubernatorial election, 1990
- South Carolina's congressional districts
