= Senator Garrison =

Senator Garrison may refer to:

- Denzil Garrison (1926–2018), Oklahoma State Senate
- Earl Garrison (born 1941), Oklahoma State Senate
- George Tankard Garrison (1835–1889), Virginia State Senate
- T. Ed Garrison Jr. (1922–2013), South Carolina State Senate
