= Nell Whitley Smith =

American politician

Member of the South Carolina Senate from the 2nd district
- In office 1981–1991
- Preceded by: Harris Page Smith
- Succeeded by: Larry A. Martin

Personal details
- Born: November 12, 1929 Washington, North Carolina, U.S.
- Died: October 22, 2011
- Party: Democratic
- Spouse: Harris Page Smith
- Education: University of North Carolina Greensboro

Nell Whitley Smith (November 12, 1929 – October 22, 2011) was a former member of the South Carolina Senate, representing the 2nd District from 1981 until 1991.

== Early life, education and career ==
Smith grew up in North Carolina, attending Salem College in Winston-Salem, North Carolina and earning a B.S. degree in chemistry and biology at the University of North Carolina at Greensboro in 1951. She and her husband relocated to Easley, South Carolina, where she taught junior high school science and later owned the House Antiques and Gifts. Smith served on various Pickens County boards and commissions.

== Political career ==
In 1981, upon the death of her husband, State Senator Harris Page Smith, she ran successfully to fulfill his unexpired term. Smith won the seat, and went on to serve in the Senate until 1990. She served on the Senate Medical Affairs, Rules, Corrections, and Penology, Judiciary and Education committees and was selected to chair the Joint Legislative Committee on Children. In 1987, Smith was joined by Sherry Shealy Martschink to make two women in the South Carolina State Senate.

Smith chaired the Senate Rules committee, the first woman to chair a Senate committee. She retired from office in 1991.

== Community involvement and awards ==
Smith was involved heavily within her community and the state of South Carolina. In 1984 Smith won the Woman of the Year award from the Easley chapter of Business and Professional Women's Club. Following this Smith served on the President's Council of Clemson University where she received the Legislator of the Year Education award in 1986 from the Phi Delta Kappa Clemson Chapter. The following year in 1987, University of North Carolina at Greensboro gave her the Distinguished Alumni Award.

Smith's involvement in education and child focused organizations also played a large role in her life. This includes her being a member of the SC Center for Teacher Recruitment which lead to her being awarded the Distinguished Service Award by the SC Youth Workers Association as well as the SC Association of Health Educators Award, both in 1988. Along with this Smith was honored by the Mental Health Association for service to children in 1988. This constant involvement within her community resulted in her being awarded the J. McNary Spigner Award for longstanding state service to children.

== Personal life ==
Smith married Harris Page Smith in 1952, and they raised four children. Smith was survived by her four children, Sam Smith, Hugh Smith, Susan Elsken, and Phyllis Robert Sams. Her four children granted Smith with seven grandchildren and two great grandchildren to carry on her legacy.
