= Fletcher Smith =

Fletcher Smith may refer to:

- Fletcher Smith (rugby union) (born 1995), New Zealand rugby union player
- Fletcher Smith (American football) (born 1943), American football safety
- Fletcher Nathaniel Smith Jr., American politician
