= Senator Shealy =

Senator Shealy may refer to:

- Katrina Shealy (born 1954), South Carolina State Senate
- Ryan Shealy (politician) (1923–2001), South Carolina State Senate
