= Shealy =

Shealy is a family name and may refer to:

- Al Shealy (1900–1967), Major League Baseball pitcher
- Alan Shealy (born 1953), an American rower
- Courtney Shealy (born 1977), former freestyle swimmer from the United States
- Dal Shealy, 29th head college football coach for the University of Richmond Spiders
- Katrina Shealy (born 1954), an American politician
- Rick Shealy, American politician from South Carolina
- Rod Shealy, Republican political consultant and publisher from South Carolina
- Ryan Shealy, Major League Baseball first baseman for the Tampa Bay Rays
- Shack Shealy, former head coach of the Clemson college football program
- Steadman S. Shealy, American attorney and former college quarterback
- Vic Shealy, American football assistant coach for the Kansas Jayhawks

== See also ==
- Sheely
- Sheeley
