= Chip Campsen =

American politician

George E. "Chip" Campsen III

Member of the South Carolina Senate from the 43rd district
- Incumbent
- Assumed office 2004
- Preceded by: John R. Kuhn

Member of the South Carolina House of Representatives from the 112th district
- In office 1996–2002
- Preceded by: Harry Hallman
- Succeeded by: Ben A. Hagood Jr.

Personal details
- Born: George Earle Campsen III; March 30, 1959 (age 67) Charleston, South Carolina, U.S.
- Party: Republican
- Spouse: Lalla Lee Laffitte
- Children: 2
- Education: Furman University (BS); University of South Carolina (JD), (MS)

George E. "Chip" Campsen III (born March 30, 1959) is an American politician. He is a member of the Republican party.

== Political career ==
Campsen is a Republican member of the South Carolina Senate, representing the 43rd District since 2004. Previously, he was a member of the South Carolina House of Representatives from 1996 through 2002.

Campsen currently chairs the Senate Fish, Game and Forestry Committee, and serves on the Senate Judiciary, Legislative Oversight, Rules, and Transportation Committees.

He was the only state senator that voted against the Base Load Review Act in 2004 that led to the failure of the VC Summer Nuclear Project expansion.

In June 2023, Campsen endorsed Tim Scott in the 2024 United States presidential election.

In 2024, Campsen was among the state legislators appointed to serve on the Robert Smalls Monument Commission.
