= Raye Felder =

American politician (born 1962)

Member of the South Carolina House of Representatives from the 26th district
- Incumbent
- Assumed office 2012
- Preceded by: Eric Bikas
- Succeeded by: David Martin (South Carolina politician)

Personal details
- Born: March 3, 1962 (age 64) Fort Mill, South Carolina, U.S.
- Party: Republican
- Education: Limestone College (BS)

Regina Raye Felder (born March 3, 1962) is an American politician. She is a member of the South Carolina House of Representatives from the 26th District, serving since 2012. She is a member of the Republican party.

In 2024, Felder announced that she will not be running for re-election. Felder was succeeded by David Martin in the November general election.
