= Rex Rice =

American politician from South Carolina

Member of the South Carolina Senate from the 2nd district
- Incumbent
- Assumed office November 14, 2016
- Preceded by: Larry A. Martin

Member of the South Carolina House of Representatives from the 26th district
- In office 1994–2010
- Preceded by: Jim Mattos
- Succeeded by: Eric Bikas

Personal details
- Born: May 9, 1957 (age 69) Pensacola, Florida
- Party: Republican
- Spouse: Ruth Britts (m. 1982)
- Children: 2
- Education: Anderson College; University of South Carolina
- Occupation: Politician, businessman

Rex Fontaine Rice (born May 9, 1957) is an American politician and businessman currently serving as the senator for South Carolina's 2nd Senate District, a position he has held since 2016. He previously served as the representative for House District 26 in the South Carolina House of Representatives from 1994 to 2010. Known for his fiscal conservatism, Rice has advocated for state control over education and environmental issues, the repeal of the No Child Left Behind Act, and the abolition of income tax in favor of increased sales taxes. He is a member of the Republican Party.

== S.C. House of Representatives (1994-2010) ==
Rice was first elected to represent South Carolina State House District 26 in 1994. He did not seek re-election in 2010, instead opting to run for South Carolina's 3rd Congressional District when Gresham Barrett stepped down to run for Governor of South Carolina in the 2010 election.

As a house representative, Rice was a recognized fiscal conservative. He advocated for the idea that education and environment issues should be left entirely to the states. An example of this was his advocacy for the repeal of the No Child Left Behind Act. Additionally, he argued for the abolition of income tax in favor of expanded regressive tax policies such as the increase of sales tax.

== S.C. Senate ==
Rice has represented the 2nd Senate District (parts of Pickens County) since 2016, when he defeated longtime incumbent Larry Martin during the Republican primary.

As of April 2024, Rice serves on the Corrections and Penology Committee, the Education Committee, the Judiciary Committee, the Labor, Commerce and Industry Committee, and the Transportation Committee.

Since 2022, he has opposed efforts to pass a hate crime bill in South Carolina.

In February 2023, he filed a resolution to limit congressional terms. This would make South Carolina one of 34 states that would need to call a national convention to amend the US Constitution.

In November 2023, he sponsored Constitutional Carry legislation to relax gun control laws by lowering the age of carrying a handgun and getting rid of requiring permits, training, and background checks.

=== Reproductive rights ===
As a Senator, Rice has supported a near-total ban on abortion, without exceptions for rape or incest. Instead, he supports exceptions only in cases where a mother's life might be at risk.

== Controversies ==
=== Dark money ads ===
Rice tried (and failed) to unseat Larry Martin in 2012. In 2016, when Rice re-challenged Martin, the Republican primary became highly contentious. During the run-off, dark money ad donors funded attack ads against Martin, though Rice denied any role in their funding.

== Personal life ==
Rice lives in Easley, South Carolina with his wife Ruth. He owns a construction company. He is Presbyterian. He graduated from Anderson University and the University of South Carolina.

== Electoral history ==
Year	Office	Type	Party	Main opponent	Party	Votes for Rice				Result	Swing	Ref.
Year	Office	Type	Party	Main opponent	Party	Total	%	P.	±%	Result	Swing	Ref.
1992	S.C. Representative	General	Republican	Jim Mattos (Note: Incumbent seeking re-election.)	Democratic	3,594	46.01%	2nd	N/A	Lost	Hold	
1994	S.C. Representative	General	Republican	Jim Mattos	Democratic	3,409	53.74%	1st	+7.73%	Won	Gain	
1996	S.C. Representative	General	Republican	Write-in	N/A	5,269	100.00%	1st	+46.26%	Won	Hold	
1998	S.C. Representative	General	Republican	Write-in	N/A	5,508	98.48%	1st	-1.52%	Won	Hold	
2000	S.C. Representative	General	Republican	Write-in	N/A	6,868	98.52%	1st	+0.04%	Won	Hold	
2002	S.C. Representative	General	Republican	Write-in	N/A	5,823	98.56%	1st	+0.04%	Won	Hold	
2004	S.C. Representative	General	Republican	Write-in	N/A	8,360	99.57%	1st	+1.01%	Won	Hold	
2006	S.C. Representative	General	Republican	Write-in	N/A	5,685	99.37%	1st	-0.20%	Won	Hold	
2008	S.C. Representative	General	Republican	Write-in	N/A	9,371	99.17%	1st	-0.20%	Won	Hold	
2010	U.S. Representative	Rep. primary	Republican	Jeff Duncan	Republican	16,071	19.47%	3rd	N/A	Lost	N/A	
2012	S.C. Senator	General	Petition	Larry A. Martin	Republican	13,164	35.31%	2nd	N/A	Lost	Hold	
2016	S.C. Senator	Rep. primary	Republican	Larry A. Martin	Republican	4,641	33.30%	2nd	N/A	Runoff	N/A	
2016	S.C. Senator	Rep. primary runoff	Republican	Larry A. Martin	Republican	6,022	54.21%	1st	N/A	Won	N/A	
2016	S.C. Senator	General	Republican	Write-in	N/A	36,944	98.64%	1st	N/A	Won	Hold	
2020	S.C. Senator	General	Republican	Write-in	N/A	44,116	98.10%	1st	-0.54%	Won	Hold	

== Notes ==
South Carolina House of Representatives
Preceded by Jim Mattos	Member of the South Carolina House of Representatives from the 26th district 1994–2010	Succeeded by Eric Bikas
South Carolina Senate
Preceded by Larry A. Martin	Member of the South Carolina Senate from the 2nd district 2016–present	Incumbent
