= Samuel Boan =

Financial Manager and politician

Otis Samuel Boan, Jr.

Member of the South Carolina Senate from the 7th district
- In office 1995-1997
- Preceded by: Theo Mitchell
- Succeeded by: Ralph Anderson

Personal details
- Born: February 10, 1952 Bennettsville, South Carolina, U.S.
- Died: February 13, 2019 (aged 67) Greenville, SC
- Party: Republican
- Education: University of South Carolina

O. Samuel 'Sammy' Boan (February 10, 1952 – February 13, 2019) was a financial manager and politician from South Carolina. He served in the South Carolina Senate.

== Early life ==
Boan, the son of O. Samuel Boan Sr., and Maxine Hendricks Boan, was born in Bennettsville and grew up in Cheraw, graduating from Cheraw High School.

== Political career ==
Boan served in the South Carolina General Assembly from 1995 to 1997. He won the Republican primary special election against Lawrence Acker, a Black attorney. Boan was elected to fill the unexpired term of Senator Theo Mitchell, during an election with concerns expressed about race and representation.

== Subsequent career ==
Boan was a board member of American Services, Inc., a company co-founded by his late father. He retired in 2017 from the family business in the consumer finance industry.

== Personal life ==
Mitchell married Ellen Rushing, and they had two daughters. They attended St. Paul's Anglican Church in Greenville.
