= Karl B. Allen =

American politician

Member of the South Carolina Senate from the 7th district
- Incumbent
- Assumed office 2012
- Preceded by: Ralph Anderson

Member of the South Carolina House of Representatives from the 25th district
- In office 2001–2012
- Preceded by: Willie B. McMahand
- Succeeded by: Leola C. Robinson-Simpson

Personal details
- Born: Karl B. Allen; October 13, 1960 (age 65) Greenville, South Carolina
- Party: Democratic
- Education: University of South Carolina (BA, 1982); University of South Carolina (JD, 1986)
- Profession: Attorney, politician

Karl B. Allen (born October 13, 1960) is a Democratic member of the South Carolina Senate, representing the state's 7th Senate District (Greenville County, South Carolina) since 2012. Previously, he served the 25th House District in the South Carolina House of Representatives from 2001 to 2012. He is an attorney.

== S.C. House of Representatives (2001-2012) ==
Allen served in the South Carolina House of Representatives from 2001 to 2012 representing the 25th district (a portion of Greenville County).

== S.C. Senate ==
Allen has been the Senator for South Carolina's 7th Senate district since 2012, when previous Senator Ralph Anderson announced his retirement from the Senate.

Following redistricting after the 2020 US Census, S.C. Senate District 7 covers a cross-section of Greenville County, South Carolina.

== Personal life ==
Allen resides in Greenville, South Carolina. He has one daughter. He is a graduate from the University of South Carolina, both as an undergraduate and as a law school graduate. Previously, he was the president of The National Association Of Blacks In Criminal Justice (NABCJ).

== Electoral history ==
Year	Office	Type	Party	Main opponent	Party	Votes for Allen				Result	Swing	Ref.
Year	Office	Type	Party	Main opponent	Party	Total	%	P.	±%	Result	Swing	Ref.
2000	S.C. Representative	Dem. primary	Democratic	L. R. Byrd	Democratic	920	48.07%	1st	N/A	Runoff	N/A	
2000	S.C. Representative	Dem. primary runoff	Democratic	L. R. Byrd	Democratic	725	63.48%	1st	N/A	Won	N/A	
2000	S.C. Representative	General	Democratic	Write-in	N/A	7,241	98.34%	1st	N/A	Won	Hold	
2002	S.C. Representative	Dem. primary	Democratic	L. R. Byrd	Democratic	1,057	86.36%	1st	+22.88%	Won	N/A	
2002	S.C. Representative	General	Democratic	Write-in	N/A	6,338	98.55%	1st	+0.21%	Won	Hold	
2004	S.C. Representative	General	Democratic	Write-in	N/A	8,976	99.42%	1st	+0.87%	Won	Hold	
2006	S.C. Representative	General	Democratic	Write-in	N/A	5,207	99.31%	1st	-0.11%	Won	Hold	
2008	S.C. Representative	General	Democratic	Rick Freeman	Republican	9,877	76.73%	1st	-22.58%	Won	Hold	
2010	S.C. Representative	General	Democratic	Write-in	N/A	6,893	98.64%	1st	+21.91%	Won	Hold	
2012	S.C. Senator	Dem. primary	Democratic	Lillian Brock Flemming	Democratic	2,331	54.83%	1st	N/A	Won	N/A	
2012	S.C. Senator	General	Democratic	Jane Kizer	Republican	20,559	61.09%	1st	N/A	Won	Hold	
2012	S.C. Senator	General	Working Families	Jane Kizer	Republican	1,405	4.18%	3rd	N/A	Won	Hold	
2016	S.C. Senator	Dem. primary	Democratic	Lillian Brock Flemming	Democratic	2,749	71.07%	1st	+16.24%	Won	N/A	
2016	S.C. Senator	General	Democratic	Glen L. Robinson	Republican	21,518	61.86%	1st	+0.75%	Won	Hold	
2020	S.C. Senator	Dem. primary	Democratic	Fletcher Smith	Democratic	6,210	70.11%	1st	-0.96%	Won	N/A	
2020	S.C. Senator	General	Democratic	Jack Logan	Republican	26,672	62.51%	1st	+0.65%	Won	Hold	
2024	S.C. Senator	Dem. primary	Democratic	Michelle Goodwin-Calwile	Democratic	2,576	68.02%	1st	-2.09%	Won	N/A	

South Carolina House of Representatives
Preceded by Willie B. McMahand	Member of the South Carolina House of Representatives from the 25th district 2001–2012	Succeeded by Leola C. Robinson-Simpson
South Carolina Senate
Preceded by Ralph Anderson	Member of the South Carolina Senate from the 7th district 2012–present	Incumbent
