= Ennis M. Fant =

American politician

Ennis M. Fant Sr.

Member of the South Carolina House of Representatives from the 23rd district
- In office 1989–1991
- Preceded by: Sara Beatty Shelton
- Succeeded by: Ralph Anderson (politician)

Personal details
- Party: Democratic

Ennis Maurice Fant Sr., (born 1943) is an American politician.

== Political career ==
Fant currently serves on Greenville County Council representing District 25, and is Senior Pastor of Pleasantville Missionary Baptist Church in Powdersville, South Carolina.

Fant served as a Democratic member for the 23rd district in the South Carolina House of Representatives from 1985 to 1991. Fant lost his seat as a result of Operation Lost Trust.

=== 2012 State Senate race ===
In 2012, Fant filed to run for South Carolina Senate District 7, when Ralph Anderson was considering stepping down.

=== 2024 County Council race ===
In 2024, Fant was challenged by Lisa Sweeney, Patrick Prince, and activist Derrick Quarles, who had previously run for South Carolina House of Representatives District 25. Fant narrowly defeated Quarles in a contested runoff on June 25.

== 1991 Felony Arrest ==
 Ennis Fant ("appellant"), a former South Carolina Representative, was indicted in October 1990, on one count of conspiracy to commit extortion, and on two substantive counts of extortion under color of official right (taking a bribe as a public official) in violation of 18 U.S.C, 1951 and 1952 ("the Hobbs act").  pursuant to plea agreement, appellant plead guilty to the conspiracy count.  On July 31, 1991, appellant was sentenced to 20 months incarceration.
