= John R. Kuhn =

American politician

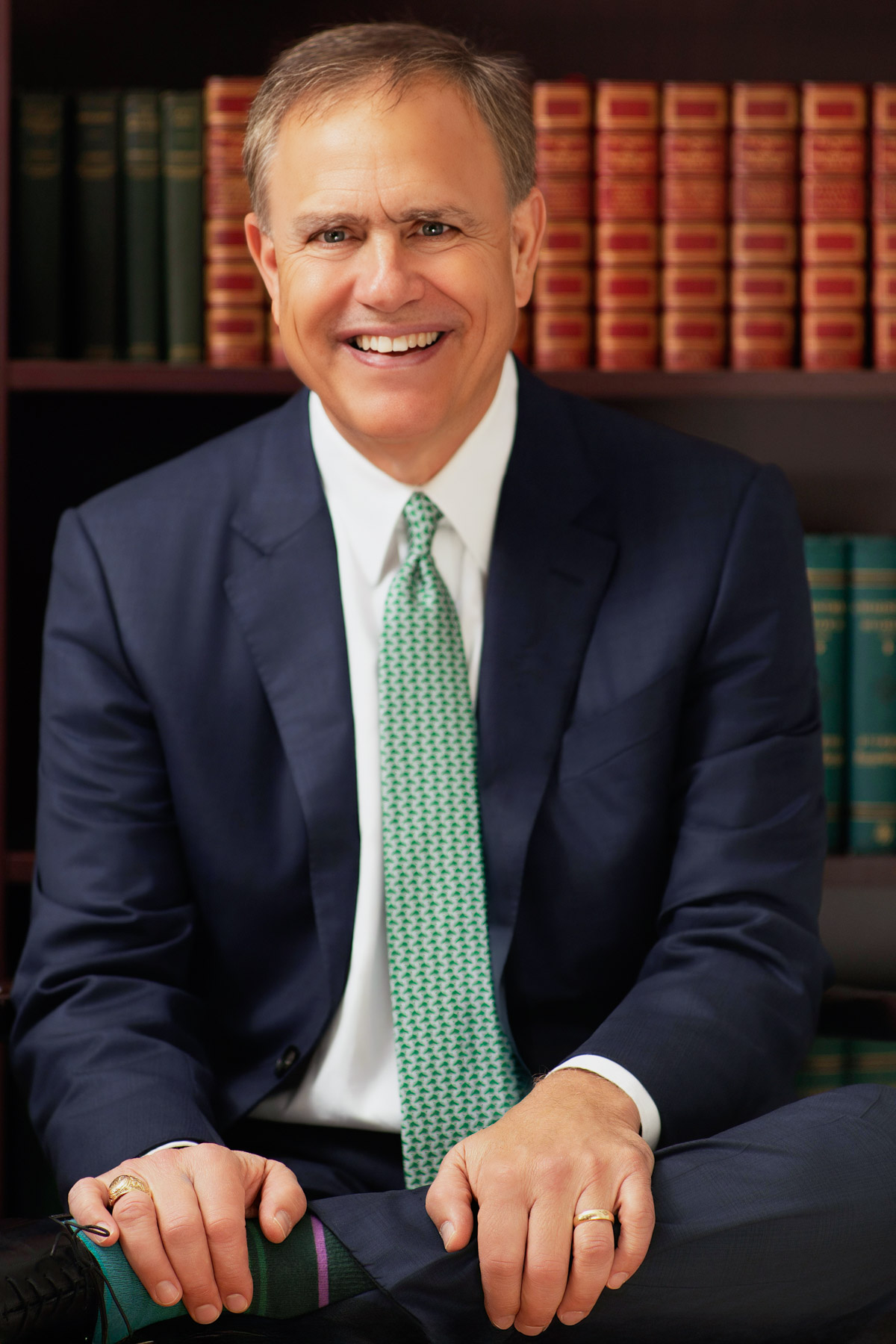
- Portrait of John R. Kuhn

Member of the South Carolina Senate from the 43rd district
- In office 2001–2003
- Preceded by: Ernie Passailaigue
- Succeeded by: Chip Campsen

Personal details
- Born: John Robert Kuhn; July 31, 1962 (age 64)
- Party: Republican
- Spouse: Augusta Porcher Hipp
- Children: 3
- Education: Vanderbilt University (BA); The John Marshall Law School (JD)
- Profession: Attorney

John Robert Kuhn (born July 31, 1962) is an American author and former politician. He served as a member of the South Carolina Senate from 2001 to 2003, representing the 43rd District. In 2025, he published I Tell It Like It Is!, the first volume of an autobiographical trilogy.

== Early life and education ==
John Robert Kuhn was born on July 31, 1962, in El Centro, California, in the Imperial Valley. He was the elder of two sons of Fritz Kuhn Jr., a farmer in Imperial County, and Madeline Hall Kuhn, a high school teacher who had graduated from Stanford University in 1948. The Kuhn family had farmed in the Imperial Valley since the early 1900s. His younger brother, James "Jim" Kuhn, was born in 1964 and died in 2005.

Kuhn attended Culver Military Academy in Culver, Indiana, from 1976 to 1980, where he served on the staff of the school newspaper, The Culver Vedette. He later received a Bachelor of Arts in English from Vanderbilt University in 1986 and a Juris Doctor from The John Marshall Law School (now UIC School of Law) in Chicago in 1993.

In the late 1980s, Kuhn and his brother were among the first growers in the Imperial Valley to compress and export hay directly to dairy farms in Japan.

== Political career ==
=== South Carolina Senate ===
Kuhn was a Republican member of the South Carolina Senate, representing the 43rd District from 2001 to 2003. He was defeated in a Republican primary by Chip Campsen, former member of the SC House and former aide to Mark Sanford.

=== 2013 US House special election ===
In 2013, Kuhn ran for the South Carolina's 1st congressional district in a special election. The victor would fill the US House seat vacated by Tim Scott, who was appointed by Governor Nikki Haley to fill the vacated seat of Jim DeMint. Kuhn was defeated in the Republican primary.

== Community service ==
Kuhn served on the Foreign Affairs Forum of Charleston, the South Carolina State Ethics Commission, and the South Carolina Bar Association.

== Party leadership ==
Kuhn briefly served as Chair of the Charleston County Republican Party - he was elected in April 2019 and stepped down in January 2020.

== Controversies ==
On March 14, 2024, Kuhn was arrested following a March 7 hit-and-run traffic incident in Charleston involving another vehicle and a pedestrian. He was charged with hit-and-run resulting in property damage, but was not charged in connection with the pedestrian. He was released on a personal recognizance bond. Prosecutors in Horry County dismissed the case on August 9, 2024.

On May 30, 2024, Kuhn was arrested and booked into the Sheriff Al Cannon Detention Center on a simple assault charge stemming from an alleged May 21 altercation. A municipal judge dismissed the case in March 2025 after Kuhn entered a pretrial intervention program.

On August 19, 2024, Kuhn's law license was placed on interim suspension, in an order signed by South Carolina Supreme Court Justice John W. Kittredge.
