= Ralph Anderson (politician) =

American politician (1927–2019)

Member of the South Carolina Senate from the 7th district
- In office 1996–2013
- Preceded by: Samuel Boan
- Succeeded by: Karl B. Allen

Member of the South Carolina House of Representatives from the 23 district
- Preceded by: Ennis M. Fant
- Succeeded by: Fletcher Nathaniel Smith Jr.

Personal details
- Born: November 2, 1927 Greenville, South Carolina
- Died: November 30, 2019 (aged 92) Greenville, South Carolina
- Party: Democratic
- Spouse: Geraldine
- Education: Allen University; Howard University

Ralph Anderson (November 2, 1927 – November 30, 2019) was a Democratic member of the South Carolina Senate, representing the 7th District from 1997 to 2013. Prior to being elected to the State Senate, Anderson served in the South Carolina House of Representatives from 1991 to 1997.

== Education ==
Ralph Anderson received his education from the following institutions:

- Sterling High School (South Carolina) in Greenville
- BA, Allen University, 1949
- Graduate Studies, Howard University

== Political experience ==
Ralph Anderson had the following political experience:

- Senator, South Carolina State Senate, 1997–2013
- Representative, South Carolina State House of Representatives, 1991–1997
- Council Member, City of Greenville, 1983–1991
- Board of Directors, Greater Greenville Chamber of Commerce, 1983–1985
- City of Greenville Zoning Board, 1982–1983
- Commissioner, Greenville Civil Service Commission, 1969–1973

== Legislative Committees ==
Ralph Anderson was a member of the following committees:

- Corrections and Penology, Member
- Education, Member
- Finance, Member
- Medical Affairs, Member
- Transportation, Member
- Caucuses/Non-Legislative Committees
- Board Member, Community Planning Council
- Member, Greenville Civil Service Commission
- Representative of the City, Greenville Housing Authority Board

== Professional Experience ==
Ralph Anderson had the following professional experience:

- Retired
- Postmaster, United States Postal Service, 1970–1983
- Non-Commissioned Officer, United States Army, Fort Jackson/Germany, 1950–1952

== Organizations ==
Ralph Anderson was a member of the following organizations:

- President, Board of Directors, Phyllis Wheatley Center, 1985–1991
- Member, Municipal Association of South Carolina, 1986–1988
- Staffer, Family Counseling Services, 1983–1986
- Board Member, Greenville YMCA, 1969–1973
- Executive Member, Appalachian Council of Governments
- Member, Greenville Regional Board of Directors, BB&T Bank
- Board Member, Community Foundation of Greater Greensville, Incorporated
- Member, Freemasons
- First Vice President, Greenville Chapter, NCAAP (National Association for the Advancement of Colored People)
- Member, Board of Trustees, Saint Anthony's Catholic School, Greenville
- Board Member, Senior Action of Greenville County
- Board Member, Sunbelt Human Advancement Resources

== Retirement ==
On March 21, 2012, Anderson announced he would not seek re-election. He died on November 30, 2019, at age 92.

== Legacy and recognitions ==
In November 2023, the Ralph Anderson Pedestrian Bridge was dedicated.
