= David Martin (South Carolina politician) =

American politician

Member of the South Carolina House of Representatives from the 26th district
- Incumbent
- Assumed office November 11, 2024
- Preceded by: Raye Felder

Personal details
- Party: Republican
- Education: Coastal Carolina University; Charlotte School of Law
- Profession: Attorney

David Martin is an American politician. He is a member of the South Carolina House of Representatives from the 26th District, serving since 2024. The District includes Fort Mill between I-77 and Lancaster County. Martin is a member of the Republican party.

== Political career ==
In 2024, Republican incumbent Raye Felder announced that she would not be running for re-election. Martin ran in the Republican primary for the seat, defeating fellow Republican Elizabeth Enns. He defeated Democratic opponent Matt Vilardebo in the general election.

Martin serves on the House Judiciary and the Regulations, Administration Procedures, Artificial Intelligence and Cybersecurity committees.
