= 1990 Ecuadorian parliamentary election =

Parliamentary elections were held in Ecuador on 17 June 1990. Only the 60 district members of the House of Representatives were elected. The Social Christian Party emerged as the largest party, winning 15 of the 60 seats.

== Results ==
Party	Votes	%	Seats
Social Christian Party	723,428	24.45	15
Ecuadorian Roldosist Party	438,166	14.81	9
Democratic Left	385,650	13.04	11
Popular Democracy	297,186	10.05	7
Socialist Party	262,360	8.87	7
Democratic People's Movement	146,979	4.97	1
Conservative Party	125,308	4.24	2
Alfarista Radical Front	123,990	4.19	1
Concentration of People's Forces	122,982	4.16	3
Ecuadorian Radical Liberal Party	97,933	3.31	3
Ecuadorian Revolutionary Popular Action	63,466	2.15	0
Broad Front of the Left	63,063	2.13	1
National Liberation	52,545	1.78	0
People's Party	29,264	0.99	0
People, Change, Democracy	26,157	0.88	0
Total	2,958,477	100.00	60
Valid votes	2,958,477	83.08	
Invalid/blank votes	602,604	16.92	
Total votes	3,561,081	100.00	
Registered voters/turnout	5,259,114	67.71	
Source: Nohlen
