= Eric Bikas =

American politician

Member of the South Carolina House of Representatives from the 26th district
- In office 2010–2012
- Preceded by: Rex Rice
- Succeeded by: Raye Felder

Personal details
- Party: Republican

Eric J. Bikas is an American politician. He is a former member of the South Carolina House of Representatives from the 26th District, serving from 2010 to 2012. He is a member of the Republican party.

== Political career ==
In 2010, Republican incumbent Rex Rice did not seek re-election for State House District 26, seeking instead to run for Congressional seat to be vacated by Gresham Barrett. Bikas filed for the House seat, defeating Christopher Wilson in the Republican primary and Democratic nominee Judy Gilstrap in the general election.

In 2012, Bikas announced that he would not seek re-election. He was succeeded by Raye Felder in the November general election.
