= 1990 United States Senate election in Kansas =

- November 6, 1990
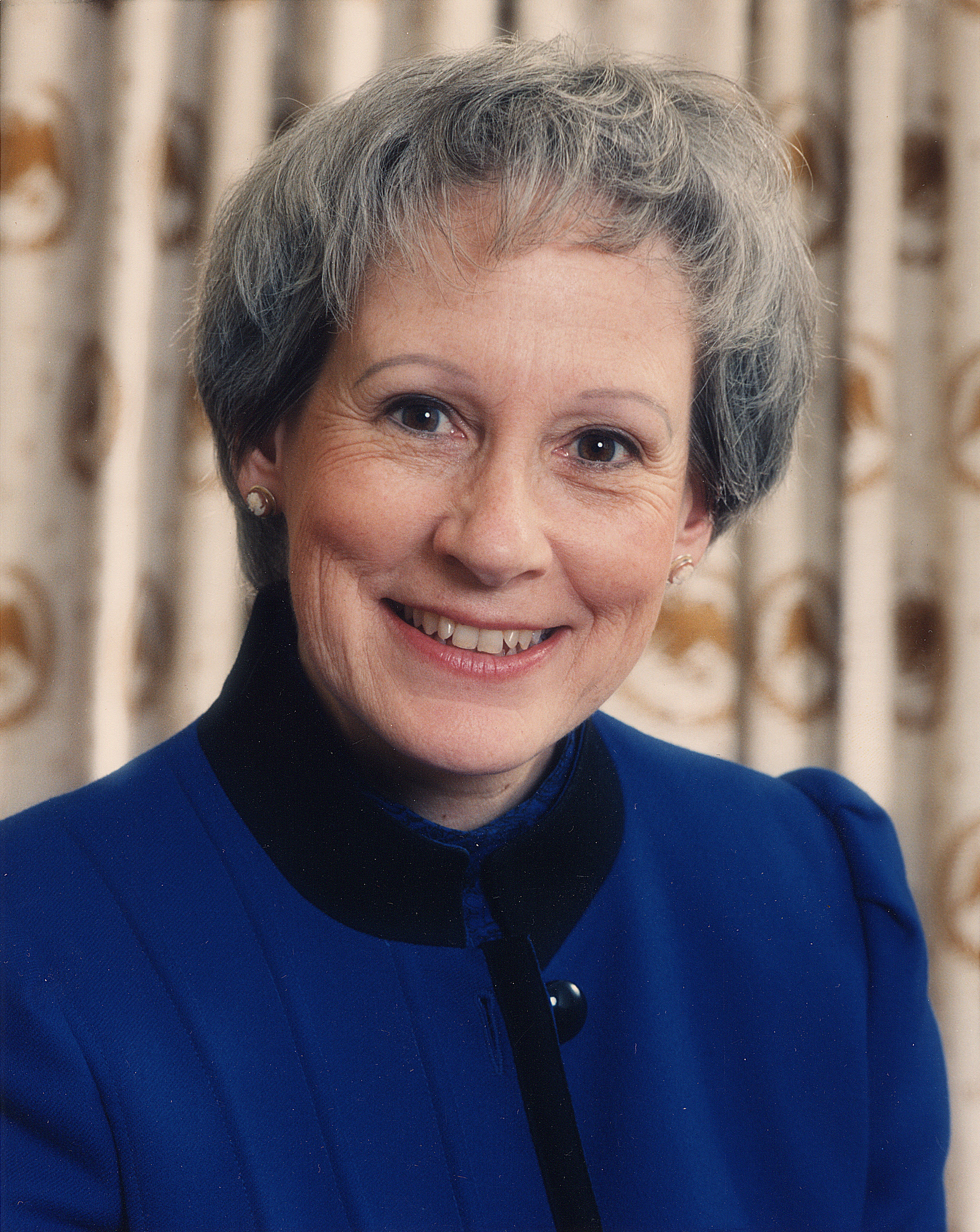

Nominee	Nancy Kassebaum	Dick Williams
Party	Republican	Democratic
Popular vote	578,605	207,491
Percentage	73.60%	26.40%
- County results Kassebaum: 60–70% 70–80% 80–90%
U.S. senator before election
Nancy Kassebaum
Republican
Elected U.S. Senator
Nancy Kassebaum
Republican

The 1990 United States Senate election in Kansas was held November 6, 1990. Incumbent Republican U.S. Senator Nancy Kassebaum was re-elected for a third full term.

== Candidates ==
=== Democratic ===
- Dick Williams, educator at Wichita State University (replacing William R. Roy)

=== Republican ===
- Nancy Kassebaum, incumbent U.S. Senator

== Results ==
General election results
Party	Candidate	Votes	%
Republican	Nancy Kassebaum (Incumbent)	578,605	73.60%
Democratic	Dick Williams	207,491	26.40%
Republican hold			

== See also ==
- 1990 United States Senate elections
