= Larry A. Martin =

American politician

Member of the South Carolina Senate from the 2nd district
- In office 1992–2017
- Preceded by: Nell Whitley Smith
- Succeeded by: Rex Rice

Personal details
- Born: June 20, 1957 (age 69) Greenville, South Carolina, U.S.
- Party: Republican
- Spouse: Susan

Larry A. Martin (born June 20, 1957) is a Republican and a former member of the South Carolina Senate, representing the 2nd District since 1992 until 2017. In 2012, he was named Chairman of the Senate Judiciary Committee. He previously served in the South Carolina House of Representatives from 1979 through 1992. He was the youngest member of the SC House for six years, and his thirty-eight years of total service in the General Assembly is a record for any member from Pickens County. Martin is believed to have been the only non-lawyer to serve as chairman of the Senate Judiciary Committee. He was a leader in enacting tougher domestic violence laws, ethics reform, tort reform, stronger DUI laws, and more executive control of state agencies.

== Personal ==
Martin graduated from Pickens High School and attended Tri-County Technical College. Martin was employed by Alice Manufacturing for thirty-six years and retired in 2018. Martin is married to Susan Lynn Evatt and they have three children and five grandchildren.

== Community involvement ==
Martin attends Pickens First Baptist Church, where he has served as Deacon, Church Moderator, and Sunday School Teacher.

Martin has served President of Pickens County United Way (1983), as the Chairman of the Governor's School-to-Work Council(1997–99) and as the Chairman of the Tax Study Committee(1998). In addition, he has served as a member of the advisory committee of Pickens First National Bank, the Economic Development Committee of the Southern Legislative Conference. In retirement, Martin is serving on the Prisma Health Baptist Easley Hospital Foundation Board, the Pickens County Cancer Society Board, and the county's advisory board for Upstate Warriors Solution.

== Awards ==
- Outstanding Young Men of America, 1979
- Who's Who in American Politics, 1981–82, 1983–84
- Personalities of the South, 1982–83
- National Federation of Independent Business "Guardian of Small Business" Award, 1999;
- S.C. Chamber of Commerce Public Servant of the Year, 2002;
- "Guardian of Home Rule" Award, 2003;
- Anderson-Oconee-Pickens Area Mental Health "Patrick B. Harris Humanitarian Award for Public Serv.," 2003
- 2004 Legislator of the Year Award by the National Federation of the Blind of S.C.
- Legislator of the Year for the Senate by the S.C. Human Services Providers Association, 2005
- National Alliance on Mental Illness "Mental Illness Champion 2006"
- Greenville Hospital System Children's Hospital Development Council "Legislative Advocacy Award for 2006"
- S.C. Commission for the Blind Legislator of the Year, 2006
- Conservation Voters of S.C., 2006 "Conservation Champion"
- .C. Manufacturers Alliance "Defender of Manufacturing 2007" Award
- Fraternal Order of Police, "2007 Senator of the Year"
- S.C. Apartment Association, "2007 Legislator of the Year"
- Home Builders Association of S.C., "2008 Hammer & Trowel Award"
- Palmetto Family Council, "2008 Legislator of the Year"
- Special recognition of service by S.C. Baptist Convention, Nov. 2008
- S.C. REALTORS, "2009 Legislator of the Year"
- S.C. Education Association Friend of Education, 2011
- SC Farm Bureau Legislator of the Year Award, 2012
- MADD 2013 Legislator of the Year
- SC Sheriff's Association Legislator of the Year 2013
- Behavior Health Services Legislator of the Year 2013
- United Way SC Common Good Award for Volunteerism 2014
- SC League of Women Voters Issues and Action Award 2016
- SC Victim Assistance Network Public Service Award for combatting Domestic Violence 2016
- Order of the Palmetto 2016 by Governor Haley
- 2017 Public Servant of the Year, Upstate Forever
- 2017 Duke Energy Citizenship & Service Award by the Greater Easley Chamber of Commerce
