= DeWitt Williams =

American politician

Member of the South Carolina House of Representatives from the 102nd district
- In office 1983–1996

Member of the South Carolina State Senate
- In office 1996–1997

Personal details
- Born: October 12, 1919 Saint Stephen, South Carolina
- Died: January 27, 2016 (aged 96) Moncks Corner, South Carolina
- Party: Democratic

DeWitt Williams (October 12, 1919 – January 27, 2016) was an American politician in the state of South Carolina. He served in the South Carolina House of Representatives as a member of the Democratic Party from 1981 to 1986, representing Berkeley County, South Carolina. He resides in Saint Stephen, South Carolina. He served as mayor pro tempore of Saint Stephen from 1974 to 1979. A portion of is South Carolina Highway 45 in Berkeley County is named "DeWitt Williams Boulevard", in his honor.
