= National Liberation =

Political party in Ecuador

National Liberation (Spanish: Liberación Nacional) was a political party in Ecuador. The party, which was accorded the number '11' by the electoral authorities, was born through a split from FADI in 1989. The party was founded by students and middle class sectors. It obtained 1.8% of the votes in 1990 and 0.8% in 1996.
