= John James Snow Jr. =

American politician (1929–2025)

Member of the South Carolina House of Representatives from the 103rd district
- In office 1977–1994
- Succeeded by: Carl Anderson
- In office 2001–2004

Personal details
- Born: December 19, 1929 Kingstree, South Carolina, U.S.
- Died: March 17, 2025 (aged 95) Mt. Pleasant, South Carolina, U.S.
- Party: Democratic; Republican (2004)
- Education: Clemson University

John James "Bubber" Snow Jr. (December 19, 1929 – March 17, 2025) was an American politician in the state of South Carolina.

== Early years, education and career ==
In 1954, Snow graduated from Clemson University with a Bachelor of Science degree. Snow was also a farmer and businessman.

== Political career ==
Snow served in the South Carolina House of Representatives as a member of the Democratic Party from 1977 to 1994 and 2001 to 2004, representing Williamsburg County, South Carolina.

Snow chaired the House Agriculture Committee. In 2004, Snow switched from the Democratic to the Republican Party for his re-election bid.

Snow was credited with making the Carolina Shag the State dance and beach music the official popular music for South Carolina in 1984.

In May 2024, Senator Luke A. Rankin sponsored a Resolution recognizing Snow on the 40th Anniversary of the Shag becoming South Carolina's State dance.

== Personal life ==
In 1957, Snow married Penelope Y. Grainger. The couple had three children.

== Death ==
Snow died on March 17, 2025 in Mt. Pleasant, South Carolina. Governor Henry McMaster ordered that flags in the state be flown half-staff on Sunday, April 6, 2025 to honor his service.
