= Jim Mattos =

American politician (1932–2020)

Member of the South Carolina House of Representatives from the 26th district
- In office 1985–1994
- Preceded by: Herbert Curry Granger
- Succeeded by: Rex Rice

Personal details
- Born: January 25, 1932 Spartanburg, South Carolina
- Died: March 19, 2020 (aged 88) Greenville, South Carolina
- Party: Democratic

James George 'Jim' Mattos (January 25, 1932 - March 19, 2020) was an American politician in the state of South Carolina. He served in the South Carolina House of Representatives as a member of the Democratic Party from 1985 to 1994 representing Greenville County, South Carolina. He was a teacher and coach.
