= Ernie Passailaigue =

American politician

Member of the South Carolina Senate from the 43rd district
- In office November 11, 1988 – November 10, 2000
- Preceded by: W. Sam Applegate
- Succeeded by: John R. Kuhn

Personal details
- Born: Ernest Leroy Passailaigue Jr. November 9, 1947 (age 78) Charleston, South Carolina
- Spouse: Margie
- Children: 5
- Education: University of South Carolina (BS); The Citadel (MBA)
- Profession: Certified Public Accountant

Ernest Leroy Passailaigue Jr (born November 9, 1947) is an American politician and former member of the South Carolina Senate.

== Political career ==
=== South Carolina Senate ===
Passailaigue was a member of the South Carolina Senate, representing the 43rd District from 1988 to 2001.

During this time, he served on the Joint Legislative Committee on Cultural Affairs; the Joint Legislative Committee on Aging, and the Joint Legislative Committee to Review Intrabudgetary Transfers of Funds to the Department of Highways and Public Transportation.

=== 1990 Gubernatorial race ===
In 1990, Passailaigue ran for Governor of South Carolina. He was defeated in the Democratic primary by State Senator Theo Mitchell.

== Post legislative career ==
In 2001 Passailaigue was appointed to serve as the executive director of the newly state approved South Carolina Education Lottery.
