= Fletcher Nathaniel Smith Jr. =

American politician (born 1952)

Member of the South Carolina House of Representatives from the 23rd district
- In office 1996–2007
- Preceded by: Ralph Anderson
- Succeeded by: Chandra Dillard

Personal details
- Born: January 26, 1952 Brooklyn, New York
- Party: Democratic
- Spouse: WIlhelmina Elizabeth Bowling
- Children: 2
- Education: Wofford College; University of South Carolina

Fletcher Nathaniel Smith Jr., (born January 26, 1952) is an American politician and attorney, who served as a member of the South Carolina House of Representatives.

== Political career ==
A member of the Democratic Party, Smith represented the 23rd district in the South Carolina House from 1996 to 2007. In 2020, Smith ran for the 7th state senate district, losing in the primary to incumbent Karl B. Allen.

Smith endorsed the Tim Ryan 2020 presidential campaign in the 2020 United States presidential election.

== Personal life ==
Smith's son, Fletcher Nathaniel "Nate" Smith III, is a practicing attorney who worked as General Counsel for Tesla, Inc. and now serves as General Counsel for Norfolk Southern Railway.
