= Sara Beatty Shelton =

American politician

Member of the South Carolina House of Representatives from the 23rd district
- In office 1985–1988
- Preceded by: Theo Mitchell
- Succeeded by: Ennis M. Fant

Personal details
- Born: July 29, 1919
- Died: March 12, 1994 (aged 74)
- Party: Democratic
- Education: Benedict College Furman University
- Profession: Educator

Sara V. Beatty Shelton, (born 1919 - died 1994) was an American politician.

Shelton was the first Upstate Black woman elected to the South Carolina House of Representatives.

Shelton served as a Democratic member for the 23rd district in the South Carolina House of Representatives from 1985 to 1988. She served on the Education Improvement Act Select Committee.
