= 1990 Marshallese referendum =

A series of referendums on the definition of the Marshall Islands and its constitution was held in the Marshall Islands on 11 December 1990. Voters were asked to approve provisions designating the Marshall Islands as a republic and an archipelago. Other proposals concerned amendments guaranteeing the validity of the constitution throughout the whole archipelago and the process by which amendments enter into force. None of the measures were adopted.
