= 1990 Anchorage mayoral election =

- October 2, 1990 (first round); October 30, 1990 (runoff)
- Turnout: 50.86% (runoff)
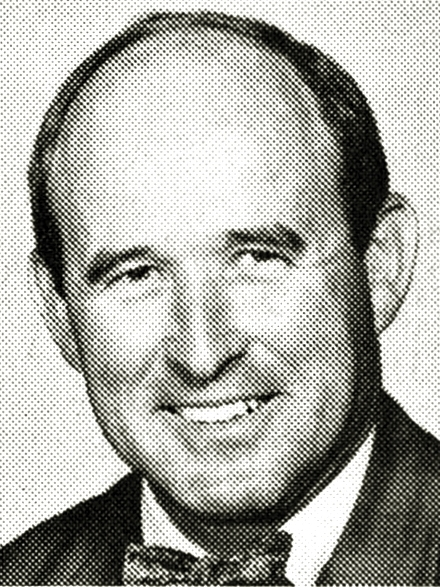

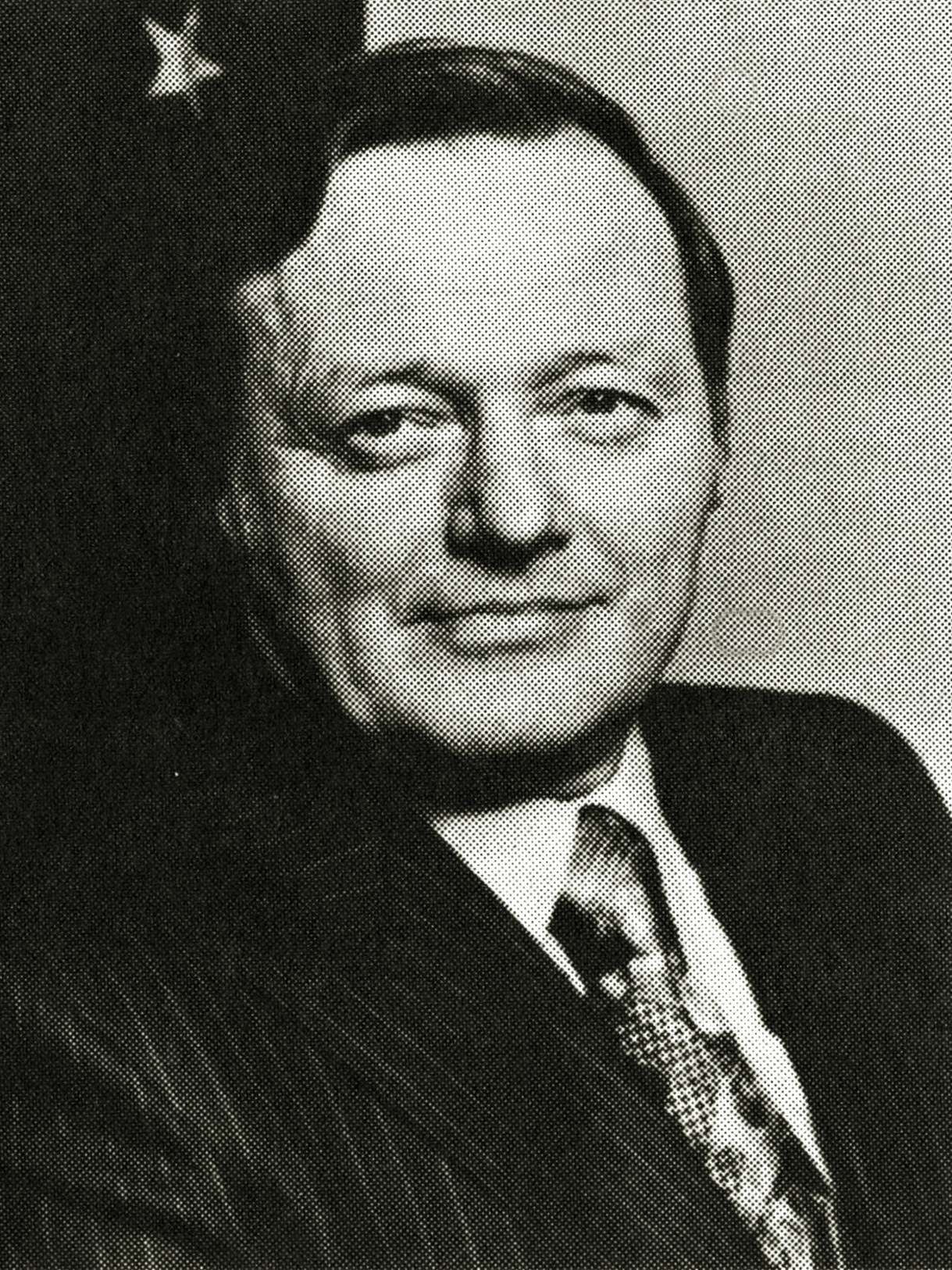
Candidate	Tom Fink	Rick Mystrom	H. A. "Red" Boucher
First-round vote	21,711	21,682	11,881
First-round percentage	38.6%	38.4%	21.5%
Second-round vote	30,338	29,245
Second-round percentage	50.92%	49.08%
Mayor before election
Tom Fink
Republican
Elected mayor
Tom Fink
Republican

The 1990 Anchorage mayoral election was held on October 2 and October 30, 1990, to elect the mayor of Anchorage, Alaska. It saw reelection of Tom Fink.

Since at no candidate received 40% of the vote in the first round (which at least one candidate was required to obtain to avoid a runoff), a runoff was held between the top-two finishers of the first round.

== Candidates ==
- H. A. "Red" Boucher, former Lieutenant Governor of Alaska, former member of the Alaska House of Representatives, and former mayor of Fairbanks, Alaska
- Tom Fink, incumbent mayor
- Rick Mystrom, advertising executive

== Results ==
=== First round ===
1990 Anchorage mayoral general election
Party	Candidate	Votes	%
Nonpartisan	Tom Fink (incumbent)	21,711	38.6
Nonpartisan	Rick Mystrom	21,682	38.4
Nonpartisan	H. A. "Red" Boucher	11,881	21.5
Total votes		55,274	100

=== Runoff ===
1990 Anchorage mayoral runoff election
Party	Candidate	Votes	%
Nonpartisan	Tom Fink (incumbent)	30,338	50.92
Nonpartisan	Rick Mystrom	29,245	49.08
Total votes		59,583	100
