= 1990 United States Senate election in Arkansas =

- November 6, 1990
Nominee	David Pryor
Party	Democratic
Popular vote	493,910
Percentage	99.83%
- County results Pryor: 100% No data/No votes
U.S. senator before election
David Pryor
Democratic
Elected U.S. Senator
David Pryor
Democratic

The 1990 United States Senate election in Arkansas was held on November 6, 1990. Incumbent Democratic U.S. Senator David Pryor won re-election uncontested.

== Candidates ==
=== Democratic ===
- David Pryor, incumbent U.S. senator

== Results ==
1990 United States Senate election in Arkansas
Party	Candidate	Votes	%
Democratic	David Pryor (incumbent)	493,910	99.83%
Independent	Betty White (write-in)	825	0.17%
Majority		493,085	99.83%
Turnout		494,735	
Democratic hold			

== See also ==
- 1990 United States Senate elections
