= 1990 United States Senate election in South Carolina =

- November 6, 1990
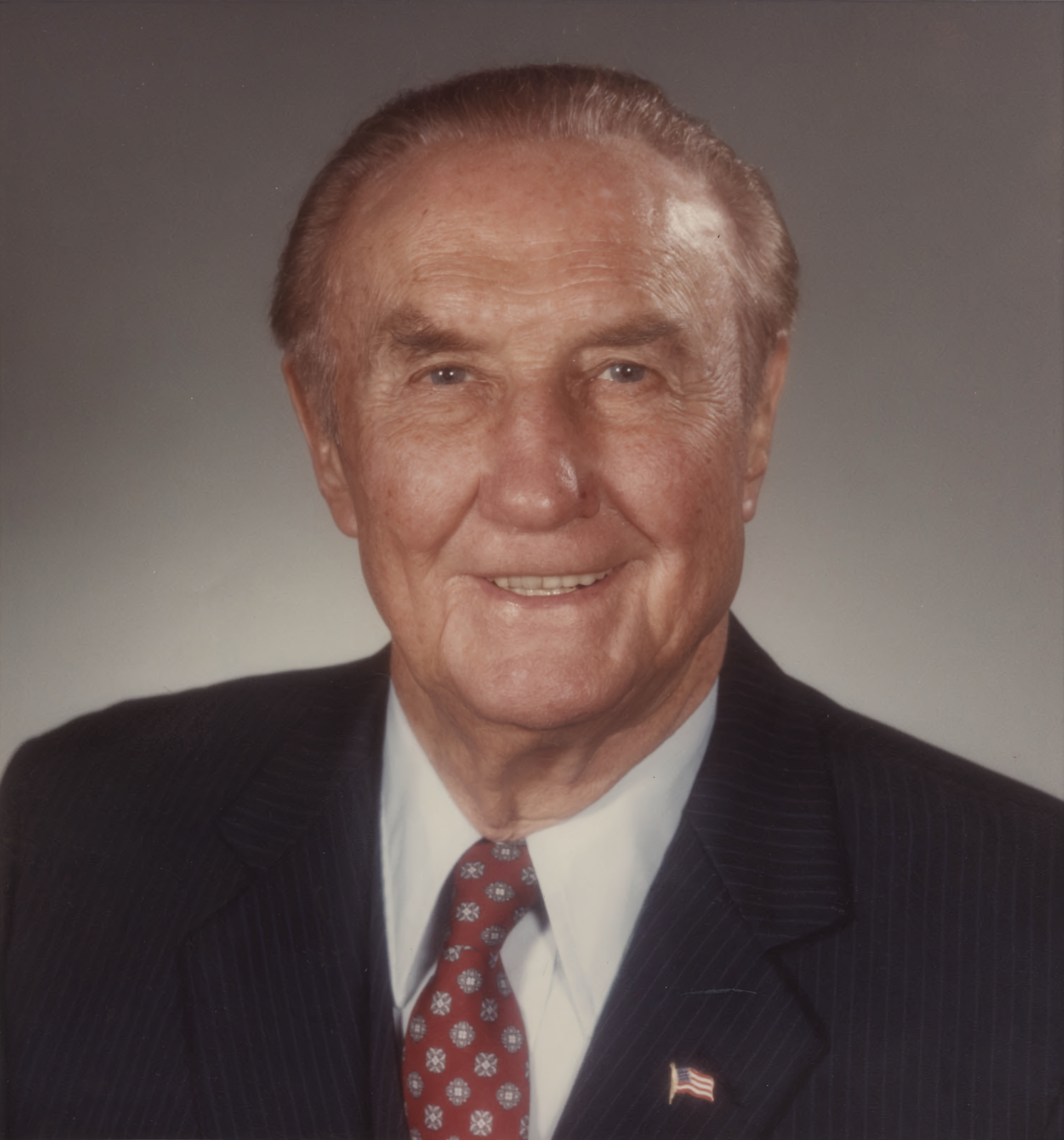

Nominee	Strom Thurmond	Bob Cunningham
Party	Republican	Democratic
Popular vote	482,032	244,112
Percentage	64.21%	32.52%
- County results Thurmond: 40–50% 50–60% 60–70% 70–80% Cunningham: 40–50% 50–60%
U.S. senator before election
Strom Thurmond
Republican
Elected U.S. Senator
Strom Thurmond
Republican

The 1990 South Carolina United States Senate election was held on November 6, 1990, to select the U.S. Senator from the state of South Carolina. Popular incumbent Republican U.S. Senator Strom Thurmond cruised to re-election against Democratic challenger Bob Cunningham.

== Primaries ==
U.S. Senator Strom Thurmond faced no opposition from South Carolina Republicans and avoided a primary election. The state Democrats saw this as an unwinnable race so when Bob Cunningham sought the Democratic nomination, he was unopposed in his bid.

== General ==
Cunningham launched his second bid to unseat Republican Sen. Strom Thurmond after switching from the GOP to the Democratic Party in early 1990. Though he faced a formidable opponent, Cunningham planned no fund-raising activities. "I don't plan to ask for anything and I won't accept any money from PACs," he said. Cunningham said his campaign strategy was to "go to places where I was invited and spread out my ideas." If elected, Cummingham said he would push to limit consecutive congressional service to 12 years and reform the tax system. He supported greater environmental activism. "I think we're going at it in much too lukewarm a fashion. I think we should work hard to find a substitute for the internal combustion engine."

Cunningham, a retired intelligence officer, had little chance of defeating Strom Thurmond and the election was never a serious contest. Thurmond overwhelmingly outspent Cunningham in his re-election campaign.

80% of white voters and 20% of black voters supported Thurmond.

== Election results ==
1990 United States Senate election in South Carolina
Party	Candidate	Votes	%	±%
Republican	Strom Thurmond (incumbent)	482,032	64.21%	−2.58%
Democratic	Bob Cunningham	244,112	32.52%	+0.72%
Libertarian	William H. Griffin	13,804	1.84%	+0.46%
American	Marion C. Metts	10,317	1.37%	N/A
Write-in		464	0.06%	N/A
Total votes		750,729	100.00%	

== See also ==
- List of United States senators from South Carolina
- 1990 United States Senate elections
- 1990 South Carolina gubernatorial election

== Works cited ==
- Black, Earl; Black, Merle (2002). The Rise of Southern Republicans. Harvard University Press. ISBN 067400728X.
