= Ryan Shealy (politician) =

American politician

Ryan C. Shealy (December 9, 1923 – March 5, 2001) was an American politician from South Carolina.

Born in Leesville, South Carolina, Shealy served in the United States Navy during World War II. Shealy served in the South Carolina House of Representatives from 1954 to 1970 and the South Carolina Senate from 1980 to 1992. His daughter, Sherry Shealy Martschink, was a member of the South Carolina Senate at the same time, making them the only father-daughter duo in the US serving in the same legislative body at the same time.
