= Theo Mitchell =

American lawyer and politician

Member of the South Carolina Senate from the 7th district
- In office 1985-1995
- Succeeded by: Samuel Boan

Member of the South Carolina House of Representatives from the 23rd district
- In office 1975-1985
- Succeeded by: Sara Beatty Shelton

Personal details
- Born: July 2, 1938 (age 88) Greenville, South Carolina, U.S.
- Party: Democratic
- Education: Fisk University (BS); Howard University (JD)

Theo Walker Mitchell (born July 2, 1938) is a former attorney from South Carolina who served in the South Carolina General Assembly from 1975 to 1995. He was the first Black South Carolinian to be nominated by a major political party to the office of Governor.

== Early life and education ==
Theo Walker Mitchell was born to Clyde D. Mitchell and Dothenia E. Mitchell on July 2, 1938, in Greenville, South Carolina. He grew up in a broken household and his father moved to Newark, New Jersey, to escape the segregationist practices of the South. Upon completion of high school, Mitchell majored in biology at Fisk University in Nashville, Tennessee, and he aspired to be a doctor. After obtaining his undergraduate degree, Mitchell worked on cancer research in Washington, D.C., but while there he enrolled in law school at Howard University. Mitchell returned to South Carolina in 1969 to attend his grandmother's funeral and found a changed atmosphere that provided economic opportunities for blacks.

== Political career ==
Choosing to remain in South Carolina, Mitchell practiced law for the Legal Services Agency of Greenville, Inc. He ran for a seat in the South Carolina House of Representatives in 1972, but lost the race. However, two years later in 1974, Mitchell won the seat for District 23. In 1982, Mitchell was indicted on a charge of illegal possession of food stamps when a client of his allegedly gave him food stamps as payment for legal services. A mistrial was declared and the charges were dropped after the jury could not reach a verdict in the case. Mitchell won election to the South Carolina Senate for District 7 in 1984 and served as a chairman of the Senate Corrections and Penology Committee during his tenure.

=== 1990 Campaign for Governor ===
Mitchell sought to emulate the recent successes of black politicians such as Jesse Jackson and Douglas Wilder by announcing his candidacy in January for the South Carolina gubernatorial election of 1990. He faced a Democratic primary challenge from State Senator Ernie Passailaigue, but Mitchell won easily thanks in large part due to the support of black voters. Mitchell went on to lose the general election to Governor Carroll A. Campbell, Jr. because of his inability to attract support from the white state Democratic Party establishment.

In 1994 Mitchell was found guilty of seven counts of violating federal tax laws and sentenced to 90 days in jail. Because he was convicted, the South Carolina Senate voted in 1995 to expel Mitchell from the Senate by a vote of 38 to 7. It was the only time that a black member had been expelled from the state Senate. Additionally in response to his expulsion, the state Senate proposed a bill that if a member of the legislature resigns or is expelled, they must repay any compensation received. Upon the completion of his 90-day sentence, he lost the special election to fill his vacant seat.

== Subsequent career ==
Mitchell established the law firm Theo W. Mitchell and Associates in Greenville to specialize in civil rights, human rights and criminal law. As an attorney, he undertook numerous projects for the poor and needy, the consumers, and senior citizens of the county. Mitchell also serves on the board of directors of the LaRouche Movement's Schiller Institute.

== Personal life ==
Mitchell married Greta Knight of Pueblo, Colorado, and they had three daughters. They are both Life Members of the NAACP and active members of Allen Temple A.M.E. Church in Greenville. Member of Omega Psi Phi fraternity.

== Honors and recognitions ==
On April 23, 2025, a portion of a Greenville street was named after Mitchell in a public ceremony. Dignitaries present included Greenville Mayor Knox H. White, Urban League of the Upstate CEO and President Gail Wilson, Greenville County Councilmember Alan Mitchell, and Maybelle Butler Randolph, a sister of the late historian Ruth Ann Butler.

Party political offices
Preceded by Michael R. Daniel	Democratic nominee for Governor of South Carolina; 1990	Succeeded by Nick Theodore
