= T. Ed Garrison Jr. =

American politician

The Honorable Thomas Edmond Garrison Jr.

South Carolina Senate
- In office 1967–1988

South Carolina House of Representatives
- In office 1959–1966

Personal details
- Born: Thomas Edmond Garrison Jr. January 21, 1922 Anderson County, South Carolina, United States
- Died: June 16, 2013 (aged 91) Anderson County, South Carolina
- Resting place: Welcome Baptist Church
- Education: Clemson University
- Occupation: Farmer

Military service
- Allegiance: US
- Branch/service: United States Army Air Forces
- Unit: 69th Medium Bombardment Squadron of the 13th Air Force
- Battles/wars: World War II

Thomas Edmond Garrison Jr. (January 21, 1922 – June 16, 2013) was an American farmer and politician who served in the South Carolina House of Representatives 1959–1966 and then the South Carolina Senate 1967–1988.

== Early life ==
Garrison was born January 21, 1922, in Anderson County, South Carolina; son of Thomas Edmond Garrison and Nettie McPhail Garrison. He graduated from Boys High in Anderson, going on to graduate from Clemson University in 1942 with a degree in Vocational Agriculture. After college Garrison served in the United States Army Air Forces during World War II.

== Political career ==
Garrison was elected to the South Carolina House of Representatives in 1958 and served 1959–1966. He went on to serve in the South Carolina Senate 1967–1988. He died in Anderson County, South Carolina, on June 16, 2013.
