= 1990 South Carolina gubernatorial election =

- November 6, 1990
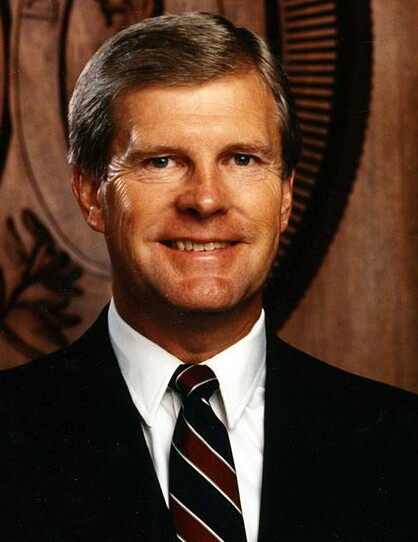

| Nominee | Carroll Campbell | Theo Mitchell |
| Party | Republican | Democratic |
| Popular vote | 528,831 | 212,048 |
| Percentage | 69.49% | 27.86% |
- County results Campbell: 40–50% 50–60% 60–70% 70–80% 80–90% Mitchell: 50–60%
Governor before election
Carroll A. Campbell Jr.
Republican
Elected Governor
Carroll A. Campbell Jr.
Republican

The 1990 South Carolina gubernatorial election was held on November 6, 1990 to elect the governor of South Carolina. Republican incumbent Carroll A. Campbell Jr. won in a landslide over Democratic state senator Theo Mitchell. The campaign received national media attention in September for Mitchell's unapologetic use of the racial epithets "house niggers" and "black prostitutes" to describe Campbell's African American supporters.

This was the first time since 1870 that a Republican was re-elected as governor and the first time since 1874 that the Republican Party had won any two consecutive elections. At the time, Campbell was only the second governor in South Carolina history elected to a second consecutive four-year term.

== Republican primary ==
=== Candidates ===
- Carroll A. Campbell Jr., incumbent governor since 1987

=== Results ===
Campbell faced no opposition from South Carolina Republicans and avoided a primary election.

== Democratic primary ==
=== Candidates ===
- Theo Mitchell, state senator from Greenville
- Ernie Passailaigue, state senator from Charleston

=== Campaign ===
Democratic primary results by county: Theo Mitchell: 80–85% 75–80% 70–75% 65–70% 60–65% 55–60% 50–55%; Ernie Passailaigue: 60–65% 55–60% 50–55%

Ever since the passage of the Voting Rights Act and other civil rights legislation in the 1960s, black participation in the Democratic Party grew while the role of the whites diminished. This became evident in the 1988 U.S. Presidential election when Jesse Jackson, a black civil rights activist from Greenville, was chosen by South Carolina Democrats as their nominee for president. His nomination hastened the exodus of whites from the Democratic Party, but it also gave hope to blacks across the state that they could win a statewide office. Theo Mitchell, a black state senator from Greenville, sought to capitalize on the changing demographics of the state Democratic primary by indicating his intentions of seeking the governorship in April 1989.

In January 1990, Mitchell formally announced his candidacy for governor at a bus station named for him in Greenville. State Senator Ernie Passailaigue of Charleston entered the lackluster race in March 1990, but was widely unknown outside of Charleston and he failed to generate any excitement from the voters or the media. Other prominent state Democrats saw the race as unwinnable because of Governor Campbell's popularity and chose not to run for governor.

=== Results ===
As a result of the apathy of the voters and the declining participation of whites, turnout was light for the state Democratic primary on June 12. Mitchell easily defeated Passailaigue because black voters dominated the primary and they overwhelmingly cast their vote for Mitchell. He made political history by becoming the first black person in South Carolina to be nominated by a major political party for the office of governor.

Democratic Primary
| Candidate | Votes | % |
|---|---|---|
| Theo Mitchell | 116,471 | 57.2 |
| Ernie Passailaigue | 87,639 | 42.8 |

== General election ==
=== Candidates ===
- Carroll A. Campbell Jr., incumbent governor since 1987 (Republican)
- Theo Mitchell, state senator from Greenville (Democratic)
- John R. Peeples Jr. (American)

=== Campaign ===
After his win in the Democratic primary, Theo Mitchell came out swinging against Governor Campbell. He accused Campbell of lying to him in 1988 because he said that Campbell had told him that he would first appoint a black to the State Board of Corrections. Campbell replied that it was a mix-up and instead named a white to the board, although he did later appoint a black to the board. Mitchell also accused Campbell of taking on a "dictatorial role" as governor because of his inaccessibility and said that Campbell was vulnerable on the issues of hazardous waste, auto insurance, and education. The proposals made by Mitchell for the election were:

- Eliminate the sales tax on groceries and over-the-counter medicine.
- Raise the automobile sales tax and restructure income tax brackets.
- Create a state lottery for education.

Governor Campbell stressed throughout the campaign his achievements in office, such as his leadership during Hurricane Hugo and his role in luring BMW to build a manufacturing plant in Greer. The one issue that he hoped to accomplish in a second term was the restructuring of state government for the first time since 1895. He had stated that there were four branches of government in South Carolina: the executive, legislative, judicial and bureaucracy. Campbell desired to reform state government so that it would operate for the people and not the special interests.

Mitchell committed a grave gaffe in September when he referred to Campbell's black supporters as "house niggers" and "black prostitutes who have sold out their race, their dignity, their honor and their integrity." He refused to apologize for the remarks and Campbell cancelled a planned televised debate with Mitchell. The quote and the loss of exposure from a televised debate ultimately doomed Mitchell's quixotic candidacy for governor.

=== Results ===
The general election was held on November 6, 1990, and Carroll A. Campbell, Jr. was reelected overwhelmingly as governor of South Carolina. The defeat marked the second largest loss by a Democratic nominee for governor in the state of South Carolina and the largest loss since Reconstruction. Turnout was less than the previous gubernatorial election because of the uncompetitive nature of the race.

Political commentators said that the huge loss was a result of Mitchell's combative style and his inability to curry support from the white power brokers of the Democratic Party. Consequently, Mitchell lacked the funding to mount an effective campaign against Governor Campbell. Mitchell had to travel by van for long hours to campaign functions and carry his own lectern whereas Campbell and his entourage traversed the state in two planes.

1990 South Carolina gubernatorial election
| Party | Candidate | Votes | % | ±% |
|---|---|---|---|---|
| Republican | Carroll A. Campbell, Jr. (incumbent) | 528,831 | 69.49 | +18.5 |
| Democratic | Theo Mitchell | 212,048 | 27.86 | −20.1 |
| American | John R. Peeples, Jr. | 17,263 | 2.3 | +1.9 |
| No party | Write-Ins | 2,877 | 0.4 | +0.3 |
| Majority | | 316,783 | 41.7 | +38.6 |
| Turnout | | 761,019 | 56.0 | −1.8 |
| Republican hold | | | | |

== See also ==
- Governor of South Carolina
- List of governors of South Carolina
- South Carolina gubernatorial elections

== Notes ==
| Preceded by 1986 | South Carolina gubernatorial elections | Succeeded by 1994 |
