= Arthur Ravenel Jr. =

American politician (1927–2023)

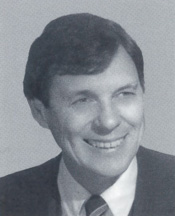

Member of the U.S. House of Representatives from South Carolina's 1st district
- In office January 3, 1987 – January 3, 1995
- Preceded by: Thomas F. Hartnett
- Succeeded by: Mark Sanford

Member of the South Carolina Senate
- In office January 3, 1997 – January 3, 2005
- Preceded by: Greg Smith
- Succeeded by: Raymond Cleary
- Constituency: 34th district
- In office January 13, 1981 – January 3, 1987
- Preceded by: Allen R. Carter
- Succeeded by: Sherry Shealy Martschink
- Constituency: 16th district (1981‍–‍1985); 44th district (1985‍–‍1987)

Member of the South Carolina House of Representatives from Charleston County
- In office January 13, 1953 – January 13, 1959
- Preceded by: Multi-member district
- Succeeded by: Multi-member district

Personal details
- Born: March 29, 1927 Charleston, South Carolina, U.S.
- Died: January 16, 2023 (aged 95) Charleston, South Carolina, U.S.
- Resting place: Huguenot Church Cemetery; Charleston, South Carolina, U.S.
- Party: Democratic (until 1960); Republican (after 1960)
- Relatives: Thomas Ravenel; Charles D. Ravenel
- Education: College of Charleston

Arthur Ravenel Jr. (March 29, 1927 – January 16, 2023) was an American businessman and a Republican politician from Charleston, South Carolina. From 1987 to 1995, he served four terms in the U.S. House of Representatives.

== Early life ==
Ravenel was born on March 29, 1927, to Arthur Ravenel Sr. and Mary Allen Boykin.

During the waning days of World War II, the Charleston-born Ravenel enlisted in the United States Marine Corps, serving from 1945 to 1946. He received a Bachelor of Science degree from the College of Charleston in 1950, then became realtor and general contractor.

== Political career ==
First elected at age 25, he was a Democratic member of the South Carolina House of Representatives from 1953 to 1959.

Ravenel became a Republican in 1960 and ran many times for office. He lost elections for the South Carolina State Senate three times (1962, 1974, and 1976), for the United States House of Representatives (in a 1971 special election), and for mayor of Charleston (also 1971).

=== Congress ===
Ravenel was elected as a Republican to the South Carolina Senate in 1980. He served until 1986, when he was elected to the U.S. Congress from the Charleston-based 1st District that became open when incumbent Tommy Hartnett ran for Lt. Governor.

During his four terms in Congress, he focused his attention on constituent services, rarely sponsoring legislation.

He was reelected three more times without serious opposition. He did not run for reelection in 1994, but instead ran for governor. He finished second in the Republican primary to then State Representative David Beasley, but lost the runoff. Beasley, considered more conservative than Ravenel, went on to win the general election.

=== After Congress ===
In 1996, Ravenel was elected to his old seat in the state Senate, where he served until 2005.

Ravenel staged a comeback in 2006, having been elected at the age of 79 to a seat on the school board of Charleston County. Only a year earlier, he had suffered a bout of Guillain–Barré syndrome. In the same election, his son Thomas Ravenel, also a Republican, was elected state treasurer. The younger Ravenel resigned from the office after only six months following serious legal allegations.

== Controversies ==
Ravenel said that he had run for the state Senate in 1996 specifically to seek funding for a new bridge between Charleston and Mount Pleasant to replace the John P. Grace Memorial Bridge and Silas N. Pearman Bridge. Both bridges were nearing the end of their useful lives and had been criticized as safety hazards. Due to his efforts in passing laws for the new bridge's funding, fellow lawmakers voted to name the cable-stayed bridge in Charleston the Arthur Ravenel Jr. Bridge. Some felt the bridge should not be named after Ravenel, with the head of the South Carolina Infrastructure Bank saying in 1999, "Certainly, Arthur Ravenel is a fine, decent person, but that bridge is bigger than any one individual and it should reflect all the qualities of the state and not some state senator who happens to be in the Legislature the time the structure is being built." Ravenel himself made light of the controversy, joking after diagnosis of his illness that he might die, to the satisfaction of "those people who say you shouldn't name things after people before they're dead."

Ravenel was a member of Moultrie Camp, Sons of Confederate Veterans, and a supporter of the Confederate flag being flown at the South Carolina statehouse. He provoked controversy in response to a reporter's question in 2000 when called the NAACP the "National Association for Retarded People". Asked for an apology, Ravenel, who had a son with Down syndrome, offered one to those who suffered from mental disabilities.

Ravenel once said that his fellow white congressional committee members operated on "black time", which he characterized as meaning "fashionably late".

In August 2020, several episodes of the reality television series Southern Charm, including one that featured Ravenel, were removed from streaming and VOD services over "racially charged moments within them". In the episode featuring Ravenel, he leaves a $5 tip at a restaurant and tells his son, Thomas, that he "[likes] to get rid" of $5 bills because Abraham Lincoln is on the front; he then looks at the camera and smiles "wryly".

== Death ==
Ravenel died in Charleston on January 16, 2023, at the age of 95. He was buried at the cemetery of Huguenot Church in Charleston.

== See also ==
- List of American politicians who switched parties in office

South Carolina House of Representatives
Preceded by Multi-member district	Member of the South Carolina House of Representatives from the Charleston County district January 13, 1953 – January 13, 1959	Succeeded by Multi-member district
South Carolina Senate
Preceded by Allen Ruffin Carter; Arnold Samuel Goodstein; Thomas Forbes Hartnett	Member of the South Carolina Senate from the 16th district January 13, 1981 – January 8, 1985	Succeeded by Caldwell Thomas Hinson
Preceded by District established	Member of the South Carolina Senate from the 44th district January 8, 1985 – January 3, 1987	Succeeded by Sherry Shealy Martschink
Preceded by Greg Smith	Member of the South Carolina Senate from the 34th district January 3, 1997 – January 3, 2005	Succeeded by Raymond Cleary
U.S. House of Representatives
Preceded by Thomas F. Hartnett	Member of the U.S. House of Representatives from South Carolina's 1st congressional district January 3, 1987 – January 3, 1995	Succeeded by Mark Sanford
