= Sherry Shealy Martschink =

American politician

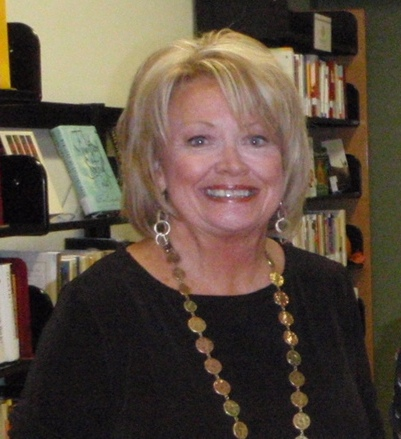
Sherry Shealy Martschink in Charlotte, NC, for a book-signing

Sherry Shealy Martschink (born 1949) is an American politician from South Carolina.

Martschink served in the South Carolina House of Representatives 1971–1975. She was a junior at the University of South Carolina when elected in November 1970 to represent Lexington County, becoming the nation's youngest lawmaker. In 1986, after serving five years on a local school board, she was elected to the South Carolina Senate from Charleston County in a special election and in 1988 was elected to a full term. Her father, Ryan Shealy, was a member of the South Carolina Senate at the same time, making them the only father-daughter duo in the US serving in the same legislative body at the same time. Martschink was also the only person to have been elected to the state legislature from two different parts of the state. Martschink ran for lieutenant governor in 1990 in a campaign managed by her brother, noted political consultant Rod Shealy.

Martschink was appointed to the South Carolina Workers' Compensation Commission in 1992 by Governor Carroll Campbell, was reappointed by Governor David Beasley and served as commissioner until 2004, including one term as vice chair of the commission.

Martschink was a delegate to the 1972 and 1976 National Republican conventions, serving on the Rules Committee both years.

Martschink produced one book featuring art from local residents, ″Don't Pick Up The Ham With Your Fingers: A Little Book to Do Momma's Naggin' For Her" and was a contributing writer to "See Mom Run."

Married to Karl J. Duppstadt since 2010, she has three adult children: Tiffany Martschink, Tree Martschink and Mandy Martschink Brantley. She and her husband founded and operated Antiques & Artisans Village in Summerville, South Carolina, until January 2025. They own The Dupp Group.
